= Frank H. Cann =

American football coach and college athletics instructor

Biographical details
- Born: November 14, 1863; Danvers, Massachusetts, U.S.
- Died: November 19, 1935 (aged 72); New Rochelle, New York, U.S.

Coaching career (HC unless noted)
- 1898: NYU

Head coaching record
- Overall: 1–3

Frank Howard Cann (November 14, 1863 – November 19, 1935) was an American college football coach and athletics instructor. He was the second head football coach at New York University (NYU), serving for one season, in 1898, and leading the NYU Violets to a record of 1–3. In 1907, Cann was still at New York University as director of the Department of Physical Training and Athletics.

Cann died in New Rochelle, New York in 1935. He had two sons who became accomplished sportsmen. Howard Cann was an Olympic shot-putter and a long-time coach of the NYU men's basketball team. Tedford H. Cann was a swimmer and a decorated World War I veteran.

== Head coaching record ==
| Year | Team | Overall | Conference | Standing | Bowl/playoffs |
|---|---|---|---|---|---|
NYU Violets (Independent) (1898)
| 1898 | NYU | 1–3 | | | |
| NYU: | | 1–3 | | | |
| Total: | | 1–3 | | | |
