= List of Drexel Dragons head football coaches =

This is a list of Drexel Dragons football coaches.

== Key ==
Years	Duration of head coaching career at Drexel
Won	Number of games won at Drexel
Lost	Number of games lost at Drexel
Tied	Number of games tied at Drexel
%	Percentage of games won at Drexel
*	Elected to the Pro Football Hall of Fame as a coach

== Head coaches ==
Head coach	Years	Won	Lost	Tied	%
No coach	1892–1897				
D. Leroy Reeves	1898	7	0	0	1.000
No coach	1899–1918				
William L. Ridpath	1919	0	4	0	.000
William McAvoy	1920–1921	2	9	1	.208
Harry J. O'Brien	1922–1925	6	26	1	.197
Ollie W. Reed	1926	2	5	0	.286
Walter Halas	1927–1941	71	44	10	.608
Albert H. Repscha	1942	2	6	0	.250
Maury McMains	1944–1945, 1948	4	10	0	.286
Ralph Chase	1946–1948	3	17	0	.150
Otis Douglas	1949	3	3	1	.500
Eddie Allen	1950–1957	33	24	1	.578
Jack Hinkle	1958–1960	2	20	1	.109
Tom Grebis	1961–1968	39	24	2	.615
Sterling Brown	1969–1973	16	25	0	.400
