= 1898 Holy Cross football team =

American college football season

1898 Holy Cross football
- Conference: Independent
- Record: 5–4–1
- Head coach: Maurice Connor (1st season; games 2–10); John Corbett (interim; first game)
- Captain: M. J. McDonough
- Home stadium: Worcester College Grounds, Worcester Oval

1898 Eastern college football independents records
	Conf.			Overall
Team	W	L	T	W		L		T
Harvard		–		11	–	0	–	0
Drexel		–		7	–	0	–	0
Princeton		–		11	–	0	–	1
Penn		–		12	–	1	–	0
Buffalo		–		8	–	1	–	0
Cornell		–		10	–	2	–	0
Swarthmore		–		9	–	2	–	0
Washington & Jefferson		–		9	–	2	–	0
Yale		–		9	–	2	–	0
Dickinson		–		8	–	2	–	0
Syracuse		–		8	–	2	–	1
Wesleyan		–		7	–	3	–	0
Western Penn.		–		5	–	2	–	1
Brown		–		6	–	4	–	0
Carlisle		–		6	–	4	–	0
Penn State		–		6	–	4	–	0
Pittsburgh College		–		6	–	4	–	1
Army		–		3	–	2	–	1
Vermont		–		3	–	2	–	1
Holy Cross		–		5	–	4	–	1
Bucknell		–		4	–	4	–	3
Fordham		–		1	–	1	–	2
Frankin & Marshall		–		4	–	4	–	2
New Hampshire		–		4	–	4	–	0
Amherst		–		4	–	5	–	1
Villanova		–		2	–	4	–	1
Lehigh		–		3	–	6	–	1
Boston College		–		2	–	5	–	1
Colgate		–		2	–	5	–	1
Temple		–		2	–	5	–	0
Lafayette		–		3	–	8	–	0
NYU		–		1	–	3	–	0
Rutgers		–		1	–	6	–	1
Tufts		–		1	–	9	–	0
Geneva		–		0	–	6	–	1

The 1898 Holy Cross football team was an American football team that represented the College of the Holy Cross as an independent in the 1898 college football season.

In its first year under head coach Maurice Connor, the team compiled a 5–4–1 record. M. J. McDonough was the team captain. John Corbett served as interim head coach for the season's first game, a win.

Holy Cross played its home games at two off-campus fields in Worcester, Massachusetts, the Worcester Oval and the Worcester College Grounds.

== Schedule ==
Date	Opponent	Site	Result	Source
September 24	at Massachusetts	Alumni Field; Amherst, MA	W 23–0	
October 1	at Brown	Lincoln Field; Providence, RI	L 0–19	
October 9	Gardner A.C.	Worcester College Grounds; Worcester, MA	W 6–1	
October 12	at Wesleyan	Andrus Field; Middletown, CT	L 0–12	
October 26	Phillips Andover Academy	Andover, MA	L 0–6	
October 29	Worcester Tech	Worcester Oval; Worcester, MA	W 45–6	
November 1	Tufts	Worcester College Grounds; Worcester, MA	W 12–0	
November 5	Boston College	Worcester College Grounds; Worcester, MA (rivalry)	T 0–0	
November 12	Vermont	Worcester College Grounds; Worcester, MA	W 17–5	
November 24	at Boston College	South End Grounds; Boston, MA (rivalry)	L 0–11	
