= Frank E. Wade =

American lawyer

Biographical details
- Born: October 6, 1873; Malta Bend, Missouri, U.S.
- Died: March 3, 1930 (aged 56); Syracuse, New York, U.S.

Coaching career (HC unless noted)
- 1895: Depauw
- 1897–1899: Syracuse

Head coaching record
- Overall: 20–12–3

Frank Edward Wade (October 6, 1873 – March 3, 1930) was an American lawyer, college football player and coach, and piano manufacturer. He served as the head football coach at DePauw University in 1895 and at Syracuse University from 1897 to 1899, compiling a career head coaching record of 20–12–3. Wade was born in Malta Bend, Missouri, a son of William Henry Wade. He attended Washington University in St. Louis before graduating from Yale University in 1896 and Syracuse University College of Law in 1898. He practiced law in Syracuse, New York, and was president of the Amphion Piano Company, which he sold a few years before his death in 1930.

== Head coaching record ==
Year	Team	Overall	Conference	Standing	Bowl/playoffs
DePauw (Indiana Intercollegiate Athletic Association) (1895)
1895	DePauw	3–3–1			
DePauw:		3–3–1			
Syracuse Orangemen (Independent) (1897–1899)
1897	Syracuse	5–3–1			
1898	Syracuse	8–2–1			
1899	Syracuse	4–4			
Syracuse:		17–9–2			
Total:		20–12–3			
