= 1898 Cornell Big Red football team =

American college football season

1898 Cornell Big Red football
- Conference: Independent
- Record: 10–2
- Head coach: Pop Warner (2nd season)
- Captain: Allen Whiting
- Home stadium: Percy Field

1898 Eastern college football independents records
	Conf.			Overall
Team	W	L	T	W		L		T
Harvard		–		11	–	0	–	0
Drexel		–		7	–	0	–	0
Princeton		–		11	–	0	–	1
Penn		–		12	–	1	–	0
Buffalo		–		8	–	1	–	0
Cornell		–		10	–	2	–	0
Swarthmore		–		9	–	2	–	0
Washington & Jefferson		–		9	–	2	–	0
Yale		–		9	–	2	–	0
Dickinson		–		8	–	2	–	0
Syracuse		–		8	–	2	–	1
Wesleyan		–		7	–	3	–	0
Western Penn.		–		5	–	2	–	1
Brown		–		6	–	4	–	0
Carlisle		–		6	–	4	–	0
Penn State		–		6	–	4	–	0
Pittsburgh College		–		6	–	4	–	1
Army		–		3	–	2	–	1
Vermont		–		3	–	2	–	1
Holy Cross		–		5	–	4	–	1
Bucknell		–		4	–	4	–	3
Fordham		–		1	–	1	–	2
Franklin & Marshall		–		4	–	4	–	2
New Hampshire		–		4	–	4	–	0
Amherst		–		4	–	5	–	1
Villanova		–		2	–	4	–	1
Lehigh		–		3	–	6	–	1
Boston College		–		2	–	5	–	1
Colgate		–		2	–	5	–	1
Temple		–		2	–	5	–	0
Lafayette		–		3	–	8	–	0
NYU		–		1	–	3	–	0
Rutgers		–		1	–	6	–	1
Tufts		–		1	–	9	–	0
Geneva		–		0	–	6	–	1

The 1898 Cornell Big Red football team was an American football team that represented Cornell University during the 1898 college football season. In their second season under head coach Pop Warner, the Big Red compiled a 10–2 record and outscored all opponents by a combined total of 296 to 29. Three Cornell players received honors on the 1898 College Football All-America Team: tackle Edwin Sweetland (Walter Camp-3); guard Daniel A. Reed, Cornell (Camp-3, Leslie's Weekly-2); and halfback Allen E. Whiting, Cornell (Outing-2, Leslie's-2).

== Schedule ==
Date	Time	Opponent	Site	Result	Attendance	Source
September 21		Syracuse	Percy Field; Ithaca, NY	W 28–0		
September 24		Colgate	Percy Field; Ithaca, NY (rivalry)	W 29–5		
September 28		Hamilton	Percy Field; Ithaca, NY	W 41–0		
October 1		Trinity (CT)	Percy Field; Ithaca, NY	W 47–0		
October 5		at Syracuse	Syracuse, NY	W 30–0		
October 12		Carlisle	Percy Field; Ithaca, NY	W 23–6		
October 15		Buffalo	Percy Field; Ithaca, NY	W 27–0		
October 22		at Princeton	Princeton, NJ	L 0–6		
October 29		Oberlin	Percy Field; Ithaca, NY	W 6–0		
November 5	3:00 p.m.	vs. Williams	Buffalo Athletic Field; Buffalo, NY	W 12–0	4,000–5,000	
November 12		Lafayette	Percy Field; Ithaca, NY	W 47–0		
November 24		at Penn	Franklin Field; Philadelphia, PA (rivalry)	L 6–12		
