= 1898 Williams Ephs football team =

American college football season

1898 Williams Ephs football
- Conference: Triangular Football League
- Record: 3–8 (0–2 TFL)
- Head coach: None
- Captain: Alonzo Edwin Branch
- Home stadium: Weston Field

1898 Triangular Football League standings
	Conf.					Overall
Team	W		L		T	W		L		T
Dartmouth $	2	–	0	–	0	5	–	6	–	0
Amherst	1	–	1	–	0	4	–	5	–	1
Williams	0	–	2	–	0	3	–	8	–	0
$ – Conference champion

The 1898 Williams Ephs football team represented the Williams College as a member of the Triangular Football League (TFL) during the 1898 college football season. Williams compiled an overall record of 3–8 with a mark of 0–2 in conference play, placing last out of three teams in the TFL. Alonzo Edwin Branch served as team captain. Williams played home games at Weston Field in Williamstown, Massachusetts.

== Schedule ==
Date	Time	Opponent	Site	Result	Attendance	Source
September 30		at Phillips Academy*	Andover, MA	W 6–0		
October 1	3:00 p.m.	at Harvard*	Soldiers' Field; Cambridge, MA	L 0–11	1,000	
October 8		at Yale*	Yale Field; New Haven, CT	L 0–23		
October 12		Union (NY)*	Weston Field; Williamstown, MA	L 0–6		
October 15		vs. Carlisle*	Ridgefield Athletic Park; Albany, NY	L 6–17	3,000	
October 19		Colgate*	Weston Field; Williamstown, MA	W 5–0		
October 22		Wesleyan*	Weston Field; Williamstown, MA	L 0–22		
October 29		Trinity (CT)*	Weston Field; Williamstown, MA	W 24–0		
November 5	3:00 p.m.	vs. Cornell*	Buffalo Athletic Field; Buffalo, NY	L 0–12	4,000–5,000	
November 12		Dartmouth	Weston Field; Williamstown, MA	L 6–10	1,000	
November 19		Amherst	Weston Field; Williamstown, MA (rivalry)	L 5–16		
*Non-conference game
