= 1898 Buffalo football team =

American college football season

1898 Buffalo football
- Conference: Independent
- Record: 8–1
- Head coach: Louis Hinkey (1st season)
- Captain: Ernest C. White
- Home stadium: Olympic Park

1898 Eastern college football independents records
	Conf.			Overall
Team	W	L	T	W		L		T
Harvard		–		11	–	0	–	0
Drexel		–		7	–	0	–	0
Princeton		–		11	–	0	–	1
Penn		–		12	–	1	–	0
Buffalo		–		8	–	1	–	0
Cornell		–		10	–	2	–	0
Swarthmore		–		9	–	2	–	0
Washington & Jefferson		–		9	–	2	–	0
Yale		–		9	–	2	–	0
Dickinson		–		8	–	2	–	0
Syracuse		–		8	–	2	–	1
Wesleyan		–		7	–	3	–	0
Western Penn.		–		5	–	2	–	1
Brown		–		6	–	4	–	0
Carlisle		–		6	–	4	–	0
Penn State		–		6	–	4	–	0
Pittsburgh College		–		6	–	4	–	1
Army		–		3	–	2	–	1
Vermont		–		3	–	2	–	1
Holy Cross		–		5	–	4	–	1
Bucknell		–		4	–	4	–	3
Fordham		–		1	–	1	–	2
Franklin & Marshall		–		4	–	4	–	2
New Hampshire		–		4	–	4	–	0
Amherst		–		4	–	5	–	1
Villanova		–		2	–	4	–	1
Lehigh		–		3	–	6	–	1
Boston College		–		2	–	5	–	1
Colgate		–		2	–	5	–	1
Temple		–		2	–	5	–	0
Lafayette		–		3	–	8	–	0
NYU		–		1	–	3	–	0
Rutgers		–		1	–	6	–	1
Tufts		–		1	–	9	–	0
Geneva		–		0	–	6	–	1

The 1898 Buffalo football team represented the University of Buffalo as an independent during the 1898 college football season. The team compiled an 8–1 record and outscored opponents by a total of 214 to 37. Buffalo's coach was Louis Hinkey and played its home games at Olympic Park in Buffalo, New York.

== Schedule ==
Date	Time	Opponent	Site	Result	Source
October 1		at Twin City	North Tonawanda, NY	W 29–0	
October 8		Rensselaer Polytechnic	Olympic Park; Buffalo, NY	W 12–5	
October 15		at Cornell	Percy Field; Ithaca, NY	L 0–27	
October 22		at Company C, National Guard	Bradford, PA	W 23–0	
October 29		Case	Olympic Park; Buffalo, NY	W 29–0	
November 8		Colgate	Olympic Park; Buffalo, NY	W 23–0	
November 12		Company C, National Guard	Olympic Park; Buffalo, NY	W 28–0	
November 19		Cornell B team	Olympic Park; Buffalo, NY	W 34–0	
November 24	3:30 p.m.	Bucknell	Olympic Park; Buffalo, NY	W 36–5	
