= John Dunlop (American football) =

American football player and coach (1874–1957)

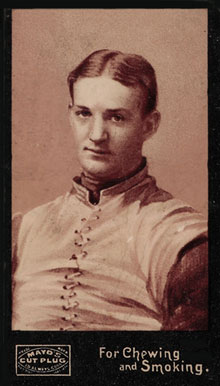

Biographical details
- Born: April 28, 1874; Cambridge, Massachusetts, U.S.
- Died: April 7, 1957 (aged 82); Westborough, Massachusetts, U.S.
- Education: Harvard College (1897)

Playing career
- 1893–1896: Harvard
- Position: Halfback

Coaching career (HC unless noted)
- 1897–1901: Boston College

Head coaching record
- Overall: 16–16–2

John William Dunlop (April 28, 1874 – April 7, 1957) was an American college football player and coach. He was the fifth head football coach at Boston College, serving for four seasons between 1897 and 1901 and compiling a record of 16–16–2. Boston College did not field a football team in 1900.

In 1922, Dunlop was residing in Boston, working as a real estate, mortgage and insurance broker. He was married to Alice Lillian Hall, whom he wed on October 25, 1899, and had two children, Lydia and John William Jr.. He later entered in a partnership with Stephen W. Sleeper, a fellow Harvard alumnus, to form the real estate firm Sleeper & Dunlop.

Dunlop died at Westborough, Massachusetts, in 1957.

== Head coaching record ==
Year	Team	Overall	Conference	Standing	Bowl/playoffs
Boston College (Independent) (1897–1901)
1897	Boston College	4–3			
1898	Boston College	2–5–1			
1899	Boston College	8–1–1			
1900	No team				
1901	Boston College	2–7			
Boston College:		16–16–2			
Total:		16–16–2			

== See also ==
- List of college football head coaches with non-consecutive tenure
