= William D. Inglis =

American football player, coach, and physician (1874–1969)

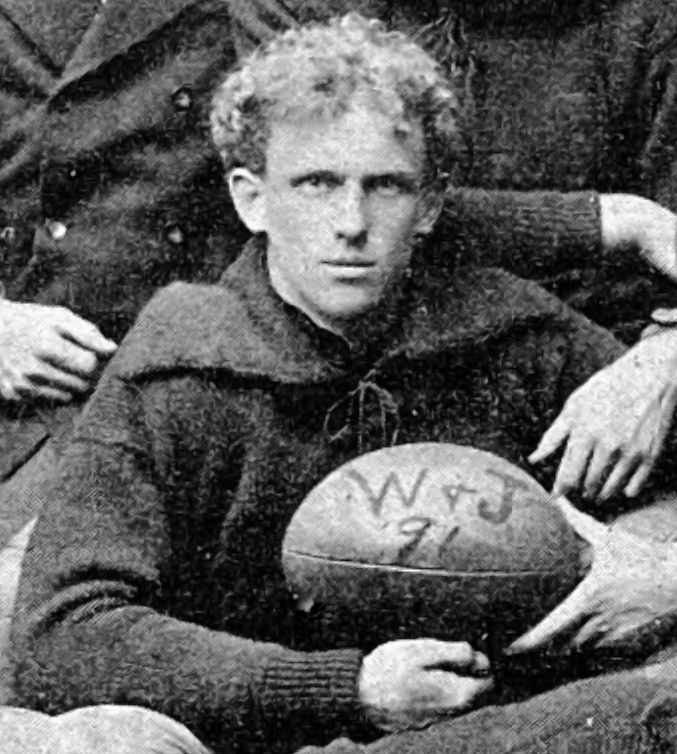
- Inglis as captain of the 1896 W&J football team

Biographical details
- Born: October 21, 1874; Claysville, Pennsylvania, U.S.
- Died: October 6, 1969 (aged 94); Columbus, Ohio, U.S.
- Education: Washington & Jefferson (1897); Ohio State (MD, 1902)

Playing career
- 1894–1897: Washington & Jefferson
- 1897: Greensburg Athletic Association
- Positions: Center, guard

Coaching career (HC unless noted)
- 1898: Washington & Jefferson

Head coaching record
- Overall: 9–2

William Darling Inglis Sr. (October 21, 1874 – October 6, 1969) was an American football player and coach and physician. He served as the head football coach at his alma mater, Washington & Jefferson College, in Canonsburg, Pennsylvania in 1898, compiling a record of 9–2. Inglis was a 1902 graduate of the Ohio State University College of Medicine.

== Head coaching record ==
Year	Team	Overall	Conference	Standing	Bowl/playoffs
Washington & Jefferson (Independent) (1898)
1898	Washington & Jefferson	9–2			
Washington & Jefferson:		9–2			
Total:		9–2			
