= 1898 Colgate football team =

American college football season

1898 Colgate football
- Conference: Independent
- Record: 2–5–1
- Head coach: Charles B. Mason (2nd season)
- Captain: Walter Cramp

1898 Eastern college football independents records
	Conf.			Overall
Team	W	L	T	W		L		T
Harvard		–		11	–	0	–	0
Drexel		–		7	–	0	–	0
Princeton		–		11	–	0	–	1
Penn		–		12	–	1	–	0
Buffalo		–		8	–	1	–	0
Cornell		–		10	–	2	–	0
Swarthmore		–		9	–	2	–	0
Washington & Jefferson		–		9	–	2	–	0
Yale		–		9	–	2	–	0
Dickinson		–		8	–	2	–	0
Syracuse		–		8	–	2	–	1
Wesleyan		–		7	–	3	–	0
Western Penn.		–		5	–	2	–	1
Brown		–		6	–	4	–	0
Carlisle		–		6	–	4	–	0
Penn State		–		6	–	4	–	0
Pittsburgh College		–		6	–	4	–	1
Army		–		3	–	2	–	1
Vermont		–		3	–	2	–	1
Holy Cross		–		5	–	4	–	1
Bucknell		–		4	–	4	–	3
Fordham		–		1	–	1	–	2
Franklin & Marshall		–		4	–	4	–	2
New Hampshire		–		4	–	4	–	0
Amherst		–		4	–	5	–	1
Villanova		–		2	–	4	–	1
Lehigh		–		3	–	6	–	1
Boston College		–		2	–	5	–	1
Colgate		–		2	–	5	–	1
Temple		–		2	–	5	–	0
Lafayette		–		3	–	8	–	0
NYU		–		1	–	3	–	0
Rutgers		–		1	–	6	–	1
Tufts		–		1	–	9	–	0
Geneva		–		0	–	6	–	1

The 1898 Colgate football team represented Colgate University in the 1898 college football season. Colgate reports the record for the season as 2–5, however, a reporting error in early record keeping failed to account for a 6–6 tie with Hamilton on October 1.

== Schedule ==
Date	Opponent	Site	Result	Attendance	Source
September 24	at Cornell	Ithaca, NY (rivalry)	L 5–29		
October 1	at Hamilton	Clinton, NY	T 6–6		
October 19	at Williams	Weston Field; Williamstown, MA	L 0–5		
October 29	St. John's Academy	Hamilton, NY	W 6–0		
November 7	at Hobart	Geneva, NY	W 12–5		
November 8	at Buffalo	Olympic Park; Buffalo, NY	L 0–23		
November 12	Union (NY)	Hamilton, NY	L 0–11		
November 24	vs. Hamilton	Utica, NY	L 0–5	800	
