= Maurice Connor =

Maurice Connor may refer to:

- Joe Connor (footballer, born 1877) (Maurice Joseph John Connor, 1877–1934), Irish association football player
- Maurice Connor (American football) (died 1939), American football coach

== Other people ==
- Maurice Conner (1868–1937), sometimes spelled as Connor, Canadian politician
