= 1898 Penn State football team =

American college football season

1898 Penn State football
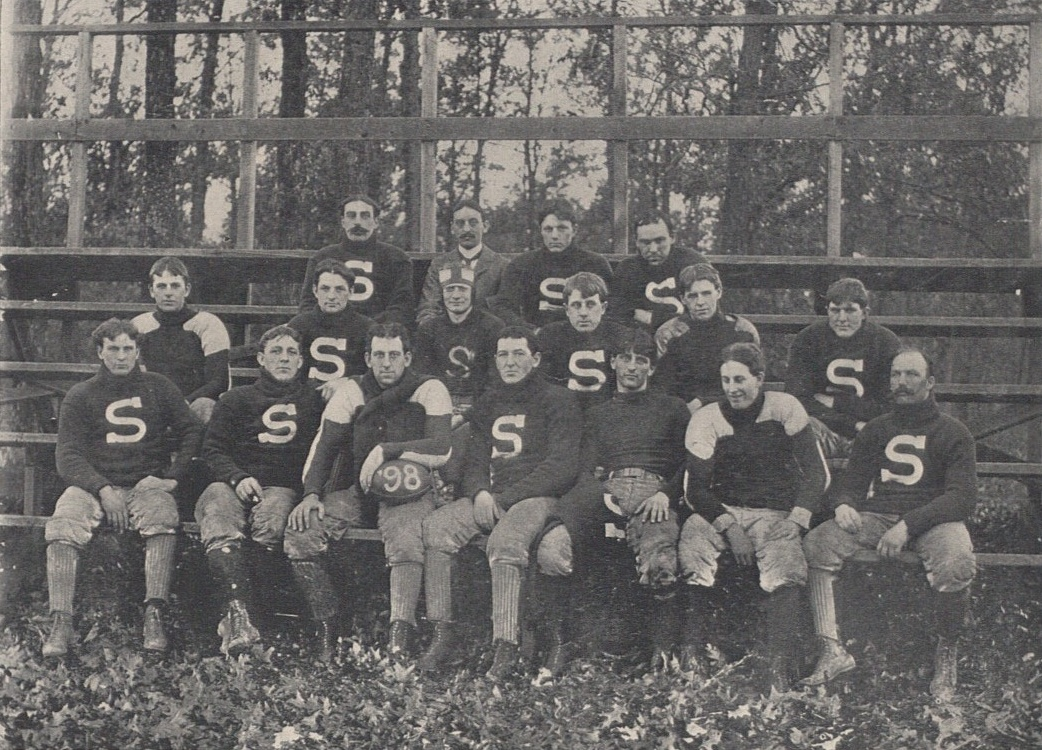
- Conference: Independent
- Record: 6–4
- Head coach: Samuel B. Newton (3rd season)
- Captain: Lalon Hayes
- Home stadium: Beaver Field

1898 Eastern college football independents records
	Conf.			Overall
Team	W	L	T	W		L		T
Harvard		–		11	–	0	–	0
Drexel		–		7	–	0	–	0
Princeton		–		11	–	0	–	1
Penn		–		12	–	1	–	0
Buffalo		–		8	–	1	–	0
Cornell		–		10	–	2	–	0
Swarthmore		–		9	–	2	–	0
Washington & Jefferson		–		9	–	2	–	0
Yale		–		9	–	2	–	0
Dickinson		–		8	–	2	–	0
Syracuse		–		8	–	2	–	1
Wesleyan		–		7	–	3	–	0
Western Penn.		–		5	–	2	–	1
Brown		–		6	–	4	–	0
Carlisle		–		6	–	4	–	0
Penn State		–		6	–	4	–	0
Pittsburgh College		–		6	–	4	–	1
Army		–		3	–	2	–	1
Vermont		–		3	–	2	–	1
Holy Cross		–		5	–	4	–	1
Bucknell		–		4	–	4	–	3
Fordham		–		1	–	1	–	2
Franklin & Marshall		–		4	–	4	–	2
New Hampshire		–		4	–	4	–	0
Villanova		–		2	–	4	–	1
Lehigh		–		3	–	6	–	1
Boston College		–		2	–	5	–	1
Colgate		–		2	–	5	–	1
Temple		–		2	–	5	–	0
Lafayette		–		3	–	8	–	0
NYU		–		1	–	3	–	0
Rutgers		–		1	–	6	–	1
Tufts		–		1	–	9	–	0
Geneva		–		0	–	6	–	1

The 1898 Penn State football team was an American football team that represented Pennsylvania State College—now known as Pennsylvania State University—as an independent during the 1898 college football season. The team was coached by Samuel B. Newton and played its home games on Beaver Field in University Park, Pennsylvania.

== Schedule ==
Date	Opponent	Site	Result	Attendance	Source
September 24	Gettysburg	Beaver Field; State College, PA	W 47–0		
October 1	at Penn	Franklin Field; Philadelphia, PA	L 0–40		
October 8	at Lafayette	March Field; Easton, PA	W 5–0		
October 15	Susquehanna	Beaver Field; State College, PA	W 45–6		
October 22	at Navy	Worden Field; Annapolis, MD	L 11–16		
October 26	at Princeton	University Field; Princeton, NJ	L 0–5		
October 29	at Duquesne Country and Athletic Club	Pittsburgh, PA	L 5–18		
November 5	vs. Bucknell	Williamsport, PA	W 16–0	5,000	
November 19	at Washington & Jefferson	Washington, PA	W 11–6	1,200	
November 25	vs. Dickinson	Williamsport, PA	W 34–0		
