= 1898 Dickinson Red and White football team =

American college football season

1898 Dickinson Red and White football
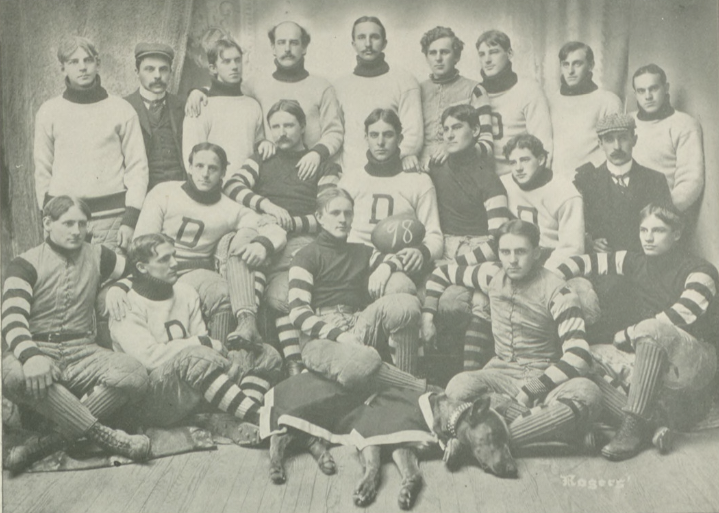
- Conference: Independent
- Record: 8–2
- Head coach: Nathan Stauffer (3rd season)
- Captain: A. M. Devall

1898 Eastern college football independents records
	Conf.			Overall
Team	W	L	T	W		L		T
Harvard		–		11	–	0	–	0
Drexel		–		7	–	0	–	0
Princeton		–		11	–	0	–	1
Penn		–		12	–	1	–	0
Buffalo		–		8	–	1	–	0
Cornell		–		10	–	2	–	0
Swarthmore		–		9	–	2	–	0
Washington & Jefferson		–		9	–	2	–	0
Yale		–		9	–	2	–	0
Dickinson		–		8	–	2	–	0
Syracuse		–		8	–	2	–	1
Wesleyan		–		7	–	3	–	0
Western Penn.		–		5	–	2	–	1
Brown		–		6	–	4	–	0
Carlisle		–		6	–	4	–	0
Penn State		–		6	–	4	–	0
Pittsburgh College		–		6	–	4	–	1
Army		–		3	–	2	–	1
Vermont		–		3	–	2	–	1
Holy Cross		–		5	–	4	–	1
Bucknell		–		4	–	4	–	3
Fordham		–		1	–	1	–	2
Franklin & Marshall		–		4	–	4	–	2
New Hampshire		–		4	–	4	–	0
Amherst		–		4	–	5	–	1
Villanova		–		2	–	4	–	1
Lehigh		–		3	–	6	–	1
Boston College		–		2	–	5	–	1
Colgate		–		2	–	5	–	1
Temple		–		2	–	5	–	0
Lafayette		–		3	–	8	–	0
NYU		–		1	–	3	–	0
Rutgers		–		1	–	6	–	1
Tufts		–		1	–	9	–	0
Geneva		–		0	–	6	–	1

The 1898 Dickinson Red and White football team was an American football team that represented Dickinson College as an independent during the 1898 college football season. The team compiled an 8–1 record and outscored opponents by a total of 211 to 86. Nathan Stauffer was the team's head coach, and A. M. Devall was the captain.

Andrew Kerr, later inducted into the College Football Hall of Fame, was a student at Dickinson at the time but did not play for the varsity football team.

== Schedule ==
Date	Opponent	Site	Result	Attendance	Source
September 24	Susquehanna	Carlisle, PA	W 24–0		
October 1	at Bloomsburg Normal	Bloomsburg, PA	W 6–0		
October 8	Haverford	Carlisle, PA	W 24–0	600	
October 15	at Lafayette	Easton, PA	W 12–6		
October 22	Wyoming Seminary	Carlisle, PA	W 23–0	600	
October 29	at Franklin & Marshall	Lancaster, PA	W 22–0		
November 5	vs. Carlisle	Carlisle, PA	L 0–46	3,000	
November 12	Lebanon Valley	Carlisle, PA	W 56–0		
November 16	Gettysburg	Carlisle, PA	W 44–0		
November 24	vs. Penn State	Williamsport, PA	L 0–34		

== Players ==
The following players were starters on the 1898 team:

- O. N. Diehl - center
- W. H. Decker - right guard
- G. H. Bonner - left guard
- A. M. Devall - captain, right tackle
- Fred Bindenberger - left tackle
- Forrest Craver - right end
- S. F. Shiffer - left end
- George Williams - left end
- D. N. Houston - quarterback
- E. F. Hann - right halfback
- C. H. Clippinger - left halfback
- R. N. Hockenberry - fullback
