= 1898 Harvard Crimson football team =

American college football season

1898 Harvard Crimson football
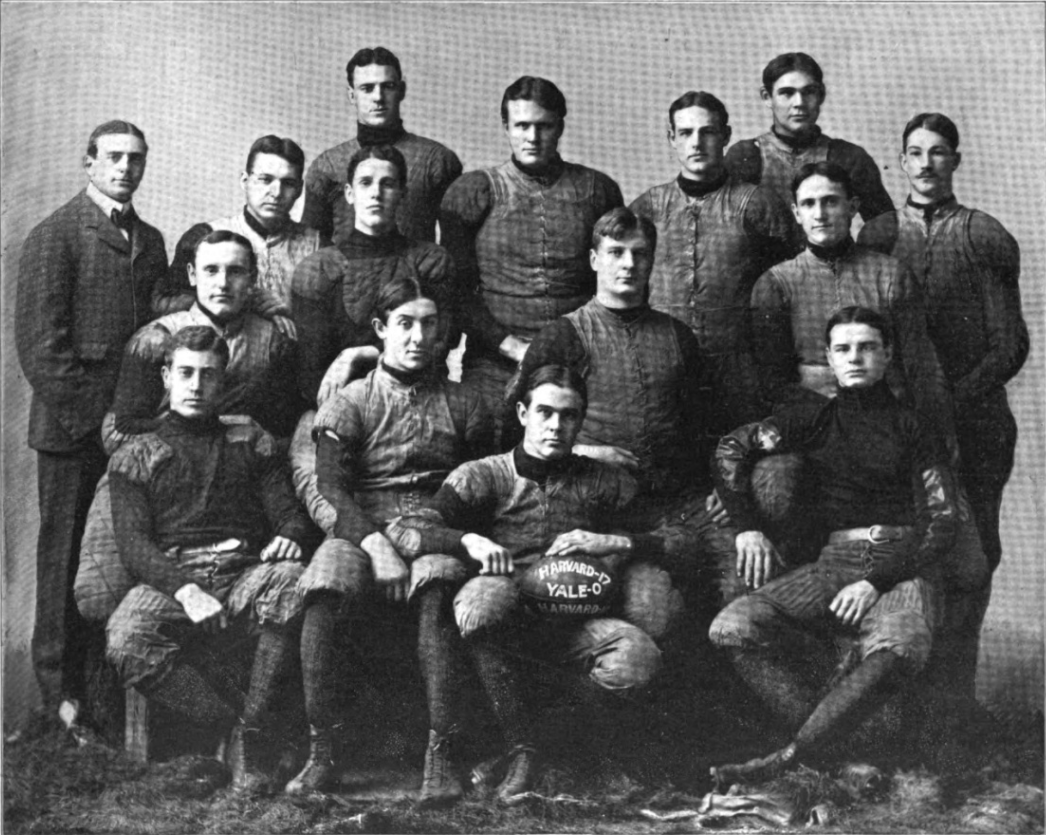

National champion (Billingsley, Helms, Houlgate, NCF)
- Conference: Independent
- Record: 11–0
- Head coach: William Cameron Forbes (2nd season)
- Home stadium: Soldiers' Field

1898 Eastern college football independents records
	Conf.			Overall
Team	W	L	T	W		L		T
Harvard		–		11	–	0	–	0
Drexel		–		7	–	0	–	0
Princeton		–		11	–	0	–	1
Penn		–		12	–	1	–	0
Buffalo		–		8	–	1	–	0
Cornell		–		10	–	2	–	0
Swarthmore		–		9	–	2	–	0
Washington & Jefferson		–		9	–	2	–	0
Yale		–		9	–	2	–	0
Dickinson		–		8	–	2	–	0
Syracuse		–		8	–	2	–	1
Wesleyan		–		7	–	3	–	0
Western Penn.		–		5	–	2	–	1
Brown		–		6	–	4	–	0
Carlisle		–		6	–	4	–	0
Penn State		–		6	–	4	–	0
Pittsburgh College		–		6	–	4	–	1
Army		–		3	–	2	–	1
Vermont		–		3	–	2	–	1
Holy Cross		–		5	–	4	–	1
Bucknell		–		4	–	4	–	3
Fordham		–		1	–	1	–	2
Franklin & Marshall		–		4	–	4	–	2
New Hampshire		–		4	–	4	–	0
Amherst		–		4	–	5	–	1
Villanova		–		2	–	4	–	1
Lehigh		–		3	–	6	–	1
Boston College		–		2	–	5	–	1
Colgate		–		2	–	5	–	1
Temple		–		2	–	5	–	0
Lafayette		–		3	–	8	–	0
NYU		–		1	–	3	–	0
Rutgers		–		1	–	6	–	1
Tufts		–		1	–	9	–	0
Geneva		–		0	–	6	–	1

The 1898 Harvard Crimson football team was an American football team that represented Harvard University as an independent during the 1898 college football season. In their second year under head coach William Cameron Forbes, the Crimson compiled an 11–0 record, shut out seven of eleven opponents, and outscored all opponents by a total of 257 to 19.

There was no contemporaneous system in 1898 for determining a national champion. However, Harvard was retroactively named as the national champion by the Billingsley Report, Helms Athletic Foundation, Houlgate System, and National Championship Foundation. Princeton, which finished the 1898 season 11–0–1, was named champion by one selector, Parke H. Davis.

Three Harvard players were consensus first-team selections on the 1898 All-American football team: quarterback Charles Dudley Daly; halfback Benjamin Dibblee; and end John Hallowell. Other notable players included fullback Bill Reid; tackles Percy Haughton and Malcolm Donald; guard Walter Boal; halfback Leicester Warren; center Percy Malcolm Jaffrey; and end Francis Douglas Cochran. Haughton and Daly were later inducted into the College Football Hall of Fame.

== Schedule ==
Date	Time	Opponent	Site	Result	Attendance	Source
October 1	3:00 p.m.	Williams	Soldiers' Field; Boston, MA	W 11–0	1,000	
October 5	4:00 p.m.	Bowdoin	Soldiers' Field; Boston, MA	W 28–6	200	
October 8	3:00 p.m.	Dartmouth	Soldiers' Field; Boston, MA (rivalry)	W 21–0		
October 12	4:00 p.m.	Amherst	Soldiers' Field; Boston, MA	W 53–2		
October 15		at Army	The Plain; West Point, NY	W 28–0		
October 19		Newtowne Athletic Association	Soldiers' Field; Boston, MA	W 22–0		
October 22		Chicago Athletic Association	Soldiers' Field; Boston, MA	W 39–0	2,000	
October 29		Carlisle	Soldiers' Field; Boston, MA	W 11–5		
November 5		Penn	Soldiers' Field; Boston, MA (rivalry)	W 10–0		
November 12	3:00 p.m.	Brown	Soldiers' Field; Boston, MA	W 17–6		
November 19		at Yale	Yale Field; New Haven, CT (rivalry)	W 17–0	17,500	
