= 1898 New Hampshire football team =

American college football season

1898 New Hampshire football
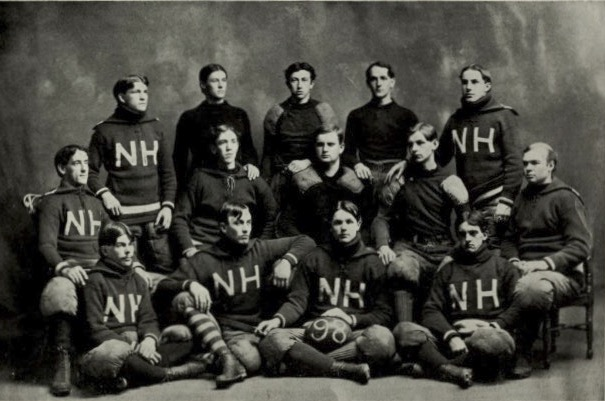
- Team captain Calderwood at right-center of the front row, holding football
- Conference: Independent
- Record: 4–4 (Note: per the University's media guide; 1898 sources differ)
- Head coach: None
- Captain: Henry H. Calderwood
- Home stadium: College grounds, Durham, NH

1898 Eastern college football independents records
| | Conf. | | | Overall |
| Team | W | L | T | W | | L | | T |
|---|---|---|---|---|---|---|---|---|
| Harvard | | – | | 11 | – | 0 | – | 0 |
| Drexel | | – | | 7 | – | 0 | – | 0 |
| Princeton | | – | | 11 | – | 0 | – | 1 |
| Penn | | – | | 12 | – | 1 | – | 0 |
| Buffalo | | – | | 8 | – | 1 | – | 0 |
| Cornell | | – | | 10 | – | 2 | – | 0 |
| Swarthmore | | – | | 9 | – | 2 | – | 0 |
| Washington & Jefferson | | – | | 9 | – | 2 | – | 0 |
| Yale | | – | | 9 | – | 2 | – | 0 |
| Dickinson | | – | | 8 | – | 2 | – | 0 |
| Syracuse | | – | | 8 | – | 2 | – | 1 |
| Wesleyan | | – | | 7 | – | 3 | – | 0 |
| Western Penn. | | – | | 5 | – | 2 | – | 1 |
| Brown | | – | | 6 | – | 4 | – | 0 |
| Carlisle | | – | | 6 | – | 4 | – | 0 |
| Penn State | | – | | 6 | – | 4 | – | 0 |
| Pittsburgh College | | – | | 6 | – | 4 | – | 1 |
| Army | | – | | 3 | – | 2 | – | 1 |
| Vermont | | – | | 3 | – | 2 | – | 1 |
| Holy Cross | | – | | 5 | – | 4 | – | 1 |
| Bucknell | | – | | 4 | – | 4 | – | 3 |
| Fordham | | – | | 1 | – | 1 | – | 2 |
| Franklin & Marshall | | – | | 4 | – | 4 | – | 2 |
| New Hampshire | | – | | 4 | – | 4 | – | 0 |
| Amherst | | – | | 4 | – | 5 | – | 1 |
| Villanova | | – | | 2 | – | 4 | – | 1 |
| Lehigh | | – | | 3 | – | 6 | – | 1 |
| Boston College | | – | | 2 | – | 5 | – | 1 |
| Colgate | | – | | 2 | – | 5 | – | 1 |
| Temple | | – | | 2 | – | 5 | – | 0 |
| Lafayette | | – | | 3 | – | 8 | – | 0 |
| NYU | | – | | 1 | – | 3 | – | 0 |
| Rutgers | | – | | 1 | – | 6 | – | 1 |
| Tufts | | – | | 1 | – | 9 | – | 0 |
| Geneva | | – | | 0 | – | 6 | – | 1 |

The 1898 New Hampshire football team (Note: The school did not adopt the Wildcats nickname until February 1926; before then, they were generally referred to as "the blue and white".) was an American football team that represented New Hampshire College of Agriculture and the Mechanic Arts (Note: The school was often referred to as New Hampshire College or New Hampshire State College in newspapers of the era.) during the 1898 college football season—the school became the University of New Hampshire in 1923. The team finished with a record of 3–5 or 4–4, per 1898 sources or modern sources, respectively.

== Schedule ==
Scoring during this era awarded five points for a touchdown, one point for a conversion kick (extra point), and five points for a field goal. (Note: Scoring during the 1883–1897 seasons had been 4 points for a touchdown and 2 points for a conversion kick.) Teams played in the one-platoon system and the forward pass was not yet legal. Games were played in two halves rather than four quarters.

| Date | Opponent | Site | per 1898 sources | | per modern sources | |
| Date | Opponent | Site | Result | Source | Result | Source |
|---|---|---|---|---|---|---|
| October 6 | at Bates | Lewiston, ME | L 0–35 | | L 0–35 | |
| October 8 | at Bowdoin | Whittier Field · Brunswick, ME | L 0–59 | | L 0–59 | |
| October 15 | Sanborn Seminary | Durham, NH | W 81–0 | | W 81–0 | |
| October 22 | MIT (underclassmen) (Note: Sources differ as to whether the MIT underclassmen team was freshmen or sophomores.) | Durham, NH | W 6–0 | | W 6–0 | |
| November 2 | MIT (varsity) | Durham, NH | L 0–22 | | L 0–22 | |
| November 5 | at Andover Academy | Andover, MA | L 0–24 | | L 0–24 | |
| November 12 | Portsmouth HS Alumni | Durham, NH | L 0–6 | | W 11–0 | |
| November 16 | Saint Anselm | Durham, NH | W 11–0 | | W 11–0 | |

The 81 points scored by New Hampshire on October 15 surpass program records of most points scored (70) and greatest margin of victory (66) as listed in the New Hampshire media guide; however, this game was played against a high school team.

The November 2 game was the first meeting between the New Hampshire and MIT varsity football programs.

The New Hampshire team left the field early in the second half of the November 12 game, due to rough play. The contemporary game recap published in The Portsmouth Herald notes that the referee "awarded it to Portsmouth six to nothing." The score on the field had been 11–0 in favor of New Hampshire at the time the game was abandoned.

== Roster ==
| Name | Position | Team photo location |
|---|---|---|
| Henry H. Calderwood (captain) | fullback | on floor, second from right (with football) |
| Guy M. Cleaveland | right halfback (sub.) | standing rightmost |
| Irving A. Colby | left tackle | seated, second from left |
| J. N. Cook | fullback (sub.) | standing, second from left |
| J. S. Dearborn | center | seated, center |
| Harry G. Farwell | right end | on floor, leftmost |
| George | end (sub.) | standing, second from right |
| Fred H. Grover | left halfback (sub.) | seated, second from right |
| Willis D. F. Hayden | right guard | seated, rightmost |
| J. Norton Hunt | left end | standing, leftmost |
| Rutherford B. Lewis | quarterback | on floor, rightmost |
| W. H. Twombly | right guard | standing, center |
| John E. Wilson | left halfback | seated, leftmost |
| Robert M. Wright | right halfback | on floor, second from left |
