= 1898 Penn Quakers football team =

American college football season

1898 Penn Quakers football
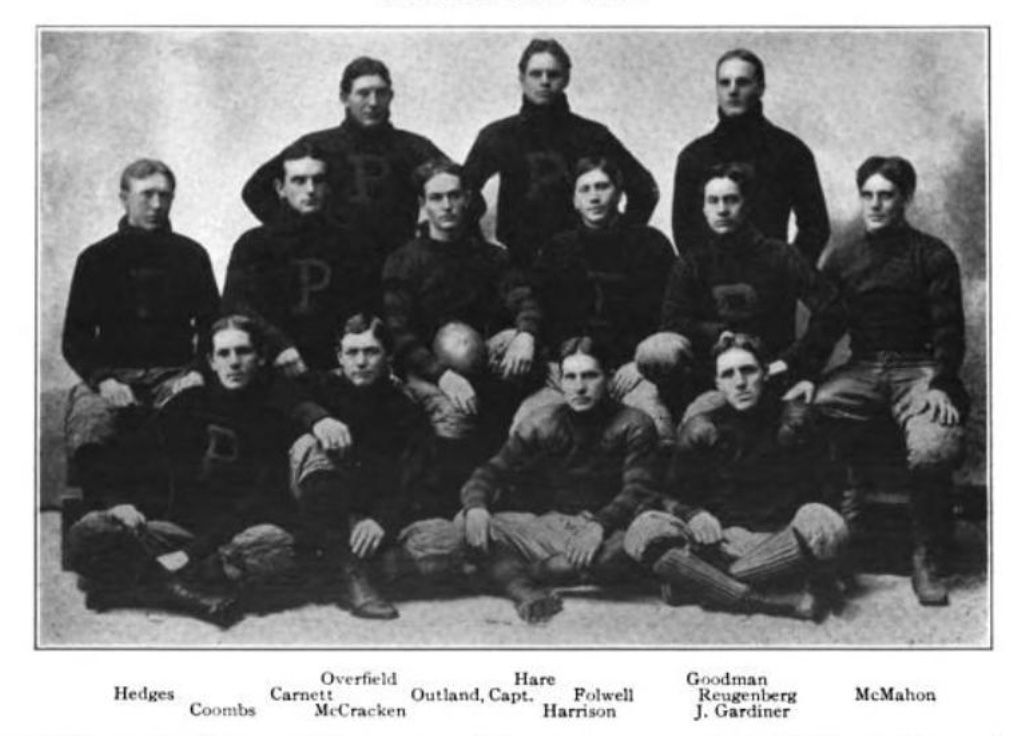
- Conference: Independent
- Record: 12–1
- Head coach: George Washington Woodruff (7th season)
- Captain: John H. Outland
- Home stadium: Franklin Field

1898 Eastern college football independents records
	Conf.			Overall
Team	W	L	T	W		L		T
Harvard		–		11	–	0	–	0
Drexel		–		7	–	0	–	0
Princeton		–		11	–	0	–	1
Penn		–		12	–	1	–	0
Buffalo		–		8	–	1	–	0
Cornell		–		10	–	2	–	0
Swarthmore		–		9	–	2	–	0
Washington & Jefferson		–		9	–	2	–	0
Yale		–		9	–	2	–	0
Dickinson		–		8	–	2	–	0
Syracuse		–		8	–	2	–	1
Wesleyan		–		7	–	3	–	0
Western Penn.		–		5	–	2	–	1
Brown		–		6	–	4	–	0
Carlisle		–		6	–	4	–	0
Penn State		–		6	–	4	–	0
Pittsburgh College		–		6	–	4	–	1
Army		–		3	–	2	–	1
Vermont		–		3	–	2	–	1
Holy Cross		–		5	–	4	–	1
Bucknell		–		4	–	4	–	3
Fordham		–		1	–	1	–	2
Franklin & Marshall		–		4	–	4	–	2
New Hampshire		–		4	–	4	–	0
Amherst		–		4	–	5	–	1
Villanova		–		2	–	4	–	1
Lehigh		–		3	–	6	–	1
Boston College		–		2	–	5	–	1
Colgate		–		2	–	5	–	1
Temple		–		2	–	5	–	0
Lafayette		–		3	–	8	–	0
NYU		–		1	–	3	–	0
Rutgers		–		1	–	6	–	1
Tufts		–		1	–	9	–	0
Geneva		–		0	–	6	–	1

The 1898 Penn Quakers football team represented the University of Pennsylvania as an independent during the 1898 college football season. Led by seventh-year head coach George Washington Woodruff, the Quakers compiled a record of 12–1. Penn played home games at Franklin Field in Philadelphia.

== Schedule ==
Date	Opponent	Site	Result	Attendance	Source
September 24	Franklin & Marshall	Franklin Field; Philadelphia, PA	W 41–0		
September 28	Gettysburg	Franklin Field; Philadelphia, PA	W 50–0		
October 1	Penn State	Franklin Field; Philadelphia, PA	W 40–0		
October 5	Mansfield Normal	Franklin Field; Philadelphia, PA	W 50–0		
October 8	Brown	Franklin Field; Philadelphia, PA	W 18–0	5,000	
October 12	Virginia	Franklin Field; Philadelphia, PA	W 40–0		
October 15	Lehigh	Franklin Field; Philadelphia, PA	W 40–0		
October 19	Wesleyan	Franklin Field; Philadelphia, PA	W 17–0	3,500	
October 22	Lafayette	Franklin Field; Philadelphia, PA	W 32–0		
October 29	Chicago	Franklin Field; Philadelphia, PA	W 23–11		
November 5	at Harvard	Soldiers' Field; Boston, MA (rivalry)	L 0–10		
November 12	Carlisle	Franklin Field; Philadelphia, PA	W 35–5		
November 25	Cornell	Franklin Field; Philadelphia, PA (rivalry)	W 12–6		
