= 1898 Brown Bears football team =

American college football season

1898 Brown Bears football
- Conference: Independent
- Record: 6–4
- Head coach: Edward N. Robinson (1st season)
- Captain: Fred W. Murphy
- Home stadium: Lincoln Field, Adelaide Park

1898 Eastern college football independents records
	Conf.			Overall
Team	W	L	T	W		L		T
Harvard		–		11	–	0	–	0
Drexel		–		7	–	0	–	0
Princeton		–		11	–	0	–	1
Penn		–		12	–	1	–	0
Buffalo		–		8	–	1	–	0
Cornell		–		10	–	2	–	0
Swarthmore		–		9	–	2	–	0
Washington & Jefferson		–		9	–	2	–	0
Yale		–		9	–	2	–	0
Dickinson		–		8	–	2	–	0
Syracuse		–		8	–	2	–	1
Wesleyan		–		7	–	3	–	0
Western Penn.		–		5	–	2	–	1
Brown		–		6	–	4	–	0
Carlisle		–		6	–	4	–	0
Penn State		–		6	–	4	–	0
Pittsburgh College		–		6	–	4	–	1
Army		–		3	–	2	–	1
Vermont		–		3	–	2	–	1
Holy Cross		–		5	–	4	–	1
Bucknell		–		4	–	4	–	3
Fordham		–		1	–	1	–	2
Franklin & Marshall		–		4	–	4	–	2
New Hampshire		–		4	–	4	–	0
Amherst		–		4	–	5	–	1
Villanova		–		2	–	4	–	1
Lehigh		–		3	–	6	–	1
Boston College		–		2	–	5	–	1
Colgate		–		2	–	5	–	1
Temple		–		2	–	5	–	0
Lafayette		–		3	–	8	–	0
NYU		–		1	–	3	–	0
Rutgers		–		1	–	6	–	1
Tufts		–		1	–	9	–	0
Geneva		–		0	–	6	–	1

The 1898 Brown Bears football team was an American football team that represented Brown University as an independent during the 1898 college football season. In their first year under head coach Edward N. Robinson, the team compiled a 6–4 record and outscored opponents by a total of 135 to 96. Fred W. Murphy was the team captain.

== Schedule ==
Date	Time	Opponent	Site	Result	Attendance	Source
October 1		Holy Cross	Lincoln Field; Providence, RI	W 19–0		
October 5		Tufts	Lincoln Field; Providence, RI	W 29–6		
October 8		at Penn	Franklin Field; Philadelphia, PA	L 0–18	5,000	
October 16		Colby	Lincoln Field; Providence, RI	W 41–5		
October 19		at Yale	Yale Field; New Haven, CT	L 6–22		
October 24		Boston College	Lincoln Field; Providence, RI	W 6–0		
October 29		Princeton	Adelaide Park; Providence, RI	L 0–23	1,500–2,500	
November 5		Newtowne Athletic Association	Providence, RI	W 16–5		
November 12	3:00 p.m.	at Harvard	Soldiers' Field; Boston, MA	L 6–17		
November 21		Dartmouth	Adelaide Park; Providence, RI	W 12–0	2,000	
