= 1898 Chicago Athletic Association football team =

American football team season

1898 Chicago Athletic Association football
- League: Independent
- Record: 6–5–1
- Manager: William Hale Thompson
- Head coach: William Hale Thompson
- Captain: Arthur H. Pixley
- Home field: Wanderers' Field

The 1898 Chicago Athletic Association football team was an American football team representing the Chicago Athletic Association. Led by manager and coach William Hale Thompson, the team compiled a record of 6–5–1. It played its home games at Wanderers' Field, located at 39th Street and Wentworth Avenue in Chicago.

== Schedule ==
Date	Opponent	Site	Result	Source
September 24	Chicago Manual Training School	Wanderers' Field; Chicago, IL	W 79–0	
October 4	Chicago Manual Training School		W 44–0	
October 8	St. Charles	Wanderers' Field; Chicago, IL	W 33–0	
October 10	at South Bend Commercial-Athletic Club	Springbrook Park; South Bend, IN	L 11–15	
October 15	Indianapolis Athletic Club	Wanderers' Field; Chicago, IL	W 11–0	
October 18	at Northwestern (Note: Game was closed to the public. Although the Chicago Tribune called it "nothing more than a practice for both elevens", Northwestern University includes the game in its official season records. The Tribune reported the score as 4–0, counting the touchdown as only four points (possible under Amos Alonzo Stagg's "western rules"). Northwestern records and the Chicago Inter Ocean give the score as 5–0.)	Sheppard Field; Evanston, IL	L 0–5 or 0–4	
October 22	at Harvard	Soldiers' Field; Boston, MA	L 0–39	
October 29	at Newtowne Athletic Club	Charles River Park; Cambridge, MA	W 8–0	
November 2	at Knickerbocker Athletic Club	Berkeley Oval; New York, NY	L 10–11	
November 5	at Yale	Yale Field; New Haven, CT	L 0–10	
November 12	All-Stars	Wanderers' Field; Chicago, IL	T 5–5	
November 24	Dartmouth	Wanderers' Field; Chicago, IL	W 18–5	
