= 1898 Yale Bulldogs football team =

American college football season

1898 Yale Bulldogs football
- Conference: Independent
- Record: 9–2
- Head coach: Frank Butterworth (2nd season)
- Captain: Burr Chamberlain
- Home stadium: Yale Field

1898 Eastern college football independents records
	Conf.			Overall
Team	W	L	T	W		L		T
Harvard		–		11	–	0	–	0
Drexel		–		7	–	0	–	0
Princeton		–		11	–	0	–	1
Penn		–		12	–	1	–	0
Buffalo		–		8	–	1	–	0
Cornell		–		10	–	2	–	0
Swarthmore		–		9	–	2	–	0
Washington & Jefferson		–		9	–	2	–	0
Yale		–		9	–	2	–	0
Dickinson		–		8	–	2	–	0
Syracuse		–		8	–	2	–	1
Wesleyan		–		7	–	3	–	0
Western Penn.		–		5	–	2	–	1
Brown		–		6	–	4	–	0
Carlisle		–		6	–	4	–	0
Penn State		–		6	–	4	–	0
Pittsburgh College		–		6	–	4	–	1
Army		–		3	–	2	–	1
Vermont		–		3	–	2	–	1
Holy Cross		–		5	–	4	–	1
Bucknell		–		4	–	4	–	3
Fordham		–		1	–	1	–	2
Franklin & Marshall		–		4	–	4	–	2
New Hampshire		–		4	–	4	–	0
Amherst		–		4	–	5	–	1
Villanova		–		2	–	4	–	1
Lehigh		–		3	–	6	–	1
Boston College		–		2	–	5	–	1
Colgate		–		2	–	5	–	1
Temple		–		2	–	5	–	0
Lafayette		–		3	–	8	–	0
NYU		–		1	–	3	–	0
Rutgers		–		1	–	6	–	1
Tufts		–		1	–	9	–	0
Geneva		–		0	–	6	–	1

The 1898 Yale Bulldogs football team represented Yale University in the 1898 college football season. The Bulldogs finished with a 9–2 record, under second-year head coach Frank Butterworth. The team recorded seven shutouts and won its first nine games by a combined 146 to 11 score. It then lost its final two games against rivals Princeton (6–0) and Harvard (17–0).

Three Yale players, halfback Malcolm McBride and guards Burr Chamberlain and Gordon Brown, were consensus picks for the 1898 College Football All-America Team.

== Schedule ==
Date	Time	Opponent	Site	Result	Attendance	Source
September 24	3:30 p.m.	at Trinity (CT)	Trinity grounds; Hartford, CT	W 18–0		
October 1		Wesleyan	Yale Field; New Haven, CT	W 5–0		
October 5		Amherst	Yale Field; New Haven, CT	W 34–0		
October 8		Williams	Yale Field; New Haven, CT	W 23–0		
October 15		at Newton Athletic Association	Newton, MA	W 6–0		
October 19		Brown	Yale Field; New Haven, CT	W 22–6		
October 22		Carlisle	Yale Field; New Haven, CT	W 18–5	2,500	
October 29		at Army	The Plain; West Point, NY	W 10–0	5,000	
November 5		Chicago Athletic Association	Yale Field; New Haven, CT	W 10–0		
November 12		at Princeton	Brokaw Field; Princeton, NJ (rivalry)	L 0–6	16,500	
November 19		Harvard	Yale Field; New Haven, CT (rivalry)	L 0–17	17,500	

== Roster ==
- Andrews, G
- Hamilton F. Benjamin, HB
- Gordon Brown, G
- Burdick, HB
- Burr Chamberlain, FB
- Clarence P. Cooke, T
- Arthur F. Corwin, HB
- Sherman Coy, E
- George Barton Cutten, C
- Dashiel, FB
- Charles de Saulles, QB
- Charles T. Dudley, E
- Charles Dupee, FB
- Alfred H. Durston, T
- Edwin M. Eddy, E
- Morris Ely, QB
- Grant, T
- Perry W. Harvey, C
- George W. Hubbell, E
- Edward E. Marshall, T
- Alexander B. Marvin, HB
- Malcolm McBride, FB
- Raymond A. McGee, G
- Ralph R. Richardson
- Richard J. Schweppe, E
- Albert Sharpe, E
- George S. Stillman, G
- Stocovich, E
- Corliss E. Sullivan, QB
- Leonard M. Thomas, E
- Raynham Townsend, HB
- Walton, C
- James H. Wear, HB
- Keyes Winter, QB
