= 1898 Swarthmore Quakers football team =

American college football season

1898 Swarthmore Quakers football
- Conference: Independent
- Record: 9–2
- Head coach: Jacob K. Shell (11th season)
- Home stadium: Whittier Field

1898 Eastern college football independents records
	Conf.			Overall
Team	W	L	T	W		L		T
Harvard		–		11	–	0	–	0
Drexel		–		7	–	0	–	0
Princeton		–		11	–	0	–	1
Penn		–		12	–	1	–	0
Buffalo		–		8	–	1	–	0
Cornell		–		10	–	2	–	0
Swarthmore		–		9	–	2	–	0
Washington & Jefferson		–		9	–	2	–	0
Yale		–		9	–	2	–	0
Dickinson		–		8	–	2	–	0
Syracuse		–		8	–	2	–	1
Wesleyan		–		7	–	3	–	0
Western Penn.		–		5	–	2	–	1
Brown		–		6	–	4	–	0
Carlisle		–		6	–	4	–	0
Penn State		–		6	–	4	–	0
Pittsburgh College		–		6	–	4	–	1
Army		–		3	–	2	–	1
Vermont		–		3	–	2	–	1
Holy Cross		–		5	–	4	–	1
Bucknell		–		4	–	4	–	3
Fordham		–		1	–	1	–	2
Franklin & Marshall		–		4	–	4	–	2
New Hampshire		–		4	–	4	–	0
Amherst		–		4	–	5	–	1
Villanova		–		2	–	4	–	1
Lehigh		–		3	–	6	–	1
Boston College		–		2	–	5	–	1
Colgate		–		2	–	5	–	1
Temple		–		2	–	5	–	0
Lafayette		–		3	–	8	–	0
NYU		–		1	–	3	–	0
Rutgers		–		1	–	6	–	1
Tufts		–		1	–	9	–	0
Geneva		–		0	–	6	–	1

The 1898 Swarthmore Quakers football team was an American football team that represented Swarthmore College as an independent during the 1898 college football season. The team compiled a 9–2 record and outscored opponents by a total of 152 to 64. Jacob K. Shell was the head coach.

== Schedule ==
Date	Time	Opponent	Site	Result	Source
September 28		Swarthmore alumni	Swarthmore, PA	W 6–0	
October 1		at Delaware	Front and Union street grounds; Wilmington, DE	W 22–0	
October 8		Rutgers	Whittier Field; Swarthmore, PA	W 6–0	
October 12		at Georgetown	Washington, DC	W 11–0	
October 19		Ursinus	Whittier Field; Swarthmore, PA	W 29–0	
October 22	2:30 p.m.	at Bucknell	Lewisburg, PA	L 18–34	
November 2		Pennsylvania Military	Whittier Field; Swarthmore, PA	W 22–0	
November 5		Franklin & Marshall	Swarthmore, PA	W 10–6	
November 9		Delaware	Swarthmore, PA	W 6–0	
November 12		at Columbian	Washington, DC	W 22–6	
November 19		Haverford	Whittier Field; Swarthmore, PA (rivalry)	L 0–12	
