= 1898 Geneva Covenanters football team =

American college football season

1898 Geneva Covenanters football
- Conference: Independent
- Record: 0–6–1
- Head coach: Floyd Rose (1st season)
- Captain: Harry Hunter

1898 Eastern college football independents records
	Conf.			Overall
Team	W	L	T	W		L		T
Harvard		–		11	–	0	–	0
Drexel		–		7	–	0	–	0
Princeton		–		11	–	0	–	1
Penn		–		12	–	1	–	0
Buffalo		–		8	–	1	–	0
Cornell		–		10	–	2	–	0
Swarthmore		–		9	–	2	–	0
Washington & Jefferson		–		9	–	2	–	0
Yale		–		9	–	2	–	0
Dickinson		–		8	–	2	–	0
Syracuse		–		8	–	2	–	1
Wesleyan		–		7	–	3	–	0
Western Penn.		–		5	–	2	–	1
Brown		–		6	–	4	–	0
Carlisle		–		6	–	4	–	0
Penn State		–		6	–	4	–	0
Pittsburgh College		–		6	–	4	–	1
Army		–		3	–	2	–	1
Vermont		–		3	–	2	–	1
Holy Cross		–		5	–	4	–	1
Bucknell		–		4	–	4	–	3
Fordham		–		1	–	1	–	2
Franklin & Marshall		–		4	–	4	–	2
New Hampshire		–		4	–	4	–	0
Amherst		–		4	–	5	–	1
Villanova		–		2	–	4	–	1
Lehigh		–		3	–	6	–	1
Boston College		–		2	–	5	–	1
Colgate		–		2	–	5	–	1
Temple		–		2	–	5	–	0
Lafayette		–		3	–	8	–	0
NYU		–		1	–	3	–	0
Rutgers		–		1	–	6	–	1
Tufts		–		1	–	9	–	0
Geneva		–		0	–	6	–	1

The 1898 Geneva Covenanters football team was an American football team that represented Geneva College as an independent during the 1898 college football season. The team finished with a record of 0–6–1. Its captain was Harry Hunter.

== Coach ==
According to the Geneva record book, the team's 1897 player-coach Ross Fiscus continued his coaching role for an additional two seasons; however, newspapers reported that former Duquesne Country and Athletic Club quarterback Floyd Rose was coaching Geneva as of September 1898.

Fiscus, who began the season as captain and coach of the New Castle Terrors and by October joined the Grove City College team, played for both of those teams against Geneva.

== Schedule ==
Date	Time	Opponent	Site	Result	Source
September 20		New Castle Terrors	New Castle, PA	L 0–17	
October 1	3:00 p.m.	Pittsburgh College	Pittsburgh College grounds; Pittsburgh, PA	L 5–23	
October 8		at Grove City	Grove City, PA	L 0–39	
October 15		Westminster (PA)	Geneva Park; Beaver Falls, PA	L 0–17	
October 29		Swissvale Athletic Club	Beaver Falls, PA	L 0–5	
November 5		Duquesne Country and Athletic Club	Exposition Park; Allegheny City, PA	L 0–68	
November 12		at Westminster (PA)	New Wilmington, PA	T 0–0	
November 19		Grove City	Beaver Falls, PA	Cancelled	
All times are in Eastern time
