= 1898 Lafayette football team =

American college football season

1898 Lafayette football
- Conference: Independent
- Record: 3–8
- Head coach: Samuel B. Newton (1st season)
- Captain: Charles Best
- Home stadium: March Field

1898 Eastern college football independents records
	Conf.			Overall
Team	W	L	T	W		L		T
Harvard		–		11	–	0	–	0
Drexel		–		7	–	0	–	0
Princeton		–		11	–	0	–	1
Penn		–		12	–	1	–	0
Buffalo		–		8	–	1	–	0
Cornell		–		10	–	2	–	0
Swarthmore		–		9	–	2	–	0
Washington & Jefferson		–		9	–	2	–	0
Yale		–		9	–	2	–	0
Dickinson		–		8	–	2	–	0
Syracuse		–		8	–	2	–	1
Wesleyan		–		7	–	3	–	0
Western Penn.		–		5	–	2	–	1
Brown		–		6	–	4	–	0
Carlisle		–		6	–	4	–	0
Penn State		–		6	–	4	–	0
Pittsburgh College		–		6	–	4	–	1
Army		–		3	–	2	–	1
Vermont		–		3	–	2	–	1
Holy Cross		–		5	–	4	–	1
Bucknell		–		4	–	4	–	3
Fordham		–		1	–	1	–	2
Franklin & Marshall		–		4	–	4	–	2
New Hampshire		–		4	–	4	–	0
Amherst		–		4	–	5	–	1
Villanova		–		2	–	4	–	1
Lehigh		–		3	–	6	–	1
Boston College		–		2	–	5	–	1
Colgate		–		2	–	5	–	1
Temple		–		2	–	5	–	0
Lafayette		–		3	–	8	–	0
NYU		–		1	–	3	–	0
Rutgers		–		1	–	6	–	1
Tufts		–		1	–	9	–	0
Geneva		–		0	–	6	–	1

The 1898 Lafayette football team was an American football team that represented Lafayette College as an independent during the 1898 college football season. In its first season under head coach Samuel B. Newton, the team compiled a 3–8 record. Charles Best was the team captain. The team played its home games at March Field in Easton, Pennsylvania.

== Schedule ==
Date	Time	Opponent	Site	Result	Attendance	Source
October 1		Villanova	Easton, PA	W 16–0		
October 5		vs. Washington & Jefferson	Exposition Park; Pittsburgh, PA	L 0–16	2,500	
October 8		Penn State	Easton, PA	L 0–5		
October 12		at Princeton	Princeton, NJ	L 0–34	2,000	
October 15		Dickinson	Easton, PA	L 6–12		
October 22		at Penn	Franklin Field; Philadelphia, PA	L 0–32		
October 29		at Navy	Worden Field; Annapolis, MD	L 0–18		
November 5		at Lehigh	Bethlehem, PA (rivalry)	L 0–22		
November 12		at Cornell	Percy Field; Ithaca, NY	L 0–47		
November 19	2:00 p.m.	Bucknell	Easton, PA	W 6–0		
November 24		Lehigh	Easton, PA	W 11–5		
