= 1898 Syracuse Orangemen football team =

American college football season

1898 Syracuse Orangemen football
- Conference: Independent
- Record: 8–2–1
- Head coach: Frank E. Wade (2nd season)
- Captain: Morgan Wilcox
- Home stadium: Old Oval

1898 Eastern college football independents records
	Conf.			Overall
Team	W	L	T	W		L		T
Harvard		–		11	–	0	–	0
Drexel		–		7	–	0	–	0
Princeton		–		11	–	0	–	1
Penn		–		12	–	1	–	0
Buffalo		–		8	–	1	–	0
Cornell		–		10	–	2	–	0
Swarthmore		–		9	–	2	–	0
Washington & Jefferson		–		9	–	2	–	0
Yale		–		9	–	2	–	0
Dickinson		–		8	–	2	–	0
Syracuse		–		8	–	2	–	1
Wesleyan		–		7	–	3	–	0
Western Penn.		–		5	–	2	–	1
Brown		–		6	–	4	–	0
Carlisle		–		6	–	4	–	0
Penn State		–		6	–	4	–	0
Pittsburgh College		–		6	–	4	–	1
Army		–		3	–	2	–	1
Vermont		–		3	–	2	–	1
Holy Cross		–		5	–	4	–	1
Bucknell		–		4	–	4	–	3
Fordham		–		1	–	1	–	2
Franklin & Marshall		–		4	–	4	–	2
New Hampshire		–		4	–	4	–	0
Villanova		–		2	–	4	–	1
Lehigh		–		3	–	6	–	1
Boston College		–		2	–	5	–	1
Colgate		–		2	–	5	–	1
Temple		–		2	–	5	–	0
Lafayette		–		3	–	8	–	0
NYU		–		1	–	3	–	0
Rutgers		–		1	–	6	–	1
Tufts		–		1	–	9	–	0
Geneva		–		0	–	6	–	1

The 1898 Syracuse Orangemen football team represented Syracuse University as an independent during the 1898 college football season. The head coach was Frank E. Wade, coaching his second season with the Orangemen.

== Schedule ==
Date	Opponent	Site	Result	Source
September 21	at Cornell	Ithaca, NY	L 0–28	
October 1	Rochester	Syracuse, NY	W 35–0	
October 5	Cornell	Syracuse, NY	L 0–30	
October 12	at Hobart	Geneva, NY	W 46–5	
October 22	at Case	League Park; Cleveland, OH	W 10–0	
October 26	Syracuse Athletic Association	Syracuse, NY	W 28–0	
October 29	at Ogdensburg	Syracuse, NY	W 17–6	
November 5	NYU	Syracuse, NY	W 17–0	
November 9	Syracuse Athletic Association	Syracuse, NY	W 28–0	
November 12	at Wyoming Seminary	Kingston, PA	W 11–0	
November 19	Trinity (CT)	Syracuse, NY	T 0–0	
