= 1898 Boston College football team =

American college football season

1898 Boston College football
- Conference: Independent
- Record: 2–5–1
- Head coach: John Dunlop (2nd season)
- Captain: Bill Koen
- Home stadium: South End Grounds

1898 Eastern college football independents records
	Conf.			Overall
Team	W	L	T	W		L		T
Harvard		–		11	–	0	–	0
Drexel		–		7	–	0	–	0
Princeton		–		11	–	0	–	1
Penn		–		12	–	1	–	0
Buffalo		–		8	–	1	–	0
Cornell		–		10	–	2	–	0
Swarthmore		–		9	–	2	–	0
Washington & Jefferson		–		9	–	2	–	0
Yale		–		9	–	2	–	0
Dickinson		–		8	–	2	–	0
Syracuse		–		8	–	2	–	1
Wesleyan		–		7	–	3	–	0
Western Penn.		–		5	–	2	–	1
Brown		–		6	–	4	–	0
Carlisle		–		6	–	4	–	0
Penn State		–		6	–	4	–	0
Pittsburgh College		–		6	–	4	–	1
Army		–		3	–	2	–	1
Vermont		–		3	–	2	–	1
Holy Cross		–		5	–	4	–	1
Bucknell		–		4	–	4	–	3
Fordham		–		1	–	1	–	2
Franklin & Marshall		–		4	–	4	–	2
New Hampshire		–		4	–	4	–	0
Amherst		–		4	–	5	–	1
Villanova		–		2	–	4	–	1
Lehigh		–		3	–	6	–	1
Boston College		–		2	–	5	–	1
Colgate		–		2	–	5	–	1
Temple		–		2	–	5	–	0
Lafayette		–		3	–	8	–	0
NYU		–		1	–	3	–	0
Rutgers		–		1	–	6	–	1
Tufts		–		1	–	9	–	0
Geneva		–		0	–	6	–	1

The 1898 Boston College football team was an American football team that represented Boston College as an independent during the 1898 college football season. Led by second-year head coach John Dunlop, Boston College compiled a record of 2–5–1.

== Schedule ==
Date	Opponent	Site	Result	Source
October 9	Exeter Academy		L 0–18	
October 15	Newton Athletic Club		L 0–5	
October 22	vs. Tufts		L 5–6	
October 24	at Brown	Lincoln Field; Providence, RI	L 0–6	
October 29	at Campello Athletic Club		W 5–0	
November 5	at Holy Cross	Worcester College Grounds; Worcester, MA (rivalry)	T 0–0	
November 5	vs. MIT		L 0–6	
November 24	Holy Cross	South End Grounds; Boston, MA	W 11–0	
