= 1898 Wesleyan Methodists football team =

American college football season

1898 Wesleyan Methodists football
- Conference: Independent
- Record: 7–3
- Head coach: Robert P. Wilson (1st season)
- Home stadium: Andrus Field

1898 Eastern college football independents records
	Conf.			Overall
Team	W	L	T	W		L		T
Harvard		–		11	–	0	–	0
Drexel		–		7	–	0	–	0
Princeton		–		11	–	0	–	1
Penn		–		12	–	1	–	0
Buffalo		–		8	–	1	–	0
Cornell		–		10	–	2	–	0
Swarthmore		–		9	–	2	–	0
Washington & Jefferson		–		9	–	2	–	0
Yale		–		9	–	2	–	0
Dickinson		–		8	–	2	–	0
Syracuse		–		8	–	2	–	1
Wesleyan		–		7	–	3	–	0
Western Penn.		–		5	–	2	–	1
Brown		–		6	–	4	–	0
Carlisle		–		6	–	4	–	0
Penn State		–		6	–	4	–	0
Pittsburgh College		–		6	–	4	–	1
Army		–		3	–	2	–	1
Vermont		–		3	–	2	–	1
Holy Cross		–		5	–	4	–	1
Bucknell		–		4	–	4	–	3
Fordham		–		1	–	1	–	2
Franklin & Marshall		–		4	–	4	–	2
New Hampshire		–		4	–	4	–	0
Amherst		–		4	–	5	–	1
Villanova		–		2	–	4	–	1
Lehigh		–		3	–	6	–	1
Boston College		–		2	–	5	–	1
Colgate		–		2	–	5	–	1
Temple		–		2	–	5	–	0
Lafayette		–		3	–	8	–	0
NYU		–		1	–	3	–	0
Rutgers		–		1	–	6	–	1
Tufts		–		1	–	9	–	0
Geneva		–		0	–	6	–	1

The 1898 Wesleyan Methodists football team represented Wesleyan University as an independent during the 1898 college football season. Led by first-year head coach Robert P. Wilson, the Methodists compiled a record of 7–3. Wesleyan played home games at Andrus Field in Middletown, Connecticut.

== Schedule ==
Date	Time	Opponent	Site	Result	Attendance	Source
October 1		at Yale	Yale Field; New Haven, CT	L 0–5		
October 8	3:30 p.m.	at Army	The Plain; West Point, NY	L 8–27	1,500	
October 12		Holy Cross	Andrus Field; Middletown, CT	W 12–0		
October 15		Amherst	Middletown, CT	W 33–0		
October 19		at Penn	Franklin Field; Philadelphia, PA	L 0–17	3,500	
October 22		at Williams	Weston Field; Williamstown, MA	W 22–0		
October 26		at Amherst	Pratt Field; Amherst, MA	W 28–0		
October 29		at Dartmouth	Alumni Oval; Hanover, NH	W 23–5	700	
November 5		Trinity (CT)	Middletown, CT (rivalry)	W 30–0	800	
November 12	3:00 p.m.	Rutgers	Andrus Field; Middletown, CT	W 59–0		
