= 1898 Washington & Jefferson football team =

American college football season

1898 Washington & Jefferson football
- Conference: Independent
- Record: 9–2
- Head coach: William D. Inglis (1st season)
- Captain: Bill Theurer
- Home stadium: College Park

1898 Eastern college football independents records
	Conf.			Overall
Team	W	L	T	W		L		T
Harvard		–		11	–	0	–	0
Drexel		–		7	–	0	–	0
Princeton		–		11	–	0	–	1
Penn		–		12	–	1	–	0
Buffalo		–		8	–	1	–	0
Cornell		–		10	–	2	–	0
Swarthmore		–		9	–	2	–	0
Washington & Jefferson		–		9	–	2	–	0
Yale		–		9	–	2	–	0
Dickinson		–		8	–	2	–	0
Syracuse		–		8	–	2	–	1
Wesleyan		–		7	–	3	–	0
Western Penn.		–		5	–	2	–	1
Brown		–		6	–	4	–	0
Carlisle		–		6	–	4	–	0
Penn State		–		6	–	4	–	0
Pittsburgh College		–		6	–	4	–	1
Army		–		3	–	2	–	1
Vermont		–		3	–	2	–	1
Holy Cross		–		5	–	4	–	1
Bucknell		–		4	–	4	–	3
Fordham		–		1	–	1	–	2
Franklin & Marshall		–		4	–	4	–	2
New Hampshire		–		4	–	4	–	0
Amherst		–		4	–	5	–	1
Villanova		–		2	–	4	–	1
Lehigh		–		3	–	6	–	1
Boston College		–		2	–	5	–	1
Colgate		–		2	–	5	–	1
Temple		–		2	–	5	–	0
Lafayette		–		3	–	8	–	0
NYU		–		1	–	3	–	0
Rutgers		–		1	–	6	–	1
Tufts		–		1	–	9	–	0
Geneva		–		0	–	6	–	1

The 1898 Washington & Jefferson football team was an American football team that represented Washington & Jefferson College as an independent during the 1898 college football season. Led by William D. Inglis in his first and only year as head coach, the team compiled a record of 9–2.

== Schedule ==
Date	Time	Opponent	Site	Result	Attendance	Source
September 24		Marietta	Fair grounds; Washington, PA	W 24–0	2,500	
October 1		Westminster (PA)	College Park; Washington, PA	W 34–0	500	
October 5		vs. Lafayette	Exposition Park; Pittsburgh, PA	W 16–0	2,500	
October 8		at Jefferson Athletic Association	Canonsburg, PA	W 29–0	400	
October 15	3:20 p.m.	Ohio Medical	Washington, PA	W forfeit	500–600	
October 19		Jefferson Athletic Association	Washington, PA	W 46–0		
October 30		at Pittsburgh Athletic Club	P. A. C. Park; Pittsburgh, PA	W 11–0	2,500	
November 9		Allegheny	College Park; Washington, PA	W 68–0		
November 12	3:45 p.m.	at Western Reserve	Adelbert Field; Cleveland, OH	W 8–6	1,200	
November 19		Penn State	Washington, PA	L 6–11	1,200	
November 24		at Duquesne Country and Athletic Club	Exposition Park; Pittsburgh, PA	L 0–11		
