= 1898 Army Cadets football team =

American college football season

1898 Army Cadets football
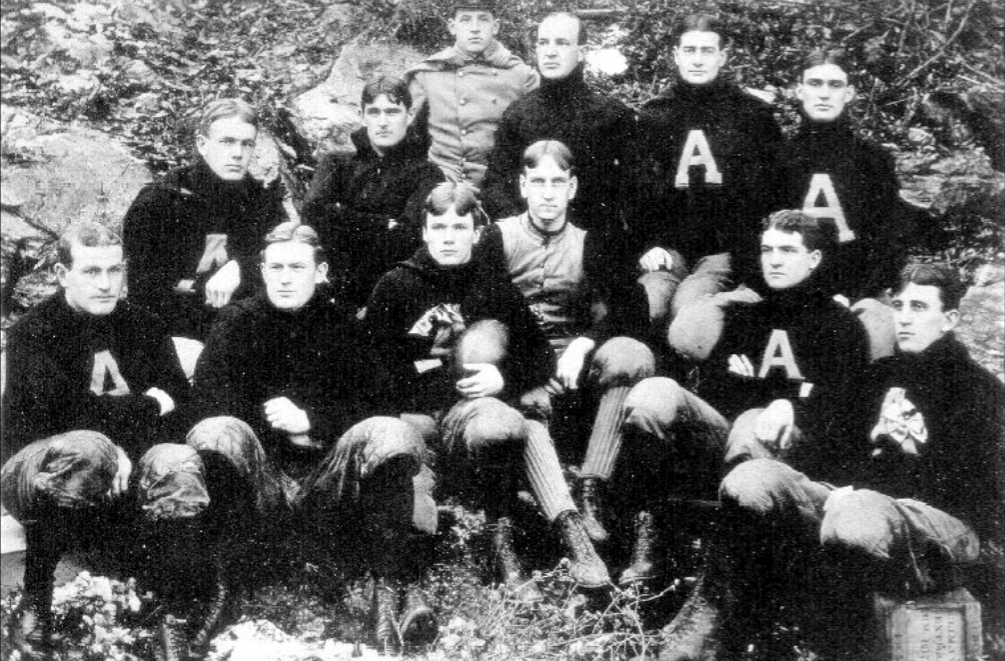
- Conference: Independent
- Record: 3–2–1
- Head coach: Herman Koehler (2nd season)
- Captain: Leon Kromer
- Home stadium: The Plain

1898 Eastern college football independents records
	Conf.			Overall
Team	W	L	T	W		L		T
Harvard		–		11	–	0	–	0
Drexel		–		7	–	0	–	0
Princeton		–		11	–	0	–	1
Penn		–		12	–	1	–	0
Buffalo		–		8	–	1	–	0
Cornell		–		10	–	2	–	0
Swarthmore		–		9	–	2	–	0
Washington & Jefferson		–		9	–	2	–	0
Yale		–		9	–	2	–	0
Dickinson		–		8	–	2	–	0
Syracuse		–		8	–	2	–	1
Wesleyan		–		7	–	3	–	0
Western Penn.		–		5	–	2	–	1
Brown		–		6	–	4	–	0
Carlisle		–		6	–	4	–	0
Penn State		–		6	–	4	–	0
Pittsburgh College		–		6	–	4	–	1
Army		–		3	–	2	–	1
Vermont		–		3	–	2	–	1
Holy Cross		–		5	–	4	–	1
Bucknell		–		4	–	4	–	3
Fordham		–		1	–	1	–	2
Franklin & Marshall		–		4	–	4	–	2
New Hampshire		–		4	–	4	–	0
Villanova		–		2	–	4	–	1
Lehigh		–		3	–	6	–	1
Boston College		–		2	–	5	–	1
Colgate		–		2	–	5	–	1
Temple		–		2	–	5	–	0
Lafayette		–		3	–	8	–	0
NYU		–		1	–	3	–	0
Rutgers		–		1	–	6	–	1
Tufts		–		1	–	9	–	0
Geneva		–		0	–	6	–	1

The 1898 Army Cadets football team represented the United States Military Academy as an independent during the 1898 college football season. In their second season under head coach Herman Koehler, the Cadets compiled a 3–2–1 record and outscored their opponents by a combined total of 90 to 51. The Cadets' two losses came against undefeated co-national champion Harvard and Yale. The Army–Navy Game was not played in 1898.

Four Army Cadets were honored on the 1898 College Football All-America Team. Fullback Charles Romeyn was a consensus first-team All-American, receiving first-team honors from Caspar Whitney and the New York Sun. Quarterback Leon Kromer, tackle Robert Foy, and end Walter Smith were recognized as third-team All-Americans by Walter Camp.

== Schedule ==
Date	Time	Opponent	Site	Result	Attendance	Source
October 1		Tufts	The Plain; West Point, NY	W 40–0		
October 8	3:30 p.m.	Wesleyan	The Plain; West Point, NY	W 27–8	1,500	
October 15		Harvard	The Plain; West Point, NY	L 0–28		
October 22		Lehigh	The Plain; West Point, NY	W 18–0		
October 29		Yale	The Plain; West Point, NY	L 0–10	5,000	
November 5		Princeton	The Plain; West Point, NY	T 5–5	5,000	
All times are in Eastern time
