= 1898 Lehigh football team =

American college football season

1898 Lehigh football
- Conference: Independent
- Record: 3–6–1
- Head coach: Samuel Huston Thompson (1st season)

1898 Eastern college football independents records
	Conf.			Overall
Team	W	L	T	W		L		T
Harvard		–		11	–	0	–	0
Drexel		–		7	–	0	–	0
Princeton		–		11	–	0	–	1
Penn		–		12	–	1	–	0
Buffalo		–		8	–	1	–	0
Cornell		–		10	–	2	–	0
Swarthmore		–		9	–	2	–	0
Washington & Jefferson		–		9	–	2	–	0
Yale		–		9	–	2	–	0
Dickinson		–		8	–	2	–	0
Syracuse		–		8	–	2	–	1
Wesleyan		–		7	–	3	–	0
Western Penn.		–		5	–	2	–	1
Brown		–		6	–	4	–	0
Carlisle		–		6	–	4	–	0
Penn State		–		6	–	4	–	0
Pittsburgh College		–		6	–	4	–	1
Army		–		3	–	2	–	1
Vermont		–		3	–	2	–	1
Holy Cross		–		5	–	4	–	1
Bucknell		–		4	–	4	–	3
Fordham		–		1	–	1	–	2
Frankin & Marshall		–		4	–	4	–	2
New Hampshire		–		4	–	4	–	0
Amherst		–		4	–	5	–	1
Villanova		–		2	–	4	–	1
Lehigh		–		3	–	6	–	1
Boston College		–		2	–	5	–	1
Colgate		–		2	–	5	–	1
Temple		–		2	–	5	–	0
Lafayette		–		3	–	8	–	0
NYU		–		1	–	3	–	0
Rutgers		–		1	–	6	–	1
Tufts		–		1	–	9	–	0
Geneva		–		0	–	6	–	1

The 1898 Lehigh football team was an American football team that represented Lehigh University as an independent during the 1898 college football season. In its first season under head coach Samuel Huston Thompson, the team compiled a 3–6–1 record and was outscored by a total of 106 to 49.

== Schedule ==
Date	Time	Opponent	Site	Result	Attendance	Source
September 28		Rutgers	Bethlehem, PA	W 12–0		
October 1		at Princeton	University Field; Princeton, NJ	L 0–21		
October 8		at NYU	Ohio Field; Bronx, NY	L 0–10	200	
October 15		at Penn	Franklin Field; Philadelphia, PA	L 0–40		
October 22		at Army	The Plain; West Point, NY	L 0–18		
October 29	2:30 p.m.	Bucknell	Bethlehem, PA	T 0–0		
November 5		Lafayette	Bethlehem, PA (rivalry)	W 22–0		
November 12		at Navy	Worden Field; Annapolis, MD	L 5–6		
November 19		Maryland Athletic Club	Bethlehem, PA	W 5–0		
November 24		at Lafayette	March Field; Easton, PA	L 5–11		
