= 1898 Western University of Pennsylvania football team =

American college football season

1898 Western University of Pennsylvania football
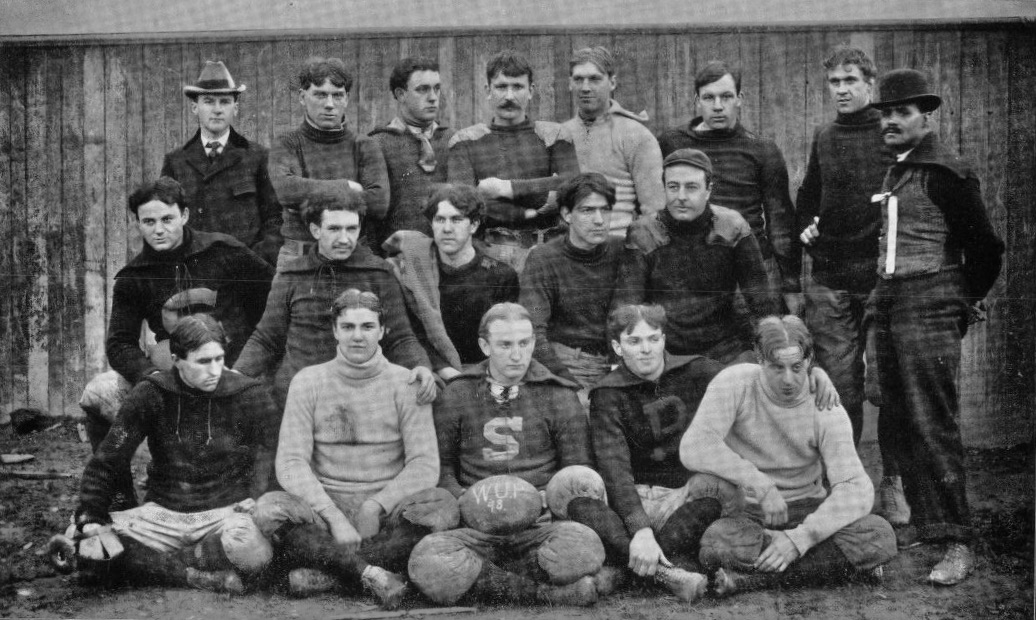
- Conference: Independent
- Record: 3–2–1
- Head coach: Frederick A. Robison (1st season)

1898 Eastern college football independents records
	Conf.			Overall
Team	W	L	T	W		L		T
Harvard		–		11	–	0	–	0
Drexel		–		7	–	0	–	0
Princeton		–		11	–	0	–	1
Penn		–		12	–	1	–	0
Buffalo		–		8	–	1	–	0
Cornell		–		10	–	2	–	0
Swarthmore		–		9	–	2	–	0
Washington & Jefferson		–		9	–	2	–	0
Yale		–		9	–	2	–	0
Dickinson		–		8	–	2	–	0
Syracuse		–		8	–	2	–	1
Wesleyan		–		7	–	3	–	0
Western Penn.		–		5	–	2	–	1
Brown		–		6	–	4	–	0
Carlisle		–		6	–	4	–	0
Penn State		–		6	–	4	–	0
Pittsburgh College		–		6	–	4	–	1
Army		–		3	–	2	–	1
Vermont		–		3	–	2	–	1
Holy Cross		–		5	–	4	–	1
Bucknell		–		4	–	4	–	3
Fordham		–		1	–	1	–	2
Franklin & Marshall		–		4	–	4	–	2
New Hampshire		–		4	–	4	–	0
Villanova		–		2	–	4	–	1
Lehigh		–		3	–	6	–	1
Boston College		–		2	–	5	–	1
Colgate		–		2	–	5	–	1
Temple		–		2	–	5	–	0
Lafayette		–		3	–	8	–	0
NYU		–		1	–	3	–	0
Rutgers		–		1	–	6	–	1
Tufts		–		1	–	9	–	0
Geneva		–		0	–	6	–	1

The 1898 Western University of Pennsylvania football team was an American football team that represented the Western University of Pennsylvania (now known as the University of Pittsburgh) as an independent during the 1898 college football season.

== Schedule ==
Date	Opponent	Site	Result	Attendance	Source
October 12	Pittsburgh Academy	Recreation Park; Pittsburgh, PA	W 24–5		
October 19	Westminster (PA)	Recreation Park; Pittsburgh, PA	W 5–0		
October 26	D. C. & A. C.	Recreation Park; Pittsburgh, PA	cancelled		
November 4	vs. West Virginia	Fairmont, WV (Backyard Brawl)	L 0–5		
November 5	at West Virginia	Morgantown, WV	cancelled		
November 8	Greensburg Athletic Club	Pittsburgh, PA	cancelled		
November 15	Grove City	Recreation Park; Pittsburgh, PA	L 10–12		
November 19	at Natrona Athletic Club	Natrona, PA	W 17–0		
November 21	Penn State	Pittsburgh, PA	cancelled		
November 24	at New Castle Terrors	New Castle, PA	T 6–6	1,000	

== Season recap ==
The 1898 football team at the Western University of Pennsylvania (WUP) was led by Dr. Fred Robison. Dr. Robison was a graduate of State College and former player who lettered on their 1894 team. He also played for the Greensburg Athletic Association. He was registered in the Dental School so he was basically a graduate school player/coach. The manager, Edwin L. Thomas, had some scheduling problems due to the late formation of the team and unexpected cancellations, but managed to put together a reasonable slate of games with both college and club teams. Coach Robison also formed a sophomore team that played a six-game schedule. In its first season under Robison, the team compiled a 3–2–1 record and outscored opponents by a total of 68 to 34. Ultimately, Dr. Robison led the WUP varsity eleven to back-to-back winning seasons while pursuing his Dental degree.

== Game summaries ==
=== Pittsburgh Academy ===
Pittsburgh Academy at WUP

Team	1	2	Total
Pittsburgh Academy	0	5	5
• WUP	18	6	24

- Date: October 12, 1898
- Location: Recreation Park, Pittsburgh

Coach Robison scheduled a practice game with the Pittsburgh Academy to choose his varsity starting line-up. On October 12 at Recreation Park, the WUP varsity defeated the Pittsburgh Academy by a score of 24–5. On the Western U.'s first possession, halfback Robison quickly penetrated the Academy's defense and scored a touchdown. WUP fullback B. L. Rosenbloom converted the goal kick after. After the ensuing kickoff, tackle William Mitchell and B. L. Rosenbloom carried the ball down the field for the second touchdown. Rosenbloom again converted the goal kick after. The Academy boys then put together an offensive drive and got within five yards of the goal but lost the ball on downs. Robison then raced the ball to the Academy five and the WUP offense proceeded to score again right before halftime.

In the second half Coach Robison substituted freely and gave everyone a chance to earn a spot on the roster. Late in the game the Academy eleven were able to work the ball deep into Western U. territory and score a touchdown.

The WUP starting lineup for the Pittsburgh Academy game was Victor King (left end), Allen (left tackle), John Munden (left guard), James Chessrown (center), Weber (right guard), William Mitchell (right tackle), Clarence Burleigh (right end), Clyde Sample (left halfback), Fred Robison (right halfback), Charles Blair (quarterback) and B. L. Rosenbloom (fullback). The substitutes that saw action were Chester Fisher, George Dale, Herman Watt, William Hanson, Glendenning and Price.

=== Westminster (PA) ===
Westminster at WUP

Team	1	2	Total
Westminster	0	0	0
• WUP	5	0	5

- Date: October 19, 1898
- Location: Recreation Park, Pittsburgh
- Referee: Crombie Allen

On October 19, Westminster College was the opponent at Recreation Park for the Western University"s first game. Coach Robison scampered 45 yards for a touchdown early in the first half, but Al Marshall could not convert the goal after. The score stood at 5–0. Coach Robison allowed everyone to carry the ball but there were no more scores in the first half.

In the second half, the ball stayed mainly on Westminster's side of the field but again neither team was able to score and the final tally remained 5–0 in favor of the home team. The sportswriters were impressed with the play of Robison, Hanson, Hagerty, King, Mitchell, and Windeknecht.

The WUP lineup for the Westminster game was Al Marshall (left end), Hagerty (left tackle), Allen (left guard), James Chessrown (center), Windeknecht (right guard), William Mitchell (right tackle), Victor King (right end), Charles Blair (quarterback), William Hanson (left halfback), Fred Robison (right halfback) and Glendenning (fullback).

=== Duquesne Country and Athletic Club ===
The D.C. & A.C. was also impressed with the play of the WUP eleven and rearranged their schedule to play the Westerns on the following Wednesday (October 26 ). The game was ultimately cancelled because someone referred to the game as a practice game for the D.C. & A.C. and the University lads became miffed with that appraisal and refused to play.

=== At West Virginia (November 4) ===
WUP at West Virginia

Team	1	2	Total
WUP	0	0	0
• West Virginia	0	5	5

- Date: November 4, 1898
- Location: Fairmont Grounds, Fairmont, WV

On November 4, the Western University contingent traveled to Fairmont, West Virginia to take on the Mountaineers of West Virginia University in the first game of what was supposed to be a two game road trip. The game was played on a rough field with tall grass so it turned into a defensive struggle with many fumbles. Late in the second half Mountaineer fullback Yeager was able to score a touchdown and West Virginia won the game 5–0.

=== At West Virginia (November 5) ===
The same teams were to play again on November 5 in Morgantown but the game was cancelled.

=== Greensburg Athletic Association ===
The November 8 game scheduled with the Greensburg Athletic Association was cancelled. Greensburg had played Latrobe Athletic Association on Saturday the 5th and were too banged up to field a healthy opponent for the Western University eleven. This was the third cancellation in a two week period.

=== Grove City ===
Grove City at WUP

Team	1	2	Total
• Grove City	0	12	12
WUP	10	0	10

- Date: November 15, 1898
- Location: Recreation Park, Pittsburgh
- Referee: J. W. McCleary

On November 15, Grove City College battled the Western University eleven at Recreation Park. Grove City did not fear the 1898 edition of WUP football and started some substitutes and moved some players into different positions in the line-up. Early in the first half the WUP offense, behind the running of Coach Fred Robison and Rosenbloom, advanced the ball steadily down the field and Robison finally scored a touchdown from the three yard line. The goal kick after by Rosenbloom failed. Grove City kicked off and Robison caught the ball on the thirteen and raced 87 yards for his second touchdown of the afternoon. Rosenbloom's second attempt at the goal kick after also failed. Late in the first half Grove City was able to move the ball on offense. They managed to penetrate the WUP defense to the three yard line but the Western U. defense stiffened and held Grove City scoreless in the first half.

At halftime Grove City adjusted their line-up and played their first string. Grove City received the kickoff and moved the ball into WUP territory. Halfback Shannon raced the last twenty-five yards for the Grove City touchdown. Shannon also converted the goal kick after. The Western U. again kicked off and their defense was able to get the ball back but the offense could not penetrate the Grove City defense. Both ends for the WUP eleven were injured and replaced with Malcolm McConnell and Chester Fisher. With Grove City back on offense, Fiscus of Grove City got loose on a twenty-seven yard run around left end to score their second touchdown. Shannon again converted the goal kick after and the WUP was defeated 12–10.

The WUP lineup for the Grove City game was Al Marshall (left end), Allen (left tackle), Weber (left guard), James Chessrown (center), Windeknecht (right guard), Glendenning (right tackle), Victor King (right end), Henry Seitz (quarterback), William Mitchell (left halfback), Fred Robison (right halfback) and B. L. Rosenbloom (fullback).

=== At Natrona Athletic Club ===
WUP at Natrona A. C.

Team	1	2	Total
• WUP	11	5	16
Natrona A. C.	0	0	0

- Date: November 19, 1898
- Location: Natrona Grounds, Natrona, PA

On November 19, the Natrona Athletic Club hosted the WUP eleven for a rainy, muddy game of football. The Western U. kicked off and their defense forced Natrona to give up the ball. WUP backs Mitchell, Rosenbloom and Coach Fred Robison alternately carried the ball downfield with Robison finally scoring a touchdown four minutes into the game. Robison's goal kick after was unsuccessful. Later in the half Rosenbloom carried the ball into the end zone for a second WUP touchdown. His goal after kick was good and WUP led 11–0 at halftime.

The Westerns scored on their first possession of the second half with Robison advancing the ball the last thirty yards for the final touchdown of the day. Rosenbloom missed the goal kick after. The crowd then became rowdy and tried to interfere with play. Natrona kicked off and Robison dashed down the sideline and ran into a spectator. He fumbled and Natrona recovered. Natrona was able to move the ball but time expired before they could score. The final score was 16–0 in favor of WUP.

The WUP lineup for the game with Natona A. C. was Al Marshall (left end), Malcolm McConnell (left tackle), Allen (left guard), James Chessrown (center), Windeknecht (right guard), Glendenning (right tackle), Chester Fisher (right end), Henry Seitz (quarterback), Fred Robison (left halfback), William Mitchell (right halfback) and B. L. Rosenbloom (fullback).

=== Penn State ===
The November 19, 1898 Pittsburgh Post-Gazette reported "The game scheduled between the State college and W.U.P. teams for Monday has been declared off, as the State college faculty was opposed to a game just before Thanksgiving Day."

=== At New Castle Terrors ===
WUP at New Castle Terrors

Team	1	2	Total
WUP	6	0	6
New Castle	6	0	6

- Date: November 24, 1898
- Location: New Castle Grounds, New Castle, PA
- Game attendance: 1,000
- Referee: King (WUP)

On Thanksgiving Day in New Castle, Pennsylvania, approximately 1,000 fans were entertained by the New Castle Terrors and Western University football game. The opposing elevens fiercely contested every play and there were numerous players temporarily knocked out. Eight minutes into the game McClintock scored a touchdown for New Castle and the goal kick after was successful. The WUP defense managed to secure the ball on the New Castle forty-five yard line. The WUP offense advanced the ball deep into New Castle territory. After a loss of yards and penalty, the offense was able to score the touchdown. The goal kick after was good and the score was tied 6–6 at halftime.

The second half was a defensive struggle with the ball remaining on the WUP side of the field for most of the half. Both defenses played well and neither team was able to score. The final result was a 6–6 tie.

After arriving back in Pittsburgh, the players complained about the rowdy fans and unfair officiating at New Castle. The WUP football team never played the Terrors again.

The WUP lineup for the game against New Castle was Al Marshall (left end), Allen (left tackle), Weber (left guard), James Chessrown (center), Windeknecht (right guard), Glendenning (right tackle), Victor King (right end), Henry Seitz (quarterback), William Mitchell (left halfback), Fred Robison (right halfback) and B. L. Rosenbloom (fullback).

== Roster ==
The roster of the 1898 Western University of Pennsylvania football team:

- Chester G. Fisher (end) received his degree in Mechanical Engineering in 1900 and resided in Pittsburgh.
- A. A. Marshall (left end) received his Bachelor of Philosophy degree in 1894 and was in the Law School class of 1897. He previously played football for the Allegheny Athletic Association.
- James H. Chessrown (center) earned his Doctor of Dental Surgery degree in 1901 and resided in Youngstown, Ohio.
- Victor King (end) earned his Doctor of Medicine degree in 1901 and resided in Pittsburgh.
- Charles R. Blair (quarterback) received his Doctor of Dental Surgery degree in 1899 and resided in Latrobe, Pa.
- Henry A. Seitz (quarterback) received his Doctor of Dental Surgery degree in 1899 and resided in Freeport, Pa.
- William Mitchell (halfback) earned his degree in Mechanical Engineering in 1901 and resided in Niagara Falls, N.Y.
- B. L. Rosenbloom (fullback) earned his Associate Law degree in 1900 and resided in North Braddock, Pa.
- William H. Cullers (substitute) received his degree in Civil Engineering in 1901 and resided in Portland, Oregon.
- Malcolm F. McConnell (substitute) received his Mechanical Engineering degree in 1902 and worked for the Carnegie Steel Company in Steubenville, Ohio.
- William Hansen (substitute) received his Mechanical Engineering degree in 1901 and resided in Penn Station, Pa.
- Clarence Burleigh (end) earned his Associate Law degree in 1903 and resided in Pittsburgh.
- John J. Munden (guard) earned his Doctor of Medicine degree in 1901 and resided in Pittsburgh.
- Herman E. Watt (guard) received his Mechanical Engineering degree in 1901 and resided in Huntington, West Virginia.
- George C. Dale (substitute) earned his Doctor of Dental Surgery degree in 1901 and resided in Grove City, Pa.
- Clyde Sample (substitute) earned his Associate College degree in 1901 and resided in Wilkinsburg, Pa.
- John Miller (halfback) received his degree in Mechanical Engineering in 1901 and resided in Ford City, Pa.
- Philip Price (substitute) earned his degree in Civil Engineering in 1899 and resided in Pittsburgh.
- Allen (tackle)
- Weber (guard)
- Windeknecht (guard)
- Kennedy (tackle)
- Glendenning (tackle)
- Graw (substitute)
- Orr (substitute)
- Hagerty (substitute)
- Brownlee (substitute)

== Coaching staff ==
- Frederick A. Robison (coach/halfback) earned his Doctor of Dental Surgery degree in 1900 and resided in State College.
- Edwin L. Thomas (manager) earned his Associate Engineering degree in 1899 and worked for the Jones & Laughlin Company.
