= 1898 Carlisle Indians football team =

American college football season

1898 Carlisle Indians football
- Conference: Independent
- Record: 6–4
- Head coach: John A. Hall (1st season)
- Captain: Frank Hudson

1898 Eastern college football independents records
	Conf.			Overall
Team	W	L	T	W		L		T
Harvard		–		11	–	0	–	0
Drexel		–		7	–	0	–	0
Princeton		–		11	–	0	–	1
Penn		–		12	–	1	–	0
Buffalo		–		8	–	1	–	0
Cornell		–		10	–	2	–	0
Swarthmore		–		9	–	2	–	0
Washington & Jefferson		–		9	–	2	–	0
Yale		–		9	–	2	–	0
Dickinson		–		8	–	2	–	0
Syracuse		–		8	–	2	–	1
Wesleyan		–		7	–	3	–	0
Western Penn.		–		5	–	2	–	1
Brown		–		6	–	4	–	0
Carlisle		–		6	–	4	–	0
Penn State		–		6	–	4	–	0
Pittsburgh College		–		6	–	4	–	1
Army		–		3	–	2	–	1
Vermont		–		3	–	2	–	1
Holy Cross		–		5	–	4	–	1
Bucknell		–		4	–	4	–	3
Fordham		–		1	–	1	–	2
Franklin & Marshall		–		4	–	4	–	2
New Hampshire		–		4	–	4	–	0
Villanova		–		2	–	4	–	1
Lehigh		–		3	–	6	–	1
Boston College		–		2	–	5	–	1
Colgate		–		2	–	5	–	1
Temple		–		2	–	5	–	0
Lafayette		–		3	–	8	–	0
NYU		–		1	–	3	–	0
Rutgers		–		1	–	6	–	1
Tufts		–		1	–	9	–	0
Geneva		–		0	–	6	–	1

The 1898 Carlisle Indians football team represented the Carlisle Indian Industrial School as an independent during the 1898 college football season. Led by John A. Hall in his first only season as head coach, the Indians compiled a 6–4 record and outscored opponents by a total of 203 to 99.

Key players included Frank Cayou, Frank Hudson, Bemus Pierce, Hawley Pierce, and Eddie Rogers. Hudson, the team captain, was selected by Outing magazine as the first-team quarterback on its 1898 All-America college football team.

== Schedule ==
Date	Opponent	Site	Result	Attendance	Source
September 24	Bloomsburg Normal	Carlisle, PA	W 43–0		
October 1	Susquehanna	Carlisle, PA	W 48–0	1,000	
October 8	at Cornell	Percy Field; Ithaca, NY	L 6–23		
October 15	vs. Williams	Ridgefield Athletic Park; Albany, NY	W 17–6	3,000	
October 22	at Yale	Yale Field; New Haven, CT	L 5–18	2,500	
October 29	at Harvard	Soldier's Field; Boston, MA	L 5–11		
November 5	Dickinson	Carlisle, PA	W 46–0	3,000	
November 12	at Penn	Franklin Field; Philadelphia, PA	L 5–35		
November 19	vs. Illinois	Jackson Park; Chicago, IL	W 11–0	2,000	
December 3	Dartmouth	Carlisle, PA	W 17–6		
