= 1898 Pittsburgh College football team =

American college football season

1898 Pittsburgh College football
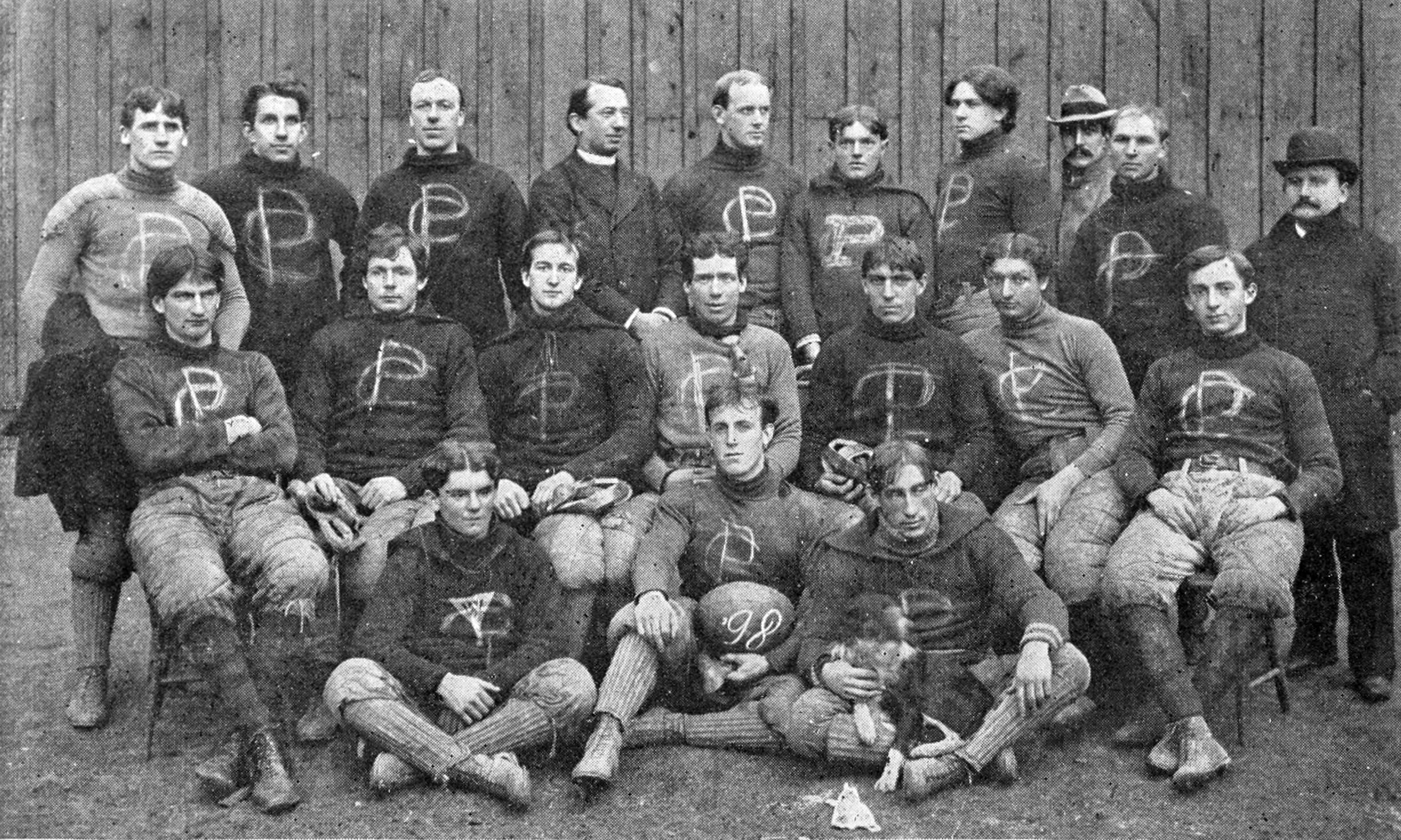
- Conference: Independent
- Record: 6–4–1
- Head coach: John Van Cleve (1st season)
- Captain: James Burns

1898 Eastern college football independents records
	Conf.			Overall
Team	W	L	T	W		L		T
Harvard		–		11	–	0	–	0
Drexel		–		7	–	0	–	0
Princeton		–		11	–	0	–	1
Penn		–		12	–	1	–	0
Buffalo		–		8	–	1	–	0
Cornell		–		10	–	2	–	0
Swarthmore		–		9	–	2	–	0
Washington & Jefferson		–		9	–	2	–	0
Yale		–		9	–	2	–	0
Dickinson		–		8	–	2	–	0
Syracuse		–		8	–	2	–	1
Wesleyan		–		7	–	3	–	0
Western Penn.		–		5	–	2	–	1
Brown		–		6	–	4	–	0
Carlisle		–		6	–	4	–	0
Penn State		–		6	–	4	–	0
Pittsburgh College		–		6	–	4	–	1
Army		–		3	–	2	–	1
Vermont		–		3	–	2	–	1
Holy Cross		–		5	–	4	–	1
Bucknell		–		4	–	4	–	3
Fordham		–		1	–	1	–	2
Franklin & Marshall		–		4	–	4	–	2
New Hampshire		–		4	–	4	–	0
Amherst		–		4	–	5	–	1
Villanova		–		2	–	4	–	1
Lehigh		–		3	–	6	–	1
Boston College		–		2	–	5	–	1
Colgate		–		2	–	5	–	1
Temple		–		2	–	5	–	0
Lafayette		–		3	–	8	–	0
NYU		–		1	–	3	–	0
Rutgers		–		1	–	6	–	1
Tufts		–		1	–	9	–	0
Geneva		–		0	–	6	–	1

The 1898 Pittsburgh College football team was an American football team that represented Pittsburgh Catholic College of the Holy Ghost—now known as Duquesne University—during the 1898 college football season. John Van Cleve served in his first and only season as the team's head coach.

== Schedule ==
Date	Time	Opponent	Site	Result	Source
October 1	3:00 p.m.	Geneva	Pittsburgh College grounds; Pittsburgh, PA	W 23–5	
October 8	3:30 p.m.	at Pittsburgh Athletic Club	P.A.C. Park; Pittsburgh, PA	T 0–0	
October 12		Latrobe Athletic Association	Pittsburgh College grounds; Pittsburgh, PA	L 0–17	
October 15		Swissvale Athletic Club	Pittsburgh College grounds; Pittsburgh, PA	W 17–0	
October 22		at Duquesne Country and Athletic Club	Exposition Park; Allegheny, PA	L 0–16	
October 29		at Steubenville Acme Club	Steubenville, OH	W 16–0	
November 2		Greensburg Athletic Association	Pittsburgh College grounds; Pittsburgh, PA	L 0–11	
November 8		at Latrobe Athletic Association	Latrobe, Pennsylvania	L 6–22	
November 16		Homestead Athletic Club	Pittsburgh College grounds; Pittsburgh, PA	W 28–5	
November 19		at Homestead Athletic Club	Homestead, PA	W 10–0	
November 24		Wheeling Athletic Club	Wheeling, WV	W 11–0	
All times are in Eastern time
