= 1898 Vermont Green and Gold football team =

American college football season

1898 Vermont Green and Gold football
- Conference: Independent
- Record: 3–2–1
- Head coach: D. M. McLaughlin (1st season)
- Home stadium: Athletic Park

1898 Eastern college football independents records
| | Conf. | | | Overall |
| Team | W | L | T | W | | L | | T |
|---|---|---|---|---|---|---|---|---|
| Harvard | | – | | 11 | – | 0 | – | 0 |
| Drexel | | – | | 7 | – | 0 | – | 0 |
| Princeton | | – | | 11 | – | 0 | – | 1 |
| Penn | | – | | 12 | – | 1 | – | 0 |
| Buffalo | | – | | 8 | – | 1 | – | 0 |
| Cornell | | – | | 10 | – | 2 | – | 0 |
| Swarthmore | | – | | 9 | – | 2 | – | 0 |
| Washington & Jefferson | | – | | 9 | – | 2 | – | 0 |
| Yale | | – | | 9 | – | 2 | – | 0 |
| Dickinson | | – | | 8 | – | 2 | – | 0 |
| Syracuse | | – | | 8 | – | 2 | – | 1 |
| Wesleyan | | – | | 7 | – | 3 | – | 0 |
| Western Penn. | | – | | 5 | – | 2 | – | 1 |
| Brown | | – | | 6 | – | 4 | – | 0 |
| Carlisle | | – | | 6 | – | 4 | – | 0 |
| Penn State | | – | | 6 | – | 4 | – | 0 |
| Pittsburgh College | | – | | 6 | – | 4 | – | 1 |
| Army | | – | | 3 | – | 2 | – | 1 |
| Vermont | | – | | 3 | – | 2 | – | 1 |
| Holy Cross | | – | | 5 | – | 4 | – | 1 |
| Bucknell | | – | | 4 | – | 4 | – | 3 |
| Fordham | | – | | 1 | – | 1 | – | 2 |
| Franklin & Marshall | | – | | 4 | – | 4 | – | 2 |
| New Hampshire | | – | | 4 | – | 4 | – | 0 |
| Amherst | | – | | 4 | – | 5 | – | 1 |
| Villanova | | – | | 2 | – | 4 | – | 1 |
| Lehigh | | – | | 3 | – | 6 | – | 1 |
| Boston College | | – | | 2 | – | 5 | – | 1 |
| Colgate | | – | | 2 | – | 5 | – | 1 |
| Temple | | – | | 2 | – | 5 | – | 0 |
| Lafayette | | – | | 3 | – | 8 | – | 0 |
| NYU | | – | | 1 | – | 3 | – | 0 |
| Rutgers | | – | | 1 | – | 6 | – | 1 |
| Tufts | | – | | 1 | – | 9 | – | 0 |
| Geneva | | – | | 0 | – | 6 | – | 1 |

The 1898 Vermont Green and Gold football team was an American football team that represented the University of Vermont as an independent during the 1898 college football season. In their first year under head coach D. M. McLaughlin, the team compiled a 3–2–1 record.

== Schedule ==
| Date | Opponent | Site | Result | Source |
|---|---|---|---|---|
| October 8 | Rutland Institute | Athletic Park; Burlington, VT | T 5–5 | |
| October 17 | Montpelier Seminary | Athletic Park; Burlington, VT | W 23–0 | |
| October 22 | Dartmouth | Athletic Park; Burlington, VT | L 6–45 | |
| November 2 | Montpelier Seminary | Athletic Park; Burlington, VT | W 11–0 | |
| November 5 | vs. Ogdensburg Athletic Association | (Canada) M.A.A.C. Grounds; Montreal, QC | W 10–5 | |
| November 12 | at Holy Cross | Worcester College Grounds; Worcester, MA | L 5–17 | |
