= 1898 Princeton Tigers football team =

American college football season

1898 Princeton Tigers football
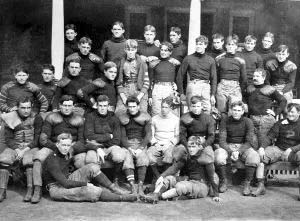

National champion (Davis)
- Conference: Independent
- Record: 11–0–1
- Head coach: None
- Captain: Art Hillebrand

1898 Eastern college football independents records
	Conf.			Overall
Team	W	L	T	W		L		T
Harvard		–		11	–	0	–	0
Drexel		–		7	–	0	–	0
Princeton		–		11	–	0	–	1
Penn		–		12	–	1	–	0
Buffalo		–		8	–	1	–	0
Cornell		–		10	–	2	–	0
Swarthmore		–		9	–	2	–	0
Washington & Jefferson		–		9	–	2	–	0
Yale		–		9	–	2	–	0
Dickinson		–		8	–	2	–	0
Syracuse		–		8	–	2	–	1
Wesleyan		–		7	–	3	–	0
Western Penn.		–		5	–	2	–	1
Brown		–		6	–	4	–	0
Carlisle		–		6	–	4	–	0
Penn State		–		6	–	4	–	0
Pittsburgh College		–		6	–	4	–	1
Army		–		3	–	2	–	1
Vermont		–		3	–	2	–	1
Holy Cross		–		5	–	4	–	1
Bucknell		–		4	–	4	–	3
Fordham		–		1	–	1	–	2
Franklin & Marshall		–		4	–	4	–	2
New Hampshire		–		4	–	4	–	0
Villanova		–		2	–	4	–	1
Lehigh		–		3	–	6	–	1
Boston College		–		2	–	5	–	1
Colgate		–		2	–	5	–	1
Temple		–		2	–	5	–	0
Lafayette		–		3	–	8	–	0
NYU		–		1	–	3	–	0
Rutgers		–		1	–	6	–	1
Tufts		–		1	–	9	–	0
Geneva		–		0	–	6	–	1

The 1898 Princeton Tigers football team was an American football team that represented Princeton University as an independent during the 1898 college football season. The team compiled an 11–0–1 record, shut out 11 of 12 opponents, and outscored all opponents by a total of 266 to 5. Art Hillebrand was the team captain. There was no coach.

There was no contemporaneous system in 1898 for determining a national champion. However, Princeton was retroactively named as the national champion by one selector, Parke H. Davis, a Princeton alumnus. Harvard finished with an 11–0 record and was named as the national champion by the Billingsley Report, Helms Athletic Foundation, Houlgate System, and National Championship Foundation.

Two Princeton players were selected as consensus first-team players on the 1898 All-America team: end Lew Palmer and tackle Art Hillebrand. Hillebrand was later inducted into the College Football Hall of Fame. Other notable players included end Art Poe and guard Big Bill Edwards.

== Schedule ==
Date	Opponent	Site	Result	Attendance	Source
October 1	Lehigh	Princeton, NJ	W 21–0		
October 5	Stevens	Princeton, NJ	W 42–0	1,000	
October 8	Franklin & Marshall	Princeton, NJ	W 58–0		
October 12	Lafayette	Princeton, NJ	W 34–0	2,000	
October 14	at Maryland Athletic Club	Baltimore, MD	W 24–0		
October 15	at Navy	Worden Field; Annapolis, MD	W 30–0		
October 22	Cornell	Princeton, NJ	W 6–0		
October 26	Penn State	Princeton, NJ	W 5–0		
October 29	at Brown	Adelaide Park; Providence, RI	W 23–0	1,500–2,500	
November 2	Virginia	Princeton, NJ	W 12–0		
November 5	at Army	The Plain; West Point, NY	T 5–5	5,000	
November 12	Yale	Brokaw Field; Princeton, NJ (rivalry)	W 6–0	16,500	
