= 1898 Bucknell football team =

American college football season

1898 Bucknell football
- Conference: Independent
- Record: 4–4–3
- Head coach: George Jennings (2nd season)
- Captain: Emmanuel Cober

1898 Eastern college football independents records
	Conf.			Overall
Team	W	L	T	W		L		T
Harvard		–		11	–	0	–	0
Drexel		–		7	–	0	–	0
Princeton		–		11	–	0	–	1
Penn		–		12	–	1	–	0
Buffalo		–		8	–	1	–	0
Cornell		–		10	–	2	–	0
Swarthmore		–		9	–	2	–	0
Washington & Jefferson		–		9	–	2	–	0
Yale		–		9	–	2	–	0
Dickinson		–		8	–	2	–	0
Syracuse		–		8	–	2	–	1
Wesleyan		–		7	–	3	–	0
Western Penn.		–		5	–	2	–	1
Brown		–		6	–	4	–	0
Carlisle		–		6	–	4	–	0
Penn State		–		6	–	4	–	0
Pittsburgh College		–		6	–	4	–	1
Army		–		3	–	2	–	1
Vermont		–		3	–	2	–	1
Holy Cross		–		5	–	4	–	1
Bucknell		–		4	–	4	–	3
Fordham		–		1	–	1	–	2
Franklin & Marshall		–		4	–	4	–	2
New Hampshire		–		4	–	4	–	0
Amherst		–		4	–	5	–	1
Villanova		–		2	–	4	–	1
Lehigh		–		3	–	6	–	1
Boston College		–		2	–	5	–	1
Colgate		–		2	–	5	–	1
Temple		–		2	–	5	–	0
Lafayette		–		3	–	8	–	0
NYU		–		1	–	3	–	0
Rutgers		–		1	–	6	–	1
Tufts		–		1	–	9	–	0
Geneva		–		0	–	6	–	1

The 1898 Bucknell football team was an American football team that represented Bucknell University as an independent during the 1898 college football season. Led by George Jennings in his second and final season as head coach, Bucknell compiled a record of 4–4–3. Emmanuel Cober was the team captain.

== Schedule ==
Date	Time	Opponent	Site	Result	Attendance	Source
September 24		Wyoming Seminary	Bucknell campus; Lewisburg, PA	W 6–0		
October 1	3:30 p.m.	at Company C, National Guard	Washington Park; Bradford, PA	T 0–0	1,000	
October 8	3:00 p.m.	at Navy	Worden Field; Annapolis, MD	L 0–11		
October 15	3:15 p.m.	vs. University of Maryland, Baltimore	Indian Park; Shamokin, PA	W 6–0		
October 22	2:30 p.m.	Swarthmore	Bucknell campus; Lewisburg, PA	W 34–18		
October 29	2:30 p.m.	at Lehigh	Bethlehem, PA	T 0–0		
November 5		vs. Penn State	Williamsport, PA	L 0–16	5,000	
November 8		at Maryland Athletic Club	Maryland Oval; Baltimore, MD	W 6–5		
November 12	3:00 p.m.	vs. Franklin & Marshall	Reading, PA	T 11–11		
November 19	2:00 p.m.	at Lafayette	Easton, PA	L 0–6		
November 24	3:30 p.m.	at Buffalo	Olympic Park; Buffalo, NY	L 5–36		
