= D. Leroy Reeves =

American football player and coach (1872–1949)

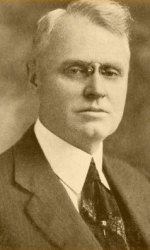

Biographical details
- Born: May 27, 1872; Cape May, New Jersey, U.S.
- Died: August 12, 1949 (aged 77); Cape May, New Jersey, U.S.

Playing career

Baseball
- ?–1896: Lafayette

Football
- ?–1896: Lafayette
- Positions: Outfielder, quarterback

Coaching career (HC unless noted)
- 1898: Drexel

Head coaching record
- Overall: 7–0

David Leroy Reeves (May 27, 1872 – August 12, 1949) was an American college football player and coach. He served as the first head football coach at Drexel Institute—now known as Drexel University—where he accomplished an undefeated season in which the team did not allow any points to opponents.

== Career ==
After graduating from Lafayette College in 1896, Reeves became the first head football coach at Drexel Institute. In his first season in 1898, the team went undefeated, finishing with a 7–0 record, and did not allow any points against the entire season.

After serving as Drexel's football coach, Reeves worked for The Times.

In 1904, Reeves was elected secretary and treasurer of the Philadelphia Phillies, and remained in the position until January 25, 1909. From 1913 through 1916, Reeves served as the National League secretary under John K. Tener. Following his MLB career, Reeves returned to the Philadelphia Public Ledger as the sports editor.

In 1921, Reeves resigned from his position at the Ledger to return to Lafayette as the graduate manager of athletics. Reeves was inducted into the Lafayette Maroon Club Hall of Fame in 1978 for his service as an Athletic Administrator from 1921 through 1946.

== Head coaching record ==
Year	Team	Overall	Conference	Standing	Bowl/playoffs
Drexel (Independent) (1898–unknown)
1898	Drexel	7–0			
Drexel:		7–0			
Total:		7–0			
