= 1898 Drexel Dragons football team =

American college football season

1898 Drexel Dragons football
- Conference: Independent
- Record: 7–0
- Head coach: D. Leroy Reeves (1st season)
- Captain: Charles Carson
- Home stadium: West Philadelphia YMCA

The 1898 Drexel Dragons football team was head coached by D. Leroy Reeves. The team went undefeated, and allowed 0 points against the entire season.

1898 Eastern college football independents records
	Conf.			Overall
Team	W	L	T	W		L		T
Harvard		–		11	–	0	–	0
Drexel		–		7	–	0	–	0
Princeton		–		11	–	0	–	1
Penn		–		12	–	1	–	0
Buffalo		–		8	–	1	–	0
Cornell		–		10	–	2	–	0
Swarthmore		–		9	–	2	–	0
Washington & Jefferson		–		9	–	2	–	0
Yale		–		9	–	2	–	0
Dickinson		–		8	–	2	–	0
Syracuse		–		8	–	2	–	1
Wesleyan		–		7	–	3	–	0
Western Penn.		–		5	–	2	–	1
Brown		–		6	–	4	–	0
Carlisle		–		6	–	4	–	0
Penn State		–		6	–	4	–	0
Pittsburgh College		–		6	–	4	–	1
Army		–		3	–	2	–	1
Vermont		–		3	–	2	–	1
Holy Cross		–		5	–	4	–	1
Bucknell		–		4	–	4	–	3
Fordham		–		1	–	1	–	2
Franklin & Marshall		–		4	–	4	–	2
New Hampshire		–		4	–	4	–	0
Amherst		–		4	–	5	–	1
Villanova		–		2	–	4	–	1
Lehigh		–		3	–	6	–	1
Boston College		–		2	–	5	–	1
Colgate		–		2	–	5	–	1
Temple		–		2	–	5	–	0
Lafayette		–		3	–	8	–	0
NYU		–		1	–	3	–	0
Rutgers		–		1	–	6	–	1
Tufts		–		1	–	9	–	0
Geneva		–		0	–	6	–	1

== Schedule ==
Date	Time	Opponent	Site	Result
October 5		at Cheltenham High School	Ashmead Village, PA	W 59–0
October 13		at Wilmington High School (DE)	Warren Athletic Club; Wilmington, DE	W 6–0
November 1		at Northeast Manual Training School	Belmont	W 33–0
November 3	Morning	at South Jersey Institute	Bridgeton, NJ	W 24–0
November 3	2:00 pm	at West Jersey Academy	Bridgeton, NJ	W 17–0
November 8		Central Manual Training School	West Philadelphia YMCA; Philadelphia, PA	W 15–0
November 18		Roman Catholic High School		Cancelled (Rain)
November 22	3:30 pm	at Ursinus B Team	Collegeville, PA	W 16–0

== Roster ==
1898 Drexel Dragons football team roster
Players
Coaches
Offense

Pos.	#	Name	Class
TE		Bishop
OT		Edwin Potts	So
G		Fosh
C		Coates
RG		Hilliard
OT		Brown
TE		Stoll
QB		Charles Carson (C)	So
HB		Schofield	So
HB		Whitner
FB		Bailey

Defense

Pos.	#	Name	Class

Special teams

Pos.	#	Name	Class

Head coach

- D. Leroy Reeves (Lafayette)

Coordinators/assistant coaches

Legend

- (C) Team captain
- (S) Suspended
- (I) Ineligible
- Injured
- Redshirt

Roster
Last update: 12 February 2018
