= 1898 Amherst football team =

American college football season

1898 Amherst football
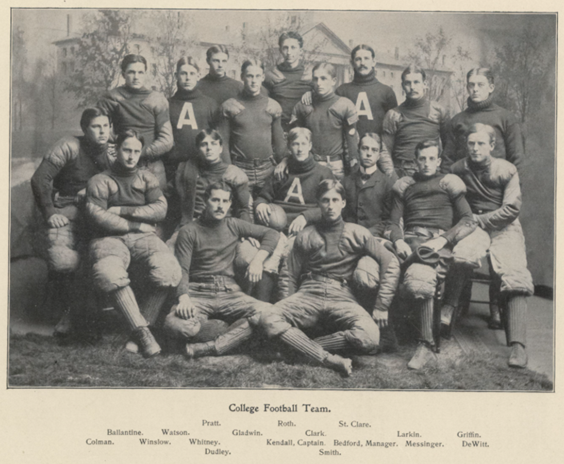
- Conference: Triangular Football League
- Record: 4–5–1 (1–1 TFL)
- Head coach: None
- Captain: Henry P. Kendall
- Home stadium: Pratt Field

1898 Triangular Football League standings
	Conf.					Overall
Team	W		L		T	W		L		T
Dartmouth $	2	–	0	–	0	5	–	6	–	0
Amherst	1	–	1	–	0	4	–	5	–	1
Williams	0	–	2	–	0	3	–	8	–	0
$ – Conference champion

The 1898 Amherst football team represented Amherst College as a member of the Triangular Football League during the 1898 college football season. Amherst compiled an overall record of 4–5–1 with a mark of 1–1 in conference play, placing second in the TFL. The team played home games at Pratt Field in Amherst, Massachusetts.

== Schedule ==
Date	Time	Opponent	Site	Result	Attendance	Source
October 1		Williston Seminary*	Pratt Field; Amherst, MA	W 28–0		
October 5		at Yale*	Yale Field; New Haven, CT	L 0–34		
October 8		Massachusetts*	Pratt Field; Amherst, MA	T 0–0		
October 12	4:00 p.m.	at Harvard*	Soldiers' Field; Boston, MA	L 2–53		
October 15		at Wesleyan*	Middletown, CT	L 0–33		
October 22		Trinity (CT)*	Pratt Field; Amherst, MA	W 12–0		
October 26		Wesleyan*	Pratt Field; Amherst, MA	L 0–28		
October 29		Boston Tech*	Pratt Field; Amherst, MA	W 10–6		
November 5		Dartmouth	Pratt Field; Amherst, MA	L 6–64	1,000	
November 19		at Williams	Weston Field; Williamstown, MA (rivalry)	W 16–5		
*Non-conference game
