= Maurice Connor (American football) =

American football coach (1872–1939)

Biographical details
- Born: September 1, 1872; Manchester, New Hampshire, U.S.
- Died: March 22, 1939 (aged 66); Omaha, Nebraska, U.S.
- Education: Harvard; Northwestern University School of Law

Coaching career (HC unless noted)
- 1895: Phillips Exeter (NH)
- 1898–1902: Holy Cross
- 1903: Bowdoin (assistant)
- 1904: Phillips Exeter (NH) (assistant)
- 1905: Northwestern (assistant)
- 1908: Northwestern (assistant)

Head coaching record
- Overall: 27–15–4 (college)

Maurice James Connor (September 1, 1872 – March 22, 1939) was an American football coach, state legislator, and attorney. He served as the head football coach at the College of the Holy Cross in Worcester, Massachusetts from 1898 to 1902. He later served three terms in the New Hampshire House of Representatives and practiced law in Iowa and Nebraska.

== Early life ==
Connor was born to Michael and Bridget (Scannell) Connor on September 1, 1872 in Manchester, New Hampshire. He graduated from Phillips Exeter Academy and Harvard College.

== Football ==
In 1895, Connor was the head football coach at Phillips Exeter. He served as the head football coach at Holy Cross from 1898 to 1902, where he compiled a 27–15–4 record. He was an assistant coach at Bowdoin College in 1903 and assisted Fred W. Murphy at Phillips Exeter in 1904. In 1905, he became an assistant to Walter McCornack at Northwestern University. The school did not field a team in 1906 or 1907, but when the program returned in 1908, he was an assistant under Alton Johnson.

== Professional career ==
After graduating from Harvard, Connor returned to Manchester and joined his father in business. Connor earned his law degree at Northwestern and practiced law in Des Moines, Iowa for seven years. He returned to Manchester and served three terms in the New Hampshire House of Representatives, where he gained a reputation for using the filibuster and was popular with members of both parties. Although a member of the Democratic Party, Connor was critical of Democratic Governor Samuel D. Felker. In 1921, Connor moved to Omaha, Nebraska, where he practiced law until his death on March 22, 1939.
