= 1899 college football rankings =

- Season: 1899
- Bowl season: 1899–00 bowl games

The 1899 college football season rankings included a ranking by New York City newspaper The Sun.

== The Sun ==
In December 1899, New York City newspaper The Sun published a column detailing "how the leading elevens are impartially rated."

=== Eastern teams ===
The Sun's top-seven list contained only Eastern teams, without stating that specifically.

Rank	Team	Record
1	Harvard	10–0–1
2	Princeton	12–1
3	Lafayette	12–1
4	Carlisle	9–2
5	Penn	8–3–2
6	Cornell	7–3
7	Columbia	9–3

=== Western teams ===
The column in The Sun also separately ranked the top two teams in the West.

Rank	Team	Record
1	Chicago	16–0–2
2	Wisconsin	9–2

== See also ==
- 1899 College Football All-America Team
