= Joseph Stannard (American football) =

American football player, coach, and dentist (1872–1952)

Biographical details
- Born: February 6, 1872; Linneus, Missouri, U.S.
- Died: February 22, 1952 (aged 80); Bloomington, Illinois, U.S.

Playing career
- c. 1894: Colgate
- 1896: Penn

Coaching career (HC unless noted)
- 1897: Westminster (PA)
- 1899: Colgate

Head coaching record
- Overall: 5–12–2

Joseph Byron Stannard (February 6, 1872 – February 22, 1952) was an American college football player and coach and dentist. He served as the head football coach at Westminster College in New Wilmington, Pennsylvania in 1897 and Colgate University in 1899. Before coaching, Stannard played football first at Colgate under Spencer Ford and then at the University of Pennsylvania under George Washington Woodruff.

Stannard was born on February 6, 1872, in Linneus, Missouri, to Oscar and Francis Stannard. He graduated from the University of Pennsylvania School of Dental Medicine and began practicing dentistry in Bloomington, Illinois in 1903. Stannard died on February 22, 1952, at St. Joseph Hospital in Bloomington, after a two-week illness.

== Head coaching record ==
| Year | Team | Overall | Conference | Standing | Bowl/playoffs |
|---|---|---|---|---|---|
Westminster Titans (Independent) (1897)
| 1897 | Westminster | 1–7–2 | | | |
| Westminster: | | 1–7–2 | | | |
Colgate (Independent) (1899)
| 1899 | Colgate | 4–5 | | | |
| Colgate: | | 4–5 | | | |
| Total: | | 5–12–2 | | | |
