= 1899 Western University of Pennsylvania football team =

American college football season

1899 Western University of Pennsylvania football
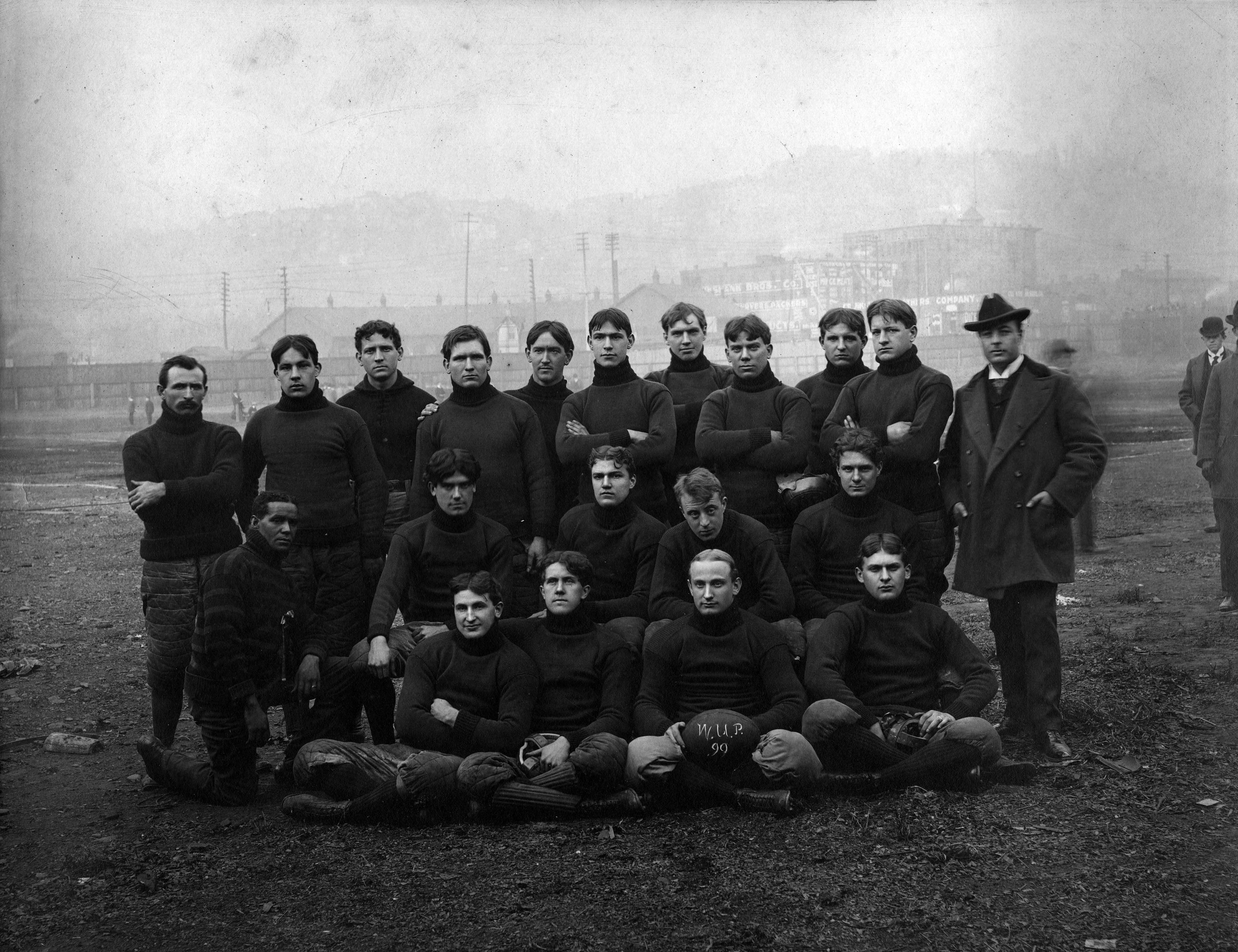
- Conference: Independent
- Record: 3–2
- Head coach: Frederick A. Robison (2nd season)
- Home stadium: Recreation Park

1899 Eastern college football independents records
	Conf.			Overall
Team	W	L	T	W		L		T
Harvard		–		10	–	0	–	1
Lafayette		–		12	–	1	–	0
Princeton		–		12	–	1	–	0
Buffalo		–		7	–	1	–	0
Boston College		–		8	–	1	–	1
Carlisle		–		9	–	2	–	0
Swarthmore		–		8	–	1	–	2
Washington & Jefferson		–		9	–	2	–	1
Wesleyan		–		7	–	2	–	0
Pittsburgh College		–		2	–	0	–	2
Villanova		–		7	–	2	–	1
Yale		–		7	–	2	–	1
Western Univ. of Penn.		–		3	–	1	–	1
Columbia		–		9	–	3	–	0
Fordham		–		3	–	1	–	0
Cornell		–		7	–	3	–	0
Penn		–		8	–	3	–	2
Brown		–		7	–	3	–	1
New Hampshire		–		4	–	2	–	0
Vermont		–		5	–	3	–	0
Tufts		–		7	–	4	–	0
Bucknell		–		6	–	4	–	0
Dickinson		–		6	–	6	–	1
Holy Cross		–		5	–	5	–	0
Syracuse		–		4	–	4	–	0
Drexel		–		3	–	3	–	0
Army		–		4	–	5	–	0
Colgate		–		4	–	5	–	0
Penn State		–		4	–	6	–	1
Franklin & Marshall		–		3	–	5	–	1
NYU		–		2	–	6	–	0
Temple		–		1	–	4	–	1
Dartmouth		–		2	–	7	–	0
Lehigh		–		2	–	9	–	0
Rutgers		–		2	–	9	–	0
Geneva		–		0	–	3	–	0

The 1899 Western University of Pennsylvania football team was an American football team that represented Western University of Pennsylvania (now known as the University of Pittsburgh) as an independent during the 1899 college football season.

== Schedule ==
Date	Opponent	Site	Result	Attendance	Source
October 25	Westminster (PA)	Recreation Park; Pittsburgh, PA	L 0–6 (forfeit)	900	
November 3	Grove City	Recreation Park; Pittsburgh, PA	W 16–0		
November 10	Swissvale Athletic Club	Recreation Park; Pittsburgh, PA	W 11–0		
November 15	Bethany (WV)	Recreation Park; Pittsburgh, PA	W 5–0	1,000	
November 18	J. F. Lalus Athletic Club	P.A.C. Grounds; Pittsburgh, PA	L 0–12	1,500	
November 22	Waynesburg	Waynesburg, Pa.	game cancelled		
November 30	Acme	Steubenville, Ohio	game cancelled		

== Season recap ==
After the successful 1898 season, the Western University of Pennsylvania (WUP) retained Frederick A. Robison as coach/captain for the 1899 season. The Western University Courant gave the best summation of the 1899 season and state of football at the university:

"The position in the football world taken by our team this fall is one of which we may well be proud. Among Western Pennsylvania college teams, our colors are at the front. Not every college team was met, but a sufficient number of games were played to clearly define the position of W. U. P. Westminster, who were falling so easily before the onslaughts of the Old Gold and Blue when they struck their colors and crawled into their bus, holds the championship of the inter-collegiate league. Bethany, from the South, returned home without either her "ringers" or a victory; and Bethany stands high in the Southern part of the State in West Virginia. The fact that the team was purely a college team demonstrates that which has been claimed for some time; namely, that a purely college team can place the University at the top among similar amateur teams. The first attempt in this direction was not altogether a success, the second was an improvement over the first, and the third has placed W. U. P. in the position that the famous team of '92 held, in the days when "ringers" were not required nor desired. The difficulties against which the team was obliged to strive are well known. The opening of the University so late in the Fall made it impossible to get started until the season was more than well opened. Thus W. U. P. had to develop her team after the others had begun to play their games. Then the inconveniences connected with the grounds and practice were many. The grounds are a mile from the nearest department and three or four miles from the farthest. Thus much valuable time was wasted in going to and from practice. And, of course, schedules interfered. Then, too, the dressing-room was inadequate. It is a wonder the men turned out at all, having no better accommodations at the grounds than they did. But in spite of all obstacles they worked faithfully and brought out what was unquestionably the best team that has represented W. U. P. for several years. he spirit displayed by the students who attended the games was very creditable; but the size of the attendance was much otherwise. The voluntary contributions of the students do not amount to such a large sum that the gate receipts are not needed by the management. It is a fact that the manager is personally out of pocket., on account of nothing else than a lack of attendance at the games by the students. Any student who is not ashamed of this fact is unworthy to wear a W. U. P. pennant. There has been a great deal of complaint about the unsatisfactory condition of athletics in the University. Now we have had two successful football seasons, and the second has been unsuccessful financially on account of lack of interest by the students. It seems as though the time has arrived for these unsatisfied mourners to do what is considered a privilege - to attend the contests, and display a little, even a very little enthusiasm, unless they desire to have the privilege withdrawn."

In its second and final season under head coach Frederick A. Robison, the team compiled a 3–2 record and outscored opponents by a total of 43 to 23.

== Game summaries ==
=== Westminster (PA) ===
Westminster at WUP

Team	1	2	Total
• Westminster	0	6	6
WUP	0	0	0

- Date: October 25, 1899
- Location: Recreation Park, Pittsburgh
- Game attendance: 900
- Referee: John Cameron

On October 25 the Westminster College eleven rolled into town to take on the WUP at Recreation Park. The WUP kicked off and Westminster's halfback Cummings scored five minutes into the first half. Kuhn kicked the goal after and Westminster was ahead 6–0. The WUP defense played better after the next kickoff. Westminster fumbled on one possession and lost the ball on downs on another. However, the WUP offense could not move the ball on either series and Westminster regained possession. Westminster's offense worked the ball downfield and their halfback Edmondson was able to skirt around the end for 15 yards and another touchdown for the lads from New Wilmington. The goal kick after failed and the halftime score read 11–0 in favor of Westminster.

Coach Robison gave a great halftime pep talk. The Western U. received the kickoff and Cullers returned the ball to near midfield. On the first scrimmage play, Robison carried the pigskin 45 yards into the end zone. Sterrett missed the goal kick after. Westminster kicked off again and Jones returned the ball to the 40-yard line. WUP fullback Sterrett broke through the defense and raced seventy yards for the second touchdown. Sterrett was successful on the goal kick after and the score was tied, 11–11. The WUP offense was advancing the ball into Westminster territory again when John Cameron, the Westminster appointed official, called a penalty on the WUP. Coach Robison was upset because the referee made a call that was the responsibility of the umpire. Westminster refused to appoint a different official or change the call. Coach Robison and the Western U. team went home and the game was a 6–0 forfeit to Westminster. The Pitt record book lists the score 11–11.

The WUP lineup for the game against Westminster was Chester Fisher (left end), Newell (left tackle), William Mitchell (left guard), James Chessrown (center), King (right guard), George Dale (right tackle), Victor King (right end), William Cullers (quarterback), Wesley Jones (left halfback), Fred Robison (right halfback), and William Sterrett (fullback).

=== Grove City ===
Grove City at WUP

Team	1	2	Total
Grove City	0	0	0
• WUP	11	5	16

- Date: November 3, 1899
- Location: Recreation Park, Pittsburgh
- Referee: W. D. Hockensmith

On a rainy November 3, the Grove City College eleven came to Recreation Park and took on the WUP. The field was covered in mud and some two-inch deep puddles of water. Grove City kicked off and on the first play from scrimmage Robison scampered 75 yards for a touchdown. Sterrett was successful on the goal kick after. Grove City kicked off again and the WUP offense steadily advanced the ball down the field and Weber ultimately took it into the end zone from one yard out. Sterrett's kick after failed. Grove City recovered a WUP fumble but could not move the ball offensively and punted the ball back to the WUP offense. The first half then came to an end with the score 11–0 in favor of WUP.

The rain intensified in the second half and made play even more difficult. The Grove City eleven was unable to generate any offense, but the WUP offense managed to score one more touchdown late in the half on a Robison two-yard plunge to make the final score 16–0.

The WUP lineup for the game against Grove City was Chester Fisher (left end), William Mitchell (left tackle), Walter Stifel (left guard), James Chessrown (center), Weber (right guard), Malcolm McConnell (right tackle), Victor King (right end), William Cullers (quarterback), John Crooks (left halfback), Fred Robison (right halfback), and William Sterrett (fullback). Substitutions for the second half were : John Martin for William Mitchell at left tackle, William Mitchell for Malcolm McConnell at right tackle and Emmett Bates for Victor King at right end.

=== Swissvale Athletic Club ===
Swissvale A. C. at WUP

Team	1	2	Total
Swissvale	0	0	0
• WUP	0	11	11

- Date: November 10, 1899
- Location: Recreation Park, Pittsburgh
- Referee: Ed Young (D. C. & A. C.)

Manager Edward A. Grau was able to get the Recreation Park field in playable condition for the November 10 match-up with the Swissvale Athletic Club eleven. Swissvale took the opening kick and marched steadily to the WUP 22-yard line. The WUP defense stiffened and took over on downs. Robison, Crooks and Mitchell of the Western eleven were able to advance the ball to the 15-yard line of Swissvale. Robison fumbled on the next play and Swissvale recovered. Swissvale punted and the WUP offense again advanced the ball steadily but time ran out in the first half with the ball at midfield and the score 0–0.

The WUP offense received the second-half kickoff and proceeded to move the ball into Swissvale territory. From the 12-yard line Robison tried an end run but was pushed out of bounds at the nine. Two plays later Weber was shoved over for the touchdown. Sterrett was successful on the goal kick after and the score was 6–0 in favor of Western U. Swissvale again kicked off and the WUP offense began another steady march down the field. When the WUP offense reached Swissvale's four-yard line, a slugfest broke out between WUPs' Bates and McKeever of Swissvale. Bates was ejected and play resumed. Sterrett promptly scored from the four and then missed the goal after. Both defenses played better for the next few possessions until darkness caused the game to be suspended a few minutes early. The final score read WUP 11 – Swissvale 0.

The WUP lineup for the game against Swissvale A. C. was Chester Fisher (left end), William Mitchell (left tackle), Walter Stifel (left guard), Parke Bachman (center), Weber (right guard), John Martin (right tackle), Victor King (right end), William Cullers (quarterback), John Crooks (left halfback), Fred Robison (right halfback), and William Sterrett (fullback). Emmett Bates replaced Chester Fisher at left end for the second half and was disqualified for slugging. He was replaced by Wesley Jones. James Chessrown replaced Parke Bachman at center and Malcolm McConnell replaced John Crooks at left halfback.

=== Bethany (WV) ===
Bethany at WUP

Team	1	2	Total
Bethany	0	0	0
• WUP	0	5	5

- Date: November 15, 1899
- Location: Recreation Park, Pittsburgh
- Game attendance: 1,000
- Referee: W. D. Hockensmith

When the Bethany College eleven came to Pittsburgh on November 15, they were greeted to a muddy Recreation Park field for their match with the WUP. The Pittsburg Post noted that the visitors had some "ringers" in their line-up: "Bethany came here loaded, having Sweeney, McCutcheon, Core, and Duffy in their line-up". Close to a thousand spectators were present for the game and they were treated to a fierce struggle. The first half was a scoreless defensive battle. The WUP offense twice was able to advance the ball near the goal line, but the visiting defense then held on downs. The Bethany offense was unable to advance the ball and punted it back to midfield. Near the end of the first half, Sweeney of Bethany slugged the WUP quarterback Cullers and was ejected from the game. The second half produced more drama. After the WUP offense again drove the ball down the field near the Bethany goal line, McConnell, WUP halfback, scored a touchdown. As he crossed the line, he either dropped the ball or it was knocked from his grasp. Bethany disputed the touchdown call, claiming it was a fumble. The referee did not change his mind and Bethany headed for the train back to West Virginia. Coach Robison told the referee to change the call and the game continued. The ball was put in play at the 25-yard line and the Bethany offense was ineffective so they punted. The WUP offense methodically marched down the field and McConnell carried the ball into the end zone for a touchdown. Sterrett missed the goal kick after making the score WUP 5 – Bethany 0. Bethany kicked to the Universities and again the offensive play of the WUP eleven kept the Bethany defense on its heels. As time ran out, the WUP had the ball on the Bethany two-yard line.

The WUP lineup for the game against Bethany was Emmett Bates (left end), William Mitchell (left tackle), Walter Stifel (left guard), James Chessrown (center), Weber (right guard), John Martin (right tackle), Victor King (right end), William Cullers (quarterback), Malcolm McConnell (left halfback), Fred Robison (right halfback), and William Sterrett (fullback).

=== At J. F. Lalus ===
WUP at J. F. Lalus

Team	1	2	Total
WUP	0	0	0
• J. F. Lalus	6	6	12

- Date: November 18, 1899
- Location: Recreation Park, Pittsburgh
- Game attendance: 1,500
- Referee: Jimmy Rodgers

Three days later the WUP eleven squared off against the undefeated and unscores upon J. F. Lalus Athletic Club team on the muddy Pittsburgh Athletic Club grounds. Fifteen hundred fans braved the November weather and enjoyed an entertaining game. The WUP received the opening kick and their offense behind the running of Robison and Weber advanced the ball into Lalus territory. The Lalus defense stiffened and took over on downs. Lalus backs McChesney, Nagle and Willis worked the ball to the WUP 15-yard line. On third down, Horne scored a touchdown and McChesney kicked the goal after for a 6–0 lead for Lalus. WUP kicked off and Nagle gained 30 yards. On first down Horne gained 40 yards and fumbled but Lalus recovered. Lalus was offside on the next play and the WUP offense took over. They were able to move the ball to the Lalus 10-yard line, but WUP quarterback McConnell fumbled and E. Willis of Lalus recovered. The first half ended with Lalus at midfield. Lalas received the second half kickoff and proceeded to march down the field. The WUP defense could not stop the running of Horne, Loeffler, E. Wilson, Nagle and J. Willis. Horne finally scored from the two-yard line and McChesney was again successful on the goal after to make the score 12–0 in favor of Lalus. After the kickoff the WUP defense dug in and stopped the Lalus offense on downs. The WUP offense advanced the ball but then turned the ball over on downs. The Lalus offense was unable to generate a drive and the WUP offense regained possession. The WUP backs carried the ball to the Lalus 10-yard line. On the next play, Robison fumbled and McChesney fell on the ball for Lalus. On first down J. Willis raced 40 yards to get Lalus near midfield and time ran out a few plays later with Lalus on the WUP 11-yard line.

The WUP lineup for the game against J. F. Lalus was Chester Fisher (left end), William Mitchell (left tackle), Walter Stifel (left guard), Parke Bachman (center), Weber (right guard), John Martin (right tackle), Victor King (right end), Malcolm McConnell (quarterback), Fred Robison (left halfback), John Crooks (right halfback), and William Sterrett (fullback). James Chessrown replaced Parke Bachman at center.

=== At Waynesburg ===
The next game was scheduled four days later against the Waynesburg College eleven on November 22. The WUP claimed that four of their best players were injured and they would have to cancel the trip.

=== At Acme ===
The final game was scheduled for Thanksgiving Day against the Acmes of Steubenville, Ohio. But manager Grau had to cancel again due to lack of interest by the players.

== Roster ==
The roster of the 1899 Western University of Pennsylvania football team:

- Dr. John W. Crooks (halfback) received his Doctor of Medicine degree in 1900 and resided in Seattle, Washington.
- William H. Cullers (quarterback) received his Civil Engineering degree in 1901 and became Chief Engineer of the Northwest Steel Company in Portland, Oregon.
- Parke R. Bachman (tackle) earned his Associate Engineering degree in 1901. He became the Superintendent of the Sharon Steel Hoop Company in Sharon, Pa.
- Dr. Wesley W. Jones (halfback) received his Doctor of Medicine degree in 1901 and resided in Wilkinsburg, Pa.
- Chester G. Fisher (end) received his degree in Mechanical Engineering in 1900 and resided in Pittsburgh, Pa. He was the President of the Scientific Materials Company of Pittsburgh.
- Dr. Victor King (end) received his Doctor of Medicine degree in 1901 and resided in Pittsburgh, Pa.
- Emmett C. Bates (end) received his associate degree from the college in 1899 and earned an associate degree in the Evening School of Economics in 1912.
- William H. Mitchell (guard) earned his Mechanical Engineering degree in 1901. He became an Inspector for the Niagara Falls Power Company and Canadian Niagara Power Company. He resided in Niagara Falls, N.Y.
- Dr. William J. Sterrett (fullback) received his Doctor of Medicine degree in 1901 and resided in East Pittsburgh, Pa.
- Malcolm F. McConnell (tackle) received his degree in Mechanical Engineering in 1902 and became Superintendent of the Mingo Junction Works of the Carnegie Steel Company in Steubenville, Ohio.
- Dr. James H. Chessrown (center) received his Doctor of Dental Surgery degree in 1901 and resided in Youngstown, Ohio. He was one of the original Presidents of the Youngstown Pitt Club.
- Dr. John L. Martin (tackle) received his Doctor of Medicine degree in 1903 and resided in Pittsburgh, Pa.
- Dr. Arthur A. Parks (substitute) received his Doctor of Medicine degree in 1901 and resided in Fredonia, Pa.
- Dr. John A. Boyd (substitute) earned his Doctor of Medicine degree in 1903 and resided in Pittsburgh, Pa.
- Walter H. Stifel (guard) earned his associate degree from the college in 1901 and became Superintendent of the Charles F. Stifel Company, Tanners in Pittsburgh, Pa.
- George C. Dale (substitute) earned his Doctor of Dental Surgery degree in 1900. He resided in Grove City, Pa.
- Weber (guard)
- King (guard)
- Newell

== Coaching staff ==
- Dr. Frederick A. Robison (coach/captain) – received his Doctor of Dental Surgery degree in 1900 and resided in State College.
- Edward A Grau (manager) was in the Dental School, but ended up in automobile sales.
