= 1899 Washington & Jefferson football team =

American college football season

1899 Washington & Jefferson football
- Conference: Independent
- Record: 9–2–1
- Head coach: S. W. Black (1st season)
- Captain: Karl Core
- Home stadium: College Park

1899 Eastern college football independents records
| | Conf. | | | Overall |
| Team | W | L | T | W | | L | | T |
|---|---|---|---|---|---|---|---|---|
| Harvard | | – | | 10 | – | 0 | – | 1 |
| Lafayette | | – | | 12 | – | 1 | – | 0 |
| Princeton | | – | | 12 | – | 1 | – | 0 |
| Buffalo | | – | | 7 | – | 1 | – | 0 |
| Boston College | | – | | 8 | – | 1 | – | 1 |
| Carlisle | | – | | 9 | – | 2 | – | 0 |
| Swarthmore | | – | | 8 | – | 1 | – | 2 |
| Washington & Jefferson | | – | | 9 | – | 2 | – | 1 |
| Wesleyan | | – | | 7 | – | 2 | – | 0 |
| Pittsburgh College | | – | | 2 | – | 0 | – | 2 |
| Villanova | | – | | 7 | – | 2 | – | 1 |
| Yale | | – | | 7 | – | 2 | – | 1 |
| Western Univ. of Penn. | | – | | 3 | – | 1 | – | 1 |
| Columbia | | – | | 9 | – | 3 | – | 0 |
| Fordham | | – | | 3 | – | 1 | – | 0 |
| Cornell | | – | | 7 | – | 3 | – | 0 |
| Penn | | – | | 8 | – | 3 | – | 2 |
| Brown | | – | | 7 | – | 3 | – | 1 |
| New Hampshire | | – | | 4 | – | 2 | – | 0 |
| Vermont | | – | | 5 | – | 3 | – | 0 |
| Tufts | | – | | 7 | – | 4 | – | 0 |
| Bucknell | | – | | 6 | – | 4 | – | 0 |
| Dickinson | | – | | 6 | – | 6 | – | 1 |
| Holy Cross | | – | | 5 | – | 5 | – | 0 |
| Syracuse | | – | | 4 | – | 4 | – | 0 |
| Drexel | | – | | 3 | – | 3 | – | 0 |
| Army | | – | | 4 | – | 5 | – | 0 |
| Colgate | | – | | 4 | – | 5 | – | 0 |
| Penn State | | – | | 4 | – | 6 | – | 1 |
| Franklin & Marshall | | – | | 3 | – | 5 | – | 1 |
| NYU | | – | | 2 | – | 6 | – | 0 |
| Temple | | – | | 1 | – | 4 | – | 1 |
| Dartmouth | | – | | 2 | – | 7 | – | 0 |
| Lehigh | | – | | 2 | – | 9 | – | 0 |
| Rutgers | | – | | 2 | – | 9 | – | 0 |
| Geneva | | – | | 0 | – | 3 | – | 0 |

The 1899 Washington & Jefferson football team was an American football team that represented Washington & Jefferson College as an independent during the 1899 college football season. Led by S. W. Black in his first and only year as head coach, the team compiled a record of 9–2–1.

== Schedule ==
| Date | Time | Opponent | Site | Result | Attendance | Source |
|---|---|---|---|---|---|---|
| September 23 | 3:25–3:30 p.m. | Waynesburg | Washington, PA | W 10–0 | 750–1,000 | |
| September 30 | 3:15 p.m. | Marietta | College Park; Washington, PA | W 12–0 | 800 | |
| October 5 | 4:00 p.m. | California Normal (PA) | College Park; Washington, PA | W 44–0 | | |
| October 7 | | Otterbein | Washington, PA | W 59–0 | 600–700 | |
| October 13 | 3:30 p.m. | at Penn State | Beaver Field; State College, PA | T 0–0 | 1,500–2,000 | |
| October 21 | 3:50 p.m. | West Virginia | College Park; Washington, PA | W 29–0 | 400 | |
| October 28 | | Western Reserve | College Park; Washington, PA | W 6–0 | 600 | |
| November 4 | | Ohio Medical | Washington, PA | W 15–0 | | |
| November 11 | 3:20 p.m. | Cincinnati | College Park; Washington, PA | W 20–0 | | |
| November 18 | 3:00 p.m. | Princeton | Princeton, NJ | L 0–6 | | |
| November 25 | | Westminster (PA) | College Park; Washington, PA | W 48–0 | | |
| November 30 | | at Duquesne Country and Athletic Club | Exposition Park; Pittsburgh, PA | L 0–18 | 15,000–18,000 | |
