= 1899 Geneva Covenanters football team =

American college football season

1899 Geneva Covenanters football
- Conference: Independent
- Record: 0–3–1
- Captains: William T. Levis; A. T. Smith

1899 Eastern college football independents records
| | Conf. | | | Overall |
| Team | W | L | T | W | | L | | T |
|---|---|---|---|---|---|---|---|---|
| Harvard | | – | | 10 | – | 0 | – | 1 |
| Lafayette | | – | | 12 | – | 1 | – | 0 |
| Princeton | | – | | 12 | – | 1 | – | 0 |
| Buffalo | | – | | 7 | – | 1 | – | 0 |
| Boston College | | – | | 8 | – | 1 | – | 1 |
| Carlisle | | – | | 9 | – | 2 | – | 0 |
| Swarthmore | | – | | 8 | – | 1 | – | 2 |
| Washington & Jefferson | | – | | 9 | – | 2 | – | 1 |
| Wesleyan | | – | | 7 | – | 2 | – | 0 |
| Pittsburgh College | | – | | 2 | – | 0 | – | 2 |
| Villanova | | – | | 7 | – | 2 | – | 1 |
| Yale | | – | | 7 | – | 2 | – | 1 |
| Western Univ. of Penn. | | – | | 3 | – | 1 | – | 1 |
| Columbia | | – | | 9 | – | 3 | – | 0 |
| Fordham | | – | | 3 | – | 1 | – | 0 |
| Cornell | | – | | 7 | – | 3 | – | 0 |
| Penn | | – | | 8 | – | 3 | – | 2 |
| Brown | | – | | 7 | – | 3 | – | 1 |
| New Hampshire | | – | | 4 | – | 2 | – | 0 |
| Vermont | | – | | 5 | – | 3 | – | 0 |
| Tufts | | – | | 7 | – | 4 | – | 0 |
| Bucknell | | – | | 6 | – | 4 | – | 0 |
| Dickinson | | – | | 6 | – | 6 | – | 1 |
| Holy Cross | | – | | 5 | – | 5 | – | 0 |
| Syracuse | | – | | 4 | – | 4 | – | 0 |
| Drexel | | – | | 3 | – | 3 | – | 0 |
| Army | | – | | 4 | – | 5 | – | 0 |
| Colgate | | – | | 4 | – | 5 | – | 0 |
| Penn State | | – | | 4 | – | 6 | – | 1 |
| Franklin & Marshall | | – | | 3 | – | 5 | – | 1 |
| NYU | | – | | 2 | – | 6 | – | 0 |
| Temple | | – | | 1 | – | 4 | – | 1 |
| Dartmouth | | – | | 2 | – | 7 | – | 0 |
| Lehigh | | – | | 2 | – | 9 | – | 0 |
| Rutgers | | – | | 2 | – | 9 | – | 0 |
| Geneva | | – | | 0 | – | 3 | – | 0 |

The 1899 Geneva Covenanters football team was an American football team that represented Geneva College as an independent during the 1899 college football season. The team finished with a record of 0–3–1. William T. Levis was made captain in the preseason; A. T. Smith later appeared as captain.

== Schedule ==
| Date | Opponent | Site | Result | Source |
|---|---|---|---|---|
| October 7 | at Thiel | Greenville, PA | L 5–6 | |
| October 14 | at Allegheny | Meadville, PA | L 0–6 | |
| October 21 | at Westminster (PA) | New Wilmington, PA | L 0–60 | |
| October 28 | Lawrenceville Athletic Club | Beaver Falls, PA | T 0–0 (Note: A Geneva touchdown was disallowed by the officials but claimed as valid by the team, which recorded the game as a 6–0 victory.) | |
| November 4 | Westminster (PA) | Beaver Falls, PA | Cancelled | |
