= 1899 Holy Cross football team =

American college football season

1899 Holy Cross football
- Conference: Independent
- Record: 5–5
- Head coach: Maurice Connor (2nd season)
- Captain: John Kenney
- Home stadium: Worcester College Grounds, Worcester Oval

1899 Eastern college football independents records
	Conf.			Overall
Team	W	L	T	W		L		T
Harvard		–		10	–	0	–	1
Lafayette		–		12	–	1	–	0
Princeton		–		12	–	1	–	0
Buffalo		–		7	–	1	–	0
Boston College		–		8	–	1	–	1
Carlisle		–		9	–	2	–	0
Swarthmore		–		8	–	1	–	2
Washington & Jefferson		–		9	–	2	–	1
Wesleyan		–		7	–	2	–	0
Pittsburgh College		–		2	–	0	–	2
Villanova		–		7	–	2	–	1
Yale		–		7	–	2	–	1
Western Univ. of Penn.		–		3	–	1	–	1
Columbia		–		9	–	3	–	0
Fordham		–		3	–	1	–	0
Cornell		–		7	–	3	–	0
Penn		–		8	–	3	–	2
Brown		–		7	–	3	–	1
New Hampshire		–		4	–	2	–	0
Vermont		–		5	–	3	–	0
Tufts		–		7	–	4	–	0
Bucknell		–		6	–	4	–	0
Dickinson		–		6	–	6	–	1
Holy Cross		–		5	–	5	–	0
Syracuse		–		4	–	4	–	0
Drexel		–		3	–	3	–	0
Army		–		4	–	5	–	0
Colgate		–		4	–	5	–	0
Penn State		–		4	–	6	–	1
Franklin & Marshall		–		3	–	5	–	1
NYU		–		2	–	6	–	0
Temple		–		1	–	4	–	1
Dartmouth		–		2	–	7	–	0
Lehigh		–		2	–	9	–	0
Rutgers		–		2	–	9	–	0
Geneva		–		0	–	3	–	0

The 1899 Holy Cross football team was an American football team that represented the College of the Holy Cross as an independent in the 1899 college football season.

In their second year under head coach Maurice Connor, the team compiled a 5–5 record. John Kenney was the team captain.

Holy Cross played its home games at two off-campus fields in Worcester, Massachusetts, the Worcester Oval and the Worcester College Grounds.

== Schedule ==
Date	Opponent	Site	Result	Attendance	Source
September 23	Massachusetts	Worcester College Grounds; Worcester, MA	W 11–0		
September 30	Brown	Worcester College Grounds; Worcester, MA	L 0–19		
October 7	Trinity (CT)	Worcester Oval; Worcester, MA	W 39–0		
October 14	Worcester Tech	Worcester Oval; Worcester, MA	W 23–0		
October 18	at Williams	Weston Field; Williamstown, MA	L 5–23		
October 28	at Fitchburg Y. M. C. L.	Circle Street Field; Fitchburg, MA	W 12–0		
November 4	Tufts	Worcester Oval; Worcester, MA	L 0–6		
November 11	at Wesleyan	Andrus Field; Middletown, CT	L 0–16		
November 25	Vermont	Worcester College Grounds; Worcester, MA	W 45–0		
November 30	at Boston College	South End Grounds; Boston, MA (rivalry)	L 0–17	6,000	
