= 1899 Boston College football team =

American college football season

1899 Boston College football
- Conference: Independent
- Record: 8–1–1
- Head coach: John Dunlop (3rd season)
- Captains: John Kelley; Charlie Kiley
- Home stadium: South End Grounds

1899 Eastern college football independents records
	Conf.			Overall
Team	W	L	T	W		L		T
Harvard		–		10	–	0	–	1
Lafayette		–		12	–	1	–	0
Princeton		–		12	–	1	–	0
Buffalo		–		7	–	1	–	0
Boston College		–		8	–	1	–	1
Carlisle		–		9	–	2	–	0
Swarthmore		–		8	–	1	–	2
Washington & Jefferson		–		9	–	2	–	1
Wesleyan		–		7	–	2	–	0
Pittsburgh College		–		2	–	0	–	2
Villanova		–		7	–	2	–	1
Yale		–		7	–	2	–	1
Western Univ. of Penn.		–		3	–	1	–	1
Columbia		–		9	–	3	–	0
Fordham		–		3	–	1	–	0
Cornell		–		7	–	3	–	0
Penn		–		8	–	3	–	2
Brown		–		7	–	3	–	1
New Hampshire		–		4	–	2	–	0
Vermont		–		5	–	3	–	0
Tufts		–		7	–	4	–	0
Bucknell		–		6	–	4	–	0
Dickinson		–		6	–	6	–	1
Holy Cross		–		5	–	5	–	0
Syracuse		–		4	–	4	–	0
Drexel		–		3	–	3	–	0
Army		–		4	–	5	–	0
Colgate		–		4	–	5	–	0
Penn State		–		4	–	6	–	1
Franklin & Marshall		–		3	–	5	–	1
NYU		–		2	–	6	–	0
Temple		–		1	–	4	–	1
Dartmouth		–		2	–	7	–	0
Lehigh		–		2	–	9	–	0
Rutgers		–		2	–	9	–	0
Geneva		–		0	–	3	–	0

The 1899 Boston College football team was an American football team that represented Boston College as an independent during the 1899 college football season. Led by third-year head coach John Dunlop, Boston College compiled a record of 8–1–1.

== Schedule ==
Date	Opponent	Site	Result	Attendance	Source
September 27	at Exeter Academy	Exeter, NH	W 2–0		
September 30	at Bates	Garcelon Field; Lewiston, ME	T 0–0	500	
October 11	at Boston Tech	Charles River Park; Cambridge, MA	W 24–0		
October 14	Newtowne Athletic Club	Charles River Park; Cambridge, MA	W 6–0		
October 21	at New Hampshire	Durham, NH	W 6–0		
October 25	at Andover Academy	Andover, MA	W 6–0		
October 28	at Amherst	Amherst, MA	W 18–0		
November 4	All-College	South End Grounds; Boston, MA	W 6–0		
November 18	at Brown	Providence, RI	L 0–18	400	
November 30	Holy Cross	South End Grounds; Boston MA (rivalry)	W 17–0	6,000	
