= 1899 Villanova Wildcats football team =

American college football season

1899 Villanova Wildcats football
- Conference: Independent
- Record: 7–2–1
- Head coach: Dick Nallin (1st season)
- Captain: Dick Nallin
- Home stadium: None

1899 Eastern college football independents records
	Conf.			Overall
Team	W	L	T	W		L		T
Harvard		–		10	–	0	–	1
Lafayette		–		12	–	1	–	0
Princeton		–		12	–	1	–	0
Buffalo		–		7	–	1	–	0
Boston College		–		8	–	1	–	1
Carlisle		–		9	–	2	–	0
Swarthmore		–		8	–	1	–	2
Washington & Jefferson		–		9	–	2	–	1
Wesleyan		–		7	–	2	–	0
Pittsburgh College		–		2	–	0	–	2
Villanova		–		7	–	2	–	1
Yale		–		7	–	2	–	1
Western Univ. of Penn.		–		3	–	1	–	1
Columbia		–		9	–	3	–	0
Fordham		–		3	–	1	–	0
Cornell		–		7	–	3	–	0
Penn		–		8	–	3	–	2
Brown		–		7	–	3	–	1
New Hampshire		–		4	–	2	–	0
Vermont		–		5	–	3	–	0
Tufts		–		7	–	4	–	0
Bucknell		–		6	–	4	–	0
Dickinson		–		6	–	6	–	1
Holy Cross		–		5	–	5	–	0
Syracuse		–		4	–	4	–	0
Drexel		–		3	–	3	–	0
Army		–		4	–	5	–	0
Colgate		–		4	–	5	–	0
Penn State		–		4	–	6	–	1
Franklin & Marshall		–		3	–	5	–	1
NYU		–		2	–	6	–	0
Temple		–		1	–	4	–	1
Dartmouth		–		2	–	7	–	0
Lehigh		–		2	–	9	–	0
Rutgers		–		2	–	9	–	0
Geneva		–		0	–	3	–	0

The 1899 Villanova Wildcats football team represented the Villanova University during the 1899 college football season. The team's captain was Dick Nallin.

== Schedule ==
Date	Time	Opponent	Site	Result	Attendance	Source
October 4		at Lafayette	Easton, PA	L 0–13		
October 11		at Dickinson	Carlisle, PA	cancelled		
October 14		at The Hill School	Pottstown, PA	T 0–0		
		Lawrenceville School	Villanova, PA	W 18–5		
October 21		at Pennsylvania Railroad YMCA	P.R.R.Y.M.C.A. Grounds (52nd/Jefferson Sts); Philadelphia, PA	W 11–6		
October 25		Radnor Invincibles	Villanova, PA	W 32–0		
October 28		Manhattan College	Villanova, PA	W 6–0		
November 11		at Warren AA	Union Street grounds; Wilmington, DE	W 6–0		
November 18		at Manhattan College	New York, NY	L 0–17		
		Active AA	?	W 16–5		
November 30	3:00 p.m.	at St. Thomas (PA)	Athletic Park; Scranton, PA	W 5–0	1,500	
All times are in Eastern time
