= 1899 Swarthmore Quakers football team =

American college football season

1899 Swarthmore Quakers football
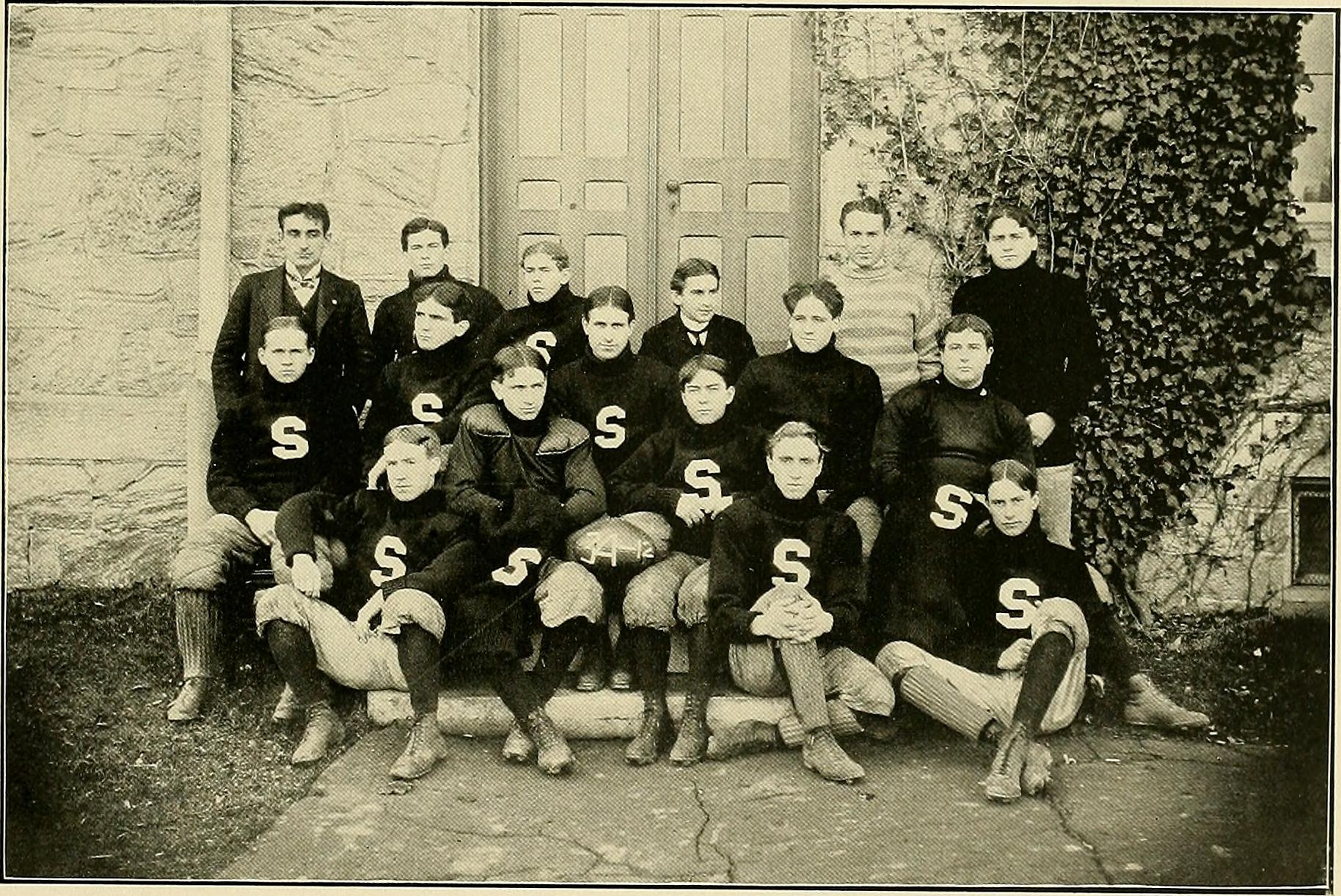
- Conference: Independent
- Record: 8–1–2
- Head coach: George H. Brooke (1st season)
- Home stadium: Whittier Field

1899 Eastern college football independents records
	Conf.			Overall
Team	W	L	T	W		L		T
Harvard		–		10	–	0	–	1
Lafayette		–		12	–	1	–	0
Princeton		–		12	–	1	–	0
Buffalo		–		7	–	1	–	0
Boston College		–		8	–	1	–	1
Carlisle		–		9	–	2	–	0
Swarthmore		–		8	–	1	–	2
Washington & Jefferson		–		9	–	2	–	1
Wesleyan		–		7	–	2	–	0
Pittsburgh College		–		2	–	0	–	2
Villanova		–		7	–	2	–	1
Yale		–		7	–	2	–	1
Western Univ. of Penn.		–		3	–	1	–	1
Columbia		–		9	–	3	–	0
Fordham		–		3	–	1	–	0
Cornell		–		7	–	3	–	0
Penn		–		8	–	3	–	2
Brown		–		7	–	3	–	1
New Hampshire		–		4	–	2	–	0
Vermont		–		5	–	3	–	0
Tufts		–		7	–	4	–	0
Bucknell		–		6	–	4	–	0
Dickinson		–		6	–	6	–	1
Holy Cross		–		5	–	5	–	0
Syracuse		–		4	–	4	–	0
Drexel		–		3	–	3	–	0
Army		–		4	–	5	–	0
Colgate		–		4	–	5	–	0
Penn State		–		4	–	6	–	1
Franklin & Marshall		–		3	–	5	–	1
NYU		–		2	–	6	–	0
Temple		–		1	–	4	–	1
Dartmouth		–		2	–	7	–	0
Lehigh		–		2	–	9	–	0
Rutgers		–		2	–	9	–	0
Geneva		–		0	–	3	–	0

The 1899 Swarthmore Quakers football team was an American football team that represented Swarthmore College as an independent during the 1899 college football season. The team compiled an 8–1–2 record. George H. Brooke was the head coach.

== Schedule ==
Date	Opponent	Site	Result	Source
September 30	Swarthmore alumni	Whittier Field; Swarthmore, PA	W 27–0	
October 7	Lafayette	Whittier Field; Swarthmore, PA	L 6–16	
October 14	at Ursinus	Norristown, PA	T 5–5	
October 18	Delaware	Whittier Field; Swarthmore, PA	W 17–0	
October 21	Johns Hopkins	Whittier Field; Swarthmore, PA	W 22–0	
October 25	at Rutgers	Neilson Field; New Brunswick, NJ	W 34–0	
October 28	Stevens	Whittier Field; Swarthmore, PA	W 22–0	
November 4	at Dickinson	Carlisle, PA	W 6–5	
November 7	Penn	Philadelphia, PA	T 5–5	
November 18	at Haverford	Haverford, PA (rivalry)	W 34–12	
November 30	at Franklin & Marshall	Williamson Field; Lancaster, PA	W 12–0	
