= 1899 Dartmouth football team =

American college football season

1899 Dartmouth football
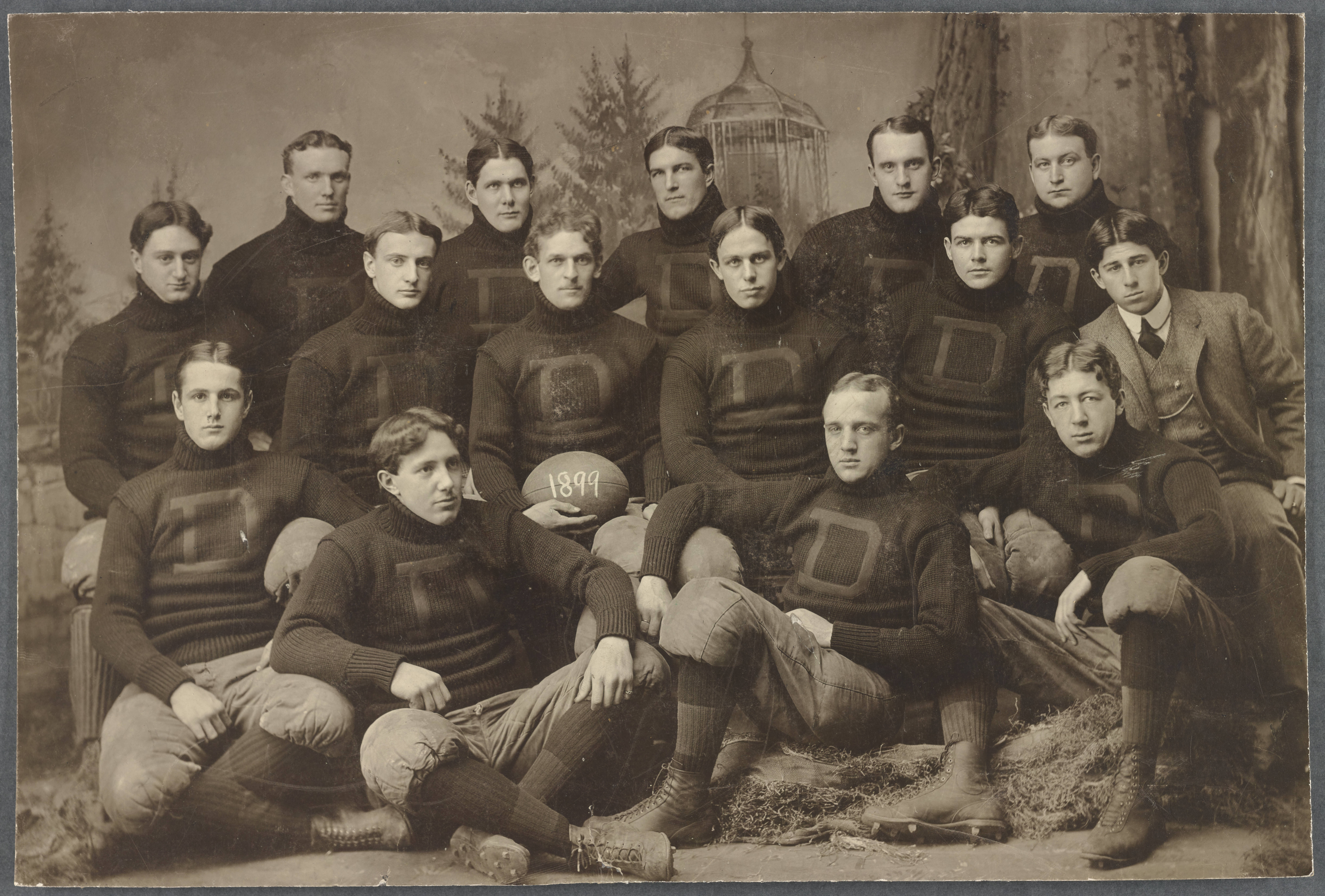
- Conference: Independent
- Record: 2–7
- Head coach: William Wurtenburg (5th season)
- Captain: Joseph Wentworth

1899 Eastern college football independents records
	Conf.			Overall
Team	W	L	T	W		L		T
Harvard		–		10	–	0	–	1
Lafayette		–		12	–	1	–	0
Princeton		–		12	–	1	–	0
Buffalo		–		7	–	1	–	0
Boston College		–		8	–	1	–	1
Carlisle		–		9	–	2	–	0
Swarthmore		–		8	–	1	–	2
Washington & Jefferson		–		9	–	2	–	1
Wesleyan		–		7	–	2	–	0
Pittsburgh College		–		2	–	0	–	2
Villanova		–		7	–	2	–	1
Yale		–		7	–	2	–	1
Western Univ. of Penn.		–		3	–	1	–	1
Columbia		–		9	–	3	–	0
Fordham		–		3	–	1	–	0
Cornell		–		7	–	3	–	0
Penn		–		8	–	3	–	2
Brown		–		7	–	3	–	1
New Hampshire		–		4	–	2	–	0
Vermont		–		5	–	3	–	0
Tufts		–		7	–	4	–	0
Bucknell		–		6	–	4	–	0
Dickinson		–		6	–	6	–	1
Holy Cross		–		5	–	5	–	0
Syracuse		–		4	–	4	–	0
Drexel		–		3	–	3	–	0
Army		–		4	–	5	–	0
Colgate		–		4	–	5	–	0
Penn State		–		4	–	6	–	1
Franklin & Marshall		–		3	–	5	–	1
NYU		–		2	–	6	–	0
Temple		–		1	–	4	–	1
Dartmouth		–		2	–	7	–	0
Lehigh		–		2	–	9	–	0
Rutgers		–		2	–	9	–	0
Geneva		–		0	–	3	–	0

The 1899 Dartmouth football team represented Dartmouth College as an independent during the 1899 college football season. This season was the least successful under head coach William Wurtenburg. Of the nine games played during the year, only two were won. The team finished with the worst win percentage (.286) since the 1883 squad went winless, albeit against one team. The season began with easy defeats of Phillips Exeter Academy and Bowdoine. That luck quickly changed and the team dropped seven straight games. After being shut out by Yale, they lost in a close match to Williams. Following another close loss, Army, Dartmouth was defeated by Wesleyan. The following game was the low point of the season, a 21–0 loss to Harvard. It was the worst defeat by the Crimson in nearly a decade. The year concluded with lopsided defeats by Columbia and Brown.

== Schedule ==
Date	Time	Opponent	Site	Result	Attendance	Source
September 30		Philips Exeter Academy	Hanover, NH	W 16–5		
October 7		Bowdoin	Hanover, NH	W 37–0		
October 14		vs. Yale	Newton Athletic Association grounds; Newton, MA	L 0–16		
October 21		Williams	Hanover, NH	L 10–12		
October 28		at Army	The Plain; West Point, NY	L 2–6		
November 4		at Wesleyan	Andrus Field; Middletown, CT	L 0–11		
November 11	3:00 p.m.	at Harvard	Soldiers' Field; Boston, MA (rivalry)	L 0–21	3,000	
November 18		at Columbia	Manhattan Field; New York, NY	L 0–22	1,000–1,500	
November 25	2:00 p.m.	at Brown	Providence, RI	L 5–16		
