= 1899 Bucknell football team =

American college football season

1899 Bucknell football
- Conference: Independent
- Record: 6–4
- Head coach: George W. Hoskins (1st season)
- Captain: Hugo Riemer

1899 Eastern college football independents records
	Conf.			Overall
Team	W	L	T	W		L		T
Harvard		–		10	–	0	–	1
Lafayette		–		12	–	1	–	0
Princeton		–		12	–	1	–	0
Buffalo		–		7	–	1	–	0
Boston College		–		8	–	1	–	1
Carlisle		–		9	–	2	–	0
Swarthmore		–		8	–	1	–	2
Washington & Jefferson		–		9	–	2	–	1
Wesleyan		–		7	–	2	–	0
Pittsburgh College		–		2	–	0	–	2
Villanova		–		7	–	2	–	1
Yale		–		7	–	2	–	1
Western Univ. of Penn.		–		3	–	1	–	1
Columbia		–		9	–	3	–	0
Fordham		–		3	–	1	–	0
Cornell		–		7	–	3	–	0
Penn		–		8	–	3	–	2
Brown		–		7	–	3	–	1
New Hampshire		–		4	–	2	–	0
Vermont		–		5	–	3	–	0
Tufts		–		7	–	4	–	0
Bucknell		–		6	–	4	–	0
Dickinson		–		6	–	6	–	1
Holy Cross		–		5	–	5	–	0
Syracuse		–		4	–	4	–	0
Drexel		–		3	–	3	–	0
Army		–		4	–	5	–	0
Colgate		–		4	–	5	–	0
Penn State		–		4	–	6	–	1
Franklin & Marshall		–		3	–	5	–	1
NYU		–		2	–	6	–	0
Temple		–		1	–	4	–	1
Dartmouth		–		2	–	7	–	0
Lehigh		–		2	–	9	–	0
Rutgers		–		2	–	9	–	0
Geneva		–		0	–	3	–	0

The 1899 Bucknell football team was an American football team that represented Bucknell University as an independent during the 1899 college football season. Led by first-year head coach George W. Hoskins, Bucknell compiled a record of 6–4. Hugo Riemer was the team captain.

== Schedule ==
Date	Time	Opponent	Site	Result	Attendance	Source
September 23		Wyoming Seminary	Lewisburg, PA	W 22–0		
September 30		at Williamsport Wheel Club	Williamsport, PA	W 22–5		
October 4		at Penn	Franklin Field; Philadelphia, PA	L 10–47		
October 7		Shamokin	Lewisburg, PA	W 40–0		
October 14		at Lehigh	Bethlehem, PA	W 5–0		
October 21		at Duquesne Country & Athletic Club	Exposition Park; Allegheny City, PA	L 0–35	2,500–3,000	
October 28		Susquehanna	Lewisburg, PA	W 45–0		
November 4		vs. Penn State	Athletic Park; Williamsport, PA	W 5–0	3,000	
November 18		at Lafayette	Lafayette Field; Easton, PA	L 0–12		
November 30	2:30 p.m.	at Buffalo	Buffalo Athletic Field; Buffalo, NY	L 0–30		
