= 1899 Army Cadets football team =

American college football season

1899 Army Cadets football
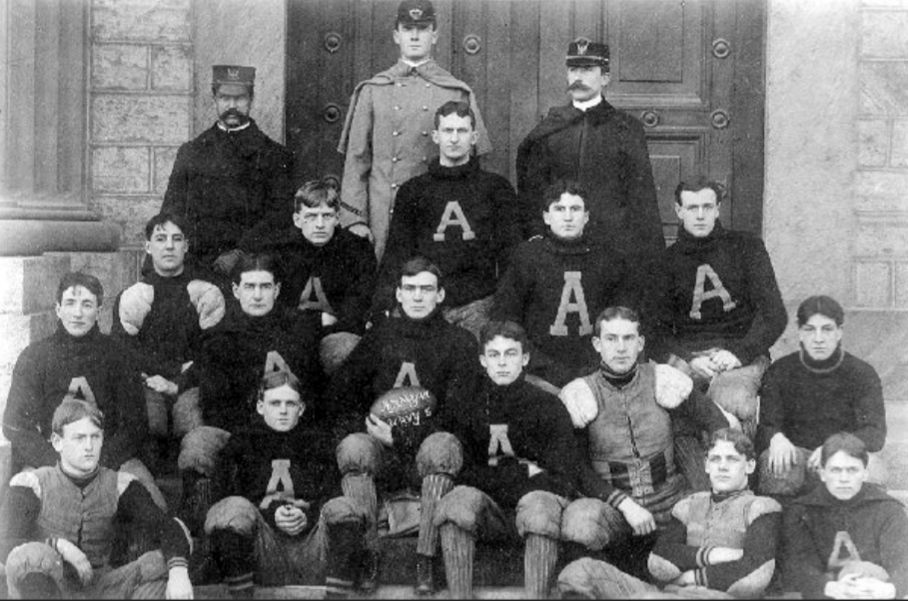
- Conference: Independent
- Record: 4–5
- Head coach: Herman Koehler (3rd season)
- Captain: Walter Smith
- Home stadium: The Plain

1899 Eastern college football independents records
	Conf.			Overall
Team	W	L	T	W		L		T
Harvard		–		10	–	0	–	1
Lafayette		–		12	–	1	–	0
Princeton		–		12	–	1	–	0
Buffalo		–		7	–	1	–	0
Boston College		–		8	–	1	–	1
Carlisle		–		9	–	2	–	0
Swarthmore		–		8	–	1	–	2
Washington & Jefferson		–		9	–	2	–	1
Wesleyan		–		7	–	2	–	0
Pittsburgh College		–		2	–	0	–	2
Villanova		–		7	–	2	–	1
Yale		–		7	–	2	–	1
Western Univ. of Penn.		–		3	–	1	–	1
Columbia		–		9	–	3	–	0
Fordham		–		3	–	1	–	0
Cornell		–		7	–	3	–	0
Penn		–		8	–	3	–	2
Brown		–		7	–	3	–	1
New Hampshire		–		4	–	2	–	0
Vermont		–		5	–	3	–	0
Tufts		–		7	–	4	–	0
Bucknell		–		6	–	4	–	0
Dickinson		–		6	–	6	–	1
Holy Cross		–		5	–	5	–	0
Syracuse		–		4	–	4	–	0
Drexel		–		3	–	3	–	0
Army		–		4	–	5	–	0
Colgate		–		4	–	5	–	0
Penn State		–		4	–	6	–	1
Franklin & Marshall		–		3	–	5	–	1
NYU		–		2	–	6	–	0
Temple		–		1	–	4	–	1
Dartmouth		–		2	–	7	–	0
Lehigh		–		2	–	9	–	0
Rutgers		–		2	–	9	–	0
Geneva		–		0	–	3	–	0

The 1899 Army Cadets football team represented the United States Military Academy as an independent during the 1899 college football season. In their third season under head coach Herman Koehler, the Cadets compiled a 4–5 record and were outscored by their opponents by a combined total of 100 to 57. In the annual Army–Navy Game, the Cadets defeated the Navy by a 17 to 5 score.

Army had faced Navy on each other's campuses between 1890 and 1893. Through the efforts and diplomacy of Philadelphia surgeon and sportsman Dr. J. William White, it was agreed to resume the series in 1899 at Franklin Field inaugurating the tradition of playing the game in Philadelphia.

== Schedule ==
Date	Opponent	Site	Result	Source
October 2	Tufts	The Plain; West Point, NY	W 22–0	
October 7	Penn State	The Plain; West Point, NY	L 0–6	
October 14	Harvard	The Plain; West Point, NY	L 0–18	
October 21	Princeton	The Plain; West Point, NY	L 0–23	
October 28	Dartmouth	The Plain; West Point, NY	W 6–2	
November 4	Yale	The Plain; West Point, NY	L 0–24	
November 11	Columbia	The Plain; West Point, NY	L 0–16	
November 18	Syracuse	The Plain; West Point, NY	W 12–6	
December 2	vs. Navy	Franklin Field; Philadelphia, PA (Army–Navy Game)	W 17–5	
