= 1899 Dickinson Red and White football team =

American college football season

1899 Dickinson Red and White football
- Conference: Independent
- Record: 6–6–1
- Head coach: Nathan Stauffer (4th season)

1899 Eastern college football independents records
	Conf.			Overall
Team	W	L	T	W		L		T
Harvard		–		10	–	0	–	1
Lafayette		–		12	–	1	–	0
Princeton		–		12	–	1	–	0
Buffalo		–		7	–	1	–	0
Boston College		–		8	–	1	–	1
Carlisle		–		9	–	2	–	0
Swarthmore		–		8	–	1	–	2
Washington & Jefferson		–		9	–	2	–	1
Wesleyan		–		7	–	2	–	0
Pittsburgh College		–		2	–	0	–	2
Villanova		–		7	–	2	–	1
Yale		–		7	–	2	–	1
Western Univ. of Penn.		–		3	–	1	–	1
Columbia		–		9	–	3	–	0
Fordham		–		3	–	1	–	0
Cornell		–		7	–	3	–	0
Penn		–		8	–	3	–	2
Brown		–		7	–	3	–	1
New Hampshire		–		4	–	2	–	0
Vermont		–		5	–	3	–	0
Tufts		–		7	–	4	–	0
Bucknell		–		6	–	4	–	0
Dickinson		–		6	–	6	–	1
Holy Cross		–		5	–	5	–	0
Syracuse		–		4	–	4	–	0
Drexel		–		3	–	3	–	0
Army		–		4	–	5	–	0
Colgate		–		4	–	5	–	0
Penn State		–		4	–	6	–	1
Franklin & Marshall		–		3	–	5	–	1
NYU		–		2	–	6	–	0
Temple		–		1	–	4	–	1
Dartmouth		–		2	–	7	–	0
Lehigh		–		2	–	9	–	0
Rutgers		–		2	–	9	–	0
Geneva		–		0	–	3	–	0

The 1899 Dickinson Red and White football team was an American football team that represented Dickinson College as an independent during the 1899 college football season. The team compiled a 6–6–1 record and outscored opponents by a total of 184 to 108. Nathan Stauffer was the head coach.

Andrew Kerr, later inducted into the College Football Hall of Fame, was a student at Dickinson at the time but did not play for the varsity football team.

== Schedule ==
Date	Opponent	Site	Result	Attendance	Source
September 20	Lebanon Valley	Carlisle, PA	W 36–0		
October 1	at Baltimore Medical	Maryland Oval; Baltimore, MD	W 11–0		
October 7	at Haverford	Haverford, PA	T 0–0		
October 11	Villanova	Carlisle, PA	cancelled		
October 14	at Franklin & Marshall	Lancaster, PA	W 51–0		
October 21	vs. Carlisle	Carlisle, PA	L 7–16	4,000	
October 28	at Penn State	Beaver Field; State College, PA	L 0–15		
November 4	Swarthmore	Carlisle, PA	L 5–6		
November 8	Mount St. Mary's	Carlisle, PA	W 41–0		
November 11	at Gettysburg	Gettysburg, PA	L 5–11		
November 15	at Georgetown	Georgetown Field; Washington, DC	W 5–0		
November 22	Syracuse	Carlisle, PA	L 7–18		
November 25	at Susquehanna	Selinsgrove, PA	W 16–6		
November 30	at Lafayette	March Field; Easton, PA	L 0–36	3,500	
