= 1899 Brown Bears football team =

American college football season

1899 Brown Bears football
- Conference: Independent
- Record: 7–3–1
- Head coach: Edward N. Robinson (2nd season)
- Captain: Henry S. Pratt

1899 Eastern college football independents records
	Conf.			Overall
Team	W	L	T	W		L		T
Harvard		–		10	–	0	–	1
Lafayette		–		12	–	1	–	0
Princeton		–		12	–	1	–	0
Buffalo		–		7	–	1	–	0
Boston College		–		8	–	1	–	1
Carlisle		–		9	–	2	–	0
Swarthmore		–		8	–	1	–	2
Washington & Jefferson		–		9	–	2	–	1
Wesleyan		–		7	–	2	–	0
Pittsburgh College		–		2	–	0	–	2
Villanova		–		7	–	2	–	1
Yale		–		7	–	2	–	1
Western Univ. of Penn.		–		3	–	1	–	1
Columbia		–		9	–	3	–	0
Fordham		–		3	–	1	–	0
Cornell		–		7	–	3	–	0
Penn		–		8	–	3	–	2
Brown		–		7	–	3	–	1
New Hampshire		–		4	–	2	–	0
Vermont		–		5	–	3	–	0
Tufts		–		7	–	4	–	0
Bucknell		–		6	–	4	–	0
Dickinson		–		6	–	6	–	1
Holy Cross		–		5	–	5	–	0
Syracuse		–		4	–	4	–	0
Drexel		–		3	–	3	–	0
Army		–		4	–	5	–	0
Colgate		–		4	–	5	–	0
Penn State		–		4	–	6	–	1
Franklin & Marshall		–		3	–	5	–	1
NYU		–		2	–	6	–	0
Temple		–		1	–	4	–	1
Dartmouth		–		2	–	7	–	0
Lehigh		–		2	–	9	–	0
Rutgers		–		2	–	9	–	0
Geneva		–		0	–	3	–	0

The 1899 Brown Bears football team represented Brown University as an independent during the 1899 college football season. Led by second-year head coach Edward N. Robinson, Brown compiled a record of 7–3–1. The team's captain was Henry S. Pratt.

== Schedule ==
Date	Time	Opponent	Site	Result	Attendance	Source
September 30		at Holy Cross	Worcester College Grounds; Worcester, MA	W 19–0		
October 4		Tufts	New athletic field; Providence, RI	W 6–0		
October 7		Penn	Providence, RI	T 6–6	1,000–2,000	
October 14		Campello	Providence, RI	W 25–0	350	
October 21	3:00 p.m.	at Harvard	Soldiers' Field; Boston, MA	L 0–11	7,000–8,000	
October 28		at Newton Athletic Association	Providence, RI	W 35–0		
November 4	3:15 p.m.	at Princeton	Osborne Field; Princeton, NJ	L 6–18	3,500	
November 11		Boston Tech	Brown Field; Providence, RI	W 38–0		
November 18		Boston College	Providence, RI	W 18–0	400	
November 25	2:00 p.m.	Dartmouth	Providence, RI	W 16–5		
November 30		at Chicago	Marshall Field; Chicago, IL	L 6–17	10,000	
