= 1899 Syracuse Orangemen football team =

American college football season

1899 Syracuse Orangemen football
- Conference: Independent
- Record: 4–4
- Head coach: Frank E. Wade (3rd season)
- Captain: Carl Dorr
- Home stadium: Old Oval

1899 Eastern college football independents records
	Conf.			Overall
Team	W	L	T	W		L		T
Harvard		–		10	–	0	–	1
Lafayette		–		12	–	1	–	0
Princeton		–		12	–	1	–	0
Buffalo		–		7	–	1	–	0
Boston College		–		8	–	1	–	1
Carlisle		–		9	–	2	–	0
Swarthmore		–		8	–	1	–	2
Washington & Jefferson		–		9	–	2	–	1
Wesleyan		–		7	–	2	–	0
Pittsburgh College		–		2	–	0	–	2
Villanova		–		7	–	2	–	1
Yale		–		7	–	2	–	1
Western Univ. of Penn.		–		3	–	1	–	1
Columbia		–		9	–	3	–	0
Fordham		–		3	–	1	–	0
Cornell		–		7	–	3	–	0
Penn		–		8	–	3	–	2
Brown		–		7	–	3	–	1
New Hampshire		–		4	–	2	–	0
Vermont		–		5	–	3	–	0
Tufts		–		7	–	4	–	0
Bucknell		–		6	–	4	–	0
Dickinson		–		6	–	6	–	1
Holy Cross		–		5	–	5	–	0
Syracuse		–		4	–	4	–	0
Drexel		–		3	–	3	–	0
Army		–		4	–	5	–	0
Colgate		–		4	–	5	–	0
Penn State		–		4	–	6	–	1
Franklin & Marshall		–		3	–	5	–	1
NYU		–		2	–	6	–	0
Temple		–		1	–	4	–	1
Dartmouth		–		2	–	7	–	0
Lehigh		–		2	–	9	–	0
Rutgers		–		2	–	9	–	0
Geneva		–		0	–	3	–	0

The 1899 Syracuse Orangemen football team represented Syracuse University as an independent during the 1899 college football season. The head coach was Frank E. Wade, coaching his third season with the Orangemen.

== Schedule ==
Date	Opponent	Site	Result	Source
September 27	at Cornell	Percy Field; Ithaca, NY	L 0–17	
October 7	Syracuse Athletic Association	Syracuse, NY	W 6–0	
October 14	NYU	Syracuse, NY	W 10–5	
October 28	Williams	Syracuse, NY	L 0–6	
November 4	Buffalo	University Oval; Syracuse, NY	L 0–16	
November 11	at Rochester	Rochester, NY	W 23–0	
November 18	at Army	The Plain; West Point, NY	L 6–12	
November 22	at Dickinson	Carlisle, PA	W 18–7	
