= George A. Sawin =

American football player and electrical engineer (1878–1961)

Profile
- Position: Halfback

Personal information
- Born: October 1878; Massachusetts, U.S.
- Died: November 29, 1961 (age 83); Scarsdale, New York, U.S.

Career information
- College: Harvard (1899–1900)

Awards and highlights
- Second-team All-American (1900)

George Alfred Sawin (October 1878 – November 29, 1961) was an American football player and electrical engineer.

== Early life ==
Sawin was born in 1878 in Massachusetts.

== Harvard ==
Sawin attended Harvard College where he played at the halfback position for the Harvard Crimson football team from 1897 to 1900. He also handled punting and place-kicking for Harvard. He starred on the undefeated 1899 Harvard Crimson football team that has been recognized as that year's national champion. He was selected as a first-team All-American in 1899 by The Philadelphia Inquirer, the New York Tribune and the New York Sun. He also starred for the 1900 Harvard team that compiled a 10–1 and was named a second-team All-American by both Walter Camp and Caspar Whitney at the end of the 1900 season.

== Later life ==
After graduating from Harvard, Sawin had a career an electrical engineer, beginning with the meter department at General Electric Co. in West Lynn, Massachusetts, and then with the Public Service Electric Company of Newark, New Jersey. From 1920 to 1945, he worked for Westinghouse Electrical & Manufacturing Company in Pittsburgh. He and his wife, Grace Scofield Sawin, had a daughter and a son. In retirement, Sawin lived in Scarsdale, New York. He died at his daughter's home in Scarsdale in 1961 at age 83.
