= 1899 New Hampshire football team =

American college football season

1899 New Hampshire football
- Conference: Independent
- Record: 4–2 (Note: per the University's media guide; 1899 sources differ)
- Head coach: None
- Captain: Unknown (Note: The New Hampshire College Monthly did not publish a team photo, which for the prior five seasons had listed starting players and identified the team captain.)
- Home stadium: College grounds, Durham, NH

1899 Eastern college football independents records
	Conf.			Overall
Team	W	L	T	W		L		T
Harvard		–		10	–	0	–	1
Lafayette		–		12	–	1	–	0
Princeton		–		12	–	1	–	0
Buffalo		–		7	–	1	–	0
Boston College		–		8	–	1	–	1
Carlisle		–		9	–	2	–	0
Swarthmore		–		8	–	1	–	2
Washington & Jefferson		–		9	–	2	–	1
Wesleyan		–		7	–	2	–	0
Pittsburgh College		–		2	–	0	–	2
Villanova		–		7	–	2	–	1
Yale		–		7	–	2	–	1
Western Univ. of Penn.		–		3	–	1	–	1
Columbia		–		9	–	3	–	0
Fordham		–		3	–	1	–	0
Cornell		–		7	–	3	–	0
Penn		–		8	–	3	–	2
Brown		–		7	–	3	–	1
New Hampshire		–		4	–	2	–	0
Vermont		–		5	–	3	–	0
Tufts		–		7	–	4	–	0
Bucknell		–		6	–	4	–	0
Dickinson		–		6	–	6	–	1
Holy Cross		–		5	–	5	–	0
Syracuse		–		4	–	4	–	0
Drexel		–		3	–	3	–	0
Army		–		4	–	5	–	0
Colgate		–		4	–	5	–	0
Penn State		–		4	–	6	–	1
Franklin & Marshall		–		3	–	5	–	1
NYU		–		2	–	6	–	0
Temple		–		1	–	4	–	1
Dartmouth		–		2	–	7	–	0
Lehigh		–		2	–	9	–	0
Rutgers		–		2	–	9	–	0
Geneva		–		0	–	3	–	0

The 1899 New Hampshire football team (Note: The school did not adopt the Wildcats nickname until February 1926; before then, they were generally referred to as "the blue and white".) was an American football team that represented New Hampshire College of Agriculture and the Mechanic Arts (Note: The school was often referred to as New Hampshire College or New Hampshire State College in newspapers of the era.) during the 1899 college football season—the school became the University of New Hampshire in 1923. The team finished with a record of 3–3–1 or 4–2, per 1899 sources or modern sources, respectively.

== Schedule ==
Scoring during this era awarded five points for a touchdown, one point for a conversion kick (extra point), and five points for a field goal. Teams played in the one-platoon system and the forward pass was not yet legal. Games were played in two halves rather than four quarters.

Date	Opponent	Site	per 1899 sources		per modern sources	
Date	Opponent	Site	Result	Source	Result	Source
September 30	Exeter Academy (second team)	Durham, NH	W 18–2		not listed	
October 7	MIT	Durham, NH	L 5–6		L 5–6	
October 11	at Andover Academy	Andover, MA	W 6–0		W 6–0	
October 14	East Rochester	Durham, NH	NH second team		W 8–0	
October 18	Somersworth	Durham, NH	NH second team		W 16–0	
October 21	Boston College	Durham, NH	L 0–6		L 0–6	
October 28	at Portsmouth Athletic Assoc.	Portsmouth, NH	T 0–0		not listed	
November 1	at Exeter Academy (varsity)	Exeter, NH	L 0–29		not listed	
November 4	at Vermont	Athletic Park · Burlington, VT	W 6–5		W 6–5	
Overall record			(3–3–1)		(4–2)	

A December editorial in The New Hampshire College Monthly stated that the team's record was 3–3–1, whereas College Football Data Warehouse and the University's media guide list a record of 4–2.

Contemporary sources are clear that the Vermont game was played in Vermont; modern sources list the site as Durham.

The October 21 game was the first meeting between the New Hampshire and Boston College football programs. The November 4 game was the first meeting between the New Hampshire and Vermont football programs.
