= 1899 Buffalo football team =

American college football season

1899 Buffalo football
- Conference: Independent
- Record: 7–1
- Head coach: Bemus Pierce (1st season)
- Captain: Seth Thomas
- Home stadium: Buffalo Athletic Field

1899 Eastern college football independents records
	Conf.			Overall
Team	W	L	T	W		L		T
Harvard		–		10	–	0	–	1
Lafayette		–		12	–	1	–	0
Princeton		–		12	–	1	–	0
Buffalo		–		7	–	1	–	0
Boston College		–		8	–	1	–	1
Carlisle		–		9	–	2	–	0
Swarthmore		–		8	–	1	–	2
Washington & Jefferson		–		9	–	2	–	1
Wesleyan		–		7	–	2	–	0
Pittsburgh College		–		2	–	0	–	2
Villanova		–		7	–	2	–	1
Yale		–		7	–	2	–	1
Western Univ. of Penn.		–		3	–	1	–	1
Columbia		–		9	–	3	–	0
Fordham		–		3	–	1	–	0
Cornell		–		7	–	3	–	0
Penn		–		8	–	3	–	2
Brown		–		7	–	3	–	1
New Hampshire		–		4	–	2	–	0
Vermont		–		5	–	3	–	0
Tufts		–		7	–	4	–	0
Bucknell		–		6	–	4	–	0
Dickinson		–		6	–	6	–	1
Holy Cross		–		5	–	5	–	0
Syracuse		–		4	–	4	–	0
Drexel		–		3	–	3	–	0
Army		–		4	–	5	–	0
Colgate		–		4	–	5	–	0
Penn State		–		4	–	6	–	1
Franklin & Marshall		–		3	–	5	–	1
NYU		–		2	–	6	–	0
Temple		–		1	–	4	–	1
Dartmouth		–		2	–	7	–	0
Lehigh		–		2	–	9	–	0
Rutgers		–		2	–	9	–	0
Geneva		–		0	–	3	–	0

The 1899 Buffalo football team represented the University of Buffalo as an independent during the 1899 college football season. Under head coach Bemus Pierce, the team finished the season 7–1 overall. No collegiate team was able to score on them the entire year. The Buffalo offense scored 177 points while the defense allowed 52 points.

== Schedule ==
Date	Time	Opponent	Site	Result	Attendance	Source
October 14	3:50 p.m.	Rochester	Buffalo Athletic Field; Buffalo, NY	W 6–0		
October 21		Case	Buffalo Athletic Field; Buffalo, NY	W 18–0		
October 28		at Duquesne Country and Athletic Club	Exposition Park; Allegheny, PA	L 5–52		
November 4		at Syracuse	University Oval; Syracuse, NY	W 16–0		
November 7	3:15 p.m.	Hobart	Buffalo Athletic Field; Buffalo, NY	W 51–0		
November 11	3:00 p.m.	Erie Athletic Association	Buffalo Athletic Field; Buffalo, NY	W 46–0	200	
November 18		at Western Reserve	Cleveland, OH	W 5–0		
November 30	2:30 p.m.	Bucknell	Buffalo Athletic Field; Buffalo, NY	W 30–0		
