= 1899 Drexel Dragons football team =

American college football season

1899 Drexel Dragons football
- Conference: Independent
- Record: 3–3
- Head coach: None

1899 Eastern college football independents records
	Conf.			Overall
Team	W	L	T	W		L		T
Harvard		–		10	–	0	–	1
Lafayette		–		12	–	1	–	0
Princeton		–		12	–	1	–	0
Buffalo		–		7	–	1	–	0
Boston College		–		8	–	1	–	1
Carlisle		–		9	–	2	–	0
Swarthmore		–		8	–	1	–	2
Washington & Jefferson		–		9	–	2	–	1
Wesleyan		–		7	–	2	–	0
Pittsburgh College		–		2	–	0	–	2
Villanova		–		7	–	2	–	1
Yale		–		7	–	2	–	1
Western Univ. of Penn.		–		3	–	1	–	1
Columbia		–		9	–	3	–	0
Fordham		–		3	–	1	–	0
Cornell		–		7	–	3	–	0
Penn		–		8	–	3	–	2
Brown		–		7	–	3	–	1
New Hampshire		–		4	–	2	–	0
Vermont		–		5	–	3	–	0
Tufts		–		7	–	4	–	0
Bucknell		–		6	–	4	–	0
Dickinson		–		6	–	6	–	1
Holy Cross		–		5	–	5	–	0
Syracuse		–		4	–	4	–	0
Drexel		–		3	–	3	–	0
Army		–		4	–	5	–	0
Colgate		–		4	–	5	–	0
Penn State		–		4	–	6	–	1
Franklin & Marshall		–		3	–	5	–	1
NYU		–		2	–	6	–	0
Temple		–		1	–	4	–	1
Dartmouth		–		2	–	7	–	0
Lehigh		–		2	–	9	–	0
Rutgers		–		2	–	9	–	0
Geneva		–		0	–	3	–	0

The 1899 Drexel Dragons football team represented Drexel Institute of Art, Science and Industry (know known as Drexel University) as an independent during the 1899 college football season. Led without a head coach Drexel, compiled an overall record of 3–3.

== Schedule ==
Date	Opponent	Site	Result	Source
October 10	DeLancey School (PA)	Stenton Field; Philadelphia, PA	Cancelled	
October 13	at Cheltenham Military Academy	Ognotz; Philadelphia, PA	W 13–0	
October 17	at Germantown Academy	Philadelphia, PA	W 11–0	
October 24	at William Penn Charter School	PRR/YMCA Grounds; Philadelphia, PA	L 0–6	
October 28	at Penn Freshman (1903 Frosh)	Philadelphia, PA	L 0–11	
November 6	at The Hill School	Pottstown, PA	L 0–46	
November 17	at St. Luke's	Bustleton; Philadelphia, PA	–	
November 22	at Pennsylvania Medial College	Philadelphia, PA	W 11–0	
November 23	at Philadelphia Textile		–	
