= 1899 Lehigh football team =

American college football season

1899 Lehigh football
- Conference: Independent
- Record: 2–9
- Head coach: Samuel Huston Thompson (2nd season)

1899 Eastern college football independents records
	Conf.			Overall
Team	W	L	T	W		L		T
Harvard		–		10	–	0	–	1
Lafayette		–		12	–	1	–	0
Princeton		–		12	–	1	–	0
Buffalo		–		7	–	1	–	0
Boston College		–		8	–	1	–	1
Carlisle		–		9	–	2	–	0
Swarthmore		–		8	–	1	–	2
Washington & Jefferson		–		9	–	2	–	1
Wesleyan		–		7	–	2	–	0
Pittsburgh College		–		2	–	0	–	2
Villanova		–		7	–	2	–	1
Yale		–		7	–	2	–	1
Western Univ. of Penn.		–		3	–	1	–	1
Columbia		–		9	–	3	–	0
Fordham		–		3	–	1	–	0
Cornell		–		7	–	3	–	0
Penn		–		8	–	3	–	2
Brown		–		7	–	3	–	1
New Hampshire		–		4	–	2	–	0
Vermont		–		5	–	3	–	0
Tufts		–		7	–	4	–	0
Bucknell		–		6	–	4	–	0
Dickinson		–		6	–	6	–	1
Holy Cross		–		5	–	5	–	0
Syracuse		–		4	–	4	–	0
Drexel		–		3	–	3	–	0
Army		–		4	–	5	–	0
Colgate		–		4	–	5	–	0
Penn State		–		4	–	6	–	1
Franklin & Marshall		–		3	–	5	–	1
NYU		–		2	–	6	–	0
Temple		–		1	–	4	–	1
Dartmouth		–		2	–	7	–	0
Lehigh		–		2	–	9	–	0
Rutgers		–		2	–	9	–	0
Geneva		–		0	–	3	–	0

The 1899 Lehigh football team was an American football team that represented Lehigh University as an independent during the 1899 college football season. In its second and final season under head coach Samuel Huston Thompson, the team compiled a 2–9 record and was outscored by a total of 144 to 60.

== Schedule ==
Date	Time	Opponent	Site	Result	Attendance	Source
September 30		at Penn	Franklin Field; Philadelphia, PA	L 0–20		
October 7		Rutgers	Bethlehem, PA	W 10–0		
October 14		Bucknell	Bethlehem, PA	L 0–5		
October 21		at Cornell	Percy Field; Ithaca, NY	L 0–6		
October 25		at Princeton	University Field; Princeton, NJ	L 0–17		
October 28		NYU	Bethlehem, PA	W 50–0		
November 4		at Lafayette	Lafayette Field; Easton, PA (rivalry)	L 0–17	4,000	
November 11		at Newark Athletic Club	Newark, NJ	L 0–10		
November 18		at Navy	Worden Field; Annapolis, MD	L 0–24		
November 25		Lafayette	Bethlehem, PA	L 0–35	4,000	
November 30	2:30 p.m.	vs. Virginia	Broad Street Park; Richmond, VA	L 0–10	4,000	
