= 1899 Colgate football team =

American college football season

1899 Colgate football
- Conference: Independent
- Record: 4–5
- Head coach: Joseph Stannard (1st season)
- Captain: William Root

1899 Eastern college football independents records
	Conf.			Overall
Team	W	L	T	W		L		T
Harvard		–		10	–	0	–	1
Lafayette		–		12	–	1	–	0
Princeton		–		12	–	1	–	0
Buffalo		–		7	–	1	–	0
Boston College		–		8	–	1	–	1
Carlisle		–		9	–	2	–	0
Swarthmore		–		8	–	1	–	2
Washington & Jefferson		–		9	–	2	–	1
Wesleyan		–		7	–	2	–	0
Pittsburgh College		–		2	–	0	–	2
Villanova		–		7	–	2	–	1
Yale		–		7	–	2	–	1
Western Univ. of Penn.		–		3	–	1	–	1
Columbia		–		9	–	3	–	0
Fordham		–		3	–	1	–	0
Cornell		–		7	–	3	–	0
Penn		–		8	–	3	–	2
Brown		–		7	–	3	–	1
New Hampshire		–		4	–	2	–	0
Vermont		–		5	–	3	–	0
Tufts		–		7	–	4	–	0
Bucknell		–		6	–	4	–	0
Dickinson		–		6	–	6	–	1
Holy Cross		–		5	–	5	–	0
Syracuse		–		4	–	4	–	0
Drexel		–		3	–	3	–	0
Army		–		4	–	5	–	0
Colgate		–		4	–	5	–	0
Penn State		–		4	–	6	–	1
Franklin & Marshall		–		3	–	5	–	1
NYU		–		2	–	6	–	0
Temple		–		1	–	4	–	1
Dartmouth		–		2	–	7	–	0
Lehigh		–		2	–	9	–	0
Rutgers		–		2	–	9	–	0
Geneva		–		0	–	3	–	0

The 1899 Colgate football team represented Colgate University in the 1899 college football season. Colgate reports the record for the season as 3–5, however, a reporting error in early record keeping failed to account for an 11–0 victory over Colgate Academy.

== Schedule ==
Date	Opponent	Site	Result
September 23	vs. Cornell	Richfield Springs, NY (rivalry)	L 0–42
September 30	Colgate Academy	Hamilton, NY	W 11–0
October 7	Hamilton	Hamilton, NY	L 0–30
October 14	St. John's Academy	Hamilton, NY	W 17–0
October 20	Syracuse A.A.	Hamilton, NY	L 6–12
October 28	at St. John's Academy	Manlius, NY	W 12–0
November 4	at Union (NY)	Schenectady, NY	W 12–5
November 11	vs. Vermont	Albany, NY	L 0–6
November 18	vs. Hamilton	Utica, NY	L 0–38
