= 1899 Vermont Green and Gold football team =

American college football season

1899 Vermont Green and Gold football
- Conference: Independent
- Record: 5–3
- Head coach: D. M. McLaughlin (2nd season)
- Home stadium: Athletic Park

1899 Eastern college football independents records
	Conf.			Overall
Team	W	L	T	W		L		T
Harvard		–		10	–	0	–	1
Lafayette		–		12	–	1	–	0
Princeton		–		12	–	1	–	0
Buffalo		–		7	–	1	–	0
Boston College		–		8	–	1	–	1
Carlisle		–		9	–	2	–	0
Swarthmore		–		8	–	1	–	2
Washington & Jefferson		–		9	–	2	–	1
Wesleyan		–		7	–	2	–	0
Pittsburgh College		–		2	–	0	–	2
Villanova		–		7	–	2	–	1
Yale		–		7	–	2	–	1
Western Univ. of Penn.		–		3	–	1	–	1
Columbia		–		9	–	3	–	0
Fordham		–		3	–	1	–	0
Cornell		–		7	–	3	–	0
Penn		–		8	–	3	–	2
Brown		–		7	–	3	–	1
New Hampshire		–		4	–	2	–	0
Vermont		–		5	–	3	–	0
Tufts		–		7	–	4	–	0
Bucknell		–		6	–	4	–	0
Dickinson		–		6	–	6	–	1
Holy Cross		–		5	–	5	–	0
Syracuse		–		4	–	4	–	0
Drexel		–		3	–	3	–	0
Army		–		4	–	5	–	0
Colgate		–		4	–	5	–	0
Penn State		–		4	–	6	–	1
Franklin & Marshall		–		3	–	5	–	1
NYU		–		2	–	6	–	0
Temple		–		1	–	4	–	1
Dartmouth		–		2	–	7	–	0
Lehigh		–		2	–	9	–	0
Rutgers		–		2	–	9	–	0
Geneva		–		0	–	3	–	0

The 1899 Vermont Green and Gold football team was an American football team that represented the University of Vermont as an independent during the 1899 college football season. In their second year under head coach D. M. McLaughlin, the team compiled a 5–3 record.

== Schedule ==
Date	Opponent	Site	Result	Source
October 5	Brigham Academy	Athletic Park; Burlington, VT	W 23–0	
October 16	Montpelier Seminary	Athletic Park; Burlington, VT	W 18–5	
October 21	Middlebury	Athletic Park; Burlington, VT	W 49–0	
October 24	Norwich	Athletic Park; Burlington, VT	W 13–0	
October 28	Massachusetts	Athletic Park; Burlington, VT	L 6–11	
November 4	New Hampshire	Athletic Park; Burlington, VT	L 5–6	
November 11	vs. Colgate	Ridgefield Park; Albany, NY	W 6–0	
November 25	at Holy Cross	Worcester College Grounds; Worcester, MA	L 0–45	
