= 1899 Penn State football team =

American college football season

1899 Penn State football
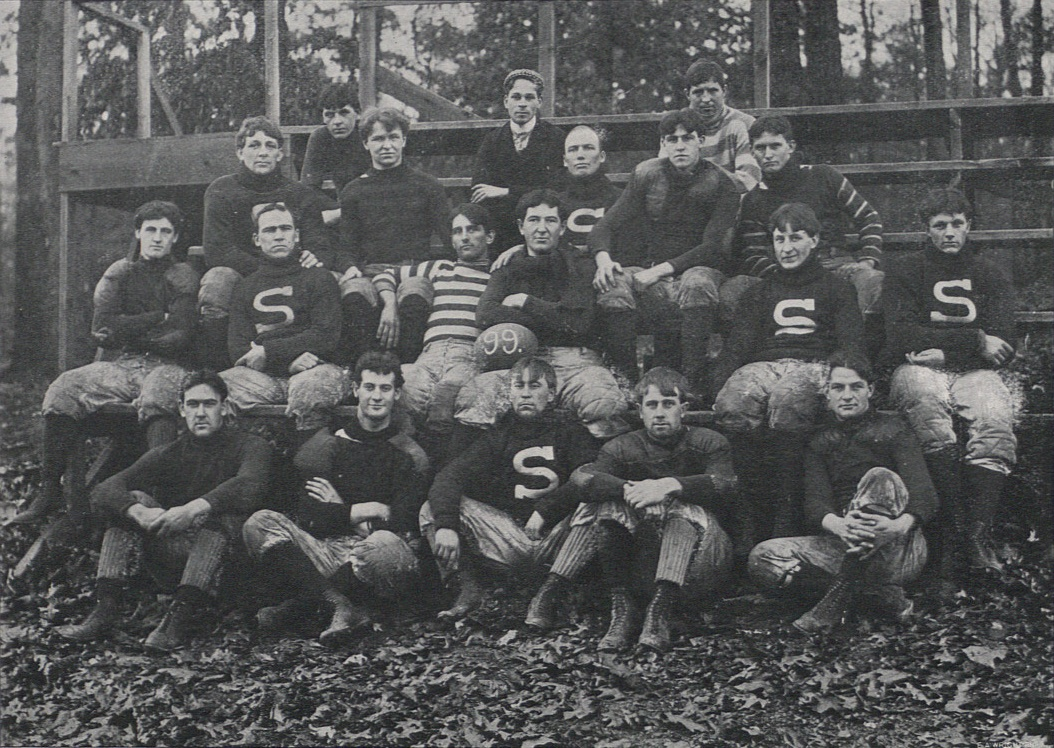
- Conference: Independent
- Record: 4–6–1
- Head coach: Sam Boyle (1st season)
- Captain: Brute Randolph
- Home stadium: Beaver Field

1899 Eastern college football independents records
	Conf.			Overall
Team	W	L	T	W		L		T
Harvard		–		10	–	0	–	1
Lafayette		–		12	–	1	–	0
Princeton		–		12	–	1	–	0
Buffalo		–		7	–	1	–	0
Boston College		–		8	–	1	–	1
Carlisle		–		9	–	2	–	0
Swarthmore		–		8	–	1	–	2
Washington & Jefferson		–		9	–	2	–	1
Wesleyan		–		7	–	2	–	0
Pittsburgh College		–		2	–	0	–	2
Villanova		–		7	–	2	–	1
Yale		–		7	–	2	–	1
Western Univ. of Penn.		–		3	–	1	–	1
Columbia		–		9	–	3	–	0
Fordham		–		3	–	1	–	0
Cornell		–		7	–	3	–	0
Penn		–		8	–	3	–	2
Brown		–		7	–	3	–	1
New Hampshire		–		4	–	2	–	0
Vermont		–		5	–	3	–	0
Tufts		–		7	–	4	–	0
Bucknell		–		6	–	4	–	0
Dickinson		–		6	–	6	–	1
Holy Cross		–		5	–	5	–	0
Syracuse		–		4	–	4	–	0
Drexel		–		3	–	3	–	0
Army		–		4	–	5	–	0
Colgate		–		4	–	5	–	0
Penn State		–		4	–	6	–	1
Franklin & Marshall		–		3	–	5	–	1
NYU		–		2	–	6	–	0
Temple		–		1	–	4	–	1
Dartmouth		–		2	–	7	–	0
Lehigh		–		2	–	9	–	0
Rutgers		–		2	–	9	–	0
Geneva		–		0	–	3	–	0

The 1899 Penn State football team was an American football team that represented Pennsylvania State College—now known as Pennsylvania State University–as an independent during the 1899 college football season. The team was coached by Sam Boyle and played its home games on Beaver Field in University Park, Pennsylvania.

== Schedule ==
Date	Time	Opponent	Site	Result	Attendance	Source
September 23		Mansfield	Beaver Field; State College, PA	W 38–0		
September 30		Gettysburg	Beaver Field; State College, PA	W 40–0		
October 7		at Army	The Plain; West Point, NY	W 6–0		
October 13	3:30 p.m.	Washington & Jefferson	Beaver Field; State College, PA	T 0–0	1,500–2,000	
October 18	3:20 p.m.	at Princeton	University Field; Princeton, NJ	L 0–12		
October 21		at Navy	Worden Field; Annapolis, MD	L 0–6		
October 28		Dickinson	Beaver Field; State College, PA	W 15–0		
November 4		vs. Bucknell	Athletic Park; Williamsport, PA	L 0–5	3,000	
November 11		at Yale	Yale Field; New Haven, CT	L 0–42	3,000	
November 17		at Penn	Franklin Field; Philadelphia, PA	L 0–47		
November 25		at Duquesne Country and Athletic Club	Exposition Park; Pittsburgh, PA	L 5–64	3,500	
