= 1899 Yale Bulldogs football team =

American college football season

1899 Yale Bulldogs football
- Conference: Independent
- Record: 7–2–1
- Head coach: James O. Rodgers (1st season)
- Captain: Malcolm McBride
- Home stadium: Yale Field

1899 Eastern college football independents records
	Conf.			Overall
Team	W	L	T	W		L		T
Harvard		–		10	–	0	–	1
Lafayette		–		12	–	1	–	0
Princeton		–		12	–	1	–	0
Buffalo		–		7	–	1	–	0
Boston College		–		8	–	1	–	1
Carlisle		–		9	–	2	–	0
Swarthmore		–		8	–	1	–	2
Washington & Jefferson		–		9	–	2	–	1
Wesleyan		–		7	–	2	–	0
Pittsburgh College		–		2	–	0	–	2
Villanova		–		7	–	2	–	1
Yale		–		7	–	2	–	1
Western Univ. of Penn.		–		3	–	1	–	1
Columbia		–		9	–	3	–	0
Fordham		–		3	–	1	–	0
Cornell		–		7	–	3	–	0
Penn		–		8	–	3	–	2
Brown		–		7	–	3	–	1
New Hampshire		–		4	–	2	–	0
Vermont		–		5	–	3	–	0
Tufts		–		7	–	4	–	0
Bucknell		–		6	–	4	–	0
Dickinson		–		6	–	6	–	1
Holy Cross		–		5	–	5	–	0
Syracuse		–		4	–	4	–	0
Drexel		–		3	–	3	–	0
Army		–		4	–	5	–	0
Colgate		–		4	–	5	–	0
Penn State		–		4	–	6	–	1
Franklin & Marshall		–		3	–	5	–	1
NYU		–		2	–	6	–	0
Temple		–		1	–	4	–	1
Dartmouth		–		2	–	7	–	0
Lehigh		–		2	–	9	–	0
Rutgers		–		2	–	9	–	0
Geneva		–		0	–	3	–	0

The 1899 Yale Bulldogs football team represented Yale University in the 1899 college football season. The team compiled a 7–2–1 record, recorded eight shutouts, and outscored all opponents by a total of 191 to 16. The team defeated Wisconsin (6–0), Army (24–0), and Penn State (42–0), played a scoreless tie against Harvard, and lost to Columbia (0–5) and Princeton (10–11).

The loss to Columbia at Manhattan Field was described by The New York Times as "one of the most disastrous defeats Yale has ever experienced in her athletic history." Columbia's freshman back Harold Weekes scored the game's only points on a 50-yard touchdown run in the middle of the second half. A relative unknown in 1899, Weekes was selected as a consensus All-American in 1901 and was later inducted into the College Football Hall of Fame.

Harvard and Princeton are recognized as the national champions for the 1899 season. Yale played the former to a scoreless tie and lost by one point to the latter. The loss to Princeton was decided with one minute left in the game by a dropkicked field goal (then worth five points) from the 35-yard line by Princeton's All-American Art Poe.

Four Yale players (halfback Albert Sharpe, fullback Malcolm McBride, tackle George S. Stillman and guard Gordon Brown) were consensus picks for the 1899 College Football All-America Team.

The team's head coach was James O. Rodgers who had played for Yale from 1894 to 1897. He was announced as the head coach on September 28, 1899, just two days before the season opened. Rodgers was at the time a student at Harvard Law School and was unable to devote his full time to coaching the team. Rodgers was assisted as the team's coach by Walter Camp and Fred Murphy.

== Schedule ==
Date	Opponent	Site	Result	Attendance	Source
September 30	Amherst	Yale Field; New Haven, CT	W 23–0		
October 4	Trinity (CT)	Yale Field; New Haven, CT	W 46–0		
October 7	Bates	Yale Field; New Haven, CT	W 28–0		
October 14	vs. Dartmouth	Newton Athletic Association grounds; Newton, MA	W 12–0		
October 21	Wisconsin	Yale Field; New Haven, CT	W 6–0		
October 28	at Columbia	Manhattan Field; New York, NY	L 0–5	5,000	
November 4	at Army	West Point, NY	W 24–0		
November 11	Penn State	Yale Field; New Haven, CT	W 42–0	3,000	
November 18	at Harvard	Soldiers' Field; Cambridge, MA (rivalry)	T 0–0	50,000	
November 25	Princeton	Yale Field; New Haven, CT (rivalry)	L 10–11	15,000	

== Roster ==
- Thomas S. Adams, HB
- Frederick W. Allen, T
- Auchincloss, FB
- Bain, G
- Augustus S. Blagden, T
- Gordon Brown, G
- George B. Chadwick, HB
- Clarence P. Cook
- Sonny Cunha, C
- Charles de Saulles, QB
- Charles Dupee, FB
- William Fincke, QB
- David R. Francis, T
- William P. Gibson, E
- Charles Gould, E
- Perry Hale, T
- George W. Hubbell, E
- Robert B. Keane, HB
- Kiefer, HB
- Malcolm McBride, FB
- McConnell, C
- Ledyard Mitchell, E
- Herman Olcott, G
- Howard Richards, E
- Ralph R. Richardson
- Richard J. Schweppe, E
- Albert Sharpe, HB
- Shattuck, HB
- Edwin N. Snitjer, E
- George S. Stillman, T
- Leonard M. Thomas, E
- Tomlinson, C
- G. B. Ward
- James H. Wear
- Keyes Winter, E
