= 1899 Cornell Big Red football team =

American college football season

1899 Cornell Big Red football
- Conference: Independent
- Record: 7–3
- Head coach: Percy Haughton (1st season)
- Captain: Raymond Starbuck
- Home stadium: Percy Field

1899 Eastern college football independents records
	Conf.			Overall
Team	W	L	T	W		L		T
Harvard		–		10	–	0	–	1
Lafayette		–		12	–	1	–	0
Princeton		–		12	–	1	–	0
Buffalo		–		7	–	1	–	0
Boston College		–		8	–	1	–	1
Carlisle		–		9	–	2	–	0
Swarthmore		–		8	–	1	–	2
Washington & Jefferson		–		9	–	2	–	1
Wesleyan		–		7	–	2	–	0
Pittsburgh College		–		2	–	0	–	2
Villanova		–		7	–	2	–	1
Yale		–		7	–	2	–	1
Western Univ. of Penn.		–		3	–	1	–	1
Columbia		–		9	–	3	–	0
Fordham		–		3	–	1	–	0
Cornell		–		7	–	3	–	0
Penn		–		8	–	3	–	2
Brown		–		7	–	3	–	1
New Hampshire		–		4	–	2	–	0
Vermont		–		5	–	3	–	0
Tufts		–		7	–	4	–	0
Bucknell		–		6	–	4	–	0
Dickinson		–		6	–	6	–	1
Holy Cross		–		5	–	5	–	0
Syracuse		–		4	–	4	–	0
Drexel		–		3	–	3	–	0
Army		–		4	–	5	–	0
Colgate		–		4	–	5	–	0
Penn State		–		4	–	6	–	1
Franklin & Marshall		–		3	–	5	–	1
NYU		–		2	–	6	–	0
Temple		–		1	–	4	–	1
Dartmouth		–		2	–	7	–	0
Lehigh		–		2	–	9	–	0
Rutgers		–		2	–	9	–	0
Geneva		–		0	–	3	–	0

The 1899 Cornell Big Red football team was an American football team that represented Cornell University during the 1899 college football season. In their first season under head coach Percy Haughton, the Big Red compiled a 7–3 record and outscored all opponents by a combined total of 134 to 52. Three Cornell players received honors on the 1899 College Football All-America Team: quarterback George H. Young (Outing-2, New York Tribune-2); halfback George B. Walbridge (Outing-2); and tackle Edward R. Alexander (Camp-3, New York Tribune-2; Leslie's Weekly-2).

== Schedule ==
Date	Opponent	Site	Result	Attendance	Source
September 23	vs. Colgate	Richfield Springs, NY (rivalry)	W 42–0		
September 27	Syracuse	Percy Field; Ithaca, NY	W 17–0		
September 30	Hamilton	Percy Field; Ithaca, NY	W 12–0	500	
October 7	Williams	Percy Field; Ithaca, NY	W 12–0		
October 14	at Chicago	Marshall Field; Chicago, IL	L 6–17	6,000	
October 21	Lehigh	Percy Field; Ithaca, NY	W 6–0		
October 28	Princeton	Percy Field; Ithaca, NY	W 5–0	8,000	
November 7	at Columbia	Manhattan Field; New York, NY (rivalry)	W 29–0	25,000	
November 11	Lafayette	Percy Field; Ithaca, NY	L 5–6	500	
November 30	at Penn	Franklin Field; Philadelphia, PA (rivalry)	L 0–29	25,000	
