= 1899 Carlisle Indians football team =

American college football season

1899 Carlisle Indians football
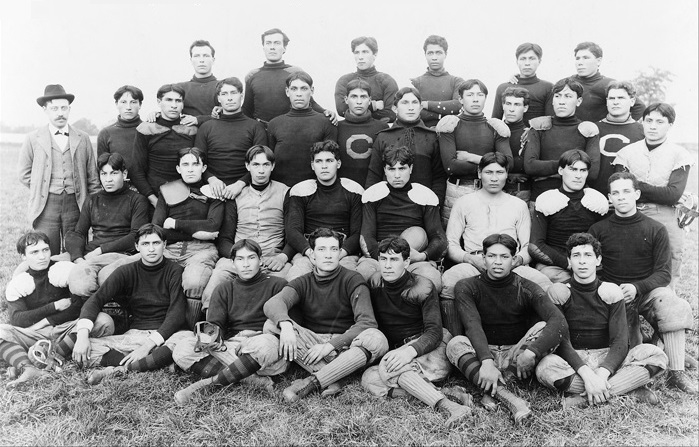
- Conference: Independent
- Record: 9–2
- Head coach: Pop Warner (1st season)
- Captain: Martin Wheelock
- Home stadium: Indian Field

1899 Eastern college football independents records
	Conf.			Overall
Team	W	L	T	W		L		T
Harvard		–		10	–	0	–	1
Lafayette		–		12	–	1	–	0
Princeton		–		12	–	1	–	0
Buffalo		–		7	–	1	–	0
Boston College		–		8	–	1	–	1
Carlisle		–		9	–	2	–	0
Swarthmore		–		8	–	1	–	2
Washington & Jefferson		–		9	–	2	–	1
Wesleyan		–		7	–	2	–	0
Pittsburgh College		–		2	–	0	–	2
Villanova		–		7	–	2	–	1
Yale		–		7	–	2	–	1
Western Univ. of Penn.		–		3	–	1	–	1
Columbia		–		9	–	3	–	0
Fordham		–		3	–	1	–	0
Cornell		–		7	–	3	–	0
Penn		–		8	–	3	–	2
Brown		–		7	–	3	–	1
New Hampshire		–		4	–	2	–	0
Vermont		–		5	–	3	–	0
Tufts		–		7	–	4	–	0
Bucknell		–		6	–	4	–	0
Dickinson		–		6	–	6	–	1
Holy Cross		–		5	–	5	–	0
Syracuse		–		4	–	4	–	0
Drexel		–		3	–	3	–	0
Army		–		4	–	5	–	0
Colgate		–		4	–	5	–	0
Penn State		–		4	–	6	–	1
Franklin & Marshall		–		3	–	5	–	1
NYU		–		2	–	6	–	0
Temple		–		1	–	4	–	1
Dartmouth		–		2	–	7	–	0
Lehigh		–		2	–	9	–	0
Rutgers		–		2	–	9	–	0
Geneva		–		0	–	3	–	0

The 1899 Carlisle Indians football team represented the Carlisle Indian Industrial School as an independent during the 1899 college football season. Led by first-year head coach Pop Warner, the Indians compiled a record of 9–2 and outscored opponents 383 to 46.

Frank Hudson was the quarterback and drop-kicker for the 1899 Carlisle Indian team. In a 22–10 loss to Harvard, Hudson's kicking was again a featured attraction. The New York Times reported: "And now came the feature of the game, for which everybody had been waiting. The Indians advanced the ball to Harvard's thirty-five-yard line, when Hudson dropped back for a goal from the field. A second later and the pigskin went straight through the goal posts, and everybody was digging his neighbors' ribs and saying, 'I told you so.'" For the first time, Carlisle defeated one of the "Big Four" of college football, defeating Penn by a score of 16 to 5.

The 1899 Carlisle team drew further acclaim after defeating Columbia, 45–0, in a Thanksgiving Day game played at Manhattan Field near the Polo Grounds in New York. Hudson drop-kicked four goals from touchdown and one field goal in the victory over Columbia. The New York Times cited Hudson's use of the drop kick technique as one of the features of the game:

"The other novelty was the way in which Hudson kicked goals. Instead of making a kick from a placed ball held by one of his eleven he chose to make all his tries for a goal by a drop kick, and he succeeded in most of his efforts. It was a new feature for a match game, though frequently tried in practice."

With 10,000 fans in attendance, Isaac Seneca was the star of the game, having two runs of 30 yards and another of 40 yards. A press account of the game said: "The Indians were in prime physical condition and bore through the Columbia line and skirted the ends at will. At least eight times the Carlisle backs got around the ends for runs of thirty to sixty yards. Most of these runs were made by Seneca and Miller."

For just the second time in history, an eastern team traveled to the Pacific coast. Carlisle defeated the California Golden Bears on December 25 in San Francisco by a score of 2–0. The news reported the contest as the first matchup of East and West, but was pre-dated by the 1894 Chicago vs. Stanford football game. Like the Chicago vs. Stanford game before it, the Carlisle vs. California game foreshadows the first bowl game, the 1902 Rose Bowl.

At the end of the 1899 season, Seneca was elected as captain of the 1900 team, though he opted to play professional football rather than return in 1900. Seneca was also honored by being named a first-team All-American—the first Carlisle player and the first American Indian to be so honored.

With its only two losses having come to Harvard and Princeton (ranked first and second in the country), the 1899 Carlisle team was ranked no. 4 in the country by Walter Camp.

== Schedule ==
Date	Time	Opponent	Site	Result	Attendance	Source
September 23		at Gettysburg	Gettysburg, PA	W 21–0		
September 30		Susquehanna	Indian Field; Carlisle, PA	W 56–0		
October 14		at Penn	Franklin Field; Philadelphia, PA	W 16–5	15,000	
October 21		vs. Dickinson	Carlisle, PA	W 16–7		
October 28		at Harvard	Soldiers' Field; Boston, MA	L 10–22	13,000	
November 4		at Hamilton	Genesee Park; Utica, NY	W 32–0		
November 11	2:40 p.m.	vs. Princeton	Manhattan Field; New York, NY	L 0–12	8,000	
November 25		Oberlin	Carlisle, PA	W 81–0		
November 30		at Columbia	Manhattan Field; New York, NY	W 45–0		
December 25		vs. California	Richmond Field; San Francisco, CA	W 2–0		
January 1	5:30 p.m.	at Phoenix Indians	Phoenix Park; Phoenix, Arizona Territory	W 86–6		

== See also ==
- 1899 College Football All-America Team
