= 1899 Harvard Crimson football team =

American college football season

1899 Harvard Crimson football

National champion (Helms, Houlgate, and NCF)
- Conference: Independent
- Record: 10–0–1
- Head coach: Benjamin Dibblee (1st season)
- Home stadium: Soldiers' Field

1899 Eastern college football independents records
	Conf.			Overall
Team	W	L	T	W		L		T
Harvard		–		10	–	0	–	1
Lafayette		–		12	–	1	–	0
Princeton		–		12	–	1	–	0
Buffalo		–		7	–	1	–	0
Boston College		–		8	–	1	–	1
Carlisle		–		9	–	2	–	0
Swarthmore		–		8	–	1	–	2
Washington & Jefferson		–		9	–	2	–	1
Wesleyan		–		7	–	2	–	0
Pittsburgh College		–		2	–	0	–	2
Villanova		–		7	–	2	–	1
Yale		–		7	–	2	–	1
Western Univ. of Penn.		–		3	–	1	–	1
Columbia		–		9	–	3	–	0
Fordham		–		3	–	1	–	0
Cornell		–		7	–	3	–	0
Penn		–		8	–	3	–	2
Brown		–		7	–	3	–	1
New Hampshire		–		4	–	2	–	0
Vermont		–		5	–	3	–	0
Tufts		–		7	–	4	–	0
Bucknell		–		6	–	4	–	0
Dickinson		–		6	–	6	–	1
Holy Cross		–		5	–	5	–	0
Syracuse		–		4	–	4	–	0
Drexel		–		3	–	3	–	0
Army		–		4	–	5	–	0
Colgate		–		4	–	5	–	0
Penn State		–		4	–	6	–	1
Franklin & Marshall		–		3	–	5	–	1
NYU		–		2	–	6	–	0
Temple		–		1	–	4	–	1
Dartmouth		–		2	–	7	–	0
Lehigh		–		2	–	9	–	0
Rutgers		–		2	–	9	–	0
Geneva		–		0	–	3	–	0

The 1899 Harvard Crimson football team was an American football team that represented Harvard University as an independent during the 1899 college football season. In its first season under head coach Benjamin Dibblee, the Crimson compiled a 10–0–1 record, shut out 10 of 11 opponents, and outscored all opponents by a total of 210 to 10.

There was no contemporaneous system in 1899 for determining a national champion. However, Harvard was retroactively named as the national champion by the Helms Athletic Foundation, Houlgate System, and National Championship Foundation. Princeton compiled a 12–1 record and was named the national champion by two other selectors.

Two Harvard players were consensus first-team selections on the 1899 All-American football team: quarterback Charles Dudley Daly and end Dave Campbell. Other players included halfback George A. Sawin, end John Hallowell, center Francis Lowell Burnett, guard William A. M. Burden Sr., and tackle Malcolm Donald.

== Schedule ==
Date	Time	Opponent	Site	Result	Attendance	Source
September 30	3:00 p.m.	Williams	Soldiers' Field; Boston, MA	W 29–0		
October 4		Bowdoin	Soldiers' Field; Boston, MA	W 13–0		
October 7	3:00 p.m.	Wesleyan	Soldiers' Field; Boston, MA	W 20–0	1,500	
October 11		Amherst	Soldiers' Field; Boston, MA	W 41–0		
October 14		at Army	The Plain; West Point, NY	W 18–0		
October 18		Bates	Soldiers' Field; Boston, MA	W 29–0		
October 21	3:00 p.m.	Brown	Soldiers' Field; Boston, MA	W 11–0	7,000–8,000	
October 28		Carlisle	Soldiers' Field; Boston, MA	W 22–10	13,000	
November 4		at Penn	Franklin Field; Philadelphia, PA (rivalry)	W 16–0	> 30,000	
November 11	3:00 p.m.	Dartmouth	Soldiers' Field; Boston, MA (rivalry)	W 11–0	3,000	
November 18		Yale	Soldiers' Field; Boston, MA (rivalry)	T 0–0	35,000	

== Roster ==
- Charles A. Barnard, G
- Biagden, T
- Walter Boal, G
- William A. M. Burden Sr., G
- Francis Lowell Burnett, C
- Dave Campbell, E
- Cooper, E
- Charles Dudley Daly, QB
- Devens, FB
- Malcolm Donald, T
- Eaton, T
- Ellis, HB
- Fincke, QB
- Frainer, G
- Gierasch, HB
- E. Gray, E
- Greene, C
- John Hallowell, E
- Hollingsworth, G
- Hurley, HB
- Kasson, C
- Kendall, HB
- J. Lawrence, T
- E. Lewis, T
- L. Motley, E
- Parker, HB
- Bill Reid, FB
- A. W. Ristine, E
- A. R. Sargent, G
- C. Sargent, C
- George A. Sawin, T
- Warren, HB
