= 1899 Princeton Tigers football team =

American college football season

1899 Princeton Tigers football

National champion (Billingsley, Davis)
- Conference: Independent
- Record: 12–1
- Head coach: None
- Captain: Big Bill Edwards
- Home stadium: Osborne Field

1899 Eastern college football independents records
	Conf.			Overall
Team	W	L	T	W		L		T
Harvard		–		10	–	0	–	1
Lafayette		–		12	–	1	–	0
Princeton		–		12	–	1	–	0
Buffalo		–		7	–	1	–	0
Boston College		–		8	–	1	–	1
Carlisle		–		9	–	2	–	0
Swarthmore		–		8	–	1	–	2
Washington & Jefferson		–		9	–	2	–	1
Wesleyan		–		7	–	2	–	0
Pittsburgh College		–		2	–	0	–	2
Villanova		–		7	–	2	–	1
Yale		–		7	–	2	–	1
Western Univ. of Penn.		–		3	–	1	–	1
Columbia		–		9	–	3	–	0
Fordham		–		3	–	1	–	0
Cornell		–		7	–	3	–	0
Penn		–		8	–	3	–	2
Brown		–		7	–	3	–	1
New Hampshire		–		4	–	2	–	0
Vermont		–		5	–	3	–	0
Tufts		–		7	–	4	–	0
Bucknell		–		6	–	4	–	0
Dickinson		–		6	–	6	–	1
Holy Cross		–		5	–	5	–	0
Syracuse		–		4	–	4	–	0
Drexel		–		3	–	3	–	0
Army		–		4	–	5	–	0
Colgate		–		4	–	5	–	0
Penn State		–		4	–	6	–	1
Franklin & Marshall		–		3	–	5	–	1
NYU		–		2	–	6	–	0
Temple		–		1	–	4	–	1
Dartmouth		–		2	–	7	–	0
Lehigh		–		2	–	9	–	0
Rutgers		–		2	–	9	–	0
Geneva		–		0	–	3	–	0

The 1899 Princeton Tigers football team represented Princeton University in the 1899 college football season. The team finished with a 12–1 record and was retroactively named as the national champion by the Billingsley Report and Parke H. Davis. Harvard compiled a 10–0–1 record and was selected as the national champion by three other selectors. They outscored their opponents 185 to 21.

== Schedule ==
Date	Time	Opponent	Site	Result	Attendance	Source
October 6		at Maryland Athletic Club	Union Park; Baltimore, MD	W 28–0	1,000	
October 7		at Navy	Worden Field; Annapolis, MD	W 5–0		
October 11		Lafayette	Osborne Field; Princeton, NJ	W 12–0	1,500	
October 14	2:45 p.m.	at Columbia	Manhattan Field; New York, NY	W 11–0		
October 18	3:20 p.m.	Penn State	Osborne Field; Princeton, NJ	W 12–0		
October 21		at Army	The Plain; West Point, NY	W 23–0		
October 25		Lehigh	Osborne Field; Princeton, NJ	W 17–0		
October 28		at Cornell	Percy Field; Ithaca, NY	L 0–5	8,000	
November 4	3:15 p.m.	Brown	Osborne Field; Princeton, NJ	W 18–6	3,500	
November 8	2:00 p.m.	North Carolina	Osborne Field; Princeton, NJ	W 30–0		
November 11	2:40 p.m.	vs. Carlisle	Manhattan Field; New York, NY	W 12–0	8,000	
November 18	3:00 p.m.	Washington & Jefferson	Osborne Field; Princeton, NJ	W 6–0		
November 25		at Yale	Yale Field; New Haven, CT (rivalry)	W 11–10		
