= 1899 Columbia Blue and White football team =

American college football season

1899 Columbia Blue and White football
- Conference: Independent
- Record: 9–3
- Head coach: George Sanford (1st season)
- Captain: Robert P. Wilson
- Home stadium: Manhattan Field

1899 Eastern college football independents records
	Conf.			Overall
Team	W	L	T	W		L		T
Harvard		–		10	–	0	–	1
Lafayette		–		12	–	1	–	0
Princeton		–		12	–	1	–	0
Buffalo		–		7	–	1	–	0
Boston College		–		8	–	1	–	1
Carlisle		–		9	–	2	–	0
Swarthmore		–		8	–	1	–	2
Washington & Jefferson		–		9	–	2	–	1
Wesleyan		–		7	–	2	–	0
Pittsburgh College		–		2	–	0	–	2
Villanova		–		7	–	2	–	1
Yale		–		7	–	2	–	1
Western Univ. of Penn.		–		3	–	1	–	1
Columbia		–		9	–	3	–	0
Fordham		–		3	–	1	–	0
Cornell		–		7	–	3	–	0
Penn		–		8	–	3	–	2
Brown		–		7	–	3	–	1
New Hampshire		–		4	–	2	–	0
Vermont		–		5	–	3	–	0
Tufts		–		7	–	4	–	0
Bucknell		–		6	–	4	–	0
Dickinson		–		6	–	6	–	1
Holy Cross		–		5	–	5	–	0
Syracuse		–		4	–	4	–	0
Drexel		–		3	–	3	–	0
Army		–		4	–	5	–	0
Colgate		–		4	–	5	–	0
Penn State		–		4	–	6	–	1
Franklin & Marshall		–		3	–	5	–	1
NYU		–		2	–	6	–	0
Temple		–		1	–	4	–	1
Dartmouth		–		2	–	7	–	0
Lehigh		–		2	–	9	–	0
Rutgers		–		2	–	9	–	0
Geneva		–		0	–	3	–	0

The 1899 Columbia Blue and White football team was an American football team that represented Columbia University as an independent during the 1899 college football season. In its first season under head coach George Sanford, the team compiled a 9–3 record and outscored opponents by a total of 224 to 91, including eight shutouts. The 1899 season marked Columbia's return to the sport after not participating in intercollegiate football from 1892 to 1898. Robert P. Wilson was the team captain.

On October 28, 1899, Columbia defeated Yale, 5–0. The result was described by The New York Times as "one of the most disastrous defeats Yale has ever experienced in her athletic history." Columbia's freshman back Harold Weekes scored the game's only points on a long touchdown run in the middle of the second half.

Three Columbia received honors on the 1899 All-America team: center Jack Wright (Walter Camp second team; New York Sun first team); Weekes (Walter Camp second team); and back Bill Morley (Outing Magazine second team).

The team played home games at Manhattan Field, also known as Polo Grounds II, in Upper Manhattan in New York City.

Columbia's sports teams were commonly called the "Blue and White" in this era, but had no official nickname. The name "Lions" was adopted until 1910.

== Schedule ==
Date	Time	Opponent	Site	Result	Attendance	Source
September 23		at Walton	Margaretville, NY	W 30–6		
October 3		at Rutgers	Neilson Field; New Brunswick, NJ	W 26–0		
October 7		at Union (NY)	Ridgefield; Albany, NY	W 21–0	600	
October 14	2:45 p.m.	Princeton	Manhattan Field; New York, NY	L 0–11		
October 18		NYU	Manhattan Field; New York, NY	W 40–0		
October 21		Amherst	Manhattan Field; New York, NY	W 18–0	500	
October 28		Yale	Manhattan Field; New York, NY	W 5–0	5,000	
November 1		at Stevens	St. George's Cricket Club grounds; Hoboken, NJ	W 46–0		
November 7		Cornell	Manhattan Field; New York, NY (rivalry)	L 0–29	25,000	
November 11		at Army	The Plain; West Point, NY	W 16–0		
November 18		Dartmouth	Manhattan Field; New York, NY	W 22–0	1,000–1,500	
November 30		Carlisle	Manhattan Field; New York, NY	L 0–45	10,000	
