= 1899 Lafayette football team =

American college football season

1899 Lafayette football
- Conference: Independent
- Record: 12–1
- Head coach: Samuel B. Newton (1st season)
- Captain: Edward Bray
- Home stadium: March Field

1899 Eastern college football independents records
	Conf.			Overall
Team	W	L	T	W		L		T
Harvard		–		10	–	0	–	1
Lafayette		–		12	–	1	–	0
Princeton		–		12	–	1	–	0
Buffalo		–		7	–	1	–	0
Boston College		–		8	–	1	–	1
Carlisle		–		9	–	2	–	0
Swarthmore		–		8	–	1	–	2
Washington & Jefferson		–		9	–	2	–	1
Wesleyan		–		7	–	2	–	0
Pittsburgh College		–		2	–	0	–	2
Villanova		–		7	–	2	–	1
Yale		–		7	–	2	–	1
Western Univ. of Penn.		–		3	–	1	–	1
Columbia		–		9	–	3	–	0
Fordham		–		3	–	1	–	0
Cornell		–		7	–	3	–	0
Penn		–		8	–	3	–	2
Brown		–		7	–	3	–	1
New Hampshire		–		4	–	2	–	0
Vermont		–		5	–	3	–	0
Tufts		–		7	–	4	–	0
Bucknell		–		6	–	4	–	0
Dickinson		–		6	–	6	–	1
Holy Cross		–		5	–	5	–	0
Syracuse		–		4	–	4	–	0
Drexel		–		3	–	3	–	0
Army		–		4	–	5	–	0
Colgate		–		4	–	5	–	0
Penn State		–		4	–	6	–	1
Franklin & Marshall		–		3	–	5	–	1
NYU		–		2	–	6	–	0
Temple		–		1	–	4	–	1
Dartmouth		–		2	–	7	–	0
Lehigh		–		2	–	9	–	0
Rutgers		–		2	–	9	–	0
Geneva		–		0	–	3	–	0

The 1899 Lafayette football team was an American football team that represented Lafayette College as an independent during the 1899 college football season. In its first year under head coach Samuel B. Newton, Lafayette compiled a 12–1 record, shut out 10 opponents, and outscored all opponents by a total of 253 to 23. Significant games included victories over Penn (6–0), Lehigh (17–0 and 35–0), and Cornell (6–5), and its sole loss coming against co-national champion Princeton (0–12).

Two Lafayette players received recognition on the 1899 All-America football team. They are: fullback Edward G. Bray (Outing magazine, 2nd team; Charles E. Patterson, 1st team); and guard H. E. Trout (Walter Camp, 3rd team).

== Schedule ==
Date	Opponent	Site	Result	Attendance	Source
September 30	Ursinus	Lafayette Field; Easton, PA	W 34–0		
October 4	Villanova	Lafayette Field; Easton, PA	W 13–0		
October 7	at Swarthmore	Swarthmore, PA	W 16–6		
October 11	at Princeton	Osborne Field; Princeton, NJ	L 0–12	1,500	
October 14	Rutgers	Lafayette Field; Easton, PA	W 57–0		
October 21	at Penn	Franklin Field; Philadelphia, PA	W 6–0	12,000	
October 28	at Navy	Worden Field; Annapolis, MD	W 5–0		
November 4	Lehigh	Lafayette Field; Easton, PA (rivalry)	W 17–0	4,000	
November 7	at Newark A.C.	Newark, NJ	W 16–0	3,000	
November 11	at Cornell	Percy Field; Ithaca, NY	W 6–5	500	
November 18	Bucknell	Lafayette Field; Easton, PA	W 12–0		
November 25	at Lehigh	Bethlehem, PA	W 35–0	4,000	
November 30	Dickinson	Lafayette Field; Easton, PA	W 36–0	3,500	

== Players ==
The following players were regulars on the 1899 Lafayette football team.

=== Backs ===
- Edward G. "Ned" Bray - fullback, 5 feet, 11 inches, 174 pounds
- Walter Hubley - quarterback, 5 feet, 8 inches, 155 pounds
- Ross G. Knight - left halfback, 5 feet, 11 inches, 160 pounds
- J. E. Platt - right halfback, 5 feet, 9 inches, 167 pounds

=== Linemen ===
- Charles Schmidt - right guard, 5 feet, 10 inches, 182 pounds
- Ned Ely - left end, 6 feet, 170 pounds
- John Chalmers - left tackle and captain, 5 feet, 11 inches, 170 pounds
- W. E. Bachman - center, 6 feet, 191 pounds
- D. R. Brown - right end, 6 feet, 172 pounds
- Joe Wiedenmayer - right tackle, 6 feet, 177 pounds
- H. E. Trout - left guard, 5 feet, 11 inches, 190 pounds
- L. P. Butler - guard
- R. A. Freed - tackle
