= 1899 Penn Quakers football team =

American college football season

1899 Penn Quakers football
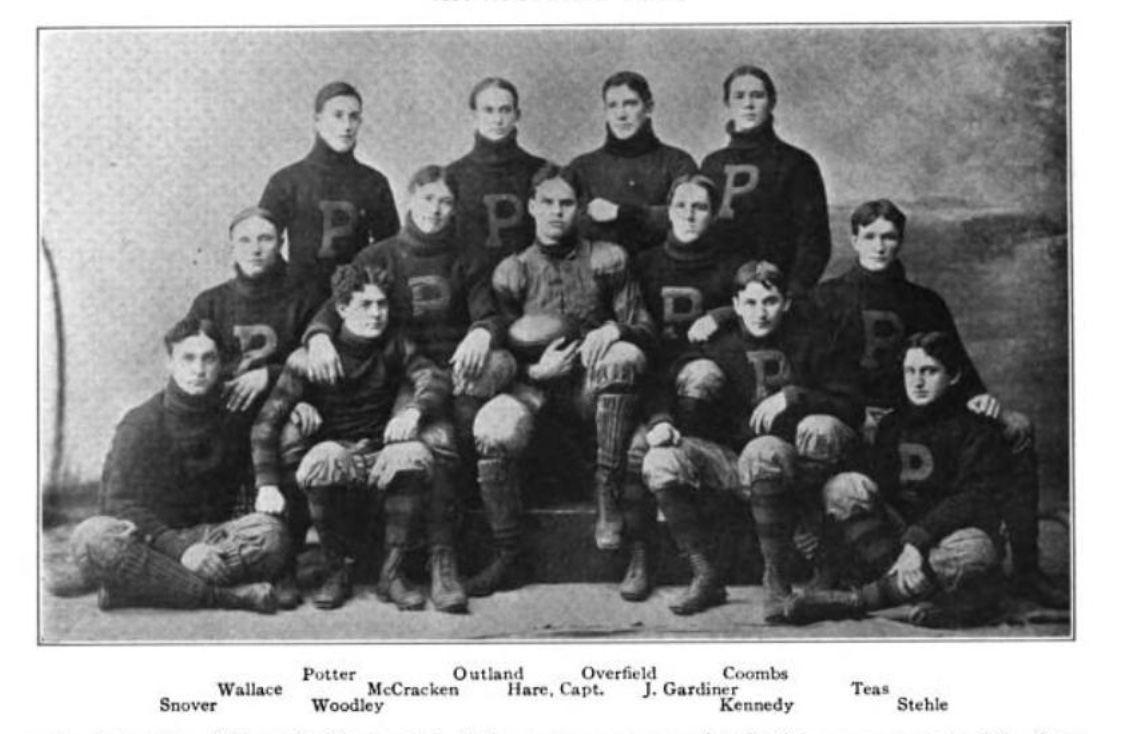
- Conference: Independent
- Record: 8–3–2
- Head coach: George Washington Woodruff (8th season)
- Captain: Truxtun Hare
- Home stadium: Franklin Field

1899 Eastern college football independents records
	Conf.			Overall
Team	W	L	T	W		L		T
Harvard		–		10	–	0	–	1
Lafayette		–		12	–	1	–	0
Princeton		–		12	–	1	–	0
Buffalo		–		7	–	1	–	0
Boston College		–		8	–	1	–	1
Carlisle		–		9	–	2	–	0
Swarthmore		–		8	–	1	–	2
Washington & Jefferson		–		9	–	2	–	1
Wesleyan		–		7	–	2	–	0
Pittsburgh College		–		2	–	0	–	2
Villanova		–		7	–	2	–	1
Yale		–		7	–	2	–	1
Western Univ. of Penn.		–		3	–	1	–	1
Columbia		–		9	–	3	–	0
Fordham		–		3	–	1	–	0
Cornell		–		7	–	3	–	0
Penn		–		8	–	3	–	2
Brown		–		7	–	3	–	1
New Hampshire		–		4	–	2	–	0
Vermont		–		5	–	3	–	0
Tufts		–		7	–	4	–	0
Bucknell		–		6	–	4	–	0
Dickinson		–		6	–	6	–	1
Holy Cross		–		5	–	5	–	0
Syracuse		–		4	–	4	–	0
Drexel		–		3	–	3	–	0
Army		–		4	–	5	–	0
Colgate		–		4	–	5	–	0
Penn State		–		4	–	6	–	1
Franklin & Marshall		–		3	–	5	–	1
NYU		–		2	–	6	–	0
Temple		–		1	–	4	–	1
Dartmouth		–		2	–	7	–	0
Lehigh		–		2	–	9	–	0
Rutgers		–		2	–	9	–	0
Geneva		–		0	–	3	–	0

The 1899 Penn Quakers football team represented the University of Pennsylvania as an independent during the 1899 college football season. Led by eighth-year head coach George Washington Woodruff, the Quakers compiled a record of 8–3–2. Penn played home games at Franklin Field in Philadelphia.

== Schedule ==
Date	Time	Opponent	Site	Result	Attendance	Source
September 27		Franklin & Marshall	Franklin Field; Philadelphia, PA	W 48–0		
September 30		Lehigh	Franklin Field; Philadelphia, PA	W 20–0		
October 4		Bucknell	Franklin Field; Philadelphia, PA	W 47–10		
October 7		at Brown	Providence, RI	T 6–6	1,000–2,000	
October 11		Virginia	Franklin Field; Philadelphia, PA	W 33–6		
October 14		Carlisle	Franklin Field; Philadelphia, PA	L 5–16	15,000	
October 18	3:00 p.m.	Wesleyan	Franklin Field; Philadelphia, PA	W 17–6	2,000	
October 21		Lafayette	Franklin Field; Philadelphia, PA	L 0–6		
October 28		Chicago	Franklin Field; Philadelphia, PA	T 5–5	8,000	
November 4		Harvard	Franklin Field; Philadelphia, PA (rivalry)	L 0–16	> 30,000	
November 11		Michigan	Franklin Field; Philadelphia, PA	W 11–10		
November 17		Penn State	Franklin Field; Philadelphia, PA	W 47–0		
November 30		Cornell	Franklin Field; Philadelphia, PA (rivalry)	W 29–0	25,000	
