= 1899 college football season =

American college football season

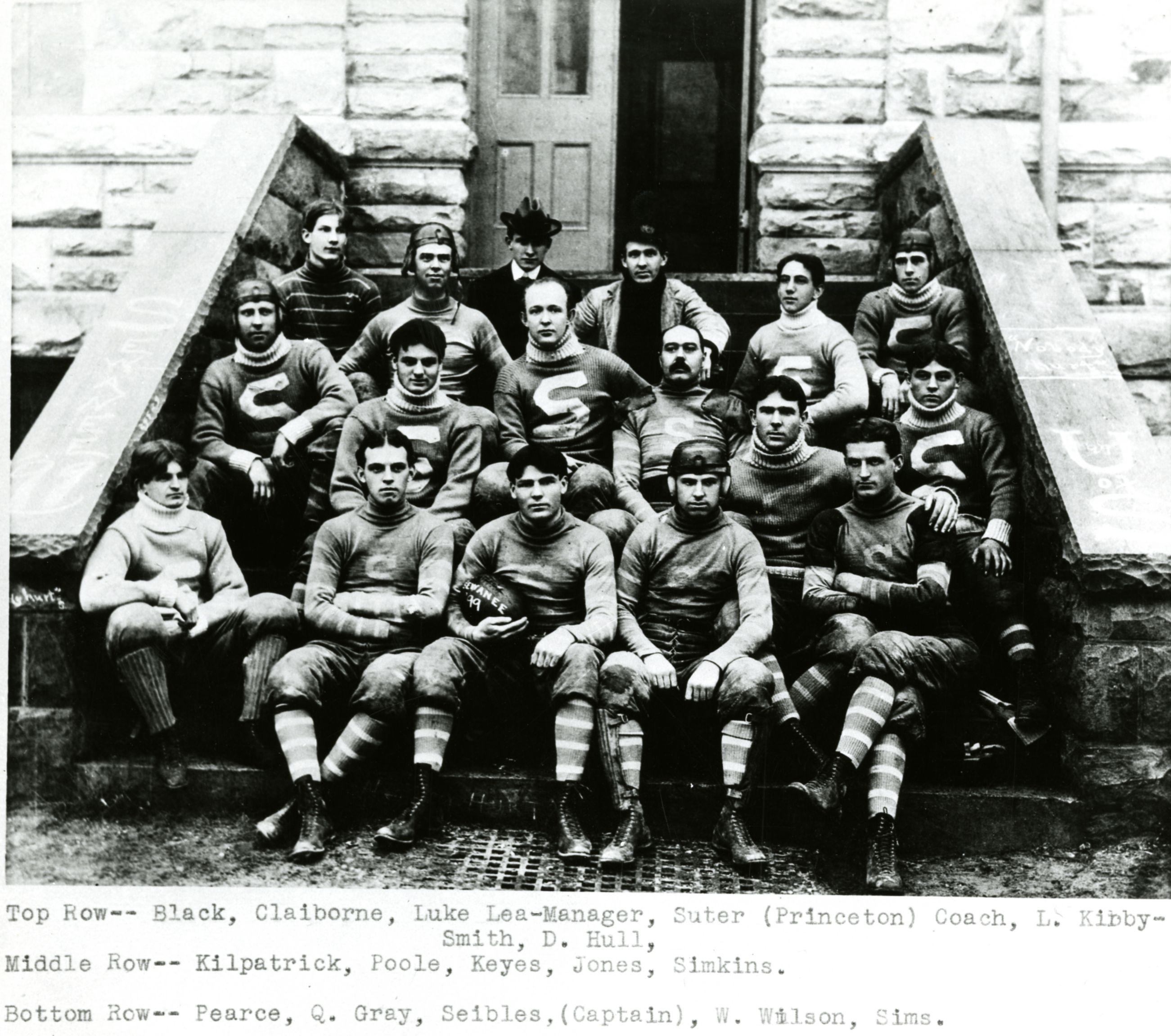
- 1899 Sewanee Tigers
- Total No. of teams: 41
- Regular season: September 9 to December 27
- Champion(s): Harvard; Princeton

The 1899 college football season had no clear-cut champion, with the Official NCAA Division I Football Records Book listing Harvard and Princeton as having been selected national champions.

Chicago, Kansas, and Sewanee went undefeated. With just 13 players, the Sewanee team, known as the "Iron Men", had a six-day road trip with five shutout wins over Texas A&M; Texas; Tulane; LSU; and Ole Miss. Sportswriter Grantland Rice called the group "the most durable football team I ever saw."

== Football in 1899 ==
American football in 1899 remained a variant of rugby, played with a virtually identical ball and sharing a fundamental prohibition of use of the forward pass to advance the ball. The game was played on a field 110 yards long and 53-1/3 yards wide, marked off with white lines parallel to the goal lines every five yards.

The game was played by teams of 11 players, aligned typically with 7 "rushers" or "forwards" at the line of scrimmage, and four "backs" behind them. These were a quarterback immediately behind the line, two halfbacks stationed a couple yards behind him, and a fullback or "goal tend," who stood deep behind the halfbacks. Duration of the game was 70 minutes, divided into two 35-minute halves, which could be shortened by mutual consent, with play regulated by three officials.

Teams were allowed three downs to either advance the ball 5 yards or retreat towards their own goal 20 yards via running or lateral pass, otherwise being forced to surrender the ball to the defenders at the last spot. All tackles had to be made above the knees. A pair of light sticks with a 5-yard length of stout cord or chain were used to measure the line-of-gain for a new first down. As with the modern game, teams typically did not turn over the ball on downs, since "if the prospects of completing the five-yard gain appear small, it is so manifestly politic to kick the ball as far as possible down the field..."

A dropkick or place-held field goal over the 10-foot crossbar and through the goalposts mounted at the goal line counted 5 points, as did a touchdown. Safeties counted as 2 points, as the case remains today.

The possibility of an extra (6th) point followed each touchdown, with the scoring team given the option of a place-kick from any point on the field parallel to where the touchdown crossed the goal line; or a "punt out," in which the scoring team punted the ball from the end zone to a fair-catching teammate, which (if successfully executed) would provide the spot for a drop kick for the extra point. The extra-point placekick was executed with the holder elevating the ball slightly above the ground as the defenders lined up at the goal line. The play began when the ball was touched to the ground, with a mad rush ensuing to block the kick.

Players played both offense and defense without substitution; those being replaced due to exhaustion or injury were forbidden from returning for the duration to the game. Coaching from the sideline was expressly prohibited.

== Conference and program changes ==
=== Conference establishments ===
- One conference played its final season in 1899:
  - Maryland Intercollegiate Football Association – active since 1894

=== Membership changes ===
| School | 1898 Conference | 1899 Conference |
|---|---|---|
| Arizona Varsity | Program Established | Independent |
| Baylor football | Program Established | Independent |
| Davidson Wildcats | Independent | SIAA |
| Furman Hornets | Independent | SIAA |
| Northern Illinois State Normal football | Program Established | Independent |

== Conference standings ==
=== Major conference standings ===
1899 Colorado Football Association standings
| | Conf. | | | | | Overall |
| Team | W | | L | | T | W | | L | | T |
|---|---|---|---|---|---|---|---|---|---|---|
| Colorado College $ | 2 | – | 0 | – | 0 | 3 | – | 2 | – | 1 |
| Colorado | 2 | – | 1 | – | 0 | 7 | – | 2 | – | 0 |
| Colorado Mines | 1 | – | 2 | – | 0 | 2 | – | 3 | – | 0 |
| Colorado Agricultural | 0 | – | 2 | – | 0 | 0 | – | 2 | – | 1 |
$ – Conference champion

1899 Southern Intercollegiate Athletic Association football standings
| | Conf. | | | | | Overall |
| Team | W | | L | | T | W | | L | | T |
|---|---|---|---|---|---|---|---|---|---|---|
| Sewanee $ | 11 | – | 0 | – | 0 | 12 | – | 0 | – | 0 |
| Vanderbilt | 5 | – | 0 | – | 0 | 7 | – | 2 | – | 0 |
| Alabama | 1 | – | 0 | – | 0 | 3 | – | 1 | – | 0 |
| Nashville | 4 | – | 1 | – | 0 | 4 | – | 1 | – | 1 |
| Tennessee | 2 | – | 1 | – | 0 | 6 | – | 2 | – | 0 |
| Auburn | 2 | – | 1 | – | 1 | 3 | – | 1 | – | 1 |
| Texas | 3 | – | 2 | – | 0 | 6 | – | 2 | – | 0 |
| North Carolina | 1 | – | 1 | – | 0 | 7 | – | 3 | – | 0 |
| Ole Miss | 3 | – | 4 | – | 0 | 3 | – | 4 | – | 0 |
| Georgia | 2 | – | 3 | – | 1 | 2 | – | 3 | – | 1 |
| Clemson | 1 | – | 2 | – | 0 | 4 | – | 2 | – | 0 |
| Central (KY) | 1 | – | 2 | – | 0 | 1 | – | 2 | – | 0 |
| LSU | 1 | – | 3 | – | 0 | 1 | – | 4 | – | 0 |
| Kentucky State | 0 | – | 1 | – | 0 | 5 | – | 2 | – | 2 |
| SW Presbyterian | 0 | – | 1 | – | 0 | 1 | – | 1 | – | 0 |
| Cumberland (TN) | 0 | – | 3 | – | 0 | 0 | – | 3 | – | 0 |
| Georgia Tech | 0 | – | 5 | – | 0 | 0 | – | 6 | – | 0 |
| Tulane | 0 | – | 5 | – | 0 | 0 | – | 6 | – | 1 |
$ – Conference champion

1899 Triangular Football League standings
| | Conf. | | | | | Overall |
| Team | W | | L | | T | W | | L | | T |
|---|---|---|---|---|---|---|---|---|---|---|
| Wesleyan $ | 2 | – | 0 | – | 0 | 7 | – | 2 | – | 0 |
| Williams | 1 | – | 1 | – | 0 | 9 | – | 4 | – | 0 |
| Amherst | 0 | – | 2 | – | 0 | 4 | – | 7 | – | 1 |
$ – Conference champion

1899 Western Conference football standings
| | Conf. | | | | | Overall |
| Team | W | | L | | T | W | | L | | T |
|---|---|---|---|---|---|---|---|---|---|---|
| Chicago $ | 4 | – | 0 | – | 0 | 16 | – | 0 | – | 2 |
| Wisconsin | 4 | – | 1 | – | 0 | 9 | – | 2 | – | 0 |
| Northwestern | 2 | – | 2 | – | 0 | 7 | – | 6 | – | 0 |
| Michigan | 1 | – | 1 | – | 0 | 8 | – | 2 | – | 0 |
| Purdue | 1 | – | 2 | – | 0 | 4 | – | 4 | – | 1 |
| Minnesota | 0 | – | 3 | – | 0 | 6 | – | 3 | – | 2 |
| Illinois | 0 | – | 3 | – | 0 | 3 | – | 5 | – | 1 |
$ – Conference champion

=== Independents ===
1899 Eastern college football independents records
| | Conf. | | | Overall |
| Team | W | L | T | W | | L | | T |
|---|---|---|---|---|---|---|---|---|
| Harvard | | – | | 10 | – | 0 | – | 1 |
| Lafayette | | – | | 12 | – | 1 | – | 0 |
| Princeton | | – | | 12 | – | 1 | – | 0 |
| Buffalo | | – | | 7 | – | 1 | – | 0 |
| Boston College | | – | | 8 | – | 1 | – | 1 |
| Carlisle | | – | | 9 | – | 2 | – | 0 |
| Swarthmore | | – | | 8 | – | 1 | – | 2 |
| Washington & Jefferson | | – | | 9 | – | 2 | – | 1 |
| Wesleyan | | – | | 7 | – | 2 | – | 0 |
| Pittsburgh College | | – | | 2 | – | 0 | – | 2 |
| Villanova | | – | | 7 | – | 2 | – | 1 |
| Yale | | – | | 7 | – | 2 | – | 1 |
| Western Univ. of Penn. | | – | | 3 | – | 1 | – | 1 |
| Columbia | | – | | 9 | – | 3 | – | 0 |
| Fordham | | – | | 3 | – | 1 | – | 0 |
| Cornell | | – | | 7 | – | 3 | – | 0 |
| Penn | | – | | 8 | – | 3 | – | 2 |
| Brown | | – | | 7 | – | 3 | – | 1 |
| New Hampshire | | – | | 4 | – | 2 | – | 0 |
| Vermont | | – | | 5 | – | 3 | – | 0 |
| Tufts | | – | | 7 | – | 4 | – | 0 |
| Bucknell | | – | | 6 | – | 4 | – | 0 |
| Dickinson | | – | | 6 | – | 6 | – | 1 |
| Holy Cross | | – | | 5 | – | 5 | – | 0 |
| Syracuse | | – | | 4 | – | 4 | – | 0 |
| Drexel | | – | | 3 | – | 3 | – | 0 |
| Army | | – | | 4 | – | 5 | – | 0 |
| Colgate | | – | | 4 | – | 5 | – | 0 |
| Penn State | | – | | 4 | – | 6 | – | 1 |
| Frankin & Marshall | | – | | 3 | – | 5 | – | 1 |
| NYU | | – | | 2 | – | 6 | – | 0 |
| Temple | | – | | 1 | – | 4 | – | 1 |
| Dartmouth | | – | | 2 | – | 7 | – | 0 |
| Lehigh | | – | | 2 | – | 9 | – | 0 |
| Rutgers | | – | | 2 | – | 9 | – | 0 |
| Geneva | | – | | 0 | – | 3 | – | 0 |

1899 Midwestern college football independents records
| | Conf. | | | Overall |
| Team | W | L | T | W | | L | | T |
|---|---|---|---|---|---|---|---|---|
| Kansas | | – | | 10 | – | 0 | – | 0 |
| North Dakota | | – | | 6 | – | 0 | – | 0 |
| Detroit College | | – | | 5 | – | 0 | – | 0 |
| Lincoln (MO) | | – | | 1 | – | 0 | – | 0 |
| Ohio State | | – | | 9 | – | 0 | – | 1 |
| Iowa | | – | | 8 | – | 0 | – | 1 |
| Washington University | | – | | 5 | – | 1 | – | 0 |
| Missouri | | – | | 9 | – | 2 | – | 0 |
| Chicago P&S | | – | | 4 | – | 1 | – | 0 |
| Mount Union | | – | | 5 | – | 1 | – | 1 |
| Indiana | | – | | 6 | – | 2 | – | 0 |
| South Dakota Agricultural | | – | | 3 | – | 1 | – | 0 |
| Wabash | | – | | 1 | – | 0 | – | 1 |
| Cincinnati | | – | | 5 | – | 2 | – | 0 |
| Drake | | – | | 5 | – | 2 | – | 0 |
| Heidelberg | | – | | 5 | – | 2 | – | 0 |
| Buchtel | | – | | 2 | – | 1 | – | 0 |
| Doane | | – | | 2 | – | 1 | – | 0 |
| Northern Illinois State | | – | | 1 | – | 0 | – | 2 |
| Notre Dame | | – | | 6 | – | 3 | – | 1 |
| Central Michigan | | – | | 3 | – | 2 | – | 0 |
| Fairmount | | – | | 2 | – | 1 | – | 2 |
| Carthage | | – | | 3 | – | 2 | – | 1 |
| Western Reserve | | – | | 5 | – | 4 | – | 0 |
| Wittenberg | | – | | 5 | – | 4 | – | 0 |
| Iowa State | | – | | 5 | – | 4 | – | 1 |
| College of Emporia | | – | | 1 | – | 1 | – | 1 |
| Ohio | | – | | 2 | – | 2 | – | 0 |
| Rush Medical | | – | | 3 | – | 3 | – | 1 |
| Ohio Wesleyan | | – | | 5 | – | 5 | – | 0 |
| Haskell | | – | | 4 | – | 5 | – | 0 |
| Lake Forest | | – | | 4 | – | 6 | – | 2 |
| Kansas State | | – | | 2 | – | 3 | – | 0 |
| Iowa State Normal | | – | | 1 | – | 3 | – | 2 |
| Washburn | | – | | 2 | – | 5 | – | 2 |
| Butler | | – | | 1 | – | 3 | – | 0 |
| Miami (OH) | | – | | 1 | – | 5 | – | 0 |
| Nebraska | | – | | 1 | – | 7 | – | 1 |
| North Dakota Agricultural | | – | | 0 | – | 1 | – | 0 |
| Baldwin–Wallace | | – | | 0 | – | 4 | – | 0 |

1899 Southern college football independents records
| | Conf. | | | Overall |
| Team | W | L | T | W | | L | | T |
|---|---|---|---|---|---|---|---|---|
| VMI | | – | | 1 | – | 0 | – | 0 |
| VPI | | – | | 4 | – | 1 | – | 0 |
| Delaware | | – | | 6 | – | 2 | – | 0 |
| Arkansas | | – | | 3 | – | 1 | – | 1 |
| Georgetown | | – | | 5 | – | 2 | – | 1 |
| Texas A&M | | – | | 4 | – | 2 | – | 0 |
| Oklahoma | | – | | 2 | – | 1 | – | 0 |
| Baylor | | – | | 2 | – | 1 | – | 1 |
| Guilford | | – | | 2 | – | 1 | – | 1 |
| Navy | | – | | 5 | – | 3 | – | 0 |
| Virginia | | – | | 4 | – | 3 | – | 2 |
| Add-Ran | | – | | 0 | – | 0 | – | 1 |
| Richmond | | – | | 2 | – | 2 | – | 0 |
| South Carolina | | – | | 2 | – | 3 | – | 0 |
| West Virginia | | – | | 2 | – | 3 | – | 0 |
| William & Mary | | – | | 2 | – | 3 | – | 0 |
| North Carolina A&M | | – | | 1 | – | 2 | – | 2 |
| Davidson | | – | | 1 | – | 3 | – | 1 |
| Maryland | | – | | 1 | – | 4 | – | 0 |
| Marshall | | – | | 0 | – | 0 | – | 1 |

1899 Far West college football independents records
| | Conf. | | | Overall |
| Team | W | L | T | W | | L | | T |
|---|---|---|---|---|---|---|---|---|
| Montana Agricultural | | – | | 3 | – | 0 | – | 0 |
| Arizona Normal | | – | | 3 | – | 0 | – | 0 |
| New Mexico A&M | | – | | 1 | – | 0 | – | 0 |
| Utah Agricultural | | – | | 1 | – | 0 | – | 0 |
| California | | – | | 7 | – | 1 | – | 1 |
| Washington | | – | | 4 | – | 1 | – | 1 |
| Utah | | – | | 2 | – | 1 | – | 0 |
| San Jose Normal | | – | | 6 | – | 3 | – | 1 |
| Nevada State | | – | | 3 | – | 2 | – | 0 |
| Oregon Agricultural | | – | | 3 | – | 2 | – | 0 |
| Oregon | | – | | 3 | – | 2 | – | 1 |
| Arizona | | – | | 1 | – | 1 | – | 1 |
| Washington Agricultural | | – | | 1 | – | 1 | – | 0 |
| Montana | | – | | 1 | – | 2 | – | 0 |
| Idaho | | – | | 1 | – | 3 | – | 0 |
| USC | | – | | 2 | – | 3 | – | 1 |
| Stanford | | – | | 2 | – | 5 | – | 2 |
| Wyoming | | – | | 0 | – | 1 | – | 1 |
| Pacific (CA) | | – | | 0 | – | 4 | – | 0 |

=== Minor conferences ===
| Conference | Champion(s) | Record |
|---|---|---|
| Michigan Intercollegiate Athletic Association | Kalamazoo | 4–1 |

== See also ==
- 1899 College Football All-America Team
