= 1899 Gallaudet Bison football team =

American college football season

1899 Gallaudet Bison football
- Conference: Maryland Intercollegiate Football Association
- Record: 5–1 ( MIFA)
- Home stadium: Kendall Green

The 1899 Gallaudet Bison football team represented Gallaudet University, a college for deaf-mutes, as a member of the Maryland Intercollegiate Football Association (MIFA) the 1899 college football season. The team was considered one of the best outside of the "big four".

== Schedule ==
Date	Opponent	Site	Result	Attendance	Source
October 21	at Virginia	Madison Hall Field; Charlottesville, VA	W 11–5		
October 25	Central HS	Kendall Green; Washington, DC	W 30–0		
November 1	at Georgetown	Georgetown Field; Washington, DC	L 0–5		
November 7	Maryland	Kendall Green; Washington, DC	W 42–0		
November 18	at St. John's (MD)	Annapolis, MD	W 18–5		
November 30	YMCA	National Park	W 12–0	2,000	
