= 1897 Add-Ran Christian football team =

American college football season

1897 Add-Ran Christian football
- Conference: Independent
- Record: 3–1
- Head coach: Joe J. Field (1st season)

1897 Southern college football independents records
	Conf.			Overall
Team	W	L	T	W		L		T
Oklahoma		–		2	–	0	–	0
Arkansas		–		2	–	0	–	1
Navy		–		8	–	1	–	0
Virginia		–		6	–	2	–	1
Add-Ran		–		3	–	1	–	0
Washington and Lee		–		3	–	1	–	0
VPI		–		5	–	2	–	0
North Carolina		–		7	–	3	–	0
VMI		–		3	–	2	–	0
Guilford		–		2	–	1	–	0
West Virginia		–		5	–	4	–	1
Davidson		–		1	–	1	–	0
Georgia Tech		–		1	–	1	–	0
Columbian		–		4	–	5	–	1
Richmond		–		3	–	5	–	0
North Carolina A&M		–		1	–	2	–	0
Texas A&M		–		1	–	2	–	0
Delaware		–		1	–	5	–	1
William & Mary		–		0	–	1	–	0
Marshall		–		0	–	3	–	0
South Carolina		–		0	–	3	–	0

The 1897 Add-Ran Christian football team represented Add-Ran Christian University, now known as Texas Christian University (TCU), as an independent during the 1897 college football season.

== Schedule ==
Date	Time	Opponent	Site	Result	Source
October 23		at East Dallas		W 6–0	
November 3		Texas	Waco, TX (rivalry)	L 10–16	
November 13	4:00 p.m.	at Texas A&M	College Station, TX (rivalry)	W 30–6	
November 25		Fort Worth	Waco, TX	W 32–0	
