= 1897 Marshall Thundering Herd football team =

American college football season

1897 Marshall Thundering Herd football
- Conference: Independent
- Record: 0–3
- Head coach: None
- Home stadium: Central Field

1897 Southern college football independents records
| | Conf. | | | Overall |
| Team | W | L | T | W | | L | | T |
|---|---|---|---|---|---|---|---|---|
| Oklahoma | | – | | 2 | – | 0 | – | 0 |
| Arkansas | | – | | 2 | – | 0 | – | 1 |
| Navy | | – | | 8 | – | 1 | – | 0 |
| Virginia | | – | | 6 | – | 2 | – | 1 |
| Add-Ran | | – | | 3 | – | 1 | – | 0 |
| Washington and Lee | | – | | 3 | – | 1 | – | 0 |
| VPI | | – | | 5 | – | 2 | – | 0 |
| North Carolina | | – | | 7 | – | 3 | – | 0 |
| VMI | | – | | 3 | – | 2 | – | 0 |
| Guilford | | – | | 2 | – | 1 | – | 0 |
| West Virginia | | – | | 5 | – | 4 | – | 1 |
| Davidson | | – | | 1 | – | 1 | – | 0 |
| Georgia Tech | | – | | 1 | – | 1 | – | 0 |
| Columbian | | – | | 4 | – | 5 | – | 1 |
| Richmond | | – | | 3 | – | 5 | – | 0 |
| North Carolina A&M | | – | | 1 | – | 2 | – | 0 |
| Texas A&M | | – | | 1 | – | 2 | – | 0 |
| Delaware | | – | | 1 | – | 5 | – | 1 |
| William & Mary | | – | | 0 | – | 1 | – | 0 |
| Marshall | | – | | 0 | – | 3 | – | 0 |
| South Carolina | | – | | 0 | – | 3 | – | 0 |

The 1897 Marshall Thundering Herd football team represented Marshall University in the 1897 college football season. The team did not have a coach, and were outscored by their opponents 6–32 in three games.

== Schedule ==
| Date | Opponent | Site | Result |
|---|---|---|---|
| October 23 | Huntington Tigers | Central Field; Huntington, WV | L 0–14 |
| October 30 | Kingsbury High School | Central Field; Huntington, WV | L 0–4 |
| November 13 | Ironton High School^{†} | Central Field; Huntington, WV | L 6–14 |
^{†}Homecoming
