= 1897 North Carolina Tar Heels football team =

American college football season

1897 North Carolina Tar Heels football
- Conference: Independent
- Record: 7–3
- Head coach: William Ayres Reynolds (1st season)
- Captain: Arthur Belden
- Home stadium: Campus Athletic Field (I)

1897 Southern college football independents records
	Conf.			Overall
Team	W	L	T	W		L		T
Oklahoma		–		2	–	0	–	0
Arkansas		–		2	–	0	–	1
Navy		–		8	–	1	–	0
Virginia		–		6	–	2	–	1
Add-Ran		–		3	–	1	–	0
Washington and Lee		–		3	–	1	–	0
VPI		–		5	–	2	–	0
North Carolina		–		7	–	3	–	0
VMI		–		3	–	2	–	0
Guilford		–		2	–	1	–	0
West Virginia		–		5	–	4	–	1
Davidson		–		1	–	1	–	0
Georgia Tech		–		1	–	1	–	0
Columbian		–		4	–	5	–	1
Richmond		–		3	–	5	–	0
North Carolina A&M		–		1	–	2	–	0
Texas A&M		–		1	–	2	–	0
Delaware		–		1	–	5	–	1
William & Mary		–		0	–	1	–	0
Marshall		–		0	–	3	–	0
South Carolina		–		0	–	3	–	0

The 1897 North Carolina Tar Heels football team represented the University of North Carolina as an independent during the 1897 college football season. Led by first-year head coach William Ayres Reynolds, the Tar Heels compiled a record of 7–3. Arthur Belden was the team captain.

== Schedule ==
Date	Time	Opponent	Site	Result	Attendance	Source
October 2	4:00 p.m.	North Carolina A&M	Campus Athletic Field (I); Chapel Hill, NC (rivalry)	W 40–0	300	
October 9	2:05 p.m.	Guilford	Campus Athletic Field (I); Chapel Hill, NC	W 16–0		
October 21		Greensboro A.A.	Campus Athletic Field (I); Chapel Hill, NC	W 24–0		
October 25	2:00 p.m.	Clemson	Campus Athletic Field (I); Chapel Hill, NC	W 28–0	200	
October 30	3:30 p.m.	vs. VPI	Athletic Park (Danville); Danville, VA	L 0–4	500	
November 5	3:15 p.m.	at Sewanee	Hardee Field; Sewanee, TN	W 12–6		
November 6	4:00 p.m.	at Vanderbilt	Dudley Field; Nashville, TN	L 0–31		
November 8	3:00 p.m.	at Tennessee	Baldwin Park; Knoxville, TN	W 16–0		
November 9	3:30 p.m.	at Robert Bingham School	Allandale Field; Asheville, NC	W 14–0	300	
November 25	3:00 p.m.	vs. Virginia	West-End Park; Richmond, VA (South's Oldest Rivalry)	L 0–12	4,000	
