= 1897 VMI Keydets football team =

American college football season

1897 VMI Keydets football
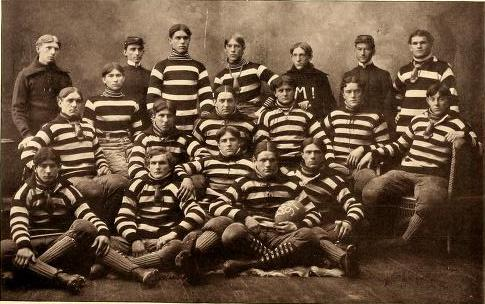
- Conference: Independent
- Record: 3–2
- Head coach: R. N. Groner (1st season)

1897 Southern college football independents records
	Conf.			Overall
Team	W	L	T	W		L		T
Oklahoma		–		2	–	0	–	0
Arkansas		–		2	–	0	–	1
Navy		–		8	–	1	–	0
Virginia		–		6	–	2	–	1
Add-Ran		–		3	–	1	–	0
Washington and Lee		–		3	–	1	–	0
VPI		–		5	–	2	–	0
North Carolina		–		7	–	3	–	0
VMI		–		3	–	2	–	0
Guilford		–		2	–	1	–	0
West Virginia		–		5	–	4	–	1
Davidson		–		1	–	1	–	0
Georgia Tech		–		1	–	1	–	0
Columbian		–		4	–	5	–	1
Richmond		–		3	–	5	–	0
North Carolina A&M		–		1	–	2	–	0
Texas A&M		–		1	–	2	–	0
Delaware		–		1	–	5	–	1
William & Mary		–		0	–	1	–	0
Marshall		–		0	–	3	–	0
South Carolina		–		0	–	3	–	0

The 1897 VMI Keydets football team represented the Virginia Military Institute (VMI) in their seventh season of organized football. The Keydets went 3–2 under first-year head coach R. N. Groner.

== Schedule ==
Date	Opponent	Site	Result	Source
October 9	Columbian	Lexington, VA	W 14–4	
October 19	at Vanderbilt	Dudley Field; Nashville, TN	L 0–12	
November 11	at Roanoke	Athletic Park; Lexington, VA	W 20–6	
November 20	Hampden–Sydney	Lexington, VA	W 42–0	
November 25	vs. St. Alban's	Lynchburg, VA	L 0–4	
