= 1897 South Carolina Gamecocks football team =

American college football season

1897 South Carolina Gamecocks football
- Conference: Independent
- Record: 0–3
- Head coach: Frederick M. Murphy (1st season)
- Captain: Lee Hagood

1897 Southern college football independents records
	Conf.			Overall
Team	W	L	T	W		L		T
Oklahoma		–		2	–	0	–	0
Arkansas		–		2	–	0	–	1
Navy		–		8	–	1	–	0
Virginia		–		6	–	2	–	1
Add-Ran		–		3	–	1	–	0
Washington and Lee		–		3	–	1	–	0
VPI		–		5	–	2	–	0
North Carolina		–		7	–	3	–	0
VMI		–		3	–	2	–	0
Guilford		–		2	–	1	–	0
West Virginia		–		5	–	4	–	1
Davidson		–		1	–	1	–	0
Georgia Tech		–		1	–	1	–	0
Columbian		–		4	–	5	–	1
Richmond		–		3	–	5	–	0
North Carolina A&M		–		1	–	2	–	0
Texas A&M		–		1	–	2	–	0
Delaware		–		1	–	5	–	1
William & Mary		–		0	–	1	–	0
Marshall		–		0	–	3	–	0
South Carolina		–		0	–	3	–	0

The 1897 South Carolina Jaguars football team represented South Carolina College—now known as the University of South Carolina–as an independent during the 1897 college football season. Led by Frederick M. Murphy in his first and only season as head coach, South Carolina compiled a record of 0–3. South Carolina did not have another winless season until 1999.

== Schedule ==
Date	Opponent	Site	Result	Source
October 23	at Charleston Y	Charleston, SC	L 0–4	
November 10	Clemson	Columbia, SC (Big Thursday)	L 6–20	
November 26	Charleston Y	Columbia, SC	L 0–6	
