= 1897 Oklahoma Sooners football team =

American college football season

1897 Oklahoma Sooners football
- Conference: Independent
- Record: 2–0
- Head coach: Vernon Louis Parrington (1st season)
- Captain: C. C. Roberts

1897 Southern college football independents records
	Conf.			Overall
Team	W	L	T	W		L		T
Oklahoma		–		2	–	0	–	0
Arkansas		–		2	–	0	–	1
Navy		–		8	–	1	–	0
Virginia		–		6	–	2	–	1
Add-Ran		–		3	–	1	–	0
Washington and Lee		–		3	–	1	–	0
VPI		–		5	–	2	–	0
North Carolina		–		7	–	3	–	0
VMI		–		3	–	2	–	0
Guilford		–		2	–	1	–	0
West Virginia		–		5	–	4	–	1
Davidson		–		1	–	1	–	0
Georgia Tech		–		1	–	1	–	0
Columbian		–		4	–	5	–	1
Richmond		–		3	–	5	–	0
North Carolina A&M		–		1	–	2	–	0
Texas A&M		–		1	–	2	–	0
Delaware		–		1	–	5	–	1
William & Mary		–		0	–	1	–	0
Marshall		–		0	–	3	–	0
South Carolina		–		0	–	3	–	0

The 1897 Oklahoma Sooners football team represented the University of Oklahoma as an independent during the 1897 college football season. In their third year of football and first year under head coach Vernon Louis Parrington, the Sooners compiled a 2–0 record, and outscored their opponents by a combined total of 33 to 8.

== Schedule ==
Date	Time	Opponent	Site	Result	Attendance	Source
November 25	3:35 p.m.	Oklahoma City Town Team	Norman, Oklahoma Territory	W 16–0	400–500	
December 31	4:00 p.m.	vs. Kingfisher	Fair grounds; Guthrie, Oklahoma Territory	W 16–8	1,000	

== Roster ==
1897 Oklahoma Sooners football
Edwin Barrow; Jasper Clapham; Harry Ford; John Hefley	Paul Mackey; Bill McCutcheon; Fred Merkle	Joe Merkle; Columbus Roberts; Ray Smith
