= 1897 West Virginia Mountaineers football team =

American college football season

1897 West Virginia Mountaineers football
- Conference: Independent
- Record: 5–4–1
- Head coach: George Krebs (1st season)
- Captain: Henry M. White

1897 Southern college football independents records
| | Conf. | | | Overall |
| Team | W | L | T | W | | L | | T |
|---|---|---|---|---|---|---|---|---|
| Oklahoma | | – | | 2 | – | 0 | – | 0 |
| Arkansas | | – | | 2 | – | 0 | – | 1 |
| Navy | | – | | 8 | – | 1 | – | 0 |
| Virginia | | – | | 6 | – | 2 | – | 1 |
| Add-Ran | | – | | 3 | – | 1 | – | 0 |
| Washington and Lee | | – | | 3 | – | 1 | – | 0 |
| VPI | | – | | 5 | – | 2 | – | 0 |
| North Carolina | | – | | 7 | – | 3 | – | 0 |
| VMI | | – | | 3 | – | 2 | – | 0 |
| Guilford | | – | | 2 | – | 1 | – | 0 |
| West Virginia | | – | | 5 | – | 4 | – | 1 |
| Davidson | | – | | 1 | – | 1 | – | 0 |
| Georgia Tech | | – | | 1 | – | 1 | – | 0 |
| Columbian | | – | | 4 | – | 5 | – | 1 |
| Richmond | | – | | 3 | – | 5 | – | 0 |
| North Carolina A&M | | – | | 1 | – | 2 | – | 0 |
| Texas A&M | | – | | 1 | – | 2 | – | 0 |
| Delaware | | – | | 1 | – | 5 | – | 1 |
| William & Mary | | – | | 0 | – | 1 | – | 0 |
| Marshall | | – | | 0 | – | 3 | – | 0 |
| South Carolina | | – | | 0 | – | 3 | – | 0 |

The 1897 West Virginia Mountaineers football team was an American football team that represented West Virginia University as an independent during the 1897 college football season. In its first and only season under head coach George Krebs, the team compiled a 5–4–1 record and outscored opponents by a total of 92 to 46. Henry M. White was the team captain.

== Schedule ==
| Date | Opponent | Site | Result | Attendance | Source |
|---|---|---|---|---|---|
| October 9 | at Pittsburgh Athletic Club | PAC Park; Pittsburgh, PA | L 0–6 | | |
| October 14 | Westminster (PA) | Morgantown, WV | W 18–0 | | |
| October 16 | vs. Marietta | Fairmont, WV | W 6–0 | | |
| October 23 | at Washington & Jefferson | College Park; Washington, PA | L 0–12 | 1,200 | |
| October 30 | at Pittsburgh College | Pittsburgh College grounds; Pittsburgh, PA | T 0–0 | | |
| November 4 | vs. Washington and Lee | Charleston, WV | W 14–0 | 3,000 | |
| November 5 | at Ohio | Athens, OH | L 0–12 | | |
| November 6 | vs. Ohio State | Parkersburg, WV | W 24–0 | | |
| November 17 | vs. Bethany (WV) | Fairmont, WV | W 30–0 | | |
| November 25 | at Latrobe Independents | Latrobe, PA | L 0–16 | | |
