= 1897 Arkansas Industrial Cardinals football team =

American college football season

1897 Arkansas Industrial Cardinals football
- Conference: Independent
- Record: 2–0–1
- Head coach: B. N. Wilson (1st season)
- Captain: Herbert Fishback

1897 Southern college football independents records
	Conf.			Overall
Team	W	L	T	W		L		T
Oklahoma		–		2	–	0	–	0
Arkansas		–		2	–	0	–	1
Navy		–		8	–	1	–	0
Virginia		–		6	–	2	–	1
Add-Ran		–		3	–	1	–	0
Washington and Lee		–		3	–	1	–	0
VPI		–		5	–	2	–	0
North Carolina		–		7	–	3	–	0
VMI		–		3	–	2	–	0
Guilford		–		2	–	1	–	0
West Virginia		–		5	–	4	–	1
Davidson		–		1	–	1	–	0
Georgia Tech		–		1	–	1	–	0
Columbian		–		4	–	5	–	1
Richmond		–		3	–	5	–	0
North Carolina A&M		–		1	–	2	–	0
Texas A&M		–		1	–	2	–	0
Delaware		–		1	–	5	–	1
William & Mary		–		0	–	1	–	0
Marshall		–		0	–	3	–	0
South Carolina		–		0	–	3	–	0

The 1897 Arkansas Industrial Cardinals football team represented the University of Arkansas during the 1897 college football season. Arkansas opened its 1897 season with its sixth game in four years against the team from Fort Smith High School. The Cardinals next competed in their third intercollegiate game, playing Drury College to a 6–6 tie. On November 20, 1897, Arkansas won its first ever intercollegiate football game against Ouachita College, a liberal arts college in Arkadelphia, Arkansas.

The captains of the 1897 team were H. Y. Fishback and E. G. Martin. John C. Futrall was the manager, and B. N. Wilson was the coach. Coach Wilson received a bachelor of science degree from Georgia School of Technology (Georgia Tech) in 1896 and joined the faculty at Arkansas Industrial as an instructor of mechanical engineering. He served as the football team's trainer in the fall of 1896 and took over as the coach in 1897.

== Schedule ==
Date	Opponent	Site	Result	Source
November 6	Fort Smith High School	Fayetteville, AR	W 12–0	
November 20	Drury	Fayetteville, AR	T 6–6	
November 25	at Ouachita	Arkadelphia, AR	W 24–0	
