= 1897 Washington and Lee Generals football team =

American college football season

1897 Washington and Lee Generals football
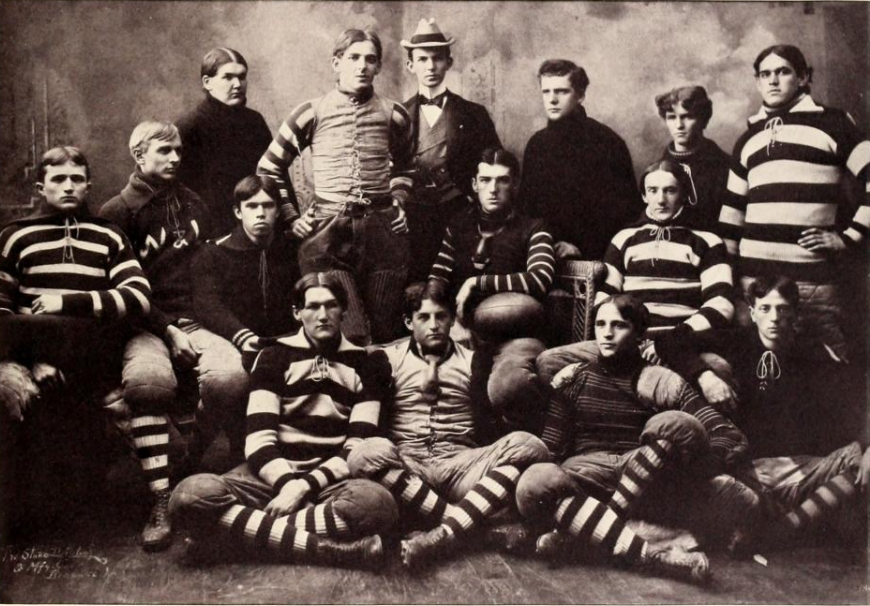
- Conference: Independent
- Record: 3–1
- Head coach: None
- Captain: D. M. Barclay

1897 Southern college football independents records
	Conf.			Overall
Team	W	L	T	W		L		T
Oklahoma		–		2	–	0	–	0
Arkansas		–		2	–	0	–	1
Navy		–		8	–	1	–	0
Virginia		–		6	–	2	–	1
Add-Ran		–		3	–	1	–	0
Washington and Lee		–		3	–	1	–	0
VPI		–		5	–	2	–	0
North Carolina		–		7	–	3	–	0
VMI		–		3	–	2	–	0
Guilford		–		2	–	1	–	0
West Virginia		–		5	–	4	–	1
Davidson		–		1	–	1	–	0
Georgia Tech		–		1	–	1	–	0
Columbian		–		4	–	5	–	1
Richmond		–		3	–	5	–	0
North Carolina A&M		–		1	–	2	–	0
Texas A&M		–		1	–	2	–	0
Delaware		–		1	–	5	–	1
William & Mary		–		0	–	1	–	0
Marshall		–		0	–	3	–	0
South Carolina		–		0	–	3	–	0

The 1897 Washington and Lee Generals football team was an American football team that represented the Washington and Lee University as an independent during the 1897 college football season. Led by captain D. M. Barclay, who played at right tackle, Washington and Lee compiled a record of 3–1. Smith Alford played at right halfback. The team had no head coach.

== Schedule ==
Date	Opponent	Site	Result	Attendance	Source
October 8	Columbian	Lexington, VA	W 10–2		
October 16	Alleghany Institute	Lexington, VA	W 30–0		
October 30	at Central (KY)	Richmond, KY	W 22–0		
November 4	vs. West Virginia	Charleston, WV	L 0–14	3,000	
