= 1897 Delaware football team =

American college football season

1897 Delaware football
- Conference: Independent
- Record: 1−5–1
- Head coach: Herbert Rice (1st season)

1897 Southern college football independents records
| | Conf. | | | Overall |
| Team | W | L | T | W | | L | | T |
|---|---|---|---|---|---|---|---|---|
| Oklahoma | | – | | 2 | – | 0 | – | 0 |
| Arkansas | | – | | 2 | – | 0 | – | 1 |
| Navy | | – | | 8 | – | 1 | – | 0 |
| Virginia | | – | | 6 | – | 2 | – | 1 |
| Add-Ran | | – | | 3 | – | 1 | – | 0 |
| Washington and Lee | | – | | 3 | – | 1 | – | 0 |
| VPI | | – | | 5 | – | 2 | – | 0 |
| North Carolina | | – | | 7 | – | 3 | – | 0 |
| VMI | | – | | 3 | – | 2 | – | 0 |
| Guilford | | – | | 2 | – | 1 | – | 0 |
| West Virginia | | – | | 5 | – | 4 | – | 1 |
| Davidson | | – | | 1 | – | 1 | – | 0 |
| Georgia Tech | | – | | 1 | – | 1 | – | 0 |
| Columbian | | – | | 4 | – | 5 | – | 1 |
| Richmond | | – | | 3 | – | 5 | – | 0 |
| North Carolina A&M | | – | | 1 | – | 2 | – | 0 |
| Texas A&M | | – | | 1 | – | 2 | – | 0 |
| Delaware | | – | | 1 | – | 5 | – | 1 |
| William & Mary | | – | | 0 | – | 1 | – | 0 |
| Marshall | | – | | 0 | – | 3 | – | 0 |
| South Carolina | | – | | 0 | – | 3 | – | 0 |

The 1897 Delaware football team represented Delaware College in American football during the 1897 season. (later renamed the University of Delaware) as an independent during the 1897 college football season. Led by first-year head coach Herbert Rice, the team posted a 1−5–1 record.

== Schedule ==
| Date | Opponent | Site | Result |
|---|---|---|---|
| October 2 | Haverford | Newark, DE | L 0–16 |
| October 6 | Swarthmore | Wilmington, DE | L 6–12 |
| October 16 | Ursinus | Newark, DE | W 4–0 |
| October 23 | at Haverford | Haverford, PA | L 0–48 |
| October 30−31 | Ursinus | | L |
| November 5 | St. John's (MD) | | T 14−14 |
| November 13 | at Pennsylvania Military | Chester, PA | L 0–18 |
