= 1897 VPI football team =

American college football season

1897 VPI football
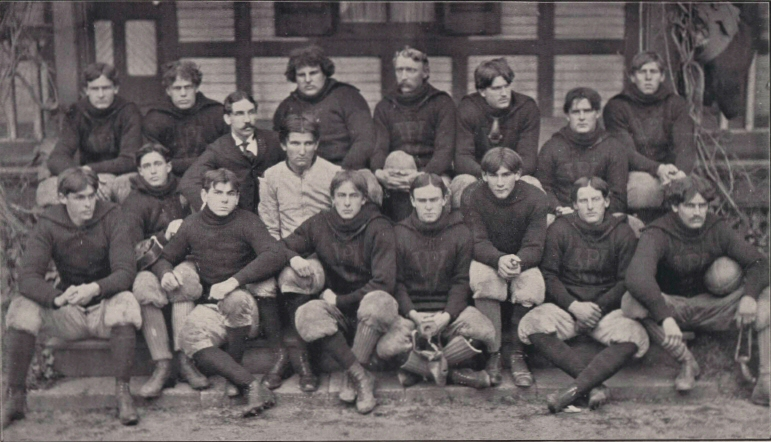
- Conference: Independent
- Record: 5–2
- Head coach: Charles Firth (1st season)
- Captain: Howard Archer Johnson
- Home stadium: Sheib Field

1897 Southern college football independents records
	Conf.			Overall
Team	W	L	T	W		L		T
Oklahoma		–		2	–	0	–	0
Arkansas		–		2	–	0	–	1
Navy		–		8	–	1	–	0
Virginia		–		6	–	2	–	1
Add-Ran		–		3	–	1	–	0
Washington and Lee		–		3	–	1	–	0
VPI		–		5	–	2	–	0
North Carolina		–		7	–	3	–	0
VMI		–		3	–	2	–	0
Guilford		–		2	–	1	–	0
West Virginia		–		5	–	4	–	1
Davidson		–		1	–	1	–	0
Georgia Tech		–		1	–	1	–	0
Columbian		–		4	–	5	–	1
Richmond		–		3	–	5	–	0
North Carolina A&M		–		1	–	2	–	0
Texas A&M		–		1	–	2	–	0
Delaware		–		1	–	5	–	1
William & Mary		–		0	–	1	–	0
Marshall		–		0	–	3	–	0
South Carolina		–		0	–	3	–	0

The 1897 VPI football team represented Virginia Agricultural and Mechanical College and Polytechnic Institute in the 1897 college football season. The team was led by their head coach Charles Firth and finished with a record of five wins and two losses (5–2).

== Schedule ==
Date	Time	Opponent	Site	Result	Attendance	Source
October 16		King	Sheib Field; Blacksburg, VA	W 54–0		
October 30	3:30 p.m.	vs. North Carolina	Athletic Park; Danville, VA	W 4–0	500	
November 2		Roanoke	Sheib Field; Blacksburg, VA	W 41–0		
November 6	4:00 p.m.	vs. University of Maryland, Baltimore	League Park; Norfolk, VA	L 4–18	500	
November 13	3:30 p.m.	at Richmond	Broad Street Park; Richmond, VA	W 36–0	300–500	
November 15	9:30 a.m.	at Hampden–Sydney	Venable Field; Hampden Sydney, VA	W 16–0		
November 25	3:30 p.m.	vs. Tennessee	Athletic Park; Roanoke, VA	L 0–18	1,200	

== Game summaries ==
=== King ===
King College at VPI

Team	1	2	Total
King	0	0	0
• VPI	28	26	54

- Date: October 16, 1897
- Location: Sheib Field
  Blacksburg, VA
- Referee: Jerrell

VPI's first game of the season was a victory over King College at Sheib Field.

The starting lineup for VPI was: Johnson (left end), Herbert (left tackle), Cox (left guard), Stull (center), Pelter (right guard), Wood (right tackle), Lewis (right end), Bell (quarterback), Barnett (left halfback), Cochran (right halfback), Whitehurst (fullback). The substitutes were: Painter.

The starting lineup for King College was: Bowman (left end), Thomas (left tackle), Barnes (left guard), Smith (center), Wallace (right guard), Mills (right tackle), Rogan (right end), McCorkle (quarterback), Hudson (left halfback), Venable (right halfback), White (fullback). The substitutes were: McRae.

=== North Carolina ===
North Carolina vs. VPI

Team	1	2	Total
UNC	0	0	0
• VPI	4	0	4

- Date: October 30, 1897
- Location: Athletic Park
  Danville, VA
- Game start: 3:30 p.m.
- Game attendance: 500
- Referee: Douglass

After their victory over King, VPI played the University of North Carolina at Athletic Park in Danville, Virginia.

The starting lineup for VPI was: Johnson (left end), Herbert (left tackle), Cox (left guard), Stull (center), Pelter (right guard), Wood (right tackle), Lewis (right end), Bell (quarterback), Barnett (left halfback), Cochran (right halfback), Whitehurst (fullback). The substitutes were: Painter, Rorebeck and Rucker.

The starting lineup for North Carolina was: William White (left end), Frank Bennett (left tackle), Seaton Borland (left guard), H. B. Cunningham (center), Cromartie (right guard), Simmons (right tackle), Warren Kluttz (right end), Frank O. Rogers (quarterback), Cameron Buxton (left halfback), Paul Collins (right halfback), Arthur Belden (fullback). The substitutes were: Edward Abbott, E. V. Howell, Jim MacRae and Willie Turner.

=== Maryland, Baltimore ===
Maryland, Baltimore vs. VPI

Team	1	2	Total
• UMB	12	6	18
VPI	0	4	4

- Date: November 6, 1897
- Location: League Park
  Norfolk, VA
- Game start: 4:00 p.m.
- Game attendance: 500
- Referee: Saunders Taylor

The starting lineup for VPI was: Johnson (left end), Herbert (left tackle), Cox (left guard), Stull (center), Pelter (right guard), Wood (right tackle), Lewis (right end), Bell (quarterback), Barnett (left halfback), Cochran (right halfback), Whitehurst (fullback).

The starting lineup for Maryland, Baltimore was: Denson (left end), Bellingslea (left tackle), Craig (left guard), Messmore (center), Cathell (right guard), Lewis (right tackle), Allen (right end), Barrow (quarterback), Roach (left halfback), Frosher (right halfback), Reddington (fullback). The substitutes were: Hicks.

=== Unofficial Game Against Portsmouth ===
On November 8, VPI played an unofficial game against a local Portsmouth, Virginia team. The Portsmouth team scored first, with a forty yard touchdown run by Bennett and the follow-up goal by Langhorne. These were the only points scored in the first half. VPI scored their only touchdown in the second half, with Whitehurst kicking the goal. The game ended in a tie, 6-6.

=== Richmond ===
VPI at Richmond

Team	1	2	Total
Richmond	0	0	0
• VPI	30	6	36

- Date: November 13, 1897
- Location: Broad Street Park
  Richmond, VA
- Game start: 3:30 p.m.
- Game attendance: 300–500
- Referee: Bosher

The starting lineup for VPI was: Johnson (left end), Herbert (left tackle), Cox (left guard), Stull (center), Pelter (right guard), Wood (right tackle), Lewis (right end), Jones (quarterback), Barnett (left halfback), Cochran (right halfback), Whitehurst (fullback). The substitutes were: Bell, Rucker and Saunders.

The starting lineup for Richmond was: Newit Pope (left end), William Powell (left tackle), William Thraves (left guard), Samuel Stone (center), Bonnie Daughtry (right guard), Benjamin Bloxton (right tackle), Charles Scott (right end), John Kaufman (quarterback), John Frazer (left halfback), Burnley Lankford (right halfback), John McNeil (fullback). The substitutes were: A. Winfield Parke.

=== Hampden–Sydney ===
VPI at Hampden–Sydney

Team	1	2	Total
• VPI	10	6	16
HS	0	0	0

- Date: November 15, 1897
- Location: Venable Field
  Hampden Sydney, VA
- Game start: 9:30 a.m.

The starting lineup for VPI was: Painter (left end), Herbert (left tackle), Cox (left guard), Stull (center), Pelter (right guard), Wood (right tackle), Lewis (right end), Bell (quarterback), Barnett (left halfback), Cochran (right halfback), Whitehurst (fullback). The substitutes were: Rucker.

The starting lineup for Hampden–Sydney was: Frederick McClure (left end), Murray (left tackle), Samuel Osbourne (left guard), Eskridge (center), Williams (right guard), Charles Hudson (right tackle), Eugene Douglass (right end), David Stuart (quarterback), Thomas Blake (left halfback), Bull (right halfback), John Earhart (fullback). The substitutes were: James Kuykendall.

=== Tennessee ===
Tennessee vs. VPI

Team	1	2	Total
• Tenn	6	12	18
VPI	0	0	0

- Date: November 25, 1897
- Location: Athletic Park
  Roanoke, VA
- Game start: 3:30 p.m.
- Game attendance: 1,200
- Game weather: Drizzling rin
- Referee: Donovan

The starting lineup for VPI was: Johnson (left end), Herbert (left tackle), Cox (left guard), Stull (center), Pelter (right guard), Wood (right tackle), Lewis (right end), Bell (quarterback), Barnett (left halfback), Cochran (right halfback), Whitehurst (fullback). The substitutes were: Painter and Rucker.

The starting lineup for Tennessee was: Henry Smith (left end), Arthur Watkins (left tackle), Robert Baird (left guard), Charles Rogan (center), John Rice (right guard), James Baird (right tackle), Arthur Tarwater (right end), Sammy Strang (quarterback), Charley Moran (left halfback), Henry Edmonds (right halfback), Jones (fullback).

== Players ==
The following players were members of the 1897 football team according to the roster published in the 1898 and 1903 editions of The Bugle, the Virginia Tech yearbook.

VPI 1897 roster
Quarterback: William Frazier Bell; Guards: W. F. Cox; Joseph Glenwood Pelter; Tackles: Richard Ainsworth Herbert; Charles Morton Wood; Center: John Walter Stull	Ends: Howard Archer Johnson (Capt.); Harold Benjamin Lewis; Halfbacks: Thomas Roy Barnett(e); Charles Weedon Cochran; Fullback: Obediah Francis Whitehurst	Substitutes: Charles Whitfield Painter; Curtis Grant Rorebeck; Bayard Ambrose Rucker; Fleming Saunders; Robert Mayo Scott; Edward Colston Taylor

== Coaching and training staff ==
- Head coach: Charles Firth
- Manager: Carl Ernest Hardy
- Assistant manager: Samuel Henry Sheib
- Medical adviser: W. F. Henderson, MD
