= 1897 Navy Midshipmen football team =

American college football season

1897 Navy Midshipmen football
- Conference: Independent
- Record: 8–1
- Head coach: Bill Armstrong (1st season)
- Captain: Johnny Halligan
- Home stadium: Worden Field

1897 Southern college football independents records
	Conf.			Overall
Team	W	L	T	W		L		T
Oklahoma		–		2	–	0	–	0
Arkansas		–		2	–	0	–	1
Navy		–		8	–	1	–	0
Virginia		–		6	–	2	–	1
Add-Ran		–		3	–	1	–	0
Washington and Lee		–		3	–	1	–	0
VPI		–		5	–	2	–	0
North Carolina		–		7	–	3	–	0
VMI		–		3	–	2	–	0
Guilford		–		2	–	1	–	0
West Virginia		–		5	–	4	–	1
Davidson		–		1	–	1	–	0
Georgia Tech		–		1	–	1	–	0
Columbian		–		4	–	5	–	1
Richmond		–		3	–	5	–	0
North Carolina A&M		–		1	–	2	–	0
Texas A&M		–		1	–	2	–	0
Delaware		–		1	–	5	–	1
William & Mary		–		0	–	1	–	0
Marshall		–		0	–	3	–	0
South Carolina		–		0	–	3	–	0

The 1897 Navy Midshipmen football team represented the United States Naval Academy during the 1897 college football season. In their first season under head coach Bill Armstrong, the Midshipmen compiled an 8–1 record, shut out seven opponents, and outscored all opponents by a combined score of 111 to 34. The Army–Navy Game was canceled due to a Presidential cabinet order.

== Schedule ==
Date	Opponent	Site	Result	Attendance	Source
October 9	Princeton	Worden Field; Annapolis, MD	L 0–28	3,000	
October 16	Penn second team	Worden Field; Annapolis, MD	W 22–0		
October 23	Princeton second team	Worden Field; Annapolis, MD	W 6–0		
October 30	Penn State	Worden Field; Annapolis, MD	W 4–0		
November 6	Rutgers	Worden Field; Annapolis, MD	W 1–0 (forfeit)		
November 13	Virginia	Worden Field; Annapolis, MD	W 4–0		
November 17	University of Maryland, Baltimore	Worden Field; Annapolis, MD	W 38–0		
November 20	Lehigh	Worden Field; Annapolis, MD	W 28–6		
November 28	White Squadron	Worden Field; Annapolis, MD	W 8–0		
