= 1897 Richmond Spiders football team =

American college football season

1897 Richmond Spiders football
- Conference: Independent
- Record: 3–5
- Head coach: Bill Wertenbaker (1st season)
- Captain: John W. T. McNeil
- Home stadium: Broad Street Park

1897 Southern college football independents records
	Conf.			Overall
Team	W	L	T	W		L		T
Oklahoma		–		2	–	0	–	0
Arkansas		–		2	–	0	–	1
Navy		–		8	–	1	–	0
Virginia		–		6	–	2	–	1
Add-Ran		–		3	–	1	–	0
Washington and Lee		–		3	–	1	–	0
VPI		–		5	–	2	–	0
North Carolina		–		7	–	3	–	0
VMI		–		3	–	2	–	0
Guilford		–		2	–	1	–	0
West Virginia		–		5	–	4	–	1
Davidson		–		1	–	1	–	0
Georgia Tech		–		1	–	1	–	0
Columbian		–		4	–	5	–	1
Richmond		–		3	–	5	–	0
North Carolina A&M		–		1	–	2	–	0
Texas A&M		–		1	–	2	–	0
Delaware		–		1	–	5	–	1
William & Mary		–		0	–	1	–	0
Marshall		–		0	–	3	–	0
South Carolina		–		0	–	3	–	0

The 1897 Richmond Spiders football team was an American football team that represented Richmond College—now known as the University of Richmond—as an independent during the 1897 college football season. Led by Bill Wertenbaker in his first and only year as head coach, Richmond compiled a record of 3–5.

== Schedule ==
Date	Time	Opponent	Site	Result	Attendance	Source
October 2		Richmond Athletics	Broad Street Park; Richmond, VA	L 0–20		
October 9		at Hampton A.C.	Hampton, VA	L 0–32		
October 16		Randolph–Macon	Broad Street Park; Richmond, VA	W 6–4		
October 30		at Petersburg YMCA	Petersburg, VA	W 26–0		
November 2	4:00 p.m.	Hampden–Sydney	Broad Street Park; Richmond, VA	W 8–6		
November 5		Columbian	Broad Street Park; Richmond, VA	L 0–22		
November 9	3:45 p.m.	St. Alban's (VA)	Richmond, VA	L 0–20		
November 13	3:30 p.m.	VPI	Broad Street Park; Richmond, VA	L 0–36	300–500	
