= 1897 Georgia Tech football team =

American college football season

1897 Georgia Tech football
- Conference: Independent
- Record: 1–1–0
- Head coach: J. B. Wood (2nd season)
- Captain: Walter West
- Home stadium: Brisbine Park

1897 Southern college football independents records
	Conf.			Overall
Team	W	L	T	W		L		T
Oklahoma		–		2	–	0	–	0
Arkansas		–		2	–	0	–	1
Navy		–		8	–	1	–	0
Virginia		–		6	–	2	–	1
Add-Ran		–		3	–	1	–	0
Washington and Lee		–		3	–	1	–	0
VPI		–		5	–	2	–	0
North Carolina		–		7	–	3	–	0
VMI		–		3	–	2	–	0
Guilford		–		2	–	1	–	0
West Virginia		–		5	–	4	–	1
Davidson		–		1	–	1	–	0
Georgia Tech		–		1	–	1	–	0
Columbian		–		4	–	5	–	1
Richmond		–		3	–	5	–	0
North Carolina A&M		–		1	–	2	–	0
Texas A&M		–		1	–	2	–	0
Delaware		–		1	–	5	–	1
William & Mary		–		0	–	1	–	0
Marshall		–		0	–	3	–	0
South Carolina		–		0	–	3	–	0

The 1897 Georgia Tech football team represented the Georgia School of Technology during the 1897 college football season. The team was called the Techs throughout the season. After fielding no team in 1895, the 1896 Georgia Tech team played well and finished with a record of 2–2–1. Georgia Tech had much optimism heading into the 1897 season; however, all Georgia football teams agreed to disband on November 3.

J. B. Wood returned to coach the team for his second season. Allgood Holmes was elected as the team's manager. The team had a training table installed in the basement of the newly built Knowles Dormitory on campus, which also featured a gym and hot and cold baths. Tech also scheduled weekly practices with the Fort McPherson team.

Practices began on September 29 with over fifty players trying out for the team. With so many players, Wood was able to form a second team to give the varsity team a regular group to compete against. Georgia Tech held practice games against the Atlanta YMCA on October 5 (6-6), 6 (0-8), 7 (4-0), and 8 (unknown score) at Brisbine Park, which Georgia Tech had leased for the season. Another practice game was played against the local College Park team, winning by 18-0. Wood said of the team before the season: "We regard the outlook as being unusually good. The boys are now getting down to hard work, and we feel confident we will win. The material is mostly raw, but we are fast overcoming this difficulty with hard training. There is no reason why we should not carry off our full share of the honors this season, if the boys will work."

After compiling a record of 1-1-0, Georgia Tech's season came to an abrupt end following the death of Georgia player Von Gammon in a football game on October 30. Gammon had been considering playing at Tech prior to the season. On November 1, the Atlanta City Council announced that it would be a misdemeanor to play football within the city limits. Georgia Tech had a match scheduled against Mercer for November 6, but the teams decided to cancel the game. Georgia Tech's Athletic Association disbanded the team on November 3 pursuant to an agreement reached in a meeting of managers of schools in Alabama, Georgia, and Tennessee the night before. Football was almost outlawed completely in Georgia by legislative action, but the final bill was vetoed by Governor William Atkinson.

== Schedule ==
Date	Time	Opponent	Site	Result	Attendance	Source
October 23		at Georgia	Alumni Athletic Field; Athens, GA (rivalry)	L 0–28	600	
October 30		at Mercer (Note: The Georgia Tech football information guide erroneously omits this game)	Central City Park; Macon, GA	W 20–0		
November 6		Mercer	Brisbine Park; Atlanta, GA	Cancelled (Note: Following the death of Georgia player Von Gammon in a game on October 30, the Atlanta City Council declared football games illegal within the city limits. The teams called the game off as a result.)		

Georgia Tech also planned games against Alabama (set for October 23), Auburn, Clemson, and Sewanee, plus a second game against Georgia (set for November 30); however, these plans never materialized.

== Game summaries ==
Georgia Tech Techs (0–0–0) at Georgia 'Varsity (1–0–0)

Quarter	1	2	Total
Georgia Tech	0	0	0
Georgia	10	18	28

at Alumni Athletic Field • Athens, Georgia

- Date: Saturday, October 23, 1897
- Game time: Unknown
- Game attendance: 600
- Referee: Wilson

Georgia Tech's first game of the season came against Georgia in Athens, the second ever match between the schools. Georgia Tech won their previous meeting in 1893. The teams only played twenty-five minute halves.

The first half was played very tough. Georgia Tech won the toss and punted it away, but Georgia fumbled on its first possession. The two sides went back and forth for several drives until Georgia Tech's Hart picked up a blocked punt and took off for the goal, but Georgia's Tichenor made a saving tackle. Tech did not threaten the endzone again. On their next possession, Georgia moved the ball thirty-five yards and scored the first touchdown of the game. On its next possession, Georgia was able to take the ball all the way to the Techs' fifteen-yard line, but it missed an attempt at kicking a goal. However, Tech's next punt was blocked, setting up a second Georgia touchdown. The half ended with Georgia leading 10 to 0.

The second half turned into a rout. Georgia Tech's defense grew tired and they were unable to stop Georgia's rush, first going through the center and then around the ends. Georgia was able to score three touchdowns in the second half and Georgia Tech failed to score. The game ended as a 28-0 victory for Georgia.

Georgia Tech Techs (0–1–0) at Mercer Baptists (0–1–0)

Quarter	1	2	Total
Georgia Tech (Note: Scoring for each half is not known. Georgia Tech scored at least one touchdown in the second half.)	20	0	20
Mercer	0	0	0

at Central City Park • Macon, Georgia

- Date: Saturday, October 30, 1897
- Game time: Unknown
- Game attendance: "Not as large as it should have been."
- Referee: Polhill Wheeler

This was the fifth meeting between the schools with Georgia Tech holding a 2-1-1 series lead, though all of the games were decided by a touchdown or less. Tech's coach, J. B. Wood, joined the team at halfback to the protests of Mercer, who claimed that he was practically a professional. After some discussion, Wood was granted permission to play. The Techs were the stronger and larger team, but Mercer played well and maintained composure. Georgia Tech won the game 20-0.

The Techs remained in Macon overnight. Following the game, the Tech and Mercer players learned of the death of Von Gammon during the Georgia-Virginia match. Gammon was well known and liked among the players. The players feared that his death would cause football to be shut down for the season, if not longer as the Georgia legislature had been debating a prohibition of football in Georgia for the past year. A second game against Mercer scheduled for November 6 was cancelled and the team disbanded for the season on November 3.

== Players ==
Georgia Tech Techs 1897 game starters
	Georgia	Mercer
Left End	L. R. Hart	Wilson
Left Tackle	J. B. Wood	L. R. Hart
Left Guard	Leigh	Leigh
Center	Walter West (C)	Walter West (C)
Right Guard	Joe Pelham	Joe Pelham
Right Tackle	Newman	Newman
Right End	J. L. Jones	J. L. Jones
Quarterback	Hardin Jones	Hardin Jones
Left Halfback	J. C. Crawford	J. C. Crawford
Right Halfback	Palmour	J. B. Wood
Fullback	Freyer	Freyer
Substitutes	Holmes • McClane • George Merritt • Naw • Robertson	
