= List of Maryland Intercollegiate Football Association standings =

This is a list of yearly Maryland Intercollegiate Football Association standings.

== Maryland Intercollegiate Football Association standings ==
1894 Maryland Intercollegiate Football Association standings
	Conf.					Overall
Team	W		L		T	W		L		T
Maryland	2	–	2	–	0	4	–	3	–	0
$ – Conference champion

1897 Maryland Intercollegiate Football Association standings
	Conf.					Overall
Team	W		L		T	W		L		T
Gallaudet $	3	–	0	–	1	4	–	1	–	1
Maryland	0	–	3	–	0	2	–	4	–	0
$ – Conference champion

1896 Maryland Intercollegiate Football Association standings
	Conf.					Overall
Team	W		L		T	W		L		T
Maryland		–		–		6	–	2	–	2
$ – Conference champion

1899 Maryland Intercollegiate Football Association standings
	Conf.					Overall
Team	W		L		T	W		L		T
Johns Hopkins $	3	–	1	–	0	4	–	2	–	0
$ – Conference champion
