= 1897 Virginia Orange and Blue football team =

American college football season

1897 Virginia Orange and Blue football

Southern co-champion
- Conference: Independent
- Record: 6–2–1
- Head coach: Martin V. Bergen (2nd season)
- Captain: James Morrison
- Home stadium: Madison Hall Field

1897 Southern college football independents records
	Conf.			Overall
Team	W	L	T	W		L		T
Oklahoma		–		2	–	0	–	0
Arkansas		–		2	–	0	–	1
Navy		–		8	–	1	–	0
Virginia		–		6	–	2	–	1
Add-Ran		–		3	–	1	–	0
Washington and Lee		–		3	–	1	–	0
VPI		–		5	–	2	–	0
North Carolina		–		7	–	3	–	0
VMI		–		3	–	2	–	0
Guilford		–		2	–	1	–	0
West Virginia		–		5	–	4	–	1
Davidson		–		1	–	1	–	0
Georgia Tech		–		1	–	1	–	0
Columbian		–		4	–	5	–	1
Richmond		–		3	–	5	–	0
North Carolina A&M		–		1	–	2	–	0
Texas A&M		–		1	–	2	–	0
Delaware		–		1	–	5	–	1
William & Mary		–		0	–	1	–	0
Marshall		–		0	–	3	–	0
South Carolina		–		0	–	3	–	0

The 1897 Virginia Orange and Blue football team represented the University of Virginia as an independent the 1897 college football season. Led by second-year coach Martin Bergen, the team went 6–2–1 and claims a Southern co-championship. The Cavaliers tied Vanderbilt in the southern championship game. The Georgia game saw the death of Richard Von Albade Gammon. The team's captain was James Morrison.

== Schedule ==
Date	Time	Opponent	Site	Result	Attendance	Source
October 2		Franklin & Marshall	Madison Hall Field; Charlottesville, VA	W 38–0		
October 9		St. Albans	Madison Hall Field; Charlottesville, VA	W 14–0		
October 13	3:41 p.m.	at Penn	Franklin Field; Philadelphia, PA	L 0–42	3,000	
October 30		vs. Georgia	Piedmont Park; Atlanta, GA	W 17–4		
November 6		Gallaudet	Madison Hall Field; Charlottesville, VA	W 20–4		
November 13		at Navy	Worden Field; Annapolis, MD	L 0–4		
November 18		Columbian	Madison Hall Field; Charlottesville, VA	W 10–0		
November 25	3:00 p.m.	vs. North Carolina	West-End Park; Richmond, VA (South's Oldest Rivalry)	W 12–0	4,000	
December 6		at Vanderbilt	Dudley Field; Nashville, TN	T 0–0	2,400–4,000	
