= 1897 William & Mary Orange and White football team =

American college football season

1897 William & Mary Orange and White football
- Conference: Independent
- Record: 0–1
- Head coach: W. J. King (1st season)
- Captain: W. P. Cole

1897 Southern college football independents records
| | Conf. | | | Overall |
| Team | W | L | T | W | | L | | T |
|---|---|---|---|---|---|---|---|---|
| Oklahoma | | – | | 2 | – | 0 | – | 0 |
| Arkansas | | – | | 2 | – | 0 | – | 1 |
| Navy | | – | | 8 | – | 1 | – | 0 |
| Virginia | | – | | 6 | – | 2 | – | 1 |
| Add-Ran | | – | | 3 | – | 1 | – | 0 |
| Washington and Lee | | – | | 3 | – | 1 | – | 0 |
| VPI | | – | | 5 | – | 2 | – | 0 |
| North Carolina | | – | | 7 | – | 3 | – | 0 |
| VMI | | – | | 3 | – | 2 | – | 0 |
| Guilford | | – | | 2 | – | 1 | – | 0 |
| West Virginia | | – | | 5 | – | 4 | – | 1 |
| Davidson | | – | | 1 | – | 1 | – | 0 |
| Georgia Tech | | – | | 1 | – | 1 | – | 0 |
| Columbian | | – | | 4 | – | 5 | – | 1 |
| Richmond | | – | | 3 | – | 5 | – | 0 |
| North Carolina A&M | | – | | 1 | – | 2 | – | 0 |
| Texas A&M | | – | | 1 | – | 2 | – | 0 |
| Delaware | | – | | 1 | – | 5 | – | 1 |
| William & Mary | | – | | 0 | – | 1 | – | 0 |
| Marshall | | – | | 0 | – | 3 | – | 0 |
| South Carolina | | – | | 0 | – | 3 | – | 0 |

The 1897 William & Mary Orange and White football team represented the College of William & Mary during the 1897 college football season.

== Schedule ==
| Date | Opponent | Site | Result | Source |
|---|---|---|---|---|
| November 6 | Columbian | Williamsburg, VA | L 0–30 | |
