= 1897 Texas A&M Aggies football team =

American college football season

1897 Texas A&M Aggies football
- Conference: Independent
- Record: 1–2
- Head coach: C. W. Taylor (1st season)

1897 Southern college football independents records
| | Conf. | | | Overall |
| Team | W | L | T | W | | L | | T |
|---|---|---|---|---|---|---|---|---|
| Oklahoma | | – | | 2 | – | 0 | – | 0 |
| Arkansas | | – | | 2 | – | 0 | – | 1 |
| Navy | | – | | 8 | – | 1 | – | 0 |
| Virginia | | – | | 6 | – | 2 | – | 1 |
| Add-Ran | | – | | 3 | – | 1 | – | 0 |
| Washington and Lee | | – | | 3 | – | 1 | – | 0 |
| VPI | | – | | 5 | – | 2 | – | 0 |
| North Carolina | | – | | 7 | – | 3 | – | 0 |
| VMI | | – | | 3 | – | 2 | – | 0 |
| Guilford | | – | | 2 | – | 1 | – | 0 |
| West Virginia | | – | | 5 | – | 4 | – | 1 |
| Davidson | | – | | 1 | – | 1 | – | 0 |
| Georgia Tech | | – | | 1 | – | 1 | – | 0 |
| Columbian | | – | | 4 | – | 5 | – | 1 |
| Richmond | | – | | 3 | – | 5 | – | 0 |
| North Carolina A&M | | – | | 1 | – | 2 | – | 0 |
| Texas A&M | | – | | 1 | – | 2 | – | 0 |
| Delaware | | – | | 1 | – | 5 | – | 1 |
| William & Mary | | – | | 0 | – | 1 | – | 0 |
| Marshall | | – | | 0 | – | 3 | – | 0 |
| South Carolina | | – | | 0 | – | 3 | – | 0 |

The 1897 A&M Aggies football team represented the Agricultural and Mechanical College of Texas—now known as Texas A&M University—as an independent during the 1897 college football season. Led by C. W. Taylor in his first and only season as head coach, the Aggies compiled a record of 1–2.

== Schedule ==
| Date | Time | Opponent | Site | Result | Source |
|---|---|---|---|---|---|
| November 6 | | at Houston High School | Houston, TX | L 0–10 | |
| November 13 | 4:00 p.m, | Add-Ran Christian | College Station, TX (rivalry) | L 6–30 | |
| November 25 | | at Austin | Sherman, TX | W 4–0 | |
