= 1897 Columbian Orange and Blue football team =

American college football season

1897 Columbian Orange and Blue football
- Conference: Independent
- Record: 4–5–1
- Head coach: Graham Nichols (2nd season)

1897 Southern college football independents records
	Conf.			Overall
Team	W	L	T	W		L		T
Oklahoma		–		2	–	0	–	0
Arkansas		–		2	–	0	–	1
Navy		–		8	–	1	–	0
Virginia		–		6	–	2	–	1
Add-Ran		–		3	–	1	–	0
Washington and Lee		–		3	–	1	–	0
VPI		–		5	–	2	–	0
North Carolina		–		7	–	3	–	0
VMI		–		3	–	2	–	0
Guilford		–		2	–	1	–	0
West Virginia		–		5	–	4	–	1
Davidson		–		1	–	1	–	0
Georgia Tech		–		1	–	1	–	0
Columbian		–		4	–	5	–	1
Richmond		–		3	–	5	–	0
North Carolina A&M		–		1	–	2	–	0
Texas A&M		–		1	–	2	–	0
Delaware		–		1	–	5	–	1
William & Mary		–		0	–	1	–	0
Marshall		–		0	–	3	–	0
South Carolina		–		0	–	3	–	0

The 1897 Columbian Orange and Blue football team was an American football team that represented Columbian University (now known as George Washington University) as an independent during the 1897 college football season. In their second season under head coach Graham Nichols, the team compiled a 4–5–1 record.

== Schedule ==
Date	Opponent	Site	Result	Source
October 8	at Washington and Lee	Lexington, VA	L 2–10	
October 9	at VMI	Lexington, VA	L 4–14	
October 21	at Richmond Athletic Club	Richmond, VA	W 4–0	
October 30	vs. Columbia Athletic Club	National Park; Washington, DC	W 6–4	
November 4	at Hampton Athletic Club	Hampton, VA	L 0–6	
November 5	at Richmond	Broad Street Park; Richmond, VA	W 22–0	
November 6	at William & Mary	Williamsburg, VA	W 30–0	
November 11	at University of Maryland, Baltimore	Electric Park; Baltimore, MD	T 0–0	
November 18	at Virginia	Madison Hall Field; Charlottesville, VA	L 0–10	
November 25	vs. Columbia Athletic Club	National Park; Washington, DC	L 0–4	
