= 1897 North Carolina A&M Aggies football team =

American college football season

1897 North Carolina A&M Aggies football
- Conference: Independent
- Record: 1–2
- Head coach: Perrin Busbee (3rd season)

1897 Southern college football independents records
	Conf.			Overall
Team	W	L	T	W		L		T
Oklahoma		–		2	–	0	–	0
Arkansas		–		2	–	0	–	1
Navy		–		8	–	1	–	0
Virginia		–		6	–	2	–	1
Add-Ran		–		3	–	1	–	0
Washington and Lee		–		3	–	1	–	0
VPI		–		5	–	2	–	0
North Carolina		–		7	–	3	–	0
VMI		–		3	–	2	–	0
Guilford		–		2	–	1	–	0
West Virginia		–		5	–	4	–	1
Davidson		–		1	–	1	–	0
Georgia Tech		–		1	–	1	–	0
Columbian		–		4	–	5	–	1
Richmond		–		3	–	5	–	0
North Carolina A&M		–		1	–	2	–	0
Texas A&M		–		1	–	2	–	0
Delaware		–		1	–	5	–	1
William & Mary		–		0	–	1	–	0
Marshall		–		0	–	3	–	0
South Carolina		–		0	–	3	–	0

The 1897 North Carolina A&M Aggies football team represented the North Carolina A&M Aggies of North Carolina College of Agriculture and Mechanic Arts (now known as North Carolina State University) during the 1897 college football season.

== Schedule ==
Date	Opponent	Site	Result	Source
October 2	at North Carolina	Campus Athletic Field; Chapel Hill, NC (rivalry)	L 0–40	
October 22	Guilford	Raleigh, NC	L 0–18	
November 12	Davidson	Raleigh, NC	W 19–0	
