= 1899 Virginia Orange and Blue football team =

American college football season

1899 Virginia Orange and Blue football
- Conference: Independent
- Record: 4–3–2
- Head coach: Archie Hoxton (1st season)
- Captain: H. T. Summersgill
- Home stadium: Madison Hall Field

1899 Southern college football independents records
	Conf.			Overall
Team	W	L	T	W		L		T
VMI		–		1	–	0	–	0
VPI		–		4	–	1	–	0
Delaware		–		6	–	2	–	0
Arkansas		–		3	–	1	–	1
Georgetown		–		5	–	2	–	1
Texas A&M		–		4	–	2	–	0
Oklahoma		–		2	–	1	–	0
Baylor		–		2	–	1	–	1
Guilford		–		2	–	1	–	1
Navy		–		5	–	3	–	0
Virginia		–		4	–	3	–	2
Add-Ran		–		0	–	0	–	1
Richmond		–		2	–	2	–	0
South Carolina		–		2	–	3	–	0
West Virginia		–		2	–	3	–	0
William & Mary		–		2	–	3	–	0
North Carolina A&M		–		1	–	2	–	2
Davidson		–		1	–	3	–	1
Maryland		–		1	–	4	–	0
Marshall		–		0	–	0	–	1

The 1899 Virginia Orange and Blue football team represented the University of Virginia as an independent during the 1899 college football season. Led by first-year head coach Archie Hoxton, the Orange and Blue compiled a record of 4–3–2.

== Schedule ==
Date	Time	Opponent	Site	Result	Attendance	Source
September 30		St. Albans	Madison Hall Field; Charlottesville, VA	W 10–0		
October 7		Episcopal High School	Madison Hall Field; Charlottesville, VA	W 33–6		
October 11		at Penn	Franklin Field; Philadelphia, PA	L 6–33		
October 14		Maryland Medical College	Madison Hall Field; Charlottesville, VA	T 0–0		
October 21		Gallaudet	Madison Hall Field; Charlottesville, VA	L 5–11		
November 4		vs. Michigan	Bennett Park; Detroit, MI	L 0–38	2,500–3,000	
November 11		VPI	Madison Hall Field; Charlottesville, VA (rivalry)	W 28–0		
November 18		at Georgetown	Georgetown Field; Washington, DC	T 0–0	6,000	
November 30	2:30 p.m.	vs. Lehigh	Broad Street Park; Richmond, VA	W 10–0	4,000	
