= James Morrison (American football) =

American football player, coach, and physician (1871–1939)

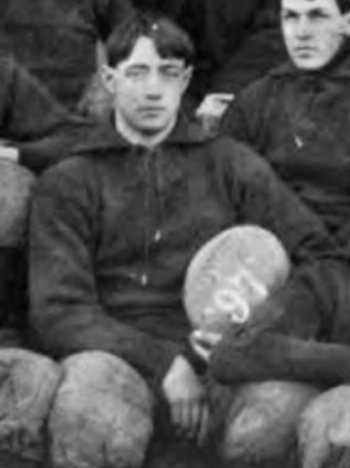
- Morrison pictured as captain of the 1897 Virginia football team

Biographical details
- Born: November 2, 1871; Lexington, Virginia, U.S.
- Died: May 15, 1940 (aged 68); Charlottesville, Virginia, U.S.
- Education: University of Virginia (1898)

Playing career
- 1897: Virginia

Coaching career (HC unless noted)
- 1898: Add-Ran Christian
- 1899: VPI

Head coaching record
- Overall: 5–4–1

James Morrison (November 2, 1871 – May 15, 1940) was an American college football player, coach, and physician.

After graduating from Hampden-Sydney College he attended the University of Texas (UT) as a graduate student, and while at UT he was a member of its first varsity football team in 1893. He later attended the University of Virginia (UVA) as a medical student and played on its football team for two seasons (1896–97), serving as its team captain in 1897.

Morrison graduated from the University of Virginia with a medical degree in 1898. Before beginning his medical career he served as the head football coach at Add-Ran Christian University—now known as Texas Christian University (TCU)—in 1898 and at Virginia Agricultural and Mechanical College and Polytechnic Institute (VPI)—now known as Virginia Tech—in 1899, compiling a career college football record of 5–4–1. He was later a pioneering otolaryngologist specialist in the south.

== Head coaching record ==
Year	Team	Overall	Conference	Standing	Bowl/playoffs
Add-Ran Christian (Independent) (1898)
1898	Add-Ran Christian	1–3–1			
Add-Ran Christian:		1–3–1			
VPI (Independent) (1899)
1899	VPI	4–1			
VPI:		4–1			
Total:		5–4–1			
