= 1897 Haverford football team =

American college football season

1897 Haverford football
- Conference: Independent
- Record: 8–1
- Head coach: Thomas Branson
- Captain: Haines

1897 Eastern college football independents records
	Conf.			Overall
Team	W	L	T	W		L		T
Penn		–		15	–	0	–	0
Princeton		–		10	–	1	–	0
Washington & Jefferson		–		10	–	1	–	0
Yale		–		9	–	0	–	2
Buffalo		–		9	–	1	–	0
Harvard		–		10	–	1	–	1
Army		–		6	–	1	–	1
Vermont		–		3	–	0	–	2
Lafayette		–		9	–	2	–	1
Drexel		–		6	–	2	–	1
Colgate		–		5	–	2	–	1
Dickinson		–		7	–	3	–	2
Swarthmore		–		7	–	3	–	2
Fordham		–		2	–	1	–	1
Cornell		–		5	–	3	–	1
Syracuse		–		5	–	3	–	1
Brown		–		7	–	4	–	0
Carlisle		–		6	–	4	–	0
Boston College		–		4	–	3	–	0
Holy Cross		–		4	–	3	–	1
Wesleyan		–		8	–	7	–	0
Bucknell		–		3	–	3	–	1
NYU		–		3	–	3	–	0
Temple		–		3	–	3	–	0
Trinity (CT)		–		4	–	4	–	1
Tufts		–		6	–	7	–	0
Geneva		–		3	–	4	–	1
Pittsburgh College		–		3	–	5	–	2
Villanova		–		3	–	5	–	1
Penn State		–		3	–	6	–	0
Amherst		–		2	–	6	–	2
Franklin & Marshall		–		2	–	6	–	2
Lehigh		–		3	–	7	–	0
New Hampshire		–		2	–	5	–	0
Rutgers		–		2	–	5	–	0
Western Univ. Penn.		–		1	–	3	–	0

The 1897 Haverford football team was an American football team that represented Haverford College as an independent during the 1897 college football season. The team compiled an 8–1 record and outscored opponents by a total of 153 to 22. Thomas Branson was the coach, and Varney was the captain.

== Schedule ==
Date	Opponent	Site	Result	Attendance	Source
October 2	at Delaware	Newark, DE	W 16–0		
October 9	Ursinus	Haverford, PA	W 18–0		
October 16	Dickinson	Haverford, PA	L 5–6		
October 20	at Johns Hopkins	Baltimore, MD	W 10–0		
October 23	Delaware	Haverford, PA	W 48–0		
October 27	Rutgers	Haverford, PA	W 28–0		
October 30	Franklin & Marshall	Haverford, PA	W 12–10		
November 13	Swarthmore	Haverford, PA (rivalry)	W 8–6	2,000	
November 25	at Pennsylvania Military	P.M.C. grounds; Chester, PA	W 10–0		
