= Colbert Searles =

American football coach and professor

Biographical details
- Born: August 15, 1873; Wilton, Maine, U.S.
- Died: January 15, 1947 (aged 73); Minneapolis, Minnesota, U.S.

Coaching career (HC unless noted)
- 1899–1900: Arkansas

Head coaching record
- Overall: 5–2–2

Colbert Searles (August 15, 1873 – January 15, 1947) was an American college football coach. He served as the head football coach at the University of Arkansas from 1899 to 1900. He was also a professor of Romance languages at the university during his tenure.

== Head coaching record ==
Year	Team	Overall	Conference	Standing	Bowl/playoffs
Arkansas Cardinals (Independent) (1899–1900)
1899	Arkansas	3–1–1			
1900	Arkansas	2–1–1			
Arkansas:		5–2–2			
Total:		5–2–2			
