= 1899 Texas A&M Aggies football team =

American college football season

1899 Texas A&M Aggies football
- Conference: Independent
- Record: 4–2
- Head coach: W. A. Murray (1st season)

1899 Southern college football independents records
	Conf.			Overall
Team	W	L	T	W		L		T
VMI		–		1	–	0	–	0
VPI		–		4	–	1	–	0
Delaware		–		6	–	2	–	0
Arkansas		–		3	–	1	–	1
Georgetown		–		5	–	2	–	1
Texas A&M		–		4	–	2	–	0
Oklahoma		–		2	–	1	–	0
Baylor		–		2	–	1	–	1
Guilford		–		2	–	1	–	1
Navy		–		5	–	3	–	0
Virginia		–		4	–	3	–	2
Add-Ran		–		0	–	0	–	1
Richmond		–		2	–	2	–	0
South Carolina		–		2	–	3	–	0
West Virginia		–		2	–	3	–	0
William & Mary		–		2	–	3	–	0
North Carolina A&M		–		1	–	2	–	2
Davidson		–		1	–	3	–	1
Maryland		–		1	–	4	–	0
Marshall		–		0	–	0	–	1

The 1899 A&M Aggies football team represented the Agricultural and Mechanical College of Texas—now known as Texas A&M University—as an independent during the 1899 college football season. Led by first-year head coach W. A. Murray, the Aggies compiled a record of 4–2.

== Schedule ==
Date	Time	Opponent	Site	Result	Attendance	Source
October 7		Houston High School	College Station, TX	W 43–0		
November 4		vs. Texas	San Antonio, TX (rivalry)	L 0–6		
November 10		vs. Sewanee	Herald Park; Houston, TX	L 0–10	600	
November 27		vs. Tulane	Herald Park; Houston, TX	W 22–0		
November 30	3:30 p.m.	at Baylor	West End Park; Waco, TX (rivalry)	W 33–0		
December 2		LSU	College Station, TX (rivalry)	W 52–0		
