= 1899 William & Mary Orange and White football team =

American college football season

1899 William & Mary Orange and White football
- Conference: Independent
- Record: 2–3
- Head coach: William H. Burke (1st season)
- Captain: J. E. Elliott

1899 Southern college football independents records
	Conf.			Overall
Team	W	L	T	W		L		T
VMI		–		1	–	0	–	0
VPI		–		4	–	1	–	0
Delaware		–		6	–	2	–	0
Arkansas		–		3	–	1	–	1
Georgetown		–		5	–	2	–	1
Texas A&M		–		4	–	2	–	0
Oklahoma		–		2	–	1	–	0
Baylor		–		2	–	1	–	1
Guilford		–		2	–	1	–	1
Navy		–		5	–	3	–	0
Virginia		–		4	–	3	–	2
Add-Ran		–		0	–	0	–	1
Richmond		–		2	–	2	–	0
South Carolina		–		2	–	3	–	0
West Virginia		–		2	–	3	–	0
William & Mary		–		2	–	3	–	0
North Carolina A&M		–		1	–	2	–	2
Davidson		–		1	–	3	–	1
Maryland		–		1	–	4	–	0
Marshall		–		0	–	0	–	1

The 1899 William & Mary Orange and White football team was an American football team that represented the College of William & Mary as an independent during the 1899 college football season. Led by William H. Burke in his first and only season as head coach, the Orange and White compiled a record of 2–3.

== Schedule ==
Date	Time	Opponent	Site	Result	Attendance	Source
October 21		at Richmond	Broad Street Park; Richmond, VA (rivalry)	L 0–41		
October 30	3:00 p.m.	Hampden–Sydney	Williamsburg, VA	L 0–6		
November 11		Portsmouth Athletic Club	Williamsburg, VA	L 0–6		
November 18		Hampton Athletic Club		W 41–0		
December 2		vs. Baltimore City College	Soldier's Home grounds; Newport News, VA	W 6–5	2,000	
