= Julien Hill =

American football coach and banker (1877–1943)

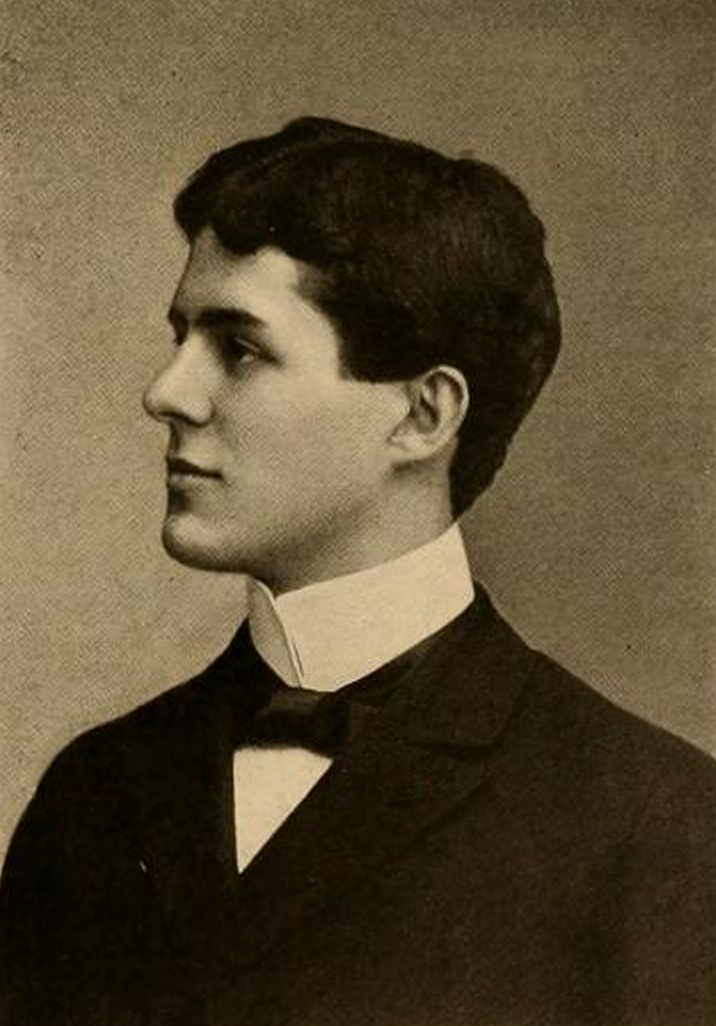
- Hill pictured c. early 1900s

Biographical details
- Born: September 15, 1877; Richmond, Virginia, U.S.
- Died: December 1, 1943 (aged 66); Richmond, Virginia, U.S.
- Education: University of Virginia

Coaching career (HC unless noted)
- 1899: Richmond

Head coaching record
- Overall: 2–2

Julien Harrison Hill (September 15, 1877 – December 1, 1943) was an American college football coach and banker. He was the tenth head football coach at Richmond College—now known as the University of Richmond—serving for one season, in 1899, and compiling a record of 2–2. He later was a banker who served as president of the Virginia Chamber of Commerce and the State-Planters Bank and Trust Company.

== Early life ==
Julien Harrison Hill was born on September 15, 1877, in Richmond, Virginia, to Frances Cadwallader (née Harrison) and William M. Hill. His father was a bank president. Hill attended public schools in Richmond and McCabe's School. He attended the University of Virginia.

== Career ==
In 1915, Hill was president of the Amateur Baseball Association of Richmond. For six years, he was stroke on the crew of the Virginia Boat Club. Hill was colonel on the staff of Governor Henry Carter Stuart. He was president of the Virginia Chamber of Commerce from 1931 to 1932 and later served as director. He served various roles with the American Bankers' Association and was on its executive council. He was also active with the Virginia Bankers' Association. He was elected president of the Richmond Clearing House in 1937.

In 1898, Hill was a runner for the State Bank. In 1918, he was elected president of the National State and City Bank. He remained president when the bank merged with the State-Planters Bank and Trust Company. He served as president until June 1941. He then served as chairman of the board until his death.

== Personal life ==
Hill had one son and six daughters, William M., Mrs. Richard R. Patterson Jr., Mrs. Henry C. DeRham, Lucy, Mildred, Mrs. Harry Bishop and Mrs. Philip Bowers. He was a vestryman of St. Paul's Episcopal Church.

Hill died on December 1, 1943, at his home at Monroe Terrace Apartments in Richmond. He was buried in Hollywood Cemetery.

== Head coaching record ==
Year	Team	Overall	Conference	Standing	Bowl/playoffs
Richmond Spiders (Independent) (1899)
1899	Richmond	2–2			
Richmond:		2–2			
Total:		2–2			
