= William H. Burke =

American football coach

Coaching career (HC unless noted)
- 1899: William & Mary
- 1905–1906: St. Bonaventure

Head coaching record
- Overall: 5–3

William H. Burke was an American college football coach. He served as the head coach football at the College of William & Mary for one season in 1899, compiling a record of 2–3. After leaving William & Mary, Burke coached for two seasons at St. Bonaventure University in Allegany, New York. His teams went 1–0 in 1905 and 2–0 in 1906.

== Head coaching record ==
Year	Team	Overall	Conference	Standing	Bowl/playoffs
William & Mary Orange and White (Independent) (1899)
1899	William & Mary	2–3			
William & Mary:		2–3			
St. Bonaventure Brown and White (Independent) (1905–1906)
1905	St. Bonaventure	1–0			
1906	St. Bonaventure	2–0			
St. Bonaventure:		3–0			
Total:		5–3			
