= George Krebs =

American football player and coach (1872–1939)

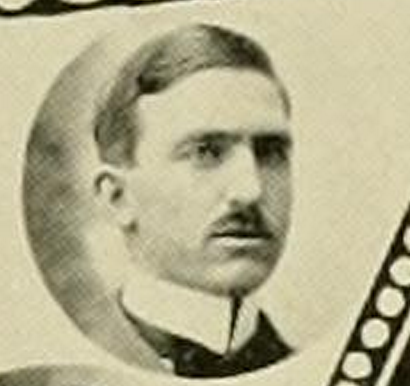
- Krebs pictured in The Monticola, West Virginia yearbook

Biographical details
- Born: March 5, 1872; New Martinsville, West Virginia, U.S.
- Died: May 8, 1939 (aged 67); Charleston, West Virginia, U.S.

Playing career
- 1894–1898: West Virginia
- 1898: Latrobe Athletic Association
- 1898: Western Pennsylvania All-Stars
- Position: Guard

Coaching career (HC unless noted)
- 1897: West Virginia

Head coaching record
- Overall: 5–4–1

George R. Krebs (March 5, 1872 – May 8, 1939) was an American football player and coach. He served as the fifth head football coach at West Virginia University in Morgantown, West Virginia and he held that position for the 1897 season, in which he also captained the team. His coaching record at West Virginia was 5–4–1. A native of New Martinsville, Krebs graduated from West Virginia University in 1899 in with a degree in engineering.

Krebs also played professional football during this period for the Latrobe Athletic Association and was even a member of the 1898 Western Pennsylvania All-Star football team. He died in 1939 of heart problems.

== Head coaching record ==
Year	Team	Overall	Conference	Standing	Bowl/playoffs
West Virginia Mountaineers (Independent) (1897)
1897	West Virginia	5–4–1			
West Virginia:		5–4–1			
Total:		5–4–1			
