= 1899 Johns Hopkins Blue Jays football team =

American college football season

1899 Johns Hopkins Blue Jays football

MIFA champion
- Conference: Maryland Intercollegiate Football Association
- Record: 4–2 (3–1 MIFA)
- Head coach: Thorson Bond (1st season)

1899 Maryland Intercollegiate Football Association standings
	Conf.					Overall
Team	W		L		T	W		L		T
Johns Hopkins $	3	–	1	–	0	4	–	2	–	0
$ – Conference champion

The 1899 Johns Hopkins Blue Jays football team represented Johns Hopkins University during the 1899 college football season.

== Schedule ==
Date	Time	Opponent	Site	Result	Attendance	Source
October 14		Rock Hill College	Union Park; Baltimore, MD	W 19–0		
October 21		at Swarthmore	Whittier Field; Swarthmore, PA	L 0–22		
October 28		Maryland	Union Park; Baltimore, MD	W 40–0		
November 4		at Western Maryland	Westminster, MD	W 12–0		
November 25	3:00 p.m.	St. John's (MD)	Union Park; Baltimore, MD	W 11–0	1,200	
November 30		Maryland	Union Park; Baltimore, MD	L 0–12	1,500	
All times are in Eastern time
