= R. H. Hamilton =

American football coach

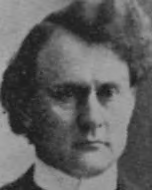

Biographical details
- Born: December 25, 1873; Corsicana, Texas, U.S.
- Died: June 15, 1946 (aged 72); Port Lavaca, Texas, U.S.

Coaching career (HC unless noted)
- 1899–1900: Baylor

Head coaching record
- Overall: 5–1–1

Robert Houston Hamilton (December 25, 1873 – June 15, 1946) was an American college football coach, law professor, and judge. He was the first head football coach at Baylor University, serving from 1899 to 1900 and compiling a record of 5–1–1.

Hamilton graduated from Baylor's law department in 1899 and joined the faculty of Baylor Law School in 1900. After leaving Baylor, he moved to Port Lavaca, Texas, where he served as a county judge before attending the University of Chicago. In 1921, he was elected to the Texas Supreme Court. Hamilton died on June 15, 1946, at his home in Port Lavaca.

== Head coaching record ==
Year	Team	Overall	Conference	Standing	Bowl/playoffs
Baylor (Independent) (1899–1900)
1899	Baylor	2–1–1			
1900	Baylor	3–0			
Baylor:		5–1–1			
Total:		5–1–1			
