= 1899 West Virginia Mountaineers football team =

American college football season

1899 West Virginia Mountaineers football
- Conference: Independent
- Record: 2–3
- Head coach: Lewis Yeager (1st season)
- Captain: A. C. Chapman

1899 Southern college football independents records
| | Conf. | | | Overall |
| Team | W | L | T | W | | L | | T |
|---|---|---|---|---|---|---|---|---|
| VMI | | – | | 1 | – | 0 | – | 0 |
| VPI | | – | | 4 | – | 1 | – | 0 |
| Delaware | | – | | 6 | – | 2 | – | 0 |
| Arkansas | | – | | 3 | – | 1 | – | 1 |
| Georgetown | | – | | 5 | – | 2 | – | 1 |
| Texas A&M | | – | | 4 | – | 2 | – | 0 |
| Oklahoma | | – | | 2 | – | 1 | – | 0 |
| Baylor | | – | | 2 | – | 1 | – | 1 |
| Guilford | | – | | 2 | – | 1 | – | 1 |
| Navy | | – | | 5 | – | 3 | – | 0 |
| Virginia | | – | | 4 | – | 3 | – | 2 |
| Add-Ran | | – | | 0 | – | 0 | – | 1 |
| Richmond | | – | | 2 | – | 2 | – | 0 |
| South Carolina | | – | | 2 | – | 3 | – | 0 |
| West Virginia | | – | | 2 | – | 3 | – | 0 |
| William & Mary | | – | | 2 | – | 3 | – | 0 |
| North Carolina A&M | | – | | 1 | – | 2 | – | 2 |
| Davidson | | – | | 1 | – | 3 | – | 1 |
| Maryland | | – | | 1 | – | 4 | – | 0 |
| Marshall | | – | | 0 | – | 0 | – | 1 |

The 1899 West Virginia Mountaineers football team was an American football team that represented West Virginia University as an independent during the 1899 college football season. In its first season under head coach Lewis Yeager, the team compiled a 2–3 record and was outscored by a total of 78 to 28. A. C. Chapman was the team captain.

== Schedule ==
| Date | Time | Opponent | Site | Result | Attendance | Source |
|---|---|---|---|---|---|---|
| October 11 | | Grove City | Morgantown, WV | W 6–0 | | |
| October 21 | 3:50 p.m. | at Washington & Jefferson | College Park; Washington, PA | L 0–29 | 400 | |
| October 23 | | at Marietta | Marietta, OH | L 5–23 | | |
| November 4 | | vs. Waynesburg | Clarksburg, WV | W 17–6 | | |
| November 30 | | at Waynesburg | Waynesburg, PA | L 0–20 | | |
All times are in Eastern time
