= 1899 Richmond Spiders football team =

American college football season

1899 Richmond Spiders football
- Conference: Independent
- Record: 2–2
- Head coach: Julien Hill (1st season)
- Captain: Samuel M. Stone
- Home stadium: Broad Street Park

1899 Southern college football independents records
	Conf.			Overall
Team	W	L	T	W		L		T
VMI		–		1	–	0	–	0
VPI		–		4	–	1	–	0
Delaware		–		6	–	2	–	0
Arkansas		–		3	–	1	–	1
Georgetown		–		5	–	2	–	1
Texas A&M		–		4	–	2	–	0
Oklahoma		–		2	–	1	–	0
Baylor		–		2	–	1	–	1
Guilford		–		2	–	1	–	1
Navy		–		5	–	3	–	0
Virginia		–		4	–	3	–	2
Add-Ran		–		0	–	0	–	1
Richmond		–		2	–	2	–	0
South Carolina		–		2	–	3	–	0
West Virginia		–		2	–	3	–	0
William & Mary		–		2	–	3	–	0
North Carolina A&M		–		1	–	2	–	2
Davidson		–		1	–	3	–	1
Maryland		–		1	–	4	–	0
Marshall		–		0	–	0	–	1

The 1899 Richmond Spiders football team was an American football team that represented Richmond College—now known as the University of Richmond—as an independent during the 1899 college football season. Led by Julien Hill in his first and only year as head coach, Richmond compiled a record of 2–2.

== Schedule ==
Date	Time	Opponent	Site	Result	Attendance	Source
October 14	4:00 p.m.	at Portsmouth A.C.	Columbia Park; Portsmouth, VA	L 0–16		
October 19	4:00 p.m.	Pantops Academy	Broad Street Park; Richmond, VA	W 16–0	300	
October 21		William & Mary	Broad Street Park; Richmond, VA (rivalry)	W 41–0		
October 28	3:30 p.m.	Hampden–Sydney	Broad Street Park; Richmond, VA	L 5–17		
