= Lewis Yeager =

American football coach

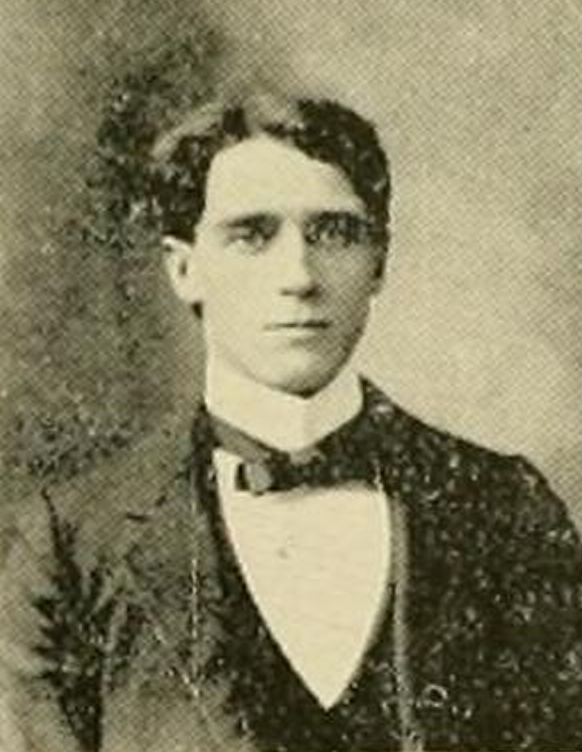
- Yeager pictured in The Monticola, West Virginia yearbook

Biographical details
- Born: September 10, 1878; Marlinton, West Virginia, U.S.
- Died: December 10, 1906 (aged 28); Morgantown, West Virginia, U.S.

Playing career
- 1896–1899: West Virginia
- 1900: Latrobe Athletic Association
- Position: Fullback

Coaching career (HC unless noted)
- 1899: West Virginia
- 1901: West Virginia

Head coaching record
- Overall: 5–5

Lewis Armstrong Yeager, first name sometimes spelled Louis (September 10, 1878 – December 10, 1906) was an American college football player and coach and lawyer. He was the seventh head football coach at West Virginia University in Morgantown, West Virginia, serving for two seasons, in 1899 and 1901, compiling a record of 5–5. Yeager also played football at West Virginia as a fullback from 1896 to 1899, and was captain of the 1898 West Virginia Mountaineers football team. Following graduation, he played professional football for the 1900 Latrobe team.

Yeager practiced law in Morgantown from 1901 until his death in 1906. He died on December 10, 1906, of heart disease, following a brief illness. He is interred at Oak Grove Cemetery in Morgantown.

== Head coaching record ==
Year	Team	Overall	Conference	Standing	Bowl/playoffs
West Virginia Mountaineers (Independent) (1899)
1899	West Virginia	2–3			
West Virginia Mountaineers (Independent) (1901)
1901	West Virginia	3–2			
West Virginia:		5–5			
Total:		5–5			
