= 1899 Marshall Thundering Herd football team =

American college football season

1899 Marshall Thundering Herd football
- Conference: Independent
- Record: 0–0–1
- Head coach: None
- Home stadium: Central Field

1899 Southern college football independents records
	Conf.			Overall
Team	W	L	T	W		L		T
VMI		–		1	–	0	–	0
VPI		–		4	–	1	–	0
Delaware		–		6	–	2	–	0
Arkansas		–		3	–	1	–	1
Georgetown		–		5	–	2	–	1
Texas A&M		–		4	–	2	–	0
Oklahoma		–		2	–	1	–	0
Baylor		–		2	–	1	–	1
Guilford		–		2	–	1	–	1
Navy		–		5	–	3	–	0
Virginia		–		4	–	3	–	2
Add-Ran		–		0	–	0	–	1
Richmond		–		2	–	2	–	0
South Carolina		–		2	–	3	–	0
West Virginia		–		2	–	3	–	0
William & Mary		–		2	–	3	–	0
North Carolina A&M		–		1	–	2	–	2
Davidson		–		1	–	3	–	1
Maryland		–		1	–	4	–	0
Marshall		–		0	–	0	–	1

The 1899 Marshall Thundering Herd football team represented Marshall University as an independent during the 1899 college football season. The team did not have a coach, and tied their lone game 0–0, marking the only time in school history that no points have been scored by Marshall or their opponents in an entire season.

The 1899 season marked the first undefeated season in Marshall school history, despite also being a winless season.

== Schedule ==
Date	Opponent	Site	Result
November 30	at Catlettsburg^{†}	Clyffeside Park; Catlettsburg, KY	T 0–0
^{†}Homecoming

== Game summaries ==
=== At Catlettsburg ===
Marshall at Catlettsburg (homecoming)

Team	1	2	Total
Marshall	0	0	0
Catlettsburg	0	0	0

- Date: November 30
- Location: Catlettsburg, KY

As it was the only game of the season, the Catlettsburg game was denoted as Marshall's homecoming despite being an away game. Due to the Spanish–American War, it is reported that the Marshall team may have been made up of both current and former Marshall players.
