= Charles Firth (coach) =

American football player and sports coach

Playing career

Football
- 1896: Chicago

Coaching career (HC unless noted)

Football
- 1897: VPI
- 1913: Hillsdale

Basketball
- 1911–1912: Central (IA)
- 1913–1914: Hillsdale

Baseball
- 1914: Hillsdale

Head coaching record
- Overall: 7–5–1 (football); 7–11 (basketball); 1–10–1 (baseball)

Charles S. Firth was an American football player and coach of football, basketball, and baseball. He served as the head football coach at Virginia Agricultural and Mechanical College and Polytechnic Institute (VPI)—now known as Virginia Tech—for one season in 1897 and at Hillsdale College for one season in 1913, compiling a career college football coaching record of 7–5–1. Firth was an alumnus of the University of Chicago.

== Head coaching record ==
=== Football ===
Year	Team	Overall	Conference	Standing	Bowl/playoffs
VPI (Independent) (1897)
1897	VPI	5–2			
VPI:		5–2			
Hillsdale Dales (Michigan Intercollegiate Athletic Association) (1913)
1913	Hillsdale	2–3–1	2–1–1	T–2nd	
Hillsdale:		2–3–1	2–1–1		
Total:		7–5–1			
