= 1899 Georgetown Blue and Gray football team =

American college football season

1899 Georgetown Blue and Gray football
- Conference: Independent
- Record: 5–2–1
- Head coach: William W. Church (1st season)
- Captain: Carlos A. Long
- Home stadium: Georgetown Field

1899 Southern college football independents records
	Conf.			Overall
Team	W	L	T	W		L		T
VMI		–		1	–	0	–	0
VPI		–		4	–	1	–	0
Delaware		–		6	–	2	–	0
Arkansas		–		3	–	1	–	1
Georgetown		–		5	–	2	–	1
Texas A&M		–		4	–	2	–	0
Oklahoma		–		2	–	1	–	0
Baylor		–		2	–	1	–	1
Guilford		–		2	–	1	–	1
Navy		–		5	–	3	–	0
Virginia		–		4	–	3	–	2
Add-Ran		–		0	–	0	–	1
Richmond		–		2	–	2	–	0
South Carolina		–		2	–	3	–	0
West Virginia		–		2	–	3	–	0
William & Mary		–		2	–	3	–	0
North Carolina A&M		–		1	–	2	–	2
Davidson		–		1	–	3	–	1
Maryland		–		1	–	4	–	0
Marshall		–		0	–	0	–	1

The 1899 Georgetown Blue and Gray football team represented Georgetown University as an independent during the 1899 college football season. Led by first-year head coach William W. Church, Georgetown compiled an overall record of 5–2–1.

== Schedule ==
Date	Opponent	Site	Result	Attendance	Source
October 14	at Navy	Worden Field; Annapolis, MD	L 0–12		
October 21	St. John's (MD)	Georgetown Field; Washington, DC	W 22–0		
October 25	Baltimore Medical	Georgetown Field; Washington, DC	L 0–16		
November 1	Gallaudet	Georgetown Field; Washington, DC	W 5–0		
November 4	University of Maryland, Baltimore	Georgetown Field; Washington, DC	W 17–0		
November 15	Dickinson	Georgetown Field; Washington, DC	W 5–0		
November 18	Virginia	Georgetown Field; Washington, DC	T 0–0	6,000	
November 30	Baltimore Medical	Georgetown Field; Washington, DC	W 11–5	3,000	
