= 1899 Delaware football team =

American college football season

1899 Delaware football
- Conference: Independent
- Record: 6–2
- Head coach: Herbert Rice (3rd season; first game); Wentz (by late October)

1899 Southern college football independents records
	Conf.			Overall
Team	W	L	T	W		L		T
VMI		–		1	–	0	–	0
VPI		–		4	–	1	–	0
Delaware		–		6	–	2	–	0
Arkansas		–		3	–	1	–	1
Georgetown		–		5	–	2	–	1
Texas A&M		–		4	–	2	–	0
Oklahoma		–		2	–	1	–	0
Baylor		–		2	–	1	–	1
Guilford		–		2	–	1	–	1
Navy		–		5	–	3	–	0
Virginia		–		4	–	3	–	2
Add-Ran		–		0	–	0	–	1
Richmond		–		2	–	2	–	0
South Carolina		–		2	–	3	–	0
West Virginia		–		2	–	3	–	0
William & Mary		–		2	–	3	–	0
North Carolina A&M		–		1	–	2	–	2
Davidson		–		1	–	3	–	1
Maryland		–		1	–	4	–	0
Marshall		–		0	–	0	–	1

The 1899 Delaware football team represented Delaware College—now known as the University of Delaware—as an independent during the 1899 college football season. The team posted a 6–2 record.

Herbert Rice began his third season as the team's head coach but resigned after the first game to play football for the Duquesne Country and Athletic Club of Pittsburgh. By late October, Delaware was being led by a coach Wentz from Princeton, and by early November, By Dickson was coaching along with Wentz. Rice returned from Pittsburgh after Delaware had finished its season.

== Schedule ==
Date	Opponent	Site	Result	Source
September 30	at Wilmington High School	Union Street Grounds; Wilmington, DE	W 5–0	
October 7	Tome Institute	Newark, DE	W 76–0	
October 14	at Pennsylvania Military	Chester, PA	W 23–0	
October 18	at Swarthmore	Whittier Field; Swarthmore, PA	L 0–17	
October 21	Wilmington Conference Academy	Newark, DE	W 56–0	
October 28	Haverford	Newark, DE	L 0–23	
November 8	Maryland	Union Street Grounds; Wilmington, DE	W 34–0	
November 18	at Wilmington Conference Academy	Dover, DE	W 35–0	
