= 1899 Baylor football team =

American college football season

1899 Baylor football
- Conference: Independent
- Record: 2–1–1
- Head coach: R. H. Hamilton (1st season)
- Captain: Tom E. Cranfill
- Home stadium: Baylor campus, West End Park

1899 Southern college football independents records
	Conf.			Overall
Team	W	L	T	W		L		T
VMI		–		1	–	0	–	0
VPI		–		4	–	1	–	0
Delaware		–		6	–	2	–	0
Arkansas		–		3	–	1	–	1
Georgetown		–		5	–	2	–	1
Texas A&M		–		4	–	2	–	0
Oklahoma		–		2	–	1	–	0
Baylor		–		2	–	1	–	1
Guilford		–		2	–	1	–	1
Navy		–		5	–	3	–	0
Virginia		–		4	–	3	–	2
Add-Ran		–		0	–	0	–	1
Richmond		–		2	–	2	–	0
South Carolina		–		2	–	3	–	0
West Virginia		–		2	–	3	–	0
William & Mary		–		2	–	3	–	0
North Carolina A&M		–		1	–	2	–	2
Davidson		–		1	–	3	–	1
Maryland		–		1	–	4	–	0
Marshall		–		0	–	0	–	1

The 1899 Baylor Bears football team was an American football team that represented Baylor University as an independent during the 1899 college football season. This was the first football season for Baylor. Under head coach R. H. Hamilton, the team played all four games at home in Waco, Texas, compiling a 2–1–1 record. Initially, Baylor played its home games on an undetermined field near the university. Baylor played its first game against Texas A&M, which would become a rivalry, the Battle of the Brazos, with over 100 games played in the series by 2003.

== Schedule ==
Date	Time	Opponent	Site	Result	Source
October 23		Toby's Practical Business College	Waco, TX	W 6–0	
October 24		Add-Ran Christian	Baylor campus; Waco, TX (rivalry)	T 0–0	
November 11		Toby's Practical Business College	West End Park; Waco, TX	W 20–0	
November 30	3:30 p.m.	Texas A&M	West End Park; Waco, TX (rivalry)	L 0–33	
