= 1899 VMI Keydets football team =

American college football season

1899 VMI Keydets football
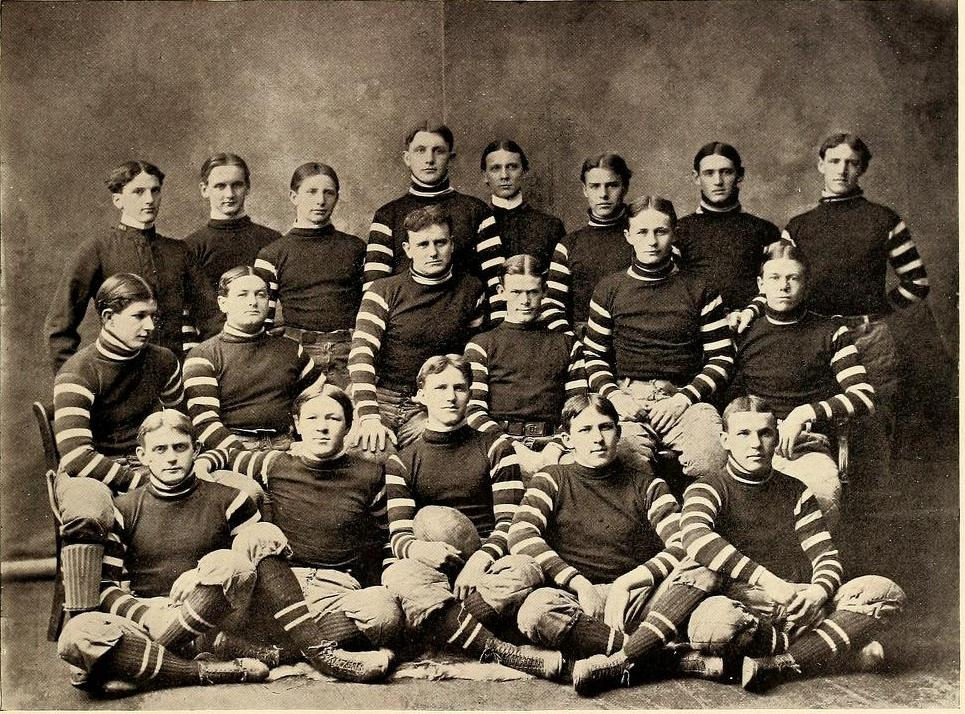
- Conference: Independent
- Record: 1–0
- Head coach: Sam Boyle (2nd season)

1899 Southern college football independents records
	Conf.			Overall
Team	W	L	T	W		L		T
VMI		–		1	–	0	–	0
VPI		–		4	–	1	–	0
Delaware		–		6	–	2	–	0
Arkansas		–		3	–	1	–	1
Georgetown		–		5	–	2	–	1
Texas A&M		–		4	–	2	–	0
Oklahoma		–		2	–	1	–	0
Baylor		–		2	–	1	–	1
Guilford		–		2	–	1	–	1
Navy		–		5	–	3	–	0
Virginia		–		4	–	3	–	2
Add-Ran		–		0	–	0	–	1
Richmond		–		2	–	2	–	0
South Carolina		–		2	–	3	–	0
West Virginia		–		2	–	3	–	0
William & Mary		–		2	–	3	–	0
North Carolina A&M		–		1	–	2	–	2
Davidson		–		1	–	3	–	1
Maryland		–		1	–	4	–	0
Marshall		–		0	–	0	–	1

The 1899 VMI Keydets football team represented the Virginia Military Institute (VMI) in their ninth season of organized football. Sam Boyle coached his second season for the Keydets, which featured only one game—a 39–0 win over Washington and Lee. Although the team only played one game in mid-October, the squad was assembled for practice in early September.

The 1899 football season at VMI was cut short by an outbreak of typhoid fever on the campus. As reported by one account: "VMI had time to crush only Washington and Lee 39–0 before the 1899 season was abruptly ended by an outbreak of typhoid fever which closed the Institute for six weeks." On October 16, 1899, all 250 cadets were sent to their homes on account of the outbreak. At least one cadet died in the outbreak, and the school was not re-opened until November 28, 1899—after the football season had ended.

VMI's sole opponent for the year, Washington and Lee, finished the season with a record of 0–4–1. The "Keydets" of VMI handed their one opponent the biggest defeat (by score) of the season.

In the lone game of the season, W. B. "Bruce" Montgomery Jr., the captain and quarterback for VMI, scored a touchdown on an 80-yard carry. Montgomery would go on to the next season to be team captain and assist with coaching duties.

One of the individuals who played for the VMI football team in 1899 and 1900 was George C. Marshall, who went on to be Chief of Staff of the Army, Secretary of State, and Secretary of Defense.

== Schedule ==
Date	Opponent	Site	Result
October 11	Washington and Lee	Unknown; Lexington, VA	W 39–0
