= Herbert Rice =

American football coach

Biographical details
- Born: March 10, 1876; Wilmington, Delaware, U.S.
- Died: December 30, 1932 (aged 56); Claymont, Delaware, U.S.

Coaching career (HC unless noted)
- 1897–1901: Delaware

Head coaching record
- Overall: 11–18–4

Herbert Leigh Rice (March 10, 1876 – December 30, 1932) was an American college football head coach who was Delaware football program's second head coach. He compiled a 11–18–4 record from 1897 through 1901. During the 1899 season, he played quarterback and halfback for the professional Duquesne Country and Athletic Club of Pittsburgh. Rice was later a prominent judge in Delaware. He died of a heart attack in 1932.

== Head coaching record ==
Year	Team	Overall	Conference	Standing	Bowl/playoffs
Delaware (Independent) (1897–1901)
1897	Delaware	1−5−1			
1898	Delaware	2–5–2			
1899	Delaware	1–0 (Note: Rice resigned after the first game of the 1899 season (vs. Wilmington High School) to play football for the Duquesne Country and Athletic Club of Pittsburgh. He returned from Pittsburgh in December, after Delaware's season was over.)			
1900	Delaware	2–4–1			
1901	Delaware	5–4			
Delaware:		11–18–4			
Total:		11–18–4			
