= 1899 Guilford Quakers football team =

American college football season

1899 Guilford Quakers football
- Conference: Independent
- Record: 2–1–1
- Head coach: Herbert C. Petty (1st season)

1899 Southern college football independents records
	Conf.			Overall
Team	W	L	T	W		L		T
VMI		–		1	–	0	–	0
VPI		–		4	–	1	–	0
Delaware		–		6	–	2	–	0
Arkansas		–		3	–	1	–	1
Georgetown		–		5	–	2	–	1
Texas A&M		–		4	–	2	–	0
Oklahoma		–		2	–	1	–	0
Baylor		–		2	–	1	–	1
Guilford		–		2	–	1	–	1
Navy		–		5	–	3	–	0
Virginia		–		4	–	3	–	2
Add-Ran		–		0	–	0	–	1
Richmond		–		2	–	2	–	0
South Carolina		–		2	–	3	–	0
West Virginia		–		2	–	3	–	0
William & Mary		–		2	–	3	–	0
North Carolina A&M		–		1	–	2	–	2
Davidson		–		1	–	3	–	1
Maryland		–		1	–	4	–	0
Marshall		–		0	–	0	–	1

The 1899 Guilford Quakers football team represented Guilford College as an independent during the 1897 college football season. Led by head coach Herbert C. Petty, the Quakers compiled a record of 2–1–1.

== Schedule ==
Date	Opponent	Site	Result	Source
October 6	Bingham Academy	Greensboro, NC	W 6–5	
October 14	at North Carolina	Chapel Hill, NC	L 0–45	
November 9	at North Carolina A&M	Raleigh, NC	T 0–0	
November 10	at Bingham Academy	Mebane, NC	W 6–0	
