= 1899 Oklahoma Sooners football team =

American college football season

1899 Oklahoma Sooners football
- Conference: Independent
- Record: 2–1
- Head coach: Vernon Louis Parrington (3rd season)
- Captain: C. C. Roberts

1899 Southern college football independents records
| | Conf. | | | Overall |
| Team | W | L | T | W | | L | | T |
|---|---|---|---|---|---|---|---|---|
| VMI | | – | | 1 | – | 0 | – | 0 |
| VPI | | – | | 4 | – | 1 | – | 0 |
| Delaware | | – | | 6 | – | 2 | – | 0 |
| Arkansas | | – | | 3 | – | 1 | – | 1 |
| Georgetown | | – | | 5 | – | 2 | – | 1 |
| Texas A&M | | – | | 4 | – | 2 | – | 0 |
| Oklahoma | | – | | 2 | – | 1 | – | 0 |
| Baylor | | – | | 2 | – | 1 | – | 1 |
| Guilford | | – | | 2 | – | 1 | – | 1 |
| Navy | | – | | 5 | – | 3 | – | 0 |
| Virginia | | – | | 4 | – | 3 | – | 2 |
| Add-Ran | | – | | 0 | – | 0 | – | 1 |
| Richmond | | – | | 2 | – | 2 | – | 0 |
| South Carolina | | – | | 2 | – | 3 | – | 0 |
| West Virginia | | – | | 2 | – | 3 | – | 0 |
| William & Mary | | – | | 2 | – | 3 | – | 0 |
| North Carolina A&M | | – | | 1 | – | 2 | – | 2 |
| Davidson | | – | | 1 | – | 3 | – | 1 |
| Maryland | | – | | 1 | – | 4 | – | 0 |
| Marshall | | – | | 0 | – | 0 | – | 1 |

The 1899 Oklahoma Sooners football team represented the University of Oklahoma as an independent during the 1899 college football season. In their fifth year of football, and third year under head coach Vernon Louis Parrington, the Sooners compiled a 2–1 record, and outscored their opponents by a combined total of 61 to 28. This season was the first in which the team played a current NCAA Division I Football Bowl Subdivision opponent, Arkansas.

== Schedule ==
| Date | Time | Opponent | Site | Result | Source |
|---|---|---|---|---|---|
| October 20 | 3:30 p.m. | Kingfisher | Norman, Oklahoma Territory | W 39–6 | |
| October 28 | | vs. Arkansas | Shawnee, Oklahoma Territory | W 11–5 | |
| November 30 | | Arkansas City Town Team | University campus; Norman, Oklahoma Territory | L 11–17 | |
