= 1899 South Carolina Gamecocks football team =

American college football season

1899 South Carolina Gamecocks football
- Conference: Independent
- Record: 2–3
- Head coach: Irving O. Hunt (1st season)
- Captain: W. M. Shand
- Home stadium: South Carolina College athletic field

1899 Southern college football independents records
	Conf.			Overall
Team	W	L	T	W		L		T
VMI		–		1	–	0	–	0
VPI		–		4	–	1	–	0
Delaware		–		6	–	2	–	0
Arkansas		–		3	–	1	–	1
Georgetown		–		5	–	2	–	1
Texas A&M		–		4	–	2	–	0
Oklahoma		–		2	–	1	–	0
Baylor		–		2	–	1	–	1
Guilford		–		2	–	1	–	1
Navy		–		5	–	3	–	0
Virginia		–		4	–	3	–	2
Add-Ran		–		0	–	0	–	1
Richmond		–		2	–	2	–	0
South Carolina		–		2	–	3	–	0
West Virginia		–		2	–	3	–	0
William & Mary		–		2	–	3	–	0
North Carolina A&M		–		1	–	2	–	2
Davidson		–		1	–	3	–	1
Maryland		–		1	–	4	–	0
Marshall		–		0	–	0	–	1

The 1899 South Carolina Jaguars football team represented South Carolina College—now known as the University of South Carolina–as an independent during the 1899 college football season. Led by first-year head coach Irving O. Hunt, South Carolina compiled a record of 2–3.

== Schedule ==
Date	Time	Opponent	Site	Result	Source
October 14		Columbia Y	South Carolina College athletic field; Columbia, SC	W 4–0	
November 9	11:00 a.m.	Clemson	Columbia, SC (Big Thursday)	L 0–34	
November 15	4:12 p.m.	Bingham	Columbia, SC	W 11–5	
November 22		at Bingham	French Broad gridiron; Asheville, NC	L 6–18	
November 30	3:45 p.m.	vs. Davidson	Latta Park Baseball Field; Charlotte, NC	L 0–5	
All times are in Eastern time
