= Archie Hoxton =

American football player, coach, and educator (1875–1951)

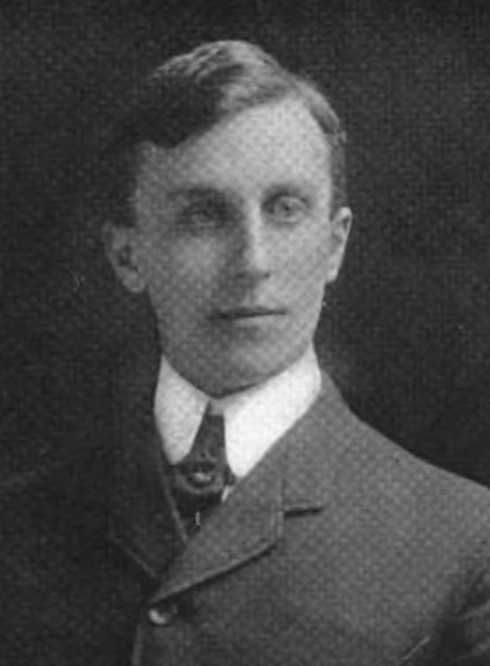
- Hoxton pictured in Corks and Curls 1916, Virginia yearbook

Biographical details
- Born: June 28, 1875; Alexandria, Virginia, U.S.
- Died: October 14, 1951 (aged 76); Alexandria, Virginia, U.S.

Playing career
- 1895–1896: Virginia
- Position: Quarterback

Coaching career (HC unless noted)
- 1899–1900: Virginia

Head coaching record
- Overall: 11–5–3

Archibald Robinson Hoxton (June 28, 1875 – October 14, 1951) was an American college football player, coach, and educator. He served as the head football coach at the University of Virginia from 1899 to 1900, compiling a record of 11–5–3. Hoxton played football at Virginia from 1895 to 1896.

== Head coaching record ==
Year	Team	Overall	Conference	Standing	Bowl/playoffs
Virginia Orange and Blue (Independent) (1899–1900)
1899	Virginia	4–3–2			
1900	Virginia	7–2–1			
Virginia:		11–5–3			
Total:		11–5–3			
