= Irving O. Hunt =

American football player and coach (1878–1951)

Biographical details
- Born: January 30, 1878; Providence, Rhode Island, U.S.
- Died: June 17, 1951 (aged 73); Kingston, Pennsylvania, U.S.

Playing career
- 1897–1898: Brown
- 1901: Homestead Library & Athletic Club

Coaching career (HC unless noted)
- 1899–1900: South Carolina

Administrative career (AD unless noted)
- 1899–1901: South Carolina

Head coaching record
- Overall: 5–7

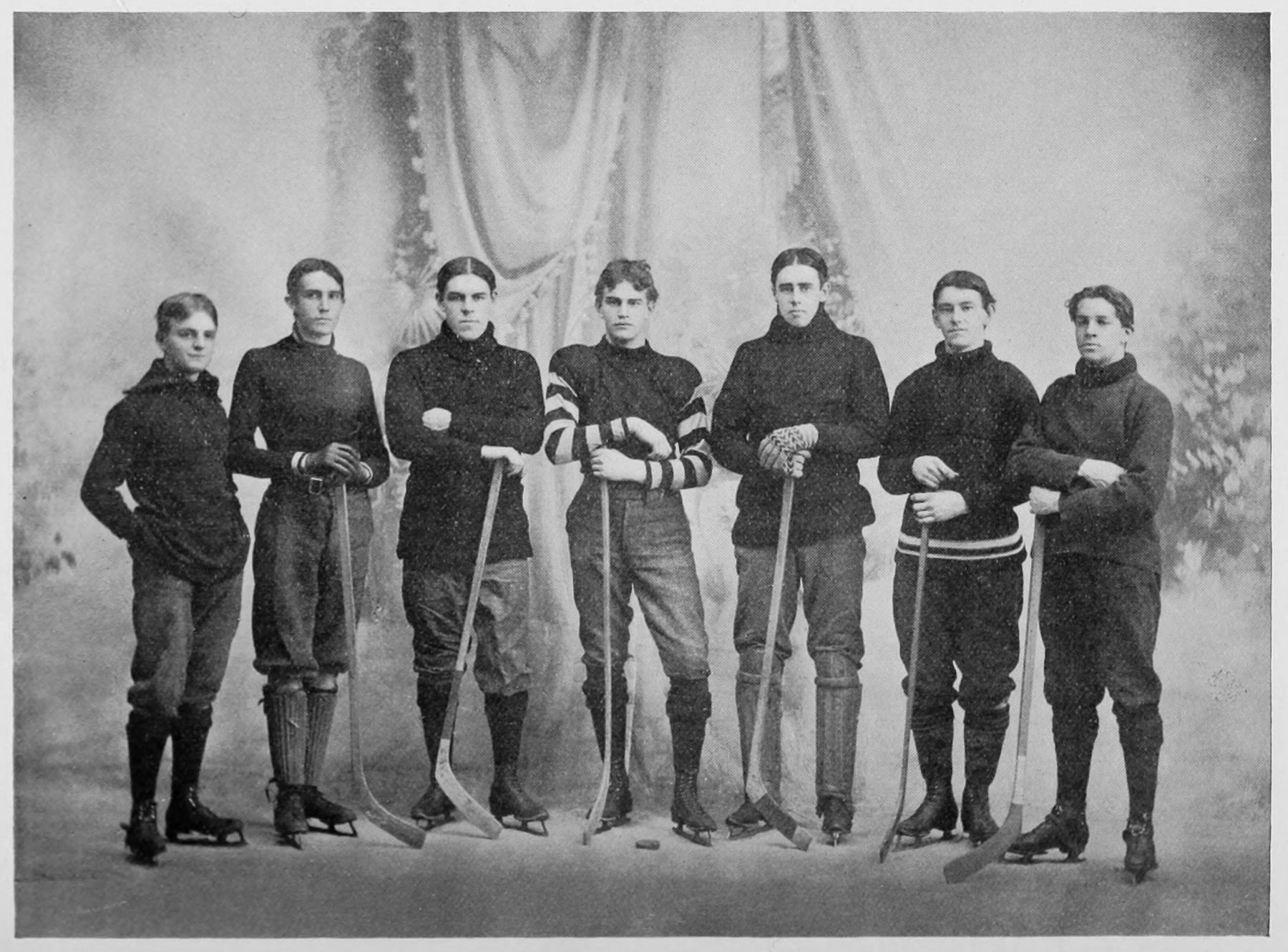
Irving Hunt, in the middle with a football sweater and shoulder protection, with the 1898 ice hockey team of Brown University.

Irving Owen "Hoppy" Hunt (January 30, 1878 – June 17, 1951) was an American college football and professional football player and coach. He served as the head football coach at the University of South Carolina at Columbia, South Carolina from 1899 to 1900, compiling a record of 5–7.

== Ice hockey career ==
While a student at Brown University, in his home city of Providence, Rhode Island, Hunt took part in the first intercollegiate ice hockey games the university played in when Brown's ice hockey team appeared against Harvard at Franklin Field in Boston on January 19, 1898. Hunt, a forward, scored three goals in four intercollegiate games for Brown University during the 1897–98 season and also played for the team during the 1898–99 campaign.

== Late life and death ==
Hunt graduated from Harvard Law School and practiced law in Providence, Rhode Island for 12 years, until 1917, when he moved to Wyoming, Pennsylvania, where he farmed. He died on June 17, 1951, at Nesbitt Hospital in Kingston, Pennsylvania after suffering a fall four hours earlier at his home in Wyoming.

== Head coaching record ==
Year	Team	Overall	Conference	Standing	Bowl/playoffs
South Carolina Gamecocks (Independent) (1899–1900)
1899	South Carolina	2–3			
1900	South Carolina	4–3			
South Carolina:		5–7			
Total:		5–7			
