= B. N. Wilson =

American professor, engineer, and football coach

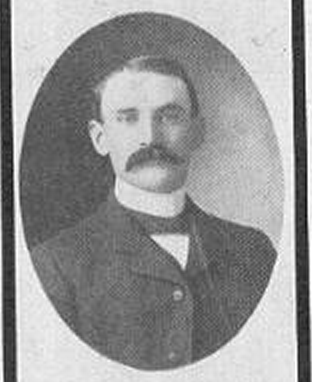
- Wilson pictured in a 1908 University of Arkansas publication

Biographical details
- Born: November 16, 1874; Philadelphia, New York, U.S.
- Died: January 27, 1948 (aged 73); Fayetteville, Arkansas, U.S.

Coaching career (HC unless noted)
- 1897–1898: Arkansas Industrial

Head coaching record
- Overall: 4–1–1

Birton Neill Wilson (November 16, 1874 – January 27, 1948) was an American professor, engineer, and college football coach. He served as a professor of mechanical engineering and the head football coach at Arkansas Industrial University (now known as the University of Arkansas).

== Biography ==
Wilson was born in Philadelphia in 1874. Residing in Fayetteville, Arkansas, Wilson attended the Georgia School of Technology where he earned a Bachelor of Science in mechanical engineering in 1896. Wilson was elected president of his senior class and "always maintained a high standing in college." He was a member of the American Society of Mechanical Engineers and the Alpha Tau chapter of Kappa Sigma. After graduation, Wilson began teaching at the University of Arkansas as an instructor in mechanical engineering until 1899.

From 1897 to 1898, Wilson coached the Arkansas football team and over the course of two seasons amassed a record of 4–1–1. Later in his life, Wilson enjoyed recalling a quote from a partisan newspaper after his team played Fort Smith: "Thugs, pug-uglies, and roughnecks. Such are B. N. Wilson and the University of Arkansas football team."

From 1899 until 1902, he was an adjunct professor of mechanical engineering and assistant superintendent of mechanical arts. In 1902, the University of Arkansas promoted him to the post of professor of mechanical engineering. In 1903, he studied at the University of Michigan, and eventually received a master of engineering degree from Michigan in 1909. By 1908, he was the superintendent of mechanical arts. He received an M.M.E. degree from Cornell University. He taught at the University of Arkansas until 1923.

Wilson died suddenly at his Fayetteville home on January 27, 1948.

== Head coaching record ==
| Year | Team | Overall | Conference | Standing | Bowl/playoffs |
|---|---|---|---|---|---|
Arkansas Industrial Cardinals (Independent) (1897–1898)
| 1897 | Arkansas Industrial | 2–0–1 | | | |
| 1898 | Arkansas Industrial | 2–1 | | | |
| Arkansas Industrial: | | 4–1–1 | | | |
| Total: | | 4–1–1 | | | |
