= 1899 North Carolina A&M Aggies football team =

American college football season

1899 North Carolina A&M Aggies football
- Conference: Independent
- Record: 1–2–2
- Head coach: W. C. Riddick (2nd season)

1899 Southern college football independents records
	Conf.			Overall
Team	W	L	T	W		L		T
VMI		–		1	–	0	–	0
VPI		–		4	–	1	–	0
Delaware		–		6	–	2	–	0
Arkansas		–		3	–	1	–	1
Georgetown		–		5	–	2	–	1
Texas A&M		–		4	–	2	–	0
Oklahoma		–		2	–	1	–	0
Baylor		–		2	–	1	–	1
Guilford		–		2	–	1	–	1
Navy		–		5	–	3	–	0
Virginia		–		4	–	3	–	2
Add-Ran		–		0	–	0	–	1
Richmond		–		2	–	2	–	0
South Carolina		–		2	–	3	–	0
West Virginia		–		2	–	3	–	0
William & Mary		–		2	–	3	–	0
North Carolina A&M		–		1	–	2	–	2
Davidson		–		1	–	3	–	1
Maryland		–		1	–	4	–	0
Marshall		–		0	–	0	–	1

The 1899 North Carolina A&M Aggies football team represented the North Carolina A&M Aggies of North Carolina College of Agriculture and Mechanic Arts (now known as North Carolina State University) during the 1899 college football season. In W. C. Riddick's second season at head coach the Aggies compiling a record of 1–2–2, scored 29 points on their opponents and allowing 69.

== Schedule ==
Date	Opponent	Site	Result	Source
October 7	at North Carolina	Campus Athletic Field; Chapel Hill, NC (rivalry)	L 0–34	
October 20	William Bingham School	State Fairgrounds; Raleigh, NC	W 18–0	
October 28	North Carolina	State Fairgrounds; Raleigh, NC	T 11–11	
November 17	vs. Davidson	Latta Park Baseball Field; Charlotte, NC	T 0–0	
November 18	vs. Clemson	Rock Hill, SC (rivalry)	L 0–24	
