= 1899 Navy Midshipmen football team =

American college football season

1899 Navy Midshipmen football
- Conference: Independent
- Record: 5–3
- Head coach: Bill Armstrong (3rd season)
- Captain: Ward Wortman
- Home stadium: Worden Field

1899 Southern college football independents records
| | Conf. | | | Overall |
| Team | W | L | T | W | | L | | T |
|---|---|---|---|---|---|---|---|---|
| VMI | | – | | 1 | – | 0 | – | 0 |
| VPI | | – | | 4 | – | 1 | – | 0 |
| Delaware | | – | | 6 | – | 2 | – | 0 |
| Arkansas | | – | | 3 | – | 1 | – | 1 |
| Georgetown | | – | | 5 | – | 2 | – | 1 |
| Texas A&M | | – | | 4 | – | 2 | – | 0 |
| Oklahoma | | – | | 2 | – | 1 | – | 0 |
| Baylor | | – | | 2 | – | 1 | – | 1 |
| Guilford | | – | | 2 | – | 1 | – | 1 |
| Navy | | – | | 5 | – | 3 | – | 0 |
| Virginia | | – | | 4 | – | 3 | – | 2 |
| Add-Ran | | – | | 0 | – | 0 | – | 1 |
| Richmond | | – | | 2 | – | 2 | – | 0 |
| South Carolina | | – | | 2 | – | 3 | – | 0 |
| West Virginia | | – | | 2 | – | 3 | – | 0 |
| William & Mary | | – | | 2 | – | 3 | – | 0 |
| North Carolina A&M | | – | | 1 | – | 2 | – | 2 |
| Davidson | | – | | 1 | – | 3 | – | 1 |
| Maryland | | – | | 1 | – | 4 | – | 0 |
| Marshall | | – | | 0 | – | 0 | – | 1 |

The 1899 Navy Midshipmen football team represented the United States Naval Academy during the 1899 college football season. In their third season under head coach Bill Armstrong, the Midshipmen compiled a 5–3 record, shut out five opponents, and outscored all opponents by a combined score of 94 to 27.

Navy had faced Army on each other's campuses between 1890 and 1893. Through the efforts and diplomacy of Philadelphia surgeon and sportsman Dr. J. William White, it was agreed to resume the series in 1899 at Franklin Field inaugurating the tradition of playing the game in Philadelphia.

== Schedule ==
| Date | Opponent | Site | Result | Source |
|---|---|---|---|---|
| October 7 | Princeton | Worden Field; Annapolis, MD | L 0–5 | |
| October 14 | Georgetown | Worden Field; Annapolis, MD | W 12–0 | |
| October 21 | Penn State | Worden Field; Annapolis, MD | W 6–0 | |
| October 28 | Lafayette | Worden Field; Annapolis, MD | L 0–5 | |
| November 4 | North Carolina | Worden Field; Annapolis, MD | W 12–0 | |
| November 11 | Trinity (CT) | Worden Field; Annapolis, MD | W 35–0 | |
| November 18 | Lehigh | Worden Field; Annapolis, MD | W 24–0 | |
| December 2 | vs. Army | Franklin Field; Philadelphia, PA (Army–Navy Game) | L 5–17 | |
