= 1899 VPI football team =

American college football season

1899 VPI football
- Conference: Independent
- Record: 4–1
- Head coach: James Morrison (1st season)
- Captain: W. F. Cox
- Home stadium: Sheib Field

1899 Southern college football independents records
	Conf.			Overall
Team	W	L	T	W		L		T
VMI		–		1	–	0	–	0
VPI		–		4	–	1	–	0
Delaware		–		6	–	2	–	0
Arkansas		–		3	–	1	–	1
Georgetown		–		5	–	2	–	1
Texas A&M		–		4	–	2	–	0
Oklahoma		–		2	–	1	–	0
Baylor		–		2	–	1	–	1
Guilford		–		2	–	1	–	1
Navy		–		5	–	3	–	0
Virginia		–		4	–	3	–	2
Add-Ran		–		0	–	0	–	1
Richmond		–		2	–	2	–	0
South Carolina		–		2	–	3	–	0
West Virginia		–		2	–	3	–	0
William & Mary		–		2	–	3	–	0
North Carolina A&M		–		1	–	2	–	2
Davidson		–		1	–	3	–	1
Maryland		–		1	–	4	–	0
Marshall		–		0	–	0	–	1

The 1899 VPI football team represented Virginia Agricultural and Mechanical College and Polytechnic Institute in the 1899 college football season. The team was led by their head coach James Morrison and finished with a record of four wins and one loss (4–1).

== Schedule ==
Date	Opponent	Site	Result	Attendance	Source
October 7	St. Albans Lutheran Boys School	Sheib Field; Blacksburg, VA	W 21–0		
October 21	at Tennessee	Baldwin Park; Knoxville, TN	W 5–0	200	
November 11	at Virginia	Madison Hall Field; Charlottesville, VA (rivalry)	L 0–28		
November 18	vs. Roanoke	Athletic Park; Roanoke, VA	W 45–0		
November 30	vs. Washington and Lee	Roanoke, VA	W 35–0	2,500	

== Game summaries ==
=== St. Albans ===
VPI's first game of the season was a victory over St. Albans Lutheran Boys School at Sheib Field.

=== Tennessee ===
After their victory over St. Albans, VPI played the University of Tennessee at Baldwin Park in Knoxville, Tennessee.

=== Cancelled Second game against St. Albans ===
A second game against St. Albans Lutheran Boys School was scheduled to be played on November 4, 1899 in Radford, Virginia, but it was cancelled due to "an injury to a St. Albans man."

=== Virginia ===
VPI at Virginia

Team	1	2	Total
VPI	0	0	0
• UVA	12	16	28

- Date: November 11, 1899
- Location: Madison Hall Field
  Charlottesville, VA
- Referee: Eskridge

The starting lineup for VPI was: Jewell (left end), McCormick (left tackle), Carper (left guard), Montgomery (center), Choice (right guard), Cox (right tackle), Lewis (right end), Bell (quarterback), Huffard (left halfback), Hardaway (right halfback), Carpenter (fullback). The substitutes were: Bean.

The starting lineup for Virginia was: Robert Taylor (left end), John Loyd (left tackle), Malcolm Griffin (left guard), Paul Norfleet (center), Charles Haskel (right guard), George Henderson (right tackle), H. T. Summersgill (right end), David Lyman (quarterback), Harry Gerstle (left halfback), Albert Mallory (right halfback), Robert Coleman (fullback). The substitutes were: Julian Byrd, Burnley Lankford, Charles McGill, Brodie Nalle and Stuart.

=== Roanoke ===
Roanoke vs. VPI

Team	1	2	Total
Roanoke	0	0	0
• VPI	27	18	45

- Date: November 18, 1899
- Location: Athletic Park
  Roanoke, VA
- Referee: Montgomery

The starting lineup for VPI was: Jewell (left end), McCormick (left tackle), Carper (left guard), Montgomery (center), Choice (right guard), Cox (right tackle), Lewis (right end), DeCamps (quarterback), Bell (left halfback), Hardaway (right halfback), Carpenter (fullback).

The starting lineup for Roanoke was: Heckel (left end), McClintie (left tackle), R. C. Patterson (left guard), Buck (center), J. W. Moss (right guard), Lemon (right tackle), C. Bear (right end), Spencer (quarterback), J. W. Hall (left halfback), Wilson (right halfback), J. A. Bear (fullback).

=== Washington and Lee ===
Washington & Lee vs. VPI

Team	1	2	Total
W&L	0	0	0
• VPI	28	7	35

- Date: November 30, 1899
- Location: Roanoke, VA
- Game start: 3:30 p.m.
- Game attendance: 2,500
- Referee: Morrow

The starting lineup for VPI was: Jewell (left end), McCormick (left tackle), Carper (left guard), Montgomery (center), Choice (right guard), Cox (right tackle), Lewis (right end), DeCamps (quarterback), Bell (left halfback), Hardaway (right halfback), Carpenter (fullback).

The starting lineup for Washington and Lee was: Thomas Bledsoe (left end), Charles McNeill (left tackle), Linwood Holmes (left guard), R. H. Allen (center), Charles Harrison (right guard), E. McD. Moore (right tackle), Samuel McPheeters (right end), Edwin Bledsoe (quarterback), Albert Jenkins (left halfback), G. S. Guion (right halfback), Edward Booker (fullback). The substitutes were: Ewing Sloan.

== Players ==
The following players were members of the 1899 football team according to the roster published in the 1903 edition of The Bugle, the Virginia Tech yearbook.

VPI 1899 roster
Quarterback: Kit DeCamps; Guards: Robert William Carper; William Choice; Tackles: W. F. Cox (Capt.); Hub McCormick; Center: R. W. Montgomery	Ends: Lindsay Louin Jewell; Harold Benjamin Lewis; Halfbacks: William Frazier Bell; Edward Wood Hardaway; John Brabson Huffard; Fullback: Hunter Carpenter	Substitutes: John Newton Ashton; Wyndham Randolph Bean; William Leonard Blair; Samuel Guy Bralley; McCulloch; William Stuart Moffett; Joseph Clyde Steele; Albert Y. Wootten

== Coaching and training staff ==
- Head coach: James Morrison
- Manager: George W. Hutchinson
