= 1899 Arkansas Cardinals football team =

American college football season

1899 Arkansas Cardinals football
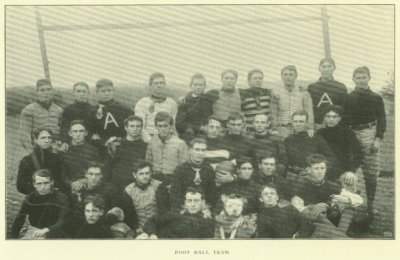
- Conference: Independent
- Record: 3–1–1
- Head coach: Colbert Searles (1st season)
- Captain: Chester Sloan
- Home stadium: The Hill

1899 Southern college football independents records
	Conf.			Overall
Team	W	L	T	W		L		T
VMI		–		1	–	0	–	0
VPI		–		4	–	1	–	0
Delaware		–		6	–	2	–	0
Arkansas		–		3	–	1	–	1
Georgetown		–		5	–	2	–	1
Texas A&M		–		4	–	2	–	0
Oklahoma		–		2	–	1	–	0
Baylor		–		2	–	1	–	1
Guilford		–		2	–	1	–	1
Navy		–		5	–	3	–	0
Virginia		–		4	–	3	–	2
Add-Ran		–		0	–	0	–	1
Richmond		–		2	–	2	–	0
South Carolina		–		2	–	3	–	0
West Virginia		–		2	–	3	–	0
William & Mary		–		2	–	3	–	0
North Carolina A&M		–		1	–	2	–	2
Davidson		–		1	–	3	–	1
Maryland		–		1	–	4	–	0
Marshall		–		0	–	0	–	1

The 1899 Arkansas Cardinals football team represented the University of Arkansas during the 1899 college football season. The Cardinals played four intercollegiate football games and one game against a high school team from Joplin, Missouri. They compiled a 3–1–1 record and outscored their opponents by a combined total of 37 to 21. The team's one loss came against Oklahoma by an 11–5 score.

Colbert Searles was the team's football coach in 1899 and 1900. He was a graduate of Wesleyan University and a professor of romance languages. In the summer of 1901, he left the University of Arkansas to accept a position as a professor at Stanford University.

The team's roster in 1899 included the following players: Oscar Briggs; Wm. A. Freeman; H. H. Ham; Charles D. Harrison; DeMatt Henderson; Wilburn D. Hobbs; Frank D. James; J. K. McCall; Percy B. Meyer; Chester C. Sloan; Carl C. Smith; James Vanderventer; and Ashton Vincenheller.

== Schedule ==
Date	Opponent	Site	Result	Source
October 7	Drury	The Hill; Fayetteville, AR	W 10–0	
October 27	at Kendall	Muskogee, Indian Territory	W 11–0	
October 28	at Oklahoma	Shawnee, OK	L 5–11	
November 3	at Kendall	Muskogee, Indian Territory	T 0–0	
November 18	Joplin High School	The Hill; Fayetteville, AR	W 11–10	
