= 1899 Maryland Aggies football team =

American college football season

1899 Maryland Aggies football
- Conference: Independent
- Record: 1–4
- Head coach: S. S. Cooke (1st season)
- Home stadium: Maryland Agricultural College Field

1899 Southern college football independents records
| | Conf. | | | Overall |
| Team | W | L | T | W | | L | | T |
|---|---|---|---|---|---|---|---|---|
| VMI | | – | | 1 | – | 0 | – | 0 |
| VPI | | – | | 4 | – | 1 | – | 0 |
| Delaware | | – | | 6 | – | 2 | – | 0 |
| Arkansas | | – | | 3 | – | 1 | – | 1 |
| Georgetown | | – | | 5 | – | 2 | – | 1 |
| Texas A&M | | – | | 4 | – | 2 | – | 0 |
| Oklahoma | | – | | 2 | – | 1 | – | 0 |
| Baylor | | – | | 2 | – | 1 | – | 1 |
| Guilford | | – | | 2 | – | 1 | – | 1 |
| Navy | | – | | 5 | – | 3 | – | 0 |
| Virginia | | – | | 4 | – | 3 | – | 2 |
| Add-Ran | | – | | 0 | – | 0 | – | 1 |
| Richmond | | – | | 2 | – | 2 | – | 0 |
| South Carolina | | – | | 2 | – | 3 | – | 0 |
| West Virginia | | – | | 2 | – | 3 | – | 0 |
| William & Mary | | – | | 2 | – | 3 | – | 0 |
| North Carolina A&M | | – | | 1 | – | 2 | – | 2 |
| Davidson | | – | | 1 | – | 3 | – | 1 |
| Maryland | | – | | 1 | – | 4 | – | 0 |
| Marshall | | – | | 0 | – | 0 | – | 1 |

The 1899 Maryland Aggies football team represented Maryland Agricultural College (later part of the University of Maryland) in the 1899 college football season. In their first and only season under head coach S. S. Cooke (sometimes referenced as S. M. Cooke), the Aggies compiled a 1–4 record and were outscored by their opponents, 157 to 26. The team was shut out in all four of its intercollegiate football games; its only victory was by a 26–0 score over Eastern High School from Washington, D. C.

== Schedule ==
| Date | Opponent | Site | Result | Source |
|---|---|---|---|---|
| October 14 | Western Maryland | College Field; College Park, MD | L 0–21 | |
| October 25 | Eastern High School | College Field; College Park, MD | W 26–0 | |
| October 28 | at Johns Hopkins | Union Park; Baltimore, MD | L 0–40 | |
| November 8 | at Delaware | Union Street Grounds; Wilmington, DE | L 0–34 | |
| November 11 | at St. John's (MD) | Annapolis, MD | L 0–62 | |
