= Maryland Intercollegiate Football Association =

College sports conference, 1894–1899

- Founded: 1894
- Folded: 1899

The Maryland Intercollegiate Football Association (MIFA), also called the Maryland Intercollegiate League, was an early college football conference with a membership composed of schools located primarily in the state of Maryland. One exception was Gallaudet, which is located in Washington, D.C. All of the members were universities, except Baltimore City College, a preparatory school located in Baltimore, Maryland.

The impetus for the formation of the MIFA was a controversial game on November 1, 1893 between the Maryland Agricultural College (now known as the University of Maryland, College Park) and Saint John's College of Annapolis. Maryland won the game, 6–0, but St. John's players later wrote in the Baltimore American that "a decision by which the M.A.C. were allowed to score the only touchdown made by the quarterback after a run of 90 yards, with no one in pursuit, appeared a very doubtful one." Maryland finished the season by beating Western Maryland and the Orient Athletic Club. With a 6–0 record, the "Aggies" were named the state champions, but the title was contested by St. John's. The following season, Maryland's former quarterback and coach William W. Skinner led the effort to create an intercollegiate football league to improve the process in which the state championship was awarded. The conference began competition on October 13, 1894 with games between St. John's College and Washington College in Annapolis, and Maryland Agricultural College and Western Maryland in Westminster.

The association voted to disband during the 1899 season under the threat of withdrawal by Johns Hopkins University after legislation was passed to prevent its use of graduate student-athletes. The league was subsequently reorganized without Hopkins. Maryland Agricultural College claimed the championship in 1906. After the 1907 season, the Aggies, St. John's and Washington reformed the association, without Western Maryland College, with the S.J.C. Cadets retaining their title of the three-team "league" in 1908.

== Membership ==
The following schools were members of the MIFA at some point. Where known, the years of membership are included:

- Baltimore City College, 189?-1897
- Gallaudet, 1897–?
- Johns Hopkins, 1894–1899
- Loyola
- Maryland Agricultural College (now University of Maryland, College Park), 1894–1897
- Mount St. Mary's
- St. John's College, 1894–?
- Washington College, 1894–1897
- Western Maryland (now McDaniel College), 1894–?

== Football champions ==
- 1894 – St. John's (MD)
- 1895 – St. John's (MD)
- 1896 – Unknown
- 1897 – Gallaudet Bison football
- 1898 – Gallaudet Bison football
- 1899 – Johns Hopkins
- 1900 – retained by JHU
- 1901 – JHU by SJC forfeit
- 1902 – St. John's (MD)
- 1903 – Unknown
- 1904 – Unknown
- 1905 – several claimed title
- 1906 – Maryland Agricultural College
- 1907 – St. John's (MD)
- 1908 – St. John's (MD)

== See also ==
- List of Maryland Intercollegiate Football Association standings
- List of defunct college football conferences
