= Davidson Wildcats football =

Intercollegiate American football team for Davidson College in North Carolina, US

2026 Davidson Wildcats football team
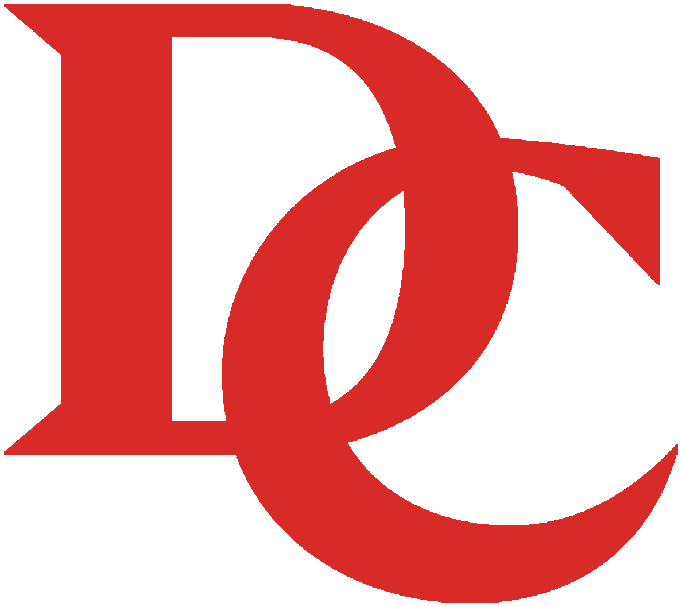
- First season: 1896; 130 years ago
- Athletic director: Chris Clunie
- Head coach: Saj Thakkar; 1st season, 2–10 (.167)
- Location: Davidson, North Carolina
- Stadium: Davidson College Stadium (capacity: 5,000)
- NCAA division: Division I FCS
- Conference: Pioneer Football League
- Colors: Red and black
- All-time record: 472–659–45 (.420)
- Bowl record: 0–1 (.000)

Conference championships
- SoCon: 1969 PFL: 2020, 2021
- Website: DavidsonWildcats.com

The Davidson Wildcats football program is the intercollegiate American football team for Davidson College located in the U.S. state of North Carolina. The team competes in the NCAA Division I Football Championship Subdivision (FCS) and are members of the Pioneer Football League. Davidson's first football team was fielded in 1896. The team plays its home games at the 5,000 seat Davidson College Stadium in Davidson, North Carolina. The Wildcats are coached by Saj Thakkar.

== History ==
Football at Davidson began during the late 1880s as a club football team. The rules for the game of football were still being standardized, so the teams met before every game to set the rules straight for that particular contest. The first uniforms for the club were dark sweaters or canvas jackets with "DC" chalked on the front.

In 1897, the school organized a schedule of games against other area club teams. The original colors were actually pink and blue. In September 1889, the students created a Rugby Football Association. Goal posts were set up, a field was chosen and marked, and the students got the association admitted to the North Carolina Football League.

At that time, American football was still more popular among the student body. Before any collegiate level football was even mentioned, the male students would participate in incredibly vicious inter-class football games. All four classes would play each other in these intense games, and injuries were common. During one game, future professor James M. Douglas (class of 1893) broke his arm. In that same game, future president Walter Lingle (class of 1892) was knocked unconscious. Eventually, these rivalries drive the student body to begin an intercollegiate football program (Gillespie 22).

Finally, in October 1898, the faculty allowed Davidson students to participate in intercollegiate football games. Their first intercollegiate game was played on November 5, 1898 against the University of North Carolina. The game was so big that a special train was chartered to take the entire school into Charlotte to cheer the team on. Luckily for the players, the school colors were changed by the student body in 1895 from pink and blue to red and black. The team lost 11–0, but the editorial in the Davidson College Magazine was entitled "Victory in Defeat" (Gillespie 22). Davidson football had officially begun.

The team became both successful and popular over the next twenty years. With a record of 20–12–1 in the program's first seven seasons, the school had no complaints. In 1906, the Davidson football team made history. Prior to a game against Georgia, the Davidson coaching staff took note of the new rule that made a forward pass a legal play. During the game, the team completed several short passes over the middle and ended up winning 15–0. Fuzzy Woodruff gives the team credit for being the first team in the South to complete a forward pass in his book, "The History of Southern Football."

In 1917, Davidson officially adopted a nickname. Formerly nicknamed "the preachers", Davidson became known as the Wildcats after some Georgians commented that the team—undersized, scrappy and tenacious—"fought like wildcats" against Georgia Tech. Another interesting thing occurred in 1929. In a 13–12 win over Duke, senior captain Thad Brock faked a punt seven yards deep in his own end zone. He ran and scrambled around the entire Duke defense to be awkwardly brought down five yards before Dukes end zone. The 102 yard run was featured in a Ripley's Believe It or Not on September 17, 1930. It was known as the longest and "nerviest" non-touchdown play ever (Charlotte Observer 7B).

In 1929, donations from Henry Smith Richardson (class of 1906) and Lunsford Richardson (1914), in memory of their father, Lunsford Richardson (1875), made possible construction of a new football stadium. In 1927, Professor F.L. Jackson wrote to the Board of Trustees about the field:

I do not know of any single gift that has come to the college that has touched more intimately the student life of the college, and that has been used, admired, and appreciated more by students and friends of the college, than this handsome field. (Gillespie 23)

Davidson football was growing, and the stadium was a huge contributor to this growth. The teams Davidson were playing in the 1930s, however, were much larger and were getting better and better. Davidson hadn't beaten Duke or North Carolina in ten years. President Walter L. Lingle spoke about this growth and the effects it could have on the school:

There are some vocal alumni who want us to go in for big-time football. Big time football may be all right for big Universities, but in the case of a small college it is unthinkable….We would find that it would change the atmosphere and the ideals of the college very quickly. (Gillespie 23)

The Board of Trustees responded to these issues by requiring all Davidson schedules to be adjusted according to the size and strength of the opponents.

Doc Newton was the head football Coach at Davidson for a number of years in the 1930s. During his tenure as Coach, Davidson had a 23-17 record (with 5 ties).

In 1936, the football team joined the Southern Conference to help meet the Boards' scheduling requests. Scholarships were denied authorization, but financial aid was allowed for athletes that met certain Davidson standards. Davidson was steering away from creating a state-school football atmosphere. Instead, the student-athlete tradition would continue.

In the midst of World War II, intercollegiate football had slowed dramatically in 1944. Those who had not gone to war were young and inexperienced, and the team scored a total of six points in five games during the 1943 season. These tough seasons created some major decisions for the school. The football team needed to find some other small schools that had the same type of athletics program. The only colleges that were of the same relative competitiveness and size as Davidson had given up subsidized sports. This caused the Board of Trustees to vote for Davidson to switch to unsubsidized athletics in 1954. The decision was never carried out, and the money spent on scholarships began to rise.

A school record five consecutive winning seasons was set from 1954–1958 with a total record of 26–17–1. Some of the best football ever played at Davidson occurred in the following decade. In 1969, the 'Cats went 7–4 to match a school record with victories. The same team was invited to play in the Tangerine Bowl where Coach Homer Smith was named SoCon coach of the year. By 1971, football scholarships alone cost the school more money than both football and basketball had ten years earlier. These scholarships were given without need. Finally, in 1973, the trustees voted to make football grants only to students with demonstrated need (Gillespie 23).

In 1980, the Davidson football team experienced its last winning season for a long time. From 1981–1989, the 'Cats went 14–78. Four games were won from 1985–1989, and the team went winless in '86 and '88. This led to a major decision on November 29, 1988. The trustees voted to move the football program into NCAA Division III, eliminating all football scholarships. Many players threatened to transfer, and some thought that the team would not have enough players and coaches to even have a season the following year. Davidson then moved into the NCAA Division I-AA Independent League on a non-scholarship basis.

Alumnus Dave Fagg '58 led the 'Cats to a 15–13 record from 1990–92. Tim Landis took over for the rest of the 1990s, posting two eight-win seasons in 1998 and 1999. In 2000, Joe Susan took over after Landis' departure and led the 'Cats to their first undefeated season with a perfect 10–0 record. Susan left immediately after his success and was replaced by Mike Toop, who led the team to an impressive 7–3 season in 2002, the team's second season in the Pioneer Football League. In 2003, Stephen B. Smith '66 selflessly gave the football program a grant of two million dollars.

Scott Abell took the head coaching reigns in 2018. In his first season, Abell led the Wildcats to their first winning season since 2007 with a 6–5 record after beating Butler in the last game of the season, by a stonewall defense goal-line stand with 4 stops inside the 2-yard line to end the game. Abell subsequently ended the 2019 season with an 8–4 record. In the spring of 2021 Scott Abell and the Wildcats took the PFL conference championship, in the COVID-19 adjusted spring schedule, the first PFL title in Davidson College history. A key victory in the spring 2021 season was 31–25 win at #25 San Diego. The victory snapped San Diego's NCAA record-tying 39 game conference winning streak. Davidson followed up their first PFL title with a repeat championship in the fall 2021 season. Key victories in the 2021 season included a 28–16 win over San Diego in the conference opener as well as a title-clinching 45–14 win over Drake in the regular-season finale.

Saj Thakkar was named Davidson College’s 29th head coach on December 17, 2024.

Davidson's current rivals in football are Stetson, another school that competes in the Pioneer Football League, and Presbyterian College, a PFL team from nearby South Carolina. Davidson and Presbyterian compete annually in the Carolina Border Clash with the winner taking home the 1919 Cup. 1919 refers to the year Davidson and Presbyterian first met on the gridiron. Davidson leads the all-time series with PC 18–14–2.

=== Classifications ===
- 1937–1953: NCAA University Division
- 1954–1966: NCAA College Division
- 1967–1972: NCAA University Division
- 1973–1976: NCAA Division I
- 1977: NCAA Division II
- 1978–1989: NCAA Division I-AA
- 1990–1992: NCAA Division III
- 1993–present: NCAA Division I–AA/FCS

=== Conference memberships ===
- 1896–1915: Independent
- 1916–1921: South Atlantic Intercollegiate Athletic Association
- 1922–1931: Independent
- 1932–1936: Big Five Conference
- 1936–1986: Southern Conference
- 1987–1988: Patriot League
- 1989: NCAA Division I-AA independent
- 1990–1992: NCAA Division III independent
- 1993–2000: NCAA Division I-AA independent
- 2001–present: Pioneer Football League

== Playoff appearances ==
=== NCAA Division I-AA/FCS ===
Davidson has made three appearances in the FCS playoffs. The Wildcats' combined record is 0–3.

Year	Round	Opponent	Result
2020	First Round	Jacksonville State	L 14–49
2021	First Round	Kennesaw State	L 21–48
2022	First Round	Richmond	L 0–41

== Conference championships ==
Davidson has won three conference championships, one outright.

Years	Conference	Overall Record	Conference Record
1969†	Southern Conference	7–4	5–1
2020	Pioneer Football League	4–3	4–1
2021†	Pioneer Football League	8–3	7–1

† denotes co-champions

== Notable former players ==
- Buck Flowers
- Alex Gibbs
- Pete Hughes
- George M. King
- Gene McEver
- Paul Nichols
- William L. Younger
- Zion Johnson

== Bowl game appearances ==
Season	Date	Bowl	W/L	Opponent	PF	PA	Coach	Notes
1969	December 26, 1969	Tangerine Bowl	L	Toledo	33	56	Homer Smith	notes
Total		1 bowl game	0–1		33	56		

== Future non-conference opponents ==
Announced schedules as of July 31, 2026.

2026	2027	2029	2030	2031	2032
Concord University	at Austin Peay	Furman	at Furman	VMI	at VMI
Elon		at VMI			
Dickinson					
VMI					
