= 1898 VPI football team =

American college football season

1898 VPI football
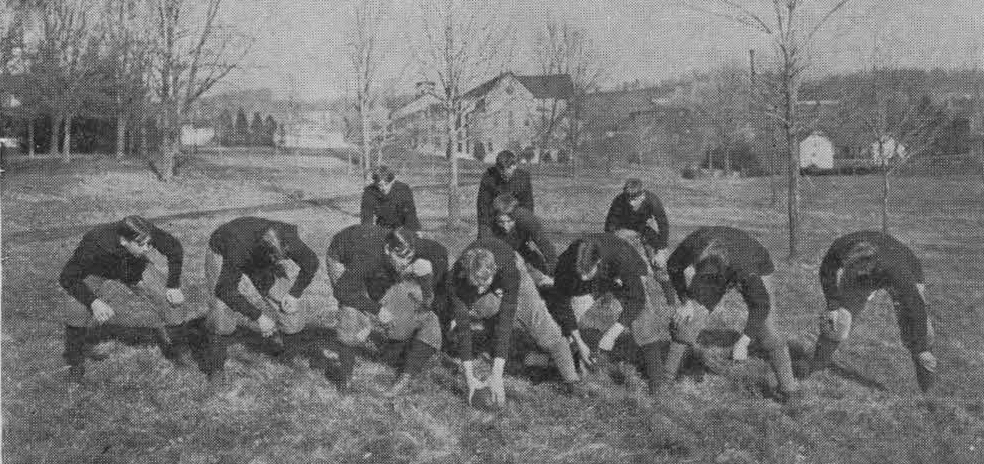
- Conference: Independent
- Record: 3–2
- Head coach: J. Lewis Ingles (1st season)
- Captain: Charles Wood
- Home stadium: Sheib Field

1898 Southern college football independents records
	Conf.			Overall
Team	W	L	T	W		L		T
North Carolina		–		9	–	0	–	0
Central (KY)		–		3	–	0	–	1
Oklahoma		–		2	–	0	–	0
Navy		–		7	–	1	–	0
West Virginia		–		6	–	1	–	0
Marshall		–		4	–	1	–	0
Georgetown		–		7	–	3	–	0
Texas A&M		–		4	–	2	–	0
VMI		–		4	–	2	–	0
Arkansas Industrial		–		2	–	1	–	0
Centre		–		2	–	1	–	2
VPI		–		3	–	2	–	0
Virginia		–		6	–	5	–	0
Richmond		–		3	–	3	–	1
Davidson		–		1	–	1	–	0
William & Mary		–		1	–	1	–	0
South Carolina		–		1	–	2	–	0
Delaware		–		2	–	5	–	2
Columbian		–		3	–	6	–	0
North Carolina A&M		–		1	–	2	–	0
Add-Ran		–		1	–	3	–	1
Maryland		–		2	–	6	–	1
Guilford		–		0	–	3	–	0

The 1898 VPI football team represented Virginia Agricultural and Mechanical College and Polytechnic Institute in the 1898 college football season. The team was led by their head coach J. Lewis Ingles and finished with a record of three wins and two losses (3–2).

== Schedule ==
Date	Time	Opponent	Site	Result	Source
November 4	11:00 a.m.	vs. North Carolina	South Side Park; Winston-Salem, NC	L 6–28	
November 5	2:30 p.m.	at Guilford*	Greensboro, NC	W 17–0	
November 7		vs. University of Maryland, Baltimore*	Rivermont Grounds; Lynchburg, VA	L 0–23	
November 11		King*	Sheib Field; Blacksburg, VA	W 58–0	
November 12		Bellevue School*	Sheib Field; Blacksburg, VA	W 34–0	
*Non-conference game

== Game summaries ==
=== North Carolina ===
North Carolina vs. VPI

Team	1	2	Total
• UNC	11	17	28
VPI	6	0	6

- Date: November 4, 1898
- Location: South Side Park
  Winston-Salem, NC
- Game start: 11:00 a.m.
- Referee: S. B. Alexander

The starting lineup for VPI was: Hubbard (left end), Thomas (left tackle), Carper (left guard), Stull (center), Cox (right guard), Wood (right tackle), Jewell (right end), Bell (quarterback), Rorebeck (left halfback), Ingles (right halfback), Painter (fullback).

The starting lineup for North Carolina was: Edwin Gregory (left end), S. E. Shull (left tackle), Cromartie (left guard), H. B. Cunningham (center), Isaac Phifer (right guard), Frank Bennett (right tackle), Herman Koehler (right end), Frank O. Rogers (quarterback), Jim MacRae (left halfback), Cartland (right halfback), Louis Graves (fullback). The substitutes were: E. V. Howell, Warren Kluttz and Miller.

=== Guilford ===
VPI at Guilford

Team	1	2	Total
• VPI	17	0	17
Guilford	0	0	0

- Date: November 5, 1898
- Location: Greensboro, NC
- Game start: 2:30 p.m.
- Referee: Cowan

The starting lineup for VPI was: Jewell (left end), Thomas (left tackle), Carper (left guard), Stull (center), Cox (right guard), Wood (right tackle), Hubbard (right end), Bell (quarterback), Ingles (left halfback), Hardaway (right halfback), Painter (fullback). The substitutes were: Huffard, McCrackin, McGavock and Roseback.

The starting lineup for Guilford was: Lewis (left end), Fox (left tackle), Foust (left guard), Bennett (center), Farlow (right guard), Wilson (right tackle), Hill (right end), Cowles (quarterback), Groome (left halfback), Moir (right halfback), Daniels (fullback).

=== Maryland, Baltimore ===
Maryland, Baltimore vs. VPI

Team	1	2	Total
• MB	17	6	23
VPI	0	0	0

- Date: November 7, 1898
- Location: Rivermont Grounds
  Lynchburg, VA
- Referee: Patrick

The starting lineup for VPI was: Jewell (left end), Cox (left tackle), Carper (left guard), Stull (center), Thomas (right guard), Wood (right tackle), Hubbard (right end), Bell (quarterback), Ingles (left halfback), Hardaway (right halfback), Painter (fullback). The substitutes were: Huffard, McCracken, McGavock and Rorebeck.

The starting lineup for Maryland, Baltimore was: Walker (left end), Nelson (left tackle), Dew (left guard), Gilbert (center), Cathell (right guard), Lewis (right tackle), Williams (right end), Green (quarterback), Lynch (left halfback), Frosher (right halfback), Whitaker (fullback). The substitutes were: Barrow, Emrick, Paget, Reese and Sellman.

== Players ==
The following players were members of the 1898 football team according to the roster published in the 1903 edition of The Bugle, the Virginia Tech yearbook.

VPI 1898 roster
Quarterback: William Frazier Bell; Guards: Robert William Carper; W. F. Cox; Tackles: Sidney Johnson Thomas; Charles Morton Wood (Capt.); Center: John Walter Stull	Ends: Archibald Blair Hubbard; Lindsay Louin Jewell; Halfbacks: Edward Wood Hardaway; John Brabson Huffard; J. Lewis Ingles; Curtis Grant Rorebeck; Fullback: Charles Whitfield Painter	Substitutes: Austin Aloysius McCracken; James Hamilton McGavock

== Coaching and training staff ==
- Head coach: J. Lewis Ingles
- Manager: George W. Hutchinson
- Medical adviser: W. F. Henderson, MD
