= 1898 College Football All-Southern Team =

American all-star college football team

The 1898 College Football All-Southern Team consists of American football players selected to the College Football All-Southern Teams selected by various organizations in 1898. North Carolina won the Southern championship.

== All-Southerns of 1898 ==
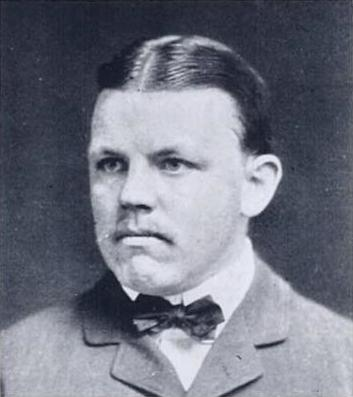
H. T. Summersgill.

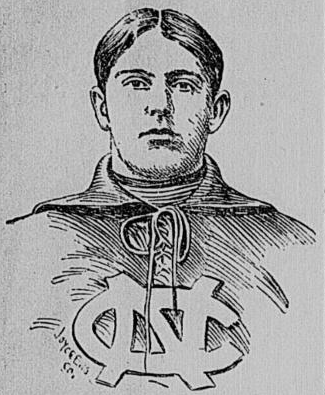
Frank Bennett.

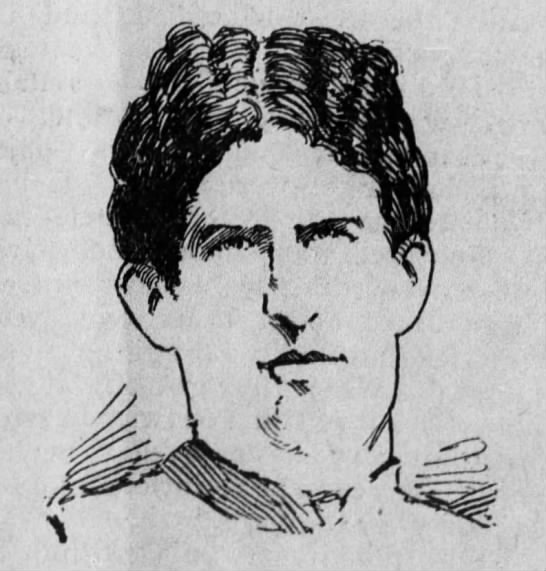
Frank O. Rogers.

Key

WAL = selected by W. A. Lambeth in Outing. The Vanderbilt Hustler reported his selection of Fitzgerald must have been a mistake, for he was only a sub and in 1896 and 1897, while in 1898 he was no longer on the team.

=== Ends ===
- H. T. Summersgill, Virginia (WAL)
- Herman Koehler, North Carolina (WAL)

=== Tackles ===
- John Loyd, Virginia (WAL)
- Frank Bennett, North Carolina (WAL)

=== Guards ===
- William S. Fitzgerald, Vanderbilt (WAL)
- James Davis, Virginia (WAL)

=== Centers ===
- John L. Templeman, Virginia (WAL)

=== Quarterbacks ===
- Frank O. Rogers, North Carolina (WAL)

=== Halfbacks ===
- Jim MacRae, North Carolina (WAL)
- Jack Dye, Vanderbilt (WAL)

=== Fullbacks ===
- Kit Jones, Georgia (WAL)

== See also ==
- South's Oldest Rivalry
