= 1898 Ursinus football team =

American college football season

1898 Ursinus football
- Conference: Independent
- Record: 7–2–1
- Head coach: Harry Off (2nd season)

1898 Eastern college football independents records
| | Conf. | | | Overall |
| Team | W | L | T | W | | L | | T |
|---|---|---|---|---|---|---|---|---|
| Harvard | | – | | 11 | – | 0 | – | 0 |
| Drexel | | – | | 7 | – | 0 | – | 0 |
| Princeton | | – | | 11 | – | 0 | – | 1 |
| Penn | | – | | 12 | – | 1 | – | 0 |
| Buffalo | | – | | 8 | – | 1 | – | 0 |
| Cornell | | – | | 10 | – | 2 | – | 0 |
| Swarthmore | | – | | 9 | – | 2 | – | 0 |
| Washington & Jefferson | | – | | 9 | – | 2 | – | 0 |
| Yale | | – | | 9 | – | 2 | – | 0 |
| Dickinson | | – | | 8 | – | 2 | – | 0 |
| Syracuse | | – | | 8 | – | 2 | – | 1 |
| Wesleyan | | – | | 7 | – | 3 | – | 0 |
| Western Penn. | | – | | 5 | – | 2 | – | 1 |
| Brown | | – | | 6 | – | 4 | – | 0 |
| Carlisle | | – | | 6 | – | 4 | – | 0 |
| Penn State | | – | | 6 | – | 4 | – | 0 |
| Pittsburgh College | | – | | 6 | – | 4 | – | 1 |
| Army | | – | | 3 | – | 2 | – | 1 |
| Vermont | | – | | 3 | – | 2 | – | 1 |
| Holy Cross | | – | | 5 | – | 4 | – | 1 |
| Bucknell | | – | | 4 | – | 4 | – | 3 |
| Fordham | | – | | 1 | – | 1 | – | 2 |
| Franklin & Marshall | | – | | 4 | – | 4 | – | 2 |
| New Hampshire | | – | | 4 | – | 4 | – | 0 |
| Amherst | | – | | 4 | – | 5 | – | 1 |
| Villanova | | – | | 2 | – | 4 | – | 1 |
| Lehigh | | – | | 3 | – | 6 | – | 1 |
| Boston College | | – | | 2 | – | 5 | – | 1 |
| Colgate | | – | | 2 | – | 5 | – | 1 |
| Temple | | – | | 2 | – | 5 | – | 0 |
| Lafayette | | – | | 3 | – | 8 | – | 0 |
| NYU | | – | | 1 | – | 3 | – | 0 |
| Rutgers | | – | | 1 | – | 6 | – | 1 |
| Tufts | | – | | 1 | – | 9 | – | 0 |
| Geneva | | – | | 0 | – | 6 | – | 1 |

The 1898 Ursinus football team was an American football team that represented Ursinus College during the 1898 college football season. The team compiled a 7–2–1 record and outscored opponents by a total of 214 to 46. Harry Off was the head coach.

== Schedule ==
| Date | Opponent | Site | Result | Source |
|---|---|---|---|---|
| October 1 | Norristown Y.M.C.A. | Collegeville, PA | W 50–0 | |
| October 4 | at Lebanon Valley | Lebanon, PA | W 6–0 | |
| October 8 | Norristown | Collegeville, PA | W 31–0 | |
| October 15 | Pennsylvania Institution for the Deaf | Collegeville, PA | W 40–6 | |
| October 19 | at Swarthmore | Whittier Field; Swarthmore, PA | L 0–29 | |
| October 22 | at Pennsylvania Railroad YMCA | Philadelphia, PA | L 0–1 (forfeit) | |
| October 26 | Lebanon Valley | Collegeville, PA | W 25–0 | |
| October 29 | Delaware | Collegeville, PA | W 46–0 | |
| November 5 | at Haverford | Haverford, PA | W 6–0 | |
| November 16 | vs. Franklin & Marshall | Norristown, PA | T 10–10 | |
