= Kenly =

Kenly may refer to:

== Places ==
- Kenly, North Carolina, town in Johnston and Wilson counties, North Carolina, United States

== People ==
- Frank Kenly, American football coach
- John Reese Kenly (1818–1891), American lawyer and Civil War general
- William L. Kenly, American World War I general
