= 1898 Virginia Orange and Blue football team =

American college football season

1898 Virginia Orange and Blue football
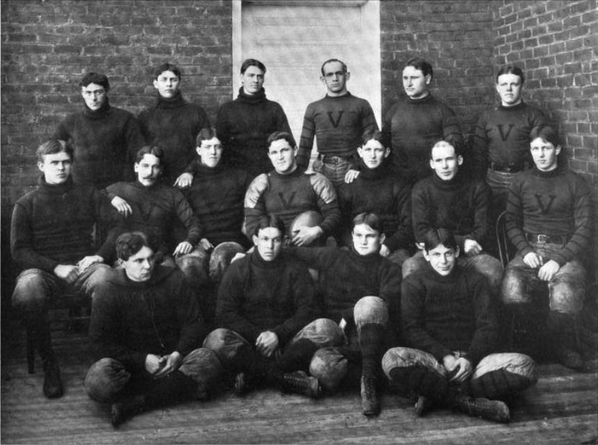
- Conference: Independent
- Record: 6–5
- Head coach: Joseph Massie (1st season)
- Captain: Harris T. Collier
- Home stadium: Madison Hall Field

1898 Southern college football independents records
	Conf.			Overall
Team	W	L	T	W		L		T
North Carolina		–		9	–	0	–	0
Central (KY)		–		3	–	0	–	1
Oklahoma		–		2	–	0	–	0
Navy		–		7	–	1	–	0
West Virginia		–		6	–	1	–	0
Marshall		–		4	–	1	–	0
Georgetown		–		7	–	3	–	0
Texas A&M		–		4	–	2	–	0
VMI		–		4	–	2	–	0
Arkansas Industrial		–		2	–	1	–	0
Centre		–		2	–	1	–	2
VPI		–		3	–	2	–	0
Virginia		–		6	–	5	–	0
Richmond		–		3	–	3	–	1
Davidson		–		1	–	1	–	0
William & Mary		–		1	–	1	–	0
South Carolina		–		1	–	2	–	0
Delaware		–		2	–	5	–	2
Columbian		–		3	–	6	–	0
North Carolina A&M		–		1	–	2	–	0
Add-Ran		–		1	–	3	–	1
Maryland		–		2	–	6	–	1
Guilford		–		0	–	3	–	0

The 1898 Virginia Orange and Blue football team represented the University of Virginia as an independent during the 1898 college football season. Led by first-year head coach Joseph Massie, the team compiled a record of 6–5. The Orange and Blue defeated Vanderbilt at Louisville in the South's most anticipated game. The team's captain was Harris T. Collier.

== Schedule ==
Date	Time	Opponent	Site	Result	Source
October 1		St. Albans	Madison Hall Field; Charlottesville, VA	W 16–0	
October 12		Penn	Franklin Field; Philadelphia, PA	L 0–40	
October 15		Gallaudet	Madison Hall Field; Charlottesville, VA	W 16–0	
October 29		Columbian	Madison Hall Field; Charlottesville, VA	W 47–0	
November 2		at Princeton	Princeton, NJ	L 0–12	
November 5		Maryland Medical College	Madison Hall Field; Charlottesville, VA	W 6–0	
November 8		at Georgetown	Georgetown Field; Washington, DC	W 12–0	
November 12		vs. Vanderbilt	Fontaine Ferry Park; Louisville, KY	W 18–0	
November 14		vs. West Virginia	Charleston, WV	L 0–6	
November 19		Navy	Madison Hall Field; Charlottesville, VA	L 0–6	
November 24	2:30 p.m.	vs. North Carolina	Traction Field; Richmond, VA (South's Oldest Rivalry)	L 2–6	

== Coaching staff ==
- Head coach: Joseph Massie
- Assistant coach: Arlie C. Jones
- Other assistants: Robert H. Mudd, Saunders Taylor, Porter Parker, Mike Johnson.
