= Shane Beamer =

American football coach & player (born 1977)

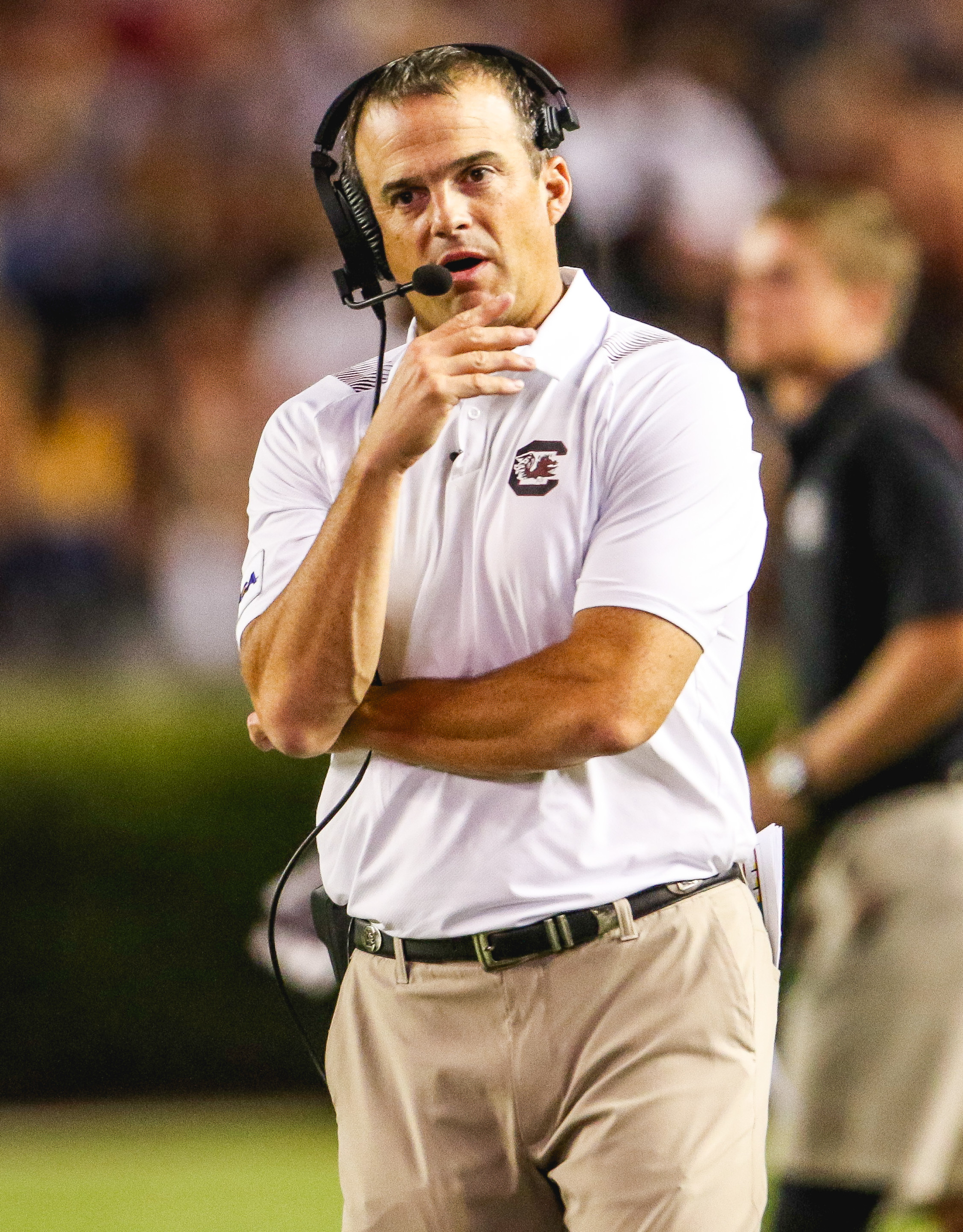
- Beamer with South Carolina in 2021

Current position
- Title: Head coach
- Team: South Carolina
- Conference: SEC
- Record: 39–35
- Annual salary: $8.15 million

Biographical details
- Born: March 31, 1977 (age 49); Charleston, South Carolina, U.S.

Playing career
- 1995–1999: Virginia Tech
- Positions: Wide receiver, long snapper

Coaching career (HC unless noted)
- 2000: Georgia Tech (GA)
- 2001–2003: Tennessee (GA)
- 2004–2005: Mississippi State (CB/RC)
- 2006: Mississippi State (RB/RC)
- 2007: South Carolina (OLB/co-ST)
- 2008: South Carolina (CB)
- 2009–2010: South Carolina (S/ST/RC)
- 2011–2015: Virginia Tech (AHC/RB)
- 2016–2017: Georgia (TE/ST)
- 2018–2020: Oklahoma (AHC/TE)
- 2021–present: South Carolina

Head coaching record
- Overall: 39–35
- Bowls: 1–2

Accomplishments and honors

Awards
- USA Today Sports Network SEC Coach of the Year (2024); Associated Press SEC Coach of the Year (2024); FWAA First-Year Coach of the Year (2021)

Shane Beamer (born March 31, 1977) is an American college football coach who is currently the head football coach at the University of South Carolina. Beamer has been credited with revitalizing South Carolina's football program. He has the second most top-ten wins in program history, and was named the SEC Coach of the Year in 2024. He previously served as an assistant coach at Georgia Tech, Tennessee, Mississippi State, South Carolina, Virginia Tech, Georgia, and Oklahoma.

He is the son of former Virginia Tech Hokies football head coach Frank Beamer.

== Early life ==
Beamer was born on March 31, 1977, in Charleston, South Carolina, to Cheryl (née Oakley) and Frank Beamer, at the time defensive line coach for the Citadel Bulldogs. In 1987, his father was named head coach of Virginia Tech, and the family moved to Blacksburg, Virginia. He attended Blacksburg High School where he lettered in both football and baseball, was first-team Group AA all-state receiver, and played in the 1995 Virginia high school all-star football game.

== College playing career ==
In 1995, Beamer chose to walk on as a wide receiver at Virginia Tech—where his father was head coach—over an offer of a partial scholarship from Division I-AA Charleston Southern. Later, he moved to long snapper, the position he played during the Hokies' 1999 season, in which they played for the national championship. That was his last game as a football player, having graduated in December 1999.

== Coaching career ==
=== Georgia Tech ===
Following Beamer's playing career, he became a graduate assistant at Georgia Tech under George O'Leary for one season (2000), helping with the quarterbacks and wide receivers. Beamer's team was scheduled to play against his father's team in the 2000 Black Coaches Association Classic to open the season, but the game was canceled because of lightning and Georgia Tech refused to reschedule it.

=== Tennessee ===
From 2001 to 2003, Beamer served as a graduate assistant under Phillip Fulmer at the University of Tennessee. He helped with the cornerbacks, assisted in all special teams areas, and oversaw game opponent scouting.

=== Mississippi State ===
In January 2004, for Beamer's first full-time coaching position, he was hired by Sylvester Croom at Mississippi State as cornerbacks coach and recruiting coordinator. In 2004 and 2005, three of his defensive backs earned All-SEC Freshmen honors. In the spring of 2006, Beamer remained the recruiting coordinator and became the Bulldogs' running backs coach. Beamer both recruited and coached running back Anthony Dixon, who would go on to play for the San Francisco 49ers and the Buffalo Bills.

=== South Carolina (assistant coach) ===
On February 14, 2007, Beamer was hired by Steve Spurrier at the University of South Carolina to coach outside linebackers and to serve as the special teams coordinator. In 2008, the Gamecock defense finished 2nd in pass defense and 13th in total defense nationally. His 2009 special teams unit blocked five kicks, tying for the SEC lead and ranking eighth in the nation, while the Gamecock defensive unit finished third in the SEC in total defense and fifteenth in the nation.

In 2009 and 2010, Beamer also served as the recruiting coordinator for the Gamecocks, "setting the foundation for the most successful run in school history". The 2009 class was ranked 12th best in the nation by Scout.com and Rivals.com and included future NFL Draft picks Stephon Gillmore and Alshon Jeffery. Both the 2010 and 2011 recruiting classes ranked in the top 25 and included future South Carolina stars and NFL players Marcus Lattimore and Connor Shaw.

=== Virginia Tech ===
On February 14, 2011, it was announced that Beamer would join his father in Blacksburg as the running backs coach. In his first year, he coached the school's single season rushing record holder, All-American and ACC Player of the Year, David Wilson. Wilson was subsequently drafted in the first round by the New York Giants.

The 2014 season was notable in Beamer's career for several reasons. Firstly, Beamer accepted Wake Forest game plan information prior to Virginia Tech's game against the Demon Deacons. The information was provided by Demon Deacons radio analyst Tommy Elrod, a former Wake Forest player and assistant coach who was at the center of what became the "WakeyLeaks" scandal. Virginia Tech eventually lost the game 6–3 in overtime after a 0–0 tie in regulation. The accusations came to light in 2016 when Beamer had moved on to an assistant coach position at the University of Georgia. Beamer denies providing the information to the coaching staff or players but was fined $25,000 by Georgia for his part in the scandal.

Beamer was also the acting head coach in the 2014 Military Bowl, as his father took a break from coaching to undergo throat surgery. The Hokies won by a score of 33–17.

On November 1, 2015, Frank Beamer announced he would be retiring at the end of the season.

=== Georgia ===
On January 5, 2016, days after his father's retirement, Beamer was hired by the University of Georgia to serve on Kirby Smart's staff as the tight ends coach and special teams coordinator. He coached several future NFL talents during his stint in Athens, including placekicker Rodrigo Blankenship and tight end Charlie Woerner. In 2016, Georgia ranked 112th in net punting average and 116th in kickoff return defense. By 2017, Georgia ranked 8th in net punting average and 40th in kickoff return defense, as well as 20th in kickoff return average, and Beamer appeared in his second national championship game.

=== Oklahoma ===
On January 22, 2018, weeks after Georgia defeated them in the Rose Bowl, the University of Oklahoma hired Beamer to be assistant head coach under Lincoln Riley. Specifically, he was an assistant head coach for the offense, coaching tight ends and H-backs, and also played a role in overseeing special teams. Beamer was a part of the staff that coached the nation-leading scoring offense in 2018, where they averaged 48.4 points per game. During the three seasons that Beamer was a part of the staff, the Sooners won three Big 12 Championships and appeared in two College Football Playoffs.

=== South Carolina (head coach) ===
South Carolina head coach Will Muschamp was fired on November 15, 2020. Shane Beamer, still an assistant at Oklahoma, was considered one of the top candidates to replace Muschamp, alongside active head coaches such as Hugh Freeze and Billy Napier. South Carolina athletic director Ray Tanner announced that the school had hired Shane Beamer as its 36th head coach on December 6, 2020.

==== 2021 season ====
Beamer led South Carolina to a 2021 recruiting class that was ranked No. 80 by 247Sports, and No. 74 by Rivals.com. Additionally, Beamer brought on nine new assistant coaches to his staff, with only outside linebackers coach Mike Peterson remaining from Muschamp's staff. Most notably, he hired Pete Lembo as assistant head coach and special teams coordinator, Marcus Satterfield as offensive coordinator and quarterbacks coach, and Clayton White as defensive coordinator and inside linebackers coach.

Due to the roster turnover from Muschamp and only winning six games over the previous two seasons, South Carolina was predicted to win four games in 2021.

On September 4, 2021, Beamer coached and won his first game at South Carolina, a home game at Williams–Brice Stadium against Eastern Illinois. Beamer's first road game came a week later, with a victory over East Carolina. His first conference game and first loss came another week later back at home, against the eventual national champion No. 2 Georgia. By the end of October, the Gamecocks were 4–4, meeting the preseason expected win total.

On November 6, 2021, after a Halloween bye week, South Carolina welcomed Florida to Williams–Brice. Going into the game, the Gamecocks were 20.5-point underdogs and given a 15.3% chance to win by ESPN. Despite this, the Gamecocks upset the Gators in dominating fashion, winning the game with a final score of 40–17. The Gamecocks were now 5–4, exceeding the preseason expected win total, and only one win away from bowling. The win was described as the "first true taste" of the big wins that Beamer had experienced during the last time he was at South Carolina, as an assistant. Beamer said after the game: “I remember days and nights like this. We're not there yet. We're still a work in progress, but we took a big step tonight.”

South Carolina won only one of its next three games, a comeback underdog victory at home against Auburn, finishing the regular season 6–6 and achieving bowl eligibility. Following the regular season, it was announced that South Carolina would face North Carolina in the Duke's Mayo Bowl, and that former Oklahoma quarterback Spencer Rattler would be transferring to South Carolina. Rattler and Beamer had a connection from their time together at Oklahoma.

Beamer wrapped up his first season with a 38–21 victory in the Duke's Mayo Bowl, finishing 7–6. Following the win, 4.5 gallons of mayonnaise were voluntarily poured onto Beamer. The video of this happening went viral and resulted in a lot of publicity and positive buzz for South Carolina's football program.

The university has called the 2021 season "successful", with Beamer tying the school record for wins by a first-year head coach, doubling the preseason's expected win total and surpassing the win total of the two previous seasons combined. Beamer was named the winner of the Steve Spurrier National First-Year Coach Award, alongside Josh Heupel from Tennessee.

==== 2022 season ====
Beamer led South Carolina to a 2022 recruiting class that was ranked No. 24 by 247Sports, and No. 26 by Rivals.com, as well as a transfer portal class that was ranked No. 9 by 247Sports. The most notable transfer was Spencer Rattler, who would be Beamer's starting quarterback for the next two seasons.

The Gamecocks started the season 1–2, but would win seven of their last ten games, continuing a school trend of head coaches having memorable second seasons.

On October 8, 2022, South Carolina upset No. 13 Kentucky on the road. It was Beamer's first ever SEC road win and also his first ever win over a ranked opponent. The win was described as "monumental" and Beamer was named the Dodd Trophy Coach of the Week. Two weeks later, South Carolina defeated Texas A&M for the first time in program history. By this point, South Carolina was on its first four-game winning streak since 2013, and subsequently entered the rankings for the first time since 2018. However, they would lose two of the next three games, falling out of the rankings once again.

On November 19, 2022, South Carolina beat No. 5 Tennessee at home by a score of 63–38. South Carolina's 63 points were the most points scored by an unranked team over a top-five opponent in college football history. Additionally, Beamer became the first FBS coach since the FBS/FCS split to win twice by 20+ points as a 20+ point underdog, with the first occasion being against Florida in 2021. Beamer was named the Dodd Trophy Coach of the Week for the second time that season. The following week, the Gamecocks upset their archrival No. 8 Clemson – a feat Muschamp had failed to achieve during his tenure – in Death Valley, ending the Tigers' 40-game home winning streak and 7-game winning streak in the rivalry. Beamer became the only coach in South Carolina history to win back-to-back games against top-10 teams. These consecutive wins have been described as "two of the biggest upsets in program history". It was only the seventh time in history that a school had defeated AP top-10 opponents in consecutive weeks as an unranked team, and the first since 2003.

The late-season wins garnered South Carolina its highest CFP ranking in program history, its highest AP ranking since 2014, and a berth in the Gator Bowl. Prior to the bowl game, Beamer's offensive coordinator since his inaugural season, Marcus Satterfield, left to become an assistant at Nebraska. Despite a lack of success in the NFL as an offensive coordinator, Beamer hired Dowell Loggains from Arkansas to replace Satterfield.

In the Gator Bowl, South Carolina lost to Notre Dame 45–38. The 2022 team finished the season with an 8–5 record and a No. 23 ranking in both major polls. It was the program's first 8-win season since 2017 and first final ranking since 2013. Beamer became only the fifth South Carolina head coach ever to have a team ranked in a final AP poll.

Days after the end of the season, Beamer's annual salary was increased from $2.75 million to $6.125 million, making him the highest-paid head coach in program history.

==== 2023 season ====
Beamer led South Carolina to a 2023 recruiting class that was ranked No. 16 by 247Sports, and No. 17 by Rivals.com. It was South Carolina's highest-ranked recruiting class since 2012. Beamer also led South Carolina to a transfer portal class that was ranked No. 27 by 247Sports, and No. 49 by Rivals.com.

Beamer entered the 2023 season facing what many called the most difficult schedule in the country. The Gamecocks lost their season-opener against No. 21 North Carolina, marking the first time Beamer started a season with a loss.

For the third game of the season, South Carolina went on the road to face two-time defending national champions No. 1 Georgia. South Carolina unexpectedly started the game 14–3, and Georgia's 11-point deficit at halftime was its biggest halftime deficit in nearly three years. Early in the third quarter, ESPN gave South Carolina a 61.9% chance to win, but the Gamecocks could not hold onto the lead. Georgia completed a comeback and won with a final score of 24–14.

After picking up its first conference win of the season at home against Mississippi State, South Carolina then lost the next four straight games, placing them at 2–6 for the season and only one loss away from bowl elimination. By the end of this losing streak, the largest in Beamer's career, the team was noted for its injuries, particularly on the offensive line. The most frustrating loss in this stretch was against Florida, blowing a 10-point fourth quarter lead at home, after which Beamer received media attention for breaking his foot.

However, with only home games remaining and some defensive adjustments, the Gamecocks started to turn their season around. They won their next three games, clawing their way back up to 5–6. South Carolina entered the regular season finale against No. 24 Clemson as 7.5-point underdogs at home, with one more chance for bowl eligibility. However, they lost with a final score of 7–16. Despite finishing the regular season 5–7, South Carolina still had a "longshot chance" to be selected for a bowl game, but this did not occur.

South Carolina finished the 2023 season with a record of 5–7, missing a bowl game for the first time in Beamer's tenure.

==== 2024 season ====
Beamer led South Carolina to a 2024 recruiting class that was ranked No. 22 by 247Sports, and No. 31 by Rivals.com, as well as a transfer portal class that was ranked No. 16 by 247Sports, and No. 11 by Rivals.com. The signing class included two 5-stars for the first time in program history. Following the losing season, there was much change on Beamer's staff. He fired an assistant for the first time: running backs coach Montario Hardesty. His associate head coach and special teams coordinator since his inaugural season, Pete Lembo, left to become the head coach at Buffalo. To replace Lembo, Beamer hired Joe DeCamillis from Texas.

The Gamecocks started the 2024 season by defeating Old Dominion and Kentucky, before facing their first ranked opponent in No. 16 LSU. The Gamecocks lost to the Tigers 36–33, with many, including industry professionals citing questionable officiating as the reason for the loss.

Following a win over Akron and losses to ranked opponents in Ole Miss and Alabama, the Gamecocks were 3–3 and were predicted to lose their upcoming road game against Oklahoma. The Gamecocks surprised many by winning a decisive 35–9 victory over the Sooners. The win over the Sooners was the first of a six-game winning streak, the longest in program history since 2013. This included three straight wins over ranked opponents, making Beamer the first head coach in program history to accomplish that feat. Highlight victories included a 44–20 rout of former Western division rival, No. 10 Texas A&M, a tight game against No. 23 Missouri, which Carolina won with a Sellers shovel pass to Rocket Sanders for a touchdown with less than 20 seconds remaining, and Beamer's second road victory against in-state rival, No. 12 Clemson. Subsequently, South Carolina lost to Illinois in the Citrus Bowl. For his outstanding efforts during the 2024 season, Shane Beamer won the SEC Coach of the Year award, becoming the third South Carolina Gamecocks coach to win the honor after Lou Holtz and Steve Spurrier.

== Recognition ==
Beamer ranked number 12 on the Post and Courier Columbia's 2025 Power List.

== Coaching assessment ==
Beamer's signature coaching style places an emphasis on special teams play and aggression in all three phases of the game, a style of play dubbed "Beamer Ball". This term was originally coined to describe the style of play during Frank Beamer's tenure at Virginia Tech, leading to his son's variant sometimes being called "Beamer Ball 2.0". It has been considered a major part of South Carolina's approach. From 2021 to September 2024, South Carolina blocked eleven punts, the most in the FBS during that time.

During his tenure, the Gamecocks also initially became known for "finishing out their seasons strong". Through Beamer's first four seasons, South Carolina was 10–8 in August/September, 5–8 in October, and 13–4 in November. As of November 15th, 2026, this record had changed to 15–12 in August/September, 8–11 in October, and 15–8 in November (alongside a 1-2 record in December). Beamer's record against Power Conference opponents was 23–34 over that five-and-a-half year period.

Beamer's first four seasons as head coach were each characterized by uneven results followed by late-season resurgences. Most of South Carolina's biggest upsets during that time (Florida in 2021, Tennessee and Clemson in 2022) also occurred in November. Beamer is known for repeating variations of the mantra "November to remember" to his players and to the media.

Beamer is also one of the most social media-active coaches in all of college football, a trait which has been considered beneficial for recruiting.

Shane Beamer has created a more positive, family-oriented culture at South Carolina, fostering a sense of connection and openness among players and coaches. He has emphasized core values like love, brotherhood, and belief, encouraging players to embrace their individuality and not be afraid to make mistakes.

== Personal life ==
Beamer graduated from Virginia Tech in December 1999 and earned a master's degree in sport management from the University of Tennessee in December 2003.

He and his wife Emily have three children.

Beamer has described himself as a friend of rival coach Dabo Swinney, with whom he talks occasionally throughout the season.

== Head coaching record ==
| Year | Team | Overall | Conference | Standing | Bowl/playoffs | Coaches^{#} | AP^{°} |
|---|---|---|---|---|---|---|---|
South Carolina Gamecocks (Southeastern Conference) (2021–present)
| 2021 | South Carolina | 7–6 | 3–5 | T–4th (Eastern) | W Duke's Mayo | | |
| 2022 | South Carolina | 8–5 | 4–4 | 3rd (Eastern) | L Gator | 23 | 23 |
| 2023 | South Carolina | 5–7 | 3–5 | T–4th (Eastern) | | | |
| 2024 | South Carolina | 9–4 | 5–3 | T–4th | L Citrus | 19 | 19 |
| 2025 | South Carolina | 4–8 | 1–7 | T–13th | | | |
| 2026 | South Carolina | 6–5 | 4–5 | | | | |
| South Carolina: | | 39–35 | 20–29 | | | | |
| Total: | | 39–35 | | | | | |
^{#}Rankings from final Coaches Poll.; ^{°}Rankings from final AP Poll.
