= 1898 Maryland Aggies football team =

American college football season

1898 Maryland Aggies football
- Conference: Independent
- Record: 2–6–1
- Head coach: Frank Kenly (1st season)
- Captain: Frank Kenly

1898 Southern college football independents records
	Conf.			Overall
Team	W	L	T	W		L		T
North Carolina		–		9	–	0	–	0
Central (KY)		–		3	–	0	–	1
Oklahoma		–		2	–	0	–	0
Navy		–		7	–	1	–	0
West Virginia		–		6	–	1	–	0
Marshall		–		4	–	1	–	0
Georgetown		–		7	–	3	–	0
Texas A&M		–		4	–	2	–	0
VMI		–		4	–	2	–	0
Arkansas Industrial		–		2	–	1	–	0
Centre		–		2	–	1	–	2
VPI		–		3	–	2	–	0
Virginia		–		6	–	5	–	0
Richmond		–		3	–	3	–	1
Davidson		–		1	–	1	–	0
William & Mary		–		1	–	1	–	0
South Carolina		–		1	–	2	–	0
Delaware		–		2	–	5	–	2
Columbian		–		3	–	6	–	0
North Carolina A&M		–		1	–	2	–	0
Add-Ran		–		1	–	3	–	1
Maryland		–		2	–	6	–	1
Guilford		–		0	–	3	–	0

The 1898 Maryland Aggies football team represented the Maryland Agricultural College (now the University of Maryland) in the 1898 college football season. The team was led by player-coach Frank Kenly and finished with a 2–6–1 record.

== Schedule ==
Date	Opponent	Site	Result	Source
October 13	Columbian	College Park, MD	L 5–17	
October 15	at Western Maryland	Westminster, MD	L 0–32	
October 18	Eastern High School	College Park, MD	W 36–0	
October 22	Gallaudet	College Park, MD	L 0–33	
October 26	at Rock Hill College	Ellicott City, MD	T 12–12	
October 29	at Johns Hopkins	Baltimore, MD	L 0–16	
November 2	at Episcopal High School	Alexandria, VA	L 0–37	
November 5	at Rock Hill College	Ellicott City, MD	W 27–0	
November 12	St. John's (MD)		L 0–6	

== Personnel ==
The players of the 1898 team were:

- Grant Church, end
- Hiram Collins, end
- English Eyster, end
- Frank Hines, end
- F. H. Peters, end
- Jim Bradley, tackle
- Ellis Caldwell, tackle
- Dorsey Cashell, tackle
- Harry Kefauver, tackle
- Fred Shamberger, tackle
- Jim Blandford, guard
- Turford Noble, guard
- Tom Symons, guard
- Jim Shipley, center
- Andy Grayson, quarterback
- Frank Kenly, quarterback
- Ellis Caldwell, halfback
- Joe Devon, halfback
- Tom Massey, halfback
- Jim Wilson, halfback
- Samuel Cooke, fullback and captain-coach

Manager:

- Robert McCandish
