= 1898 West Virginia Mountaineers football team =

American college football season

1898 West Virginia Mountaineers football
- Conference: Independent
- Record: 6–1
- Head coach: Harry Anderson (1st season)
- Captain: Lewis Yeager

1898 Southern college football independents records
	Conf.			Overall
Team	W	L	T	W		L		T
North Carolina		–		9	–	0	–	0
Central (KY)		–		3	–	0	–	1
Oklahoma		–		2	–	0	–	0
Navy		–		7	–	1	–	0
West Virginia		–		6	–	1	–	0
Marshall		–		4	–	1	–	0
Georgetown		–		7	–	3	–	0
Texas A&M		–		4	–	2	–	0
VMI		–		4	–	2	–	0
Arkansas Industrial		–		2	–	1	–	0
Centre		–		2	–	1	–	2
VPI		–		3	–	2	–	0
Virginia		–		6	–	5	–	0
Richmond		–		3	–	3	–	1
Davidson		–		1	–	1	–	0
William & Mary		–		1	–	1	–	0
South Carolina		–		1	–	2	–	0
Delaware		–		2	–	5	–	2
Columbian		–		3	–	6	–	0
North Carolina A&M		–		1	–	2	–	0
Add-Ran		–		1	–	3	–	1
Maryland		–		2	–	6	–	1
Guilford		–		0	–	3	–	0

The 1898 West Virginia Mountaineers football team represented West Virginia University as an independent during the 1898 college football season. In their first and only season under head coach Harry Anderson, the Mountaineers compiled a 6–1 record and outscored opponents by a combined total of 64 to 23. The team's only loss was to the Pittsburgh Athletic Club by an 18–0 score. Lewis Yeager was the team captain.

== Schedule ==
Date	Opponent	Site	Result	Source
October 7	Westminster (PA)	Morgantown, WV	W 24–0	
October 15	at Marietta	Marietta, OH	W 6–5	
October 27	at Pittsburgh Athletic Club	PAC Park; Pittsburgh, PA	L 0–18	
October 29	vs. Marietta	Clarksburg, WV	W 6–0	
November 4	vs. Western University of Pennsylvania	Fairmont, WV (rivalry)	W 6–0	
November 14	vs. Virginia	Charleston, WV	W 6–0	
November 16	vs. Ohio	Parkersburg, WV	W 16–0	
