= 1898 South Carolina Gamecocks football team =

American college football season

1898 South Carolina Gamecocks football
- Conference: Independent
- Record: 1–2
- Head coach: Bill Wertenbaker (1st season)
- Captain: J. C. Foster

1898 Southern college football independents records
	Conf.			Overall
Team	W	L	T	W		L		T
North Carolina		–		9	–	0	–	0
Central (KY)		–		3	–	0	–	1
Oklahoma		–		2	–	0	–	0
Navy		–		7	–	1	–	0
West Virginia		–		6	–	1	–	0
Marshall		–		4	–	1	–	0
Georgetown		–		7	–	3	–	0
Texas A&M		–		4	–	2	–	0
VMI		–		4	–	2	–	0
Arkansas Industrial		–		2	–	1	–	0
Centre		–		2	–	1	–	2
VPI		–		3	–	2	–	0
Virginia		–		6	–	5	–	0
Richmond		–		3	–	3	–	1
Davidson		–		1	–	1	–	0
William & Mary		–		1	–	1	–	0
South Carolina		–		1	–	2	–	0
Delaware		–		2	–	5	–	2
Columbian		–		3	–	6	–	0
North Carolina A&M		–		1	–	2	–	0
Add-Ran		–		1	–	3	–	1
Maryland		–		2	–	6	–	1
Guilford		–		0	–	3	–	0

The 1898 South Carolina Jaguars football team represented South Carolina College—now known as the University of South Carolina–as an independent during the 1898 college football season. Led by Bill Wertenbaker in his first and only season as head coach, South Carolina compiled a record of 1–2.

== Schedule ==
Date	Opponent	Site	Result	Source
October 18	Bingham	Columbia, SC	W 16–5	
November 17	Clemson	Columbia, SC (Big Thursday)	L 0–24	
November 24	vs. Davidson	Latta Park Baseball Field; Charlotte, NC	L 0–5	
