= 1898 Delaware football team =

American college football season

1898 Delaware football
- Conference: Independent
- Record: 2–5–2
- Head coach: Herbert Rice (2nd season)

1898 Southern college football independents records
	Conf.			Overall
Team	W	L	T	W		L		T
North Carolina		–		9	–	0	–	0
Central (KY)		–		3	–	0	–	1
Oklahoma		–		2	–	0	–	0
Navy		–		7	–	1	–	0
West Virginia		–		6	–	1	–	0
Marshall		–		4	–	1	–	0
Georgetown		–		7	–	3	–	0
Texas A&M		–		4	–	2	–	0
VMI		–		4	–	2	–	0
Arkansas Industrial		–		2	–	1	–	0
Centre		–		2	–	1	–	2
VPI		–		3	–	2	–	0
Virginia		–		6	–	5	–	0
Richmond		–		3	–	3	–	1
Davidson		–		1	–	1	–	0
William & Mary		–		1	–	1	–	0
South Carolina		–		1	–	2	–	0
Delaware		–		2	–	5	–	2
Columbian		–		3	–	6	–	0
North Carolina A&M		–		1	–	2	–	0
Add-Ran		–		1	–	3	–	1
Maryland		–		2	–	6	–	1
Guilford		–		0	–	3	–	0

The 1898 Delaware football team represented Delaware College—now known as the University of Delaware–as an independent during the 1898 college football season. Led by second-year head coach Herbert Rice, the team posted a 2–5–2 record.

== Schedule ==
Date	Opponent	Site	Result
October 1	at Swarthmore	Swarthmore, PA	L 0–22
October 8	Wilmington Conference Academy		W 29–0
October 14	St. John's (MD)		T 0–0
October 15	at Pennsylvania Military	Chester, PA	L 0–6
October 22	Wilmington Conference Academy		W 46–0
October 29	Ursinus	Collegeville, PA	L 0–46
November 5	at Swarthmore	Swarthmore, PA	T 0–0
November 12	at Haverford	Haverford, PA	L 0–18
November 24	at Pennsylvania Military	Chester, PA	L 5–11
