= 1898 Texas A&M Aggies football team =

American college football season

1898 Texas A&M Aggies football
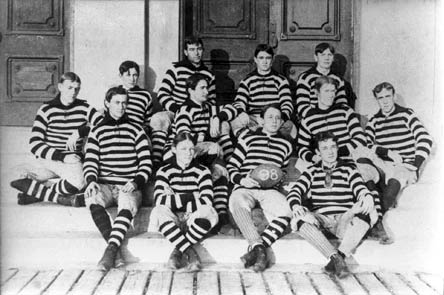
- Conference: Independent
- Record: 4–2
- Head coach: H. W. Williams (1st season)

1898 Southern college football independents records
	Conf.			Overall
Team	W	L	T	W		L		T
North Carolina		–		9	–	0	–	0
Central (KY)		–		3	–	0	–	1
Oklahoma		–		2	–	0	–	0
Navy		–		7	–	1	–	0
West Virginia		–		6	–	1	–	0
Marshall		–		4	–	1	–	0
Georgetown		–		7	–	3	–	0
Texas A&M		–		4	–	2	–	0
VMI		–		4	–	2	–	0
Arkansas Industrial		–		2	–	1	–	0
Centre		–		2	–	1	–	2
VPI		–		3	–	2	–	0
Virginia		–		6	–	5	–	0
Richmond		–		3	–	3	–	1
Davidson		–		1	–	1	–	0
William & Mary		–		1	–	1	–	0
South Carolina		–		1	–	2	–	0
Delaware		–		2	–	5	–	2
Columbian		–		3	–	6	–	0
North Carolina A&M		–		1	–	2	–	0
Add-Ran		–		1	–	3	–	1
Maryland		–		2	–	6	–	1
Guilford		–		0	–	3	–	0

The 1898 A&M Aggies football team represented the Agricultural and Mechanical College of Texas—now known as Texas A&M University—as an independent during the 1898 college football season. Led by H. W. Williams in his first and only season as head coach, the Aggies compiled a record of 4–2.

== Schedule ==
Date	Time	Opponent	Site	Result	Source
October 22		at Texas	Varsity Athletic Field; Austin, TX (rivalry)	L 0–48	
October 29	4:00 p.m.	Houston High School	College Station, TX	W 51–0	
November 12		Austin	College Station, TX	W 22–6	
November 19		Houston High School	College Station, TX	L 0–6	
November 24	3:30 p.m.	at Add-Ran Christian	Padgitt's Park; Waco, TX (rivalry)	W 16–0	
December 3		Fort Worth	College Station, TX	W 28–0	
