= 1898 Marshall Thundering Herd football team =

American college football season

1898 Marshall Thundering Herd football
- Conference: Independent
- Record: 4–1
- Head coach: None
- Home stadium: Central Field

1898 Southern college football independents records
	Conf.			Overall
Team	W	L	T	W		L		T
North Carolina		–		9	–	0	–	0
Central (KY)		–		3	–	0	–	1
Oklahoma		–		2	–	0	–	0
Navy		–		7	–	1	–	0
West Virginia		–		6	–	1	–	0
Marshall		–		4	–	1	–	0
Georgetown		–		7	–	3	–	0
Texas A&M		–		4	–	2	–	0
VMI		–		4	–	2	–	0
Arkansas Industrial		–		2	–	1	–	0
Centre		–		2	–	1	–	2
VPI		–		3	–	2	–	0
Virginia		–		6	–	5	–	0
Richmond		–		3	–	3	–	1
Davidson		–		1	–	1	–	0
William & Mary		–		1	–	1	–	0
South Carolina		–		1	–	2	–	0
Delaware		–		2	–	5	–	2
Columbian		–		3	–	6	–	0
North Carolina A&M		–		1	–	2	–	0
Add-Ran		–		1	–	3	–	1
Maryland		–		2	–	6	–	1
Guilford		–		0	–	3	–	0

The 1898 Marshall Thundering Herd football team represented Marshall University in the 1898 college football season. The team did not have a coach, and outscored their opponents 40–11 in four games (with one forfeit win) en route to the school's first winning season.

The 1898 season contained two major firsts in Marshall football history: the first win (on Oct. 22 against Kingsbury High School) and the first away game (on Nov. 9 in Catlettsburg, Kentucky).

== Schedule ==
Date	Opponent	Site	Result	Attendance
October 22	Kingsbury High School	Central Field; Huntington, WV	W 12–0	
November 5	Kingsbury High School	Central Field; Huntington, WV	W (forfeit)	
November 9	at Catlettsburg	Catlettsburg, KY	L 5–12	
November 18	Catlettsburg	Central Field; Huntington, WV	W 17–0	
November 25	Ashland High School^{†}	Central Field; Huntington, WV	W 6–0	500+
^{†}Homecoming
