= 1898 Richmond Spiders football team =

American college football season

1898 Richmond Spiders football
- Conference: Independent
- Record: 3–3–1
- Head coach: Oscar Lee Owens (1st season)
- Captain: Burnley Lankford
- Home stadium: Broad Street Park

1898 Southern college football independents records
	Conf.			Overall
Team	W	L	T	W		L		T
North Carolina		–		9	–	0	–	0
Central (KY)		–		3	–	0	–	1
Oklahoma		–		2	–	0	–	0
Navy		–		7	–	1	–	0
West Virginia		–		6	–	1	–	0
Marshall		–		4	–	1	–	0
Georgetown		–		7	–	3	–	0
Texas A&M		–		4	–	2	–	0
VMI		–		4	–	2	–	0
Arkansas Industrial		–		2	–	1	–	0
Centre		–		2	–	1	–	2
VPI		–		3	–	2	–	0
Virginia		–		6	–	5	–	0
Richmond		–		3	–	3	–	1
Davidson		–		1	–	1	–	0
William & Mary		–		1	–	1	–	0
South Carolina		–		1	–	2	–	0
Delaware		–		2	–	5	–	2
Columbian		–		3	–	6	–	0
North Carolina A&M		–		1	–	2	–	0
Add-Ran		–		1	–	3	–	1
Maryland		–		2	–	6	–	1
Guilford		–		0	–	3	–	0

The 1898 Richmond Spiders football team was an American football team that represented Richmond College—now known as the University of Richmond—as an independent during the 1898 college football season. Led by Oscar Lee Owens in his first and only year as head coach, Richmond compiled a record of 3–3–1.

== Schedule ==
Date	Time	Opponent	Site	Result	Attendance	Source
October ?		at Randolph–Macon	Ashland, VA	W 15–0		
October 25	4:00 p.m.	Hampden–Sydney	Broad Street Park; Richmond, VA	T 6–6		
October 29		at VMI	Lexington, VA (rivalry)	L 0–16		
October 31		at Washington and Lee	Lexington, VA	L 0–6		
November 14		Washington and Lee	Broad Street Park; Richmond, VA	W 10–0		
November 19		William & Mary	Broad Street Park; Richmond, VA (rivalry)	W 15–0		
November 24	3:30 p.m.	at Newport News A.C.	River View Park; Newport News, VA	L 0–11	250	
