= List of Virginia Tech Hokies head football coaches =

List of Football Coaches for the Virginia Tech Hokies

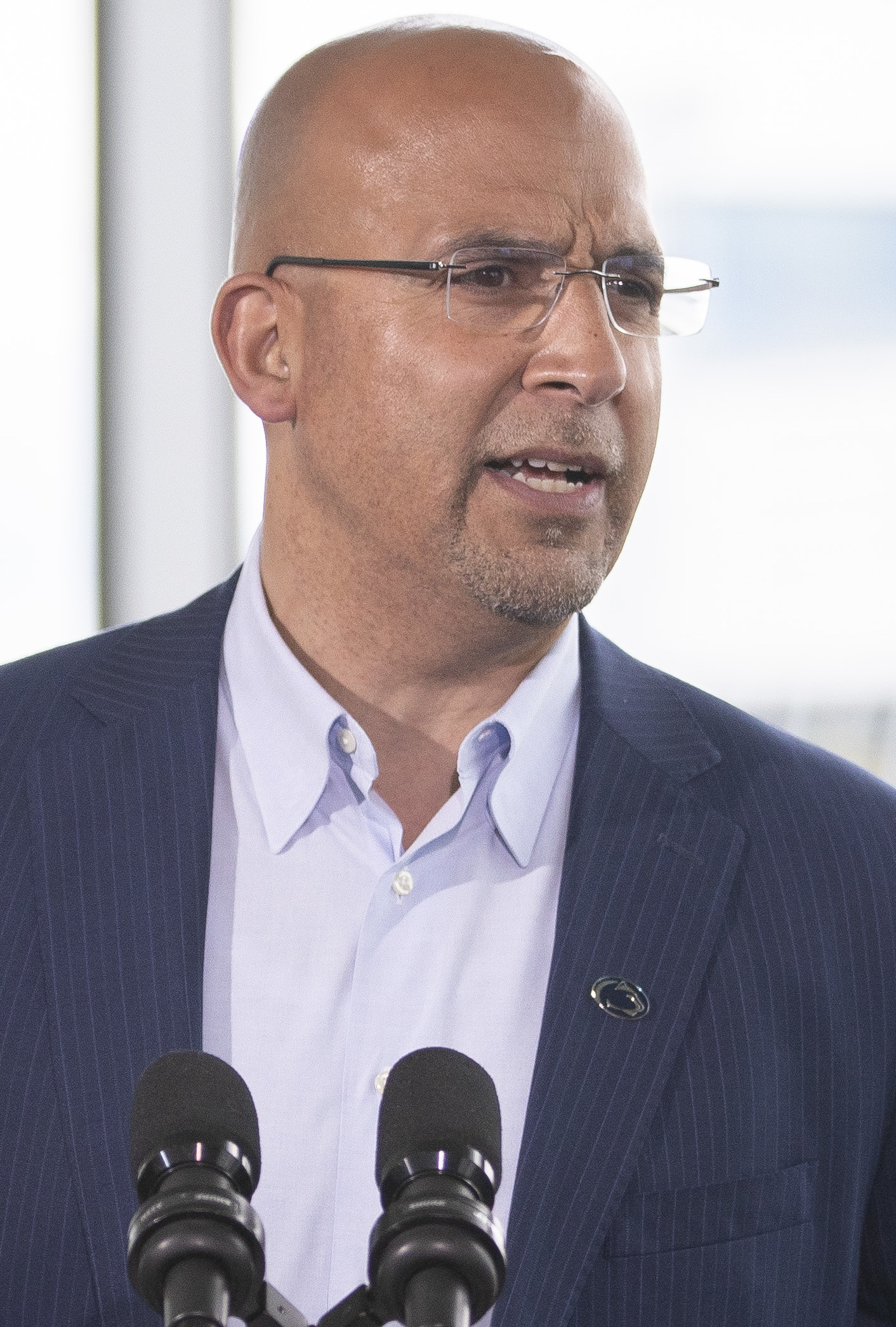
James Franklin, 36th and current head coach of the Virginia Tech Hokies.

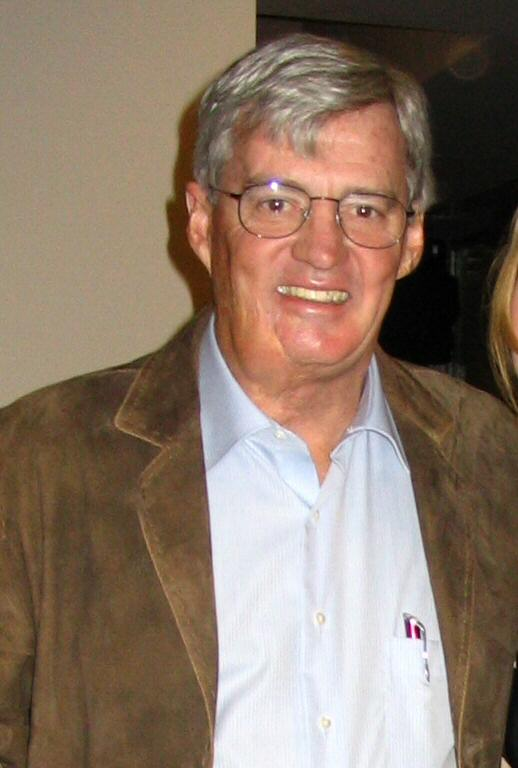
Frank Beamer, 33rd head coach of the Virginia Tech Hokies.

The Virginia Tech Hokies college football team represents Virginia Tech in the Football Bowl Subdivision (FBS) of the National Collegiate Athletic Association (NCAA) and the Coastal Division of the Atlantic Coast Conference (ACC). The program has had 36 head coaches, and 3 interim head coach, since it began play during the 1892 season.

== History ==
- As of the 2025 season, the team has played more than 1,349 games in 133 years under 35 different head coaches and 3 interim coaches.
- Seven head coaches have led the Hokies in postseason bowl games: Jimmy Kitts, Jerry Claiborne, Bill Dooley, Frank Beamer, Justin Fuente, J.C. Price, and Brent Pry.
- Two coaches have won conference championships: Jerry Claiborne, in the Southern Conference in 1963 and Frank Beamer with seven, three in the Big East Conference and four in the ACC.
- Frank Beamer leads in seasons and games coached and wins, with 280 victories in 427 games in 29 seasons. He was the winningest active coach and longest tenured coach in Division I FBS at the time of his retirement in 2015.
- A. B. Morrison, Jr. has the highest winning percentage (.857) and Bob McNeish has the lowest winning percentage (.086).
- Andy Gustafson, Jerry Claiborne, and Frank Beamer have been inducted into the College Football Hall of Fame.

== Key ==
General
#	Number of coaches (Note: A running total of the number of head coaches, with coaches who served separate tenures being counted only once. Interim head coaches are represented with "Int" and are not counted in the running total. "—" indicates the team played but either without a coach or no coach is on record. "X" indicates an interim year without play.)
CCs	Conference championships (Note: Virginia Tech did not join a conference until 1920, and was not a member of a conference from 1965 to 1990.)
†	Elected to the College Football Hall of Fame

Overall games
GC	Games coached
OW	Wins
OL	Losses
OT	Ties (Note: Overtime rules in college football were introduced in 1996, making ties impossible in the period since.)
O%	Winning percentage (Note: When computing the win–loss percentage, a tie counts as half a win and half a loss.)

Conference games
CW	Wins
CL	Losses
CT	Ties
C%	Winning percentage

Postseason games (Note: Although the first Rose Bowl Game was played in 1902, it has been continuously played since the 1916 game, and is recognized as the oldest bowl game by the NCAA. "—" indicates any season prior to 1916 when postseason games were not played.)
PW	Wins
PL	Losses
PT	Ties

== List of head coaches ==
List of head football coaches showing season(s) coached, overall records, conference records, postseason records, championships and selected awards (Note: Statistics correct as of the end of the 2024 NCAA Division I FBS football season.)
#	Name	Season(s) (Note: Virginia Tech did not field teams in 1943 and 1944 due to World War II.)	GC	OW	OL	OT	O%	CW	CL	CT	C%	PW	PL	PT	DC (Note: Divisional champions have advanced to the ACC Championship Game since the institution of divisional play beginning in the 2005 season. Since that time, Virginia Tech has competed as a member of the Coastal division.)	CC	NC	Awards
1	E. A. Smyth	1892–1893	4	1	3	0	0.250	—	—	—	—	—	—	—	—	—	0	—
2	Joseph Massie	1894	5	4	1	0	0.800	—	—	—	—	—	—	—	—	—	0	—
3	Arlie C. Jones	1895–1896	14	9	4	1	0.679	—	—	—	—	—	—	—	—	—	0	—
4	Charles Firth	1897	7	5	2	0	0.714	—	—	—	—	—	—	—	—	—	0	—
5	J. Lewis Ingles	1898	5	3	2	0	0.600	—	—	—	—	—	—	—	—	—	0	—
6	James Morrison	1899	5	4	1	0	0.800	—	—	—	—	—	—	—	—	—	0	—
7	Eugene Davis	1900	7	3	3	1	0.500	—	—	—	—	—	—	—	—	—	0	—
8	A. B. Morrison, Jr.	1901	7	6	1	0	0.857	—	—	—	—	—	—	—	—	—	0	—
9	R. R. Brown	1902	6	3	2	1	0.583	—	—	—	—	—	—	—	—	—	0	—
10	Charles Augustus Lueder	1903	6	5	1	0	0.833	—	—	—	—	—	—	—	—	—	0	—
11	John C. O'Connor	1904	8	5	3	0	0.625	—	—	—	—	—	—	—	—	—	0	—
12	Sally Miles	1905–1906	19	14	3	2	0.737	—	—	—	—	—	—	—	—	—	0	—
13	C. R. Williams	1907	9	7	2	0	0.778	—	—	—	—	—	—	—	—	—	0	—
14	R. M. Brown	1908	9	5	4	0	0.556	—	—	—	—	—	—	—	—	—	0	—
15	Branch Bocock	1909–1910, 1912–1915	50	34	14	2	0.680	—	—	—	—	—	—	—	—	—	0	—
16	Lew Riess	1911	9	6	1	2	0.778	—	—	—	—	—	—	—	—	—	0	—
17	Jack E. Ingersoll	1916	9	7	2	0	0.778	—	—	—	—	0	0	0	—	—	0	—
18	Charles A. Bernier	1917–1919	25	18	6	1	0.740	—	—	—	—	0	0	0	—	—	0	—
19	Stanley Sutton	1920	10	4	6	0	0.400	—	—	—	—	0	0	0	—	—	0	—
20	B. C. Cubbage	1921–1925	48	30	12	6	0.688	13	8	4	0.560	0	0	0	—	—	0	—
21	Andy Gustafson^{†}	1926–1929	36	22	13	1	0.625	11	9	1	0.548	0	0	0	—	—	0	—
22	Orville Neal	1930–1931	18	8	7	3	0.528	3	7	2	0.333	0	0	0	—	—	0	—
23	Henry Redd	1932–1940	88	43	37	8	0.534	25	27	7	0.483	0	0	0	—	—	0	—
24	Jimmy Kitts	1941, 1946–1947	29	13	13	3	0.500	11	8	2	0.571	0	1	0	—	1	0	—
25	Sumner D. Tilson	1942	10	7	2	1	0.750	5	1	0	0.833	0	0	0	—	—	0	—
26	Herbert McEver	1942, 1945	18	9	8	1	0.528	7	6	0	0.538	0	0	0	—	—	0	—
27	Bob McNeish	1948–1950	29	1	25	3	0.086	1	19	3	0.132	0	0	0	—	—	0	—
Int	Allan Learned	1950	4	0	4	0	.000	0	4	0	.000	0	0	0	—	—	0	—
28	Frank Moseley	1951–1960	100	54	42	4	0.560	27	22	2	0.549	0	0	0	—	—	0	—
29	Jerry Claiborne^{†}	1961–1970	102	61	39	2	0.608	12 (Note: Virginia Tech left the Southern Conference in 1965 for various financial and structural reasons. Virginia Tech wanted to schedule more large schools but was prevented from doing so by the Southern Conference schedule. In addition, The Hokies hoped to join the Atlantic Coast Conference.)	7	0	0.632	0	2	0	—	—	0	Neyland Trophy (1994)
30	Charlie Coffey	1971–1973	33	12	20	1	0.379	—	—	—	—	0	0	0	—	—	0	—
31	Jimmy Sharpe	1974–1977	44	21	22	1	0.489	—	—	—	—	0	0	0	—	—	0	—
32	Bill Dooley	1978–1986	102	64 (Note: Includes a forfeit by Temple University during the 1986 season. Temple forfeited game because of an ineligible player.)	37	1	0.632	— (Note: In 1978, Virginia Tech joined the Metro Conference in all sports except football.)	—	—	—	1	2	—	—	—	0	—
33	Frank Beamer^{†}	1987–2015	361	238	121	2	0.659	124	52	0	0.704	11	12	0	5	7	0	AFCA Coach of the Year (1999); AP Coach of the Year (1999); Bobby Dodd Coach of the Year (1999); Eddie Robinson Coach of the Year (1999); George Munger Award (1999); Paul "Bear" Bryant Award (1999); Walter Camp Coach of the Year (1999); Joseph V. Paterno Award (2010); Big East Coach of the Year (1995, 1996, 1999); ACC Coach of the Year (2004, 2005) (Note: The ACC Coach of the Year is voted by Atlantic Coast Sports Media Association (ACSMA).); Neyland Trophy (2017)
34	Justin Fuente	2016–2021	74	43	31	0	0.581	28	20	0	0.583	1	3	0	1	0	0	ACC Coach of the Year (2017)
Int	J. C. Price	2021	3	1	2	0	0.333	1	1	0	0.500	0	1	0	0	0	0	—
35	Brent Pry	2022–2025	40	16	24	0	0.400	10	13	0	0.435	1	1	0	0	0	0	—
Int	Philip Montgomery	2025	9	3	6	0	0.333	2	6	0	0.250	0	0	0	0	0	0	—
36	James Franklin	2026	0	0	0	0	–	0	0	0	–	0	0	0	0	0	0	—
