= 1898 William & Mary Orange and White football team =

American college football season

1898 William & Mary Orange and White football
- Conference: Independent
- Record: 1–1
- Head coach: W. J. King (2nd season)
- Captain: P. B. Jones

1898 Southern college football independents records
	Conf.			Overall
Team	W	L	T	W		L		T
North Carolina		–		9	–	0	–	0
Central (KY)		–		3	–	0	–	1
Oklahoma		–		2	–	0	–	0
Navy		–		7	–	1	–	0
West Virginia		–		6	–	1	–	0
Marshall		–		4	–	1	–	0
Georgetown		–		7	–	3	–	0
Texas A&M		–		4	–	2	–	0
VMI		–		4	–	2	–	0
Arkansas Industrial		–		2	–	1	–	0
Centre		–		2	–	1	–	2
VPI		–		3	–	2	–	0
Virginia		–		6	–	5	–	0
Richmond		–		3	–	3	–	1
Davidson		–		1	–	1	–	0
William & Mary		–		1	–	1	–	0
South Carolina		–		1	–	2	–	0
Delaware		–		2	–	5	–	2
Columbian		–		3	–	6	–	0
North Carolina A&M		–		1	–	2	–	0
Add-Ran		–		1	–	3	–	1
Maryland		–		2	–	6	–	1
Guilford		–		0	–	3	–	0

The 1898 William & Mary Orange and White football team represented the College of William & Mary during the 1898 college football season. The season marked the first meeting between William & Mary and the University of Richmond, which later became known as the I-64 Bowl—so named for the highway between the two nearby schools—and eventually as the Capital Cup. Richmond won the inaugural contest 15–0.

== Schedule ==
Date	Opponent	Site	Result	Source
November 7	Randolph–Macon		W 5–0	
November 19	at Richmond	Broad Street Park; Richmond, VA (rivalry)	L 0–15	
