= 1898 Centre football team =

American college football season

1898 Centre football
- Conference: Independent
- Record: 2–2–1
- Head coach: Dick Van Winkle (1st season)

1898 Southern college football independents records
	Conf.			Overall
Team	W	L	T	W		L		T
North Carolina		–		9	–	0	–	0
Central (KY)		–		3	–	0	–	1
Oklahoma		–		2	–	0	–	0
Navy		–		7	–	1	–	0
West Virginia		–		6	–	1	–	0
Marshall		–		4	–	1	–	0
Georgetown		–		7	–	3	–	0
Texas A&M		–		4	–	2	–	0
VMI		–		4	–	2	–	0
Arkansas Industrial		–		2	–	1	–	0
Centre		–		2	–	1	–	2
VPI		–		3	–	2	–	0
Virginia		–		6	–	5	–	0
Richmond		–		3	–	3	–	1
Davidson		–		1	–	1	–	0
William & Mary		–		1	–	1	–	0
South Carolina		–		1	–	2	–	0
Delaware		–		2	–	5	–	2
Columbian		–		3	–	6	–	0
North Carolina A&M		–		1	–	2	–	0
Add-Ran		–		1	–	3	–	1
Maryland		–		2	–	6	–	1
Guilford		–		0	–	3	–	0

The 1898 Centre football team represented Centre College as an independent the 1898 college football season. Led by Dick Van Winkle in his first and only season as head coach, Centre compiled a record of 2–2–1.

== Schedule ==
Date	Opponent	Site	Result	Source
November 5	at Kentucky State College	Lexington, KY (rivalry)	L 0–6	
November 12	Newcastle Athletic Club		T 5–5	
November 19	at Louisville Athletic Club	Louisville, KY	W 10–0	
November 21	Georgetown (KY)	Danville, KY	W 10–0	
November 24	at Central (KY)	Richmond, KY	L 0–30	
