= Oscar Lee Owens =

American football coach

Biographical details
- Born: February 21, 1877; Nansemond County, Virginia, U.S.
- Died: October 25, 1954 (aged 77); Oklahoma, U.S.
- Education: Richmond College (1894–1898); George Washington University (1908)

Coaching career (HC unless noted)
- 1898: Richmond

Head coaching record
- Overall: 3–3–1

Oscar Lee Owens (February 21, 1877 – October 25, 1954) was an American college football coach and educator. He was the ninth head football coach at Richmond College—now known as the University of Richmond—in Richmond, Virginia, serving for one season, in 1898, and compiling record of 3–3–1.

A native of Windsor, Virginia, Owens attended Richmond College and George Washington University. He later lived in Baltimore, Maryland and earned a doctorate at Johns Hopkins University. Owens served in the United States Army during World War I. He moved to Oklahoma in 1936 and spent ten years as head of the history department at Oklahoma City University. Owens later worked a counselor for the Oklahoma State employment service. He died on October 25, 1954.

== Head coaching record ==
Year	Team	Overall	Conference	Standing	Bowl/playoffs
Richmond Spiders (Independent) (1898)
1898	Richmond	3–3–1			
Richmond:		3–3–1			
Total:		3–3–1			
