= William Fitz Donovan =

American football player and coach (1873–1930)

Biographical details
- Born: April 13, 1873; Virginia, U.S.
- Died: March 22, 1930 (aged 56); San Francisco, California, U.S.

Playing career
- 1891–1894: Brown
- Position: Quarterback

Coaching career (HC unless noted)
- 1898: Georgetown

Head coaching record
- Overall: 7–3

William Fitz Donovan (April 13, 1873 – March 22, 1930) was an American college football player and coach. He served as the head football coach at Georgetown University in Washington, D.C. in 1898, compiling a record of 7–3. Donovan played football as a quarterback at Brown University. He died on March 22, 1930, in San Francisco.

== Head coaching record ==
Year	Team	Overall	Conference	Standing	Bowl/playoffs
Georgetown Blue and Gray (Independent) (1898)
1898	Georgetown	7–3			
Georgetown:		7–3			
Total:		7–3			
