= 1898 Arkansas Industrial Cardinals football team =

American college football season

1898 Arkansas Industrial Cardinals football
- Conference: Independent
- Record: 2–1
- Head coach: B. N. Wilson (2nd season)
- Captain: Edward Martin

1898 Southern college football independents records
	Conf.			Overall
Team	W	L	T	W		L		T
North Carolina		–		9	–	0	–	0
Central (KY)		–		3	–	0	–	1
Oklahoma		–		2	–	0	–	0
Navy		–		7	–	1	–	0
West Virginia		–		6	–	1	–	0
Marshall		–		4	–	1	–	0
Georgetown		–		7	–	3	–	0
Texas A&M		–		4	–	2	–	0
VMI		–		4	–	2	–	0
Arkansas Industrial		–		2	–	1	–	0
Centre		–		2	–	1	–	2
VPI		–		3	–	2	–	0
Virginia		–		6	–	5	–	0
Richmond		–		3	–	3	–	1
Davidson		–		1	–	1	–	0
William & Mary		–		1	–	1	–	0
South Carolina		–		1	–	2	–	0
Delaware		–		2	–	5	–	2
Columbian		–		3	–	6	–	0
North Carolina A&M		–		1	–	2	–	0
Add-Ran		–		1	–	3	–	1
Maryland		–		2	–	6	–	1
Guilford		–		0	–	3	–	0

The 1898 Arkansas Industrial Cardinals football team represented the University of Arkansas during the 1898 college football season The team played two intercollegiate football games, both against Drury. Arkansas won both games, the first by a 17–0 score and the second by a 12–6 score. The Cardinals concluded their season with a 36–8 loss against Fort Scott High School.

== Schedule ==
Date	Time	Opponent	Site	Result	Source
October 29		Drury	Fayetteville, AR	W 17–0	
November 17	3:00 p.m.	at Drury	Drury athletic field; Springfield, MO	W 12–6	
November 19		at Fort Scott association team	Fort Scott, KS	L 6–36	
