= 1898 Guilford Quakers football team =

American college football season

1898 Guilford Quakers football
- Conference: Independent
- Record: 0–3
- Head coach: Unknown

1898 Southern college football independents records
	Conf.			Overall
Team	W	L	T	W		L		T
North Carolina		–		9	–	0	–	0
Central (KY)		–		3	–	0	–	1
Oklahoma		–		2	–	0	–	0
Navy		–		7	–	1	–	0
West Virginia		–		6	–	1	–	0
Marshall		–		4	–	1	–	0
Georgetown		–		7	–	3	–	0
Texas A&M		–		4	–	2	–	0
VMI		–		4	–	2	–	0
Arkansas Industrial		–		2	–	1	–	0
Centre		–		2	–	1	–	2
VPI		–		3	–	2	–	0
Virginia		–		6	–	5	–	0
Richmond		–		3	–	3	–	1
Davidson		–		1	–	1	–	0
William & Mary		–		1	–	1	–	0
South Carolina		–		1	–	2	–	0
Delaware		–		2	–	5	–	2
Columbian		–		3	–	6	–	0
North Carolina A&M		–		1	–	2	–	0
Add-Ran		–		1	–	3	–	1
Maryland		–		2	–	6	–	1
Guilford		–		0	–	3	–	0

The 1898 Guilford Quakers football team represented Guilford College as an independent during the 1898 college football season. Guilford played three games and went winless.

== Schedule ==
Date	Opponent	Site	Result	Attendance	Source
October 1	North Carolina	Chapel Hill, NC	L 0–18		
November 5	VPI	Greensboro, NC	L 0–17		
November 24	North Carolina A&M	State Fairgrounds; Raleigh, NC	L 0–21	500	
