= Frank Kenly =

American football player and coach (1877–1944)

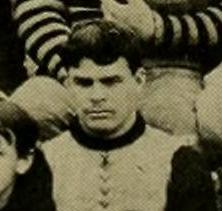
- Kenly at Maryland in 1896

Biographical details
- Born: April 18, 1877; Level, Maryland, U.S.
- Died: February 21, 1944 (aged 66); Baltimore, Maryland, U.S.

Playing career
- 1896–1898: Maryland
- Position: Quarterback

Coaching career (HC unless noted)
- 1898: Maryland

Head coaching record
- Overall: 2–5–1

James Frank Kenly Jr. (April 18, 1877 – February 21, 1944) was an American engineer and college football player and coach. He served as the head football coach at Maryland Agricultural College—now known as the University of Maryland, College Park—for one season, in 1898, compiling a record of 2–5–1.

== Biography ==
Kenly was born in Harford County near Level, Maryland on April 18, 1877. He enrolled at the Maryland Agricultural College in 1895, and played on the football team from 1896 to 1898 as a quarterback. In 1898, he served as the team's head coach and captain, and Maryland amassed a 2–5–1 record. After the season, the Reveille yearbook wrote, "Manager McCandlish and Captain Kenly worked faithfully with the material they had, but the team was deficient in weight as compared with the others of the league." He graduated from the Maryland Agricultural College in 1899 with a degree in mechanical engineering. Kenly worked for the Port Chester Bolt and Nut Company, Baldwin Locomotive Works, York Safe and Lock Company, H. S. Kerbaugh, Inc., American Bridge Company, Pennsylvania Steel Company, and the Carnegie Steel Company.

Kenly was married to Mavourneen (née Williams) Kenly. He later worked at the Federal Reserve Bank of Richmond Baltimore Branch. He died of a heart attack on February 21, 1944, at his home in Baltimore, Maryland.

== Head coaching record ==
Year	Team	Overall	Conference	Standing	Bowl/playoffs
Maryland Aggies (Independent) (1898)
1898	Maryland	2–5–1			
Maryland:		2–5–1			
Total:		2–5–1			
