= 1898 Add-Ran Christian football team =

American college football season

1898 Add-Ran Christian football
- Conference: Independent
- Record: 1–3–1
- Head coach: James Morrison (1st season)
- Home stadium: Padgitt's Park

1898 Southern college football independents records
	Conf.			Overall
Team	W	L	T	W		L		T
North Carolina		–		9	–	0	–	0
Central (KY)		–		3	–	0	–	1
Oklahoma		–		2	–	0	–	0
Navy		–		7	–	1	–	0
West Virginia		–		6	–	1	–	0
Marshall		–		4	–	1	–	0
Georgetown		–		7	–	3	–	0
Texas A&M		–		4	–	2	–	0
VMI		–		4	–	2	–	0
Arkansas Industrial		–		2	–	1	–	0
Centre		–		2	–	1	–	2
VPI		–		3	–	2	–	0
Virginia		–		6	–	5	–	0
Richmond		–		3	–	3	–	1
Davidson		–		1	–	1	–	0
William & Mary		–		1	–	1	–	0
South Carolina		–		1	–	2	–	0
Delaware		–		2	–	5	–	2
Columbian		–		3	–	6	–	0
North Carolina A&M		–		1	–	2	–	0
Add-Ran		–		1	–	3	–	1
Maryland		–		2	–	6	–	1
Guilford		–		0	–	3	–	0

The 1898 Add-Ran Christian football team represented Add-Ran Christian University—now known as Texas Christian University (TCU)—as an independent during the 1898 college football season. They played their home games in Waco, Texas.

== Schedule ==
Date	Time	Opponent	Site	Result	Attendance	Source
October 15	3:40 p.m.	Texas	Padgitt's Park; Waco, TX (rivalry)	L 0–16	600–700	
November 2	3:30 p.m.	Toby's Business College	Padgitt's Park; Waco, TX	W 34–0		
November 5	3:30 p.m.	at Texas	Varsity Athletic Field; Austin, TX	L 0–29		
November 12	3:30 p.m.	Fort Worth	Padgitt's Park; Waco, TX	T 0–0		
November 24	3:30 p.m.	Texas A&M	Padgitt's Park; Waco, TX (rivalry)	L 0–16		
