= 1898 Navy Midshipmen football team =

American college football season

1898 Navy Midshipmen football
- Conference: Independent
- Record: 7–1
- Head coach: Bill Armstrong (2nd season)
- Captain: Charles Fischer
- Home stadium: Worden Field

1898 Southern college football independents records
	Conf.			Overall
Team	W	L	T	W		L		T
North Carolina		–		9	–	0	–	0
Central (KY)		–		3	–	0	–	1
Oklahoma		–		2	–	0	–	0
Navy		–		7	–	1	–	0
West Virginia		–		6	–	1	–	0
Marshall		–		4	–	1	–	0
Georgetown		–		7	–	3	–	0
Texas A&M		–		4	–	2	–	0
VMI		–		4	–	2	–	0
Arkansas Industrial		–		2	–	1	–	0
Centre		–		2	–	1	–	2
VPI		–		3	–	2	–	0
Virginia		–		6	–	5	–	0
Richmond		–		3	–	3	–	1
Davidson		–		1	–	1	–	0
William & Mary		–		1	–	1	–	0
South Carolina		–		1	–	2	–	0
Delaware		–		2	–	5	–	2
Columbian		–		3	–	6	–	0
North Carolina A&M		–		1	–	2	–	0
Add-Ran		–		1	–	3	–	1
Maryland		–		2	–	6	–	1
Guilford		–		0	–	3	–	0

The 1898 Navy Midshipmen football team represented the United States Naval Academy during the 1898 college football season. In their second season under head coach Bill Armstrong, the Midshipmen compiled a 7–1 record, shut out three opponents, and outscored all opponents by a combined score of 130 to 56. The Army–Navy Game was canceled due to Presidential cabinet order.

== Schedule ==
Date	Time	Opponent	Site	Result	Source
October 8	3:00 p.m.	Bucknell	Worden Field; Annapolis, MD	W 11–0	
October 15		Princeton	Worden Field; Annapolis, MD	L 0–30	
October 22		Penn State	Worden Field; Annapolis, MD	W 16–11	
October 29		Lafayette	Worden Field; Annapolis, MD	W 18–0	
November 5		Columbian	Worden Field; Annapolis, MD	W 52–5	
November 12		Lehigh	Worden Field; Annapolis, MD	W 6–5	
November 19		at Virginia	Madison Hall Field; Charlottesville, VA	W 6–0	
November 24		VMI	Worden Field; Annapolis, MD	W 21–5	
