= WakeyLeaks =

College football scandal

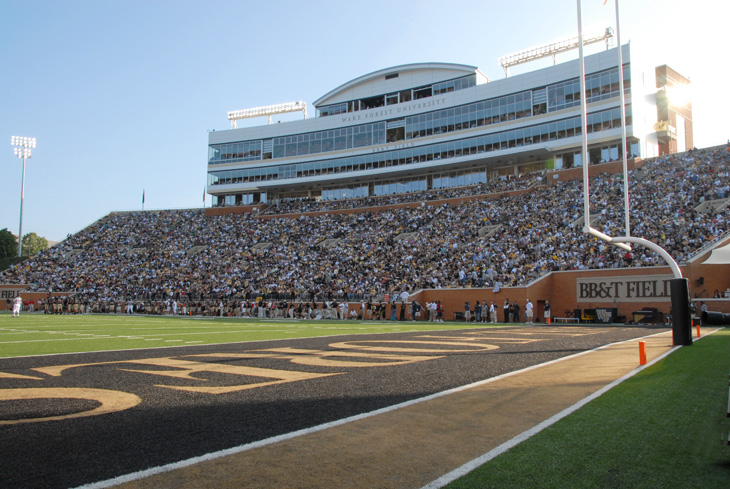
BB&T Field, the home stadium of the Wake Forest Demon Deacons football program, in 2009

WakeyLeaks was a college football scandal involving leaked playbook information from the Wake Forest Demon Deacons football team. The nickname of this scandal is a reference to WikiLeaks, a news organization known for anonymously publishing leaked classified documents.

Claims that the playbook had leaked first surfaced on November 16, 2016 after an investigation was opened into allegations that Louisville had access to the Demon Deacons playbook from documents found in the Cardinals locker room following their 44-12 win in Winston-Salem.

A tweet by Outer Banks-based news broadcaster and writer Sam Walker using #Wakeyleaks the same day was the first to reference the scandal as such on social media, with the hashtag going viral one month later.

On December 13, 2016, Wake Forest University announced that Tommy Elrod, a former Demon Deacon player and assistant coach, had provided or attempted to provide confidential game preparations to opponents several times starting in 2014. Elrod had been fired from the program prior to the 2014 season, leading many to speculate that revenge was his motivation. However, Elrod has never publicly commented on the matter.

Many were caught in the scandal's fallout. Elrod was fired from the IMG Radio Network and banned from Wake Forest athletics and facilities. The University of Louisville, Virginia Tech, Georgia assistant coach Shane Beamer, and Army defensive coordinator Jay Bateman were all fined $25,000. However, WakeyLeaks has been noted for receiving surprisingly little attention. It has been described as "the scandal that should have rocked college football".

WakeyLeaks has been credited with sparking the program to unprecedented success. Wake Forest changed from being one of the most open programs in the country to being one of the most secure. Offensive coordinator Warren Ruggiero created a new scheme that drastically improved Wake Forest's average points-per-game. By 2021, the program had reached its highest final ranking ever in the AP Poll.
