= 1898 Oklahoma Sooners football team =

American college football season

1898 Oklahoma Sooners football
- Conference: Independent
- Record: 2–0
- Head coach: Vernon Louis Parrington (2nd season)
- Captain: C. C. Roberts

1898 Southern college football independents records
	Conf.			Overall
Team	W	L	T	W		L		T
North Carolina		–		9	–	0	–	0
Central (KY)		–		3	–	0	–	1
Oklahoma		–		2	–	0	–	0
Navy		–		7	–	1	–	0
West Virginia		–		6	–	1	–	0
Marshall		–		4	–	1	–	0
Georgetown		–		7	–	3	–	0
Texas A&M		–		4	–	2	–	0
VMI		–		4	–	2	–	0
Arkansas Industrial		–		2	–	1	–	0
Centre		–		2	–	1	–	2
VPI		–		3	–	2	–	0
Virginia		–		6	–	5	–	0
Richmond		–		3	–	3	–	1
Davidson		–		1	–	1	–	0
William & Mary		–		1	–	1	–	0
South Carolina		–		1	–	2	–	0
Delaware		–		2	–	5	–	2
Columbian		–		3	–	6	–	0
North Carolina A&M		–		1	–	2	–	0
Add-Ran		–		1	–	3	–	1
Maryland		–		2	–	6	–	1
Guilford		–		0	–	3	–	0

The 1898 Oklahoma Sooners football team represented the University of Oklahoma as an independent during the 1898 college football season. In their fourth year of football, and second year under head coach Vernon Louis Parrington, the Sooners compiled a 2–0 record, and outscored their opponents by a combined total of 29 to 0. This was the first season in which the team competed outside Oklahoma Territory, playing a road game against an Arkansas City, Kansas town team.

== Schedule ==
Date	Time	Opponent	Site	Result	Source
November 4	3:00 p.m.	at Arkansas City Tigers	Athletic Park; Arkansas City, KS	W 5–0	
November 24		Fort Worth University	Norman, Oklahoma Territory	W 24–0	
