= Davidson football, 1896–1899 =

American college football seasons

The Davidson football team (later known as the Davidson Wildcats) represented Davidson College in American football. The football program started in 1896 with a game against the Charlotte YMCA. After not fielding a team in 1897, the program played two games in 1898 and a six-game schedule in 1899. The team did not hire a coach until 1900 when John A. Brewin began his four-year tenure as head coach. This article covers the program's early years prior to the hiring of Brewin as the school's first head football coach.

== 1896 ==
1896 Davidson football
- Conference: Independent
- Record: 0–1
- Head coach: None
- Home stadium: Latta Park Baseball Field

1896 Southern college football independents records
	Conf.			Overall
Team	W	L	T	W		L		T
Centre		–		6	–	0	–	1
Texas A&M		–		2	–	0	–	1
Oklahoma		–		2	–	0	–	0
North Carolina A&M		–		1	–	0	–	0
Virginia		–		7	–	2	–	2
VPI		–		5	–	2	–	1
Navy		–		5	–	3	–	0
Arkansas		–		2	–	1	–	0
Clemson		–		2	–	1	–	0
Columbian		–		2	–	1	–	0
Georgia Tech		–		2	–	2	–	1
Add-Ran		–		1	–	1	–	1
Centenary		–		1	–	1	–	0
VMI		–		3	–	4	–	0
North Carolina		–		3	–	4	–	1
Furman		–		2	–	3	–	0
Ole Miss		–		1	–	2	–	0
West Virginia		–		3	–	7	–	2
South Carolina		–		1	–	3	–	0
Erskine		–		0	–	1	–	0
William & Mary		–		0	–	2	–	0
Davidson		–		0	–	1	–	0
Delaware		–		0	–	6	–	0

The 1896 Davidson football team was an American football team represented Davidson College as an independent during the 1896 college football season. The team compiled a 0–1 record and played just one match against the Charlotte YMCA on their own campus.

Date	Opponent	Site	Result	Source
October 19	Charlotte YMCA	Davidson, NC	L 4–12	

== 1898 ==
1898 Davidson football
- Conference: Independent
- Record: 1–1
- Head coach: None
- Home stadium: Latta Park Baseball Field

1898 Southern college football independents records
	Conf.			Overall
Team	W	L	T	W		L		T
North Carolina		–		9	–	0	–	0
Central (KY)		–		3	–	0	–	1
Oklahoma		–		2	–	0	–	0
Navy		–		7	–	1	–	0
West Virginia		–		6	–	1	–	0
Marshall		–		4	–	1	–	0
Georgetown		–		7	–	3	–	0
Texas A&M		–		4	–	2	–	0
VMI		–		4	–	2	–	0
Arkansas Industrial		–		2	–	1	–	0
Centre		–		2	–	1	–	2
VPI		–		3	–	2	–	0
Virginia		–		6	–	5	–	0
Richmond		–		3	–	3	–	1
Davidson		–		1	–	1	–	0
William & Mary		–		1	–	1	–	0
South Carolina		–		1	–	2	–	0
Delaware		–		2	–	5	–	2
Columbian		–		3	–	6	–	0
North Carolina A&M		–		1	–	2	–	0
Add-Ran		–		1	–	3	–	1
Maryland		–		2	–	6	–	1
Guilford		–		0	–	3	–	0

The 1898 Davidson football team was an American football team represented Davidson College as an independent during the 1898 college football season. The team compiled a 1–1 record and played both games at Charlotte, North Carolina. After a loss to North Carolina, Davidson secured their first win in program history against South Carolina by a score of 5–0.

Date	Opponent	Site	Result	Source
November 5	vs. North Carolina	Latta Park Baseball Field; Charlotte, NC	L 0–11	
November 24	vs. South Carolina	Latta Park Baseball Field; Charlotte, NC	W 5–0	

== 1899 ==
1899 Davidson football
- Conference: Independent
- Record: 1–3–1
- Head coach: None
- Home stadium: Latta Park Baseball Field

1899 Southern college football independents records
	Conf.			Overall
Team	W	L	T	W		L		T
VMI		–		1	–	0	–	0
VPI		–		4	–	1	–	0
Delaware		–		6	–	2	–	0
Arkansas		–		3	–	1	–	1
Georgetown		–		5	–	2	–	1
Texas A&M		–		4	–	2	–	0
Oklahoma		–		2	–	1	–	0
Baylor		–		2	–	1	–	1
Guilford		–		2	–	1	–	1
Navy		–		5	–	3	–	0
Virginia		–		4	–	3	–	2
Add-Ran		–		0	–	0	–	1
Richmond		–		2	–	2	–	0
South Carolina		–		2	–	3	–	0
West Virginia		–		2	–	3	–	0
William & Mary		–		2	–	3	–	0
North Carolina A&M		–		1	–	2	–	2
Davidson		–		1	–	3	–	1
Maryland		–		1	–	4	–	0
Marshall		–		0	–	0	–	1

The 1899 Davidson football team was an American football team represented Davidson College as an independent during the 1899 college football season, and the team compiled a 1–3–1. After they opened the season with three consecutive losses, Davidson had their first all time tie in program history with a scoreless game against North Carolina A&M.

Date	Opponent	Site	Result	Source
October 14	vs. Clemson	Rock Hill, SC	L 0–10	
October 21	vs. North Carolina	Latta Park Baseball Field; Charlotte, NC	L 0–10	
November 11	Oak Ridge Institute	Davidson, NC	L 2–6	
November 17	vs. North Carolina A&M	Latta Park Baseball Field; Charlotte, NC	T 0–0	
November 30	vs. South Carolina	Latta Park Baseball Field; Charlotte, NC	W 5–0	
