= 1898 Central Colonels football team =

American college football season

1898 Central Colonels football
- Conference: Independent
- Record: 3–0–1
- Head coach: None

1898 Southern college football independents records
	Conf.			Overall
Team	W	L	T	W		L		T
North Carolina		–		9	–	0	–	0
Central (KY)		–		3	–	0	–	1
Oklahoma		–		2	–	0	–	0
Navy		–		7	–	1	–	0
West Virginia		–		6	–	1	–	0
Marshall		–		4	–	1	–	0
Georgetown		–		7	–	3	–	0
Texas A&M		–		4	–	2	–	0
VMI		–		4	–	2	–	0
Arkansas Industrial		–		2	–	1	–	0
Centre		–		2	–	1	–	2
VPI		–		3	–	2	–	0
Virginia		–		6	–	5	–	0
Richmond		–		3	–	3	–	1
Davidson		–		1	–	1	–	0
William & Mary		–		1	–	1	–	0
South Carolina		–		1	–	2	–	0
Delaware		–		2	–	5	–	2
Columbian		–		3	–	6	–	0
North Carolina A&M		–		1	–	2	–	0
Add-Ran		–		1	–	3	–	1
Maryland		–		2	–	6	–	1
Guilford		–		0	–	3	–	0

The 1898 Central Colonels football team represented Central University in Richmond, Kentucky during the 1898 college football season. The team defeated Vanderbilt and Centre.

== Schedule ==
Date	Opponent	Site	Result	Source
October 15	Kentucky University		W 45–0	
?	at New Castle A. C.		T	
November 19	at Vanderbilt	Dudley Field; Nashville, TN	W 10–0	
November 24	Centre	Richmond, KY	W 30–0	
