= 1898 Georgetown Blue and Gray football team =

American college football season

1898 Georgetown Blue and Gray football
- Conference: Independent
- Record: 7–3
- Head coach: William Fitz Donovan (1st season)
- Captain: Jack Casey
- Home stadium: Georgetown Field

1898 Southern college football independents records
	Conf.			Overall
Team	W	L	T	W		L		T
North Carolina		–		9	–	0	–	0
Central (KY)		–		3	–	0	–	1
Oklahoma		–		2	–	0	–	0
Navy		–		7	–	1	–	0
West Virginia		–		6	–	1	–	0
Marshall		–		4	–	1	–	0
Georgetown		–		7	–	3	–	0
Texas A&M		–		4	–	2	–	0
VMI		–		4	–	2	–	0
Arkansas Industrial		–		2	–	1	–	0
Centre		–		2	–	1	–	2
VPI		–		3	–	2	–	0
Virginia		–		6	–	5	–	0
Richmond		–		3	–	3	–	1
Davidson		–		1	–	1	–	0
William & Mary		–		1	–	1	–	0
South Carolina		–		1	–	2	–	0
Delaware		–		2	–	5	–	2
Columbian		–		3	–	6	–	0
North Carolina A&M		–		1	–	2	–	0
Add-Ran		–		1	–	3	–	1
Maryland		–		2	–	6	–	1
Guilford		–		0	–	3	–	0

The 1898 Georgetown Blue and Gray football team represented Georgetown University during the 1898 college football season. Led by William Fitz Donovan, in his first and only year as head coach, the Blue and Gray had a record of 7–3.

== Schedule ==
Date	Time	Opponent	Site	Result	Attendance	Source
October 12		Swarthmore	Georgetown Field; Washington, DC	L 6–11	1,000	
October 14		Baltimore Medical	Georgetown Field; Washington, DC	W 40–0		
October 19		Gallaudet	Georgetown Field; Washington, DC	W 11–0		
October 22		at Virginia	Madison Hall Field; Charlottesville, VA	W 10–0		
November 5		Villanova	Georgetown Field; Washington, DC	W 12–0		
November 8		Virginia	Georgetown Field; Washington, DC	L 0–12		
November 12	3:52 p.m.	vs. VMI	Broad Street Park; Richmond, VA	W 11–5	1,000	
November 15		Baltimore Medical	Georgetown Field; Washington, DC	W 35–0		
November 18		Gallaudet	Georgetown Field; Washington, DC	L 6–17		
November 24	2:50 p.m.	Columbian	Georgetown Field; Washington, DC	W 12–5	4,000	
