= 1898 North Carolina Tar Heels football team =

American college football season

1898 North Carolina Tar Heels football

Southern champion
- Conference: Independent
- Record: 9–0
- Head coach: William A. Reynolds (2nd season)
- Captain: Frank O. Rogers
- Home stadium: Campus Athletic Field (I)

1898 Southern college football independents records
	Conf.			Overall
Team	W	L	T	W		L		T
North Carolina		–		9	–	0	–	0
Central (KY)		–		3	–	0	–	1
Oklahoma		–		2	–	0	–	0
Navy		–		7	–	1	–	0
West Virginia		–		6	–	1	–	0
Marshall		–		4	–	1	–	0
Georgetown		–		7	–	3	–	0
Texas A&M		–		4	–	2	–	0
VMI		–		4	–	2	–	0
Arkansas Industrial		–		2	–	1	–	0
Centre		–		2	–	1	–	2
VPI		–		3	–	2	–	0
Virginia		–		6	–	5	–	0
Richmond		–		3	–	3	–	1
Davidson		–		1	–	1	–	0
William & Mary		–		1	–	1	–	0
South Carolina		–		1	–	2	–	0
Delaware		–		2	–	5	–	2
Columbian		–		3	–	6	–	0
North Carolina A&M		–		1	–	2	–	0
Add-Ran		–		1	–	3	–	1
Maryland		–		2	–	6	–	1
Guilford		–		0	–	3	–	0

The 1898 North Carolina Tar Heels football team represented the University of North Carolina in the 1898 college football season. They played nine games with a final record of 9–0. The team captain for the 1898 season was Frank O. Rogers. The team claims a Southern championship.

== Schedule ==
Date	Time	Opponent	Site	Result	Attendance	Source
October 1	2:00 p.m.	Guilford	Campus Athletic Field (I); Chapel Hill, NC	W 18–0		
October 15	4:00 p.m.	North Carolina A&M	Campus Athletic Field (I); Chapel Hill, NC (rivalry)	W 34–0		
October 20	2:00 p.m.	Greensboro A.A.	Campus Athletic Field (I); Chapel Hill, NC	W 11–0		
October 29		Oak Ridge	Campus Athletic Field (I); Chapel Hill, NC	W 11–0		
November 4	11:00 a.m.	vs. VPI	South Side Park; Winston-Salem, NC	W 28–6		
November 5	3:30 p.m.	Davidson	Latta Park; Charlotte, NC	W 11–0		
November 12		vs. Georgia	Central City Park; Macon, GA	W 53–0	1,000	
November 15	4:00 p.m.	Auburn	Drill Field; Auburn, AL	W 29–0		
November 24	2:30 p.m.	vs. Virginia	Broad Street Park (I); Richmond, VA (South's Oldest Rivalry)	W 6–2	3,000	

== Game summaries ==
=== Guilford ===
The season opened with an 18–0 defeat of the Guilford Quakers. Charles Baskerville was umpire.

The starting lineup was Tate (left end), Shull (left tackle), Miller (left guard), Cunningham (center), Cromartie (right guard), Bennett (right tackle), Klotz (right end), Rogers (quarterback), Howell (left halfback), Gregory (right halfback), Graves (fullback).

=== North Carolina A&M ===
In the second week of play, the Tar Heels defeated the in-state rival North Carolina A&M 34–0.

=== Greensboro A. A. ===
Against the Greensboro Athletic Association, UNC won 11–0.

=== Oak Ridge ===
Oak Ridge was beaten 11–0.

=== V. P. I. ===
Touchdowns were made by Bennett, Gregory, Copeland, Shull, and Howell in a 28–6 win over V. P. I.

=== Davidson ===
North Carolina beat Davidson 11–0.

=== Georgia ===
In Macon, the Tar Heels blew out the Georgia Bulldogs 53–0. Tick Tichenor wrote "Such a crush defeat as Georgia sustained at the hands of North Carolina today is almost unparalleled in football".

The starting lineup was Klotz (left end), Shull (left tackle), Cromartie (left guard), Cunningham (center), Phifer (right guard), Bennett (right tackle), Gregoy (right end), Rodgers (quarterback), Austin (left halfback), McRae (right halfback), Graves (fullback).

=== Auburn ===
The Tar Heels won over John Heisman's Auburn Tigers 29–0.

=== Virginia ===
UNC beat rival Virginia, 6–2, for its first win since the first year of the South's Oldest Rivalry. The safety was made just as time called, and Howell scored for UNC.

== Players ==
=== Line ===
Player	Position	Games started	Hometown	Prep school	Height	Weight	Age
Frank Bennett	tackle		Wadesboro, North Carolina		6'0"	173	
Cromartie	guard						
Cunningham	center						
Edwin Gregory	end						
Herman Koehler	end		Upper Montclair, New Jersey			160	
Phifer	guard						
Shull	tackle						

=== Backfield ===
Player	Position	Games started	Hometown	Prep school	Height	Weight	Age
Copeland	halfback						
Louis Graves	fullback		Chapel Hill, North Carolina				
Jim MacRae	halfback		Fayetteville, North Carolina	Nashville			
Frank O. Rogers	quarterback		Salisbury, North Carolina			160	
