= 1898 VMI Keydets football team =

American college football season

1898 VMI Keydets football
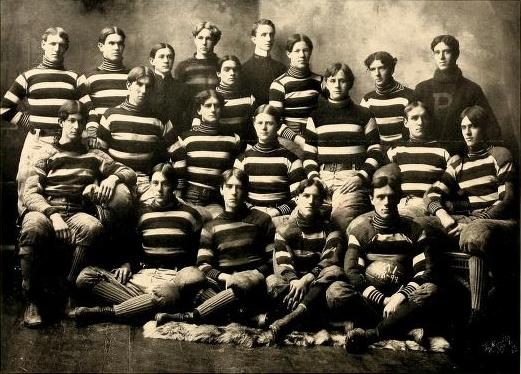
- Conference: Independent
- Record: 4–2
- Head coach: Sam Boyle (1st season)

1898 Southern college football independents records
| | Conf. | | | Overall |
| Team | W | L | T | W | | L | | T |
|---|---|---|---|---|---|---|---|---|
| North Carolina | | – | | 9 | – | 0 | – | 0 |
| Central (KY) | | – | | 3 | – | 0 | – | 1 |
| Oklahoma | | – | | 2 | – | 0 | – | 0 |
| Navy | | – | | 7 | – | 1 | – | 0 |
| West Virginia | | – | | 6 | – | 1 | – | 0 |
| Marshall | | – | | 4 | – | 1 | – | 0 |
| Georgetown | | – | | 7 | – | 3 | – | 0 |
| Texas A&M | | – | | 4 | – | 2 | – | 0 |
| VMI | | – | | 4 | – | 2 | – | 0 |
| Arkansas Industrial | | – | | 2 | – | 1 | – | 0 |
| Centre | | – | | 2 | – | 1 | – | 2 |
| VPI | | – | | 3 | – | 2 | – | 0 |
| Virginia | | – | | 6 | – | 5 | – | 0 |
| Richmond | | – | | 3 | – | 3 | – | 1 |
| Davidson | | – | | 1 | – | 1 | – | 0 |
| William & Mary | | – | | 1 | – | 1 | – | 0 |
| South Carolina | | – | | 1 | – | 2 | – | 0 |
| Delaware | | – | | 2 | – | 5 | – | 2 |
| Columbian | | – | | 3 | – | 6 | – | 0 |
| North Carolina A&M | | – | | 1 | – | 2 | – | 0 |
| Add-Ran | | – | | 1 | – | 3 | – | 1 |
| Maryland | | – | | 2 | – | 6 | – | 1 |
| Guilford | | – | | 0 | – | 3 | – | 0 |

The 1898 VMI Keydets football team represented the Virginia Military Institute (VMI) in their eighth season of organized football. Under first-year head coach Sam Boyle.

== Schedule ==
| Date | Time | Opponent | Site | Result | Attendance | Source |
|---|---|---|---|---|---|---|
| October 15 | | Columbian | Lexington, VA | W 33–0 | | |
| October 25 | | at Washington and Lee | Lexington, VA | W 29–5 | | |
| October 29 | | Richmond | Lexington, VA (rivalry) | W 16–0 | | |
| November 5 | | St. Alban's | Lexington, VA | W 22–5 | | |
| November 12 | 3:52 p.m. | vs. Georgetown | Broad Street Park; Richmond, VA | L 5–11 | 1,000 | |
| November 24 | | at Navy | Worden Field; Annapolis, MD | L 5–21 | | |
