= 1898 Columbian Orange and Blue football team =

American college football season

1898 Columbian Orange and Blue football
- Conference: Independent
- Record: 3–6
- Head coach: Graham Nichols (3rd season)

1898 Southern college football independents records
	Conf.			Overall
Team	W	L	T	W		L		T
North Carolina		–		9	–	0	–	0
Central (KY)		–		3	–	0	–	1
Oklahoma		–		2	–	0	–	0
Navy		–		7	–	1	–	0
West Virginia		–		6	–	1	–	0
Marshall		–		4	–	1	–	0
Georgetown		–		7	–	3	–	0
Texas A&M		–		4	–	2	–	0
VMI		–		4	–	2	–	0
Arkansas Industrial		–		2	–	1	–	0
Centre		–		2	–	1	–	2
VPI		–		3	–	2	–	0
Virginia		–		6	–	5	–	0
Richmond		–		3	–	3	–	1
Davidson		–		1	–	1	–	0
William & Mary		–		1	–	1	–	0
South Carolina		–		1	–	2	–	0
Delaware		–		2	–	5	–	2
Columbian		–		3	–	6	–	0
North Carolina A&M		–		1	–	2	–	0
Add-Ran		–		1	–	3	–	1
Maryland		–		2	–	6	–	1
Guilford		–		0	–	3	–	0

The 1898 Columbian Orange and Blue football team was an American football team that represented Columbian University (now known as George Washington University) as an independent during the 1898 college football season. In their third season under head coach Graham Nichols, the team compiled a 3–6 record.

== Schedule ==
Date	Time	Opponent	Site	Result	Attendance	Source
October 14		at Maryland	College Park, MD	W 17–5		
October 15		at VMI	Lexington, VA	L 0–33		
October 17		at Washington and Lee	Lexington, VA	W 11–6		
October 22		University of Maryland, Baltimore	Columbian Field; Washington, DC	L 0–5		
October 29		at Virginia	Madison Hall Field; Charlottesville, VA	L 0–47		
November 5		at Navy	Worden Field; Annapolis, MD	L 5–52		
November 12		Swarthmore	Columbian Field; Washington, DC	L 6–22		
November 16		Washington Barracks	Columbian Field; Washington, DC	W 47–0		
November 24	2:50 p.m.	at Georgetown	Georgetown Field; Washington, DC	L 5–12	4,000	
