= Harry Off =

American football player and coach

Biographical details
- Born: June 24, 1874; Philadelphia, Pennsylvania, U.S.

Playing career
- 1894–1895: Penn

Coaching career (HC unless noted)
- 1896–1897: Ursinus

Henry John Off (born June 24, 1874) was an American college football player and coach. He served as the head football coach at Ursinus College in Collegeville, Pennsylvania.
