= Level, Maryland =

Unincorporated community in Harford County, Maryland, USA

Coordinates: 39°34′49″N 76°11′36″W

- Location within the state of Maryland
- Country: United States
- State: Maryland
- County: Harford
- Time zone: UTC-5 (Eastern (EST))
  - Summer (DST): UTC-4 (EDT)
- GNIS feature ID: 590656

Level, Maryland is a small unincorporated community in Harford County, Maryland.

Level is home to a few locally-notable landmarks, such as Level Volunteer Fire Company and Hopewell Church.

A few scenes of House of Cards, a Netflix original series, were filmed in Level, Maryland.
