= J. Lewis Ingles =

American football coach (1876–1936)

Biographical details
- Born: 1876
- Died: January 2, 1936 (aged 59–60)
- Education: VPI

Playing career
- 1895–1896: Roanoke
- Position: Halfback

Coaching career (HC unless noted)
- 1897: Roanoke
- 1898: VPI

Head coaching record
- Overall: 3–2

James Lewis Ingles (1876 – January 2, 1936) was an American college football player and coach. He served as the head football coach at Virginia Agricultural and Mechanical College and Polytechnic Institute (VPI)—now known as Virginia Tech—for one season in 1898, compiling a record of 3–2. He was also an alumnus of Virginia Tech. Prior to that, he served as the head coach at Roanoke College in Salem, Virginia in 1897.

== Head coaching record ==
Year	Team	Overall	Conference	Standing	Bowl/playoffs
VPI (Southern Intercollegiate Athletic Association) (1898)
1898	VPI	3–2	0–1	T–10th	
VPI:		3–2	0–1		
Total:		3–2			
