= Jim MacRae (American football) =

American football player (1878–1957)

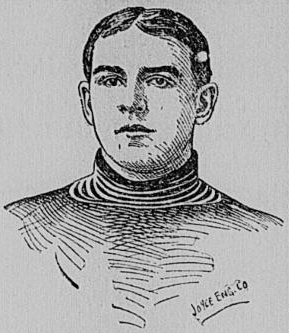
- Depiction of MacRae c. 1900

Biographical details
- Born: March 28, 1878; Fayetteville, North Carolina
- Died: February 1, 1957 (aged 78); Fayetteville, North Carolina
- Education: University of North Carolina

Playing career
- 1895–1897: Nashville
- 1898–1900: North Carolina
- Position: Halfback

Coaching career (HC unless noted)
- ?: North Carolina (assistant)

Accomplishments and honors

Championships
- SIAA (1898)

Awards
- All-Southern (1898)

James Christopher MacRae (March 28, 1878 – February 1, 1957) was a college football player and coach as well as an attorney. He was once mayor of Chapel Hill, North Carolina.

== Early years ==
He was born on March 28, 1878, in Fayetteville, North Carolina, to James Cameron MacRae, once justice of the state Supreme Court and dean of the University of North Carolina.

=== University of North Carolina ===
MacRae was a prominent running back for the North Carolina Tar Heels football team of the University of North Carolina. Dr. Joel Whitaker praised his defense.

==== 1898 ====
He was selected All-Southern in 1898. The team was undefeated Southern champion.

== Coaching career ==
He was an assistant at his alma mater.
