= Frank O. Rogers =

American football player and physician (1876–1939)

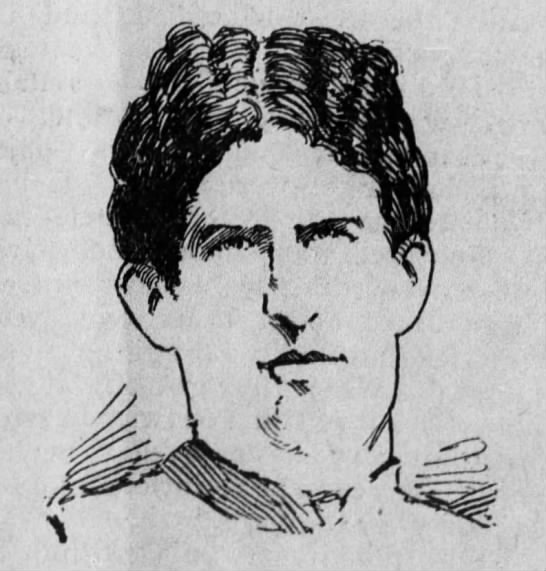
- Depiction of Rogers, c. 1898
- Born: October 21, 1876; Salisbury, North Carolina, U.S.
- Died: November 8, 1939 (aged 63); Memphis, Tennessee, U.S.
- Occupation: Physician
- Football career

Profile
- Position: Quarterback

Personal information
- Listed weight: 160 lb (73 kg)

Career information
- College: North Carolina (1896–1898)

Awards and highlights
- Southern championship (1898); All-Southern (1898)

Francis Owington "Rogers (October 21, 1876 – November 8, 1939) was an American college football player and physician.

== Early life ==
Rogers was born on October 21, 1876, in Salisbury, North Carolina, to B. F. Rogers and Mattie Harkey.

== University of North Carolina ==
Rogers was a prominent quarterback for the North Carolina Tar Heels football team of the University of North Carolina. In his freshman year he was captain of the team.

=== 1898 ===
Rogers was captain of the undefeated, Southern champion 1898 team. It is the only undefeated team in the history of UNC football. He was selected All-Southern, "and exhibited generalship of a high order."

== Physician ==
Rogers was then educated in medicine at the University of Maryland School of Medicine, receiving his M. D. in 1901. He was once a resident physician at St. Joseph's Hospital in Baltimore and then a practicing physician in Concord, North Carolina. Much later he practiced in Little Rock, Arkansas.

== Marriage ==
He married Emma Antoinette Tillar in Galveston, Texas on October 26, 1909.

== Death ==
He died in a Memphis hospital after suffering a heart attack.
