= South's Oldest Rivalry =

College football rivalry game

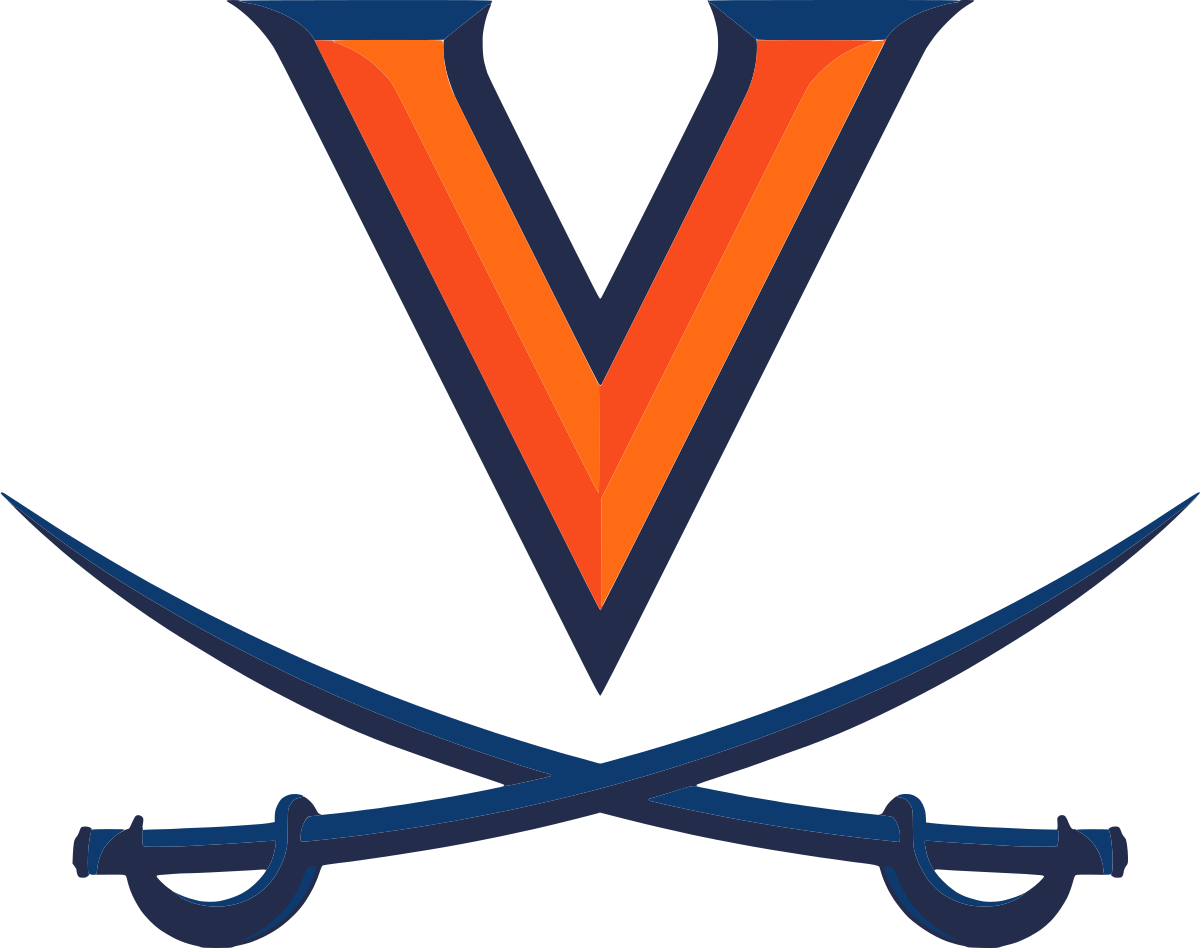
- North Carolina Tar Heels Virginia Cavaliers
- Sport: Football and Basketball
- First meeting: October 22, 1892; Virginia 30, North Carolina 18
- Latest meeting: November 21, 2026; Virginia 41, North Carolina 24
- Next meeting: 2027

Statistics
- Total meetings: 131
- All-time series: North Carolina leads, 66–61–4 (Note: In December 1956, North Carolina officials formally forfeited the 1956 game to Virginia for using an ineligible player. The UNC athletic department does not acknowledge the forfeit when reporting on the result, and chooses instead to now count the game as a UNC win, as do many other modern sources.)
- Largest victory: Virginia 66, North Carolina 0 (November 26, 1912)
- Longest win streak: North Carolina, 9 (1974–1982)
- Current win streak: Virginia, 2 (2025–present)

Locations of North Carolina and Virginia.

The South's Oldest Rivalry is the name given to the North Carolina–Virginia football rivalry (although the first rivalry football game played in the South was Wofford vs. Furman in 1889). It is an American college football rivalry game played annually by the Virginia Cavaliers football team of the University of Virginia and the North Carolina Tar Heels football team of the University of North Carolina at Chapel Hill. Both have been members of the Atlantic Coast Conference since 1953, but the Cavaliers and Tar Heels have squared off at least fifteen more times than any other two ACC football programs. Virginia and North Carolina also have extensive rivalries in several other sports.

The South's Oldest Rivalry is not actually the oldest rivalry, as the Auburn–Georgia series (Deep South's Oldest Rivalry) played its first game 245 days before the first North Carolina-Virginia matchup. But nonetheless it is so named not only because of the extraordinary age and length of the series, but because of the immense early success of both programs and the great regional importance of their earliest games: between 1889 and 1902, either Virginia or North Carolina claimed a southern championship in twelve out of fourteen years.

The preeminence of this rivalry in early southern football is demonstrated by the fact that North Carolina beat both Georgia and Auburn in their own states by the combined score of 82–0, before edging out Virginia by four points and claiming the 1898 southern championship. When Virginia had first played one of those "Deep South" teams the year prior, a Georgia fullback died in Atlanta. Virginia had the upper hand overall in the early rivalry with North Carolina, and therefore the entire region, claiming no fewer than twelve southern championships through 1908. The game was still considered a regional attraction in 1928, with a sitting President and First Lady making the eight-hour round trip from the White House to attend the sold-out rivalry game in Charlottesville on that Thanksgiving Day.

The South's Oldest Rivalry started 1–1 after playing twice in 1892 (once in Atlanta). All games played between 1893 and 1916 were at "neutral site" locations in the Commonwealth of Virginia – Richmond and Norfolk – but after a two-year hiatus for World War I, the two programs have played every year since 1919 and have alternated between their home stadiums in Chapel Hill (at Kenan Memorial Stadium since 1927) and Charlottesville (at Scott Stadium since 1931) except for two games during World War II that were played in Norfolk, VA (1943, 1944). Between 1910 and 1950, the South's Oldest Rivalry was consistently played as the last game of the season for both programs, and nearly always on Thanksgiving Day.

Virginia–Carolina is, as of 2021, tied with the Georgia–Auburn game as the second-most played rivalry game of the Power Five conferences, after the Paul Bunyan's Axe rivalry between Wisconsin and Minnesota. Among Football Bowl Subdivision rivalry games, this game is also tied with Auburn–Georgia as the most played rivalry in the South, but moreover has been played five more times than the Army–Navy Game to stand as the most-played FBS rivalry game in the East. (Note: When including FCS rivalries, the Capital Cup has been played the most times in the South and The Rivalry the most times in the East (and nation).)

== Series history ==
Long being the most played game among all Football Bowl Subdivision series in the Southeastern United States, the annual game became known over the years simply as the South's Oldest Rivalry. It is also the oldest series of the highest division on the eastern seaboard. The 2018 meeting marked the 123rd edition of this game (played continuously since 1919), five more than the Army–Navy Game for the longest FBS series in the East, but now only equal to the "Deep South's Oldest Rivalry" (Georgia–Auburn) which was recently played twice in the same year in 2017, for the longest FBS series in the South.

The game was first twice played in 1892 (Virginia won the first, and North Carolina the second, splitting the southern title). Virginia then claims a southern championship for every year of 1893–1897, with North Carolina gaining a Southern Intercollegiate Athletic Association title in 1895 (only loss to Virginia) and 1898. Both overshadowed by Sewanee in 1899, Virginia again went on a tear from 1900 until 1905 when North Carolina pulled the upset. Between 1889 and 1902, either Virginia (11) or North Carolina (2) claimed a southern championship every year except two (the aforementioned 1899 and 1891, claimed by Trinity).

Among ACC rivalries, both programs of the South's Oldest Rivalry actually played against Trinity and Wake Forest years before playing against each other. North Carolina first played (and lost to) Trinity in 1888, after also losing against Wake Forest. Virginia first played and defeated Wake Forest in 1889, and first played and defeated Trinity in 1890. Trinity, in particular, played both Carolina and Virginia annually or close to it through 1894. However, Trinity abandoned the sport of football entirely between 1895 and 1919, as Wake did likewise from 1895 through 1907. Trinity renamed itself Duke University in 1924, two years after the Blue Devils became an annual rival of the Tar Heels. Wake Forest also was an annual rival of Carolina between 1908 and 2003 (after which, ACC realignment matched them more sporadically). In contrast, Virginia did not play Duke and Wake Forest regularly again until 1951 and 1955, respectively.

The Virginia–Carolina rivalry reached its modern crescendo during the 1990s when George Welsh and Mack Brown strolled the sidelines and turned both sides of the rivalry into top ACC programs with nationally ranked teams more years than not. In the 1990–1997 period that both sides were consistently near the top of the ACC standings, Welsh and the Cavaliers won five games to Brown and the Tar Heels' three. Welsh finished 7–3 overall against Brown including two wins in 1988 and 1989 while the Tar Heels were still deep in rebuilding mode (finishing 1–10 in Brown's first two years). After building up the program, Brown left Carolina for Texas after the 1997 season. Soon after his departure, both programs seemed to enter a slow decline and Welsh retired in 2000.

In 2010, UNC broke a long losing streak in Charlottesville, UNC's first road win in the series since 1981. It ended what many UNC fans mockingly described as the "Charlottesville Curse" which lasted just short of three decades. UVA led the overall series from 1893 to 1944, but UNC has since led from 1945 onward. Virginia closed to within two games in 2009 (or a tie if including the 1956 forfeit) but UNC then proceeded to win seven games in a row (2010–2016) as the Tar Heels went undefeated in the rivalry during the entire Virginia tenure of Mike London. Despite that extended losing streak, as of 2026, Virginia is 27–16–1 in the rivalry since 1983.

== Nature of the rivalry ==
There is considerable historical lineage and academic standing between the two universities involved. The University of Virginia was founded by third President of the United States and founding father Thomas Jefferson, whereas the University of North Carolina was the first operational state university in the United States. William Faulkner was Writer-in-Residence at UVA, and Peter Taylor was on the UVA faculty and retired in Charlottesville. National Poet Laureate Rita Dove serves on the UVA faculty, and UVA is the alma mater of Edgar Allan Poe and eight winners of the Pulitzer Prize (including Edward P. Jones, Ron Suskind, Virginius Dabney, and five others). UNC is the alma mater of Thomas Wolfe (who wrote about the 1919 game in his posthumous novel The Web and the Rock), Walker Percy, and Shelby Foote. President Woodrow Wilson attended UVA and was President of its Jefferson Literary and Debating Society, whereas President James K. Polk attended UNC and was a Senator in its Dialectic and Philanthropic Societies. Assassinated Presidential candidate Robert F. Kennedy was a graduate of UVA's law school.

When the 1985 Richard Moll book was published listing the original eight "Public Ivies," public colleges with rigorous academic standards, there were only two sharing a common athletic conference: the University of Virginia and the University of North Carolina. For at least nine consecutive years, U.S. News & World Report has ranked UVA second and UNC fifth among all public universities, and they are first and second in the east. The two were also the first future members of the Atlantic Coast Conference to be elected to the prestigious Association of American Universities: UVA was elected in 1904 and UNC in 1922. Only Duke University would join them, in 1938, before the ACC was formed in 1953. They have since also been joined in the AAU by two newer ACC institutions: Georgia Tech (joined ACC in 1978; elected to AAU in 2010) and the University of Pittsburgh (elected to AAU in 1974; joined ACC in 2013).

The rivalry was often called a "Gentlemen's Rivalry," a moniker dating back to the early 20th century, and often used by the media going back to the early-mid 20th century. One reason for this moniker is the prestigious image, both academically and socially, of both universities throughout the region. The institutions' student bodies also tend to somewhat mirror one another from a social and academic standpoint.

== Contributing factors ==
=== Famous spectators ===
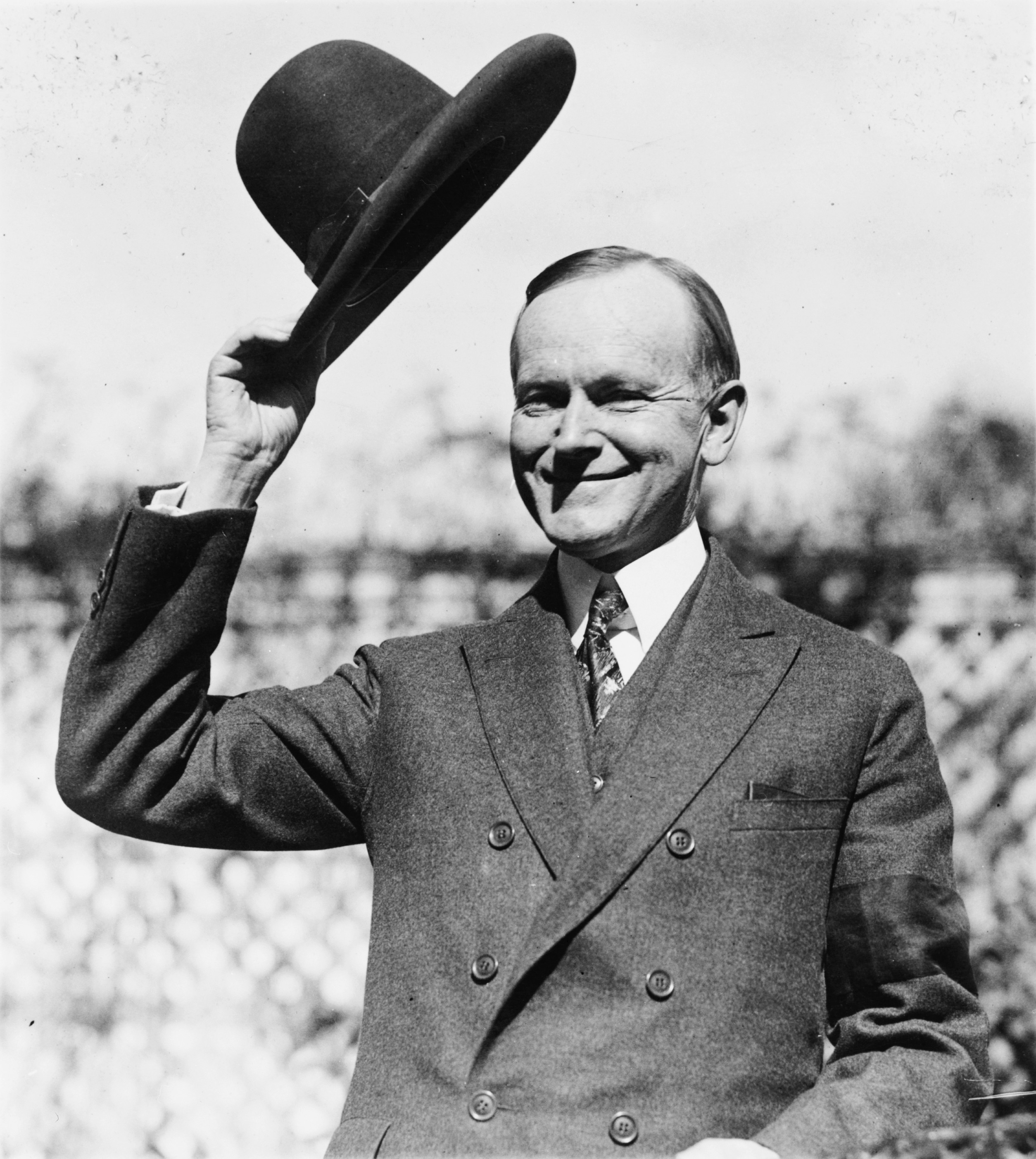
President Calvin Coolidge attended the 1928 game held on Thanksgiving Day at Lambeth Field.

Probably the most famous spectator of this rivalry was present on Thanksgiving Day in 1928. Sitting President of the United States Calvin Coolidge and First Lady Grace Anna Goodhue Coolidge were among the full capacity of 20,000 spectators to watch this rivalry game in Charlottesville. They were not graduates of either university (he had attended Amherst College and she the University of Vermont) but came purely out of interest. North Carolina won narrowly, 24–20, over Virginia in the eighth consecutive game in the series to be decided by a single touchdown or less. It was one of the last of these rivalry games played at Lambeth Field, as Scott Stadium was constructed in 1931 to accommodate more spectators. Coolidge had declined to run for a second term, and just sixteen days before the game Coolidge's Secretary of Commerce, Herbert Hoover, had won the 1928 presidential election to replace him.

=== "Benedict Ronald" ===
Often considered the best high school football player of all time from the state of Virginia, and the only junior ever to be named the nation's top high school quarterback by USA Today, Ronald Curry announced a verbal commitment to George Welsh's Virginia program on September 4, 1997, during ESPN coverage of that night's game between Virginia and Auburn. With the commitment from Curry, Welsh declined to recruit Michael Vick, whose own stellar career in the same high school district was largely overshadowed by Curry's. While Curry's high school football coach, 12-time state champion Mike Smith, was happy that Curry would attend Virginia, Curry's AAU basketball coach Boo Williams told Curry he should decommit and go to a "basketball school" like North Carolina to get a better shot at the NBA.

Curry decommitted from Virginia on signing day, causing him to be called "Benedict Ronald" and "Benedict Curry" by the Virginia faithful who blamed him not only for the program losing out on his own services, but for losing out on the unrecruited Vick. Curry was lampooned in the media, earning the title "Sports Jerk of the Year" in the nationally syndicated Tank McNamara comic strip.

At North Carolina, Curry did not become the dominant college football player that many had expected him to be but still set UNC records including most career passing yards and most career total yards. Curry played basketball for two seasons at UNC and started at point guard.

He was drafted by the Oakland Raiders and played seven years in the NFL after converting to wide receiver. As of 2019, he is in his fourth year as the wide receivers coach for the New Orleans Saints.

== Game results ==
North Carolina victories	Virginia victories	Tie games	Forfeits

No.	Date	Location	Winner	Score
1	October 22, 1892	Charlottesville, VA	Virginia	30–18
2	November 26, 1892	Atlanta, GA	North Carolina	26–0
3	November 30, 1893	Richmond, VA	Virginia	16–0
4	November 29, 1894	Richmond, VA	Virginia	34–0
5	November 28, 1895	Richmond, VA	Virginia	6–0
6	November 26, 1896	Richmond, VA	Virginia	46–0
7	November 25, 1897	Richmond, VA	Virginia	12–0
8	November 24, 1898	Richmond, VA	North Carolina	6–2
9	November 24, 1900	Norfolk, VA	Virginia	17–0
10	November 23, 1901	Norfolk, VA	Virginia	23–6
11	November 27, 1902	Richmond, VA	Tie	12–12
12	November 25, 1903	Richmond, VA	North Carolina	16–0
13	November 24, 1904	Richmond, VA	Virginia	12–11
14	November 30, 1905	Norfolk, VA	North Carolina	17–0
15	October 26, 1907	Richmond, VA	Virginia	9–4
16	November 26, 1908	Richmond, VA	Virginia	31–0
17	November 24, 1910	Richmond, VA	Virginia	7–0
18	November 30, 1911	Richmond, VA	Virginia	28–0
19	November 26, 1912	Richmond, VA	Virginia	66–0
20	November 27, 1913	Richmond, VA	Virginia	26–7
21	November 26, 1914	Richmond, VA	Virginia	20–3
22	November 25, 1915	Richmond, VA	Virginia	14–0
23	November 30, 1916	Richmond, VA	North Carolina	7–0
24	November 27, 1919	Chapel Hill, NC	North Carolina	6–0
25	November 25, 1920	Charlottesville, VA	Virginia	14–0
26	November 24, 1921	Chapel Hill, NC	North Carolina	7–3
27	November 30, 1922	Charlottesville, VA	North Carolina	10–7
28	November 29, 1923	Chapel Hill, NC	Tie	0–0
29	November 27, 1924	Charlottesville, VA	Virginia	7–0
30	November 26, 1925	Chapel Hill, NC	Tie	3–3
31	November 23, 1926	Charlottesville, VA	Virginia	3–0
32	November 24, 1927	Chapel Hill, NC	North Carolina	14–13
33	November 29, 1928	Charlottesville, VA	North Carolina	24–20
34	November 28, 1929	Chapel Hill, NC	North Carolina	41–7
35	November 27, 1930	Charlottesville, VA	North Carolina	41–0
36	November 26, 1931	Chapel Hill, NC	North Carolina	13–6
37	November 24, 1932	Charlottesville, VA	Virginia	14–7
38	November 30, 1933	Chapel Hill, NC	North Carolina	14–0
39	November 24, 1934	Charlottesville, VA	North Carolina	25–6
40	November 28, 1935	Chapel Hill, NC	North Carolina	61–0
41	November 26, 1936	Charlottesville, VA	North Carolina	59–14
42	November 27, 1937	Chapel Hill, NC	No. 18 North Carolina	40–0
43	November 24, 1938	Charlottesville, VA	North Carolina	20–0
44	November 30, 1939	Chapel Hill, NC	No. 16 North Carolina	19–0
45	November 23, 1940	Charlottesville, VA	North Carolina	10–7
46	November 20, 1941	Chapel Hill, NC	Virginia	28–7
47	November 21, 1942	Charlottesville, VA	North Carolina	28–13
48	November 27, 1943	Norfolk, VA	North Carolina	54–7
49	December 2, 1944	Norfolk, VA	Virginia	26–7
50	December 1, 1945	Chapel Hill, NC	North Carolina	27–18
51	November 30, 1946	Charlottesville, VA	No. 11 North Carolina	49–14
52	November 29, 1947	Chapel Hill, NC	No. 10 North Carolina	40–7
53	November 27, 1948	Charlottesville, VA	No. 4 North Carolina	34–12
54	November 26, 1949	Chapel Hill, NC	No. 19 North Carolina	14–7
55	December 2, 1950	Charlottesville, VA	Virginia	44–13
56	November 10, 1951	Charlottesville, VA	Virginia	34–14
57	November 8, 1952	Chapel Hill, NC	Virginia	34–7
58	November 21, 1953	Charlottesville, VA	North Carolina	33–7
59	November 20, 1954	Charlottesville, VA	North Carolina	26–14
60	November 19, 1955	Chapel Hill, NC	North Carolina	26–14
61	November 10, 1956 ^{*}	Charlottesville, VA	North Carolina	21–7
62	November 30, 1957	Chapel Hill, NC	Virginia	20–13
63	November 8, 1958	Charlottesville, VA	No. 15 North Carolina	42–0
64	November 14, 1959	Chapel Hill, NC	North Carolina	41–0
65	November 26, 1960	Charlottesville, VA	North Carolina	35–8
66	December 2, 1961	Chapel Hill, NC	North Carolina	24–0

No.	Date	Location	Winner	Score
67	November 10, 1962	Charlottesville, VA	North Carolina	11–7
68	September 21, 1963	Chapel Hill, NC	North Carolina	11–7
69	November 14, 1964	Charlottesville, VA	Virginia	31–27
70	October 2, 1965	Chapel Hill, NC	Virginia	21–17
71	November 26, 1966	Chapel Hill, NC	Virginia	21–14
72	November 11, 1967	Charlottesville, VA	Virginia	40–17
73	November 9, 1968	Chapel Hill, NC	Virginia	41–6
74	November 1, 1969	Charlottesville, VA	North Carolina	12–0
75	October 31, 1970	Chapel Hill, NC	North Carolina	30–15
76	November 13, 1971	Charlottesville, VA	North Carolina	32–20
77	November 11, 1972	Chapel Hill, NC	No. 18 North Carolina	23–3
78	November 3, 1973	Charlottesville, VA	Virginia	44–40
79	November 2, 1974	Chapel Hill, NC	North Carolina	24–10
80	October 4, 1975	Charlottesville, VA	North Carolina	31–28
81	November 13, 1976	Chapel Hill, NC	North Carolina	31–6
82	November 12, 1977	Charlottesville, VA	No. 19 North Carolina	35–14
83	November 18, 1978	Chapel Hill, NC	North Carolina	38–20
84	November 17, 1979	Charlottesville, VA	North Carolina	13–7
85	November 15, 1980	Chapel Hill, NC	No. 15 North Carolina	26–3
86	November 14, 1981	Charlottesville, VA	No. 13 North Carolina	17–14
87	November 13, 1982	Chapel Hill, NC	North Carolina	27–14
88	November 12, 1983	Charlottesville, VA	Virginia	17–14
89	November 17, 1984	Chapel Hill, NC	Tie	24–24
90	November 16, 1985	Charlottesville, VA	Virginia	24–22
91	November 15, 1986	Chapel Hill, NC	North Carolina	27–7
92	November 14, 1987	Charlottesville, VA	Virginia	20–17
93	November 12, 1988	Chapel Hill, NC	Virginia	27–24
94	October 14, 1989	Charlottesville, VA	Virginia	50–17
95	November 10, 1990	Chapel Hill, NC	No. 11 Virginia	24–10
96	October 19, 1991	Charlottesville, VA	Virginia	14–9
97	October 17, 1992	Chapel Hill, NC	North Carolina	27–7
98	October 23, 1993	Charlottesville, VA	No. 21 Virginia	17–10
99	October 22, 1994	Charlottesville, VA	No. 25 Virginia	34–10
100	October 7, 1995	Chapel Hill, NC	North Carolina	22–17
101	November 16, 1996	Charlottesville, VA	No. 24 Virginia	20–17
102	September 27, 1997	Chapel Hill, NC	No. 5 North Carolina	48–20
103	November 14, 1998	Charlottesville, VA	No. 21 Virginia	30–13
104	September 4, 1999	Chapel Hill, NC	No. 23 Virginia	20–17
105	October 28, 2000	Charlottesville, VA	Virginia	17–6
106	October 13, 2001	Chapel Hill, NC	North Carolina	30–24
107	October 19, 2002	Charlottesville, VA	Virginia	37–27
108	October 4, 2003	Chapel Hill, NC	Virginia	38–13
109	September 11, 2004	Charlottesville, VA	No. 15 Virginia	56–24
110	October 22, 2005	Chapel Hill, NC	North Carolina	7–5
111	October 19, 2006	Charlottesville, VA	Virginia	23–0
112	September 15, 2007	Chapel Hill, NC	Virginia	22–20
113	October 18, 2008	Charlottesville, VA	Virginia	16–13
114	October 3, 2009	Chapel Hill, NC	Virginia	16–3
115	October 16, 2010	Charlottesville, VA	North Carolina	44–10
116	September 17, 2011	Chapel Hill, NC	North Carolina	28–17
117	November 15, 2012	Charlottesville, VA	North Carolina	37–13
118	November 9, 2013	Chapel Hill, NC	North Carolina	45–14
119	October 25, 2014	Charlottesville, VA	North Carolina	28–27
120	October 24, 2015	Chapel Hill, NC	No. 22 North Carolina	26–13
121	October 22, 2016	Charlottesville, VA	North Carolina	35–14
122	October 14, 2017	Chapel Hill, NC	Virginia	20–14
123	October 27, 2018	Charlottesville, VA	Virginia	31–21
124	November 2, 2019	Chapel Hill, NC	Virginia	38–31
125	October 31, 2020	Charlottesville, VA	Virginia	44–41
126	September 18, 2021	Chapel Hill, NC	No. 21 North Carolina	59–39
127	November 5, 2022	Charlottesville, VA	No. 17 North Carolina	31–28
128	October 21, 2023	Chapel Hill, NC	Virginia	31–27
129	October 26, 2024	Charlottesville, VA	North Carolina	41–14
130	October 25, 2025	Chapel Hill, NC	No. 16 Virginia	17–16
131	November 21, 2026	Charlottesville, VA	Virginia	41–24
Series: North Carolina leads 66–61–4

^{^*}In 1956, North Carolina forfeited this game due to using an ineligible player. However, UNC and various other sources today count the game as a win.

== Other sports ==
Virginia and North Carolina have won NCAA Championships in numerous sports other than football. In three particular men's sports they have established heated rivalries, and in each of these sports both sides have won one or more NCAA Championships. As of October 2019, a total of 28 national titles have been won between these two rivals in men's basketball, men's lacrosse, and men's soccer. Moreover, all six programs of the rivalries below have had great success not only historically but also recently: every program involved has won at least one NCAA Championship in the 2010s.

=== Men's basketball ===
Both North Carolina and Virginia have NCAA Championship programs in men's basketball. Carolina's Hubert Davis holds a 3–2 edge against UVA's Tony Bennett as of 2023. Carolina leads the overall series 131–57 as of the same date. Carolina has won seven national championships—six NCAA Championships (1957, 1982, 1993, 2005, 2009, 2017) and one national championship that predates the NCAA (1924). Virginia has won one NCAA Championship (2019), for a total of eight national titles between the two programs. Carolina defeated Virginia in the Championship Game of the 2016 ACC tournament, and went on to win the 2017 NCAA tournament the following year. Returning the favor, Virginia defeated Carolina in the Championship Game of the 2018 ACC tournament, and went on to win the 2019 NCAA tournament the following year.

=== Men's lacrosse ===
Both Virginia and North Carolina have NCAA Championship programs in men's lacrosse. Virginia leads the overall series 30–21 as of 2020. Virginia has won seven NCAA Championships (1972, 1999, 2003, 2006, 2011, 2019, 2021) and Carolina has won five NCAA Championships (1981, 1982, 1986, 1991, 2016). Virginia also has two national championships (1952, 1970) which predate NCAA oversight, for a total of fourteen national titles between the two programs.

=== Men's soccer ===
Both Virginia and North Carolina have NCAA Championship programs in men's soccer. As of 2019, North Carolina leads Virginia 40–36–10 across all men's soccer competitions. However, Virginia has won seven NCAA Championships (1989, 1991, 1992, 1993, 1994, 2009, and 2014) while North Carolina has won two NCAA Championships (2001, 2011) for a total of nine national titles between the two programs.

== See also ==
- List of NCAA college football rivalry games
- List of most-played college football series in NCAA Division I

== Notes ==
^{1}Virginia won the first game played in 1892.
^{2}North Carolina won the second game played in 1892.
