= Louis Graves =

American journalist, editor, and football player (1883–1965)

- Born: April 6, 1883; Chapel Hill, North Carolina
- Died: January 23, 1965 (aged 81)
- Occupation: Newspaper editor
- Football career

North Carolina Tar Heels
- Position: Quarterback/Fullback

Career information
- College: North Carolina (1898–1902)

Awards and highlights
- All-Southern (1902); SIAA champion (1898)

Louis Graves (April 6, 1883 – January 23, 1965) was an American journalist and editor who founded the Chapel Hill Weekly. He played college football at the University of North Carolina at Chapel Hill as a running back. He wrote essays for the Baltimore Sun.
