= Western Pennsylvania Professional Football Circuit =

Defunct American football league in the United States

The Western Pennsylvania Professional Football Circuit was a loose association of American football clubs that operated from 1890 to approximately 1940. Originally amateur, professionalism was introduced to the circuit in 1892; cost pressures pushed the circuit to semi-professional status from about 1920 through the rest of its existence. Existing in some form for 48 years, it was one of the longest-lived paying football loops to operate outside the auspices of the National Football League.

The football clubs of the 1880s and 1890s were amateur teams. They were under the membership of an athletic club, which provided both sports and the ability to wager money on the sports. However, the prestige and increased membership that could come from a successful team, led these clubs to begin secretly hiring talented players. The amateur athletics that these clubs engaged in were policed by the Amateur Athletic Union (AAU). By the mid-1890s allegations of professionalism became known to the AAU. The Allegheny Athletic Association was found guilty of paying cash to players and was permanently barred from any kind of competition with other AAU members. This punishment would end a team, because their opponents, whether other pros, amateur associations, or colleges, would have simply stopped playing them. Allegheny then defied the AAU in 1896 and created an entirely open professional team. A year later, the Latrobe Athletic Association, went entirely professional. The misconception that these were amateur athletic clubs was held to in public, even when newspapers wrote openly of players being under contract. To get around this, the circuit teams played for local or regional championships, with the only generally recognized national champion being the best college football team. However, the winner of the circuit was usually able to lay claim to a national, but professional, football title from 1890-1903.

By 1904, the exodus of pro football talent to the "Ohio League", diminished the region's level of play and the national professional champions, were usually then claimed by the teams from Ohio. Though a champion was declared by the media, fans and clubs throughout this period, a formal league was not founded until 1920, when several teams from the "Ohio League" and the New York Pro Football League formed the American Professional Football Association. In 1922 the APFA became the National Football League.

The circuit did not immediately die out and in fact experienced a slight renaissance in the 1920s as the Western Pennsylvania Senior Independent Football Conference. 1920s era blue laws in the state of Pennsylvania meant that while the NFL played its games on Sunday, Pennsylvania teams would have to play on Saturday; while this prevented the state's teams from joining the NFL until 1924, Pennsylvania teams could thus schedule exhibition games against NFL teams on either one's day off (other circuits such as the eastern Pennsylvania circuit and the Eastern/Anthracite Leagues also thrived in the 1920s) The J.P. Rooneys were founded in 1921; it later joined the NFL in 1933 as the Pittsburgh Pirates (now the Pittsburgh Steelers). Records of the Pirates playing other Western Pennsylvania teams (including the McKeesport Olympics) continue up to at least 1940, after which point most teams dissolved due to World War II; the Pirates (by now renamed the Steelers) then shifted its exhibition schedule to other minor league teams.

== Circuit "championships" ==
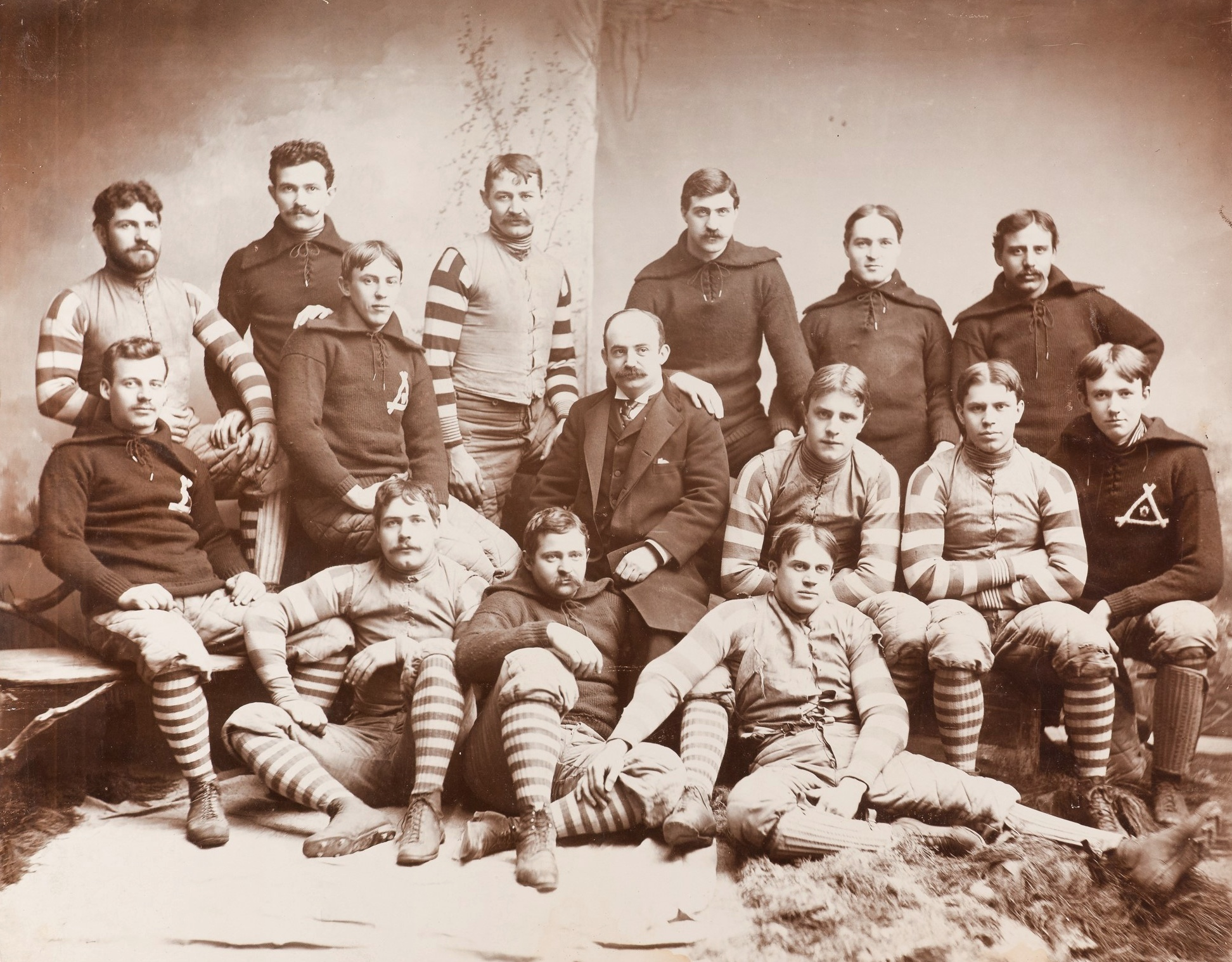
1893 Pittsburgh Athletic Club

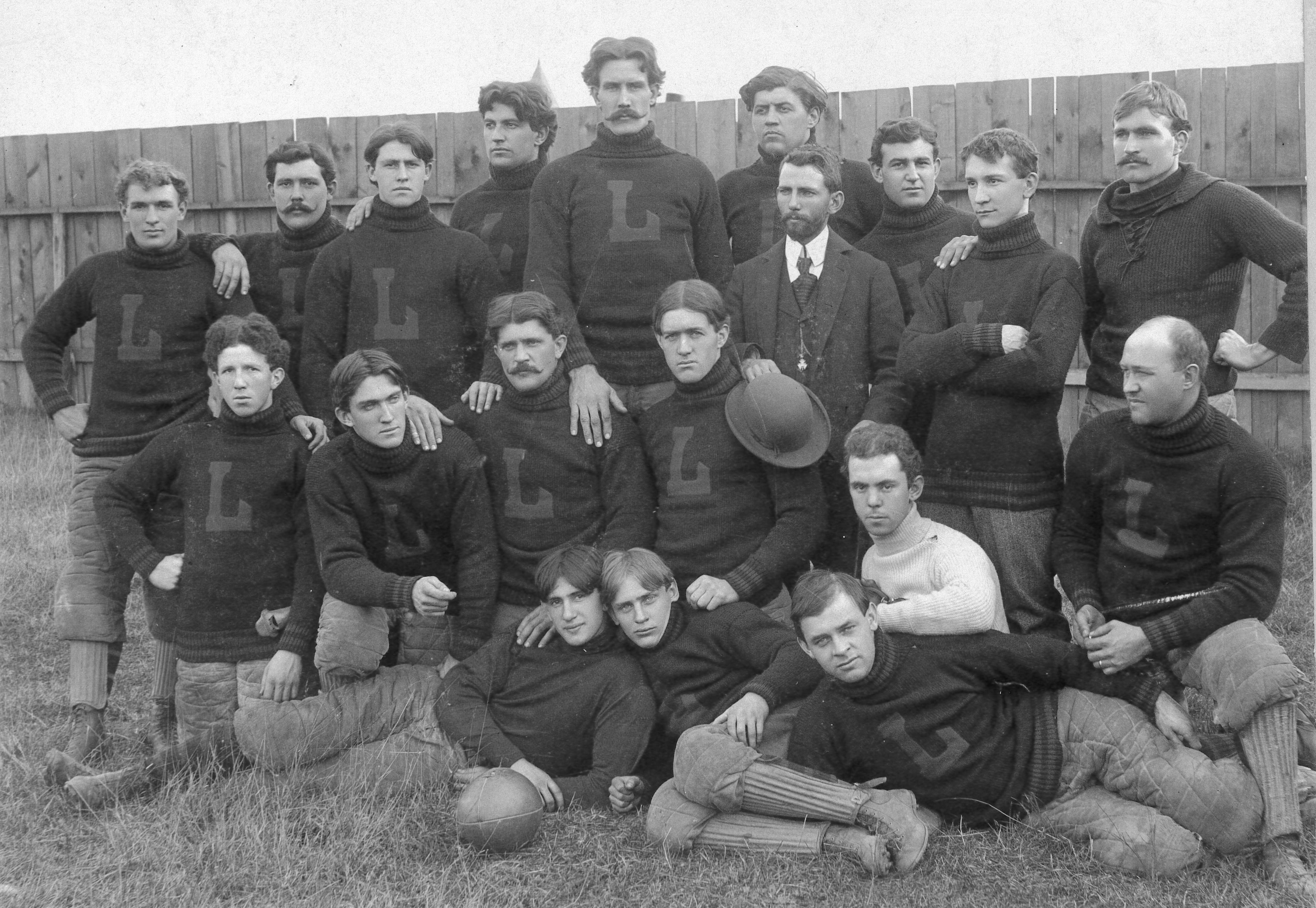
Latrobe Athletic Association football team in 1897, the first team to go fully professional for an entire season.

Year	Champion	W	L	T	Deciding game
1890	Allegheny Athletic Association	3	2	1	
1891	Pittsburgh Athletic Club	7	0	0	
1892	Allegheny Athletic Association	3	1	2	def. Pittsburgh Athletic Club, 4-0; First professional football game November 12, 1892
1893	Inconclusive				
1894	Allegheny Athletic Association	6	2	0	def. Pittsburgh Athletic Club, 30-4
1895	Duquesne Country and A . C .	4	3	1	def. Pittsburgh Athletic Club, 10-6
1896	Allegheny Athletic Association; First fully professional football team				def. Pittsburgh Athletic Club, 18-0
1897	Greensburg Athletic Association	10	1	0	def. Latrobe Athletic Association, 6-0
1898	Duquesne Country and A. C.	9	0	1	def. Western Pennsylvania All-Stars, 16-0; First all-star game in pro football
1899	Duquesne Country and A. C.	10	0	0	
1900	Homestead Library & A. C.	10	0	0	
1901	Homestead Library & A. C.	11	0	0	def. Philadelphia Athletic Club, 6-5
1902	Pittsburgh Stars; First National Football League	9	2	1	def. Philadelphia Athletics, 11-0; Title disputed by the Athletics
1903	Latrobe Athletic Association & Franklin Athletic Club	9	0	0	def. Pennsylvania Railroad YMCA, 6-0 def. East End A. A., 23-0 Franklin claimed the "US Pro Football Title" and refused to play Latrobe. Franklin won the 1903 World Series of Football
1904	Latrobe Athletic Association	9	0	0	def. Steelton Athletic Club, 5-0
1905	Latrobe Athletic Association	8	0	0	def. Canton Athletic Club, 6-0

== Other circuit teams ==
- Erie Veterans
- Glassport Odds
- Jeannette Athletic Club
- J.P. Rooneys (a.k.a. "Hope-Harveys" and "Majestic Radios")
- McKeesport Olympics
- Oil City Athletic Club
- Pitcairn Quakers
- Pittsburgh Lyceum
- Warslow Athletic Club

== Historic professional football firsts ==
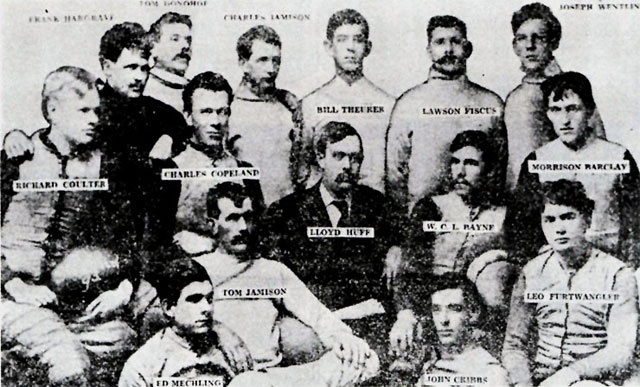
1893 Greensburg Athletic Association team.

Several of the teams and individuals, in the circuit, pioneered several historic firsts for professional football. These accomplishments include:

- William "Pudge" Heffelfinger (Allegheny Athletic Association) became the first known professional football player on November 12, 1892.
- Sport Donnelly (Allegheny Athletic Association) became the first known professional football coach in 1893.
- A player assumed to be Grant Dibert (Pittsburgh Athletic Club) signed the first known pro football contract, which covered all of the club's games for the 1893 season.
- John Brallier (Latrobe Athletic Association) became the first openly professional football player on September 3, 1895
- Allegheny Athletic Association fielded the first entirely openly professional team in 1896.
- Latrobe Athletic Association became the first football team to play a full season with only professionals in 1897.
- William Chase Temple (Duquesne Country and Athletic Club) became the first individual owner of a professional football team in c.1898.
- The first ever professional football all-star game held between the Duquesne Country and Athletic Club and players from Western Pennsylvania All-Stars.
- Adam Martin Wyant (Greensburg Athletic Club) was the first professional football player to get elected to the United States Congress in 1921.

=== First known professional players ===
- William "Pudge" Heffelfinger – Allegheny Athletic Association – $500 for one game on November 12, 1892.
- Ben "Sport" Donnelly – Allegheny Athletic Association – $250 for one game on November 19, 1892.
- Peter Wright – Allegheny Athletic Association – $50 per game (under contract) for the entire 1893 season.
- John Van Cleve – Allegheny Athletic Association – $50 per game (under contract) for the entire 1893 season.
- Ollie Rafferty – Allegheny Athletic Association – $50 per game (under contract) for the entire 1893 season.
- Unknown player (assumed to be Grant Dibert) – Pittsburgh Athletic Club – for the entire 1893 season.
- Lawson Fiscus – Greenburg Athletic Association – $20 per game (under contract) for the entire 1894 season.
- John Brallier – Latrobe Athletic Association – $10 and expenses for one game on September 3, 1895.

== Notes ==
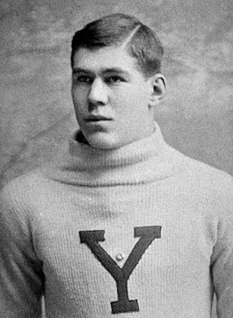
Allegheny's William "Pudge" Heffelfinger, the first professional football player

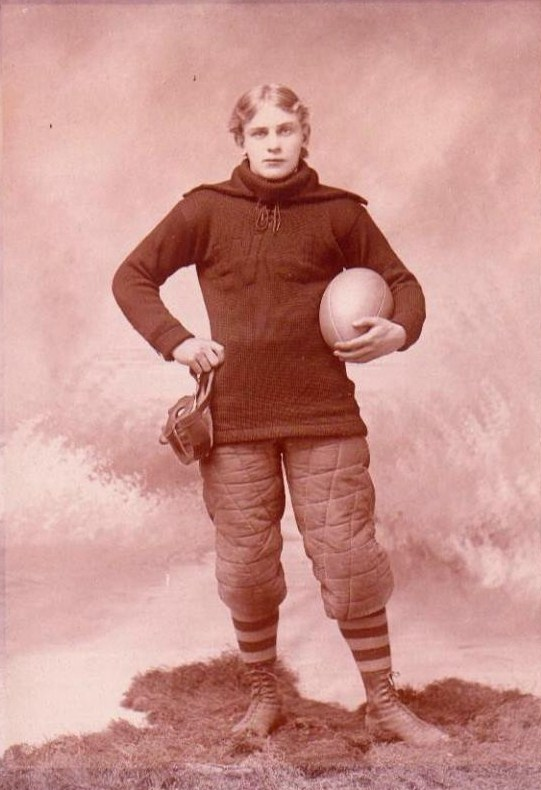
Latrobe's John Brallier, the first admitted professional football player.

== See also ==
- American football in Western Pennsylvania
- History of American football
