= 1894 Allegheny Athletic Association football season =

American football team season

1894 Allegheny Athletic Association football
- Record: 6–2
- Manager: Bill Kountz
- Captain: Anson Harrold
- Home field: AAA Park; Exposition Park

The Allegheny Athletic Association played its fifth season of American football in 1894. Under manager Bill Kountz and captain Anson Harrold, the team compiled a record of 6–2 and won the local Pittsburgh-area championship – along with a trophy cup donated by the Pittsburgh Chronicle Telegraph – by beating the Pittsburgh Athletic Club in two out of three games.

== Schedule ==
Date	Opponent	Site	Result	Source
October 6	Sewickley Athletic Club	AAA Park; Allegheny, PA	W 18–0	
October 13	Indiana (PA) Normal	AAA Park; Allegheny, PA	W 16–0	
October 20	Carnegie Athletic Club (Braddock, PA)	AAA Park; Allegheny, PA	W 33–0	
October 27	at Pittsburgh Athletic Club	PAC Park; Pittsburgh, PA	L 4–6	
November 6	Pittsburgh Athletic Club	Exposition Park; Allegheny, PA	W 6–0	
November 10	at Altoona Cricket Club	Cricket grounds; Altoona, PA	W 20–4	
November 17	Chicago Athletic Association	Exposition Park; Allegheny, PA	L 0–24	
November 24	Pittsburgh Athletic Club	Exposition Park; Allegheny, PA	W 30–4	

== Roster ==
The Pittsburgh Chronicle Telegraph listed the following team members on October 27:

- Charles Bemies – center
- J. Dodds – sub
- Ben "Sport" Donnelley – tackle
- Ross Fiscus – halfback
- W. M. Greenwood – guard
- Anson Harrold (captain) – tackle
- J. Hart – guard
- G. C. Hutchinson – fullback
- Louis Marchand – sub tackle
- Albert A. Marshall – sub end
- Sandy McGregor – end
- Gil Rafferty – guard
- Ollie Rafferty – halfback
- M. P. Randolph – end
- Reuben Rose – sub guard
- H. M. Southgate – halfback
- Neville Staughton – guard
- William Sterrett – sub
- A. S. Valentine – quarterback
- John Van Cleve – end

Also appearing during the season were center Archibald Stevenson, controversially imported from the Chicago Athletic Association for Allegheny's last game against the Pittsburgh Athletic Club, and 39-year-old veteran O. D. Thompson, used at left end in the Indiana Normal game.
