= 1893 Allegheny Athletic Association football season =

American football team season

1893 Allegheny Athletic Association football
- Record: 4–3
- Manager: O. D. Thompson
- Head coach: Sport Donnelly
- Captain: Ollie Rafferty
- Home field: AAA Park

The Allegheny Athletic Association played its fourth season of American football in 1893. Managed by O. D. Thompson and coached by Ben "Sport" Donnelly, the team compiled a record of 4–3.

The team signed Peter Wright, John Van Cleve, and Ollie Rafferty to season-long contracts promising them $50 per game, making them the third, fourth, and fifth players (after Pudge Heffelfinger and Donnelly) known to have been paid to play football.

== Schedule ==
Date	Opponent	Site	Result	Source
October 14	Western University of Pennsylvania	AAA Park; Allegheny, PA	L 0–4	
October 21	Columbia Athletic Club (Washington, DC)	AAA Park; Allegheny, PA	W 28–0	
October 28	Cleveland Athletic Club	AAA Park; Allegheny, PA	W 28–0	
November 4	Chicago Athletic Association	AAA Park; Allegheny, PA	L 0–4	
November 7	Pittsburgh Athletic Club	AAA Park; Allegheny, PA	L 0–6	
November 11	Detroit Athletic Club	AAA Park; Allegheny, PA	W 18–0	
November 18	at Pittsburgh Athletic Club	PAC Park; Pittsburgh, PA	W 8–4	
