= Joe Trees =

American football player (1869–1943)

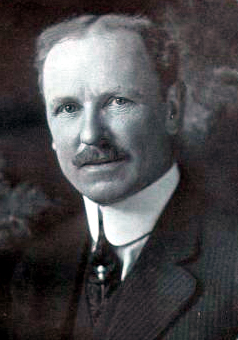
- Joseph C. Trees, "a true Pitt man" according to the 1915 The Owl student yearbook.

Profile
- Positions: Tackle, Center

Personal information
- Born: November 10, 1869; Delmont, Pennsylvania
- Died: May 19, 1943 (aged 73); Pittsburgh, Pennsylvania
- Listed weight: 210 lb (95 kg)

Career information
- College: Pitt

Career history
- Allegheny Athletic Association (1892–1893); Pittsburgh Athletic Club (1894)

Joseph Clifton Trees (November 10, 1869 – May 19, 1943) was a college football player at the University of Pittsburgh, the first athlete to receive an athletic subsidization at the school, and, possibly, an early professional football player. He later made millions of dollars in the oil industry and became a trustee and significant benefactor to the university and its athletic department. His hobbies included philanthropy, scientific research and agriculture. His 2,600-acre (11 km^{2}) estate in Gibsonia, Pennsylvania was devoted to a large extent to fruit trees.

== Early life ==
Trees was born near Delmont, Pennsylvania in Westmoreland County, where his grandfather, Thomas Trees, had established a flour mill and a sawmill after immigrating from England. His parents, Isaac and Lucy Johnston Trees, later operated the mills and, as a youth, Joe worked in them.

== College football ==
Trees first attended Indiana Normal School (now Indiana University of Pennsylvania). While playing in practice games against the Western University of Pennsylvania (WUP), now named the University of Pittsburgh, Trees impressed Bert Smyers, the founder and captain of the WUP football team. In order to facilitate Trees to switch schools and play football for WUP, Smyers helped to arrange for various classes at the university to pay for Trees' room, board, and tuition. Thus in 1891, Trees became Pitt's first subsidized athlete as a star 210 pound tackle on Pitt's football team.

Trees graduated from the university with a degree in mechanical engineering in 1895. Trees, also participated in the universities track and field team, and in 1894, additionally served as an Assistant Librarian at the university.

== Possible professional football career ==
In 1892 and 1893, Trees played football on the side for the then-amateur Allegheny Athletic Association. The club in 1893 was suspected heavily of secretly paying its players, making them professionals. Documents discovered a half-century later showed that on November 21, 1892, Pudge Heffelfinger, an all-American guard from Yale, was paid $500 (US dollars) to play for Allegheny against the rival Pittsburgh Athletic Club. It is unknown if Trees was paid by Allegheny to play football with the club.

In 1894, Trees jumped to the Pittsburgh Athletic Club. That year, during a game against Allegheny, quarterback A. S. Valentine was thrown out of the game after coming to the aid of John Van Cleve during a fight against Trees. After several appeals, Valentine left the field reportedly "crying like a baby" by the local media. During a second game that season, Trees was thrown out of the game for punching Allegheny's Sport Donnelly. Trees never liked Donnelly; during games when the two lined up against each other, Donnelly would pull Trees' long-flowing hair. Joe would usually defend himself with a strenuous poke at Donnelly, and often ended up on the sideline as in this game.

== Family ==
Trees married Claudine Willison on November 22, 1894. The couple had two sons, both of whom were killed: Joseph Graham Trees as an aviator during World War I and the other, Merle, died at age 10 in a traffic accident in Pittsburgh. After the death of his wife, Joe married, in 1929, his secretary, the former Edith Lehm. The couple had a son, Joe Benedum Trees.

== Oil industry ==
During his summer vacations from college Joe worked for Standard Oil. He and his partner Mike Benedum, decided to buy a lease in Pleasants County, West Virginia, and this was the start of their career together. Their first well came in 1896 and six more soon gushed from the same lease. Benedum and Trees developed a dozen other rich pools in West Virginia with varying success up to 1900. Superstition played a big part in their decisions of where to drill. In one instance, a blind farmer once told them he had envisioned oil gushing out of a hill on his farm and shooting up over a tree. Trees and Benedum then decided to drill on that spot. As a result, a well gushed just as the blind man had dreamed. Another time the two men heard of a natural rock-formation arrow which legend said pointed to treasure. Benedum sighted along the arrow while Trees moved back and forth in a straight line from it. They drilled the chosen spot and again struck oil.

Over the years, the men developed oil fields for Marie of Romania in Ploiești. Those fields were taken over by Nazi Germany during World War II and became a target of the war's oil campaign, such as Operation Tidal Wave. Ploieşti was captured by Soviet troops in August 1944. Trees and Benedum also founded wells in Illinois, West Texas, Florida (with Clem S. Clarke of Shreveport, Louisiana), Mexico, Colombia, and throughout South America. Their West Texas discoveries were among the most significant in his career. Untouched and despised by other oil men, this area has since poured out a billion barrels, with reserves estimated at another billion.

On May 19, 1943 while talking to his partner Mike Benedum in their company headquarters at the Benedum-Trees Building, Trees suddenly slumped forward in his chair and died of a heart attack.

== Legacy ==
Trees remained closely tied to his alma mater throughout his life. He served on and, for a time, became president of University of Pittsburgh's Board of Trustees. An important benefactor for the University of Pittsburgh and its athletic department, in 1912 he donated $100,000 for the construction of the original Trees Gymnasium and Trees Stadium/Field that sat near the site of the present day Veterans Administration Hospital in Oakland. Today, a short distance from those now demolished original structures, two university facilities bear his name: Trees Field and Trees Hall, a multipurpose recreation and varsity athletics facility that opened in 1962. Trees also donated funds to the Pitt Band, $75,000 to the construction of Eberly Hall, and purchased $200,000 worth of bonds to help pay for the construction of Pitt Stadium. Until his death, his generosity to the university earned him the reputation as "a true Pitt man" and "Call on Joe" became a byword when the university was in need.

== See also ==
- Trees Hall
- Texon, Texas
