= Billy Kountz =

American businessman and football player (1867–1899)

William J. Kountz Jr.
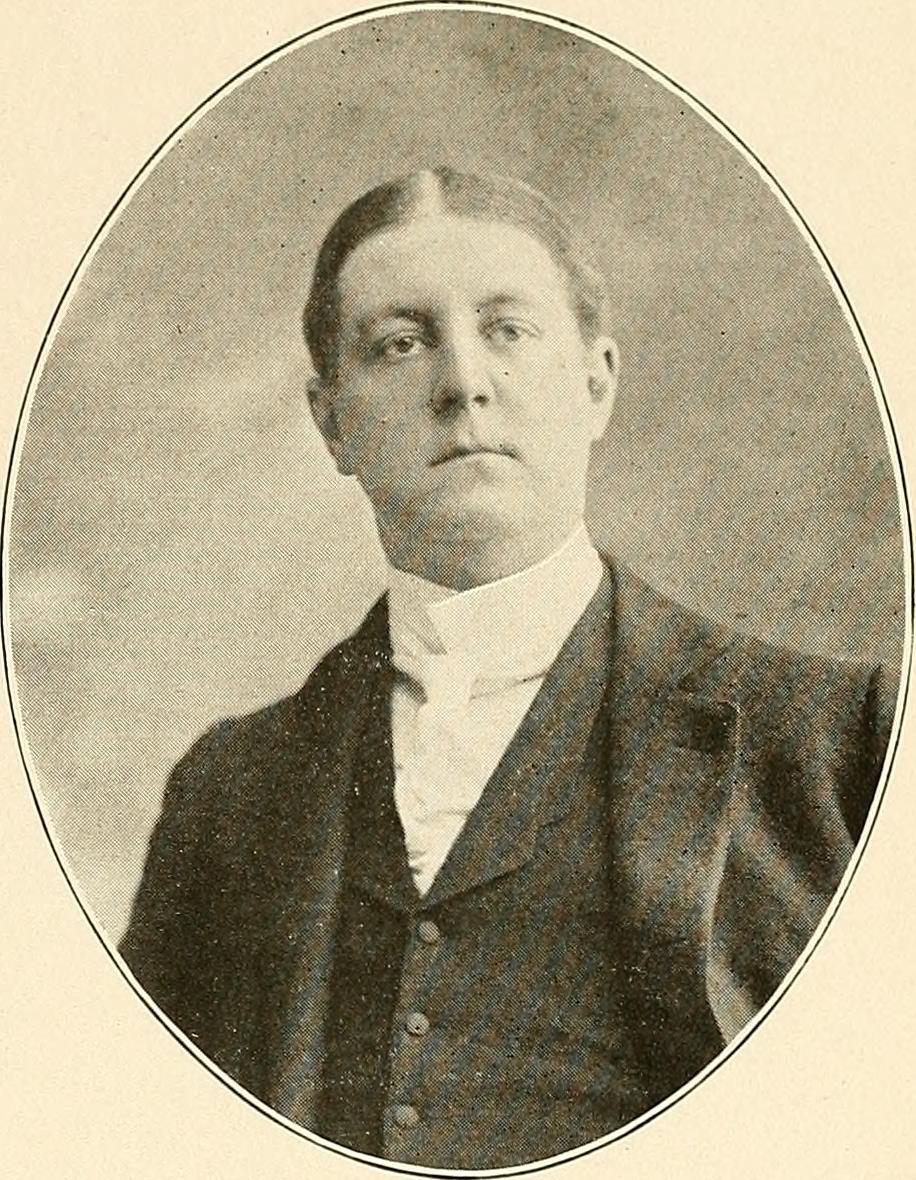
- Born: October 1, 1867; Allegheny, Pennsylvania
- Died: August 18, 1899 (aged 31); Allegheny, Pennsylvania
- Resting place: Allegheny Cemetery
- Education: Chester Military Academy
- Occupations: Businessman; football player; humorist
- Notable work: Billy Baxter's Letters

William J. Kountz Jr. (October 1, 1867 – August 18, 1899) was an American businessman and an early football player and manager for the Allegheny Athletic Association. He gained brief fame as a humorist with his "Billy Baxter" letters, a series of slang-filled short stories.

== Early life ==
Kountz was born in Allegheny, Pennsylvania and graduated from its public and high schools. His father was "Commodore" William J. Kountz, a businessman and steamboat line owner. Kountz Jr. attended the Chester Military Academy (now Widener University) for two years before joining the Nicola lumber firm as a traveling salesman. He later established a brickworks with his brother George at Harmarville, Pennsylvania.

== Football career ==
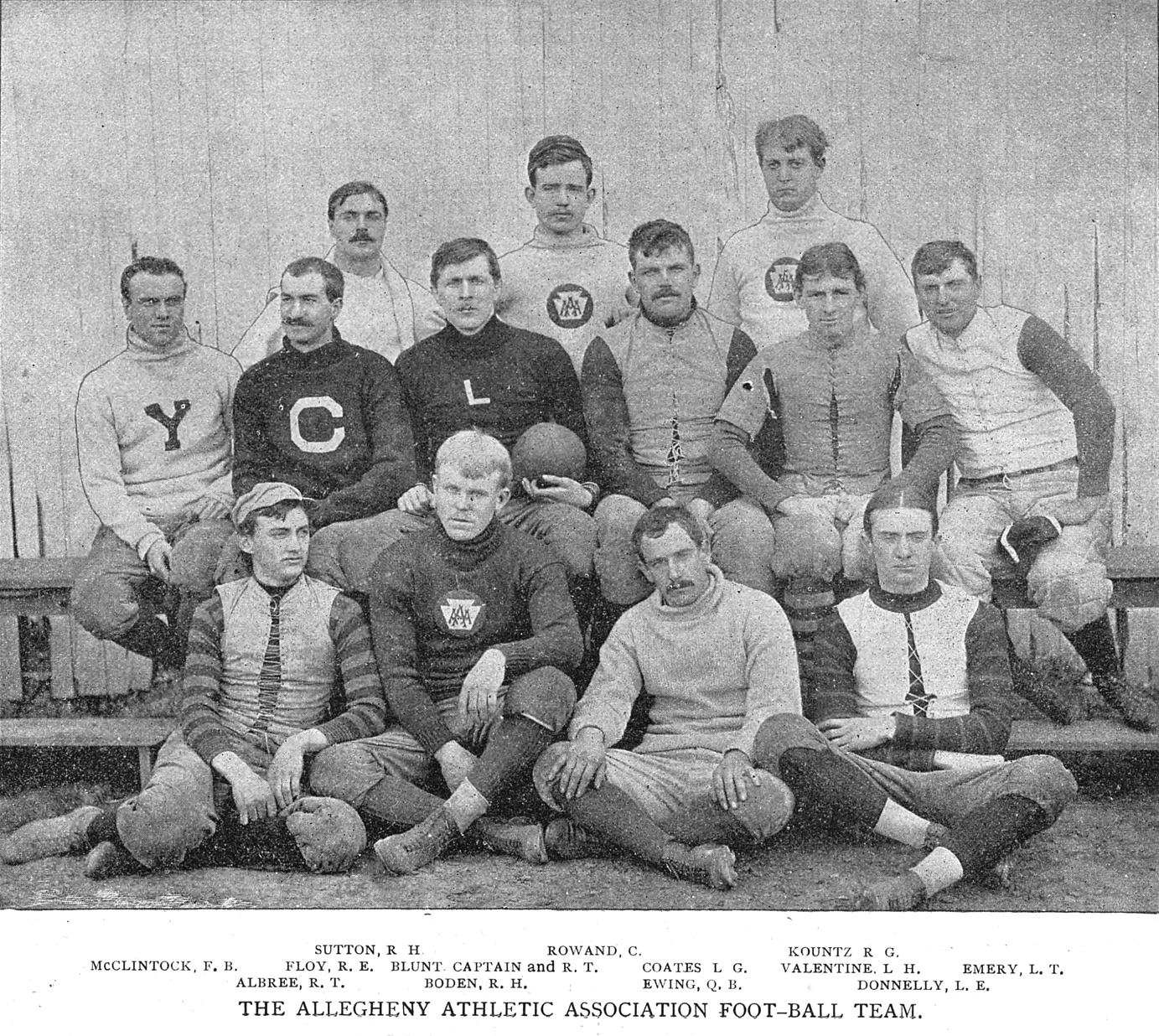
Kountz (back row, right) with the 1892 Allegheny Athletic Association football team

Kountz played guard for the Allegheny Athletic Association from 1891 to 1893. The Pittsburg Press described him as "as big as the side of a house and as strong as a horse and as good natured as the average." (Note: On another occasion when the Press called someone "as big as the side of a house", it claimed to be using "the language of Bill Kountz".)

In addition to playing guard, Kountz served as Allegheny's manager in 1892, the season in which the team fielded the first recorded professional football player, William "Pudge" Heffelfinger. Kountz took over the manager's job from O. D. Thompson, who resigned after the 1891 season. After Allegheny's 6–6 tie against their rival the Pittsburgh Athletic Club in October 1892, Kountz told the Pittsburgh media that Allegheny would not be using any "ringers" for a November rematch. However, on the day of the rematch between the two clubs, Heffelfinger, Sport Donnelly, and William C. Malley of the Chicago Athletic Association football team appeared in the Allegheny line-up. Kountz's status as team leader at that time is questionable: When a threat of a walkout by the Pittsburgh A.C. threatened the game, Thompson, not Kountz, represented Allegheny during the negotiations. It was also Thompson who signed the team's ledger showing payment to Heffelfinger.

Kountz was again elected Allegheny's manager in 1894. That season, Allegheny and Pittsburgh played a three-game series to determine the local football champion. The second game of the series was scheduled for November 6. Prior to the game, an unnamed Pittsburgh player offered the team's signals to Kountz for $20. Allegheny reported the incident to Pittsburgh and the player was dealt with properly. While both teams had hired ringers, this offense was considered blatant cheating and unacceptable. The Allegheny team went on to win the series and the championship.

== "Billy Baxter" letters ==
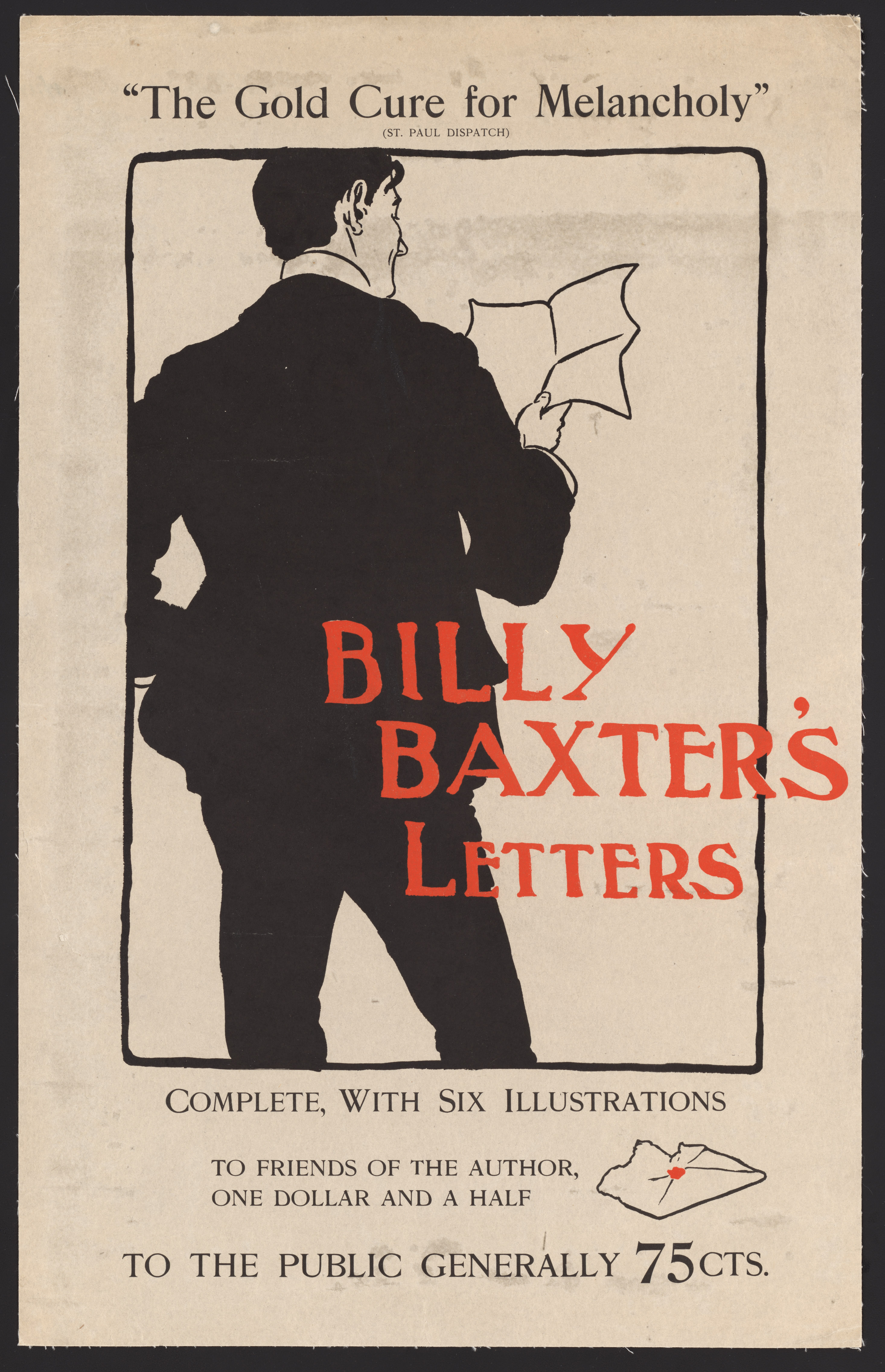
Promotional poster for the Billy Baxter's Letters compilation

Late in his short life, Kountz marketed a bottled tonic called Red Raven Splits. To promote the product, he wrote and distributed a series of humorous short story pamphlets that included Red Raven advertisements. The stories, each in the form of a letter written by "Billy Baxter" in a slangy style to his friend "Jim", were immediately and widely popular; Rollin Lynde Hartt wrote 20 years later that "no other humorist ever jumped into national fame so abruptly."

Writer George Ade credited Kountz with inventing the slang used in the Baxter stories. The originality of Kountz's writing paralleled that of his speech, with Ade noting "It is said that he talked 'Billy Baxter' letters all the time."

Kountz's time as a writer was cut short by his death of peritonitis and appendicitis at age 31. He was interred in Pittsburgh's Allegheny Cemetery. A posthumous compilation of his writings was published as a book titled Billy Baxter's Letters.
