= John Moorhead =

John Moorhead may refer to:

- John Moorhead (historian) (born 1948), Australian historian
- John Moorhead Jr. (1859-1927), American football player
- John A. Moorhead (1882-1931), American football player and coach

== See also ==
- John Morehead (disambiguation)
