= 1892 Allegheny Athletic Association football season =

American football team season

1892 Allegheny Athletic Association football
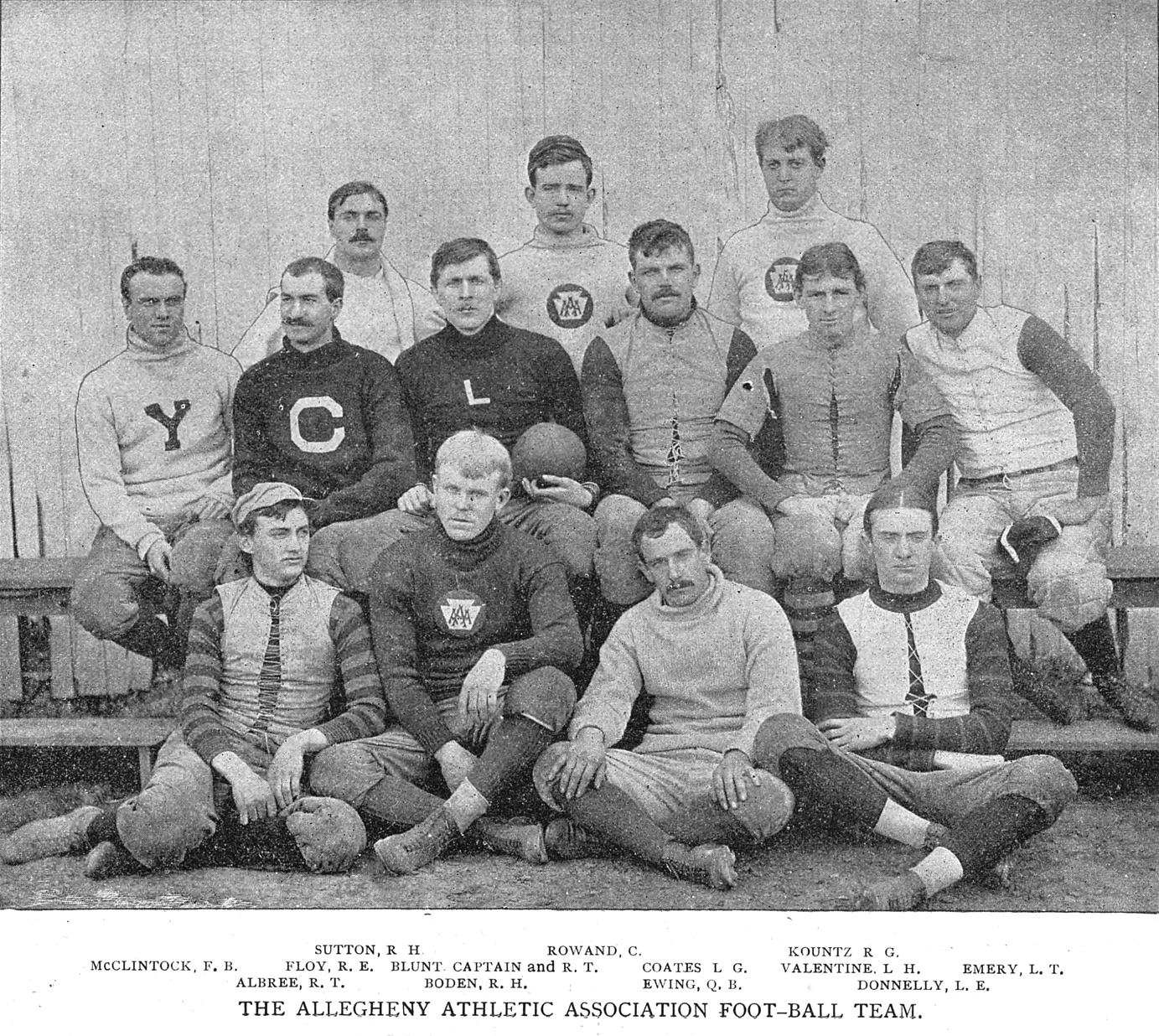
- 1892 AAA team prior to hiring pro players
- Record: 3–2–3
- Manager: Bill Kountz
- Captain: W. W. Blunt
- Home field: AAA Park

The Allegheny Athletic Association played its third season of American football in 1892. Managed by Bill Kountz, the team compiled a record of 3–2–3. The team fielded the first two professional football players on record, paying Pudge Heffelfinger $500 for a game on November 12 and Sport Donnelly $250 for the following game a week later.

Allegheny claimed the local (Pittsburgh area) championship by beating the Pittsburgh Athletic Club in the November 12 game, with the only scoring being a touchdown by Heffelfinger on a fumble return.

== Schedule ==
Date	Opponent	Site	Result	Source
October 8	Indiana Normal (PA)	AAA Park; Allegheny, PA	W 20–6	
October 21	at Pittsburgh Athletic Club	PAC Park; Pittsburgh, PA	T 6–6	
October 29	at Columbia Athletic Club	National Park; Washington, DC	T 0–0	
November 8	at Geneva	Geneva College grounds; Beaver Falls, PA	L 2–18	
November 12	Pittsburgh Athletic Club	AAA Park; Allegheny, PA	W 4–0	
November 19	Washington & Jefferson	AAA Park; Allegheny, PA	L 0–8	
November 24	at Cleveland Athletic Club	Athletic Field; Cleveland, OH	W 4–0	
January 2	Picked college team	AAA Park; Allegheny, PA	T 0–0	
