= Archibald Stevenson (American football) =

American football player and coach, lawyer (1871–1925)

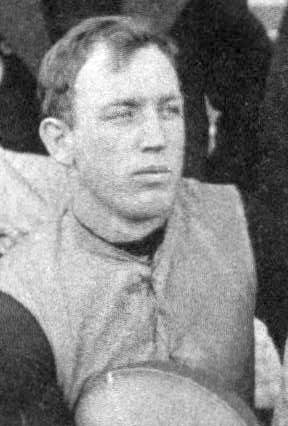
- Stevenson as Purdue football captain, 1892

Profile
- Position: Center

Personal information
- Born: July 13, 1871; Spencer County, Indiana, U.S.
- Died: February 10, 1925 (aged 53); Rockport, Indiana, U.S.
- Listed height: 6 ft 1 1/4 in (1.86 m)
- Listed weight: 192–205 lb (87–93 kg)

Career information
- College: Purdue

Career history

Playing
- Purdue (1889–1892); Chicago Athletic Association (1892–1895); Allegheny Athletic Association (1894, 1896); Pittsburgh Athletic Club (1897)

Coaching
- Duquesne Country & Athletic Club (1895) Line coach; Michigan (1897) Line coach

Archibald C. "Stevie" Stevenson (July 13, 1871 – February 10, 1925) was an American football player and coach. He was a standout center at Purdue University and later with clubs in Chicago and Pittsburgh that were active during the formative years of professional football in the 1890s.

== College career ==
A native of Spencer County, Indiana, Stevenson played college football for Purdue from 1889 to 1892, beginning at tackle before moving to center. He captained the team in his final year when the Boilermakers achieved an 8–0 record.

University of Chicago coach Amos Alonzo Stagg, in his 1927 memoir Touchdown!, told of Stevenson's performance in Chicago's 38–0 loss to Purdue in 1892: "Their bright line star was their center, Stevenson, an enormous fellow who broke up all our offense, by reaching over our center and pawing our quarter when we had the ball, interference which the offensive side is protected against now."

In track and field, Stevenson set Indiana state records in the shot put and hammer throw.

== Post-college career ==
=== Chicago Athletic Association ===
While in his last season with Purdue in 1892, Stevenson also played for the Chicago Athletic Association (CAA) football team while it was touring the East. He was recruited for the tour by his coaches at Purdue, Snake Ames and Sport Donnelley, both of whom were also members of the CAA and became his teammates there. Stevenson continued as a CAA player through 1895 and in October of that year replaced E. B. Camp as team captain.

Newspaper articles of the 1890s contained claims that Stevenson was considered "the best man in his position in the west", "possibly the best center the West ever has had", and even "the best center rush ever seen anywhere".

=== Pittsburgh ===
Stevenson became involved with some of the early Pittsburgh-area teams that were making an unprecedented transition from amateur to professional football. After his Chicago team left Pittsburgh following a victory over the Allegheny Athletic Association in 1894, Stevenson stayed behind and appeared as a "ringer" for Allegheny in its next game against the Pittsburgh Athletic Club for the local championship. Stevenson dominated the center of the line as Allegheny won 30–4. The terms of his engagement are unknown; according to a publication by the Professional Football Researchers Association, "Only the Three A's management knew what it cost to keep big Stevenson in town for an extra week."

When the Chicago AA revisited Pittsburgh the following year to play the Duquesne Country and Athletic Club, Stevenson again lingered in the city afterward and fielded offers from both Duquesne and the Pittsburgh Athletic Club. He accepted a short-term coaching role with Duquesne, taking charge of the line while head coach Bucky Vail oversaw the backfield. In Duquesne's next game against the Greensburg Athletic Association, coach Stevenson took the field as a player to start the second half, but Greensburg, claiming to have a letter from him promising not to play, refused to continue until he withdrew.

In 1896, Stevenson—no longer with the CAA—returned to the Pittsburgh area again, this time joining several of his old Chicago teammates to play for the Allegheny Athletic Association team, newly reconstituted after a year of inactivity. The 1896 "Three A's" played only two games on two consecutive days, winning both. With a supposed full lineup of paid players, the team has been credited as the first completely professional football team.

His last appearance in Pittsburgh was in the line of the Pittsburgh Athletic Club late in the 1897 season.

=== University of Michigan ===
Regarding Stevenson's last year with the Chicago AA in 1895, Caspar Whitney—writing in Harper's Weekly about violations of amateurism in Western football—alleged that the manager of the University of Michigan football team offered Stevenson $600 to play that season for the Wolverines. According to Whitney, Stevenson admitted accepting a matching counteroffer to stay with the CAA.

Stevenson ended up attending the University of Michigan after the season was over, but only as a law student, not a football player. The Detroit Free Press stated that he was ineligible to play at the university for having previously received money for coaching; this explanation did not mention any past compensation for playing.

After earning his law degree in June 1897, Stevenson returned to the university that fall to coach the line of the football team. In an alumni vs. varsity exhibition game that year, he played right guard for the alumni as they defeated the varsity 15–0.

== Life after football ==
After football, Stevenson practiced law in Rockport, Indiana. He married Eva Lieb, daughter of US Representative Charles Lieb. Active in politics, Stevenson was elected as a delegate to the 1908 Democratic National Convention. He reportedly was offered support to run for Congress but declined, preferring to stay with his law practice, 400 acres of land, and family and friends. He died in Rockport of a stroke in 1925 at age 53, survived by his wife and one daughter.
