= John Moorhead Jr. =

American football player (1859–1927)

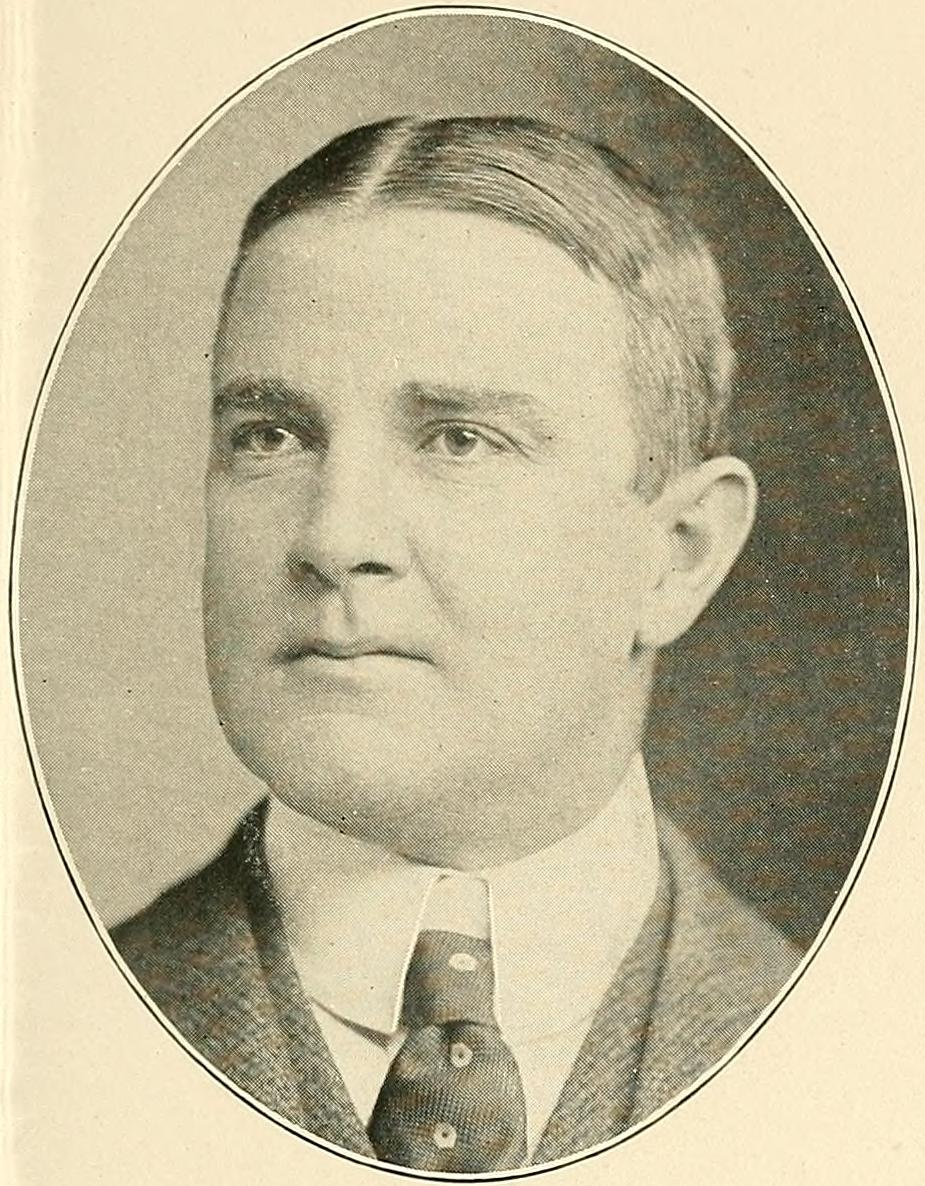

Profile
- Position: Center

Personal information
- Born: April 28, 1859; Pittsburgh, Pennsylvania, U.S.
- Died: March 15, 1927 (aged 67); Pittsburgh, Pennsylvania, U.S.

Career information
- College: Yale

Career history
- 1890–1891: Allegheny Athletic Association

Awards and highlights
- 2x W. Pennsylvania champ (1890, 1892); Helped Walter Camp develop football

John Moorhead Jr. (sometimes spelled Moorehead; April 28, 1859 – March 15, 1927) was an American football player for Yale. He played alongside Walter Camp, the inventor of the modern game, during the late 1870s. He was also a member, and club president, of the Allegheny Athletic Association, an amateur football club which fielded the first recognized professional player Pudge Heffelfinger. When Allegheny formed a football team in 1890, he took over the position of center. Meanwhile a fellow former Yale player, O. D. Thompson, took over as the club's manager and played tackle.

In a 1904 issue of The Independent, Walter Camp listed the following "leading players of the game" for the period 1876 to 1879. He named Moorhead as the top forwards in the game for those years.

John was also the father of John A. Moorhead and Turner Donaldson Moorhead, both of whom attended Yale. John A. Moorhead would play halfback at Yale, graduate in 1904 and later coach football at the University of Pittsburgh. In 1907, John disinherited his son John A. Moorhead for eloping with his mother's French maid. Moorhead later reconciled with his son, after the funeral of his daughter, Miss Anne Katherine Moorhead, who was killed in the Bronx wreck on the New York Central Railroad.

He died of pneumonia in Pittsburgh and was buried at Allegheny Cemetery.
