= 1890 Allegheny Athletic Association football season =

American football team season

1890 Allegheny Athletic Association football
- Record: 3–2–1
- Captain: O. D. Thompson
- Home field: Exposition Park

The Allegheny Athletic Association played its first season of American football in 1890. Led by captain and former Yale back O. D. Thompson, the team finished with a record of 3–2–1.

== Schedule ==
Date	Opponent	Site	Result	Source
October 11	Western University of Pennsylvania	Exposition Park; Allegheny, PA	W 38–0	
October 18	Shady Side Academy	Exposition Park; Allegheny, PA	W 32–0	
October 25	All-Pittsburgh	Exposition Park; Allegheny, PA	W 22–6	
November 1	Princeton Prep	Exposition Park; Allegheny, PA	L 6–44	
November 8	Detroit Athletic Club	Exposition Park; Allegheny, PA	T 6–6	
November 15	Cleveland Athletic Club	Exposition Park; Allegheny, PA	L 4–6	
