= John A. Moorhead =

American football player and coach (1882–1931)

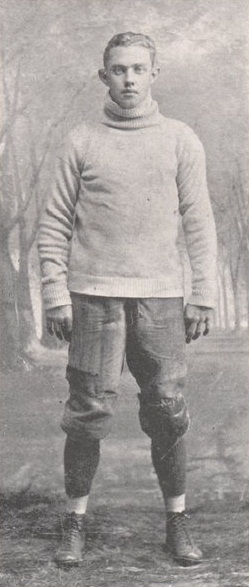
- Moorhead from The Owl, 1908

Biographical details
- Born: February 19, 1882; Sharpsburg, Pennsylvania, U.S.
- Died: August 18, 1931 (aged 49); Sewickley, Pennsylvania, U.S.

Playing career
- 1903–1904: Yale
- Position: Halfback

Coaching career (HC unless noted)
- 1906: Western U. of Pennsylvania (assistant)
- 1907–1908: Western U. of Pennsylvania / Pittsburgh (assistant)

Head coaching record
- Overall: 16–5

John Alston Moorhead (February 19, 1882 – August 18, 1931) was an American college football player and coach. He served as the head football coach at the University of Pittsburgh during the 1907 and 1908 seasons; the school known as the Western University of Pennsylvania before 1908. Moorhead applied for the coaching job after being cut off by his father for eloping with his mother's French maid. Prior to coaching at Pittsburgh, He played halfback while attending Yale University, from which he graduated in 1904.

Some historical records from refer to him as John A. Moorehead and as James A. Moor(e)head. He was also referred to as "Jim".

== Pittsburgh football ==
In 1906 John A. Moorhead took on assistant coaching duties for the Western University of Pennsylvania's (now the University of Pittsburgh) football team under then head coach Edgar Wingard. In 1907, he was hired as the head coach of the team, guiding it to an 8–2 record, with the team's only losses coming at the hands of Cornell University and Washington & Jefferson College. Highlighting the season was a 6–0 win over Penn State, which at the time was particularly noteworthy as it had been only the second time that the university's football team had defeated the Nittany Lions in the burgeoning rivalry between the two schools. Moorhead was retained as head coach in 1908, and guided the team to an 8–3 record. During that season, he helped to facilitate the implementation of the first known use of numbers on the uniforms of football players. In 1909, Moorhead withdrew his name from the candidacy for that season's coaching position at the urging of his father who wanted him to have a more direct role in the family's business interests. However, John A. did use his influence to help elect Joseph H. Thompson as his successor to the head coaching position at Pittsburgh.

== Family ==
John A. Moorhead was born into one of Pittsburgh's oldest and wealthiest families. His father, John Moorhead Jr., was an executive in the steel industry, president of the city's first professional football team, the Allegheny Athletic Association, and a former Yale football player alongside Walter Camp. Like his father, John A. attended Yale where he played halfback on the football team, and graduated in 1904. In 1906, John A. arrived at his family's home in Allegheny, Pennsylvania, just as his mother, Anna Alston, was returning from a trip to Paris. Alston was accompanied home by a French maid named Marguerite Clements. John A. and Marguerite fell in love, and their relationship, which was kept a secret, blossomed. However, word of the affair soon reached Alston, who then fired Clements. Upon hearing this, John A. declared, "If she goes, I go with her." The two then married in New York City the following day, but John A. was subsequently cut off from his family's fortune and forced to make his own way in life.

John A. and his father reportedly reconciled during the February, 1907 funeral of Miss Anne Katherine Moorhead, the sister of John A., who was killed in a train wreck on the New York Central Railroad in the Bronx. The coaching success of Moorhead, particularly the 1907 win over rival Penn State, and his ability to provide for himself and his wife, further helped to change the attitude of the elder Moorhead towards his son. According to The New York Times, the father had "taken his son back to his heart, told him that he has demonstrated that he is every inch a man, and extended to him and his young wife the place that belongs to them in the family circle".

John A. and Marguerite would go on to have one child, Marjorie Anne Moorhead. John A. also had a brother, Donald Moorhead, who also attended Yale.

== Death ==
Moorhead died at age 49 in his home in Sewickley, Pennsylvania, due to a fall that resulted in a fractured skull. He was buried at Allegheny Cemetery, Pittsburgh.

== Head coaching record ==
Year	Team	Overall	Conference	Standing	Bowl/playoffs
Western University of Pennsylvania / Pittsburgh Panthers (Independent) (1907–1908)
1907	Western University of Pennsylvania	8–2			
1908	Pittsburgh	8–3			
Western University of Pennsylvania / Pittsburgh:		16–5			
Total:		16–5			
