= John Van Cleve =

American football player and coach (1871–1914)

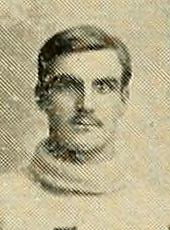
- Van Cleve at Lehigh

Profile
- Positions: End, halfback

Personal information
- Born: September 26, 1871; South Amboy, New Jersey, U.S.
- Died: January 9, 1914 (aged 42); Pittsburgh, Pennsylvania, U.S.
- Listed height: 5 ft 9 1/2 in (1.77 m)
- Listed weight: 145 lb (66 kg)

Career history

Playing
- Lehigh (1892); Allegheny Athletic Association (1893–1894); Duquesne Country and Athletic Club (1895); Pittsburgh Athletic Club (1896–1897); Pittsburgh College (1898)

Coaching
- Pittsburgh College (1898)

Awards and highlights
- W. Pennsylvania Champion (1894); One of first 5 known pro football players

John (Note: Some modern writings refer to him as James Van Cleve, at odds with contemporary sources giving his first name as John.) Moore Van Cleve (September 26, 1871 – January 9, 1914) was an American football player and coach, and one of the first known professional players of the sport. After playing college football at Lehigh, he played five seasons for independent teams in or near Pittsburgh and served in 1898 as player-coach for Pittsburgh College, later known as Duquesne University.

== Professional football career ==
Van Cleve became one of the earliest known people paid to play football when he, Ollie Rafferty, and Peter Wright signed contracts with the Allegheny Athletic Association for $50 per game for the entire 1893 season. Only Pudge Heffelfinger and Sport Donnelly are known to have been professionals earlier.

Van Cleve again played for Allegheny in 1894. During a game against the Pittsburgh Athletic Club, Allegheny's quarterback, A. S. Valentine, was thrown out of the game after coming to the aid of Van Cleve during a fight against Pittsburgh's Joe Trees. After several appeals, Valentine left the field reportedly "crying like a baby". During the 1895 season, Allegheny did not field a team after learning the club was under investigation by the Amateur Athletic Union for secretly paying its players. As a result, Van Cleve played for the upstart Duquesne Country and Athletic Club.

Van Cleve played end for the Pittsburgh Athletic Club in 1896. He began the following season coaching and captaining a team from Sewickley, Pennsylvania. The Pittsburgh Post reported that he would not rejoin the Pittsburgh Athletic Club in 1897, noting manager Bob Hamilton's statement that no paid player would be on the team; however, after a new manager took over for Hamilton during the season, Van Cleve was brought back.

== College career ==
Prior to his professional career, Van Cleve played college football at Lehigh University, where he studied electrical engineering. On October 15, 1892, Van Cleve scored Lehigh's only touchdown in a loss against the Orange Athletic Club. He would play for Lehigh five days later during a 50–0 loss to the Princeton Tigers. Van Cleve also played lacrosse and was a member of Lehigh's 1893 national championship team. He was president of the school's "Starvation Club".

Van Cleve served as the head football coach at Pittsburgh Catholic College of the Holy Ghost—later renamed Duquesne University—in 1898. He also played for the team as an end. The Pittsburgh Post described him as the lightest man on a team that averaged 173 pounds; he had been listed four years earlier at 5 ft 9 1/2 in (1.77 m) and 145 pounds (66 kg).

== Head coaching record ==
Year	Team	Overall	Conference	Standing	Bowl/playoffs
Pittsburgh College (Independent) (1898)
1898	Pittsburgh College	6–4–1			
Pittsburgh College:		6–4–1			
Total:		6–4–1			
