= John Morehead =

John Morehead is the name of:

- John H. Morehead (1861–1942), Governor of Nebraska
- John Motley Morehead (1796–1866), Governor of North Carolina
- John Motley Morehead II (1866–1923), U.S. Representative from North Carolina
- John Motley Morehead III (1870–1965), chemist, U.S. ambassador to Sweden, and noted philanthropist

== See also ==
- John Moorhead
