= A. S. Valentine =

American football player (1871–1921)

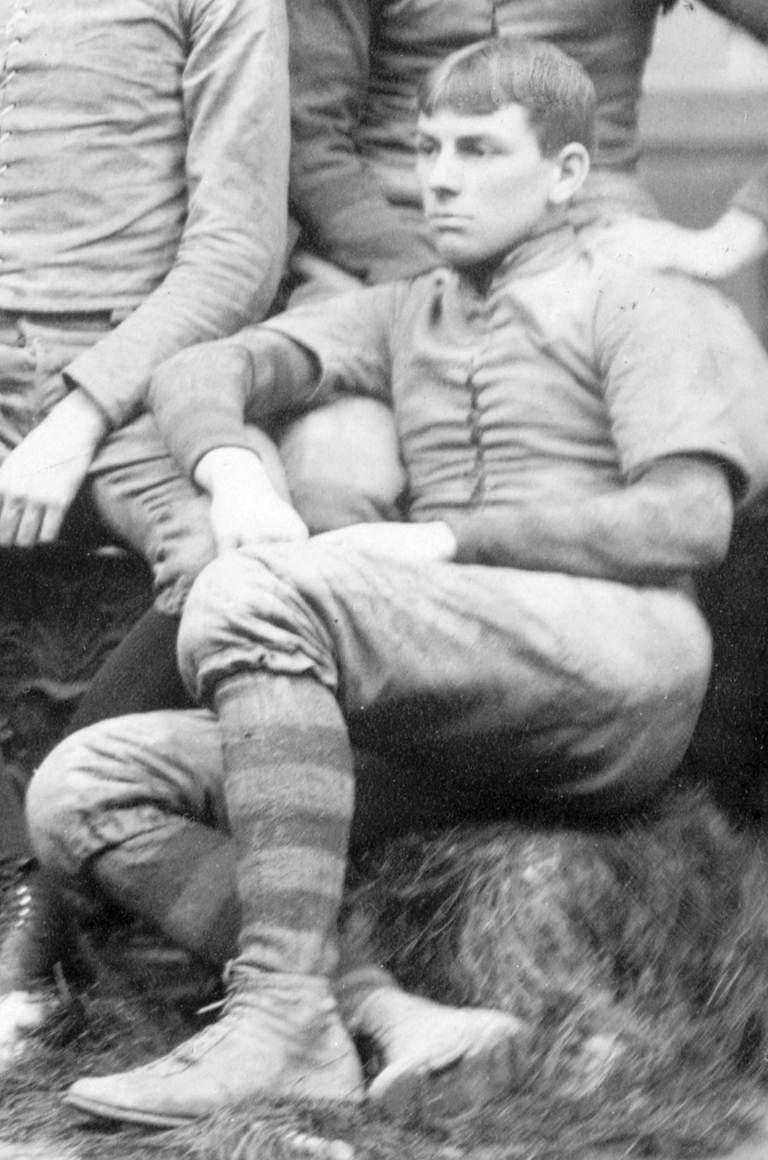
- Valentine at Penn in 1889

Profile
- Positions: Quarterback, halfback

Personal information
- Born: July 11, 1871
- Died: July 29, 1921 (aged 50)
- Listed height: 5 ft 7 in (1.70 m)
- Listed weight: 155 lb (70 kg)

Career information
- College: Penn

Career history
- Allegheny Athletic Association (1890–1891); Pittsburgh Athletic Club (1892); Allegheny Athletic Association (1892–1894); Duquesne Country and Athletic Club (1896)

Abram Sharpless Valentine (July 11, 1871 – July 29, 1921) was an American football player during the formative years of professional football. He played mostly with the Allegheny Athletic Association, primarily as a quarterback and sometimes as a halfback.

== Football career ==
Valentine played college football and baseball at the University of Pennsylvania. After college, he went to Pittsburgh, where in 1890 he joined the newly formed football team of the Allegheny Athletic Association. In Allegheny's first season, Valentine led the team by scoring 8 of its 21 touchdowns. He served as the team's quarterback in 1890 and 1891.

He jumped to the rival Pittsburgh Athletic Club in 1892, playing for that team in its first two games before suddenly and without warning returning to the Allegheny team. Some Pittsburgh A.C. members accused Allegheny of enticing him back, while others charged he had all along been a spy for them. During Allegheny's two games against the Pittsburgh A.C. that year, Valentine played left halfback. It was for the second of those two games that Pudge Heffelfinger, who lined up in front of Valentine at left guard, received $500 to become football's first known professional player.

Valentine played one game for Shady Side Academy in 1891 as that team was defeated by the Pittsburgh Athletic Club, 26–0. During a game against the Detroit Athletic Club on November 11, 1893, Valentine reportedly openly punched Detroit's quarterback. The officials ignored the incident, and the Detroiter used the next play to retaliate against Valentine. Shortly after, a brawl between the two clubs erupted. Allegheny would go on to win the game 18–0. In 1894, during a game against the Pittsburgh A.C., Valentine was thrown out of the game after coming to the aid of teammate John Van Cleve during a fight against Pittsburgh's Joe Trees. After several appeals, Valentine left the field "crying like a boy" in the words of the Pittsburgh Post.

In 1895, Allegheny declined to field a team after learning of an investigation into the club by the Amateur Athletic Union, over reports that the team had been secretly paying players. As a result, Valentine became a referee. He officiated a game that year between the Duquesne Country and Athletic Club and Greensburg. The game was filled with fights and arguments. Valentine refused to return to the game for the second half.

Valentine joined the Duquesne Country and Athletic Club as a player in 1896. Later that season, he was enlisted as a substitute on a short-lived revival of his old team, the Allegheny Athletic Association. The 1896 Allegheny team, which played only two games, has been credited as the first completely professional football team. Valentine was not recorded as having played in either game.

== Life outside football ==
Valentine was from Philadelphia. He was the youngest son of E. M. Valentine, of an old Centre County, Pennsylvania family. Valentine married Caroline Marqueze Haseltine in 1899, at which time he was connected with the Pressed Steel Car Company of Pittsburgh.
