= 1896 Allegheny Athletic Association football season =

American football team season

1896 Allegheny Athletic Association football
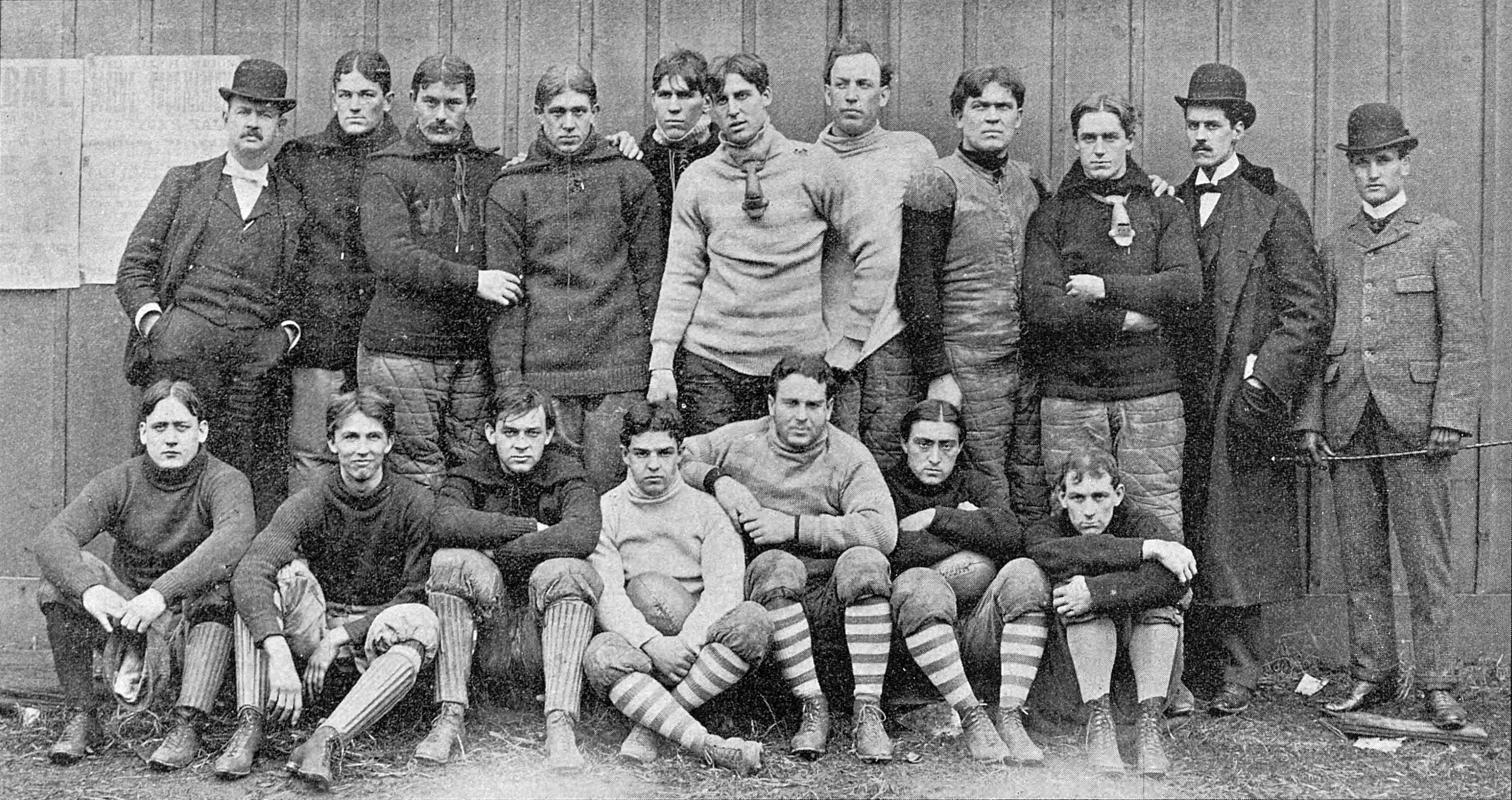
- Record: 2–0
- Manager: O. D. Thompson
- Captain: Pudge Heffelfinger
- Home field: Exposition Park

The Allegheny Athletic Association played its sixth and last season of American football in 1896. With a new roster made up largely of former college All-Americans and current and former Chicago Athletic Association players, the team played only two games, on consecutive days, winning both by shutout. The Pro Football Hall of Fame credits the 1896 Allegheny team as the first completely professional football team.

== Schedule ==
Date	Opponent	Site	Result	Attendance	Source
November 10	Duquesne Country and Athletic Club	Exposition Park; Allegheny, PA	W 12–0	2,000–4,000+	
November 11	Pittsburgh Athletic Club	Exposition Park; Allegheny, PA	W 18–0	2,000–3,000	

== Personnel ==
=== Roster ===
==== Starters ====
- William H. "Pork" Aldrich – quarterback
- George H. Brooke – fullback
- Paul G. Brown – right end
- Ben "Sport" Donnelly – left guard (2nd game)
- Phil S. Graver – right halfback
- Harry G. Hadden – right tackle
- William "Pudge" Heffelfinger – captain, left guard (1st game), left halfback (2nd game)
- Walter Howard – left halfback (1st game)
- Langdon "Biffy" Lea – left tackle
- Archibald Stevenson – center
- Lee K. "Doc" Stewart – right guard
- Thomas "Doggie" Trenchard – left end

==== Reserves ====
- Robert Lynn Osborne
- Abram S. Valentine
- Fielding H. Yost

=== Management ===
- O. D. Thompson – manager
- W. M. Greenwood – assistant manager
