= Rollin Lynde Hartt =

American journalist

Rollin Lynde Hartt (1869–1946) was an early 20th-century journalist and congregational minister. His reporting and views on the Fundamentalist–Modernist Controversy were known nationally and mentioned in Time Magazine. His 1909 articles People at Play appeared in The Atlantic Monthly and are considered an important exception to a near-quarantine on information about then-current popular culture.

He was educated at Williams College (B.A., 1892) and Andover Theological Seminary (1896), serving in pastorates in Montana and Massachusetts.

== Selected publications ==
- The Man himself 1924
- "Scopes Trial: What Lies Beyond Dayton" July 22, 1925 The Nation
- "I'd Like to Show You Harlem!". The Independent. April, 1921. p. 334-.
- Confessions of a Clergyman. Rollin Lynde Hartt. McBride, Nast & company, 1915.
- The People at Play. Rollin Lynde Hartt. Houghton Mifflin, 1909.
- Understanding the French. Rollin Lynde Hartt. McBride, Nast & Company, 1914.
