= Ollie Rafferty =

American football player

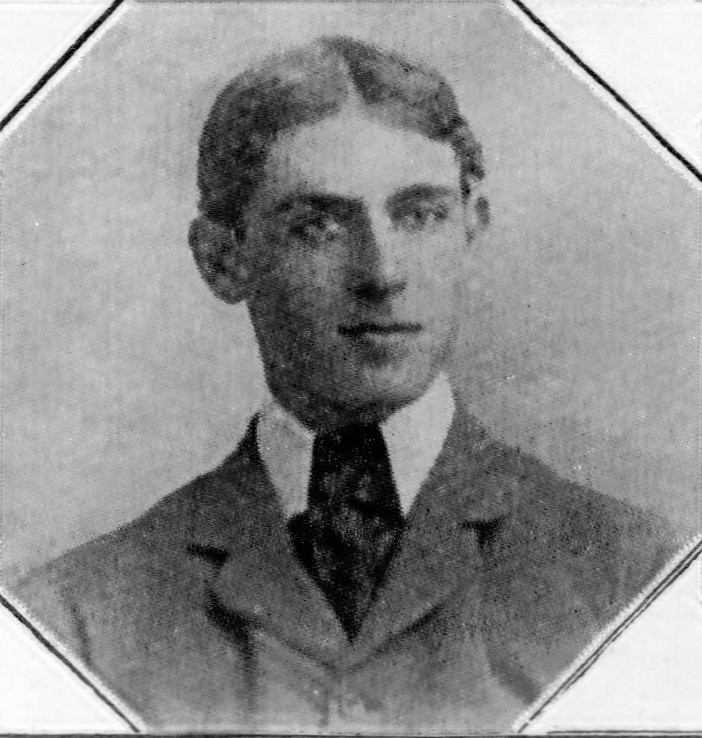
- Rafferty from the 1894 Spalding's Football Guide

Profile
- Position: Halfback

Personal information
- Born: October 30, 1873; Pittsburgh, Pennsylvania, U.S.
- Died: July 18, 1922 (aged 48); Watertown, New York, U.S.
- Listed height: 5 ft 10 in (1.78 m)
- Listed weight: 160 lb (73 kg)

Career history
- Allegheny Athletic Association (1893–1894)

Oliver William Rafferty (October 30, 1873 – July 18, 1922) was an American football player for the Allegheny Athletic Association. He was one of the first recorded professional players of the sport.

== Early life ==
Rafferty was born in Pittsburgh, where he attended the Shady Side Academy. Upon graduation, he entered Princeton as a member of the class of 1896, but is not known to have remained there beyond his freshman year of 1892–93.

== Football career ==
In his brief time at Princeton, Rafferty played on the "scrub" football team. At home over winter break, he played tackle on a picked "Collegian" team – composed of Western Pennsylvanians attending eastern schools – that played the Allegheny Athletic Association (AAA) to a scoreless tie on January 2, 1893. His brother Gilbert, a guard, played alongside him on the Collegian team and would also join him on the AAA squads of the next two seasons.

For the 1893 season, Ollie Rafferty, John Van Cleve and Peter Wright were under contract with the AAA to receive $50 per game, making them the first known players after Pudge Heffelfinger and Sport Donnelley to have been paid to play football. Rafferty played halfback and served as team captain during that season. He returned to Allegheny in 1894 to help the club win the local championship. In 1895, he was poised to return to play for Allegheny, but the club canceled its season after learning of an investigation by the Amateur Athletic Union into reports that the team had secretly paid its players.
