= Peter Wright (American football) =

American football player

Pete Wright
Profile
- Positions: Fullback, Quarterback

Career history
- Allegheny Athletic Association (1893)

Peter Wright was an early professional football player. In 1893, he was under contract by the Allegheny Athletic Association to be paid $50 per game for the entire season. That season Peter, Ollie Rafferty and John Van Cleve were all under contract.
