= Allegheny Athletic Association =

Club that fielded the first professional American football player

Logo

General information
- Founded: 1890
- Folded: 1896
- Stadium: Exposition Park; Recreation Park
- Headquartered: Allegheny, Pennsylvania, United States
- Colors: Blue, White

Personnel
- General manager: O. D. Thompson (1890–1891, 1893, 1896); Billy Kountz (1892, 1894)
- Head coach: Sport Donnelly (1893)

Nickname
- "Three A's"

League / conference affiliations
- Independent

The Allegheny Athletic Association was an athletic club that fielded the first ever professional American football player and later the first fully professional football team. The organization was founded in 1890 as a regional athletic club in Allegheny, Pennsylvania, which is today the North Side of Pittsburgh.

== History ==
=== Origins ===
The Allegheny team was assembled in 1890. At that time, athletic clubs and associations, ranging from the best with extensive facilities to local organizations with minimum meeting rooms, were in their prime as a source of fraternal fellowship for athletes. In most sports, Allegheny provided very little competition for the more established East End Gymnastic Club (EEGC), which in 1892 became the Pittsburgh Athletic Club. Allegheny soon took up football largely when the club discovered that it could give them a recruiting edge over the East Enders. Many Allegheny club members had gone to eastern colleges and played football. Members O. D. Thompson, who had become a successful Pittsburgh lawyer, and John Moorhead Jr. were former teammates of Walter Camp, the inventor of the modern game. The team immediately gave Allegheny a strong following. Allegheny's backfield during that inaugural year had A. S. Valentine at quarterback, two track stars in Harry Oliver and Harry Fry as the halfbacks, and O.D. Thompson at fullback.

The club's inaugural season began on October 11, 1890, when Allegheny played the Western University of Pennsylvania (later renamed the University of Pittsburgh) at Exposition Park, on what is today the parking area between PNC Park and Heinz Field, in front of a crowd of 500 spectators. Allegheny won the game easily, 38–0, but the contest was significant since it marked the official start of Pitt's football program. Prior to the game, Allegheny was to play Shady Side Academy, but the team failed to show up for the game and were replaced by the Western University team. Allegheny went on to defeat Shady Side Academy a week later, 32–0.

Next on the schedule was the "All-Pittsburghs", who were really a collection of local athletes masquerading as a team. Significantly, several of the pick-ups were members of the East End Gyms such as L. F. Kirchner and Grant Dibert. This game foreshadowed the start of the upcoming rivalry between Allegheny and the Pittsburgh Athletic Club. Allegheny would go on to defeat the inexperienced team by a score of 22–6.

Allegheny scheduled a game for November 1, 1890 against the Princeton Preparatory team, paying them $150. The prep team was a far cry from the Princeton's varsity team. Allegheny would end up losing to the touring Princeton team, 44–6. The season concluded with a 6–6 tie with the Detroit Athletic Club and a 6–4 loss to the Cleveland Athletic Club, both amateur club squads. However, the Allegheny Athletic Association was regarded as the local champions that season.

=== Threat from Pittsburgh ===
Allegheny began their 1891 season recognized as the premier football team in western Pennsylvania. The year began with the club's admission into the Amateur Athletic Union, which increased the prestige of the club, whose membership of more than 330 now equaled that of the older Pittsburgh Athletic Club (still officially called the East End Gym at the time). However, by early October, the Pittsburgh club emerged onto the football scene. At this time, Harry Fry, who was in the line-up for Allegheny a year earlier, jumped to the East End team.

Allegheny finally began their 1891 season on October 24. Their lineup included veteran players A.S. Valentine, Ed Brainard, Harry and John Oliver, O.D. Thompson and John Moorhead. Norman McClintock, formerly of Yale, was a new addition for the team at end. Surprisingly, Doc Proctor of the East End team appeared in Allegheny's starting backfield that day. The team played against the Greensburg Athletic Association to post a 10–0 win. However, a week later, Allegheny lost to the Cleveland Athletic Club, led by Billy Rhodes, 22–4.

In a November 11, 1891 game against the Dayton Athletic Club, a dispute arose over the rules of the still relatively new game of football. When the game was over, the score stood either 10–6 Dayton or 10–6 Allegheny, or possibly 6–6, depending on just how the rules were applied. To resolve the dispute, a claim was filed directly to the modern game's founder, Walter Camp. Despite Allegheny's O.D. Thompson being Camp's student and friend, the decision by Camp ended in a 10–6 Dayton victory. After this second loss in a row, Allegheny was able to climb back to .500 with an 8–4 rally over Washington & Jefferson. However, in order to put together a competitive team, Allegheny had to convince two brothers, Ross and Lawson Fiscus of the Greensburg Athletic Association, to play for them. Without the Fiscus brothers in their line-up, the game may have ended in another Allegheny loss. Meanwhile, the East End team was on a five game winning streak.

Sports fans in the area soon demanded a game between East End and Allegheny. Manager O.D. Thompson tried to avoid the issue, even after he was accused of cowardice by critics. Thompson secretly knew how good the East End team was and may have feared what a one-sided loss to their arch-rivals might do to the club's memberships and clubhouse subscriptions. Thompson had to recruit not only the Fiscus brothers but also Doc Proctor and Grant Dibert of East End to fill out his backfield for the final scheduled game. Under the circumstances, Allegheny was in no condition to play a high-stakes game against East End.

The team's final game of the season was a rematch against the Cleveland Athletic Club. Allegheny's additions of Dibert, Proctor and the Fiscus brothers made the matchup more even. Meanwhile, Cleveland's Billy Rhodes did not make the trip to Allegheny. Played at Exhibition Park, the game ended in a 6–6 tie after being called because of darkness. After the game, O.D. Thompson announced his retirement as the club's manager. However, newspaper reports in the Pittsburgh Post hinted that Thompson was forced out as the team's manager. The paper stated that unnamed club officials were very critical of how the football team was being run. Many were critical over Thompson fielding the team with East End players. An article by the Professional Football Researchers Association pointed out that the manager of an amateur team had very few ways to compel his men to do anything; that had Thompson not used East End players he might have had to ask for volunteers from the crowd; that the falling attendance for the club's games was mainly due to the inclement weather that was experienced in the area throughout the autumn; and finally that a game with East End might have hurt the club's reputation more than it would have helped bringing in money to the organization.

=== Path to professional football ===
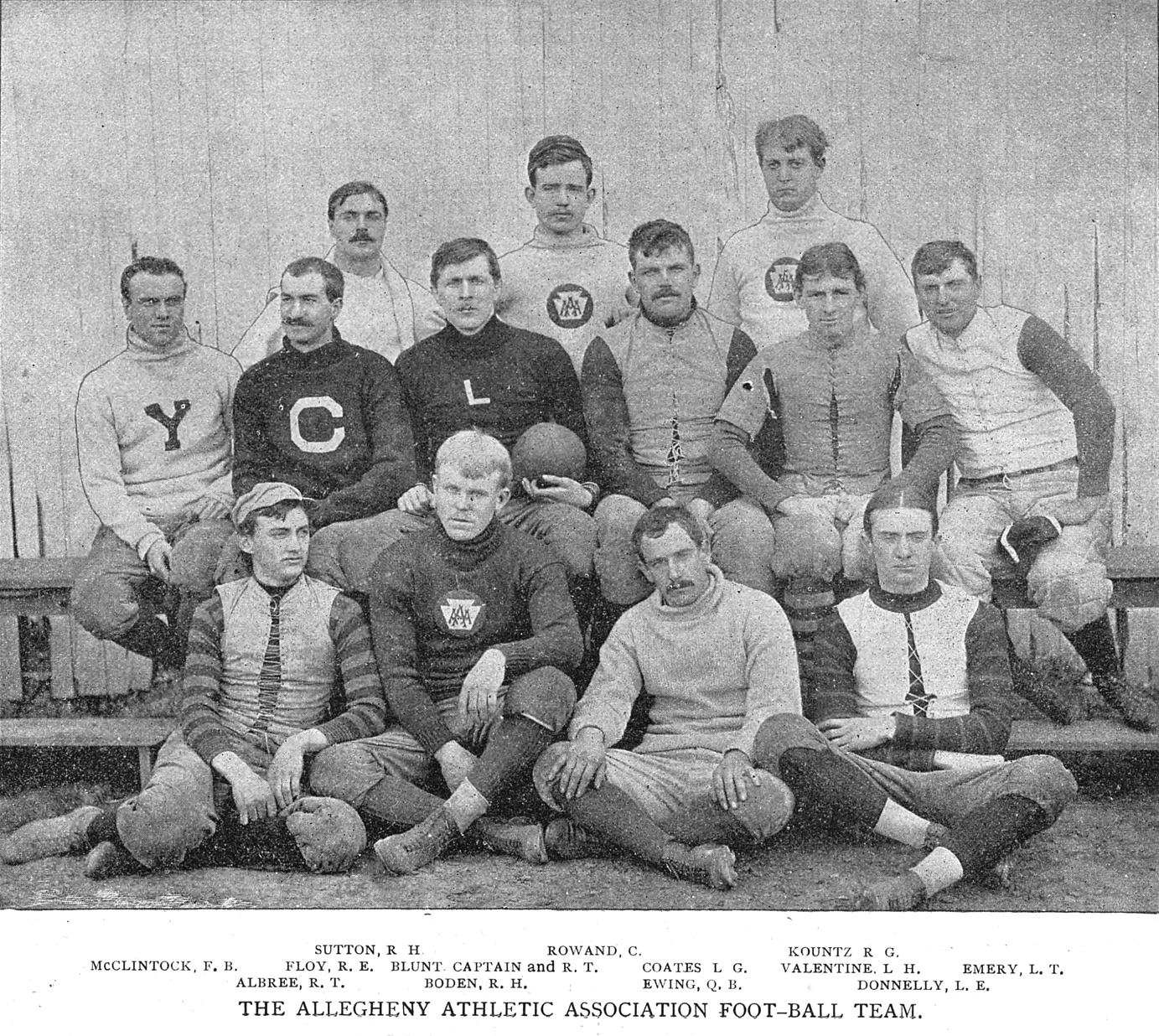
1892 team, on which Pudge Heffelfinger (not shown) became the first professional football player on record

Up until now, there was no proof of professional athletes being used in western Pennsylvania sports. There were some questions as to why the Fiscus brothers were willing to travel over 30 miles to play for Allegheny when they had a perfectly good team in Greensburg. Or why Doc Proctor, Grant Dibert, and a couple of other Pittsburgh players performed for Allegheny, while the Pittsburgh club was outraged over Allegheny's refusal to schedule a game with them. However, these examples could be ascribed to enthusiasm by the players and persuasiveness by the team managers.

The 1892 season would showcase the first two games of the Pittsburgh-Allegheny rivalry. On October 8, Allegheny played its only warm-up game against the Indiana Normal School at Exposition Park. Norman McClintock would score four touchdowns in a 20–6 Allegheny win. New changes to the team included tackle, W.W. Blunt, who was listed as team captain, while guard Billy Kountz replaced Thompson as the team's manager. The reason that Allegheny played in only one exhibition game was so that the team could effectively hide its strengths and weaknesses from Pittsburgh's scouts. The game between was scheduled for October 21, Columbus Day, to be played at Pittsburgh's field.

Animosity between the two clubs remained high. The latest incident involved quarterback A.S. Valentine, who jumped to the Pittsburgh team at the beginning of the 1892 season and played in their first two games. However, without warning, he suddenly jumped back to Allegheny. Some accused Allegheny of enticing him back, while others charged he had all along been a spy for Allegheny all along. Gamblers and odds-makers listed the Pittsburgh team as slight favorites because the game would be played on their home field and because they had more experience working together.

Shortly before the game, the Pittsburgh A.C. was in need of a replacement at center, due to their regular player being injured. Pittsburgh captain Charley Aull reportedly told the officials from both teams that he had just run into an old friend named "Stayer", who agreed to play in the game at center. Both teams agreed to let "Stayer" play. The hard-fought game between the two clubs ended in a 6–6 tie, with L. F. Kirchner (for Pittsburgh) and Doc Proctor scoring the game's only scores. As a result of the contest, the two clubs divided $1,200 in gate receipts and each processed about 100 new members in the following two months.

The game only added fuel to rivalry as Pittsburgh accused Allegheny of dirty play to purposely injure Kirchner. Meanwhile, Allegheny countered that Kirchner was a professional who didn't belong on the field anyway. Meanwhile, Allegheny's E.V. Paul announced that he was willing to bet anyone that Pittsburgh had indeed used a professional in the game. Suspicion soon focused on the mysterious Pittsburgh player "Stayer". Allegheny soon began with accusing "Stayer" of being a hired player after the supposedly injured player he replaced appeared healthy the next day when Pittsburgh had another game. It was soon discovered that "Stayer's" real name was A.C. Read, the captain of the Penn State University football team. The revelation came a shocker to sports fans in the area. Now neither club would hesitate to take the final step to professionalism. The rematch was scheduled to be played in three weeks.

On the day of the rematch between the two clubs, Sport Donnelly, William C. Malley and Pudge Heffelfinger of the Chicago Athletic Association Football team appeared in the Allegheny line-up. Pittsburgh objected to the new additions in the lineup and the game was originally called a 6–0 forfeit after the Pittsburgh players walked off the field in protest. However, former manager O.D. Thompson reappeared as a negotiator on behalf of Allegheny. After arguments and deliberations, the players took the field. The game ended in a 4–0 Allegheny win, with Heffelfinger scoring the games only points on a 35-yard fumble recovery for a touchdown. While the three Chicago players gave Allegheny an advantage, they had never practiced with their new teammates and a lot of mistakes were made. This kept the tight-knit Pittsburgh team competitive throughout the game.

Both teams were upset about the outcome of the game. Allegheny was unable to collect on their bets, while Pittsburgh was angered over the Chicago players being imported into the contest. Pittsburgh called Heffelfinger a paid professional and insisted he had been paid $500 to play in the game. On top of that, the team charged that all three Chicago men had received twice their travel expenses, making them paid professionals. Meanwhile, Allegheny accused Pittsburgh of hiring Simon Martin, who was promised a job at the club for his participation. Both teams threatened to take their complaints to the Amateur Athletic Association, but later backed down after realizing that each team's own activities would be closely scrutinized.

There were reports that some Allegheny players had quit the team rather than be associated with professionalism. Meanwhile, some regular A.A.A. players wanted to be paid for playing. Pittsburgh newspapers continued to refer to both teams as amateurs while printing most of the charges of professionalism.

==== First professional player ====
In the 1960s, a man named Nelson Ross walked into the office of Dan Rooney, the president of the Pittsburgh Steelers of the National Football League. After a brief discussion, the man gave Rooney a typed 49-page manuscript about the early history of pro football. Ross' examination of Pittsburgh newspapers indicated that the first pro football player actually was Pudge Heffelfinger, an all-American guard from Yale, who was hired play for Allegheny on November 12, 1892, for $500. Up until then John Brallier, of the Latrobe Athletic Association, was considered the first professional football player. The Pro Football Hall of Fame soon discovered a 1892 expense accounting sheet prepared by Allegheny manager, O.D. Thompson, that included the line item: "Game performance bonus to W. Heffelfinger for playing (cash) $500."

Heffelfinger, who was working as a railroad clerk in Chicago, had earlier turned down an offer to play for the Pittsburgh Athletic Club for $250. This set off quite a controversy as Pittsburgh A.C. protested the presence of Heffelfinger and other Chicago Athletic Association players. Allegheny retaliated with the fact that Pittsburgh had imported players as well. The game was played at Recreation Park, which was located on Pittsburgh's North Side. A historical marker standing a few blocks from the site commemorates the game.

It later turned out that Heffelfinger received $500 plus $25 in expenses for the game, too much for a low-paid railroad clerk to pass up. Two of his Chicago teammates received "liberal" expense money. Thus, Pudge Heffelfinger now is acknowledged as the first known professional football player. The next week, Allegheny paid former Princeton tight end Ben "Sport" Donnelly $250 to play against Washington & Jefferson, but lost the game 8–0.

=== A professional football club ===
In 1893, Allegheny and Pittsburgh split two games, with Pittsburgh winning 6–0 at Exposition Park and Allegheny evening the score, 8–4, at Pittsburgh's field. That season Allegheny put Peter Wright, John Van Cleve, and Ollie Rafferty under contract for $50 per game for the season. When the team started slowly, Sport Donnelly was brought in as player-coach, becoming the first man to coach a known professional football team.

In 1894, Allegheny looked to be the stronger of the two teams. They defeated a team from Sewickley, 18–0, Indiana Normal 16–0, and the Carnegie Athletic Club 33–0. A three-game series between Pittsburgh and Allegheny would be played to determine the western Pennsylvania champions. In late October a game was scheduled between Allegheny and Pittsburgh. Nearly 2,000 tickets were sold in advance and the actual crowd at the Pittsburgh Athletic Club was estimated at 3,000. Pittsburgh won the first game of the three game series 6–4. The second game of the series was scheduled for November 6. Prior to the game, an unnamed Pittsburgh player offered the team's signals to Allegheny's Billy Kountz for $20. Allegheny reported the incident to Pittsburgh and the player was dealt with properly. Both team had hired ringers but this offense was considered blatant cheating and unacceptable. Allegheny would go on to win the second game and tie up the series. Just before Thanksgiving the third game was played and ended in a 30–4 Allegheny win. Ross Fiscus scored three touchdowns in the game. Allegheny was awarded a large trophy cup contributed by the Pittsburgh Chronicle Telegraph. Both clubs admitted to making a couple of thousand dollars on the game. The game's attendance was said to have numbered nearly 10,000 people.

=== AAU investigation ===
In September, 1895 the Allegheny found that it was under investigation by the Amateur Athletic Union for secretly paying its players. If the AAU discovered that the Allegheny had been paying players, it would declare the club professional, and no other team would dare play them and the club's membership would dramatically fall. Hoping to avoid punishment, Allegheny simply decided not to field a team in 1895.

=== First fully professional team ===
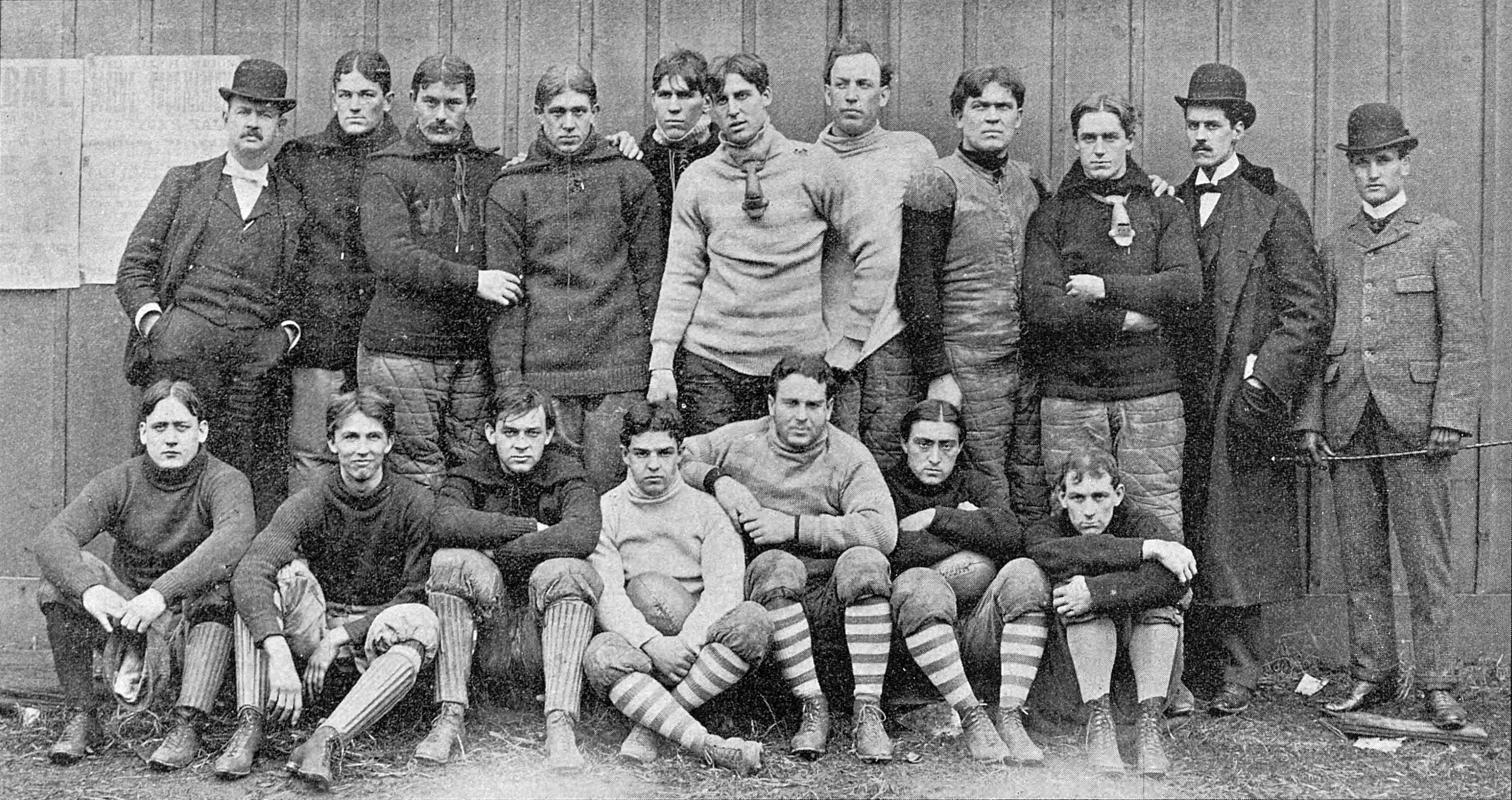
1896 "Three A's", credited as the first fully professional football team

For the 1896 season, the Allegheny organization fielded a completely professional team. However, by 1896, the Amateur Athletic Union (AAU), which discouraged professional play, began the process of suspending the Allegheny team for its flagrant violations of amateur rules. Knowing that it would soon be barred from competition by the AAU, the Allegheny Athletic Association defiantly emptied its treasury to import a team of all-stars, including Heffelfinger. The team, the first completely professional team, defeated the Pittsburgh Athletic Club and the Duquesne Country and Athletic Club on consecutive days, both games by shutouts. Then, after its abbreviated two game season, the pro football turmoil had upset the club so much that the sport was dropped.

== Season by season ==
Season	Won	Lost	Tied	Points for	Points against	Captain	Coach	Manager	Honors
1890	3	2	1	108	62	O. D. Thompson	none known	none known	local championship
1891	2	2	1	34	42	O. D. Thompson	none known	O. D. Thompson	-
1892	3	2	3	36	38	W. W. Blunt	none known	Bill Kountz	local championship
1893	4	3	0	82	18	Ollie Rafferty	Sport Donnelly	O. D. Thompson	-
1894	6	2	0	127	38	Anson Harrold	none known	Bill Kountz	local championship, Chronicle Telegraph cup
1896	2	0	0	30	0	Pudge Heffelfinger	none known	O. D. Thompson	Chronicle Telegraph cup (Note: In 1896, against a challenge from the Pittsburgh Athletic Club, the AAA successfully defended the Chronicle Telegraph cup it had won in the 1894 local championship series. However, the 1896 team's reliance on temporary, non-local players stood in the way of championship recognition for that year.)
