= O. D. Thompson =

American football player (1855–1925)

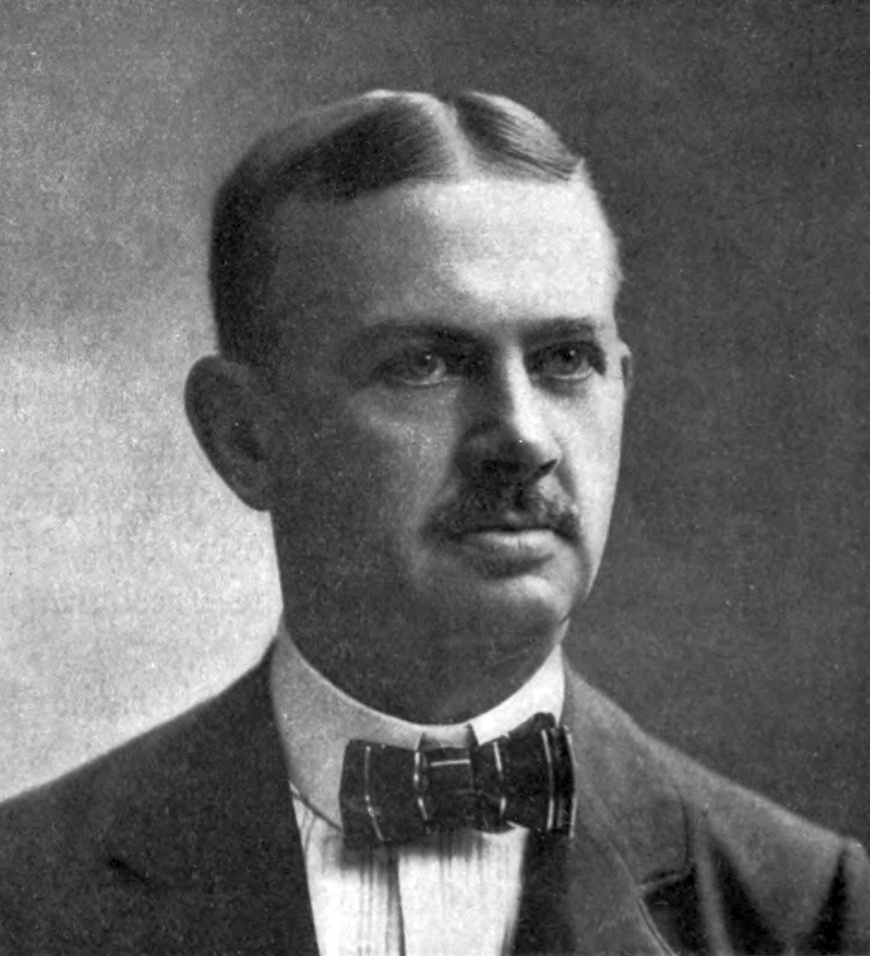

Profile
- Positions: Halfback, Fullback, Tackle

Personal information
- Born: September 24, 1855; Butler, Pennsylvania, U.S.
- Died: June 10, 1925 (aged 69); Edgeworth, Pennsylvania, U.S.

Career information
- College: Yale

Career history

Playing
- 1890–1891, 1893–1894: Allegheny Athletic Association

Manager
- 1891, 1893, 1896: Allegheny Athletic Association

Awards and highlights
- Helped Walter Camp develop football; Scored Yale's first touchdown against Harvard; Caught first allowed forward pass in history; threw/completed the second one; Signed the first known professional football player, Pudge Heffelfinger; Signed the first professional football coach, Sport Donnelly; Managed the first completely professional football team; 3x Pittsburgh local champion (1890, 1892, 1894)

Oliver David Thompson (September 24, 1855 – June 10, 1925) was an early football player at Yale, who played alongside Walter Camp. After his time at Yale, Thompson was a player and manager for the Allegheny Athletic Association. He is best known for paying Pudge Heffelfinger $500 to play for Allegheny against their rivals, the Pittsburgh Athletic Club—a move that made Heffelfinger the first known professional football player. Thompson's historic action went unnoticed until the 1960s, when a record of the payment was discovered on a page of a ledger prepared by Thompson. The page is currently on display at the Pro Football Hall of Fame in Canton, Ohio.

== Personal life and background ==
Thompson was born in Butler, Pennsylvania, the son of U.S. Congressman John McCandless Thompson and Anna Loretta (Campbell) Thompson. Oliver attended Phillips Andover Academy and then Yale College, from which he graduated in 1879. At Yale he was a four-year member of the varsity crew, football, and track teams, captaining the crew during his last two years; he was also a member of Delta Kappa Epsilon fraternity and the Skull and Bones society. After reading law in his father's office in Butler, he was admitted to the Allegheny County Bar in 1880 and from then until 1924 practiced law in Pittsburgh.

== Football at Yale ==
Thompson played the position of halfback alongside Walter Camp at Yale from 1876 through 1878. Before this, Camp had developed the current game of football from the sport, rugby. Since Thompson had worked with Camp for three years, this qualified him as the foremost gridiron authority in western Pennsylvania. In 1879, Thompson became the first Yale football player to score against Harvard.

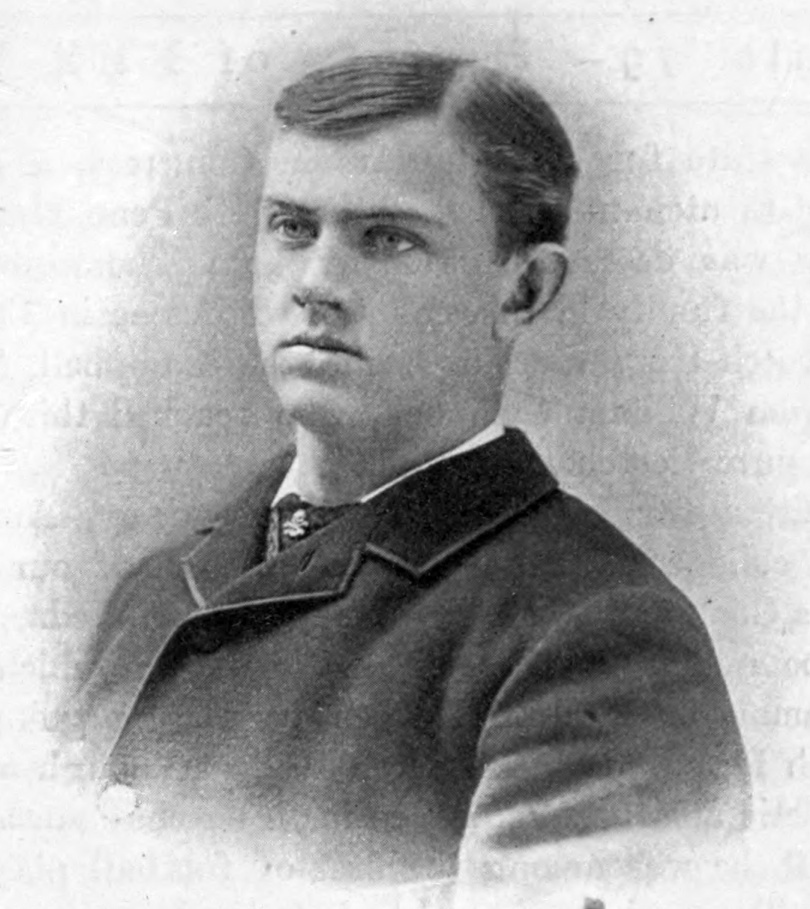
Yale College photograph of Thompson wearing a Skull and Bones pin, c. 1879

=== Forward pass ===
While at Yale, Thompson and Camp executed the first "legal" forward pass in football history. On November 30, 1876, Yale was playing Princeton in Hoboken, New Jersey. Early in the game, Camp ran for a good gain on a play, however when he was finally tackled, he threw the ball forward to Thompson, who ran for a touchdown. The Princeton players protested the play. Since the rules of football were still unclear in 1876, a coin toss was used by the referee to decide if the play stood. Yale won the toss and the touchdown stood. However, according to one of Yale's "special rules" that were agreed upon before the game by both teams, the touchdown didn't count in the scoring, however the point after did to give Yale a 1–0 lead. Later Thompson would also successfully threw the ball forward as he was being tackled. Princeton didn't bother to protest the play this time and Yale went on to win the game 2–0. The forward pass was then banned after that game. However, when the forward pass was legalized in 1906, Walter Camp opposed the idea.

After his graduation from Yale, Thompson continued to play football, or at least rugby, with great success throughout the 1880s.

== Allegheny ==
In 1890, Thompson and John Moorhead Jr. returned to their home, Pittsburgh, Pennsylvania, and formed the Allegheny club's football team. Since both men had played the sport at Yale, alongside Walter Camp, forming team wasn't too hard. The Allegheny A. A. took up football largely to give them a recruiting edge over the established Pittsburgh Athletic Club. Many Allegheny club members had gone to eastern colleges and played football. At that time athletic clubs and associations, ranging from the best with extensive facilities to local organizations with minimum meeting rooms, were in their prime as a source of fraternal fellowship for athletes.

In 1891, a bitter rivalry developed between the two clubs. Efforts were made by local media to schedule a game between the two clubs. However O. D. Thompson, Allegheny's manager, carefully avoided a game. He feared a one-sided loss to Pittsburgh because his team lacked the time needed to practice together that the East End team already had. Allegheny dropped to a 2–2–1 record, which forced Thompson's resignation as the manager and captain of the team. However Thompson was still very much active in the team's affairs in 1892. That season, Thompson wrote in his ledger that expenses of $75 were incurred for bringing Sport Donnelly, William C. Malley and Heffelfinger to play for Allegheny against the Pittsburgh Athletic Club. It was also at this same game that Heffelfinger was given $500 extra to play. Accusations then arose that Allegheny had paid Heffelfinger. However, they could not be proven until the discovery of Thompson's ledger, a half a century later. A week later Thompson's ledger shows that Allegheny paid Sport Donnelly $250 for playing against Washington & Jefferson. Thompson would finish the 1892 season in New York City, defending several Allegheny track and field players from Amateur Athletic Union charges of professionalism.

By 1893, Allegheny was once again under the full leadership of Thompson. That season, he scheduled some of the better known athletic clubs from around the nation. During a 28–0 victory against the Cleveland Athletic Club that season Thompson played tackle alongside Sport Donnelly.

A year later Thompson helped the Pittsburgh Athletic Club, by setting up an unnamed player who was trying to sell that team's play signals.

Thompson's final role with Allegheny was as manager of the 1896 team, which played only two games and won both. The 1896 squad has been credited by the Pro Football Hall of Fame and the Professional Football Researchers Association as the first completely professional football team.
