= Ben "Sport" Donnelly =

American football player and coach (1869–1922)

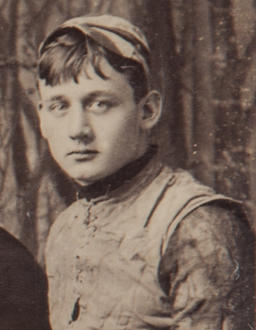
- Donnelly at Princeton

Profile
- Positions: End, tackle, guard, halfback

Personal information
- Born: October 18, 1869; Chicago, Illinois, U.S.
- Died: August 3, 1922 (aged 52); New York City, U.S.

Career information
- College: Princeton

Career history

Playing
- 1890–1891: Chicago All-University
- 1891–1892: Manhattan Athletic Club
- 1892–1893: Chicago Athletic Association
- 1892–1894: Allegheny Athletic Association
- 1893: Cleveland Athletic Club
- 1895: Seattle Athletic Club
- 1896: Chicago Athletic Association
- 1896: Allegheny Athletic Association

Coaching
- 1891–1892: Purdue (assistant)
- 1893: Iowa
- 1893: Allegheny Athletic Association
- 1893: Cleveland Athletic Club
- 1895: Illinois (assistant)
- 1895: Seattle Athletic Club
- 1896: Racine Athletic Association

Awards and highlights
- First-ever professional football coach; Second-ever professional football player; College head coaching record: 3–4

Benjamin Shenstone "Sport" Donnelley (commonly spelled Donnelly; (Note: His surname often appears as "Donnelly" in football-related publications and contemporary newspapers, but he signed it "Donnelley" on a passport application, matching the spelling used by his father and brothers and their companies R. R. Donnelley & Sons and R. H. Donnelley. "Donnelley" is also on his gravestone.) October 18, 1869 – August 3, 1922) was an American football player and coach. He was the second-known professional player in the sport's history, having been paid to play a game in 1892 for the Allegheny Athletic Association—just one week after the same team hired Pudge Heffelfinger for a game. In the next year Donnelly was hired by the Allegheny Athletic Association as player-coach, making him the first man to ever coach a known professional football team. A star end in his college days at Princeton, he went on to play for several athletic clubs during the 1890s and was reputed for his rough style of play and for antagonizing opposing players.

Donnelly served as the second head football coach at the University of Iowa, holding the post for two weeks to open the 1893 season; the team finished with a record of 3–4.

== College football playing career ==
Donnelly played his only year of college football at Princeton University. He was an end on the school's 1889 football team that was retroactively recognized as the year's national champion. He was named as a substitute on the first-ever All-America team in 1889; the top honors at the end position went to Yale's Amos Alonzo Stagg and Harvard's Arthur Cumnock. In the opinion of John Heisman, Donnelly was the best end in football that year.

== Club football career ==
After college, Donnelly returned to his hometown of Chicago, playing in 1890 for the Chicago All-University team alongside recent Princeton teammate Knowlton Ames. Donnelly played for the Manhattan Athletic Club for part of 1891, but returned to the All-University (at times called the Chicago University Club) team for its annual Thanksgiving game. In 1892, he became one of the original members of the Chicago Athletic Association football team organized by Billy Crawford around a core of former University Club players. He maintained ties with the Manhattan Athletic Club, playing at least twice for them in 1892.

Somewhat contrary to his nickname, Donnelly had a reputation for unsportsmanlike conduct on the field. Pudge Heffelfinger once said that Donnelly was the only man that he had played against who "could slug you and at the same time keep his eyes on the ball". One reported tactic involved deliberately striking an opponent and then alerting the referee to watch that player; when the opponent retaliated under the referee's observation, the player would be ejected. In a Chicago Athletic Association game against Brooklyn's Crescent Athletic Club in 1892, the Crescents refused to play unless Donnelly was excluded from the lineup, citing alleged rough tactics from his time with the Manhattan Athletic Club the previous year. Chicago agreed to bench Donnelly, causing him to quit the team in anger.

Shortly after his split from the Chicago Athletic Association, he and his recent Chicago teammates Pudge Heffelfinger and William C. Malley were enlisted by the Allegheny Athletic Association for a game on November 12, 1892 against Allegheny's main rival, the Pittsburgh Athletic Club. Heffelfinger was the only one of the three "ringers" who received payment ($500) for his play that day, but Donnelly became the second professional a week later when Allegheny paid him $250 for a game against Washington & Jefferson College. Donnelly rejoined Allegheny in 1893 as player-coach, and because the team then had at least three paid players on its roster, he has been credited as the first coach of a known professional football team. He would return again to Allegheny as a player in 1894 and 1896.

Donnelly was a frequent jumper from team to team. Just in 1893, he played for the Chicago Athletic Association in late August and September, coached Iowa in late September–early October, played again with Chicago on October 14, commenced as player-coach for the Allegheny Athletic Association in the following week, and after Allegheny's season was over in late November, coached and played two games for the Cleveland Athletic Club. He repeatedly switched positions as well during that time, taking turns at end, halfback, tackle, and guard.

Donnelly went to Seattle in 1895, where he coached and played for the Seattle Athletic Club. He drew a formal protest from the Port Townsend team, which contended that Donnelly, as an allegedly paid coach, should have been prohibited by amateur rules from playing.

In October 1896, Donnelly was splitting his time between coaching for the Racine Athletic Association of Wisconsin and playing for the Chicago AA. The Chicago Inter Ocean noted that he had gained a substantial amount of weight since his time at Princeton, but that even a "fat and out of condition" Donnelly was "a tower of strength to the C. A. A. line." At some point during the same season, Allegheny asked him if he and any of the Chicago players might be interested in playing for pay. The Alleghenys were then told that more than half of the Chicago players would be willing to come to Pittsburgh as soon as their team finished its traditional eastern tour. Donnelly himself took part in the second of the two games played by that season's Allegheny team, which has been called the first completely professional football team.

== College coaching career ==
In 1891, he was made an assistant coach at Purdue University by his friend and former Princeton teammate Knowlton Ames. Under Ames and Donnelly, Purdue would go 12–0 over the next two seasons. In 1891 while posting a 4–0 record, the team outscored its opponents 192–0. Then again in 1892, while posting an 8–0 record, the team outscored its opponents 320–24. Ames and Donnelly left the school in 1892.

Donnelly was the second-ever head football coach at the University of Iowa, serving only briefly to assemble and prepare the team for its 1893 season. He took charge of the Hawkeyes on September 28 and remained with them two weeks, during which they won their opening game against Coe College. Unlike his predecessor Edwin A. Dalton, Donnelly was generally disliked by the Hawkeye players.

Donnelly was an occasional guest coach at Princeton after his student days, finding time amid his busy football schedule to offer pointers to the current players, especially the ends.

In 1895 before heading west to join the Seattle Athletic Club, he briefly assisted George Huff in coaching the University of Illinois team.

== Trap shooting ==
Donnelly became an accomplished competitive trap shooter. At age 50, he traveled to Antwerp, Belgium as a member of the U.S. trap team at the 1920 Summer Olympics. Although initially named a participant in the Olympic team trap event and a reserve for the individual trap event, he was reported as a reserve when the team event began and is not recorded as having competed in either event. The American team dominated the competition, taking team gold and all three individual medals. Later in the same year, Donnelly won the Westy Hogan amateur trap shooting championship in Atlantic City, New Jersey, breaking 99 of 100 targets "in the face of a deceptive wind". He had previously won the same title in 1917 with a perfect score of 100 straight breaks.

== Life outside sports ==
Donnelly's father was Richard Robert Donnelley, who founded the R. R. Donnelley & Sons printing and publishing company. Older brothers Reuben H. Donnelley (founder of the R. H. Donnelley Company) and Thomas E. Donnelley were also prominent in the printing and publishing industry.

Donnelly was a friend of rail and coal heir Harry Kendall Thaw, who fatally shot the architect Stanford White, a former lover of Thaw's wife Evelyn Nesbit. Sport was played in a bit part by Ainslie Pryor in a 1955 movie based on the scandal, The Girl in the Red Velvet Swing.

Donnelly died in Manhattan on August 3, 1922, after a year's illness.

== Head coaching record ==
=== College ===
Year	Team	Overall	Conference	Standing	Bowl/playoffs
Iowa Hawkeyes (Western Interstate University Football Association) (1893)
1893	Iowa	3–4	1–2	T–3rd	
Iowa:		3–4	1–2		
Total:		3–4			
