= Pudge Heffelfinger =

American football player and coach (1867–1954)

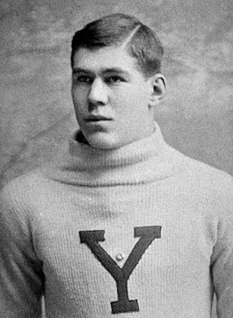
- Heffelfinger at Yale

Profile
- Position: Guard

Personal information
- Born: December 20, 1867; Minneapolis, Minnesota, U.S.
- Died: April 2, 1954 (aged 86); Blessing, Texas, U.S.
- Listed height: 6 ft 3 in (1.91 m)
- Listed weight: 195 lb (88 kg)

Career information
- College: Yale (1888–1891)

Career history

Playing
- Chicago Athletic Association (1892); Allegheny Athletic Association (1892)

Coaching
- California (1893) Head coach; Lehigh (1894) Head coach; Minnesota (1895) Head coach

Awards and highlights
- 3× Consensus All-American (1889–1891); Camp All-time All-America team; FWAA College Football All-Time team (1869–1919); W. Pennsylvania Circuit champion (1892); First recognized professional football player

Head coaching record
- Career: 17–13–1 (.565)
- College Football Hall of Fame

William Walter "Pudge" Heffelfinger (December 20, 1867 – April 2, 1954), also spelled Hafelfinger, was an American football player and coach. He is considered the greatest lineman of his time and the first athlete to play American football professionally, having been paid to play in 1892 for the Allegheny Athletic Association.

Heffelfinger played college football from 1888 to 1891 at Yale University, where he was a three-time consensus All-American as a guard. He served as the head football coach at the University of California in 1893, Lehigh University in 1894, and the University of Minnesota in 1895, compiling a career coaching record of 17–13–1. He was inducted into the College Football Hall of Fame as player with the inaugural class of 1951.

== Early life and education ==
Heffelfinger was born in 1867 in Minneapolis, Minnesota, to Christopher B. Heffelfinger and Mary Ellen Totton, both of whom were born in Pennsylvania. Heffelfinger's father came by riverboat to Minneapolis, eventually joining the Union Army at the outset of the Civil War. He was wounded at the Battle of Gettysburg. After the Civil War, he started the family shoe manufacturing business. During Heffelfinger's lifetime, the family rose to prominence in Minneapolis.

As a boy, Heffelfinger was nicknamed "Pudge". He played baseball and football at Minneapolis Central High School. Occasionally, during his junior and senior years of high school he also played both sports for the University of Minnesota, where he was a catcher in baseball and a halfback in football.

== Playing career ==
=== Yale ===
Heffelfinger, a three-time All-American, played for Walter Camp at Yale College in 1888, 1889, 1890, and 1891, graduating in 1892.

Heffelfinger originally planned to attend the University of Minnesota, but in May of his senior year in high school a local Yale alumnus who recognized his athletic talent convinced him to play for Yale instead and tutored him so he could pass the entrance exam. On Heffelfinger's first day of freshman practice in 1888, the captain of the varsity team, "Pa" Corbin, spotted him on the field and gave him a position on the varsity line. According to Corbin, during Heffelfinger's first year, in spite of his skill, the freshman from the Midwest was not sufficiently ferocious for the Yale style of play until Howard Knapp, one of the graduate coaches, motivated him by an unusual method:

The freshman Heffelfinger was 6 feet 3 inches in height, weighed 210 pounds and looked like the most demure, gentle, self-effacing individual that could be imagined. His usual posture was head bowed, shoulders stopped, eyes to the ground, with no idea whatever of his marvelous power and nature-given ability to strike terror in his opponents.

Knapp did everything possible by word and deed to arouse Heff so that he would give all he had in him for the good of the Yale team. Finally, at his wits end, Howard decided he would try the sight of blood to stir up Heff's dormant bellicose spirit.

He wrote Heff, with pen dipped in blood which be had obtained from a slaughter house, one of the sharpest, strongest of letters, using every reasonable form of expression to get Heff out of his lethargy. Heff, not knowing the nature of the gore, certainly must have been stirred, for the week after receiving the letter he played the best game of the season against Princeton.

Heff found himself that day and from then on was a terror to his opponents.

— William Herbert "Pa" Corbin, Reference

The 1888 Yale team was not only undefeated and untied, but unscored upon, with a season scoring record of 698 to 0.

During Heffelfinger's four years playing for Yale under Camp, the team lost only two games. His teammates included, besides Pa Corbin: Alonzo Stagg, Charley Gill, Billy Rhodes, Lee "Bum" McClung, and George Washington Woodruff. Heffelfinger felt that the greatest of these teams was the undefeated 1891 team he played on in his senior year, which he described as "one of the best balanced teams I ever saw."

Heffelfinger's athletic activities at Yale were not limited to football: he lettered in three other sports: rowing, baseball, and track, and won the university heavyweight boxing championship.

=== First professional football player ===
After leaving Yale, Heffelfinger played amateur football for the Chicago Athletic Association (for which he was compensated with "double expenses", as was a common practice at the time). He was widely considered the best player at the time. Meanwhile, two Pittsburgh teams, the Allegheny Athletic Association (nicknamed the 3As) and the Pittsburgh Athletic Club had a heated rivalry and both were looking for an advantage in their upcoming game. Pittsburgh A.C. offered him $250 (equivalent to $8,958 in 2025) to play for them in the game, but he felt the amount was not enough to jeopardize his amateur status. The 3As doubled the amount and on the day of the game, Heffelfinger and two of his Chicago teammates were playing for the 3As. The game was played at Recreation Park in the city of Allegheny, now the North Side of Pittsburgh. A historical marker standing a few blocks from the site commemorates the game.

Although the payment for Heffelfinger's play was not published or admitted at the time, his presence set off quite a controversy as the Pittsburgh A.C. protested the presence of the Chicago Athletic Association players in their line-up. Allegheny retaliated with the fact that Pittsburgh had imported players as well. The game ended in a 4–0 Allegheny win. Heffelfinger scored the game's only touchdown on a recovered fumble. A touchdown was only worth four points at the time.

In the 1960s a man known only as "Nelson Ross" walked into the office of Art Rooney, the president of the Pittsburgh Steelers of the National Football League. After a brief discussion, the man gave Rooney a typed, 49-page manuscript about the early history of pro football. Ross' examination of Pittsburgh newspapers indicated that the first pro American football player actually was Pudge Heffelfinger, an all-American guard from Yale, who was hired to play for Allegheny on November 12, 1892, for $500 (equivalent to $17,917 in 2025). The Pro Football Hall of Fame soon discovered a page torn from an 1892 account ledger prepared by Allegheny manager, O. D. Thompson, that included the line item: "Game performance bonus to W. Heffelfinger for playing (cash) $500." Though the payment was not verified until the acquisition of an Allegheny Athletic Association expense ledger from the day by the Pro Football Hall of Fame, this fee established Heffelfinger as being the first professional American football player on record.

== Coaching career ==
=== California ===
Heffelfinger took his first head football coaching job with the University of California, Berkeley for the 1893 football season and was the third person to be assigned to the post. His team achieved a record of 5–1–1.

=== Lehigh ===
Heffelfinger was the third head football coach for Lehigh University in Bethlehem, Pennsylvania, and he held that position for the 1894 season. His overall coaching record at Lehigh was 5 wins and 9 losses.

=== Minnesota ===
Heffelfinger also coached the University of Minnesota football team in 1895. He led the team to a 7–3 record in his only season there. Highlights included victories over rivals University of Wisconsin–Madison and University of Chicago, outscoring their opponents 136 to 58 for the season.

== Later life ==
Heffelfinger married Grace Harriet Pierce in 1901. The couple remained married until his death in 1954. After his official coaching career ended, Heffelfinger immersed himself in the business world in Minneapolis. He joined the family shoe manufacturing business. The business suffered heavily in the Panic of 1907 and was forced into bankruptcy in 1910, as were Heffelfinger and his father.

After the failure of the manufacturing business, Heffelfinger had an active career in real estate, including major commercial deals. In his real estate work, Heffelfinger is credited with important contributions to the early development of the upper Nicollet Avenue area, with organizing the company which built the 1910 Physicians and Surgeons building, and with bringing Butler Brothers to Minneapolis.

Heffelfinger was a delegate to the Republican National Convention in 1904 and 1908. He first won elective office in 1924, running against more experienced politicians and easily capturing a seat on the Hennepin County Board of Commissioners. During his first election campaign, Heffelfinger competed energetically and compared politics to football, telling a reporter he would reduce taxes "if I make a touchdown in this political game, which I'll admit is tougher than football, a whole lot." Heffelfinger continued to serve on the Hennepin County Board for 24 years, including four years as board chairman. During Prohibition, Heffelfinger ran twice as a "wet" in the Republican primary for Minnesota's 5th congressional district, losing both times to prohibitionist and former Lieutenant Governor William I. Nolan.

Throughout his life, Heffelfinger, maintained a high level of involvement with football. After his professional coaching career ended, he continued for decades to make yearly trips to New Haven to assist the coaching staff. Into his fifties, Heffelfinger not only coached the Bulldogs from the sideline, but scrimmaged with them on the field, showing remarkable toughness. He also played competitively in charity and exhibition games against much younger men, playing his last game at age 65. From 1935 to 1950, Heffelfinger edited Heffelfinger's Football Facts, a yearly booklet featuring history, rules, statistics, and professional and college schedules for the upcoming season.

Heffelfinger died in Texas on April 2, 1954.

== Hall of Fame ==
Heffelfinger was inducted into the College Football Hall of Fame in 1951.

In 1969, in honor of the centennial of collegiate football, the Football Writers Association of America named two "College Football All-Time Teams" of eleven players — an "early" team consisting of players who played prior to 1920, and a "modern" team who played in 1920 and after. Heffelfinger was chosen as one of two guards on the pre-1920 squad.

Despite being one of the earliest pioneers for the professional game, he has still yet to be inducted into the Pro Football Hall of Fame. However, he was inducted into the Pittsburgh Pro Football Hall of Fame in 2015. He was named one of the 10 inaugural members for the Football Learning Academy's Hall of Honor in 2022, which looks to acknowledge icons not currently inducted in the hall.

== Head coaching record ==
Year	Team	Overall	Conference	Standing	Bowl/playoffs
California Golden Bears (Independent) (1893)
1893	California	5–1–1			
California:		5–1–1			
Lehigh (Independent) (1894)
1894	Lehigh	5–9			
Lehigh:		5–9			
Minnesota Golden Gophers (Independent) (1895)
1895	Minnesota	7–3			
Minnesota:		7–3			
Total:		17–13–1			
