= Art Poe =

American football player (1879–1951)

Arthur Poe
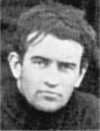

Profile
- Position: End

Personal information
- Born: March 22, 1879; Baltimore, Maryland, U.S.
- Died: April 15, 1951 (aged 72); Cedar Rapids, Iowa, U.S.

Career information
- College: Princeton

Career history
- 1900–1901: Homestead Library & Athletic Club
- 1902: Pittsburgh Stars

Awards and highlights
- Consensus All-American (1899); Second-team All-American (1898); 2x W. Pennsylvania Champ (1900, 1901); NFL champion (1902)
- College Football Hall of Fame

Arthur Poe (March 22, 1879 – April 15, 1951) was an American football player and businessman, and one of six celebrated Poe brothers—second cousins, twice removed, of American author Edgar Allan Poe—to play football at Princeton in the late 19th and early 20th century. He was selected retroactively by the Helms Athletic Foundation as the national college football player of the year for 1899, and was elected to the College Football Hall of Fame in 1969.

== College career ==
Poe attended Princeton University, and was named to Walter Camp's All-American football second team in 1898 and first team in 1899. He was one of the Poe Brothers, six celebrated American football players – second cousins, twice removed of American author Edgar Allan Poe – to play football at Princeton in the late 19th and early 20th century. Arthur made the plays that led to victories over Yale in 1898 and 1899. In 1898 he took the ball from a Yale runner's grasp and raced 100 yards for the game's only score. This feat, done while Poe had a bad knee, was known as "Poe's Run." Remarkably, he almost repeated the feat in the game's second half when he ran 90 yards with a Yale fumble for an apparent touchdown before the ball was ruled down where it had been recovered.

In 1899, Poe volunteered to attempt a game-winning field goal with only 30 seconds to play. Poe, despite never having before kicked in a game, volunteered to kick because both of Princeton's kickers had left the game due to injury. His kick was good and brought about an 11–10 Princeton victory over Yale. In 1914, a Pittsburgh Press article declared the last-minute winning field goal "Football's Greatest Moment." Both his winning run in 1898 and kick against the Elis in 1899 were celebrated in comic, quasi-epic poems by fellow Princeton grad M'Cready Sykes in a book entitled "Poe's Run and Other Poems." Of Poe's long touchdown run to beat Yale 6-0 in 1898, Sykes penned:

"Hys eyes on ye dystante Goale; He lookes behynde him not, but from ye Scripture learned in Youthe Rememberethe Mrs. Lot.

"Ye Elis tears in fierce Pursuite; But Poe eludes yem alle; He rushes 'twixt ye quyverrynge Postes, & sytteth on ye Balle."

Poe's stardom on the gridiron as a junior and senior at Princeton was the result of a remarkable comeback from a severe leg injury suffered during his freshman year, after which doctors doubted that he would ever play football again. At only 5-7 and 146 pounds, he was a standout on the defensive line, and in addition to his heroics in Yale games had an 80-yard touchdown run to beat Navy and a 40-yard run to help defeat Brown in his junior season. In addition to excelling at football, Arthur was the top wrestler during his time at Princeton and was voted the most popular man in his class. Dartmouth star Fred Crolius, who played with Poe on the Homestead Library & Athletic Club team after they had both left college, described Poe's grit as an undersized football star. "Arthur Poe was about as game a man as the football world ever saw" said Crolius. "He was handicapped in his playing by a knee which would easily slip out of place. We men who played with him on the Homestead team were often stopped after Arthur had made a magnificent tackle and had broken up heavy interference, with this quiet request: 'Pull my bum knee back into place.' After this was done, he would jump up and no one would ever know that it had been out. This man, who perhaps was the smallest man playing at that time, was absolutely unprotected. His suit consisted of a pair of shoes, stockings, unpadded pants, jersey and one elastic knee bandage."

== Professional career ==
In 1900 and 1901, Poe played for the Homestead Library & Athletic Club as the team won the mythical professional football championship both years. In 1902, he joined many of his former Homestead players in the first National Football League as a member of the Pittsburgh Stars. The Stars would go on to win the league title that year.

== Later life ==
After graduating from Princeton in 1900, Poe married Anne Emerson King in 1904. They moved to Cedar Rapids, Iowa, where he would become the assistant plant manager and then the plant manager for the Quaker Oats Company. As a civic leader in Cedar Rapids, he served as director of the Red Cross; chairman of all Liberty Loan drives; president of the Princeton alumni class of 1900; president of the Cedar Rapids Chamber of Commerce; president of the Coe College Board of Trustees; vice president of St. Luke's Hospital; a member of the International Board of Directors of the Y.M.C.A.; trustee of the School of Religion at the University of Iowa; chairman of the Ways and Means Committee of the Diocese of Iowa and trustee of Iowa Episcopate Funds; and vice president of the Morris Plan Bank.

He was honored after his death in 1951 by the Quaker Oats Co., who erected a non-denominational chapel on the Coe College campus, the Poe Chapel, in his memory.
