= J. A. Gammons =

American baseball player (1876-1963)

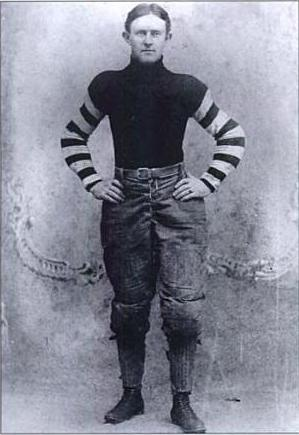
- Gammons during his playing career at Brown

Biographical details
- Born: March 17, 1876; New Bedford, Massachusetts, U.S.
- Died: March 24, 1963 (aged 87); East Greenwich, Rhode Island, U.S.

Playing career

Football
- 1895–1897: Brown
- 1898–1899: Duquesne C. & A.C.
- 1900–1901: Homestead A.C.
- 1902: Pittsburgh Stars

Baseball
- 1901: Boston Beaneaters
- Positions: Halfback (football), Outfielder (baseball)

Coaching career (HC unless noted)

Football
- 1902: Brown
- 1908–1909: Brown

Baseball
- 1901–1903: Brown

Head coaching record
- Overall: 17–10–2 (football)

John Ashley "Daff" Gammons (March 17, 1876 – March 24, 1963) was an American baseball and football player, college football and baseball coach, amateur golfer, and insurance agent. He played professional baseball for one season, 1901, for the Boston Beaneaters. Gammons served as the head football coach at Brown University in 1902, 1908, and 1909, and as its head baseball coach from 1901 to 1903.

== Early life ==
Gammons was born on March 17, 1876, in New Bedford, Massachusetts. He attended Brown University, where he earned letters in football from 1895 to 1897, and baseball, including on the 1896 national championship team. He graduated from Brown in 1898, and then attended Harvard University in 1899 and 1900.

== Professional career ==
After college, Gammons embarked upon a professional career in the insurance business. In 1901, he founded his own insurance company, John A. Gammons, Inc. (later Gammons & Son), in Providence, Rhode Island, which still remained in business more than one hundred years later. One source considered Gammons to be "one of the leading insurance agents of Providence".

Gammons also continued his playing career in both football and baseball. In 1898 and 1899, Gammons played football for the Duquesne Country and Athletic Club. At the end of Duquesne's 1898 season, he ran 60 yards on a punt return for a score against the Western Pennsylvania All-Star football team. He played football for the Homestead Library & Athletic Club in 1900 and 1901, followed by the Pittsburgh Stars of the 1902 National Football League. Gammons played semiprofessional baseball from 1898 to 1900 with clubs in Attleboro and North Attleboro, Massachusetts. In 1901, Gammons was approached by two professional teams: the Milwaukee Brewers of the American League and the Boston Beaneaters of the National League. He was hesitant to play professionally, because he wished to focus on his newly founded insurance business, but eventually signed with the Beaneaters. Gammons played with Boston for one season.

Gammons also coached the Brown baseball team from 1901 to 1903. In 1902, his coaching duties were expanded to include that of head coach of the football team. Brown compiled a 5–4–1 record that season. Gammons later returned to that position in 1908 and 1909, in which the football teams compiled records of 5–3–1 and 7–3, respectively.

In 1917, Gammons led a group of investors which purchased the Providence Grays baseball team of the International League. He was named the club's president, but resigned that post in 1918 when he was appointed to the advisory committee of the Bureau of Mines during World War I.

Gammons was also a skilled amateur golfer. A contemporary source called him "one of New England's best golfers." He won the 1924 Rhode Island Amateur Championship, in which he had previously finished as runner-up in 1919 and 1920.

Gammons died in East Greenwich, Rhode Island, on March 24, 1963. He was inducted into the inaugural class of the Brown University Athletic Hall of Fame in 1971.

== Head coaching record ==
=== Football ===
Year	Team	Overall	Conference	Standing	Bowl/playoffs
Brown Bears (Independent) (1902)
1902	Brown	5–4–1			
Brown Bears (Independent) (1908–1909)
1908	Brown	5–3–1			
1909	Brown	7–3			
Brown:		17–10–2			
Total:		17–10–2			

== See also ==
- List of college football head coaches with non-consecutive tenure
