= Willis Richardson (American football) =

American football player and coach

Profile
- Positions: Quarterback, Head coach

Career information
- College: Brown

Career history

Playing
- 1900–1901: Homestead Library & Athletic Club
- 1902: Pittsburgh Stars

Coaching
- 1900–1901: Homestead Library & Athletic Club
- 1902: Pittsburgh Stars

Awards and highlights
- 2× W. Pennsylvania champion (1900, 1901); National Football League champion (1902); 2× Second-team All-American (1898, 1899); Kicked Brown’s first ever field goal (1898); Brown University Football Hall of Fame (1970)

Willis Richardson was an American professional American football player-coach for the Homestead Library & Athletic Club and the Pittsburgh Stars of the first National Football League (NFL). He won the Western Pennsylvania State Championship with Homestead in 1900 and 1901. Then in 1902, he brought along many former Homestead players to the Stars team, which was formed by the former Latrobe Athletic Association manager, Dave Berry, and probably funded by the Barney Dreyfuss and William Chase Temple of the Pittsburgh Pirates baseball team. During the Stars "championship game" against the Philadelphia Athletics, Willis scored an extra point to help lead the Stars to an 11–0 victory and the 1902 championship.

Prior to playing professionally, Richardson played at the college level for Brown University. While at Brown he was a two-time All-American on Walter Camps second team. He is best known as the player who kicked Brown’s first ever field goal in 1899. In 1898 he earned his first All-American status by running 103 yards for a touchdown against Princeton.

In 1971 Willis was inducted into the Brown University Football Hall of Fame.
