= Artie Miller =

Artie (Hart) Miller
Profile
- Position: Halfback

Career information
- College: Carlisle

Career history
- 1900–1901: Homestead Library & Athletic Club
- 1902: Pittsburgh Stars

Awards and highlights
- 2x W. Pennsylvania Pro Champs (1900, 1901); NFL Champion (1902)

Artie “Hart” Miller was an early professional American football player for the Homestead Library & Athletic Club in 1900 and 1901, as well as the Pittsburgh Stars of the first National Football League. He played the position of halfback. Before the start of the 1902 season, Miller was working as a lumberjack in Wisconsin.

Prior to playing professionally, Miller attended and played football at, the Carlisle Indian School. According to school records, Miller arrived at the school in 1891 and graduated in 1900. By 1910, he was living Gresham, Wisconsin, working in a saw mill and still playing football.
