= Hawley Pierce =

American football player and coach

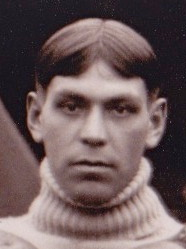
- Pierce with the Homestead Library & Athletic Club in 1901

Profile
- Position: Tackle

Personal information
- Born: c. 1874; Cattaraugus Reservation, Erie County, New York
- Died: December 6, 1969; Gowanda, New York
- Listed height: 6 ft 2 in (1.88 m)
- Listed weight: 200 lb (91 kg)

Career information
- College: Carlisle Indian School

Career history
- 1901: Homestead Library & Athletic Club
- 1902: Philadelphia Athletics
- 1902–1903: All-Syracuse

Hawley Pierce (c. 1874 – December 6, 1969) was an early professional football player for the Philadelphia Athletics of the first National Football League and later for the Syracuse Athletic Club during the 1902 and 1903 World Series of Football. In 1901, he began his professional career playing on the 1901 Homestead Library & Athletic Club football team. Prior to his professional career, Pierce, a Seneca Native American, played for the Carlisle Indian School, located in Carlisle, Pennsylvania. He was the brother of college and professional football's Bemus Pierce.

== Role in development of the overhead spiral forward pass ==
Howard Reiter, a teammate of Pierce during his time with football's Philadelphia Athletics, claimed to have invented the overhead spiral forward pass while playing professional football as a player-coach for the team in the 1902 National Football League. Pierce reportedly taught Reiter to throw an underhand spiral pass, but Reiter had short arms and was unable to throw for distance from an underhand delivery. Accordingly, Reiter began working on an overhand spiral pass. Reiter recalled trying to imitate the motion of a baseball catcher throwing to second base. After practice and experimentation, Reiter "discovered he could get greater distance and accuracy throwing that way."

== World Series of Football ==
Prior to the start of the series, Syracuse A.C. under Cornell University coach, Frank "Buck" O'Neill, signed three running backs from the Watertown Red & Black, along with Hawley and his brother Bemus. He also signed Bill Warner and his brother Glenn. O'Neill conducted daily practices in preparation for the series.

Syracuse defeated the heavily favored "New York team" in what has been called the first indoor pro football game. The final score of the game was recorded as 6–0, but in reality it was 5–0, since touchdowns only counted for five points in 1902 and Pop Warner missed the extra point. The finale on New Year's night against the Orange Athletic Club resulted in another 36–0 win, and the series championship, for Pierce and Syracuse.

Pierce played for Syracuse again in the 1903 World Series of Football.
