= Pittsburgh Stars =

American football team (1902)

Logo

General information
- Founded: 1902
- Folded: 1902
- Stadium: Pittsburgh Coliseum
- Headquartered: Allegheny, Pennsylvania, United States; Greensburg, Pennsylvania, United States
- Colors: Scarlet, White

Personnel
- Owners: William Chase Temple & Barney Dreyfuss (Both men suspected, but never proven)
- General manager: Dave Berry
- Head coach: Willis Richardson

Team history
- Pittsburgh Stars (1902)

League / conference affiliations
- National Football League (1902)

Championships
- League championships: 1 (1902)

The Pittsburgh (or Pittsburg) Stars were a professional American football team based in Pittsburgh, Pennsylvania in 1902. The team was a member of the first National Football League, which has no connection with the modern National Football League. The league was a curious mixture of baseball and football, with two of the three teams (Philadelphia Athletics and Philadelphia Phillies) sponsored by the major league baseball teams of the same names, and the Pittsburgh team suspected of being secretly financed by baseball's Pittsburgh Pirates. The Stars were managed by Dave Berry, previously the manager of the Latrobe Athletic Association professional football team.

The Stars won the league championship in the league's only season of existence.

== History ==
=== Team origin ===
Pittsburgh Stars manager David Berry, who also served as the league president

The Stars, and the league, began as a part of the baseball wars between the National League and the newly formed American League, which began in 1901. Across the state in Philadelphia, two major league teams fought for control of the city's baseball market. These teams were the Athletics, which were represented in the American League and the Phillies of the National League. The interleague fighting began when the Athletics lured several of the Phillies' players from their contracts, only to lose them again through court actions.

In 1902, Phillies owner John Rogers decided to start a football team, he therefore took control of the "Philadelphia Football Club" team and renamed them the Philadelphia Phillies. The Athletics owner, Ben Shibe, followed suit and fielded, named a team named Philadelphia Athletics, which was made-up of several baseball players as well as some local football players. He appointed his baseball manager Connie Mack as the team's general manager and named former Penn player, Charles "Blondy" Wallace as the team's coach; however, both Rogers and Shibe knew that in order to lay claim to a "World Championship", they needed to have a team from Pittsburgh, which was the focal point of football at the time, in the new league. They called on pro football promoter Dave Berry, the former manager of football's first fully professional team, the Latrobe Athletic Association, to raise a Pittsburgh-based team for the two Philadelphia teams to face. Berry met with the two Philadelphia owners and agreed to establish a team. Due to the animosity between Rodgers and Shibe, Berry was then elected as league president.

=== Fielding the team ===
Berry constructed his team from many of the key players that played for the Homestead Library & Athletic Club, on their professional football championship teams in 1900 and 1901. He then became the team's owner and manager; however, Berry's modest income showed that he couldn't possibly have the money to cover the salaries of the top pros the team employed, all by himself. Suspicion fell on William Chase Temple, the steelman who'd formerly backed both the Duquesne Country and Athletic Club and the Homestead Library & Athletic Club and who was still an officer with the Pirates, and Barney Dreyfuss, the Pirates' owner. Both denied any connection to the team's finances (Temple's denial was plausible given that he had failed to stem the Duquesne club's decline), and Berry insisted he was the team's sole owner, a claim treated with skepticism both at the time and as late as 1980. Whoever was helping Berry fund the Stars remains unknown.

Regardless of who the team's owner was, Berry still made all the management decisions. And right away he alienated many potential fans in Pittsburgh when he decided to have his team train in Greensburg, 40 miles away. Berry stated that Greensburg's Natatorium provided better facilities than what could be found in Pittsburgh, but the public outrage continued. Even the benefits of breathing Greensburg's clear, country air failed to impress Pittsburghers who were used to constantly breathing highly polluted air in city during the early 1900s. Wrote one historian: "As far as the fans were concerned, Berry had deserted Pittsburgh and deprived them of the fun of watching practices for free." Berry then added another error by announcing that his team would play a couple of games in Greensburg, coming to Pittsburgh itself only for "big-money" games. As a result, the Pittsburgh Press took to calling them "the Greensburg team".

Berry did build a top-notch team, however; as a player-coach he hired a former Brown University All-American, Willis Richardson at quarterback. Richardson had quarterbacked the Homestead Library & Athletic Club in 1901. Having Richardson and the team's coach and quarterback, helped gain the respect of other former Homestead players, many of whom signed up immediately. The number of players, who were considered the stars of football during the early 1900s, led to the team being named "The Stars". However, like the Athletics and Phillies, the Stars had a few baseball players in their line-up. New York Giants pitcher Christy Mathewson became the team's fullback. He, along with Pittsburgh's Honus Wagner, would be one of the first five inductees into the Baseball Hall of Fame. Also Fred Crolius, who played several games for the Pirates' in 1902, lined-up in the Stars backfield.

With all the baseball involvement, training didn't get underway for the football teams until September 29, 1902 with the season was scheduled to open a week later on October 4. However, most of the players were already in shape. Besides the baseball players, many of the others had jobs that kept them in good condition. For example, Pittsburgh halfback Artie Miller joined the team after working as a lumberjack in Wisconsin that summer. To make the preseason even less stressful, the average football team in 1902 only used about six plays which were all standard.

=== 1902 season ===
The league played all of its games on Saturdays, since there were no Sunday sports events, in 1902, according to Pennsylvania's blue laws. The Stars played their home games at the Pittsburgh Coliseum, which was owned by William Chase Temple. However, he continued to deny he had any part in the Stars. Meanwhile, those individuals who suspected Dreyfuss as being one of the team's backers, were surprised that the team hadn't scheduled its games at Exposition Park, the Pirates' home.

The Stars first game, played at the Pittsburgh Coliseum was rained out. The Stars played many independent teams as well as the two Philadelphia teams that made up the NFL. The very next week, the Stars defeated the Pennsylvania Railroad Y.M.C.A. 30–0. In 1902, a regulation football field was 110 yards long with the midpoint falling at the 55-yard line. This size is still used in the Canadian Football League today. Because the Coliseum had been formatted for bicycle racing with a wooden track that completely encircled the field and cut off the ends, the Stars played on an "undersized" 100-yard field.

As the season progressed, Pittsburghers began to take interest in the Stars. In their first six games, they gave up no touchdowns. Meanwhile, the team never scored fewer than three touchdowns in any game. Sometimes they played local semi-pros like the Cottage and East End Athletic Clubs, while sometimes they played colleges, which was not uncommon in this era. The Stars won their game against Bucknell, Christy Mathewson's alma mater 24–0. Finally on November 4, in front of nearly 4,000 fans, the Stars beat the Philadelphia Phillies, 18–0 at the Coliseum.

However, the team's fortunes took a hit when Mathewson disappeared from the team. Some historians speculate that the Giants discovered that their star pitcher was risking his baseball career with the Stars and ordered him to stop. While other historians feel that coach Richardson got rid of Mathewson because he felt that since the fullback's punting skills were hardly used, he could replace him with former Harvard player Shirley Ellis. However, while Ellis was a strong runner who was hard to knock down, he lacked Mathewson's punting skills. That factor cost Pittsburgh a game when the Stars went to Philadelphia to play against the Athletics. In the first half, Pittsburgh scored two touchdowns but failed to cash either extra point. The Athletics also got a touchdown and added the point. Up until 1912, a touchdown counted for only five points, so the score at the half stood 10–6. In the second half, the Athletics added a field goal to the score, which also counted as five points in 1902. Under modern scoring, the game would have been a 12–10 Pittsburgh victory. However, in 1902 scoring rules, the game ended in an 11–10 Philadelphia victory. If the Stars had scored either extra point, they could have avoided defeat.

Local fans were shocked at the Stars' loss. It was unheard of that a champion Pittsburgh pro team should ever lose. However, just two weeks later, the Stars went back to Philadelphia and lost to the Phillies, 11–0. Berry needed to book a Thanksgiving Day football game, which usually drew many fans. After a game against Washington & Jefferson team fell through, Berry guaranteed Connie Mack $2,000 if the Athletics would come to Pittsburgh and play the Stars. Berry billed a game between the Stars and the Athletics as being for the championship of the National Football League. The Athletics had split on the season with the Phillies, as had Pittsburgh. However, the team did defeat Pittsburgh 11–10 earlier in the season. A Philadelphia victory on Thanksgiving would give the A's the championship, but a win by the Stars would tie the race for the league title tighter. Mack agreed to the game; however, he refused to play until his team was paid their guarantee of $2,000. With attendance at around 1,800 fans, it looked as if the game wouldn't be played. However, Mack soon after received a check for $2,000 from William Corey, the head of Carnegie Steel who impatiently wanted to see the game. The Athletics and Stars played to a scoreless tie, meaning that Dave Berry's "championship game" hadn't decided anything.

==== 1902 championship ====
Another championship game was soon planned to take place two days later by Berry and Mack. But due to a lack of funds Berry almost ended up cancelling the game. He met with his players and explained that he couldn't pay them because William Temple had all of the team's money. However, he promised the players that they would all share equally in Saturday's game, which would be a sell-out. After some complaints were addressed, the players reluctantly agreed. The crowd in Pittsburgh was a little better on Saturday, but not by much. About 2,000 fans showed up, and the Pittsburgh players knew before the game began that the gate receipts were going to come up shorter than what was promised. The game looked like it might once again end in a tie. However, a late touchdown by Shirley Ellis and another by Artie Miller led Pittsburgh to an 11–0 win over the Athletics.

However, the Athletics players decided to call the Stars' win an exhibition, and declared themselves the champs. The team had agreed to that season-ending championship game against Pittsburgh two days after Thanksgiving, and they had lost it. This was recognized by all parties at the time as the championship game. Each team also carried a record of 2–2 for league play. However, Pittsburgh had, by far, the best point ratio, scoring 39 points to their opponents' 22. Both the Athletics and the Phillies gave up more points than they scored in their league games. Finally, Dave Berry used his power as league president to name his Stars the 1902 champions.

=== Legacy ===
Not many fans noticed the championship win. The Pittsburgh players were too busy suing William Temple for money that was owed to them for their Thanksgiving Day game to celebrate their victory, and the story disappeared from the newspapers before the suit was settled. In 1903 the war between American and National Leagues ended and the baseball-sponsored football teams disappeared, leaving many of the best pro players without teams. Most of the players played again with other teams such as the Franklin Athletic Club, the Canton Bulldogs and the Massillon Tigers over the next few years. The Philadelphia Athletics went home and defeated the Phillies to wrap up second place. The win gave them only the city championship since the season was won by Pittsburgh the week before. The Stars' did mark the end of Pittsburgh glory years as the cradle of pro football.
