= 1899 Homestead Library & Athletic Club season =

1899 Homestead Library & Athletic Club football
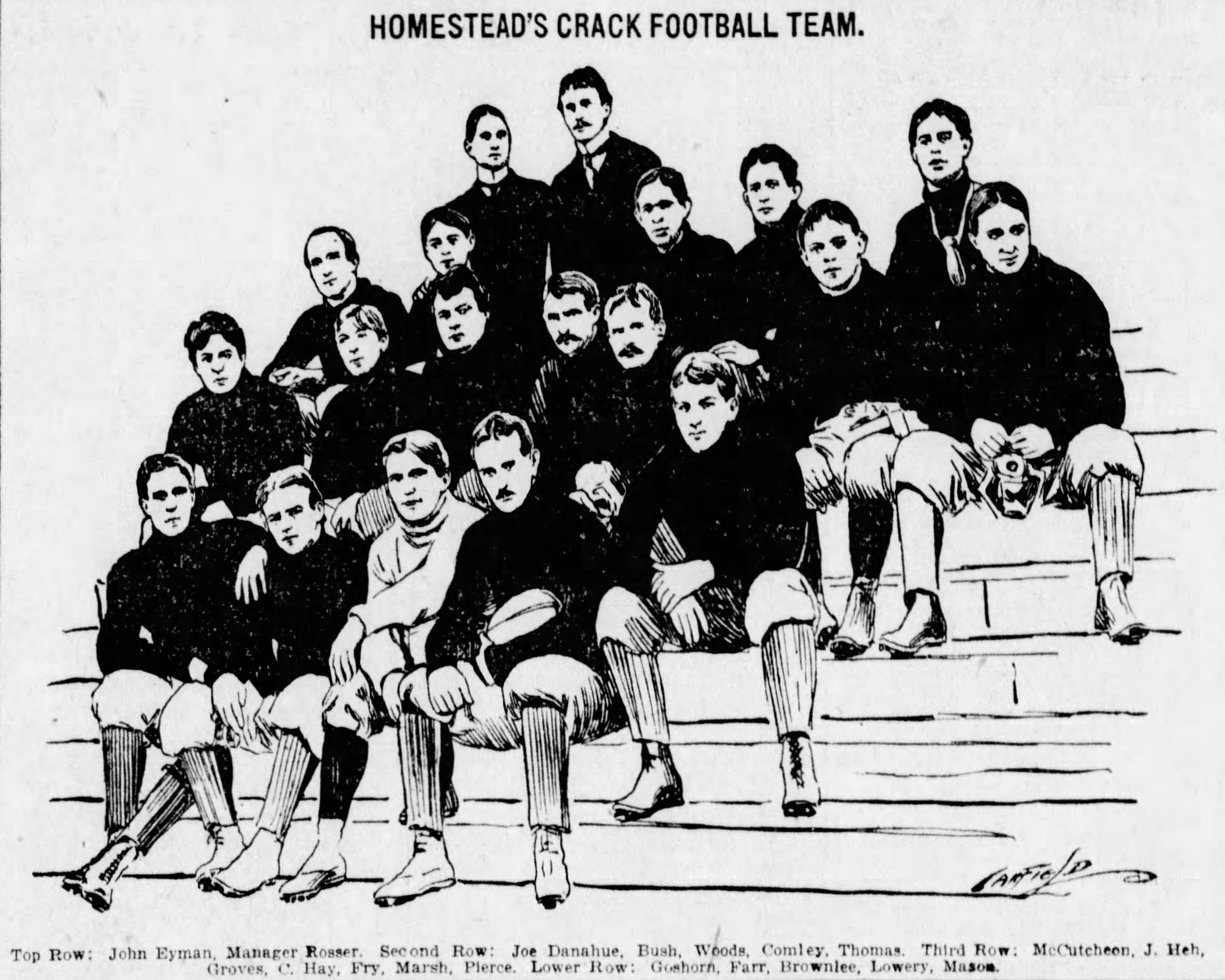
- Drawing from The Pittsburg[h] Press
- Record: 2–3
- Manager: Lewis Rosser
- Head coach: George Lowery
- Captain: George Lowery
- Home field: Steel Works Park

The 1899 Homestead Library & Athletic Club football team played professional football in 1899. The team was affiliated with the Homestead Library & Athletic Club in Homestead, Pennsylvania, near Pittsburgh.

== Organization ==
In 1898, William Chase Temple took over the Duquesne Country and Athletic Club, becoming the first individual team owner in professional football. In 1900, most of the Duquesne players were hired by the Homestead Library & Athletic Club, by offering them higher salaries.

Bemus Pierce was hired by Homestead in mid-October 1899. He played and got hurt in the November game versus Duquesne C. & A.C. He returned to Homestead L.A.C. in 1900 and 1901, helping lead the teams to an undefeated 21–0 record.

Homestead's coach and captain in 1899 was halfback George Lowery, who had played with Duquesne C. & A.C. in 1895–1897 and the Pittsburgh Athletic Club in 1898.

Prior to Homestead adopting blue and white colors for the 1900 season, The Pittsburg[h] Post stated that the club's colors were red and black. One game report mentioned the players' "red legs" and the "blood-red Homestead line".

== Season schedule ==
Date	Time	Opponent	Site	Result	Source
September 30		East Pittsburg A.A.	Steel Works Park; Homestead, PA	W 25–0	
October 7		Swissvale	Steel Works Park; Homestead, PA	W 12–0	
October 14	3:00 p.m.	Duquesne Country and Athletic Club	Steel Works Park; Homestead, PA	L 5–22	
October 28		Pittsburgh College	Steel Works Park; Homestead, PA	L 0–6 (forfeit)	
November 7		at Duquesne Country and Athletic Club	Exposition Park; Allegheny City, PA	L 0–53	

- A game with the 10th Regiment was not played on October 21 because they failed to show up. Homestead refunded money to the spectators.
- The Homestead team disbanded before Thanksgiving forcing the Latrobe A.A. (November 18), Crescent A.C. (November 22), Duquesne A.C. (November 25), Western University of Pennsylvania (November 30) to find new opponents.
