= Howard R. Reiter =

American football player, coach, and athletic director (1871–1957)

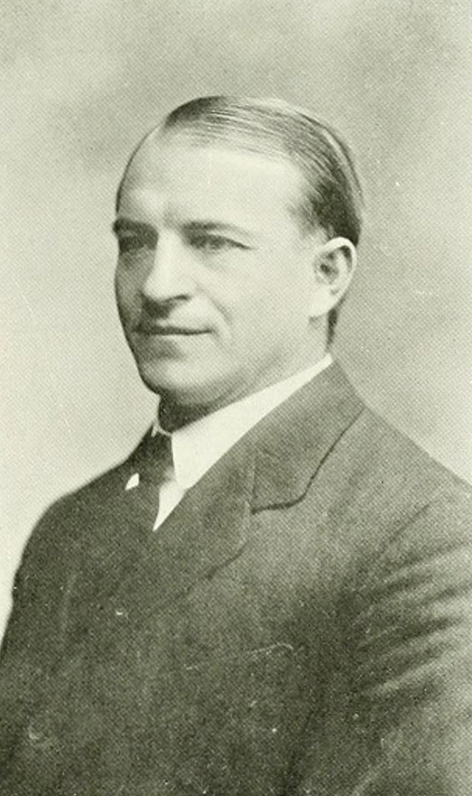
- Reiter pictured in The Epitome 1914, Lehigh yearbook

Biographical details
- Born: 1871
- Died: November 11, 1957 (aged 86); St. Petersburg, Florida, U.S.

Playing career

Football
- 1897–1899: Princeton
- 1902: Philadelphia Athletics (NFL)
- Position: Halfback

Coaching career (HC unless noted)

Football
- 1903–1909: Wesleyan
- 1910–1911: Lehigh

Baseball
- 1908–1909: Wesleyan

Administrative career (AD unless noted)
- 1910–1934: Lehigh

Head coaching record
- Overall: 29–47–8 (football); 14–20–2 (baseball)

Accomplishments and honors

Awards
- Consensus All-American (1899); Third-team All-American (1900)

Howard Roland "Bosey" Reiter (1871 – November 11, 1957) was an All-American football player, coach and athletic director. He was selected for the 1899 College Football All-America Team and played professional football as a player coach for the Philadelphia Athletics of the first National Football League in 1902. He was the head football coach at Wesleyan University from 1903 to 1909 and at Lehigh University from 1910 to 1911. Reiter has been credited by some with the development of the overhand spiral forward pass, which he claimed to have developed while playing for the Athletics in 1902.

== All-American at Princeton ==
Reiter was raised in Philadelphia, the son of Benjamin O. Reiter. Reiter enrolled at Princeton University, where he played football and baseball and was selected as a halfback on the 1899 College Football All-America Team. Upon completing his undergraduate coursework at Princeton, Reiter attended the Princeton Theological Seminary for three years. He tried out for the Princeton football team in 1900 while studying at the seminary, but was declared ineligible by Princeton's faculty committee on athletics, because he had already played four years of football while an undergraduate. Despite the ruling, rumors spread that Reiter continued to play for Princeton in 1900 under an assumed name.

== Professional football ==
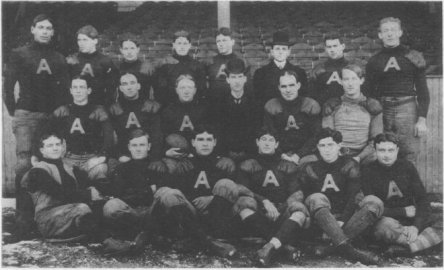
1902 Philadelphia Athletics football team

In September 1902, while still a seminary student, Reiter signed up to play professional football for Connie Mack's Philadelphia Athletics of the 1902 version of the National Football League. Reiter was hired not only as a player but also as coach of the Athletics. The Philadelphia Inquirer reported on Reiter's signing as follows:

"H.R. Reiter, one of Princeton's most noted graduate football players, who is now a senior in the Theological Seminary here, has been signed by the management of the Philadelphia American League football team to play halfback during the coming season. ... He will not let the engagement interfere with his course in the seminary, but will go to Philadelphia twice a week to practice and play the scheduled contests."

Reiter was the starting left halfback on the 1902 Athletics team until he broke his right leg near his hip while playing in a game against Watertown.

== Football coach at Wesleyan and Lehigh ==
In July 1903, after completing three years of seminary studies, The New York Times reported that he "passed a brilliant examination at the Presbytery meeting" and was granted a license as a minister. He moved to Ocean Park, New Jersey in the summer of 1903, working as a lifeguard during the week and preaching on Sundays. However, as football season approached, Reiter accepted a position as football coach at Wesleyan University. In 1905, Reiter added the title of physical director at Wesleyan. Reiter was a popular and energetic coach. After Wesleyan's 18–0 win over Williams in 1905, the fans at Wesleyan's field "went wild with excitement", and Reiter "was so tickled that he turned several handsprings and finally jumped on the back of 'Al' Inglis, Wesleyan's crack fullback a few years ago, and the two paraded in front of the stands." In 1906, The Washington Post published a feature article about Reiter's techniques for training Wesleyan athletes:

"Reiter is unusual. There are few directors of gymnasiums who can handle classes of men on the floor, teach them to fence, box and wrestle, coach them in football, baseball and track athletics, and lead them in exercises in the chapel. Reiter's chapel talks to the students are as much a feature of his work as the words of advice to the football men on the field. It is not hard to see why Wesleyan has moved up seven notches in physical well being since he took hold of things.

In August 1910, Reiter was hired away from Wesleyan by Lehigh University. Reiter coached the Lehigh football team from 1910 to 1911, with a record at Lehigh of 7–11–2. Reiter remained at Lehigh for many years as the head of the Department of Physical Education and a member of its Athletic Control Board.

Reiter also garnered publicity in 1902 when he saved a drowning man off the Ocean Park Pier in New Jersey. On seeing the drowning man go under the water, Reiter dove into the water to bring the man to the surface, finally succeeding on the third dive.

== Reiter's role in development of the overhead spiral forward pass ==
Reiter claimed to have invented the overhead spiral forward pass while playing professional football as a player-coach for Connie Mack's Philadelphia Athletics of the 1902 National Football League. While playing for the Athletics, Reiter was a teammate of Hawley Pierce, a former star for the Carlisle Indian School. Pierce, a Native American, taught Reiter to throw an underhand spiral pass, but Reiter had short arms and was unable to throw for distance from an underhand delivery. Accordingly, Reiter began working on an overhand spiral pass. Reiter recalled trying to imitate the motion of a baseball catcher throwing to second base. After practice and experimentation, Reiter "discovered he could get greater distance and accuracy throwing that way."

When Reiter took over as Wesleyan's football coach in 1903, the forward pass was not permitted under college football rules. However, when the rules changed for the 1906 season, Reiter was ready to introduce his overhand spiral forward pass technique. Reiter contended that the first modern forward pass in college football was thrown by Sammy Moore to Irwin van Tassel on October 3, 1906, in a game between Wesleyan and Yale in 1906. Van Tassel later described the historic play to the United Press:

"I was the right halfback, and on this formation played one yard back of our right tackle. The quarterback, Sam Moore, took the ball from center and faded eight or 10 yards back of our line. Our two ends angled down the field toward the sidelines as a decoy, and I slipped through the strong side of our line straight down the center and past the secondary defense. The pass worked perfectly. However, the quarterback coming up fast nailed me as I caught it. This brought the ball well into Yale territory, about the 20-yard line."

At the beginning of September 1907, Reiter announced his intention to build Wesleyan's entire offense around the spiral forward pass. A Massachusetts newspaper reported on Reiter's plans for the 1907 season: "Coach 'Bosey' Reiter of the Wesleyan football team announces that an endeavor will be made at Wesleyan this year to develop a fast eleven and one than can handle the spiral forward pass, as this will probably be the play most often used."

Upon taking over the Lehigh team in 1910, Reiter dedicated the summer training period to teach his players a new offensive scheme relying heavily on "new forward pass formations."

Reiter was regarded in his day as an innovator, and he was invited to teach a course in "The Theory and Practice of Football" at Harvard's summer school of physical education during the summers from 1907 to 1910. In 1910, Reiter's article, "Experiments in Football", was published in newspapers across the country. The article analyzed changes to the football rules, focusing especially on rule changes affecting the use of the forward pass.

In 1955, Reiter and van Tassel were honored in a ceremony in Middletown, Connecticut for their role in developing the forward pass.

In 2007, Sports Illustrated published an account of the invention of the forward pass. In that article, writer Sally Jenkins credited coach Eddie Cochems of the Saint Louis Billikens with calling the first forward pass in college football. Jenkins then wrote as follows with respect to the respective roles of Cochems and Reiter:

"The first downfield overhand spiral was completed on September 5, 1906, when Saint Louis quarterback Bradbury Robinson threw to teammate Jack Schneider in a little-noticed game against Carroll College. A more notable pass was completed against Yale, by Wesleyan on Oct. 3, but Carlisle may deserve partial credit for that throw: Wesleyan's coach, Howard R. Reiter, claimed he learned how to throw a spiral from a Carlisle Indian in 1903 when Reiter coached the semipro Philadelphia Football Athletics and the Indian was on the team."

== Family and legacy ==
In January 1905, Reiter married Miss Bailey J. Edgren at the bride's home in Plainfield, New Jersey. Reiter moved to St. Petersburg, Florida in 1956. He died there in November 1957, aged 86.

Each year, a faculty committee at Lehigh University awards the Bosey Reiter Leadership Cup to a student who is the outstanding leader in the university's senior class.

== Head coaching record ==
Year	Team	Overall	Conference	Standing	Bowl/playoffs
Wesleyan Methodists (Independent) (1903–1909)
1903	Wesleyan	3–6–1			
1904	Wesleyan	3–7			
1905	Wesleyan	7–2–1			
1906	Wesleyan	2–4–1			
1907	Wesleyan	1–7–1			
1908	Wesleyan	3–5–2			
1909	Wesleyan	3–5–1			
Wesleyan:		22–36–7			
Lehigh Brown and White (Independent) (1910–1911)
1910	Lehigh	2–6–1			
1911	Lehigh	5–5–1			
Lehigh:		7–11–2			
Total:		29–47–8			
