= Dave Fultz =

American athlete and coach (1875–1959)

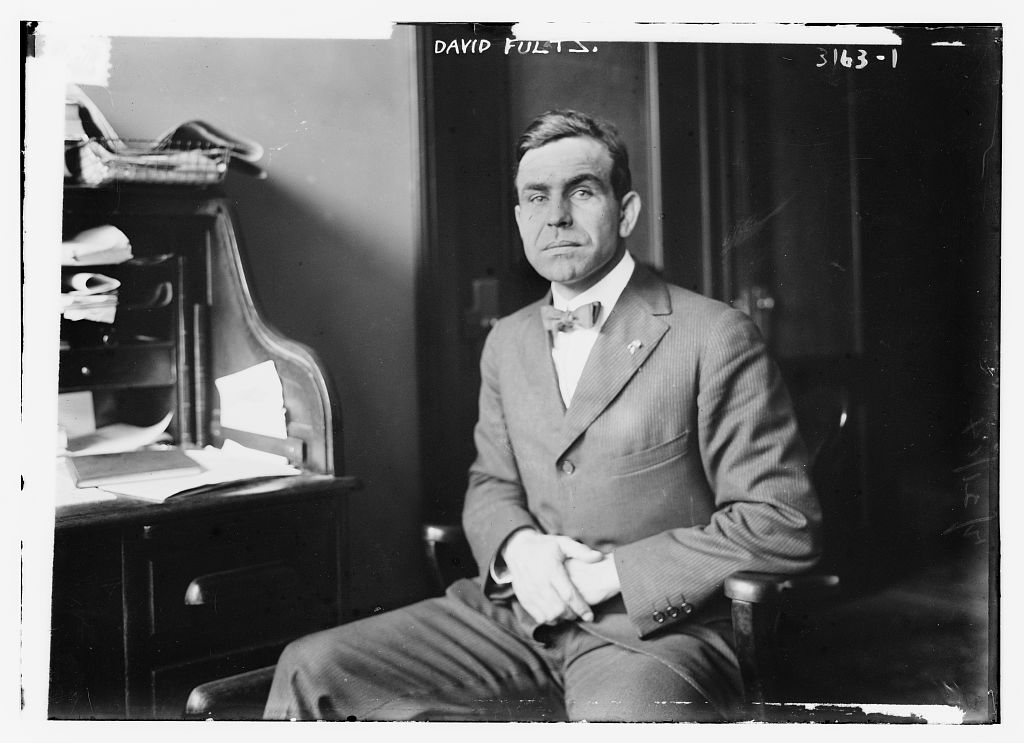
- Outfielder
- Born: May 29, 1875; Staunton, Virginia, U.S.
- Died: October 29, 1959 (aged 84); DeLand, Florida, U.S.
- Batted: Right Threw: Right

MLB debut
- July 1, 1898, for the Philadelphia Phillies

Last MLB appearance
- September 30, 1905, for the New York Highlanders

MLB statistics
- Batting average: .271
- Home runs: 3
- Runs batted in: 223
- Stats at Baseball Reference

Teams
- Philadelphia Phillies (1898–1899); Baltimore Orioles (1899); Philadelphia Athletics (1901–1902); New York Highlanders (1903–1905)
Football career
Profile
Position	Fullback
Career information
College	Brown
Career history
Playing
Duquesne Country & A. C. (1899); Homestead Library & A. C. (1900–1901)
Coaching
Missouri (1898–1899); Lafayette (1902); Brown (1903); NYU (1904); Columbia (1910–1911)
Awards and highlights
3× W. Pennsylvania champ (1899–1901); Second-team All-American (1897)

David Lewis Fultz (May 29, 1875 – October 29, 1959) was an American football and baseball player and coach. He played Major League Baseball as a center fielder in the National League with the Philadelphia Phillies (1898–1899) and Baltimore Orioles (1899), and for the Philadelphia Athletics (1901–1902) and New York Highlanders (1903–1905) of the American League. He batted and threw right-handed. In a seven-season career, Fultz posted a .271 batting average with 223 RBI and three home runs in 644 games played. Fultz played college football and college baseball at Brown University, from which he graduated in 1898. He served as the head football coach at the University of Missouri (1898–1899), Lafayette College (1902), Brown (1903), and New York University (1904), compiling a career college football coaching record of 26–19–2. Fultz was also the head baseball coach at the United States Naval Academy in 1907 and at Columbia University from 1910 to 1911.

== Early life and career ==
A native of Staunton, Virginia, Fultz graduated in 1898 with a law degree from Brown University, where he excelled in football and baseball and was named captain of both teams. Signed by the Phillies the same year, he played for them in part of two seasons and went to Baltimore in the 1899 midseason and played under John McGraw. With McGraw, Fultz developed as a solid base stealer, and in hit and run and bunting situations.

== Later career in baseball ==
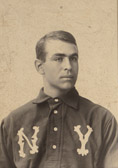
Fultz in 1903

When the American League was created, Fultz joined the Philadelphia Athletics of Connie Mack in 1901, appearing at shortstop and second base, and later moved to center field. Fultz led his team with 36 stolen bases and hit .292 with 95 runs scored. His most productive season came in 1902, when he stole 44 bases, hit a career-high .302, and led the American League with 109 runs. On September 4, he stole second base, third and home, in the second inning of a game against the Detroit Tigers.

From 1903 to 1905, Fultz played for the New York Highlanders when Clark Griffith managed the team. During the offseason and in his spare time he attended New York Law School, passing the New York bar exam. Fultz averaged 30 stolen bases per season with a high 42 in 1905. That season, he suffered a late September collision with teammate Kid Elberfeld, breaking his nose and jaw, and retired at 31 age.

== Football playing career ==
Fultz also played professional football in 1900 and 1901 with the Homestead Library & Athletic Club, as a fullback. In 1901 he was named the team's captain. Prior to playing for Homestead, Fultz played football for the Duquesne Country and Athletic Club in 1899.

== Coaching career ==
Fultz served as the head football coach at the University of Missouri (1898–1899), Lafayette College (1902), Brown University (1903), and New York University (1904), compiling a career college football record of 26–19–2. He also coached baseball at the United States Naval Academy, Columbia University and NYU.

Fultz got his first coaching job in 1898 as the eighth head football coach at the University of Missouri. Missouri finished with a 1–4–1 record under Fultz. He returned to coach the Tigers for one game in 1900, a victory, before handing over the reins to his former Brown teammate, Fred W. Murphy. Ernest Cleveland "E.C." White coached Missouri to a 9–2 record in 1899.

In 1902, Fultz returned to coaching at Lafayette College and posted a record of 8–3. In six of the victories, the opponents were held scoreless. In 1904 Fultz became the seventh head football coach at the New York University (NYU). His coaching record at NYU was 3–6.

== Later life ==
In 1906, Fultz became a practicing attorney. In 1912, he attempted to unionize major league players in an organization called the Players Fraternity. He became president, with Ty Cobb, Christy Mathewson, Ed Sweeney, and Red Dooin serving as vice presidents. The group threatened to strike in 1917, but the walkout was averted after Fultz obtained some concessions for the players. The union was disintegrated during World War I.

After service as a World War I lieutenant aviator, Fultz became president of the International League. He retired in 1947 as a lawyer with offices at Broadway in New York City, and came to Lake Helen, Florida, where he bought the estate of Henry A. DeLand. Fultz died on October 29, 1959, in DeLand, Florida, at the age of 84.

== Head coaching record ==
=== College football ===
Year	Team	Overall	Conference	Standing	Bowl/playoffs
Missouri Tigers (Independent) (1898)
1898	Missouri	1–4–1			
1899	Missouri	9–2			
Missouri:		10–6–1			
Lafayette (Independent) (1902)
1902	Lafayette	8–3			
Lafayette:		8–3			
Brown Bears (Independent) (1903)
1903	Brown	5–4–1			
Brown:		5–4–1			
NYU Violets (Independent) (1904)
1904	NYU	3–6			
NYU:		3–6			
Total:		26–19–2			

== See also ==
- List of Major League Baseball annual runs scored leaders
