= 1900 Homestead Library & Athletic Club season =

Football team in Pennsylvania

1900 Homestead Library & Athletic Club football
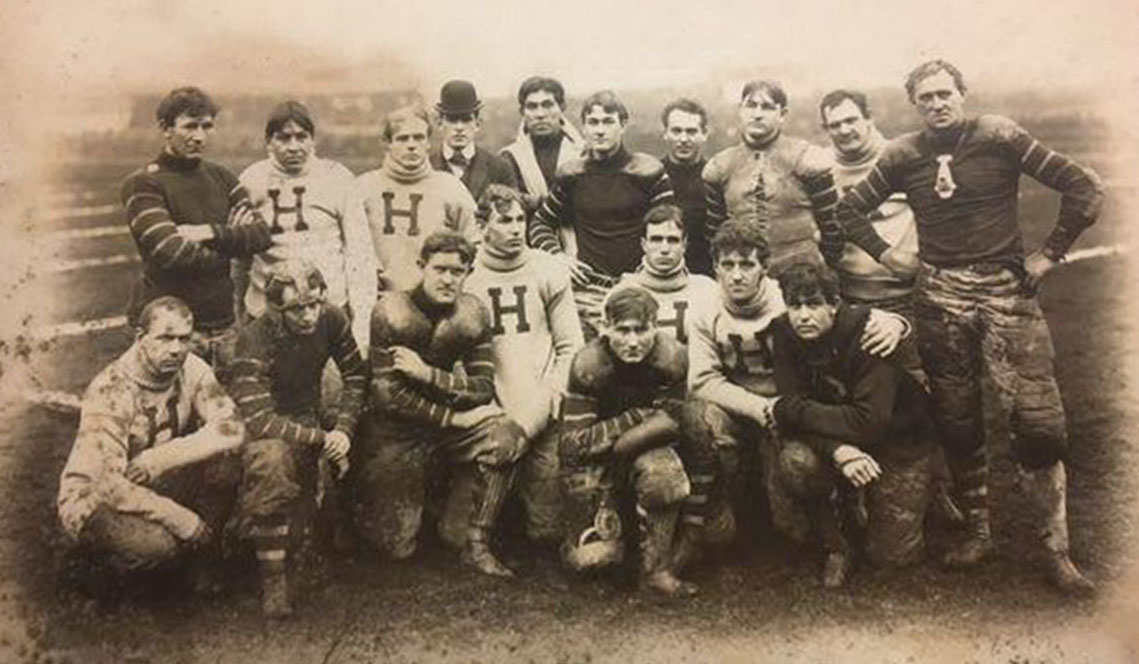

Professional football champion
- Record: 10–0
- Manager: Bill Church
- Head coach: Bill Church
- Captain: Bill Church (1st half); Dave Fultz (2nd half)
- Home field: Steel Works Park

The 1900 Homestead Library & Athletic Club football team won the professional football championship of 1900. The team was affiliated with the Homestead Library & Athletic Club in Homestead, Pennsylvania, near Pittsburgh. The team featured a lineup of former college All-Americans paid by Pittsburgh Pirates' minority-owner William Chase Temple.

== Organization ==
In 1898, William Chase Temple took over the Duquesne Country and Athletic Club, becoming the first individual team owner in professional football. In 1900, most of the Duquesne players were hired by the Homestead Library & Athletic Club, by offering them higher salaries.

Over the next two seasons (1900 and 1901), Homestead fielded the best professional football team in the country and did not lose a game. The 1900 team reportedly paid its player "from $50 to $100 a game plus 'expenses.'"

After a season as coach of Georgetown, former Princeton tackle Bill Church was hired by Homestead as the team's captain and manager. Other players for the 1900 Homestead team included Dave Fultz and J. A. Gammons (halfbacks from Brown University), Pete Overfield (center from Penn), Bemus Pierce (guard from the Carlisle Indian School), Art Poe (end from Princeton), Otto Wagonhurst (from Penn), John Hall (end from Yale), George Young (quarterback from Cornell), Willis Richardson (from Brown), Artie Miller (from Carlisle), Grenville Lewis (fullback from Maryland and Columbian), John Winstein (tackle, various local teams), and guards M. P. McNulty (from Notre Dame) and P. J. Lawler. George H. Brooke (fullback from Penn) was signed to appear only in "important" games, as he was coaching Swarthmore during the same season.

== Season summary ==
Before the season, the schedule was announced as: October 6 vs. Pittsburgh College, October 13 vs. Altoona, October 20 @ Greensburg, October 27 vs. Detroit A.C., November 3 @ Latrobe, November 6 @ Duquesne C. & A.C., November 10 vs. Greensburg, November 17 vs Lehigh, November 24 vs. Latrobe, November 29 vs. Bucknell.

== Season schedule ==
Date	Opponent	Site	Result	Source
October 6	Pittsburgh College	Steel Works Park; Homestead, PA	W 37–0	
October 13	Altoona Athletic Club	Steel Works Park; Homestead, PA	W 58–0	
October 20	at Greensburg Athletic Association	Athletic Park; Greensburg, PA	W 6–5	
October 27	Detroit Athletic Club	Steel Works Park; Homestead, PA	W 54–0	
November 3	at Latrobe Athletic Association	Athletic Park; Latrobe, PA	W 11–0	
November 6	at Duquesne Country and Athletic Club	Exposition Park; Allegheny City, PA	W 10–0	
November 10	Greensburg Athletic Association	Steel Works Park; Homestead, PA	W 12–0	
November 17	Lehigh	Steel Works Park; Homestead, PA	W 50–0	
November 24	East End Athletic Association	Steel Works Park; Homestead, PA	W 30–0	
November 29	Latrobe Athletic Association	Steel Works Park; Homestead, PA	W 12–0	
