= Christy Mathewson =

American baseball player (1880–1925)

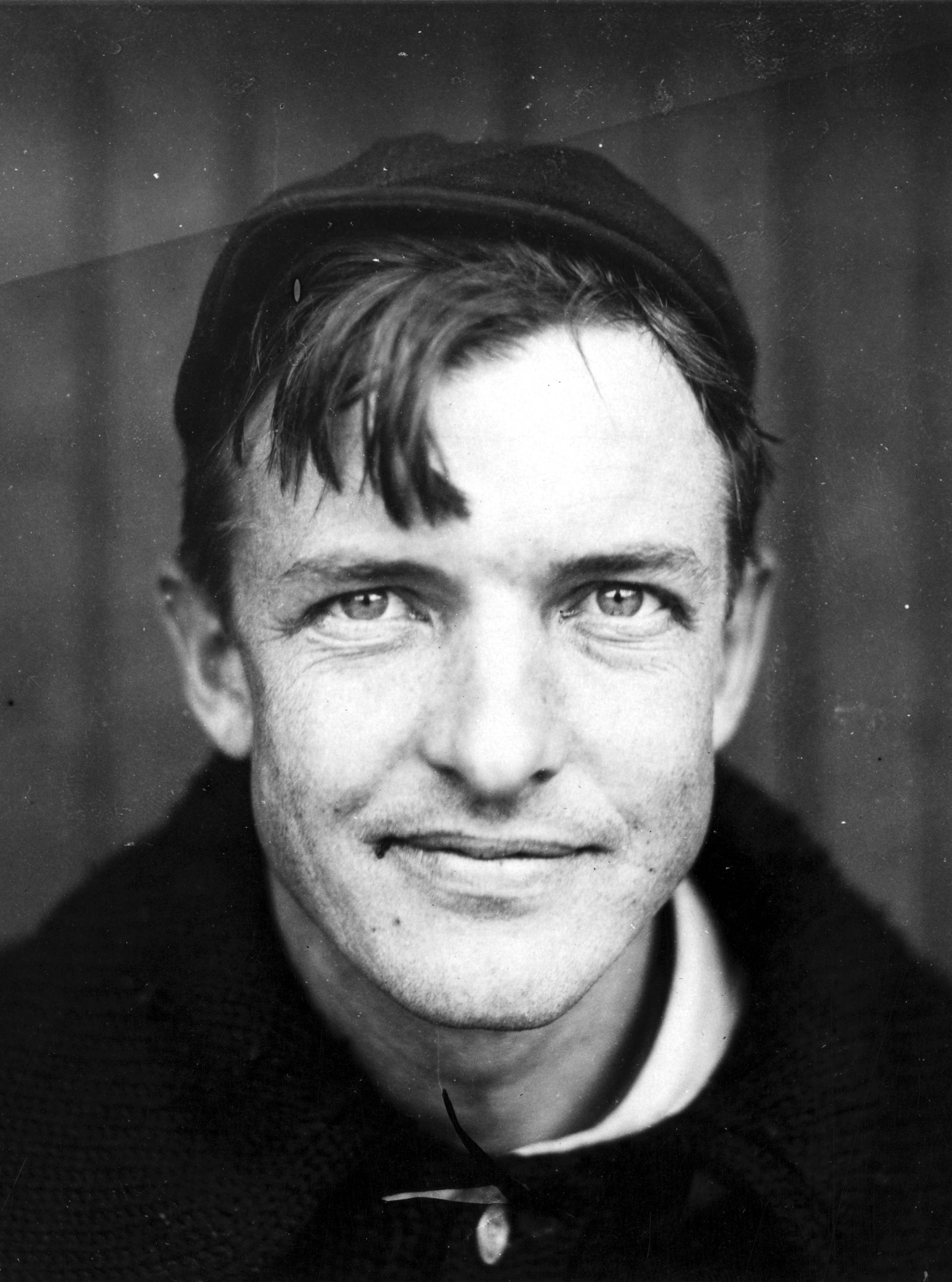
- Mathewson in 1910
- Pitcher
- Born: August 12, 1880; Factoryville, Pennsylvania, U.S.
- Died: October 7, 1925 (aged 45); Saranac Lake, New York, U.S.
- Batted: Right Threw: Right

MLB debut
- July 17, 1900, for the New York Giants

Last MLB appearance
- September 4, 1916, for the Cincinnati Reds

MLB statistics
- Win–loss record: 373–188
- Earned run average: 2.13
- Strikeouts: 2,502
- Managerial record: 164–176
- Winning %: .482
- Stats at Baseball Reference
- Managerial record at Baseball Reference

Teams
- As player: New York Giants (1900–1916); Cincinnati Reds (1916); As manager: Cincinnati Reds (1916–1918); As coach: New York Giants (1919–1921)

Career highlights and awards
- 2× World Series champion (1905, 1921); 2× Triple Crown (1905, 1908); 4× NL wins leader (1905, 1907, 1908, 1910); 5× NL ERA leader (1905, 1908, 1909, 1911, 1913); 5× NL strikeout leader (1903–1905, 1907, 1908); Pitched two no-hitters; Name honored by the Giants; Major League Baseball All-Century Team

Member of the National

Baseball Hall of Fame
- Induction: 1936
- Vote: 90.7% (first ballot)
Football career
Profile
Position	Fullback
Career information
High school	Keystone Academy
College	Bucknell
Career history
1898	Greensburg A. A.
1902	Pittsburgh Stars
Awards and highlights
Pittsburgh Stars 1902 Championship team
Other information
Military career
Allegiance	United States
Branch	U.S. Army
Service years	1918–1919
Rank	Captain
Units	Chemical Warfare Service; 1st Gas Regiment
Conflicts	World War I: Western Front (DOW)
Signature

Christopher Mathewson (August 12, 1880 – October 7, 1925), nicknamed "Big Six," "the Christian Gentleman," "Matty," and "the Gentleman's Hurler," was an American professional baseball pitcher who played 17 seasons in Major League Baseball (MLB) for the New York Giants. He stood 6 ft 1 in (1.85 m) tall and weighed 195 pounds (88 kg). He was among the most dominant pitchers in baseball history, and ranks in the all-time top 10 in several key pitching categories, including wins, shutouts, and earned run average. In 1936, Mathewson was elected into the Baseball Hall of Fame as one of its first five members.

Mathewson grew up in Factoryville, Pennsylvania, and began playing semiprofessional baseball when he was 14 years old. He played in the minor leagues in 1899, recording a record of 21 wins and two losses. He pitched for the Giants the next season, but was sent back to the minors. He eventually returned to the Giants and went on to win a National League record 373 career games, tying Grover Cleveland Alexander for the third-most career wins of all time. He led the Giants to the franchise's first World Series championship in 1905 by pitching a single World Series record three shutouts. He also holds the record for career shutouts in the World Series, with four. Mathewson never pitched on Sundays, owing to his devout Christian beliefs. Mathewson served in the United States Army's Chemical Warfare Service in World War I, and was accidentally exposed to chemical weapons during training. His respiratory system was weakened from the exposure, causing him to contract tuberculosis, from which he died in Saranac Lake, New York in 1925.

== Early life ==
Christopher Mathewson was born on August 12, 1880, in Factoryville, Pennsylvania, and he attended high school at Keystone Academy.

== College career ==
He attended college at Bucknell University, where he served as class president and played on the school's football, basketball, and baseball teams. Mathewson was also a member of the fraternity of Phi Gamma Delta. His first experience of semi-professional baseball came in 1895, when he was 14 years old. The manager of the Factoryville ball club asked Mathewson to pitch in a game with a rival team in Mill City, Pennsylvania. Mathewson helped his hometown team to a 19–17 victory, but with his batting rather than his pitching. He continued to play baseball during his years at Bucknell, pitching for minor league teams in Honesdale and Meridian, Pennsylvania. Mathewson was selected to the Walter Camp All-American football team in 1900. He was a drop-kicker.

== Professional football career ==
Mathewson played football at Keystone Academy from 1895 to 1897. He turned pro in 1898, appearing as a fullback with the Greensburg Athletic Association. While a member of the New York Giants, Mathewson played fullback for the Pittsburgh Stars of the first National Football League. However, Mathewson disappeared from the team in the middle of the team's 1902 season. Some historians speculate that the Giants got word that their star pitcher was risking his baseball career for the Stars and ordered him to stop, while others feel that the Stars' coach, Willis Richardson, got rid of Mathewson because he felt that, since the fullback's punting skills were hardly used, he could replace him with a local player, Shirley Ellis.

== Professional baseball career ==
=== Minor leagues ===
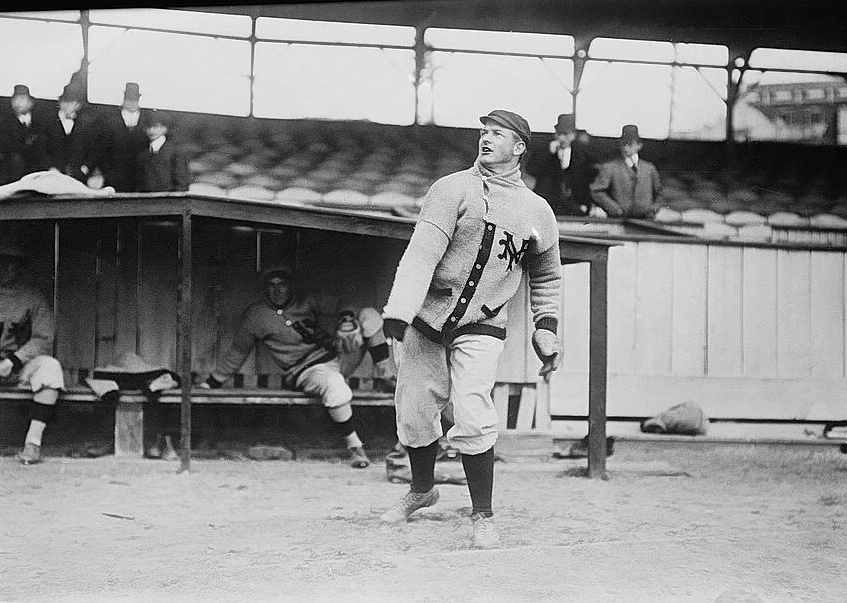
Mathewson warming up as a New York Giant in 1910

In 1899, Mathewson signed to play professional baseball with Taunton Herrings of the New England League, where he finished with a record of 2–13. The next season, he moved on to play on the Norfolk Phenoms of the Virginia League. He finished that season with a 20–2 record. He continued to attend Bucknell during that time.

=== New York Giants (1900–1916) ===
In July 1900, the New York Giants purchased his contract from Norfolk for $1,500 (equivalent to $58,000 in 2025). Between July and September 1900, Mathewson appeared in six games for the Giants. He started one of those games and compiled a 0–3 record. Displeased with his performance, the Giants returned him to Norfolk and demanded their money back. Later that month, the Cincinnati Reds picked up Mathewson off the Norfolk roster. On December 15, 1900, the Reds quickly traded Mathewson back to the Giants for Amos Rusie.

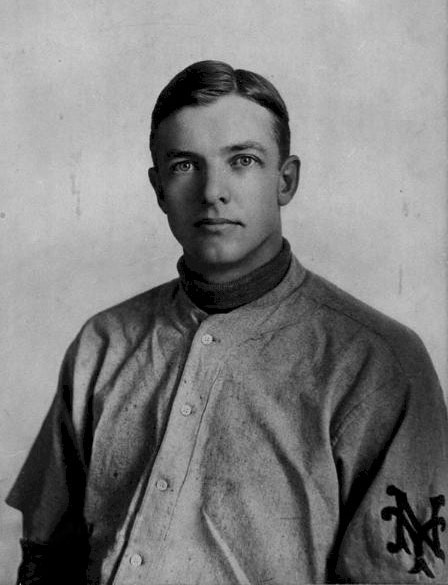
Mathewson in his New York Giants uniform

During his 17-year career, Mathewson won 373 games and lost 188 for a .665 winning percentage. His career earned run average of 2.13 and 79 career shutouts are among the best all time for pitchers, and his 373 wins are still number one in the National League, tied with Grover Cleveland Alexander. He employed a good fastball, outstanding control, and, especially a new pitch he termed the "fadeaway" (later known in baseball as the "screwball"), which he learned from teammate Dave Williams in 1898.

This reference is challenged by Ken Burns documentary Baseball in which it is stated that Mathewson learned his "fadeaway" from Rube Foster when New York Giants manager John McGraw quietly hired Rube to show the Giants bullpen what he knew. Many baseball historians consider this story apocryphal.

Mathewson recorded 2,507 career strikeouts against only 848 walks. He is famous for his 25 pitching duels with Mordecai "Three Finger" Brown, who won 13 of the duels against Mathewson's 11, with one no-decision.

Mathewson was a very good-hitting pitcher in his major league career, posting a .215 batting average with 151 runs, seven home runs, and 167 runs batted in. In 10 of his 17 years in the majors, he had at least 10 runs batted in, with a season-high of 20 in 1903. He batted .281 (9-for-32) in 11 World Series games.

By 1903, Mathewson's stature was such that when he briefly signed a contract with the St. Louis Browns of the American League, he was thought to be the spark the Browns needed to win the pennant. The Browns had finished a strong second in 1902, five games behind the Philadelphia Athletics. They offered him four times what he was making with the Giants. However, as part of the settlement that ended the two-year war between the American and National Leagues, Mathewson and Browns owner Robert Lee Hedges tore up the contract. Hedges later said that ensuring the return of peace to the game was more important, even if it meant effectively giving up a pennant.

From 1903 to 1905, Mathewson established himself as a premier pitcher. Posting low earned run averages and winning nearly 100 games, Mathewson helped lead the Giants to their first National League title in 1904. Though no World Series was held that year, McGraw proclaimed the Giants as the best team in the world.

Mathewson strove even harder in 1905. After switching to catcher, Roger Bresnahan had begun collaborating with Mathewson, whose advanced memory of hitter weaknesses paved the way for a historic season. Pinpoint control guided Mathewson's pitches to Bresnahan's glove. In 338 innings, Mathewson walked only 64 batters. He shut out opposing teams eight times, pitching entire games in brief 90-minute sessions. Besides winning 31 games, Mathewson recorded an earned run average of 1.28 and 206 strikeouts. He led the National League in all three categories, earning him the Triple Crown.

Mathewson's Giants won the 1905 World Series over the Philadelphia Athletics. Mathewson was the starting pitcher in game one, and pitched a four-hit shutout for the victory. Three days later, with the series tied 1–1, he pitched another four-hit shutout. Then, two days later in game five, he threw a six-hit shutout to clinch the series for the Giants. In a span of only six days, Mathewson had pitched three complete games without allowing a run, while giving up only 14 hits.

The next year, Mathewson lost much of his edge, owing to an early-season diagnosis of diphtheria. McGraw pulled over 260 innings from him, but these were plagued with struggle. Though he maintained a 22–12 record, his 2.97 earned run average was well above the league average of 2.62. His 1.271 walks plus hits per innings pitched, quite uncharacteristic of him, was due to an increased number of hits and walks.

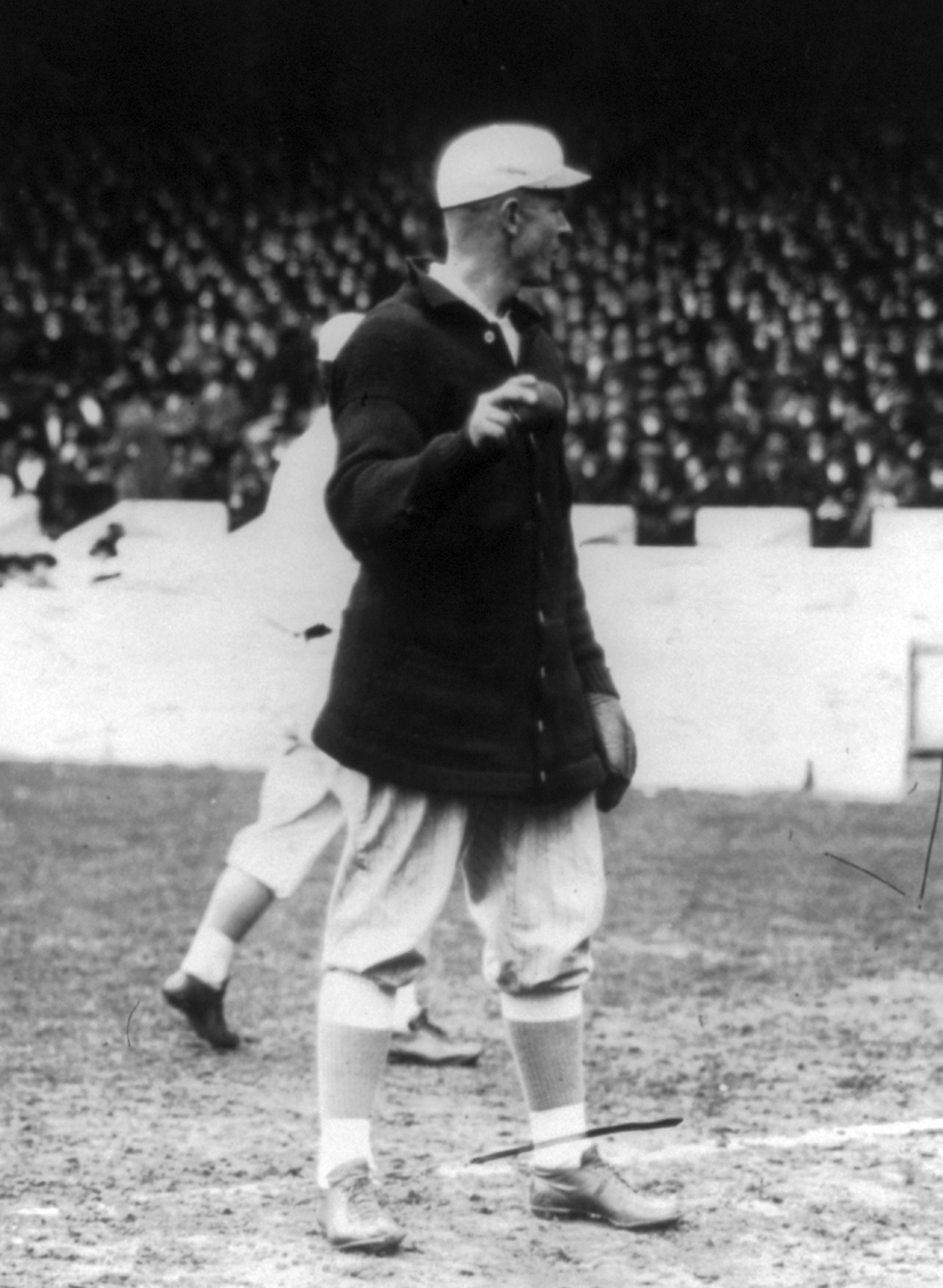
Mathewson with the Giants, c. 1913

By 1908, Mathewson was back on top as the league's elite pitcher. Winning the most games of his career, 37, coupled with a 1.43 earned run average and 259 strikeouts, he claimed a second triple crown. He also led the league in starts, innings pitched, complete games, and shutouts, and held hitters to an exceptionally low 0.827 walks plus hits per innings pitched. He even led the league in saves, racking up 5 of them in 12 relief appearances. Unfortunately, the Giants were unable to take home the pennant due to what was ultimately known as Merkle's Boner, an incident that cost the Giants a crucial game against the Chicago Cubs, who eventually defeated the Giants in the standings by one game.

Mathewson returned for an outstanding 1909 season; though not as dominant as the previous year, he posted a better earned run average (1.14), and a record of 25–6. He repeated a strong performance in 1910 and then again in 1911, when the Giants captured their first pennant since 1905. The Giants ultimately lost the 1911 World Series to the Philadelphia Athletics, the same team they had defeated for the 1905 championship. Mathewson and Rube Marquard allowed two game-winning home runs to Hall of Famer Frank Baker, earning him the nickname, "Home Run". Mathewson, the team's "star pitcher", signed a three-year contract with the Giants in late 1910, for the upcoming 1911, 1912 and 1913 seasons, the first time he had signed a contract over a year in length.

In 1912, Mathewson gave another stellar performance. Capturing the pennant, the Giants were fueled by the stolen-base game and a superior pitching staff capped by Rube Marquard, the "11,000-dollar lemon" who turned around to win 26 games, 19 of them consecutively. In the 1912 World Series, the Giants faced the Boston Red Sox, the 1904 American League pennant winners who would have faced the Giants in the World Series that year had one been played. Though Mathewson threw three complete games and maintained an earned run average below 1.00, numerous errors by the Giants, including a lazy popup dropped by Fred Snodgrass in the eighth game (Game 2 was a tie), cost them the championship. The Giants also lost the 1913 World Series, a 101-win season cemented by Mathewson's final brilliant season on the mound: a league-leading 2.06 earned run average in over 300 innings pitched complemented by 0.6 bases on balls per nine innings pitched.

For the remainder of his career with the Giants, Mathewson began to struggle. In 1914, he finished 24-13 after a 19-5 start, as Boston's "Miracle" Braves overtook the Giants for the pennant in the second half of the season. Soon, the former champions fell into decline. In 1915, Mathewson's penultimate season in New York, the Giants were the worst team in the National League standings. After a slow start the following year as an infrequent starter and occasional reliever, Mathewson, who had expressed interest in serving as a manager, wound up with a three-year deal to manage the Cincinnati Reds effective July 21, 1916.

== Managerial career ==
=== Cincinnati Reds (1916–1918) ===
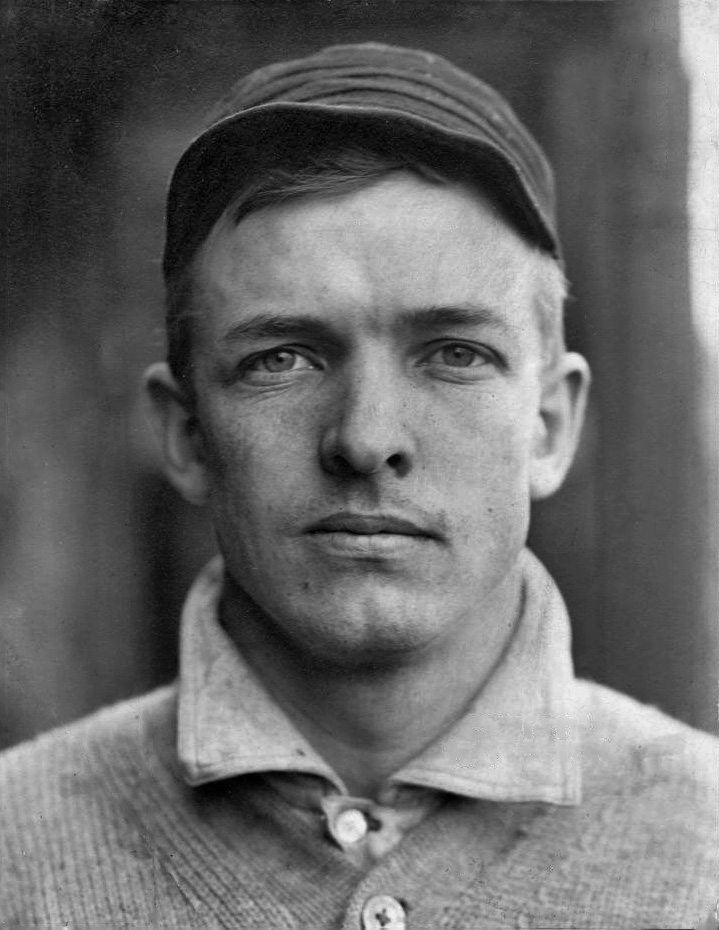
Mathewson in 1904

On July 20, 1916, Mathewson's career came full circle when he was traded to the Cincinnati Reds along with Edd Roush. He was immediately named as the Reds' player-manager. However, for all intents and purposes, his playing career was over. He appeared in only one game as a pitcher for the Reds, on September 4, 1916. He faced Brown in the second half of a doubleheader, which was billed as the final meeting between the two old baseball warriors. The high-scoring game was a win for Mathewson's Reds over Brown's Cubs, 10–8.

Mathewson retired as a player after the season and managed the Reds for the entire 1917 season and the first 118 games of 1918, compiling a total record of 164–176 as a manager.

== Personal life and literary career ==
Mathewson married Jane Stoughton (1880–1967) in 1903. Their only child, Christopher Jr., was born shortly after. Christy Mathewson Jr. served in World War II, and died in an explosion at his home in Texas on August 16, 1950. During Mathewson's playing years, the family lived in a duplex on the Upper West Side, at Columbus and 85th, alongside Mathewson's manager John McGraw and his wife Blanche. Mathewson and McGraw remained friends for the rest of their lives. In the 1909 offseason, Christy Mathewson's younger brother Nicholas Mathewson died by suicide in a neighbor's barn. Another brother, Henry Mathewson, pitched briefly for the Giants before dying of tuberculosis in 1917.

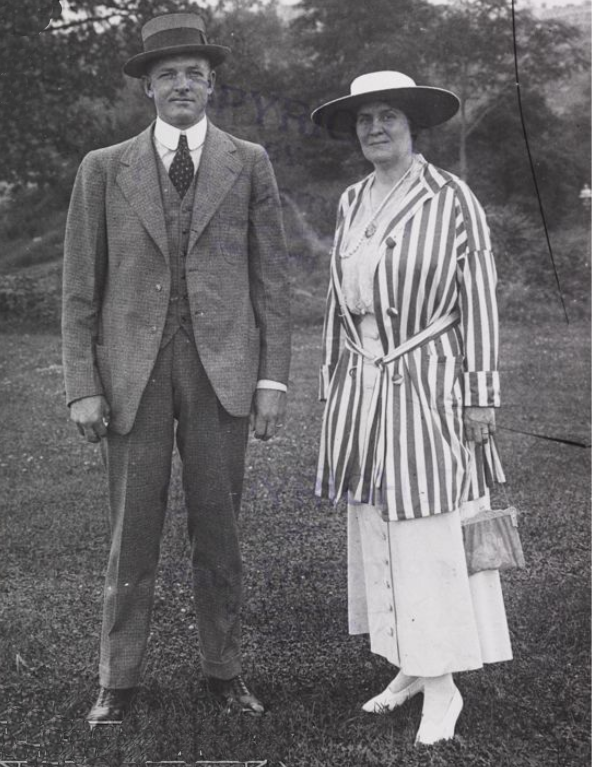
Mathewson and his wife Jane, c. 1916

Mathewson was highly regarded in the baseball world during his lifetime. As he was a clean-cut, intellectual collegiate, his rise to fame brought a better name to the typical ballplayer, who usually spent his time gambling, boozing, or womanizing. As noted in The National League Story (1961) by Lee Allen, Mathewson was a devout Christian and never pitched on Sunday, a promise he made to his mother that brought him popularity among the more religious New York fans and earned him the nickname "The Christian Gentleman". However, the impact of this practice on the Giants was minimized, since, in the eight-team National League, only the Chicago Cubs (Illinois), Cincinnati Reds (Ohio), and St. Louis Cardinals (Missouri) played home games in states that allowed professional sports on Sunday.

In his free time, Mathewson enjoyed nature walks, reading, golf, and checkers, of which he was a renowned champion player. The combination of athletic skill and intellectual hobbies made him a favorite for many fans, even those opposed to the Giants. Sportswriters praised him, and in his prime every game he started began with deafening cheers. Sometimes, the distraction prompted him to walk out 10 minutes after his fielders took the field. Mathewson soon became the unspoken captain of the Giants.

He was the only player to whom John McGraw ever gave full discretion. McGraw told many younger players to watch and listen to his wisdom.

Mathewson garnered respect throughout the baseball world as a pitcher of great sportsmanship. He was often asked to write columns concerning upcoming games. In 1912, with the editing and ghostwriting aid of sportswriter John Wheeler, Mathewson published his classic memoir Pitching in a Pinch, or Pitching from the Inside, which was admired by poet Marianne Moore and is still in print. In 1913, Mathewson and playwright Rida Johnson Young co-wrote a mildly successful play called The Girl and The Pennant, which was inspired by Helene Hathaway Britton's ownership of the St. Louis Cardinals. The play ran for 20 performances at Broadway's Lyric Theatre during October–November 1913. Mathewson also co-wrote (again, with the assistance of ghostwriter Wheeler) a series of children's baseball novels (the "Matty Books"): Won in the Ninth (1910), Pitcher Pollock (1914), Catcher Craig (1915), First Base Faulkner (1916), and Second Base Sloan (1917).

One of the journalists to unmask the 1919 Black Sox, Hugh Fullerton, consulted Mathewson for information about baseball gambling. Fullerton trusted Mathewson for his writing intellect, as well as his unbiased standpoint. As a player and manager, Mathewson also had several seasons of experience playing alongside Hal Chase, a veteran major league player widely rumored to have been involved in several gambling incidents and attempts to fix games.

Representing the only former ballplayer among the group of investigating journalists, Mathewson played a small role in Fullerton's exposure of the 1919 World Series scandal.

== World War I and afterward ==
Late in the 1918 season, Mathewson enlisted in the United States Army during World War I. His wife Jane was very much opposed to the decision, but Mathewson insisted on going. He served overseas as a captain in the newly formed Chemical Warfare Service (CWS) along with Ty Cobb. Mathewson served with the American Expeditionary Forces until February 1919 and was discharged later that month.

Mathewson developed tuberculosis shortly after his military service. It was widely assumed his disease was caused by his work with chemical weapons, largely due to the conventional wisdom that tuberculosis more easily infects lungs that have been damaged by these gases. This narrative was given further credence from a passage in Al Stump's 1961 biography of Ty Cobb, which says that Cobb and Mathewson were both accidentally gassed during a chemical training exercise in Choignes, France where eight men died; Mathewson purportedly told Cobb afterwards that he had 'got a good dose of that stuff. I feel terrible.' This account has widely been accepted as true, although it is not without its detractors: Branch Rickey, who also served in the CWS alongside Mathewson, flatly denied the incident; other historians have noted that Stump's book, published after Cobb's death, is sensationalized and generally unreliable. Further, some historians question whether the incident ever occurred. Mathewson himself never mentioned a training accident during his lifetime, but acknowledged that he had been exposed to potentially lethal gases on various occasions while demonstrating gas shells to students: "We were careful, but there is no doubt the accumulated gases affected my lungs," he later said.

Although he returned to serve as a coach for the Giants from 1919 to 1921, he spent a good portion of that time in Saranac Lake fighting the tuberculosis, initially at the Trudeau Sanitorium, and later in a house that he had built. In 1923, Mathewson returned to professional baseball when Giants attorney Emil Fuchs and he put together a syndicate that bought the Boston Braves. Although initial plans called for Mathewson to be principal owner and team president, his health had deteriorated so much that he could perform only nominal duties. He turned over the presidency to Fuchs after the season.

== Death and legacy ==
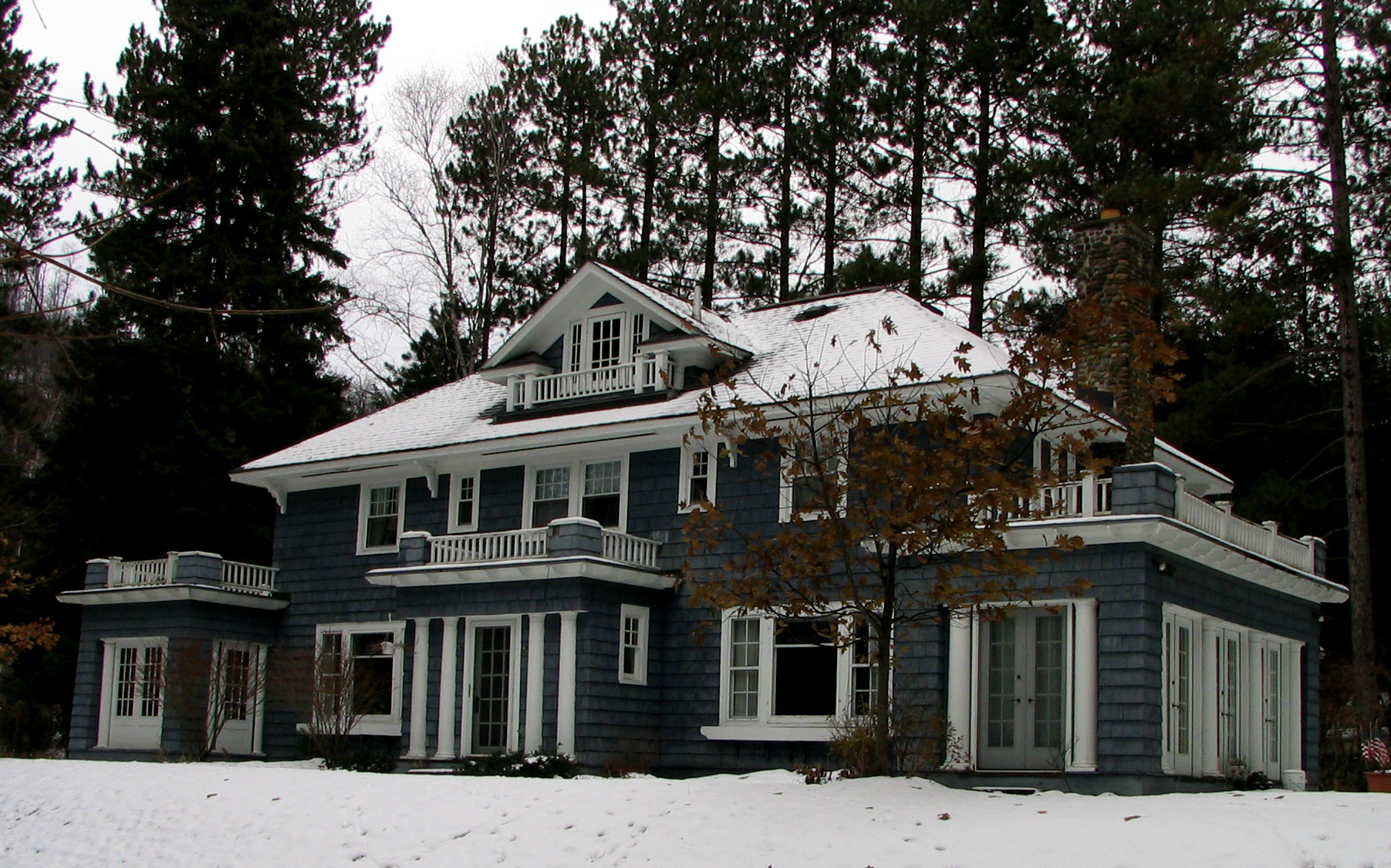
Mathewson's private "cure cottage" in Saranac Lake

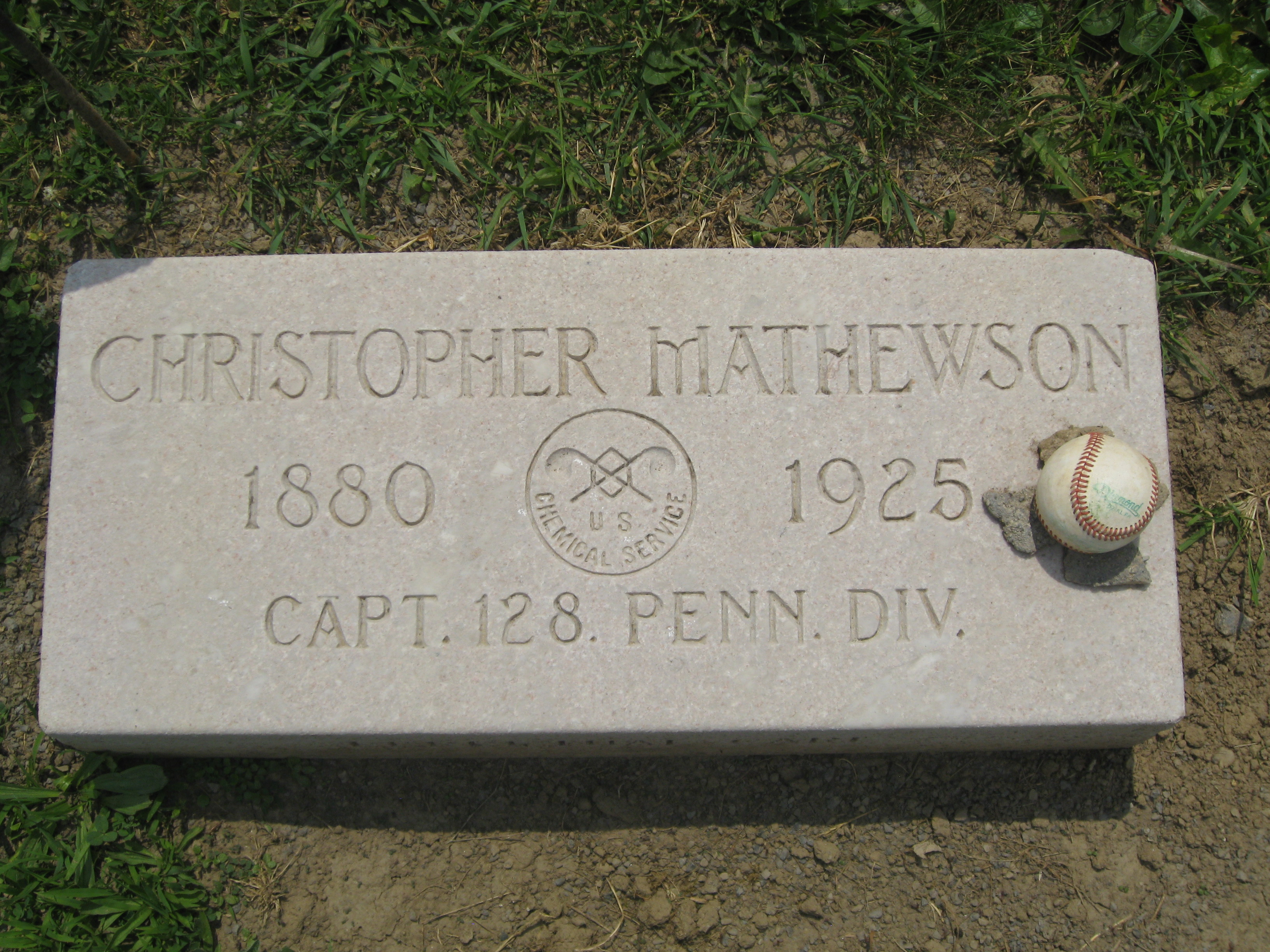
Mathewson's gravesite at Lewisburg Cemetery in Lewisburg, Pennsylvania

After contracting tuberculosis, Mathewson moved to the frigid climate of Saranac Lake, New York, in the Adirondack Mountains, where he sought treatment from Edward Livingston Trudeau at his renowned Adirondack Cottage Sanitarium. He died in Saranac Lake of tuberculosis on October 7, 1925. Mathewson is buried at Lewisburg Cemetery in Lewisburg, Pennsylvania, adjacent to Bucknell University. Members of the Pittsburgh Pirates and the Washington Senators wore black armbands during the 1925 World Series. Mathewson had died on the day the series began, October 7. According to Baseball, some of Mathewson's last words were to his wife: "Now Jane, I want you to go outside and have yourself a good cry. Don't make it a long one; this can't be helped."

- Christy Mathewson Day is celebrated as a holiday in his hometown of Factoryville, Pennsylvania, on the Saturday closest to his birthday.
- Christy Mathewson Day and Factoryville, Pennsylvania, are the subjects of the documentary, Christy Mathewson Day.
- Bucknell's football stadium is named "Christy Mathewson–Memorial Stadium".
- The baseball field at Keystone College is named "Christy Mathewson Field".
- Christy Mathewson Park in Factoryville is home to the community's Little League field, as well as basketball courts and other athletic facilities, public gardens, walking trails, and a picnic pavilion.
- The former Whittenton Ballfield in Taunton, Massachusetts, is named in memory of Christy Mathewson, who played for the Taunton team in the New England Baseball League before he joined the New York Giants.
- Mathewson is mentioned in the poem "Line-Up for Yesterday" by Ogden Nash. It says of Christy “M is for Matty, Who carried a charm In the form of an extra brain in his arm”
- F. Scott Fitzgerald refers to Christy Mathewson in his first novel, This Side of Paradise (1920).
- Jazz pianist Dave Frishberg, composer of several baseball-themed songs, wrote one called "Matty" for Mathewson.
- Mathewson is a central character in Eric Rolfe Greenberg's historical novel The Celebrant, which chronicles turn-of-the-century American life by weaving together Mathewson's story with the life of an immigrant Jewish family in New York. In 2002, the book was selected as one of the top 100 sports books of all time by Sports Illustrated.
- Mathewson's name and memory was honored in the last lines in the 1951 film, Angels in the Outfield.
- Since 1987, actor and writer Eddie Frierson has taken his award-winning one-man show, Matty: An Evening With Christy Mathewson, across the country, including Off-Broadway in New York and Mathewson's hometown of Factoryville, Pennsylvania. Frierson also formed The Mathewson Foundation, dedicated to the preservation of American History through baseball.

== Baseball honors ==
- In 1936, Mathewson was elected into the Baseball Hall of Fame as one of its first five inductees, along with Babe Ruth, Ty Cobb, Walter Johnson, and Honus Wagner. He was the only one of the five to be inducted posthumously.

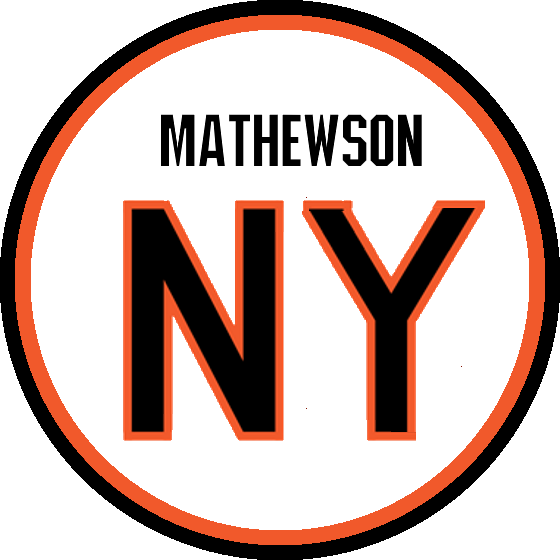
Christy Mathewson was honored alongside the retired numbers of the San Francisco Giants in 1986.

- His jersey, denoted as "NY", was retired by the Giants in 1986 and hangs in the left-field corner of Oracle Park. Uniform numbers were not used during the time when Mathewson played for the Giants.
- In 1999, he ranked number seven on The Sporting News' list of the 100 Greatest Baseball Players, the highest-ranking National League pitcher.
- ESPN selected his pitching performance in the 1905 World Series as the greatest playoff performance of all time.
- During World War II, a 422-foot (129 m) Liberty ship named in his honor, USS Christy Mathewson, was built in Richmond, California, in 1943.
- His plaque at the Baseball Hall of Fame says: "Greatest of all of the great pitchers in the 20th century's first quarter" and ends with the statement: "Matty was master of them all"

== Filmography ==
(compiled per IMDb)

- Christy Mathewson and the New York National League Team (1907)
- Athletics vs. Giants in the World's Championship Baseball Series of 1911 (1911)
- Breaking into the Big League (1913)
- The Giants-White Sox Tour (1914)
- The Universal Boy (1914)
- Love and Baseball (1914)
- Matty's Decision (1915)
- Animated Weekly, No.16 (1916)
- Animated Weekly, No.31 (1916)
- The Baseball Revue of 1917 (1917)

== Works ==
- Won in the Ninth (1910)
- Pitching in a Pinch; or, Baseball from the Inside (1912)
- Pitcher Pollock (1914)
- Catcher Craig (1915)
- First Base Faulkner (1916)
- Second Base Sloan (1917)
- "'Outguessing' the Batter". Pearson's Magazine. Vol. 25, no. 5. May 1911. pp. 568–575.

== See also ==
Line-Up for Yesterday

M is for Matty,
Who carried a charm
In the form of an extra
brain in his arm.

— Ogden Nash, Sport magazine (January 1949)
- List of Major League Baseball career ERA leaders
- List of Major League Baseball career FIP leaders
- List of Major League Baseball career wins leaders
- List of Major League Baseball annual saves leaders
- List of Major League Baseball annual shutout leaders
- List of Major League Baseball annual strikeout leaders
- List of Major League Baseball annual wins leaders
- List of Major League Baseball career strikeout leaders
- List of Major League Baseball no-hitters
- List of Major League Baseball player-managers
- Major League Baseball titles leaders
- Major League Baseball Triple Crown

Achievements
Preceded by Noodles Hahn; Jesse Tannehill	No-hitter pitcher July 15, 1901; June 13, 1905	Succeeded by Nixey Callahan; Weldon Henley
