= 1901 Philadelphia Athletic Club season =

American football team season

- Head coach: Blondy Wallace
- Home stadium: National League Park

Results
- Record: 4–2
- Division place: No divisions
- Playoffs: No playoffs

The 1901 Philadelphia Athletic Club season was the American football team's first season in existence. The team finished with an overall record of 4–2.

== Schedule ==
Game	Date	Opponent	Result	Source
1	October 19	at Conshohocken Tigers	W 6–0	
2	October 26	Orange Athletic Club	W 17–0	
3	November 2	Susquehanna	W 34–0	
4	November 5	Lafayette	W 23–0	
5	November 23	Homestead Library & Athletic Club (Note: Possible attempt to have a "Pennsylvania Pro Football Championship".)	L 0–18	
6	November 30	at Homestead Library & Athletic Club	L 5–6	
