= Fred Crolius =

American athlete and coach (1876–1960)

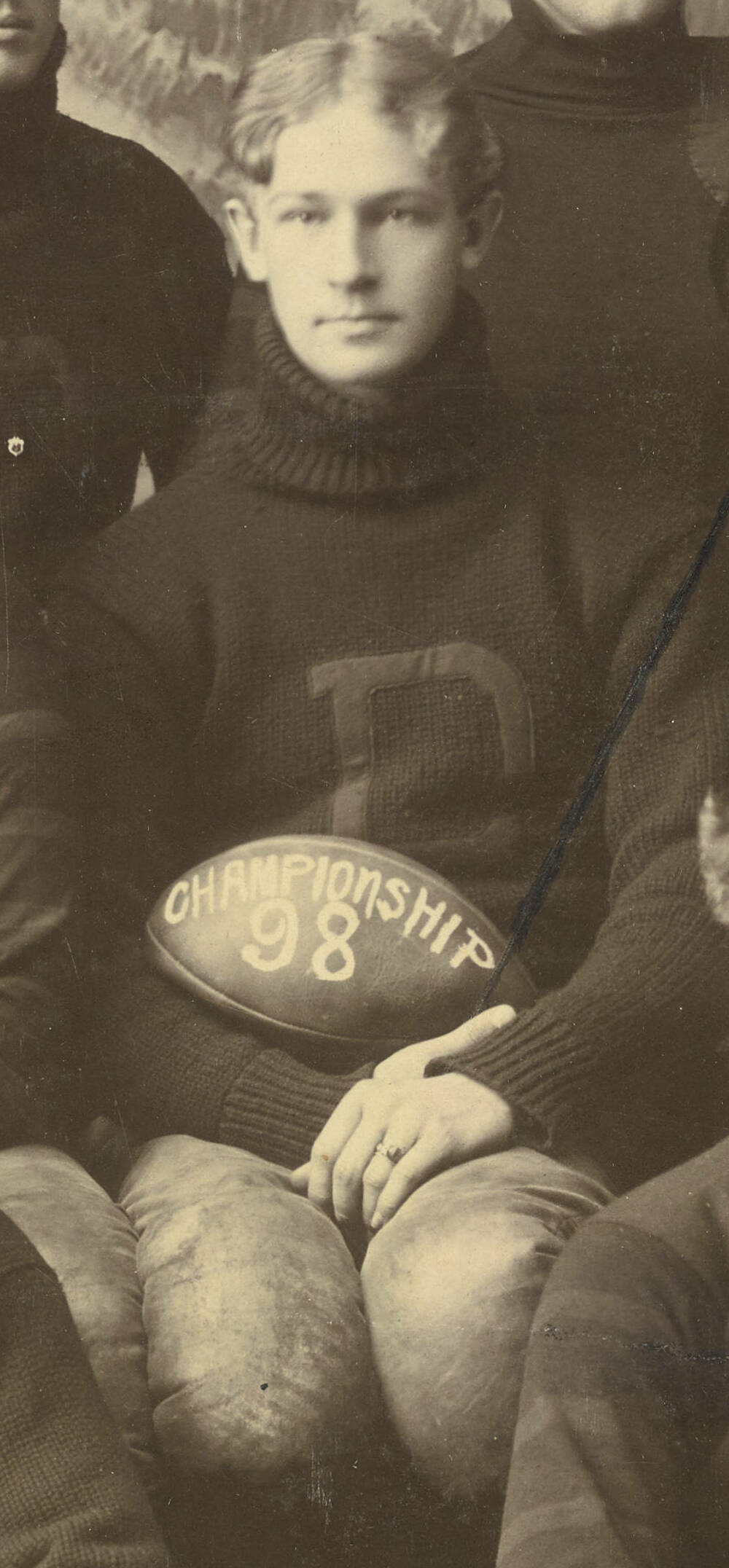
- Crolius on the 1898 Dartmouth football team

Biographical details
- Born: December 16, 1876; Jersey City, New Jersey, U.S.
- Died: August 25, 1960 (aged 84); Ormond Beach, Florida, U.S.

Playing career

Football
- 1895–1898: Dartmouth
- 1901: Homestead Library & Athletic Club
- 1902: Pittsburgh Stars

Baseball
- 1896–1899: Dartmouth
- 1901: Boston Beaneaters
- 1902: Pittsburgh Pirates
- Positions: Halfback (football); Outfielder (baseball)

Coaching career (HC unless noted)

Football
- 1899: Bowdoin
- 1900: MIT
- 1902: Western U. of Pennsylvania
- 1904–1911: Villanova

Baseball
- 1905–1911: Villanova

Head coaching record
- Overall: 22–50–6 (college football); 116–45–5 (college baseball)

Fred Crolius
- Outfielder
- Born: April 19, 1876; Jersey City, New Jersey
- Died: August 25, 1960 (aged 84); Ormond Beach, Florida
- Batted: Unknown Threw: Unknown

MLB debut
- April 19, 1901, for the Boston Beaneaters

Last MLB appearance
- August 30, 1902, for the Pittsburgh Pirates

MLB statistics
- At Bats: 238
- Hits: 58
- RBIs: 20
- Stats at Baseball Reference

Teams
- Player: Boston Beaneaters (1901); Pittsburgh Pirates (1902); Manager: Lancaster Red Roses (1906)

Frederick Joseph Crolius (December 16, 1876 – August 25, 1960) was an American football and baseball player and coach. He was the first player from Tufts University to play Major League Baseball. He was at Tufts in 1894, and at Dartmouth College, where he also played college football, from 1896 until 1899. He spent two years in majors with the Boston Beaneaters and the Pittsburgh Pirates. Crolius also played pro football with the independent Homestead Library & Athletic Club and the Pittsburgh Stars of the first National Football League. He later served as a coach of both sports after his playing career ended.

== Playing career ==
=== Baseball ===
At age 24, he broke into the big leagues on April 19, 1901, with the Boston Beaneaters. Crolius served as the team's fourth outfielder, playing mostly right field, where he backed up Jimmy Slagle. In 1901, his rookie year, he held a batting average of .240 with 1 home run and 13 RBIs. On July 22, 1901, Crolius had four hits which led to three runs scored in a 16–3 win over the Chicago Cubs.

In his second year in the majors, Crolius played for the Pittsburgh Pirates for nine games in 1902, before ending his baseball career. In 1906 he was made ineligible to play with any National club by the National Association of Professional Baseball Leagues due to a contract dispute with a minor league club from Toronto.

=== Football ===
In 1898 Fred Crolius was the captain of the Dartmouth football team. He was considered one of the best halfbacks in the game, but received little notice from the media, since Dartmouth was historically seen as having a weak football program.

In 1901 as a member of the Homestead Library & Athletic Club, located near Pittsburgh, Crolius served as the team's halfback. That year, he scored the tying touchdown against the Blondy Wallace's Philadelphia Athletic Club. Homestead won the game 6–5; touchdowns were worth five points in 1901.

In 1902, Crolius served as a halfback on the Pittsburgh Stars, a member of first National Football League that was suspected of being financed by baseball's Pittsburgh Pirates. During the 1902 season, the Stars won the league championship.

== Coaching career ==
=== Baseball ===
After his playing career, Crolius served as the coach the Villanova Wildcats baseball team from 1905 until 1911. While with Villanova, acquired a 116–45–5 record. He also served as the manager of the Lancaster Red Roses, where he guided the team to a 70–58 record in 1906.

=== Football ===
In 1899, he also served as the head coach for the Bowdoin College football team. He guided Bowdoin to a 2–6 record. In 1902, Crolius was the head coach of the Pittsburgh Panthers football team. That year the team racked up a 5–6–1 record. Crolius then coached the Villanova Wildcats to an 18–38–5 record between 1904 and 1911.

== Head coaching record ==
=== College football ===
Year	Team	Overall	Conference	Standing	Bowl/playoffs
Bowdoin Polar Bears (Independent) (1899)
1899	Bowdoin	2–6			
Bowdoin:		2–6			
Western University of Pennsylvania (Independent) (1902)
1902	Western University of Pennsylvania	5–6–1			
Western University of Pennsylvania:		5–6–1			
Villanova Wildcats (Independent) (1904–1911)
1904	Villanova	4–2–1			
1905	Villanova	3–7			
1906	Villanova	3–7			
1907	Villanova	1–5–1			
1908	Villanova	1–6			
1909	Villanova	3–2			
1910	Villanova	0–4–2			
1911	Villanova	0–5–1			
Villanova:		15–38–5			
Total:		22–50–6			

Sporting positions
Preceded by None	Lancaster Red Roses Managers; 1906	Succeeded by Pop Foster
