= William Chase Temple =

American businessman

Personal information
- Born: December 28, 1862; Starke, Florida, United States
- Died: January 9, 1917 (aged 54); Winter Park, Florida, United States

Career information
- College: Delaware State Normal School

Career history

Operations
- 1891–1893: Pittsburgh Pirates (President)
- 1898–1899: Duquesne C & A. C. (Manager)
- 1900–1901: Homestead L. & A. C. (Manager)

owner
- 1891–1893: Pittsburgh Pirates (part-owner)
- 1898–1899: Duquesne Country & A. C.
- 1900–1901: Homestead Library & A. C.
- 1902: Pittsburgh Stars (disputed)

Awards and highlights
- National Football League champion (1902) (disputed); 4x Western Pennsylvania Professional Football Circuit champion (1898, 1899, 1900, 1901); First sole owner of a professional American football team (1898); Established the Temple Cup (1894–1897) for champions of professional baseball in the National League, (only circuit in play at the time)

William Chase Temple (December 28, 1862 – January 9, 1917) was a coal, citrus, and lumber baron during the late 19th and early 20th centuries. He was also a part owner of the Pittsburgh Pirates in Pittsburgh, Pennsylvania from baseball's National League of Professional Baseball Clubs (later known worldwide as simply as the National League), established 1876. He also established the Temple Cup, a silver trophy awarded to the winner of a best-of-seven, post-season Major League Baseball championship series that was conducted for four seasons in the National League, from 1894 to 1897. He became the first sole owner of a professional American football team, in 1898.

== Business career ==
Temple was born in Starke, Florida. After moving to Delaware, he attended public schools in the city of Wilmington in the late 1860s and early 1870s, and graduated from the Delaware State Normal School in 1879. After graduation, he worked as an employee of Plankinton & Armour in Milwaukee, Wisconsin. In June 1880, he worked as a bank clerk for Alexander Mitchell Bank in Milwaukee. By 1883, Chase returned to Florida and began a lumber and timber company meeting with great success using the freight railroads being extended southward and soon became a "lumber baron". In 1884 and 1885 he is in Chicago working for William Plankinton and Warren S. Johnson at the company that would eventually be known as Johnson Controls. Between 1885 and 1889, he was a President and general manager of the Metropolitan Electrical Service Company in New York City. He later became a manager of Babcock & Wilcox Steam Boiler Company in Pittsburgh, Pennsylvania from 1890 to 1895. While in Pittsburgh, he was on the boards of directors of more than 20 numerous industrial, mining and financial companies of that rapidly industrializing city.

== Sports ==
From 1891 until 1893, Temple was the president and part-owner of the Pittsburgh Pirates franchise in the National League of Professional Baseball Clubs (later known as just the National League), founded 1876. In 1894, he donated a 30-inch-high silver cup, later called the Temple Cup to the National League. The first and second-place teams of the league would play in a seven-game, post season, series to determine the winner. The revenue from the series was to be split 65% to 35%; however, the players of the first series in 1894 decided to evenly split the money. However, after the series, the second place team New York Giants reportedly cheated some of the pennant winning first place team Baltimore Orioles players out of their money, immediately tainting the reputation of the championship Cup and prompting Temple to sell the Pirates in disgust, leaving baseball. It continued to be awarded in the NL until the 1897 season.

In 1898, Temple's interests expanded into football when he solely took over the team payments for the Duquesne Country and Athletic Club, a professional football team (named for the colonial French fort there at the Forks of the Ohio, later site of Pittsburgh) based in Pittsburgh from 1895 until 1900, becoming the first known individual football club owner. The Duquesnes had become the best professional team in Pennsylvania and, almost certainly, in the country. In 1900, A .C. Dinkey stole most of the Duquesne players, as well as Temple himself, for his rival Homestead Library & Athletic Club. Over the next two seasons (1900 and 1901), Homestead fielded the best professional football team in the country and did not lose a game.

In a 1902 controversy, Temple and the now majority owner of the Pittsburgh Pirates baseball team, Barney Dreyfuss, were suspected of being the secret owners to the Pittsburgh Stars team of the first original National Football League (two decades before the beginnings of the separate modern NFL). Temple denied any connection to the Stars' finances, as well as being the team's owner, in response to lawsuits against him after the end of the 1902 season (the outcomes of which went unpublished). The team's owner on paper, David Berry, insisted that he was the team's sole owner; as late as 1980, the Professional Football Researchers Association insisted, without clear evidence, that Temple must have bankrolled the team solely because Berry was not rich enough to do so (thus ignoring other potential sources of backing, such as the owners of the two Philadelphia teams in that league that had pushed for the Stars' creation in the first place). The Stars would go on to win the 1902 championship of this first NFL.

== Foundings ==
In 1909, Temple founded the Florida Citrus Exchange in 1909 and served as the organization's general manager from 1910 until 1913. During that time, Temple helped increased the business of the exchange from $200,000 to $5 million per year.

In 1915, he was named the first president of the South Florida Chamber of Commerce. He was also the first life member of the new American Automobile Association (AAA).

== Death ==
Temple died in 1917 in Winter Park, Florida, and is buried in the local Palm Cemetery. Prior to his death, he served as the town's mayor.

== Legacy ==
Temple Terrace, a city in northeastern Hillsborough County, in Florida was named after Temple. The "Temple orange" was named after him as well. William Chase Temple met and married Carrie Lee Wood, the daughter of major league baseball player, Jimmy Wood when they were both living in Chicago in 1884. The couple's daughter, Dorothy, would later marry major league pitcher, Del Mason.

== See also ==
- Carnegie Library of Homestead
- Pittsburgh Pirates
- Pittsburgh Stars
- Temple Cup
- Temple Terrace, Florida
