= 1901 Homestead Library & Athletic Club season =

American football team season

1901 Homestead Library & Athletic Club football
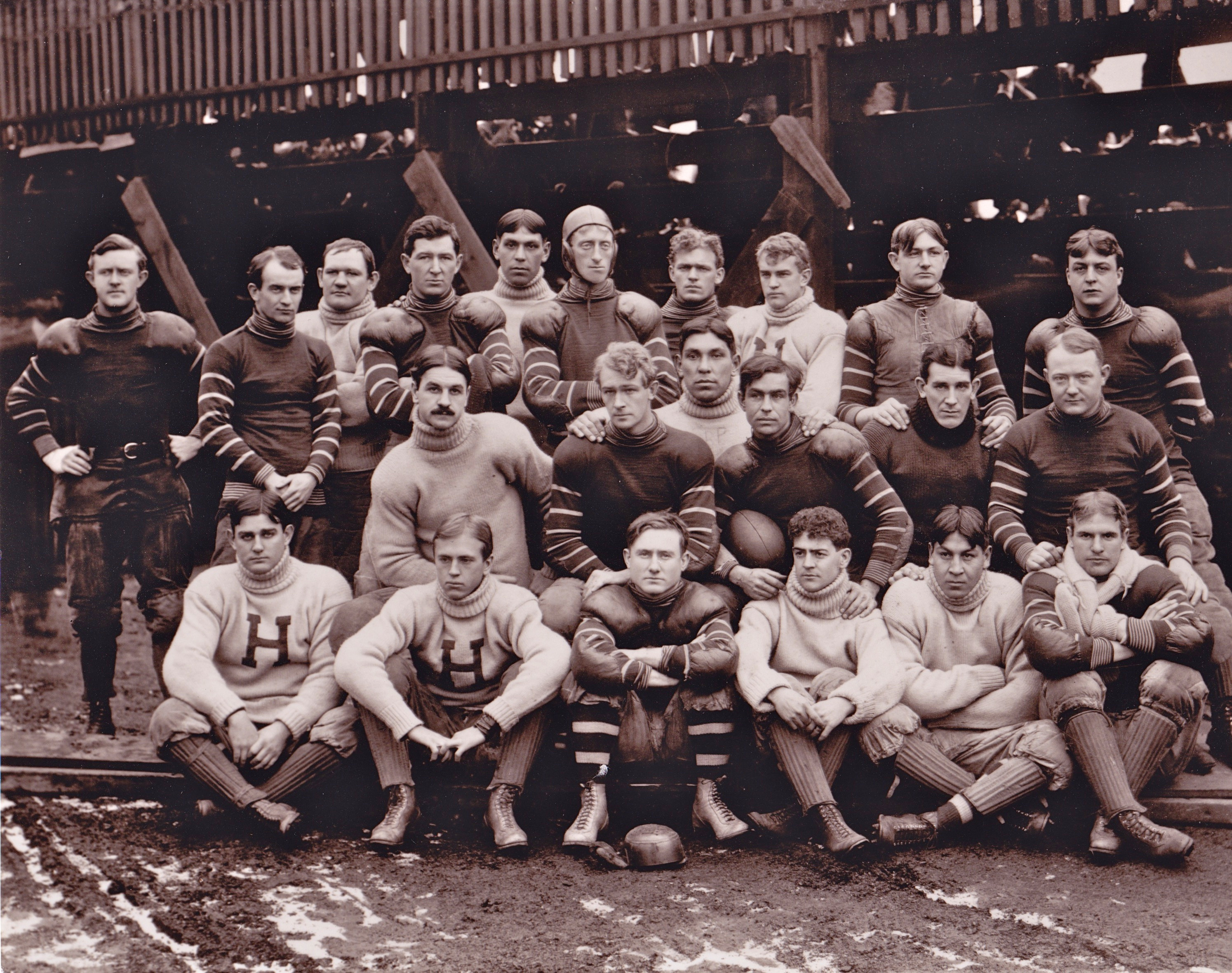

Professional football champion
- Record: 11–0
- Manager: Dave Fultz
- Head coach: Dave Fultz
- Captain: Dave Fultz
- Home field: Exposition Park

The 1901 Homestead Library & Athletic Club football team won the professional football championship of 1901. The team was affiliated with the Homestead Library & Athletic Club in Homestead, Pennsylvania, near Pittsburgh. The team featured a lineup of former college All-Americans paid by Pittsburgh Pirates' minority-owner William Chase Temple.

== Organization ==
In 1898, William Chase Temple took over the Duquesne Country and Athletic Club, becoming the first individual team owner in professional football. In 1900, most of the Duquesne players were hired by the Homestead Library & Athletic Club, by offering them higher salaries. Over the next two season (1900 and 1901), Homestead fielded the best professional football team in the country and did not lose a game.

In August 1901, former Brown University player Dave Fultz (1875–1959) was hired as the captain of the Homestead team. Fultz played right halfback for Homestead and also played professional baseball from 1898 to 1905. Playing for the Philadelphia Athletics in 1902, Fultz led the American League in runs scored (109) and was third in stolen bases (44).

In late September 1901, Fultz announced the makeup of the 1901 team. The payroll for the 1901 Homestead team was $25,000 a year, which was paid by William Chase Temple (owner of the Pittsburgh Pirates) and officers of the Carnegie Steel Company.

When Fultz first announced the lineup in late September, it included Pete Overfield (center from Penn), Bemus Pierce (left guard from the Carlisle Indian School), Art Poe (right end from Princeton), "Hoppy" Hunt (left end from Brown University), Daff Gammons (left halfback from Brown who also played baseball for the Boston Beaneaters in 1901), Fred Crolius (fullback from Dartmouth who played professional baseball and ranked fifth in the National League after being hit by a pitch 10 times in 1901), H. W. Maxson (quarterback from MIT), Frank Woodley (quarterback from Penn), Arthur Mosse from the University of Kansas (later a coach at Pittsburgh), Bob Shiring from Pittsburgh, McNulty (right guard from Notre Dame), Weinstein (right tackle from Pittsburgh), Nieman from the University of Cincinnati, Shields from Pittsburgh, and Perry Hale (fullback from Yale who also coached the Exeter football team and joined Homestead in mid-November after Exeter's last game).

Others who played for the 1901 Homestead team include Hawley Pierce (left tackle and brother of Bemus Pierce) and Willis "Little" Richardson (quarterback from Brown).

== Season summary ==
There was no organized professional football league in 1901, and most of Homestead's games were played against college football teams. Early in the season, Homestead played games against teams from Lalus, Ohio Medical College and Baltimore Medical College. Homestead won each of those games by wide margins, including a 42 to 0 margin over Baltimore Medical College on October 26, 1901.

On November 2, 1901, Homestead played its first game against a significant opponent, defeating the college team from Penn State by a score of 39 to 0.

On November 6, 1901, Homestead defeated the Brown University football team by a score of 34 to 0. The teams met at Exposition Park in Pittsburgh. Homestead's success in securing a match against one of the major college teams, from one of the Ivy League schools, was considered "the big card of the season" by Homestead management. The Brown faculty consented to allow the game in October. Homestead was a heavy favorite in the game, with one newspaper noting, "While a victory for Brown is too much to expect, the players certainly ought to have a very pleasant trip." The game's biggest play was a run of 110 yards by Homestead's left halfback, Gammons, who picked up the ball at the back of the goalposts after a blocked kick and "ran the entire length of the field". Brown was "outweighed and outclassed in all departments".

On November 16, 1901, Homestead played its second game against a major college team, defeating Lafayette 48 to 0 at Pittsburgh.

By late October 1901, Homestead and Philadelphia team was recognized as the strongest professional football teams in the United States, and a Philadelphia admirer of football offered up a cup to be awarded to the winner in a match between the two teams. The championship game between Homestead and Philadelphia was the subject of "lively" betting, as reported in the following newspaper story:

"At least $10,000 has already been bet in Pittsburg on the Philadelphia-Homestead football game ... Some days ago a sport in Pittsburg from Philadelphia with $3,000 to bet even that Philadelphia team would beat Homestead. He was prepared to bet even, and his money was taken so promptly that he wired Philadelphia for another trunkful of coin. About $2,500 arrived Monday and friends of the Homestead team were ready at the station to meet it. There is yet a lot of loose money to bet that Homestead beats the Quakers and there is a good amount to bet at decent odds that Philadelphia does not score."

On November 23, 1901, Homestead defeated the Blondy Wallace's Philadelphia professionals for "the athletic championship of the United States." The game was played at the Philadelphia park, and Homestead won by a score of 18 to 0. Newspaper accounts indicate that Philadelphia "was completely outplayed and never menaced the Homestead goal." Another account reported that the Philadelphia team appeared to be in poor physical condition and was unable to gain ground consistently." Homestead gained most of its yardage through the Philadelphia line, directing most of its plays at tackle and center. The New York Times reported on the game as follows:

"Against the well-trained, concerted team work of Homestead they were like so many pigmies. Their line could not hold the fast onslaught of the Western contingent, and after the first ten minutes of play a lack of good physical condition began to assert itself. ... The 5,000 spectators present shivered through thirty minute halves and at no time during the game was a real opportunity offered to get enthusiastic over the work of Wallace's [Philadelphia's captain] team. It was an eleven made up of stars against well-trained team work, and the latter triumphed."

While the Philadelphia Inquirer reported that at least one of Homestead's scores was the result of an error by the umpire, they agreed Homestead was the better team: "The Homestead line was like a stone wall, and only occasionally was Philadelphia able to gain around the ends. Homestead played a team of giants, all in perfect condition, and with a system of team play developed to the highest possible perfection."

On November 28, 1901, Homestead played a Thanksgiving Day game against the college team from Washington & Jefferson. Homestead won the game 42 to 0 at Pittsburgh.

On November 30, 1901, Homestead finished the season with a rematch against Philadelphia, in a game played two days after the Washington & Jefferson game. Two of Homestead's starters, Hawley Pierce and Pete Overfield, were unable to play due to injuries, and captain Dave Fultz was knocked unconscious in the first half. Homestead gave up a touchdown in the first half, the first points scored against them in 1901. But they came back in the second half and won by a score of 6 to 5.

== Public and press response ==
After Homestead won the professional football championship, The Philadelphia Inquirer wrote the following editorial expressing pride in the accomplishments of Pennsylvania's professional football teams: "It is a curious fact, apropos of the constant charge that Pennsylvania is now a slow state, that the two greatest professional football teams in the country, Philadelphia and Homestead, should have found a spontaneous sort of existence within the Keystone limits, and without fuss or flurry of any kind, be ready to meet all comers."

Despite their success on the field, the 1901 Homestead team was not a financial success, as "the winningest team in pro football was a financial loser again, dropping $8,000."

== Birthplace of the NFL ==
The success of the 1901 Homestead team also spurred interest in the formation of a nationwide professional football league. One writer opined that Homestead, though an "exceptionally strong organization", were actually too strong a team for the best box office results, as "its games were won too easily".

Pittsburgh baseball officials Harry Pulliam and Barney Dreyfuss proposed a league with teams in Chicago, Pittsburgh, Philadelphia, Boston and New York. In December 1901, Pulliam told a reporter:

"There were 7,000 persons out to see the Homestead and Philadelphia teams play ... and I believe that strong teams evenly matched in the cities named will appeal to the average football crank. Enough graduates and men who are taking post graduate courses at colleges can be found to make strong teams. They would be men who have learned the game at the colleges, but older and stronger, and would have the advantage of playing together year after year more than college players."

In 1902, Dreyfuss formed the first National Football League, consisting of three teams made up in large part of former Homestead players.

== Season schedule ==
Date	Opponent	Site	Result	Attendance
October 5	Juniata A.C. (Altoona)	Exposition Park; Allegheny City, PA	W 45–0	
October 12	James F. Lalus (East End)	Exposition Park; Allegheny City, PA	W 24–5	
October 19	Ohio Medical	Exposition Park; Allegheny City, PA	W 28–0	
October 26	Baltimore Medical College	Exposition Park; Allegheny City, PA	W 42–0	
November 2	Penn State	Exposition Park; Allegheny City, PA	W 39–0	
November 5	Brown	Exposition Park; Allegheny City, PA	W 34–0	
November 9	James F. Lalus	Steel Works Park; Homestead, PA	W 17–2	
November 16	Lafayette	Exposition Park; Allegheny City, PA	W 48–0	
November 23	Philadelphia A.C.	National League Park; Philadelphia, PA	W 18–0	
November 28	Washington & Jefferson	Exposition Park; Allegheny City, PA	W 12–0	4,200
November 30	Philadelphia A.C.	Exposition Park; Allegheny City, PA	W 6–5	
