= National Football League (1902) =

American professional football league based in Pennsylvania (1902)

- National Football League (1902) (Pennsylvania)
- Sport: American football
- Founded: 1902
- Founder: John Rogers, Ben Shibe, Dave Berry
- Folded: 1902
- President: Dave Berry
- No. of teams: 3
- Country: United States
- Last champion: Pittsburgh Stars

The first National Football League (NFL) was the first attempt at forming a national professional American football league in 1902. This league has no ties with the modern National Football League. In fact the league was only composed of teams from Pennsylvania, which meant it was actually regional, despite having locations in the two largest cities in Pennsylvania. Two of the teams were based in Philadelphia, while the third was based in Pittsburgh. This NFL was a curious mixture of football players and baseball players who adapted to playing football. Future Baseball Hall of Famer Rube Waddell was briefly with the Philadelphia Athletics, and pitcher Christy Mathewson a fullback for Pittsburgh. Two of the three teams were owned by the Philadelphia Phillies and Philadelphia Athletics, with the third team suspected of being owned by the Pittsburgh Pirates. The league folded after the 1902 season.

== History ==
=== Founding ===
League President, David J. Berry, who also managed the Pittsburgh Stars

Ironically the roots of the league lay with baseball, not football. It began as a part of the baseball wars between the National League and the new American League that began in 1901. In Philadelphia the AL's Athletics lured several of the NL's Phillies from their contracts, only to lose them through court action. When Phillies owner John Rogers decided to start a football team, the Athletics followed suit. A's owner Ben Shibe fielded a team made up of several baseball players as well as some local football talent. He appointed his baseball manager Connie Mack as the team's general manager and named former University of Pennsylvania football player Charles "Blondy" Wallace as the team's coach. Each Philadelphia team was named after their respective baseball clubs and became the Athletics and Philadelphia Phillies.

However, both Rogers and Shibe knew that to lay claim (to what they hoped would be) the "World Championship"; they had to play a team from Pittsburgh, which was the focal point of football at the time. They called on pro football promoter Dave Berry, and a Pittsburgh team was soon formed around a championship team from Homestead. This team was named the Stars, after the number of football players on the team who were considered football stars during the era. The team was owned and operated by Berry, the former manager of the Latrobe Athletic Association. However many historians believe that due to Berry's limited wealth and the amount of talent on team, that Pittsburgh Pirates owner Barney Dreyfuss and/or Pirates president William Chase Temple (who briefly owned other pro football teams in Pittsburgh only to see them fail in short fashion) may have secretly financed the team, a statement both vehemently denied. Several players did attempt to sue Temple after the season claiming that Temple owed them money for playing for the Stars, but the outcome of those suits was never published. The first league had no bylaws, no offices and no schedule-making powers. Having three of the top professional football teams in the country helped make up for those shortfalls.

These three teams are all that made up the 1902 NFL. Because of the animosity that existed between Philadelphia's Shibe and Rogers, Dave Berry was picked to the league's president. Attempts were initially made to expand the league outside of Pennsylvania into other major cities like Chicago and New York City. Investors in neither city were interested in joining the league at the time.

=== 1902 season ===
With all the baseball involvement, training did not get underway for the football teams until September 29, 1902, with the season was scheduled to open a week later on October 4. However, most of the players were already in shape. Besides the baseball players, many of the others had jobs that kept them in good condition. For example, Pittsburgh halfback Artie Miller, came in after a summer's lumberjacking in the Wisconsin woods. To make the preseason even less stressful, the average football team in 1902 only used about a half-dozen plays and they were all standard.

The NFL reputedly used a legal forward pass four years before it became legal at the college level. Bosey Reiter, the Athletics' passing back, later testified that through trial and error, an early attempt to create an effective underhand forward pass was developed by his teammate Hawley Pierce, but that Reiter's arms were too short to execute it effectively; Reiter then experimented with an overhand form similar to the modern throwing motion, which was more effective for him. The exact rules the NFL used for forward passing are no longer known; the strategy, if it was used, was only done so sparingly, and the Professional Football Researchers Association made no mention of it in its summary of the league's history. The PFRA instead stated that the NFL relied on a downfield game driven by onside scrimmage kicks: any player who was behind the kicker at the time the ball was kicked could legally recover it and maintain possession for his team. Reiter would have a substantial role in the development of the forward pass as a college coach once the maneuver was legalized.

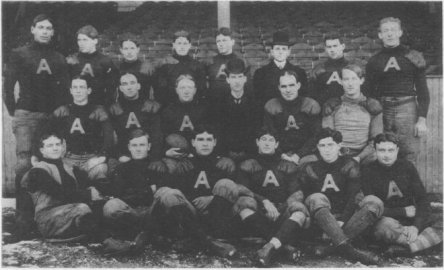
The Philadelphia Athletics of the 1902 National Football League

The league played all of its games on Saturdays, since there were no Sunday sports events according to Pennsylvania blue laws in 1902. The Pittsburgh team played all of its home games at the North Shore Coliseum (then the home of the Western Unisversity of Pennsylvania football team), while the two Philadelphia teams used their own respective baseball stadiums, Columbia Park and the Baker Bowl, for home games. Each team played two games against each of other two teams. When they were not playing each other, the teams played various teams from colleges and athletic clubs from Pennsylvania and southern New York state.

On Thanksgiving Day 1902, Berry billed a game between the Stars and the Athletics as being for the championship of the National Football League. The Athletics had split on the season with the Phillies, as had Pittsburgh. Although a Philadelphia victory on Thanksgiving would give the A's the championship hands down, a win by the Stars could tie the league race tighter. Mack readied his A's for the big game by playing an exhibition tour through northern Pennsylvania and southern New York. In Elmira, New York the Athletics joined in the first night game in pro football history. Lights were set up along the sidelines and giant searchlights glared from behind the goal posts. The A's won the game 39–0 over the Kanaweola Athletic Club.

=== 1902 championship first attempt ===
When Mack agreed to Berry's championship game, he was promised $2,000 for his team's participation. However, when he arrived in Pittsburgh, he saw that the stands were pretty much empty and since his $2,000 came from the ticket sales at the gate, it looked as if he would not be paid his $2,000 and his team would be stranded, with no money, in Pittsburgh. Therefore, seeing no reason to take the field, Mack refused to play until his team was paid their promised share of the gate, $2,000. It looked as if the game would not be played. However Mack received a check for $2,000 from William Corey, the head of Carnegie Steel, who impatiently wanted to see the game, and the game soon began. Corey got his money's worth, if he liked evenly matched games. Both teams played at their best to a scoreless tie. It was a fair verdict, but Berry's "championship game" had not decided anything.

=== 1902 championship ===
Another championship game was soon planned between Berry and Mack. Because of a lack of funds Berry almost ended up canceling the game. However, he later promised to his players they would all share equally in Saturday's game, which was sure to be a sell-out. After some complaints were addressed, everything was set. The crowd was a little better on Saturday, but not much. About 2,000 fans showed up, and the players knew before the game began that they were going to come up short at pay time. The game looked like it might once again end in a tie. However a late touchdown by Ellis and another by Artie Miller led Pittsburgh to an 11–0 win over the Athletics.

=== Afterwards ===
Most of the players tried it again with Franklin or Canton or Massillon in the next few years. The Philadelphia Athletics went home and beat the Phillies to wrap up second place and a city championship.

Meanwhile, several members of the Athletics and the Phillies went on to play in the first World Series of Pro football on a team erroneously named "New York" at Madison Square Garden (the "error" was deliberate as the tournament's founder felt that the combined team was the best in the event, and bestowed upon them home field advantage for the tournament). New York and Syracuse AC played in the first indoor football game in front of 3,000 spectators, on December 28, 1902. Syracuse, with Glenn Scobey "Pop" Warner at offensive guard, won the game 6–0 and went on to win the tournament.

The league quietly folded, and the war between the baseball leagues was resolved the next spring. While the NFL thrived in Philadelphia, it never took hold in Pittsburgh, where professional football had already had its moment in the spotlight come and go over the previous decade. Public relations errors by Berry resulted in a lukewarm reaction to the franchise, particularly his decision to host the Stars' practices in Greenbsurg to help the Stars players avoid Pittsburgh's polluted air of the era, which deprived Pittsburgh residents of the ability to watch the Stars' practices for free; as a result, the Stars' championship went largely ignored in Pittsburgh. Many Pittsburghers followed their local athletic clubs and colleges more than the Stars. In fact the Washington and Jefferson Presidents football team had a much greater following than the Stars. Professional ice hockey would become the sport of the moment in the early to mid-1900s (decade) as the Western Pennsylvania Hockey League began hiring professional players.

The league had been slightly ahead of its time; it would not be until 1920 that the idea for a true "National Football League" would come to be accepted.

=== Controversy ===
With the win, A's players decided to call the Stars game an exhibition, and declared themselves the champs. However, the team had agreed to that season-ending championship game against Pittsburgh the Saturday after Thanksgiving, and they had lost it. This was recognized by all parties at the time as the championship game. Each team carried a record of 2–2 for league play. Pittsburgh had by far the better point ratio, scoring 39 points to their opponents' 22. Both the Athletics and the Phillies gave up more points than they scored in their league games. Finally Dave Berry used his power as league president and named his Stars the 1902 champions.

== Final standings ==
Team	Games	Wins	Losses	Ties	Pts For	Pts Against	%
Pittsburgh Stars	6	3	2	1	39	22	.600
Philadelphia Athletics	6	3	2	1	34	44	.600
Philadelphia Phillies	6	3	3	0	41	34	.500

== 1917 restart attempt ==
In 1917, an unnamed representative from a professional football club in Detroit attempted to start a professional football league, based on the model of the 1902 NFL. The plan called for the league to be backed by Major League Baseball, with the teams to be based in Chicago, New York City, Detroit, Pittsburgh, Indianapolis, Cleveland and Columbus, Ohio. Several of these metropolitan areas and cities had existing professional clubs in the Ohio League and various other "major regional" leagues of the era, such as the Detroit Heralds, Columbus Panhandles, and the McKeesport Olympics (in the Pittsburgh metro area). Cleveland, though it did not have an Ohio League team at the time, was not very far away from the Northeast Ohio trifecta of dominant pro football teams: the Canton Bulldogs, Akron Pros and Massillon Tigers. Philadelphia also had a strong semi-pro football circuit, which included (among other teams) the Union Club of Phoenixville, 30 miles northeast of Philadelphia.

Under the proposal, teams would then begin play immediately after baseball season concluded and continue as long "as the weather is favorable." To build name recognition, it was determined that those baseball players with sufficient football skill would be featured on league rosters with the remaining slots filled by ex-college football players. The games would be played in the baseball parks such as Forbes Field, Comiskey Park, the Polo Grounds and Navin Field.

The unnamed agent pitched the idea to Frank Navin, the owner of Detroit Tigers, and Charles Comiskey, the owner of the Chicago White Sox. Comiskey told reporters, "If pro football can be made to pay it will be an answer to a problem that has confronted baseball owners since the game started. For years we have been going along using our ballparks three months in a year, only to see the property lie idle the other nine months." He then stated that he would take the upcoming week to think over the proposal.

The story was only closely examined by only two national newspapers, the Philadelphia Inquirer and Los Angeles Times. On January 4, 1917, an editorial in the Inquirer declared the idea "no good in Philadelphia" and supported their conclusion by citing a similar idea of fifteen years earlier, which was "long remembered as a failure". The commentary ended with a statement that college football was too big and would always draw a bigger crowd than the pro game. Meanwhile, the Los Angeles Times featured two articles on the pros and cons of a professional football league. Times columnist Harry A. Williams supported the idea of a league. However, he felt that the league would have a better chance by teaming up with teams associated with the Pacific Coast League instead of major league baseball, due to the warmer weather. The opposing opinion was given by Warren Bovard, the manager of the University of Southern California football team, who stated that football was tailored for colleges and not professional play. He then stated that pro football would have to rely on all-star games, which draw well at first, but fail to hold any long-term interest. The proposal was never mentioned in any published reports afterward.

In April 1917, the United States entered World War I; at war's end, a flu pandemic swept the world, and virtually all of the professional football teams in the country shut down or drastically scaled back operations. The modern National Football League, formed as a confederation of the existing professional football clubs and with no baseball backing, was established three years later in 1920. Comiskey successfully convinced the NFL's then-Racine Cardinals to move to Comiskey Park in 1922.
