= Carnegie Library of Homestead =

Public library with a music hall in Munhall, Pennsylvania

Coordinates: 40°24′25.49″N 79°54′10.72″W

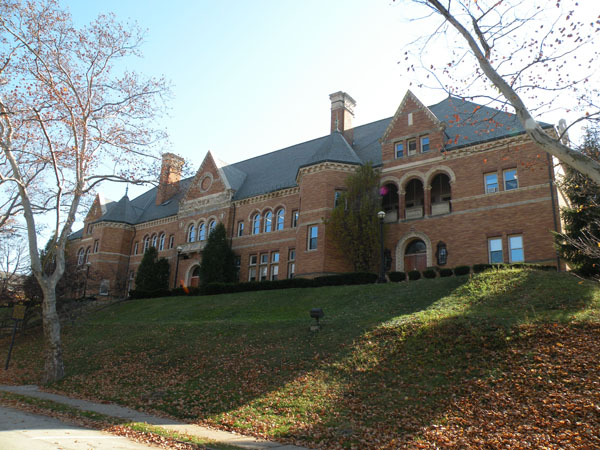
- Location: 510 East 10th Ave; Munhall, PA 15120-1910, United States
- Type: Public
- Established: November 5, 1898

Collection
- Size: 34,000

Other information
- Website: Library Website

Pittsburgh Landmark – PHLF
- Designated: 1989

The Carnegie Library of Homestead is a public library in Munhall, Pennsylvania founded by Andrew Carnegie in 1898.

It is one of 2,509 Carnegie libraries worldwide, 1,689 of which were built in the United States. It was the sixth library commissioned by Carnegie in the U.S. and the seventh to open.^{1} Completed in November 1898, it is the third oldest Carnegie library in continuous operation in its original structure in the U.S. after the Main Branch and Lawrenceville Branch of Pittsburgh.^{2} The library is an independent entity; it is not a "branch" of the Carnegie Library of Pittsburgh, which operates one main facility and 19 branches within the city of Pittsburgh.

The building houses a library with a collection of over 34,000, the 1,047-seat "Carnegie Library Music Hall" and an athletic club with a heated indoor pool.

== History ==
The library was constructed on a hill in Mifflin Township, Pennsylvania (part of which became today's borough of Munhall), overlooking Homestead and the Homestead Steel Works. This was the site of an 1892 labor strike in which Pinkerton agents fought with union workers, resulting in 16 deaths.

A library had been under consideration for several years before the strike, but unlike those at Carnegie's Homestead plant, laborers at the Edgar Thomson Works in Braddock had capitulated to his wage concession demands in 1887, and the Carnegie Free Library of Braddock was founded the following year. "Our works at Homestead are not to us as our works at Edgar Thomson. Our men there are not partners", Carnegie said.

The $300,000 project was ground-broken in April 1896. Pittsburgh architects Frank Alden and Alfred Harlow designed the French Renaissance facility, which was 220 by 132 feet. Contractor William Miller and Sons used Pompeian brick.

Renovations and modifications have not altered the original physical arrangement of the building, which comprises three separate facilities — a library, music hall, and athletic club — under one roof.

While Carnegie required communities to use public funds to subsidize the operation of his libraries, Homestead was one of the few exceptions. Operation of the libraries in Braddock, Homestead, and Duquesne were initially funded by Carnegie's plants in those towns. After selling his business to U.S. Steel in 1901, Carnegie established a $1 million trust to support the three facilities. In the 1960s, the Braddock and Duquesne libraries were turned over to the school districts in those communities by the Board of the Endowment for the Monongahela Valley. The Homestead Library is now the sole beneficiary of Carnegie's gift.

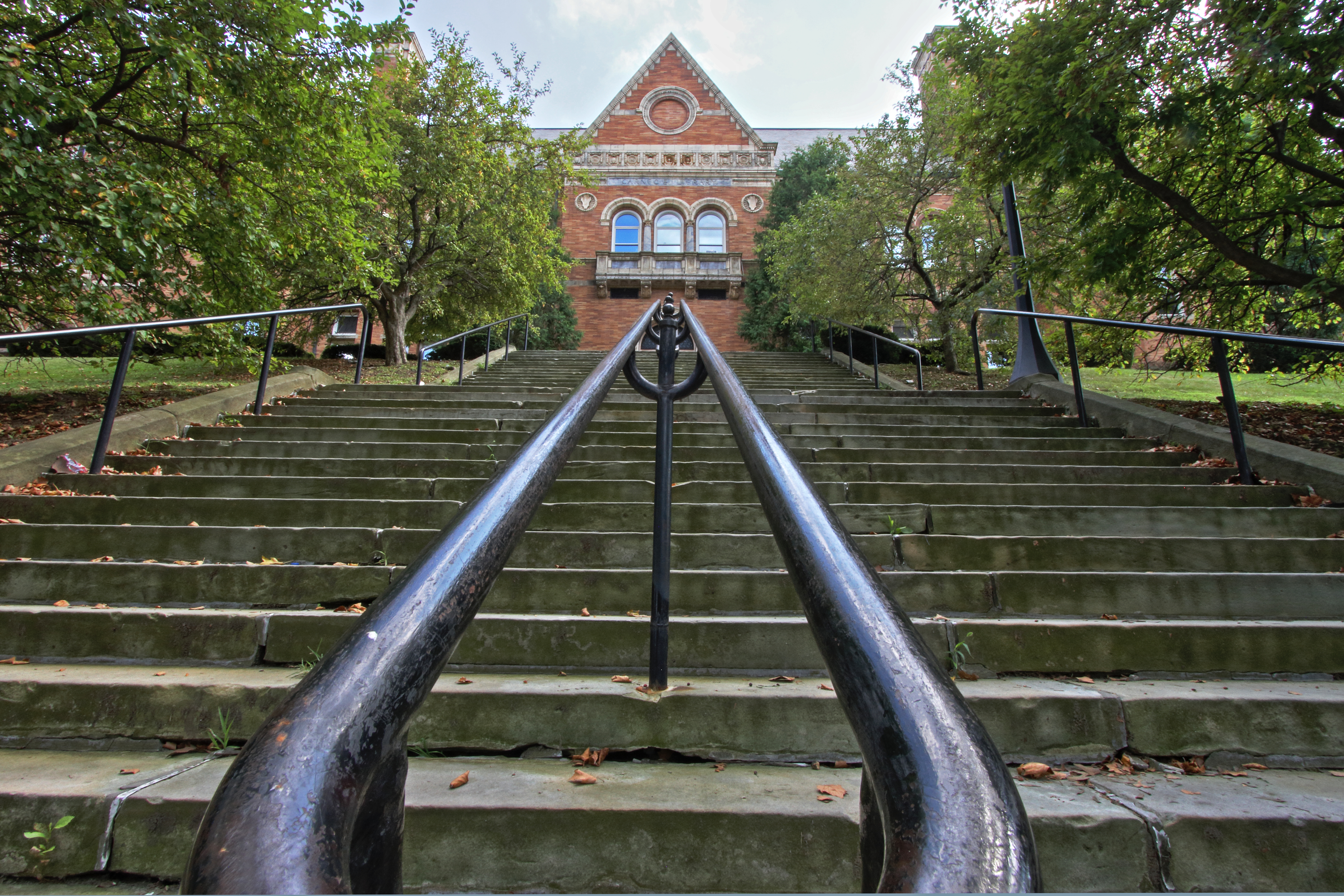
Main Entrance Staircase of the Library

USX Corporation, the successor to U.S. Steel, continued to provide major support until 1988, when the corporation terminated its regular donations and the Borough of Munhall assumed responsibility for the library. Despite the closing of the Homestead Steel Works two years earlier and the precipitous decline in employment and tax revenue, the library remained open and operational with grants secured by community volunteers and the investment income from Carnegie's endowment. When the financial crash of 2008 reduced the endowment's value by $300,000, the library board furloughed its executive employees and assumed management responsibilities rather than cut services. Fundraising efforts, revenue from athletic club memberships, music hall rentals, and concession sales have maintained the library's viability.

In 2017, the library launched a 10-year capital renovation campaign to restore areas in the building, preserving its historical features with modernized amenities. New locker rooms and classrooms were added to the lower level; an elevator was installed in the music hall and a welcome center in the gymnasium. The next phase is renovating the library and meeting rooms and starting the seat replacement project in the music hall.

== Homestead Library & Athletic Club ==
In the early 20th century, the Homestead Library & Athletic Club football team, composed of many former star Ivy League players, was considered one of the top semi-professional teams in the country. Hall of Famer Rube Waddell played for the club's baseball team. The amateur teams at the library also won national championships in wrestling and track & field.

In the 1920s and 1930s, four Olympians trained in the library's swimming pool. Susan Laird swam in 1928, winning a gold medal with the 4 × 100 meter freestyle relay team; Josephine McKim won a bronze medal in 1928 and gold in 1932; Anna Mae Gorman competed in the 1932 Summer Olympics at age 16; and Lenore Kight won silver in 1932 and a bronze in 1936. Gorman first swam in 1927 while on vacation. When she returned to Homestead, she purchased a three-month membership at the library and pool for $1. At age 92 in 2008, Gorman still swam at the library.

The building has rightfully in the center as the focus 'The Library'-- Music Hall upon the right and the Working Man's Club upon the left. These three foundations from which healing waters are to flow for the Instruction, Entertainment and Happiness of the people. Recreation of the working man has an important bearing upon his character and development as his hours of work.
—Andrew Carnegie on the Homestead Library

== See also ==
- 1899 Homestead Library & Athletic Club season
- 1900 Homestead Library & Athletic Club season
- 1901 Homestead Library & Athletic Club season

== Notes ==
1.It opened November 5, 1898. The Lawrenceville Branch of Carnegie Library of Pittsburgh was commissioned together with the Pittsburgh Main Branch in 1890 (the third commissioned in the U.S.) and opened six months earlier than the Homestead Library.
2.The Carnegie Free Library of Braddock, founded in 1888, was closed from 1974 to 1983 due to under-funding and structural deficiencies. The Carnegie Free Library of Allegheny, now a branch of the Carnegie Library of Pittsburgh, was completed in 1890. Damaged in a 2006 lightning strike, the library moved to a new building in 2008. Carnegie had previously provided two libraries in his native Scotland.

== Gallery ==
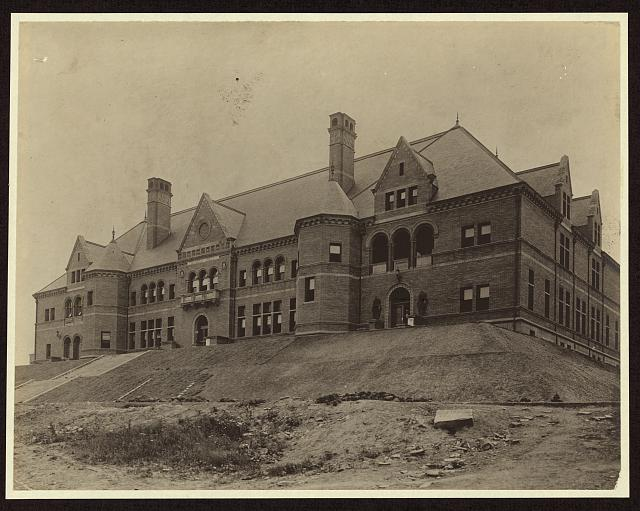
Library in 1900

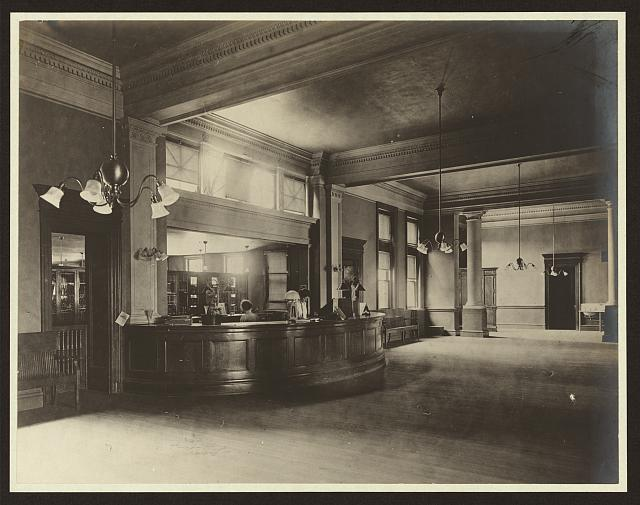
Delivery room

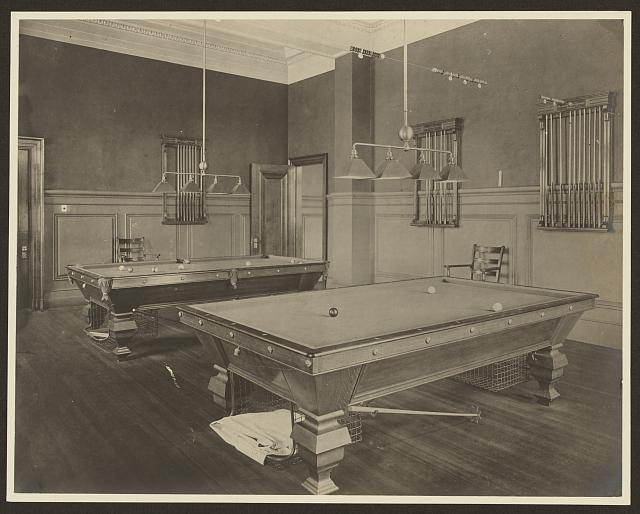
Billiard hall

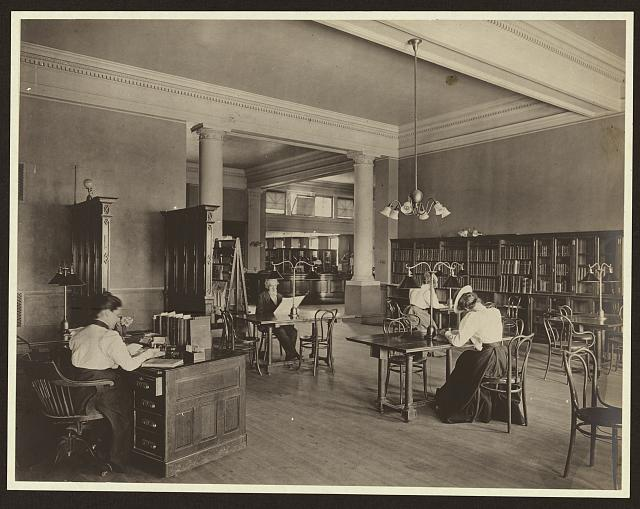
Adult reading room

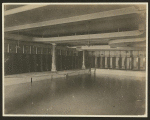
Swimming pool

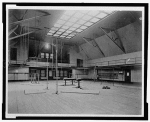
Gymnasium
