= American football in Western Pennsylvania =

American football in Western Pennsylvania, including Pittsburgh and its surrounding areas, has a history dating back to the early development of the sport. The region has established traditions in high school, college and professional football. Its National Football League (NFL) team, the Pittsburgh Steelers, has a substantial following.[1][2][3][4] The region has also produced several NFL quarterbacks, earning it the nickname "Cradle of Quarterbacks".[5][6]

== Early years ==
=== Professional ===
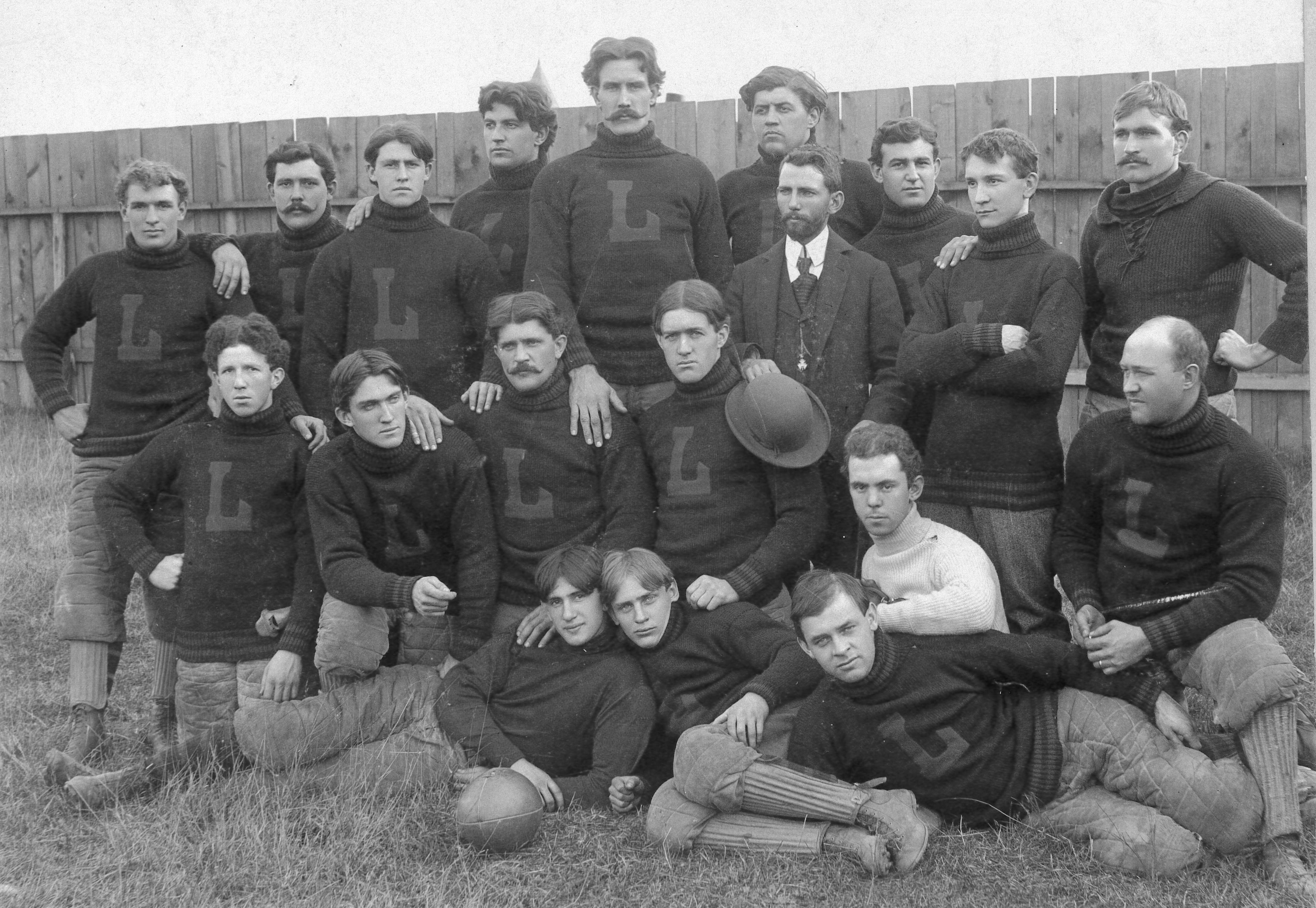
1897 Latrobe Athletic Association football team: The first entirely professional team to play an entire season

In the early 20th century, football began to catch on in the general population of the United States and was the subject of intense competition and rivalry, albeit of a localized nature. Although payments to players were considered unsporting and dishonorable at the time, a Pittsburgh area club, the Allegheny Athletic Association, of the unofficial western Pennsylvania football circuit, surreptitiously hired former Yale All-American guard Pudge Heffelfinger. On November 12, 1892, Heffelfinger became the first known professional football player. He was paid $500 to play in a game against the Pittsburgh Athletic Club. Heffelfinger picked up a Pittsburgh fumble and ran 35 yards for a touchdown, winning the game 4–0 for Allegheny. Although observers held suspicions, the payment remained a secret for years.

A year later, Ben "Sport" Donnelly became the first professional football coach, when he headed up the Allegheny Athletic Association team. Meanwhile, a player assumed to be Grant Dibert of the Pittsburgh Athletic Club, signed the first known pro football contract, which covered all of the club's games for the 1893 season.

On September 3, 1895, the first wholly professional game was played, in Latrobe, Pennsylvania, between the Latrobe Athletic Association and the Jeannette Athletic Club. Latrobe won the contest 12–0. During this game, Latrobe's quarterback, John Brallier became the first player to openly admit to being paid to play football. He was paid $10 plus expenses to play. In 1897, the Latrobe Athletic Association paid all of its players for the whole season, becoming the first fully professional football team.

From 1890 until 1900, nearby Greensburg, Pennsylvania, was the home of the Greensburg Athletic Association. The team began as an amateur football club in 1890 and was composed primarily of locals before several paid players were added for 1895. In 1894 it was discovered that the team had secretly paid formerly Indiana Normal (now Indiana University of Pennsylvania) player, Lawson Fiscus, to play football and retained his services on salary. The team was the chief rival of another early professional football team, the Latrobe Athletic Association. Aside from Fiscus, the Greensburg Athletic Association included several of the era's top players, such as: Charlie Atherton, George Barclay, Ross Fiscus, Jack Gass, Arthur McFarland, Charles Rinehart, Isaac Seneca and Adam Martin Wyant. Several of these players revolutionized the game during their playing careers. Charlie Atherton is credited with inventing the place kick, and George Barclay invented the first-ever football helmet. Meanwhile, Isaac Seneca became the first Native-American to earn All-American honors and Adam Wyant was the first professional football player to become a United States Congressman.

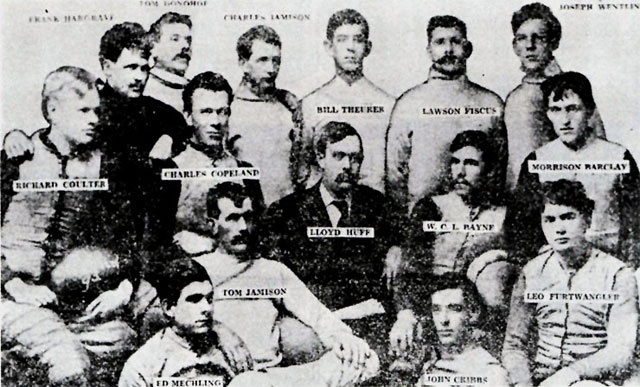
Greensburg Athletic Association: 1893

In 1898, William Chase Temple took over the team payments for the Duquesne Country and Athletic Club, a professional football team based in Pittsburgh from 1895 until 1900, becoming the first known individual football club owner. A year later in 1899, the Morgan Athletic Club, on the South Side of Chicago, was founded. This team later became the Chicago Cardinals, and now is known as the Arizona Cardinals, making them the oldest continuously operating professional football team. The Cardinals would later merge with the Steelers for one season in 1944 due to player shortages as a result of World War II, with the two teams meeting in Super Bowl XLIII over six decades later.

The Duquesne Country and Athletic Club would become the top pro team in the state in 1898 and 1899. In 1898 Latrobe and two players from the Greensburg Athletic Association, formed the very first professional football all-star team for a game against the Duquesne Country and Athletic Club, to be played at Pittsburgh's Exposition Park. Duquesne went on to win the game 16–0. On November 18, 1905, Latrobe defeated the Canton Bulldogs, which later became a founding member, and two-time champion, of the National Football League, 6–0.

Later the Homestead Library & Athletic Club, fielded the top pro team in the state in 1900–1901. In 1902 the top players in the area, mainly from the Duquesne Country and Athletic Club line-up, formed the Pittsburgh Stars of the first National Football League. The Stars were suspected of being financed by Barney Dreyfuss and William Chase Temple, the owners of baseball's Pittsburgh Pirates, who were at the time the dominant team in the National League. The Stars featured baseball players in the line-up including Christy Mathewson, a future Hall of Fame pitcher with the New York Giants and Fred Crolius, and outfielder with Pirates. The team won the league's only championship in 1902.

In 1903, Franklin, Pennsylvania, was the home of the Franklin Athletic Club. That season, the team was unofficially recognized as the "US Football Champions" and later won the 1903 World Series of Football, held that December at Madison Square Garden. The team included several of the era's top players, such as: Herman Kerkhoff, Arthur McFarland, Clark Schrontz, Paul Steinberg, Pop Sweet, Eddie Wood, and coach Blondy Wallace. Other early professional football teams from western Pennsylvania include; the McKeesport Olympics, Oil City Athletic Club, Pitcairn Quakers and Glassport Odds.

In 1933, as the oldest of nine children Art Rooney, who had been raised on the North Side of Pittsburgh, founded the Pittsburgh Steelers. Originally nicknamed the Pirates, the team later changed their name to the Steelers, to represent the city's heritage of producing steel. The Steelers' first season with a winning record came in 1942. However, they lost their first playoff game in 1947.

=== Collegiate (through World War II) ===
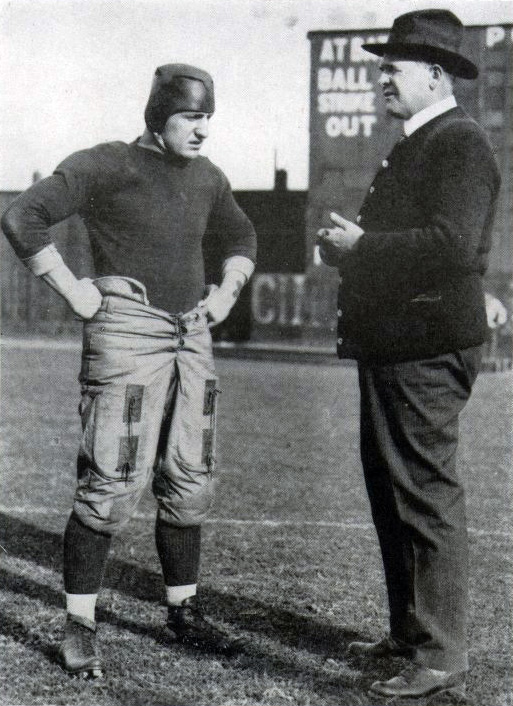
Pitt hall of fame coach "Pop" Warner (right) with 3-time All-American Bob Peck during the 1916 championship season

Western Pennsylvania football at the collegiate level began in the fall of 1889 at the University of Pittsburgh, then known as the Western University of Pennsylvania (WUP). The first official collegiate game in Western Pennsylvania was played on October 11, 1890, when the Allegheny Athletic Association's defeated WUP 38–0. WUP's second game was also the first game for Washington & Jefferson, a rivalry that would dominate the area through the early 20th century.

The region's early thirst for football was made evident when a 12,000 strong overflow crowd packed Exposition Park to watch W&J defeat Duquesne Country and Athletic Club 4–0 in one of the largest crowds in Western Pennsylvania history to that point. By 1904, the region had its first undefeated football team when WUP went 10-0 while surrendering only one touchdown on the way to collectively outscoring opponents 406–5, and by 1908, WUP had adopted its present name, the University of Pittsburgh, and quickly came to be commonly referred to as Pitt. In 1910, led by coach Joseph H. Thompson and star fullback Tex Richards, Pitt went undefeated for the second time in school history, outscoring its nine opponents 282–0, causing some to proclaim it as that season's national champion. This success paved the way for Pitt rise to national prominence under legendary coach Glenn Scobey "Pop" Warner who would lead Pitt to national championships in 1915, 1916, and 1918; along with an additional undefeated season in 1917, while its players garnered 16 first-team All-American selections.

During this era, Washington & Jefferson was also competitive with some of the top teams in the nation. In 1913, the Presidents, led by Bob Folwell, team posted a 10–0–1 record and were the highest scoring team in the nation. That season featured a scoreless tie of Yale, a 100–0 defeat of Grove City College, and a 17–0 victory over Penn State that broke the Nittany Lions' 19-game winning streak, earning the entire school a day off to celebrate. Sportswriter Walter S. Trumbull of The New York Sun suggested that the Michigan Aggies, Washington & Jefferson, Chicago University, and Notre Dame were the new "Big 4 of College Football" instead of the traditional grouping of Princeton, Yale, Harvard, and Penn. The next year, Folwell's team lost at Harvard University in front of 15,000 fans by a score of 10–9. If not for an errant kick that hit the crossbar, W&J would have won the game and at least a share of the mythical national championship. That squad saved face by becoming only the seventh team to ever defeat Yale University, with a decisive 13–7 victory. The game received national press coverage, and the team received a personal note of congratulations by Theodore Roosevelt.

In 1918, perhaps the biggest football game yet played in the region occurred at Forbes Field when undefeated Pitt hosted unscored upon and defending national champion Georgia Tech which was then coached by the legendary John Heisman, who had previously coach for one season at W&J. The game, which served as a War Charities fundraising event, was highly publicized and was played in front of many of the nation's top sports writers, including Walter Camp. Pitt dismantled Georgia Tech 32-0 and would go on to be championed as that season's best team. Another game of import occurred in 1926 when a 6–2 Carnegie Tech football team shutout Knute Rockne's undefeated Notre Dame Fighting Irish 19–0 at Forbes Field. It would be the only loss for the Irish all season and would come to be ranked as the fourth-greatest upset in college football history by ESPN.

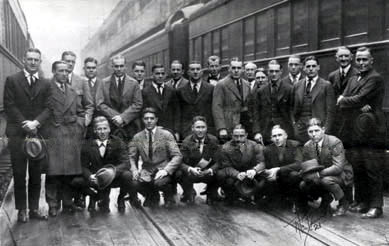
W&J's 11 players boarding the train for the 1922 Rose Bowl.

Washington & Jefferson's 1921 team went 10-0 under coach Greasy Neale, earning them an invitation to the 1922 Rose Bowl to play the heavily favored California Golden Bears. Cal had won their season 312–33, but the W&J defense held the Golden Bears' potent offense, led by Brick Muller, to no points and 2 first downs, no completed passes, and only 49 yards rushing. The game, which would be the last time a "small school" would play in the Rose Bowl, featured the first African-American quarterback to play in the Rose Bowl (W&J's Charlie West) and the first freshman to play in a Rose Bowl (W&J's Herb Kopf).

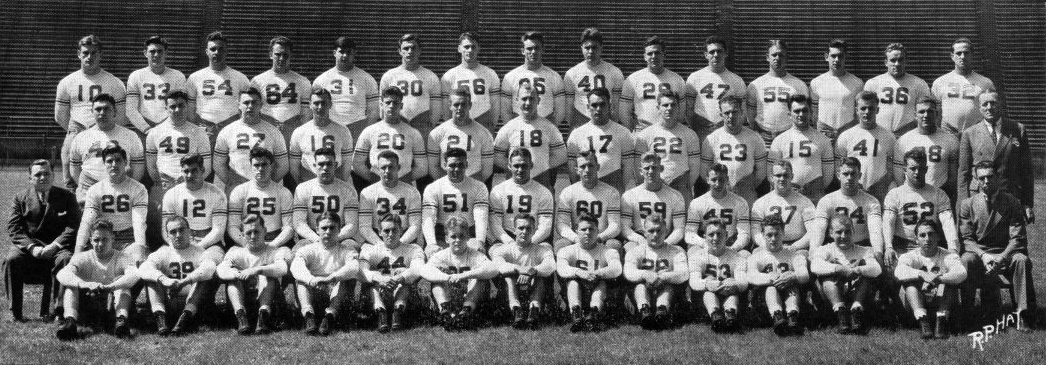
The 1937 undefeated Pitt National Championship team

In 1924, former Pitt All-American Dr. John Bain "Jock" Sutherland took over for Warner as coach of the Pitt Panthers, an event that was soon followed by the opening of university's Pitt Stadium. Sutherland was described as "a national hero" in a Saturday Evening Post article, and was perhaps the most highly admired and influential coach in the history of the university. During his 15-year tenure at the university, the longest of any football coach at Pitt, he compiled a record of 111-20-12 which included 79 shutouts. Sutherland players received 24 first-team All-American selections and his teams were named Eastern football champions seven times: 1925, 1927, 1929, 1931, 1934, 1936, and 1937. During this time, Pitt appeared in four Rose Bowl games (1928, 1930, 1933, and 1937) and turned down a bid for the 1938 Rose Bowl. Sutherland's teams were named "National Champions" by various selectors for nine different seasons including 1925, 1927, 1929, 1931, 1933, 1934, 1936, 1937, and 1938. Of these, the University of Pittsburgh officially recognizes five of those years as national championship seasons: 1929, 1931, 1934, 1936, and 1937.

However, Pitt and Washington & Jefferson weren't the only teams finding their way to major bowls. The 1936 Duquesne Dukes won the 1937 Orange Bowl, 13–12, over Mississippi State, and the 1938 Carnegie Tech Tartans finished sixth in the final Associated Press poll and went to the 1939 Sugar Bowl.

Area colleges were responsible for many innovations in the game. In 1908, Washington & Jefferson became the first team in college history to be documented with uniform numbers. Other sources give that distinction to University of Pittsburgh. The first live radio broadcast of a college football game in the United States when Harold W. Arlin announced the 21-13 Pitt victory in the Backyard Brawl over West Virginia at Forbes Field in Pittsburgh on KDKA on October 8, 1921. Duquesne head coach Elmer Layden is credited with devising the system of hand signals that officials use today. The signal system was put to use for the first time on November 11, 1928, when Duquesne hosted Thiel College at Pitt Stadium. Layden was also the first coach to use two sets of uniform jerseys for home and away contests. In addition, the first nationwide television broadcast of a live sporting event, a Pitt football game against Duke at Pitt Stadium, was televised coast-to-coast by NBC on September 29, 1951.

Despite all their success, area institutions followed the trend of many colleges across the nation and deemphasized football in the wake of World War II. Carnegie Tech and W&J both deemphasized football in various sequences following the war which has resulted in both of their programs today playing in Division III. Also following the war, Duquesne dropped football as a varsity sport until it was resurrected in 1979 before moving to the Division I Football Championship Subdivision in 1993. Although Pitt also instituted policies in the late 1930s designed to de-emphasize its athletic programs, they were subsequently repealed by the mid-1940s. Therefore, Pitt is the only Western Pennsylvania collegiate program that continues to play college football at the highest level, today known as the Division I Football Bowl Subdivision.

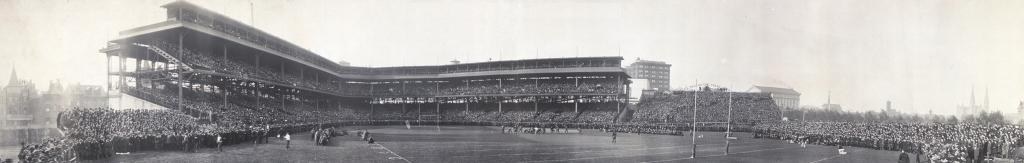
W&J playing Pitt at a packed Forbes Field on November 6, 1915. Pitt, coached by the legendary "Pop" Warner, won the game 19–0. Pitt would finish the season undefeated and lay claim to a national championship.

== Modern history ==
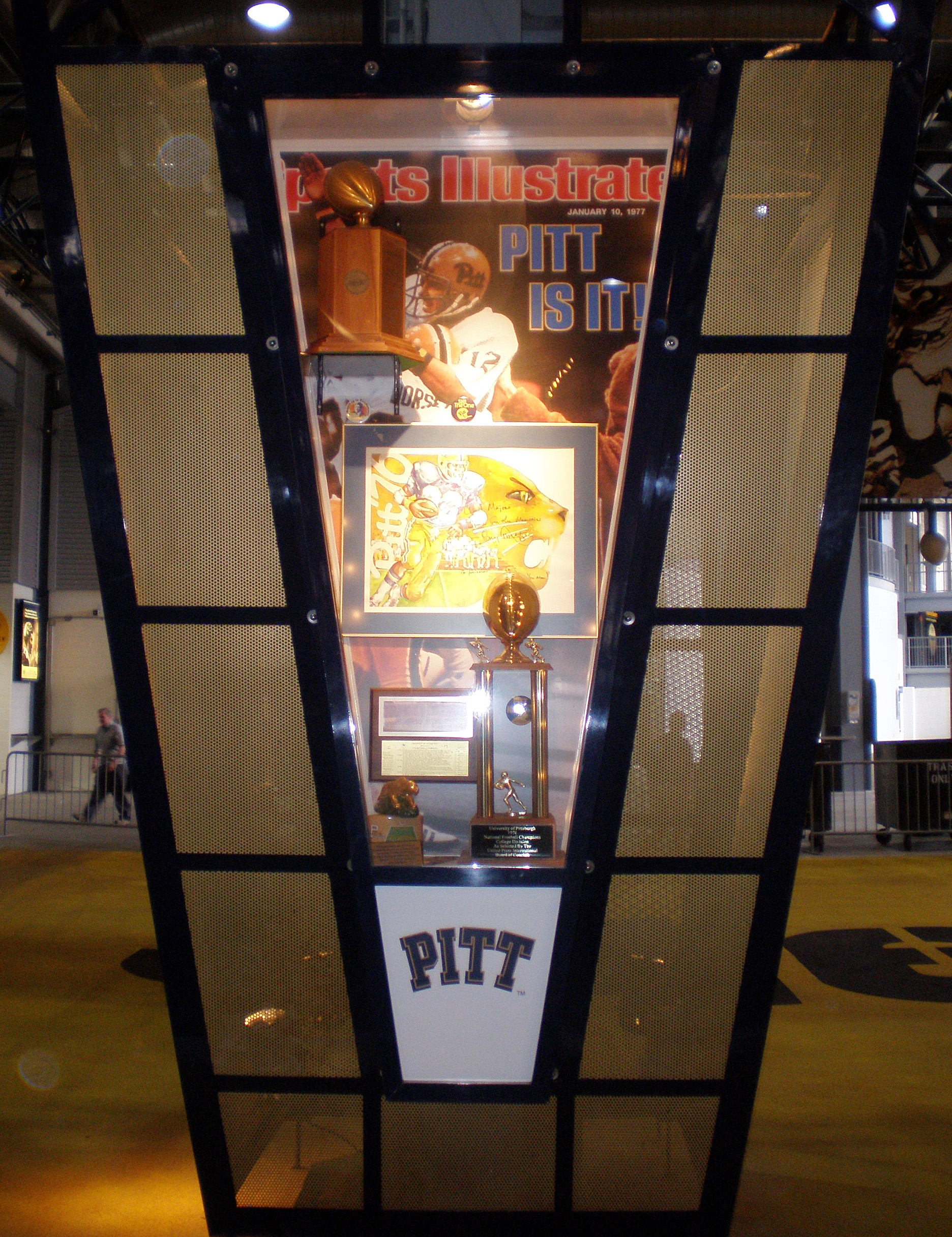
Heinz Field kiosk celebrating Pitt's 1976 National Championship

Following World War II, the Steelers struggled through to the late 1960s. Pitt had a resurgence in the 1950s with stars like Mike Ditka that helped it to attain off-and-on national rankings and make appearances in the Sugar (which Pitt's Bobby Grier desegregated) and Gator bowls. Pitt peaked with a number three national ranking in the final poll of 1963, but then stagnated in the later 1960s. However, both the Panthers and the Steelers—as well as baseball's Pirates—started having successful years in the 1970s as the rest of the city fell into a deep recession as a result of deindustrialization.

In 1969, the Steelers hired head coach Chuck Noll who strategically drafted players in order to improve the team. Three years later, in the first playoff game at Three Rivers Stadium Pittsburgh's rookie running back Franco Harris returned an errant pass that bounced off an opposing player for a game-winning touchdown in a play that later became labeled the Immaculate Reception. In 1974, the Steelers won their first Super Bowl in franchise history—a feat which they would repeat in 1975, 1978, and 1979 to become the first NFL franchise to win four Super Bowls. In 1992, Noll was succeeded by Bill Cowher, who led the franchise to its fifth Super Bowl victory in 2005. Mike Tomlin succeeded Cower and led the Steelers to an NFL record sixth Super Bowl victory in 2008. As of 2009, the Steelers have 18 members in the Pro Football Hall of Fame. In October 1964, Ernie Stautner, who played on the Steelers from 1950 to 1963, became the only Steelers' player to have his number—70—retired.

At Pitt, University Chancellor Wesley Posvar took action to revive the football program and hired Johnny Majors from Iowa State to resurrect the program in 1973. Majors immediately upgraded the recruiting, most notably bringing in future Heisman Trophy winner Tony Dorsett. Majors' impact was immediate: in Pitt's first game with Majors as coach, the Panthers travelled to the University of Georgia where they tied Vince Dooley's Bulldogs 7-7. The excitement in the city was palpable as the Panthers improved from one win in 1972 to a 6-5-1 record in 1973. Their success earned the Panthers their first bowl bid since 1956 when they were invited to play Arizona State in the 1973 Fiesta Bowl, where they lost 28–7. The next season saw further improvement with wins at Florida State and Georgia Tech to finish 7–4. In 1975, a Sun Bowl victory over Kansas capped an 8–4 record highlighted by wins at Georgia and Notre Dame. The stage was thus set for the 1976 edition of the Panthers to make a run for the national championship.

The 1976 season began with the Panthers ranked ninth in the AP preseason poll. The first game was at Notre Dame, where the Irish grew the grass long on the playing field in a failed attempt to slow down Dorsett, who had burned them for 303 rushing yards the year before. Their efforts were in vain as Dorsett ran for a 61-yard touchdown on Pitt's first play from scrimmage on the way to a 31–10 win. The season continued with a 42–14 win at Georgia Tech and a 36–19 win over Miami. On October 23, the Panthers travelled to Annapolis to face Navy during which Dorsett broke the NCAA career rushing record on a 32-yard touchdown run in Pitt's 45–0 victory. Dorsett's achievement prompted a mid-game celebration in which even Navy saluted the feat with a cannon blast. Pitt next defeated eastern rival Syracuse 23–13, and on November 6, number two ranked Pitt easily handled Army while number one ranked Michigan lost to Purdue. For the first time since 1939, the Pitt Panthers were the number one ranked team in the country. The following week, they successfully defended their top rating in a close Backyard Brawl against rival West Virginia. With a record of 10–0, the Panthers headed into their regular season finale with only heated instate rival Penn State standing in the way of Pitt's national title aspirations. At a packed Three Rivers Stadium on the day after Thanksgiving, the Nittany Lions held Dorsett to 51 yards in the first half and had the game tied 7-7. Majors adjusted for the second half by shifting Dorsett from tailback to fullback, enabling him to explode for an additional 173 yards as Pitt rolled to a 24–7 victory that capped an undefeated regular season. In December, Dorsett became the first Pitt Panther to win the Heisman Trophy as the nation's best college football player. Dorsett also won the Maxwell Award, the Walter Camp Player of the Year Award, and was named UPI Player of the Year. The 11-0 Panthers accepted an invitation to the 1977 Sugar Bowl to face second ranked Georgia. Pitt defeated the Bulldogs 27-3 and was voted number one in both the final Associated Press and Coaches polls, claiming their ninth national championship. This was Pitt's first undefeated national championship since 1937. The American Football Coaches Association (AFCA) named Majors the 1976 Coach of the Year. Following this historic season, Majors returned to his alma mater, the University of Tennessee, to take the head coaching job.

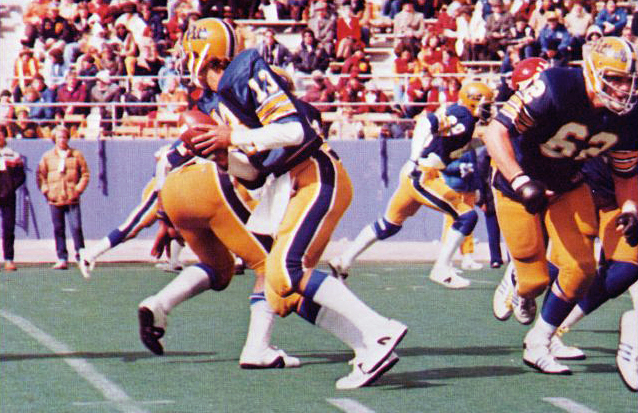
Dan Marino quarterbacks Pitt in a 1979 rout of Cincinnati in what would be the first of three straight 11–1 seasons

Jackie Sherrill, an assistant under Majors at Pitt and the head coach at Washington State, succeeded Majors as head coach at Pitt. Under Sherrill, the winning continued with a 9-2-1 record and Gator Bowl win in 1977. An 8–4 record and Tangerine Bowl appearance followed in 1978. Sherrill stockpiled future NFL talent including Pittsburgh's own quarterback Dan Marino, Hall of Fame inductee Russ Grimm, and Outland Trophy winner Mark May. Sherrill also molded a devastating defense that was anchored at the defensive end position manned by Hall of Fame inductee Rickey Jackson and Heisman Trophy runner-up Hugh Green, who had the highest finish in the Heisman voting by a defensive player until 1997, when Michigan's cornerback Charles Woodson, who also played receiver, won the trophy. 1979 began a string of three straight seasons with 11-1 records. However, an early loss at North Carolina in 1979, a midseason loss during a driving rainstorm at Florida State in 1980, and a devastating season-ending defeat at the hands of rival Penn State in 1981 prevented those teams from clinching an AP or Coaches poll national championship. The 1981 loss to Penn State at Pitt Stadium was especially devastating, as the number one ranked Panthers had opened up a 14-0 first-quarter lead only to see an apparent Dan Marino touchdown pass intercepted in the endzone and returned for a touchdown. The Nittany Lions scored 48 unanswered points to end the Panthers' dream of a second national championship in five years. In each of these three seasons, Pitt rebounded to win a bowl game: the Fiesta, Gator, and Sugar Bowls respectively. The 1982 Sugar Bowl was highlighted by one of the most dramatic plays in Pitt history as Dan Marino hit a streaking John Brown on fourth down in the last seconds of the game for the go-ahead score against a Georgia team that featured Herschel Walker. Sherrill's teams at Pitt are considered by some to be among the most talented in Pitt and college football history. The 1980 Pitt team alone featured seven first round draft picks, 23 players who went on to start in the NFL, seven others who played in the NFL, and one player each who played in the CFL and the USFL. Bobby Bowden, legendary coach of Florida State, is quoted as saying, "I've said it many times, in all my years of coaching, that Pitt team was the best college football team I have ever seen." Sherrill left Pitt in early 1982 for Texas A&M, signing a then record contract worth over $1.7 million. In five seasons, Sherrill's Panthers won fifty games, lost nine, and tied one (50-9-1), which places his 0.842 winning percentage at the top of the list for all Pitt coaches, just ahead of Jock Sutherland.

== Today ==
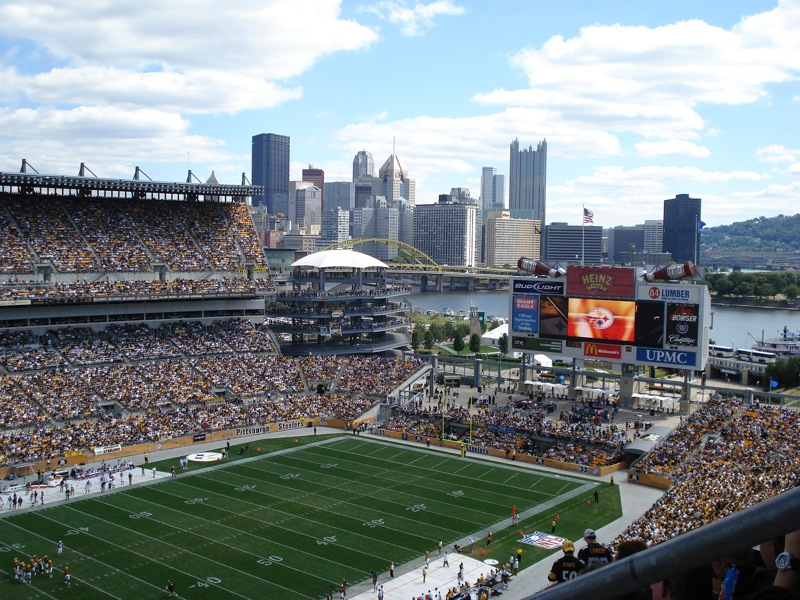
Heinz Field, home of the Steelers and the Pitt Panthers. The WPIAL also holds its annual high school football championships at Heinz Field.

The Steelers are one of the NFL's most popular teams, with a fan base known as Steeler Nation. Despite the difference in high school and college football tastes, the team unites many, and is often one of the NFL's biggest ratings draws.

Since the Dan Marino days at Pitt, the team hasn't competed for a national championship, but has appeared in major bowls and often appears in national polls. The Panthers maintain a rivalry with the West Virginia Mountaineers, and will soon resume a four-game series with another traditional regional rival, the Penn State Nittany Lions. Pitt, Penn State, Notre Dame, and West Virginia all maintain strong local followings within the Pittsburgh region.

Outside of the NFL and college football, the city was represented by the Pittsburgh Americans of the second American Football League in 1936 and 1937. It was also briefly represented by the Pittsburgh Maulers of the United States Football League, in 1984, and the Pittsburgh Gladiators (now the Tampa Bay Storm), of the first Arena Football League from 1987 until 1990. A new Arena Football League team, the Pittsburgh Power, started play in the Consol Energy Center in April 2011.

In addition, Pittsburgh is home to three women's full-contact football teams: the Pittsburgh Passion, the Pittsburgh Force and the Steel City Renegades. Founded in 2002, as members of the National Women's Football Association and having played in the Independent Women's Football League, the Passion are currently members of the Women's Football Alliance. The team went 12–0 and won a national title in 2007 as members of the NWFA. A newer team, the Pittsburgh Force, were founded in 2008 and are members of the WFA. The Renegades, founded in 2009, are members of the Women's Spring Football League.

The "most established area minor-league football team" the Pittsburgh Colts are members of the North American Football League's Regional American Football League.

=== High school football ===
High school football remains popular in the area, with high school games routinely drawing over 10,000 fans per game and receiving regular press coverage in the area. Schools such as McKeesport Area High School, Aliquippa, Allderdice, Beaver Falls, Brashear, Central Catholic, Jeannette, Clairton, Hopewell, Perry, Pine-Richland, North Allegheny, Woodland Hills and Gateway have all been consistent contenders for WPIAL and City League championships and even PIAA championships. Many have sent former star players onto the NFL. Aliquippa alone has sent Mike Ditka, Sean Gilbert, Ty Law, and Darrelle Revis onto successful NFL careers, with Ditka now being a member of the Pro Football Hall of Fame. The PIAA's Western Pennsylvania region, officially known as District 7 but more commonly known by its older name as the WPIAL, has its annual high school football championships at Heinz Field.

== The Cradle of Quarterbacks ==
The Pittsburgh region also has developed many notable athletes that have gone on to outstanding careers in professional sports. The region has produced a multitude of NFL quarterbacks, giving Western Pennsylvania the nickname "Cradle of Quarterbacks." Dan Marino, Joe Montana, Joe Namath, Jim Kelly, Johnny Unitas, Charlie Batch, Marc Bulger, George Blanda, Johnny Lujack, Jeff Hostetler, Matt Schaub, Gus Frerotte, Willie Thrower, Warren Heller, Tyler Palko, Terrelle Pryor, Alex Van Pelt, Sandy Stephens, Terry Hanratty, Mike McMahon, Major Harris, Matt Cavanaugh, Chuck Fusina, Rod Rutherford, Ted Marchibroda, Babe Parilli, John Hufnagel, Tom Sherman, Richie Lucas, Boyd Brumbaugh, Scott Zolak, Anthony Morelli, Ed Matesic, Tom Clements, Coley McDonough, Charley Seabright, Tim Levcik, and former Steelers quarterback Bruce Gradkowski all hail from within a 50-mile radius of the city.
