= List of Pittsburgh Panthers head football coaches =

The Pittsburgh Panthers football program is a college football team that represents the University of Pittsburgh in the Atlantic Coast Conference, a part of the Division I Football Bowl Subdivision. The team has had 36 head coaches since its first recorded football game in 1893.

== Key ==
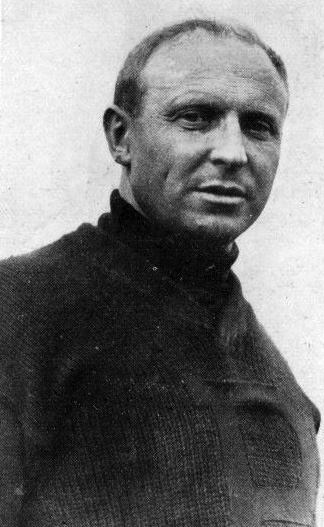
Joseph H. Thompson

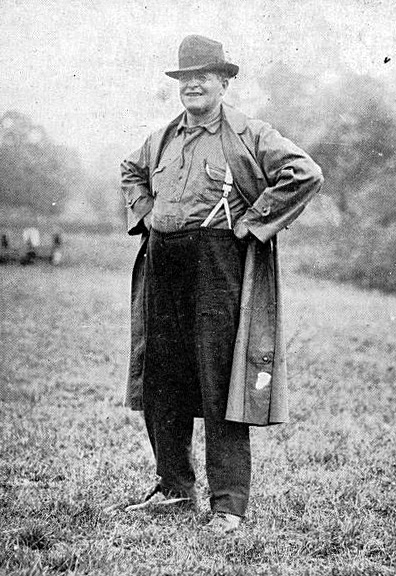
Pop Warner

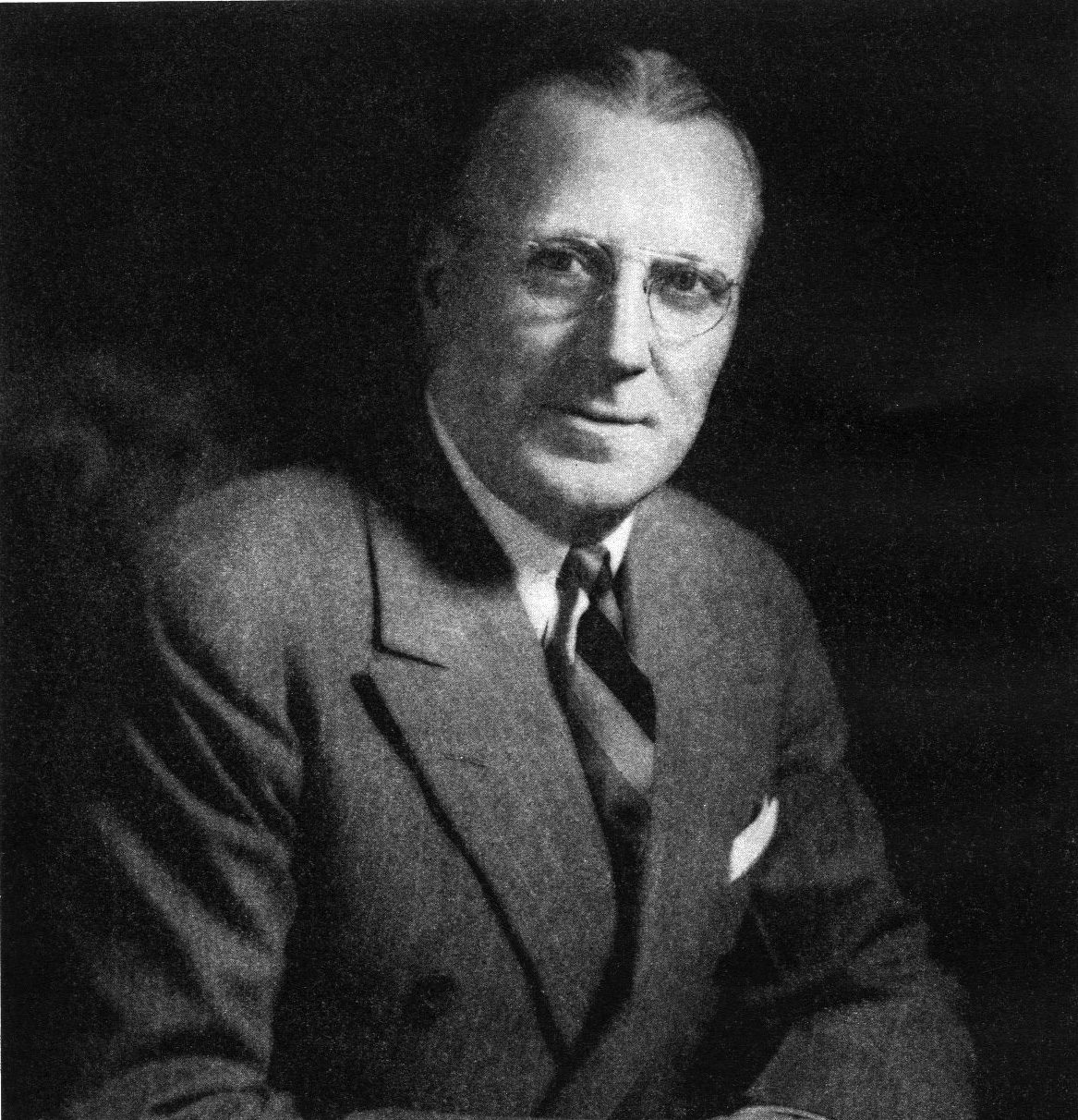
Jock Sutherland

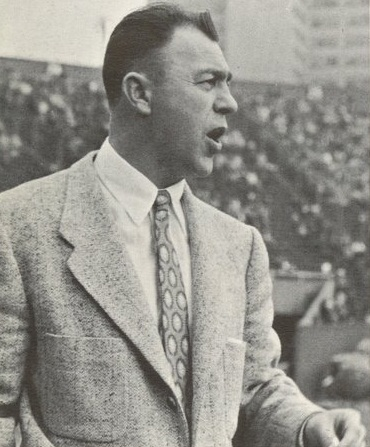
John Michelosen

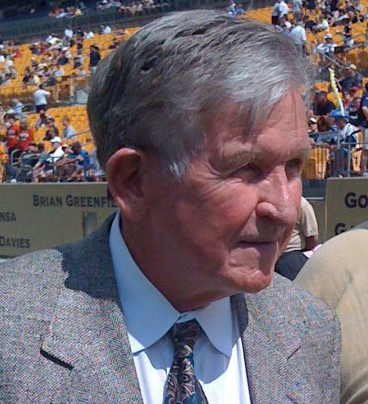
Johnny Majors

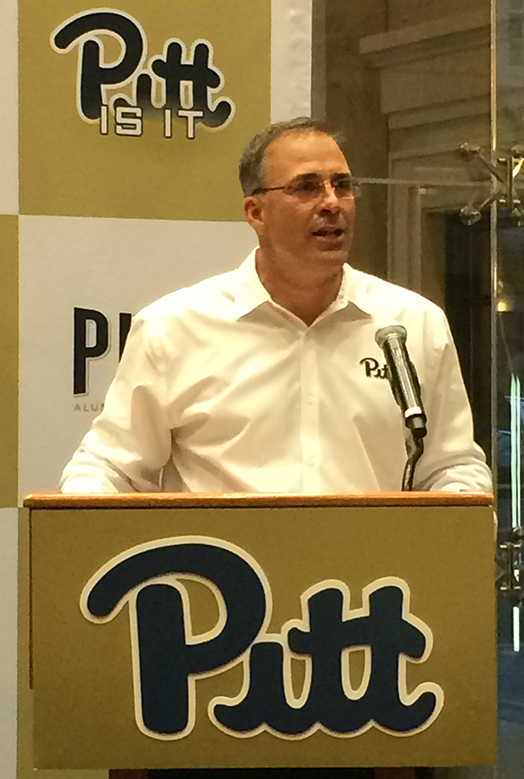
Pat Narduzzi

Key to symbols in coaches list
General		Overall		Conference		Postseason (Note: Although the first Rose Bowl Game was played in 1902, it has been continuously played since the 1916 game, and is recognized as the oldest bowl game by the NCAA. "—" indicates any season prior to 1916 when postseason games were not played.)	
No.	Order of coaches (Note: A running total of the number of head coaches, with coaches who served separate tenures being counted only once. Interim head coaches are represented with "Int" and are not counted in the running total. "—" indicates the team played but either without a coach or no coach is on record. "X" indicates an interim year without play.)	GC	Games coached	CW	Conference wins	PW	Postseason wins
DC	Division championships	OW	Overall wins	CL	Conference losses	PL	Postseason losses
CC	Conference championships	OL	Overall losses	CT	Conference ties	PT	Postseason ties
NC	National championships	OT	Overall ties (Note: Overtime rules in college football were introduced in 1996, making ties impossible in the period since.)	C%	Conference winning percentage		
†	Elected to the College Football Hall of Fame	O%	Overall winning percentage (Note: When computing the win–loss percentage, a tie counts as half a win and half a loss.)				

== Head coaches ==
Statistics correct as of September 23, 2026.

No.	Name	Term	GC	OW	OL	OT	O%	CW	CL	CT	C%	PW	PL	CCs	NCs	DCs	Awards
0	No coach	1890–1892, 1894	18	8	10	0	.444	—	—	—		—	—	—	0	—	
1	Anson Harrold	1893	5	0	5	0	.000	—	—	—		—	—	—	0	—	
2	J. P. Linn	1895	7	1	6	0	.143	—	—	—		—	—	—	0	—	
3	George W. Hoskins	1896	9	3	6	0	.333	—	—	—		—	—	—	0	—	
4	Thomas Trenchard	1897	4	1	3	0	.250	—	—	—		—	—	—	0	—	
5	Fred A. Robison	1898–1899	13	8	4	1	.654	—	—	—		—	—	—	0	—	
6	Roy Jackson	1900	9	5	4	0	.556	—	—	—		—	—	—	0	—	
7	Wilbur Hockensmith	1901	10	7	2	1	.750	—	—	—		—	—	—	0	—	
8	Fred Crolius	1902	12	5	6	1	.458	—	—	—		—	—	—	0	—	
9	Arthur Mosse	1903–1905	32	20	11	1	.641	—	—	—		—	—	—	0	—	
10	Edgar Wingard	1906	10	6	4	0	.600	—	—	—		—	—	—	0	—	
11	John A. Moorhead	1907	10	8	2	0	.800	—	—	—		—	—	—	0	—	
12	Joseph H. Thompson^{†}	1908–1912	46	30	14	2	.674	—	—	—		—	—	—	0	—	
13	Joseph M. Duff, Jr.	1913–1914	18	14	3	1	.806	—	—	—		—	—	—	0	—	
14	Pop Warner^{†}	1915–1923	76	60	12	4	.816	—	—	—		0	0	—	3	—	
15	Jock Sutherland^{†}	1924–1938	143	111	20	12	.818	—	—	—		1	3	—	5	—	
16	Charley Bowser	1939–1942	35	14	20	1	.414	—	—	—		0	0	—	0	—	
17	Clark Shaughnessy^{†}	1943–1945	27	10	17	0	.370	—	—	—		0	0	—	0	—	
18	Wes Fesler^{†}	1946	9	3	5	1	.389	—	—	—		0	0	—	0	—	
19	Mike Milligan	1947–1949	27	13	14	0	.481	—	—	—		0	0	—	0	—	
20	Len Casanova^{†}	1950	9	1	8	0	.111	—	—	—		0	0	—	0	—	
21	Tom Hamilton^{†}	1951, 1954	16	7	9	0	.438	—	—	—		0	0	—	0	—	
22	Red Dawson	1952–1954	21	9	11	1	.452	—	—	—		0	0	—	0	—	
23	John Michelosen	1955–1965	112	56	49	7	.531	—	—	—		0	2	—	0	—	
24	Dave Hart	1966–1968	30	3	27	0	.100	—	—	—		0	0	—	0	—	
25	Carl DePasqua	1969–1972	42	13	29	0	.310	—	—	—		0	0	—	0	—	
26, 31	Johnny Majors^{†}	1973–1976, 1993–1996	91	45	45	1	.500	7	21	0	.250	2	1	0	1	—	
27	Jackie Sherrill	1977–1981	60	50	9	1	.842	—	—	—		4	1	—	0	—	
28	Foge Fazio	1982–1985	46	25	18	3	.576	—	—	—		0	2	—	0	—	
29	Mike Gottfried	1986–1989	45	27	16	2	.622	—	—	—		0	1	—	0	—	
30	Paul Hackett	1989–1992	34	13	20	1	.397	4	5	0	.444	1	0	0	0	—	
Int	Sal Sunseri	1992	1	0	1	0	.000	0	0	0	–	0	0	0	0	—	
32	Walt Harris	1997–2004	96	52	44	—	.542	28	27	—	.509	3	2	1	0	—	
33	Dave Wannstedt	2005–2010	73	42	31	—	.575	24	18	—	.571	1	1	1	0	—	
Int	Michael Haywood	2010	0	0	0	—	—	—	—	—	—	0	0	0	0	—	
Int	Phil Bennett	2010	1	1	0	—	1.000	0	0	—	—	1	0	0	0	—	
34	Todd Graham	2011	12	6	6	—	.500	4	3	—	.571	0	0	0	0	—	
Int	Keith Patterson	2011	1	0	1	—	.000	0	0	—	—	0	1	0	0	—	
35	Paul Chryst	2012–2014	38	19	19	—	.500	10	13	—	.400	1	1	0	0	0	
Int	Joe Rudolph	2014	1	0	1	—	.000	0	0	—	—	0	1	0	0	0	
36	Pat Narduzzi	2015–present	144	85	63	—	.576	53	39	—	.576	2	6	1	0	2	
