= 1893 Greensburg Athletic Association season =

American football team season

1893 Greensburg Athletic Association football
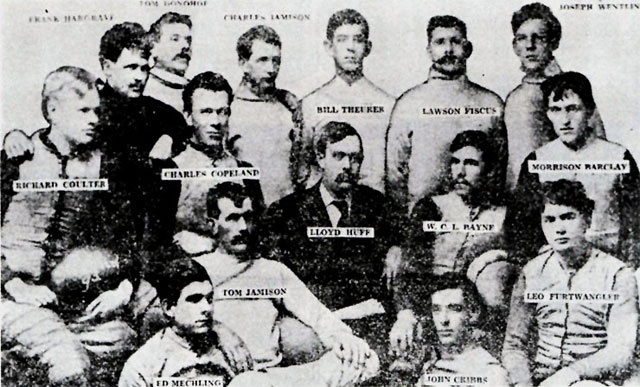
- Record: Unknown
- Manager: Lloyd B. Huff
- Captain: Richard Coulter Jr.
- Home field: Athletic Park

The 1893 Greensburg Athletic Association season was their fourth season in existence. The team's record for this season is largely unknown. Lloyd B. Huff was the team manager and Richard Coulter Jr. was captain.

== Schedule ==
Date	Opponent	Result
September 30	Altoona Athletic Club	Unknown
October 7	at Kiskiminetas	W 6–0
October 14	at Pittsburgh Athletic Club	L 0–10
October 21	Western University of Pennsylvania	Canceled
October 28	at Altoona Athletic Club	L 0–24
January 1	Picked college team	T 0–0

== Notes and references ==
- Van Atta, Robert (1983). "The History of Pro Football At Greensburg, Pennsylvania (1894–1900)" (PDF). Coffin Corner (Annual). Professional Football Researchers Association: 1–14. Archived from the original (PDF) on November 27, 2010.
