= Adam Wyant =

American politician (1869–1935)

Adam Martin Wyant
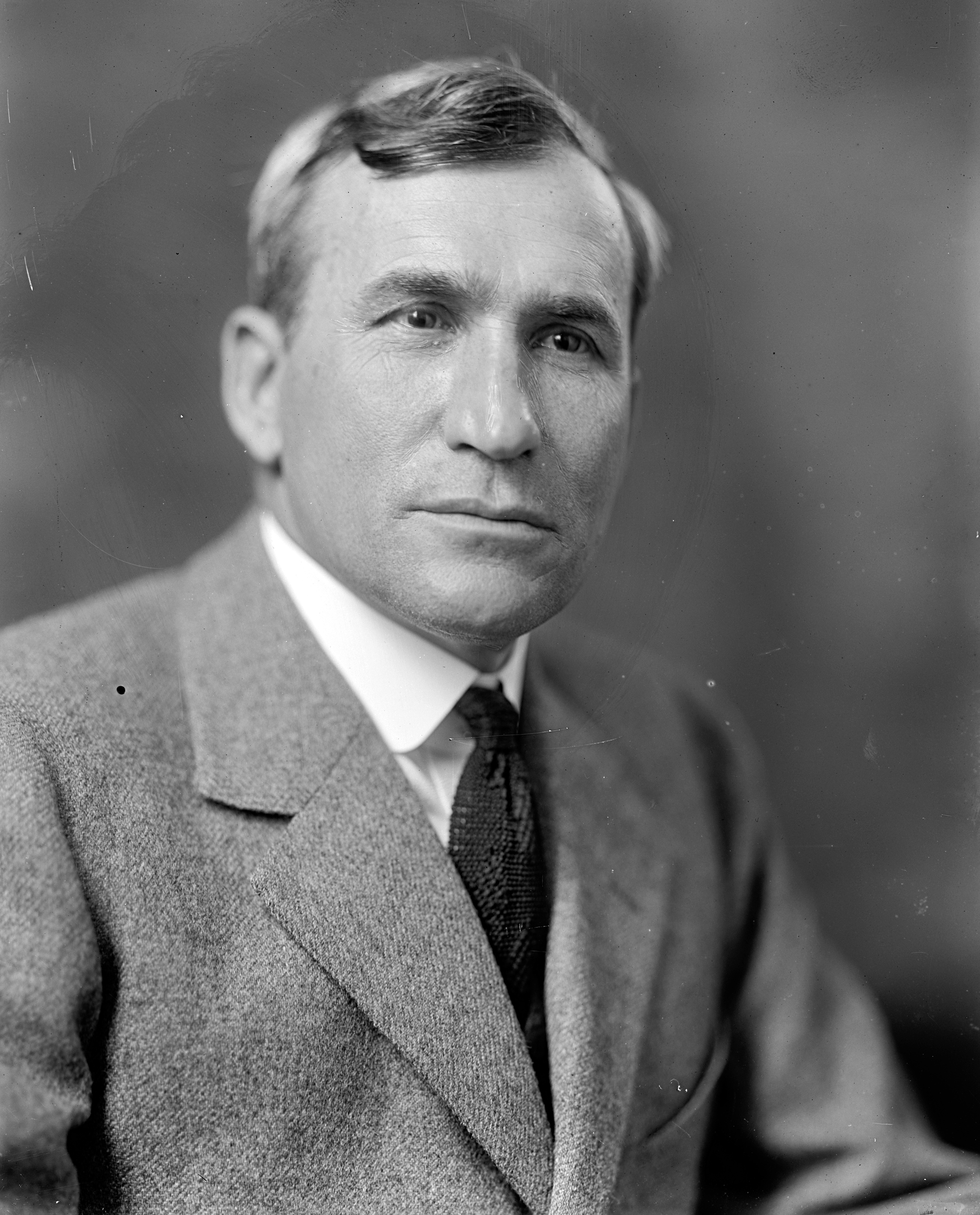

Member of the U.S. House of Representatives from Pennsylvania
- In office March 4, 1921 – March 3, 1933
- Preceded by: John H. Wilson (22nd); John M. Morin (31st)
- Succeeded by: Samuel F. Glatfelter (22nd); M. Clyde Kelly (31st)
- Constituency: 22nd district (1921-23); 31st district (1923-33)

Personal details
- Born: September 15, 1869 Montgomeryville, Pennsylvania, U.S.
- Died: January 5, 1935 (aged 65) Greensburg, Pennsylvania, U.S.
- Party: Republican
- Spouse: Katherine N. Doty
- Education: Bucknell University, University of Chicago, University of Pittsburgh
- Profession: Professional football player, Educator, Lawyer, Politician,

Adam Wyant
Profile
- Positions: Quarterback, Center

Career information
- College: Bucknell, Chicago

Career history
- Greensburg Athletic Association (1895–1897)

Awards and highlights
- First professional football player elected to the U.S. Congress; W. Pennsylvania Champion (1897)

Adam Martin Wyant (September 15, 1869 – January 5, 1935) was an American politician who served as Republican member of the U.S. House of Representatives from Pennsylvania. He served six terms, a total of twelve years, in the House.

Wyant is also remembered for being the first professional football player to be elected to the United States Congress. He played football from 1895 until 1897 with the Greensburg Athletic Association, an early professional club from Greensburg, Pennsylvania.

He is also known for playing collegiate football for Bucknell University and the University of Chicago from 1890 through 1893. During his playing career, Wyant was cited by his coach at Chicago, Amos Alonzo Stagg, as “one of the best men that ever donned the canvas jacket” (which was then a part of the football uniform). Wyant also served at one time as principal of the Greensburg schools before becoming a U.S. Congressman. His brother, Andy, played at Bucknell and Chicago, under Amos Alonzo Stagg. He was elected into the College Football Hall of Fame in 1962.

== Biography ==
Adam Wyant was born near Kittanning on his family's rural farm in the village of Montgomeryville, son of Christian Yerty Wyant and Elizabeth John, both of Washington Township, Armstrong County, Pennsylvania. Adam was named after his paternal grandfather whose ancestors (originally spelled Weyandt) were early German settlers of Bedford County, Pennsylvania arriving in October 1770 from Freinsheim, Palatinate, Germany.

Adam attended the Mount Pleasant Institute, which is located in Lewisburg, Pennsylvania, and also attended Bucknell for three years, playing on pioneer football teams there with his brother Andy. When Andy left Bucknell to attend the University of Chicago Divinity School, Adam followed his brother to Chicago and played guard for the legendary coach, Amos Alonzo Stagg. In 1895, Adam graduated from the University of Chicago and returned to western Pennsylvania to teach in Mt. Pleasant. He moved to Greensburg, Pennsylvania, in 1896.

In Greensburg, Wyant was widely known for his football skills and, at 6'0" and 196 pounds, he was considered a big person for that era. In the fall of 1895, was one of four college stars signed to play professionally with the Greensburg Athletic Association. His teammeates consisted of Lawson Fiscus and Charlie Atherton. Wyant played quarterback for the team, a position that was not too different from guard in the style of play at the time. In 1896, while still playing pro football, he became the first principal of Greensburg High School and soon thereafter became the city's first superintendent of schools.

In the summer of 1897, he ended his football career and studied law at the University of Pittsburgh, and was admitted to the Westmoreland County, Pennsylvania Bar in 1902. He then commenced the practice of law in Greensburg. He was interested in coal mining and other business enterprises.

In 1910, Wyant married Katherine N. Doty, the daughter of a Westmoreland County judge. In 1920, he was elected as a Republican to the 67th United States Congress. He won the state's 22nd congressional district with the largest majority ever given a Republican candidate in the district's history. He was then re-elected five more times. He was an unsuccessful candidate for reelection in 1932.

== Death ==
He resumed his former business pursuits and died in Greensburg, after succumbing to cancer on January 5, 1935. He was interred in the St. Clair Cemetery.

== Electoral history ==
Year	District	Republican	Pct	Democrat	Pct
1920	PA-22	**Adam Martin Wyant**	51.6%	John Haden Wilson	38.1%
1922	PA-31	**Adam Martin Wyant**	53.4%	James M. Cramer	40.1%
1924	PA-31	**Adam Martin Wyant**	60.4%	Chester D. Sensenich	39.6%
1926	PA-31	**Adam Martin Wyant**	65.7%	Albert H. Bell	32.1%
1928	PA-31	**Adam Martin Wyant**	95.8%	None	0.0%
1930	PA-31	**Adam Martin Wyant**	70.5%	James M. Cramer	27.2%
1932	PA-28	Adam Martin Wyant	40.8%	**William M. Berlin**	55.2%

Minor party candidates not shown
Election winner in bold

U.S. House of Representatives
Preceded by John H. Wilson	Member of the U.S. House of Representatives from Pennsylvania's 22nd congressional district 1921–1923	Succeeded by Samuel F. Glatfelter
Preceded by John M. Morin	Member of the U.S. House of Representatives from Pennsylvania's 31st congressional district 1923–1933	Succeeded by M. Clyde Kelly
