= Offutt Field (Greensburg) =

Athletic field in Pennsylvania, US

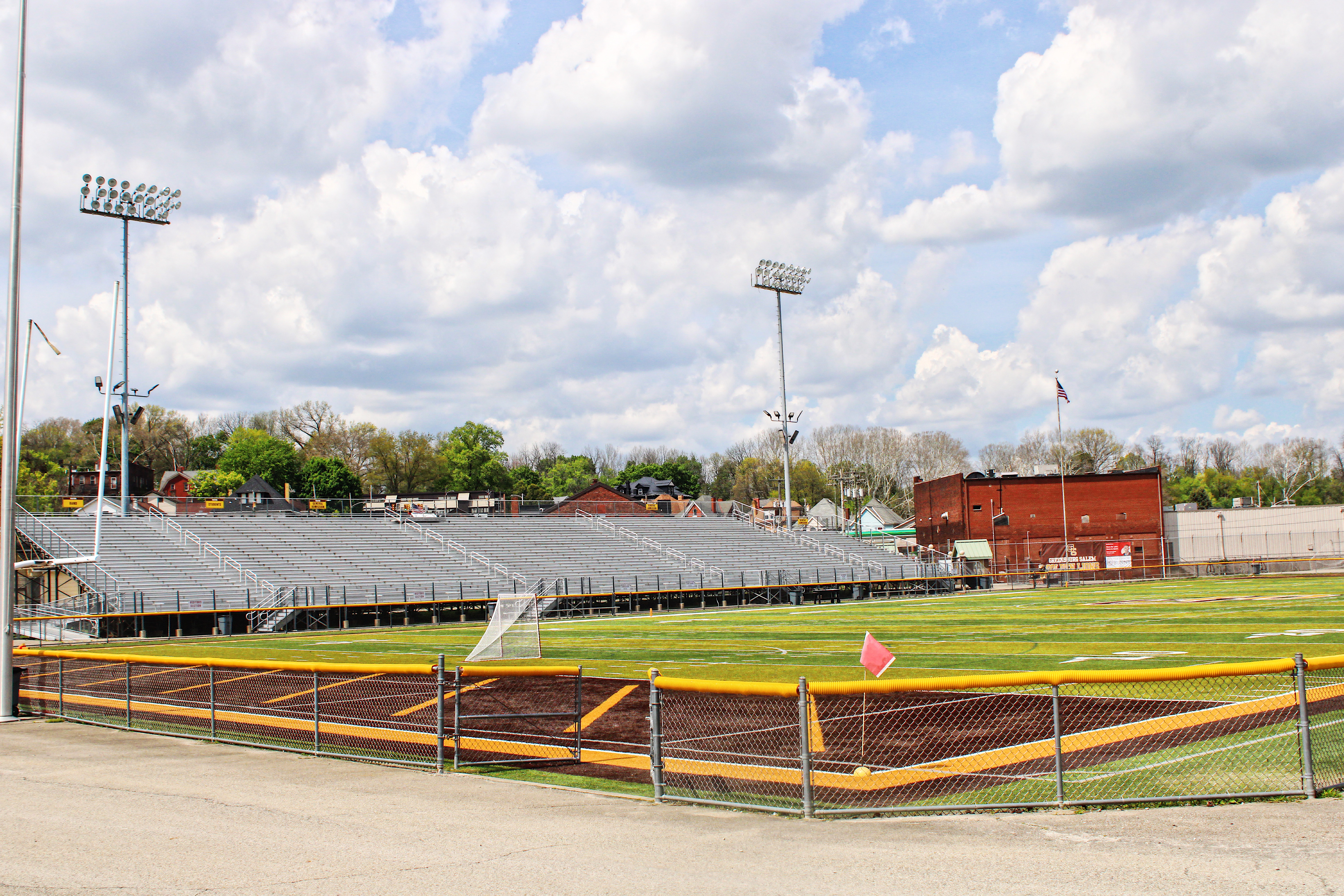

- Location within Pennsylvania
- Former names: Athletic Park (1890–1928)
- Location: 302 South Urania Avenue Greensburg, Pennsylvania
- Coordinates: 40°18′11″N 079°32′24″W
- Owner: Greensburg-Salem School District
- Surface: Artificial turf

Construction
- Opened: 1890

Tenants
- Seton Hill Griffins (NCAA) (2005-Present); Greensburg-Salem High School (WPIAL) (1894-Present); Past Tenants; Greensburg Athletic Association (WPPFC) (1890–1900); Greensburg Red Sox (WPL) (1907); Greensburg Trojans (PSA) (1934); Greensburg Red Wings (PSA) (1935–1936); Greensburg Green Sox (PSA) (1937–1938); Greensburg Senators (PSA) (1939); Greensburg Central Catholic H.S. (WPIAL) (1960–1993)

Offutt Field is a multi-purpose athletic field, located in Greensburg, Pennsylvania. It is currently used by the Greensburg-Salem School District and Seton Hill University, primarily as a football field. The stadium was called Athletic Park, until 1928 when Greensburg-Salem renamed the field after James H. Offutt, a community leader, and school director. The school district had previously purchased the land in December 1916. The purchase price for the 4.4-acre site was $17,166.66. The Greensburg Athletic Association, an early organized football team based in Greensburg, played their home games at the stadium from 1890 to 1900. The stadium has also hosted minor league baseball, Little League baseball and track and field.

Offutt Field is currently the stadium with longest service in southwestern Pennsylvania.

== History ==
=== Pro football ===
The field was the home of the Greensburg Athletic Association, a professional football team during the 1890s. The field's playing surface once had a stream, known as Jack's Run, which crossed a corner of the field. Early-day accounts of football games at Athletic Park noted that the football occasionally went into the creek, and players became heroes with the crowd for plunging into the waters to retrieve the ball. On October 26, 1895, during a game between Greensburg and the Carnegie Athletic Club of Braddock, once Greensburg scored a touchdown after only a minute and a half into the game, some spectators at Athletic Park were, according to news reports at the time, were "so hilarious over the rout that they threw their hats in the air and some went in the creek" that ran past a corner of the field. In 1916, the field level was raised and the creek covered. Jacob's Run is a part of Jacob's Creek.

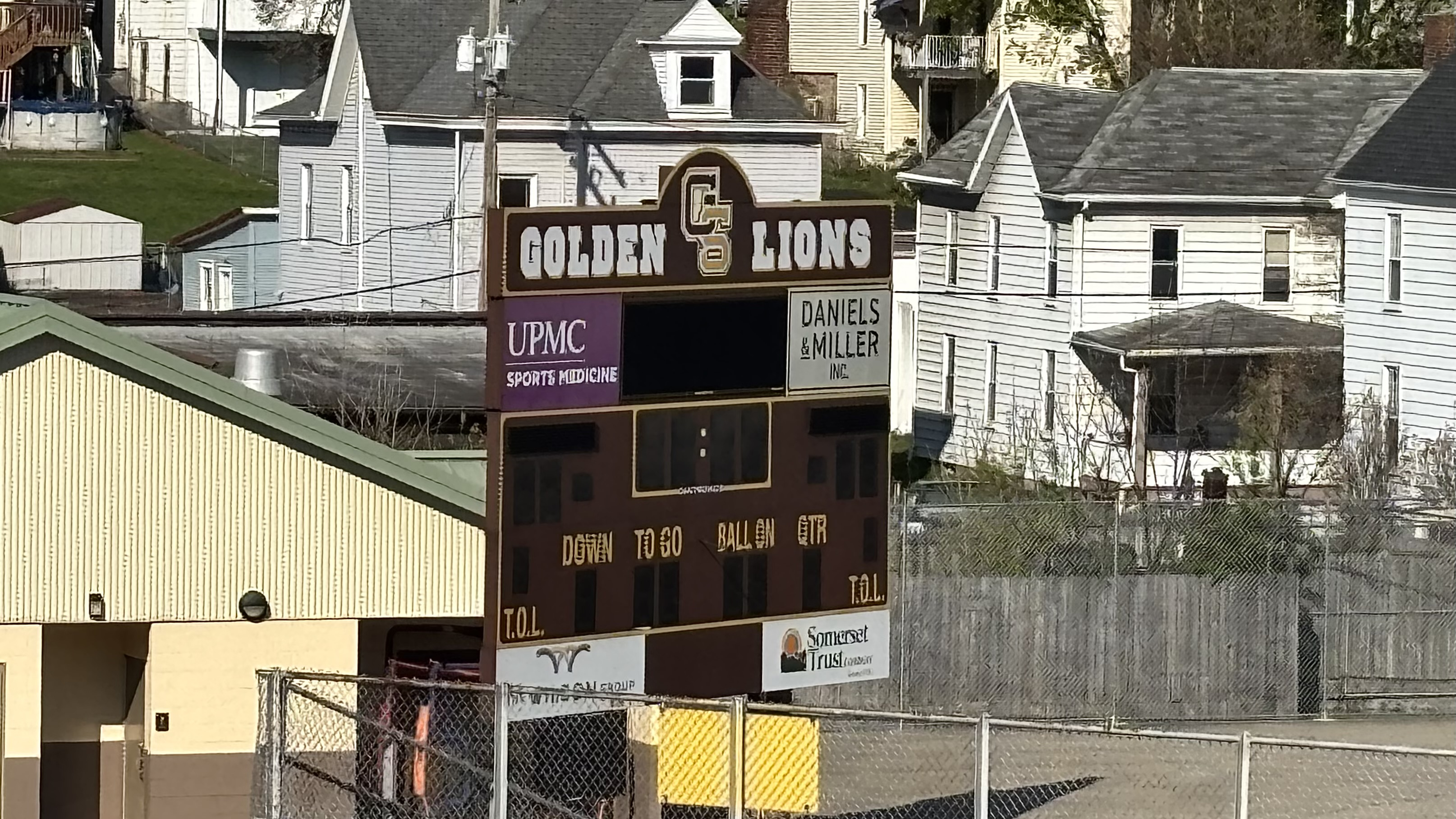
Offutt Field scoreboard

The field saw a memorable game that ended in a scoreless draw on November 24, 1894, between Greensburg and the Jeannette Athletic Club. During the first half of the game, Greensburg's Lawson Fiscus got into a violent altercation (which was very common in this era) with an unknown Jeannette player. Several accounts of the incident describe Fiscus kicking the Jeannette player in the face. However, the Pittsburgh Press reported that Fiscus had tripped the player and "purposely tramped on his neck." Either way, Jeannette immediately petitioned the referee to expel Fiscus from the game; meanwhile, Greensburg defended Fiscus' actions. The arguments continued through to the second half of the game. Finally, either Jeannette or Greensburg stormed off the field in protest, and the game was declared a scoreless draw. Another memorable professional game occurred at the field on Saturday, October 12, 1895, the Greensburg Athletic Association defeated the Western University of Pennsylvania (renamed the University of Pittsburgh in 1909), 42–2. In this era of football, it was common for college and professional teams to play each other. During this game, it was discovered that Western University's coach gave his players a set of signals, commonly used in pre-huddle football days, used by Penn State the year before. Two of the key players of the Greensburg team had starred for Penn State the year before, one of which was player-coach Charlie Atherton. Thus, the team knew what the play was prior to the snap.

The field is still used today by professional football teams. Currently the Pittsburgh Steelers, of the National Football League use the field for pre-season scrimmages. The Steelers used Offutt Field until the field changed to artificial grass.

=== Baseball ===
In the summer of 1936, Major League Baseball's St. Louis Cardinals, behind Pepper Martin, defeated their Class D Pennsylvania State Association farm team, the Greensburg Red Wings, 11–0, in front of 1,500 spectators at Offutt Field. In 1937, Greensburg Green Sox minor league baseball team was instrumental in getting funds for lights at Offutt Field in the city, setting the stage for night high school football, which debuted that fall. The field hosted minor league teams that were affiliated with the Cardinals, Washington Senators, and Brooklyn Dodgers

=== College ===
In 2005, Greensburg-Salem School District and Seton Hill College agreed to a 10-year lease in which the college will pay $35,000 to the school district each year for the right to play its home games at Offutt Field. Seton Hill has guaranteed the total amount of the lease, meaning it will be paid to the district even if the college finds another home field during its run.

=== High school ===
The field has been used by Greensburg High School and Salem High School since 1894. The two districts merged in 1960 to form Greensburg-Salem School District. From 1960 until 1993, Greensburg Central Catholic High School played their home games at the stadium.
