= 1891 Allegheny Athletic Association football season =

American football team season

1891 Allegheny Athletic Association football
- Record: 2–2–1
- Manager: O. D. Thompson
- Captain: O. D. Thompson
- Home field: Exposition Park

The Allegheny Athletic Association played its second season of American football in 1891. Led by manager and captain O. D. Thompson, the team compiled a record of 2–2–1.

== Schedule ==
Date	Opponent	Site	Result	Source
October 24	Greensburg Athletic Association	Exposition Park; Allegheny, PA	W 10–0	
October 31	at Cleveland Athletic Club	Cleveland AC field; Cleveland, OH	L 4–22	
November 7	Dayton Athletic Club	Exposition Park; Allegheny, PA	L 6–10	
November 14	Washington & Jefferson	Exposition Park; Allegheny, PA	W 8–4	
November 21	Cleveland Athletic Club	Exposition Park; Allegheny, PA	T 6–6	
