= George Barclay (American football/baseball) =

American football and baseball player (1876–1909)

Profile
- Position: Halfback

Personal information
- Born: May 16, 1876; Milton, Pennsylvania, U.S.
- Died: April 3, 1909 (aged 32); Hospital of the University of Pennsylvania, Philadelphia, Pennsylvania, U.S.

Career information
- College: Bucknell, Lafayette

Career history

Playing
- Greensburg Athletic Association (1897–1898); Western Pa. All-Stars (1898)

Coaching
- Greensburg Athletic Association (1897–1899) Head coach; Muhlenberg (1907) Head coach; Lafayette (1908) Head coach

Awards and highlights
- Invented the first-ever football helmet (1894); "All Western Pennsylvania" Team (1897); Lafayette Maroon Club Hall of Fame (1984)

George Barclay
- Outfielder
- Batted: Right Threw: Right

MLB debut
- April 17, 1902, for the St. Louis Cardinals

Last MLB appearance
- May 30, 1905, for the Boston Beaneaters

MLB statistics
- Batting average: .248
- Home runs: 4
- Runs batted in: 140
- Stats at Baseball Reference

Teams
- St. Louis Cardinals (1902–1904); Boston Beaneaters (1904–1905)

George Oliver Barclay (May 16, 1876 – April 3, 1909) was an American football and baseball player. He played Major League Baseball for the St. Louis Cardinals and later the Boston Beaneaters. He was also an early professional football player-coach for the Greensburg Athletic Association. He was nicknamed "The Rose" for his concern with his looks and "Deerfoot" because of his speed. Barclay also invented the first football helmet.

== Baseball career ==
=== Minor leagues ===
Barclay began his professional baseball career in 1896 with the Chambersburg Maroons in the independent Cumberland Valley League. He continued to play both football and minor league baseball. In 1901, he batted .335 for the Rochester Bronchos of the Eastern League, earning him a look from the Cardinals.

=== St. Louis Cardinals ===
Barclay was 25 years old when he broke into the big leagues on April 17, 1902, with the St. Louis Cardinals. Two of the team's starting outfielders, Jesse Burkett and Emmet Heidrick, had jumped to the rival St. Louis Browns of the new American League, and Barclay, along with Doc Smoot, were acquired to replace them, with Barclay becoming the everyday left fielder. Both men hit over .300 that year, as did their manager and outfield mate Patsy Donovan, but the Cardinals still fell from fourth to sixth.

In 1903, although Smoot continued to play well, Barclay's production fell off, batting just .248. Still, he was brought back to be the team's starting left fielder in 1904. His performance continued to decline, and he was batting just .200 when he was sold to the Boston Beaneaters on September 11, 1904, having been replaced by rookie Hugh Hill.

=== Beaneaters and return to the minors ===
Barclay was moved to right field by the Beaneaters, and his average bounced back a bit to .226 during his time with Boston. He started the 1905 season back in left field, but after batting just .176 in 29 games he was replaced by Jim Delahanty and eventually released on May 22, 1905.

Barclay returned to Rochester to finish the 1905 season, but he never regained his previous level of performance, as he batted .245 that year, then just .190 in 1906. After one more season with the class-B Lynn Shoemakers of the New England League, batting .207 in 43 games, Barclay left professional baseball.

== First football helmet and career ==
Barclay was credited with inventing the first-ever football helmet in 1894, with the intention that it would prevent cauliflower ears. The helmet was constructed by a saddle-maker from nearby Easton with strips of leather harness padding. It attracted national attention in a Lafayette game against Penn on Oct. 24, 1896. The NCAA and the National Football League made helmets mandatory in 1939 and in 1941, respectively.

Barclay was a member of the 1896 Lafayette football team that won the national championship. The next year, he was a player-coach for the Greensburg Athletic Association. At that season's end, The Pittsburg Times named him captain of its "All- Western Pennsylvania" team; he was the only Greensburg player named to that honorary squad. A year later, he was chosen by Dave Berry, the manager of the rival Latrobe Athletic Association, to play for the Western Pennsylvania All-Stars in the very first football all-star game, against the Duquesne Country and Athletic Club.

== Death ==
Barclay died on April 3, 1909, at the Hospital of the University of Pennsylvania in Philadelphia. He succumbed to peritonitis after an operation for appendicitis. In 1984-85, Barclay was inducted into the Lafayette College Maroon Club Hall of Fame.

== Head coaching record ==
=== College ===
| Year | Team | Overall | Conference | Standing | Bowl/playoffs |
|---|---|---|---|---|---|
Rochester Yellowjackets (Independent) (1899)
| 1899 | Rochester | 6–1–2 | | | |
Rochester Yellowjackets (Independent) (1901)
| 1901 | Rochester | 7–4 | | | |
| Rochester: | | 13–5–2 | | | |
Muhlenberg Cardinal and Grey (Independent) (1907)
| 1907 | Muhlenberg | 7–3 | | | |
| Muhlenberg: | | 7–3 | | | |
Lafayette (Independent) (1908)
| 1908 | Lafayette | 6–2–2 | | | |
| Lafayette: | | 6–2–2 | | | |
| Total: | | 26–10–4 | | | |
