= 1899 Duquesne Country and Athletic Club season =

American football team season

1899 Duquesne Country and Athletic Club football
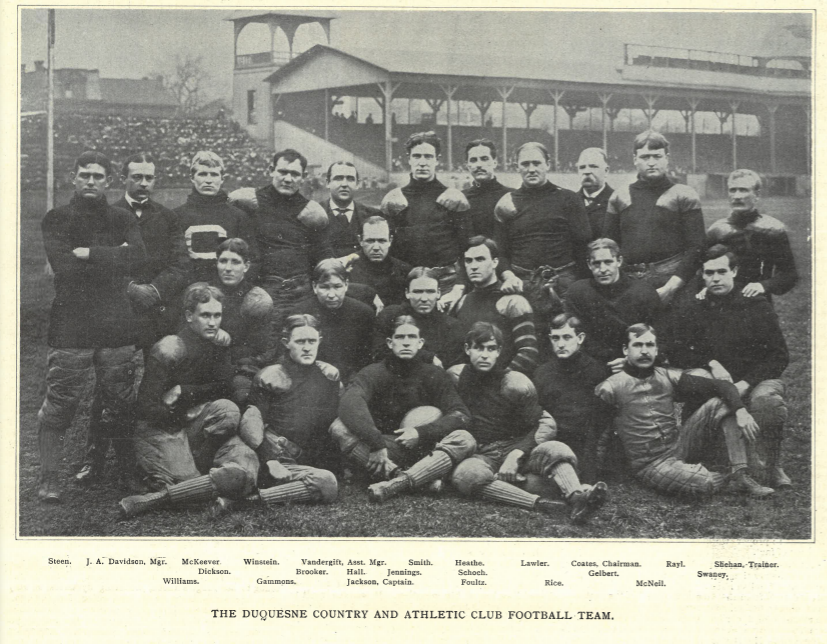
- Record: 10–0
- Chairman: William Coates
- Manager: John A. Davidson
- Head coach: Roy Jackson (2nd year)
- Captain: Roy Jackson (2nd year)
- Home field: Exposition Park

The Duquesne Country and Athletic Club played its fifth season of American football in 1899. The team allowed only one touchdown all season (to Penn State) and outscored opponents by a total of 372 to 15 while compiling a 10–0 record. Roy Jackson was in his second year as the team's captain and coach.

== Schedule ==
Date	Opponent	Site	Result	Attendance	Source
October 6	Tenth Regiment	Exposition Park; Allegheny City, PA	W 21–0	1,500	
October 14	at Homestead Library & Athletic Club	Steel Works Park; Homestead, PA	W 22–5	1,500–2,500	
October 21	Bucknell	Exposition Park; Allegheny City, PA	W 35–0	2,500–3,000	
October 28	Buffalo	Exposition Park; Allegheny City, PA	W 52–5		
November 4	Baltimore Medical	Exposition Park; Allegheny City, PA	W 31–0		
November 7	Homestead Library & Athletic Club	Exposition Park; Allegheny City, PA	W 53–0	2,000+	
November 11	Knickerbocker Athletic Club	Exposition Park; Allegheny City, PA	W 47–0		
November 18	Orange Athletic Club	Exposition Park; Allegheny City, PA	W 29–0	3,000	
November 25	Penn State	Exposition Park; Allegheny City, PA	W 64–5	3,500	
November 30	Washington & Jefferson	Exposition Park; Allegheny City, PA	W 18–0	15,000–18,000	
