= 1890 Greensburg Athletic Association season =

American football team season

1890 Greensburg Athletic Association football
- Record: Unknown

The 1890 season was the first season of the Greensburg Athletic Association. The team's record for this season is largely unknown.

== Schedule ==
| Date | Opponent | Site | Result | Source |
|---|---|---|---|---|
| November 8 | Kiskiminetas | Unnamed field (Note: Scheduled game site was "on a field along the Electric Street Railway".) · Greensburg, PA | L 4–34 | |
| November 15 | Indiana Normal | Greensburg, PA | T 6–6 | |
| November 22 | at Altoona | Cricket grounds · Altoona, PA | L 0–48 | |
| | Unknown Pittsburgh-area team (Note: Group of college boys home for Thanksgiving vacation supplemented the team for a game with an unknown Pittsburgh club at the Fairgrounds) | Fairgrounds · Greensburg, PA | L (Note: Resulted in a loss, but the score is unknown.) | |
