= Greensburg Red Wings =

- 1934–1939; Greensburg, Pennsylvania

Minor league affiliations
- Class: Class D (1934–1939)
- League: Pennsylvania State Association (1934–1939)

Major league affiliations
- Team: Washington Senators (1939); Independent (1938); Brooklyn Dodgers (1937); St. Louis Cardinals (1934–1936)

Minor league titles
- League titles (1): 1934

Team data
- Name: Greensburg Senators (1939); Greensburg Green Sox (1937–1938); Greensburg Red Wings (1935–1936); Greensburg Trojans (1934)
- Ballpark: Offutt Field (1934–1939)

The Greensburg Red Wings were a Class D Minor League Baseball team based in Greensburg, Pennsylvania. The team was a member of the Pennsylvania State Association, from 1934-1939 and played all of its home games at Offutt Field. The team's name often changed throughout their short existence. They began as the Greensburg Trojans, an affiliate of the St. Louis Cardinals. A year later, in 1935, the team was renamed the Greensburg Red Wings. However, in 1937 when the Brooklyn Dodgers took over the team, they were renamed the Greensburg Green Sox. Finally, the team was called the Greensburg Senators, after their final affiliate, the Washington Senators, in 1939.

== Notable moments ==
In the summer of 1936, the Major League Baseball's St. Louis Cardinals, behind Pepper Martin, defeated the Greensburg Red Wings, 11–0, in front of 1,500 spectators at Offutt Field. In 1937, the Greensburg Green Sox were instrumental in getting funds for lights at Offutt Field in the city, setting the stage for night high school football, which debuted that fall. The field hosted minor league teams that were affiliated with the Cardinals, Washington Senators, and Brooklyn Dodgers

== Major League alumni ==
- Johnny Blatnik (1939 Senators)
- Pete Center (1934 Trojans/1935 Red Wings)
- Joe Cleary (1938 Green Sox)
- Pat Cooper (1936 Red Wings)
- Red Davis (1935 Red Wings)
- Stan Ferens (1937 Green Sox/1939 Senators)
- Nick Goulish (1938 Green Sox)
- Otto Huber (1936 Red Wings)
- Ken Holcombe (1938 Green Sox)
- Eddie Lopat (1937 Green Sox)
- Rube Melton (1936 Red Wings)
- Heinie Mueller (1935 Red Wings)
- Eddie Morgan (1934 Trojans)
- Lynn Myers (1934 Trojans)
- Bob Scheffing (1935 Red Wings)
- Lou Scoffic (1934 Trojans)
- Bud Souchock (1939 Senators)
- Tom Sunkel (1934 Trojans)

== Season-by-season ==
Year	Record	Finish	Manager	Playoff series
1934	57-45	1st	Clay Hopper	League Champs vs. Washington Generals (4-2)
1935	39-64	6th	Arnold Anderson / Heinie Mueller	
1936	64-44	2nd	Clay Hopper	Lost League Finals vs. Jeannette Little Pirates (4-3)
1937	54-45	2nd	Wilbur Cooper	
1938	37-60	4th	Ollie Vanek	
1939	41-68	6th	George Mucci	
