= Richard Coulter Jr. =

World War I general and banker (1870–1955)

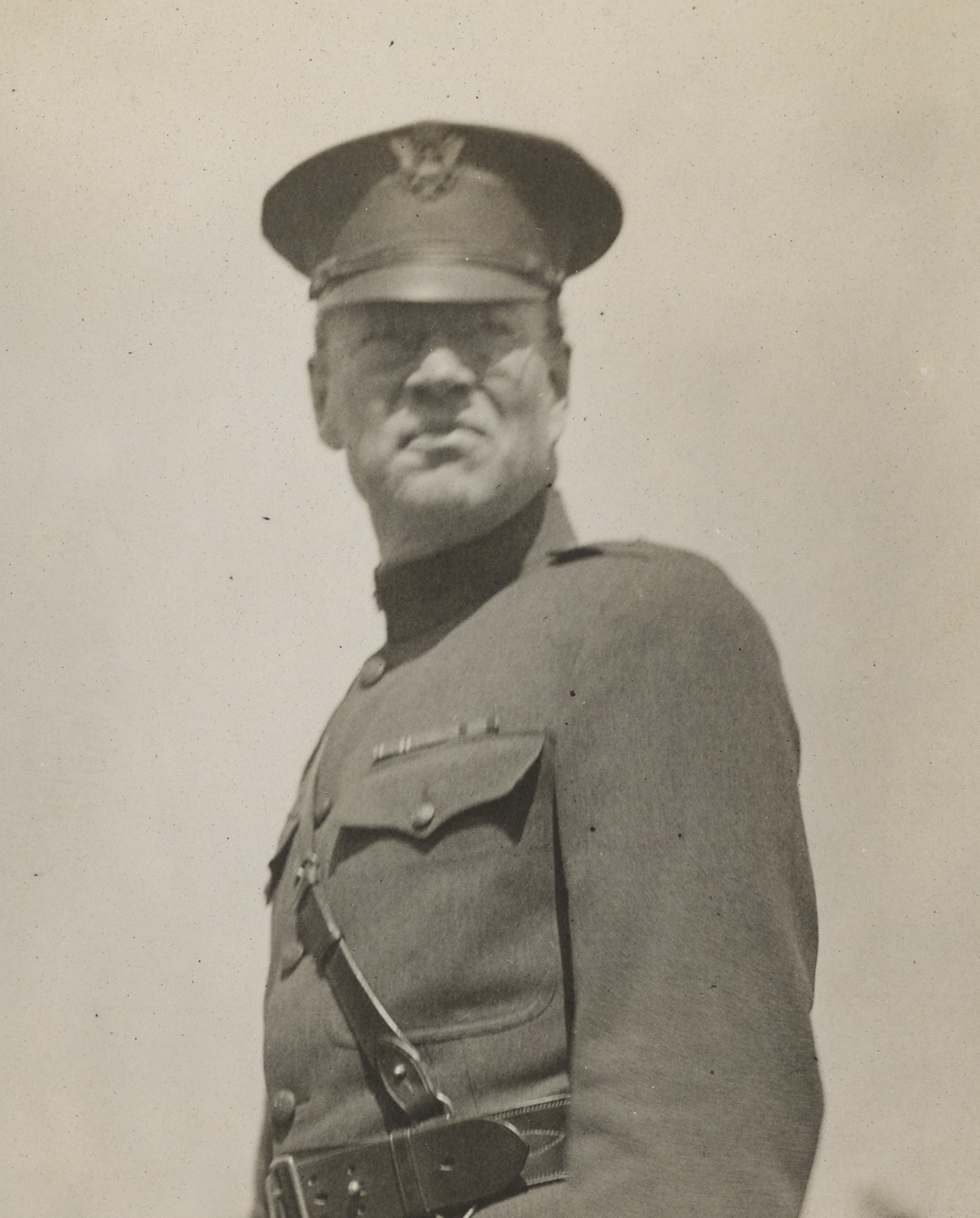
- Brig. gen. Richard Coulter in France, June 1918.
- Born: October 3, 1870; Greensburg, Pennsylvania, US
- Died: September 26, 1955 (aged 84); Greensburg, Pennsylvania, US
- Military career
- Allegiance: United States
- Branch: U.S. Army
- Service years: 1895–1919
- Rank: Brigadier general
- Units: 10th Pennsylvania Volunteer Infantry Regiment (1895–1914); 41st Infantry Division (1914–1918)
- Conflicts: Spanish–American War; Border War; World War I
- Football career

Profile
- Position: Offensive lineman

Career information
- College: Princeton

Career history
- 1894–1896: Greensburg Athletic Association

Richard Coulter Jr. (October 3, 1870 – September 26, 1955) was a World War I general, a businessman, a professional football player and a banker.

== Early life and career ==
Coulter was born in Greensburg, Westmoreland County, Pennsylvania, the first of six children of Richard Coulter Sr. (1827–1908) and Emma Welty (1841–1929). His father Richard Coulter Sr. was a major general in the American Civil War, a prominent business man in Greensburg, and founder of the First National Bank of Greensburg. Son Richard Coulter Jr. attended Princeton University, where he became a Charter Member of The Tiger Inn and a football standout. He graduated in 1892. After college, he worked for his father in business and banking. From 1894 to 1896, he played organized football with the Greensburg Athletic Association, one of the first professional teams. He served the team as an offensive lineman.

== Military career ==
Coulter began his military career as a private in the Pennsylvania National Guard in 1895. In 1898, he was commissioned a second lieutenant in the 10th Pennsylvania Volunteer Infantry Regiment.

=== Spanish–American War ===
In 1898, Coulter's Regiment was ordered to active duty in the Spanish–American War. Coulter was promoted to colonel of the 10th Regiment in 1907 and commanded the regiment on the U.S. border with Mexico in 1916. Pennsylvanian leaders considered Col. Coulter as the Democratic candidate for Governor of Pennsylvania in the 1916 election.

=== World War I ===
In 1914, Coulter commanded the 10th Pennsylvania Regiment when it was ordered to return to active duty once again in World War I. Shortly after that, he was promoted to brigadier general and transferred to the 41st Infantry Division. He was discharged from the national army in January 1919. He continued to command the 55th infantry Brigade of the 28th Division, Pennsylvania National Guard.

== Postbellum career ==
After World War I, Coulter returned to Greensburg, where he resumed his business and banking activities in the First National Bank of Greensburg (now the First Commonwealth Bank). After the death of his father Richard Coulter Sr. in 1908, Coulter Jr. served at the bank's president for more than 40 years. During the Great Depression in the early 1930s, the bank was reorganized, but continued to survive under Coulter's leadership. Coulter also headed several coal companies which owned coal mines under and around Greensburg.

== Personal life ==
Coulter married Matilda Bowman and had one daughter, Emma.

== Death ==
He died on September 26, 1955.
