= Jack Gass =

American football player (1875–1958)

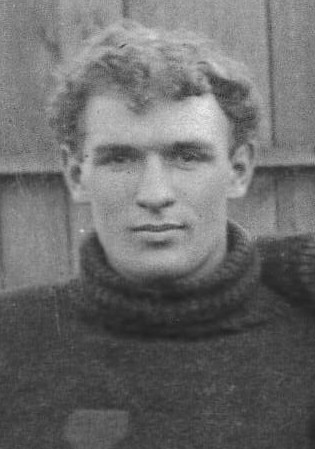
- Gass with Latrobe in 1897

Profile
- Positions: Halfback, end

Personal information
- Born: November 30, 1875; Washington, D.C.
- Died: February 7, 1958 (aged 82); Washington, D.C.

Career information
- College: Lehigh

Career history
- Latrobe Athletic Association (1897–1898); Western Pennsylvania All-Star team (1898); Latrobe Athletic Association (1900); Greensburg Athletic Association (1900)

Stuart John "Jack" Gass (November 30, 1875 – February 7, 1958) was an early professional football player. He played with the Latrobe Athletic Association in 1897, 1898 and 1900. In 1898, he was a member of the Western Pennsylvania All-Stars, which was a team put together by Latrobe manager Dave Berry for the purpose of challenging the star-filled Duquesne Country and Athletic Club to the first pro football all-star game held at Exposition Park in Pittsburgh. The All-Stars lost to Duquesne, 16–0. In 1897, Gass was a member of the very first all-professional football team, in Latrobe, to play a complete season together. In 1900, he played for Latrobe's rival, the Greensburg Athletic Association.
