= 1891 Greensburg Athletic Association season =

American football team season

1891 Greensburg Athletic Association football
- Record: Unknown
- Captain: Harry Null
- Home field: Electric Park

The 1891 Greensburg Athletic Association season was their second season in existence. The team's record for this season is largely unknown.

== Schedule ==
Date	Opponent	Result	Sources/notes
	East End Gyms	L?	(Note: According to a publication by the Professional Football Researchers Association, "it is believed" that Greensburg played and lost to the East End team, although no documented result has been found.)
October 24	at Allegheny Athletic Association	L 0–10	
December 12	Indiana Normal second team	L 4–8	
