= Ross Fiscus =

American football player and coach (1870–1950)

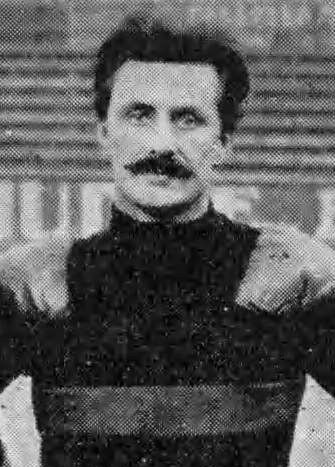
- Fiscus with the 1900 DC&AC football team

Profile
- Positions: Halfback, tackle, guard

Personal information
- Born: April 2, 1870; Armstrong Township, Pennsylvania, U.S.
- Died: November 6, 1950 (aged 80); Pittsburgh, Pennsylvania, U.S.
- Listed height: 5 ft 10 1/2 in (1.79 m)
- Listed weight: 174 lb (79 kg)

Career history

Playing
- Indiana Normal (1891–1892); Allegheny A. A. (1891–1894); Western U. of Pa. (1893); Washington & Jefferson (1894); Greensburg A. A. (1896); Geneva (1897); New Castle Terrors (1898); Grove City (1898); Youngstown Giants (1899); Duquesne C. & A. C. (1900)

Coaching
- Geneva (1897); New Castle Terrors (1898); Youngstown Giants (1899)

William Ross Fiscus (April 2, 1870 – November 6, 1950) was an early professional American football player and coach. He was one of the first pro players on record.

== Football career ==
Fiscus played for the Allegheny Athletic Association football team as a lineman in 1891 and 1892, but by 1893 he had successfully earned the role as halfback. He split his playing time in 1893 between the Allegheny Athletic Association and the Western University of Pennsylvania, later known as the University of Pittsburgh.

Fiscus began the 1894 season with Washington & Jefferson but soon dropped out to rejoin the Allegheny Athletic Association. The Pittsburgh Chronicle Telegraph that October characterized the 5-foot-10½-inch, 174-pound "old war horse" as a "terrific line bucker" who "frequently carries four and five men on his back". On November 24, Fiscus scored three touchdowns as the Three A's beat the Pittsburgh Athletic Club to win the local championship.

After suffering from typhoid fever during the 1895 football season, Fiscus returned to the field in 1896, playing alongside his brothers Lawson and Newell for the Greensburg Athletic Association.

In 1897, Fiscus became the second head football coach at Geneva College in Beaver Falls, Pennsylvania, which finished the season with a 3–4–1 record. Geneva College credits Fiscus as holding that position for three seasons, from 1897 until 1899. However, newspapers reported that former Duquesne Country and Athletic Club quarterback Floyd Rose was coaching Geneva as of September 1898.

In September 1898, Fiscus became captain and coach of the New Castle (Pennsylvania) Terrors, and by October joined the Grove City College team. He was injured after a Grove City game at Westminster College when a hooligan batted him over the head with a loaded cane.

He was player-coach for the Youngstown (Ohio) Giants in 1899; the Youngstown Vindicator dubbed him "King" Fiscus. He closed out his football career in 1900 as a reserve with the Duquesne Country and Athletic Club.

In an article published in 2023 by the Professional Football Researchers Association, he was named to an "All-Era" (1890–1903) team based on an analysis of game reports.

== Later life ==
After football, Fiscus lived in Pittsburgh and worked as a construction superintendent. He lost his right eye in a construction blasting accident in 1903. He died November 6, 1950, at his home in Pittsburgh's Mount Washington neighborhood.

== College head coaching record ==
Year	Team	Overall	Conference	Standing	Bowl/playoffs
Geneva Covenanters (Independent) (1897–1899)
1897	Geneva	3–4–1			
Total:		3–4–1			
