= Charles Rinehart =

American football player, engineer and businessman (1875–1933)

- Rinehart as an All-America selection at Lafayette, c. 1897

Profile
- Position: Guard

Personal information
- Born: December 31, 1875; Uniontown, New Jersey, U.S.
- Died: October 30, 1933 (aged 57)

Career information
- College: Lafayette College

Career history
- Greensburg Athletic Association (1898–1900); Western Pennsylvania All-Stars (1898)

Awards and highlights
- Second-team All-American (1897)
- College Football Hall of Fame

Charles Ramsay Rinehart (December 31, 1875 – October 30, 1933) was an American football player, engineer and businessman. He was elected to the College Football Hall of Fame in 1964. He played high school football at Phillipsburg High School in Phillipsburg, New Jersey.

== Playing career ==
=== College career ===
Rinehart attended Lafayette and played right guard on the school's 1896 team, under coach Parke H. Davis. At 6'3" and 210 pounds, "Babe" or "Riny" was the biggest man on the team. That season Rinehart and Lafayette fought Princeton to a scoreless tie. Thirty-seven years later, the two teams were named co-national champions for the season by Coach Davis, who had become the sport's pre-eminent historian. In 1934, Davis wrote that Rinehart was "the peer of any player whoever wore a cleated shoe" and "often has been named, with Walter Heffelfinger of Yale, as one of the two greatest foot ball players of all time."

Rinehart captained and played quarterback for the team in 1897. He graduated from Lafayette in 1899 and became an engineer. Rinehart was serving as the president of a tire company at the time of his death.

=== Professional career ===
From 1898 until 1900, Rinehart played professional football for the Greensburg Athletic Association. He also played, against the Greensburg Athletic Association's wishes, in pro football's very first all-star game as a member of the 1898 Western Pennsylvania All-Star football team, which played against the Duquesne Country and Athletic Club on December 3, 1898, at Pittsburgh's Exposition Park.
