= Greensburg Athletic Association =

Football team in Pennsylvania, US

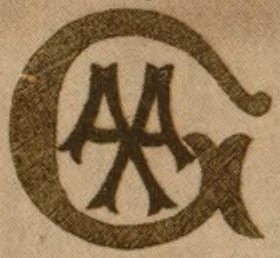
Logo

General information
- Founded: 1890
- Folded: 1900
- Stadium: Athletic Park
- Headquartered: Greensburg, Pennsylvania, U.S.
- Colors: Maroon, White

Personnel
- General manager: Lloyd B. Huff (1893); J. E. Mitinger (1895–1900)
- Head coach: Charlie Atherton (1894–1895); Alfred Sigman (1896); George Barclay (1897–1899); Ralph Hutchinson (1900)

Nickname
- "Greenies"

League / conference affiliations
- Independent

The Greensburg Athletic Association was an early organized football team, based in Greensburg, Pennsylvania, that played from 1890 until 1900. At times referred to as the Greensburg Athletic Club, the team began as an amateur football club in 1890 and was composed primarily of locals before several professional players were added for the 1895 season. In 1894 it was discovered that the team had secretly paid formerly Indiana Normal (now Indiana University of Pennsylvania) player, Lawson Fiscus, to play football and retained his services on salary. The team was the chief rival of another early professional football team, the Latrobe Athletic Association.

Aside from Fiscus, the Greensburg Athletic Association included several of the era's top players, such as: Charlie Atherton, George Barclay, Ross Fiscus, Jack Gass, Arthur McFarland, Charles Rinehart, Isaac Seneca and Adam Martin Wyant. Several of these players revolutionized the game during their playing careers. Charlie Atherton is credited with inventing the place kick, and George Barclay invented the first-ever football helmet. Meanwhile, Isaac Seneca became the first Native-American to earn All-American honors and Adam Martin Wyant was the first professional football player to become a United States Congressman.

The team's home games were played at Athletic Park (which was later renamed Offutt Field). The field is still in use as football field by Greensburg Salem High School and, up until 1993, Greensburg Central Catholic High School.

== History ==
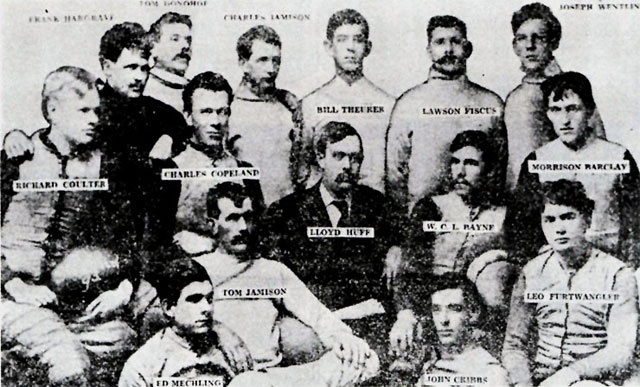
Greensburg Athletic Association, 1893

=== Amateur era ===
The first four years of Greensburg Athletic Association football that began with the 1890 season, through 1893, were not particularly successful. The drawbacks included a lack of local opponents, rivalries which did not develop until later as well as a lack of local experienced players.

The Greensburg Athletic Association kicked off its inaugural season in 1890. Their first game resulted in 6–6 tie against Indiana Normal (IUP), while losing their first-ever home game to the Kiskiminetas Springs School, 34–4. A group of college students, which of whom returned home to Greensburg for Thanksgiving vacation, played for the team for a game against an unknown Pittsburgh club to close out the season. However, the team, filled with supplement players, lost to the Pittsburgh club by a narrow margin. During the 1891 season, the club played at least one game, suffering a loss against one of the top football athletic clubs in Pittsburgh, the Allegheny Athletic Association. The surviving records of the club's 1892 campaign show only three games being played, a 28–0 win against Uniontown and losses against Western University of Pennsylvania (today the University of Pittsburgh), 6–2, and the Pittsburgh Athletic Club, 28–0.

In 1893, Greensburg placed a higher emphasis on its football program. The four known games from that season resulted in a record of 1–2–1.

=== Glory years ===
==== 1894 ====
In 1894 Greensburg hired its first professional player, Lawson Fiscus, for $20 a game plus expenses. While Fiscus did play for Greensburg as an amateur in 1893, he was actively recruited by several other teams as professionalism in football began to take hold. Fiscus played informal football at Indiana Normal, even before it even fielded a school team. He has also played at halfback for the Allegheny Athletic Association as well as for Princeton University.

During the 1894 season, Greensburg jumped out to a 5–0 record before losing 10–0 to the Altoona Athletic Club. A week later, a game against the Jeannette Athletic Club ended at halftime due to disagreement between the two teams. The disagreement regarded the tough play of Greensburg's Lawson Fiscus, who was accused of kicking or stepping on the face of one of the Jeannette players during the game. A rematch between Greensburg and Altoona was held on Thanksgiving Day. This time, Greensburg defeated Altoona 6–4 in front of about 2,500 fans. During this era, a touchdown accounted for four points and the "goal after" for two. Greensburg's successful season record of 6–1–1 led to an increased interest in football throughout Western Pennsylvania. Fans now turned out in large numbers for games, and even accompanied the team by train to road games. And while Fiscus was the only paid player on the 1894 team, several other pros joined him in 1895.

==== 1895 ====
Greensburg's 1895 season opened and closed with games against the Latrobe Athletic Association, from nearby Latrobe, which served as Greensburg's chief rival. The Latrobe team had an impressive squad led by John Brallier who became the first football player to admit to being a paid professional. Greensburg won the opening game 25–0 over Latrobe, and the second game 42–2 over Western University of Pennsylvania, to start the season 2–0. Soon afterward, Fiscus and two former Penn State University players, Charlie Atherton (who was also the team's coach) and Fred Robison, turned down an offer promising each of them $125 a month to play for the upstart Duquesne Country and Athletic Club, located in Pittsburgh. They were induced to stay with Greensburg when "interested parties" in that city raised some extra money to guarantee to the players. After a 6–0 start the team tied the Pittsburgh Athletic Club 0–0 at P.A.C. Park.

The following week, Greensburg was defeated by the Duquesne Country and Athletic Club at Exposition Park, 14–0, in what was seen as a controversial game. A local resident with ties to Duquesne was substituted for the scheduled official. This resulted in what the Greensburg Daily Tribune called bad officiating and "thievery". A touchdown was said to have been scored by Duquesne after time was called, along with rough play. However Greensburg soon recovered and finished their season with a 9–1–1 record. However, the score and the outcome of Greensburg's final game against Latrobe is disputed by historians. While Greensburg and Latrobe records both indicate a 4–0 Greensburg win, one Pittsburgh newspaper reported the game ended in 4–0 Latrobe victory.

==== 1896 ====
For 1896, Alfred Sigman of Lafayette College became the team's fullback and coach, and two more Fiscus brothers, Ross and Newell, were added to the team. Greensburg began their season 5–0, which included wins over the Pittsburgh Athletic Club and Latrobe. The team was acclaimed by Pittsburgh papers at mid-season as being the best in Pennsylvania. During a game against a squad from Beaver Falls, Greensburg's Tom Donohoe ran 44 yards with an intercepted pass (presumably a lateral, since the forward pass was not legal until 1906).

On October 17, Greensburg defeated the Pittsburgh Athletic Club for the first time, posting a 14–0 win at home. All three of the game's touchdowns were scored by Lawson Fiscus. On October 31, Greensburg defeated Latrobe, 10–4. In the stands there was considerable betting over whether Latrobe would score or not. Late in the game Latrobe's Doggie Trenchard scored a touchdown, prompting a Latrobe newspaper to remark: "Greensburg got the game and Latrobe got the cash."

Greensburg's hopes of winning a state championship were dashed when the club was finally defeated by the Duquesne Country and Athletic Club in Pittsburgh, 18–4, on November 14. The game was followed by a scoreless tie with Pittsburgh Athletic Club. Greensburg did recover from their road trip to post a 10–0 win over Latrobe on Thanksgiving Day to end the season 6–1–1.

==== 1897 ====
The 1897 season marked the pinnacle of the professional football era in Greensburg. That year's squad had 27 players, which included a number of new ones. Among those players was George Barclay, of Millville, who played a halfback at Bucknell University and Lafayette University. Barclay brought several of Lafayette's top players with him to Greensburg to enhance the team. Greensburg went on to post a 10–1 record. The team's only defeat came at a 12–6 loss in the ninth game to Latrobe. However, the outcome of that game was reversed by a 6–0 score in a season-ending rematch at Latrobe. Greensburg, along with Washington and Jefferson College, had the best football records in Pennsylvania for the 1897 season. Barclay, however, was the only Greensburg player among the eleven named by The Pittsburg Times to their “All-Western Pennsylvania” team.

=== Decline ===
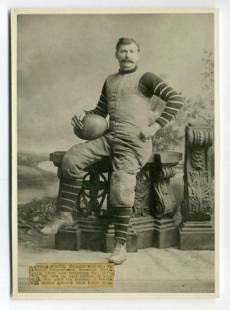
Lawson Fiscus

The start of the 1898 season saw optimism in Greensburg with the return of ex-coach Charlie Atherton. However, some of the players from the 1897 season had bigger offers to play elsewhere and left the team. Replacing these players proved hard since the amount of money to lure new talent to Greensburg was hard to come by in a small city. However, as early as 1898, the team featured Christy Mathewson, a future baseball hall of famer and former fullback from Bucknell University, in their line-up.

Greensburg's first game that season was against their rivals, Latrobe. The game was played on a field so muddy that the game had to be delayed at one point so that mud could be removed from the eyes, nose, mouth and ears of Latrobe's Ed Abbaticchio, who was buried in the mud on one of his carries. Latrobe went on to win the game 6–0 (4–0 by other accounts). The 1898 season would go on to be marred with another loss to Latrobe, and ties against Duquesne Country and Athletic Club and the Pittsburgh Athletic Club. However, the team later turned things around to finish the season strong. In the final game of the season, Greensburg beat rival Latrobe 6–0 at Latrobe. According to the Greensburg Daily Tribune, the end of the game was marred by stoning and spitting on Greensburg players and fans, "boorish conduct by ruffians," resulting in one player being injured when he was hit on the head by a rock.

At the end of the season, against their club's wishes, Greensburg's Charles Rinehart and George Barclay played in the first pro football all-star game for the 1898 Western Pennsylvania All-Star football team, against the Duquesne Country and Athletic Club, on December 3, 1898. The all-star team was put together by Latrobe manager Dave Berry and resulted in 16–0 Duquesne win. For reasons that are still unclear, Greensburg leaders opposed the game and did their best to discourage their players from taking part.

After an apparent decline in financial resources and interest, professional football in Greensburg and Latrobe underwent a one-year hiatus in 1899. Some efforts were made to reorganize a team around a core of local members of the 1898 squad, which would have to be shored up by obtaining some Latrobe players. This effort never materialized. When the 1899 season began, most of the top Greensburg players of the year before were playing for either Greensburg's rivals in Pittsburgh or for other teams as far away as Newark, New Jersey. As result of not having a Greensburg or Latrobe team in 1899, the football clubs from Pittsburgh completed their schedules by playing teams mainly from eastern Pennsylvania.

==== Final season ====
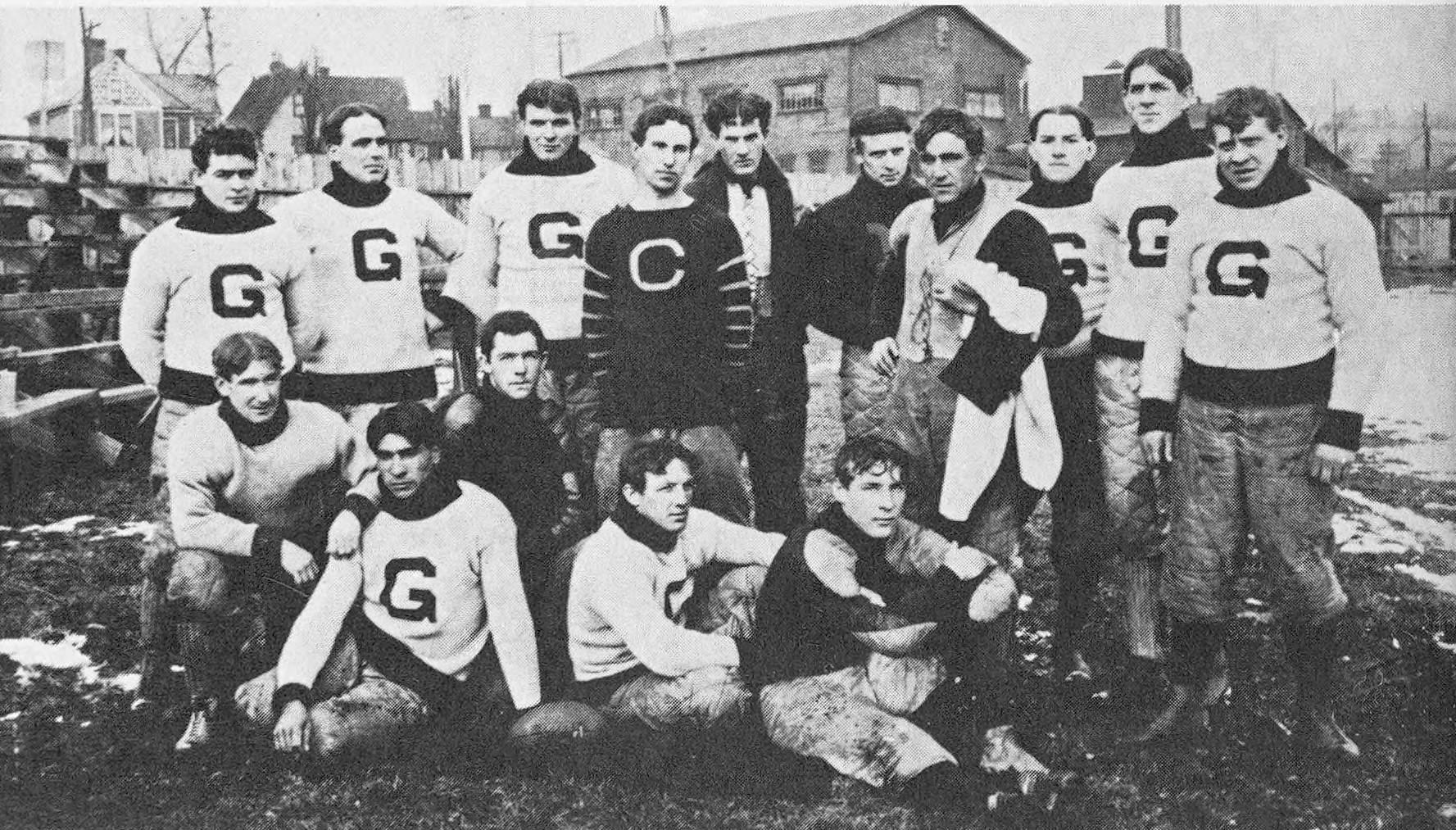
Greensburg team in 1900

In 1900, plans were complete for the return of professional football to Greensburg. Under the financial direction of industrialist Morris L. Painter, Greensburg once again fielded a team. Many of the players were from eastern and midwestern colleges and universities. The top sought player for the 1900 season, Ralph Hutchinson of Princeton, signed with Greensburg as a player-coach. Meanwhile, Isaac Seneca, a former All-American from the Carlisle Indian School, was also signed to the team. Also that year, Latrobe's team was reorganized by the team's long-time manager, Dave Berry. Soon a three-game series had been arranged between Latrobe and Greensburg which provided for a home-and-home series, with a third game at the site which drew the largest crowd.

Greensburg began the season 3–0–1, before losing 6–5 to the Homestead Library & Athletic Club, a Pittsburgh-area team financed heavily by the Carnegie Steel Company. Newspapers in Greensburg called it "the greatest contest ever witnessed on the Greensburg gridiron". The game also featured a match-up between two of the era's star players: Homestead's Art Poe and Greensburg's Isaac Seneca. Greensburg newspaper accounts of the day state that Seneca outplayed Poe. However, the Greensburg club did sustain several key injuries during the game.

By this time Greensburg was unable to regain its footing. A loss at home, this time to Latrobe, was sustained a week later on October 27. During the game a fight between Seneca and the Latrobe quarterback, named Kennedy, led to a riot between the opposing fans and players. This riot prompted the Westmoreland County Sheriff's Office to devise a heightened security plan for the return game in Latrobe. On October 31, the Greensburg team, still injury-plagued, suffered a third consecutive loss, 24–0, to Duquesne Country and Athletic Club at Exposition Park. Greensburg's final win, 22–0 over Altoona, came on November 5. However, the team was defeated again by Homestead five days later.

The final professional football game for Greensburg took place on November 17 in Latrobe. Latrobe would go on to win the game, 11–0, claiming the championship of Westmoreland County. By this time, the Greensburg team was experiencing major financial problems. To make matters worse, the club's scheduled next-to-last game was cancelled because of inclement weather. Worse yet, Latrobe, which always drew large crowds when they played Greensburg, withdrew from a scheduled Thanksgiving Day game. Latrobe paid a $400 forfeit and withdrew from the Thanksgiving Day game at Greensburg to play against Duquesne instead. However, that game also had to be cancelled because of extreme weather conditions. Greensburg's final season record was 4–5–1.

== Legacy ==
Although there were probably others, several members of the 1895 squad who were known to have been paid to play football were Fiscus, guard-quarterback Adam Wyant of Bucknell and the University of Chicago, and fullback Charles Atherton and halfback Fred Robison, both of Penn State. Wyant was cited by his coach at Chicago, Amos Alonzo Stagg, as "one of the best men that ever donned the canvas jacket" (then part of the uniform). Wyant also served at one time as principal of the Greensburg schools and became a U.S. Congressman from the Greensburg area. He would go on to be the first U.S. Congressman to have played professional football.
