= 1898 Western Pennsylvania All-Star football team =

American football team

First Pro Football All-Star Game (1898)
Western Pennsylvania All-Stars (0-0-0)	Duquesne Country and Athletic Club (7-0-1)
0	16
Head coach: Dave Berry	Head coach: William Chase Temple
	1	2	3	4	OT	Total
W.PA All-Stars	0	0	0	0	0	0
D.C & A.C.	0	5	6	5	0	16
- Date: December 3, 1898
- Stadium: Exposition Park; Allegheny, Pennsylvania
- Attendance: 1,500

The 1898 Western Pennsylvania All-Star football team was a collection of early football players, from several teams in the area, to form an all-star team. The team was formed by Dave Berry, the manager of the Latrobe Athletic Association, for the purpose of playing the Duquesne Country and Athletic Club, which fielded a team composed of many of the game's stars from the era. The game between the two clubs ended in a 16-0 Duquesne victory and is considered to be the first all-star game for professional football. Contrary to popular belief, while the game was held at Exposition Park, which would be currently located inside of the city limits of Pittsburgh, Pennsylvania, the 1898 location of the game was Allegheny, Pennsylvania which was not incorporated into the city of Pittsburgh until 1907.

== History ==
=== Origin ===
At the end of the Duquesne Country and Athletic Club's 1897 season, the club signed a number of talented players to contracts for the upcoming 1898 season. However, in April 1898, the Spanish–American War began. As a result, many of the team's recently signed players ended up in the United States Army. Looking for a solution to the problem, Duquesne manager William Chase Temple went out and signed up replacement players. Temple succeeded, and he received excellent results, when it was noticed that some of the replacements actually ended up being even more talented than the original contracted stars.

However that August, the war ended, with an American victory, and the soldiers quickly returned home. As a result, the Duquesnes suddenly found themselves with a surplus of pro football stars under contract. The team had so much depth, that its benchwarmers would have starred for lesser teams. The amount of talent on the field was also reflected on the team's ledgers. Due to the high payroll, Temple eventually took over the payments to the athletes, thus becoming the first individual professional football team owner.

After a 7–0–1 season, the Duquesnes' team was being compared favorably with the 1896 team put together for a two-game stand by the Allegheny Athletic Association, featuring Pudge Heffelfinger.

=== Fielding an all-star team ===
However Latrobe manager Dave Berry knew the all-star depth of the Duquesne team. He then conceived the idea of opposing the Duquesnes with an all-star team that drawn from the best players from all the other area teams. A game between the two teams was then arranged for Saturday, December 3, at Exposition Park. Berry began signing up stars, however he did not sign up everyone that he wanted. The leaders of the Greensburg Athletic Association opposed the game and did their best to discourage their players from taking part in it. The Washington & Jefferson Presidents football team also followed by disallowing their players from taking part in the game. Sam Boyle, an end from Penn, was asked by Berry to be the team's captain, however he declined. No members from the Pittsburgh Athletic Club appeared on the team either. Berry was forced to rely heavily on his own Latrobe team, which fielded Eddie Wood, Doggie Trenchard, Harry Ryan, George Krebs, Bill Hammer, Jack Gass and Grennie Lewis. However George Barclay and Babe Rinehart, both from the Greensburg Athletic Association, decided to play on Berry's team despite the warnings given to them by Greensburg officials not to do so.

== The game ==
The All-Stars were outplayed by their Duquesne opponents. While both teams consisted of top tier players, the All-Stars consisted of much individual talent but no teamwork. Meanwhile, Duquesne played the entire 1898 season together and formed the bonds of teamwork during that time. A little into the second quarter, Duquesne scored with a Roy Jackson touchdown. However, they could not convert the extra point, and the score stood 5–0 at halftime (touchdowns were only 5 points at the time). In the third quarter, Duquesne's J.A. Gammons ran 60 yards for a touchdown on a punt return. Roy Jackson scored Duquesne's third touchdown late in the game, after the team put together a scoring drive of 80 yards on just four plays. The extra point attempt failed, however the game ended in a 16–0 Duquesne win.

Hours before the start of his all-star game, Dave Berry was "arrested" by one of his Latrobe players for a debt he claimed Berry owed him. Berry paid the $33 owed and then had the player arrested on false arrest charges.

=== Box score ===
Quarter	1	2	3	4	Total
All-Stars	0	0	0	0	0
Duquesne C. & A.C.	0	5	6	5	16

at Exposition Park, Allegheny, Pennsylvania

- Date: December 3, 1898

Game information
- D.C & A.C. – TD: Roy Jackson unknown yard run 5–0 D.C & A.C.
- D.C & A.C. – TD: J.A. Gammons 60 yards touchdown on a punt return (Extra point converted) 11–0 D.C & A.C.
- D.C & A.C. – TD: Roy Jackson unknown yard run 16-0 D.C & A.C.

=== Attendance ===
Attendance for the game was only 1,500 people. Part of the blame was due to many Pittsburghers considering the football season over with the Thanksgiving Day games. Uncertain weather was also blamed for the poor attendance. However most of the blame went to the leaders of the Greensburg Athletic Association, who were accused of spreading rumors that various star players would not appear in the game.
