= Roy Jackson (American football) =

American football player and coach (1876–1944)

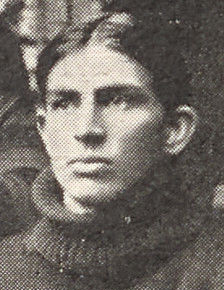
- Jackson on 1897 Penn football team

Profile
- Positions: End, Fullback

Personal information
- Born: February 12, 1876; Rising Sun, Delaware, U.S.
- Died: January 22, 1944 (aged 67)

Career information
- College: Penn

Career history

Playing
- 1898–1900: Duquesne Country and Athletic Club

Coaching
- 1898–1900: Duquesne Country and Athletic Club
- 1900: Pittsburgh

Awards and highlights
- 2× W. Pennsylvania Champion (1898, 1899); Played in Pro Football's first All-Star Game

M. Roy "Slab" Jackson (February 12, 1876 – January 22, 1944) was an American football player and coach. He played for the Duquesne Country and Athletic Club and served as the team's captain and coach from 1898 to 1900. He played for Duquesne against the 1898 Western Pennsylvania All-Star football team in the first professional football all-star game. He served as the sixth coach of the Pittsburgh Panthers in 1900.

He married into the Rockefeller family. He was an avid fox hunter and served as master of foxhounds at Radnor Hunt from 1929 to 1944. He was responsible for bringing the Penn-Marydel foxhound to the United States.

== Early life and education ==
He played college football and baseball at the University of Pennsylvania. His played as a substitute on the 1896 team, as halfback on the 1897 team, and as second baseman on the baseball team. He graduated with a degree in dentistry.

== Career ==
Jackson, a fullback, scored 14 touchdowns, often on short plunges after teammates J. A. Gammons or Dave Fultz had put the ball close to the end zone. In 1898, Jackson played for Duquesne against the 1898 Western Pennsylvania All-Star football team in the first pro football all-star game. During the game, he would score two of the Duquesnes touchdowns.

In 1900, he served as the 6th coach for the Pittsburgh Panthers football team, posting a 5–4 record. He worked as a dentist in Pittsburgh, Pennsylvania, but left that vocation to work in industry.

He died on January 22, 1944, and was interred at West Laurel Hill Cemetery in Bala Cynwyd, Pennsylvania.

== Personal life ==
In 1901, he married Lenore Schoen. Together they had two daughters but she died in 1918. In 1929, he married Almira Rockefeller, the daughter of William Goodsell Rockefeller, and together they had a son.

Jackson was an avid foxhunter and served as master of foxhounds at Radnor Hunt from 1929 to 1944. He kept pleasure horses and was responsible for bringing the Penn-Marydel foxhound to the United States.

Jackson was named as executor of the 200-acre Kirkwood Farm in Willistown Township, Pennsylvania, after the death of Hardie Scott. The farm was sold to M. Night Shyamalan in 2023 for US$24 million.

== Head coaching record ==
Year	Team	Overall	Conference	Standing	Bowl/playoffs
Western University of Pennsylvania (Independent) (1900)
1900	Western University of Pennsylvania	5–4			
Western University of Pennsylvania:		5–4			
Total:		5–4			
