= Fred A. Robison =

American football coach (1876–1954)

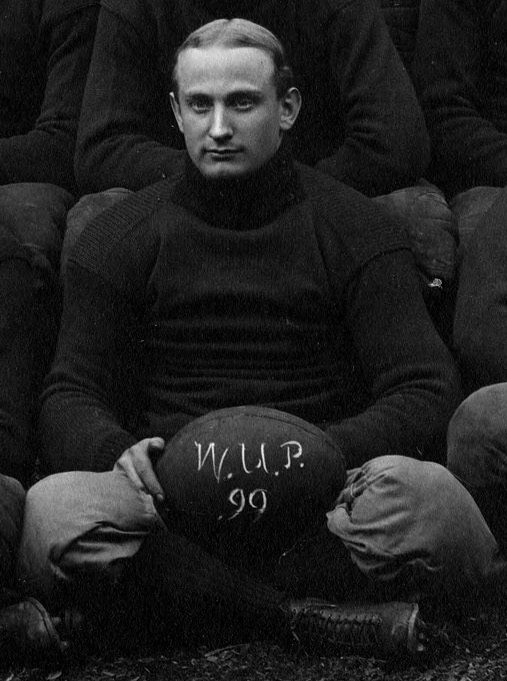

Biographical details
- Born: February 21, 1876; Marble Rock, Iowa
- Died: August 11, 1954 (aged 78); State College, Pennsylvania

Playing career
- 1894: Penn State
- 1895: Greensburg Athletic Association
- 1896: Pittsburgh Athletic Club
- 1897: Greensburg Athletic Association
- 1898–1899: Western University of Pennsylvania
- 1900: Greensburg Athletic Association
- Position: Halfback

Coaching career (HC unless noted)
- 1898–1899: Western University of Pennsylvania

Head coaching record
- Overall: 8–3–2

Frederick Arthur Robison (often misspelled Robinson; February 21, 1876 – August 11, 1954) was an early professional American football player and a college football player and coach.

== Football career ==
A halfback, Robison played college football for Penn State before joining the Greensburg Athletic Association, one of the first football teams to pay players, in 1895. During that season, he was offered $125 a month to play for the Duquesne Country and Athletic Club, but accepted a counteroffer to remain at Greensburg. He spent the next season with the Pittsburgh Athletic Club before returning to Greensburg in 1897. He was the head football coach at Western University of Pennsylvania—now known as the University of Pittsburgh–from 1898 to 1899 seasons, compiling a record of 8–3–2. He played once again for Greensburg in 1900.

== Head coaching record ==
Year	Team	Overall	Conference	Standing	Bowl/playoffs
Western University of Pennsylvania (Independent) (1898–1899)
1898	Western University of Pennsylvania	5–2–1			
1899	Western University of Pennsylvania	3–1–1			
Western University of Pennsylvania:		8–3–2			
Total:		8–3–2			
