= Thomas Trenchard =

American football player and coach (1874–1943)

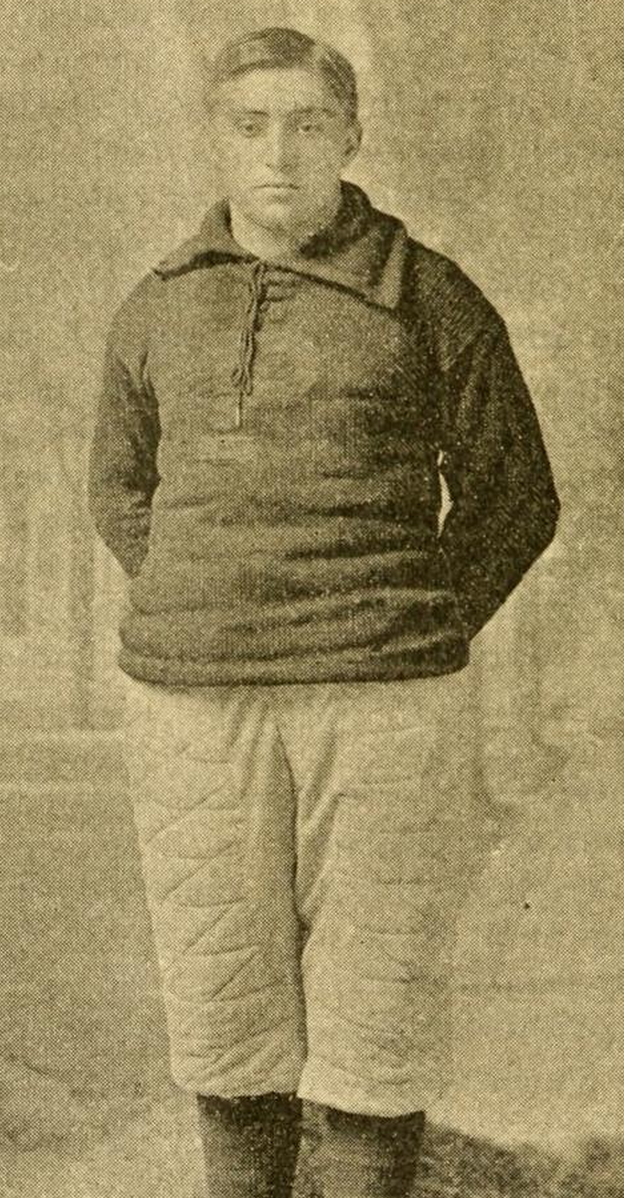
- Trenchard pictured in Spalding's Official Foot Ball Guide, 1893

Biographical details
- Born: May 3, 1874; Queen Anne's County, Maryland, U.S.
- Died: October 16, 1943 (aged 69); Baldwin, New York, U.S.
- Education: Princeton University

Playing career
- 1892–1894: Princeton
- 1896: Allegheny Athletic Association
- 1897–1898: Latrobe Athletic Association
- 1898: Western Pa. All-Star Team
- 1900: Latrobe Athletic Association
- Position: End

Coaching career (HC unless noted)
- 1895: North Carolina
- 1896: West Virginia
- 1897: Western U. of Pennsylvania
- 1899: Washington and Lee
- 1901: Washington and Lee
- 1913–1915: North Carolina

Head coaching record
- Overall: 34–28–6

Accomplishments and honors

Awards
- Consensus All-American (1893)

Thomas Gawthrop "Doggie" Trenchard (May 3, 1874 – October 16, 1943) was an All-American football player at Princeton University in 1893 and a college football head coach at the University of North Carolina at Chapel Hill, the University of Pittsburgh, and West Virginia University.

== Early life and playing career ==
Trenchard was born in Queen Anne's County, Maryland. During his early coaching career, Trenchard played professional football in 1896 for the Allegheny Athletic Association and in 1897, 1898 and 1900 for the Latrobe Athletic Association. He also played for the 1898 Western Pennsylvania All-Star football team, formed by Latrobe manager Dave Berry.

His nickname "Doggie" has been attributed to doggedness or dog-like qualities in his play; the New York World noted in 1892 that "he has the experienced player's keen scent for the ball and is off in pursuit with the swiftness and pertinacity of a well-trained beagle." Alternative explanations point to his supposedly shaggy hair or an incident in which he allegedly bit an opponent.

== Coaching career ==
In 1895, and from 1913 to 1915, he coached at North Carolina, where he compiled a 26–9–2 record. His best season there came in 1914, when North Carolina started the season 10–0 before losing its final game to Virginia. In 1896, he coached at West Virginia and compiled a 3–7–2 record. In 1897, he coached at Pittsburgh, and compiled a 1–3 record.

== Head coaching record ==
Year	Team	Overall	Conference	Standing	Bowl/playoffs
North Carolina Tar Heels (Independent) (1895)
1895	North Carolina	7–1–1			
West Virginia Mountaineers (Independent) (1896)
1896	West Virginia	3–7–2			
West Virginia:		3–7–2			
Western University of Pennsylvania (Independent) (1897)
1897	Western University of Pennsylvania	1–3			
Western University of Pennsylvania:		1–3			
Washington and Lee Generals (Independent) (1899)
1899	Washington and Lee	1–5–2			
Washington and Lee Generals (Independent) (1901)
1901	Washington and Lee	3–4			
Washington and Lee:		4–9–2			
North Carolina Tar Heels (South Atlantic Intercollegiate Athletic Association) (1913–1915)
1913	North Carolina	5–4	0–3	7th	
1914	North Carolina	10–1	1–1	T–3rd	
1915	North Carolina	4–3–1	0–2	T–8th	
North Carolina:		26–9–2			
Total:		34–28–6			
