= Duquesne Country and Athletic Club =

American football team in Pennsylvania (1895–1900)

Logo

General information
- Founded: 1895; 131 years ago
- Folded: 1900; 126 years ago
- Stadium: Exposition Park
- Headquartered: Pittsburgh, Pennsylvania, United States
- Colors: Red, Black

Personnel
- Owner: William C. Temple (1898)

League / conference affiliations
- Independent

The Duquesne Country and Athletic Club (DC&AC) was a professional football team based in Pittsburgh, Pennsylvania from 1895 until 1900. The team was considered one of the best, if not the best, professional football teams in the country from 1898 until 1900. The team has been credited as the first football franchise to be owned by an individual, William Chase Temple.

== Origin ==
The Duquesne Country and Athletic Club started playing in 1895. Despite a stated intent to field only amateurs, the team that year is known to have offered payments to three Greensburg Athletic Association players—Charlie Atherton, Fred Robison, and Lawson Fiscus—to play for the DC&AC. The three players ultimately accepted counteroffers to remain with Greensburg. Possible professionals on the initial Duquesne roster included end John Van Cleve, who had previously played for pay, and fullback and team captain Ed Young.

The team claimed the local championship in its first year with a season-ending win against the Pittsburgh Athletic Club. It was Pittsburgh's strongest team for the next two years as well (with the exception of the 1896 Allegheny Athletic Association, which played only two games).

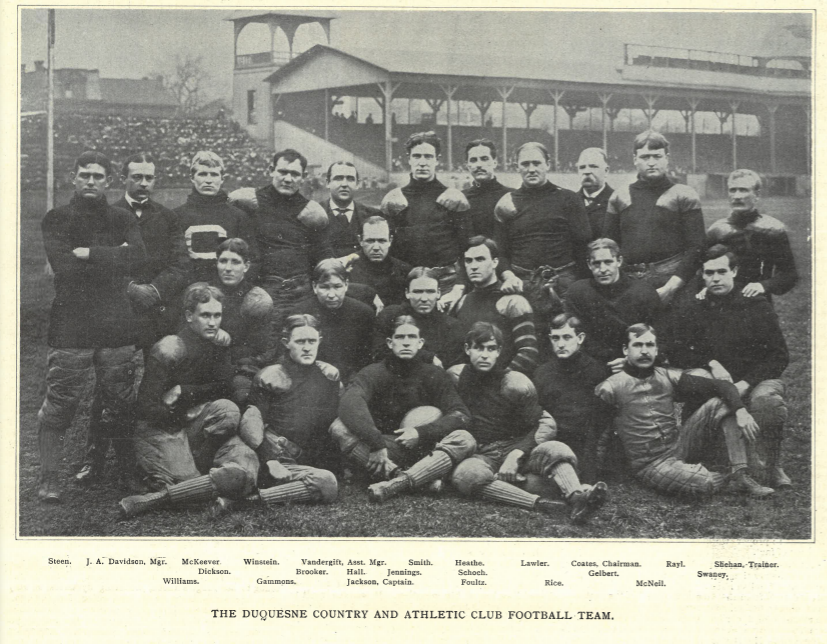
The 1899 team at Expo Park

== Open professionalism ==
In 1898, after three years as an ostensibly amateur team, the DC&AC took the step of becoming openly professional. According to team chairman William C. Temple, it was the club's intent to "put up the best article of football that could be procured for money; we would get the best men and pay the best prices." He argued that paying players satisfied growing public expectations for high-quality football and gave the club greater control over training and preparation than could be expected with amateurs. According to the New York Sun, the team was "generally regarded as the chief exponent of professionalism" in football.

It became apparent that the bench-warmers for the Duquesnes would be star players on lesser teams. Players such as end M. P. Randolph, tackle Otto Wagonhurst, guard John Winstein, and back Don McNeil would have been regulars for the rival Pittsburgh Athletic Club.

The profusion of talent on the 1898 team has been credited by legend to the Spanish–American War. After the 1897 season, the club had supposedly signed a number of good players to contracts for the next year. When many of the players went into the army in the spring to fight in the war, the Duquesnes signed replacements, some of whom were superior to the originals. Then when the war ended in just a few short months and the original players returned home, the Duquesnes found themselves with a surplus of expensive stars.

== All-star game ==
At the end of the 1898 season, Dave Berry, the manager of the Latrobe Athletic Association came up with the idea fielding a team composed of best players, drawn from all of the other area teams. That team would then play the Duquesnes in an all-star game. Berry was able to get many of the players that he wanted for his all-star team, but not all of them. In Greensburg, local leaders urged players from the Greensburg Athletic Association not to play in the game. Also many other players had baseball to prepare for and did not bother with the game. However, the game was a go and was arranged for Saturday, December 3 at Exposition Park. The Duquesnes went on to win the game 16–0.

== First individual owner ==
When it became apparent around this time that the Duquesnes could not survive financially while paying its players, William C. Temple, its chairman, took over the team payments becoming the first known individual club owner. However, in early days of professional football, the public wrongly viewed everyone who was playing for an athletic club as an amateur. So the date of Temple becoming the first owner is still in question, but it is estimated by historians to be between 1898 and 1901. Several histories have tabbed the 1898 season, when the team was suddenly confronted with more players under contract than they'd expected. While others argue for 1899, when several new stars were hired to keep the team on top. The NFL's official chronology states that in 1900 Temple took over the D.C. & A.C. payments. Temple, a local steel magnate, was also a part owner and president of the Pittsburgh Pirates.

== Move to Homestead ==
The Duquesnes had become the best pro team in Pennsylvania and, almost certainly, in the country. In 1900, A.C. Dinkey stole most of the Duquesne players, as well as Temple, for his Homestead Library & Athletic Club, an organization that had existed since 1894 in the Pittsburgh suburb of Homestead, Pennsylvania, offering them higher salaries. Like the Duquesnes, that team became a national powerhouse in football for the next two years. Meanwhile, Duquesne in 1900 found itself posting a financial loss, resulting in the club to fold its professional football team immediately.

== Season by season ==
Season	Won	Lost	Tied	Points for	Points against	Captain	Coach	Manager	Chairman
1895	4	3	1	92	86	Ed Young	Louis Vail	William C. Temple	J. B. Vandergrift
1896	6	3	1	112	44	Ed Young	none	Jim Wagenhurst	J. B. Vandergrift
1897	8	3	0	172	62	Ed Young	none	Ed Young, Jim Wagenhurst	Ed Young
1898	11	0	1	361	5	Roy Jackson	Roy Jackson	W. M. Greenwood	William C. Temple
1899	10	0	0	372	15	Roy Jackson	Roy Jackson	John A. Davidson	William Coates
1900	9	2	0	183	23	Roy Jackson	Roy Jackson	Roy Jackson	E. S. Fownes
