= Charlie Atherton =

American baseball and football player (1874–1935)

- Third baseman
- Born: November 19, 1874; New Brunswick, New Jersey, United States
- Died: December 17, 1935 (aged 61); Vienna, Austria
- Batted: Right Threw: Right

MLB debut
- May 30, 1899, for the Washington Senators

Last MLB appearance
- August 22, 1899, for the Washington Senators

MLB statistics
- Batting average: .248
- Home runs: 0
- Runs batted in: 23
- Stats at Baseball Reference

Teams
- Washington Senators (1899)

Charlie Atherton
Profile
- Position: End

Career information
- College: Penn State

Career history

Playing
- Greensburg Athletic Association (1895); Pittsburgh Athletic Club (1896); Greensburg Athletic Association (1897–1898)

Coaching
- Greensburg Athletic Association (HC) (1895)

Awards and highlights
- Coaching Record: 8–2–1; Invented Place kick for American Football

Charles Morgan Herbert Atherton (November 19, 1874 – December 17, 1935) was an American Major League Baseball third baseman. Nicknamed "Prexy", he batted and threw right-handed, was 5 ft 10 in (1.78 m) tall and weighed 160 pounds. He was an accomplished musician and writer, as well as an athlete.

== Early life ==
He was born in New Brunswick, New Jersey, the son of George W. Atherton and Frances “Fannie” Wright Darusmont Washburn, of Plympton, Massachusetts. His father, a Civil War veteran, at the time was a professor of political science at Rutgers University. In 1882, at the age of 9 he moved to Philadelphia when his father took over as president of Pennsylvania State University.

Atherton loved baseball as well as football. He was Penn State's first sports star as a member of the school's baseball and football teams. He is also credited with inventing the place kick.

== Sports career ==
He was an early professional football player and coach for the Greensburg Athletic Association. He also played professional football in 1896 for the Pittsburgh Athletic Club.

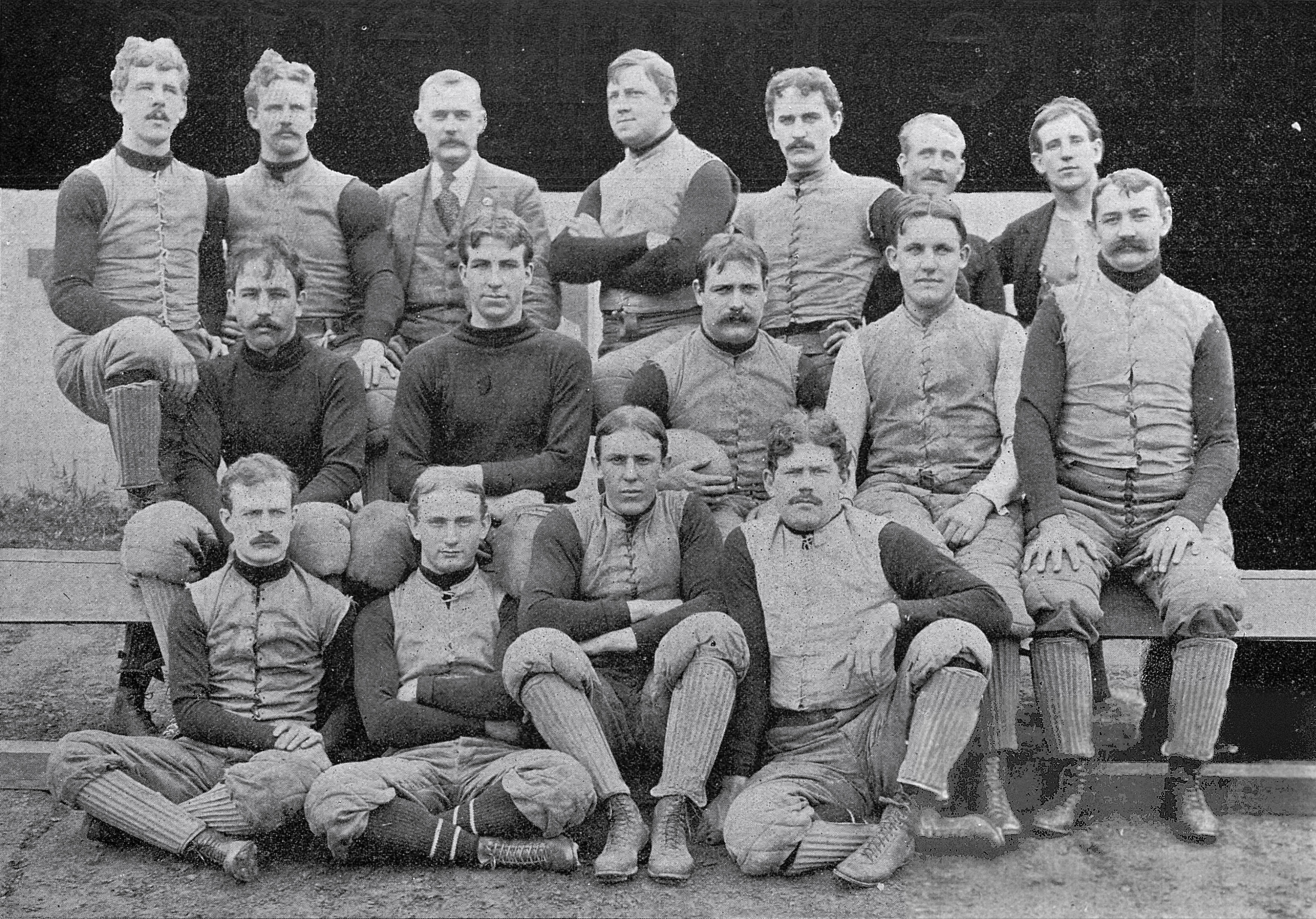
Atherton (back row, far left) with the Pittsburgh Athletic Club football team in 1896

He made his Major League debut on May 30, 1899 at the age of 24. He hit .248 in 242 at bats in 1899, which would end up being his only Major League season.

He also hit 5 doubles, 6 triples and had 23 RBI. Defensively, Atherton committed 26 errors, which was fourth worst on the now defunct Washington Senators team of the National League. He played his final game on August 22, 1899.

== Travels ==
He traveled to a Russia as part of the YMCA. He was based in Petrograd, hosted by the Czech Legion, who were aligned to the Russian Imperial Army. He witnessed the Russian Revolution, World War I.

He had become acquainted with Vincent Pisek of Malesov, an American Czech pastor who invited him to become the musical director of the Jan Hus Presbyterian Church in New York City. Atherton learned the Czech language and became a student of Czech and Slovak Folk Songs. He travelled to Vladivostok in 1919 to encourage the evacuation of the Czech Legion, who were stranded in Siberia in the aftermath of the First World War. Upon his return he published a book titled “Favorite songs of the Czech Slovak Army in Russia”. His elder brother, Frank Peabody Atherton was a Spanish–American War veteran and composer.

Atherton continued to live in New York City during the 1920s undertaking a role as a social worker for Czechs and Bohemians through his church. He continued to travel back and forth the Atlantic, between New York and Bremen, between 1928 on SS America and 1934 on SS Europa. He was very familiar with Central Europe and his books were published in Czech and included a collection of Czech and Slovak folk songs he had captured that were sung by soldiers during their time in Siberia. It was a time of political turmoil and he witnessed the Nazis rise to power first hand. He documented each event in highly descriptive letters to his sister, Harriet, who he called Hattie.

== Death ==
He died on December 17, 1935, at the age of 60 of tuberculosis. He was buried at Vienna Central Cemetery, in Austria on December 21, 1935.

== Legacy ==
Pennsylvania State University library holds an oral history interview with his sister Helen Atherton Govier from January 25, 1974.

== Ancestry ==
He is a direct descendant of James Atherton, one of the First Settlers of New England; who arrived in Dorchester, Massachusetts in the 1630s.

== Bibliography ==
- Kuntz, M.A. (2005). Charlie Atherton : son of Penn State. LCCN 2005909776.
