= Lawson Fiscus =

American football player (1866–1949)

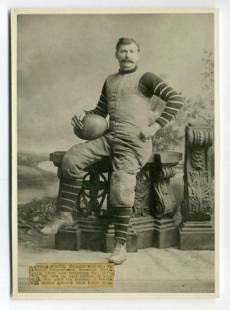

Profile
- Positions: Guard, Halfback

Personal information
- Born: June 28, 1866; Indiana, Pennsylvania, United States
- Died: August 31, 1949 (aged 83); Youngwood, Pennsylvania

Career information
- College: Princeton

Career history
- Allegheny Athletic Association (1891, 1893); Greensburg Athletic Association (1893–1900)

Awards and highlights
- Sixth ever paid professional football player; 1x W. Pennsylvania Circuit Champion (1897)

Irvin Lawson Fiscus (June 28, 1866 – August 31, 1949) was one of the first professional football players. He attended Princeton University, where his outstanding play at guard earned him the title Samson of Princeton, before going on to play professionally with the Allegheny Athletic Association in 1891 and the Greensburg Athletic Association in 1893. His brothers Ross and Newell also played for Pittsburgh-area athletic clubs and were highly regarded as players.

== Early life ==
Lawson was the son of a farmer and he grew up in Indiana County, Pennsylvania. He was just one of sixteen children. All of his brothers were athletic and largely built, however Lawson was considered the toughest of family.

== Football ==
=== Princeton ===
Lawson may have played some informal football at Indiana Normal School (now Indiana University of Pennsylvania) in the late 1880s. By 1891, he and Ross played well enough to receive "liberal expense money" to go to Pittsburgh and play for the Allegheny Athletic Association. In 1892, Lawson was recruited to play football at Princeton University. At the time, college football was considered more prestigious than professional football. While at Princeton, Fiscus played guard and excelled at the position. However, he dropped out of school and returned home after the 1892 season.

=== Professional football ===
In 1893, Lawson played for both the Allegheny Athletic Association and the Greensburg Athletic Association. Both clubs were thirty miles apart. While Allegheny used Fiscus on the line, Greensburg placed him at halfback. Lawson became a teacher in South Fork in 1894. However, Greensburg secretly offered him $20 a game to play with their Athletic Association. Fiscus quickly took the job, making Greensburg the third football team in three years to hire professionals. Greensburg then enjoyed their best season to date. Their only loss to a club from Altoona was avenged with a 6–4 victory at home on Thanksgiving Day. Other wins came over the Kiski Kiskiminetas, Indiana Normal, West Virginia University, the Carnegies of Braddock, Holy Ghost College (now Duquesne University), and the Jeannette Athletic Club.

==== The Jeannette incident ====
During the first half was of the Jeannette game Fiscus got into an altercation with an unknown Jeannette player. Several accounts of the incident describe Fiscus kicking the Jeannette player in the face. However, the Pittsburgh Press reported that he tripped the guy and "purposely tramped on his neck." Either way, Jeannette immediately petitioned the referee to expel Fiscus from the game, while Greensburg defended Fiscus's actions. The arguments continued through to the second half of the game. Finally, either Jeannette or Greensburg stormed off the field in protest, and the game was declared a scoreless draw.

=== 1896 ===
In 1896 Lawson and his brother Ross Fiscus played the halfback slots for Greensburg, while his other brother Newell became one of the team's tackles. The team accumulated a 5–0–0 at the end of October and had a final record of 6–1–1. This was Greensburg's best finish since the team began playing football in 1890. In 1897 Fiscus helped Greensburg win the "Western Pennsylvania football championship."

== After football ==
Fiscus continued to play football with Greensburg for the next several years. He was later involved in businesses throughout the years. Still later, he became a police chief in Youngwood, Pennsylvania. For the longest time sports historians were convinced that pro football had begun in 1895 when the Latrobe Athletic Association offered to pay John Brallier $10 to play against Jeannette. However just before his death in 1949, Fiscus announced he was paid $20 by Greensburg a year earlier and believed himself to have been the first pro football player. Today, Fiscus is the sixth player known to have been openly paid to play football. However, after looking at the list of the first several professional football players, Fiscus seemed to be unaware that some of his Allegheny Athletic Association teammates in 1893 had been salaried.
