= Ed Abbaticchio =

American baseball and football player (1877–1957)

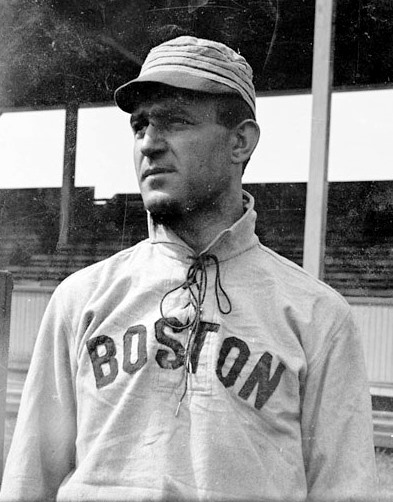
- Second baseman / Shortstop
- Born: April 15, 1877; Latrobe, Pennsylvania, U.S.
- Died: January 6, 1957 (aged 79); Ft. Lauderdale, Florida, U.S.
- Batted: Right Threw: Right

MLB debut
- September 4, 1897, for the Philadelphia Phillies

Last MLB appearance
- September 15, 1910, for the Boston Doves

MLB statistics
- Batting average: .254
- Home runs: 11
- Runs batted in: 324
- Stats at Baseball Reference

Teams
- Philadelphia Phillies (1897–1898); Boston Beaneaters (1903–1905); Pittsburgh Pirates (1907–1910); Boston Doves (1910)

Career highlights and awards
- World Series champion (1909)
Football career
Profile
Positions	Fullback, Kicker
Career information
College	None
Career history
1895–1900	Latrobe Athletic Association
Awards and highlights
All-Western Pennsylvania Team (1898)

Edward James Abbaticchio (April 15, 1877 – January 6, 1957) was the first Major League Baseball player and first professional football player of Italian ancestry, both chronologically and alphabetically.

== Baseball ==
Born in Latrobe, Pennsylvania, Abbatticchio was primarily a shortstop and second baseman, though he also saw playing time in the outfield and at third base. He began his baseball career with a semi-professional team from Greensburg, Pennsylvania in 1897. Shortly afterwards, he made his Major League debut, in the National League, on September 4, 1897, for the Philadelphia Phillies.

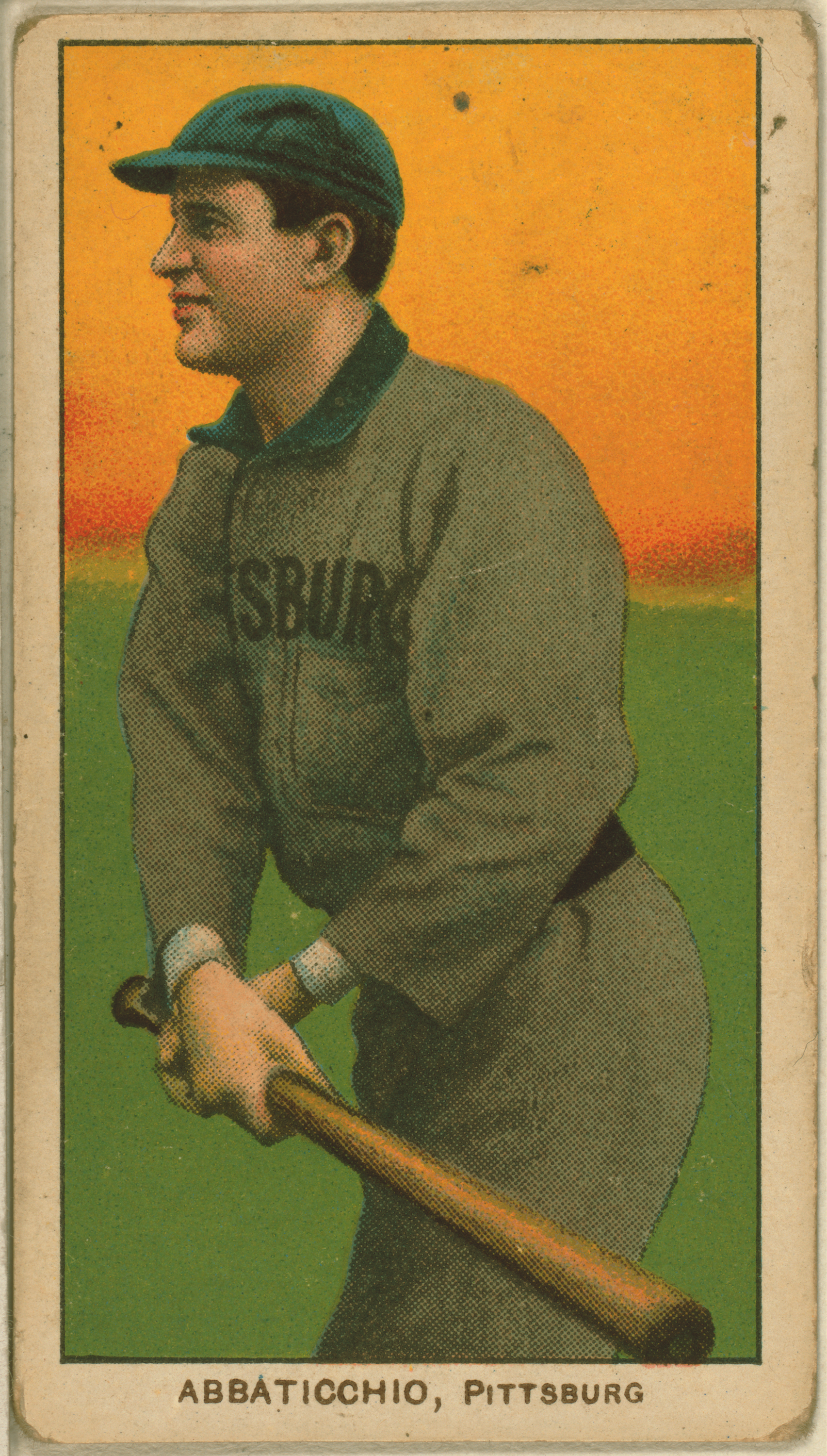

He played in three games for the Phillies that season and played another 25 for them in 1898. In 1899, he played in the Western League for the Minneapolis Millers and in 1900 in the American Association for the Millers and the Milwaukee Brewers. For the 1901 and 1902 seasons, Abbaticchio moved on to play with the Nashville Vols of the Southern Association. During those two seasons, he led the league in batting with averages of .360 and .367, respectively. For the next two years, he played once again in the National League for the Boston Beaneaters. He had initially decided to leave baseball in 1906, choosing instead to run a hotel in Latrobe.

A year later, the Pittsburgh Pirates convinced Abbaticchio to join them for their 1907 season. He then stayed with Pirates until the 1910 season, when he joined the Boston Doves. During his time in Pittsburgh, Ed played on the Pirates' 1909 World Series team. However, in the World Series he struck out in his only at-bat, as a pinch hitter. However, the season prior, on October 4, Ed hit a ball into the stands in game against the Chicago Cubs, which was called foul by umpire Hank O'Day, who also ruled on the infamous Merkle's Boner. The Pirates protested the call which would have been a possible home run or triple, and brought the tying run to the plate. Had the Pirates won the game, they would've also captured the 1908 National League pennant. The hit eventually evolved into an urban legend that had Abbaticchio's foul ball striking a woman in the stands, to where she required hospital care, and which resulted in her filing a lawsuit against the Cubs. The story of the lawsuit has since been debunked as fiction.

Abbaticchio was a good friend of Pirates great Honus Wagner. The two played alongside each other in the Pirate infield. Wagner once called Abbaticchio a "great second baseman with whom he had the honor to play with. " Wagner also went on to say that he was "an ever lasting credit to baseball, to Pittsburgh, and his home section of Latrobe." Statistically was an above-average fielder and base thief.

In 855 games over nine seasons, Abbaticchio posted a .254 batting average (772-for-3044) with 355 runs, 43 triples,11 home runs, 324 RBI, 142 stolen bases and 289 bases on balls. Defensively, he recorded an overall .931 fielding percentage.

== Football ==
Outside of baseball, Abbatticchio was also among the first wave of professional football players. He began his professional football career with the Latrobe Athletic Association in 1895 and was paid $50 a game for Latrobe. He starred as a fullback and kicker. In 1896, Abbatticchio kicked a 23-yard field goal to help give Latrobe a 5–0 win over the West Virginia Mountaineers. After their season ended, Abbatticchio and several Latrobe players such as John Brallier and Harry Ryan traveled to Punxsutawney, Pennsylvania and played for that town's local team against a team from DuBois. The game lasted only 12 minutes before a riot ended play with Punxsutawney leading, 12–0. In 1897, Abbatticchio reportedly kicked several field goals against the Pittsburgh Athletic Club, which resulted in a 47-0 Latrobe win, and the worst defeat in the Pittsburgh Athletic Club team's history. At the season's end, a Pittsburgh-base football expert picked an all-western Pennsylvania team from among the area's amateur, professional, and college teams. Abbatticchio and two other Latrobe players, tackle Harry Ryan and end Walter Okeson, were chosen to the team. On November 30, 1899, during a Thanksgiving Day game against Indiana Normal School (today Indiana University of Pennsylvania), Abbaticchio was noted for his runs in a 35-0 Latrobe win. In 1900, in a two-game series against the Greensburg Athletic Association, he was credited for a 23-yard game-winning field goal kick in the first game. Meanwhile, in the second game, Abbatticchio kicked 12-yard field goal, scored a touchdown, and kicked a goal after, in an 11-0 Latrobe win.

He is credited by Fielding H. Yost with developing the first spiral punt, enabling the ball to travel farther.

He died in Fort Lauderdale, Florida in 1957.
