= 1898 Latrobe Athletic Association season =

American football team season

1898 Latrobe Athletic Association football
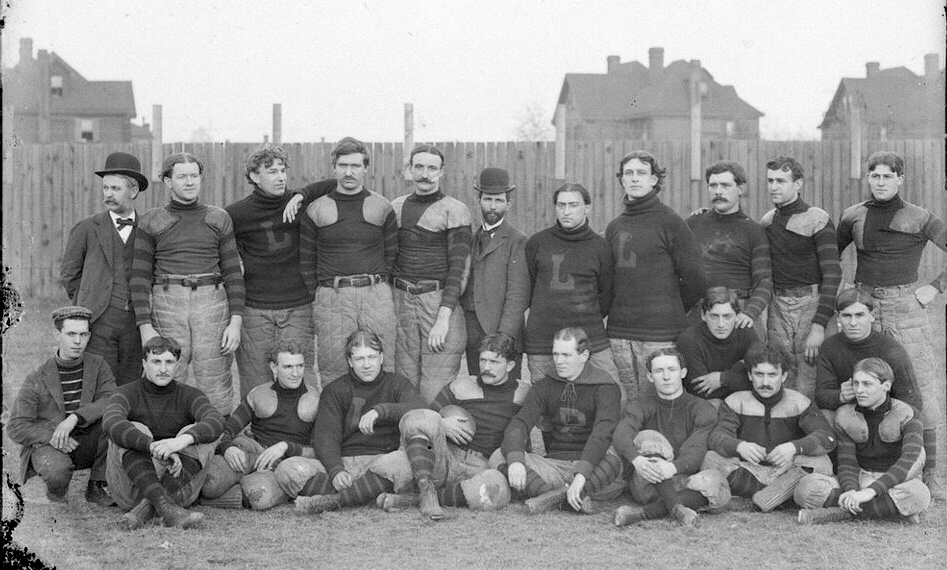
- Record: 7–3
- Manager: Dave Berry
- Head coach: Alfred E. Bull
- Captain: Harry Ryan

The 1898 Latrobe Athletic Association season was their fourth season in existence. The team finished 7–3. The team's colors this season were red and blue.

== Schedule ==
Game	Date	Opponent	Result	Source
1	October 1	Jeannette Indians	W 51–0	
2	October 8	McKees Rocks Indians	W 18–0	
3	October 12	at Pittsburgh College	W 17–0	
4	October 15	Pittsburgh Cottage Club	W 50–0	
5	October 22	at Greensburg Athletic Association	W 6–0	
6	November 5	Greensburg Athletic Association	W 6–5	
7	November 8	Pittsburgh College	W 20–6	
8	November 19	at Duquesne Country and Athletic Club	L 0–17	
9	November 24	at Pittsburgh Athletic Club	L 0–6	
10	November 30	Greensburg Athletic Association	L 0–6	
