= 1895 Latrobe Athletic Association season =

American football team season

1895 Latrobe Athletic Association football
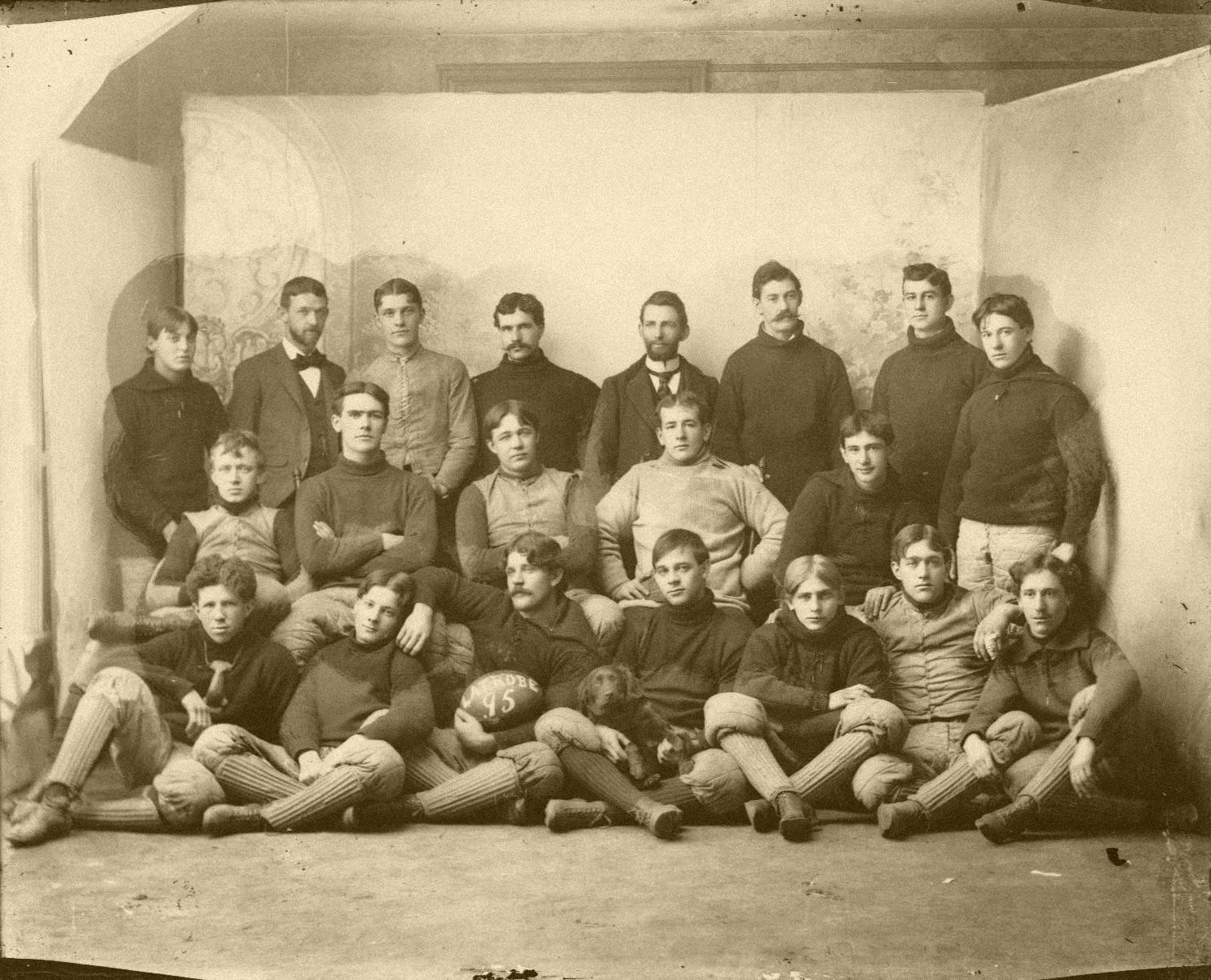
- Record: 8–4
- Manager: Dave Berry
- Head coach: Russ Aukerman (early season)
- Captain: Russ Aukerman (early season); Harry Ryan (late season)
- Home field: YMCA grounds

The 1895 Latrobe Athletic Association season was their first season in existence. This season John Brallier became the first openly professional football player. The team was sponsored by the local YMCA and managed by Dave Berry. Halfback Russell Aukerman served as coach and captain until leaving the team partway through the season. Lineman Harry Ryan finished the season as captain.

== Schedule ==
Game	Date	Opponent	Result	Source
1	September 3	Jeannette Athletic Club (Note: John Brallier's first game. Paid $10 by Latrobe manager Dave Berry to play.)	W 12–0	
2	September 14	at Altoona Athletic Association	L 0–18	
3	September 21	Mt. Pleasant, Pennsylvania	W 14–4	
4	September 28	Kiskiminetas	W 4–0	
5	October 5	at Greensburg Athletic Association	L 0–25	
6	October 19	vs. West Virginia Mountaineers	L 0–10	
7	November 2	Morrellville	W 36–0	
8	November 9	Indiana Normal School	W 22–0	
9	November 16	Johnstown	W 36–0	
10	November 23	Jeannette Athletic Club	W 16–0	
11	November 28	at Indiana Normal School (Note: Brallier played for Indiana in this game.)	L 0–24	
12	November 30	Greensburg Athletic Association	W 4–0	
