= 1897 Pittsburgh Athletic Club football season =

American football team season

1897 Pittsburgh Athletic Club football
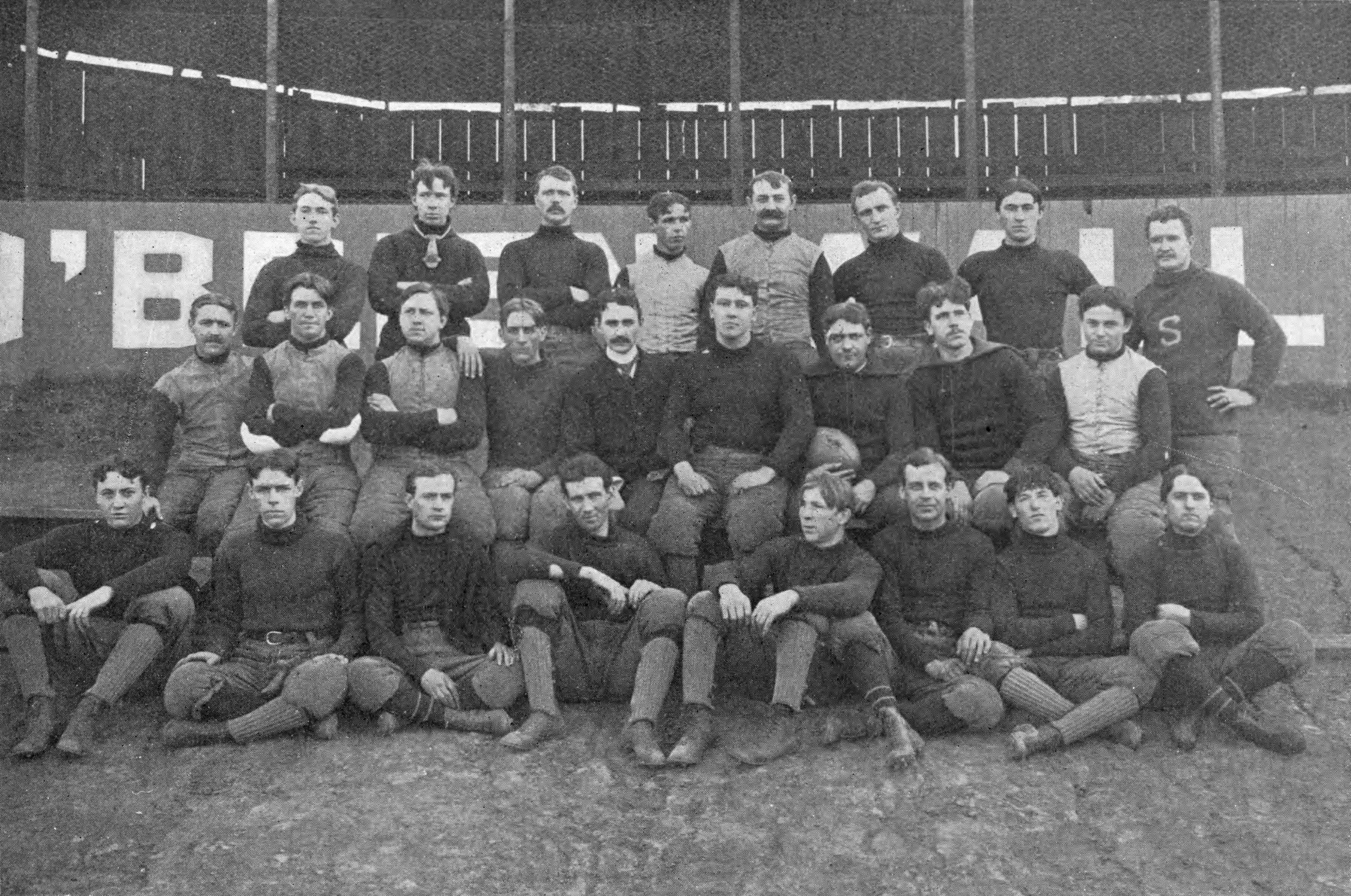
- Record: 5–5
- Manager: R. E. Hamilton; W. H. Hastings (late season)
- Head coach: George Hoskins
- Captain: George W. Ritchey; James P. Brownlee (late season)
- Home field: PAC Park

The Pittsburgh Athletic Club played its eighth season of American football in 1897. The team shut out its first five opponents and was shut out by its remaining five to finish with a 5–5 record. It played its home games at PAC Park at the corner of Larimer Avenue and Shetland Street in Pittsburgh.

== Season summary ==
Despite being one of the first football teams to employ professional players, the Pittsburgh Athletic Club (PAC) team, under new manager Robert E. Hamilton, began the 1897 season intending to maintain a purely amateur status. George W. Hoskins returned as coach and halfback/tackle George Ritchey was re-elected captain.

The PAC compiled a perfect record through the first half of its schedule, winning five games against weak-to-middling opponents without allowing a point.

The team's fortunes then reversed, starting with shutout losses to Washington & Jefferson College and local rival Duquesne Country & Athletic Club.

The low point of the season came when the PAC visited Latrobe, which that year made history as the first all-professional football team to play a full season. Playing its third hard game in only eight days, the beat-up and worn-out PAC lost 47–0. This worst defeat in the team's then eight-year history was followed by the resignation of manager Bob Hamilton and the appointment of William H. Hastings in his place.

Manager Hastings brought in new players to strengthen the squad in preparation for its November 20 rematch with the Duquesne Country and Athletic Club. End John Van Cleve, whom Hamilton had earlier kept off the team for being a professional, was added to the roster along with halfbacks Jake Camp and Dick Ely. Also joining the East Enders were linemen Archibald Stevenson of the Chicago Athletic Association and Bill Inglis of Washington & Jefferson. The night before the game, fullback James P. Brownlee was elected captain in place of Ritchey, who was "deposed" from the role for an apparent lack of dedication. These changes did not bring success against the Duquesnes, who had been strengthening their team as well and shut out the PAC by a larger margin than before.

A 16–0 loss to Greensburg completed a disastrous second half of the season in which the PAC failed to score any points. The Pittsburg[h] Press reported that amateurism had been abandoned by the football programs of both major Pittsburgh clubs, the PAC and Duquesne C&AC, and was unlikely to return if the teams expected to keep in the front ranks of the sport. The city, according to the paper, could not afford to yield football supremacy to smaller-town clubs such as Latrobe and Greensburg, which made no pretense of being amateur.

== Schedule ==
Date	Opponent	Site	Result	Attendance	Source
September 25	Emerald Athletic Club	PAC Park; Pittsburgh, PA	W 22–0	300	
October 2	Imperial Athletic Club	PAC Park; Pittsburgh, PA	W 54–0		
October 9	West Virginia	PAC Park; Pittsburgh, PA	W 6–0		
October 16	Grove City	PAC Park; Pittsburgh, PA	W 20–0		
October 23	Wheeling Tigers	PAC Park; Pittsburgh, PA	W 14–0	1,500	
October 30	Washington & Jefferson	PAC Park; Pittsburgh, PA	L 0–18	4,000–5,500	
November 2	at Duquesne Country and Athletic Club	Exposition Park; Allegheny, PA	L 0–4	3,500	
November 6	at Latrobe Athletic Association	Latrobe, PA	L 0–47	1,200	
November 20	Duquesne Country and Athletic Club	PAC Park; Pittsburgh, PA	L 0–10	4,000–6,000	
November 25	Greensburg Athletic Association	PAC Park; Pittsburgh, PA	L 0–16	2,000–3,000	
