= 1897 Latrobe Athletic Association season =

American football team season

1897 Latrobe Athletic Association football
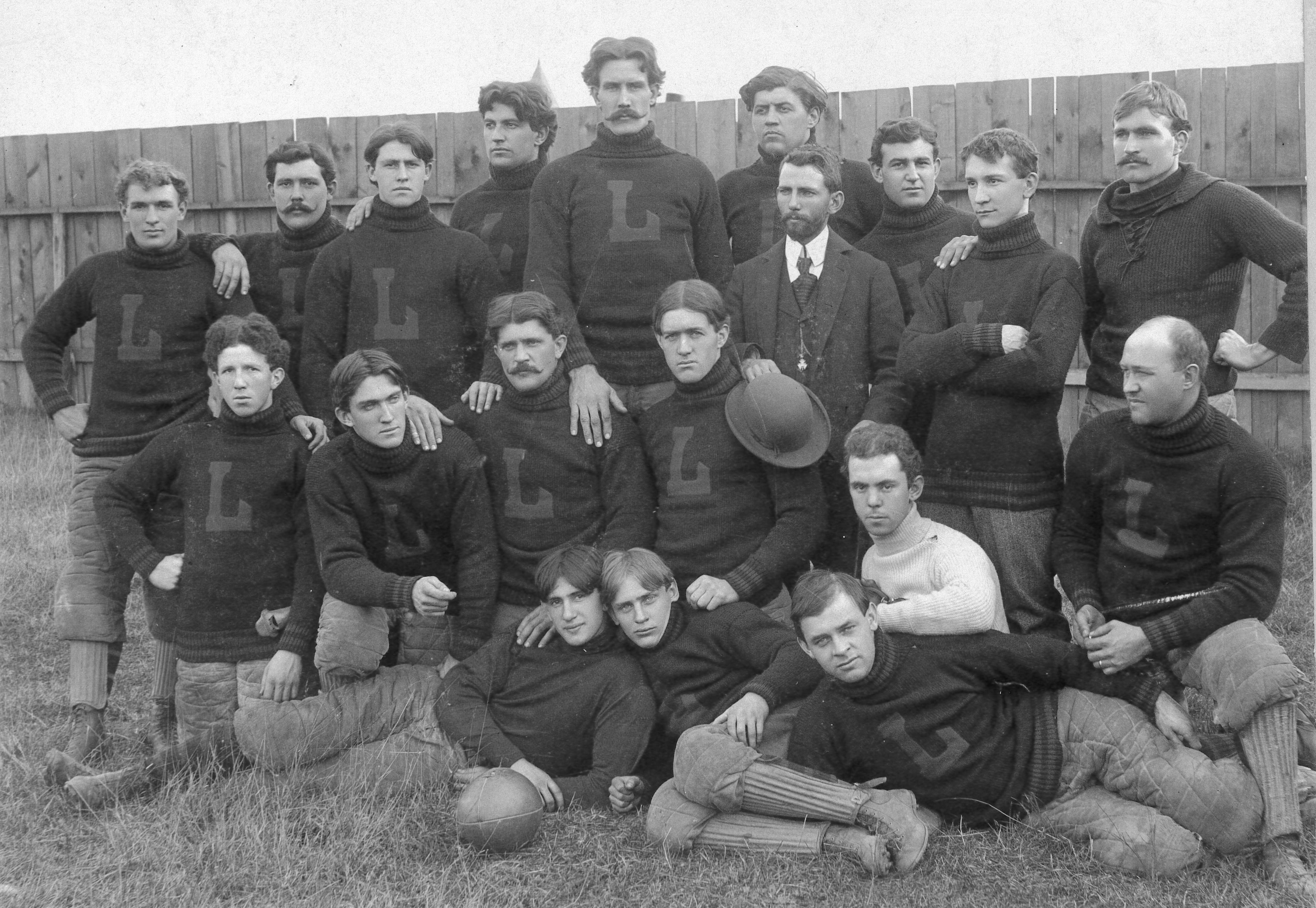
- Record: 10–2–1
- Manager: Dave Berry
- Head coach: Walter Okeson
- Captain: Harry Ryan

The 1897 Latrobe Athletic Association season was their third season in existence. The team finished 10–2–1. This season, Latrobe became the first team to be made entirely of professional players and play an entire season together.

== Schedule ==
Game	Date	Opponent	Result	Source
1	September 25	Jeannette Indians	W 28–0	
2	October 2	Pittsburgh Emeralds	W 58–0	
3	October 9	at Altoona Athletic Association	T 0–0	
4	October 13	Pittsburgh College	W 22–0	
5	October 16	Altoona Athletic Association	W 36–0	
6	October 23	at Mahoning Cycle Club	W 14–4	
7	October 27	Western University of Pennsylvania	W 30–0	
8	October 30	at Duquesne Country and Athletic Club	L 6–12	
9	November 6	Pittsburgh Athletic Club	W 47–0	
10	November 13	Mahoning Cycle Club	W 19–0	
11	November 20	at Greensburg Athletic Association	W 12–6	
12	November 25	West Virginia Mountaineers	W 16–0	
13	November 27	Greensburg Athletic Association	L 0–6	
