= Paul Blair (American football, born 1882) =

American football player (1882–1904)

Personal information
- Born: May 30, 1882; Latrobe, Pennsylvania
- Died: December 11, 1904 (aged 22); Latrobe, Pennsylvania

Career history
- Latrobe Athletic Association (1904)

Paul Blair (May 30, 1882 – December 11, 1904) was an American professional football player for the Latrobe Athletic Association in 1904. He was also the brother of Latrobe player, Eddie Blair. After the 1904 season, Blair was killed when he was hit by train walking along the Pennsylvania Railroad line between Latrobe, Pennsylvania and nearby Derry. The train's crew then loaded Blair's body on the train. Paul's father, John Blair, who was a railroad employee, recognized the shoe on the body that was just struck by the train, as being his son's. Latrobe players Harry Ryan and John Brallier served as pallbearers at the funeral.

The Latrobe football team also reportedly sent a floral wreath, standing on a pillar, to the Blair home. It stood almost five feet high. In the wreath were the words "Latrobe Football Team, 1904," while the words were intertwined with the colors of the team.
