= Eddie Blair =

American football player, coach, and physician (1871–1913)

Profile
- Position: Back

Personal information
- Born: August 5, 1871; Latrobe, Pennsylvania, U.S.
- Died: March 8, 1913 (aged 41); Philadelphia, Pennsylvania, U.S.

Career information
- College: Penn, Saint Vincent College

Career history
- Latrobe Athletic Association (1895–1897)

James Edward Blair (August 5, 1871 – March 8, 1913) was an American football player and coach and physician. He was early professional football player with the Latrobe Athletic Association. He later relocated to Burlington, New Jersey where he took a prominent part in the city council for a time and was a surgeon for the Third Battalion of the New Jersey National Guard. He was a charter member of the Burlington Elks Lodge and was a thirty-second degree Mason. He also was affiliated with the Sons of Veterans.

== Football ==
Blair began his career with the Latrobe A. A. in 1895 as an amateur player. However, his major claim to fame came when a scheduling conflict led to his being replaced by John Brallier, who became the first openly professional football player.

In 1895 Blair found himself in a scheduling conflict. Edward, who also played baseball in nearby Greensburg, discovered it that the team's first football game against the Jeannette Athletic Association conflicted with a prior baseball commitment. Latrobe manager David Berry, who was now seeking a replacement for Blair, had heard of Brallier's performance as the Indiana Normal quarterback and signed him to play in the game for $10 plus expenses.

Blair served as the head football coach at Sewanee: The University of the South in 1896.

== College ==
Blair attended Saint Vincent College, located in Latrobe. He graduated from that school in 1892. Afterwards he attended the University of Pennsylvania where he played college football and college baseball. During his time at Penn, Blair played halfback on the football team and was a three year varsity player on the baseball team.

== Family and death ==
Blair was born in 1871 to Mr. and Mrs. John C. Blair, both of whom outlived him. He had two brothers, both of whom he outlived: Charles Richard Blair and Paul Blair, who also played on the Latrobe team. Blair died from a heart ailment, on March 8, 1913, at Medico-Chi Hospital in Philadelphia. He had a wife and a son, who was seven at the time of his death.

== Head coaching record ==
Year	Team	Overall	Conference	Standing	Bowl/playoffs
Sewanee Tigers (Southern Intercollegiate Athletic Association) (1896)
1896	Sewanee	3–3	3–3	T–5th	
Sewanee:		3–3	3–3		
Total:		3–3			
