= 1898 Greensburg Athletic Association season =

American football team season

1898 Greensburg Athletic Association football
- Record: 6–2–2
- Manager: J. E. Mitinger
- Head coach: George Barclay
- Captain: Joe Donohoe
- Home field: Athletic Park

The 1898 Greensburg Athletic Association season was their ninth season in existence. The team finished 6–2–2. The team was managed by J. E. Mitinger, coached by George Barclay (who also played halfback) and captained by Joe Donohoe (who played end).

== Schedule ==
Game	Date	Opponent	Result
1	October 8	Jeannette Athletic Club	W 49–0
2	October 15	New Castle Terrors	W 47–0
3	October 22	Latrobe Athletic Association	L 0–6
4	October 30	at Wheeling Tigers	W 10–0
5	November 2	Pittsburgh College	W 11–0
6	November 5	at Latrobe Athletic Association	L 5–6
7	November 12	at Duquesne Country and Athletic Club	T 0–0
8	November 19	at Pittsburgh Athletic Club	T 0–0
9	November 24	Grove City	W 35–0
10	November 30	at Latrobe Athletic Association	W 6–0

== Notes and references ==
- Van Atta, Robert (1983). "The History of Pro Football At Greensburg, Pennsylvania (1894-1900)" (PDF). Coffin Corner (Annual). Professional Football Researchers Association: 1–14. Archived from the original (PDF) on November 27, 2010.
- Van Atta, Robert (1980). "Latrobe, PA: Cradle of Pro Football" (PDF). Coffin Corner. 2 (Annual). Professional Football Researchers Association: 1–21. Archived from the original (PDF) on March 26, 2009.
