= 1896 Duquesne Country and Athletic Club season =

American football team season

1896 Duquesne Country and Athletic Club football
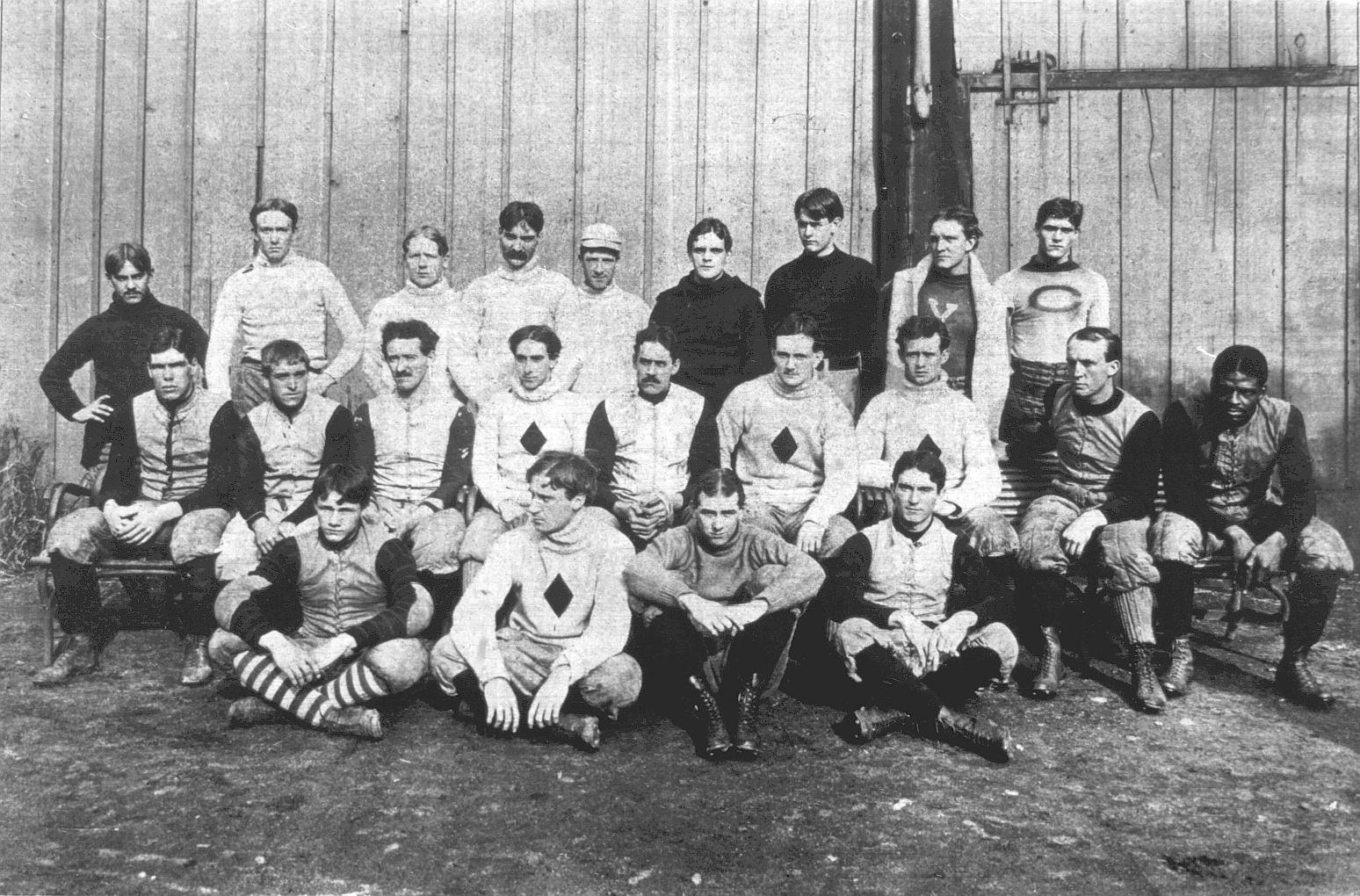
- Record: 6–3–1
- Manager: Jim Wagenhurst
- Captain: Ed Young (2nd year)
- Home field: Exposition Park

The Duquesne Country and Athletic Club (DC&AC) of Pittsburgh, Pennsylvania played its second season of American football in 1896. The team finished with a record of 6–3–1.

== Season summary ==
The team suffered a heavy turnover in personnel from its previous season, with only five players returning. It spent much of its early season trying to settle on a stable lineup.

On November 10, the DC&AC became the first team ever to face a fully professional football team. The opponent was the Allegheny Athletic Association, whose players were each to be paid $100 per game. The Duquesnes lost the game 12–0 at Exposition Park. The "Three A's" would cease to exist after shutting out the Pittsburgh Athletic Club a day later.

Victories against the Pittsburgh Athletic Club and Greensburg gave the DC&AC a claim as the best of the "big four" Western Pennsylvania athletic clubs (which also included Latrobe). The DC&AC however could not match the success of the region's top collegiate team—the undefeated, unscored-upon Washington & Jefferson—to whom they lost 4–0 on Thanksgiving Day.

== Schedule ==
Date	Opponent	Site	Result	Attendance	Source
October 3	Carlisle	Exposition Park; Allegheny, PA	L 0–18	2,000	
October 10	Pittsburgh College	Exposition Park; Allegheny, PA	W 24–0	1,000	
October 17	Emerald Athletic Club	Exposition Park; Allegheny, PA	W 26–0	≤ 300	
October 24	Western University of Pennsylvania	Exposition Park; Allegheny, PA	W 26–0	1,000	
November 3	at Pittsburgh Athletic Club	P.A.C. Park; Pittsburgh, PA	W 12–6	4,000–5,000	
November 7	West Virginia	Exposition Park; Allegheny, PA	T 0–0	1,000–2,000+	
November 10	Allegheny Athletic Association	Exposition Park; Allegheny, PA	L 0–12	2,000–4,000+	
November 14	Greensburg Athletic Association	Exposition Park; Allegheny, PA	W 18–4	2,000–3,000	
November 21	West Virginia	Exposition Park; Allegheny, PA	W 6–0	1,000–2,500	
November 26	Washington & Jefferson	Exposition Park; Allegheny, PA	L 0–4	10,000–12,000	
