= 1900 Duquesne Country and Athletic Club season =

American football team season

1900 Duquesne Country and Athletic Club football
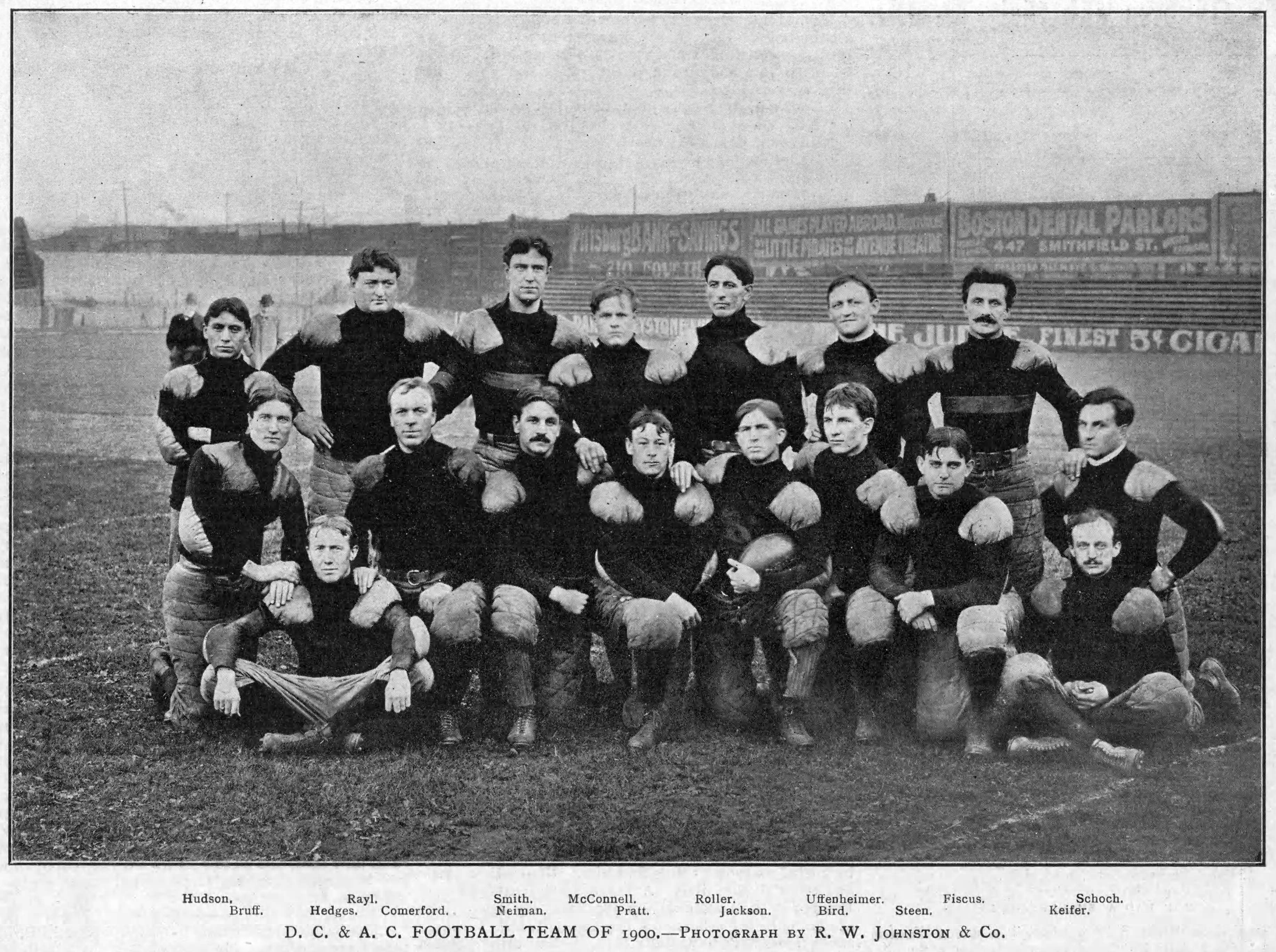
- Record: 9–2
- Chairman: E. S. Fownes
- Manager: Roy Jackson
- Head coach: Roy Jackson (3rd year)
- Captain: Roy Jackson (3rd year)
- Home field: Exposition Park

The Duquesne Country and Athletic Club (DC&AC) played its sixth and final season of American football in 1900. Led by coach, captain, and manager Roy Jackson, the team compiled a 9–2 record and outscored its opponents by a total of 183–23.

== Season summary ==
The team was unable to keep its roster intact from its dominant previous season as several players, including star backs J. A. Gammons and Dave Fultz, were lured by higher salaries to the Homestead Library & Athletic Club. Nevertheless, the DC&AC found sufficient replacements to remain strong.

The DC&AC and other athletic clubs in the Pittsburgh area were plagued throughout the season by bad weather, which suppressed attendance and caused financial losses. The DC&AC did not recover to play another season.

== Schedule ==
| Date | Opponent | Site | Result | Attendance | Source |
|---|---|---|---|---|---|
| October 6 | at East End Athletic Association | Old PAC Park; Pittsburgh, PA | W 23–6 | 1,000 | |
| October 9 | Western University of Pennsylvania | Exposition Park; Allegheny City, PA | W 5–0 | 400 | |
| October 13 | at Latrobe Athletic Association | Latrobe, PA | W 12–0 | 2,000 | |
| October 20 | Bucknell | Exposition Park; Allegheny City, PA | W 29–0 | 1,000–2,500 | |
| October 27 | Penn State | Exposition Park; Allegheny City, PA | W 29–0 | 1,500 | |
| October 31 | Greensburg Athletic Association | Exposition Park; Allegheny City, PA | W 24–0 | 1,800 | |
| November 3 | Ohio Medical | Exposition Park; Allegheny City, PA | W 28–0 | | |
| November 6 | Homestead Library & Athletic Club | Exposition Park; Allegheny City, PA | L 0–10 | 9,000 | |
| November 10 | Latrobe Athletic Association | Exposition Park; Allegheny City, PA | L 0–5 | 1,200 | |
| November 17 | East End Athletic Association | Exposition Park; Allegheny City, PA | W 23–0 | 600 | |
| December 1 | Washington & Jefferson | Exposition Park; Allegheny City, PA | W 10–2 | 3,000–4,000 | |
