= 1899 Latrobe Athletic Association season =

American football team season

1899 Latrobe Athletic Association football
- Record: 4–0
- Manager: Dave Berry

The 1899 Latrobe Athletic Association season was their fifth season in existence. The team played only four games this season and finished 4–0.

== Schedule ==
Game	Date	Opponent	Result	Source
1	November 11	Duquesne Athletic Club (Note: The Duquesne Athletic Club of Duquesne, Pennsylvania was unrelated to the better known and similarly named Duquesne Country and Athletic Club of Pittsburgh.)	W 12–0	
2	November 18	Mt. Pleasant	W 46–0	(Note: Another source gives the combined score of the second and third games (vs. "unknown opponents") as 57–2.)
3	November 25	Verona	W 10–0	
4	November 30	Indiana Normal School (Note: Thanksgiving Day game)	W 35–0	
