= 1896 Latrobe Athletic Association season =

American football team season

1896 Latrobe Athletic Association football
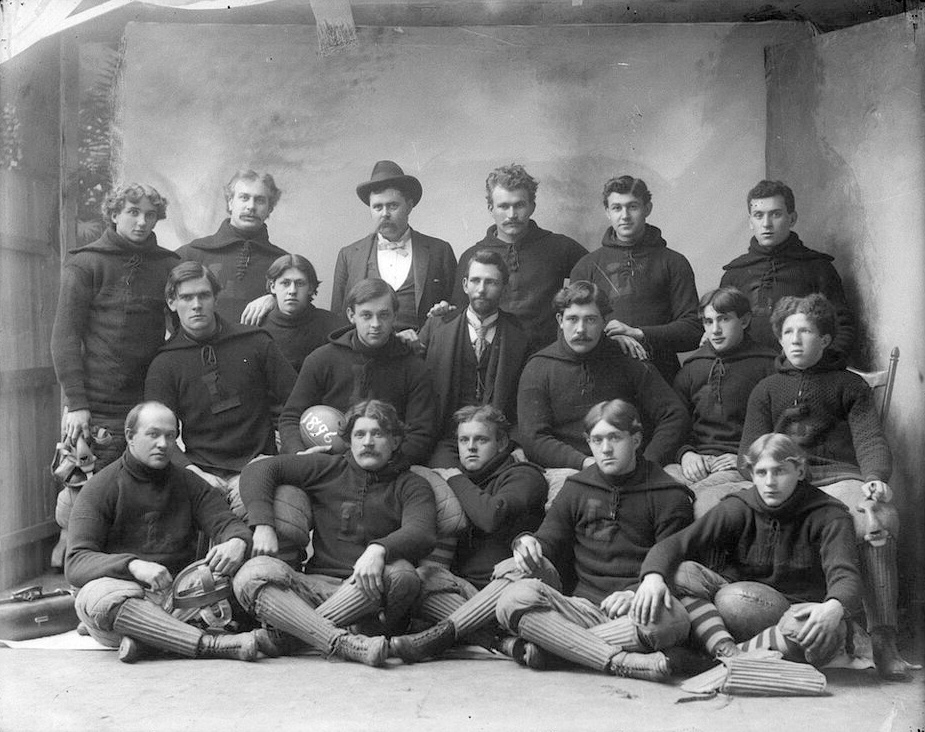
- Record: 7–4
- Manager: Dave Berry
- Captain: Walter Howard

The 1896 Latrobe Athletic Association season was their second season in existence. The team finished 7–4.

== Schedule ==
Game	Date	Opponent	Result
1	September 19	Pittsburgh Imperials	W 54–6
2	September 26	Jeannette Indians	W 80–0
3	October 3	Altoona Athletic Association	W 12–0
4	October 10	Western University of Pennsylvania	W 4–0
5	October 24	Indiana Normal School	W 38–0
6	October 31	Greensburg Athletic Association	L 4–10
7	November 13	West Virginia Mountaineers	W 5–0
8	November 14	West Virginia Mountaineers	L 0–4
9	November 21	Indiana Normal School	W 29–0
10	November 26	at Greensburg Athletic Association (Note: Thanksgiving Day game)	L 0–10
11	December 5	at Altoona Athletic Association	L 6–12
