= 1896 Greensburg Athletic Association season =

American football team season

1896 Greensburg Athletic Association football
- Record: 6–1–1
- Manager: J. E. Mitinger
- Head coach: Alfred Sigman
- Captain: Alfred Sigman
- Home field: Athletic Park

The 1896 Greensburg Athletic Association season was their seventh season in existence. The team finished 6–1–1. Alfred Sigman from Lafayette College was added as Greensburg's captain and coach and also played fullback.

== Schedule ==
| Game | Date | Opponent | Result |
|---|---|---|---|
| 1 | September 6 | Jeannette Athletic Club | W 22–0 |
| 2 | October 3 | Wheeling Tigers | W 14–0 |
| 3 | October 10 | Beaver Falls, Pennsylvania | W 18–0 |
| 4 | October 17 | Pittsburgh Athletic Club | W 14–0 |
| 5 | October 24 | Geneva | Cancelled |
| 6 | October 31 | Latrobe Athletic Association | W 10–4 |
| 7 | November 14 | at Duquesne Country and Athletic Club | L 4–18 |
| 8 | November 21 | at Pittsburgh Athletic Club | T 0–0 |
| 10 | November 26 | Latrobe Athletic Association | W 10–0 |

== Notes and references ==
- Van Atta, Robert (1980). "Latrobe, PA: Cradle of Pro Football" (PDF). Coffin Corner. 2 (Annual). Professional Football Researchers Association: 1–21. Archived from the original (PDF) on March 26, 2009.
