= Charles Barney =

Charles Barney may refer to:

- Charles D. Barney (1844–1945), American stockbroker
- Charles T. Barney (1851–1907), President of the Knickerbocker Trust Company
- Charles L. Barney (1874–1913), American football player and strongman
- Charles Neal Barney (1875–1949), Massachusetts politician

== See also ==
- Charles Barney Hicks (died 1902), blackface minstrel performers
