= 1907 Latrobe Athletic Association season =

American football team season

1907 Latrobe Athletic Association football
- Record: 5–2–2 or 5–3–2
- Manager: John Brallier
- Head coach: Harry Ryan; John Brallier
- Captain: Leo Gibson
- Home field: Latrobe Steel Athletic Grounds

The 1907 Latrobe Athletic Association season was their twelfth season in existence. The decrease in community interest and the change of the team from the professional ranks to a local amateur status in 1907 coincided with John Brallier's last year as a player. The team finished 5–3–2 or 5–2–2 (Note: The Latrobe Bulletin reported that the season ended after the November 28 (Thanksgiving) game vs. Sterling, and dismissed the November 30 game vs. Lyceum as having been played by a "patched up conglomeration [of Latrobe and Sterling AC players] styling itself as the Latrobe team". Yearly game results compiled by Robert B. Van Atta do not include the Lyceum game.) in 1907.

== Leadership ==
Prior to the start of the season, Latrobe's veteran captain Harry Ryan retired as a player and took on the role of co-head coach with John Brallier, who also held the position of manager. Leo Gibson succeeded Ryan as captain. It was arranged that Brallier would handle coaching duties every third week or when Ryan was working the night shift at the steel plant.

== Schedule ==
Game	Date	Opponent	Result	Source
1	October 12	Altoona Athletic Club (Note: Game was billed as being against the Altoona Athletic Club, but was really against the Altoona Area High School football team.)	W 22–0	
2	October 19	Steelton	L 0–6	
3	October 26	Ellwood City	W 28–0	
4	November 2	at Steelton	L 0–12	
5	November 5	California (PA) YMCA	W 38–0	
6	November 9	Wilkinsburg Sterling Athletic Club	T 0–0	
7	November 16	at South Fork	T 0–0	
8	November 23	South Fork	W 16–0	
9	November 28	Wilkinsburg Sterling Athletic Club	W 6–2	
10	November 30	at Pittsburgh Lyceum	L 0–33	
