= 1906 Latrobe Athletic Association season =

American football team season

1906 Latrobe Athletic Association football
- Record: 3–1
- Manager: John Brallier
- Head coach: John Brallier
- Captain: Harry Ryan
- Home field: Latrobe Steel Athletic Grounds

The 1906 Latrobe Athletic Association season was their eleventh season in existence. Led by head coach and manager John Brallier and captain Harry Ryan, the team finished 3–1.

Latrobe's Thanksgiving loss against Canton (the team that would become the Canton Bulldogs of the National Football League in 1920) was the first Latrobe loss since 1901 and its first points allowed since 1903. The game may have motivated the Canton Bulldogs-Massillon Tigers betting scandal.

== Schedule ==
Game	Date	Opponent	Result	Source
1	October 20	Turtle Creek	W 38–0	
2	November 10	Wilkinsburg Sterling Athletic Club	W 27–0	
3	November 24	Braddock	W 45–0	
4	November 29	at Canton Bulldogs	L 0–16	
