= 1897 Greensburg Athletic Association season =

American football team season

1897 Greensburg Athletic Association football
- Record: 10–1
- Manager: J. E. Mitinger
- Head coach: George Barclay
- Captain: Joe Donohoe
- Home field: Athletic Park

The 1897 Greensburg Athletic Association season was their eighth season in existence. The team finished 10–1.

== Schedule ==
| Game | Date | Opponent | Result |
|---|---|---|---|
| 1 | September 25 | Swissvale Athletic Club | W 22–6 |
| 2 | October 2 | Jeannette Athletic Club | W 74–0 or 76–0 |
| 3 | October 9 | Pittsburgh Imperials | W 90–0 |
| 4 | October 16 | Geneva | W 34–0 or 32–0 |
| 5 | October 24 | Altoona Athletic Club | W 28–0 |
| 6 | October 30 | Wheeling Tigers | W 30–0 |
| 7 | November 3 | Western University of Pennsylvania | W 47–0 |
| 8 | November 6 | at Duquesne Country and Athletic Club | W 24–6 |
| 9 | November 20 | Latrobe Athletic Association | L 6–12 |
| 10 | November 24 | Pittsburgh Athletic Club | W 16–0 |
| 11 | November 26 | at Latrobe Athletic Association | W 6–0 |

== Notes and references ==
- Van Atta, Robert (1980). "Latrobe, PA: Cradle of Pro Football" (PDF). Coffin Corner. 2 (Annual). Professional Football Researchers Association: 1–21. Archived from the original (PDF) on March 26, 2009.
