= 1900 Latrobe Athletic Association season =

American football team season

1900 Latrobe Athletic Association football
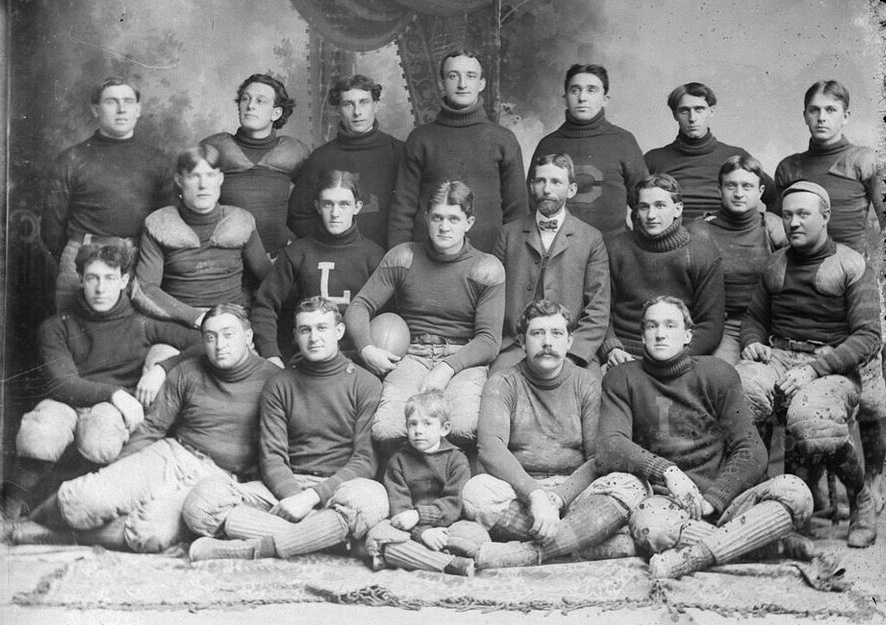
- Record: 6–3
- Manager: Dave Berry
- Head coach: Russell Knight; A. R. Kennedy
- Captain: Harry Ryan

The 1900 Latrobe Athletic Association season was their sixth season in existence. The team finished 6–3.

== Schedule ==
Game	Date	Opponent	Result
1	September 29	Pittsburgh (Note: This was the former Lalus club, which merged into the East End Athletic Association later in the season.)	W 11–0
2	October 6	Indiana Normal School	W 52–0
3	October 13	Duquesne Country and Athletic Club	L 0–12
4	October 20	Scottdale	W 35–0 (Note: While listed as a 35–0 Latrobe win in final season results, the game vs. Scottdale was described in a Pittsburg[h] Post game report as "merely one for practice" with no precise score kept.)
5	October 27	Greensburg Athletic Association	W 6–0
6	November 3	Homestead Library and Athletic Club	L 0–11
7	November 10	Duquesne Country and Athletic Club	W 5–0
8	November 17	Greensburg Athletic Association	W 11–0
9	November 29	Homestead Library and Athletic Club (Note: Thanksgiving Day game) (Note: A third Latrobe-Greensburg game was scheduled for Thanksgiving Day. However Latrobe manager Dave Berry preferred to play undefeated Homestead team instead. He was forced to pay Greensburg $400 for cancelling the third meeting.)	L 0–12
