= Russell Aukerman =

Profile
- Position: Halfback

Personal information
- Born: August 11, 1873; Altoona, Pennsylvania, U.S.
- Died: January 8, 1960 (aged 86); Takoma Park, Maryland, U.S.

Career information
- College: Gettysburg

Career history

Playing
- 1895: Latrobe Athletic Association
- 1895: Duquesne Country and Athletic Club

Coaching
- 1895: Latrobe Athletic Association

Awards and highlights
- Head coaching record (8–4–0); Gettysburg Hall of Athletic Honor (1990)

Albert Russell Aukerman (August 11, 1873 – January 8, 1960) was an early professional football player-coach for the Latrobe Athletic Association. Prior to that, he was a halfback at Gettysburg College.

== Biography ==
Aukerman entered college in 1893 at the age of twenty. Because of his maturity, he was elected as captain of the football team. He then emerged as one of the premier rushers of his day. Over a three-year period, he generated the winning points in wins over Dickinson, Washington & Jefferson, Franklin College and Marshall University.

He was also an accomplished track athlete for Gettysburg, running the 100- and 200-meter relays and also participating in the long jump.

Auckerman then left school to become a physical instructor at the Latrobe A.A., and was subsequently picked to be the team's first head coach in 1895. He formed what became one of the first professional football teams and is credited with scoring the first professional touchdown, with John Brallier in a game against the Jeannette Athletic Club.

Aukerman also played pro football for the Duquesne Country and Athletic Club for two games in 1895 at Exposition Park.

== Legacy ==
Aukerman was elected into the Gettysburg College Hall of Athletic Honor in 1990.
