= 1896 Pittsburgh Athletic Club football season =

American football team season

1896 Pittsburgh Athletic Club football
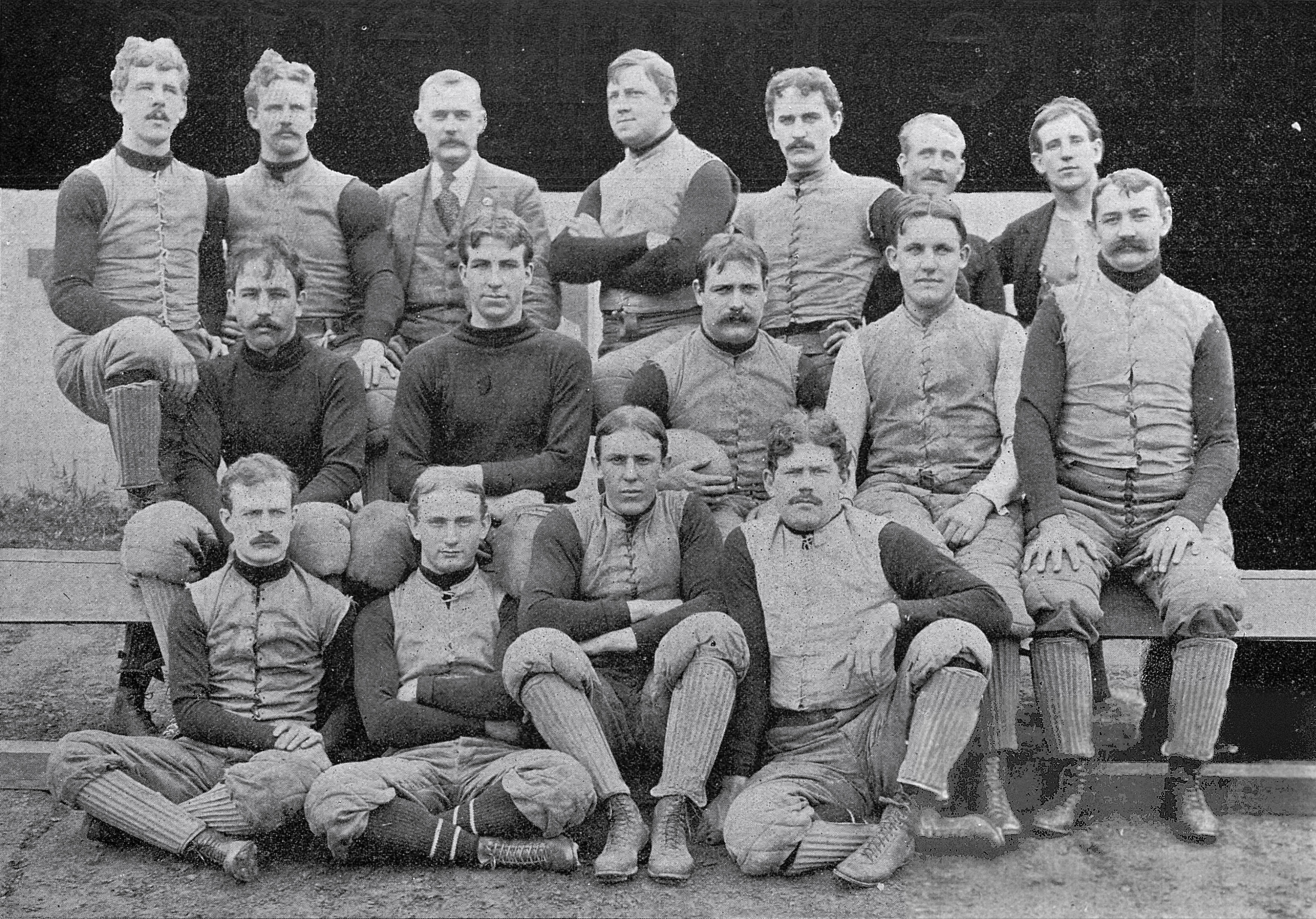
- Record: 2–5–3
- Manager: James Carothers
- Head coach: George Hoskins (Note: Pittsburgh started the season without a coach. Hoskins became the coach in mid-November.)
- Captain: G. W. Ritchey
- Home field: PAC Park

The Pittsburgh Athletic Club played its seventh season of American football in 1896. The team finished with a record of 2–5–3.

== Schedule ==
Date	Opponent	Site	Result	Attendance	Source
September 26	Western University of Pennsylvania	PAC Park; Pittsburgh, PA	W 6–4		
October 3	at Washington & Jefferson	College Park; Washington, PA	T 0–0		
October 10	Emerald Athletic Club	PAC Park; Pittsburgh, PA	W 42–0		
October 17	at Greensburg Athletic Association	Greensburg, PA	L 0–14		
October 24	West Virginia	PAC Park; Pittsburgh, PA	L 0–4	2,000	
October 31	Washington & Jefferson	PAC Park; Pittsburgh, PA	L 0–21		
November 3	Duquesne Country and Athletic Club	PAC Park; Pittsburgh, PA	L 6–12		
November 11	at Allegheny Athletic Association	Exposition Park; Allegheny, PA	L 0–18		
November 21	Greensburg Athletic Association	PAC Park; Pittsburgh, PA	T 0–0		
November 26	West Virginia (Note: Thanksgiving Day game)	PAC Park; Pittsburgh, PA	T 0–0		
