= 1901 Latrobe Athletic Association season =

American football team season

1901 Latrobe Athletic Association football
- Record: 2–1

The 1901 Latrobe Athletic Association season was their seventh season in existence. It was a low profile season for Latrobe. The team played in only 3 games this season and finished 2–1.

== Schedule ==
Game	Date	Opponent	Result
1		Derry	L 0–12
2		Latrobe Steel Works	W
3		Latrobe Steel Works	W
