= 1897 Duquesne Country and Athletic Club season =

American football team season

1897 Duquesne Country and Athletic Club football
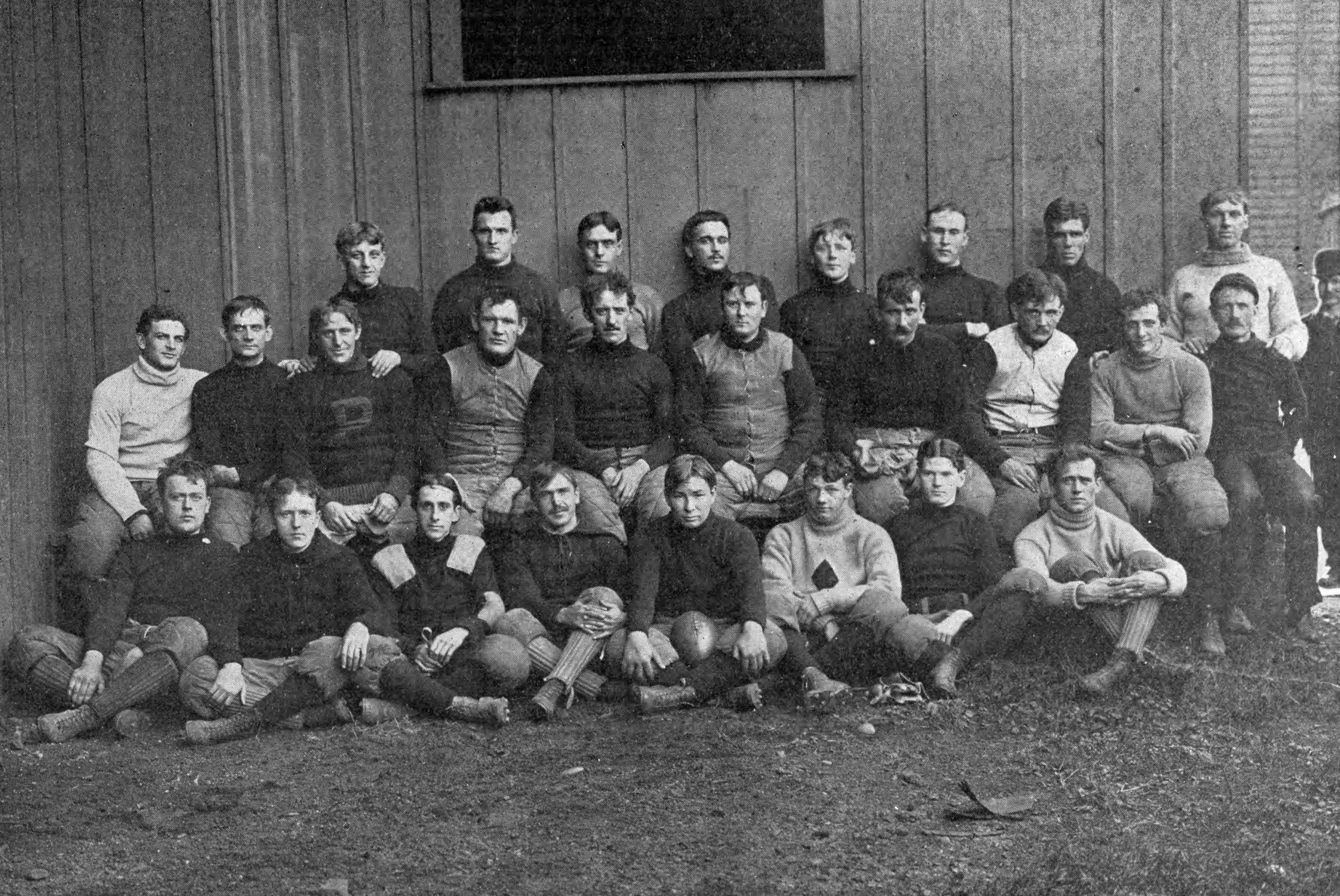
- Record: 8–3
- Manager: Ed Young (until Nov. 15); Jim Wagenhurst (after Nov. 15)
- Captain: Ed Young (3rd year)
- Home field: DC&AC Park, Exposition Park

The Duquesne Country and Athletic Club (DC&AC) of Pittsburgh, Pennsylvania played its third season of American football in 1897. The team compiled a record of 8–3.

With a victory over the Pittsburgh Athletic Club on November 20, DC&AC won the local (Allegheny County) championship and was awarded a trophy cup donated by W.S. Brown; however, the team fell short of Western Pennsylvania championship honors.

== Schedule ==
Date	Opponent	Site	Result	Attendance	Source
September 25	Imperial Athletic Club	DC&AC Park; Wilkinsburg, PA	W 30–6		
October 2	Sewickley	DC&AC Park; Wilkinsburg, PA	W 40–0		
October 9	Geneva	Exposition Park; Allegheny, PA	W 20–0	1,000	
October 16	Mahoning Cycle Club	Exposition Park; Allegheny, PA	W 16–0	1,000–1,500	
October 23	at Detroit Athletic Club	Detroit, MI	W 24–0		
October 30	Latrobe Athletic Association	Exposition Park; Allegheny, PA	W 12–6	2,000–2,500	
November 2	Pittsburgh Athletic Club	Exposition Park; Allegheny, PA	W 4–0	3,500	
November 6	Greensburg Athletic Association	Exposition Park; Allegheny, PA	L 6–24	3,000–3,500	
November 13	Detroit Athletic Club	Exposition Park; Allegheny, PA	L 10–12	2,000	
November 20	at Pittsburgh Athletic Club	PAC Park; Pittsburgh, PA	W 10–0	4,000–6,000	
November 25	Washington & Jefferson	Exposition Park; Allegheny, PA	L 0–14	12,000–20,000	
