= Dennis Ferry =

Dennis Ferry (born in Latrobe, Pennsylvania) is an internationally known trumpeter and the former Principal Trumpet of the Orchestre de la Suisse Romande in Geneva, a position that he held from October 1977 until January 2009.

== Biography ==
Born in Latrobe, Pennsylvania, Ferry began his musical education in the United States with his father, Tony Ferri, a big-band trumpeter. He obtained a Bachelor of Fine Arts in music from Carnegie Mellon University and a Master of Music from Catholic University.

He was the Principal Trumpet of the Orchestre de la Suisse Romande in Geneva from October 1977 until January 2009. Previously, he had occupied the same position in the orchestras of Jerusalem, Düsseldorf, and Rotterdam. He was also a member of The United States Air Force Band in Washington, D.C. for four years, and from 1983 to 1996 was Principal Trumpet of the Colorado Music Festival Orchestra. He has participated in over 700 live radio broadcasts and appears on over 30 commercially available recordings.

As a specialist in baroque music, he plays natural trumpet with such baroque ensembles as Les Arts Florissants, La Chapelle Royale, Gli Angeli Genève, and the Boston Early Music Festival Orchestra. He has recorded two solo CDs for Harmonia Mundi - the first on natural trumpet (Scarlatti and Melani); the second on cornet à pistons (works from the Belle Époque). In 2005, Ferry recorded the Ponchielli Trumpet Concerto with the Denver Municipal Band. In 2006, he recorded Rose Variations by Robert Russell Bennett with the same ensemble. This is one of only two recordings of Rose Variations with the original band accompaniment. The previous recording was made by John Haynie in 1958 with the University of Illinois Concert Band.

In addition to his playing career, Dennis is also active as an arranger. Morning Song (Kellaway) for brass quintet is published by Editions Bim and his brass quintet version of Grainger's Lincolnshire Posy is published by Solid Brass Music. Ferry has also authored an excerpt book on the use of high-pitched trumpets in the orchestra, Piccolo Trumpets published by Virgo Press England. He has taught and given master classes in Switzerland, the Netherlands, and the United States.

== Personal life ==
Dennis Ferry is married to flutist Stephani Stang-Ferry.

== Selected recordings ==
Ferry has appeared as a soloist on the following recordings:

- Fête de la trompette (A celebration of the trumpet), Harmonia Mundi France, 1999.
- Arias et cantates pour soprano, trompette et continuo, Harmonia Mundi France, 1984/1999.
- Stravinsky: Ragtime / Octet / Histoire du soldat / Petrushka, Chandos Records, 2007.

== Publications ==
- Dennis Ferry (arranger). Piccolo trumpets: orchestral excerpts. Virgo Music, 1989 (score)
- Percy Grainger; Dennis Ferry (arranger). Lincolnshire Posy for 2 trumpets, F horn, trombone, tuba. Solid Brass Music, 2003 (score)
- Roger Kellaway; Dennis Ferry (arranger). The morning song for brass quintet: 2 trumpets in B♭, horn in F, trombone, tuba. Editions Bim, 2004 (score)

== Sources ==
- Bradley, Jeff, Festival a vacation for notable trumpeter, Denver Post, July 29, 1996; p. F-08
- International Trumpet Guild, Dennis Ferry on US lecture tour, August 2008
- Keim, Friedel (ed.), "Ferry, Dennis", Das grosse Buch der Trompete: Instrument, Geschichte, Trompeterlexikon, Schott, 2005, p. 329. ISBN 3-7957-0530-4
- Washington Post Wedding Announcement - English.htu.cn/Washington%20post/2011/10/30/Tx16.pdf
