= Latrobe, Pennsylvania =

City in Pennsylvania, US

- Home-rule borough
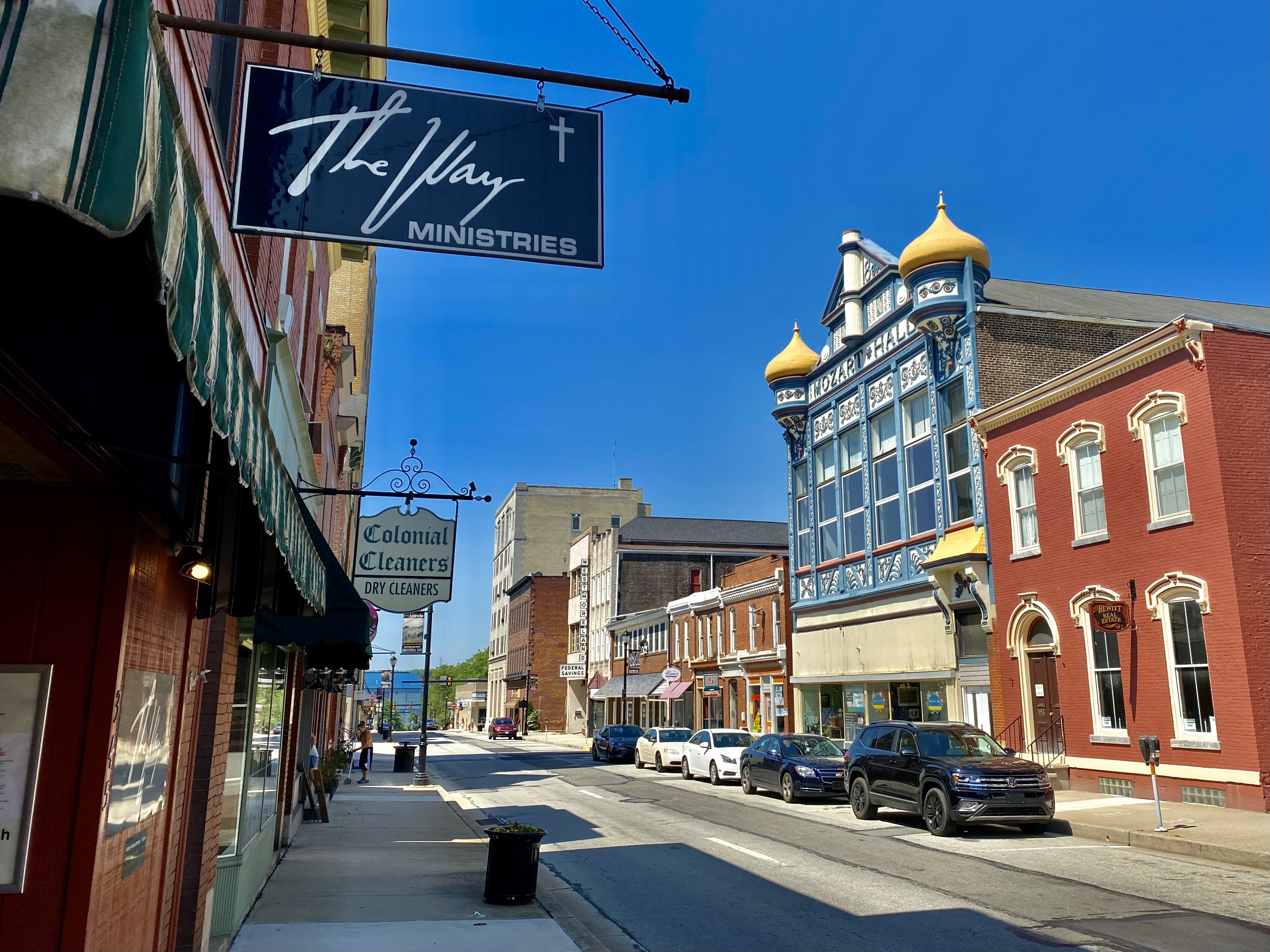
- Looking down Main Street in June 2021

- Location in Westmoreland County, Pennsylvania

- Location within Pennsylvania Location within the United States
- Coordinates: 40°18′54″N 79°22′52″W
- Country: United States
- State: Pennsylvania
- County: Westmoreland
- Settled: 1852
- Incorporated (borough): May 24, 1854
- Incorporated (city): 1999

Government
  - Type: City council
  - Mayor: Eric J. Bartels

Area
  - Total: 2.32 sq mi (6.00 km^{2})
  - Land: 2.32 sq mi (6.00 km^{2})
  - Water: 0 sq mi (0.00 km^{2})
- Elevation: 997 ft (304 m)

Population (2020)
  - Total: 8,060
  - Density: 3,480.8/sq mi (1,343.95/km^{2})
- Time zone: UTC−5 (Eastern (EST))
  - Summer (DST): UTC−4 (EDT)
- ZIP Code: 15650
- Area code: 724
- FIPS code: 42-41680
- Website: cityoflatrobe.com

Latrobe (/ləˈtroʊb/ lə-TROHB) is a borough with home-rule status in Westmoreland County, Pennsylvania, United States. The population was 8,060 at the 2020 census. It is located near Chestnut Ridge within the Pittsburgh metropolitan area.

Latrobe was the home of the Latrobe Brewing Company, the original brewer of Rolling Rock beer. Latrobe was the birthplace and childhood home of children's television personality Fred Rogers and former professional golfer Arnold Palmer. The banana split was invented there by David Strickler in 1904. Latrobe is also home to the training camp of the Pittsburgh Steelers. Latrobe was believed to be the site of the first professional American football game in 1895 until research found an 1892 game with paid players.

== History ==
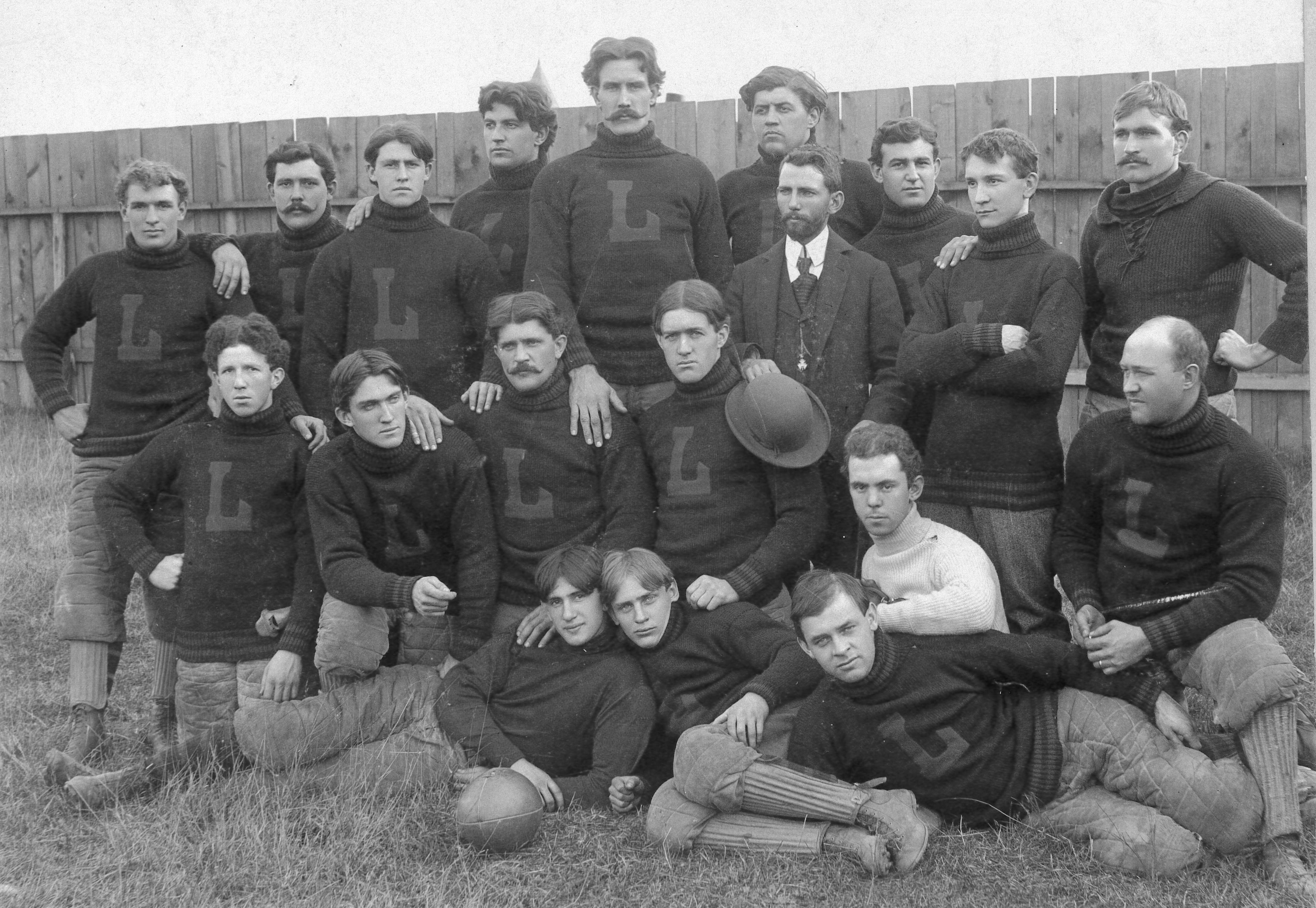
The Latrobe Athletic Association in 1897

In 1852, Pennsylvania Railroad civil engineer Oliver Barnes laid out the plans for the community that was incorporated in 1854 as the borough of Latrobe. Barnes named the town for his best friend and college classmate, Benjamin Henry Latrobe II, who was chief engineer for the Baltimore and Ohio Railroad. Its location along the route of the Pennsylvania Railroad helped Latrobe develop into a significant industrial hub. Latrobe was also served by the Ligonier Valley Railroad from 1877 to 1952.

From 1895 until 1909, Latrobe was the home of the Latrobe Athletic Association, one of the earliest professional football teams. The team's quarterback, John Brallier, became the first football player to admit playing for money. In 1895, he accepted $10 and expenses to play for Latrobe in a 12–0 victory over the Jeannette Athletic Club. Brallier was thought to be the first professional football player until the 1960s. Then, documents surfaced showing that Pudge Heffelfinger, a former three-time All-American from Yale, was employed to play guard for the Allegheny Athletic Association three years earlier. In 1897, Latrobe was the first football team to play a full season with a team composed entirely of professional players. In 1898, Latrobe and two players from their rivals, the Greensburg Athletic Association, formed the first professional football all-star team for a game against the Duquesne Country and Athletic Club, to be played at Pittsburgh's Exposition Park. Duquesne went on to win the game 16–0. On November 18, 1905, Latrobe defeated the Canton Bulldogs, which later became a founding member, and two-time champion, of the National Football League, 6–0. Aside from Brallier, the Latrobe Athletic Association included several of the era's top players, such as Ed Abbaticchio, Charles Barney, Alf Bull, Jack Gass, Walter Okeson, Harry Ryan, Doggie Trenchard, and Eddie Wood, and manager Dave Berry.

The banana split was invented in 1904 in Latrobe by David Evans Strickler at the pharmacy that later became named Strickler's Drug Store. In 2004, the National Ice Cream Retailers Association (NICRA) certified Latrobe as the birthplace of the banana split. The town holds an annual festival in honor of the dessert.

Historically, two interurban lines served Latrobe. The Westmoreland County Railway Company connected Latrobe to Derry and operated from 1904 to 1932. The Latrobe Street Railway Company connected Latrobe to Kingston and began operations in 1900. This line was purchased by West Penn Railways, which eventually linked it with its network running through Youngstown, Pleasant Unity, and eventually to Greensburg and Uniontown. Service ceased in 1952.

Coal mining was once an important industry in Westmoreland County. While mining activity has largely ceased, most of the city of Latrobe lies in a zone where abandoned underground mines are prevalent, according to a March 1, 2022, article in The Latrobe Bulletin. In 2017, a home in the city's Cramer Heights neighborhood started to collapse after its foundation shifted. The house was condemned and eventually had to be torn down. After this incident, the Pennsylvania Department of Environmental Protection urged Latrobe residents to research whether their properties are undermined and consider applying for mine subsidence insurance.

Latrobe has two sites on the National Register of Historic Places. Pennsylvania Railroad Station at Latrobe was built by the Pennsylvania Railroad in 1903. Citizens National Bank of Latrobe is a 1926 structure designed by the Greensburg firm Batholomew and Smith.

== Geography ==
Latrobe is located at 40°18′54″N 79°22′52″W (40.314940, −79.381171). According to the United States Census Bureau, the city has a total area of 2.3 square miles (6.0 km^{2}), all land. It has a hot-summer humid continental climate (Dfa) and average monthly temperatures range from 28.9 °F in January to 72.0 °F in July.

Loyalhanna Creek, a popular fishing spot, flows through Latrobe. Latrobe shares borders with the townships of Derry to the north, northwest, east, and southeast, and Unity to the west and southwest.

== Demographics ==
Historical population
Census	Pop.	Note	%±
1860	758		—
1870	1,127		48.7%
1880	1,815		61.0%
1890	3,589		97.7%
1900	4,614		28.6%
1910	8,777		90.2%
1920	9,484		8.1%
1930	10,644		12.2%
1940	11,111		4.4%
1950	11,811		6.3%
1960	11,932		1.0%
1970	11,749		−1.5%
1980	10,799		−8.1%
1990	9,265		−14.2%
2000	8,944		−3.5%
2010	8,338		−6.8%
2020	8,060		−3.3%

As of the census of 2010, 8,338 people, 3,786 households, and 2,458 families resided in the city. The population density was 3,913.6 people per square mile (1,511.0 people/km^{2}). The 4,258 housing units averaged 1,852.8 per square mile (715.4/km^{2}). The racial makeup of the city was 98.78% White, 0.32% African American, 0.08% Native American, 0.44% Asian, 0.07% from other races, and 0.31% from two or more races. Hispanics or Latinos of any race were 0.37% of the population.

Of 3,786 households, 26.0% had children under the age of 18 living with them, 48.1% were married couples living together, 11.0% had a female householder with no husband present, and 38.0% were not families. About 34.1% of all households were made up of individuals, and 17.9% had someone living alone who was 65 years of age or older. The average household size was 2.22 and the average family size was 2.86.

In the city, the population was distributed as 1,730 persons under the age of 18, 429 persons from 20 to 24, 2583 persons from 25 to 49, 1780 persons from 50 to 64, and 1614 persons who were 65 years of age or older. The median age was 42 years. For every 100 females, there were 88.0 males. For every 100 females age 18 and over, there were 83.2 males.

The median income for a household in the city was $33,268, and for a family was $42,168. Males had a median income of $31,802 versus $22,227 for females. The per capita income for the city was $18,208. About 6.5% of families and 9.4% of the population were below the poverty line, including 9.2% of those under age 18 and 7.6% of those age 65 or over.

== Economy ==
The Latrobe Brewing Company, founded in 1939, was one of the largest breweries in the United States and the maker of Rolling Rock beer. In May 2006, Anheuser-Busch purchased the Rolling Rock brands, but not the brewery. Later in 2006, the plant was bought by City Brewing Company and has since produced beers under contract for other vendors.

Metals manufacturer Kennametal was founded in Latrobe in 1938.

== Government ==
Latrobe was incorporated as a borough in 1854, and as a borough with home-rule status known as the "City of Latrobe" in 1999. Federally, Latrobe is part of Pennsylvania's 14th congressional district.

== Education ==
Latrobe is served by the public Greater Latrobe School District, which includes three elementary schools, one junior high school, and Greater Latrobe Senior High School. The high school is in nearby Unity Township.

Additionally, Saint Vincent College and Saint Vincent Seminary are in Unity Township, while having a Latrobe post office address. Both are operated by Saint Vincent Archabbey.

== Media ==
Latrobe is part of the Pittsburgh Media Market. The local newspaper, the Latrobe Bulletin, has been in print since the 1870s. Radio stations WJFG and WXVE are licensed to the borough.

== Transportation ==
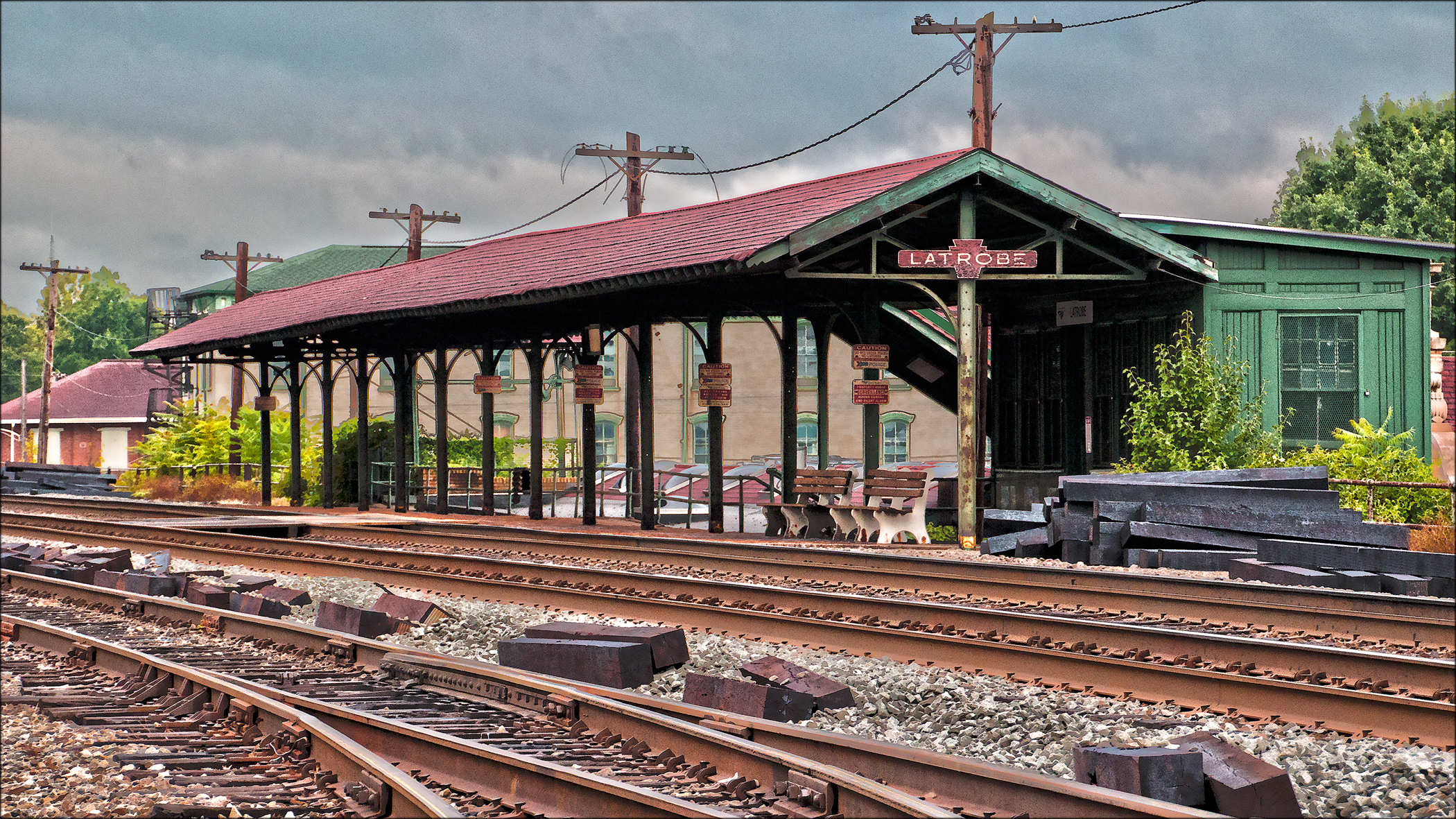
Platform at Latrobe station

Latrobe station is served by Amtrak's Pennsylvanian. Westmoreland Transit provides bus service locally and on commuter routes to Pittsburgh and Johnstown.

Arnold Palmer Regional Airport is in Unity Township, 2 miles (3.2 km) southwest of Latrobe.

== Notable people ==
- Mary Temple Bayard (1853–1916), American writer, journalist
- John Brallier (1876–1960), first openly paid professional football player and the first star of the professional game.
- Victory Brinker, an opera singer who achieved prominence at the age of nine
- Walt Corey, National Football League player and coach
- Keith Ferrazzi, author and entrepreneur
- Dennis Ferry, trumpeter for Orchestre de la Suisse Romande
- Gregory S. Forbes, meteorologist and severe weather expert for the Weather Channel
- Hanna Green, track and field runner
- Kevin Guskiewicz, Chancellor of the University of North Carolina at Chapel Hill
- Francis J. Harvey, United States Secretary of the Army
- Daniel Lentz, classical and electronic music composer
- Chris Lightcap, jazz bassist
- Jackie Mason, comedian and actor after serving as a rabbi in Latrobe
- Arnold Palmer, iconic professional golfer, member of World Golf Hall of Fame
- Fred Rogers, creator and host of PBS series Mister Rogers' Neighborhood, lived in Latrobe from birth through high school. He is buried in Unity Cemetery.
- Eliza Kennedy Smith, also known as Mrs. R. Templeton Smith; suffragist, civic activist, and government watchdog, and president of the Allegheny County League of Women Voters
- Andy Stynchula, National Football League player
- Scott Warner, lighting designer and fixture development
- Boniface Wimmer, Benedictine monk, founded Saint Vincent Archabbey in 1846

== See also ==
- Latrobe Country Club
