= 1900 Greensburg Athletic Association season =

American football team season

1900 Greensburg Athletic Association football
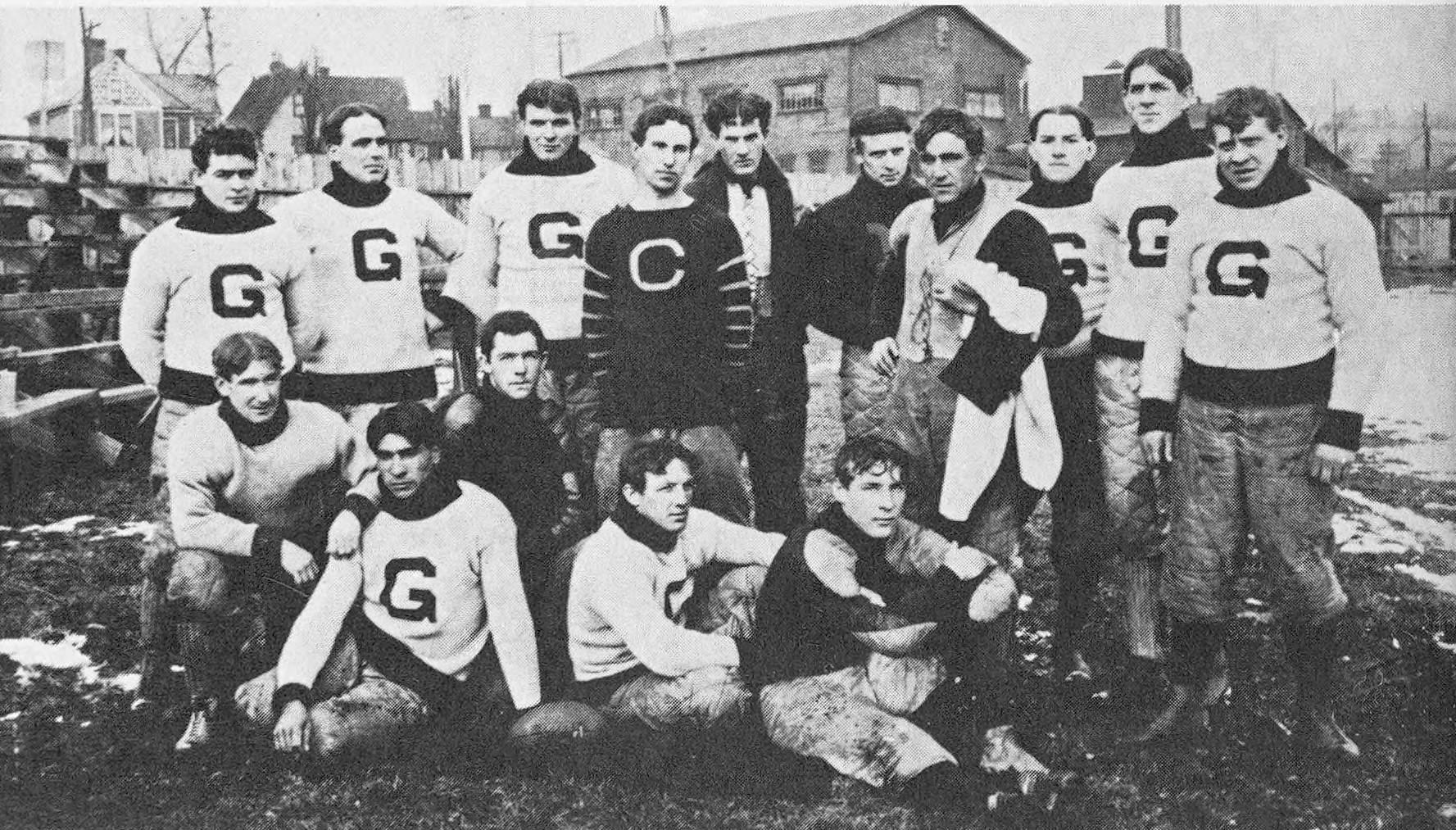
- Record: 4–5–1
- Manager: Joseph E. Mitinger
- Head coach: Ralph Hutchinson
- Captain: Ralph Hutchinson
- Home field: Athletic Park

The 1900 Greensburg Athletic Association season was Greensburg Athletic's 10th and last season. The American football team finished with a record of 4–5–1.

== Schedule ==
Game	Date	Opponent	Result	Source
1	October 6	Juniata (Altoona)	W 23–0	
2	October 10	Indiana Normal	W 11–0	
3	October 13	at East End Athletic Association	T 0–0	
4	October 17	Pittsburgh Cottage Club	W 54–0 or 58–0	
5	October 20	Homestead Library Athletic Club	L 5–6	
6	October 27	Latrobe Athletic Association	L 0–6	
7	October 31	at Duquesne Country and Athletic Club	L 0–24	
8	November 6	at Juniata (Altoona)	W 22–0	
9	November 10	at Homestead Library Athletic Club	L 0–12	
10	November 17	at Latrobe Athletic Association (Note: A third Latrobe-Greensburg game was scheduled for Thanksgiving Day. However Latrobe manager Dave Berry preferred to play undefeated Homestead team instead. He was forced to pay Greensburg $400 for cancelling the third meeting.)	L 0–11	
