= 1898 Pittsburgh Athletic Club football season =

American football team season

1898 Pittsburgh Athletic Club football
- Record: 4–3–2
- Manager: F. K. Gray
- Head coach: Sam Boyle
- Captain: Sam Boyle
- Home field: PAC Park

The Pittsburgh Athletic Club played its ninth and last season of American football in 1898. Led by coach and captain Sam Boyle, the team compiled a 4–3–2 record. The team played its home games at PAC Park at the corner of Larimer Avenue and Shetland Street, Pittsburgh.

== Schedule ==
Date	Opponent	Site	Result	Attendance	Source
October 8	Pittsburgh College	PAC Park; Pittsburgh, PA	T 0–0		
October 15	Bradford Company C	PAC Park; Pittsburgh, PA	W 23–0	1,200	
October 27	West Virginia	PAC Park; Pittsburgh, PA	W 18–0	1,000	
October 29	Washington & Jefferson	PAC Park; Pittsburgh, PA	L 0–11	2,500–3,000	
November 5	Grove City	PAC Park; Pittsburgh, PA	W 11–6		
November 8	at Duquesne Country and Athletic Club	Exposition Park; Allegheny, PA	L 0–34	5,000–6,000	
November 19	Greensburg Athletic Association	PAC Park; Pittsburgh, PA	T 0–0	300	
November 24	Latrobe Athletic Association	PAC Park; Pittsburgh, PA	W 6–0	2,500–3,000	
November 30	at Duquesne Country and Athletic Club	Exposition Park; Allegheny, PA	L 0–27	250–500	
