= Walter R. Okeson =

American football player and coach (1875–1943)

Profile
- Position: End

Personal information
- Born: October 3, 1875; Port Royal, Pennsylvania, U.S.
- Died: November 4, 1943 (aged 68); Bethlehem, Pennsylvania. U.S.

Career history

Playing
- 1897: Latrobe Athletic Association
- 1898: Duquesne Country & A. C.

Coaching
- 1897: Latrobe Athletic Association
- 1900: Lehigh
- 1901: Lehigh (assistant)

Awards and highlights
- College coaching record: 5–6; Professional coaching record: 10–2–1; All-Western Pennsylvania team (1897); W. Pennsylvania champion (1898); Played in first Pro Football All-Star Game (1898); Lehigh Athletics Hall of Fame

Walter Raleigh "Okey" Okeson (October 3, 1875 – November 4, 1943) was an American football player and coach. He was a player-coach for the first all-professional football team, the Latrobe Athletic Association club in 1897. Okeson was the head football coach at Lehigh University in Bethlehem, Pennsylvania for one season, in 1900, compiling a record of 5–6.

Okeson was also an All-American end at Lehigh. In 1897 he was a player-coach for the Latrobe Athletic Association and led the team to a 10–2–1 record. He was later named to the "All Western Pennsylvania Team" by The Pittsburg Times after the season. In 1898, he played for the Duquesne Country and Athletic Club. At the end of that season, Okeson played for Duquesne against the 1898 Western Pennsylvania All-Star football team, formed by Latrobe manager Dave Berry. Duquesne won the game, 16–0.

Okeson was the chairman of the College Football Rules Committee for a time. He was also the editor for the 1933–1940 editions of Spalding's Foot Ball Guide. The 1934 edition of the Guide contained a "National Champion Foot Ball Teams" list compiled by football historian Parke H. Davis, who died before publication. As editor, Okeson was responsible for the subsequent additions to this list in the 1935 and 1936 editions of the Guide, which were then titled "Outstanding Nationwide and Sectional Teams" that were "Originally Compiled by the late Parke H. Davis."

In the 1939 Guide, Okeson wrote,

"In that year (1897), then, 'pro' foot ball started with the two teams of the Latrobe Athletic Club and the Greensburg Athletic Club. I remember it rather distinctly, as I was engaged to coach the Latrobe team ... I can truthfully say that I saw 'pro' foot ball born and have watched its growth, at first spasmodic but of late years steady and successful. ... After 50 years of football as a player in prep school, college and professional teams, as a coach of high school, college and 'pro' teams, as an official, a graduate manager, a Commissioner of Officials, Chairman of the Foot Ball Rules Committee, I am convinced that calling foot ball part of the educational program is a lot of 'hooey.' ... [L]et the schools and the colleges tend to the job of education. ... Permit foot ball to hold its place as the greatest game ever devised for young men who love body contact, as the highlight in the college sports program."

Okeson was elected to the Lehigh University Athletics Hall of Fame in 1999.

== Head coaching record ==
=== College ===
Year	Team	Overall	Conference	Standing	Bowl/playoffs
Lehigh (Independent) (1900)
1900	Lehigh	5–6			
Lehigh:		5–6			
Total:		5–6			
