= 1898 Duquesne Country and Athletic Club season =

1898 Duquesne Country and Athletic Club football
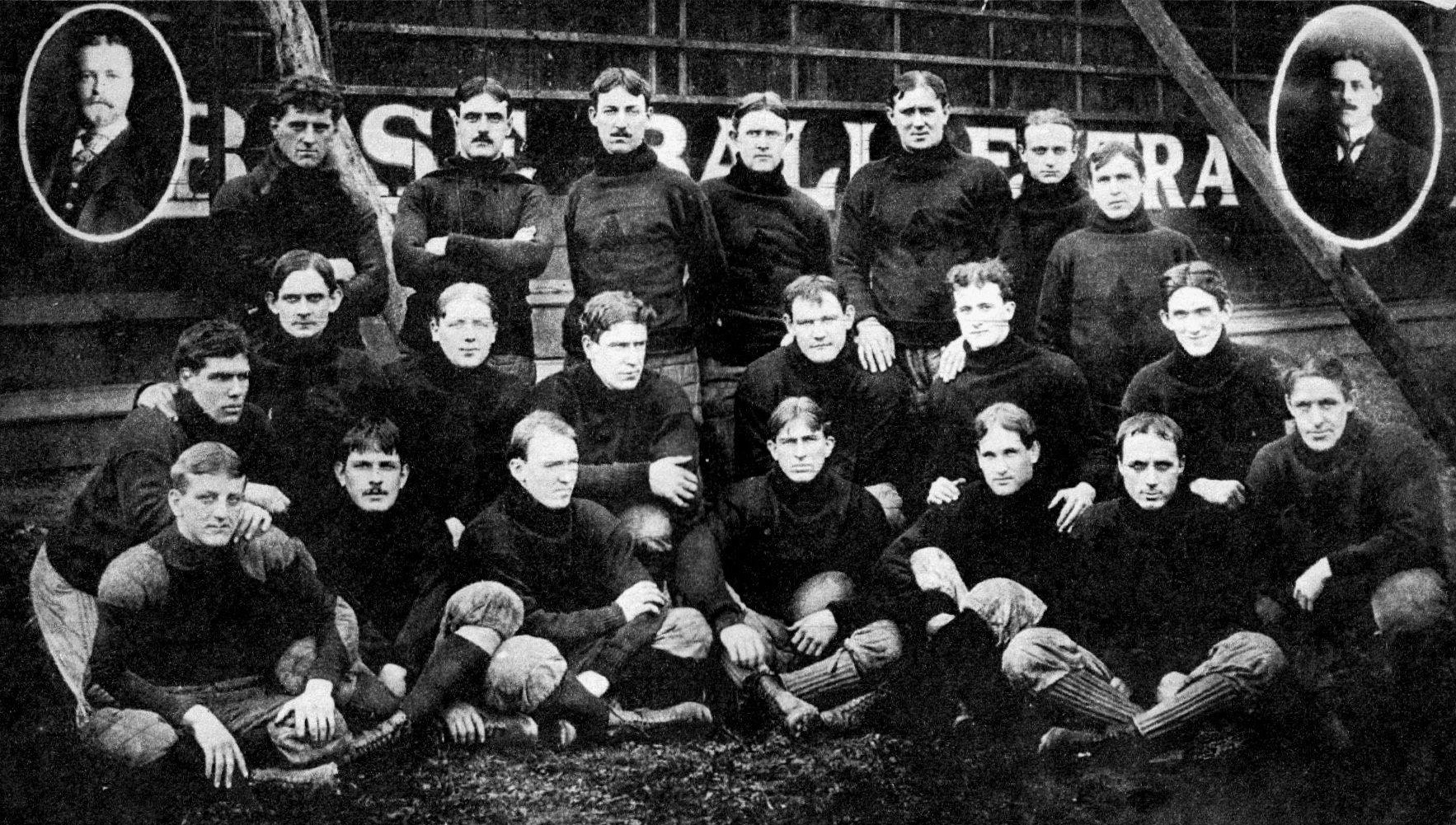
- Record: 11–0–1
- Chairman: William Chase Temple
- Manager: W. M. Greenwood
- Head coach: Roy Jackson
- Captain: Roy Jackson
- Home field: Exposition Park

The Duquesne Country and Athletic Club played its fourth season of American football in 1898. The team finished with a record of 11–0–1. The team was named the top team in western Pennsylvania. Roy Jackson was the team's captain and coach.

== Open professionalism ==
The team this season was, according to the New York Sun, "generally regarded as the chief exponent of professionalism" in football. Duquesne's chairman William C. Temple publicly admitted that the team was professional, distinguishing it from the previous season's team which he claimed was "strictly amateur". Temple explained that hiring paid players was necessary to meet the public's demand for good football.

== Schedule ==
| Date | Opponent | Site | Result | Source |
|---|---|---|---|---|
| October 8 | Maryland Athletic Club | Exposition Park; Allegheny, PA | W 46–0 | |
| October 15 | at Knickerbocker Athletic Club | Berkeley Oval; New York, NY | W 45–0 | |
| October 22 | Pittsburgh College | Exposition Park; Allegheny, PA | W 16–0 | |
| October 29 | Penn State | Exposition Park; Allegheny, PA | W 18–5 | |
| November 2 | Braddock | Exposition Park; Allegheny, PA | W 63–0 | |
| November 5 | Geneva | Exposition Park; Allegheny, PA | W 68–0 | |
| November 8 | Pittsburgh Athletic Club | Exposition Park; Allegheny, PA | W 34–0 | |
| November 12 | Greensburg Athletic Association | Exposition Park; Allegheny, PA | T 0–0 | |
| November 19 | Latrobe Athletic Association | Exposition Park; Allegheny, PA | W 17–0 | |
| November 24 | Washington & Jefferson (Note: Thanksgiving Day game) | Exposition Park; Allegheny, PA | W 11–0 | |
| November 30 | Pittsburgh Athletic Club (Note: Postponed from Saturday, November 26 because of snow.) | Exposition Park; Allegheny, PA | W 27–0 | |
| December 3 | Western Pennsylvania All-Stars (Note: This was the 1st professional football "all-star" game, as Duquesne played a team that consisted of several of top football players in western Pennsylvania.) | Exposition Park; Allegheny, PA | W 16–0 | |
