= Charles L. Barney =

American football player and strongman

Lloyd Barney
Profile
- Positions: Center, Tackle, Guard

Personal information
- Born: October 16, 1874; Michigan
- Died: 1913 (aged 38–39); Des Moines, Iowa

Career information
- College: Ohio Wesleyan University

Career history
- Latrobe Athletic Association (1898–1900); Pittsburgh Stars (1902)

Charles Lloyd Barney (1874-1913) was an early professional football player and strongman. In 1897 he played college football at Ohio Wesleyan University. There he was a classmate, teammate and roommate of Fielding Yost. He appeared at expositions and shows lifting horses, breaking chains, and performing other feats of strength. From 1898 through 1900, Barney played professional football for the Latrobe Athletic Association. He was best remembered, by his teammates, for lifting a piano and holding it while a man played it. In 1902, he played in the first National Football League for the Pittsburgh Stars.
