= Latrobe Athletic Association =

Professional American football team in Latrobe, Pennsylvania (1895-1909)

Logo

General information
- Founded: 1895
- Folded: 1909
- Stadium: Latrobe YMCA
- Headquartered: Latrobe, Pennsylvania, United States
- Colors: Orange, maroon (1895) Red, blue (1897–1900) Red, green (1903–1907)

Personnel
- Owner: Latrobe YMCA
- General manager: David J. Berry (1895–1900); John Brallier (1903–1907)
- Head coach: Russell Aukerman (1895); John Brallier (1896); Walter Okeson (1897); Alfred E. Bull (1898); Russell Knight (1900); John Brallier (1902–1907)

Nickname
- "Latrobers"

Team history
- Latrobe Athletic Association (1895–1907)

League / conference affiliations
- Western Pennsylvania Circuit

The Latrobe Athletic Association was a professional football team located in Latrobe, Pennsylvania, from 1895 until 1909. A member of the unofficial Western Pennsylvania Professional Football Circuit, the team is best known for being the first football club to play a full season while composed entirely of professional players. In 1895, team's quarterback, John Brallier, also became the first football player to openly turn professional, by accepting $10 and expenses to play for Latrobe against the Jeannette Athletic Club.

== Origins ==
In 1895 the local Latrobe YMCA organized a local football team and announced that the team play a formal schedule. With the decision, Russell Aukerman, an instructor at the club and a former halfback at Gettysburg College, was named as a player-coach. Meanwhile, David Berry, an editor-publisher of a local newspaper, the Latrobe Clipper, was chosen as the team's manager. Harry Ryan, a former tackle from West Virginia University, was then elected as the team's captain. The team was formed and began to conduct daily practices in early August. Since many of the players held jobs unrelated to football, those men working different shifts were accommodated with evening practices, when they could not attend regular sessions in the afternoon. The team's practices were held on a vacant Pennsylvania Railroad lot at the corner of Depot and Alexandria Streets, which was lit at night by a street light.

=== First admitted professional football player ===
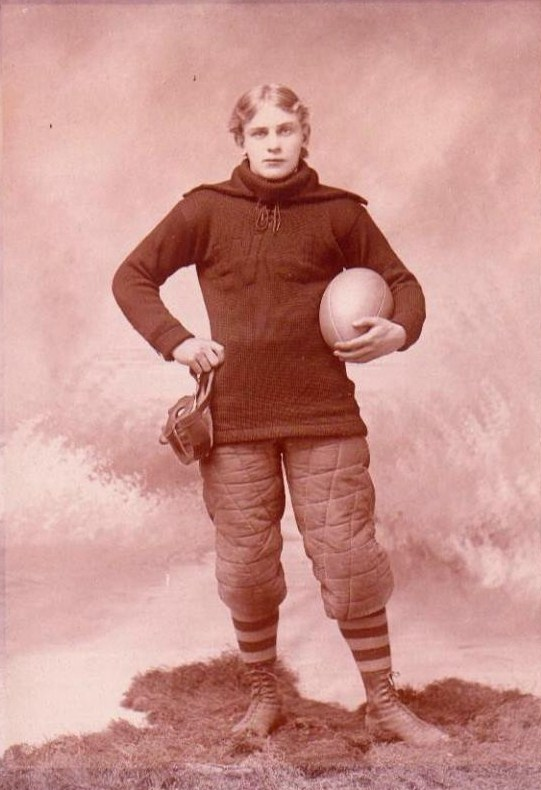
John Brallier, the first football player to admit to being a professional

Just before the start of the season, Latrobe's quarterback, Eddie Blair, found himself in a scheduling conflict. Blair, who also played baseball in nearby Greensburg, discovered that the team's first football game against the Jeannette Athletic Club conflicted with a prior baseball commitment. Berry was now given the task for replacing Blair, for the game. He heard of a quarterback at Indiana Normal named John Brallier and contacted him at his home in Indiana, Pennsylvania. Berry offered Brallier expenses to play for Latrobe. However Brallier was reluctant to play since he would be playing for Washington & Jefferson College within just a few weeks. This led Berry to offer Brallier $10 to play for Latrobe against Jeannette, plus expenses, with the promise of several future games. Brallier, accepted the offer and became the first player to openly admit to being paid to play football player. The quarterback arrived in Latrobe the night before the game and practiced with the team.

While Brallier was considered the first professional football player and deemed a national icon for many years, it was not until after his death in 1960 that evidence proved John Brallier was not in fact the first professional football player, but merely the first one to openly admit that he was being paid. William "Pudge" Heffelfinger of the Allegheny Athletic Association is now considered the first professional player.

== Early years ==
=== 1895 season ===
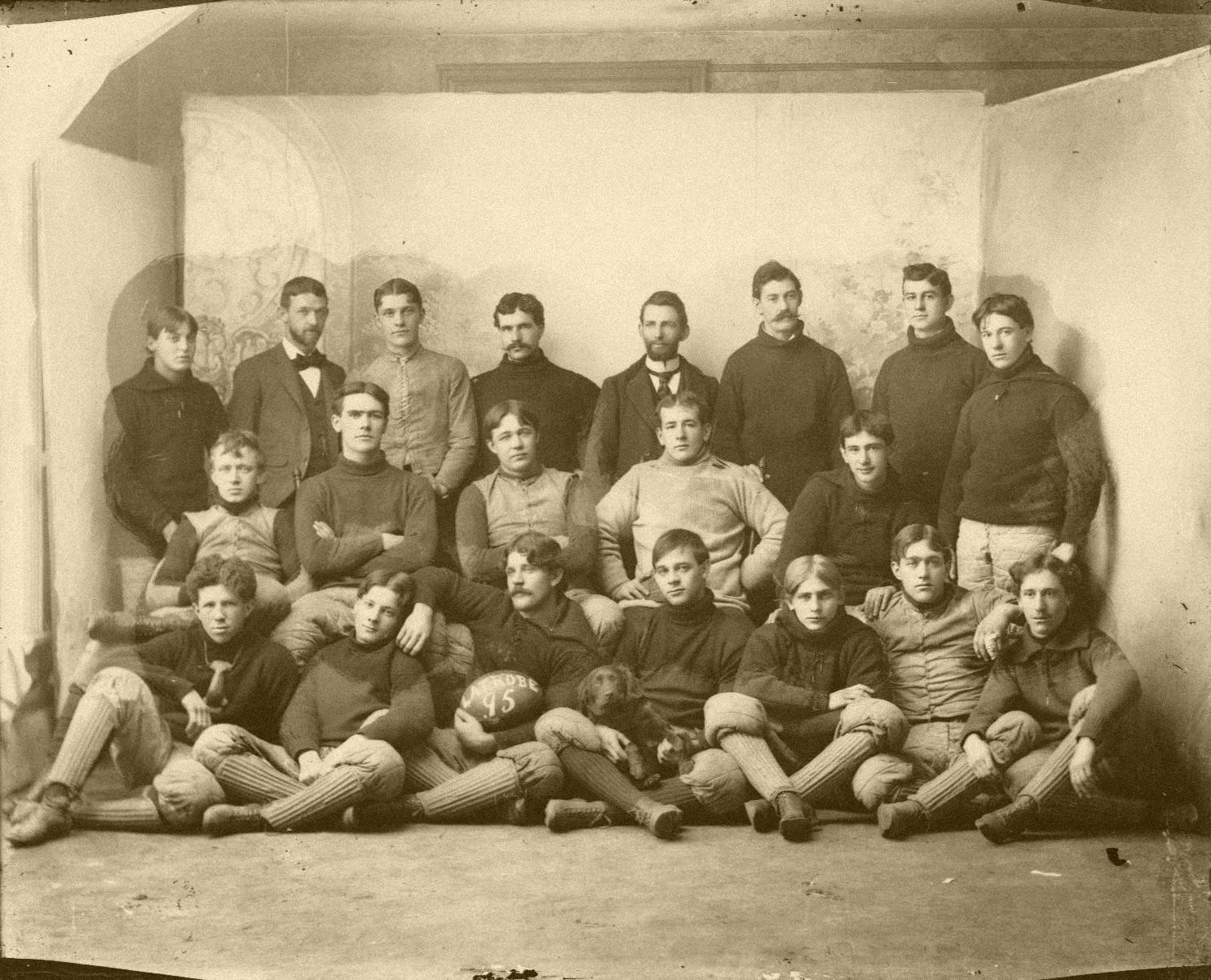
Latrobe's 1895 team

The first game of Latrobe's 1895 season was played on a Tuesday afternoon on September 3, 1895. Before the game, a parade formed on newly paved Ligonier Street. The parade was led by Billy Showalter’s Cornet Band, followed by both the Latrobe and Jeannette teams in full uniforms. The Latrobe team colors of orange and maroon were displayed in store windows and hotels, and on street corner poles. Stores were closed, and steel mines, coal and coke works declared a half-holiday for the occasion. The game began at 4:00 pm with Latrobe coming out as the victor over Jeannette. Latrobe's coach, Russell Auckerman, scored two touchdowns (each worth four points at the time), while Brallier kicked two extra points (then worth 2 points each) for a final score of 12–0.

After the initial game, Brallier played a second game with Latrobe, before traveling to Washington & Jefferson for college. The game was held on September 14, against a squad from Altoona, Pennsylvania, and ended in a 7–0 Latrobe loss. While at Washington & Jefferson, Brallier became the college's varsity quarterback. Meanwhile, the 1895 Latrobe YMCA team ended up playing 11 games, for a record of 7–4 with two losses to their cross-county rivals, the Greensburg Athletic Association, and single losses to Altoona and West Virginia University.

=== 1896 ===
Latrobe fielded a team for a second season in 1896. Many of the players on team had returned from the year before. Brallier accepted an offer to return to the team and served as the team's quarterback and coach. The team started off with wins against the Pittsburgh Imperials, the renamed Jeannette Indians, Altoona, and Western University of Pennsylvania (renamed the University of Pittsburgh in 1908) before finally losing to the Greensburg Athletic Association, 10–4. The team later split a two-game series against West Virginia University and won against Indiana Normal, before once again losing to the Greensburg Athletic Association, 10–0, to finish with a 7–3 record.

=== First All-Pro team ===
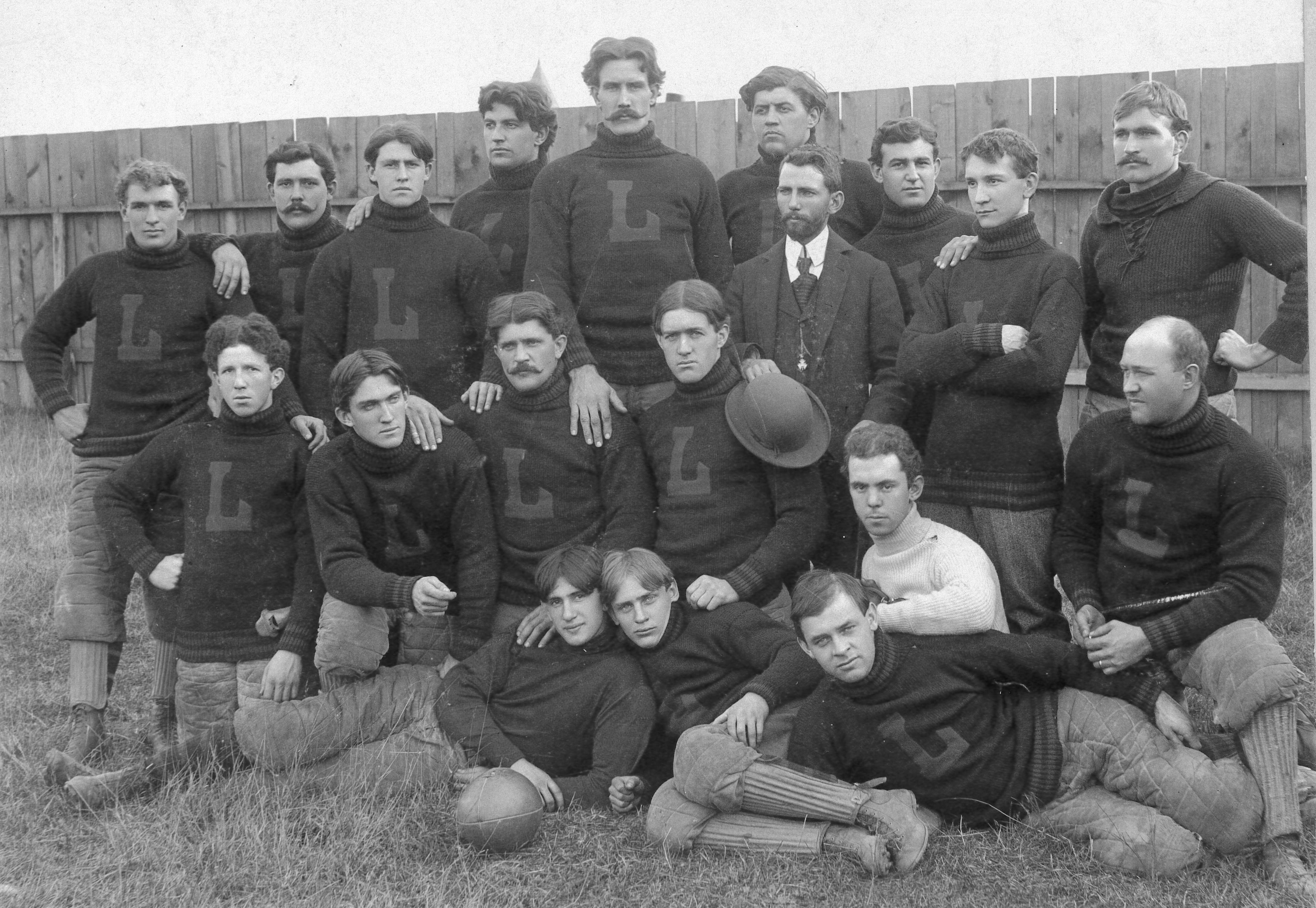
1897 Latrobe team, the first all-professional football team to play an entire season

The 1897 Latrobe team was composed entirely of professional players. Berry had signed a number of college players from east coast colleges, some as far west as Iowa, to the team. Meanwhile, Walter Okeson, a former All-American end from Lehigh University, was named as the team's coach. George Shelafo of the Carlisle Indian School, located in Carlisle, Pennsylvania, also joined Latrobe that season. Shelafo was set to play for the University of Chicago that fall before he was lured to Latrobe by Berry.

The team began the season 7–0–1 with wins over Jeannette, Pittsburgh Emeralds, Pittsburgh College, Western University of Pennsylvania, and a team from Youngstown, Ohio. After the team's game against Western University of Pennsylvania, Doggie Trenchard and Eddie Blair, the team's original quarterback who was replaced by Brallier in 1895, joined the team. The team remained undefeated before facing the Duquesne Country and Athletic Club for a 12–6 loss at Exposition Park. However, the team did rebound to defeat the Pittsburgh Athletic Club, and Youngstown in back-to-back games. The championship of western Pennsylvania was expected to be a battle between the Duquesne and Pittsburgh Athletic Club. However both Greensburg and Youngstown ended up defeating Duquesne. This led to talk of a championship game between Greensburg and Latrobe. However, with the season still incomplete, a regular season game between the two clubs took place in Greensburg on November 20, 1897. The game resulted in a hard fought 12–6 victory for Latrobe in what locals called “one of the greatest games ever played in western Pennsylvania.” However, after an 18–0 defeat at the hands of West Virginia, Latrobe lost the final game of the season to Greensburg, 6–0. However a Pittsburgh-based football expert picked an all-western Pennsylvania team from among the region's amateur, pro, and college teams, and three of the 11 players chosen were from the Latrobe club. These members were Walter Okeson (end), Harry Ryan (tackle), and Ed Abbaticchio (fullback).

== First all-star team and down years (1898–1902) ==
Latrobe's manager, David J. Berry

The Latrobe squad remained a strong competitor for the next several seasons. However, the team did not provide much of a challenge for the western Pennsylvania championship. The 1898 team started off to a 7–0 record, before losing three games to Pittsburgh Athletic Club, Duquesne Country and Athletic Club and Greensburg to finish 7–3.

After their 1898 season first all-star team in professional football history, composed of early football players, from several teams in the area. The team was formed by Latrobe manager, Dave Berry, for the purpose of playing the Duquesne Country and Athletic Club, which fielded a team composed of many of the game's stars from the era. The game between the two clubs ended in a 16–0 Duquesne victory and is considered to be the very first all-star game for professional football. Contrary to popular belief, while the game was held at Exposition Park, which would be currently located inside of the city limits of Pittsburgh, Pennsylvania, the 1898 location of the game was Allegheny, Pennsylvania which was not incorporated into the city of Pittsburgh until 1907.

The very next season marked the team's first undefeated season, despite only playing four games. However, the 1898, 1899 and 1900 seasons did showcase what can historically be considered Latrobe's most colorful player, Charles Barney. Off the field, Barney had a reputation for entertaining both fans and fellow players by lifting and holding a piano while a man played it. The 1901 Latrobe season was another low-profile year, the team played only three games for a 2–1 record. But the stage was set for a later resurgence with development of some squad members. The team lost, 12–0, to a squad from nearby Derry and won two games over teams picked up from men working at Latrobe Steel.

=== "Wait until next year" ===
John Brallier rejoined the team as player-coach for the 1902 season. Latrobe once again played only a small number of games (four) that fall. After posting scoreless ties against Indiana Normal and the Wilkinsburg Sterling Athletic Club, the team defeated the Indiana First Regiment team, 22–2. In the season finale, Latrobe defeated the Latrobe Steel Works, 17–0. At the end of the season most of the team's followers and players were optimistic about the club's future. Most of Brallier’s players were between the ages of 17–18 years and expressed a desire to learn, and drilled for long hours in fundamentals. Brallier correctly, as it turned out, anticipated what was reflected in street conversation throughout Latrobe, “wait until next year.”

== Undefeated seasons ==
=== 1903 ===
In 1903, the Latrobe YMCA was organized under the leadership of the Latrobe Steel Works, and its membership included many of the players from the 1902 team. A football organization was formed with Brallier once again serving as a player-coach. A fence was built around the Latrobe Steel Athletic Grounds and new uniforms were ordered with money donated by several local merchants. Further experience was added when several former players of the 1890s rejoined the team. Locally, Latrobe was the acclaimed western Pennsylvania champion after posting the undefeated season. While the Franklin Athletic Club was generally considered the "U.S. Pro Champion" that year, the team had refused to play Latrobe.

Ironically for a team that made history by fielding an all-professional line-up for a complete season in 1897, the 1903 Latrobe team was composed entirely of amateurs. Brallier reflected in 1934 that the 1903 Latrobe backfield “was the best I had ever played with and the best I have ever seen.” However, despite their winning season, the Latrobe team was losing money. Crowds for the games were small, which led to a drop in revenue.

=== 1904 ===
At a team meeting on June 4, 1904, Brallier was once again elected as the team's coach and manager, and Harry Ryan was again elected as the team's captain. Latrobe's 1904 season ended in another undefeated season for the team. In an effort to keep expenses down, the team reportedly used just nine footballs throughout the season. After all debts and expenses were paid, the 16 players divided up about $500 in profits. A big post-season event was a chicken and waffle benefit supper at Latrobe's Mozart Hall, at which over 5,000 waffles “rolled in pools of chicken gravy” were consumed. The Hotel Mahaney also held a banquet for the team.

However tragedy did strike the team shortly after the season. Paul Blair, a Latrobe player and the brother of Eddie Blair, was killed when he was hit by train walking along the Pennsylvania Railroad line between Latrobe and Derry. Latrobe players Harry Ryan and John Brallier served as pallbearers at the funeral. The team also reportedly sent a beautiful floral wreath, to the Blair home. In the wreath, draped in team colors, were the words "Latrobe Football Team, 1904".

=== 1905 ===
By this time it had been three years since Latrobe posted a defeat, and the team scored on only once in the last two seasons. The 1905 season saw a mood of optimism in Latrobe. Several new college players were signed to the team. The team and the community provided new jobs to bring some more football talent, and to keep others there. However scheduling was difficult, with many teams either refusing to play Latrobe or asking overly high financial guarantees. Still the team did manage to secure an 8–0 record without giving up a point.

During the season, Latrobe took part in a high-profile game against the Canton Bulldogs. The Bulldogs were a professional team widely renowned in the unofficial "Ohio League" and would later become a founding member, and two-time champion, of the National Football League. Canton was a particularly strong team that scored over 100 points in many of its games. A game between the two clubs was arranged November 18, 1905 in Latrobe. Despite injuries to several of the Latrobe players, the team went on to defeat the Bulldogs 6–0. A season-ending game against Canton's "Ohio League" rivals, the Massillon Tigers, was proposed but never occurred.

On December 2, 1905, the Latrobe Bulletin devoted a full page to the three-year Latrobe record of 26–0, and 794–5 points spread. Furthermore, the Pittsburgh Chronicle Telegraph published two teams of all-stars, and among western Pennsylvania 22 teams. The paper cited were five Latrobe players: Hayes (tackle), Van Doren (tackle), Harry Ryan (guard), Gibson (guard), and Brallier (quarterback). At the end of the year, a Football Association was being planned to include teams in Latrobe, Steelton, Franklin, and Pittsburgh representing Pennsylvania, and the Akron Indians, the Canton Bulldogs, the Massillon Tigers, and Shelby Blues representing Ohio. The plan was for the teams to settle championships within each state, with the two state winners to meet in a championship game on Thanksgiving Day. Salary limits were reportedly established, while other details were worked out. However, the project never materialized.

== Decline ==
=== 1906 season ===
The 1906 season saw the beginning of the decline of professional football in Latrobe. Many players were still attracted to Latrobe for football, and many players remained in the community, working in industrial, mining, and mercantile jobs. The success of the three years through 1905 brought inquiries from prominent players all over the nation who wanted to come to Latrobe in 1906. However, an effort to obtain funds with which to pay players apparently failed when 25 shares at $100 each were not subscribed.

On November 29, 1906, the Latrobe was defeated for the first time in four years by Canton, 16–0. On top of that, Latrobe had been guaranteed $1,500 for the game, $1,200 of which was to be used to pay the players, and $300 for expenses. But the Canton's manager Blondy Wallace was unable to pay, the result of the fallout from an infamous betting scandal between Massillon and Canton. The problems had soured Canton's 1,200 fans who turned out for the game, further complicating things. Canton players were not paid as a result, in addition. To help pay for the Latrobe team's expenses an effort was established in Latrobe, which raised part of the team's $300 expense debt, and the balance of the money was borrowed by the YMCA so that it could be paid.

=== 1907 season ===
By October 1907, sentiment in Latrobe had grown for keeping the football team comprising local men and not hiring players from out of town. However, despite the changing atmosphere, the 1907 season was moderately successful with a 5–2–2 record. Harry Ryan was retired; while John Brallier served mainly as a coach. Leo Gibson was then elected as Latrobe's captain.

==== California YMCA game ====
During that 1907 season, the California (Pennsylvania) YMCA team came to Latrobe for a game, and was ejected from its rooms at the Parker House for "chasing and frightening a chambermaid," jumping on beds and breaking two of them, and for language "far from what might be asked for from YMCA boys." Latrobe would go on to win the game, 38–0, in front of a small crowd. It was claimed that the YMCA team, despite its name, was not connected to the Young Men's Christian Association and that there was no YMCA located in California.

=== 1908–1909 ===
The decrease in community interest and the change of the team from a professional football club to local amateur team, coincided with John Brallier's last year as a player, although he continued to help coach local teams. Some of the players continued with the 1908 and 1909 loose amateur squads, captained by Peck Lawson, however the out-of town players and the old rivalries had generally disappeared.

== Legacy ==
Several of the prominent members of the original Latrobe professional football teams, including Brallier, Ryan, Abbaticchio and Peck Lawson, lived around Latrobe for many years. Ed Abbaticchio, outside of football, also played baseball in the National League for the Philadelphia Phillies, Pittsburgh Pirates, and in between played in Boston (for the club that is now the Atlanta Braves). He was also a part of the Pirates' 1909 World Series team. John Brallier practiced dentistry in Latrobe, and the others were generally employed in locally. Brallier later spent 20 years as a school director, from which he retired at the end of 1931. In 1979, John Brallier was voted one of the "Best Pros Not in the Hall of Fame" by the Professional Football Researchers Association.

After World War II, the success of baseball's Hall of Fame spawned plans for a similar football hall. At that time, Latrobe was recognized by the National Football league as the birthplace of professional football, and Brallier was given a lifetime pass for NFL games. However, the Hall of Fame was awarded to Canton, but homage was paid to Latrobe's status when the Pittsburgh Steelers and Green Bay Packers played an exhibition game there on August 29, 1952. The event also honored the early pro player survivors.

Today Latrobe is home to the Pittsburgh Steelers training camp, located at Saint Vincent College.

== Team colors ==
Latrobe's original team colors of maroon and orange changed "several times during the next decade" according to researcher Robert B. Van Atta. The colors were red and blue in at least 1897, 1898, and 1900; and red and green in at least the 1903–1907 seasons.
