= Harry Ryan (American football) =

Harry "Cap" Ryan
Profile
- Positions: Tackle, Guard

Personal information
- Born: October 28, 1868; Greensburg, Pennsylvania
- Died: July 29, 1953 (aged 84); Latrobe, Pennsylvania

Career information
- College: West Virginia

Career history
- 1895–1901: Latrobe Athletic Association
- 1896: Punxsutawney
- 1898: Western Pennsylvania All-Stars
- 1902: Philadelphia Phillies
- 1903–1906: Latrobe Athletic Association

Awards and highlights
- All Western Pennsylvania Team (1897); Played in the first pro football all-star game (1898)

Harry Wilson "Cap" Ryan (October 28, 1868 – July 29, 1953) was an early professional football player for the Latrobe Athletic Association from 1895 until 1906. He was also selected to be the first captain in that team's history.

== Career ==
Ryan played alongside John Brallier, who is considered the first openly professional football player. In 1897 he was named to the "All Western Pennsylvania Team" by The Pittsburg Times.

In 1898, he was selected by Latrobe manager David Berry to play for the Western Pennsylvania All-Stars in the very first football all-star game, against the Duquesne Country and Athletic Club. Ryan also served as advisor to Berry until 1902 when he went to Philadelphia to start the first National Football League. Ryan would play in the league for the Philadelphia Phillies that year.
