= Jeannette Athletic Club =

American football team based in Jeannette, Pennsylvania (1894-1906)

The Jeannette Athletic Club, also referred to as the Jeannette Indians, was an early football team, based in Jeannette, Pennsylvania from 1894 until around 1906. The team is best known for its role in the Latrobe Athletic Association's hiring of John Brallier, who became the first player to openly turn professional. This event occurred in 1895, a few days before Latrobe's game against Jeannette. Latrobe starting quarterback, Eddie Blair, due to a scheduling conflict could not play in the game. This led Latrobe manager, Dave Berry to hire Brallier to play against Jeannette for $10, plus expenses. Latrobe would go on to win that game 12-0.

However, Jeannette also had a rivalry with the nearby Greensburg Athletic Association. In 1894, Greensburg player, Lawson Fiscus reportedly kicked a Jeannette player in the face, however the Pittsburgh Press reported that Fiscus tripped the player and "purposely tramped on his neck." This led to Jeannette loudly petitioning the umpire to expel Fiscus from the game. Greensburg shouted just as loudly that Lawson had simply performed in the line of duty. The official was reported to have ties with Greensburg and tended to side with them. The arguments continued through halftime, which was expanded to allow for more shouting. Finally one team, or another, stormed off the field in a protest and the game was declared a scoreless draw.

Jeannette's most memorable wins came in 1900 against the Johnstown Athletic Club and in 1903 against the Steelton Athletic Club.
