= Dave Berry (American football) =

19/20th-century American football manager

- Berry in 1895

Profile
- Positions: Manager, Coach, Promotor

Personal information
- Born: May 30, 1870; Pittsburgh, Pennsylvania, U.S.
- Died: November 10, 1928 (aged 58); San Francisco, California, U.S.

Career history

Coaching
- 1898: Western Pennsylvania All-Stars

Manager
- 1895–00: Latrobe Athletic Association
- 1898: Western Pennsylvania All-Stars
- 1902: Pittsburgh Stars

Awards and highlights
- National Football League champion (1902); Co-founder of the first National Football League (1902); Inventor of the all-star game (1898); Signed first openly professional football player (1895)

David J. Berry (May 30, 1870 – November 10, 1928) was an American football manager during the late 19th and early 20th centuries. He was the top promoter for the sport during that time period. He is credited with inventing the "all-star game concept" in 1898, and also helped to form one of the first organized football leagues in 1902.

== Latrobe ==
He was the manager of the Latrobe Athletic Association the first ever fully professional football team to play an entire season. He was also signed John Brallier to the Latrobe football team in 1895, for $10 a game plus expenses, making him the first-ever openly professional football player. Outside of pro football, Berry was the editor of the Latrobe Clipper newspaper.

== All-Star game ==
Berry was also the inventor of the all-star game. In 1898, Berry organized a team of local stars to play the Duquesne Country and Athletic Club, the Pennsylvania "football champions" that season. He came up with the idea of opposing them with an all-star team culled from Latrobe, Greensburg Athletic Association, Washington & Jefferson College, the Pittsburgh Athletic Club, and Pittsburgh College of the Holy Ghost. Berry was able to form the 1898 Western Pennsylvania All-Star football team, however Greensburg and Washington & Jefferson refused to commit players, or allow them to play. Many of his players came directly from Latrobe. Still Berry's All-Star Game ended in a 16–0 Duquesne win. The game also resulted in a poor showing of attendance, with only 1,500 fans in attendance at Pittsburgh's Exposition Park. Part of the blame was due to many Pittsburghers considering the football season over with the Thanksgiving games. Uncertain weather was also blamed for the poor attendance. However most of the fans blame went to the leaders of the Greensburg Athletic Association, who were accused of spreading rumors that the various star players would not appear in the game.

Hours before the start of his all-star game, Berry was "arrested" by one of his Latrobe players for a debt he claimed Berry owed him. Berry paid the $33 owed and then had the player arrested on false arrest charges.

== NFL (1902) ==
Berry also helped form the first National Football League in 1902, with Ben Shibe and John Rogers. Shibe and Rodgers, owners of the Philadelphia Phillies and Philadelphia Athletics respectively, decided to field football teams to compete with each other during the baseball wars, that pitted the National League against the upstart American League. However both men needed to have a Pittsburgh-based team in their football league to add legitimacy to their league. So they contacted Berry who put together an all-star team of top players that were named the "Pittsburgh Stars".

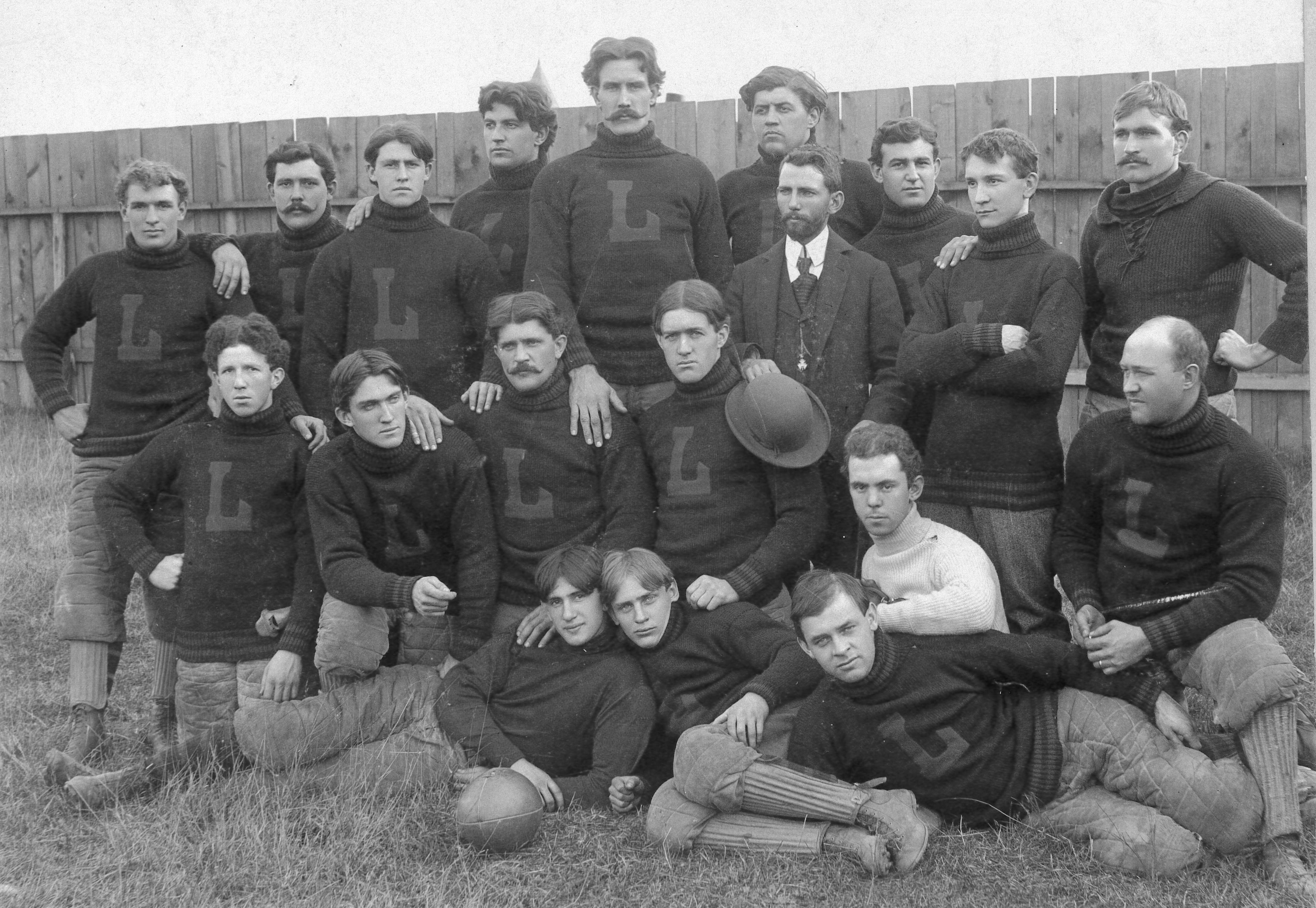
Dave Berry (wearing a suit and tie) with members of the 1897 Latrobe football team.

The Stars were owned by Berry on paper; however Barney Dreyfuss and William Chase Temple, owners of the Pittsburgh Pirates were rumoured to be funding the team. Meanwhile, Shibe and Rogers named their teams after their baseball counterparts. Berry was also named the league's president.

In the league's only season, Berry's Pittsburgh Stars defeated the Philadelphia Athletics, 11–0 at the Pittsburgh Coliseum to win the league championship. The A's players decided to call the Stars game an exhibition, and declared themselves the champs. However, the team had agreed to that season-ending championship game against Pittsburgh the Saturday after Thanksgiving Day, and they had lost it. This was recognized by all parties at the time as the championship game. Each team carried a record of 2–2 for league play. Pittsburgh had by far the better point ratio, scoring 39 points to their opponents' 22. Both the Athletics and the Phillies gave up more points than they scored in their league games. Finally Berry used his power as league president and name his Stars the 1902 champions.

== Newspaper career ==
Berry was a longtime newspaperman. He learned the business as a reporter for the daily Greensburg Press, covering the city of Jeannette in the local news. He later conducted the Latrobe Clipper and founded two papers in Greensburg, the Morning Star and Morning Review. Continuing his journalistic career in Uniontown, he purchased the weekly Genius of Liberty and daily Evening Genius and established the Morning Herald. During the later years of his life he turned his attention to labor publications, editing the National Labor Journal of Pittsburgh and the National Industrial Review of San Francisco.
