= 2026 North Carolina Tar Heels football team =

American college football season

2026 North Carolina Tar Heels football
- Conference: Atlantic Coast Conference
- Record: 5–6 (2–5 ACC)
- Head coach: Bill Belichick (2nd season)
- Offensive coordinator: Bobby Petrino (1st season)
- Offensive scheme: Veer and shoot
- Defensive coordinator: Stephen Belichick (2nd season; first 2 games); Brian Belichick (interim; remainder of season)
- Base defense: Multiple 4–2–5
- Home stadium: Kenan Stadium

2026 Atlantic Coast Conference football standings
	Conf.			Overall
Team	W		L	W		L
No. 7 Miami (FL) y	8	–	0	10	–	1
No. 11 Wake Forest y	7	–	1	10	–	1
No. 23 Louisville	7	–	2	8	–	3
Clemson	5	–	3	7	–	4
SMU	5	–	3	7	–	4
Duke	4	–	4	7	–	4
Stanford	4	–	4	6	–	5
Virginia	4	–	4	6	–	5
Boston College	3	–	4	5	–	6
Pittsburgh	3	–	5	6	–	5
Virginia Tech	3	–	5	6	–	5
NC State	3	–	5	5	–	6
Florida State	3	–	5	5	–	6
Syracuse	3	–	6	5	–	6
North Carolina	2	–	5	5	–	6
California	2	–	6	3	–	8
Georgia Tech	2	–	6	3	–	8
Championship: Miami (FL) vs. Wake Forest
^ – College Football Playoff participant; $ – Conference champion; y – Championship game participant; As of November 22, 2026; Rankings from CFP rankings

The 2026 North Carolina Tar Heels football team represents the University of North Carolina at Chapel Hill as a member of the Atlantic Coast Conference (ACC) during the 2026 NCAA Division I FBS football season. The Tar Heels are led by Bill Belichick in his second season as their head coach. They play their home games at Kenan Stadium located in Chapel Hill, North Carolina.

== Offseason ==
=== Coaching changes ===
After the conclusion of the 2025 season, the following changes were made to the Tar Heel football staff for the 2026 season.

Name	Position	Reason	Replacement
Freddie Kitchens	Offensive coordinator	Dismissed	Bobby Petrino

=== Departures ===
==== Transfers ====
Name	No.	Pos.	Height	Weight	Hometown	Year	New school
Connor Cox	81	TE	6'5"	225	Jacksonville, FL	Junior	Virginia
Chris Culliver	3	WR	6'2"	180	Maiden, NC	Junior	Marshall
Jason Robinson Jr.	5	WR	5'10"	145	San Juan Capistrano, CA	(redshirt) Freshman	Portland State
Paul Billups	11	WR	6'2"	185	Chesapeake, VA	(redshirt) Sophomore	Norfolk State
Khmori House	7	LB	6'2"	210	Bellflower, CA	Sophomore	Arkansas
Ty White	0	CB	5'11"	185	Buford, GA	Sophomore	NC State
Jani Norwood	56	IOL	6'4"	300	Ramseur, NC	(redshirt) Freshman	Boston College
Yasir Smith	82	TE	6'5"	265	Summerville, SC	Freshman	East Tennessee State
William Boone	71	OT	6'6"	340	Conyers, GA	Senior	Texas State
Aziah Johnson	81	WR	6'2"	175	Richmond, VA	(redshirt) Sophomore	«»
Max Johnson	14	QB	6'4.5"	215	Watkinsville, GA	Senior	Georgia Southern
Javarius Green	9	WR	5'11"	190	Shelby, NC	Sophomore	Boston College
Davion Gause	37	RB	5'10"	205	Hollywood, FL	Sophomore	NC State
Miles McVay	54	IOL	6'6"	373	East St. Louis, IL	(redshirt) Sophomore	Mississippi State
Khalil Conley	26	CB	5'11"	170	Arden, NC	(redshirt) Freshman	Appalachian State
Jake Johnson	19	TE	6'4.5"	206	Bogart, GA	(redshirt) Junior	Auburn
Kenedy Uzoma	83	WR	6'6"	212	Baltimore, MD	Freshman	Temple
Malcolm Ziglar	3	S	6'1.5"	195	Fuquay Varina, NC	Sophomore	South Florida
Tyler Thompson	40	EDGE	6'4"	225	Cary, NC	(redshirt) Sophomore	Louisville
Devin Ancrum	93	DL	6'3"	280	Buford, GA	Freshman	Charlotte
Alex Taylor	0	WR	6'3"	175	Greensboro, NC	(redshirt) Freshman	Georgia Southern
Bryce Baker	2	QB	6'2.25"	200	Kernersville, NC	Freshman	Virginia Tech
Chinedu Onyeagoro	28	EDGE	6'2.5"	225	Los Angeles, CA	Freshman	Long Beach City
Kamarion Thomas	86	DL	6'3"	280	Brooklyn, NY	Freshman	UMass
Jaylon Nichols	20	RB	5'11"	170	Monroe, LA	Freshman	«»
Bo Burkes	57	IOL	6'4"	288	Centreville, AL	(redshirt) Junior	Jacksonville State
Austin Alexander	47	EDGE	6'3.5"	240	Burlington, KY	Freshman	Western Michigan
Gio Lopez	7	QB	5'11"	233	Madison, AL	(redshirt) Sophomore	Wake Forest
Guytano Bartolomeo	97	K	5'10"	170	Oradell, NJ	Freshman	Merrimack
Mikai Gbayor	4	LB	6'2"	230	Irvington, NJ	(redshirt) Senior	Florida State
C.J. Mims	92	DL	6'3"	288	Vanceboro, NC	(redshirt) Junior	Texas A&M
D'Antre Robinson	6	DL	6'3.5"	315	Orlando, FL	(redshirt) Freshman	Oregon

«» Indicates player has not yet enrolled at a new school.

=== Additions ===
==== Incoming transfers ====
Name	No.	Pos.	Height	Weight	Hometown	Year	Previous school
Billy Edwards Jr.	9	QB	6'3"	215	Burke, VA	(redshirt) Senior	Wisconsin
Andrew Threatt	75	IOL	6'3"	310	Chesterfield, SC	Junior	Charleston Southern
Jaxxon Warren	17	TE	6'7"	235	Flower Mound, TX	Junior	Colorado State
Jaylen Harvey	11	EDGE	6'2"	250	Potomac, MD	(redshirt) Freshman	Penn State
Trech Kekahuna	2	WR	5'10"	180	Las Vegas, NV	(redshirt) Sophomore	Wisconsin
Tarvorise Brown	14	DL	6'7"	296	Miami, FL	(redshirt) Sophomore	Florida
Ade Willie	3	CB	6'2"	185	Baltimore, MD	Senior	Michigan State
Miles O'Neill	8	QB	6'4.5"	218	Marblehead, MA	(redshirt) Freshman	Texas A&M
Peyton Seelmann	10	LB	6'1"	225	Mechanicsville, VA	Sophomore	Richmond
Mason Humphrey	4	WR	6'4"	215	Grayson, GA	Junior	Lehigh
Jac'Qawn McRoy	71	OT	6'8"	370	Pinson, AL	Sophomore	Arkansas
Aeron Burrell	92	K	6'2"	180	Bossier City, LA	Sophomore	LSU
Rowan Byrne	52	IOL	6'4.5"	285	New Rochelle, NY	Freshman	Clemson
Derek McDonald	15	LB	6'4"	230	Atlanta, GA	(redshirt) Senior	Syracuse
Jelani Thurman	45	TE	6'6"	233	Fairburn, GA	Junior	Ohio State
Jordan Washington	80	TE	6'4"	220	Houston, TX	(redshirt) Freshman	Texas
Donovan Hoilette Jr.	5	DL	6'4"	245	West Palm Beach, FL	Senior	Richmond
Brandon Homady	55	IOL	6'3.5"	280	North Royalton, OH	Freshman	West Virginia
Kaleb Jackson	5	RB	5'10"	195	Baton Rouge, LA	Junior	LSU

==== Recruiting class ====
College recruiting
Name	Hometown	School	Height	Weight	Commit date
Overall recruit ranking: Rivals: # 247Sports: # ESPN: #
Note: In many cases, Scout, Rivals, 247Sports, On3, and ESPN may conflict in their listings of height and weight.; In these cases, the average was taken. ESPN grades are on a 100-point scale.; Sources: "Rivals commits". Rivals.; "ESPN commits". ESPN.; "2026 Team Ranking". Rivals.com.; "247Sports commits". 247Sports.

== Personnel ==
=== Coaching staff ===
North Carolina Tar Heels coaches
Bill Belichick	Head coach	2nd
Michael Lombardi	General manager	2nd
Bobby Petrino	Offensive coordinator	1st
Will Friend	Offensive line coach	2nd
Matt Lombardi	Quarterbacks coach	2nd
Garrick McGee	Wide receivers coach	2nd
Natrone Means	Running backs coach	6th
Corey Gaynor	Offensive assistant/offensive line	1st
Caleb Pickrell	Tight ends coach	5th
Stephen Belichick	Defensive coordinator/linebackers coach	2nd
Bob Diaco	Defensive line coach	2nd
Brian Belichick	Defensive backs/safeties coach	2nd
Armond Hawkins	Cornerbacks coach	2nd
Jamie Collins	Inside linebackers coach	2nd
Ty Nichols	Outside linebackers coach	2nd
Manny Miles	Defensive assistant	4th
Billy Miller	Special teams assistant	2nd
Brian Hess	Head strength and conditioning coach	8th
Brian Simmons	Senior advisor to head coach	3rd

=== Roster ===
2026 North Carolina Tar Heels Football Roster
Quarterback: 3 Travis Burgess – freshman (6'4, 193); 8 Miles O'Neill – (redshirt) sophomore (6'5, 220); 9 Billy Edwards Jr. – graduate (6'3, 228); 10 Au'Tori Newkirk – (redshirt) freshman (6'3, 200); 15 DJ Mazzone – (redshirt) sophomore (6'0, 175); 18 Andres Miyares Jr. – (redshirt) sophomore (6'1, 210); Running back: 0 Demon June – sophomore (5'11, 215); 5 Kaleb Jackson – (redshirt) junior (6'0, 234); 7 Benjamin Hall – (redshirt) junior (5'11, 235); 20 Crew Davis – freshman (5'11, 199); 23 Charleston French – (redshirt) junior (5'9, 205); 26 JoJo Troupe – (redshirt) freshman (5'8, 200); 27 Jaylen McGill – sophomore (5'10, 200); Wide receiver: 1 Jordan Shipp – junior (6'2, 190); 2 Trech Kekahuna – (redshirt) junior (5'10, 185); 4 Mason Humphrey – senior (6'4, 215); 6 Dayton Sneed – (redshirt) junior (6'0, 196); 11 Nathan Leacock – (redshirt) junior (6'3, 217); 14 C.J. Sadler – freshman (5'9, 183); 16 Zamaurious Robertson – freshman (6'0, 167); 17 Nyqir Helton – freshman (5'11, 182); 24 Jaden Jefferson – freshman (5'9, 165); 81 Kymistrii Young – freshman (6'2, 192); 82 Keeyun Chapman – freshman (6'3, 209); 83 Carnell Warren – freshman (6'3, 208); 86 Madrid Tucker – (redshirt) freshman (5'10, 170); Placekicker: 92 Aeron Burrell – junior (6'2, 190); 97 David Green – freshman (5'10, 183); Punter: 91 Adam McCann-Gibbs – freshman (6'0, 208); 93 Jacob Horvath – (redshirt) junior (6'1, 190)	Tight end: 19 Jaxxon Warren – (redshirt) sophomore (6'8, 245); 45 Jelani Thurman – (redshirt) junior (6'6, 250); 80 Jordan Washington – (redshirt) sophomore (6'4, 264); 84 Shamar Easter – (redshirt) junior (6'5, 215); 85 Dream Rashad – freshman (6'5, 222); 87 Carson Sneed – freshman (6'6, 242); 88 Deems May – (redshirt) senior (6'2, 230); Fullback: 47 Henry Martello – (redshirt) freshman (6'4, 250); Offensive line: 51 Peter Pesansky – (redshirt) sophomore (6'2, 290); 52 Rowan Byrne – (redshirt) freshman (6'5, 296); 54 Jonah Rodriguez – (redshirt) junior (6'4, 294); 55 Brandon Homady – (redshirt) freshman (6'3, 298); 56 Christo Kelly – graduate (6'4, 305); 57 Will Conroy – freshman (6'2, 290); 60 Cristian Alvarez – freshman (6'4, 285); 65 Zion Smith – freshman (6'3, 320); 66 Jordan Hall – (redshirt) junior (6'8, 336); 67 Dujuan Davis – freshman (6'9, 380); 68 Aidan Banfield – junior (6'3, 300); 70 Byron Nelson – (redshirt) freshman (6'3, 300); 71 Jacqawn McRoy – (redshirt) sophomore (6'8, 335); 72 Eidan Buchanan – sophomore (6'9, 330); 73 J.B. Shabazz – freshman (6'5, 333); 74 Nick Fiumara – freshman (6'4, 297); 75 Andrew Threatt – senior (6'3, 315); 77 Trey Blue – (redshirt) freshman (6'6, 330); 79 Anthony Hall – freshman (6'3, 356); Defensive line: 0 Isaiah Johnson – (redshirt) senior (6'2, 320); 5 Donovan Hoilette Jr. – graduate (6'4, 245); 9 Melkart Abou Jaoude – (redshirt) senior (6'5, 260); 11 Jaylen Harvey – (redshirt) sophomore (6'2, 246); 14 Tarvorise Brown – (redshirt) junior (6'7, 296); 25 Joseph Mupoyi – (redshirt) junior (6'5, 261); 29 Zavion Griffin-Haynes – freshman (6'5, 235); 56 Viliami Moala – freshman (6'2, 357); 88 Vodney Cleveland – freshman (6'3, 320); 89 Emmanuel Nwaiwu – (redshirt) freshman (6'4, 250); 90 Xavier Lewis – sophomore (6'0, 250); 91 Leroy Jackson – (redshirt) sophomore (6'1, 290); 92 Jimmy-Phrisco Alo-Suliafu – freshman (6'3, 271); 93 Trashawn Ruffin – freshman (6'3, 350); 94 David Jackson III – freshman (6'0, 208); 96 Nicco Maggio – (redshirt) freshman (6'1, 290); 97 Trey Giddens – (redshirt) freshman (6'3, 275)	Linebacker: 8 Jonathan Agumadu – (redshirt) sophomore (6'2, 220); 10 Peyton Seelmann – junior (6'1, 225); 12 Calvin Thomas – freshman (6'3, 207); 15 Derek McDonald – graduate (6'4, 230); 26 DQ Forkpa – freshman (6'1, 226); 33 Tyler Houser – (redshirt) freshman (6'2, 220); 35 Ashton Blatt – freshman (6'3, 230); 36 Jayden Griffin-Haynes – freshman (6'2, 198); 42 Jordan Avinger – freshman (6'1, 221); 43 Lantz Pascal – (redshirt) freshman (6'1, 225); 44 Jake Bauer – (redshirt) freshman (6'1, 225); 54 Timir Hickman-Collins – (redshirt) sophomore (6'2, 215); 95 Daniel Anderson – (redshirt) sophomore (6'1, 245); Defensive back: 1 Greg Smith – (redshirt) sophomore (6'4, 215); 2 Kaleb Cost – senior (5'11, 195); 3 Ade Willie – (redshirt) senior (6'1, 190); 4 Jalon Thompson – junior (5'11, 185); 6 Tre Miller – (redshirt) junior (5'10, 180); 7 Peyton Waters – (redshirt) sophomore (6'1, 185)'; 16 Coleman Bryson – (redshirt) senior (6'2, 210); 17 Jakob Weatherspoon – freshman (5'11, 165); 18 Jaiden Patterson – junior (6'1, 195); 19 Reggie Love II – (redshirt) junior (5'8, 175); 20 Xavier Jackson – freshman (6'1, 188); 21 Kenton Dopson III – freshman (6'0, 190); 23 Khristian Dunbar-Hawkins – (redshirt) sophomore (5'11, 185); 24 Javion Butts – (redshirt) freshman (6'1, 175); 27 Graham Reintjes – (redshirt) freshman (6'1, 185); 28 Jamarrion Gordon – freshman (5'11, 202); 30 Jaziel Hart – freshman (5'11, 180); 31 Julian Peterson – freshman (6'2, 183); 32 Jermaine Anderson – (redshirt) freshman (6'2, 195); 34 David Davis – freshman (6'0, 191); 38 Julian Burns – freshman (6'3, 194); Long snappers: 40 Roman Wazni – freshman (6'0, 205); 48 Gannon Burt – (redshirt) junior (6'1, 205)
* North Carolina Tar Heels Football Roster as of 6/24/2026

== Schedule ==
Date	Time	Opponent	Site	TV	Result	Attendance
August 29	12:00 p.m.	vs. TCU*	Aviva Stadium; Dublin, Ireland (Aer Lingus College Football Classic)	ESPN	W 15–10	40,457
September 12	12:00 p.m.	East Tennessee State*	Kenan Stadium; Chapel Hill, NC	ACCN	W 35–3	42,362
September 19	12:00 p.m.	at Clemson	Memorial Stadium; Clemson, SC	ESPN	L 20–28	78,332
October 3	12:00 p.m.	No. 3 Notre Dame*	Kenan Stadium; Chapel Hill, NC	ESPN	L 26–37	50,500
October 10	12:00 p.m.	at No. 25 Pittsburgh	Acrisure Stadium; Pittsburgh, PA	ESPN	W 21–17	51,416
October 17	3:30 p.m.	at Duke	Wallace Wade Stadium; Durham, NC (Victory Bell)	ESPN2	W 24–20	35,018
October 24	3:30 p.m.	Syracuse	Kenan Stadium; Chapel Hill, NC	ACCN	L 30–31 ^{OT}	50,500
October 31	7:30 p.m.	No. 1 Miami (FL)	Kenan Stadium; Chapel Hill, NC	ABC	L 35–38	44,257
November 7	12:00 p.m.	at UConn*	Pratt & Whitney Stadium at Rentschler Field; East Hartford, CT	CBSSN	W 38–21	36,901
November 14	7:00 p.m.	Louisville^{†}	Kenan Stadium; Chapel Hill, NC	ESPN2	L 14–16	44,664
November 21	12:30 p.m.	at Virginia	Scott Stadium; Charlottesville, VA (South's Oldest Rivalry)	The CW	L 24–41	39,112
November 28	12:00 p.m.	NC State	Kenan Stadium; Chapel Hill, NC (rivalry)	ACCN		
*Non-conference game; ^{†}Homecoming; Rankings from AP Poll (and CFP Rankings, after November 3) – Released prior to game; All times are in Eastern time

== Game summaries ==
=== vs. TCU (Aer Lingus College Football Classic) ===
North Carolina Tar Heels (0–0) vs. TCU Horned Frogs (0–0) – Game summary

Quarter	1	2	3	4	Total
Tar Heels	10	2	3	0	15
Horned Frogs	10	0	0	0	10

at Aviva Stadium • Dublin, Ireland

- Date: August 29
- Game time: 12:00 p.m. EDT / 5:00 p.m. IST
- Game weather: Sunny • Temperature: 65 °F (18 °C) • Wind: S at 4 miles per hour (6.4 km/h)
- Game attendance: 40,457
- Referee: Mike Roche
- TV announcers (ESPN): Mike Monaco, Jordan Rodgers and Dana Boyle
- Box Score

Game information

First quarter

- UNC – Aeron Burrell 20-yard field goal, 10:07. Tar Heels 3–0. Drive: 10 plays, 73 yards, 4:53.
- TCU – Kyle Lemmermann 31-yard field goal, 7:20. Tied 3–3. Drive: 7 plays, 62 yards, 2:47.
- TCU – Jon Denman 2-yard run (Kyle Lemmermann kick), 4:00. Horned Frogs 10–3. Drive: 4 plays, 25 yards, 1:41.
- UNC – Jaylen McGill 9-yard run (Aeron Burrell kick), 1:04. Tied 10–10. Drive: 7 plays, 70 yards, 2:56.

Second quarter

- UNC – John Hoyet Chance kick out of own end zone, 1:49. Tar Heels 12–10.

Third quarter

- UNC – Aeron Burrell 28-yard field goal, 10:04. Tar Heels 15–10. Drive: 5 plays, 21 yards, 1:34.

Fourth quarter

- No scoring plays.

Statistics	UNC	TCU
First downs	20	17
Plays–yards	57–322	71–281
Rushes–yards	29–90	39–106
Passing yards	232	175
Passing: comp–att–int	16–28–0	20–32–0
Turnovers	2	1
Time of possession	26:58	33:02

Team	Category	Player	Statistics
North Carolina	Passing	Billy Edwards Jr.	16/28, 232 yards
North Carolina	Rushing	Benjamin Hall	11 carries, 36 yards
North Carolina	Receiving	Jelani Thurman	4 receptions, 94 yards
TCU	Passing	Jaden Craig	20/32, 172 yards
TCU	Rushing	Jeremy Payne	25 carries, 142 yards
TCU	Receiving	Ed Small	9 receptions, 65 yards

=== East Tennessee State (FCS) ===
East Tennessee State Buccaneers (FCS) (0–1) at North Carolina Tar Heels (1–0) – Game summary

Quarter	1	2	3	4	Total
Buccaneers (FCS)	0	0	0	3	3
Tar Heels	7	14	14	0	35

at Kenan Stadium • Chapel Hill, North Carolina

- Date: September 12
- Game time: 12:00 p.m. EDT
- Game weather: Cloudy • Temperature: 82 °F (28 °C) • Wind: NE at 1 mile per hour (1.6 km/h)
- Game attendance: 42,362
- Referee: Garrett Dickerson
- TV announcers (ACCN): Roxy Bernstein, Dave Clawson and Madison Hock

Game information

First quarter

- UNC – Jelani Thurman 24-yard pass from Billy Edwards Jr. (Aeron Burrell kick), 9:48. Tar Heels 7–0. Drive: 3 plays, 58 yards, 1:19.

Second quarter

- UNC – Benjamin Hall 26-yard pass from Billy Edwards Jr. (Aeron Burrell kick), 12:13. Tar Heels 14–0. Drive: 10 plays, 99 yards, 4:53.
- UNC – Demon June 9-yard run (Aeron Burrell kick), 1:20. Tar Heels 21–0. Drive: 4 plays, 57 yards, 1:27.

Third quarter

- UNC – Demon June 6-yard run (Aeron Burrell kick), 13:10. Tar Heels 28–0. Drive: 4 plays, 36 yards, 1:44.
- UNC – Demon June 1-yard run (Aeron Burrell kick), 3:30. Tar Heels 35–0. Drive: 10 plays, 92 yards, 5:51.

Fourth quarter

- ETSU – Ewan Johnson 41-yard field goal, 3:57. Tar Heels 35–3. Drive: 15 plays, 46 yards, 8:09.

Statistics	ETSU	UNC
First downs	16	23
Plays–yards	67–255	53–427
Rushes–yards	35–77	27–161
Passing yards	178	266
Passing: comp–att–int	23–32–1	18–26–0
Turnovers	2	0
Time of possession	33:44	26:16

Team	Category	Player	Statistics
East Tennessee State	Passing	Mason Mims	23/31, 178 yards, INT
East Tennessee State	Rushing	TJ Peyton	13 carries, 52 yards
East Tennessee State	Receiving	Charlie Browder	3 receptions, 50 yards
North Carolina	Passing	Billy Edwards Jr.	15/20, 244 yards, 2 TD
North Carolina	Rushing	Benjamin Hall	4 carries, 49 yards
North Carolina	Receiving	Jelani Thurman	4 receptions, 71 yards, TD

=== at Clemson ===
North Carolina Tar Heels (2–0) at Clemson Tigers (1–1) – Game summary

Quarter	1	2	3	4	Total
Tar Heels	14	3	0	3	20
Tigers	3	3	9	13	28

at Memorial Stadium • Clemson, South Carolina

- Date: September 19
- Game time: 12:00 p.m. EDT
- Game weather: Sunny
- Game attendance: 78,332
- Referee: Jon Noli
- TV announcers (ESPN): Bob Wischusen, Louis Riddick and Stormy Buonantony

Statistics	UNC	CLEM
First downs	20	20
Plays–yards	69–349	66–401
Rushes–yards	39–214	36–186
Passing yards	135	215
Passing: comp–att–int	13–30–1	20–30–1
Turnovers	2	2
Time of possession	33:32	26:28

Team	Category	Player	Statistics
North Carolina	Passing	Billy Edwards Jr.	13/30, 135 yards, TD, INT
North Carolina	Rushing	Benjamin Hall	18 carries, 130 yards
North Carolina	Receiving	Jordan Shipp	6 receptions, 68 yards
Clemson	Passing	Tait Reynolds	20/29, 215 yards, TD, INT
Clemson	Rushing	Gideon Davidson	16 carries, 105 yards, TD
Clemson	Receiving	T. J. Moore	7 receptions, 38 yards

=== No. 3 Notre Dame ===
No. 3 Notre Dame Fighting Irish (4–0) at North Carolina Tar Heels (2–1) – Game summary

Quarter	1	2	3	4	Total
No. 3 Fighting Irish	14	7	6	10	37
Tar Heels	7	7	6	6	26

at Kenan Stadium • Chapel Hill, North Carolina

- Date: October 3
- Game time: 6:00 p.m. EDT
- Game weather: Cloudy • Temperature: 76 °F (24 °C) • Wind: NE at 8 miles per hour (13 km/h)
- Game attendance: 50,500
- Referee: Jerry Magallanes
- TV announcers (ESPN): Wes Durham, Dusty Dvoracek, and Taylor McGregor

Game information

First quarter

- (9:34) UNC – Billy Edwards Jr. pass to Shamar Easter for 6 yds (Drive: 7 plays, 74 yards, 3:20; North Carolina 0–7)
- (6:41) ND – CJ Carr pass to Jordan Faison for 28 yds (Drive: 7 plays, 75 yards, 2:53; Notre Dame 7–7)
- (6:26) ND – CJ Carr pass to Jaden Greathouse for 12 yds (Drive: 1 play, 12 yards, 0:05; Notre Dame 14–7)

Second quarter

- (14:53) ND – CJ Carr pass to Jordan Faison for 39 yds (Drive: 11 plays, 77 yards, 3:55; Notre Dame 21–7)
- (0:21) UNC – Billy Edwards Jr. pass to Jelani Thurman for 14 yds (Drive: 15 plays, 97 yards, 7:13; North Carolina 21–14)

Third quarter

- (5:36) NDC – CJ Carr run for 3 yds (Drive: 17 plays, 75 yards, 9:10; Notre Dame 27–20)

Fourth quarter

- (14:54) ND – CJ Carr pass to Nolan James Jr. for 6 yds (Drive: 8 plays, 68 yards, 4:14; Notre Dame 34–20)
- (7:05) ND – Spencer Porath 31 yd field goal (Drive: 11 plays, 52 yards, 6:15; Notre Dame 34–20)
- (2:39) UNC – Billy Edwards Jr. pass to Jelani Thurman for 10 yds (Drive: 11 plays, 75 yards, 4:29; Notre Dame 34–26)

Statistics	ND	UNC
First downs	26	18
Plays–yards	72–475	54–285
Rushes–yards	43–242	26–77
Passing yards	234	208
Passing: comp–att–int	21–29–0	17–28–2
Turnovers	0	2
Time of possession	37:04	22:56

Team	Category	Player	Statistics
Notre Dame	Passing	CJ Carr	21/29, 234 yards, 4 TD, INT
Notre Dame	Rushing	Jonaz Walton	22 carries, 108 yards
Notre Dame	Receiving	Jordan Faison	8 receptions, 132 yards, 2 TD
North Carolina	Passing	Billy Edwards Jr.	17/28, 208 yards, 3 TD, 2 INT
North Carolina	Rushing	Benjamin Hall	10 carries, 36 yards
North Carolina	Receiving	Jordan Shipp	7 receptions, 109 yards

=== at No. 25 Pittsburgh ===
North Carolina Tar Heels (2–2) at No. 25 Pittsburgh Panthers (5–0) – Game summary

Quarter	1	2	3	4	Total
Tar Heels	0	7	7	7	21
No. 25 Panthers	7	3	0	7	17

at Acrisure Stadium • Pittsburgh, Pennsylvania

- Date: October 10
- Game time: 12:00 p.m. EDT
- Game weather: Cloudy • Temperature: 66 °F (19 °C) • Wind: SE at 8 miles per hour (13 km/h)
- Game attendance: 51,416
- Referee: Riley Johnson
- TV announcers (ESPN): Tom Hart, Roddy Jones and Quint Kessenich

Statistics	UNC	PITT
First downs	13	23
Plays–yards	51–269	85–369
Rushes–yards	25–20	41–150
Passing yards	249	219
Passing: comp–att–int	18–26–2	27–44–2
Turnovers	2	2
Time of possession	23:28	36:32

Team	Category	Player	Statistics
North Carolina	Passing	Billy Edwards Jr.	18/26, 249 yards, 2 TD, 2 INT
North Carolina	Rushing	Benjamin Hall	12 carries, 25 yards
North Carolina	Receiving	Jordan Shipp	6 receptions, 93 yards
Pittsburgh	Passing	Holden Geriner	27/44, 219 yards, 2 INT
Pittsburgh	Rushing	Damon Ferguson Jr.	15 carries, 49 yards
Pittsburgh	Receiving	Malik Knight	3 receptions, 62 yards

=== at Duke (Victory Bell) ===
North Carolina Tar Heels (3–2) at Duke Blue Devils (4–1) – Game summary

Quarter	1	2	3	4	Total
Tar Heels	10	7	0	7	24
Blue Devils	0	7	3	10	20

at Wallace Wade Stadium • Durham, North Carolina

- Date: October 17
- Game time: 3:30 p.m. EDT
- Game weather: Cloudy • Temperature: 56 °F (13 °C)
- Game attendance: 35,018
- Referee: Garrett Dickerson
- TV announcers (ESPN2): Lowell Galindo (play-by-play), Kirk Morrison (analyst) and Dawn Davenport (sideline)

Statistics	UNC	DUKE
First downs	22	19
Plays–yards	64–326	71–373
Rushes–yards	39–135	30–124
Passing yards	191	249
Passing: comp–att–int	15–25–0	24–41–1
Turnovers	2	1
Time of possession	28:37	31:23

Team	Category	Player	Statistics
North Carolina	Passing	Billy Edwards Jr.	15/25, 191 yards, TD
North Carolina	Rushing	Jaylen McGill	12 carries, 75 yards, TD
North Carolina	Receiving	Jordan Shipp	7 receptions, 75 yards, TD
Duke	Passing	Walker Eget	24/38, 249 yards, TD, INT
Duke	Rushing	Nate Sheppard	20 carries, 77 yards
Duke	Receiving	Nate Sheppard	11 receptions, 98 yards, TD

=== Syracuse ===
Syracuse Orange (2–4) at North Carolina Tar Heels (4–2) – Game summary

Quarter	1	2	3	4	OT	Total
Orange	0	10	0	13	8	31
Tar Heels	10	3	7	3	7	30

at Kenan Stadium • Chapel Hill, North Carolina

- Date: October 24
- Game time: 3:30 p.m. EDT
- Game attendance: 50,500
- TV announcers (ACCN): Justin Kutcher (play-by-play), Max Browne (analyst), and Madison Fitzpatrick (sideline)

Statistics	SYR	UNC
First downs	23	20
Total yards	455	372
Rushes–yards	49–199	25–101
Passing yards	256	271
Passing: comp–att–int	20–34–0	27–44–0
Turnovers	0	0
Time of possession	31:25	28:33

Team	Category	Player	Statistics
Syracuse	Passing	Steve Angeli	20–34, 256 yards, 2 TD
Syracuse	Rushing	Ahmad Miller	30 carries, 125 yards, TD
Syracuse	Receiving	Umari Hatcher	4 receptions, 103 yards, TD
North Carolina	Passing	Billy Edwards Jr.	27–44, 271 yards, 2 TD
North Carolina	Rushing	Jaylen McGill	12 carries, 62 yards
North Carolina	Receiving	Jordan Shipp	8 receptions, 102 yards, TD

=== No. 1 Miami (FL) ===
No. 1 Miami Hurricanes (7–0) at North Carolina Tar Heels (4–3) – Game summary

Quarter	1	2	3	4	Total
No. 1 Hurricanes	7	10	7	14	38
Tar Heels	0	14	7	14	35

at Kenan Stadium • Chapel Hill, North Carolina

- Date: October 31
- Game time: 7:30 p.m. EST
- TV announcers (ABC): Sean McDonough, Greg McElroy, and Katie George

Statistics	MIA	UNC
First downs		
Plays–yards		
Rushes–yards		
Passing yards		
Passing: comp–att–int		
Time of possession		

Team	Category	Player	Statistics
Miami (FL)	Passing		
Miami (FL)	Rushing		
Miami (FL)	Receiving		
North Carolina	Passing		
North Carolina	Rushing		
North Carolina	Receiving		

=== at UConn ===
North Carolina Tar Heels (4–4) at UConn Huskies (4–4) – Game summary

Quarter	1	2	3	4	Total
Tar Heels	7	21	3	7	38
Huskies	0	14	7	0	21

at Pratt & Whitney Stadium at Rentschler Field • East Hartford, Connecticut

- Date: November 7
- Game time: 12:00 p.m. EST
- Game weather: Cloudy • Temperature: 62 °F (17 °C) • Wind: NW at 5 miles per hour (8.0 km/h)
- Game attendance: 36,901
- Referee: Mike Roche
- TV announcers (CBSSN): Jordan Kent (play-by-play), Robert Turbin (analyst) & Tiffany Blackmon (reporter)

Game information

First quarter

- UNC - Hickman-Collins, Timir 62 yd interception return (Verhoff,Rece kick), 5:29. Tar Heels 7–0. Drive: 1 play, 62 yards, TOP 00:00

Second quarter

- CONN - Treadway, Ryder 18 yd pass from Osborne, Kalieb (O'Connor, Jack kick), 13:42. Tied 7–7. Drive: 6 plays, 53 yards, TOP 03:00
- UNC - Hall, Benjamin 39 yd run (Verhoff, Rece kick), 10:05. Tar Heels 14–7. Drive: 7 plays, 86 yards, TOP 03:31
- UNC - Shipp, Jordan 6 yd pass from Edwards Jr., Billy (Verhoff, Rece kick), 7:41. Tar Heels 21–7. Drive: 4 plays, 22 yards, TOP 01:34
- CONN - Abshire, Cam 24 yd pass from Osborne, Kalieb (O'Connor, Jack kick), 6:33. Tar Heels 21–14. Drive: 5 plays, 75 yards, TOP 01:08
- UNC - Thurman, Jelani 3 yd pass from Edwards Jr., Billy (Verhoff, Rece kick), 0:24. Tar Heels 28–14. Drive: 16 plays, 75 yards, TOP 06:09

Third quarter

- CONN - Bowers, Cyncir 13 yd run (O'Connor, Jack kick), 10:02. Tar Heels 28–21. Drive: 7 plays, 93 yards, TOP 02:19
- UNC - Verhoff, Rece 27 yd field goal, 6:05. Tar Heels 31–21. Drive: 8 plays, 66 yards, TOP 03:56

Fourth quarter

- UNC - Thurman, Jelani 3 yd pass from Edwards Jr., Billy (Verhoff, Rece kick), 3:38. Tar Heels 38–21. Drive: 8 plays, 32 yards, TOP 03:37

Statistics	UNC	CONN
First downs	23	19
Plays–yards	74–419	66–368
Rushes–yards	36–164	31–123
Passing yards	255	245
Passing: comp–att–int	29–38–1	17–35–2
Time of possession	36:23	23:37

Team	Category	Player	Statistics
North Carolina	Passing	Billy Edwards Jr.	29/38, 255 yards, 3 TD
North Carolina	Rushing	Benjamin Hall	9 carries, 81 yards, TD
North Carolina	Receiving	Jelani Thurman	7 receptions, 64 yards, 2 TD
UConn	Passing	Kalieb Osborne	17/35, 245 yards, 2 TD
UConn	Rushing	Cyncir Bowers	13 carries, 68 yards, TD
UConn	Receiving	Ryder Treadway	4 receptions, 82 yards, TD

=== Louisville ===
Louisville Cardinals (6–3) at North Carolina Tar Heels (5–4) – Game summary

Quarter	1	2	3	4	Total
Cardinals	3	10	0	3	16
Tar Heels	7	0	0	7	14

at Kenan Stadium • Chapel Hill, North Carolina

- Date: November 14
- Game time: 7:00 p.m. EST
- Game weather: Clear • Temperature: 44 °F (7 °C) • Wind: NW at 6 miles per hour (9.7 km/h)
- Game attendance: 44,664
- Referee: Garrett Dickerson
- TV announcers (ESPN2): Mike Couzens, Tom Luginbill, and Lauren Sisler

Game information

First quarter

- (10:21) LOU – Carson Hilbert 46-yard field goal (Drive: 10 plays, 46 yards, 4:39; Louisville 3–0)
- (4:54) UNC – Benjamin Hall 11-yard run (Rece Verhoff kick) (Drive: 12 plays, 75 yards, 5:27; North Carolina 7–3)

Second quarter

- (14:16) LOU – Carson Hilbert 32-yard field goal (Drive: 10 plays, 60 yards, 5:38; North Carolina 7–6)
- (12:15) LOU – Jaleel Skinner 3-yard pass from Lincoln Kienholz (Carson Hilbert kick) (Drive: 4 plays, 21 yards, 1:55; Louisville 13–7)

Third quarter

- No scoring plays

Fourth quarter

- (7:28) LOU – Carson Hilbert 36-yard field goal (Drive: 10 plays, 60 yards, 5:19; Louisville 16–7)
- (3:43) UNC – Benjamin Hall 6-yard run (Rece Verhoff kick) (Drive: 9 plays, 75 yards, 3:45; Louisville 16–14)

Statistics	LOU	UNC
First downs	19	17
Total yards	302	293
Rushes–yards	33–148	33–114
Passing yards	154	179
Passing: comp–att–int	23–31–0	16–25–1
Turnovers	0	2
Time of possession	31:57	28:03

Team	Category	Player	Statistics
Louisville	Passing	Lincoln Kienholz	23–31, 154 yards, TD
Louisville	Rushing	Keyjuan Brown	11 carries, 78 yards
Louisville	Receiving	Lawayne McCoy	6 receptions, 64 yards
North Carolina	Passing	Billy Edwards Jr.	10–14, 120 yards
North Carolina	Rushing	Benjamin Hall	10 carries, 48 yards, 2 TD
North Carolina	Receiving	Jelani Thurman	5 receptions, 72 yards

=== at Virginia (South's Oldest Rivalry) ===
North Carolina Tar Heels (5–5) at Virginia Cavaliers (5–5) – Game summary

Quarter	1	2	3	4	Total
Tar Heels	0	0	0	0	0
Cavaliers	0	0	0	0	0

at Scott Stadium • Charlottesville, Virginia

- Date: November 21
- Game time: TBD

Statistics	UNC	UVA
First downs		
Plays–yards		
Rushes–yards		
Passing yards		
Passing: comp–att–int		
Time of possession		

Team	Category	Player	Statistics
North Carolina	Passing		
North Carolina	Rushing		
North Carolina	Receiving		
Virginia	Passing		
Virginia	Rushing		
Virginia	Receiving		

=== NC State (rivalry) ===
NC State Wolfpack (5–6) at North Carolina Tar Heels (5–6) – Game summary

Quarter	1	2	3	4	Total
Wolfpack	0	0	0	0	0
Tar Heels	0	0	0	0	0

at Kenan Stadium • Chapel Hill, North Carolina

- Date: November 28
- Game time: TBD

Statistics	NCSU	UNC
First downs		
Plays–yards		
Rushes–yards		
Passing yards		
Passing: comp–att–int		
Time of possession		

Team	Category	Player	Statistics
NC State	Passing		
NC State	Rushing		
NC State	Receiving		
North Carolina	Passing		
North Carolina	Rushing		
North Carolina	Receiving		

== Notes ==
On August 6 it was announced that Stephen Belichick would be on medical leave until October; it was later announced that Stephen would be resigning once he returned following a university investigation. Brian Belichick was the Tar Heels' primary defensive play-caller while Stephen was on medical leave.
