= 2025 North Carolina Tar Heels football team =

American college football season

2025 North Carolina Tar Heels football
- Conference: Atlantic Coast Conference
- Record: 4–8 (2–6 ACC)
- Head coach: Bill Belichick (1st season)
- Offensive coordinator: Freddie Kitchens (1st season)
- Offensive scheme: Multiple pro-style
- Defensive coordinator: Stephen Belichick (1st season)
- Base defense: Multiple 4–2–5
- Home stadium: Kenan Stadium

2025 Atlantic Coast Conference football standings
| | Conf. | | | Overall |
| Team | W | | L | W | | L |
|---|---|---|---|---|---|---|
| No. 16 Virginia y | 7 | – | 1 | 11 | – | 3 |
| Duke y$ | 6 | – | 2 | 9 | – | 5 |
| No. 2 Miami (FL) ^ | 6 | – | 2 | 13 | – | 3 |
| Georgia Tech | 6 | – | 2 | 9 | – | 4 |
| SMU | 6 | – | 2 | 9 | – | 4 |
| Pittsburgh | 6 | – | 2 | 8 | – | 5 |
| Louisville | 4 | – | 4 | 9 | – | 4 |
| Wake Forest | 4 | – | 4 | 9 | – | 4 |
| NC State | 4 | – | 4 | 8 | – | 5 |
| California | 4 | – | 4 | 7 | – | 6 |
| Clemson | 4 | – | 4 | 7 | – | 6 |
| Stanford | 3 | – | 5 | 4 | – | 8 |
| Florida State | 2 | – | 6 | 5 | – | 7 |
| Virginia Tech | 2 | – | 6 | 3 | – | 9 |
| North Carolina | 2 | – | 6 | 4 | – | 8 |
| Boston College | 1 | – | 7 | 2 | – | 10 |
| Syracuse | 1 | – | 7 | 3 | – | 9 |
Championship: Duke 27, Virginia 20^{OT}
^ – College Football Playoff participant; $ – Conference champion; y – Championship game participant; As of October 26, 2026; Rankings from AP Poll

The 2025 North Carolina Tar Heels football team represented the University of North Carolina at Chapel Hill as a member of the Atlantic Coast Conference (ACC) during the 2025 NCAA Division I FBS football season. The Tar Heels were led by first-year head coach Bill Belichick. The team plays their home games at Kenan Stadium.

Following the firing of head coach Mack Brown after six seasons in charge, assistant Freddie Kitchens was elevated to interim head coach.

On December 11, 2024, Bill Belichick, former head coach of the NFL's New England Patriots, was hired as the 35th head coach in North Carolina program history.

The North Carolina Tar Heels drew an average home attendance of 50,500.

== Offseason ==
=== Coaching changes ===
After the conclusion of the 2024 season, the following changes were made to the Tar Heel football staff for the 2025 season.

| Name | Position | Reason | Replacement |
|---|---|---|---|
| Mack Brown | Head coach | Dismissed | Bill Belichick |
| Chip Lindsey | Offensive coordinator/quarterbacks coach | Hired by Michigan | Freddie Kitchens; Matt Lombardi |
| Randy Clements | Offensive line coach | Hired by TCU | Will Friend |
| Lonnie Galloway | Assistant head coach/Pass Game coordinator/Wide receivers coach | Hired by Clemson | Garrick McGee |
| Larry Porter | Special Teams coordinator/Running backs coach | Hired by West Virginia | Mike Priefer; Natrone Means |
| Geoff Collins | Defensive coordinator | Dismissed | Stephen Belichick |
| Charlton Warren | Assistant head coach/Defensive backs coach | Hired by NC State | Brian Belichick |
| Tommy Thigpen | Co-defensive coordinator/Inside Linebackers coach | Dismissed | Jamie Collins |
| Ted Monachino | Defensive line coach | Hired by Maryland | Bob Diaco |
| Jason Jones | Cornerbacks coach | Hired by Alabama | Armond Hawkins |
| Clyde Christensen | Offensive Analyst | Hired by Appalachian State | N/A |

Matt Lombardi will receive title of Quarterbacks coach, Kitchens' title will be solely Offensive Coordinator.
McGee's title will be solely Wide receivers coach.
Collins's title will be solely Inside Linebackers coach.

=== Departures ===
==== NFL draft ====
The following Tar Heels were selected in the 2025 NFL draft.

| Round | Pick | Player | Position | NFL team |
|---|---|---|---|---|
| 1 | 22 | Omarion Hampton | RB | Los Angeles Chargers |

==== Transfers ====
| Name | No. | Pos. | Height | Weight | Hometown | Year | New school |
|---|---|---|---|---|---|---|---|
| Eli Sutton | 73 | OT | 6'7.5" | 285 | Brentwood, TN | (redshirt) Junior | Austin Peay |
| Jordan Louie | 34 | RB | 6'0" | 205 | Lawrenceville, GA | (redshirt) Freshman | Coffeyville CC |
| Conner Harrell | 15 | QB | 6'1" | 191 | Alabaster, AL | (redshirt) Sophomore | Charlotte |
| Andrew Rosinski | 65 | OT | 6'6" | 265 | Ball Ground, GA | Freshman | Georgia Tech |
| Zach Greenberg | 63 | IOL | 6'4" | 290 | Livingston, NJ | Graduate | James Madison |
| Travis Shaw | 4 | DL | 6'5.5" | 355 | Greensboro, NC | Junior | Texas |
| Howard Sampson | 79 | OT | 6'8" | 330 | Humble, TX | (redshirt) Sophomore | Texas Tech |
| Noah Burnette | 98 | K | 5'10" | 175 | Raleigh, NC | Graduate | Notre Dame |
| Jakiah Leftwich | 75 | OT | 6'6" | 302 | Atlanta, GA | (redshirt) Junior | UCF |
| Garrett Jordan | 43 | LS | 6'0" | 225 | Waxhaw, NC | Junior | «» |
| Malik McGowan | 64 | IOL | 6'3" | 330 | Charlotte, NC | Senior | UNLV |
| Tyrane Stewart | 9 | CB | 6'0" | 180 | Osyka, MS | Junior | North Texas |
| Michael Merdinger | 17 | QB | 6'1.5" | 195 | Deerfield Beach, FL | Freshman | Liberty |
| Ashton Woods | 25 | LB | 6'3" | 205 | Marietta, GA | Freshman | West Virginia |
| Caleb LaVallee | 34 | LB | 6'1" | 205 | Mableton, GA | (redshirt) Freshman | Florida State |
| DeAndre Boykins | 16 | CB | 5'11" | 210 | Concord, NC | Senior | Oklahoma State |
| Jacolby Criswell | 12 | QB | 6'0" | 220 | Morrilton, AR | Graduate | East Tennessee State |
| Zion Ferguson | 8 | CB | 6'0" | 165 | Gainesville, GA | Freshman | Pittsburgh |
| Beau Atkinson | 12 | EDGE | 6'6" | 240 | Raleigh, NC | (redshirt) Junior | Ohio State |
| Cade Law | 55 | LB | 6'1" | 225 | Kingston Springs, TN | (redshirt) Sophomore | Memphis |
| Malaki Hamrick | 24 | LB | 6'4" | 205 | Shelby, NC | (redshirt) Sophomore | «» |
| Crews Law | 44 | LB | 6'1" | 217 | Nashville, TN | Freshman | Memphis |
| Zach Rice | 55 | OT | 6'5" | 290 | Lynchburg, VA | (redshirt) Sophomore | Syracuse |
| Lucas Osada | 97 | K | 6'1" | 190 | Woodberry Forest, VA | Freshman | Illinois |
| Gavin Blackwell | 2 | WR | 6'0" | 185 | Monroe, NC | (redshirt) Junior | Florida State |
| Jaffer Murphy | - | K | 6'1" | 183 | Marion, IA | Senior | UTSA |
| Christian Hamilton | 7 | WR | 5'11" | 167 | Harrisburg, NC | (redshirt) Freshman | West Virginia |
| Joel Starlings | 94 | DL | 6'5" | 310 | Richmond, VA | (redshirt) Freshman | Maryland |
| Julien Randolph | 80 | TE | 6'5" | 210 | Ashburn, VA | (redshirt) Freshman | Austin Peay |
| Adam Samaha | - | K | 6'0" | 170 | Ann Arbor, MI | Junior | Akron |
| Desmond Jackson | 74 | IOL | 6'4" | 285 | Clemmons, NC | Freshman | Coastal Carolina |
| Blaine McClure | 36 | DB | 6'1" | 185 | Greenwich, CT | Freshman | Vanderbilt |
| Cyrus Rogers | 84 | WR | 5'11" | 185 | Raleigh, NC | Junior | «» |
| Liam Boyd | 37 | K | 6'1" | 200 | Asheville, NC | Sophomore | Charlotte |
| CJ Murphy | 47 | LB | 6'2" | 240 | Bryn Mawr, PA | Sophomore | «» |
| Grady Sherrill | 85 | WR | 5'9" | 180 | Greensboro, NC | Sophomore | «» |
| Hudson Wilharm | 19 | QB | 6'5" | 195 | Wilmington, NC | Freshman | NC State |
| Terry Nwabuisi-Ezeala | - | DL | 6'2" | 305 | Rabun Gap, GA | Freshman | Vanderbilt |
| Hayes Galloway | 77 | IOL | 6'4" | 305 | Concord, NC | Freshman | Clemson |
| Miles Gaddy | 27 | S | 6'1" | 175 | Fuquay-Varina, NC | Sophomore | East Carolina |
| Amare Campbell | 17 | LB | 5'11" | 225 | Manassas, VA | Junior | Penn State |
| Michael Short | 30 | LB | 6'3" | 218 | Charlotte, NC | Sophomore | Wake Forest |
| Michael Hall | 27 | WR | 6'0.5" | 180 | Eden, NC | Sophomore | «» |
| Grant Mills | 61 | LS | 5'11" | 210 | Mooresville, NC | Freshman | Ohio State |
| Evan Haynes | - | WR | 6'3" | 185 | Roswell, GA | Freshman | Georgia Tech |
| Jariel Cobb | - | RB | 5'10" | 185 | Reidsville, NC | Freshman | Charlotte |
| Curtis Simpson | 33 | EDGE | 6'3.5" | 200 | Kings Mountain, NC | Freshman | Charlotte |
| Ryan Ward | 16 | TE | 6'4" | 230 | Rutherford, NJ | Freshman | West Virginia |
| Rodney Lora | 92 | DL | 6'3" | 295 | Woodberry Forest, VA | (redshirt) Freshman | UCF |
| Jason Smith | 67 | OL | 6'3" | 310 | Wilmington, NC | Freshman | Richmond |

«» Indicates player has not yet enrolled at a new school.

=== Additions ===
==== Incoming transfers ====
| Name | No. | Pos. | Height | Weight | Hometown | Year | Previous school |
|---|---|---|---|---|---|---|---|
| Christo Kelly | 53 | IOL | 6'4" | 305 | Wilmette, IL | (redshirt) Senior | Holy Cross |
| Melkart Abou Jaoude | 9 | DL | 6'5" | 260 | Newton, NJ | Junior | Delaware |
| Connor Cox | 81 | TE | 6'5 | 225 | Jacksonville, FL | Sophomore | South Carolina |
| C.J. Mims | 92 | DL | 6'3" | 288 | Vanceboro, NC | (redshirt) Sophomore | East Carolina |
| Miles McVay | 54 | IOL | 6'6" | 373 | East Saint Louis, IL | (redshirt) Freshman | Alabama |
| Chad Lindberg | 69 | IOL | 6'6" | 325 | League City, TX | Senior | Rice |
| Aziah Johnson‡ | 81 | WR | 6'2" | 175 | Richmond, VA | (redshirt) Freshman | Michigan State |
| Khmori House | 7 | LB | 6'2" | 210 | Bellflower, CA | Freshman | Washington |
| William Boone‡ | 71 | OT | 6'6" | 340 | Conyers, GA | Junior | Prairie View A&M |
| Gavin Gibson | 5 | CB | 5'11" | 175 | Mooresville, NC | Junior | East Carolina |
| Pryce Yates‡ | 10 | EDGE | 6'3" | 240 | San Antonio, TX | (redshirt) Junior | UConn |
| Coleman Bryson | 16 | S | 6'2" | 190 | Rabun Gap, GA | Junior | Minnesota |
| Jason Robinson | 5 | WR | 5'10" | 145 | San Juan Capistrano, CA | Freshman | Washington |
| Peyton Waters | 17 | S | 6'2" | 170 | Los Angeles, CA | Freshman | Washington |
| Thaddeus Dixon | 1 | CB | 6'0" | 205 | Paramount, CA | Senior | Washington |
| Daniel King | 52 | OT | 6'5" | 270 | Cairo, GA | (redshirt) Senior | Troy |
| Smith Vilbert | 8 | EDGE | 6'6" | 282 | Montvale, NJ | (redshirt) Senior | Penn State |
| Mikai Gbayor | 4 | LB | 6'2" | 230 | Irvington, NJ | (redshirt) Senior | Missouri |
| Adrian Wilson | 17 | WR | 6'1" | 170 | Pflugerville, TX | Freshman | Colorado |
| Jacob Horvath | 93 | P | 6'1" | 190 | Melbourne, Victoria, Australia | Sophomore | Eastern Illinois |
| Rece Verhoff | 90 | K | 5'11" | 189 | Columbus Grove, OH | Junior | Marshall |
| Gio Lopez | 7 | QB | 5'11.5" | 233 | Madison, AL | (redshirt) Sophomore | South Alabama |
| Benjamin Hall | 28 | RB | 5'11" | 224 | Kennesaw, GA | Sophomore | Michigan |
| Dayton Sneed | 6 | WR | 6'0" | 196 | Hermitage, TN | (redshirt) Freshman | Tennessee |
| Jordan Hall | 66 | OT | 6'8" | 336 | Columbus, OH | (redshirt) Freshman | UAB |
| Joseph Mupoyi | 25 | EDGE | 6'5" | 261 | Oakdale, CT | (redshirt) Freshman | Penn State |
| D'antre Robinson | 6 | DL | 6'3.5" | 315 | Orlando, FL | Freshman | Florida |
| Isaiah Johnson | 94 | DL | 6'2" | 275 | Chandler, AZ | (redshirt) Sophomore | Arizona |
| Gannon Burt | 48 | LS | 6'1" | 205 | Fort Mill, SC | (redshirt) Freshman | Florida |
| Will O'Steen | 73 | OT | 6'3" | 230 | Anniston, AL | (redshirt) Junior | Jacksonville State |
| Jakai Moore | 55 | IOL | 6'6" | 318 | Nokesville, VA | (redshirt) Senior | South Carolina |
| Khristian Dunbar-Hawkins | 23 | S | 5'10.5" | 185 | Tustin, CA | Freshman | UCLA |
| Greg Smith | 12 | DB | 6'4" | 215 | Riverview, FL | (redshirt) Freshman | Florida |
| Andrew Simpson | 2 | LB | 6'0" | 238 | Wilder Ave, CA | (redshirt) Senior | Boise State |
| Shamar Easter | 84 | TE | 6'5" | 215 | Ashdown, AR | (redshirt) Sophomore | Arkansas |
| Jordan Owens | 80 | TE | 6'6" | 255 | McGehee, AR | Senior | Oklahoma State |
| Nathan Leacock | 82 | WR | 6'3" | 217 | Rolesville, NC | (redshirt) Sophomore | Purdue |

‡ Departed team mid-season.

==== Recruiting class ====
College recruiting
| Name | Hometown | School | Height | Weight | Commit date |
|---|---|---|---|---|---|
Overall recruit ranking: Rivals: # 247Sports: # ESPN: #
Note: In many cases, Scout, Rivals, 247Sports, On3, and ESPN may conflict in their listings of height and weight.; In these cases, the average was taken. ESPN grades are on a 100-point scale.; Sources: "Rivals commits". Rivals.; "ESPN commits". ESPN.; "2025 Team Ranking". Rivals.com.; "247Sports commits". 247Sports.

== Personnel ==
=== Coaching staff ===
North Carolina Tar Heels coaches
| Bill Belichick | Head coach | 1st |
| Michael Lombardi | General manager | 1st |
| Freddie Kitchens | Offensive coordinator | 3rd |
| Will Friend | Offensive line coach | 1st |
| Matt Lombardi | Quarterbacks coach | 1st |
| Garrick McGee | Wide receivers coach | 1st |
| Natrone Means | Running backs coach | 5th |
| Caleb Pickrell | Offensive assistant | 4th |
| Stephen Belichick | Defensive coordinator/linebackers coach | 1st |
| Bob Diaco | Defensive line coach | 1st |
| Brian Belichick | Safeties coach | 1st |
| Armond Hawkins | Cornerbacks coach | 1st |
| Jamie Collins | Inside linebackers coach | 1st |
| Ty Nichols | Outside linebackers coach | 1st |
| Mike Priefer | Special teams coordinator | 1st |
| Billy Miller | Special teams assistant | 1st |
| Brian Hess | Head strength and conditioning coach | 7th |
| Brian Simmons | Senior advisor to head coach | 2nd |

=== Roster ===
2025 North Carolina Tar Heels Football Roster
| Quarterback: 2 Bryce Baker – freshman (6'3, 205); 7 Gio Lopez – (redshirt) sophomore (6'0, 203); 10 Au'Tori Newkirk – freshman (6'3, 200); 14 Max Johnson – graduate (6'5, 225); 15 DJ Mazzone – sophomore (6'0, 175); 18 Andres Miyares Jr. – (redshirt) freshman (6'1, 210); Running back: 12 Demon June – freshman (5'11, 215); 20 Jaylon Nichols – freshman (6'0, 185); 23 Charleston French – (redshirt) sophomore (5'9, 205); 26 JoJo Troupe – freshman (5'8, 200); 27 Jaylen McGill – freshman (5'10, 200); 28 Benjamin Hall – (redshirt) sophomore (5'11, 235); 37 Davion Gause – sophomore (5'11, 215); Wide receiver: 0 Alex Taylor – (redshirt) freshman (6'2, 190); 1 Jordan Shipp – sophomore (6'2, 190); 3 Chris Culliver – junior (6'2, 195); 5 Jason Robinson Jr. – (redshirt) freshman (5'10, 150); 6 Dayton Sneed – (redshirt) sophomore (6'0, 196); 8 Kobe Paysour – (redshirt) senior (6'1, 190); 9 Javarius Green – (redshirt) freshman (5'10, 195); 17 Adrian Wilson – freshman (6'1, 170); 82 Nathan Leacock – (redshirt) sophomore (6'3, 217); 83 Kenedy Uzoma – freshman (6'5, 210); 85 Shanard Clower – freshman (5'9, 165); 86 Madrid Tucker – freshman (5'10, 170); Placekicker: 90 Rece Verhoff – senior (5'11, 190); 97 Guytano Bartolomeo – freshman (5'10, 170); Punter: 93 Jacob Horvath – junior (6'1, 190); 96 Tom Maginness – senior (6'0, 210) | Tight end: 19 Jake Johnson – (redshirt) junior (6'6, 240); 80 Jordan Owens – senior (6'6, 255); 81 Connor Cox – (redshirt) sophomore (6'6, 250); 84 Shamar Easter – (redshirt) sophomore (6'5, 215); 87 Cort Halsey – (redshirt) sophomore (6'3, 230); 88 Deems May – (redshirt) junior (6'2, 230); 89 Paul Barton – graduate (6'4, 210); Fullback: 33 Henry Martello – freshman (6'4, 250); Offensive line: 51 Peter Pesansky – (redshirt) freshman (6'2, 290); 52 Daniel King – (redshirt) senior (6'5, 340); 53 Christo Kelly – (redshirt) senior (6'4, 305); 54 Miles McVay – (redshirt) sophomore (6'6, 350); 55 Jakai Moore – (redshirt) senior (6'6, 318); 56 Jani Norwood – (redshirt) freshman (6'4, 290); 57 Bo Burkes – (redshirt) junior (6'2, 305); 58 Austin Blaske – graduate (6'5, 310); 66 Jordan Hall – (redshirt) sophomore (6'8, 336); 68 Aidan Banfield – sophomore (6'3, 300); 69 Chad Lindberg – (redshirt) senior (6'6, 315); 70 Byron Nelson – freshman (6'3, 300); 72 Eidan Buchanan – freshman (6'9, 330); 73 Will O'Steen – (redshirt) senior (6'3, 290); 77 Trey Blue – freshman (6'6, 330); Defensive line: 6 D'Antre Robinson – sophomore (6'4, 315); 8 Smith Vilbert – (redshirt) senior (6'6, 282); 9 Melkart Abou Jaoude – (redshirt) junior (6'5, 260); 25 Joseph Mupoyi – (redshirt) freshman (6'5, 261); 84 Laderion Williams – freshman (6'4, 310); 86 Kamarion Thomas – freshman (6'3, 280); 87 Trey Giddens – freshman (6'3, 275); 89 Emmanuel Nwaiwu – freshman (6'4, 250); 90 Xavier Lewis – freshman (6'0, 250); 91 Leroy Jackson – (redshirt) freshman (6'1, 290); 92 CJ Mims – junior (6'5, 280); 93 Devin Ancrum – freshman (6'2, 295); 94 Isaiah Johnson – (redshirt) junior (6'2, 320); 96 Nicco Maggio – freshman (6'1, 290) | Linebacker: 2 Andrew Simpson – (redshirt) senior (6'0, 238); 4 Mikai Gbayor – graduate (6'2, 230); 7 Khmori House – sophomore (6'0, 215); 28 Chinedu Onyeagoro – freshman (6'2, 220); 30 Evan Bennett – (redshirt) freshman (6'2, 230); 33 Tyler Houser – freshman (6'2, 220); 40 Tyler Thompson – (redshirt) sophomore (6'4, 240); 41 Jonathan Agumadu – (redshirt) freshman (6'2, 220); 43 Lantz Pascal – freshman (6'1, 225); 44 Jake Bauer – freshman (6'1, 225); 47 Austin Alexander – freshman (6'3, 240); 54 Timir Hickman-Collins – (redshirt) freshman (6'2, 215); 95 Daniel Anderson – (redshirt) freshman (6'1, 245); Defensive back: 0 Ty White – sophomore (5'10, 185); 1 Thaddeus Dixon – (redshirt) senior (6'1, 195); 3 Malcolm Ziglar – sophomore (6'3, 195); 5 Gavin Gibson – (redshirt) senior (6'0, 185); 11 Ty Adams – (redshirt) sophomore (5'11, 180); 12 Greg Smith – (redshirt) freshman (6'4, 215); 15 Tre Miller – (redshirt) sophomore (5'10, 180); 16 Coleman Bryson – (redshirt) junior (6'2, 210); 17 Peyton Waters – sophomore (6'1, 185)'; 18 Jaiden Patterson – sophomore (6'1, 195); 19 Reggie Love II – (redshirt) sophomore (5'8, 175); 20 Jalon Thompson – sophomore (5'11, 185); 21 Kaleb Cost – junior (5'11, 195); 23 Khristian Dunbar-Hawkins – (redshirt) freshman (5'11, 185); 24 Javion Butts – freshman (6'1, 175); 26 Khalil Conley – (redshirt) freshman (5'11, 185); 27 Graham Reintjes – freshman (6'1, 185); 29 Marcus Allen – senior (6'2, 190); 31 Will Hardy – senior (6'2, 205); 32 Jermaine Anderson – freshman (6'2, 195); Long snappers: 42 Spencer Triplett – graduate (6'1, 240); 48 Gannon Burt – (redshirt) sophomore (6'1, 205) |
* North Carolina Tar Heels Football Roster as of 6/23/2026

== Schedule ==
| Date | Time | Opponent | Site | TV | Result | Attendance |
|---|---|---|---|---|---|---|
| September 1 | 8:00 p.m. | TCU* | Kenan Stadium; Chapel Hill, NC | ESPN | L 14–48 | 50,500 |
| September 6 | 7:00 p.m. | at Charlotte* | Jerry Richardson Stadium; Charlotte, NC | ESPN+ | W 20–3 | 19,233 |
| September 13 | 3:30 p.m. | Richmond* | Kenan Stadium; Chapel Hill, NC | ACCN | W 41–6 | 50,500 |
| September 20 | 3:30 p.m. | at UCF* | Acrisure Bounce House; Orlando, FL | FOX | L 9–34 | 44,206 |
| October 4 | 12:00 p.m. | Clemson | Kenan Stadium; Chapel Hill, NC | ESPN | L 10–38 | 50,500 |
| October 17 | 10:30 p.m. | at California | California Memorial Stadium; Berkeley, CA | ESPN | L 18–21 | 33,401 |
| October 25 | 12:00 p.m. | No. 16 Virginia | Kenan Stadium; Chapel Hill, NC (South's Oldest Rivalry) | ACCN | L 16–17 ^{OT} | 50,500 |
| October 31 | 7:30 p.m. | at Syracuse | JMA Wireless Dome; Syracuse, NY | ESPN | W 27–10 | 37,184 |
| November 8 | 4:30 p.m. | Stanford^{†} | Kenan Stadium; Chapel Hill, NC | The CW | W 20–15 | 50,500 |
| November 15 | 4:30 p.m. | at Wake Forest | Allegacy Federal Credit Union Stadium; Winston-Salem, NC (rivalry) | The CW | L 12–28 | 32,390 |
| November 22 | 3:30 p.m. | Duke | Kenan Stadium; Chapel Hill, NC (Victory Bell) | ACCN | L 25–32 | 50,500 |
| November 29 | 7:30 p.m. | at NC State | Carter–Finley Stadium; Raleigh, NC (rivalry) | ACCN | L 19–42 | 56,919 |
*Non-conference game; ^{†}Homecoming; Rankings from Coaches' Poll released prior to the game; All times are in Eastern time; Source:

== Game summaries ==
=== vs TCU ===
TCU Horned Frogs (0–0) at North Carolina Tar Heels (0–0) – Game summary

| Quarter | 1 | 2 | 3 | 4 | Total |
|---|---|---|---|---|---|
| Horned Frogs | 7 | 13 | 21 | 7 | 48 |
| Tar Heels | 7 | 0 | 7 | 0 | 14 |

at Kenan Stadium • Chapel Hill, North Carolina

- Date: September 1
- Game time: 8:00 p.m.
- Game weather: Clear • Temperature: 70 °F (21 °C) • Wind: NE at 6 miles per hour (9.7 km/h)
- Game attendance: 50,500
- Referee: Kevin Mar
- TV announcers (ESPN): Rece Davis (play-by-play), Kirk Herbstreit (analyst), and Holly Rowe (sideline)

Game information

First quarter

- (10:55) UNC - Caleb Hood 8-yard run (Rece Verhoff kick), ( Drive: 7 plays, 83 yards, 3:59; North Carolina 7-0)
- (4:08) TCU - Jordan Dwyer 27-yard pass from Josh Hoover (Kyle Lemmermann kick), (Drive: 6 plays, 58 yards, 2:31; Tied 7-7)

Second quarter

- (11:13) TCU - Kyle Lemmermann 32-yard field goal (Drive: 14 plays, 55 yards, 6:24; TCU 10-7)
- (3:57) TCU - Bud Clark 25-yard interception return (Kyle Lemmermann kick), (TCU 17-7)
- (0:00) TCU - Kyle Lemmermann 33-yard field goal (Drive: 9 plays, 63 yards, 0:53; TCU 20-7)

Third quarter

- (14:48) TCU - Kevorian Barnes 75-yard run (Kyle Lemmermann kick), (Drive: 1 play, 75 yards, 0:12; TCU 27-7)
- (8:30) TCU - Trent Battle 28-yard run (Kyle Lemmermann kick), (Drive: 9 plays, 85 yards, 3:59; TCU 34-7)
- (6:56) TCU - Devean Deal 37-yard fumble return (Kyle Lemmermann kick) (TCU 41-7)
- (0:29) UNC - Jake Johnson 2-yard pass from Max Johnson (Rece Verhoff kick), (Drive: 10 plays, 80 yards, 6:22; TCU 41-14)

Fourth quarter

- (9:21) TCU - DJ Rogers 4-yard pass from Josh Hoover (Kyle Lemmermann kick), (Drive: 5 plays, 76 yards, 2:26; TCU 48-14)

| Statistics | TCU | UNC |
|---|---|---|
| First downs | 29 | 10 |
| Plays–yards | 72–542 | 49–222 |
| Rushes–yards | 35–258 | 28–50 |
| Passing yards | 284 | 172 |
| Passing: comp–att–int | 27-37-1 | 13-21-1 |
| Turnovers | 1 | 3 |
| Time of possession | 32:09 | 27:51 |

| Team | Category | Player | Statistics |
|---|---|---|---|
| TCU | Passing | Josh Hoover | 27/36, 284 yards, 2 TD, INT |
| TCU | Rushing | Kevorian Barnes | 11 carries, 113 yards, TD |
| TCU | Receiving | Jordan Dwyer | 9 receptions, 136 yards, TD |
| North Carolina | Passing | Max Johnson | 9/11, 103 yards, TD |
| North Carolina | Rushing | Caleb Hood | 10 carries, 31 yards, TD |
| North Carolina | Receiving | Jordan Shipp | 4 receptions, 84 yards |

=== at Charlotte ===
North Carolina Tar Heels (0–1) at Charlotte 49ers (0–1) – Game summary

| Quarter | 1 | 2 | 3 | 4 | Total |
|---|---|---|---|---|---|
| Tar Heels | 10 | 7 | 0 | 3 | 20 |
| 49ers | 0 | 3 | 0 | 0 | 3 |

at Jerry Richardson Stadium • Charlotte, North Carolina

- Date: September 6
- Game time: 7:00 p.m.
- Game weather: Rain • Temperature: 74 °F (23 °C) • Wind: E at 7 miles per hour (11 km/h)
- Game attendance: 19,233
- Referee: Adam Savoie
- TV announcers (ESPN+): Chuckie Kempf (play-by-play), Tom Luginbill (analyst), and Marilyn Payne (sideline)

Game information

First quarter

- (14:01) UNC – Chris Culliver 51-yard pass from Gio Lopez, Rece Verhoff kick (Drive: 3 plays, 75 yards, 0:59; North Carolina 7–0)
- (8:34) UNC – Rece Verhoff 49-yard field goal (Drive: 7 plays, 34 yards, 3:44; North Carolina 10–0)

Second quarter

- (12:40) CLT – Liam Boyd 39-yard field goal (Drive: 11 plays, 60 yards, 5:27; North Carolina 10–3)
- (0:13) UNC – Davion Gause 12-yard run, Rece Verhoff kick (Drive: 11 plays, 80 yards, 2:38; North Carolina 17–3)

Third quarter

- No scoring plays

Fourth quarter

- (10:46) UNC – Rece Verhoff 33-yard field goal (Drive: 14 plays, 40 yards, 8:08; North Carolina 20–3)

| Statistics | UNC | CLT |
|---|---|---|
| First downs | 15 | 21 |
| Plays–yards | 58–303 | 71–271 |
| Rushes–yards | 33–148 | 29–21 |
| Passing yards | 155 | 250 |
| Passing: comp–att–int | 17–25–0 | 25–42–2 |
| Turnovers | 0 | 2 |
| Time of possession | 29:38 | 30:22 |

| Team | Category | Player | Statistics |
|---|---|---|---|
| North Carolina | Passing | Gio Lopez | 17/25, 155 yards, TD |
| North Carolina | Rushing | Demon June | 9 carries, 52 yards |
| North Carolina | Receiving | Chris Culliver | 3 receptions, 74 yards, TD |
| Charlotte | Passing | Conner Harrell | 17/29, 140 yards |
| Charlotte | Rushing | Rod Gainey Jr. | 6 carries, 15 yards |
| Charlotte | Receiving | Javen Nicholas | 11 receptions, 122 yards |

=== vs Richmond (FCS) ===
Richmond Spiders (FCS) (1–1) at North Carolina Tar Heels (1–1) – Game summary

| Quarter | 1 | 2 | 3 | 4 | Total |
|---|---|---|---|---|---|
| Spiders (FCS) | 0 | 3 | 0 | 3 | 6 |
| Tar Heels | 10 | 10 | 7 | 14 | 41 |

at Kenan Stadium • Chapel Hill, North Carolina

- Date: September 13
- Game time: 3:30 p.m.
- Game weather: Sunny • Temperature: 81 °F (27 °C) • Wind: NE at 7 miles per hour (11 km/h)
- Game attendance: 50,500
- Referee: John Noli
- TV announcers (ACCN): Chris Cotter (play-by-play), Max Browne (analyst), and Kendra Douglas (sideline)

Game information

First Quarter

- (9:57) UNC - Rece Verhoff 27-yard field goal (Drive: 7 Plays, 58 yards, 2:39; UNC 3–0)
- (3:22) UNC - Gio Lopez 29-yard pass to Jordan Shipp, Rece Verhoff kick (Drive: 8 Plays, 62 yards, 4:05; UNC 10–0)

Second Quarter

- (14:51) UNC - Rece Verhoff 22-yard field goal (Drive: 5 Plays, 21 yards, 1:45; UNC 13–0)
- (10:01) UNC - Gio Lopez 1-yard run, Rece Verhoff kick (Drive: 7 Plays, 36 yards, 2:39; UNC 20–0)
- (1:11) RICH - Jayden Alsheskie 25-yard field goal (Drive: 14 Plays, 76 yards, 8:42; UNC 20–3)

Third Quarter

- (2:06) UNC - Gio Lopez 3-yard pass to Jordan Shipp, Rece Verhoff kick (Drive: 7 Plays, 34 yards, 3:21; UNC 27–3)

Fourth Quarter

- (14:00) UNC - Mikai Gbayor 62-yard fumble recovery, Rece Verhoff kick (UNC 34–3)
- (8:13) UNC - Demon June 45-yard run, Rece Verhoff kick (Drive: 7 Plays, 72 yards, 4:06; UNC 41–3)
- (0:06) RICH - Jayden Alsheskie 28-yard field goal (Drive: 15 Plays, 68 yards, 7:48; UNC 41–6)

| Statistics | RICH | UNC |
|---|---|---|
| First downs | 15 | 16 |
| Plays–yards | 63–199 | 50–312 |
| Rushes–yards | 48–124 | 31–193 |
| Passing yards | 75 | 119 |
| Passing: comp–att–int | 9–15–1 | 10–19–1 |
| Turnovers | 3 | 1 |
| Time of possession | 37:59 | 22:01 |

| Team | Category | Player | Statistics |
|---|---|---|---|
| Richmond | Passing | Kyle Wickersham | 6/8, 47 yards |
| Richmond | Rushing | Aziz Foster-Powell | 12 carries, 38 yards |
| Richmond | Receiving | Isaiah Dawson | 2 receptions, 37 yards |
| North Carolina | Passing | Gio Lopez | 10/18, 119 yards, 2 TD |
| North Carolina | Rushing | Demon June | 14 carries, 148 yards, TD |
| North Carolina | Receiving | Jordan Shipp | 4 receptions, 52 yards, 2 TD |

=== at UCF ===
North Carolina Tar Heels (2–1) at UCF Knights (2–0) – Game summary

| Quarter | 1 | 2 | 3 | 4 | Total |
|---|---|---|---|---|---|
| Tar Heels | 0 | 3 | 6 | 0 | 9 |
| Knights | 10 | 10 | 7 | 7 | 34 |

at Acrisure Bounce House • Orlando, Florida

- Date: September 20
- Game time: 3:30 p.m.
- Game weather: Sunny • Temperature: 85 °F (29 °C) • Wind: SW 10 mph
- Game attendance: 44,206
- Referee: Nate Black
- TV announcers (FOX): Eric Collins (play-by-play) and Spencer Tillman (analyst)

Game information

First quarter

- UCF – Tayven Jackson 13-yard run (Noe Ruelas kick), 8:23, Knights 7–0. 13 plays, 75 yards, 6:37.
- UCF – Noe Ruelas 36-yard field goal, 4:51, Knights 10–0. Drive: 4 plays, 5 yards, 1:26.

Second quarter

- UCF – Noe Ruelas 41-yard field goal, 10:03, Knights 13–0. Drive: 14 plays, 42 yards, 7:44.
- UNC – Rece Verhoff 40-yard field goal, 1:23, Knights 13–3. Drive: 7 plays, 29 yards, 1:48.
- UCF – Kylan Fox 17-yard pass from Tayven Jackson (Noe Ruelas kick), 0:13, Knights 20–3. 6 plays, 83 yards, 1:04.

Third quarter

- UCF – Myles Montgomery 1-yard run (Noe Ruelas kick), 9:51, Knights 27–3. 6 plays, 64 yards, 2:57.
- UNC – Kobe Paysour 8-yard pass from Max Johnson (pass failed), 1:06, Knights 27–9. 19 plays, 80 yards, 8:40.

Fourth quarter

- UCF – Jaden Nixon 5-yard run (Noe Ruelas kick), 1:54, Knights 34–9. 18 plays, 93 yards, 10:26.

| Statistics | UNC | UCF |
|---|---|---|
| First downs | 14 | 23 |
| Plays–yards | 58–217 | 66–366 |
| Rushes–yards | 25–63 | 34–143 |
| Passing yards | 154 | 223 |
| Passing: comp–att–int | 22–32–2 | 25–32–0 |
| Turnovers | 2 | 0 |
| Time of possession | 26:13 | 33:47 |

| Team | Category | Player | Statistics |
|---|---|---|---|
| North Carolina | Passing | Gio Lopez | 11/14, 87 yards, 2 INT |
| North Carolina | Rushing | Demon June | 10 carries, 50 yards |
| North Carolina | Receiving | Jordan Shipp | 3 receptions, 44 yards |
| UCF | Passing | Tayven Jackson | 25/32, 223 yards, TD |
| UCF | Rushing | Tayven Jackson | 10 carries, 66 yards, TD |
| UCF | Receiving | Dylan Wade | 5 receptions, 47 yards |

=== vs Clemson ===
Clemson Tigers (1–3) at North Carolina Tar Heels (2–2) – Game summary

| Quarter | 1 | 2 | 3 | 4 | Total |
|---|---|---|---|---|---|
| Tigers | 28 | 7 | 0 | 3 | 38 |
| Tar Heels | 3 | 0 | 0 | 7 | 10 |

at Kenan Stadium • Chapel Hill, North Carolina

- Date: October 4
- Game time: 12:00 p.m.
- Game weather: Temperature: 71 °F (22 °C) • Wind: NE 5 mph • Weather: Sunny
- Game attendance: 50,500
- Referee: Adam Savoie
- TV announcers (ESPN): Mark Jones (play-by-play), Roddy Jones (analyst) and Quint Kessenich (sideline)

Game information

First quarter

- (14:49) CLEM – T. J. Moore 75-yard pass from Antonio Williams, Nolan Hauser kick (Drive: 1 play, 75 yards, 0:11; CLEM 7–0)
- (10:02) UNC – Rece Verhoff 35-yard field goal (Drive: 10 plays, 58 yards, 4:39; CLEM 7–3)
- (08:54) CLEM – Adam Randall 35-yard pass from Cade Klubnik, Nolan Hauser kick (Drive: 3 plays, 75 yards, 1:08; CLEM 14–3)
- (04:15) CLEM – Christian Bentancur 45-yard pass from Cade Klubnik, Nolan Hauser kick (Drive: 5 plays, 57 yards, 2:48; CLEM 21–3)
- (00:01) CLEM – Adam Randall 23-yard pass from Cade Klubnik, Nolan Hauser kick (Drive: 7 plays, 46 yards, 2:54; CLEM 28–3)

Second quarter

- (2:02) CLEM – Christian Bentancur 8-yard pass from Cade Klubnik, Nolan Hauser kick (Drive: 6 plays, 37 yards, 3:16; CLEM 35–3)

Third quarter

- No scoring plays.

Fourth quarter

- (13:20) CLEM – Nolan Hauser 27-yard field goal (Drive: 14 plays, 55 yards, 5:20; CLEM 38–3)
- (10:25) UNC – Benjamin Hall 11-yard run, Rece Verhoff kick (Drive: 5 plays, 75 yards, 2:55; CLEM 38–10)

| Statistics | CLEM | UNC |
|---|---|---|
| First downs | 23 | 19 |
| Plays–yards | 70–488 | 60–270 |
| Rushes–yards | 31–89 | 18–57 |
| Passing yards | 399 | 213 |
| Passing: comp–att–int | 30–39–0 | 26–42–0 |
| Turnovers | 0 | 0 |
| Time of possession | 32:25 | 27:35 |

| Team | Category | Player | Statistics |
|---|---|---|---|
| Clemson | Passing | Cade Klubnik | 22/24, 254 yards, 4 TD |
| Clemson | Rushing | Adam Randall | 8 carries, 30 yards |
| Clemson | Receiving | T. J. Moore | 5 receptions, 108 yards, TD |
| North Carolina | Passing | Max Johnson | 26/42, 213 yards |
| North Carolina | Rushing | Benjamin Hall | 5 carries, 24 yards, TD |
| North Carolina | Receiving | Jordan Shipp | 5 receptions, 41 yards |

=== at California ===
North Carolina Tar Heels (2–3) at California Golden Bears (4–2) – Game summary

| Quarter | 1 | 2 | 3 | 4 | Total |
|---|---|---|---|---|---|
| Tar Heels | 7 | 3 | 0 | 8 | 18 |
| Golden Bears | 14 | 0 | 7 | 0 | 21 |

at California Memorial Stadium • Berkeley, California

- Date: October 17
- Game time: 10:30 p.m.
- Game weather: Temperature: 63 °F (17 °C) • Wind: NW at 2 miles per hour (3.2 km/h) • Weather: Clear
- Game attendance: 33,401
- Referee: Jon Noli
- TV announcers (ESPN): Anish Shroff (play-by-play), Andre Ware (analyst) and Paul Carcaterra (sideline)

Game information

First quarter

- (12:48) CAL – Jaron-Keawe Sagapolutele 3-yard run, Chase Meyer kick (Drive: 4 plays, 25 yards, 1:50; California 7–0)
- (4:48) UNC – Benjamin Hall 18-yard run, Rece Verhoff kick (Drive: 4 plays, 70 yards, 1:15; Tied 7–7)
- (0:42) CAL – Jacob De Jesus 7-yard pass from Jaron-Keawe Sagapolutele, Chase Meyer kick (Drive: 12 plays, 75 yards, 4:06; California 14–7)

Second quarter

- (6:14) UNC – Rece Verhoff 41-yard field goal (Drive: 11 plays, 45 yards, 5:37; California 14–10)

Third quarter

- (9:22) CAL – Kendrick Raphael 2-yard run, Chase Meyer kick (Drive: 11 plays, 79 yards, 5:33; California 21–10)

Fourth quarter

- (12:14) UNC – Davion Gause 4-yard run, Benjamin Hall pass (Drive: 11 plays, 84 yards, 4:45; California 21–18)

| Statistics | UNC | CAL |
|---|---|---|
| First downs | 18 | 19 |
| Plays–yards | 64–287 | 71–294 |
| Rushes–yards | 29–120 | 31–80 |
| Passing yards | 167 | 214 |
| Passing: comp–att–int | 19–35–0 | 22–40–0 |
| Turnovers | 3 | 0 |
| Time of possession | 31:10 | 25:50 |

| Team | Category | Player | Statistics |
|---|---|---|---|
| North Carolina | Passing | Gio Lopez | 19/35, 167 yards |
| North Carolina | Rushing | Benjamin Hall | 14 carries, 68 yards, TD |
| North Carolina | Receiving | Kobe Paysour | 6 receptions, 101 yards |
| California | Passing | Jaron-Keawe Sagapolutele | 21/39, 209 yards, TD |
| California | Rushing | Kendrick Raphael | 22 carries, 81 yards, TD |
| California | Receiving | Jacob de Jesus | 13 receptions, 105 yards, TD |

=== vs No. 16 Virginia (South's Oldest Rivalry) ===
No. 16 Virginia Cavaliers (6–1) at North Carolina Tar Heels (2–4) – Game summary

| Quarter | 1 | 2 | 3 | 4 | OT | Total |
|---|---|---|---|---|---|---|
| No. 16 Cavaliers | 3 | 7 | 0 | 0 | 7 | 17 |
| Tar Heels | 0 | 10 | 0 | 0 | 6 | 16 |

at Kenan Stadium • Chapel Hill, North Carolina

- Date: October 25
- Game time: Noon
- Game weather:
- Game attendance: 50,500
- Referee: Darryl DeBerry
- TV announcers (ACCN): Wes Durham (play-by-play), Steve Addazio (analyst), and Dana Boyle (sideline)

Game information

First quarter

- (4:33) UVA – Will Bettridge 34-yard field goal (Drive: 9 plays, 63 yards, 3:52; Virgina 3–0)

Second quarter

- (11:30) UNC – Rece Verhoff 34-yard field goal (Drive:12 plays, 69 yards, 5:35; Tied 3–3)
- (6:36) UVA – Trell Harris 30-yard pass from Chandler Morris, Will Bettridge kick (Drive: 6 plays, 60 yards, 2:10; Virgina 10–3)
- (1:24) UNC – Gio Lopez 1-yard run, Rece Verhoff kick (Drive: 6 plays, 60 yards, 2:10; Tied 10–10)

Third quarter

- No scoring plays.

Fourth quarter

- No scoring plays.

Overtime

- UVA – J'Mari Taylor 1-yard run, Will Bettridge kick (Drive: 7 plays, 25 yards; Virgina 17–10)
- UVA – Davion Gause 9-yard pass from Gio Lopez, pass failed (Drive: 5 plays, 25 yards, 2:10; Virgina 17–16)

| Statistics | UVA | UNC |
|---|---|---|
| First downs | 16 | 20 |
| Plays–yards | 69–259 | 75–353 |
| Rushes–yards | 34–59 | 39–145 |
| Passing yards | 200 | 208 |
| Passing: comp–att–int | 20–35–1 | 23–36–2 |
| Turnovers | 1 | 3 |
| Time of possession | 24:27 | 32:33 |

| Team | Category | Player | Statistics |
|---|---|---|---|
| Virginia | Passing | Chandler Morris | 20/35, 200 yards, TD, INT |
| Virginia | Rushing | J'Mari Taylor | 21 carries, 69 yards, TD |
| Virginia | Receiving | Jahmal Edrine | 6 catches, 75 yards |
| North Carolina | Passing | Gio Lopez | 23/36, 208 yards, TD, 2 INT |
| North Carolina | Rushing | Benjamin Hall | 11 carries, 50 yards |
| North Carolina | Receiving | Jordan Shipp | 7 catches, 67 yards |

=== at Syracuse ===
North Carolina Tar Heels (2–5) at Syracuse Orange (3–5) – Game summary

| Quarter | 1 | 2 | 3 | 4 | Total |
|---|---|---|---|---|---|
| Tar Heels | 3 | 3 | 14 | 7 | 27 |
| Orange | 7 | 3 | 0 | 0 | 10 |

at JMA Wireless Dome • Syracuse, New York

- Date: October 31
- Game time: 7:30 p.m.
- Game weather: Indoor
- Game attendance: 37,184
- Referee: Mike Roche
- TV announcers (ESPN): Anish Shroff (play-by-play), Andre Ware (analyst), and Paul Carcaterra (sideline)

Game information

First quarter

- UNC – Rece Verhoff 24-yard field goal, 7:59. Tar Heels 3–0. Drive: 7 plays, 51 yards, 3:20.
- SYR – Anwar Sparrow 51-yard fumble return (Tripp Woody kick), 4:38. Orange 7–3.

Second quarter

- SYR – Tripp Woody 31-yard field goal, 12:17. Orange 10–3. Drive: 13 plays, 50 yards, 5:41.
- UNC – Rece Verhoff 43-yard field goal, 0:43. Orange 10–6. Drive: 8 plays, 67 yards, 4:05.

Third quarter

- UNC – Demon June 72-yard pass from Gio Lopez (Rece Verhoff kick), 13:26. Tar Heels 13–10. Drive: 1 play, 72 yards, 0:13.
- UNC – Demon June 5-yard run (Rece Verhoff kick), 0:08. Tar Heels 20–10. Drive: 12 plays, 80 yards, 7:10.

Fourth quarter

- UNC – Jordan Shipp 21-yard pass from Gio Lopez (Rece Verhoff kick), 10:35. Tar Heels 27–10. Drive: 4 plays, 34 yards, 2:18.

| Statistics | UNC | SYR |
|---|---|---|
| First downs | 20 | 12 |
| Plays–yards | 62–426 | 50–152 |
| Rushes–yards | 43–210 | 32–113 |
| Passing yards | 216 | 39 |
| Passing: comp–att–int | 15-19-0 | 4-18-0 |
| Turnovers | 1 | 1 |
| Time of possession | 35:29 | 24:31 |

| Team | Category | Player | Statistics |
|---|---|---|---|
| North Carolina | Passing | Gio Lopez | 15/19, 216 yards, 2 TD |
| North Carolina | Rushing | Demon June | 13 carries, 101 yards, TD |
| North Carolina | Receiving | Demon June | 2 receptions, 81 yards, TD |
| Syracuse | Passing | Joseph Filardi | 4/18, 39 yards |
| Syracuse | Rushing | Yasin Willis | 15 carries, 61 yards |
| Syracuse | Receiving | Darius Johnson | 1 reception, 25 yards |

=== vs Stanford ===
Stanford Cardinal (3–6) at North Carolina Tar Heels (3–5) – Game summary

| Quarter | 1 | 2 | 3 | 4 | Total |
|---|---|---|---|---|---|
| Cardinal | 0 | 3 | 0 | 12 | 15 |
| Tar Heels | 3 | 0 | 7 | 10 | 20 |

at Kenan Stadium • Chapel Hill, North Carolina

- Date: November 8
- Game time: 4:30 p.m. EST
- Game weather: Cloudy
- Game attendance: 50,500
- Referee: Jerry Magallanes
- TV announcers (The CW): Thom Brennaman (play-by-play), Will Blackmon (analyst) and Wes Bryant (sideline)

Game information

First quarter

- (5:49) UNC – Rece Verhoff 27-yard field goal (Drive: 4 plays, -2 yards, 0:56, North Carolina 3–0)

Second quarter

- (0:00) STAN – Emmet Kenney 38-yard field goal (Drive: 16 plays, 56 yards, 4:27, Tied 3–3)

Third quarter

- (7:43) UNC – Davion Gause 20-yard pass from Gio Lopez, Rece Verhoff kick (Drive: 12 plays, 75 yards, 7:17, North Carolina 10–3)

Fourth quarter

- (14:16) UNC – Rece Verhoff 48-yard field goal (Drive: 4 plays, 6 yards, 1:52, North Carolina 13–3)
- (12:04) UNC – Jordan Shipp 55-yard pass from Gio Lopez, Rece Verhoff kick (Drive: 3 plays, 60 yards, 1:01, North Carolina 20–3)
- (8:28) STAN – Cole Tabb 1-yard run, two-point pass conversion failed (Drive: 9 plays, 75 yards, 3:36, North Carolina 20–9)
- (1:48) STAN – CJ Williams 24-yard pass from Elijah Brown, two-point run conversion failed (Drive: 9 plays, 80 yards, 3:07, North Carolina 20–15)

| Statistics | STAN | UNC |
|---|---|---|
| First downs | 22 | 13 |
| Plays–yards | 74–320 | 52–253 |
| Rushes–yards | 35–36 | 27–50 |
| Passing yards | 284 | 203 |
| Passing: comp–att–int | 27–39–1 | 18–25–0 |
| Turnovers | 2 | 1 |
| Time of possession | 32:37 | 27:23 |

| Team | Category | Player | Statistics |
|---|---|---|---|
| Stanford | Passing | Elijah Brown | 27/39, 284 yards, TD, INT |
| Stanford | Rushing | Micah Ford | 17 carries, 68 yards |
| Stanford | Receiving | Caden High | 10 receptions, 102 yards |
| North Carolina | Passing | Gio Lopez | 18/25, 203 yards, 2 TD |
| North Carolina | Rushing | Davion Gause | 11 carries, 28 yards |
| North Carolina | Receiving | Jordan Shipp | 5 receptions, 83 yards, TD |

=== at Wake Forest (rivalry) ===
North Carolina Tar Heels (4–5) at Wake Forest Demon Deacons (6–3) – Game summary

| Quarter | 1 | 2 | 3 | 4 | Total |
|---|---|---|---|---|---|
| Tar Heels | 0 | 6 | 3 | 3 | 12 |
| Demon Deacons | 7 | 7 | 7 | 7 | 28 |

at Allegacy Federal Credit Union Stadium • Winston-Salem, North Carolina

- Date: November 15
- Game time: 4:30 p.m. EST
- Game weather:
- Game attendance: 32,390
- Referee: Darryl DeBerry
- TV announcers (The CW): Thom Brennaman (play-by-play), Will Blackmon (analyst) and Wes Bryant (sideline)

Game information

First quarter

- WAKE – Carlos Hernandez 51-yard run (Connor Calvert kick), 13:11. Demon Deacons 7–0. Drive: 5 plays, 75 yards, 1:49.

Second quarter

- UNC – Rece Verhoff 40-yard field goal, 12:54. Demon Deacons 7–3. Drive: 13 plays, 58 yards, 7:37.
- WAKE – Demond Claiborne 12-yard run (Connor Calvert kick), 1:47. Demon Deacons 14–3. Drive: 13 plays, 67 yards, 5:40.
- UNC – Rece Verhoff 57-yard field goal, 0:00. Demon Deacons 14–6. Drive: 6 plays, 23 yards, 1:47.

Third quarter

- UNC – Rece Verhoff 42-yard field goal, 6:46. Demon Deacons 14–9. Drive: 6 plays, 43 yards, 2:43.
- WAKE – Carlos Hernandez 70-yard pass from Robby Ashford (Connor Calvert kick), 5:54. Demon Deacons 21–9. Drive: 2 plays, 75 yards, 0:52.

Fourth quarter

- UNC – Rece Verhoff 47-yard field goal, 11:03. Demon Deacons 21–12. Drive: 6 plays, 41 yards, 1:49.
- WAKE – Robby Ashford 2-yard run (Connor Calvert kick), 0:22. Demon Deacons 28–12. Drive: 10 plays, 55 yards, 4:59.

| Statistics | UNC | WAKE |
|---|---|---|
| First downs | 16 | 19 |
| Plays–yards | 61–257 | 64–414 |
| Rushes–yards | 24–56 | 39–223 |
| Passing yards | 201 | 191 |
| Passing: comp–att–int | 21–37–0 | 15–25–0 |
| Turnovers | 0 | 1 |
| Time of possession | 30:02 | 29:58 |

| Team | Category | Player | Statistics |
|---|---|---|---|
| North Carolina | Passing | Gio Lopez | 21/36, 201 yards |
| North Carolina | Rushing | Demon June | 9 carries, 32 yards |
| North Carolina | Receiving | Jake Johnson | 5 receptions, 54 yards |
| Wake Forest | Passing | Robby Ashford | 15/25, 191 yards, TD |
| Wake Forest | Rushing | Demond Claiborne | 23 carries, 98 yards, TD |
| Wake Forest | Receiving | Carlos Hernandez | 6 receptions, 100 yards, TD |

=== vs Duke (Victory Bell) ===
Duke Blue Devils (5-5) at North Carolina Tar Heels (4-6) – Game summary

| Quarter | 1 | 2 | 3 | 4 | Total |
|---|---|---|---|---|---|
| Blue Devils | 7 | 10 | 7 | 8 | 32 |
| Tar Heels | 7 | 3 | 8 | 7 | 25 |

at Kenan Stadium • Chapel Hill, North Carolina

- Date: November 22
- Game time: 3:30 p.m.
- Game weather: Sunny, 73 °F (23 °C)
- Game attendance: 50,500
- Referee: Justin Elliott
- TV announcers (ACCN): Wes Durham (play-by-play), Steve Addazio (analyst) and Dana Boyle (sideline)

Game information

First quarter

- UNC – Gio Lopez 1-yard run (Rece Verhoff kick), 7:57. Tar Heels 7–0. Drive: 13 plays, 75 yards, 7:03.
- DUKE – Anderson Castle 1-yard run (Todd Pelino kick), 2:59. Tied 7–7. Drive: 10 plays, 53 yards, 4:51.

Second quarter

- DUKE – Jeremiah Hasley 14-yard pass from Darian Mensah (Todd Pelino kick), 10:25. Blue Devils 14–7. Drive: 13 plays, 78 yards, 6:11.
- DUKE – Todd Pelino 33-yard field goal, 2:33. Blue Devils 17–7. Drive: 14 plays, 71 yards, 6:51.
- UNC – Rece Verhoff 49-yard field goal, 0:07. Blue Devils 17–10. Drive: 8 plays, 44 yards, 2:26.

Third quarter

- DUKE – Anderson Castle 1-yard run (Todd Pelino kick), 9:15. Blue Devils 24–10. Drive: 11 plays, 44 yards, 5:45.
- UNC – Jordan Shipp 20-yard pass from Gio Lopez (Gio Lopez pass to Jordan Shipp), 4:52. Blue Devils 24–18. Drive: 10 plays, 74 yards, 4:23.

Fourth quarter

- UNC – Davion Gause 12-yard run (Rece Verhoff kick), 13:13. Tar Heels 25–24. Drive: 9 plays, 91 yards, 4:30.
- DUKE – Anderson Castle 1-yard run (Darian Mensah pass to Nate Sheppard), 2:18. Blue Devils 32–25. Drive: 11 plays, 67 yards, 4:19.

| Statistics | DUKE | UNC |
|---|---|---|
| First downs | 24 | 18 |
| Plays–yards | 76–352 | 52–305 |
| Rushes–yards | 43–177 | 25–101 |
| Passing yards | 175 | 204 |
| Passing: comp–att–int | 20–33–0 | 21–27–0 |
| Turnovers | 0 | 0 |
| Time of possession | 36:00 | 24:00 |

| Team | Category | Player | Statistics |
|---|---|---|---|
| Duke | Passing | Darian Mensah | 20/33, 175 yards, TD |
| Duke | Rushing | Nate Sheppard | 22 carries, 90 yards |
| Duke | Receiving | Jeremiah Hasley | 7 receptions, 85 yards, TD |
| North Carolina | Passing | Gio Lopez | 21/27, 204 yards, TD |
| North Carolina | Rushing | Davion Gause | 8 carries, 63 yards, TD |
| North Carolina | Receiving | Jordan Shipp | 8 receptions, 83 yards, TD |

=== at NC State (rivalry) ===
North Carolina Tar Heels (4-7) at NC State Wolfpack (6-5) – Game summary

| Quarter | 1 | 2 | 3 | 4 | Total |
|---|---|---|---|---|---|
| Tar Heels | 0 | 10 | 3 | 6 | 19 |
| Wolfpack | 14 | 14 | 0 | 14 | 42 |

at Carter–Finley Stadium • Raleigh, North Carolina

- Date: November 29
- Game time: 7:30 p.m.
- Game weather: Clear • Temperature: 34 °F (1 °C) • Wind: SE at 4 mph (6.4 km/h)
- Game attendance: 56,919
- Referee: Nate Black
- TV announcers (ACCN): Chris Cotter (play-by-play), Max Browne (analyst) and Ashley Stroehlein (sideline)

Game information

First quarter

- NCSU – Wesley Grimes 15-yard pass from CJ Bailey (Kanoah Vinesett kick), 10:10. Wolfpack 7–0. Drive: 11 plays, 75 yards, 4:50.
- NCSU – Will Wilson 7-yard run (Kanoah Vinesett kick), 3:26. Wolfpack 14–0. Drive: 12 plays, 76 yards, 5:22.

Second quarter

- UNC – Jordan Shipp 20-yard pass from Gio Lopez (Rece Verhoff kick), 13:03. Wolfpack 14–7. Drive: 9 plays, 80 yards, 5:14.
- NCSU – Will Wilson 1-yard run (Kanoah Vinesett kick), 7:12. Wolfpack 21–7. Drive: 11 plays, 75 yards, 5:51.
- UNC – Rece Verhoff 49-yard field goal, 1:49. Wolfpack 21–10. Drive: 11 plays, 45 yards, 5:23.
- NCSU – Justin Joly 1-yard pass from CJ Bailey (Kanoah Vinesett kick), 0:18. Wolfpack 28–10. Drive: 11 plays, 75 yards, 1:31.

Third quarter

- UNC – Rece Verhoff 29-yard field goal, 3:16. Wolfpack 28–13. Drive: 12 plays, 78 yards, 4:51.

Fourth quarter

- NCSU – Will Wilson 15-yard run (Kanoah Vinesett kick), 14:52. Wolfpack 35–13. Drive: 8 plays, 75 yards, 3:24.
- NCSU – Will Wilson 3-yard run (Kanoah Vinesett kick), 5:34. Wolfpack 42–13. Drive: 10 plays, 42 yards, 6:52.
- UNC – Jordan Owens 4-yard pass from Au'Tori Newkirk (pass failed), 1:25. Wolfpack 42–19. Drive: 11 plays, 65 yards, 4:09.

| Statistics | UNC | NCSU |
|---|---|---|
| First downs | 20 | 27 |
| Plays–yards | 60–265 | 72–386 |
| Rushes–yards | 24–70 | 42–185 |
| Passing yards | 195 | 201 |
| Passing: comp–att–int | 22–36–0 | 21–30–0 |
| Turnovers | 1 | 0 |
| Time of possession | 27:01 | 32:59 |

| Team | Category | Player | Statistics |
|---|---|---|---|
| North Carolina | Passing | Gio Lopez | 11/16, 118 yards, TD |
| North Carolina | Rushing | Benjamin Hall | 6 carries, 29 yards |
| North Carolina | Receiving | Jordan Shipp | 8 receptions, 90 yards, TD |
| NC State | Passing | CJ Bailey | 21/30, 201 yards, 2 TD |
| NC State | Rushing | Will Wilson | 12 carries, 54 yards, 4 TD |
| NC State | Receiving | Wesley Grimes | 5 receptions, 61 yards, TD |
