= Au'Tori Newkirk =

American football player (born 2007)

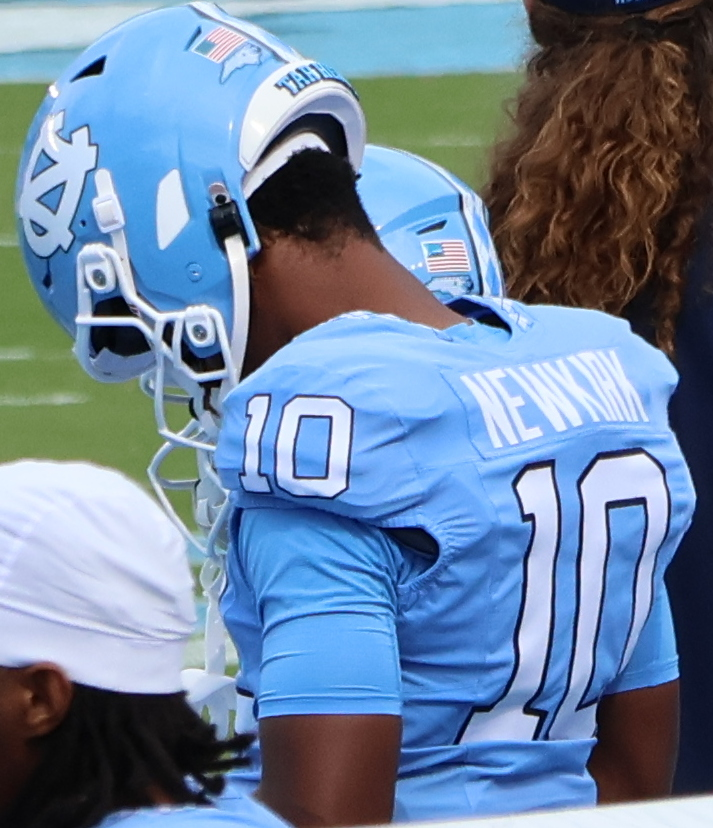
- Newkirk in 2025

No. 10 – North Carolina Tar Heels
- Position: Quarterback
- Class: Redshirt Freshman

Personal information
- Born: February 2007 (age 19); Norfolk, Virginia
- Listed height: 6 ft 3 in (1.91 m)
- Listed weight: 200 lb (91 kg)

Career information
- High school: Maury (Norfolk, Virginia)
- College: North Carolina (2025–present)

Au'Tori Newkirk (born February 2007) is an American college football quarterback for the North Carolina Tar Heels. He played high school football at Maury High School in Norfolk, Virginia, leading the Commodores to two straight state titles.

== Early life ==
=== 2023 season ===
Newkirk attended Matthew Fontaine Maury High School in Norfolk, Virginia, where he played for the Commodores in Class 5 of the Virginia High School League (VHSL). He became the starting quarterback in his junior year as the Commodores were ranked number 1 in the state and coming off a second-consecutive loss in the Class 5 state championship a season prior. In his first three games starting, Newkirk notched top-tier victories against Wise (Maryland), Highland Springs, and Dinwiddie: Dinwiddie were the defending state champions in Class 4. In his first Eastern District game, Newkirk led the Commodores to a 74–19 victory over rival Lake Taylor. In the final game of the season, Newkirk threw for 231 yards in a 62–0 rout over Granby to clinch a perfect regular season at 10–0. He finished the regular season atop the passing yards list for the Hampton Roads area, passing for 2,653 yards, 32 touchdowns to 4 interceptions, and completing 68% of his passes. The Commodores finished the regular season ranked 82nd nationally by MaxPreps.

In the postseason, the Commodores defeated Warwick enroute to their sixth straight Region B title and a spot in the Class 5 state semifinals. In the semifinal, the Commodores routed Indian River, defeating the Braves 55–0 and reaching their third-consecutive state championship. In the Class 5 state championship, the Commodores faced off against Stone Bridge, who Maury defeated in 2019 to clinch their most recent state championship. In the state championship, Newkirk tossed for 287 yards and four touchdowns while rushing for 54 yards and two more touchdowns as he led the Commodores to a 45–34 victory over Stone Bridge to win the state championship. Newkirk was selected as the 2023 Abe Goldblatt All-Tidewater Player of the Year, the Class 5 Offensive Player of the Year, and the Eastern District Offensive Player of the Year.

=== 2024 season ===
In his senior season, he threw for 3,802 yards to 50 touchdowns, leading Maury to another 15–0 record and a back-to-back Class 5 state championship. He was selected as just the fifth player in the history of the Abe Goldblatt award to win it back-to-back, also earning himself another Class 5 Offensive Player of the Year.

College recruiting
Name	Hometown	School	Height	Weight	Commit date
Au'Tori Newkirk; QB	Norfolk, Virginia	Maury HS	6 ft 3 in (1.91 m)	200 lb (91 kg)	Jan 21, 2025
Au'Tori Newkirk; QB	Recruit ratings: Scout: Rivals:				
Overall recruit ranking: Scout: 22 (QB), 13 (VA) Rivals: 55 (QB), 26 (VA)
Note: In many cases, Scout, Rivals, 247Sports, On3, and ESPN may conflict in their listings of height and weight.; In these cases, the average was taken. ESPN grades are on a 100-point scale.; Sources: "2025 Team Ranking". Rivals.com.

== Collegiate career ==
Newkirk committed to play for Bill Belichick and the North Carolina Tar Heels on January 21, 2025.

=== 2025 season ===
As a true freshman, Newkirk began his season fourth on the depth chart, behind starting quarterback Gio Lopez, Bryce Baker, and Max Johnson. He saw his first action during a blowout against Richmond. Newkirk threw one pass for an interception and was pulled from the game. He threw his first collegiate touchdown pass against NC State, a 4-yard pass to tight end Jordan Owens.

=== Statistics ===
Year	Team	Games			Passing								Rushing			
Year	Team	GP	GS	Record	Cmp	Att	Pct	Yds	Avg	TD	Int	Rtg	Att	Yds	Avg	TD
2025	North Carolina	2	0	–	3	6	50.0	23	3.8	1	1	103.9	1	13	13.0	0
Career		2	0	–	3	6	50.0	23	3.8	1	1	103.9	1	13	13.0	0
