= Thaddeus Dixon (American football) =

American football player (born 2002)

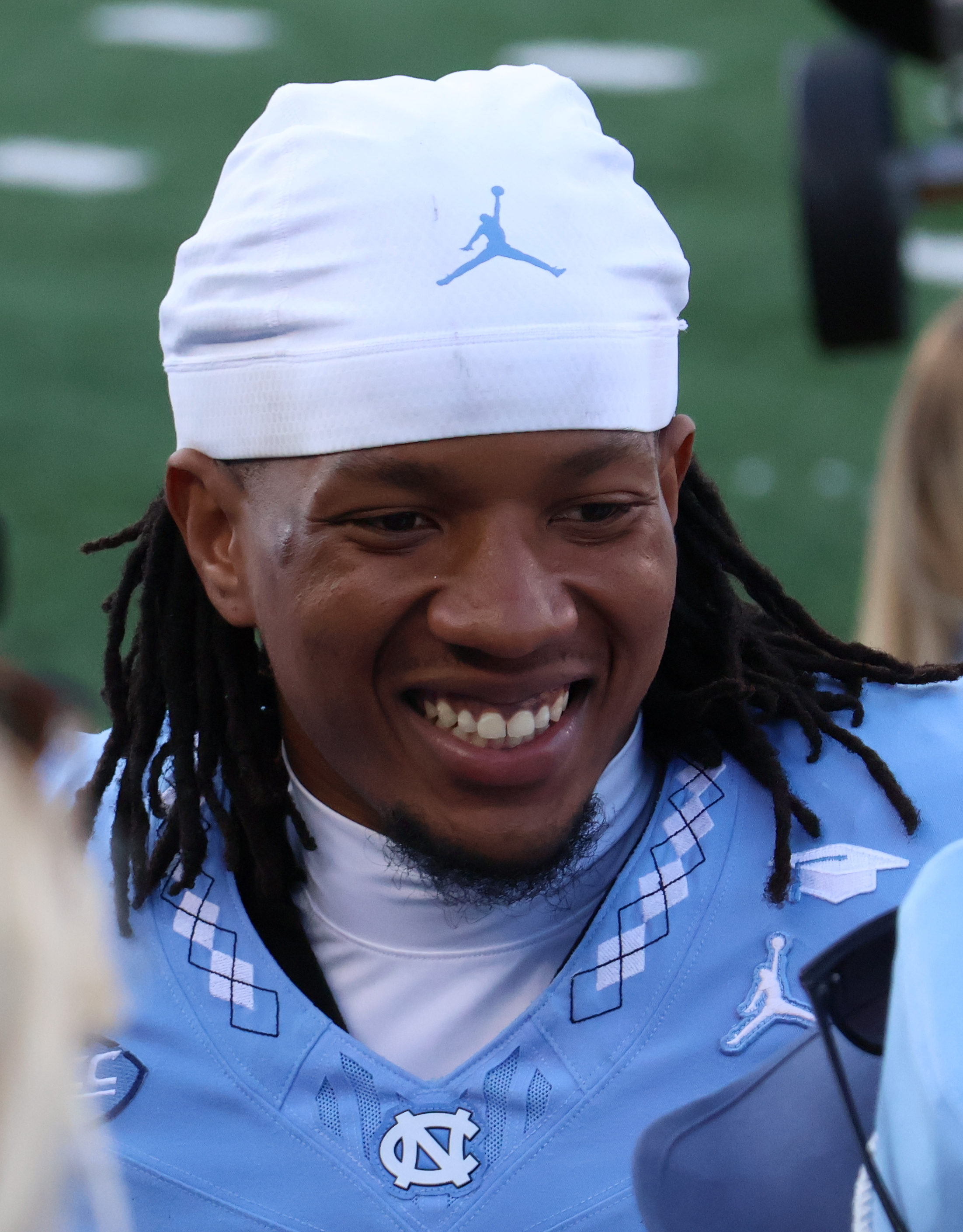
- Dixon with North Carolina in 2025

No. 39 – New York Giants
- Position: Cornerback
- Roster status: Injured reserve

Personal information
- Born: February 20, 2002 (age 24)
- Listed height: 6 ft 1 in (1.85 m)
- Listed weight: 195 lb (88 kg)

Career information
- High school: La Mirada (La Mirada, California)
- College: Long Beach City College (2021–2022); Washington (2023–2024); North Carolina (2025)
- NFL draft: 2026: undrafted

Career history
- New York Giants (2026–present)
- Stats at Pro Football Reference

Thaddeus Dixon (born February 20, 2002) is an American college football cornerback for the New York Giants of the National Football League (NFL). He played college football for the North Carolina Tar Heels, Washington Huskies and at Long Beach City College.

== Early life ==
Dixon attended Paramount High School in Paramount, California for his junior season and La Mirada High School in La Mirada, California for his freshman, sophomore, and senior seasons. He held offers from schools such as Oregon State and Wyoming, where he initially decided to commit to play college football for the Oregon State Beavers, but due to the COVID-19 pandemic, Dixon decided to commit to play football at Junior College school Long Beach City College.

== College career ==
=== Long Beach City College ===
In two seasons at Long Beach City College in 2021 and 2022, Dixon notched 76 tackles, five interceptions, and a touchdown.

=== Washington ===
Dixon committed to play Division I college football for the Washington Huskies. In 2023, he appeared in 14 games with one start for the Huskies, where he totaled 26 tackles, six pass deflections, and an interception. Heading into the 2024 season, Dixon earned a starting spot in the Huskies secondary. In the 2024 regular-season finale, he notched a team-high eight tackles and a pass deflection versus Oregon.

=== North Carolina ===
On January 5, 2025, Dixon entered the transfer portal. He eventually joined the North Carolina Tar Heels under legendary head coach Bill Belichick, remaining with his defensive coordinator Stephen Belichick, who also joined North Carolina.

== Professional career ==
Pre-draft measurables
Height	Weight	Arm length	Hand span	Wingspan	Vertical jump	Broad jump	Bench press
6 ft 0 5/8 in (1.84 m)	195 lb (88 kg)	31 1/8 in (0.79 m)	10 in (0.25 m)	6 ft 4 1/4 in (1.94 m)	39.5 in (1.00 m)	10 ft 5 in (3.18 m)	10 reps
All values from NFL Combine/Pro Day

Dixon signed with the New York Giants as an undrafted free agent on May 8, 2026. On May 14, Dixon tore his Achilles tendon during a team workout and was subsequently placed on season-ending injured reserve.
