= Rolesville High School =

American public school in North Carolina

Location
- 1099 East Young Street; Rolesville, North Carolina 27571; United States; 35°54′23″N 78°26′34″W

Information
- School type: Public
- Opened: 2013 (13 years ago)
- School district: Wake County Public School System
- CEEB code: 343394
- Principal: Phelan Perry
- Teaching staff: 126.13 (FTE)
- Grades: 9–12
- Enrollment: 2,319 (2023–2024)
- Student to teacher ratio: 18.39
- Schedule type: Block
- Colors: Red, Black, and Silver
- Athletics: NCHSAA 8A
- Athletics conference: CAP 8A
- Mascot: Rams
- Website: Rolesville High School

Rolesville High School is a public high school located in Rolesville, North Carolina, United States. The school is a part of the Wake County Public School System.

== History ==
Rolesville High School opened in 2013, after the splitting of the former Wake Forest-Rolesville High School, which is now Wake Forest High School. The school is a $73 million, state of the art, 21st century designed school.

== Athletics ==
Rolesville is a member of the North Carolina High School Athletic Association (NCHSAA) and are classified as an 8A school. The school is a part of the CAP 8A Conference.

=== Sporting achievements ===
In 2021, the Rolesville football team won the NCHSAA 4A Eastern Regional championship, finishing as the 4A state runner-ups.

A fourth-quarter rally propelled the Rolesville Rams to their first NCHSAA 4A girls' basketball state championship in 2024. In the championship game, the Rams outscored the Charlotte Catholic Cougars 28-14 in the fourth quarter, to win 65-58.

The Rolesville girls track & field team won the NCHSAA 4A state title in 2024, their first in the history of the program.

== Notable alumni ==
- Byrum Brown, college football quarterback for the Auburn Tigers
- Xavier Lewis, college football defensive tackle for the North Carolina Tar Heels
- Noah Rogers, college football wide receiver for the Alabama Crimson Tide
