= Max Johnson =

American football player (born 2001)

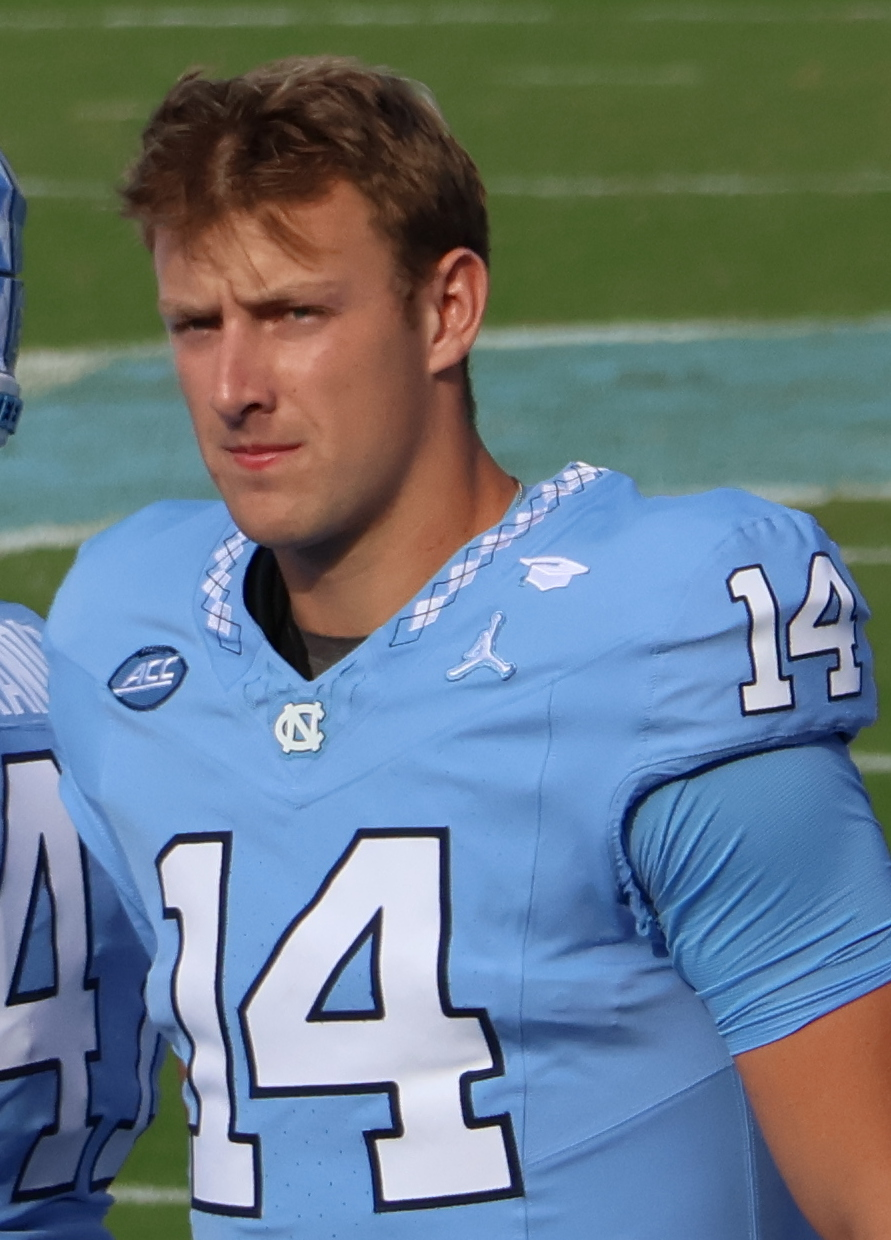
- Johnson with North Carolina in 2025

No. 7 – Georgia Southern Eagles
- Position: Quarterback
- Class: Graduate Student

Personal information
- Born: July 25, 2001 (age 25); Athens, Georgia, U.S.
- Listed height: 6 ft 5 in (1.96 m)
- Listed weight: 225 lb (102 kg)

Career information
- High school: Oconee County (Watkinsville, Georgia)
- College: LSU (2020–2021); Texas A&M (2022–2023); North Carolina (2024–2025); Georgia Southern (2026–present)
- Stats at ESPN

Max Johnson (born July 25, 2001) is an American college football quarterback for the Georgia Southern Eagles. He previously played for the LSU Tigers, Texas A&M Aggies, and North Carolina Tar Heels.

== Early life ==
Johnson grew up in Athens, Georgia and attended Oconee County High School. As a senior, he threw for 2,143 yards, 30 touchdowns and five interceptions and was named the Georgia 4A Offensive Player of the Year. Johnson was rated a four-star recruit and committed to play college football at Louisiana State over an offer from Miami, coached by his uncle Mark Richt, as well as offers from Florida State, Georgia, Tennessee and South Carolina.

== College career ==
=== LSU ===
Johnson started his freshman season as the team's third-string quarterback before being named the team's starter before LSU's game against Florida. In his first career start, he threw for 239 yards and three touchdowns in a 37–34 upset victory over the sixth-ranked Gators and was named the Southeastern Conference Offensive Player of the Week for his performance. The following game, Johnson passed for an LSU freshman record 435 yards with three touchdowns and an interception while also rushing for 45 yards and two touchdowns in a 53–48 win over Ole Miss. In his first season at LSU, Johnson completed 88 out of 150 attempted passes for 1,069 passing yards, eight touchdowns and one interception.

In the 2021 season, Johnson was named LSU's starting quarterback during preseason training camp following an injury to Myles Brennan. In the season opener against UCLA, Johnson completed 26 of 46 passes for a season-high 330 yards, three touchdowns, and one interception in a loss. Johnson and the Tigers rebounded with victories over McNeese State, Central Michigan, and Mississippi State, with Johnson throwing 12 touchdowns during the three-game winning streak. LSU then lost five of its next six games, with Johnson's lone victory during that stretch coming against No. 20 Florida, where he threw three touchdown passes, including the go-ahead touchdown late in the fourth quarter, in a 49–42 victory. The Tigers later earned victories over Louisiana–Monroe and No. 15 Texas A&M to become bowl eligible. In his final game with LSU against Texas A&M, Johnson completed 22 of 38 passes for 306 yards and three touchdowns, including a game-winning 28-yard touchdown pass to Jaray Jenkins with 20 seconds remaining in a 27–24 victory. During the 2021 season, Johnson appeared in and started 12 games, completing 225 of 373 passes for 2,814 yards, 27 touchdowns, and six interceptions while adding one rushing touchdown. On December 7, 2021, Johnson announced on social media that he would enter the transfer portal, opting out of LSU's appearance in the Texas Bowl.

=== Texas A&M ===
On December 17, 2021, Johnson announced he would transfer to Texas A&M. He began the 2022 season as the backup quarterback to Haynes King. Johnson made his Texas A&M debut in the season opener against Sam Houston, relieving King and completing three of four passes for 23 yards in a 31–0 victory. After the Aggies suffered an upset loss to unranked Appalachian State while ranked No. 6 in the country, Johnson was named the starter against No. 13 Miami. He led the Aggies to a 17–9 victory, completing 10 of 20 passes for 140 yards and throwing a 25-yard touchdown pass to De'Von Achane. The following week against No. 10 Arkansas, Johnson guided Texas A&M to a 23–21 victory, completing 11 of 21 passes for 151 yards and a touchdown. Following the win, the Aggies climbed to No. 17 before facing Mississippi State, where Johnson suffered a season-ending broken bone in his left throwing hand during the loss. On the season, he appeared in four games with three starts, completing 43 of 71 passes for 517 yards and three touchdowns while preserving his redshirt.

In 2023, King transferred to Georgia Tech, while Conner Weigman was named Texas A&M's starting quarterback, leaving Johnson as the primary backup. After Weigman suffered a season-ending injury against Auburn, Johnson took over as the starter. In his five starts, the Aggies went 2–3 before Johnson suffered a rib injury in a loss to No. 10 Ole Miss, ending his season. Johnson finished the season completing 118 of 190 passes for 1,452 yards, nine touchdowns, and five interceptions while adding two rushing touchdowns. On November 26, 2023, Johnson entered the transfer portal.

=== North Carolina ===
On November 29, 2023, Johnson committed to North Carolina. Following Drake Maye's departure to the NFL, Johnson competed with Jacolby Criswell and Conner Harrell for the Tar Heels' starting quarterback job and was named the starter. In the season opener against Minnesota, he suffered a season-ending broken femur and underwent surgery the following day. Johnson missed the remainder of the 2024 season after undergoing five surgeries, and during his recovery it was revealed that the severity of the injury had created a legitimate concern that he could lose his leg.

Johnson began the 2025 season as the backup quarterback to Gio Lopez. In the season opener against TCU, he relieved Lopez and threw his first touchdown pass as a Tar Heel to his brother, Jake Johnson, finishing 9-of-11 passing for 103 yards and a touchdown in the loss. In Week 4 against UCF, he again relieved Lopez after Lopez suffered an injury, leading North Carolina to its only touchdown in another defeat. Following Lopez's injury, Johnson was named the starting quarterback the following week against Clemson, completing 26 of 42 passes for 208 yards in a 38–10 loss. He returned to a backup role after the game and made one more appearance in the regular-season finale against NC State. In four appearances, including one start, Johnson completed 54 of 87 passes for 432 yards and two touchdowns while adding 38 rushing yards. On December 5, 2025, Johnson entered the transfer portal.

=== Georgia Southern ===
On January 10, 2026, Johnson announced that he would be transferring to Georgia Southern. Entering his seventh year of college football, Johnson was named the starting quarterback by head coach Clay Helton for the 2026 season opener against Charleston Southern.

=== Statistics ===
Year	Team	Games			Passing								Rushing			
Year	Team	GP	GS	Record	Cmp	Att	Pct	Yds	Y/A	TD	Int	Rtg	Att	Yds	Avg	TD
2020	LSU	6	2	2–0	88	150	58.7	1,069	7.1	8	1	134.8	54	119	2.2	2
2021	LSU	12	12	6–6	225	373	60.3	2,814	7.5	27	6	144.4	78	−41	−0.5	1
2022	Texas A&M	4	3	2–1	43	71	60.6	517	7.3	3	0	135.7	29	61	2.1	0
2023	Texas A&M	8	5	2–3	118	190	62.1	1,452	7.6	9	5	136.7	51	27	0.5	2
2024	North Carolina	1	1	1−0	12	19	63.2	71	3.7	0	1	84.0	6	10	1.7	1
2025	North Carolina	4	1	0–1	54	87	62.1	432	5.0	2	0	111.4	9	38	4.2	0
2026	Georgia Southern	7	7	3–4	154	232	66.4	1,601	6.9	11	2	138.3	28	34	1.2	0
Career		42	31	16–15	694	1,122	61.9	7,956	7.1	60	15	136.4	255	250	1.0	6

== Personal life ==
Johnson is the son of Pro Bowl and Super Bowl quarterback Brad Johnson, the nephew of former Georgia and Miami head coach Mark Richt and the brother of former Texas A&M and current Auburn tight end Jake Johnson.
