= Jake Johnson (American football) =

American football player (born 2003)

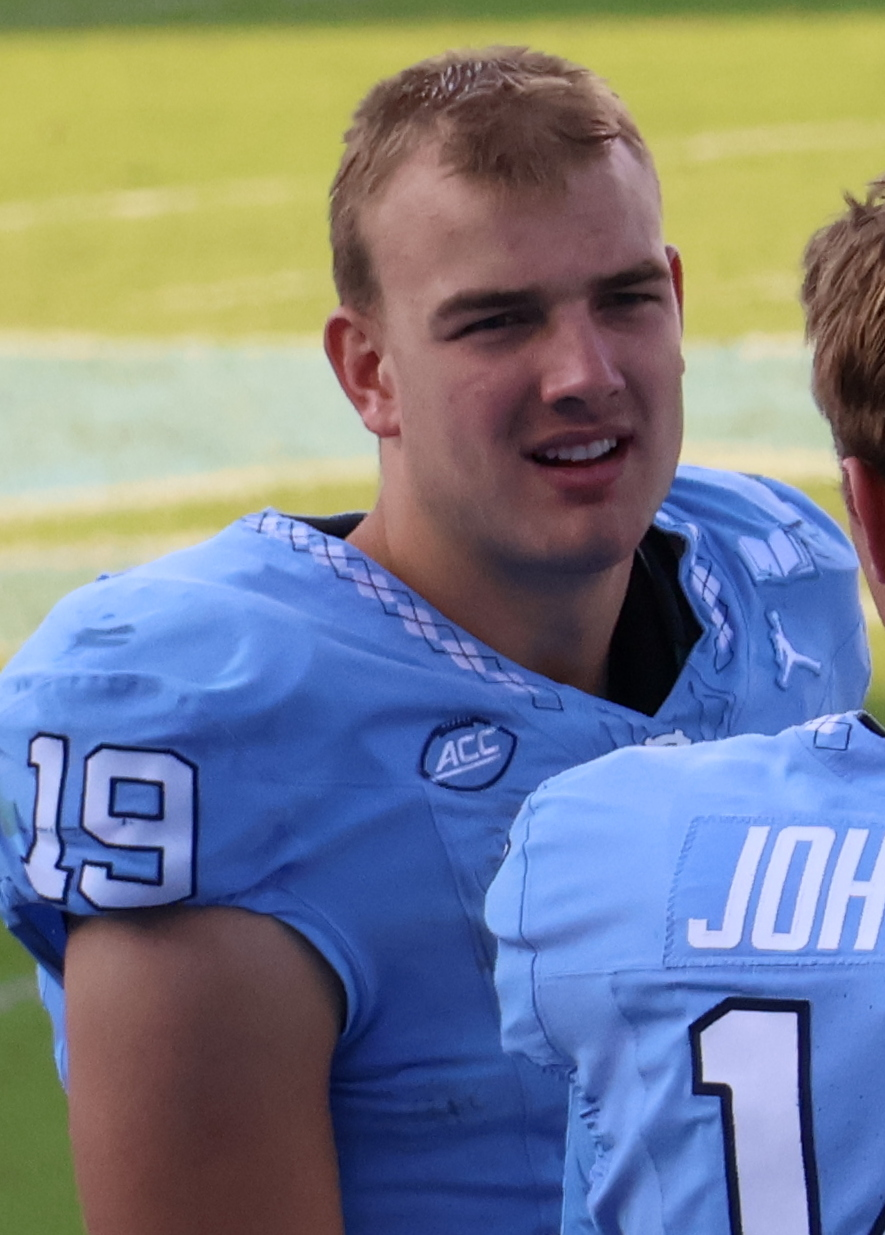
- Johnson with North Carolina in 2025

No. 19 – Auburn Tigers
- Position: Tight end
- Class: Redshirt Senior

Personal information
- Born: April 1, 2003 (age 23); Athens, Georgia, U.S.
- Listed height: 6 ft 6 in (1.98 m)
- Listed weight: 240 lb (109 kg)

Career information
- High school: Oconee County (Watkinsville, Georgia)
- College: Texas A&M (2022–2023); North Carolina (2024–2025); Auburn (2026–present)
- Stats at ESPN

Jake Johnson (born April 1, 2003) is an American college football tight end for the Auburn Tigers. He previously played for the Texas A&M Aggies from 2022 to 2023 and the North Carolina Tar Heels from 2024 to 2025.

== Early life ==
Johnson grew up in Athens, Georgia and attended Oconee County High School. He played with his older brother, quarterback Max Johnson, for his first two seasons of high school and caught 60 passes for 845 yards and 14 touchdowns during his sophomore season. Johnson had 37 receptions for 787 yards and 10 touchdowns as a junior. He caught 45 passes for 745 yards and eight touchdowns as a senior. After the season, Johnson played in the 2022 All-American Bowl.

Johnson was rated as a four-star recruit and the best tight end prospect in the 2022 recruiting class. He initially committed to play college football at LSU where his older brother Max was playing. Johnson later de-committed after his brother entered the NCAA transfer portal. He ultimately signed a letter of intent to play at Texas A&M. Max Johnson transferred to Texas A&M after his brother's commitment.

== College career ==
=== Texas A&M ===
Johnson joined the Texas A&M Aggies as an early enrollee in January 2022. He made his collegiate debut in the 2022 season opener against Sam Houston, recording his first collegiate reception on a two-yard catch thrown by his brother Max Johnson. He appeared in four games during the season and preserved his redshirt.

In the 2023 season, Johnson appeared in all 12 regular season games for the Aggies. In Week 3 against Louisiana–Monroe, he recorded a season-high six receptions for 36 yards in a 47–3 victory. The following week against Auburn, Johnson caught his first collegiate touchdown, a 22-yard reception from his brother Max, in a 27–10 victory. He finished the season with 24 receptions for 235 yards and four touchdowns. On December 4, Johnson entered the NCAA transfer portal, opting out of the Texas Bowl.

=== North Carolina ===
On December 18, 2023, Johnson transferred to North Carolina, joining his brother Max, who had committed to the Tar Heels on November 29. Johnson made his debut in the 2024 season opener against Minnesota, recording one reception for seven yards in a victory. He appeared in all 13 games, making one start. In the Fenway Bowl against UConn, he returned his first collegiate kickoff for 20 yards. Johnson finished the season with two receptions for 21 yards.

In the 2025 season opener against TCU, Johnson caught his first touchdown as a Tar Heel, a two-yard reception from his brother Max in a 48–14 loss. The game also marked Bill Belichick's debut as North Carolina's head coach. The brothers connected for four touchdowns during their collegiate careers. Johnson appeared in all 12 games during the season, making four starts, and recorded 16 receptions for 144 yards and one touchdown. On December 8, 2025, he entered the transfer portal for the second time.

=== Auburn ===
On January 10, 2026, Johnson transferred to Auburn.

=== Statistics ===
Year	Team	Games		Receiving			
Year	Team	GP	GS	Rec	Yds	Avg	TD
2022	Texas A&M	4	0	1	2	2.0	0
2023	Texas A&M	12	4	24	235	9.8	4
2024	North Carolina	13	1	2	21	10.5	0
2025	North Carolina	12	4	16	144	9.0	1
2026	Auburn	0	0	0	0	0.0	0
Career		41	9	43	402	9.3	5

== Personal life ==
Johnson is the son of former Florida State and NFL quarterback Brad Johnson and the nephew of former Georgia and Miami head coach Mark Richt.
