= Jelani Thurman =

American football player

No. 45 – North Carolina Tar Heels
- Position: Tight end
- Class: Redshirt Junior

Personal information
- Listed height: 6 ft 6 in (1.98 m)
- Listed weight: 250 lb (113 kg)

Career information
- High school: Langston Hughes (Fairburn, Georgia)
- College: Ohio State (2023–2025); North Carolina (2026–present)

Awards and highlights
- CFP national champion (2024)
- Stats at ESPN

Jelani Thurman is an American football tight end for the North Carolina Tar Heels. He previously played for the Ohio State Buckeyes.

== Early life ==
Thurman attended Langston Hughes High School in Fairburn, Georgia. He committed to play college football for the Ohio State Buckeyes over offers from other schools such as Alabama, Auburn, and Michigan State.

== College career ==
=== Ohio State ===
Thurman entered his freshman season in 2023 in line to compete for playing time. He played five games with one start in 2023. During the 2024 season, Thurman hauled in four passes for 42 yards and a touchdown. In 2025, he notched seven receptions for 84 yards and a touchdown. After the conclusion of the season, Thurman entered the NCAA transfer portal.

=== North Carolina ===
Thurman transferred to play for the North Carolina Tar Heels.

== Personal life ==
Thurman is the son of former NFL linebacker, Odell Thurman, and WNBA all-star, Kara Braxton.
