= Rabun Gap, Georgia =

- Unincorporated community
- Location within Georgia
- Coordinates: 34°57′26″N 83°23′11″W
- Country: United States
- State: Georgia
- County: Rabun
- Elevation: 2,142 ft (653 m)
- Time zone: UTC−5 (Eastern (EST))
  - Summer (DST): UTC−4 (EDT)
- ZIP Code: 30568
- Area codes: 706 & 762
- GNIS feature ID: 356484

Rabun Gap is an unincorporated community in Rabun County, Georgia, United States. The community is located along U.S. Route 23/441 south of Dillard. Rabun Gap has a post office with ZIP Code 30568.

The community takes its name from the mountain pass in which it is situated.
