= Xavier Lewis =

American football player

No. 90 – North Carolina Tar Heels
- Position: Defensive tackle
- Class: Sophomore

Personal information
- Listed height: 6 ft 0 in (1.83 m)
- Listed weight: 260 lb (118 kg)

Career information
- High school: Rolesville (Rolesville, North Carolina)
- College: North Carolina (2025–present)
- Stats at ESPN

Xavier Lewis is an American college football defensive tackle for the North Carolina Tar Heels.

== Early life ==
Lewis attended Leesville Road High School in Raleigh, North Carolina before transferring to Rolesville High School in Rolesville, North Carolina for his senior year. At Leesville, he was the Cap-6 Defensive Player of the Year his sophomore and junior seasons after recording a combined 14.5 sacks and one interception over the two years. As a senior at Rolesville he had 63 tackles and 3.5 sacks. Lewis originally committed to play college football at Austin Peay State University before deciding to play at the University of North Carolina at Chapel Hill as a walk-on.

== College career ==
As a freshman at North Carolina in 2025, Lewis played in 11 games and had eight tackles and 0.5 sacks. He entered his sophomore season in 2026 as a starter and recorded seven tackles and two sacks in the opener against the TCU Horned Frogs.
