= Demon June =

American football player

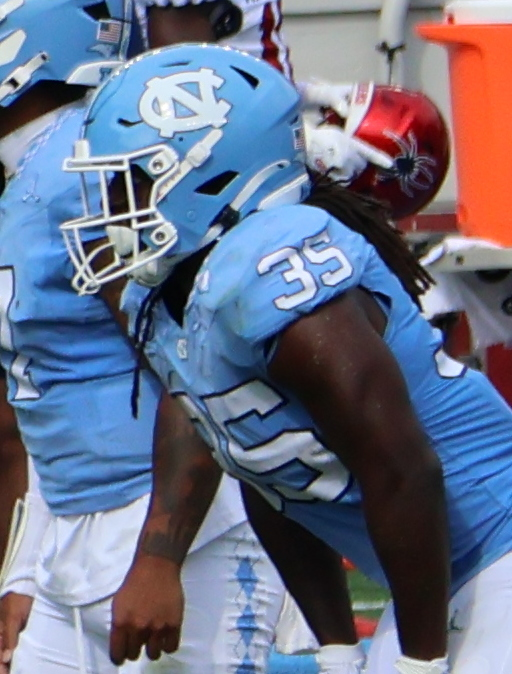
- June with North Carolina in 2025

No. 0 – North Carolina Tar Heels
- Position: Running back
- Class: Sophomore

Personal information
- Listed height: 5 ft 11 in (1.80 m)
- Listed weight: 215 lb (98 kg)

Career information
- High school: Jacksonville (Jacksonville, North Carolina)
- College: North Carolina (2025–present)

Demon June is an American college football running back for the North Carolina Tar Heels.

== Early life ==
June is from Jacksonville, North Carolina. He attended Jacksonville High School where he played football as a running back. He played as a starter in all four of his seasons there. June ran for 985 yards and 21 touchdowns as a freshman, then ran for 1,108 yards and 18 touchdowns as a sophomore.

As a junior, June was named the Jacksonville Daily News Player of the Year after running for 1,206 yards and 21 touchdowns. In a game during his senior year, he ran for over 400 yards and six touchdowns. He averaged nearly 10 yards per carry as a senior, finishing with 1,442 rushing yards and 24 touchdowns. He concluded his high school career with 4,741 rushing yards and 84 touchdowns, being named the conference player of the year twice. A three-star recruit, he committed to play college football for the North Carolina Tar Heels.

== College career ==
Upon his arrival at North Carolina in 2025, June was at the bottom of the depth chart. He worked his way up throughout practice and was named starter early in the season. In the third game of the season, he ran for 148 yards and a touchdown against Richmond, the most rushing yards in a game by a North Carolina freshman since 2017.
