= Khmori House =

American football player

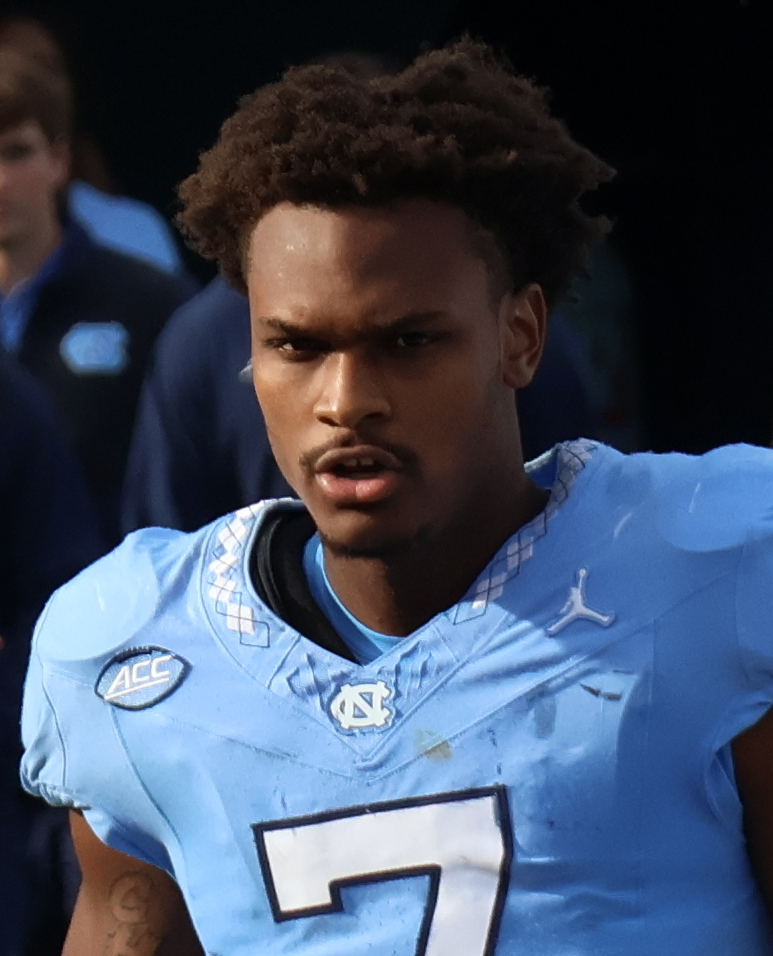
- House with North Carolina in 2025

No. 6 – Arkansas Razorbacks
- Position: Linebacker
- Class: Junior

Personal information
- Listed height: 6 ft 1 in (1.85 m)
- Listed weight: 202 lb (92 kg)

Career information
- High school: St. John Bosco (Bellflower, California)
- College: Washington (2024); North Carolina (2025); Arkansas (2026–present)
- Stats at ESPN

Khmori House is an American college football linebacker for the Arkansas Razorbacks. He previously played for the Washington Huskies and North Carolina Tar Heels.

== Early life ==
House attended St. John Bosco High School in Bellflower, California. He was rated as a four-star recruit and committed to play college football for the Washington Huskies over offers from schools such as Auburn, Colorado, and Texas.

== College career ==
=== Washington ===
In week 3 of the 2024 season, House made his first career start where he notched five tackles versus rivals Washington State. In week 4, he totaled three tackles and an interception in a win over Northwestern, earning Big Ten Conference freshman of the week honors. In week 11, late in the fourth quarter on 4th-and-goal at the 1-yard line, House made a huge tackle for loss to turn the ball over, helping the Huskies to a win over USC. He made five starts in 12 appearances that season, recording 33 tackles, four pass deflections, an interception, and a forced fumble. House was named a freshman all-American by College Football Network. After the season, he entered his name into the NCAA transfer portal.

=== North Carolina ===
House transferred to play for the North Carolina Tar Heels under new head coach Bill Belichick.
