= Jordan Shipp =

American football player

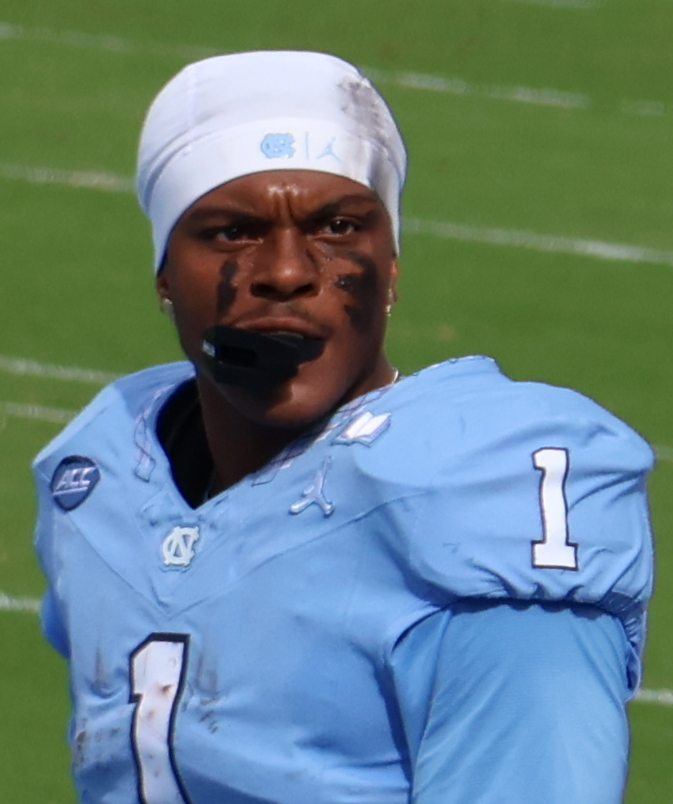
- Shipp with North Carolina in 2025

No. 1 – North Carolina Tar Heels
- Position: Wide receiver
- Class: Junior

Personal information
- Listed height: 6 ft 2 in (1.88 m)
- Listed weight: 190 lb (86 kg)

Career information
- High school: Providence Day (Charlotte, North Carolina)
- College: North Carolina (2024–present)
- Stats at ESPN

Jordan Shipp is an American college football wide receiver for the North Carolina Tar Heels.

== Early life ==
Shipp attended Providence Day School in Charlotte, North Carolina. During his high school career he had 173 receptions for 2,934 yards and 37 touchdowns. Shipp played in the 2024 All-American Bowl. He committed to the University of North Carolina at Chapel Hill to play college football.

== College career ==
Shipp played in 12 games as a true freshman at North Carolina in 2024, recording nine receptions for 114 yards and a touchdown. He became North Carolina's number one receiver his sophomore year in 2025.
