= Gio Lopez =

American football player

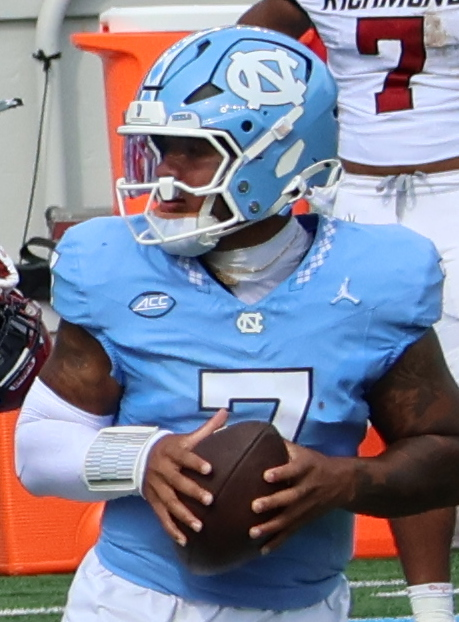
- Lopez with North Carolina in 2025

No. 3 – Wake Forest Demon Deacons
- Position: Quarterback
- Class: (redshirt) Junior

Personal information
- Listed height: 6 ft 0 in (1.83 m)
- Listed weight: 220 lb (100 kg)

Career information
- High school: James Clemens (Madison, Alabama)
- College: South Alabama (2023–2024); North Carolina (2025); Wake Forest (2026–present)
- Stats at ESPN

Giovanni Lopez is an American college football quarterback for the Wake Forest Demon Deacons. He previously played for the South Alabama Jaguars and North Carolina Tar Heels.

== Early life ==
Lopez attended James Clemens High School in Madison, Alabama. As a junior, he threw for 2,767 yards and 29 touchdowns, leading James Clemens to a ten-win season. A three-star recruit, Lopez committed to play college football at the University of South Alabama over offers from Charlotte, Jacksonville State, Troy, and UAB.

== College career ==
=== South Alabama ===
Lopez began his freshman season as a backup, before being named the starter against Troy. In his first career start, he threw 155 yards in a 28–10 defeat. In the 2023 68 Ventures Bowl, Lopez totaled 280 total yards and four total touchdowns, leading South Alabama to their first bowl game victory in program history, and being named the game's MVP. He finished his freshman season throwing for 475 yards and four touchdowns, in addition to running for 154 yards and two touchdowns. Entering the 2024 season, he was named the Jaguar's starting quarterback. In the season opener against North Texas, he threw for 432 yards and totaled four touchdowns, before being sidelined by a toe injury. He returned to action after missing one game. Against Appalachian State, Lopez totaled 259 yards and three total touchdowns in a 48–14 rout. Lopez finished the 2024 season, throwing for 2,559 yards and 18 touchdowns while also rushing for 463 yards and seven touchdowns. In April 2025, he entered the transfer portal during the spring window.

=== North Carolina ===
On April 17, 2025, Lopez announced his decision to transfer to the University of North Carolina at Chapel Hill to play for the North Carolina Tar Heels. On August 27, he was named the Tar Heels' starting quarterback under first-year head coach Bill Belichick. Lopez started 11 games for North Carolina, recording 1,747 passing yards, 10 touchdowns, and five interceptions. On January 5, 2026, he announced that he would enter the transfer portal for the second time.

=== Wake Forest ===
On January 7, 2026, Lopez announced his decision to transfer to Wake Forest University to play for the Wake Forest Demon Deacons. In his Wake Forest debut against Akron, Lopez threw for 350 yards and three touchdowns to lead the Demon Deacons to a 38–16 victory. Against Stanford, he threw for 265 yards, rushed for 88 yards and accounted for five touchdowns, including two passing and three rushing, in Wake Forest's 57–3 victory, a 54-point margin that was the largest against an ACC opponent in program history. In November, Lopez was named a semifinalist for the Walter Camp Award.

=== Statistics ===
| Season | Team | Games | | | Passing | | | | | | | | Rushing | | | |
| Season | Team | GP | GS | Record | Cmp | Att | Pct | Yds | Y/A | TD | Int | Rtg | Att | Yds | Avg | TD |
|---|---|---|---|---|---|---|---|---|---|---|---|---|---|---|---|---|
| 2023 | South Alabama | 5 | 1 | 0–1 | 41 | 61 | 67.2 | 475 | 7.8 | 4 | 2 | 147.7 | 18 | 154 | 8.6 | 2 |
| 2024 | South Alabama | 11 | 11 | 6–5 | 206 | 312 | 66.0 | 2,559 | 8.2 | 18 | 5 | 150.8 | 83 | 465 | 5.6 | 7 |
| 2025 | North Carolina | 11 | 11 | 4–7 | 170 | 261 | 65.1 | 1,747 | 6.7 | 10 | 5 | 130.2 | 86 | 133 | 1.5 | 3 |
| 2026 | Wake Forest | 11 | 11 | 10–1 | 184 | 275 | 66.9 | 2,701 | 9.8 | 21 | 1 | 173.6 | 90 | 369 | 4.1 | 10 |
| Career | | 38 | 34 | 20−14 | 601 | 909 | 66.1 | 7,482 | 8.2 | 53 | 13 | 151.6 | 277 | 1,121 | 4.0 | 22 |
