= 2026 California Golden Bears football team =

American college football season

2026 California Golden Bears football
- Conference: Atlantic Coast Conference
- Record: 3–8 (2–6 ACC)
- Head coach: Tosh Lupoi (1st season)
- Offensive coordinator: Jordan Somerville (1st season)
- Co-offensive coordinator: Ike Hilliard (1st season)
- Offensive scheme: Pro-style
- Defensive coordinator: Michael Hutchings (1st season)
- Co-defensive coordinator: Da'Von Brown (1st season)
- Base defense: Multiple 3–4
- Home stadium: California Memorial Stadium

Uniform

2026 Atlantic Coast Conference football standings
| | Conf. | | | Overall |
| Team | W | | L | W | | L |
|---|---|---|---|---|---|---|
| No. 7 Miami (FL) y | 8 | – | 0 | 10 | – | 1 |
| No. 11 Wake Forest y | 7 | – | 1 | 10 | – | 1 |
| No. 23 Louisville | 7 | – | 2 | 8 | – | 3 |
| Clemson | 5 | – | 3 | 7 | – | 4 |
| SMU | 5 | – | 3 | 7 | – | 4 |
| Duke | 4 | – | 4 | 7 | – | 4 |
| Stanford | 4 | – | 4 | 6 | – | 5 |
| Virginia | 4 | – | 4 | 6 | – | 5 |
| Boston College | 3 | – | 4 | 5 | – | 6 |
| Pittsburgh | 3 | – | 5 | 6 | – | 5 |
| Virginia Tech | 3 | – | 5 | 6 | – | 5 |
| NC State | 3 | – | 5 | 5 | – | 6 |
| Florida State | 3 | – | 5 | 5 | – | 6 |
| Syracuse | 3 | – | 6 | 5 | – | 6 |
| North Carolina | 2 | – | 5 | 5 | – | 6 |
| California | 2 | – | 6 | 3 | – | 8 |
| Georgia Tech | 2 | – | 6 | 3 | – | 8 |
Championship: Miami (FL) vs. Wake Forest
^ – College Football Playoff participant; $ – Conference champion; y – Championship game participant; As of November 22, 2026; Rankings from CFP rankings

The 2026 California Golden Bears football team represents the University of California, Berkeley in the Atlantic Coast Conference (ACC) during the 2026 NCAA Division I FBS football season. The Golden Bears are led by Tosh Lupoi in his first year as the head coach. The Golden Bears play their home games at California Memorial Stadium located in Berkeley, California.

== Schedule ==
| Date | Time | Opponent | Site | TV | Result | Attendance |
|---|---|---|---|---|---|---|
| September 5 | 7:30 p.m. | UCLA* | California Memorial Stadium; Berkeley, CA (rivalry) | ESPN | L 24–45 | 54,283 |
| September 12 | 12:30 p.m. | at Syracuse | JMA Wireless Dome; Syracuse, NY | ACCN | W 21–18 | 36,031 |
| September 19 | 12:30 p.m. | Wagner* | California Memorial Stadium; Berkeley, CA | ACCN | W 49–7 | 35,586 |
| September 25 | 7:30 p.m. | Clemson | California Memorial Stadium; Berkeley, CA | ESPN | L 10–24 | 41,778 |
| October 3 | 12:30 p.m. | at UNLV* | Allegiant Stadium; Paradise, NV | CBSSN | L 31–39 | 30,632 |
| October 10 | 12:30 p.m. | Virginia Tech^{†} | California Memorial Stadium; Berkeley, CA | ACCN | W 25–20 | 40,170 |
| October 17 | 7:30 p.m. | No. 21 Wake Forest | California Memorial Stadium; Berkeley, CA | ESPN2 | L 7–41 | 34,850 |
| October 24 | 9:00 a.m. | at No. 23 SMU | Gerald J. Ford Stadium; University Park, TX | The CW | L 20–59 | 26,463 |
| October 31 | 9:00 a.m. | at NC State | Carter–Finley Stadium; Raleigh, NC | ACCN | L 10–31 | 52,933 |
| November 14 | 12:30 p.m. | at Virginia | Scott Stadium; Charlottesville, VA | ACCN | L 7–36 | 39,423 |
| November 21 | 4:30 p.m. | Stanford | California Memorial Stadium; Berkeley, CA (Big Game) | ACCN | L 28–44 | 54,283 |
| November 28 | 4:30 p.m. | Pittsburgh | California Memorial Stadium; Berkeley, CA | ACCN | | |
*Non-conference game; ^{†}Homecoming; Rankings from AP Poll (and CFP Rankings, after November 3) – Released prior to game; All times are in Pacific time

== Offseason ==
=== Coaching staff changes ===
==== Additions ====
| Name | Position | Prev. team | Prev. position |

==== Departures ====
| Name | Position | New team | New position |

=== Transfers ===
==== Incoming ====
Incoming transfers
| Name | Pos. | Height | Weight | Hometown | Prev. school |
|---|---|---|---|---|---|
| Solomon Williams | EDGE | 6'2" | 255 lbs | Tampa, FL | Texas A&M |
| Jacob Arop | OT | 6'5.5" | 260 lbs | Bellevue, NE | South Dakota |
| Ian Strong | WR | 6'4" | 190 lbs | Middle Island, NY | Rutgers |
| Kingston Lopa | S | 6'3" | 195 lbs | Sacramento, CA | Oregon |
| Adam Mohammed | RB | 6'0" | 180 lbs | Glendale, AZ | Washington |
| Dorian Thomas | TE | 6'4" | 215 lbs | Kent, WA | New Mexico |
| Ashten Emory | RB | 5'11" | 185 lbs | Dallas, TX | UTEP |
| Carter Vargas | RB | 5'11" | 190 lbs | Santa Maria, CA | UC Davis |
| Mykeal Rabess | OT | 6'7" | 320 lbs | Miami, FL | FIU |
| Chase Hendricks | WR | 5'10" | 182 lbs | St. Louis, MO | Ohio |
| Michael Hurst Jr. | S | 6'0" | 185 lbs | Los Angeles, CA | Northern Arizona |
| Tristan Jernigan | LB | 6'0.5" | 215 lbs | Tupelo, MS | Texas A&M |
| Jimothy Lewis | OT | 6'5" | 300 lbs | Madison, MS | Mississippi State |
| Ashun Shepphard | DL | 6'3" | 285 lbs | Louisville, MS | Mississippi State |
| Justin Beadles | DL | 6'6" | 232 lbs | Tyrone, GA | Louisville |
| Towns McGough | K | 6'0" | 180 lbs | Auburn, AL | Auburn |
| Marquis Groves-Killebrew | CB | 6'0" | 172 lbs | Snellville, GA | Arizona |
| Cooper Perry | WR | 6'0.5" | 185 lbs | Scottsdale, AZ | Oregon |
| Kahlee Tafai | IOL | 6'6" | 300 lbs | Lawndale, CA | Minnesota |
| Ashton Rivera | IOL | 6'2" | 310 lbs | Cape Coral, FL | Kent State |
| Daniel Harris | CB | 6'2" | 175 lbs | Miami, FL | Georgia |
| Angus Davies | P | 6'1" | 195 lbs | Victoria, AUS | Tulsa |
| Emmanuel Okoye | EDGE | 6'5" | 228 lbs | London, England | Tennessee |
| Jayden Williams | DL | 6'2" | 285 lbs | Monroe, LA | North Texas |
| Jackson Brousseau | QB | 6'3" | 209 lbs | Lehi, UT | Colorado State |
| Jericho Johnson | DL | 6'3" | 360 lbs | Fairfield, CA | Oregon |
| Ricky Fletcher | CB | 6'2" | 175 lbs | Lexington, MS | Ole Miss |
| Joshua Pierce | EDGE | 6'4" | 260 lbs | Grosse Pointe, MI | North Texas |
| Kamar Mothudi | LB | 6'3" | 225 lbs | Los Angeles, CA | Oregon |
| AJ Tuitele | LB | 6'3" | 205 lbs | North Las Vegas, NV | USC |
| Rico Walker | TE | 6'3" | 234 lbs | Hickory, NC | Purdue |
| David Bird | LS | 6'0" | 200 lbs | Phoenix, AZ | Alabama |

==== Outgoing ====
Outgoing transfers
| Name | Pos. | Height | Weight | Hometown | New school |
|---|---|---|---|---|---|
| Abram Murray | K | 6'1" | 180 lbs | Shreveport, LA | Louisiana–Monroe |
| Syris Corley | OT | 6'5" | 275 lbs | Taylor, TX | TBD |
| Michael Kern | P | 6'3" | 170 lbs | Fort Lauderdale, FL | New Mexico |
| Ben Marshall | TE | 6'5" | 220 lbs | Murfreesboro, TN | Austin Peay |
| Belay Brummel | QB | 6'2" | 180 lbs | Chicago, IL | TBD |
| Aidan Keanaaina | DL | 6'3" | 292 lbs | Denver, CO | TBD |
| Jayden Dixon-Veal | WR | 6'0" | 185 lbs | Rancho Cucamonga, CA | TBD |
| Myles Reber | WR | 5'10" | 185 lbs | Santa Cruz, CA | TBD |
| Jordan Spasojevic-Moko | IOL | 6'5" | 300 lbs | Brisbane, AUS | Paris Musketeers |
| Lajuan Owens | OT | 6'4" | 325 lbs | Keller, TX | Central Arkansas |
| Dazmin James | WR | 6'1" | 180 lbs | Clayton, NC | Appalachian State |
| Brook Honore | P | 6'0" | 185 lbs | Manvel, TX | South Dakota |
| Isaac Torres | WR | 6'4" | 210 lbs | Santa Rosa, CA | TBD |
| Ryan McCulloch | EDGE | 6'3" | 235 lbs | Arcadia, CA | UCLA |
| Luke Ferrelli | LB | 6'3" | 215 lbs | Carlsbad, CA | Ole Miss |
| Eze Osondu | LB | 6'3" | 215 lbs | Trophy Club, TX | UTSA |
| TJ Bush | EDGE | 6'3" | 250 lbs | Woodbridge, VA | Minnesota |
| Braden Miller | OT | 6'7" | 285 lbs | Aurora, CO | Duke |
| Curlee Thomas | LB | 6'4" | 240 lbs | Fort Worth, TX | North Texas |
| Rino Monteforte | LS | 5'9" | 215 lbs | Uniondale, NY | Kansas |
| Ike Okafor | DL | 6'4" | 255 lbs | Houston, TX | Washington State |
| Landon Morris | TE | 6'5" | 240 lbs | Fishers, IN | Wake Forest |
| Nick Morrow | OT | 6'8" | 315 lbs | Flagstaff, AZ | Kansas |
| Buom Jock | LB | 6'5" | 203 lbs | Alexandria, VA | Wake Forest |
| Tyson Ford | DL | 6'4.2" | 265 lbs | St. Louis, MO | UCLA |
| Kendrick Raphael | RB | 5'10" | 187 lbs | Naples, FL | SMU |
| Cade Uluave | LB | 6'1" | 235 lbs | Herriman, UT | BYU |
| Devin Brown | QB | 6'2.5" | 196 lbs | Draper, UT | Weber State |
| Brandon High | RB | 5'10" | 204 lbs | Spring, TX | UTSA |
| Daveion Harley | IOL | 6'2" | 300 lbs | Quincy, FL | FIU |
| Kaden Cook | CB | 6'0" | 170 lbs | Round Rock, TX | Jacksonville State |
| Leon Bell | OT | 6'8" | 300 lbs | Dickinson, TX | Colorado |
| Jaiven Plummer | WR | 6'3" | 194 lbs | Alexandria, VA | Georgia Tech |
| Jacob Houseworth | TE | 6'4" | 225 lbs | Fortuna, CA | UC Davis |
| Harrison Taggart | LB | 6'2" | 200 lbs | Draper, UT | Utah State |

=== NFL draft ===
2026 NFL draft class
| Player | Round | Pick No. | Position | Team | Source |
|---|---|---|---|---|---|
| Hezekiah Masses | 5 | 175 | CB | Las Vegas Raiders | |

=== Recruiting class ===
College recruiting
| Name | Hometown | School | Height | Weight | Commit date |
|---|---|---|---|---|---|
Overall recruit ranking:
Note: In many cases, Scout, Rivals, 247Sports, On3, and ESPN may conflict in their listings of height and weight.; In these cases, the average was taken. ESPN grades are on a 100-point scale.; Sources: "2026 Team Ranking". Rivals.com.

== Game summaries ==
=== vs. UCLA (rivalry) ===
UCLA Bruins (0–0) at California Golden Bears (0–0) – Game summary

| Quarter | 1 | 2 | 3 | 4 | Total |
|---|---|---|---|---|---|
| Bruins | 7 | 17 | 0 | 21 | 45 |
| Golden Bears | 7 | 10 | 7 | 0 | 24 |

at California Memorial Stadium • Berkeley, California

- Date: September 5
- Game time: 7:30 p.m. PDT
- Game weather: Sunny • Temperature: 70 °F (21 °C)
- Game attendance: 54,283
- Referee: Francisco Villar
- TV announcers (ESPN): Tom Hart, Roddy Jones and Quint Kessenich

Game information

First quarter

- CAL – Chase Hendricks 9-yard pass from Jaron-Keawe Sagapolutele (Towns McGough kick), 10:28. Golden Bears 7–0. Drive: 10 plays, 75 yards, 4:32.
- UCLA – Nico Iamaleava 9-yard run (Mateen Bhaghani kick), 7:00. Tied 7–7. Drive: 7 plays, 71 yards, 3:21.

Second quarter

- CAL – Towns McGough 28-yard field goal, 12:46. Golden Bears 10–7. Drive: 13 plays, 61 yards, 5:10.
- UCLA – Anthony Woods 31-yard run (Mateen Bhaghani kick), 10:19. Bruins 14–10. Drive: 5 plays, 75 yards, 2:27.
- UCLA – Wayne Knight 8-yard run (Mateen Bhaghani kick), 3:23. Bruins 21–10. Drive: 9 plays, 76 yards, 4:46.
- CAL – Mason Mini 8-yard pass from Jaron-Keawe Sagapolutele (Towns McGough kick), 0:13. Bruins 21–17. Drive: 5 plays, 87 yards, 0:38.
- UCLA – Mateen Bhaghani 38-yard field goal, 0:03. Bruins 24–17. Drive: 2 plays, 43 yards, 0:09.

Third quarter

- CAL – Adam Mohammed 1-yard run (Towns McGough kick), 3:50. Tied 24–24. Drive: 14 plays, 85 yards, 8:28.

Fourth quarter

- UCLA – Wayne Knight 31-yard run (Mateen Bhaghani kick), 8:46. Bruins 31–24. Drive: 1 play, 31 yards, 0:07.
- UCLA – Wayne Knight 4-yard run (Mateen Bhaghani kick), 2:58. Bruins 38–24. Drive: 8 plays, 46 yards, 4:03.
- UCLA – Anthony Woods 53-yard run (Mateen Bhaghani kick), 1:17. Bruins 45–24. Drive: 1 play, 53 yards, 0:09.

| Statistics | UCLA | CAL |
|---|---|---|
| First downs | 20 | 23 |
| Plays–yards | 54–461 | 87–410 |
| Rushes–yards | 277 | 119 |
| Passing yards | 184 | 291 |
| Passing: comp–att–int | 14–22–1 | 26–47–2 |
| Turnovers | 1 | 3 |
| Time of possession | 25:11 | 34:49 |

| Team | Category | Player | Statistics |
|---|---|---|---|
| UCLA | Passing | Nico Iamaleava | 14/22, 184 yards, INT |
| UCLA | Rushing | Anthony Woods | 8 carries, 118 yards, 2 TD |
| UCLA | Receiving | Mikey Matthews | 4 receptions, 88 yards |
| California | Passing | Jaron-Keawe Sagapolutele | 24/41, 271 yards, 2 TD, 2 INT |
| California | Rushing | Adam Mohammed | 28 carries, 120 yards, TD |
| California | Receiving | Ian Strong | 5 receptions, 94 yards |

=== at Syracuse ===
California Golden Bears (0–1) at Syracuse Orange (1–0) – Game summary

| Quarter | 1 | 2 | 3 | 4 | Total |
|---|---|---|---|---|---|
| Golden Bears | 0 | 7 | 7 | 7 | 21 |
| Orange | 3 | 9 | 6 | 0 | 18 |

at JMA Wireless Dome • Syracuse, New York

- Date: September 12
- Game time: 12:30 p.m. PDT
- Game weather: none (played indoors)
- Game attendance: 36,031
- Referee: Jon Noli
- TV announcers (ACCN): Jorge Sedano, Rodney McLeod Jr. and Kendra Douglas

Game information

First quarter

- SYR – Tripp Woody 25-yard field goal, 12:37. Orange 3–0. Drive: 6 plays, 57 yards, 2:17.

Second quarter

- SYR – Tripp Woody 33-yard field goal, 14:44. Orange 6–0. Drive: 12 plays, 45 yards, 4:14.
- SYR – Daunte Bacheyie 23-yard pass from Steve Angeli (run failed), 8:50. Orange 12–0. Drive: 5 plays, 72 yards, 2:26.
- CAL – Chase Hendricks 14-yard pass from Jaron-Keawe Sagapolutele (Towns McGough kick), 7:15. Orange 12–7. Drive: 4 plays, 75 yards, 1:35.

Third quarter

- CAL – Jordan King 2-yard pass from Jaron-Keawe Sagapolutele (Towns McGough kick), 7:15. Golden Bears 14–12. Drive: 6 plays, 29 yards, 3:07.
- SYR – Ju'Juan Johnson 2-yard run (run failed), 1:38. Orange 18–14. Drive: 13 plays, 75 yards, 5:37.

Fourth quarter

- CAL – Kingston Lopa 24-yard interception return (Towns McGough kick), 4:51. Golden Bears 21–18.

| Statistics | CAL | SYR |
|---|---|---|
| First downs | 16 | 27 |
| Plays–yards | 60–249 | 86–436 |
| Rushes–yards | 26–67 | 36–118 |
| Passing yards | 182 | 318 |
| Passing: comp–att–int | 21–34–0 | 25–50–3 |
| Turnovers | 0 | 3 |
| Time of possession | 25:50 | 34:10 |

| Team | Category | Player | Statistics |
|---|---|---|---|
| California | Passing | Jaron-Keawe Sagapolutele | 21/34, 182 yards, 2 TD |
| California | Rushing | Adam Mohammed | 19 carries, 74 yards |
| California | Receiving | Ian Strong | 3 receptions, 64 yards |
| Syracuse | Passing | Steve Angeli | 24/49, 306 yards, TD, 3 INT |
| Syracuse | Rushing | Tylik Hill | 2 carries, 56 yards |
| Syracuse | Receiving | Justus Ross-Simmons | 6 receptions, 105 yards |

=== vs. Wagner (FCS) ===
Wagner Seahawks (FCS) (1-2) at California Golden Bears (1–1) – Game summary

| Quarter | 1 | 2 | 3 | 4 | Total |
|---|---|---|---|---|---|
| Seahawks (FCS) | 0 | 7 | 0 | 0 | 7 |
| Golden Bears | 29 | 10 | 7 | 3 | 49 |

at California Memorial Stadium • Berkeley, California

- Date: September 19
- Game time: 12:30 p.m. PDT
- Game weather: Sunny • Temperature: 70 °F (21 °C)
- Game attendance: 35,586
- Referee: Darryl DeBerry
- TV announcers (ACCNX): Roxy Bernstein, Dave Clawson and Madison Hock

| Statistics | WAG | CAL |
|---|---|---|
| First downs | 10 | 28 |
| Plays–yards | 59–198 | 71–626 |
| Rushes–yards | 27–112 | 28–134 |
| Passing yards | 86 | 492 |
| Passing: comp–att–int | 15–32–1 | 35–43–0 |
| Turnovers | 1 | 2 |
| Time of possession | 28:08 | 31:52 |

| Team | Category | Player | Statistics |
|---|---|---|---|
| Wagner | Passing | Benjamin Newman | 15/31, 86 yards, TD, INT |
| Wagner | Rushing | Shawn James | 8 carries, 36 yards |
| Wagner | Receiving | Jeremiah Colclough | 3 receptions, 24 yards |
| California | Passing | Jaron-Keawe Sagapolutele | 27/33, 413 yards, 3 TD |
| California | Rushing | Adam Mohammed | 13 carries, 91 yards, 2 TD |
| California | Receiving | Kylon Grayes | 3 receptions, 98 yards, TD |

=== vs. Clemson ===
Clemson Tigers (2–1) at California Golden Bears (2–1) – Game summary

| Quarter | 1 | 2 | 3 | 4 | Total |
|---|---|---|---|---|---|
| Tigers | 0 | 10 | 7 | 7 | 24 |
| Golden Bears | 7 | 0 | 3 | 0 | 10 |

at California Memorial Stadium • Berkeley, California

- Date: September 25
- Game time: 7:30 p.m. PDT
- Game weather: Sunny • Temperature: 65 °F (18 °C) • Wind: N at 4 miles per hour (6.4 km/h)
- Game attendance: 41,778
- Referee: Nate Black
- TV announcers (ESPN): Mike Monaco, Jordan Rodgers and Dana Boyle

| Statistics | CLEM | CAL |
|---|---|---|
| First downs | 23 | 13 |
| Plays–yards | 70–363 | 57–231 |
| Rushes–yards | 49–255 | 27–86 |
| Passing yards | 108 | 145 |
| Passing: comp–att–int | 13–21–1 | 17–30–2 |
| Turnovers | 2 | 2 |
| Time of possession | 34:07 | 25:53 |

| Team | Category | Player | Statistics |
|---|---|---|---|
| Clemson | Passing | Tait Reynolds | 13/21, 108 yards, INT |
| Clemson | Rushing | Gideon Davidson | 22 carries, 159 yards, 2 TD |
| Clemson | Receiving | Tyler Brown | 3 receptions, 29 yards |
| California | Passing | Jaron-Keawe Sagapolutele | 16/29, 119 yards, 2 INT |
| California | Rushing | Adam Mohammed | 13 carries, 51 yards |
| California | Receiving | Chase Hendricks | 4 receptions, 37 yards |

=== at UNLV ===
California Golden Bears (2–2) at UNLV Rebels (2–2) – Game summary

| Quarter | 1 | 2 | 3 | 4 | Total |
|---|---|---|---|---|---|
| Golden Bears | 7 | 0 | 11 | 13 | 31 |
| Rebels | 7 | 17 | 0 | 15 | 39 |

at Allegiant Stadium • Paradise, Nevada

- Date: October 3
- Game time: 12:30 p.m. PDT
- Game weather: None (indoor stadium)
- Game attendance: 30,632
- Referee: Brad Carrell
- TV announcers (CBSSN): John Sadak, Randy Cross, and Hailey Sutton

| Statistics | CAL | UNLV |
|---|---|---|
| First downs | 20 | 18 |
| Plays–yards | 83–464 | 61–345 |
| Rushes–yards | 24–69 | 38–173 |
| Passing yards | 395 | 172 |
| Passing: comp–att–int | 38–59–1 | 11–23–1 |
| Time of possession | 31:17 | 28:43 |

| Team | Category | Player | Statistics |
|---|---|---|---|
| California | Passing | Jackson Brosseau | 19/32, 200 yards, 2 TD |
| California | Rushing | Ashten Emory | 12 carries, 56 yards, TD |
| California | Receiving | Taimane Purcell | 3 receptions, 102 yards, TD |
| UNLV | Passing | Jackson Arnold | 11/22, 172 yards, 3 TD |
| UNLV | Rushing | Jackson Arnold | 15 carries, 143 yards, 2 TD |
| UNLV | Receiving | Kayden McGee | 3 receptions, 85 yards, TD |

=== vs. Virginia Tech ===
Virginia Tech Hokies (4–1) at California Golden Bears (2–3) – Game summary

| Quarter | 1 | 2 | 3 | 4 | Total |
|---|---|---|---|---|---|
| Hokies | 0 | 14 | 0 | 6 | 20 |
| Golden Bears | 0 | 10 | 3 | 12 | 25 |

at California Memorial Stadium • Berkeley, California

- Date: October 10
- Game time: 12:30 PM Pacific
- Game weather: Sunny • Temperature: 63 °F • Wind: SW at 11 miles per hour
- Game attendance: 40,170
- Referee: Tim Hedgepeth
- TV announcers (ACCN): Justin Kutcher, Max Browne, and Madison Fitzpatrick

| Statistics | VT | CAL |
|---|---|---|
| First downs | 25 | 24 |
| Plays–yards | 63–401 | 69–403 |
| Rushes–yards | 32–113 | 26–82 |
| Passing yards | 288 | 321 |
| Passing: comp–att–int | 21–31–0 | 29–43–0 |
| Turnovers | 0 | 0 |
| Time of possession | 29:43 | 30:17 |

| Team | Category | Player | Statistics |
|---|---|---|---|
| Virginia Tech | Passing | Ethan Grunkemeyer | 21/31, 288 yards, TD |
| Virginia Tech | Rushing | Jeffrey Overton Jr. | 12 carries, 73 yards |
| Virginia Tech | Receiving | Que'Sean Brown | 7 receptions, 63 yards |
| California | Passing | Jackson Brousseau | 29/43, 321 yards, TD |
| California | Rushing | Ashten Emory | 19 carries, 46 yards, 2 TD |
| California | Receiving | Ian Strong | 5 receptions, 97 yards |

=== vs. No. 21 Wake Forest ===
No. 21 Wake Forest Demon Deacons (5–1) at California Golden Bears (3–3) – Game summary

| Quarter | 1 | 2 | 3 | 4 | Total |
|---|---|---|---|---|---|
| No. 21 Demon Deacons | 14 | 20 | 7 | 0 | 41 |
| Golden Bears | 0 | 0 | 0 | 7 | 7 |

at California Memorial Stadium • Berkeley, California

- Date: October 17
- Game time: 7:30 p.m. PDT
- Game weather: Clear • Temperature: 68 °F (20 °C) • Wind: SE at 5 miles per hour (8.0 km/h)
- Referee: Nolan Dumas
- TV announcers (ESPN2): Chuckie Kempf, Dustin Fox, and Lauren Sisler

| Statistics | WAKE | CAL |
|---|---|---|
| First downs | 24 | 20 |
| Plays–yards | 62–509 | 68–266 |
| Rushes–yards | 36–220 | 21–75 |
| Passing yards | 289 | 191 |
| Passing: comp–att–int | 19–26–0 | 32–47–0 |
| Turnovers | 0 | 0 |
| Time of possession | 27:52 | 32:08 |

| Team | Category | Player | Statistics |
|---|---|---|---|
| Wake Forest | Passing | Gio Lopez | 16/23, 267 yards, 4 TD |
| Wake Forest | Rushing | Jamar Searcy | 5 carries, 61 yards, TD |
| Wake Forest | Receiving | Dominick Barry | 4 receptions, 102 yards, 3 TD |
| California | Passing | Jaron-Keawe Sagapolutele | 15/18, 110 yards, TD |
| California | Rushing | Ashten Emory | 12 carries, 56 yards |
| California | Receiving | Chase Hendricks | 8 receptions, 54 yards |

=== at No. 23 SMU ===
California Golden Bears (3–4) at No. 23 SMU Mustangs (5–1) – Game summary

| Quarter | 1 | 2 | 3 | 4 | Total |
|---|---|---|---|---|---|
| Golden Bears | 7 | 13 | 0 | 0 | 20 |
| No. 23 Mustangs | 10 | 7 | 21 | 21 | 59 |

at Gerald J. Ford Stadium • University Park, Texas

- Date: October 24
- Game time: TBD
- Game weather: Sunny
- Game attendance: 26,463
- Referee: Nate Black
- TV announcers (The CW): Thom Brennaman, Jason Cabinda, and Wes Bryant

| Statistics | CAL | SMU |
|---|---|---|
| First downs | 16 | 31 |
| Plays–yards | 66–305 | 68–492 |
| Rushes–yards | 28–40 | 44–256 |
| Passing yards | 265 | 236 |
| Passing: comp–att–int | 27–38–0 | 17–24–0 |
| Time of possession | 31:22 | 28:38 |

| Team | Category | Player | Statistics |
|---|---|---|---|
| California | Passing | Jaron-Keawe Sagapolutele | 27/37, 265 yards, TD |
| California | Rushing | Ashten Emory | 14 carries, 27 yards |
| California | Receiving | Chase Hendricks | 7 receptions, 83 yards, TD |
| SMU | Passing | Kevin Jennings | 16/23, 223 yards, 3 TD |
| SMU | Rushing | Kendrick Raphael | 22 carries, 104 yards, 2 TD |
| SMU | Receiving | Jalen Cooper | 2 receptions, 37 yards |

=== at NC State ===
California Golden Bears (3–5) at NC State Wolfpack (3–4) – Game summary

| Quarter | 1 | 2 | 3 | 4 | Total |
|---|---|---|---|---|---|
| Golden Bears | 0 | 10 | 0 | 0 | 10 |
| Wolfpack | 7 | 3 | 14 | 7 | 31 |

at Carter–Finley Stadium • Raleigh, North Carolina

- Date: October 31
- Game time: TBD
- Game weather: Sunny
- Game attendance: 52,933
- Referee: Darryl DeBerry

| Statistics | CAL | NCSU |
|---|---|---|
| First downs | 15 | 19 |
| Plays–yards | 72–269 | 65–327 |
| Rushes–yards | 27–73 | 40–135 |
| Passing yards | 196 | 192 |
| Passing: comp–att–int | 29–45–1 | 13–25–0 |
| Time of possession | 31:29 | 28:31 |

| Team | Category | Player | Statistics |
|---|---|---|---|
| California | Passing | Jaron–Keawe Sagapolutele | 29/45, 196 yards, TD, INT |
| California | Rushing | Anthony League | 3 carries, 29 yards |
| California | Receiving | Chase Hendricks | 7 receptions, 67 yards, TD |
| NC State | Passing | CJ Bailey | 13/25, 192 yards, 2 TD |
| NC State | Rushing | Davion Gause | 19 carries, 104 yards, TD |
| NC State | Receiving | Chance Robinson | 4 receptions, 76 yards, TD |

=== at Virginia ===
California Golden Bears (3–6) at Virginia Cavaliers (4–5) – Game summary

| Quarter | 1 | 2 | 3 | 4 | Total |
|---|---|---|---|---|---|
| Golden Bears | 0 | 7 | 0 | 0 | 7 |
| Cavaliers | 6 | 10 | 10 | 10 | 36 |

at Scott Stadium • Charlottesville, Virginia

- Date: November 14
- Game time: TBD
- Game weather: Sunny
- Game attendance: 39,423
- Referee: Nate Black

| Statistics | CAL | UVA |
|---|---|---|
| First downs | 17 | 20 |
| Plays–yards | 60–201 | 69–424 |
| Rushes–yards | 25–42 | 36–201 |
| Passing yards | 159 | 223 |
| Passing: comp–att–int | 19–35–3 | 21–33–0 |
| Time of possession | 25:12 | 34:48 |

| Team | Category | Player | Statistics |
|---|---|---|---|
| California | Passing | Jaron–Keawe Sagapolutele | 16/30, 141 yards, 2 INT |
| California | Rushing | Adam Mohammed | 13 carries, 41 yards, TD |
| California | Receiving | Mark Hamper | 6 receptions, 66 yards |
| Virginia | Passing | Beau Pribula | 16/24, 146 yards, TD |
| Virginia | Rushing | Beau Pribula | 7 carries, 67 yards |
| Virginia | Receiving | Da'Shawn Martin | 4 receptions, 59 yards, TD |

=== vs. Stanford (The Big Game) ===
Stanford Cardinal (5–5) at California Golden Bears (3–7) – Game summary

| Quarter | 1 | 2 | 3 | 4 | Total |
|---|---|---|---|---|---|
| Cardinal | 0 | 0 | 0 | 0 | 0 |
| Golden Bears | 0 | 0 | 0 | 0 | 0 |

at California Memorial Stadium • Berkeley, California

- Date: November 21
- Game time: TBD

| Statistics | STAN | CAL |
|---|---|---|
| First downs | | |
| Plays–yards | | |
| Rushes–yards | | |
| Passing yards | | |
| Passing: comp–att–int | | |
| Time of possession | | |

| Team | Category | Player | Statistics |
|---|---|---|---|
| Stanford | Passing | | |
| Stanford | Rushing | | |
| Stanford | Receiving | | |
| California | Passing | | |
| California | Rushing | | |
| California | Receiving | | |

=== vs. Pittsburgh ===
Pittsburgh Panthers (6–5) at California Golden Bears (3–8) – Game summary

| Quarter | 1 | 2 | 3 | 4 | Total |
|---|---|---|---|---|---|
| Panthers | 0 | 0 | 0 | 0 | 0 |
| Golden Bears | 0 | 0 | 0 | 0 | 0 |

at California Memorial Stadium • Berkeley, California

- Date: November 28
- Game time: TBD

| Statistics | PITT | CAL |
|---|---|---|
| First downs | | |
| Plays–yards | | |
| Rushes–yards | | |
| Passing yards | | |
| Passing: comp–att–int | | |
| Time of possession | | |

| Team | Category | Player | Statistics |
|---|---|---|---|
| Pittsburgh | Passing | | |
| Pittsburgh | Rushing | | |
| Pittsburgh | Receiving | | |
| California | Passing | | |
| California | Rushing | | |
| California | Receiving | | |

== Awards and honors ==
=== Player of the week honors ===
Weekly awards
| Player | Award | Week awarded | Ref. |

=== All-conference teams ===
All-ACC Football Team
| Player | Award | Position | Ref. |

=== Individual awards ===
ACC individual awards
| Player | Award | Ref. |

== Roster ==
2026 California Golden Bears football team roster
Players
Coaches
Offense

| Pos. | # | Name | Class |
|---|---|---|---|
| TE | 0 | Dorian Thomas | Jr |
| RB | 1 | Carter Vargas | So |
| QB | 2 | EJ Caminong | So |
| QB | 3 | Jaron-Keawe Sagapolutele | So |
| WR | 4 | Jordan King | Sr |
| WR | 5 | QuaRon Adams | Sr |
| WR | 6 | Kyion Grayes | Jr |
| WR | 7 | Chase Hendricks | Sr |
| TE | 8 | Rico Walker | Sr |
| WR | 9 | Ian Strong | Sr |
| WR | 10 | Cooper Perry | So |
| QB | 11 | Jackson Brousseau | Jr |
| RB | 13 | Victor Santino | Fr |
| QB | 14 | Dominic Ingrassia | So |
| WR | 15 | Mark Hamper | Jr |
| WR | 16 | Kai Meza | Fr |
| QB | 17 | Alonzo Esparza | Fr |
| QB | 18 | Nainoa Lopes | Fr |
| WR | 19 | Trevor Rogers | So |
| RB | 20 | Ashten Emory | So |
| WR | 21 | Carson Perry-Smith | So |
| TE | 22 | Taimane Purcell | Fr |
| RB | 23 | Jayden Parker | So |
| RB | 24 | Adam Mohammed | Jr |
| RB | 25 | Anthony League | Fr |
| RB | 33 | Dean-Taylor Chapman | Jr |
| TE | 44 | John Tofi Jr. | Fr |
| OL | 51 | Kahlee Tafai | Jr |
| OL | 52 | Elisha Faamatuainu | Fr |
| OL | 54 | Frederick Williams III | Jr |
| OL | 55 | Daniel McMorris | Fr |
| OL | 56 | Tyson Ruffins | Jr |
| OL | 58 | Ashton Rivera | Jr |
| OL | 65 | Justin Hasenhuetl | Fr |
| OL | 66 | Sam Bjerke | So |
| OL | 68 | Jojo Genova | Fr |
| OL | 70 | Mykeal Rabess | Jr |
| OL | 71 | Sioape Vatikani | Sr |
| OL | 72 | Ben Howard | Fr |
| OL | 73 | Kamo'i Huihui-White | Fr |
| OL | 74 | Michael Klisiewicz | Fr |
| OL | 75 | Jacob Arp | So |
| OL | 76 | Bastian Swinney | Sr |
| OL | 77 | Jimothy Lewis Jr. | So |
| OL | 78 | Lamar Robinson | Sr |
| OL | 79 | Esaiah Wong | Fr |
| WR | 82 | Cole Boscia | Sr |
| TE | 85 | Mason Mini | Jr |
| WR | 87 | Meyer Swinney | Fr |
| TE | 90 | Jack Olyphant | So |

Defense

| Pos. | # | Name | Class |
|---|---|---|---|
| OLB | 0 | Solomon Williams | So |
| DB | 1 | Ricky Fletcher | Sr |
| DB | 2 | Kingston Lopa | So |
| ILB | 3 | Kamar Mothudi | So |
| OLB | 4 | Justin Beadles | Sr |
| DB | 5 | Marquis Groves-Killebrew | Sr |
| OLB | 6 | Emmanuel Okoye | So |
| DB | 7 | Daniel Harris | Sr |
| DB | 8 | Jasiah Wagoner | Jr |
| ILB | 9 | AJ Tuitele | Fr |
| OLB | 10 | Jayden Wayne | Sr |
| DB | 11 | Dayday Aupiu | So |
| DB | 13 | Jae'on Young | Fr |
| DB | 14 | Aiden Manutai | So |
| OLB | 15 | Joshua Pierce | Jr |
| DB | 16 | Michael Hurst Jr. | Sr |
| DB | 17 | Jordan Sanford | Sr |
| OLB | 18 | Serigne Tounkara | So |
| OLB | 19 | Odera Okaka | Sr |
| DB | 20 | Cam Sidney | Sr |
| ILB | 21 | Aaron Hampton | Jr |
| DB | 22 | Tristan Dunn | Sr |
| DB | 23 | Isaiah Crosby | Jr |
| DB | 24 | Quimari Shemwell | Jr |
| DB | 25 | Khamani Hudson | Fr |
| DB | 26 | Niles Davis | Fr |
| DB | 28 | Tre' Harrison | Fr |
| DB | 30 | Mayze Bryant | Jr |
| ILB | 32 | Tristan Jernigan | So |
| ILB | 33 | JD McKinley | Fr |
| DB | 34 | Tobey Weydemuller | So |
| OLB | 36 | Jude McLellan | So |
| DB | 38 | Nate Escalada | Jr |
| OLB | 39 | Michael Cooley | Jr |
| DL | 43 | Lucky Schirmer | Fr |
| DL | 44 | Jericho Johnson | So |
| ILB | 45 | Beckham Barney | Fr |
| DL | 51 | Jayden Williams | Jr |
| DL | 55 | BJ Canady | So |
| DL | 56 | Legend Journey | So |
| ILB | 57 | B. J. Jones | Jr |
| DL | 92 | LeBron Williams | Fr |
| DL | 93 | R. J. Stephens | Jr |
| DL | 94 | Stanley Saole-McKenzie | Sr |
| DL | 96 | Derek Wilkins | Sr |
| DL | 97 | Michael-Anthony Okwura | So |
| DL | 98 | Nate Burrell | Sr |
| DL | 99 | Ashun Shepphard | Sr |

Special teams

| Pos. | # | Name | Class |
|---|---|---|---|
| P | 29 | Angus Davies | Sr |
| LS | 31 | Jordan Franke | Jr |
| K | 33 | Towns McGough | So |
| K, P | 37 | Erik Peters | Fr |
| LS | 45 | David Bird | Sr |
| LS | 48 | Ewan Arechaederra | So |
| K | 91 | Chase Meyer | Sr |

Head coach

- Tosh Lupoi

Coordinators/assistant coaches

- Nick Rolovich – Associate head coach/quarterbacks
- Michael Hutchings – Defensive coordinator
- Jordan Somerville – Offensive coordinator
- Zach Tinker – Special teams coordinator
- Ike Hilliard – Wide receivers/co-offensive coordinator
- Steve Haunga – Tight ends/run game coordinator
- Keith Bhonapha – Running backs/recruiting coordinator
- Pat McCann – Offensive pass game coordinator
- Famika Anae – Offensive lineman
- Da'Von Brown – Defensive backs/co-defensive coordinator
- Keith Heyward – Defensive pass game coordinator
- Darrion Daniels – Defensive linemen/pass rush specialist
- Bryan Barraza – Edge
- Bob Gregory – Inside linebackers
- Connor Boyd – Safeties
- Jeff McDaniels – Assistant quarterbacks
- Geoff McArthur – Assistant wide receivers
- Mike Saffell – Assistant tight ends
- Ryan Barry – Assistant to defensive coordinator
- Eddy McGilvra – Assistant defensive line
- Lorenzo Alexander – Assistant edge
- Sione Ta'ufo'ou – Assistant inside linebackers
- Duke DaRe – Assistant defensive backs
- Quintin Somerville – Defensive analyst
- Jason Novak – Director, athletic performance
- Zach Werlinger – Quality control, special teams

Legend

- (C) Team captain
- (S) Suspended
- (I) Ineligible
- Injured
- Redshirt

Roster
Last update: 5/30/26
