= Meridian School District =

Meridian School District may refer to:

- Meridian Public School District, Meridian, Mississippi
- Meridian School District (Idaho)
- Meridian School District (Washington)

== See also ==
- Meridian Public Schools
- Meridian School
