= Michael Ojemudia =

American football player (born 1997)

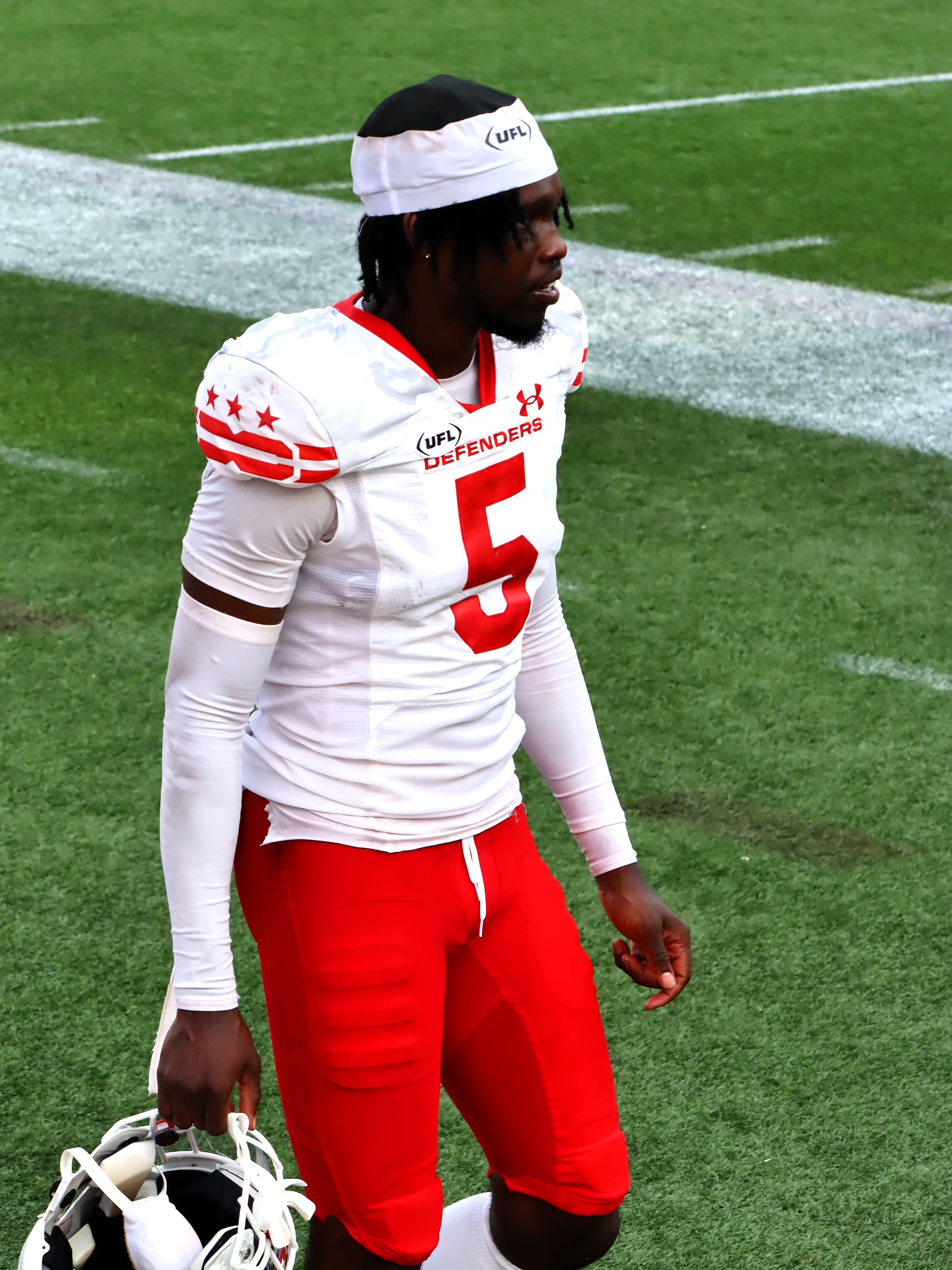
- Ojemudia with the DC Defenders in 2025

No. 23, 13, 26
- Position: Cornerback

Personal information
- Born: September 12, 1997 (age 29); Detroit, Michigan, U.S.
- Listed height: 6 ft 1 in (1.85 m)
- Listed weight: 190 lb (86 kg)

Career information
- High school: Harrison (Farmington Hills, Michigan)
- College: Iowa (2015–2019)
- NFL draft: 2020: 3rd round, 77th overall pick

Career history
- Denver Broncos (2020–2022); Chicago Bears (2022); Los Angeles Rams (2023)*; Arizona Cardinals (2024)*; DC Defenders (2025); Dallas Cowboys (2025)*; St. Louis Battlehawks (2026)
- * Offseason or practice squad member only

Awards and highlights
- UFL champion (2025); Second-team All-Big Ten (2019)

Career NFL statistics as of 2023
- Total tackles: 73
- Forced fumbles: 4
- Pass deflections: 8
- Stats at Pro Football Reference

Michael Ojemudia (born September 12, 1997) is an American former professional football cornerback. He played college football at Iowa. Ojemudia was selected by the Denver Broncos in the third round of the 2020 NFL draft.

== College career ==
Playing high school football at Harrison High School in Farmington Hills, Michigan, Ojemudia committed to Iowa as a linebacker on January 28, 2015, choosing the Hawkeyes over Indiana, Wyoming and Eastern Michigan, who all offered scholarships. Ojemudia was trying to chase in-state scholarship offers from Michigan and Michigan State, but they never came.

After redshirting his freshman year at Iowa, the coaching staff moved Ojemudia from safety to cornerback. Ojemudia played in every game as a redshirt freshman. He broke into the starting lineup occasionally during his sophomore season, and improved his play after a midseason benching. and junior season. He moved into a permanent starting role during his senior season. After his senior season, Ojemudia participated in the 2020 Senior Bowl and 2020 NFL Combine.

== Professional career ==
=== Pre-draft ===
Ojemudia declared for the 2020 NFL draft after his senior season at Iowa. He received an invitation to participate in the Senior Bowl and the NFL Combine. Initially, Ojemudia was not high on many experts' draft boards, but he stood out in the Senior Bowl and increased his draft stock. On March 1, 2020, Ojemudia participated in the NFL Combine. At the end of the pre-draft process, most draft experts ultimately projected Ojemudia as a second-round to fifth-round prospect.

Pre-draft measurables
| Height | Weight | Arm length | Hand span | Wingspan | 40-yard dash | 10-yard split | 20-yard split | 20-yard shuttle | Three-cone drill | Vertical jump | Broad jump |
|---|---|---|---|---|---|---|---|---|---|---|---|
| 6 ft 0 5/8 in (1.84 m) | 200 lb (91 kg) | 32 1/4 in (0.82 m) | 8 7/8 in (0.23 m) | 6 ft 5 3/4 in (1.97 m) | 4.45 s | 1.56 s | 2.62 s | 4.21 s | 6.87 s | 36.0 in (0.91 m) | 10 ft 2 in (3.10 m) |
All values from NFL Combine

=== Denver Broncos ===
==== 2020 season ====
Ojemudia was selected in the third round (77th overall) by the Denver Broncos in the 2020 NFL draft. Heading into his first training camp in the NFL, Ojemudia was a starting cornerback alongside veterans A. J. Bouye and Bryce Callahan. He faced minor competition for his job from third-year veteran Isaac Yiadom. At the conclusion of the Broncos' training camp, head coach Vic Fangio officially named Ojemudia the starting right cornerback in the Broncos' nickel defense.

Ojemudia made his first career start and NFL debut in the Broncos' season-opening loss to the Tennessee Titans. He intercepted a pass in Week 1 that was negated by an unnecessary roughness penalty. In Week 6 of the 2020 season against the New England Patriots, Ojemudia recorded his first career forced fumble on tight end Ryan Izzo which was recovered by the Broncos during the 18–12 win. In Week 15 against the Buffalo Bills, Ojemudia was ejected after punching Bills' wide receiver Gabe Davis. In Week 17 against the Las Vegas Raiders, Ojemudia forced two fumbles that were both recovered by the Broncos defense during the 32–31 loss.

Ojemudia finished his rookie season appearing in all 16 games (11 starts) recording 62 combined tackles, six passes defended, and four forced fumbles while playing in 78% of the defensive snaps.

==== 2021 season ====
Entering his second training camp in the NFL, Ojemudia was slated to be the fourth cornerback on the depth chart, behind free-agent additions Kyle Fuller and Ronald Darby and incumbent veteran Bryce Callahan. During preseason, however, he was surpassed on the depth chart by first-round rookie Patrick Surtain II. At the conclusion of the preseason, head coach Vic Fangio named Ojemudia the fifth cornerback on the depth chart, behind Kyle Fuller, Ronald Darby, Bryce Callahan, and Patrick Surtain II.

On September 1, 2021, Ojemudia was placed on injured reserve to start the season. He was activated on December 11.

On January 2 in the Broncos' Week 17 loss to the Los Angeles Chargers, Ojemudia appeared in 15% of the team's defensive snaps as he worked his way back from injury. The following week in the Broncos' season finale against the Kansas City Chiefs, Ojemudia made his first and only start of the season alongside Kyle Fuller and Bryce Callahan. He had a stellar performance that week, recording eight solo tackles, two passes defensed, and almost notching two interceptions against Patrick Mahomes. Overall, Ojemudia finished his sophomore season appearing in 2 games (1 start) and recording eight tackles and two passes defensed while appearing in 59% of the team's defensive snaps over the two games he played in.

==== 2022 season ====
Heading into the 2022 offseason and training camp, Ojemudia competed for a starting cornerback job against Ronald Darby. At the conclusion of the preseason, head coach Nathaniel Hackett named Ojemudia the fourth cornerback on the depth chart to begin the season, behind Patrick Surtain II, Ronald Darby, and K'Waun Williams. On August 31, Ojemudia was placed on injured reserve to begin the season. He was activated on October 17. He was waived on December 27, 2022.

=== Chicago Bears ===
On December 28, 2022, Ojemudia was claimed off waivers by the Chicago Bears. He was waived on August 29, 2023.

=== Los Angeles Rams ===
On September 21, 2023, Ojemudia signed with the practice squad of the Los Angeles Rams. He was not signed to a reserve/future contract after the season and thus became a free agent when his practice squad contract expired.

=== Arizona Cardinals ===
On January 30, 2024, Ojemudia signed a reserve/future contract with the Arizona Cardinals. He was waived on August 26.

=== DC Defenders ===
On January 23, 2025, Ojemudia signed with the DC Defenders of the United Football League (UFL).

=== Dallas Cowboys ===
Ojemudia signed with the Dallas Cowboys on August 18, 2025. He was released on August 26 as part of final roster cuts.

=== St. Louis Battlehawks ===
On January 12, 2026, Ojemudia was signed by the St. Louis Battlehawks of the United Football League (UFL).

On November 12th, 2026, the UFL announced that Ojemudia had retired from professional football.

== Career statistics ==
=== Regular season ===
| Year | Team | Games | | Tackles | | | | | Interceptions | | | | | | Fumbles | |
| Year | Team | GP | GS | Comb | Solo | Ast | Sck | Sfty | PD | Int | Yds | Avg | Lng | TD | FF | FR |
|---|---|---|---|---|---|---|---|---|---|---|---|---|---|---|---|---|
| 2020 | DEN | 16 | 11 | 62 | 55 | 7 | 0.0 | — | 6 | 0 | 0 | 0.0 | 0 | 0 | 4 | 0 |
| 2021 | DEN | 2 | 1 | 11 | 8 | 3 | 0.0 | — | 2 | 0 | 0 | 0.0 | 0 | 0 | 0 | 0 |
| Career | | 18 | 12 | 73 | 63 | 10 | 0.0 | 0 | 8 | 0 | 0 | 0.0 | 0 | 0 | 4 | 0 |

== Personal life ==
Ojemudia's father, Dennis, was born in Nigeria but later moved to the United States and works as an engineer for Ford Motor Company. Michael, a mechanical engineering major at Iowa, also plans to work in the auto industry once his football career is over. Michael's older brother, Mario, played college football at Michigan and currently works as a corporate partnerships associate for the Denver Broncos.

Ojemudia was an all-state track athlete in the 110-meter hurdles in high school.
