= Jordan Somerville =

American football coach

Current position
- Title: Offensive coordinator
- Team: California
- Conference: ACC

Biographical details
- Born: January 28, 1996 (age 30); Tempe, Arizona, U.S.
- Education: Arizona State University (B.A., 2019)

Coaching career (HC unless noted)
- 2016: American Leadership Academy (RGC/OL)
- 2017–2019: Arizona State (GA)
- 2020–2021: New Mexico (RB/RC)
- 2022: Oregon (OA)
- 2023–2024: Tampa Bay Buccaneers (Asst. QB)
- 2025: Tampa Bay Buccaneers (Asst. QB/Off. PG Spec.)
- 2026–present: California (OC)

Jordan Somerville (born January 28, 1996) is an American football coach who is the offensive coordinator for the California Golden Bears.

== Early life and education ==
Somerville is a native of Tempe, Arizona. He attended Arizona State University, where he graduated in 2019 with a degree in business.

== Coaching career ==
=== American Leadership Academy and Arizona State ===
Somerville began his coaching career in 2016 at American Leadership Academy Queen Creek in Arizona as run game coordinator and offensive line coach. He then served as a student assistant (2017–2018) and graduate assistant (2019) at Arizona State.

=== New Mexico Lobos ===
In January 2020, Somerville was hired as the running backs coach and recruiting coordinator at the University of New Mexico.

=== Oregon ===
Somerville joined the University of Oregon staff in 2022 as an offensive analyst.

While at Oregon, Somerville worked with the Ducks' offensive staff and was credited with contributing to quarterback development and offensive production during the 2022 season. His time at Oregon also overlapped with Tosh Lupoi, who served as the Ducks' defensive coordinator in 2022.

=== Tampa Bay Buccaneers ===
Somerville entered the National Football League in 2023 as assistant quarterbacks coach for the Tampa Bay Buccaneers.

He worked under head coach Todd Bowles and was part of the Buccaneers offensive staff during quarterback Baker Mayfield's first seasons with the franchise.

Bowles publicly endorsed Somerville following his hiring at California, describing him as "extremely smart" and praising his work within the Buccaneers' staff.

Somerville remained with the Buccaneers through the conclusion of the 2025 season before transitioning to the college ranks.

=== California Golden Bears ===
On December 19, 2025, head coach Tosh Lupoi announced Somerville would become the offensive coordinator for the California Golden Bears football program beginning with the 2026 season.

== Coaching accolades ==
- 2× NFC South champion (2023, 2024) — part of Tampa Bay Buccaneers coaching staff.
