= Promise Amukamara =

Nigerian basketball player (born 1993)

No. 10 – Charnay BB
- Position: Point guard
- League: LFB

Personal information
- Born: 22 June 1993 (age 33) New Jersey, U.S.
- Listed height: 1.75 m (5 ft 9 in)

Career information
- High school: Apollo (Glendale, Arizona)
- College: Arizona State (2011–2015)
- WNBA draft: 2015: 3rd round, 36th overall pick
- Drafted by: Phoenix Mercury

Career highlights
- All Pac-12 (2015); 2× Pac-12 All-Defensive Team (2014, 2015)
- Stats at Basketball Reference

Promise Amukamara (born 22 June 1993) is a basketball player who plays as a point guard for Ligue Féminine de Basketball club Charnay BB. Born in the United States, she represents Nigeria at international level.

== Early life and education ==
Promise's height is 5 feet, 9 inches (175 cm). She is a graduate of Arizona State University. She is also the younger sister of Super Bowl XLVI Champion, former New York Giants cornerback Prince Amukamara.

== Career ==
Promise is a member of Nigeria’s female basketball team. She was the point-guard of the team that played at the 2020 Olympic Games in Tokyo. She also participated at the 2018 FIBA Women's Basketball World Cup. In 2024, she was a member of the Nigeria squad that made the Olympic quarterfinals before falling to the United States.

== Achievements ==
- 10 points per game at Tokyo, 2020
- The first Arizona State University graduate women’s basketball player to make an Olympic team
- Member of the 2019 FIBA African Championship Gold Medal team that participated in the Pre-Olympic Qualifying Tournament
- Arizona’s Gatorade Girls Basketball Player of the Year in 2011
- The fastest 100 meters and 200 meters by a freshman in the high school

== Career statistics ==
Legend
GP	Games played	GS	Games started	MPG	Minutes per game	RPG	Rebounds per game
APG	Assists per game	SPG	Steals per game	BPG	Blocks per game	PPG	Points per game
TO	Turnovers per game	FG%	Field-goal percentage	3P%	3-point field-goal percentage	FT%	Free-throw percentage
**Bold**	Career best	°	League leader

=== College ===
Year	Team	GP	GS	MPG	FG%	3P%	FT%	RPG	APG	SPG	BPG	TO	PPG
2011–12	Arizona State	32	0	14.5	43.9	18.2	79.6	1.6	0.4	1.1	**0.3**	**0.7**	4.2
2012–13	Arizona State	31	31	27.8	38.5	20.0	**82.8**	**4.1**	1.7	**1.9**	0.1	1.6	8.0
2013–14	Arizona State	33	31	24.0	44.1	20.8	62.0	2.3	1.6	1.6	0.1	1.3	6.9
2014–15	Arizona State	**35**	**35**	**30.3**	**47.2**	**31.6**	75.0	3.6	**2.0**	1.8	0.1	1.5	**10.9**
**Career**		131	97	24.2	43.7	23.4	74.3	2.9	1.5	1.6	0.1	1.3	7.6
Statistics retrieved from Sports-Reference.
