= Prince Amukamara =

American football player (born 1989)

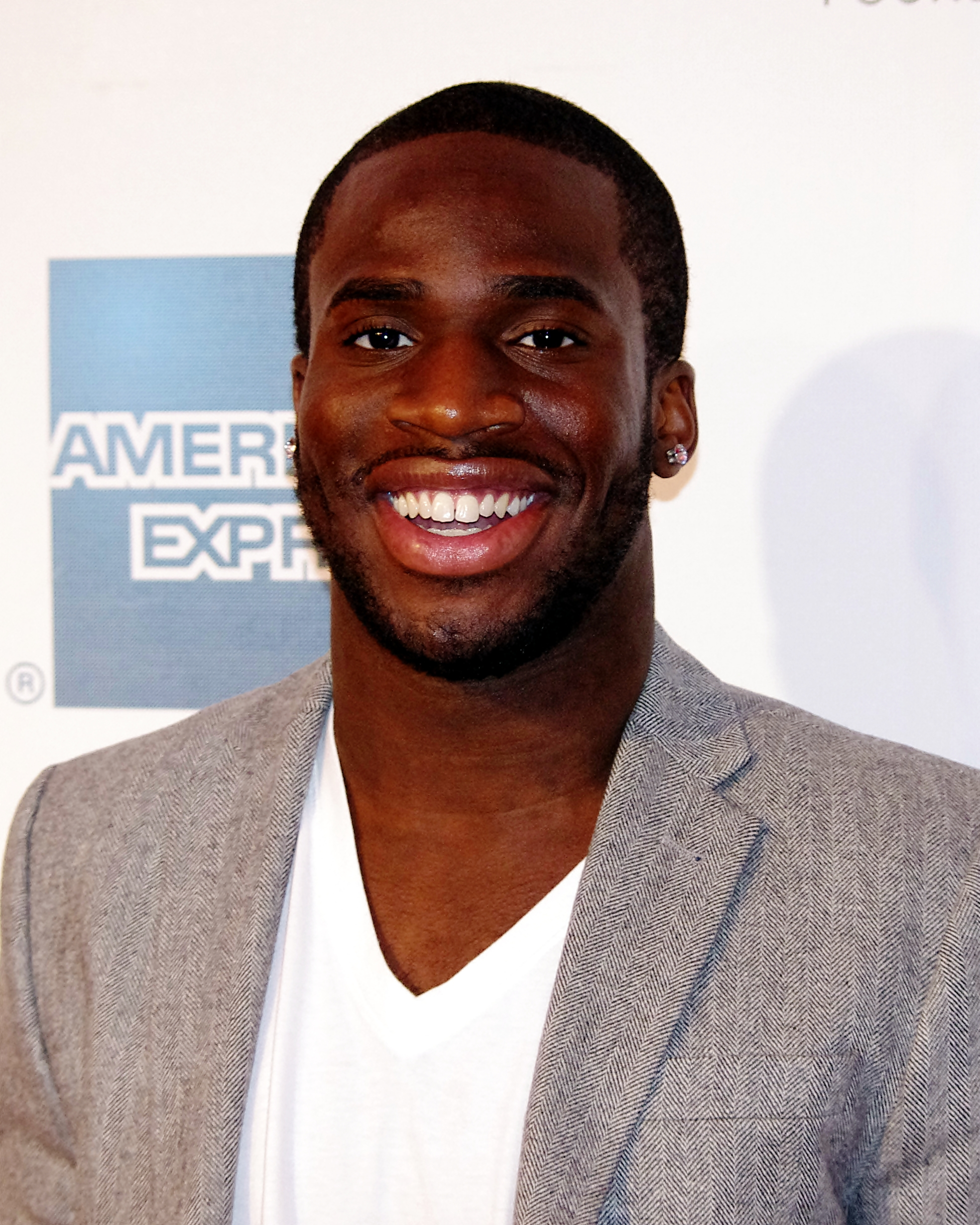
- Amukamara at the 2012 Tribeca Film Festival

No. 20, 21
- Position: Cornerback

Personal information
- Born: June 6, 1989 (age 37); Leominster, Massachusetts, U.S.
- Listed height: 6 ft 0 in (1.83 m)
- Listed weight: 206 lb (93 kg)

Career information
- High school: Apollo (Glendale, Arizona)
- College: Nebraska (2007–2010)
- NFL draft: 2011: 1st round, 19th overall pick

Career history
- New York Giants (2011–2015); Jacksonville Jaguars (2016); Chicago Bears (2017–2019); Las Vegas Raiders (2020)*; Arizona Cardinals (2020)*; New Orleans Saints (2021)*
- * Offseason or practice squad member only

Awards and highlights
- Super Bowl champion (XLVI); Unanimous All-American (2010); Big 12 Defensive Player of the Year (2010); 2× First-team All-Big 12 (2009, 2010)

Career NFL statistics
- Total tackles: 477
- Forced fumbles: 6
- Fumble recoveries: 2
- Pass deflections: 80
- Interceptions: 10
- Defensive touchdowns: 1
- Stats at Pro Football Reference

Prince Kelechi Amukamara (born June 6, 1989) is an American former professional football player who was a cornerback for nine seasons in the National Football League (NFL). He played college football for the Nebraska Cornhuskers, and earned unanimous All-American honors. He was selected by the New York Giants in the first round of the 2011 NFL draft, and was a member of the Giants' Super Bowl XLVI championship team as a rookie against his hometown team, the New England Patriots. Amukamara was also a member of the Jacksonville Jaguars, Chicago Bears, Las Vegas Raiders, Arizona Cardinals and New Orleans Saints.

== Early life ==
Amukamara was born in Leominster, Massachusetts, to parents Romanus and Christy Amukamara, both natives of Nigeria. He soon moved to New Jersey before moving to Glendale, Arizona, when he was five years old. He has five sisters, named Princess, Promise, Peace, Precious, and Passionate. Prince is of Igbo Nigerian descent. His mother was an elite sprinter in Nigeria who was selected for the 1984 Nigerian Olympic team, but did not actually race there. His father is a teacher.

Amukamara attended Apollo High School in Glendale, Arizona, where he excelled in multiple sports. Most notably, Amukamara was a track & field standout in several events, and was one of the Hawks' most explosive weapons on the football field. Through six games in the 2006 season, he had rushed for 1,129 yards and 270 receiving yards on offense and recorded two interceptions on defense. He also had scored 18 offensive touchdowns and three defensive touchdowns. He finished the season with 2,106 rushing yards and 24 touchdowns as a running back and 95 tackles and two interceptions as a defensive back. The Arizona Republic named him the "Big School Player of the Year" in Arizona. Amukamara was also named to the Arizona All-State team by Scout.com.

Regarded as a three-star recruit by Rivals.com, Amukamara was listed as the 11th best prospect from Arizona. On December 29, 2006, Amukamara committed to play college football at Nebraska. He also received scholarship offers from Colorado, Fresno State, Nevada, Oregon State, UNLV, and UTEP. During his senior year of high school, when asked what he thought about the recruiting process, he responded, "I'm not worried about the recruiting now. I will look at it closer after the season."

College recruiting
Name	Hometown	School	Height	Weight	40^{‡}	Commit date
Prince Amukamara; ATH	Glendale, Arizona	Apollo (AZ)	6 ft 1 in (1.85 m)	180 lb (82 kg)	4.5	Dec 29, 2006
Prince Amukamara; ATH	Recruit ratings: Scout: Rivals:					
Overall recruit ranking:
Note: In many cases, Scout, Rivals, 247Sports, On3, and ESPN may conflict in their listings of height and weight.; In these cases, the average was taken. ESPN grades are on a 100-point scale.; Sources: "2007 Team Ranking". Rivals.com.

== College career ==
Amukamara attended the University of Nebraska–Lincoln, and played for the Cornhuskers from 2007 to 2010. After arriving at Nebraska, Amukamara contemplated playing basketball on top of football, but dropped those plans after fall football practices began. As a freshman in 2007, Amukamara was described as being a newcomer "with a lot of personality" by senior linebacker Corey McKeon. He made his debut for Nebraska on September 22 against Ball State, playing on special teams. Amukamara finished the year with four tackles in eight games, splitting time in the secondary and on special teams.

Entering his sophomore season, there was speculation as to whether he would play at running back or cornerback, before being named the back-up cornerback after training camp. He ended up starting the games against Western Michigan, New Mexico State, and Virginia Tech, as he played in all 13 of Nebraska's games. He finished the year with 34 tackles, with his season-high of eight coming against Western Michigan.

As a junior, Amukamara became a starter at cornerback for Nebraska. Against Louisiana-Lafayette, Amukamara suffered an injury during the game, but did not miss any games. Amukamara finished the 2009 season with five interceptions, tied for the most on the team, 11 pass-breakups, 64 tackles, and two sacks. He was named to the first-team All-Big 12 after the season.

Amukamara tallied 59 tackles and one sack, but no interceptions as a senior. However, he only allowed 18 completed passes in his direction on 52 attempts during the season, and was praised for his "lock-down ability" against wide receivers during the season. Following the season, he was recognized as a unanimous All-American, and the Big 12 Defensive Player of the Year. Amukamara was also a Jim Thorpe Award finalist, a Chuck Bednarik Award semifinalist, and a Ronnie Lott Trophy quarterfinalist.

While at the University of Nebraska–Lincoln, Amukamara majored in political science and received his degree in sociology in December 2010.

== Professional career ==
=== Pre-draft ===
Prior to his senior season at Nebraska, a National Football League (NFL) scouting service gave Amukamara a 7.3 rating, which was tied for the highest among 1,400 college seniors that were graded. Sports Illustrated described him as being "physical, possessing solid football speed and top ball skills." They later gave a him a first round grade after other NFL scouts had named him one of the best two seniors in all of college football. He was projected to be a first round draft pick by the majority of NFL draft experts and scouts. Amukamara received an invitation to the NFL combine and completed all of the required positional and combine drills. On March 10, 2011, he participated at Nebraska's pro day along with teammates Niles Paul, Roy Helu, Alex Henery, Eric Hagg, Dejon Gomes, and 12 others. He opted to only perform positional drills for team representatives and scouts who attended. Amukamara was ranked as the second best cornerback prospect in the draft by NFLdraftscout.com, NFL analyst Mike Mayock, and NFL analyst Brian Billick.

Pre-draft measurables
Height	Weight	Arm length	Hand span	Wingspan	40-yard dash	10-yard split	20-yard split	20-yard shuttle	Three-cone drill	Vertical jump	Broad jump	Bench press
6 ft 0 in (1.83 m)	206 lb (93 kg)	30 1/2 in (0.77 m)	8 1/2 in (0.22 m)	5 ft 11 1/2 in (1.82 m)	4.48 s	1.65 s	2.64 s	4.08 s	6.97 s	38.0 in (0.97 m)	10 ft 8 in (3.25 m)	15 reps
All value from NFL Combine

=== New York Giants ===
==== 2011 ====
The New York Giants selected Amukamara in the first round (19th overall) of the 2011 NFL draft. He was the second cornerback selected behind Patrick Peterson (5th overall).

On August 4, 2011, the Giants signed him to a four-year, $8.18 million contract with 90% guaranteed. He was the longest hold out of the 2011 draft class. On August 6, 2011, he was sidelined indefinitely after breaking the fifth metatarsal in his left foot during practice.

On November 20, 2011, Amukamara made his professional regular season debut against the Philadelphia Eagles and recorded a season-high five solo tackles, two pass deflections, and intercepted a pass from Vince Young on the first series of a Giants' 10–17 loss. In Week 14, he collected four solo tackles during a 37–34 victory over the Dallas Cowboys. He finished his rookie season with 14 combined tackles (12 solo), three pass deflections, and an interception in seven games and zero starts. The New York Giants finished the 2011 season with a 9–7 record and received a playoff berth.

On January 8, 2012, Amukamara made his postseason debut and recorded two combined tackles in a 24–2 victory over the Atlanta Falcons during the NFC wildcard game. The Giants went on to defeat the Green Bay Packers 37-20 and the San Francisco 49ers 20–17 in overtime winning the NFC Championship. On February 5, 2012, he made one tackle in a 21–17 victory over the New England Patriots in Super Bowl XLVI.

Throughout his rookie season in 2011, he was the New York Giants' third cornerback on their depth chart, behind Aaron Ross and Corey Webster.

==== 2012 ====
He competed with Aaron Ross, Terrell Thomas, Jayron Hosley, and Justin Tryon for the starting cornerback job. He suffered a high ankle sprain during the Giants' preseason game against the Chicago Bears. The injury kept him sidelined for the first two games of the season.

On September 20, 2012, he made his 2012 season debut, recording a tackle and a pass deflection in a 36–7 defeat of the Carolina Panthers. The following week, he earned four solo tackles and a pass deflection during a 17–19 loss to the Philadelphia Eagles. On October 14, 2012, Amukamara collected six solo tackles, a season-high three pass deflections, and intercepted a pass from Alex Smith in a 26–3 win against the San Francisco 49ers. In Week 10, he recorded a season-high ten combined tackles during a 13–31 loss to the Cincinnati Bengals. He missed Week 15 and was limited in Week 16 due to a hamstring injury. He finished the season with 53 combined tackles (45 solo), seven pass deflections, and an interception in 13 games and 11 starts.

==== 2013 ====
In training camp, Amukamara competed with Aaron Ross, Corey Webster, and Jayron Hosley for the starting cornerback position. He was named the starting cornerback with Corey Webster to start the 2013 season.

On September 15, 2013, Amukamara recorded a career-high ten solo tackles and defended a pass during a 23–41 loss to the Denver Broncos. On September 29, 2013, he collected three combined tackles, defended two passes, and intercepted Kansas City Chiefs' quarterback Alex Smith in a 7–31 loss. He finished the season with a career-high 85 combined tackles (76 solo), 14 pass deflections, and an interception in 16 games and 16 starts.

==== 2014 ====
On May 1, 2014, the New York Giants picked up the fifth-year option for 2015 on Amukamara's rookie contract. He earned a salary of $6.89 million for 2015.

He competed with Dominique Rodgers-Cromartie and Walter Thurmond for the starting cornerback job. Head coach Tom Coughlin named him the starting cornerback alongside Rodgers-Cromartie.

On September 14, 2014, he recorded a season-high nine combined tackles and a pass deflection during the Giants' 14–25 loss to the Arizona Cardinals. The following week, he earned six combined tackles, two pass deflections, and intercepted a pass from Ryan Fitzpatrick during a 30–17 victory over the Houston Texans. In Week 4, Amukarmara recorded three combined tackles, two pass deflections, and intercepted Washington Redskins' quarterback Kirk Cousins in a 45–14 victory. He tore his bicep on November 3, 2014, ending his season. He finished with a total of 46 combined (37 solo), 11 deflected passes, and career-high three interceptions.

==== 2015 ====
Amukamara started the Giants' season-opener against the Dallas Cowboys and recorded a season-high eight combined tackles during a 26–27 loss. In Week 3, he made a season-high eight combined tackles, three pass deflections, and intercepted Washington Redskins' quarterback Kirk Cousins during a 32–21 victory. On October 11, 2015, he suffered an injury to his pectoral during a 30–27 victory over the San Francisco 49ers. Amukamara missed Week 6-10 due to the injury. In Week 15, he recorded a season-high seven solo tackles and defended two passes during a 35–38 loss to the Carolina Panthers. He started ten games in 2015 and appeared in 11, finishing with a total of 63 combined tackles (55 solo), ten pass deflections, an interception, and a forced fumble.

=== Jacksonville Jaguars ===
On March 11, 2016, the Jacksonville Jaguars signed Amukamara to a one-year, $5.5 million contract that included $3 million guaranteed and a signing bonus of $1.5 million.

Amukamara competed against Davon House, Jalen Ramsey, Aaron Colvin, Dwayne Gratz, and Josh Johnson throughout training camp for the starting cornerback job. Head coach Gus Bradley named Amukamara the starting nickelback, alongside Davon House and Jalen Ramsey, to begin the season.

He started the Jaguars' season-opener against the Green Bay Packers and recorded two combined with tackles and a pass deflection. He missed Weeks 2 and 3 due to a hamstring injury.

=== Chicago Bears ===
==== 2017 ====
On March 10, 2017, the Chicago Bears signed Amukamara to a fully guaranteed one-year, $7 million contract with a signing bonus of $3.5 million.

Throughout training camp, he competed with Marcus Cooper, Sherrick McManis, Bryce Callahan, and Kyle Fuller for the Bears' starting cornerback position. Head coach John Fox named him the Bears' starting cornerback to begin the 2017 season.

On August 27, 2017, Amukamara suffered an ankle injury on the first play of a 19–7 preseason victory over the Tennessee Titans. He missed the last preseason game and the first two regular season games due to the ankle injury. In Week 3, he made his Chicago Bears debut and collected three combined tackles and defended two passes in a 23–17 overtime victory over the Pittsburgh Steelers. On October 9, 2017, Amukamara made his first start of the season and made four solo tackles in a 17–20 loss to the Minnesota Vikings.

==== 2018 ====
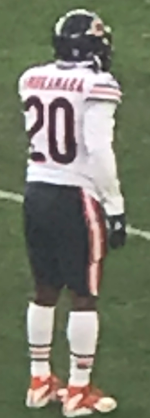
Prince Amukamara in a game against the San Francisco 49ers in 2018

On March 13, 2018, Amukamara signed a three-year, $27 million extension with the Bears. On September 17, 2018, Amukamara recorded his first career interception for a touchdown on quarterback Russell Wilson in the 24–17 victory over the Seattle Seahawks on Monday Night Football.

In week 10 against the Detroit Lions, Amukamara intercepted quarterback Matthew Stafford and also made eight tackles. The Bears won the game 34–22. In week 14 against the Los Angeles Rams, Amukamara intercepted Jared Goff which sealed a 15-6 Bears win. Amukamara finished the season with 66 tackles, 12 passes defended, and 3 interceptions, including a pick six. He received an overall grade of 81.0 from Pro Football Focus in 2018, which ranked as the 9th highest grade among all qualifying corner backs.

==== 2019 ====
In week 4 against the Minnesota Vikings, Amukamara made 2 tackles and forced a fumble off Stefon Diggs in the 16–6 win. In week 5 against the Oakland Raiders, he recovered a fumble forced by Sherrick McManis on Trevor Davis at the goal line in the 24–21 loss. A pulled hamstring against the Detroit Lions in week 13 led to him missing the following week's game.

On February 21, 2020, Amukamara was released by the Bears after three seasons in a move to create cap space.

=== Las Vegas Raiders ===
On May 18, 2020, Amukamara signed with the Las Vegas Raiders. On August 31, he was released by the Raiders after being on their practice squad.

=== Arizona Cardinals ===
On October 13, 2020, Amukamara was signed to the Arizona Cardinals practice squad. His practice squad contract with the team expired after the season on January 11, 2021.

=== New Orleans Saints ===
On August 2, 2021, Amukamara signed with the New Orleans Saints. He was released by New Orleans on August 17.

On August 24, 2023, Amukamara signed a one-day contract with the New York Giants to retire as a member of the team that drafted him.

== Career statistics ==
=== NFL ===
Year	Team	Games		Tackles				Fumbles			Interceptions					
Year	Team	GP	GS	Comb	Total	Ast	Sack	FF	FR	Yds	Int	Yds	Avg	Lng	TD	PD
2011	NYG	7	0	14	12	2	0.0	0	0	0	1	0	0	0	0	3
2012	NYG	13	11	53	45	8	0.0	0	0	0	1	0	0	0	0	6
2013	NYG	16	16	85	76	9	0.0	2	0	0	1	-4	-4	-4	0	13
2014	NYG	8	8	45	37	8	0.0	0	0	0	3	66	22	38	0	11
2015	NYG	11	10	63	55	8	0.0	1	1	0	1	6	6	6	0	10
2016	JAX	14	12	49	46	3	0.0	0	0	0	0	0	0	0	0	6
2017	CHI	14	12	48	45	3	0.0	0	1	0	0	0	0	0	0	7
2018	CHI	15	15	66	57	9	0.0	2	0	0	3	58	19.3	49	1	12
2019	CHI	15	15	53	44	9	0.0	1	1	0	0	0	0	0	0	10
Career		113	99	477	417	60	0.0	6	3	0	10	126	73	49	1	78

=== College ===
Year	School	Conf	G	GS	Tackles					Interceptions			
Year	School	Conf	G	GS	Solo	Ast	Tot	Sacks	Sacks-Yards	Int	PD	FF	FR
2007	Nebraska	B12	8	0	2	2	4	0	0	0	0	0	0
2008	Nebraska	B12	13	3	21	13	34	1	1-11	0	3	2	1
2009	Nebraska	B12	14	14	41	23	64	2	2-11	5	11	1	1
2010	Nebraska	B12	14	14	36	23	59	1	1-9	0	13	0	0

== Personal life ==
Amukamara married Pilar Davis in 2014; Davis was an All American Gymnast who went on to be a tumbler for the Sacramento State Cheerleading Squad. Amukamara is a Christian, refrains from alcohol, and has stated that he stayed chaste before marriage. He has spoken about his faith saying, "... the feeling of winning the Super Bowl went away pretty quickly. I don't think about it much unless people remind me. ... But to be a Christian, that's a daily thing and that's what I think about the most.

Amukamara is an ambassador for Up2Us Sports, a national non-profit organization dedicated to supporting underserved youth by providing them with coaches trained in positive youth development.

Amukamara took part in a Chicago Bears' tradition of the "Home Team Hand-Off" program, where Chicago players can purchase season tickets and donate them to a charity of their choice. He chose to donate to "The Other's Program".
