= Adam Mohammed =

American footballer (born 2006)

- Mohammed in 2026 with Cal

No. 24 – California Golden Bears
- Position: Running back
- Class: Junior

Personal information
- Born: April 26, 2006 (age 20)
- Listed height: 6 ft 0 in (1.83 m)
- Listed weight: 220 lb (100 kg)

Career information
- High school: Apollo (Glendale, Arizona)
- College: Washington (2024–2025); California (2026–present)
- Stats at ESPN

Adam Mohammed (born April 26, 2006) is an American college football running back for the California Golden Bears. He previously played for the Washington Huskies.

== Early life ==
Mohammed attended Apollo High School in Glendale, Arizona. As a sophomore, he ran for 1,564 yards and 24 touchdowns and as a junior, he rushed for 1,341 yards and 30 touchdowns. Mohammed finished his high school career totaling 5,180 yards rushing and 94 touchdowns in 35 games. A three-star recruit, Mohammed committed to play college football at the University of Arizona.

== College career ==
In January 2024, Mohammed entered the transfer portal and transferred to the University of Washington, following head coach Jedd Fisch. As a true freshman, he rushed for 193 yards on 42 carries. Mohammed's production increased as a sophomore, rushing for three touchdowns against Purdue. He had consecutive 100-yard rushing performances against UCLA and Oregon, rushing for 108 yards and 105 yards respectively. Mohammed finished his sophomore campaign rushing for 523 yards and five touchdowns on 106 carries, while also serving as the team's kick returner, making 16 return attempts for 420 yards. Following the conclusion of the season, he announced his decision to enter the transfer portal for a second time.

On January 6, 2026, Mohammed announced his decision to transfer to the University of California, Berkeley to play for the California Golden Bears.

=== Statistics ===
Year	Team	Games		Rushing				Receiving			
Year	Team	GP	GS	Att	Yds	Avg	TD	Rec	Yds	Avg	TD
2024	Washington	13	0	42	193	4.6	0	6	41	6.8	0
2025	Washington	13	2	106	523	4.9	5	17	138	8.1	0
2026	California	4	4	73	336	4.6	3	17	168	9.9	1
Career		30	6	221	1,052	4.8	8	40	347	8.7	1
