= Meridian Public Schools =

Meridian Public Schools may refer to:

- Meridian Public Schools (Michigan)
- Meridian Public Schools (Nebraska)

== See also ==
- Meridian School District
