= Bryce Callahan =

American football player (born 1991)

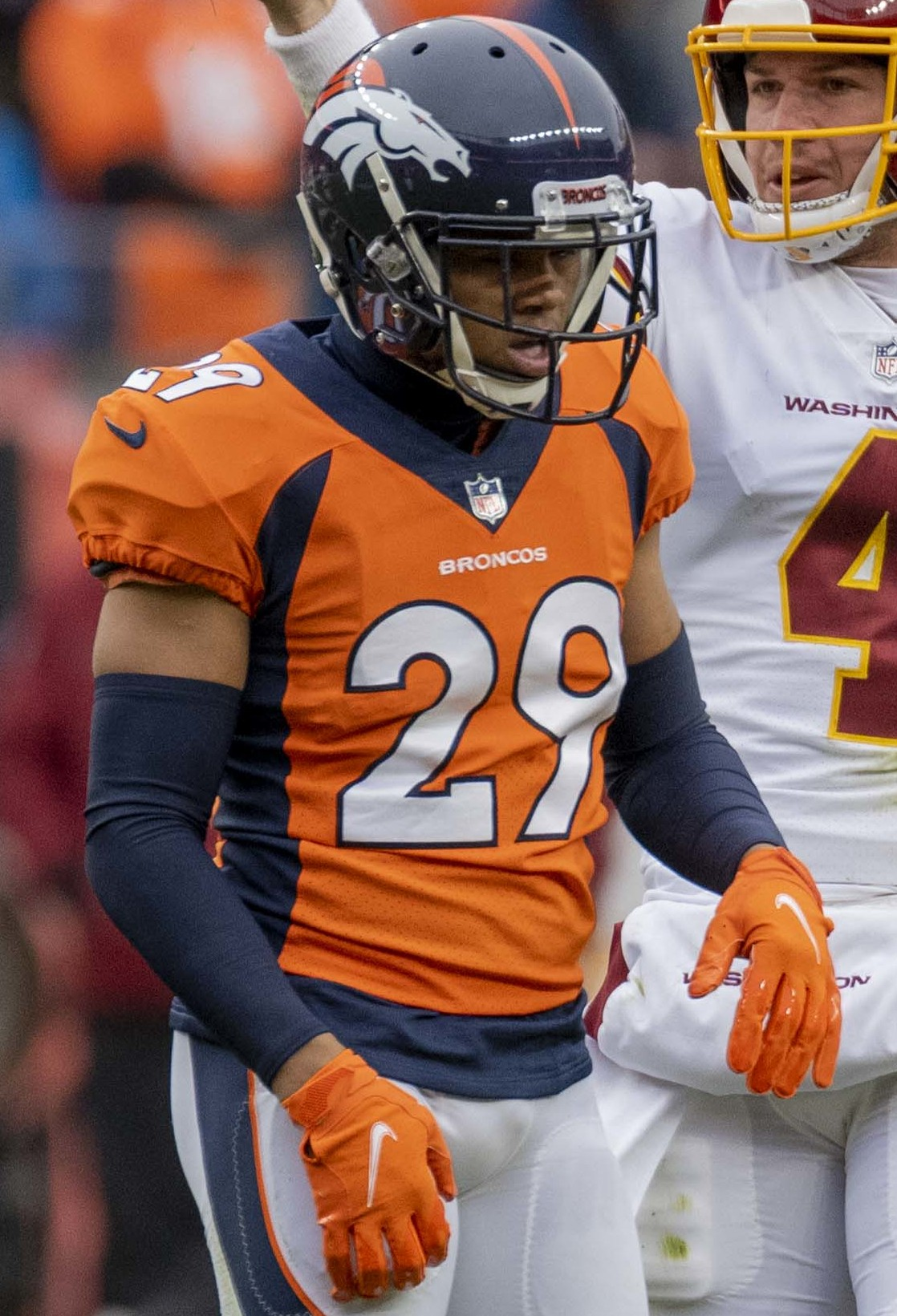
- Callahan with the Denver Broncos in 2021

No. 37, 29, 23
- Position: Cornerback

Personal information
- Born: October 23, 1991 (age 35); Moscow, Idaho, U.S.
- Listed height: 5 ft 9 in (1.75 m)
- Listed weight: 183 lb (83 kg)

Career information
- High school: Cypress Woods (Cypress, Texas)
- College: Rice (2010–2014)
- NFL draft: 2015: undrafted

Career history
- Chicago Bears (2015–2018); Denver Broncos (2019–2021); Los Angeles Chargers (2022)

Awards and highlights
- Second-team All-C-USA (2013)

Career NFL statistics
- Total tackles: 241
- Sacks: 5.0
- Forced fumbles: 1
- Fumble recoveries: 1
- Interceptions: 9
- Pass deflections: 35
- Stats at Pro Football Reference

Bryce Jordan Callahan (born October 23, 1991) is an American former professional football player who was a cornerback in the National Football League (NFL). He played college football for the Rice Owls and signed with the Chicago Bears as an undrafted free agent in 2015.

== Early life ==
Callahan was born in Moscow, Idaho. He attended Cypress Woods High School where he played football. He was named to the 5A All State First-team and Dave Campbell's Texas Football's 2009 All-Texas High School team.

== Professional career ==
Pre-draft measurables
| Height | Weight | Arm length | Hand span | 40-yard dash | 10-yard split | 20-yard split | 20-yard shuttle | Three-cone drill | Vertical jump | Broad jump | Bench press |
|---|---|---|---|---|---|---|---|---|---|---|---|
| 5 ft 9 1/8 in (1.76 m) | 183 lb (83 kg) | 30 5/8 in (0.78 m) | 9 1/4 in (0.23 m) | 4.47 s | 1.50 s | 2.58 s | 4.27 s | 7.00 s | 43.0 in (1.09 m) | 11 ft 0 in (3.35 m) | 15 reps |
All values from Pro Day

=== Chicago Bears ===
==== 2015 ====
On May 2, 2015, Callahan signed with the Chicago Bears as an undrafted free agent following the conclusion of the 2015 NFL draft. He made his NFL debut on September 13 against the Green Bay Packers. On September 22, the Bears waived Callahan. On September 24, the Bears re-signed Callahan for the practice squad. On October 20, he was promoted to the active roster. On November 9, Callahan recorded his first career pass deflection against the San Diego Chargers. On January 3, 2016, Callahan recorded his first career sack against the Detroit Lions. He finished his rookie season with three starts in nine games, notching 21 tackles, four pass breakups, and a sack. He also fielded a punt return for 34 yards.

==== 2016 ====
Callahan returned for his second season and was named the starting slot cornerback to begin the season. On September 19, 2016, in Week 2 against the Philadelphia Eagles on Monday Night Football, Callahan made a diving play to deflect a touchdown pass from quarterback Carson Wentz to tight end Brent Celek. On October 9, he made a career-high six tackles but left early due to a hamstring injury against the Indianapolis Colts. On December 11, Callahan broke up a career high two passes against the Lions. He finished his second season with ten starts in eleven games, recording 32 tackles and five pass breakups. He returned two kicks and one punt, gaining a combined 20 yards.

==== 2017 ====
On March 6, 2017, Callahan re-signed with the Bears and was named the starting slot cornerback to begin the season. On September 24, he grabbed his second career sack and his first career forced fumble, bringing down the Pittsburgh Steelers' Ben Roethlisberger and knocking the football free. On October 15, Callahan grabbed his first career interception, picking off the Baltimore Ravens' Joe Flacco and returning it 52 yards. He grabbed his second interception off DeShone Kizer of the Cleveland Browns on December 24. On December 31, Callahan returned a punt on a trick play 59 yards for a touchdown in the season finale against the Minnesota Vikings. His third season ended with six starts in twelve games, recording 25 tackles, six pass deflections, two interceptions, and a sack.

==== 2018 ====
On March 12, 2018, the Bears placed a tender on Callahan with the right of first refusal. On April 17, he signed a one-year deal worth $1.3 million. Callahan was named the third cornerback and the starting slot cornerback on the Bears’ depth chart, behind Kyle Fuller and Prince Amukamara.

On September 23, Callahan intercepted quarterback Josh Rosen to seal a 16–14 victory against the Arizona Cardinals. On October 28, Callahan made 4 tackles, deflected 3 passes and sacked quarterback Sam Darnold in a 24–10 victory against the New York Jets. In Week 10 against the Detroit Lions, Callahan made 5 tackles, sacked, and intercepted quarterback Matthew Stafford in the 34–22 win. He suffered a broken foot in Week 14 and was placed on injured reserve on December 12, 2018. Callahan finished the season with 45 tackles, 6 passes defended, and 2 interceptions. He received an overall grade of 81.4 from Pro Football Focus in 2018, which ranked as the 7th highest grade among all qualifying cornerbacks and 3rd among all slot cornerbacks.

=== Denver Broncos ===
==== 2019 ====
On March 15, 2019, Callahan signed a three-year, $21 million contract with the Denver Broncos, reuniting him with former Bears defensive coordinator and Broncos head coach Vic Fangio. He began training camp as the Denver Broncos’ starting right cornerback in their base packages opposite starting left cornerback Chris Harris Jr. The Broncos also named Callahan the starting slot cornerback in sub-packages. However, he was still recovering from a foot injury sustained at the end of the previous season. At the end of the 2018 season, Callahan underwent surgery to repair his broken foot. However, his foot never fully healed and suffered complications from the screw placed in his foot. He was placed on injured reserve on November 15, 2019, without playing a snap in 2019.

==== 2020 ====
Callahan entered training camp as a starting cornerback opposite A. J. Bouye and rookie Michael Ojemudia. He finally made his debut with the Broncos as the starting slot cornerback in Week 1 of the 2020 season against the Tennessee Titans on Monday Night Football. During the game, Callahan recorded 8 tackles in the 16–14 loss. In Week 6 against the New England Patriots, Callahan recorded his first interception as a Bronco off a pass thrown by Cam Newton during the 18–12 win. In Week 8 against the Los Angeles Chargers, Callahan intercepted a pass thrown by Justin Herbert during the 31–30 win. He was placed on injured reserve on December 2, 2020.

=== 2021 ===
Entering the 2021 season, Callahan was slated to retain his starting slot cornerback role as the Broncos signed Kyle Fuller and Ronald Darby in free agency and drafted Patrick Surtain II in the first round of the 2021 NFL draft. At the conclusion of the NFL preseason, head coach Vic Fangio officially retained Callahan as the starting slot cornerback.

On November 3, 2021, Callahan was placed on injured reserve after suffering a knee injury in Week 8. He was activated on December 11.

Callahan finished the 2021 NFL season appearing in 11 games (6 starts) and collected 29 tackles (25 solo) along with 4 passes defensed, 1 sack, and no interceptions.

=== Los Angeles Chargers ===
On May 4, 2022, Callahan signed with the Los Angeles Chargers. He played in 15 games with 11 starts, recording a career-high 47 tackles, six passes defensed, and three interceptions.

== NFL career statistics ==
Legend
| **Bold** | Career high |

=== Regular season ===
| Year | Team | Games | | Tackles | | | | | Interceptions | | | | | Fumbles | | | |
| Year | Team | GP | GS | Cmb | Solo | Ast | Sck | TFL | Int | Yds | TD | Lng | PD | FF | FR | Yds | TD |
|---|---|---|---|---|---|---|---|---|---|---|---|---|---|---|---|---|---|
| 2015 | CHI | 9 | 3 | 21 | 20 | 1 | 1.0 | 4 | 0 | 0 | 0 | 0 | 3 | 0 | 0 | 0 | 0 |
| 2016 | CHI | 11 | 10 | 32 | 31 | 1 | 0.0 | 0 | 0 | 0 | 0 | 0 | 5 | 0 | 0 | 0 | 0 |
| 2017 | CHI | 12 | 6 | 25 | 20 | 5 | 1.0 | 1 | 2 | **73** | 0 | **52** | **6** | **1** | 0 | 0 | 0 |
| 2018 | CHI | 13 | 10 | 45 | **39** | 6 | **2.0** | **6** | 2 | 12 | 0 | 12 | **6** | 0 | 0 | 0 | 0 |
| 2020 | DEN | 10 | 10 | 42 | 36 | 6 | 0.0 | 1 | 2 | 0 | 0 | 0 | 5 | 0 | **1** | 0 | 0 |
| 2021 | DEN | 11 | 6 | 29 | 25 | 4 | 1.0 | 3 | 0 | 0 | 0 | 0 | 4 | 0 | 0 | 0 | 0 |
| 2022 | LAC | **15** | **11** | **47** | 34 | **13** | 0.0 | 2 | **3** | 37 | **1** | 26 | **6** | 0 | 0 | 0 | 0 |
| Total | | 81 | 56 | 241 | 205 | 36 | 5.0 | 17 | 9 | 122 | 1 | 52 | 35 | 1 | 1 | 0 | 0 |

=== Playoffs ===
| Year | Team | Games | | Tackles | | | | | Interceptions | | | | | Fumbles | | | |
| Year | Team | GP | GS | Cmb | Solo | Ast | Sck | TFL | Int | Yds | TD | Lng | PD | FF | FR | Yds | TD |
|---|---|---|---|---|---|---|---|---|---|---|---|---|---|---|---|---|---|
| 2022 | LAC | **1** | **1** | **6** | **4** | **2** | 0.0 | 0 | 0 | 0 | 0 | 0 | **1** | 0 | 0 | 0 | 0 |
| Total | | 1 | 1 | 6 | 4 | 2 | 0.0 | 0 | 0 | 0 | 0 | 0 | 1 | 0 | 0 | 0 | 0 |
