= Apollo High School (Arizona) =

Location
- 8045 North 47th Avenue; Glendale, Arizona 85302; United States; 33°33′17″N 112°09′34″W

Information
- Type: Public
- Motto: "Choose Excellence" or "Pick it up, Apollo!"
- Established: 1970; 56 years ago
- School district: Glendale Union High School District
- Principal: Benjamin White
- Teaching staff: 91.60 (FTE)
- Grades: 9-12
- Enrollment: 2,228 (2023-2024)
- Student to teacher ratio: 24.32
- Campus type: Suburban
- Colors: Navy, gold, and white
- Nickname: Hawks
- Newspaper: Hawk Talk
- Yearbook: Olympus
- Communities served: Glendale; Phoenix
- Feeder schools: Glenn F. Burton School; Horizon School; Isaac E. Imes School; Palo Verde Middle School
- Website: Apollo High School

Apollo High School is a public high school located in Glendale, Arizona, serving approximately 2,230 students in grades 9-12. It is part of the Glendale Union High School District, which is ranked 165 out of 289 districts in the state. The Apollo High School motto is the current "Choose Excellence".

The nickname is The Hawks, and the school colors are navy blue, gold, and white.

== History ==
Apollo opened in 1970 designed by local architects Varney, Sexton Sydnor Associates. The design used was similar to Moon Valley High School which opened 5 years earlier. The construction contract to build the school was awarded to TGK Construction Company.

The campus was dedicated on November 13, 1970, by Apollo 13 Astronaut Jack Swigert.

== Athletics ==
Apollo High School is a member of the Arizona Interscholastic Association. AHS offers sports for both boys and girls during the fall, winter, and spring seasons.

	Fall athletics	Winter athletics	Spring athletics
Girls	Badminton, Volleyball (Varsity, JV, Freshman)	Basketball (Varsity, JV, Freshman), Soccer (Varsity, JV, JV2, Freshman), Wrestling	Softball (Varsity, JV, Freshman), Tennis (Varsity, JV)
Boys	Football (Varsity, JV, Freshman) Golf	Basketball (Varsity, JV, Freshman), Soccer (Varsity, JV, JV2, Freshman), Wrestling (Varsity, JV, Freshman)	Baseball (Varsity, JV, Freshman), Tennis (Varsity, JV), Volleyball (JV, Freshman)
Mixed	Cross Country, Swim & Dive		Track & Field

- Apollo High School boys' basketball team won the Arizona State 4A Championship three years in a row (2005, 2006, 2007).
- Apollo High School girls' basketball team was the runner-up of the Arizona State Championship in their division in 2010.
- Apollo High School boys' soccer team won the Arizona State 5A Championship in 1993.

== Awards and recognition ==
Apollo High School has been granted "Excelling" status by Arizona in accordance with the No Child Left Behind Act and high AIMS scores over the past years.

Apollo High School is ranked 53rd top high school within Arizona.

== Demographics ==
Apollo High School has changed demographically over the last couple decades compared to 1999 when it's demographics was: 64% White, 27% Hispanic, 3% Black, 2% Asian and 4% other

Today Apollo High School is largely Hispanic (72%), 11% White, 7% Black, 4% Asian, and less than 5% of other races.

== Academic standards and assessment ==
Apollo High School offers a college-preparatory curriculum that includes Advanced Placement (AP) coursework and state-required academic programs. This school is assessed through Arizona's statewide testing system, including the ACT and AzSCI assessments.

Apollo High School has a College Readiness Index Score of 20.3/100 based on AP participation and performance. Approximately 29% of seniors take AP exams, with 17% of the graduating class earning a score of 3 or higher on at least one AP exam. Among AP exam participants, the reported pass rate is 39%.

On state assessments, including the ACT, SAT, and AzSCI, Apollo High School has an overall performance score of 46%. Subject proficiency rates reported include approximately 27% in mathematics, 29% in reading, and 30% in science.

Compared to 21% in mathematics, 54% in reading and N/A in science, in 2001.

== Clubs ==
- Academic Decathlon
- Acoustics
- Anime
- Apollo Hospitality
- Architecture Construction Engineering (ACE)
- Art Club
- Band / Orchestra
- Best Buddies
- Chess
- Choir
- Club Glow
- Color Guard
- Dance
- DECA (Marketing)
- Environmental Awareness
- FCCLA Culinary
- FCCLA Early Childhood Education
- Fiber Arts
- French Club
- Future Business Leaders of America (FBLA – Business)
- Future Business Leaders of America (FBLA – IT)
- Gamers Club
- Hawk Town
- Hello: A Social Club
- HOSA/ Sports Medicine
- K-POP
- Key Club
- LGBTQ+Ally Club
- Link Crew
- Math Club
- National Honor Society (NHS)
- Newspaper
- NJROTC
- Robotics Club
- Skills USA - Film & TV
- Skills USA - Fire Science
- Skills USA - Graphic Design
- Spanish Club
- Speech & Debate
- Student Council
- Theater & Thespian Club
- Yearbook

== Apollo Hawks NJROTC ==
The Apollo High School Navy Junior Reserve Officers' Training Corps (NJROTC) unit was established in 1972 by Commander Tray Ray. Over its history, the unit has graduated more than 4,200 cadets and earned multiple designations, including Honor Unit and Unit Achievement. In 1991, under the direction of Lieutenant Commander Terry Tassin, the unit was recognized as the Outstanding NJROTC Unit in the United States.

As of 2026, the program is designated as a Distinguished Unit with Honors. The unit fields several competitive co-curricular teams, including Color Guard, Drill Team, Arms Team, Air Rifle, Orienteering, and Academics.

Official NJROTC Hawks Website:

- Official Apollo High School NJROTC Website

== Notable alumni ==
- Prince Amukamara, Super Bowl champion (XLVI), cornerback for the Chicago Bears
- Promise Amukamara, basketball player and Olympian
- Jennie Garth, actress
- Bob Horner (class of 1976), professional baseball infielder
- Rick Kranitz, Major League Baseball pitching coach
- Paul Lo Duca (class of 1990), former Major League Baseball catcher
- Adam Mohammed (class of 2024), college football running back for the Washington Huskies
- J. J. Yeley (class of 1994), professional stock car racing driver; NASCAR Sprint & Xfinity Series
