= Zach Tinker (American football) =

American football coach (born c. 1977)

Current position
- Title: Special teams coordinator
- Team: California
- Conference: ACC

Biographical details
- Born: c. 1977 (age 48–49); Seattle, Washington, U.S.
- Education: Western Washington University (1998, 2008)

Playing career
- 1995–1998: Western Washington
- Position: Defensive end

Coaching career (HC unless noted)
- 1999–2002: Meridian HS (WA) (line)
- 2003–2004: Western Washington (TE)
- 2005–2006: Western Washington (OL)
- 2007: Southern Oregon (ST/WR)
- 2008–2011: Eastern Oregon (OC/QB)
- 2012–2015: South Dakota Mines (AHC/OC)
- 2016–2019: South Dakota Mines
- 2020–2021: Central Washington (OC/QB)
- 2022: Oregon (STQC)
- 2023: California (STQC)
- 2024–2025: Oregon (STA)
- 2026–present: California (STC)

Head coaching record
- Overall: 18–26

Zachary Tinker (born c. 1977) is an American college football coach. He is the special teams coordinator for the University of California, Berkeley, a position he has held since 2026. He was the head football coach for South Dakota School of Mines and Technology from 2016 to 2019.

== Playing career and education ==
Tinker played college football for Western Washington as a defensive end.

Tinker received his Bachelor's degree in political science in 1998 and his Master's degree in teaching in 2008, both from Western Washington University.

== Coaching career ==
Tinker began his coaching career in 1999 following his graduation from Western Washington with Meridian High School. He coached with the school until 2002.

In 2003, Tinker was named the tight ends coach for his alma mater under head coach Rob Smith. In 2005, he was promoted to offensive line coach and was retained when Robin Ross was named head coach in 2006.

In 2007, Tinker was hired as the special teams coordinator and wide receivers coach for Southern Oregon under head coach Steve Helminiak.

In 2008, Tinker was hired as the offensive coordinator and quarterbacks coach for Eastern Oregon under first-year head coach Tim Camp.

In 2012, Tinker was hired as the assistant head coach and offensive coordinator for South Dakota Mines under first-year head coach Stacy Collins. In 2016, he was promoted to head football coach. In four seasons as head coach he led the team to an 18–26 record with his best seasons coming from 2016 to 2018 as he finished 5–6 each year. He resigned following the 2019 season.

In 2020, Tinker was hired as the offensive coordinator and quarterbacks coach for Central Washington under head coach Chris Fisk.

In 2022, Tinker took an off-the-field role as a special teams quality control coach for Oregon under head coach Dan Lanning.

In 2023, Tinker took the same position for California under head coach Justin Wilcox.

In 2024, Tinker rejoined Lanning and Oregon, this time as a special teams analyst.

== Personal life ==
Tinker and his wife Marnie have two children together.

== Head coaching record ==
Year	Team	Overall	Conference	Standing	Bowl/playoffs
South Dakota Mines Hardrockers (Rocky Mountain Athletic Conference) (2016–2019)
2016	South Dakota Mines	5–6	4–6	7th	
2017	South Dakota Mines	5–6	4–6	T–7th	
2018	South Dakota Mines	5–6	4–6	T–6th	
2019	South Dakota Mines	3–8	2–8	T–9th	
South Dakota Mines:		18–26	14–26		
Total:		18–26			
