= Tosh Lupoi =

American football player and coach (born 1981)

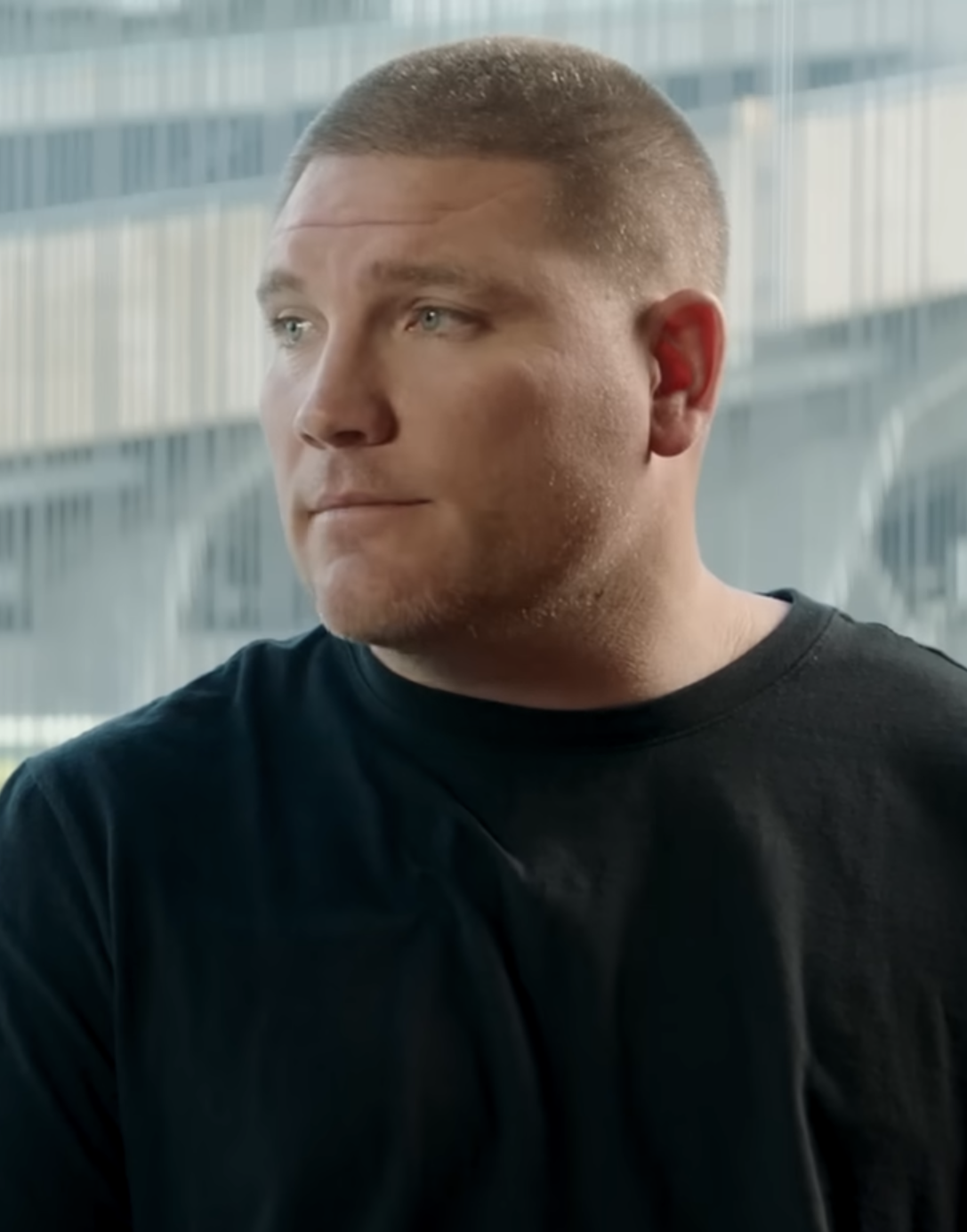
- Lupoi in 2025

Current position
- Title: Head coach
- Team: California
- Conference: ACC
- Record: 3–8

Biographical details
- Born: July 22, 1981 (age 45); Walnut Creek, California, U.S.

Playing career
- 2000–2005: California
- Position: Defensive lineman

Coaching career (HC unless noted)
- 2008–2011: California (DL)
- 2012–2013: Washington (DL)
- 2014–2015: Alabama (DA)
- 2016: Alabama (OLB)
- 2017: Alabama (co-DC/OLB)
- 2018: Alabama (DC/OLB)
- 2019: Cleveland Browns (DL)
- 2020: Atlanta Falcons (DL/RGC)
- 2021: Jacksonville Jaguars (DL)
- 2022–2025: Oregon (DC/LB)
- 2026–present: California

Head coaching record
- Overall: 3–8

Tosh John Lupoi (born July 22, 1981) is an American college football coach who is the head football coach at the University of California, Berkeley.

== Early life and playing career ==
Lupoi grew up in the San Francisco Bay Area and was raised in a Mormon household.

Lupoi played high school football at De La Salle High School in Concord, California, and was a defensive lineman for Cal from 2000 to 2005.

As a player, Lupoi led the Bears' defensive line in tackles in 2003 and earned Pac-10 All-Academic recognition in 2005.

Initially recruited to play under Tom Holmoe, Cal only won a combined four games in Lupoi's first two years there. Lupoi first achieved college football success when Jeff Tedford became Cal's head coach in 2002. Lupoi and Cal won 26 games over the next three years playing under Tedford.

Tedford gave Lupoi his first football-related job after Lupoi completed his eligibility and graduated from Cal.

== Coaching career ==
=== Assistant at California ===
Lupoi served as a graduate assistant for two years at his alma mater, the University of California, Berkeley. In 2008, Lupoi was hired as a defensive line coach at Cal. During his time as a Cal coach, Lupoi developed a reputation as an elite recruiter, being named as National Recruiter of the year by recruiting site Rivals.com in 2010. Lupoi was suspended in 2010 after admitting to telling a player to fake an injury in a game against Oregon.

=== Washington ===
Lupoi was then hired by Steve Sarkisian to be the defensive line coach for University of Washington, serving in the role from 2012 to 2013.

In connection with Lupoi's departure from Cal to Washington, several highly ranked recruits who had previously committed to Cal, including five-star defensive player Shaq Thompson, broke their commitments to Cal and instead followed Lupoi to the Huskies.

During his time at Washington, Lupoi was listed as a participant on extravagant bar tabs that were later released publicly in the wake of Steve Sarkisian's termination from USC. On 8 January 2013 at Ribby's Ribs in Nashville, "Sarkisian and three assistants [including Tosh Lupoi] ordered four shots of Patron Silver, four shots of an unspecified liquor and five beers. The coach cashed out at 11:53 a.m."

Lupoi's time in Washington did not last long. He was not retained by new Washington coach Chris Petersen after Sarkisian left Washington for USC. Sarkisian chose not to hire Lupoi at USC, as Lupoi was under investigation for alleged recruiting violations at Washington, for which he was later acquitted.

=== Alabama ===
Lupoi joined the Crimson Tide staff as a defensive analyst in 2014 and coached the outside linebackers in 2015. He added the title of co-defensive coordinator prior to the 2016 season and served as defensive coordinator in 2018. During his time at Alabama, the Crimson Tide qualified for the College Football Playoffs all five seasons, advanced to the National Championship game four times and captured two national titles (2015 and 2017). During his time as coordinator, Alabama led the nation in scoring defense in 2016 (13.0 ppg) and 2017 (11.9). The school also finished second in the nation in total defense in 2016 (260.4 ypg) and 2017 (261.8 ypg). Lupoi worked with several players who went on to be first-round picks in the NFL, including DE Jonathan Allen, LB Reuben Foster, S Minkah Fitzpatrick, NT Daron Payne and LB Rashaan Evans.

=== NFL ===
On January 18, 2019, Lupoi was hired by the Cleveland Browns as their defensive line coach under head coach Freddie Kitchens.

On January 11, 2020, Lupoi was hired by the Atlanta Falcons as their defensive line coach and run game coordinator under head coach Dan Quinn.

On February 11, 2021, Lupoi was hired by the Jacksonville Jaguars as their defensive line coach under head coach Urban Meyer.

=== Oregon ===
On January 10, 2022, Lupoi was hired by the Oregon Ducks as their defensive coordinator and linebackers coach under head coach Dan Lanning.

Lupoi was allowed to coach Oregon's defense for the 2025 Ducks' College Football Playoff run, which ended with a 56–22 loss to eventual national champion Indiana in the Peach Bowl.

=== Head coach at California ===
On December 4, 2025, Lupoi was named the 35th head coach of the California Golden Bears, marking a return to his alma mater after 14 seasons. Lupoi's buyout of $2 million from Oregon was waived since he was assuming a position as a head coach, and he was encouraged to take the position by Lanning.

== Head coaching record ==
| Year | Team | Overall | Conference | Standing | Bowl/playoffs |
|---|---|---|---|---|---|
California Golden Bears (Atlantic Coast Conference) (2026–present)
| 2026 | California | 3–8 | 2–6 | | |
| California: | | 3–8 | 2–6 | | |
| Total: | | 3–8 | | | |
