= Patrick Surtain II =

American football player (born 2000)

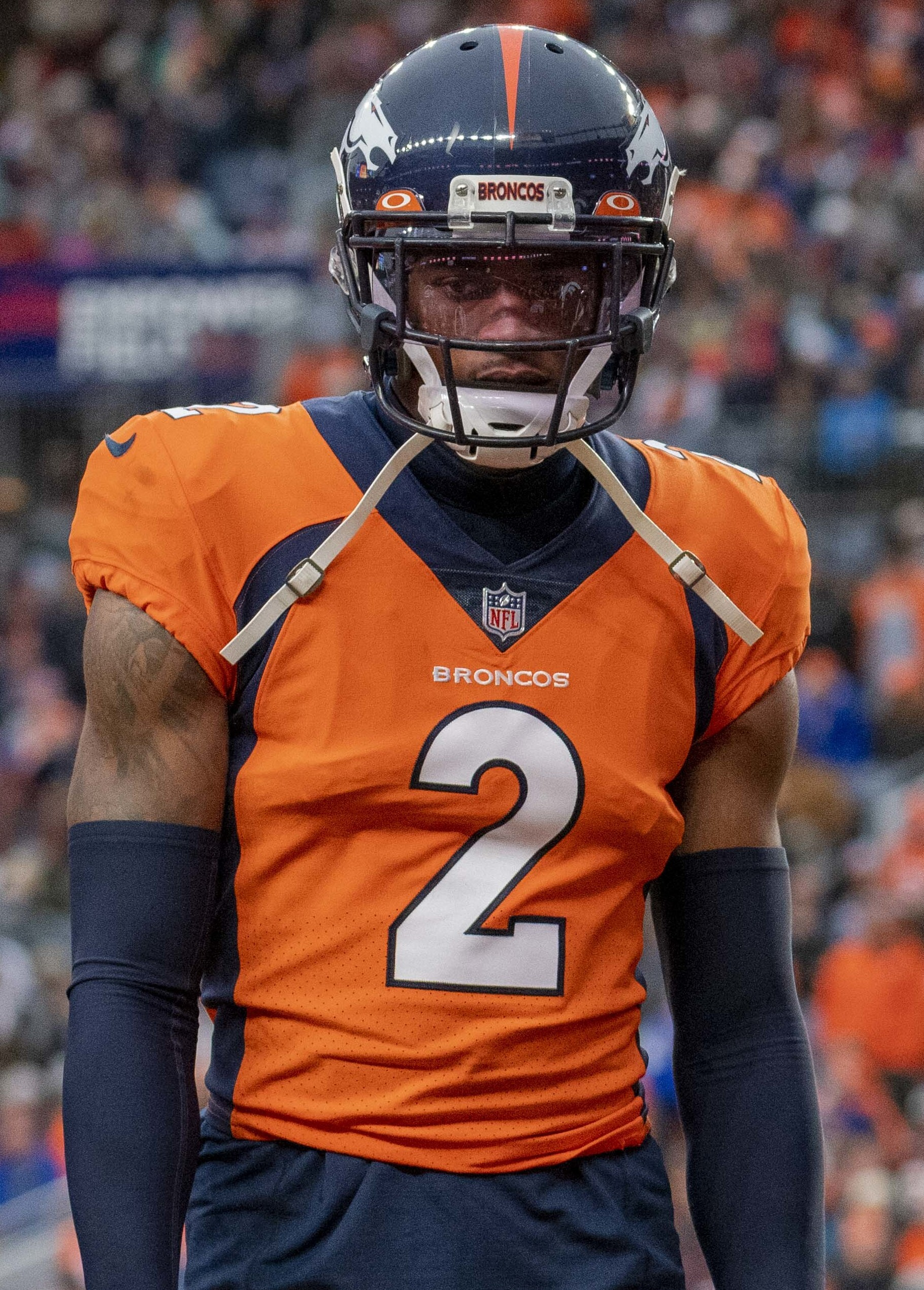
- Surtain with the Denver Broncos in 2021

No. 2 – Denver Broncos
- Position: Cornerback
- Roster status: Active

Personal information
- Born: April 14, 2000 (age 26); Plantation, Florida, U.S.
- Listed height: 6 ft 2 in (1.88 m)
- Listed weight: 202 lb (92 kg)

Career information
- High school: American Heritage (Plantation)
- College: Alabama (2018–2020)
- NFL draft: 2021: 1st round, 9th overall pick

Career history
- Denver Broncos (2021–present)

Awards and highlights
- NFL Defensive Player of the Year (2024); 2× First-team All-Pro (2022, 2024); Second-team All-Pro (2025); 4× Pro Bowl (2022–2025); PFWA All-Rookie Team (2021); CFP national champion (2020); SEC Defensive Player of the Year (2020); Unanimous All-American (2020); First-team All-SEC (2020)

Career NFL statistics as of Week 9, 2026
- Tackles: 312
- Forced fumbles: 2
- Fumble recoveries: 1
- Pass deflections: 61
- Interceptions: 12
- Defensive touchdowns: 2
- Stats at Pro Football Reference

Patrick Frank Surtain II (/sərˈtæn/ sər-TAN; born April 14, 2000) is an American professional football cornerback for the Denver Broncos of the National Football League (NFL). He played college football for the Alabama Crimson Tide, with whom he won the 2020 National Championship, and was selected ninth overall by the Broncos in the 2021 NFL draft. Surtain has made four consecutive Pro Bowls and was named the Defensive Player of the Year in 2024. He is the son of former Pro Bowl cornerback Patrick Surtain.

== Early life ==
Surtain II attended American Heritage School in Plantation, Florida. He was coached by his father, Patrick Surtain, who played in the National Football League (NFL). Surtain II played in the 2018 U.S. Army All-American Bowl. A five-star recruit, he committed to play college football at the University of Alabama in 2018.

== College career ==
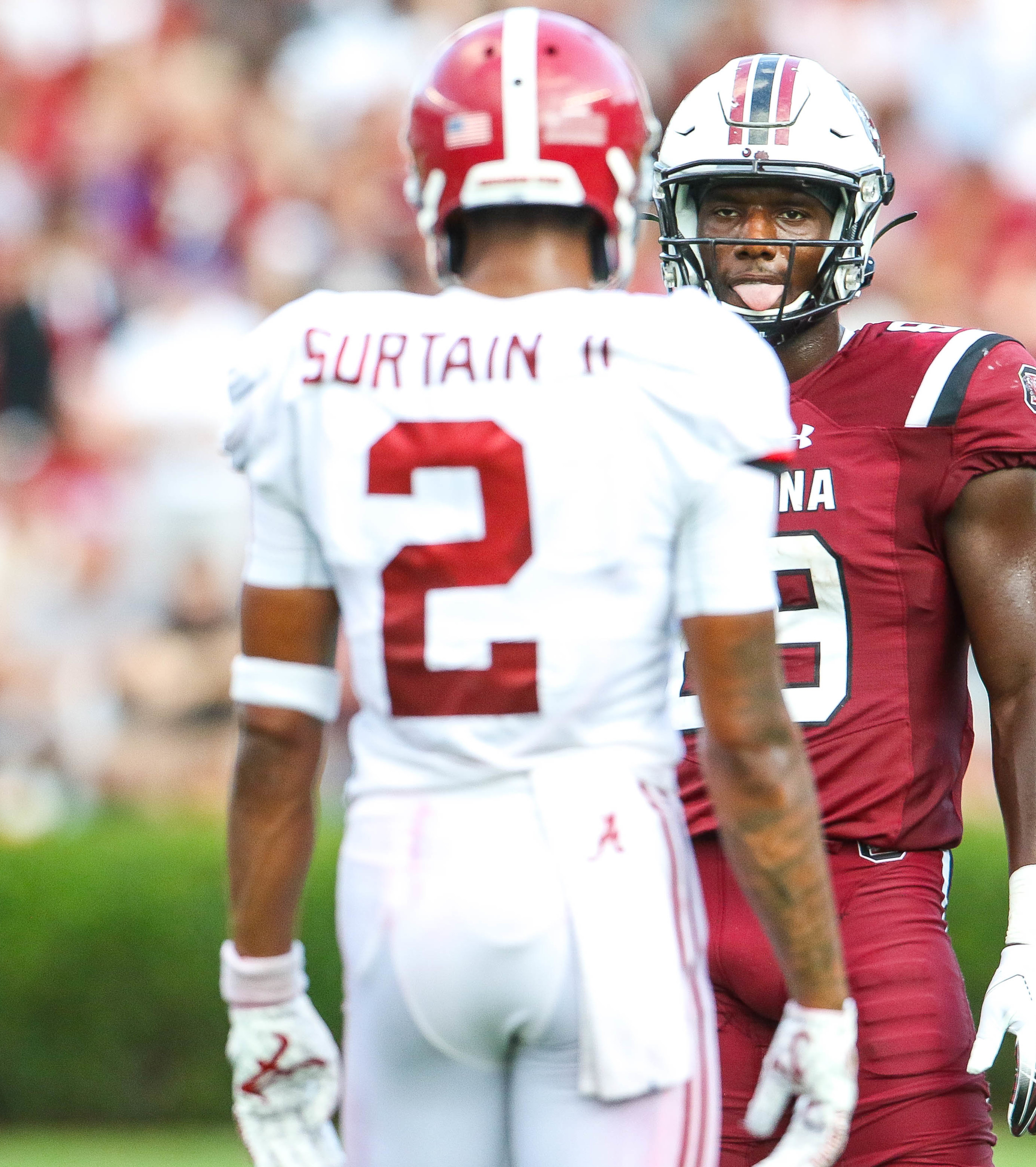
Surtain II with Alabama in 2019

As a true freshman at Alabama in 2018, Surtain II started 12 games and recorded 37 tackles and an interception. He returned to Alabama as a starter in 2019.

As a sophomore in 2019, he totaled 42 tackles, three forced fumbles, eight pass breakups, two interceptions (24 return yards), a fumble recovery, and one quarterback pressure.

In 2020, he again returned as a starter at cornerback, earning several preseason All-American honors. Surtain helped guide the Crimson Tide to a 13–0 record and a National Championship win over Ohio State.

He was named defensive MVP of the 2021 Rose Bowl. He declared for the NFL draft shortly afterwards.

== Professional career ==
=== Pre-draft ===
"When you look at the testing stuff and start there, it’s outstanding numbers. You kind of put him up, side by side, with Jalen Ramsey, just from a testing standpoint, it’s eerily similar. I think they were a pound different. Very similar across the board in what they did there."

— Daniel Jeremiah (NFL.com analyst)

Pro Football Focus ranked Surtain as the top cornerback prospect (13th overall) in the 2021 NFL draft. Mark Schofield of Touchdown Wire, Lorenz Leinweber of Sports Illustrated, and NFL analyst Bucky Brooks also ranked him as the top cornerback. Dane Brugler of The Athletic ranked him as the second best cornerback prospect. Rob Rang of Fox Sports had Surtain ranked as the best cornerback prospect (sixth overall). NFL analyst Daniel Jeremiah had Surtain ranked first among all cornerbacks (10th overall). Mel Kiper Jr. of ESPN had him as the second best cornerback (17th overall). NFL draft analysts unanimously projected Surtain to be selected in the first round.

External videos
- Alabama CB Patrick Surtain's Pro Day
- Patrick Surtain II 40-yard dash

"Pat’s got great physical ability, he's got great length, but he’s smart and very, very instinctive. So he always plays faster in the game. Because he is smart, he does a great job of preparing."

— Nick Saban (Alabama Head coach)

Pre-draft measurables
Height	Weight	Arm length	Hand span	Wingspan	40-yard dash	10-yard split	20-yard split	Vertical jump	Broad jump	Bench press
6 ft 2 in (1.88 m)	208 lb (94 kg)	32 1/2 in (0.83 m)	10 in (0.25 m)	6 ft 6 1/2 in (1.99 m)	4.41 s	1.57 s	2.60 s	39.0 in (0.99 m)	10 ft 11 in (3.33 m)	18 reps
All values from Pro Day

=== 2021 ===
The Denver Broncos selected Surtain in the first round (ninth overall) of the 2021 NFL draft. He was the second cornerback drafted, immediately after South Carolina cornerback Jaycee Horn (eighth overall).

External videos
- Broncos draft Surtain No. 9 overall
- NFL Draft Prospects: Patrick Surtain

"I see a guy who as a former defensive back coach I would love to be able to work with. He has all of the traits you're looking for in a big-time NFL player."

— Jim Mora Jr. (Sports Illustrated)

On May 18, 2021, the Broncos signed Surtain to a fully guaranteed four–year, $20.96 million contract that includes an initial signing bonus of $12.60 million.

Throughout training camp, he competed against Ronald Darby, Kyle Fuller, and Bryce Callahan to be the No. 1 starting cornerback following the departure of A. J. Bouye. Head coach Vic Fangio named Surtain the third cornerback on the depth chart to begin the regular season, behind starting veteran duo Ronald Darby and Kyle Fuller.

On September 12, 2021, Surtain made his professional regular season debut in the Denver Broncos' 27–13 victory at the New York Giants in their season-opener. He was limited to 16 snaps on defense and unfortunately gave up a 37–yard touchdown pass to Giants' wide receiver Sterling Shepard. Ronald Darby injured his hamstring during the Week 1 loss and was subsequently placed on injured reserve. Defensive coordinator Ed Donatell appointed Surtain as his replacement at starting cornerback during his absence. On September 19, 2021, Surtain earned his first career start and recorded four combined tackles (two solo), broke up a pass, and made his first career interception off a pass thrown by fellow rookie Trevor Lawrence to wide receiver Tyron Johnson during a 23–13 victory at the Jacksonville Jaguars. In Week 4, he racked up a season–high six solo tackles as the Broncos lost 7–23 to the Baltimore Ravens. On November 28, 2021, Surtain had five combined tackles (four solo), two pass deflections, a career-high two interception, and scored his first career touchdown during a 28–13 win over the Los Angeles Chargers. He made his second interception of the game during the fourth quarter on a pass thrown by Justin Herbert to running back Austin Ekeler and returned it for 70–yards to score a touchdown. His Week 11 performance earned him AFC Defensive Player of the Week. The following week, he made one solo tackle, a pass deflection, and intercepted a pass by Patrick Mahomes as the Broncos were routed 9–22 at the Kansas City Chiefs. He was inactive for a Week 18 loss to the Kansas City Chiefs due to a calf injury. He finished his rookie season in 2021 with 58 combined tackles (45 solo), 14 passes defended, four interceptions, and one touchdown in 16 games and 16 starts. He was named to the 2021 All-Rookie Team by Pro Football Focus and the Pro Football Writers of America.

=== 2022 ===
On January 27, 2022, the Denver Broncos hired Green Bay Packers' offensive coordinator Nathaniel Hackett as their new head coach. He entered training camp as the de facto No. 1 starting cornerback. Defensive coordinator Ejiro Evero named Surtain and Ronald Darby the starting cornerbacks to begin the season. On October 6, 2022, he collected a season–high eight combined tackles (six solo), made two pass deflections, and forced a fumble during a 23–32 loss at the Las Vegas Raiders. In Week 15, Surtain recorded six combined tackles (four solo), two pass deflections, and intercepted a pass thrown by Colt McCoy to DeAndre Hopkins as the Broncos defeated the Arizona Cardinals 24–15. On December 26, 2022, the Denver Broncos fired head coach Nathaniel Hackett after only 15 games where they compiled a record of 4–11. Assistant coach Jerry Rosburg was appointed as the interim head coach for the last two games of the season. He started in all 17 games during the 2022 NFL season and finished with a total of 60 combined tackles (46 solo), ten passes defended, two interceptions, and one forced fumble. He earned first team All-Pro honors and was invited to the 2023 Pro Bowl. He was ranked 49th by his fellow players on the NFL Top 100 Players of 2023.

=== 2023 ===
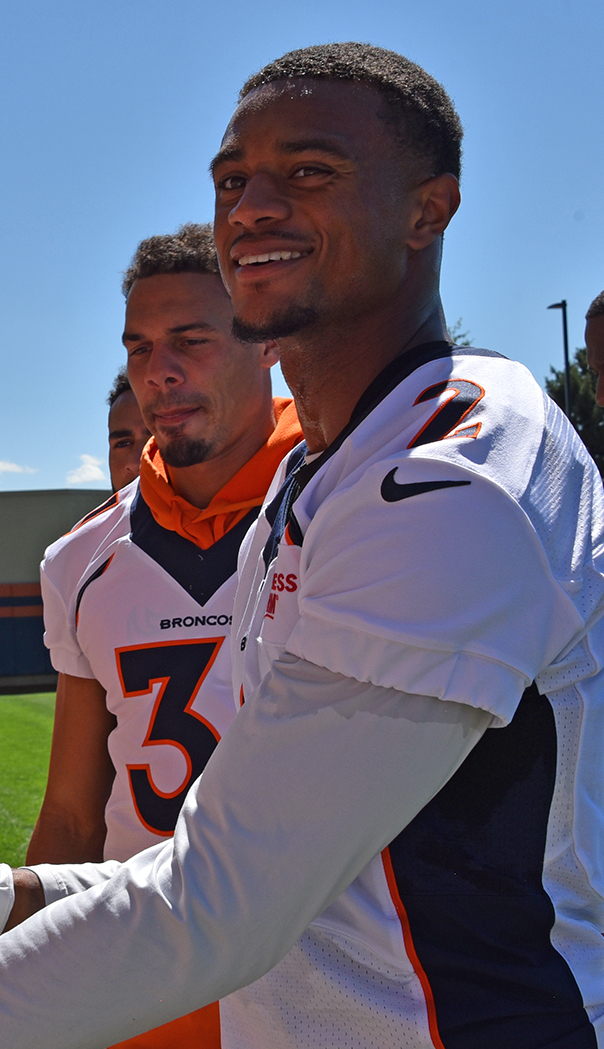
Surtain (right) in 2023

On February 3, 2023, the Denver Broncos officially acquired former New Orleans Saints' head coach Sean Payton in a trade to become their new head coach. This marked Surtain's third head coach and defensive coordinator in as many seasons. Surtain returned as the No. 1 starting cornerback under new defensive coordinator Vance Joseph and was paired with Damarri Mathis to start the regular season.

On September 10, 2023, Surtain started in the Denver Broncos' home–opener against the Las Vegas Raiders and made two solo tackles and a career–high three pass deflections during a 16–17 loss. On October 8, 2023, he recorded five combined tackles (four solo), one pass deflection, and made his only interception of the season off a pass attempt thrown by Zach Wilson to wide receiver Garrett Wilson as the Broncos lost 21–31 loss to the New York Jets. The following week, he collected a season–high seven solo tackles during an 8–19 loss at the Kansas City Chiefs in Week 6. He started in all 17 regular season games during the 2023 NFL season and had a career–high 69 combined tackles (59 solo), 12 pass deflections, and one interception. He earned Pro Bowl honors and was invited to play in the 2024 Pro Bowl. He was ranked 52nd by his fellow players on the NFL Top 100 Players of 2024.

=== 2024 ===
On April 23, 2024, the Denver Broncos exercised the one–year, $19.8 million fifth–year option on Surtain's rookie contract. He returned to training camp as the No. 1 starting cornerback and entered his second season under the same coaching staff for the first time of his career. Head coach Sean Payton named Surtain and Riley Moss the starting cornerbacks to begin the season.

On September 4, 2024, the Denver Broncos signed Surtain to a four–year, $96 million contract extension that includes $77.5 million guaranteed with $40.68 million guaranteed upon signing and an initial signing bonus of $15 million. The new deal kept him under contract through the 2029 NFL season and made him the highest paid defensive back in NFL history.

On September 8, 2024, Surtain started in the Denver Broncos' season–opener at the Seattle Seahawks and racked up a season–high six combined tackles (four solo) and broke up a pass during a 20–26 loss. On October 6, 2024, Surtain recorded three combined tackles (two solo), made two pass deflections, had a career–high tying two interceptions, and returned one for his second career touchdown during a 34–18 win against the Las Vegas Raiders. During the second quarter, Surtain intercepted a pass attempt thrown by Gardner Minshew to tight end Brock Bowers in the end–zone and returned it 100–yards to score a touchdown, becoming the second-longest pick-six in Broncos' franchise history, only behind Aqib Talib’s 103-yard interception return touchdown against the Dallas Cowboys in 2017. For his performance, Surtain was named AFC Defensive Player of the Week. On October 13, 2024, Surtain exited after the first defensive snap during a 16–23 loss against the Los Angeles Chargers after suffering a concussion during a collision with wide receiver Ladd McConkey while trying to break up a pass. He remained in concussion protocol and subsequently missed a Week 7 victory at the New Orleans Saints. He had started in 40 consecutive games prior to this injury and missed the first game since his rookie season. He returned the following week and made one solo tackle, one pass deflection, and intercepted a pass by Bryce Young during a 28–14 win against the Carolina Panthers in Week 8. He finished the season with a total of 45 combined tackles (34 solo), 11 pass deflections, four interceptions, one forced fumble, a fumble recovery, and one touchdown in 16 games and 16 starts. Surtain's 39 passes defended since 2021 are tied with Darius Slay for the league lead over that span.

On February 6, 2025, Surtain was named the 2024 AP NFL Defensive Player of the Year. Surtain was the second player in Broncos history to receive the honor, joining Hall of Fame linebacker Randy Gradishar who won it in 1978.

=== 2025 ===
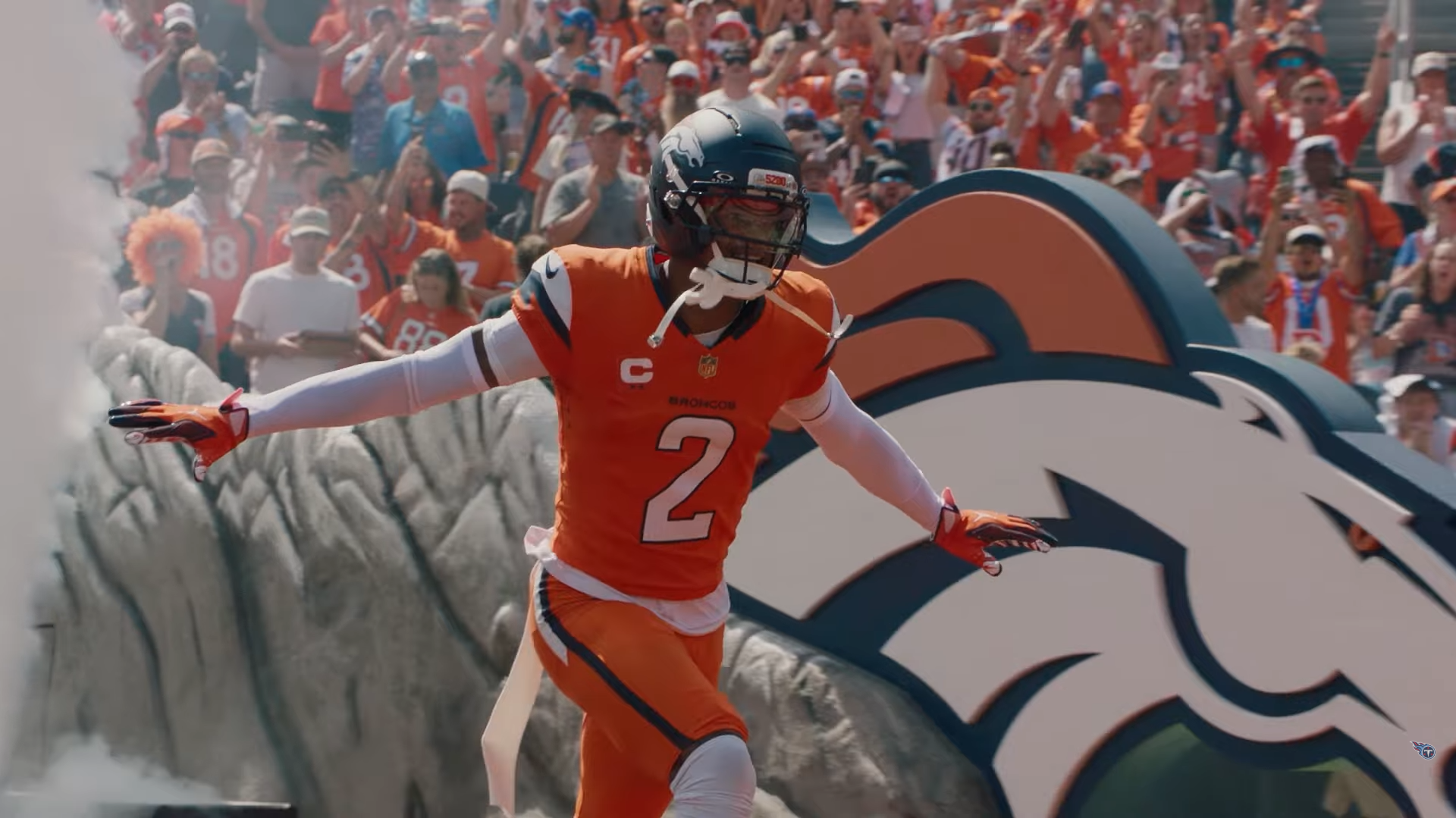
Surtain in 2025

In July 2025, Surtain became a Jordan Brand athlete, signing an endorsement deal after meeting with Michael Jordan in Greece. On the NFL Top 100 Players of 2025, Surtain was voted as the 10th-best player in the league by his fellow NFL players.

Due to a pectoral strain suffered in Week 8 against the Dallas Cowboys, Surtain missed Weeks 9 to 11. He returned to the field during Week 13 against the Washington Commanders.

In total, Surtain recorded 47 tackles (37 solo), one interception, and 12 passes defended during the 2025 season. He earned Pro Bowl honors for the fourth consecutive season.

=== 2026 ===
Due to consistent high-level performance, the Broncos gave Surtain a $5 million raise (with an additional $5 million in incentives) in his 2026 salary.

== Career statistics ==
Legend
	NFL Defensive Player of the Year
	Led the league
**Bold**	Career high

=== NFL ===
==== Regular season ====
Year	Team	Games		Tackles				Interceptions						Coverage			
Year	Team	GP	GS	Cmb	Solo	Ast	Sck	PD	Int	Yds	Avg	Lng	TD	Tgt	Cmp	Yds	TD
2021	DEN	16	15	58	45	13	0.0	**14**	**4**	70	18.0	70	**1**	**96**	49	545	3
2022	DEN	17	17	60	46	**14**	0.0	10	2	-3	-1.5	0	0	77	45	468	**4**
2023	DEN	17	17	**69**	**59**	10	0.0	12	1	0	0.0	0	0	91	**54**	**660**	3
2024	DEN	16	16	45	34	11	0.0	11	**4**	**132**	**33.0**	**100**	**1**	62	38	326	2
2025	DEN	14	14	47	37	10	0.0	12	1	0	0.0	0	0	61	33	305	1
2026	DEN	6	6	33	22	11	0.0	2	0	0	0.0	0	0	30	18	157	1
Career		86	85	312	243	69	0.0	61	12	199	16.6	100	2	417	237	2,419	14

==== Postseason ====
Year	Team	Games		Tackles				Interceptions						Coverage			
Year	Team	GP	GS	Cmb	Solo	Ast	Sck	PD	Int	Yds	Avg	Lng	TD	Tgt	Cmp	Yds	TD
2024	DEN	1	1	5	**4**	1	0.0	0	0	0	0.0	0	0	3	3	**79**	**1**
2025	DEN	2	2	**8**	**4**	**4**	0.0	**1**	0	0	0.0	0	0	**8**	**6**	43	**1**
Career		3	3	13	8	5	0.0	1	0	0	0.0	0	0	11	9	122	2

=== College ===
Year	Team	GP	Tackles					Interceptions					Fumbles			
Year	Team	GP	Cmb	Solo	Ast	TFL	Sck	Int	Yds	Avg	TD	PD	FF	FR	Yds	TD
2018	Alabama	15	37	28	9	1.5	0.0	1	20	20.0	0	7	1	0	0	0
2019	Alabama	13	**42**	**32**	10	1.0	0.0	**2**	24	12.0	0	8	**3**	**1**	0	0
2020	Alabama	13	38	22	**16**	**3.5**	0.0	1	**25**	**25.0**	**1**	**12**	0	**1**	0	0
Career		41	117	82	35	6.0	0.0	4	69	17.3	1	27	4	2	0	0

== Personal life ==
Surtain is the son of former All-Pro NFL cornerback, Patrick Surtain Sr. His mother is Michelle Surtain. He has two younger sisters: Paris and Parker. On July 24, 2026, Surtain announced his engagement to Kevia Higdon, his college sweetheart. The couple are expecting their first child together.

In 2023, he founded the Patrick Surtain II Foundation, a non-profit charity organization focused on assisting students in financially disadvantaged communities. His mother, Michelle, serves as the vice president of the foundation.

== See also ==
- List of second-generation National Football League players
