= Kingston Lopa =

American football player

No. 2 – California Golden Bears
- Position: Safety
- Class: Redshirt Sophomore

Personal information
- Listed height: 6 ft 5 in (1.96 m)
- Listed weight: 210 lb (95 kg)

Career information
- High school: Grant (Sacramento, California)
- College: Oregon (2024–2025); California (2026–present)
- Stats at ESPN

Kingston Lopa is an American football safety for the California Golden Bears. He previously played for the Oregon Ducks.

== Early life ==
Lopa attended Grant Union High School in Sacramento, California. As a senior, he had 67 tackles and four interceptions on defense and had 39 receptions for 711 yards with 16 touchdowns on offense. Lopa was selected to play in the 2024 Polynesian Bowl. He committed to the University of Oregon to play college football.

== College career ==
Lopa played 19 games for the Oregon Ducks from 2024 to 2025, recording 13 tackles and one sack. After the 2025 season he entered the transfer portal and committed to the California Golden Bears. He recorded an interception in the first game of the season and three, including one returned for a touchdown, in the second game.
