= Meridian High School (Washington) =

Location
- 194 W. Laurel Road; Bellingham, Washington 98226; 48°51′22″N 122°29′25″W

Information
- Type: Public
- Established: 1911
- Principal: Shaun Doffing
- Staff: 29 (FTE)
- Enrollment: 538 (2023-2024)
- Student to teacher ratio: 18.45
- Colors: Black, White & Gold
- Mascot: Trojans
- Information: (360) 398-8111

Meridian High School is a public secondary school located in the North-Whatcom community Laurel, Washington (north of Bellingham). During the 2010–11 school year, official enrollment was documented at 467 students in grades 9–12. It is currently the only high school in the Meridian School District.

The school district boundary (the high school's attendance boundary) includes a section of northern Bellingham.

== Athletics ==
Beginning in the 2006–07 school year, Meridian teams compete once again in the WIAA "1A" classification. From 1997 through 2006, Meridian was classified as "2A" but had been "1A" pre-1997.

=== State championships ===
The Trojans have won nine state championships.

Teams

- Football: 1999 (2A), 2003 (2A), 2006 (1A)
- Girls' Cross Country: 2025 (1A), 2026 (1A)
- Volleyball: 1998 (2A), 2004 (2A)
- Boys Golf: 2025 (1A)
- Girls' Soccer: 2007 (1A)

=== Academic State Championships ===
In addition to the seven state championships, Meridian has also won twelve academic state championships.

Teams

- Girls Golf: 1999 (2A), 2002 (2A), 2025 (1A)
- Girls Basketball: 2022 (1A), 2024 (1A)
- Girls Soccer: 2000 (2A), 2001 (2A)
- Baseball: 1996 (1A)
- Boys Cross Country: 1990 (1A)
- Boys Soccer: 1996 (1A)
- Boys Wrestling: 2002 (2A)
- Girls Wrestling: 2024 (1A)
