= Ian Strong =

American football player

No. 9 – California Golden Bears
- Position: Wide receiver
- Class: Senior

Personal information
- Listed height: 6 ft 4 in (1.93 m)
- Listed weight: 210 lb (95 kg)

Career information
- High school: St. Anthony's (South Huntington, New York)
- College: Rutgers (2023–2025); California (2026–present)
- Stats at ESPN

Ian Strong is an American college football wide receiver for the California Golden Bears. He previously played for the Rutgers Scarlet Knights.

== Early life ==
Strong attended St. Anthony's in South Huntington, New York, where he played both wide receiver and defensive back. As a senior, he was named the NYCHSFL AAA Defensive Player of the Year after recording 30 receptions for 797 yards and 10 touchdowns on offense and 80 tackles and three sacks on defense. He committed to Rutgers University to play college football.

== College career ==
=== Rutgers ===
In his first game as a true freshman at Rutgers in 2023, Strong had two catches for 24 yards and a touchdown. He finished the season with 16 receptions for 230 yards and two touchdowns. As a sophomore in 2024, he started 11 of 12 games and had 43 receptions for 676 yards and five touchdowns. Strong returned to Rutgers as the team's number one receiver in 2025.

On January 1, 2026, Strong announced that he would enter the transfer portal.

=== California ===
On January 5, 2026, Strong announced that he would transfer to California.
