= Meridian School District (Washington) =

School district in Washington, United States

Meridian School District is a public primary and secondary education school district located in Laurel, Washington. The district serves an area north of Bellingham and south of Lynden. The Meridian School District takes its name from the Meridian area. The main highway in the area is Guide Meridian Road, which is the local name of State Route 539. The district operates one high school, one middle school, and one elementary school. The district headquarters shares the Meridian High School campus at 214 W. Laurel Road.

The district includes a small section of the city limits of Bellingham.

Meridian High School (MHS) enrolls students in ninth, tenth, eleventh, and twelfth grades. The school is located at 194 W. Laurel Road, just a block west of State Route 539. MHS is a Washington Interscholastic Activities Association Division 1A school.

Meridian Middle School enrolls students in sixth, seventh, and eighth grades. The school is located at 861 Ten Mile Road. Meridian Middle School is just west of Ten Mile Creek Elementary School. After completing eighth grade, Meridian Middle School students continue their education at Meridian High School.

Irene Reither Primary School enrolls students in kindergarten through fifth grade. The school is located at 954 E. Hemmi Road.
