= Michael Hutchings (American football coach) =

American football coach (born 1995)

California Golden Bears
- Title: Defensive coordinator

Personal information
- Born: March 27, 1995 (age 31); San Francisco, California, U.S.

Career information
- Position: Linebacker
- College: University of Southern California

Career history
- USC (2018–2019) Graduate assistant; USC (2020) Defensive quality control analyst; Oregon (2021) Defensive analyst; Western Kentucky (2022) Outside linebackers coach; Minnesota Vikings (2023) Assistant defensive backs coach; Minnesota Vikings (2024–2025) Safeties coach; California (2026–present) Defensive coordinator
- Stats at Pro Football Reference

Michael Hutchings (born March 27, 1995) is an American football coach who is the defensive coordinator for the California Golden Bears. He joined the Minnesota Vikings of the National Football League (NFL) in 2023 as an assistant defensive backs coach and was promoted to safeties coach in 2024. Hutchings previously coached at USC, Oregon, and Western Kentucky before entering the NFL coaching ranks.

== Early life and education ==
Hutchings was born on March 27, 1995, in San Francisco, California. He attended De La Salle High School in Concord, California, where he was a prep All-American.

As a player, Hutchings was a four-year linebacker at USC from 2013 to 2016. He appeared in 52 games (15 starts), recording 118 tackles, eight tackles for loss, three sacks, two pass breakups, and one interception. He was a captain of the 2016 Rose Bowl-winning team and earned All-Pac-12 Honorable Mention honors. He earned a bachelor’s degree in communications from USC in 2017 and a master’s degree in communication management.

== Coaching career ==
After completing his playing career at USC, Hutchings began his coaching journey at his alma mater in 2018. He worked as a graduate assistant for the Trojans from 2018 to 2019, assisting with the linebacker group. In 2019, LB John Houston Jr. led the team in tackles with 104, and in 2018, Cameron Smith became the first USC player in nearly 40 years to lead the team in tackles for three consecutive seasons.

In 2020, Hutchings was promoted to defensive quality control analyst at USC. He played a key role in the development of S Talanoa Hufanga, who earned consensus All-American honors and was named the Pac-12 Defensive Player of the Year. DL Marlon Tuipulotu also made the All-Pac-12 First Team under Hutchings' guidance.

In 2021, Hutchings joined the Oregon coaching staff as a defensive analyst.

In 2022, Hutchings took on his first full-time position coaching role as the outside linebackers coach at Western Kentucky. His work with the Hilltoppers defense led to him being hired by the Minnesota Vikings ahead of the 2023 NFL season.

Hutchings entered the NFL ranks in 2023 as an assistant defensive backs coach with the Vikings. He helped guide a defensive turnaround that season, as the team improved from 31st in total defense in 2022 to 16th in 2023. The Vikings led the league in forced fumbles with 21, 14 of which came from defensive backs.

In 2024, Hutchings was selected to be a defensive backs coach at the Senior Bowl.

Promoted to safeties coach in 2024, Hutchings helped the Vikings post a 14–3 record. Minnesota led the NFL in several defensive categories, including interceptions (24), passes defensed (95), interceptions per attempt (3.8%), and opponent fourth-down conversion percentage (37.1%). The defense also tied for the league lead in takeaways (33) and recorded a takeaway in every regular season game, the longest such streak in franchise history.

Under his guidance, veteran safety Harrison Smith became just the sixth player in NFL history to surpass both 35 interceptions and 20 sacks in a career. Safeties Camryn Bynum and Josh Metellus each had standout years, with Bynum leading the team in tackles and Metellus starting all 17 games while contributing across multiple positions on defense. Hutchings also played a key role in the development of rookie CB Mekhi Blackmon, who made an impact in his first NFL season.

On December 19, 2025, Hutchings accepted the defensive coordinator position coaching California Golden Bears football.
