= 2026 Atlantic Coast Conference football season =

Sports season

2026 ACC Football season
- League: NCAA Division I Football Bowl Subdivision
- Sport: Football
- Duration: August 29 to December 5, 2026
- Teams: 17

2027 NFL draft

Regular season

ACC Championship Game
- Date: December 5, 2026
- Venue: Bank of America Stadium, Charlotte, North Carolina

Seasons
- ← 2025 2027 →

2026 Atlantic Coast Conference football standings
	Conf.			Overall
Team	W		L	W		L
No. 7 Miami (FL) y	8	–	0	10	–	1
No. 11 Wake Forest y	7	–	1	10	–	1
No. 23 Louisville	7	–	2	8	–	3
Clemson	5	–	3	7	–	4
SMU	5	–	3	7	–	4
Duke	4	–	4	7	–	4
Stanford	4	–	4	6	–	5
Virginia	4	–	4	6	–	5
Boston College	3	–	4	5	–	6
Pittsburgh	3	–	5	6	–	5
Virginia Tech	3	–	5	6	–	5
NC State	3	–	5	5	–	6
Florida State	3	–	5	5	–	6
Syracuse	3	–	6	5	–	6
North Carolina	2	–	5	5	–	6
California	2	–	6	3	–	8
Georgia Tech	2	–	6	3	–	8
Championship: Miami (FL) vs. Wake Forest
^ – College Football Playoff participant; $ – Conference champion; y – Championship game participant; As of November 22, 2026; Rankings from CFP rankings

The 2026 Atlantic Coast Conference football season, part of the 2026 NCAA Division I FBS football season, will be the 74th season of college football play for the Atlantic Coast Conference (ACC). The entire schedule was released on January 26, 2026.

The Duke Blue Devils are the defending conference champions, having defeated the Virginia Cavaliers in the 2025 ACC Championship Game.

== Preseason ==
=== Recruiting classes ===
National rankings
Team	ESPN	24/7	On3 Recruits	Total signees
Boston College	48	53	55	24
California	64	56	52	18
Clemson	19	20	21	23
Duke	62	71	70	15
Florida State	15	16	14	34
Georgia Tech	47	41	38	24
Louisville	42	48	49	21
Miami (FL)	10	9	9	33
North Carolina	14	19	17	41
NC State	46	49	48	28
Pittsburgh	43	44	45	21
Stanford	30	37	39	24
SMU	22	32	24	24
Syracuse	27	35	33	27
Virginia	NR	111	96	14
Virginia Tech	21	30	29	23
Wake Forest	45	39	41	30

Note: ESPN only ranks the top 75 teams.

=== ACC Kickoff ===
The 2026 ACC Kickoff was held from July 15–17 at the Hilton Charlotte Uptown in Charlotte, North Carolina. Coverage of the three day event will be televised by the ACC Network.

The schedule for the teams is as follows:

Date	Team
July 15	Florida State
July 15	Miami (FL)
July 15	NC State
July 15	Stanford
July 15	Virginia

Date	Team
July 16	Boston College
July 16	Clemson
July 16	Georgia Tech
July 16	Louisville
July 16	Syracuse
July 16	Virginia Tech

Date	Team
July 17	California
July 17	Duke
July 17	North Carolina
July 17	Pitt
July 17	SMU
July 17	Wake Forest

==== Preseason media polls ====
On July 28, 2026, the league released the preseason poll as voted on by 183 media members during ACC Kickoff.

Predicted finish	Team	Votes (1st place)
1	Miami	3159 (165)
2	SMU	2794 (6)
3	Louisville	2569 (4)
4	Clemson	2520 (7)
5	Georgia Tech	2006 (2)
6	Virginia	1981
7	NC State	1964
8	Virginia Tech	1962
9	Pitt	1740
10	Duke	1452
11	Florida State	1439 (3)
12	California	1392
13	Wake Forest	1103
14	Syracuse	878
15	North Carolina	831
16	Boston College	491
17	Stanford	483 (1)

=== Preseason ACC Player of the year ===
Ranking	Player	Position	Team	Votes
1	Darian Mensah	QB	Miami	97
2	Kevin Jennings	QB	SMU	25
3	Isaac Brown	RB	Louisville	16
4	CJ Bailey	QB	NC State	15
5	Duce Robinson	WR	Florida State	12
6	Sammy Brown	LB	Clemson	11
7	Kam Robinson	LB	Virginia	5
8	Will Heldt	DE	Clemson	4
9	Mason Heintschel	QB	Pittsburgh	3

=== Preseason all-conference teams ===
==== Offense ====
Position	Player	School	Votes
Quarterback	Darian Mensah	Miami	112
Running back	Mark Fletcher Jr.	Miami	127
Running back	Isaac Brown	Louisville	94
Wide receiver	Malachi Toney	Miami	164
Wide receiver	Duce Robinson	Florida State	131
Wide receiver	Bryant Wesco	Clemson	64
Tight end	Jeremiah Hasley	Duke	61
All-Purpose	Malachi Toney	Miami	94
Tackle	P. J. Williams	SMU	96
Tackle	McKale Boley	Virginia	77
Guard	Noah Josey	Virginia	71
Guard	Samson Okunlola	Miami	53
Center	Josh Bates	SMU	64

==== Defense ====
Position	Player	School	Votes
Defensive end	Will Heldt	Clemson	87
Defensive end	Clev Lubin	Louisville	79
Defensive tackle	Ahmad Moten Sr.	Miami	126
Defensive tackle	Kemari Copeland	Virginia Tech	89
Linebacker	Sammy Brown	Clemson	139
Linebacker	Kam Robinson	Virginia	98
Linebacker	Mohamed Toure	Miami	64
Cornerback	Ashton Hampton	Clemson	81
Cornerback	Chris Peal	Syracuse	45
Safety	Bryce Fitzgerald	Miami	86
Safety	KP Price	Boston College	45

==== Specialist ====
Position	Player	School	Votes
Placekicker	Aidan Birr	Georgia Tech	105
Punter	Daniel Sparks	Virginia	48
Specialist	Malachi Toney	Miami	104

=== Preseason awards ===
==== All–American teams ====
	AP 1st Team	AP 2nd Team	AS 1st Team	AS 2nd Team	AS 3rd Team	AS 4th Team	WCFF 1st Team	WCFF 2nd Team	ESPN 1st Team	ESPN 2nd Team	CBS 1st Team	CBS 2nd Team	SN 1st Team	SN 2nd Team	USAT 1st Team	USAT 2nd Team	SI 1st Team	SI 2nd Team
Cooper Barkate, WR, Miami						✓												
Aidan Birr, K, Georgia Tech					✓												✓	
Isaac Brown, RB, Louisville				✓									✓					✓
Sammy Brown, LB, Clemson		✓			✓		✓		✓		✓				✓			
Bryce Fitzgerald, DB, Miami								✓								✓		
Mark Fletcher Jr., RB, Miami		✓			✓					✓		✓				✓		✓
Justice Haynes, RB, Georgia Tech						✓												
Clev Lubin, DL, Louisville					✓								✓					
Ahmad Moten Sr., DL, Miami						✓			✓			✓				✓		
Chris Peal, CB, Syracuse													✓					
Duce Robinson, WR, Florida State		✓	✓															✓
Daniel Sparks, P, Virginia																		✓
Malachi Toney, WR, Miami	✓		✓		✓		✓		✓		✓	✓			✓		✓	
Bryant Wesco, WR, Clemson						✓												
P. J. Williams, OL, SMU						✓												

==== Preseason award watchlists ====
Award	Head Coach/player	School	Position	Year	Ref
Lott Trophy	Sammy Brown	Clemson	LB	Jr.	
Lott Trophy	Fisher Camac	Virginia	DE	Sr.	
Lott Trophy	Bryce Fitzgerald	Miami	DB	So.	
Lott Trophy	Clev Lubin	Louisville	DL	Sr.	
Lott Trophy	Luke Mergott	Duke	LB	Jr.	
Lott Trophy	Damon Wilson II	Miami	DL	Sr.	
Dodd Trophy	Jeff Brohm	Louisville	HC		
Dodd Trophy	Mario Cristobal	Miami	HC		
Dodd Trophy	Brent Key	Georgia Tech	HC		
Maxwell Award	Jaron-Keawe Sagapolutele	California	QB	So.	
Maxwell Award	Nate Sheppard	Duke	RB	So.	
Maxwell Award	Duce Robinson	Florida State	WR	Sr.	
Maxwell Award	Justice Haynes	Georgia Tech	RB	Sr.	
Maxwell Award	Isaac Brown	Louisville	RB	Jr.	
Maxwell Award	Darian Mensah	Miami	QB	Jr.	
Maxwell Award	Malachi Toney	Miami	WR	So.	
Maxwell Award	Mark Fletcher Jr.	Miami	RB	Sr.	
Maxwell Award	CJ Bailey	NC State	QB	Jr.	
Maxwell Award	Mason Heintschel	Pittsburgh	QB	So.	
Maxwell Award	Kevin Jennings	SMU	QB	Sr.	
Davey O'Brien Award	Jaron-Keawe Sagapolutele	California	QB	So.	
Davey O'Brien Award	Darian Mensah	Miami	QB	R-Jr.	
Davey O'Brien Award	CJ Bailey	NC State	QB	Jr.	
Davey O'Brien Award	Kevin Jennings	SMU	QB	R-Sr.	
Doak Walker Award	Evan Dickens	Boston College	RB	Sr.	
Doak Walker Award	Adam Mohammed	California	RB	Jr.	
Doak Walker Award	Ousmane Kromah	Florida State	RB	Sr.	
Doak Walker Award	Quintrevion Wisner	Florida State	RB	Sr.	
Doak Walker Award	Justice Haynes	Georgia Tech	RB	Sr.	
Doak Walker Award	Malachi Hosley	Georgia Tech	RB	Sr.	
Doak Walker Award	Mark Fletcher Jr.	Miami	RB	Sr.	
Doak Walker Award	Demon June	North Carolina	RB	So.	
Doak Walker Award	Jayden Scott Jr.	NC State	RB	Jr.	
Doak Walker Award	Kendrick Raphael	SMU	RB	Sr.	
Doak Walker Award	Peyton Lewis	Virginia	RB	Jr.	
Doak Walker Award	Marcellous Hawkins	Virginia Tech	RB	Gr.	
Biletnikoff Award	Chase Hendricks	California	WR	Sr.	
Biletnikoff Award	Ian Strong	California	WR	Sr.	
Biletnikoff Award	T. J. Moore	Clemson	WR	Jr.	
Biletnikoff Award	Javen Nicholas	Duke	WR	Gr.	
Biletnikoff Award	Duce Robinson	Florida State	WR	Sr.	
Biletnikoff Award	Tre Richardson	Louisville	WR	Sr.	
Biletnikoff Award	Cooper Barkate	Miami	WR	R-Sr.	
Biletnikoff Award	Malachi Toney	Miami	WR	So.	
Biletnikoff Award	Victor Snow	NC State	WR	R-Sr.	
Biletnikoff Award	Que'Sean Brown	Virginia Tech	WR	R-Jr.	
John Mackey Award	Dorian Thomas	California	TE	R-Jr.	
John Mackey Award	Jeremiah Hasley	Duke	TE	GS	
John Mackey Award	Chris Corbo	Georgia Tech	TE	R-Sr.	
John Mackey Award	Brody Foley	Louisville	TE	R-Sr.	
John Mackey Award	Elija Lofton	Miami	TE	Jr.	
John Mackey Award	Jelani Thurman	North Carolina	TE	R-Jr.	
John Mackey Award	Randy Pittman Jr.	SMU	TE	Sr.	
John Mackey Award	Luke Reynolds	Virginia Tech	TE	Jr.	
Rimington Trophy	Matt Craycraft	Duke	C	GS	
Rimington Trophy	Ryan Carretta	Pittsburgh	C	R-Jr.	
Rimington Trophy	Joshua Bates	SMU	C	R-Jr.	

Award	Head Coach/player	School	Position	Year	Ref
Butkus Award	Sammy Brown	Clemson	LB	Jr.	
Butkus Award	Luke Mergott	Duke	LB	Sr.	
Butkus Award	Kyle Efford	Georgia Tech	LB	R-Sr.	
Butkus Award	Mohamed Toure	Miami	LB	GS	
Butkus Award	Peyton Seelmann	North Carolina	LB	Jr.	
Butkus Award	Braylan Lovelace	Pittsburgh	LB	Sr.	
Butkus Award	Matt Rose	Stanford	LB	5Y Sr.	
Butkus Award	Gary Bryant III	Syracuse	LB	5Y Sr.	
Butkus Award	Kam Robinson	Virginia	LB	Sr.	
Jim Thorpe Award	Ashton Hampton	Clemson	CB	Jr.	
Jim Thorpe Award	Bryce Fitzgerald	Miami	S	So.	
Jim Thorpe Award	Chris Peal	Syracuse	CB	R-Jr.	
Bronko Nagurski Trophy	Melkart Abou Jaoude	North Carolina	DE	R-Jr.	
Bronko Nagurski Trophy	Sammy Brown	Clemson	LB	Jr.	
Bronko Nagurski Trophy	Kemari Copeland	Virginia Tech	DT	R-Sr.	
Bronko Nagurski Trophy	Koen Entringer	Louisville	S	R-Jr.	
Bronko Nagurski Trophy	Bryce Fitzgerald	Miami	S	So.	
Bronko Nagurski Trophy	Clev Lubin	Louisville	DE	R-Jr.	
Bronko Nagurski Trophy	Ahmad Moten Sr.	Miami	DT	R-Sr.	
Bronko Nagurski Trophy	Kam Robinson	Virginia	LB	Sr.	
Bronko Nagurski Trophy	Matt Rose	Stanford	LB	R-Sr.	
Bronko Nagurski Trophy	Damon Wilson II	Miami	DE	Sr.	
Outland Trophy	Ryan Baer	Pittsburgh	OT	R-Sr.	
Outland Trophy	Joshua Bates	SMU	C	R-Jr.	
Outland Trophy	Malachi Carney	Georgia Tech	G	R-Sr.	
Outland Trophy	Kemari Copeland	Virginia Tech	DT	R-Sr.	
Outland Trophy	Noah Josey	Virginia	G	GS	
Outland Trophy	Matthew McCoy	Miami	OT	R-Sr.	
Outland Trophy	Ahmad Moten Sr.	Miami	DT	R-Sr.	
Outland Trophy	Lance Robinson	Louisville	C	GS	
Outland Trophy	BJ Williams	Pittsburgh	G	Sr.	
Outland Trophy	P. J. Williams	SMU	OT	R-Sr.	
Lou Groza Award	Luca Lombardo	Boston College	K	Sr.	
Lou Groza Award	Nolan Hauser	Clemson	K	Jr.	
Lou Groza Award	Gabe Panikowski	Florida State	K	Sr.	
Lou Groza Award	Aidan Birr	Georgia Tech	K	Sr.	
Lou Groza Award	Jack Olsen	Miami	K	Sr.	
Lou Groza Award	Will Bettridge	Virginia	K	GS	
Ray Guy Award	Daniel Hughes	Florida State	P	Sr.	
Ray Guy Award	Dylan Joyce	Miami	P	Sr.	
Ray Guy Award	Daniel Sparks	Virginia	P	R-Sr.	
Paul Hornung Award	Adam Mohammed	California	RB	Jr.	
Paul Hornung Award	Tre Richardson	Louisville	WR	Sr.	
Paul Hornung Award	Malachi Toney	Miami	WR	So.	
Paul Hornung Award	Jayden Scott	NC State	RB	Jr.	
Paul Hornung Award	Demetres Samuel	Syracuse	CB/WR	So.	
Paul Hornung Award	Solomon Beebe	Virginia	RB	Jr.	
Wuerffel Trophy	Josiah Griffin	Boston College	DL	R-Jr.	
Wuerffel Trophy	Jordan King	California	WR	R-Sr.	
Wuerffel Trophy	Gideon Davidson	Clemson	RB	So.	
Wuerffel Trophy	Micah Sahakian	Duke	OL	GS	
Wuerffel Trophy	Duce Robinson	Florida State	WR	Sr.	
Wuerffel Trophy	Jordan Walker	Georgia Tech	DE	5Y Sr.	
Wuerffel Trophy	Clev Lubin	Louisville	DE	R-Sr.	
Wuerffel Trophy	Ahmad Moten Sr.	Miami	DL	R-Sr.	
Wuerffel Trophy	Jordan Shipp	North Carolina	WR	Jr.	
Wuerffel Trophy	Isaiah Shirley	NC State	DT	Sr.	
Wuerffel Trophy	Mason Heintschel	Pittsburgh	QB	So.	
Wuerffel Trophy	Alexander Kilgore	SMU	LB	Sr.	
Wuerffel Trophy	Braden Marceau-Olayinka	Stanford	DL	R-Jr.	
Wuerffel Trophy	Cornell Perry	Syracuse	DB	5Y Sr.	
Wuerffel Trophy	Ethan Minter	Virginia	S	Jr.	
Wuerffel Trophy	Marcellous Hawkins	Virginia Tech	RB	R-Sr.	
Walter Camp Award	Sammy Brown	Clemson	LB	Jr.	
Walter Camp Award	Duce Robinson	Florida State	WR	Sr.	
Walter Camp Award	Isaac Brown	Louisville	RB	Jr.	
Walter Camp Award	Mark Fletcher Jr.	Miami	RB	Sr.	
Walter Camp Award	Darian Mensah	Miami	QB	R-Jr.	
Walter Camp Award	Malachi Toney	Miami	WR/PR	So.	
Walter Camp Award	CJ Bailey	NC State	QB	Jr.	
Walter Camp Award	Kevin Jennings	SMU	QB	R-Sr.	
Jet Award	Malachi Toney	Miami	WR	So.	
Jet Award	Solomon Beebe	Virginia	RB	Jr.	
Jet Award	Kam Shanks	Wake Forest	WR	R-Jr.	
Patrick Mannelly Award	Adam Booker	Miami	LS	R-Sr.	
Patrick Mannelly Award	Christian Epling	Virginia Tech	LS	R-Sr.	
Patrick Mannelly Award	Morgan Tribbett	SMU	LS	Jr.	
Patrick Mannelly Award	Peyton Warford	Stanford	LS	R-Sr.	

Award	Head Coach/player	School	Position	Year	Ref
Bednarik Award	Sammy Brown	Clemson	LB	Jr.	
Bednarik Award	Ashton Hampton	Clemson	CB	Jr.	
Bednarik Award	Ja'Bril Rawls	Florida State	CB	R-Jr.	
Bednarik Award	Clev Lubin	Louisville	DE	R-Sr.	
Bednarik Award	Ahmad Moten Sr.	Miami	DT	R-Sr.	
Bednarik Award	Damon Wilson II	Miami	DE	Sr.	
Bednarik Award	Melkart Abou Jaoude	North Carolina	DE	R-Sr.	
Bednarik Award	Braylan Lovelace	Pittsburgh	LB	Sr.	
Bednarik Award	Matt Rose	Stanford	LB	R-Sr.	
Bednarik Award	Kam Robinson	Virginia	LB	Sr.	
Bednarik Award	Kemari Copeland	Virginia Tech	DT	R-Sr.	
Bednarik Award	Langston Hardy	Wake Forest	DE	R-Sr.	
Rotary Lombardi Award	Sammy Brown	Clemson	LB	Jr.	
Rotary Lombardi Award	Clev Lubin	Louisville	Edge	R-Sr.	
Polynesian Football Player of the Year Award	Jaron-Keawe Sagapolutele	California	QB	So.	
Polynesian Football Player of the Year Award	AJ Tuitele	California	LB	R-Fr.	
Polynesian Football Player of the Year Award	Sioape Vatikani	California	OL	R-Sr.	
Polynesian Football Player of the Year Award	Abel Hoopii	SMU	OL	So.	
Polynesian Football Player of the Year Award	Simione Pale	Stanford	OL	Sr.	
Polynesian Football Player of the Year Award	Tevarua Tafiti	Stanford	DE	R-Sr.	
Polynesian Football Player of the Year Award	Dallas Afalava	Wake Forest	DL	Sr.	
Manning Award	Jaron-Keawe Sagapolutele	California	QB	So.	
Manning Award	Walker Eget	Duke	QB	R-Sr.	
Manning Award	Darian Mensah	Duke	QB	R-Jr.	
Manning Award	CJ Bailey	NC State	QB	Jr.	
Manning Award	Mason Heintschel	Pittsburgh	QB	So.	
Manning Award	Kevin Jennings	SMU	QB	R-Sr.	
Johnny Unitas Golden Arm Award	CJ Bailey	NC State	QB	Jr.	
Johnny Unitas Golden Arm Award	Kevin Jennings	SMU	QB	R-Sr.	
Earl Campbell Tyler Rose Award	Bryant Wesco	Clemson	WR	Jr.	
Earl Campbell Tyler Rose Award	Matt Craycraft	Duke	C	Gr.	
Earl Campbell Tyler Rose Award	Quintrevion Wisner	Florida State	RB	Sr.	
Earl Campbell Tyler Rose Award	Kevin Jennings	SMU	QB	R-Sr.	
Earl Campbell Tyler Rose Award	P. J. Williams	SMU	OL	R-Sr.	
Earl Campbell Tyler Rose Award	Byron Washington	Syracuse	OL	So.	
Earl Campbell Tyler Rose Award	Chico Holt	Stanford	TE	R-Jr.	
Earl Campbell Tyler Rose Award	Wondame Davis Jr.	Wake Forest	WR	R-So.	

== Head coaches ==
=== Coaching changes ===
==== Virginia Tech ====
In September of 2025 after an 0–3 start, Virginia Tech fired head coach Brent Pry. On November 17, 2025, James Franklin was announced as the Hokies' next head coach after he was fired from Penn State in October.

==== California ====
In November of 2025, the California Golden Bears fired nine-year head coach Justin Wilcox. On December 4, 2025, Oregon defensive coordinator Tosh Lupoi was hired as the Bears' next head coach.

==== Stanford ====
Tavita Pritchard was named Stanford's head football coach on November 28, 2025, to replace interim head coach Frank Reich.

=== Head coaching records ===
Team	Head coach	Years at school	Overall record	Record at school	ACC record
Boston College	Bill O'Brien	3	24–25	9–16	5–11
California	Tosh Lupoi	1	0–0	0–0	0–0
Clemson	Dabo Swinney	18	187–53	187–53	113–29
Duke	Manny Diaz	3	39–24	18–9	11–5
Florida State	Mike Norvell	7	76–49	38–34	22–26
Georgia Tech	Brent Key	4	27–20	27–20	20–11
Louisville	Jeff Brohm	4	94–56	28–12	16–8
Miami (FL)	Mario Cristobal	5	97–79	35–19	18–14
North Carolina	Bill Belichick	2	4–8	4–8	2–6
NC State	Dave Doeren	14	118–74	95–70	51–55
Pittsburgh	Pat Narduzzi	12	80–61	80–61	52–39
SMU	Rhett Lashlee	5	40–16	40–16	15–2
Stanford	Tavita Pritchard	1	0–0	0–0	0–0
Syracuse	Fran Brown	3	13–12	13–12	6–10
Virginia	Tony Elliott	5	22–26	22–26	13–18
Virginia Tech	James Franklin	1	128–60	0–0	0–0
Wake Forest	Jake Dickert	2	32–24	9–4	4–4

Notes:

- Years at school includes 2026 season.
- Coaches shown are the coaches who began the 2026 season as head coach of each team.

== Rankings ==
Legend
	Improvement in ranking
	Drop in ranking
	Not ranked previous week
RV	Received votes but were not ranked in Top 25 of poll
т	Tied with team above or below also with this symbol

		Pre	Wk 1	Wk 2	Wk 3	Wk 4	Wk 5	Wk 6	Wk 7	Wk 8	Wk 9	Wk 10	Wk 11	Wk 12	Wk 13	Wk 14	Final
Boston College	AP	—	—	—	—	—	—	—	—	—	—	—	—	—			
Boston College	C	—	—	—	—	—	—	—	—	—	—	—	—	—			
Boston College	CFP	Not released									—	—	—				
California	AP	RV	—	—	—	—	—	—	—	—	—	—	—	—			
California	C	RV	—	—	—	—	—	—	—	—	—	—	—	—			
California	CFP	Not released									—	—	—				
Clemson	AP	RV	—	—	—	—	—	—	—	—	—	—	—	—			
Clemson	C	23	RV	RV	RV	RV	—	—	—	—	—	—	—	RV			
Clemson	CFP	Not released									—	—	—				
Duke	AP	—	—	—	RV	RV	RV	RV	—	—	RV	RV	RV	RV			
Duke	C	RV	RV	RV	RV	21	23	RV	RV	RV	RV	RV	24	RV			
Duke	CFP	Not released									—	—	—				
Florida State	AP	—	—	—	—	—	—	—	—	—	—	—	—	—			
Florida State	C	RV	—	—	—	—	—	—	—	—	—	—	—	—			
Florida State	CFP	Not released									—	—	—				
Georgia Tech	AP	RV	—	—	—	—	—	—	—	—	—	—	—	—			
Georgia Tech	C	RV	—	—	—	—	—	—	—	—	—	—	—	—			
Georgia Tech	CFP	Not released									—	—	—				
Louisville	AP	24	24	23	16	RV	—	—	—	—	RV	RV	21	18			
Louisville	C	RV	RV	RV	19	RV	—	—	—	—	—	RV	22	18			
Louisville	CFP	Not released									—	—	23				
Miami	AP	7 (1)	7 (1)	5 (4)	6 (1)	4 (1)	4 (2)	3 (2)	1 (40)	1 (59)	1 (62)	5	5	4			
Miami	C	7	7	5 (2)	5 (1)	4	4	3 (1)	1 (50)	1 (67)	1 (68)	6	6	4			
Miami	CFP	Not released									1	7	7				
North Carolina	AP	—	—	—	—	—	—	—	—	—	—	—	—	—			
North Carolina	C	—	RV	—	—	—	—	RV	RV	—	—	—	—	—			
North Carolina	CFP	Not released									—	—	—				
NC State	AP	—	—	—	—	—	—	—	—	—	—	—	—	—			
NC State	C	RV	—	—	—	—	—	—	—	—	—	—	—	—			
NC State	CFP	Not released									—	—	—				
Pittsburgh	AP	RV	RV	RV	RV	RV	25	—	—	—	—	—	—	—			
Pittsburgh	C	RV	RV	RV	RV	RV	24	RV	RV	—	—	—	—	—			
Pittsburgh	CFP	Not released									—	—	—				
SMU	AP	19	17	16	22	21	24	24	23	19	RV	25	RV	—			
SMU	C	20	17	16	25	19	21	22	20	16	24	23	RV	RV			
SMU	CFP	Not released									—	—	—				
Stanford	AP	—	—	—	—	—	—	—	—	—	—	—	—	—			
Stanford	C	—	—	—	—	—	—	—	—	—	—	—	—	—			
Stanford	CFP	Not released									—	—	—				
Syracuse	AP	—	—	—	—	—	—	—	—	—	—	—	—	—			
Syracuse	C	—	—	—	—	—	—	—	—	—	—	—	—	—			
Syracuse	CFP	Not released									—	—	—				
Virginia	AP	RV	25	25	—	—	—	—	—	—	—	—	—	—			
Virginia	C	RV	25т	25	—	RV	—	—	—	—	—	—	RV	—			
Virginia	CFP	Not released									—	—	—				
Virginia Tech	AP	RV	RV	RV	RV	RV	—	—	—	RV	RV	—	—	—			
Virginia Tech	C	RV	RV	RV	RV	RV	RV	—	—	RV	RV	—	—	—			
Virginia Tech	CFP	Not released									—	—	—				
Wake Forest	AP	—	—	—	—	RV	RV	21	17	14	14	11	10	8			
Wake Forest	C	—	—	RV	—	RV	RV	23	19	15	14	11	10	8			
Wake Forest	CFP	Not released									16	13	11				

== Schedule ==
The schedule was released on January 25, 2026. The season began on August 29, 2026, with four ACC games in Week 0, including a conference matchup between NC State and Virginia. The regular season will end with the ACC Championship Game on December 5, 2026.

=== Regular season ===
==== Week Zero ====
Date	Time	Visiting team	Home team	Site	TV	Result	Attendance	Ref.
August 29	Noon	North Carolina	TCU	Aviva Stadium • Dublin, Ireland (Aer Lingus College Football Classic)	ESPN	W 15–10	40,457	
August 29	3:30 p.m.	NC State	Virginia	Scott Stadium • Charlottesville, VA	ESPN	UVA 34–8	62,779	
August 29	7:00 p.m.	New Mexico State	Florida State	Doak Campbell Stadium • Tallahassee, FL	The CW	W 34–17	65,915	
August 29	7:00 p.m.	Hawaii	Stanford	Stanford Stadium • Stanford, CA	ACCN	W 37–27	23,222	
^{#}Rankings from AP Poll. All times are in Eastern Time.

==== Week One ====
Date	Time	Visiting team	Home team	Site	TV	Result	Attendance	Ref.
September 3	7:00 p.m.	Akron	Wake Forest	Allegacy Federal Credit Union Stadium • Winston-Salem, NC	ACCN	W 38–16	30,735	
September 3	8:00 p.m.	Colorado	Georgia Tech	Bobby Dodd Stadium • Atlanta, GA	ESPN	L 13–14	52,113	
September 4	9:00 p.m.	No. 7 Miami (FL)	Stanford	Stanford Stadium • Stanford, CA	ESPN	MIA 45–6	37,648	
September 5	Noon	New Hampshire	Syracuse	JMA Wireless Dome • Syracuse, NY	ACCN	W 66–3	33,257	
September 5	12:30 p.m.	Miami (OH)	Pittsburgh	Acrisure Stadium • Pittsburgh, PA	The CW	W 59–14	43,929	
September 5	3:30 p.m.	Boston College	Cincinnati	Nippert Stadium • Cincinnati, OH	FOX	L 15–34	37,097	
September 5	3:30 p.m.	Tulane	Duke	Wallace Wade Stadium • Durham, NC	ACCN	W 17–3	16,113	
September 5	7:30 p.m.	VMI	Virginia Tech	Lane Stadium • Blacksburg, VA (rivalry)	ACCN	W 73–3	65,632	
September 5	9:40 p.m. (Note: Start time delayed from 7:30 p.m. due to thunderstorms.)	Clemson	No. 11 LSU	Tiger Stadium • Baton Rouge, LA (College GameDay)	ABC	L 10–51	102,321	
September 5	10:30 p.m.	UCLA	California	California Memorial Stadium • Berkeley, CA (rivalry)	ESPN	L 24–45	54,283	
September 6	7:30 p.m.	No. 24 Louisville	No. 9 Ole Miss	Nissan Stadium • Nashville, TN	ABC	L 38–41	57,390	
September 7	7:30 p.m.	No. 19 SMU	Florida State	Doak Campbell Stadium • Tallahassee, FL	ESPN	SMU 27–24	60,107	
^{#}Rankings from AP Poll. All times are in Eastern Time.

Date	Bye Week		
September 5	NC State	North Carolina	Virginia

==== Week Two ====
Date	Time	Visiting team	Home team	Site	TV	Result	Attendance	Ref.
September 10	8:00 p.m.	Florida A&M	No. 7 Miami (FL)	Hard Rock Stadium • Miami Gardens, FL	ACCN	W 77–7	63,618	
September 11	7:00 p.m.	No. 21 (FCS) Villanova	No. 24 Louisville	L&N Federal Credit Union Stadium • Louisville, KY	ACCN	W 59–13	46,385	
September 11	7:00 p.m.	Richmond	NC State	Carter–Finley Stadium • Raleigh, NC	ESPNU	W 73–0	56,919	
September 11	7:00 p.m.	Norfolk State	No. 25 Virginia	Scott Stadium • Charlottesville, VA	ACCNX	W 59–3	46,918	
September 11	7:30 p.m.	Rutgers	Boston College	Alumni Stadium • Chestnut Hill, MA	ESPN2	W 28–21	40,611	
September 12	Noon	Wake Forest	Purdue	Ross–Ade Stadium • West Lafayette, IN	FS1	W 38–36 ^{2OT}	50,363	
September 12	Noon	East Tennessee State	North Carolina	Kenan Stadium • Chapel Hill, NC	ACCN	W 35–3	42,362	
September 12	Noon	Old Dominion	Virginia Tech	Lane Stadium • Blacksburg, VA	The CW	W 44–21	65,632	
September 12	3:30 p.m.	Duke	Illinois	Gies Memorial Stadium • Champaign, IL	FS1	W 31–27	60,670	
September 12	3:30 p.m.	UCF	Pittsburgh	Acrisure Stadium • Pittsburgh, PA	ESPN2	W 12–7	45,926	
September 12	3:30 p.m.	California	Syracuse	JMA Wireless Dome • Syracuse, NY	ACCN	CAL 21–18	36,031	
September 12	4:00 p.m.	No. 7 (FCS) UC Davis	No. 17 SMU	Gerald J. Ford Stadium • Dallas, TX	ACCNX	W 56–10	29,054	
September 12	7:00 p.m.	No. 18 Tennessee	Georgia Tech	Bobby Dodd Stadium • Atlanta, GA (rivalry)	ESPN	L 24–45	52,113	
September 12	9:30 p.m. (Note: Start time delayed from 7:30 p.m. due to thunderstorms.)	Georgia Southern	Clemson	Memorial Stadium • Clemson, SC	ACCN	W 22–7	81,150	
^{#}Rankings from AP Poll. All times are in Eastern Time.

Date	Bye Week	
September 12	Florida State	Stanford

==== Week Three ====
Date	Time	Visiting team	Home team	Site	TV	Result	Attendance	Ref.
September 17	7:30 p.m.	Syracuse	Pittsburgh	Acrisure Stadium • Pittsburgh, PA (rivalry)	ESPN	PITT 27–13	42,087	
September 18	7:30 p.m.	No. 5 Miami (FL)	Wake Forest	Allegacy Federal Credit Union Stadium • Winston-Salem, NC	ESPN	MIA 33–20	32,147	
September 19	Noon	North Carolina	Clemson	Memorial Stadium • Clemson, SC	ESPN	CLEM 28–20	78,332	
September 19	Noon	Mercer	Georgia Tech	Bobby Dodd Stadium • Atlanta, GA	ACCN	W 44–11	50,852	
September 19	12:45 p.m.	NC State	Vanderbilt	FirstBank Stadium • Nashville, TN	SECN	L 31–35	35,000	
September 19	2:00 p.m.	Maine	Boston College	Alumni Stadium • Chestnut Hill, MA	ACCNX	W 22–16	35,605	
September 19	3:30 p.m.	No. 16 SMU	No. 23 Louisville	L&N Federal Credit Union Stadium • Louisville, KY	ESPN2	LOU 41–31	50,199	
September 19	3:30 p.m.	Florida State	No. 10 Alabama	Bryant–Denny Stadium • Tuscaloosa, AL	ABC	L 36–50	100,077	
September 19	3:30 p.m.	Wagner	California	California Memorial Stadium • Berkeley, CA	ACCN	W 49–7	35,586	
September 19	4:00 p.m.	Stanford	Duke	Wallace Wade Stadium • Durham, NC	The CW	DUKE 35–7	19,139	
September 19	7:30 p.m.	West Virginia	No. 25 Virginia	Bank of America Stadium • Charlotte, NC (Duke's Mayo Classic)	ACCN	L 27–38	39,377	
September 19	7:30 p.m.	Virginia Tech	Maryland	SECU Stadium • College Park, MD	FS1	W 35–26	46,185	
^{#}Rankings from AP Poll. All times are in Eastern Time.

==== Week Four ====
Date	Time	Visiting team	Home team	Site	TV	Result	Attendance	Ref.
September 25	10:30 p.m.	Clemson	California	California Memorial Stadium • Berkeley, CA	ESPN	CLEM 24–10	41,778	
September 26	Noon	Bucknell	Pittsburgh	Acrisure Stadium • Pittsburgh, PA	ACCNX	W 59–0	43,920	
September 26	Noon	Virginia Tech	Boston College	Alumni Stadium • Chestnut Hill, MA (rivalry)	ACCN	VT 21–14	22,624	
September 26	Noon	Wake Forest	No. 16 Louisville	L&N Federal Credit Union Stadium • Louisville, KY	ESPN	WF 30–27	46,042	
September 26	3:00 p.m.	Central Arkansas	Florida State	Doak Campbell Stadium • Tallahassee, FL	ACCN	W 34–7	67,277	
September 26	3:30 p.m.	William & Mary	Duke	Wallace Wade Stadium • Durham, NC	ACCNX	W 62–7	22,003	
September 26	6:00 p.m.	Delaware	Virginia	Scott Stadium • Charlottesville, VA	ACCN	W 42–3	41,935	
September 26	6:30 p.m.	Central Michigan	No. 6 Miami (FL)	Hard Rock Stadium • Miami Gardens, FL	The CW	W 52–3	65,338	
September 26	7:30 p.m.	Appalachian State	NC State	Carter–Finley Stadium • Raleigh, NC	ESPNU	W 41–31	56,919	
September 26	9:00 p.m.	Missouri State	No. 22 SMU	Gerald J. Ford Stadium • Dallas, TX	ACCN	W 34–24	31,987	
September 26	10:30 p.m.	Georgia Tech	Stanford	Stanford Stadium • Stanford, CA	ESPN	STAN 34–27	23,455	
^{#}Rankings from AP Poll. All times are in Eastern Time.

Date	Bye Week	
September 26	North Carolina	Syracuse

==== Week Five ====
Date	Time	Visiting team	Home team	Site	TV	Result	Attendance	Ref.
October 2	7:00 p.m.	Pittsburgh	Virginia Tech	Lane Stadium • Blacksburg, VA	ESPN	PITT 35–33	65,632	
October 3	Noon	No. 3 Notre Dame	North Carolina	Kenan Stadium • Chapel Hill, NC (rivalry)	ESPN	L 26–37	50,500	
October 3	Noon	Stanford	Wake Forest	Allegacy Federal Credit Union Stadium • Winston-Salem, NC	ACCN	WAKE 57–3	29,188	
October 3	Noon	Boston College	No. 21 SMU	Gerald J. Ford Stadium • Dallas, TX	The CW	SMU 25–16	27,942	
October 3	Noon	Syracuse	UConn	Pratt & Whitley Stadium • East Hartford, CT (rivalry)	CBSSN	W 42–41 ^{OT}	35,883	
October 3	3:30 p.m.	Virginia	Florida State	Doak Campbell Stadium • Tallahassee, FL (Jefferson–Eppes Trophy)	ESPN2	FSU 38–7	55,782	
October 3	3:30 p.m.	Louisville	NC State	Carter–Finley Stadium • Raleigh, NC	ACCN	NCSU 31–28	56,919	
October 3	3:30 p.m.	California	UNLV	Allegiant Stadium • Paradise, NV	CBSSN	L 31–39	30,632	
October 3	7:30 p.m.	No. 4 Miami (FL)	Clemson	Memorial Stadium • Clemson, SC	ABC	MIA 41–13	80,463	
^{#}Rankings from AP Poll. All times are in Eastern Time.

Date	Bye Week	
October 3	Duke	Georgia Tech

==== Week Six ====
Date	Time	Visiting team	Home team	Site	TV	Result	Attendance	Ref.
October 9	7:00 p.m.	Florida State	Louisville	L&N Federal Credit Union Stadium • Louisville, KY	ESPN	LOU 44–20	48,992	
October 10	Noon	North Carolina	No. 25 Pittsburgh	Acrisure Stadium • Pittsburgh, PA	ESPN	UNC 21–17	51,416	
October 10	Noon	Wake Forest	NC State	Carter–Finley Stadium • Raleigh, NC (rivalry)	The CW	WF 38–14	56,919	
October 10	3:30 p.m.	Stanford	No. 3 Notre Dame	Notre Dame Stadium • South Bend, IN (rivalry)	NBC	L 7–58	77,622	
October 10	3:30 p.m.	Duke	Georgia Tech	Bobby Dodd Stadium • Atlanta, GA (rivalry)	ESPN2	GT 28–25	46,432	
October 10	3:30 p.m.	Virginia Tech	California	California Memorial Stadium • Berkeley, CA	ACCN	CAL 25–20	40,170	
October 10	7:30 p.m.	Syracuse	Virginia	Scott Stadium • Charlottesville, VA	ACCN	UVA 28–25	39,661	
^{#}Rankings from AP Poll. All times are in Eastern Time.

Date	Bye Week			
October 10	Boston College	Clemson	No. 4 Miami (FL)	No. 24 SMU

==== Week Seven ====
Date	Time	Visiting team	Home team	Site	TV	Result	Attendance	Ref.
October 17	Noon	Pittsburgh	Boston College	Alumni Stadium • Chestnut Hill, MA	ESPN2	BC 27–21	32,847	
October 17	Noon	Virginia	No. 24 SMU	Gerald J. Ford Stadium • Dallas, TX	The CW	SMU 23–13	28,713	
October 17	Noon	Charleston Southern	Clemson	Memorial Stadium • Clemson, SC	ACCN	W 37–0	75,917	
October 17	3:30 p.m.	North Carolina	Duke	Wallace Wade Stadium • Durham, NC (Victory Bell)	ESPN2	UNC 24–20	35,018	
October 17	3:30 p.m.	Georgia Tech	Virginia Tech	Lane Stadium • Blacksburg, VA (Techmo Bowl)	ACCN	VT 34–24	65,632	
October 17	7:00 p.m.	Florida State	No. 3 Miami (FL)	Hard Rock Stadium • Miami Gardens, FL (rivalry)	ESPN	MIA 43–35 ^{2OT}	66,790	
October 17	7:30 p.m.	Louisville	Syracuse	JMA Wireless Dome • Syracuse, NY	ACCN	LOU 34–26	39,293	
October 17	7:30 p.m.	Elon	Stanford	Stanford Stadium • Stanford, CA	ACCNX	W 34–7	18,940	
October 17	10:30 p.m.	No. 21 Wake Forest	California	California Memorial Stadium • Berkeley, CA	ESPN2	WF 41–7	34,850	
^{#}Rankings from AP Poll. All times are in Eastern Time.

Date	Bye Week
October 17	NC State

==== Week Eight ====
Date	Time	Visiting team	Home team	Site	TV	Result	Attendance	Ref.
October 23	7:00 p.m.	Duke	Virginia	Scott Stadium • Charlottesville, VA (rivalry)	ESPN	DUKE 19–16	45,138	
October 23	10:30 p.m.	NC State	Stanford	Stanford Stadium • Stanford, CA	ESPN	STAN 31–28	13,949	
October 24	Noon	Pittsburgh	No. 1 Miami (FL)	Hard Rock Stadium • Miami Gardens, FL	ESPN	MIA 52–23	65,991	
October 24	Noon	California	No. 23 SMU	Gerald J. Ford Stadium • Dallas, TX	The CW	SMU 59–20	26,463	
October 24	3:30 p.m.	Boston College	Georgia Tech	Bobby Dodd Stadium • Atlanta, GA	ACCN	BC 49–27	47,239	
October 24	7:00 p.m.	Virginia Tech	Clemson	Memorial Stadium • Clemson, SC	ESPN	VT 20–16	80,510	
October 24	7:30 p.m.	Syracuse	North Carolina	Kenan Stadium • Chapel Hill, NC	ACCN	SYR 31–30 ^{OT}	50,500	
^{#}Rankings from AP Poll. All times are in Eastern Time.

Date	Bye Week		
October 24	Florida State	Louisville	No. 17 Wake Forest

==== Week Nine ====
Date	Time	Visiting team	Home team	Site	TV	Result	Attendance	Ref.
October 31	Noon	No. 19 SMU	Syracuse	JMA Wireless Dome • Syracuse, NY	ESPN2	SYR 30–27	33,396	
October 31	Noon	California	NC State	Carter–Finley Stadium • Raleigh, NC	ACCN	NCSU 31–10	52,933	
October 31	Noon	Boston College	Duke	Wallace Wade Stadium • Durham, NC	The CW	DUKE 47–2	15,653	
October 31	3:15 p.m.	Stanford	Louisville	L&N Federal Credit Union Stadium • Louisville, KY	ACCN	LOU 52–24	44,308	
October 31	3:45 p.m.	Virginia	No. 14 Wake Forest	Allegacy Federal Credit Union Stadium • Winston-Salem, NC	ESPN2	WF 51–7	30,218	
October 31	7:00 p.m.	Clemson	Florida State	Doak Campbell Stadium • Tallahassee, FL (rivalry)	ACCN	CLEM 36–24	60,472	
October 31	7:30 p.m.	No. 1 Miami (FL)	North Carolina	Kenan Stadium • Chapel Hill, NC	ABC	MIA 38–35	44,257	
October 31	7:30 p.m.	Georgia Tech	Pittsburgh	Acrisure Stadium • Pittsburgh, PA	ESPN2	PITT 34–11	42,904	
^{#}Rankings from AP Poll. All times are in Eastern Time.

Date	Bye Week
October 31	Virginia Tech

==== Week Ten ====
Date	Time	Visiting team	Home team	Site	TV	Result	Attendance	Ref.
November 6	7:00 p.m.	Virginia Tech	SMU	Gerald J. Ford Stadium • Dallas, TX	ESPN	SMU 51–28	32,566	
November 7	Noon	North Carolina	UConn	Pratt & Whitney Stadium • East Hartford, CT	CBSSN	W 38–21	36,901	
November 7	Noon	Clemson	Syracuse	JMA Wireless Dome • Syracuse, NY	ESPN2	CLEM 18–13	37,291	
November 7	Noon	Florida State	Boston College	Alumni Stadium • Chestnut Hill, MA	ACCN	FSU 31–24	37,155	
November 7	12:30 p.m.	Duke	NC State	Carter–Finley Stadium • Raleigh, NC (rivalry)	The CW	DUKE 41–3	56,919	
November 7	3:30 p.m.	Merrimack	No. 16 Wake Forest	Allegacy Federal Credit Union Stadium • Winston-Salem, NC	ACCN	W 77–0	28,098	
November 7	7:30 p.m.	No. 1 Miami (FL)	No. 11 Notre Dame	Notre Dame Stadium • South Bend, IN (rivalry)	NBC	L 24–31	77,622	
November 7	7:30 p.m.	Louisville	Georgia Tech	Bobby Dodd Stadium • Atlanta, GA	ACCN	LOU 44–17	44,680	
^{#}Rankings from College Football Playoff. All times are in Eastern Time.

Date	Bye Week			
November 7	California	Pittsburgh	Stanford	Virginia

==== Week Eleven ====
Date	Time	Visiting team	Home team	Site	TV	Result	Attendance	Ref.
November 13	7:00 p.m.	Florida State	Pittsburgh	Acrisure Stadium • Pittsburgh, PA	ESPN	FSU 16–10	45,734	
November 14	12:00 p.m.	Duke	No. 7 Miami (FL)	Hard Rock Stadium • Miami Gardens, FL	ABC	MIA 36–25	66,618	
November 14	12:00 p.m.	No. 13 Wake Forest	SMU	Gerald J. Ford Stadium • Dallas, TX	ESPN	WF 49–7	33,571	
November 14	12:00 p.m.	Syracuse	NC State	Carter–Finley Stadium • Raleigh, NC	ACCN	SYR 34–31	53,948	
November 14	12:30 p.m.	Georgia Tech	Clemson	Memorial Stadium • Clemson, SC (rivalry)	The CW	GT 20–6	76,701	
November 14	3:30 p.m.	California	Virginia	Scott Stadium • Charlottesville, VA	ACCN	UVA 36–7	39,423	
November 14	3:30 p.m.	Boston College	No. 5 Notre Dame	Notre Dame Stadium • South Bend, IN (Holy War)	NBC	L 7–41	77,622	
November 14	7:00 p.m.	Louisville	North Carolina	Kenan Stadium • Chapel Hill, NC	ESPN2	LOU 16–14	44,664	
November 14	7:30 p.m.	Stanford	Virginia Tech	Lane Stadium • Blacksburg, VA	ACCN	STAN 40–22	65,632	
^{#}Rankings from College Football Playoff. All times are in Eastern Time.

==== Week Twelve ====
Date	Time	Visiting team	Home team	Site	TV	Result	Attendance	Ref.
November 20	7:30 p.m.	Clemson	Duke	Wallace Wade Stadium • Durham, NC	ESPN	CLEM 20–10	25,311	
November 21	12:00 p.m.	No. 11 Wake Forest	Georgia Tech	Bobby Dodd Stadium • Atlanta, GA	ESPN	WF 50–29	45,296	
November 21	12:00 p.m.	Syracuse	Boston College	Alumni Stadium • Chestnut Hill, MA	ACCN	BC 27–15	35,109	
November 21	12:30 p.m.	North Carolina	Virginia	Scott Stadium • Charlottesville, VA (South's Oldest Rivalry)	The CW	UVA 41–24	39,112	
November 21	3:30 p.m.	NC State	Florida State	Doak Campbell Stadium • Tallahassee, FL	ACCN	NCSU 28–10	60,143	
November 21	7:00 p.m.	Virginia Tech	No. 7 Miami (FL)	Hard Rock Stadium • Miami Gardens, FL (rivalry)	ESPN	MIA 28–20	66,790	
November 21	7:30 p.m.	Pittsburgh	No. 23 Louisville	L&N Federal Credit Union Stadium • Louisville, KY	ESPN2	LOU 42–10	45,892	
November 21	7:30 p.m.	SMU	No. 6 Notre Dame	Notre Dame Stadium • South Bend, IN	NBC	L 3–24	77,622	
November 21	7:30 p.m.	Stanford	California	California Memorial Stadium • Berkeley, CA (Big Game)	ACCN	STAN 44–28	54,283	
^{#}Rankings from College Football Playoff. All times are in Eastern Time.

==== Week Thirteen ====
Date	Time	Visiting team	Home team	Site	TV	Result	Attendance	Ref.
November 27	3:30 p.m.	Florida	Florida State	Doak Campbell Stadium • Tallahassee, FL (Sunshine Showdown)	ABC	–		
November 28	12:00 p.m.	Notre Dame	Syracuse	JMA Wireless Dome • Syracuse, NY	ABC	–		
November 28	12:00 p.m.	Boston College	Miami (FL)	Hard Rock Stadium • Miami Gardens, FL	ESPN	–		
November 28	12:00 p.m.	NC State	North Carolina	Kenan Stadium • Chapel Hill, NC (rivalry)	ACCN	–		
November 28	12:00 p.m.	Louisville	Kentucky	Kroger Field • Lexington, KY (Governor's Cup)	ESPN2	–		
November 28	3:00 p.m.	South Carolina	Clemson	Memorial Stadium • Clemson, SC (Palmetto Bowl)	ESPN2	–		
November 28	3:30 p.m.	Duke	Wake Forest	Allegacy Federal Credit Union Stadium • Winston-Salem, NC (rivalry)	ESPN	–		
November 28	3:30 p.m.	SMU	Stanford	Stanford Stadium • Stanford, CA	ACCN	–		
November 28	3:00 p.m.	Virginia	Virginia Tech	Lane Stadium • Blacksburg, VA (Commonwealth Clash)	The CW	–		
November 28	7:30 p.m.	Pittsburgh	California	California Memorial Stadium • Berkeley, CA	ACCN	–		
November 28	3:30 p.m.	Georgia Tech	Georgia	Sanford Stadium • Athens, GA (Clean, Old-Fashioned Hate)	ABC	–		
^{#}Rankings from College Football Playoff. All times are in Eastern Time.

==== Championship Game ====
Date	Time	Visiting team	Home team	Site	TV	Result	Attendance	Ref.
December 5	Noon	Wake Forest	Miami (FL)	Bank of America Stadium • Charlotte, NC	ABC			
^{#}Rankings from College Football Playoff. All times are in Eastern Time.

== Head-to-head matchups ==
2026 ACC head-to-head matchups
Team	Boston College	California	Clemson	Duke	Florida State	Georgia Tech	Louisville	Miami	NC State	North Carolina	Pittsburgh	SMU	Stanford	Syracuse	Virginia	Virginia Tech	Wake Forest
vs. Boston College	—	×	×	47–2	31–24	27–49	×		×	×	21–27	25–16	×	15–27	×	21–14	×
vs. California	×	—	24–10	×	×	×	×	×	31–10	×		59–20	44–28	18–21	36–7	20–25	41–7
vs. Clemson	×	10–24	—	10–20	24–36	20–6	×	41–13	×	20–28	×	×	×	13–18	×	20–16	×
vs. Duke	2–47	×	20–10	—	×	28–25	×	36–25	3–41	24–20	×	×	7–35	×	16–19	×	
vs. Florida State	24–31	×	36–24	×	—	×	44–20	43–35	28–10	×	10–16	27–24	×	×	7–38	×	×
vs. Georgia Tech	49–27	×	6–20	25–28	×	—	44–17	×	×	×	34–11	×	34–27	×	×	34–24	50–29
vs. Louisville	×	×	×	×	20–44	17–44	—	×	31–28	14–16	10–42	31–41	24–52	26–34	×	×	30–27
vs. Miami		×	13–41	25–36	35–43	×	×	—	×	35–38	23–52	×	6–45	×	×	20–28	20–33
vs. NC State	×	10–31	×	41–3	10–28	×	28–31	×	—		×	×	31–28	34–31	34–8	×	38–14
vs. North Carolina	×	×	28–20	20–24	×	×	16–14	38–35		—	17–21	×	×	31–30	41–24	×	×
vs. Pittsburgh	27–21		×	×	16–10	11–34	42–10	52–23	×	21–17	—	×	×	13–27	×	33–35	×
vs. SMU	16–25	20–59	×	×	24–27	×	41–31	×	×	×	×	—		30–27	13–23	28–51	49–7
vs. Stanford	×	28–44	×	35–7	×	27–34	52–24	45–6	28–31	×	×		—	×	×	22–40	57–3
vs. Syracuse	27–15	21–18	18–13	×	×	×	34–26	×	31–34	30–31	27–13	27–30	×	—	28–25	×	×
vs. Virginia	×	7–36	×	19–16	38–7	×	×	×	8–34	24–41	×	23–13	×	25–28	—		51–7
vs. Virginia Tech	14–21	25–20	16–20	×	×	24–34	×	28–20	×	×	35–33	51–28	40–22	×		—	×
vs. Wake Forest	×	7–41	×		×	29–50	27–30	33–20	14–38	×	×	7–49	3–57	×	7–51	×	—
Total	3–4	2–6	5–3	4–4	3–5	2–6	7–2	8–0	3–5	2–5	3–5	5–3	4–4	3–6	4–4	3–5	7–1
	BC	CAL	CLEM	DUKE	FSU	GT	LOU	MIA	NCSU	UNC	PITT	SMU	STAN	SYR	UVA	VT	WF

× – Matchup not played in 2026
Updated after Week 12.

== ACC vs other conferences ==
=== ACC vs Power Four matchups ===
The following games include ACC teams competing against "Power Four" conference teams from the Big Ten, Big 12, and SEC, as well as Notre Dame. All rankings are from the AP Poll at the time of the game.

Date	Conference	Visitor	Home	Site	Score
August 29	Big 12	North Carolina	TCU†	Aviva Stadium • Dublin, Ireland	W 15–10
September 3	Big 12	Colorado	Georgia Tech	Bobby Dodd Stadium • Atlanta, GA	L 13–14
September 5	Big 12	Boston College	Cincinnati	Nippert Stadium • Cincinnati, OH	L 15–34
September 5	Big Ten	UCLA	California	California Memorial Stadium • Berkeley, CA	L 24–45
September 5	SEC	Clemson	11 LSU	Tiger Stadium • Baton Rouge, LA	L 10–51
September 6	SEC	24 Louisville	9 Ole Miss†	Nissan Stadium • Nashville, TN	L 38–41
September 11	Big Ten	Rutgers	Boston College	Alumni Stadium • Chestnut Hill, MA	W 28–21
September 12	SEC	18 Tennessee	Georgia Tech	Bobby Dodd Stadium • Atlanta, GA	L 24–45
September 12	Big 12	UCF	Pittsburgh	Acrisure Stadium • Pittsburgh, PA	W 12–7
September 12	Big Ten	Duke	Illinois	Gies Memorial Stadium • Champaign, IL	W 31–27
September 12	Big Ten	Wake Forest	Purdue	Ross–Ade Stadium • West Lafayette, IN	W 38–36^{2OT}
September 19	SEC	Florida State	10 Alabama	Bryant–Denny Stadium • Tuscaloosa, AL	L 36–50
September 19	SEC	NC State	Vanderbilt	FirstBank Stadium • Nashville, TN	L 31–35
September 19	Big 12	West Virginia	25 Virginia†	Bank of America Stadium • Charlotte, NC	L 27–38
September 19	Big Ten	Virginia Tech	Maryland	SECU Stadium • College Park, MD	W 35–26
October 3	—N/a	3 Notre Dame	North Carolina	Kenan Stadium • Chapel Hill, NC	L 26–37
October 10	—N/a	Stanford	3 Notre Dame	Notre Dame Stadium • South Bend, IN	L 7–58
November 7	—N/a	1 Miami (FL)	11 Notre Dame	Notre Dame Stadium • South Bend, IN	L 24–31
November 14	—N/a	Boston College	5 Notre Dame	Notre Dame Stadium • South Bend, IN	L 7–41
November 21	—N/a	SMU	6 Notre Dame	Notre Dame Stadium • South Bend, IN	L 3–24
November 27	SEC	Florida	Florida State	Doak Campbell Stadium • Tallahassee, FL	
November 28	SEC	Georgia Tech	Georgia	Sanford Stadium • Athens, GA	
November 28	SEC	Louisville	Kentucky	Kroger Field • Lexington, KY	
November 28	SEC	South Carolina	Clemson	Memorial Stadium • Clemson, SC	
November 28	—N/a	Notre Dame	Syracuse	JMA Wireless Dome • Syracuse, NY	

Note: † denotes neutral site game.

Updated after Week 12.

=== ACC vs Group of Six matchups ===
The following games include ACC teams competing against teams from the American, C-USA, MAC, Mountain West, and Sun Belt, as well as the Pac-12.

Date	Conference	Visitor	Home	Site	Score
August 29	Mountain West	Hawaii	Stanford	Stanford Stadium • Stanford, CA	W 37–27
August 29	C-USA	New Mexico State	Florida State	Doak Campbell Stadium • Tallahassee, FL	W 34–17
September 3	MAC	Akron	Wake Forest	Allegacy Federal Credit Union Stadium • Winston-Salem, NC	W 38–16
September 5	MAC	Miami (OH)	Pittsburgh	Acrisure Stadium • Pittsburgh, PA	W 59–14
September 5	American	Tulane	Duke	Wallace Wade Stadium • Durham, NC	W 17–3
September 12	Sun Belt	Georgia Southern	Clemson	Memorial Stadium • Clemson, SC	W 22–7
September 12	Sun Belt	Old Dominion	Virginia Tech	Lane Stadium • Blacksburg, VA	W 44–21
September 26	MAC	Central Michigan	6 Miami (FL)	Hard Rock Stadium • Miami Gardens, FL	W 52–3
September 26	C-USA	Delaware	Virginia	Scott Stadium • Charlottesville, VA	W 42–3
September 26	C-USA	Missouri State	22 SMU	Gerald J. Ford Stadium • Dallas, TX	W 34–24
September 26	Sun Belt	Appalachian State	NC State	Carter–Finley Stadium • Raleigh, NC	W 41–31
October 3	Mountain West	California	UNLV	Allegiant Stadium • Las Vegas, NV	L 31–39

Updated after Week 5.

=== ACC vs FBS independents matchups ===
The following games include ACC teams competing against FBS independent UConn (but excluding independent Notre Dame, which appears in the Power Four section above).

Date	Visitor	Home	Site	Score
October 3	Syracuse	UConn	Pratt & Whitley Stadium • East Hartford, CT	W 42–41^{OT}
November 7	North Carolina	UConn	Pratt & Whitley Stadium • East Hartford, CT	W 38–21

Updated after Week 10.

=== ACC vs FCS matchups ===
The Football Championship Subdivision comprises 13 conferences and two independent programs.

Date	Visitor	Home	Site	Score
September 5	New Hampshire	Syracuse	JMA Wireless Dome • Syracuse, NY	W 66–3
September 5	VMI	Virginia Tech	Lane Stadium • Blacksburg, VA	W 73–3
September 10	Florida A&M	7 Miami (FL)	Hard Rock Stadium • Miami Gardens, FL	W 77–7
September 11	Villanova	24 Louisville	L&N Federal Credit Union Stadium • Louisville, KY	W 59–13
September 11	Norfolk State	25 Virginia	Scott Stadium • Charlottesville, VA	W 59–3
September 11	Richmond	NC State	Carter–Finley Stadium • Raleigh, NC	W 73–0
September 12	East Tennessee State	North Carolina	Kenan Stadium • Chapel Hill, NC	W 35–3
September 12	UC Davis	17 SMU	Gerald J. Ford Stadium • Dallas, TX	W 56–10
September 19	Maine	Boston College	Alumni Stadium • Chestnut Hill, MA	W 22–16
September 19	Mercer	Georgia Tech	Bobby Dodd Stadium • Atlanta, GA	W 44–11
September 19	Wagner	California	California Memorial Stadium • Berkeley, CA	W 49–7
September 26	Bucknell	Pittsburgh	Acrisure Stadium • Pittsburgh, PA	W 59–0
September 26	Central Arkansas	Florida State	Doak Campbell Stadium • Tallahassee, FL	W 34–7
September 26	William & Mary	Duke	Wallace Wade Stadium • Durham, NC	W 62–7
October 17	Charleston Southern	Clemson	Memorial Stadium • Clemson, SC	W 37–0
October 17	Elon	Stanford	Stanford Stadium • Stanford, CA	W 34–7
November 7	Merrimack	16 Wake Forest	Allegacy Federal Credit Union Stadium • Winston-Salem, NC	W 77–0

Updated after Week 10.

=== Records against other conferences ===
Regular season

Power 4 Conferences	Record
Big Ten	4–1
Big 12	2–3
Notre Dame	0–5
SEC	0–5
Power 4 total	6–14
Other FBS conferences	Record
American	1–0
C-USA	3–0
Independents (Excluding Notre Dame)	2–0
MAC	3–0
Mountain West	1–1
Pac-12	0–0
Sun Belt	3–0
Other FBS total	13–1
FCS opponents	Record
Football Championship Subdivision	17–0
Total non-conference record	36–15

Post season

Power 4 Conferences	Record
Big Ten	0–0
Big 12	0–0
Notre Dame	0–0
SEC	0–0
Power 4 total	0–0
Other FBS conferences	Record
American	0–0
C-USA	0–0
Independents (Excluding Notre Dame)	0–0
MAC	0–0
Mountain West	0–0
Pac-12	0–0
Sun Belt	0–0
Other FBS total	0–0
Total bowl record	0–0

== Postseason ==
=== Bowl games ===
Legend
ACC win
ACC loss
Cancellation

Bowl game	Date	Site	Time (EST)	Television	ACC team	Opponent	Score	Attendance

== Awards and honors ==
=== Player of the week honors ===
Week	Quarterback		Receiver		Running Back		Offensive Line		Defensive Line		Linebacker		Defensive Back		Specialist			Rookie		
Week	Player	Team	Player	Team	Player	Team	Player	Team	Player	Team	Player	Team	Player	Team	Player	Team	Position	Player	Team	Position
Week 0	Beau Pribula	Virginia	Samuel Singleton Jr.	Florida State	Micah Ford	Stanford	Monroe Mills	Virginia	Xavier Lewis	North Carolina	Derek McDonald	North Carolina	Brandyn Hillman	Virginia	Will Bettridge	Virginia	K	Atticus Joseph	Stanford	WR
Week 1	Mason Heintschel	Pittsburgh	Malachi Toney	Miami	Nate Sheppard	Duke	P. J. Williams	SMU	Bryce Davis	Duke	Vincent Firenze	Wake Forest	Jimmy Wyrick	SMU	Rahkeem Smith	Georgia Tech	WR	Shavane Anderson Jr.	Syracuse	RB
Week 2	Gio Lopez	Wake Forest	Luke Reynolds	Virginia Tech	Nate Sheppard (2)	Duke	Nick Del Grande	Duke	Mylachi Williams	Virginia Tech	Anthony Palano	Boston College	Kingston Lopa	California	Nolan Hauser	Clemson	K	Javian Mallory	Miami	RB
Week 3	Darian Mensah	Miami	Keenan Jackson	NC State	Keyjuan Brown	Louisville	Eryx Daugherty	Louisville	Will Heldt; Kevin O'Connor	Clemson; Duke	Alex Sanford Jr.	Pittsburgh	Kaleb Beasley	Louisville	Nolan Hauser (2)	Clemson	K	Damon Ferguson Jr.	Pittsburgh	RB
Week 4	Davis Warren	Stanford	Carlos Hernandez	Wake Forest	Jeffrey Overton Jr.	Virginia Tech	Teague Andersen	NC State	Gabe Kirschke	Wake Forest	Matt Rose	Stanford	Elliot Washington II	Clemson	Bryant Wesco	Clemson	WR/PR	Demetrice McCray	Pittsburgh	WR
Week 5	Ashton Daniels	Florida State	Umari Hatcher	Syracuse	Tylik Hill	Syracuse	Andre Otto	Florida State	Marques White	SMU	Popo Aguirre	NC State	Jarvis Lee	SMU	Jaden Jefferson	North Carolina	WR/RS	Taimane Purcell	California	TE
Week 6	Gio Lopez (2)	Wake Forest	Jack Foley	Wake Forest	Isaac Brown	Louisville	Lance Robinson	Louisville	Xavier Lewis (2)	North Carolina	Vincent Firenze (2)	Wake Forest	Tre Miller	North Carolina	Daniel Sparks	Virginia	P	Braylon Outlaw	Georgia Tech	LB
Week 7	Ashton Daniels (2); Gio Lopez (3)	Florida State; Wake Forest	Umari Hatcher (2)	Syracuse	Micah Ford (2)	Stanford	Clinton Richard	Wake Forest	Tyler Thompson	Louisville	Peyton Seelmann	North Carolina	Carter Davis	Boston College	Nolan Hauser (3)	Clemson	K	Dominick Barry; Javian Mallory (2)	Wake Forest; Miami	TE; RB
Week 8	Darian Mensah (2)	Miami	Malachi Toney (2)	Miami	Bo MacCormack III	Boston College	Veguer Jean-Jumeau	Boston College	Will Heldt (2)	Clemson	Derek McDonald (2)	North Carolina	Charlie Comella	Boston College	Nolan Hauser (4)	Clemson	K	Calvin Russell III	Syracuse	WR
Week 9	Billy Edwards Jr.	North Carolina	Tre Richardson	Louisville	Nate Sheppard (3)	Duke	Johnnie Brown III; Will Way	Louisville; Wake Forest	Marquise Lightfoot	Miami	Popo Aguirre	NC State	Jerome Carter III	Clemson	Nolan Hauser (5)	Clemson	K	Damon Ferguson Jr. (2)	Pittsburgh	RB
Week 10																				
Week 11																				
Week 12																				
Week 13																				
Week 14																				

=== All-conference teams ===
First team

Position	Player	Team
First team offense
QB		
RB		
WR		
TE		
All Purpose Back		
T		
G		
C		
First team defense
DE		
DT		
LB		
CB		
S		
First team special teams
PK		
P		
SP		

Second team

Position	Player	Team
Second team offense
QB		
RB		
WR		
TE		
All Purpose Back		
T		
G		
C		
Second team defense
DE		
DT		
LB		
CB		
S		
Second team special teams
PK		
P		
SP		

Third team

Position	Player	Team
Third team offense
QB		
RB		
WR		
TE		
All Purpose Back		
T		
G		
C		
Third team defense
DE		
DT		
LB		
CB		
S		
Third team special teams
PK		
P		
SP		

=== ACC individual awards ===
ACC Player of the Year

ACC Rookie of the Year

ACC Coach of the Year

ACC Offensive Player of the Year

ACC Offensive Rookie of the Year

Jacobs Blocking Trophy

ACC Defensive Player of the Year

ACC Defensive Rookie of the Year

=== All-Americans ===
==== Consensus All-Americans ====
The NCAA compiles consensus all-America teams in the sports of Division I FBS football and Division I men's basketball using a point system computed from All-America teams named by coaches associations or media sources. Players are chosen against other players playing at their position only. To be selected a consensus All-American, players must be chosen to the first team on at least half of the five official selectors as recognized by the NCAA. Second- and third-team honors are used to break ties. Players named first-team by all five selectors are deemed unanimous All-Americans. The NCAA recognizes All-Americans selected by the AP, AFCA, FWAA, TSN, and the WCFF to determine consensus and unanimous All-Americans.

2025 Consensus All-Americans
Unanimous	Consensus

==== Associated Press ====
2026 AP All-Americans
First Team	Second Team	Third Team

==== AFCA ====
2026 AFCA All-Americans
First Team	Second Team

==== FWAA ====
2026 FWAA All-Americans
First Team	Second Team

==== The Sporting News ====
2026 Sporting News All-Americans
First Team	Second Team

==== WCFF ====
2026 Walter Camp All-Americans
First Team	Second Team

== Television selections ==
The Atlantic Coast Conference has television contracts with ESPN, which allow games to be broadcast across ABC, FOX, NBC, CBS, TNT, ESPN2, ESPNU, and ACC Network. Streaming broadcasts for games under ACC control are streamed on ESPN+. Games under the control of other conferences fall under the contracts of the opposing conference.

Network	Wk 0	Wk 1	Wk 2	Wk 3	Wk 4	Wk 5	Wk 6	Wk 7	Wk 8	Wk 9	Wk 10	Wk 11	Wk 12	Wk 13	Wk 14	C	Bowls	NCG	Totals
ABC	—	2	–	1	–	1	–	–	–	1	–	1	–	3	—	1		-	10
ESPN	2	4	1	3	3	2	2	1	4	–	1	2	3	2	–	–		–	
ESPN2	–	–	2	1	–	1	1	3	–	3	1	1	1	2	–	–	–	–	
ESPNU	–	–	1	–	1	–	–	–	–	–	–	–	–	–	–	–	–	–	2
FOX	–	1	–	–	–	–	–	–	–	–	–	–	–	–	–	–	–	–	1
FS1	–	–	2	1	–	–	–	–	–	–	–	–	–	–	–	–	–	–	3
SEC Network	–	–	–	–	–	–	–	–	–	–	–	–	–	–	–	–	–	–	–
CBS	–	–	–	–	–	–	–	–	–	–	–	–	–	–	–	–	–	–	–
NBC	–	–	–	–	–	–	1	–	–	–	1	1	1	–	–	–	–	–	4
The CW	1	1	1	1	1	1	1	1	1	1	1	1	1	1	–	–	–	–	14
CBS Sports Network	–	–	–	–	–	2	–	–	–	–	1	–	–	–	–	–	–	–	3
ACC Network	1	4	5	3	4	2	2	3	2	3	3	3	3	3	–	–	–	–	
TNT (TruTV, TBS)	–	–	–	–	–	–	–	–	–	–	–	–	–	–	–	–	–	–	–
ESPN+ (streaming)	–	–	2	1	2	–	–	1	–	–	–				–	–	–	–	-
TNT Max (streaming)	–	–	–	–	–	–	–	–	–	–	–	–	–	–	–	–	–	–	–

Platform	Games
Broadcast	0
Cable	0
Streaming	0

== Home game attendance ==
Team	Stadium	Capacity	Game 1	Game 2	Game 3	Game 4	Game 5	Game 6	Game 7	Total	Average	% of capacity
Boston College	Alumni Stadium	44,500	40,611	35,605	22,624	32,847	37,155	35,109	—N/a	203,951	33,992	76.39%
California	California Memorial Stadium	63,000	54,283	35,586	41,778	40,170	34,850	54,283		260,950	43,492	69.03%
Clemson	Memorial Stadium	81,500	81,150	78,332	80,463	75,917	80,510	76,701		473,073	78,846	96.74%
Duke	Wallace Wade Stadium	35,018	16,113	19,139	22,003	35,018	15,653	25,311	—N/a	133,237	22,206	63.41%
Florida State	Doak Campbell Stadium	79,560	65,915	60,107	67,277	55,782	60,472	60,143		369,696	61,616	77.45%
Georgia Tech	Bobby Dodd Stadium	55,000	52,113	52,113	50,852	46,432	47,239	44,680	45,296	338,725	48,389	87.98%
Louisville	L&N Federal Credit Union Stadium	60,800	46,385	50,199	46,042	48,992	44,308	45,892	—N/a	281,818	46,970	77.25%
Miami (FL)	Hard Rock Stadium	65,326	63,618	65,338	66,790	65,991	66,618	66,790		395,145	65,858	100.81%
North Carolina	Kenan Memorial Stadium	50,500	42,362	50,500	50,500	44,257	44,664		—N/a	232,283	46,457	91.99%
NC State	Carter–Finley Stadium	56,919	56,919	56,919	56,919	56,919	52,933	56,919	53,948	391,476	55,925	98.25%
Pittsburgh	Acrisure Stadium	68,400	43,929	45,926	42,087	43,920	51,416	42,904	45,734	315,916	45,131	65.98%
SMU	Gerald J. Ford Stadium	32,000	29,054	31,987	27,942	28,713	26,463	32,566	33,571	210,296	30,042	93.88%
Stanford	Stanford Stadium	50,424	23,222	37,648	23,455	18,940	13,949		—N/a	117,214	23,443	46.49%
Syracuse	JMA Wireless Dome	49,057	33,257	36,031	39,293	33,396	37,291		—N/a	179,268	35,854	73.09%
Virginia	Scott Stadium	61,500	62,779	46,918	41,935	39,661	45,138	39,423	39,112	314,966	44,995	73.16%
Virginia Tech	Lane Stadium	65,632	65,632	65,632	65,632	65,632	65,632		—N/a	328,160	65,632	100%
Wake Forest	Allegacy Federal Credit Union Stadium	31,500	30,735	32,147	29,188	30,218	28,098		—N/a	150,386	30,077	95.48%

== NFL draft ==
The 2027 NFL draft will be held in Washington, D.C. The following list includes all ACC players in the draft.

=== List of selections ===
Player	Position	School	Draft Round	Round Pick	Overall Pick	Team

=== Total picks by school ===
Team	Round 1	Round 2	Round 3	Round 4	Round 5	Round 6	Round 7	Total
Boston College								
California								
Clemson								
Duke								
Florida State								
Georgia Tech								
Louisville								
Miami (FL)								
North Carolina								
NC State								
Pittsburgh								
SMU								
Stanford								
Syracuse								
Virginia								
Virginia Tech								
Wake Forest								
Total								
