= 2026 Duke Blue Devils football team =

American college football season

2026 Duke Blue Devils football
- Conference: Atlantic Coast Conference

Ranking
- Coaches: No. 24
- Record: 7–4 (4–4 ACC)
- Head coach: Manny Diaz (3rd season)
- Offensive coordinator: Jonathan Brewer (3rd season)
- Defensive coordinator: Jonathan Patke (3rd season)
- Home stadium: Wallace Wade Stadium

2026 Atlantic Coast Conference football standings
	Conf.			Overall
Team	W		L	W		L
No. 7 Miami (FL) y	8	–	0	10	–	1
No. 11 Wake Forest y	7	–	1	10	–	1
No. 23 Louisville	7	–	2	8	–	3
Clemson	5	–	3	7	–	4
SMU	5	–	3	7	–	4
Duke	4	–	4	7	–	4
Stanford	4	–	4	6	–	5
Virginia	4	–	4	6	–	5
Boston College	3	–	4	5	–	6
Pittsburgh	3	–	5	6	–	5
Virginia Tech	3	–	5	6	–	5
NC State	3	–	5	5	–	6
Florida State	3	–	5	5	–	6
Syracuse	3	–	6	5	–	6
North Carolina	2	–	5	5	–	6
California	2	–	6	3	–	8
Georgia Tech	2	–	6	3	–	8
Championship: Miami (FL) vs. Wake Forest
^ – College Football Playoff participant; $ – Conference champion; y – Championship game participant; As of November 22, 2026; Rankings from CFP rankings

The 2026 Duke Blue Devils football team is representing Duke University during the 2026 NCAA Division I FBS football season as they are a member of the Atlantic Coast Conference (ACC). The Blue Devils are led by their head coach Manny Diaz, who is coaching his third year as the Blue Devils head coach, and play their home games at Wallace Wade Stadium located in Durham, North Carolina.

== Schedule ==
Date	Time	Opponent	Site	TV	Result	Attendance
September 5	3:30 p.m.	Tulane*	Wallace Wade Stadium; Durham, NC	ACCN	W 17–3	16,113
September 12	3:30 p.m.	at Illinois*	Gies Memorial Stadium; Champaign, IL	FS1	W 31–27	60,670
September 19	4:00 p.m.	Stanford^{†}	Wallace Wade Stadium; Durham, NC	The CW	W 35–7	19,139
September 26	3:30 p.m.	William & Mary*	Wallace Wade Stadium; Durham, NC	ACCNX	W 62–7	22,003
October 10	3:30 p.m.	at Georgia Tech	Bobby Dodd Stadium; Atlanta, GA (rivalry)	ESPN2	L 25–28	46,432
October 17	3:30 p.m.	North Carolina	Wallace Wade Stadium; Durham, NC (Victory Bell)	ESPN2	L 20–24	35,018
October 23	7:00 p.m.	at Virginia	Scott Stadium; Charlottesville, VA (rivalry)	ESPN	W 19–16	45,138
October 31	12:00 p.m.	Boston College	Wallace Wade Stadium; Durham, NC	The CW	W 47–2	15,653
November 7	12:30 p.m.	at NC State	Carter–Finley Stadium; Raleigh, NC (rivalry)	The CW	W 41–3	56,919
November 14	12:00 p.m.	at No. 7 Miami (FL)	Hard Rock Stadium; Miami Gardens, FL	ABC	L 25–36	66,618
November 20	7:30 p.m.	Clemson	Wallace Wade Stadium; Durham, NC	ESPN	L 10–20	25,311
November 28	3:30 p.m.	at Wake Forest	Allegacy Federal Credit Union Stadium; Winston-Salem, NC (rivalry, College GameDay)	ESPN		
*Non-conference game; ^{†}Homecoming; Rankings from AP Poll (and CFP Rankings, after November 3) – Released prior to game; All times are in Eastern time; Source:

== Rankings ==
Ranking movements Legend: ██ Increase in ranking ██ Decrease in ranking — = Not ranked RV = Received votes
	Week															
Poll	Pre	1	2	3	4	5	6	7	8	9	10	11	12	13	14	Final
AP	—	—	—	RV	RV	RV	RV	—	—	RV	RV	RV				
Coaches	RV	RV	RV	RV	21	23	RV	RV	RV	RV	RV	24				
CFP	Not released									—	—	—				Not released

== Game summaries ==
=== vs Tulane ===
Tulane Green Wave (0–0) at Duke Blue Devils (0–0) – Game summary

Quarter	1	2	3	4	Total
Green Wave	0	0	0	3	3
Blue Devils	7	3	0	7	17

at Wallace Wade Stadium • Durham, North Carolina

- Date: September 5
- Game time: 3:30 p.m. EDT
- Game weather: Sunny • Temperature: 93 °F (34 °C)
- Game attendance: 16,113
- Referee: Charles Lamertina
- TV announcers (ACCN): Jorge Sedano, Rodney McLeod and Ashley Stroehlein

Game information

First quarter

- DUKE – Nate Sheppard 9-yard run (Cosme Salas kick), 5:07. Blue Devils 7–0. Drive: 17 plays, 75 yards, 9:53.

Second quarter

- DUKE – Cosme Salas 22-yard field goal, 0:00. Blue Devils 10–0. Drive: 9 plays, 43 yards, 1:45.

Third quarter

- No scoring plays.

Fourth quarter

- TULN – Jackson Courville 37-yard field goal, 13:37. Blue Devils 10–3. Drive: 7 plays, 39 yards, 2:35.
- DUKE – Nate Sheppard 14-yard run (Cosme Salas kick), 6:44. Blue Devils 17–3. Drive: 12 plays, 75 yards, 6:53.

Statistics	TULN	DUKE
First downs	10	20
Plays–yards	56–258	77–381
Rushes–yards	26–54	49–250
Passing yards	204	131
Passing: comp–att–int	17–30–0	13–28–0
Turnovers	1	1
Time of possession	23:25	36:35

Team	Category	Player	Statistics
Tulane	Passing	Kadin Semonza	11/21, 140 yards
Tulane	Rushing	Johnnie Daniels	8 carries, 31 yards
Tulane	Receiving	Destyn Hill	5 receptions, 67 yards
Duke	Passing	Walker Eget	13/26, 131 yards
Duke	Rushing	Nate Sheppard	35 carries, 227 yards, 2 TD
Duke	Receiving	Jonah Burton	3 receptions, 38 yards

=== at Illinois ===
Duke Blue Devils (1–0) at Illinois Fighting Illini (1–0) – Game summary

Quarter	1	2	3	4	Total
Blue Devils	7	14	7	3	31
Fighting Illini	10	14	3	0	27

at Gies Memorial Stadium • Champaign, Illinois

- Date: September 12
- Game time: 3:30 p.m. EDT
- Game weather: Sunny • Temperature: 86 °F (30 °C) • Wind: W at 7 miles per hour (11 km/h)
- Game attendance: 60,670
- Referee: Tim Hedgepeth
- TV announcers (FS1): Jack Kizer and Mark Helfrich

Game information

First quarter

- ILL – Collin Dixon 13-yard pass from Katin Houser (Ethan Moczulski kick), 10:23. Fighting Illini 7–0. Drive: 8 plays, 75 yards, 4:37.
- DUKE – Jonah Burton 12-yard pass from Walker Eget (Cosme Salas kick), 8:28. Tied 7–7. Drive: 4 plays, 75 yards, 1:55.
- ILL – Ethan Moczulski 51-yard field goal, 3:41. Fighting Illini 10–7. Drive: 11 plays, 43 yards, 4:47.

Second quarter

- ILL – Collin Dixon 40-yard pass from Katin Houser (Ethan Moczulski kick), 12:47. Fighting Illini 17–7. Drive: 8 plays, 62 yards, 3:49.
- DUKE – Nate Sheppard 2-yard run (Cosme Salas kick), 7:05. Fighting Illini 17–14. Drive: 12 plays, 75 yards, 5:42.
- ILL – Collin Dixon 2-yard pass from Katin Houser (Ethan Moczulski kick), 1:48. Fighting Illini 24–14. Drive: 11 plays, 75 yards, 5:17.
- DUKE – Nate Sheppard 7-yard pass from Walker Eget (Cosme Salas kick), 0:38. Fighting Illini 24–21. Drive: 8 plays, 75 yards, 1:10.

Third quarter

- DUKE – Nate Sheppard 3-yard pass from Walker Eget (Cosme Salas kick), 10:47. Blue Devils 28–24. Drive: 9 plays, 75 yards, 4:13.
- ILL – Ethan Moczulski 47-yard field goal, 5:08. Blue Devils 28–27. Drive: 11 plays, 46 yards, 5:39.

Fourth quarter

- DUKE – Cosme Salas 39-yard field goal, 13:53. Blue Devils 31–27. Drive: 10 plays, 53 yards, 6:15.

Statistics	DUKE	ILL
First downs	19	23
Plays–yards	57–376	68–382
Rushes–yards	35–170	32–111
Passing yards	206	271
Passing: comp–att–int	15–22–0	24–36–1
Turnovers	0	1
Time of possession	26:46	33:14

Team	Category	Player	Statistics
Duke	Passing	Walker Eget	15/21, 206 yards, 3 TD
Duke	Rushing	Nate Sheppard	24 carries, 147 yards, TD
Duke	Receiving	Jonah Burton	4 receptions, 78 yards, TD
Illinois	Passing	Katin Houser	24/35, 271 yards, 3 TD, INT
Illinois	Rushing	Ca'Lil Valentine	18 carries, 56 yards
Illinois	Receiving	Collin Dixon	11 receptions, 166 yards, 3 TD

=== vs Stanford ===
Stanford Cardinal (1–1) at Duke Blue Devils (2–0) – Game summary

Quarter	1	2	3	4	Total
Cardinal	0	7	0	0	7
Blue Devils	0	14	14	7	35

at Wallace Wade Stadium • Durham, North Carolina

- Date: September 19
- Game time: 4:00 p.m. EDT
- Game weather: Sunny • Temperature: 85 °F (29 °C) • Wind: W at 7 miles per hour (11 km/h)
- Game attendance: 19,139
- Referee: Jerry Magallanes
- TV announcers (The CW): Rick Allen, Jason Cabinda and Wes Bryant

Statistics	STAN	DUKE
First downs	15	22
Plays–yards	58–237	71–470
Rushes–yards	22–73	47–268
Passing yards	164	202
Passing: comp–att–int	20–36–0	14–24–1
Turnovers	1	1
Time of possession	22:46	37:14

Team	Category	Player	Statistics
Stanford	Passing	Davis Warren	18/32, 151 yards, TD
Stanford	Rushing	Micah Ford	11 carries, 76 yards
Stanford	Receiving	Caden High	5 receptions, 43 yards, TD
Duke	Passing	Walker Eget	14/24, 202 yards, TD, INT
Duke	Rushing	Nate Sheppard	23 carries, 154 yards, 2 TD
Duke	Receiving	Jeremiah Hasley	5 receptions, 88 yards

=== vs William & Mary (FCS) ===
William & Mary Tribe (FCS) (2–2) at Duke Blue Devils (3–0) – Game summary

Quarter	1	2	3	4	Total
Tribe (FCS)	7	0	0	0	7
Blue Devils	14	24	10	14	62

at Wallace Wade Stadium • Durham, North Carolina

- Date: September 26
- Game time: 3:30 p.m. EDT
- Game weather: Sunny • Temperature: 79 °F (26 °C)
- Game attendance: 22,003
- Referee: Darryl DeBerry
- TV announcers (ACCNX): Kevin Fitzgerald and Jeff Woody

Statistics	W&M	DUKE
First downs		
Plays–yards		
Rushes–yards		
Passing yards		
Passing: comp–att–int		
Time of possession		

Team	Category	Player	Statistics
William & Mary	Passing		
William & Mary	Rushing		
William & Mary	Receiving		
Duke	Passing		
Duke	Rushing		
Duke	Receiving		

=== at Georgia Tech ===
Duke Blue Devils (4–0) at Georgia Tech Yellow Jackets (1–3) – Game summary

Quarter	1	2	3	4	Total
Blue Devils	0	10	8	7	25
Yellow Jackets	7	7	7	7	28

at Bobby Dodd Stadium • Atlanta, Georgia

- Date: October 10
- Game time: 3:30 p.m. EDT

Statistics	DUKE	GT
First downs		
Plays–yards		
Rushes–yards		
Passing yards		
Passing: comp–att–int		
Time of possession		

Team	Category	Player	Statistics
Duke	Passing		
Duke	Rushing		
Duke	Receiving		
Georgia Tech	Passing		
Georgia Tech	Rushing		
Georgia Tech	Receiving		

=== vs North Carolina (Victory Bell) ===
North Carolina Tar Heels (3–2) at Duke Blue Devils (4–1) – Game summary

Quarter	1	2	3	4	Total
Tar Heels	10	7	0	7	24
Blue Devils	0	7	3	10	20

at Wallace Wade Stadium • Durham, North Carolina

- Date: October 17
- Game time: 3:30 p.m. EDT
- Game weather: Cloudy • Temperature: 56 °F (13 °C)
- Game attendance: 35,018
- Referee: Garrett Dickerson
- TV announcers (ESPN2): Lowell Galindo (play-by-play), Kirk Morrison (analyst) and Dawn Davenport (sideline)

Statistics	UNC	DUKE
First downs	22	19
Plays–yards	64–326	71–373
Rushes–yards	39–135	30–124
Passing yards	191	249
Passing: comp–att–int	15–25–0	24–41–1
Turnovers	2	1
Time of possession	28:37	31:23

Team	Category	Player	Statistics
North Carolina	Passing	Billy Edwards Jr.	15/25, 191 yards, TD
North Carolina	Rushing	Jaylen McGill	12 carries, 75 yards, TD
North Carolina	Receiving	Jordan Shipp	7 receptions, 75 yards, TD
Duke	Passing	Walker Eget	24/38, 249 yards, TD, INT
Duke	Rushing	Nate Sheppard	20 carries, 77 yards
Duke	Receiving	Nate Sheppard	11 receptions, 98 yards, TD

=== at Virginia (rivalry) ===
Duke Blue Devils (4–2) at Virginia Cavaliers (4–3) – Game summary

Quarter	1	2	3	4	Total
Blue Devils	7	0	3	9	19
Cavaliers	7	6	0	3	16

at Scott Stadium • Charlottesville, Virginia

- Date: October 23
- Game time: 7:00 p.m. EDT
- TV announcers (ESPN): Mike Monaco play by play, Jordan Rodgers analyst, & Dana Boyle reporter

Statistics	DUKE	UVA
First downs		
Plays–yards		
Rushes–yards		
Passing yards		
Passing: comp–att–int		
Time of possession		

Team	Category	Player	Statistics
Duke	Passing		
Duke	Rushing		
Duke	Receiving		
Virginia	Passing		
Virginia	Rushing		
Virginia	Receiving		

=== vs Boston College ===
Boston College Eagles (4–3) at Duke Blue Devils (5–2) – Game summary

Quarter	1	2	3	4	Total
Eagles	2	0	0	0	2
Blue Devils	13	14	14	6	47

at Wallace Wade Stadium • Durham, North Carolina

- Date: October 31
- Game time: 12:00 p.m. EDT

Statistics	BC	DUKE
First downs		
Plays–yards		
Rushes–yards		
Passing yards		
Passing: comp–att–int		
Time of possession		

Team	Category	Player	Statistics
Boston College	Passing		
Boston College	Rushing		
Boston College	Receiving		
Duke	Passing		
Duke	Rushing		
Duke	Receiving		

=== at NC State ===
Duke Blue Devils (6–2) at NC State Wolfpack (4–4) – Game summary

Quarter	1	2	3	4	Total
Blue Devils	7	24	7	3	41
Wolfpack	3	0	0	0	3

at Carter–Finley Stadium • Raleigh, North Carolina

- Date: November 7
- Game time: 12:30 p.m. EST

Statistics	DUKE	NCSU
First downs		
Plays–yards		
Rushes–yards		
Passing yards		
Passing: comp–att–int		
Time of possession		

Team	Category	Player	Statistics
Duke	Passing		
Duke	Rushing		
Duke	Receiving		
NC State	Passing		
NC State	Rushing		
NC State	Receiving		

=== at No. 7 Miami (FL) ===
Duke Blue Devils (7–2) at No. 7 Miami Hurricanes (8–1) – Game summary

Quarter	1	2	3	4	Total
Blue Devils	0	10	7	8	25
No. 7 Hurricanes	0	13	9	14	36

at Hard Rock Stadium • Miami Gardens, Florida

- Date: November 14
- Game time: 12:00 p.m. EST
- TV announcers (ABC): Bob Wischusen, Louis Riddick, and Stormy Buonantony

Statistics	DUKE	MIA
First downs		
Plays–yards		
Rushes–yards		
Passing yards		
Passing: comp–att–int		
Time of possession		

Team	Category	Player	Statistics
Duke	Passing		
Duke	Rushing		
Duke	Receiving		
Miami (FL)	Passing		
Miami (FL)	Rushing		
Miami (FL)	Receiving		

=== vs Clemson ===
Clemson Tigers (6–4) at Duke Blue Devils (7–3) – Game summary

Quarter	1	2	Total
Tigers			0
Blue Devils			0

at Wallace Wade Stadium • Durham, North Carolina

- Date: November 20
- Game time: 7:30 p.m. EST
- TV announcers (ESPN): TBD

Statistics	CLEM	DUKE
First downs		
Plays–yards		
Rushes–yards		
Passing yards		
Passing: comp–att–int		
Time of possession		

Team	Category	Player	Statistics
Clemson	Passing		
Clemson	Rushing		
Clemson	Receiving		
Duke	Passing		
Duke	Rushing		
Duke	Receiving		

=== at Wake Forest ===
Duke Blue Devils (7–4) at Wake Forest Demon Deacons (10–1) – Game summary

Quarter	1	2	Total
Blue Devils			0
Demon Deacons			0

at Allegacy Federal Credit Union Stadium • Winston-Salem, North Carolina

- Date: November 28
- Game time: TBD

Statistics	DUKE	WAKE
First downs		
Plays–yards		
Rushes–yards		
Passing yards		
Passing: comp–att–int		
Time of possession		

Team	Category	Player	Statistics
Duke	Passing		
Duke	Rushing		
Duke	Receiving		
Wake Forest	Passing		
Wake Forest	Rushing		
Wake Forest	Receiving		
