= Stacy Tutt =

American football player (born 1982)

No. 45
- Position: Fullback

Personal information
- Born: August 8, 1982 (age 44); Fredericksburg, Virginia, U.S.
- Listed height: 6 ft 1 in (1.85 m)
- Listed weight: 233 lb (106 kg)

Career information
- High school: Essex (Tappahannock, Virginia); Fork Union Military Academy (Fork Union, Virginia)
- College: Richmond
- NFL draft: 2006: undrafted

Career history
- New York Jets (2006–2007)

Career NFL statistics
- Games played: 11
- Stats at Pro Football Reference

Stacy L. Tutt III (born August 8, 1982) is an American former professional football player who was a fullback for the New York Jets of the National Football League (NFL). He played college football for the Richmond Spiders and was signed by the Jets as an undrafted free agent in 2006.

== Early life ==
Tutt attended high school at Essex High School in Tappahannock, Virginia.

== College career ==
Tutt was a quarterback at the University of Richmond, where he ranks second all-time in career total offense, third in career passing yards, and fourth in career touchdown passes.

== Professional career ==
Initially signed to the Jets' practice squad, Tutt was added to the active roster in 2007 and saw action in the first nine games of the season before suffering a season-ending knee injury. Tutt was re-signed by the Jets to an exclusive-rights contract on February 29, 2008.

On April 28, 2008, Tutt was released by the Jets.

== Coaching career ==
Tutt was named running backs coach at his alma mater, the University of Richmond, in February 2009 and served in that capacity for two seasons before stepping down.
