= Essex High School (Virginia) =

Location
- 833 High School Circle; Tappahannock, Virginia 22560; United States; 37°55′29.5″N 76°52′3.9″W

Information
- School type: Public, high school
- Motto: Home of the Trojans
- Founded: 1978
- School district: Essex County Public Schools
- Superintendent: Dr. Marvin Jones
- Principal: Rashaad Pitt
- Teaching staff: 29.00 (on an FTE basis)
- Grades: 8–12
- Enrollment: 410 (2023-24)
- Student to teacher ratio: 14.14
- Language: English
- Colors: Purple and gold
- Athletics conference: Virginia High School League; Northern Neck District; Conference 43 - 1A East
- Mascot: Trojan
- Feeder schools: Essex Intermediate School Tappahannock Elementary School
- Website: Official site

Essex High School is a high school located in the town of Tappahannock, in Essex County, Virginia, United States.

== Academics ==
EHS is ranked among the top 15,000~ public high schools in America, and 290~ in Virginia. The school is performing below expectations on state testing, Math 64%, Reading 78%, and Science 65%. The graduation rate is 96%.

== Notable alumni ==
- Chris Brown – singer, songwriter, dancer and actor (attended)
- Darryl Hammond – Arena Football League player
- Kam Robinson – college football linebacker for the Virginia Cavaliers
- Stacy Tutt – former NFL football player
