= Clev Lubin =

American football player

No. 50 – Louisville Cardinals
- Position: Defensive end
- Class: Redshirt Senior

Personal information
- Listed height: 6 ft 3 in (1.91 m)
- Listed weight: 260 lb (118 kg)

Career information
- High school: USMAPS (West Point, New York)
- College: Army (2022); Iowa Western (2023); Coastal Carolina (2024); Louisville (2025–present)

Awards and highlights
- First-team NJCAA All-American (2023); First-team All-Sun Belt (2024); Third-team All-ACC (2025)
- Stats at ESPN

Clevmer Lubin (CLEV-mah LOO-bin) is an American college football defensive end for the Louisville Cardinals. He previously played for the Army Black Knights, Iowa Western Reivers, and Coastal Carolina Chanticleers.

== Early life ==
Lubin played football and basketball for Suffern High School and was considered one of the best players the school has produced. He played as both a defensive end and running back, and during his senior season he recorded 1,053 rushing yards and 16 touchdowns on 110 carries. He also set a program record of 1,062 rushing yards during the 2019 season. Due to his success on the field, he was named the Gatorade New York State Player of the Year as a senior and was also named The Journal News Rockland County Football Player of the Year. Lubin received several Division I offers, and on December 14, 2020, he committed to play at Army. Following his senior season, Lubin spent a year prepping at USMAPS before joining the Black Knights in 2022.

== College career ==
=== Army ===
After joining the Black Knights, Lubin did not see any game action his true freshman season and transferred to Iowa Western.

=== Iowa Western ===
While at Iowa Western, Lubin helped lead the team to the NJCAA D1 Football National Championship. Following the season he was named a first-team NJCAA All-American.

=== Coastal Carolina ===
On July 1, 2024, Lubin enrolled at Coastal Carolina. In 10 games, he finished 16th nationally in sacks and contributed 12.5 tackles for loss. Following the season, he was given First-Team All-Sun Belt honors.

After the season, Lubin again entered the transfer portal.

=== Louisville ===
On December 21, 2024, Lubin committed to Louisville. On January 2, 2026, Lubin announced he would return to Louisville for another season.

=== College statistics ===
Year	Team	GP	Tackles					Interceptions					Fumbles			
Year	Team	GP	Solo	Ast	Cmb	TfL	Sck	Int	Yds	Avg	TD	PD	FR	Yds	TD	FF
2022	Army	0	(redshirt) Redshirted													
2023	Iowa Western	12	31	24	55	23.5	11.5	0	—	—	—	1	3	15	1	4
2024	Coastal Carolina	10	24	20	44	12	9.5	0	—	—	—	3	1	0	1	3
2025	Louisville	13	35	26	61	13.5	8.5	0	—	—	—	5	0	—	—	3
NJCAA Career		12	31	24	55	23.5	11.5	0	—	—	—	1	3	15	1	4
NCAA Career		23	59	46	105	25.5	18.0	0	—	—	—	8	1	0	1	6
