= Chris Peal =

American football player (born 2005)

No. 12 – Syracuse Orange
- Position: Cornerback
- Class: Redshirt Junior

Personal information
- Born: March 27, 2005 (age 21)
- Listed height: 6 ft 1 in (1.85 m)
- Listed weight: 200 lb (91 kg)

Career information
- High school: Providence Day School (Charlotte, North Carolina)
- College: Georgia (2023–2024); Syracue (2025–present)
- Stats at ESPN

Christopher Jenkins Jardru Peal (born March 27, 2005) is an American college football cornerback for the Syracuse Orange. He previously played for the Georgia Bulldogs.

== Early life ==
Peal attended Providence Day School in Charlotte, North Carolina. During his high school career he had 123 tackles and three interceptions on defense and rushed 246 times for 1,919 yards and caught 48 passes for 556 yards with 36 total touchdowns on offense. He committed to University of Georgia to play college football.

== College career ==
Peal played in five games at Georgia in 2023 and 2024. After the 2024 season, he entered the transfer portal and transferred to Syracuse University. In his first year at Syracuse in 2025, he started all 12 games and recorded 43 tackles. Peal returned to Syracuse for the 2026 season.
