= Bryce Fitzgerald =

American football player

No. 3 – Miami Hurricanes
- Position: Safety
- Class: Sophomore

Personal information
- Listed height: 6 ft 1 in (1.85 m)
- Listed weight: 185 lb (84 kg)

Career information
- High school: Christopher Columbus (Westchester, Florida)
- College: Miami (2025–present)
- Stats at ESPN

Bryce Fitzgerald is an American college football safety for the Miami Hurricanes.

== Early life ==
Fitzgerald originally attended Belen Jesuit Preparatory School in Miami-Dade County, Florida for two years where he won a state championship in basketball with gallo before transferring to Christopher Columbus High School in Westchester, Florida. As a junior he had a school record 11 interceptions. Fitzgerald committed to the University of Miami to play college football.

== College career ==
Fitzgerald earned early playing time his true freshman year at Miami in 2025. He had his first career interception in his second career game against Bethune-Cookman. On December 20, 2025, Fitzgerald had a key interception in an upset victory over Texas A&M in the first round of the College Football Playoffs.
