= Kam Robinson =

American football linebacker (born 2005)

No. 5 – Virginia Cavaliers
- Position: Linebacker
- Class: Senior

Personal information
- Born: January 13, 2005 (age 21)
- Listed height: 6 ft 2 in (1.88 m)
- Listed weight: 235 lb (107 kg)

Career information
- High school: Essex (Tappahannock, Virginia)
- College: Virginia (2023–present)

Awards and highlights
- Third-team All-ACC (2025)
- Stats at ESPN

Kamren Robinson (born January 13, 2005) is an American football linebacker for the Virginia Cavaliers.

== Early life ==
Robinson attended Essex High School in Tappahannock, Virginia. He was rated as a three-star recruit and the 8th overall player in the state of Virginia. Robinson committed to play college football for the Virginia Cavaliers over offers from other schools such as Penn State, Tennessee, Florida State, and Ole Miss.

== College career ==
As a freshman in 2023, Robinson totaled 71 tackles with four and a half going for a loss, two interceptions, and a touchdown. During the 2024 season, he put up 64 tackles and five sacks. In week 8 of the 2025 season, Robinson recorded the game-winning safety in a 22-20 win against Washington State. In week 10, he notched the game-sealing interception which he returned 35-yards for a touchdown versus California. In week 12, Robinson suffered a season-ending torn ACL versus Duke. He finished the season with 64 tackles with four and a half going for a loss, two sacks, a pass deflection, two interceptions, a fumble recovery, a blocked punt, and two touchdowns in eight games.
