= Ahmad Moten Sr. =

American football player (born 2004)

No. 99 – Miami Hurricanes
- Position: Defensive tackle
- Class: Redshirt Senior

Personal information
- Born: April 22, 2004 (age 22)
- Listed height: 6 ft 3 in (1.91 m)
- Listed weight: 300 lb (136 kg)

Career information
- High school: Cardinal Gibbons (Fort Lauderdale, Florida)
- College: Miami (2022–present)

Awards and highlights
- Second-team All-ACC (2025)
- Stats at ESPN

Ahmad Moten Sr. (born April 22, 2004) is an American college football defensive tackle for the Miami Hurricanes.

== Early life ==
Moten Sr. attended Cardinal Gibbons High School in Fort Lauderdale, Florida. As a senior he had 39 tackles and three sacks. He committed to the University of Miami to play college football.

== College career ==
Moten Sr. played in two games and reshirted his first year at Miami in 2022. He played in 11 games and had two tackles with one interception as a redshirt freshman in 2023 and started two of 11 games, recording 18 tackles with one sack as a redshirt sophomore in 2024. Moten Sr. returned to Miami as a starter his redshirt junior year in 2025.
