= Kemari Copeland =

American football player

No. 13 – Virginia Tech Hokies
- Position: Defensive lineman
- Class: Redshirt Senior

Personal information
- Listed height: 6 ft 2 in (1.88 m)
- Listed weight: 290 lb (132 kg)

Career information
- High school: Floyd E. Kellam (Virginia Beach, Virginia)
- College: Army (2022); Iowa Western (2023); Virginia Tech (2024–present)

Awards and highlights
- Third-team All-ACC (2025)
- Stats at ESPN

Kemari Copeland is an American football defensive tackle for the Virginia Tech Hokies. He previously played for the Army Black Knights and the Iowa Western Reivers.

== Early life ==
Copeland attended Floyd E. Kellam High School in Virginia Beach, Virginia. He was rated as a two-star recruit by 247Sports and committed to play college football for the Army Black Knights.

== College career ==
=== Army ===
As a freshman in 2022, Copeland played in seven games, recording one tackle. After the conclusion of the season, he entered the NCAA transfer portal.

=== Iowa Western ===
Copeland transferred to play for the Iowa Western Reivers. In 2023, he totaled 38 tackles with nine being for a loss, four and a half sacks, a pass deflection, and a fumble recovery in 13 games played. After the conclusion of the season, Copeland once again entered the NCAA transfer portal.

=== Virginia Tech ===
Copeland transferred to play for the Virginia Tech Hokies. During the 2024 season, he notched six tackles in four games before tearing his tricep. In week 9 of the 2025 season, he recorded seven tackles with three being for a loss, and three sacks in an overtime win over California. Copeland started all 12 games in 2025, recording 48 tackles with seven and a half being for a loss, four and a half sacks, and an interception. For his performance, he earned third-team all-ACC honors. Heading into the 2026 season, Copeland broke the school record with a 510-pound bench press.
