= Duke–Virginia football rivalry =

American college football rivalry

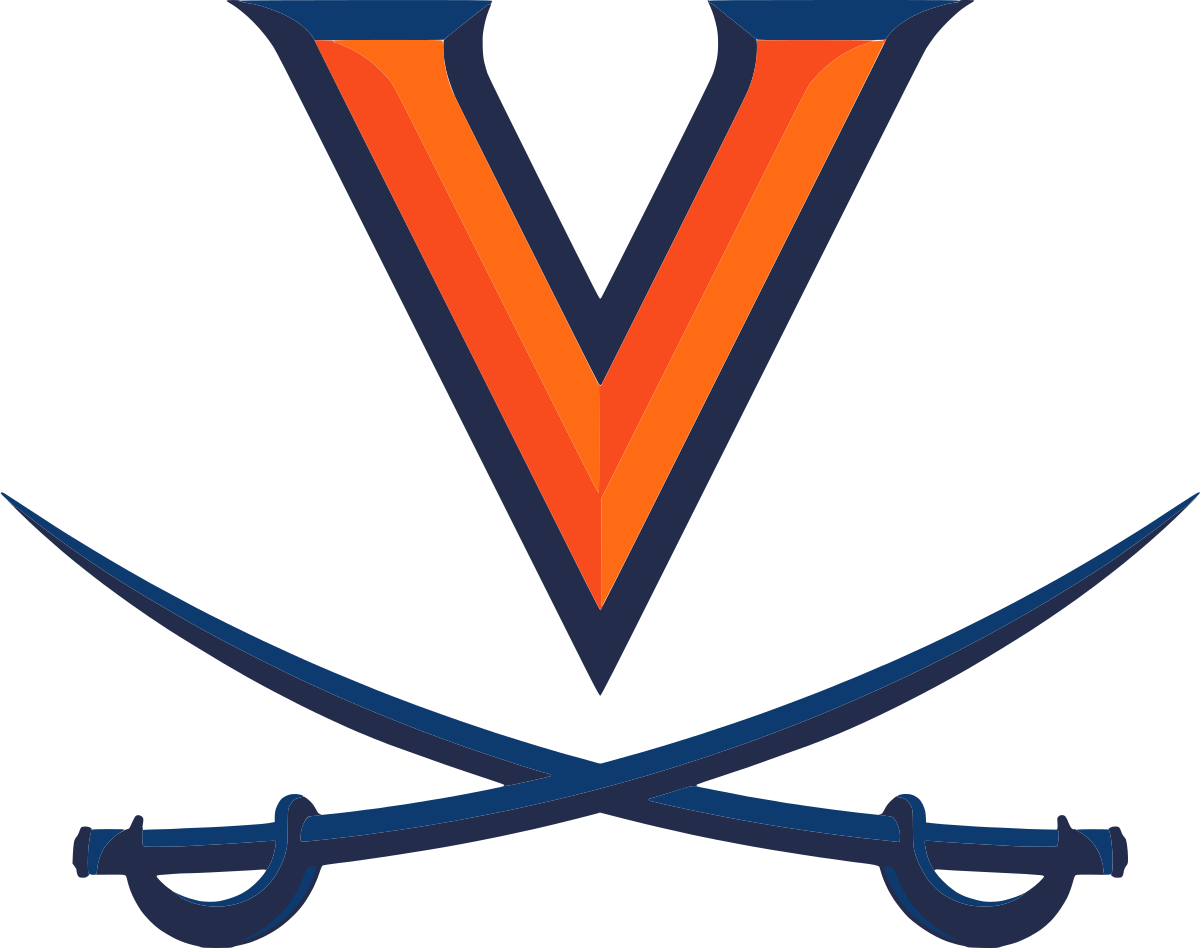
- Duke Blue Devils Virginia Cavaliers
- First meeting: November 27, 1890; Virginia, 10–4
- Latest meeting: October 23, 2026; Duke, 19–16
- Next meeting: 2028
- Trophy: None

Statistics
- Total meetings: 78
- All-time series: Virginia leads, 42–36
- Largest victory: Virginia, 59–0 (1990)
- Longest win streak: Virginia, 8 (2000–07)
- Current win streak: Duke, 2 (2025–present)

Locations of Duke and Virginia

The Duke–Virginia football rivalry is an American college football rivalry game between the Duke Blue Devils and Virginia Cavaliers.

== History ==
The two bordering-state universities in the southern United States have spent most of their athletic histories as members of the same conference; first the Southern Conference from 1930 to 1936 before helping found the Atlantic Coast Conference (ACC) in 1954 where they remain as members to the present day. The series has been played 76 times dating back to the first meeting in 1890, and the teams met on the football field every year uninterrupted from 1963 to 2023. When the ACC split into non-geographical divisions in 2005, both Duke and Virginia were placed in the "Coastal" division which guaranteed an annual football meeting between the schools. Beginning with the 2023 season, however, the conference eliminated divisions in favor of a scheduling arrangement that calls for three annual conference opponents for each member while rotating the other five conference opponents. Duke and Virginia were not designated as one of each other's three annual conference football opponents, and consequently the rivalry will be played intermittently for the foreseeable future.

The rivalry reached its peak in the late 1980s during the respective head coaching tenures of Steve Spurrier at Duke (1987 to 1989) and George Welsh at Virginia (1982 to 2000). The beef between Spurrier and Welsh actually went back to 1982, when Welsh accused Spurrier, then the offensive coordinator of the Blue Devils, of running up the score in Duke's 51–17 win. Then in 1989, the Cavaliers defeated the Blue Devils 49–28, but at the end of the regular season the teams found themselves in a three-way tie with Clemson for the ACC championship. To Welsh's annoyance, Spurrier publicly claimed despite losing to the Cavaliers that his Blue Devils deserved the league title by virtue of their victory over Clemson, the defending league champion, a week after the Virginia game. Spurrier also accused Welsh of unethical recruiting tactics, a charge Welsh denied. Additionally, the 1993 matchup between the teams, a 35–0 win for Virginia, was notable for a bench-clearing brawl between players on both teams.

In 2025, Virginia and Duke finished first and second, respectively, in the ACC regular-season standings. Duke would go on to defeat Virginia in the ACC Championship Game to claim its first conference title since 1989, which Duke ironically shared with Virginia.

== Game results ==
Duke victories	Virginia victories	Ties

No.	Date	Location	Winner	Score
1	November 27, 1890	Richmond, VA	Virginia	10–4
2	November 28, 1891	Richmond, VA	Duke	20–0
3	November 24, 1892	Atlanta, GA	Virginia	46–4
4	November 11, 1893	Lynchburg, VA	Virginia	30–0
5	October 27, 1923	Charlottesville, VA	Virginia	33–0
6	October 4, 1930	Durham, NC	Duke	32–0
7	November 13, 1943	Durham, NC	Duke	49–0
8	October 27, 1951	Durham, NC	Virginia	30–7
9	October 25, 1952	Charlottesville, VA	Duke	21–7
10	October 31, 1953	Norfolk, VA	Duke	48–6
11	September 29, 1956	Charlottesville, VA	Duke	40–7
12	September 28, 1957	Durham, NC	Duke	40–0
13	September 27, 1958	Charlottesville, VA	Virginia	15–12
14	September 30, 1961	Richmond, VA	Duke	42–0
15	September 28, 1963	Charlottesville, VA	Duke	30–8
16	September 26, 1964	Durham, NC	Duke	30–0
17	September 18, 1965	Charlottesville, VA	Duke	21–7
18	October 1, 1966	Durham, NC	Duke	27–8
19	October 14, 1967	Charlottesville, VA	Duke	13–6
20	October 12, 1968	Durham, NC	Virginia	50–20
21	September 27, 1969	Charlottesville, VA	Virginia	10–0
22	September 26, 1970	Durham, NC	Duke	17–7
23	September 25, 1971	Charlottesville, VA	Duke	28–0
24	September 30, 1972	Durham, NC	Duke	37–13
25	September 29, 1973	Charlottesville, VA	Virginia	7–3
26	September 28, 1974	Durham, NC	Duke	27–7
27	September 27, 1975	Durham, NC	Duke	26–11
28	September 25, 1976	Charlottesville, VA	Duke	21–6
29	September 24, 1977	Charlottesville, VA	Duke	31–7
30	October 7, 1978	Durham, NC	Duke	20–13
31	September 29, 1979	Charlottesville, VA	Virginia	30–12
32	September 27, 1980	Durham, NC	Virginia	20–17
33	September 26, 1981	Charlottesville, VA	Duke	29–24
34	September 25, 1982	Durham, NC	Duke	51–17
35	September 3, 1983	Charlottesville, VA	Virginia	38–30
36	October 6, 1984	Durham, NC	Virginia	38–10
37	October 5, 1985	Charlottesville, VA	Virginia	37–14
38	September 27, 1986	Durham, NC	Duke	20–13
39	September 26, 1987	Charlottesville, VA	Virginia	42–17
40	September 24, 1988	Durham, NC	Duke	38–34

No.	Date	Location	Winner	Score
41	September 23, 1989	Charlottesville, VA	Virginia	49–28
42	September 22, 1990	Durham, NC	Virginia	59–0
43	September 28, 1991	Charlottesville, VA	Virginia	34–3
44	September 26, 1992	Durham, NC	Virginia	55–28
45	September 25, 1993	Charlottesville, VA	Virginia	35–0
46	November 5, 1994	Durham, NC	Duke	28–25
47	October 14, 1995	Charlottesville, VA	Virginia	44–30
48	November 2, 1996	Durham, NC	Virginia	27–3
49	October 18, 1997	Charlottesville, VA	Virginia	13–10
50	September 26, 1998	Durham, NC	Virginia	24–0
51	October 9, 1999	Charlottesville, VA	Duke	24–17^{2OT}
52	September 16, 2000	Durham, NC	Virginia	26–10
53	September 29, 2001	Charlottesville, VA	Virginia	31–10
54	October 5, 2002	Durham, NC	Virginia	27–22
55	August 30, 2003	Charlottesville, VA	Virginia	27–0
56	October 23, 2004	Durham, NC	Virginia	37–16
57	September 24, 2005	Charlottesville, VA	Virginia	38–7
58	September 30, 2006	Durham, NC	Virginia	37–0
59	September 8, 2007	Charlottesville, VA	Virginia	24–13
60	September 27, 2008	Durham, NC	Duke	31–3
61	October 31, 2009	Charlottesville, VA	Duke	28–17
62	November 6, 2010	Durham, NC	Duke	55–48
63	November 12, 2011	Charlottesville, VA	Virginia	31–21
64	October 6, 2012	Durham, NC	Duke	42–17
65	October 19, 2013	Charlottesville, VA	Duke	35–22
66	October 18, 2014	Durham, NC	Duke	20–13
67	November 21, 2015	Charlottesville, VA	Virginia	42–34
68	October 1, 2016	Durham, NC	Virginia	34–20
69	October 7, 2017	Charlottesville, VA	Virginia	28–21
70	October 20, 2018	Durham, NC	Virginia	28–14
71	October 19, 2019	Charlottesville, VA	Virginia	48–14
72	September 26, 2020	Charlottesville, VA	Virginia	38–20
73	October 16, 2021	Charlottesville, VA	Virginia	48–0
74	October 1, 2022	Durham, NC	Duke	38–17
75	November 18, 2023	Charlottesville, VA	Virginia	30–27
76	November 15, 2025	Durham, NC	Virginia	34–17
77	December 6, 2025	Charlotte, NC	Duke	27–20^{OT}
78	October 23, 2026	Charlottesville, VA	Duke	19–16
Series: Virginia leads 42–36

== See also ==
- List of NCAA college football rivalry games
