= Duke–NC State football rivalry =

American college football rivalry

- Duke Blue Devils NC State Wolfpack
- First meeting: September 27, 1924; NC State 14, Duke 0
- Latest meeting: November 7, 2026; Duke 41, NC State 3
- Next meeting: 2027
- Trophy: None

Statistics
- Total meetings: 87
- All-time series: Duke leads, 45–37–5
- Largest victory: Duke, 75–0 (1943)
- Longest win streak: NC State, 11 (1994–2008)
- Current win streak: Duke, 4 (2023–present)

Locations of the two universities in North Carolina.

The Duke–NC State football rivalry is an American college football rivalry game between the Duke Blue Devils and NC State Wolfpack.

== History ==
This game is part of the larger Tobacco Road rivalry between North Carolina Power 5 universities NC State, North Carolina, Duke and Wake Forest. The series is also significant due to the geographical location of both schools, with just 30 miles separating the respective campuses. The rivalry dates back to 1924 and was played every year uninterrupted from then until 2003 except for 1944. After the Atlantic Coast Conference split into non-geographical divisions in 2004, the Wolfpack and Blue Devils were placed in opposite divisions and weren't designated as each other's annual cross divisional opponent, thereby ending the annual series and making the rivalry intermittent. With the ACC ending the divisional format after the 2022 season in favor of an arrangement that calls for three annual conference opponents with five rotating, the four North Carolina schools were designated as all three of each other's annual conference opponents, thus reviving the annual series between the Wolfpack and Blue Devils for the foreseeable future. Duke dominated the early years of the rivalry but NC State has won 15 of 20 since 1990. As of 2026, Duke leads the all-time series 45–37–5.

== Game results ==
Duke victories	NC State victories	Tie games

No.	Date	Location	Winner	Score
1	September 27, 1924	Raleigh, NC	NC State	14–0
2	October 3, 1925	Durham, NC	NC State	13–0
3	November 13, 1926	Raleigh, NC	NC State	26–19
4	November 12, 1927	Durham, NC	NC State	20–18
5	November 17, 1928	Raleigh, NC	Duke	14–12
6	November 16, 1929	Durham, NC	Duke	19–12
7	November 15, 1930	Raleigh, NC	Duke	18–0
8	November 14, 1931	Durham, NC	NC State	14–0
9	November 12, 1932	Raleigh, NC	NC State	6–0
10	November 25, 1933	Durham, NC	Duke	7–0
11	December 1, 1934	Durham, NC	Duke	32–0
12	November 23, 1935	Raleigh, NC	Duke	7–0
13	November 26, 1936	Durham, NC	Duke	13–0
14	November 20, 1937	Raleigh, NC	Duke	20–7
15	November 19, 1938	Durham, NC	Duke	7–0
16	November 25, 1939	Raleigh, NC	Duke	28–0
17	November 23, 1940	Durham, NC	Duke	42–6
18	November 22, 1941	Raleigh, NC	Duke	55–6
19	November 21, 1942	Durham, NC	Duke	47–0
20	November 6, 1943	Raleigh, NC	Duke	75–0
21	November 10, 1945	Durham, NC	Duke	26–13
22	September 28, 1946	Raleigh, NC	NC State	13–6
23	September 27, 1947	Durham, NC	Duke	7–0
24	September 25, 1948	Raleigh, NC	Tie	0–0
25	October 15, 1949	Durham, NC	Duke	14–13
26	October 14, 1950	Raleigh, NC	Duke	7–0
27	October 13, 1951	Durham, NC	Duke	27–21
28	October 18, 1952	Raleigh, NC	Duke	57–0
29	October 24, 1953	Durham, NC	Duke	31–0
30	October 23, 1954	Raleigh, NC	Duke	21–7
31	September 24, 1955	Raleigh, NC	Duke	33–7
32	October 27, 1956	Durham, NC	Duke	42–0
33	October 26, 1957	Raleigh, NC	Tie	14–14
34	October 25, 1958	Durham, NC	Duke	20–13
35	October 24, 1959	Raleigh, NC	Duke	17–15
36	October 15, 1960	Durham, NC	Duke	17–13
37	October 28, 1961	Raleigh, NC	Duke	17–6
38	October 27, 1962	Durham, NC	Duke	21–14
39	October 26, 1963	Raleigh, NC	NC State	21–7
40	October 17, 1964	Durham, NC	Duke	35–3
41	November 6, 1965	Raleigh, NC	NC State	21–0
42	October 22, 1966	Durham, NC	NC State	33–7
43	October 28, 1967	Raleigh, NC	NC State	28–7
44	November 9, 1968	Durham, NC	NC State	17–15

No.	Date	Location	Winner	Score
45	October 25, 1969	Raleigh, NC	Tie	25–25
46	October 17, 1970	Raleigh, NC	Duke	22–6
47	October 16, 1971	Durham, NC	Duke	41–13
48	October 7, 1972	Raleigh, NC	NC State	17–0
49	November 17, 1973	Durham, NC	NC State	21–3
50	September 14, 1974	Raleigh, NC	NC State	35–21
51	November 15, 1975	Durham, NC	Tie	21–21
52	November 13, 1976	Raleigh, NC	Duke	28–14
53	November 12, 1977	Durham, NC	NC State	37–32
54	November 18, 1978	Raleigh, NC	NC State	24–10
55	November 17, 1979	Durham, NC	NC State	28–7
56	November 15, 1980	Raleigh, NC	NC State	38–31
57	November 14, 1981	Durham, NC	Duke	17–7
58	November 13, 1982	Raleigh, NC	NC State	21–16
59	November 10, 1983	Durham, NC	Duke	27–26
60	November 17, 1984	Raleigh, NC	Duke	16–13
61	November 16, 1985	Durham, NC	Duke	31–19
62	November 15, 1986	Raleigh, NC	NC State	29–15
63	November 14, 1987	Durham, NC	NC State	47–45
64	November 12, 1988	Raleigh, NC	Tie	43–43
65	November 11, 1989	Durham, NC	Duke	35–26
66	November 10, 1990	Raleigh, NC	NC State	16–0
67	November 16, 1991	Durham, NC	NC State	32–31
68	November 14, 1992	Raleigh, NC	NC State	45–27
69	November 6, 1993	Durham, NC	Duke	21–20
70	November 12, 1994	Raleigh, NC	NC State	24–23
71	October 21, 1995	Durham, NC	NC State	41–38
72	November 9, 1996	Raleigh, NC	NC State	44–22
73	September 6, 1997	Durham, NC	NC State	45–14
74	October 17, 1998	Raleigh, NC	NC State	27–24
75	October 23, 1999	Durham, NC	NC State	31–24^{OT}
76	November 11, 2000	Raleigh, NC	NC State	35–31
77	November 3, 2001	Durham, NC	NC State	55–31
78	October 19, 2002	Raleigh, NC	NC State	24–22
79	October 25, 2003	Durham, NC	NC State	28–21
80	November 8, 2008	Durham, NC	NC State	27–17
81	October 10, 2009	Raleigh, NC	Duke	49–28
82	November 9, 2013	Durham, NC	Duke	38–20
83	October 17, 2020	Raleigh, NC	NC State	31–20
84	October 14, 2023	Durham, NC	Duke	24–3
85	November 9, 2024	Raleigh, NC	Duke	29–19
86	September 20, 2025	Durham, NC	Duke	45–33
87	November 7, 2026	Raleigh, NC	Duke	41–3
Series: Duke leads 45–37–5

Game results sources:

== Notable games ==
=== 1924: First meeting ===
NC State defeated Duke (then known as Trinity College) by a score of 14–0 in the first football game played between the schools.

=== 1928: Duke's first victory ===
In the fifth game between Duke and NC State, The Blue Devils emerged with a 14–12 victory, their first-ever win over the Wolfpack. Duke utilized two drop kicks throughout the game to help secure the win.

=== 1943: Largest victory ===
Duke prevailed 75–0 in the 1943 meeting, the largest margin of victory for either team in the history of the rivalry. The Blue Devils won despite 32 members of their football team being absent due to service in World War II.

=== 1948: First tie ===
The teams fought to a 0–0 tie in the 1948 meeting, the first such result in the history of the series. Both teams' defenses dominated en route to not allowing a single point scored.

=== 1999: First overtime game ===
NC State scored ten points in the final ten minutes of regulation and clinched the win with a seven-yard touchdown run from quarterback Jamie Barnette in overtime. To date, this is the only football game between the Blue Devils and Wolfpack to go into overtime.

=== 2002: Wolfpack rout Blue Devils en route to historic season ===
Quarterback Philip Rivers went 26 of 37 passing for 364 yards and two touchdowns to lead the Wolfpack to a 24–22 victory in the 2002 game. Duke had a chance to win it at the end but missed a 65-yard field goal attempt. The win improved NC State's season record to 8–0, matching the best start to a season in program history, and would set a new school record at season's end for victories in a season, finishing 11–3.

=== 2003: End of the annual series ===
The 2003 matchup saw the Wolfpack escape with a 28–21 win. This would be the last annual meeting between the teams for the next two decades, as the ACC moved to a divisional scheduling format the next year and placed the Blue Devils and Wolfpack in opposite divisions while not choosing not to make the cross-divisional matchup an annual game.

=== 2009: Blue Devils snap ACC skid ===
Quarterback Thad Lewis completed 40 of 50 passes for a career-high 459 yards and six touchdowns to lead the Blue Devils to a 49–28 win. In so doing, Duke snapped a 20-game conference losing skid dating back to 2003 and an eleven-game losing streak to NC State.

=== 2013: Two touchdowns in 16 seconds lift Blue Devils ===
Duke defensive back DeVon Edwards scored on a kickoff return touchdown plus two interceptions returned for touchdowns in just 16 seconds of game time to lift the Blue Devils to a 38–20 win over the Wolfpack. The win guaranteed Duke of their first winning season in nearly 20 years.

== See also ==
- List of NCAA college football rivalry games
- Tobacco Road (rivalry)
