= Duke–Wake Forest football rivalry =

American college football rivalry

- Duke Blue Devils Wake Forest Demon Deacons
- First meeting: November 27, 1889; Duke 8, Wake Forest 4
- Latest meeting: November 29, 2025; Duke 49, Wake Forest 32
- Next meeting: November 28, 2026

Statistics
- Total meetings: 105
- All-time series: Duke leads, 62–41–2
- Largest victory: Duke, 67–0 (1937)
- Longest win streak: Duke, 12 (1952–63); Wake Forest, 12 (2000–11)
- Current win streak: Duke, 4 (2022–present)

Locations of the two universities in North Carolina.

The Duke–Wake Forest football rivalry is an American college football rivalry game between the Duke Blue Devils and Wake Forest Demon Deacons.

== History ==
This rivalry started due to the schools' historical religious affiliations and close proximity to one another within the state of North Carolina (Wake Forest University was originally located in the town of Wake Forest before moving to Winston-Salem in 1956). Duke was originally known as Trinity College and the athletic teams were known as the Methodists, while Wake Forest's athletic teams were known at the time as the Baptists. The series record currently stands at 61–41–2 in favor of Duke through the completion of the 2024 season. Duke won the most recent matchup in 2025 by a score of 49–32. This matchup was the key final victory to propel Duke to qualify for the ACC championship game, which it would end up winning over Virginia. As of 2025, Wake Forest and Duke are thus the only Tobacco Road schools with ACC championship game victories since its inception. With the exception of 1943 due to World War II, the 1966 season and 2020 due to the COVID-19 pandemic, these teams have played each other in consecutive years uninterrupted since 1921, one of the most-played rivalries in college football with the intensity not skipping a beat. From 2005 to 2022, Duke and Wake Forest resided in opposite divisions within the ACC with the matchup protected as an annual rivalry. With the ACC ending the divisional format after the 2022 season in favor of an arrangement that calls for three annual conference opponents with five rotating, the four North Carolina schools were designated as all three of each other's annual conference opponents (except for the Wake Forest and UNC game), thus continuing the annual rivalry between the Blue Devils and Demon Deacons for the foreseeable future.

== Game results ==
Duke victories	Wake Forest victories	Ties

No.	Date	Location	Winner	Score
1	November 28, 1889	Raleigh, NC	Duke	8–4
2	March 29, 1890	Raleigh, NC	Wake Forest	32–0
3	October 18, 1893	Raleigh, NC	Duke	12–6
4	November 11, 1921	Raleigh, NC	Duke	17–0
5	November 11, 1922	Raleigh, NC	Duke	3–0
6	November 10, 1923	Winston-Salem, NC	Wake Forest	16–6
7	November 11, 1924	Durham, NC	Wake Forest	32–0
8	November 7, 1925	Durham, NC	Wake Forest	21–3
9	October 30, 1926	Goldsboro, NC	Wake Forest	21–0
10	October 29, 1927	Wake Forest, NC	Duke	32–6
11	November 10, 1928	Durham, NC	Duke	38–0
12	November 23, 1929	Durham, NC	Duke	20–0
13	November 22, 1930	Wake Forest, NC	Tie	13–13
14	October 23, 1931	Durham, NC	Duke	28–0
15	October 21, 1932	Durham, NC	Duke	9–0
16	October 7, 1933	Durham, NC	Duke	22–0
17	November 10, 1934	Durham, NC	Duke	28–7
18	September 21, 1935	Greensboro, NC	Duke	26–7
19	November 7, 1936	Wake Forest, NC	No. 15 Duke	20–0
20	November 6, 1937	Durham, NC	No. 11 Duke	67–0
21	October 22, 1938	Winston-Salem, NC	No. 9 Duke	7–0
22	October 28, 1939	Durham, NC	No. 12 Duke	6–0
23	October 26, 1940	Wake Forest, NC	Duke	23–0
24	September 27, 1941	Durham, NC	Duke	43–14
25	October 3, 1942	Wake Forest, NC	Wake Forest	20–7
26	November 11, 1944	Durham, NC	No. 20 Duke	34–0
27	October 13, 1945	Wake Forest, NC	No. 13 Duke	26–19
28	November 9, 1946	Durham, NC	Duke	13–0
29	October 25, 1947	Wake Forest, NC	No. 15 Duke	13–6
30	November 6, 1948	Durham, NC	No. 18 Wake Forest	27–20
31	November 5, 1949	Durham, NC	Wake Forest	27–7
32	November 11, 1950	Durham, NC	Wake Forest	13–7
33	November 10, 1951	Durham, NC	Wake Forest	19–13
34	November 15, 1952	Wake Forest, NC	Duke	14–7
35	September 26, 1953	Durham, NC	No. 10 Duke	19–0
36	November 13, 1954	Wake Forest, NC	Duke	28–21
37	November 19, 1955	Durham, NC	No. 20 Duke	14–0
38	November 17, 1956	Winston-Salem, NC	Duke	26–0
39	October 19, 1957	Durham, NC	No. 5 Duke	34–7
40	November 15, 1958	Winston-Salem, NC	Duke	29–0
41	November 14, 1959	Durham, NC	Duke	27–15
42	November 12, 1960	Winston-Salem, NC	No. 7 Duke	34–7
43	October 7, 1961	Durham, NC	Duke	23–3
44	November 17, 1962	Winston-Salem, NC	Duke	50–0
45	November 9, 1963	Durham, NC	Duke	39–7
46	November 7, 1964	Winston-Salem, NC	Wake Forest	20–7
47	November 13, 1965	Durham, NC	Duke	40–7
48	September 16, 1967	Raleigh, NC	Duke	31–13
49	November 16, 1968	Durham, NC	Duke	18–3
50	October 11, 1969	Winston-Salem, NC	Duke	27–20
51	November 7, 1970	Durham, NC	Wake Forest	28–14
52	November 13, 1971	Winston-Salem, NC	Wake Forest	23–7
53	November 11, 1972	Durham, NC	Wake Forest	9–7
54	November 10, 1973	Winston-Salem, NC	Tie	7–7

No.	Date	Location	Winner	Score
55	November 9, 1974	Durham, NC	Duke	23–7
56	November 8, 1975	Winston-Salem, NC	Duke	42–14
57	November 6, 1976	Durham, NC	Wake Forest	38–17
58	November 5, 1977	Winston-Salem, NC	Duke	38–14
59	November 11, 1978	Durham, NC	Duke	3–0
60	November 10, 1979	Winston-Salem, NC	No. 20 Wake Forest	17–14
61	November 8, 1980	Durham, NC	Wake Forest	27–24
62	November 7, 1981	Winston-Salem, NC	Duke	31–10
63	November 6, 1982	Durham, NC	Duke	46–26
64	November 5, 1983	Winston-Salem, NC	Duke	31–21
65	November 10, 1984	Durham, NC	Wake Forest	20–16
66	November 9, 1985	Winston-Salem, NC	Wake Forest	27–7
67	November 8, 1986	Durham, NC	Duke	38–36
68	November 7, 1987	Winston-Salem, NC	Wake Forest	30–27
69	November 5, 1988	Durham, NC	Wake Forest	35–16
70	November 4, 1989	Winston-Salem, NC	Duke	52–35
71	November 3, 1990	Durham, NC	Duke	57–20
72	November 9, 1991	Winston-Salem, NC	Wake Forest	31–14
73	November 7, 1992	Durham, NC	Wake Forest	28–14
74	October 23, 1993	Winston-Salem, NC	Duke	21–13
75	October 22, 1994	Winston-Salem, NC	No. 20 Duke	51–26
76	October 28, 1995	Durham, NC	Duke	42–26
77	November 16, 1996	Winston-Salem, NC	Wake Forest	17–16
78	October 25, 1997	Durham, NC	Wake Forest	38–24
79	October 10, 1998	Winston-Salem, NC	Duke	19–16
80	November 13, 1999	Durham, NC	Duke	48–35
81	November 4, 2000	Winston-Salem, NC	Wake Forest	28–26
82	October 13, 2001	Durham, NC	Wake Forest	42–35
83	October 12, 2002	Winston-Salem, NC	Wake Forest	36–10
84	October 18, 2003	Durham, NC	Wake Forest	42–13
85	October 30, 2004	Winston-Salem, NC	Wake Forest	24–22
86	October 29, 2005	Durham, NC	Wake Forest	44–6
87	September 9, 2006	Winston-Salem, NC	Wake Forest	14–13
88	October 6, 2007	Durham, NC	Wake Forest	41–36
89	November 1, 2008	Winston-Salem, NC	Wake Forest	33–30^{OT}
90	November 28, 2009	Durham, NC	Wake Forest	45–34
91	September 11, 2010	Winston-Salem, NC	Wake Forest	54–48
92	October 22, 2011	Durham, NC	Wake Forest	24–23
93	September 29, 2012	Winston-Salem, NC	Duke	34–27
94	November 23, 2013	Winston-Salem, NC	No. 25 Duke	28–21
95	November 29, 2014	Durham, NC	Duke	41–21
96	November 28, 2015	Winston-Salem, NC	Duke	27–21
97	September 10, 2016	Durham, NC	Wake Forest	24–14
98	November 25, 2017	Winston-Salem, NC	Duke	31–23
99	November 24, 2018	Durham, NC	Wake Forest	59–7
100	November 23, 2019	Winston-Salem, NC	Wake Forest	39–27
101	October 30, 2021	Winston-Salem, NC	No. 13 Wake Forest	45–7
102	November 26, 2022	Durham, NC	Duke	34–31
103	November 2, 2023	Durham, NC	Duke	24–21
104	November 30, 2024	Winston-Salem, NC	Duke	23–17
105	November 29, 2025	Durham, NC	Duke	49–32
106	November 28, 2026	Winston-Salem, NC		
Series: Duke leads 62–41–2

Game results sources:

== See also ==
- List of NCAA college football rivalry games
- List of most-played college football series in NCAA Division I
