= Duke–Georgia Tech football rivalry =

American college football rivalry game

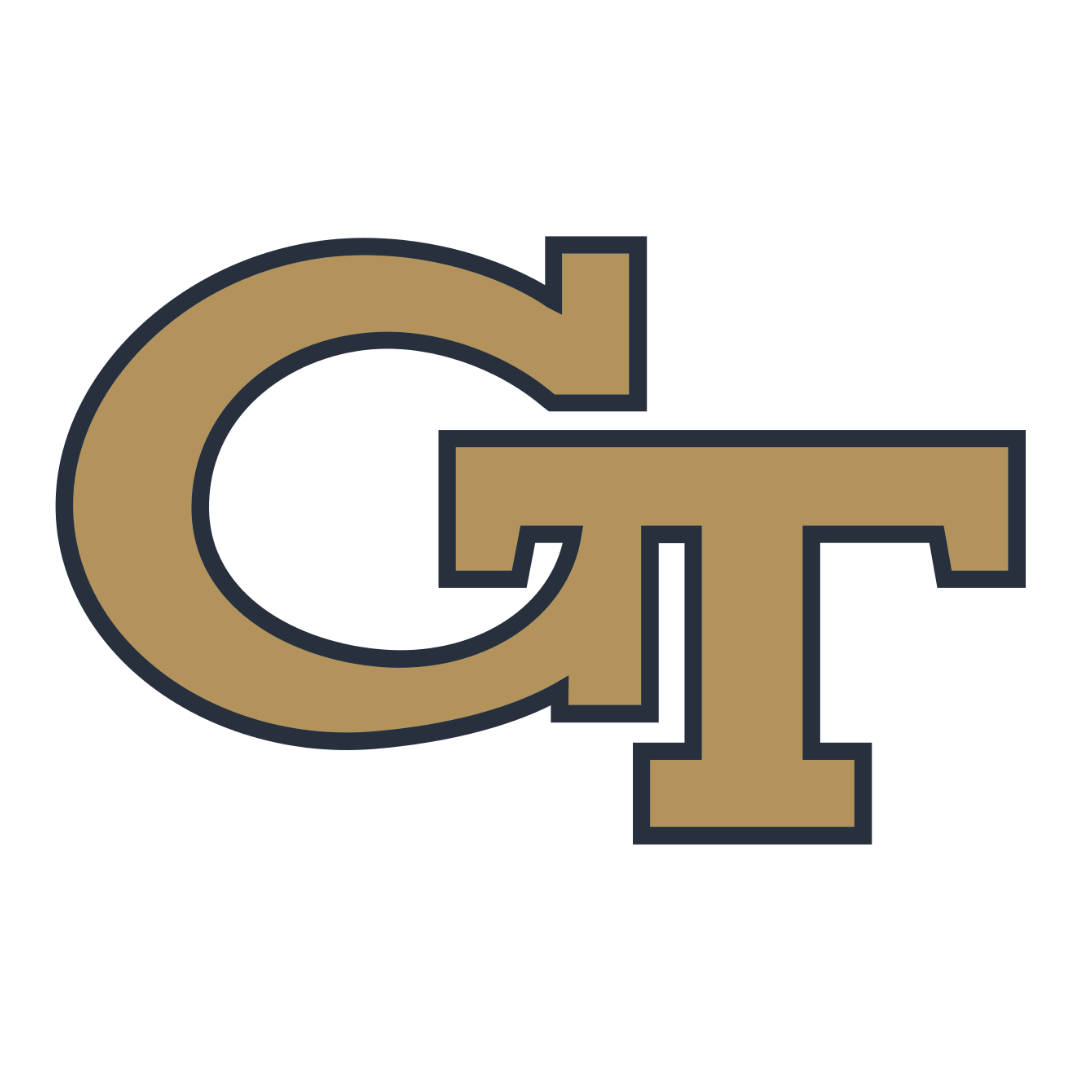
- Duke Blue Devils Georgia Tech Yellow Jackets
- First meeting: December 2, 1933; Georgia Tech, 6–0
- Latest meeting: October 10, 2026; Georgia Tech, 28–25
- Next meeting: 2028
- Trophy: None

Statistics
- Total meetings: 93
- All-time series: Georgia Tech leads, 57–35–1
- Largest victory: Georgia Tech, 48–7 (1966)
- Longest win streak: Georgia Tech, 10 (2004–13)
- Current win streak: Georgia Tech, 6 (2020–present)

Locations of Duke and Georgia Tech.

The Duke–Georgia Tech football rivalry is an American college football rivalry game between the Duke Blue Devils and Georgia Tech Yellow Jackets.

== History ==
The Duke Blue Devils and the Georgia Tech Yellow Jackets, located in bordering states in the southern United States, have played 92 times in a series that dates back to 1933 and every year uninterrupted until 2023. In addition to geographic proximity, prestigious academic standards throughout the universities' respective histories as well as football successes in the early 20th century contributed to the beginning of the football series with the competitiveness of the early football games between the schools helping shape the rivalry as a whole between Duke and Georgia Tech. Duke had its best years against Georgia Tech in the 1930s and 1940s, holding a 10–3 series lead over Georgia Tech after their 1945 meeting. From the start of the 1950s through the mid-1980s, the series was back and forth. In fact, heading into the 1984 season, the series record was deadlocked at 25–25–1. But since then it has been controlled by Georgia Tech, in part due to the decline in the overall performance of Duke football in the 1990s and 2000s. In the next 36 matchups after 1984, the Jackets earned 26 victories while the Blue Devils won just ten. The series was played annually as a non-conference matchup for the first fifty years of the rivalry until Georgia Tech joined the Atlantic Coast Conference (ACC) in 1983.

When the ACC split into non-geographical divisions in 2005, the Blue Devils and Yellow Jackets were both placed in the league's "Coastal" division which guaranteed an annual meeting on the football field. Duke is Georgia Tech's second-most common opponent all-time, behind only Georgia. Georgia Tech leads the series 56–35–1. This game decided the ACC Coastal Division champion in 2014. Although Duke won the game 31–25, they had a loss to Miami beforehand followed by losses to Virginia Tech and rival North Carolina, which allowed the Yellow Jackets to claim the division title and a trip to Charlotte for the ACC Championship as they just had 2 conference losses whereas Duke had 3. Georgia Tech won the last matchup 27–18 in Durham in 2025. When the ACC eliminated divisions in favor of a 3–5 scheduling format following the 2022 season, Duke–Georgia Tech were not designated as a protected annual football matchup and consequently became intermittent for the first time in its history; the 2023 season being the first season the teams didn't meet since 1932. The series continued in 2024 in Atlanta, 2025 in Durham and will next be played in 2026 in Atlanta. Beginning in 2023, the rivalry is occasionally missed due to the ACC's new scheduling format, not being played in 2023 and 2027 (barring a meeting in the ACC Championship Game).

== Game results ==
Duke victories	Georgia Tech victories	Ties

No.	Date	Location	Winner	Score
1	December 2, 1933	Atlanta, GA	Georgia Tech	6–0
2	October 13, 1934	Durham, NC	Duke	20–0
3	October 19, 1935	Atlanta, GA	Georgia Tech	6–0
4	October 17, 1936	Durham, NC	Duke	19–6
5	October 16, 1937	Atlanta, GA	Duke	20–19
6	October 15, 1938	Durham, NC	Duke	6–0
7	November 4, 1939	Atlanta, GA	#12 Duke	7–6
8	November 2, 1940	Durham, NC	#18 Duke	41–7
9	November 1, 1941	Atlanta, GA	#4 Duke	14–0
10	October 31, 1942	Durham, NC	#5 Georgia Tech	26–7
11	October 30, 1943	Atlanta, GA	#8 Duke	14–7
12	November 4, 1944	Durham, NC	Duke	19–13
13	November 3, 1945	Atlanta, GA	#18 Duke	14–6
14	November 2, 1946	Durham, NC	#16 Georgia Tech	14–0
15	November 1, 1947	Atlanta, GA	#6 Georgia Tech	7–0
16	October 30, 1948	Durham, NC	#6 Georgia Tech	19–7
17	October 29, 1949	Atlanta, GA	Duke	27–14
18	November 4, 1950	Durham, NC	Duke	30–21
19	November 3, 1951	Atlanta, GA	Tie	14–14
20	November 1, 1952	Durham, NC	#4 Georgia Tech	28–7
21	November 21, 1953	Atlanta, GA	#12 Georgia Tech	13–10
22	October 30, 1954	Durham, NC	#16 Duke	21–20
23	October 29, 1955	Atlanta, GA	#12 Georgia Tech	27–0
24	November 3, 1956	Durham, NC	#2 Georgia Tech	7–0
25	November 2, 1957	Atlanta, GA	Georgia Tech	13–0
26	November 1, 1958	Durham, NC	Georgia Tech	10–8
27	October 31, 1959	Atlanta, GA	Duke	10–7
28	October 29, 1960	Durham, NC	#15 Duke	6–0
29	October 14, 1961	Atlanta, GA	Georgia Tech	21–0
30	November 3, 1962	Durham, NC	Georgia Tech	20–9
31	November 2, 1963	Atlanta, GA	Georgia Tech	30–6
32	October 31, 1964	Durham, NC	#8 Georgia Tech	21–8
33	October 30, 1965	Atlanta, GA	Georgia Tech	35–23
34	October 29, 1966	Durham, NC	#6 Georgia Tech	48–7
35	November 4, 1967	Atlanta, GA	Georgia Tech	19–7
36	November 2, 1968	Durham, NC	Duke	46–30
37	November 1, 1969	Atlanta, GA	Georgia Tech	20–7
38	October 31, 1970	Durham, NC	Georgia Tech	24–16
39	October 30, 1971	Atlanta, GA	Georgia Tech	21–0
40	November 4, 1972	Durham, NC	Duke	20–14
41	November 3, 1973	Atlanta, GA	Georgia Tech	12–10
42	November 2, 1974	Durham, NC	Duke	9–0
43	November 1, 1975	Atlanta, GA	Georgia Tech	21–6
44	October 30, 1976	Durham, NC	Duke	31–7
45	October 29, 1977	Atlanta, GA	Duke	25–24
46	September 9, 1978	Durham, NC	Duke	28–10
47	November 3, 1979	Atlanta, GA	Georgia Tech	24–14

No.	Date	Location	Winner	Score
48	November 1, 1980	Durham, NC	Duke	17–12
49	October 31, 1981	Atlanta, GA	Duke	38–24
50	October 30, 1982	Atlanta, GA	Duke	38–21
51	October 29, 1983	Durham, NC	Duke	32–26
52	November 3, 1984	Atlanta, GA	Georgia Tech	31–3
53	November 2, 1985	Durham, NC	Georgia Tech	9–0
54	November 1, 1986	Atlanta, GA	Georgia Tech	34–6
55	October 31, 1987	Durham, NC	Duke	48–14
56	October 29, 1988	Atlanta, GA	Duke	31–21
57	October 28, 1989	Durham, NC	Duke	30–19
58	October 27, 1990	Atlanta, GA	#16 Georgia Tech	48–31
59	November 2, 1991	Durham, NC	Georgia Tech	17–6
60	October 31, 1992	Atlanta, GA	Georgia Tech	20–17
61	October 30, 1993	Durham, NC	Georgia Tech	47–14
62	September 24, 1994	Atlanta, GA	Duke	27–12
63	October 7, 1995	Durham, NC	Georgia Tech	37–21
64	September 26, 1996	Atlanta, GA	Georgia Tech	48–22
65	November 15, 1997	Durham, NC	Georgia Tech	41–38
66	October 3, 1998	Atlanta, GA	Georgia Tech	41–13
67	October 16, 1999	Durham, NC	#8 Georgia Tech	38–31
68	October 21, 2000	Atlanta, GA	Georgia Tech	45–10
69	October 6, 2001	Durham, NC	#17 Georgia Tech	37–10
70	November 16, 2002	Atlanta, GA	Georgia Tech	17–2
71	November 8, 2003	Durham, NC	Duke	41–17
72	October 16, 2004	Atlanta, GA	Georgia Tech	24–7
73	October 15, 2005	Durham, NC	Georgia Tech	35–10
74	November 18, 2006	Atlanta, GA	#18 Georgia Tech	49–21
75	November 10, 2007	Durham, NC	Georgia Tech	41–24
76	October 4, 2008	Atlanta, GA	Georgia Tech	27–0
77	November 14, 2009	Durham, NC	#7 Georgia Tech	49–10
78	November 20, 2010	Atlanta, GA	Georgia Tech	30–20
79	November 19, 2011	Durham, NC	Georgia Tech	38–31
80	November 17, 2012	Atlanta, GA	Georgia Tech	42–24
81	September 14, 2013	Durham, NC	Georgia Tech	38–14
82	October 11, 2014	Atlanta, GA	Duke	31–25
83	September 26, 2015	Durham, NC	Duke	34–20
84	October 29, 2016	Atlanta, GA	Georgia Tech	38–35
85	November 18, 2017	Durham, NC	Duke	43–20
86	October 13, 2018	Atlanta, GA	Duke	28–14
87	October 12, 2019	Durham, NC	Duke	41–23
88	November 28, 2020	Atlanta, GA	Georgia Tech	56–33
89	October 9, 2021	Durham, NC	Georgia Tech	31–27
90	October 8, 2022	Atlanta, GA	Georgia Tech	23–20^{OT}
91	October 5, 2024	Atlanta, GA	Georgia Tech	24–14
92	October 18, 2025	Durham, NC	#12 Georgia Tech	27–18
93	October 10, 2026	Atlanta, GA	Georgia Tech	28–25
Series: Georgia Tech leads 57–35–1

Game results sources:

== See also ==
- List of NCAA college football rivalry games
