= 2026 Virginia Tech Hokies football team =

American college football season

2026 Virginia Tech Hokies football
- Conference: Atlantic Coast Conference
- Record: 6–5 (3–5 ACC)
- Head coach: James Franklin (1st season)
- Offensive coordinator: Ty Howle (1st season)
- Offensive scheme: Pro spread
- Defensive coordinator: Brent Pry (1st season)
- Base defense: 4–3
- Home stadium: Lane Stadium

2026 Atlantic Coast Conference football standings
	Conf.			Overall
Team	W		L	W		L
No. 7 Miami (FL) y	8	–	0	10	–	1
No. 11 Wake Forest y	7	–	1	10	–	1
No. 23 Louisville	7	–	2	8	–	3
Clemson	5	–	3	7	–	4
SMU	5	–	3	7	–	4
Duke	4	–	4	7	–	4
Stanford	4	–	4	6	–	5
Virginia	4	–	4	6	–	5
Boston College	3	–	4	5	–	6
Pittsburgh	3	–	5	6	–	5
Virginia Tech	3	–	5	6	–	5
NC State	3	–	5	5	–	6
Florida State	3	–	5	5	–	6
Syracuse	3	–	6	5	–	6
North Carolina	2	–	5	5	–	6
California	2	–	6	3	–	8
Georgia Tech	2	–	6	3	–	8
Championship: Miami (FL) vs. Wake Forest
^ – College Football Playoff participant; $ – Conference champion; y – Championship game participant; As of November 22, 2026; Rankings from CFP rankings

The 2026 Virginia Tech Hokies football team represents Virginia Tech as a member of the Atlantic Coast Conference (ACC) during the 2026 NCAA Division I FBS football season. The Hokies are led by James Franklin in his first season as their head coach. They play their home games at Lane Stadium, which is located on their campus in Blacksburg, Virginia.

== Schedule ==
Date	Time	Opponent	Site	TV	Result	Attendance
September 5	7:30 p.m.	VMI (FCS)*	Lane Stadium; Blacksburg, VA (rivalry)	ACCN	W 73–3	65,632
September 12	12:00 p.m.	Old Dominion*	Lane Stadium; Blacksburg, VA	The CW	W 44–21	65,632
September 19	7:30 p.m.	at Maryland*	SECU Stadium; College Park, MD	FS1	W 35–26	46,185
September 26	12:00 p.m.	at Boston College	Alumni Stadium; Chestnut Hill, MA (rivalry)	ACCN	W 21–14	22,624
October 2	7:00 p.m.	Pittsburgh	Lane Stadium; Blacksburg, VA	ESPN	L 33–35	65,632
October 10	3:30 p.m.	at California	California Memorial Stadium; Berkeley, CA	ACCN	L 20–25	40,170
October 17	3:30 p.m.	Georgia Tech	Lane Stadium; Blacksburg, VA (rivalry)	ACCN	W 34–24	65,632
October 24	7:00 p.m.	at Clemson	Memorial Stadium; Clemson, SC	ESPN	W 20–16	80,510
November 6	7:00 p.m.	at SMU	Gerald J. Ford Stadium; University Park, TX	ESPN	L 28–51	32,566
November 14	7:30 p.m.	Stanford	Lane Stadium; Blacksburg, VA	ACCN	L 22–40	65,632
November 21	7:00 p.m.	at No. 7 Miami (FL)	Hard Rock Stadium; Miami Gardens, FL (rivalry)	ESPN	L 20–28	66,790
November 28	12:00 p.m.	Virginia	Lane Stadium; Blacksburg, VA (Commonwealth Cup)	The CW		
*Non-conference game; Rankings from AP Poll (and CFP Rankings, after November 3) – Released prior to game; All times are in Eastern time

== Game summaries ==
=== vs. VMI (FCS, rivalry) ===
VMI Keydets (FCS) (0–1) at Virginia Tech Hokies (0–0) – Game summary

Quarter	1	2	3	4	Total
Keydets (FCS)	0	0	0	3	3
Hokies	21	24	21	7	73

at Lane Stadium • Blacksburg, Virginia

- Date: September 5
- Game time: 7:30 p.m. EDT
- Game weather: Sunny • Temperature: 80 °F (27 °C) • Wind: NW 3 mph
- Game attendance: 65,632
- Referee: Darryl DeBerry
- TV announcers (ACCN): Wes Durham, Max Browne and Madison Fitzpatrick

Game information

First quarter

- (11:41) VT – Jeffrey Overton Jr. 50-yard run, John Love kick (Drive: 7 plays, 75 yards, 3:19; Hokies 7–0)
- (9:30) VT – Marcellous Hawkins Jr. 9-yard run, John Love kick (Drive: 1 plays, 9 yards, 0:05; Hokies 14–0)
- (4:56) VT – Jeffrey Overton Jr. 23-yard run, John Love kick (Drive: 7 plays, 56 yards, 2:30; Hokies 21–0)

Second quarter

- (14:37) VT – Marcellous Hawkins Jr. 1-yard run, John Love kick (Drive: 6 plays, 72 yards, 1:34; Hokies 28–0)
- (9:58) VT – John Love 32-yard field goal (Drive: 6 plays, 33 yards, 2:18; Hokies 31–0)
- (5:13) VT – Que'Sean Brown 51-yard pass from Ethan Grunkemeyer, John Love kick (Drive: 5 plays, 65 yards, 2:38; Hokies 38–0)
- (2:48) VT – Knahlij Harrell 0-yard punt return, John Love kick (Hokies 45–0)

Third quarter

- (12:33) VT – Luke Reynolds 21-yard pass from Ethan Grunkemeyer, John Love kick (Drive: 2 plays, 24 yards, 0:29; Hokies 52–0)
- (6:52) VT – Marcellous Hawkins Jr. 2-yard run, John Love kick (Drive: 9 plays, 55 yards, 4:18; Hokies 59–0)
- (0:33) VT – Chanz Wiggins 40-yard pass from Bryce Baker, John Love kick (Drive: 1 plays, 35 yards, 0:18; Hokies 66–0)

Fourth quarter

- (10:38) VT – A.J. Brand 1-yard run, John Love kick (Drive: 7 plays, 65 yards, 2:46; Hokies 73–0)
- (7:45) VMI – Jack Joyce 50-yard field goal (Drive: 4 plays, 3 yards, 0:53; Hokies 73–3)

Statistics	VMI	VT
First downs	6	30
Plays–yards	56–83	72–619
Rushes–yards	43–(-4)	40–268
Passing yards	87	351
Passing: comp–att–int	5–13–1	27–32–0
Turnovers	1	2
Time of possession	31:27	28:33

Team	Category	Player	Statistics
VMI	Passing	JoJo Crump	4/8, 54 yards, INT
VMI	Rushing	Traveion Slaughter	3 carries, 21 yards
VMI	Receiving	Halim Hardnett	1 reception, 33 yards
Virginia Tech	Passing	Ethan Grunkemeyer	17/20, 224 yards, 2 TD
Virginia Tech	Rushing	Jeffrey Overton Jr.	9 carries, 104 yards, 2 TD
Virginia Tech	Receiving	Que'Sean Brown	6 receptions, 109 yards, TD

=== vs. Old Dominion ===
Old Dominion Monarchs (1–0) at Virginia Tech Hokies (1–0) – Game summary

Quarter	1	2	3	4	Total
Monarchs	3	3	7	8	21
Hokies	17	17	3	7	44

at Lane Stadium • Blacksburg, Virginia

- Date: September 12
- Game time: 12:00 p.m. EDT
- Game weather: Cloudy • Temperature: 74 °F (23 °C) • Wind: N 0 mph
- Game attendance: 65,632
- Referee: Nolan Dumas
- TV announcers (The CW): Thom Brennaman, Jason Cabinda and Wes Bryant

Game information

First quarter

- VT – John Love 39-yard field goal, 10:23. Hokies 3–0. Drive: 11 plays, 54 yards, 4:37.
- VT – Marcellous Hawkins Jr. 20-yard run (John Love kick), 3:01. Hokies 10–0. Drive: 14 plays, 77 yards, 5:42.
- VT – Tyson Flowers 14-yard fumble return (John Love kick), 2:29. Hokies 17–0. Drive: 1 play, -6 yards, 0:05.
- ODU – Nathanial Eichner 34-yard field goal, 0:04. Hokies 17–3. Drive: 7 plays, 59 yards, 2:25.

Second quarter

- VT – Luke Reynolds 10-yard pass from Ethan Grunkemeyer (John Love kick), 8:23. Hokies 24–3. Drive: 14 plays, 75 yards, 6:41.
- VT – Luke Reynolds 16-yard pass from Ethan Grunkemeyer (John Love kick), 6:51. Hokies 31–3. Drive: 3 plays, 20 yards, 1:24.
- VT – John Love 22-yard field goal, 3:10. Hokies 34–3. Drive: 4 plays, -3 yards, 1:25.
- ODU – Nathanial Eichner 51-yard field goal, 0:00. Hokies 34–6. Drive: 1 play, 0 yards, 0:09.

Third quarter

- VT – John Love 25-yard field goal, 6:33. Hokies 37–6. Drive: 12 plays, 73 yards, 5:38.
- ODU – Leon Haughton Jr. 7-yard pass from Quinn Henicle (Nathanial Eichner kick), 1:14. Hokies 37–13. Drive: 11 plays, 75 yards, 5:19.

Fourth quarter

- VT – Ethan Grunkemeyer 1-yard run (John Love kick), 11:03. Hokies 44–13. Drive: 12 plays, 84 yards, 5:07.
- ODU – Quinn Henicle 76-yard run (Quinn Henicle two-point conversion run), 7:49. Hokies 44–21. Drive: 2 plays, 85 yards, 1:05.

Statistics	ODU	VT
First downs	11	26
Plays–yards	52–310	86–416
Rushes–yards	31–123	42–89
Passing yards	187	327
Passing: comp–att–int	13–21–0	32–44–0
Turnovers	3	2
Time of possession	21:30	38:30

Team	Category	Player	Statistics
Old Dominion	Passing	Quinn Henicle	13/21, 187 yards, TD
Old Dominion	Rushing	Quinn Henicle	16 carries, 83 yards, TD
Old Dominion	Receiving	Josh Rodriguez	3 receptions, 89 yards
Virginia Tech	Passing	Ethan Grunkemeyer	31/42, 327 yards, 2 TD
Virginia Tech	Rushing	Jeffrey Overton Jr.	14 carries, 47 yards
Virginia Tech	Receiving	Luke Reynolds	8 receptions, 108 yards, 2 TD

=== at Maryland ===
Virginia Tech Hokies (2–0) at Maryland Terrapins (2–0) – Game summary

Quarter	1	2	3	4	Total
Hokies	7	20	8	0	35
Terrapins	0	14	0	12	26

at SECU Stadium • College Park, Maryland

- Date: September 19
- Game time: 7:30 p.m. EDT
- Game weather: Sunny • Temperature: 76 °F (24 °C) • Wind: NE at 5 miles per hour (8.0 km/h)
- Game attendance: 46,185
- Referee: Garrett Dickerson
- TV announcers (FS1): Eric Collins and Spencer Tillman

Game information

First quarter

- (8:15) VT – Luke Reynolds 14-yard pass from Ethan Grunkemeyer, John Love kick (Drive: 13 plays, 75 yards, 6:45; Hokies 7–0)

Second quarter

- (14:51) VT – Ethan Grunkemeyer 18-yard run (Drive: 11 plays, 74 yards, 5:49; Hokies 13–0)
- (12:31) MD – Iverson Howard 2-yard run, Sean O'Haire (Drive: 7 plays, 75 yards, 2:20; Hokies 13–7)
- (9:14) VT – Jeffrey Overton Jr. 49-yard pass from Ethan Grunkemeyer, John Love kick (Drive: 7 plays, 75 yards, 3:17; Hokies 20–7)
- (2:11) MD – Chris Durr Jr. 12-yard pass from Malik Washington, Sean O'Haire kick (Drive: 5 plays, 67 yards, 2:05; Hokies 20–14)
- (0:16) VT – Ja'Ricous Hairston 2-yard pass from Ethan Grunkemeyer, John Love kick (Drive: 11 plays, 75 yards, 1:55; Hokies 27–14)

Third quarter

- (0:16) VT – Jeffrey Overton Jr. 2-yard run, Que'Sean Brown pass (Drive: 11 plays, 67 yards, 6:12; Hokies 35–14)

Fourth quarter

- (12:36) MD – Dorian Fleming 2-yard pass from Malik Washington (Drive: 13 plays, 81 yards, 5:07; Hokies 35–20)
- (5:34) MD – Chris Durr Jr. 13-yard pass from Malik Washington (Drive: 9 plays, 80 yards, 3:19; Hokies 35–26)

Statistics	VT	MD
First downs	25	23
Total yards	445	423
Rushes–yards	36–131	21–64
Passing yards	314	359
Passing: comp–att–int	31–39–0	30–43–0
Time of possession	36:39	23:21

Team	Category	Player	Statistics
Virginia Tech	Passing	Ethan Grunkemeyer	31–39, 314 yards, 3 TD
Virginia Tech	Rushing	Marcellous Hawkins Jr.	16 carries, 75 yards
Virginia Tech	Receiving	Luke Reynolds	12 receptions, 107 yards, TD
Maryland	Passing	Malik Washington	30–43, 359 yards, 3 TD
Maryland	Rushing	Harry Dalton III	6 carries, 26 yards
Maryland	Receiving	Chris Durr Jr.	12 receptions, 109 yards, 2 TD

=== at Boston College ===
Virginia Tech Hokies (3–0) at Boston College Eagles (2–1) – Game summary

Quarter	1	2	3	4	Total
Hokies	0	3	3	15	21
Eagles	0	0	7	7	14

at Alumni Stadium • Chestnut Hill, Massachusetts

- Date: September 26
- Game time: 12:00 p.m. EDT
- Game weather: Rain • Temperature: 60 °F (16 °C) • Wind: NE at 39 miles per hour (63 km/h)
- Game attendance: 22,624
- Referee: Jon Noli
- TV announcers (ACCN): Wes Durham, Max Browne, and Madison Fitzpatrick

Game information

First quarter

No scoring plays

Second quarter

- (00:16) VT – John Love 45-yard field goal (Drive: 13 plays, 48 yards, 2:29; Hokies 3–0)

Third quarter

- (11:58) VT – John Love 22-yard field goal (Drive: 4 plays, 6 yards, 1:30; Hokies 6–0)
- (09:52) BC – Mason McKenzie 5-yard run, Luca Lombardo kick (Drive: 5 plays, 75 yards, 2:06; Eagles 7–6)

Fourth quarter

- (11:09) BC – Mason McKenzie 2-yard run, Luca Lombardo kick (Drive: 9 plays, 67 yards, 5:04; Eagles 14–6)
- (08:05) VT – Marlion Jackson 14-yard pass from Ethan Grunkemeyer, Jeffrey Overton Jr. rush (Drive: 10 plays, 80 yards, 2:58; Tied 14-14)
- (04:58) VT – Jeffrey Overton Jr. 76-yard run, John Love kick (Drive: 1 play, 76 yards, 0:12; Hokies 21–14)

Statistics	VT	BC
First downs	23	13
Plays–yards	77–370	61–261
Rushes–yards	42–223	38–150
Passing yards	147	111
Passing: comp–att–int	22–35–0	11–23–0
Time of possession	28:40	31:20

Team	Category	Player	Statistics
Virginia Tech	Passing	Ethan Grunkemeyer	22/35, 147 yards, TD
Virginia Tech	Rushing	Jeffrey Overton Jr.	25 carries, 209 yards, TD
Virginia Tech	Receiving	Que'Sean Brown	8 receptions, 51 yards
Boston College	Passing	Mason McKenzie	11/23, 111 yards
Boston College	Rushing	Mason McKenzie	26 carries, 138 yards, 2 TD
Boston College	Receiving	Jaedn Skeete	2 receptions, 27 yards

=== vs. Pittsburgh ===
Pittsburgh Panthers (4–0) at Virginia Tech Hokies (4–0) – Game summary

Quarter	1	2	3	4	Total
Panthers	7	14	7	7	35
Hokies	14	10	0	9	33

at Lane Stadium • Blacksburg, Virginia

- Date: October 2
- Game time: 7:00 p.m. EDT
- Game weather: Rain • Temperature: 75 °F (24 °C) • Wind: W at 7 miles per hour (11 km/h)
- Game attendance: 65,632
- Referee: Nate Black
- TV announcers (ESPN): Mike Monaco, Jordan Rodgers, and Dana Boyle

Statistics	PITT	VT
First downs	18	21
Plays–yards	61–295	73–499
Rushes–yards	31–104	32–65
Passing yards	191	434
Passing: comp–att–int	18–30–0	30–41–2
Turnovers	0	4
Time of possession	28:38	31:22

Team	Category	Player	Statistics
Pittsburgh	Passing	Mason Heintschel	10/18, 113 yards, TD
Pittsburgh	Rushing	Ja'Kyrian Turner	14 carries, 65 yards
Pittsburgh	Receiving	Cataurus Hicks	3 receptions, 63 yards, 2 TD
Virginia Tech	Passing	Ethan Grunkemeyer	30/41, 434 yards, TD, 2 INT
Virginia Tech	Rushing	Jeffrey Overton Jr.	17 carries, 46 yards
Virginia Tech	Receiving	Que'Sean Brown	7 receptions, 147 yards, TD

=== at California ===
Virginia Tech Hokies (4–1) at California Golden Bears (2–3) – Game summary

Quarter	1	2	3	4	Total
Hokies	0	14	0	6	20
Golden Bears	0	10	3	12	25

at California Memorial Stadium • Berkeley, California

- Date: October 10
- Game time: 12:35 PDT
- Game weather: Sunny • Temperature: 63 °F • Wind: SW at 11 miles per hour
- Game attendance: 40,170
- Referee: Tim Hedgepeth
- TV announcers (ACC Network): Justin Kutcher, Max Browne, and Madison Fitzpatrick

Statistics	VT	CAL
First downs	25	24
Plays–yards	63–401	69–403
Rushes–yards	32–113	26–82
Passing yards	288	321
Passing: comp–att–int	21–31–0	29–43–0
Turnovers	0	0
Time of possession	29:43	30:17

Team	Category	Player	Statistics
Virginia Tech	Passing	Ethan Grunkemeyer	21/31, 288 yards, TD
Virginia Tech	Rushing	Jeffrey Overton Jr.	12 carries, 73 yards
Virginia Tech	Receiving	Que'Sean Brown	7 receptions, 63 yards
California	Passing	Jackson Brousseau	29/43, 321 yards, TD
California	Rushing	Ashten Emory	19 carries, 46 yards, 2 TD
California	Receiving	Ian Strong	5 receptions, 97 yards

=== vs. Georgia Tech (rivalry) ===
Georgia Tech Yellow Jackets (2–3) at Virginia Tech Hokies (4–2) – Game summary

Quarter	1	2	3	4	Total
Yellow Jackets	0	3	14	7	24
Hokies	14	10	7	3	34

at Lane Stadium • Blacksburg, Virginia

- Date: October 17
- Game time: 3:30 p.m. EDT
- Game weather: Cloudy • Temperature: 54 °F (12 °C) • Wind: N at 4 miles per hour (6.4 km/h)
- Game attendance: 65,632
- Referee: Justin Elliott
- TV announcers (ACC Network): Wes Durham (play-by-play), Max Browne (analyst), and Madison Fitzpatrick (sideline)

Statistics	GT	VT
First downs	21	19
Plays–yards	59–428	62–409
Rushes–yards	21–93	40–159
Passing yards	335	250
Passing: comp–att–int	29–38–1	15–22–0
Turnovers	2	1
Time of possession	27:54	32:06

Team	Category	Player	Statistics
Georgia Tech	Passing	Alberto Mendoza	29/38, 335 yards, 2 TD, INT
Georgia Tech	Rushing	Trelain Maddox	12 carries, 96 yards, TD
Georgia Tech	Receiving	Jordan Allen	10 receptions, 120 yards
Virginia Tech	Passing	Ethan Grunkemeyer	15/22, 250 yards, 3 TD
Virginia Tech	Rushing	Jeffrey Overton Jr.	14 carries, 85 yards
Virginia Tech	Receiving	Que'Sean Brown	6 receptions, 182 yards, TD

=== at Clemson ===
Virginia Tech Hokies (5–2) at Clemson Tigers (4–2) – Game summary

Quarter	1	2	3	4	Total
Hokies	3	7	0	10	20
Tigers	0	3	13	0	16

at Memorial Stadium • Clemson, South Carolina

- Date: October 24
- Game time: 7:00 p.m. EDT
- Game weather: Clear • Temperature: 59 °F (15 °C) • Wind: NE 5 mph
- Game attendance: 80,510
- Referee: Mike Roche
- TV announcers: (ESPN): Roy Philpott, Brock Osweiler, and Sherree Burruss

Game information

First quarter

- (1:20) VT – John Love 37-yard field goal (Drive: 13 plays, 46 yards, 6:23; Hokies 3–0)

Second quarter

- (12:21) CL – Nolan Hauser 34-yd field goal (Drive: 10 plays, 59 yards, 3:59; Tied 3–3)
- (01:24) VT - Luke Reynolds 6-yd pass from Ethan Grunkemeyer (John Love kick ) (Drive: 17 plays, 87 yards, 7:00; Hokies 10–3)

Third quarter

- (13:44) CL - Nolan Hauser 49-yd field goal (Drive: 9 plays, 44 yards, 4:16; Hokies 10–6)
- (6:14) CL - Tait Reynolds 16-yd run (Nolan Hauser kick), (Drive: 6 plays, 65 yards, 2:30; Clemson 13–10)
- (0:03) CL - Nolan Hauser 36-yd field goal (Drive: 7 plays, 37 yards, 3:43; Clemson 16–10)

Fourth quarter

- (11:52) VT - John Love 47-yd field goal (Drive: 8 plays, 46 yards, 3:11; Clemson 16–13)
- (1:44) VT - Luke Reynolds 5-yd pass from Ethan Grunkemeyer (John Love kick) (Drive: 11 plays, 69 yards, 4:45; Hokies 20–16)

Statistics	VT	CLEM
First downs	19	15
Plays–yards	70–234	62–288
Rushes–yards	37–70	3–:135
Passing yards	164	153
Passing: comp–att–int	21–33–0	20–26–0
Time of possession	32:24	27:36

Team	Category	Player	Statistics
Virginia Tech	Passing	Ethan Grunkemyer	20/32, 156 yards, 2 TD
Virginia Tech	Rushing	Jeffrey Overton Jr.	10 carries, 26 yards
Virginia Tech	Receiving	Luke Reynolds	7 receptions, 44 yards, 2 TD
Clemson	Passing	Tait Reynolds	20/26, 153 yards
Clemson	Rushing	Tait Reynolds	18 carries, 63 yards, TD
Clemson	Receiving	Tyler Brown	8 receptions, 62 yards

=== at SMU ===
Virginia Tech Hokies (6–2) at SMU Mustangs (6–2) – Game summary

Quarter	1	2	3	4	Total
Hokies	0	0	0	0	0
Mustangs	0	0	0	0	0

at Gerald J. Ford Stadium • University Park, Texas

- Date: November 6
- Game time: 7:00 p.m. EST
- TV announcers (ESPN): Mike Monaco, Jordan Rodgers, and Dana Boyle

Statistics	VT	SMU
First downs		
Plays–yards		
Rushes–yards		
Passing yards		
Passing: comp–att–int		
Time of possession		

Team	Category	Player	Statistics
Virginia Tech	Passing		
Virginia Tech	Rushing		
Virginia Tech	Receiving		
SMU	Passing		
SMU	Rushing		
SMU	Receiving		

=== vs. Stanford ===
Stanford Cardinal (4–5) at Virginia Tech Hokies (6–3) – Game summary

Quarter	1	2	3	4	Total
Cardinal	0	0	0	0	0
Hokies	0	0	0	0	0

at Lane Stadium • Blacksburg, Virginia

- Date: November 14
- Game time: TBD
- TV announcers (ACCN): Wes Durham, Max Browne, and Madison Fitzpatrick

Statistics	STAN	VT
First downs		
Plays–yards		
Rushes–yards		
Passing yards		
Passing: comp–att–int		
Time of possession		

Team	Category	Player	Statistics
Stanford	Passing		
Stanford	Rushing		
Stanford	Receiving		
Virginia Tech	Passing		
Virginia Tech	Rushing		
Virginia Tech	Receiving		

=== at No. 7 Miami (FL) (rivalry) ===
Virginia Tech Hokies (6–4) at No. 7 Miami Hurricanes (9–1) – Game summary

Quarter	1	2	3	4	Total
Hokies	0	0	0	0	0
No. 7 Hurricanes	0	0	0	0	0

at Hard Rock Stadium • Miami Gardens, Florida

- Date: November 21
- Game time: TBD
- TV announcers (ESPN): Tom Hart, Roddy Jones, and Quint Kessenich

Statistics	VT	MIA
First downs		
Plays–yards		
Rushes–yards		
Passing yards		
Passing: comp–att–int		
Time of possession		

Team	Category	Player	Statistics
Virginia Tech	Passing		
Virginia Tech	Rushing		
Virginia Tech	Receiving		
Miami (FL)	Passing		
Miami (FL)	Rushing		
Miami (FL)	Receiving		

=== vs. Virginia (Commonwealth Cup) ===
Virginia Cavaliers (6–5) at Virginia Tech Hokies (6–5) – Game summary

Quarter	1	2	3	4	Total
Cavaliers	0	0	0	0	0
Hokies	0	0	0	0	0

at Lane Stadium • Blacksburg, Virginia

- Date: November 28
- Game time: TBD

Statistics	UVA	VT
First downs		
Plays–yards		
Rushes–yards		
Passing yards		
Passing: comp–att–int		
Time of possession		

Team	Category	Player	Statistics
Virginia	Passing		
Virginia	Rushing		
Virginia	Receiving		
Virginia Tech	Passing		
Virginia Tech	Rushing		
Virginia Tech	Receiving		

== Personnel ==
=== Roster ===
2026 Virginia Tech Hokies football team roster
Players
Coaches
Offense

Pos.	#	Name	Class
WR	0	Ayden Greene	Sr
WR	2	Takye Heath	Jr
WR	3	Que'Sean Brown	Jr
WR	5	Marlion Jackson	Sr
WR	6	Keylen Adams	So
WR	7	Chanz Wiggins	So
QB	12	Kelden Ryan	Fr
TE	13	Ja'Ricous Hairston	Jr
QB	14	Troy Huhn	Fr
WR	15	Shamarius Peterkin	So
RB	16	Jeffrey Overton Jr.	Fr
QB	17	Ethan Grunkemeyer	So
QB	18	A. J. Brand	Fr
WR	19	Tyseer Denmark	So
WR	20	Jeff Exinor Jr.	Fr
QB	22	Bryce Baker	Fr
RB	23	Tyler Mason	So
RB	26	Messiah Mickens	Fr
RB	27	Marcellous Hawkins	Sr
WR	28	Drew Hube	Fr
RB	32	Bill Davis	Jr
RB	35	John Buetow	So
TE	36	Brody Jones	Jr
TE	44	Matt Henderson	Fr
RB	46	Darius Taylor	Jr
RB	49	Gray Peterson	So
OL	50	Nathaniel Wright	Fr
OL	51	Elijah Haughawout	So
OL	53	Tommy Ricard	So
OL	54	Michael Troutman III	Fr
OL	56	Layth Ghannan	Jr
OL	57	Lucas Austin	So
OL	58	Roseby Lubintus	Fr
OL	61	Justin Bell	Fr
OL	62	Kyle Altuner	So
OL	65	Tyrell Simpson	Fr
OL	66	Montavious Cunningham	GS
OL	70	Logna Howland	Jr
OL	71	Gavin Crawford	Fr
OL	72	Justin Terry	So
OL	74	Marlen Bright	Fr
OL	75	Benjamin Eziuka	Fr
OL	76	Aidan Lynch	So
OL	77	Brody Meadows	Sr
OL	79	Johnny Garrett	Sr
WR	80	L.J. Booker	Fr
WR	81	Israel Hairston	So
TE	82	Benji Gosnell	Sr
WR	83	Luke Stuewe	Fr
TE	85	Luke Reynolds	Jr
WR	86	Joseph Hobbs	Fr
TE	87	Harrison Saint Germain	Sr
TE	99	Cole Reemsnyder	Sr

Defense

Pos.	#	Name	Class
S	0	Quinton Reddish	So
CB	2	Jaquez White	Sr
LB	3	Kaleb Spencer	Sr
CB	5	Joshua Clarke	So
S	6	Jordan Bass	Sr
S	7	Sherrod Covil	Sr
CB	9	Isaiah Brown-Murray	Sr
S	11	Tyson Flowers	Sr
LB	12	Gabe Williams	So
DL	13	Kemari Copeland	Sr
S	14	Sheldon Robinson	So
S	15	Brennan Johnson	So
LB	16	Noah Chambers	So
CB	18	Amauri Polydor	Fr
LB	19	Mathieu Lamah	Fr
CB	20	Cam Chadwick Jr.	Jr
CB	22	Kenny Woseley Hr.	So
CB	23	Thomas Williams	Jr
S	24	Tyrell Grant Jr.	Fr
LB	26	Antwone Santiago	Sr
S	28	Knahlij Harrell	So
CB	29	Jahmari DeLoatch	Fr
LB	30	Curtis Jones Jr.	Jr
DL	31	Jason Abbey	Jr
DL	32	Deric Dandy	So
LB	33	Keon Wylie	Jr
DL	34	Cortez Harris	Fr
CB	35	Jojo Crim	So
DL	36	Randy Adirika	Fr
DL	37	Mylachi Williams	So
LB	38	John-Patrick Oates	Fr
LB	39	Terry Wiggins	Fr
DL	40	Javion Hilson	Fr
LB	41	George Ballance	Jr
DL	42	Aycen Stevens	Jr
DB	43	Josh Jones	So
DL	44	Brett Clatterbaugh	Fr
DL	45	Eric Mensah	So
CB	47	Daniel "Danny" Garvin	Fr
DL	51	Samuel Okunlola	Sr
DL	52	Sherrod Henderson	Fr
DL	54	Grant Karczewski	Jr
DL	55	Gerard Johnson	So
DL	56	Daniel Jennings	Fr
DL	58	Zeke Chinwike	Fr
DL	63	Kamren Johnson	Fr
DL	88	Christian Evans	Fr
DL	90	Andrew Hanchuk	So
DL	91	Garrett Witherington	Fr
DL	94	Elhadj Fall	Sr
DL	95	T-Ron Richardson Jr.	Fr
DL	99	Emmett Laws	So

Special teams

Pos.	#	Name	Class
K	17	John Love	Sr
LS	49	Deed Capper	So
K	92	Aidan Daugherty	So
P, K	93	Cole Byrd	Fr
P	95	Nathan Totten	Jr
LS	96	Christian Epling	Sr
K	98	Will Love	Fr

Head coach

- James Franklin

Coordinators/assistant coaches

- Norval McKenzie
  Assistant head coach/run game coordinator/running backs
- Brent Pry
  Defensive coordinator/linebackers
- Ty Howle
  Offensive coordinator/tight ends
- Doug Shearer
  Special teams coordinator
- Vic Hall
  Defensive recruiting coordinator/nickels
- Anthony Midget
  Pass game coordinator/safeties
- Fontel Mines
  Offensive recruiting coordinator/wide receivers
- Matt Moore
  Offensive line
- Danny O'Brien
  Quarterbacks
- Nick Perry
  Cornerbacks
- Sean Spencer
  Run game coordinator/defensive line
- Chuck Losey
  Assistant athletics director for athletic performance - football
- Ryan Alexander
  Assistant offensive line
- Arketa Banks
  Assistant running backs
- Josh Conklin
  Senior defensive analyst
- Brian Crist
  Senior offensive analyst for defense
- Jens Danielsen
  Assistant offensive line
- Brayden DeVault-Smith
  Assistant cornerbacks
- Jeff Earls
  Assistant director of athletic performance - football
- Jarrett Ferguson
  Assistant director of athletic performance - football
- Jon Fleury
  Assistant director of athletic performance - football
- Alvin Futrell
  Associate director of athletic performance - football
- Jeron Gouveia-Winslow
  Assistant safeties
- Jan Johnson Jr.
  Assistant linebackers
- Mike Moyseenko
  Assistant quarterbacks
- Cam Phillips
  Assistant wide receivers
- Danny Rocco
  Senior defensive analyst for offense
- David Rocco
  Associate tight ends
- Warren Ruggiero
  Senior offensive analyst
- Pat Shepard
  Assistant special teams
- Derrick Tangelo
  Assistant defensive line
- Greg Wood
  Assistant special teams

Legend

- (C) Team captain
- (S) Suspended
- (I) Ineligible
- Injured
- Redshirt

Roster
Last update: June 25, 2026

=== Transfers ===
Rankings and Stats by 247 Sports

Outgoing Player	Pos	Rk	Ht	Wt	Destination
Carter Stallard	IOL	87	6'8	335	Murray State Racers
Hannes Hammer	OT	84	6'6	272	UConn Huskies
Tucker Holloway	WR	86	6'2	177	Florida Atlantic Owls
Micah Matthews	WR	86	6'2	200	James Madison Dukes
Cam Seldon	WR	86	6'1.5	215	South Florida Bulls
Isaiah Spencer	WR	86	6'2	185	Ole Miss Rebels
Devin Alves	WR	83	6'2	180	Hawaii Rainbow Warriors
Charlie O'Connor	WR	NR	6'1	186	San Diego Toreros
Jeremiah Coney	RB	85	6'1	190	Stony Brook Seawolves
Braydon Bennett	RB	84	6'1	180	Eastern Michigan Eagles
Pop Watson III	QB	85	6'1	177	UMass Minutemen
Garret Rangel	QB	84	6'2	198	UT Rio Grande Valley Vaqueros
Zeke Wimbush	TE	83	6'2	215	Liberty Flames
Drew Doyle	LS	NR	6'1	242	Western Michigan Broncos
James Jennette	DL	86	6'4	210	Utah State Aggies
Arias Nash	DL	85	6'1	275	Tulsa Golden Hurricane
Jahzari Priester	DL	83	6'8	250	North Texas Mean Green
Will Johnson	LB	87	6'2	220	TBD
Noah Jenkins	LB	86	6'2	205	TBD
Michael Short	LB	86	6'3	218	TCU Horned Frogs
Caleb Woodson	LB	86	6'3	238	Alabama Crimson Tide
James Djonkam	LB	79	6'4	250	TBD
Krystian Williams	CB	87	6'0	180	Richmond Spiders
Dante Lovett Jr.	CB	86	6'0	195	UCLA Bruins
Joseph Reddish	CB	86	6'0	190	Appalachian State Mountaineers
Caleb Brown	CB	85	6'1	160	Hawaii Rainbow Warriors
Christian Ellis	SF	86	6'0	180	Virginia Cavaliers
Keyshawn Burgos	EDGE	85	6'5	235	Purdue

Incoming Player	Pos	Rk	Ht	Wt	Yr	#	Previous school
Michael Troutman III	IOL	86	6'2	316	rFr	54	Penn State
Logan Howland	OT	86	6'6	325	rJr	70	Oklahoma
Justin Terry	OT	86	6'5	358	rSo	72	Ohio State
Justin Bell	OT	85	6'6	327	rFr	61	Michigan State
Que'Sean Brown	WR	93	5'7	165	rJr	3	Duke
Jeff Exinor	WR	87	6'1	220	rFr	20	Penn State
Tyseer Denmark	WR	86	5'10	185	rSo	19	Penn State
Marlion Jackson	WR	85	6'2	205	rSr	5	Louisiana Tech
Bill Davis	RB	85	5'9	230	rJr	32	Louisiana
Ethan Grunkemeyer	QB	93	6'2	207	rSo	17	Penn State
Bryce Baker	QB	87	6'2.25	200	rFr	22	North Carolina
Luke Reynolds	TE	92	6'4	250	Jr	85	Penn State
Matt Henderson	TE	86	6'5	243	rFr	44	Penn State
Deed Capper	LS	80	6'2	223	rSo	49	Wisconsin
Nathan Totten	P	84	6'1	231	rJr	95	Marshall
Javion Hilson	DL	87	6'3	245	rFr	40	Missouri
Daniel Jennings	DL	87	6'1	248	rFr	56	Penn State
Randy Adirika	DL	86	6'2	316	rFr	36	Penn State
Cortez Harris	DL	86	6'2	247	rFr	34	Penn State
Eric Mensah	DL	86	6'2	322	rSo	45	Ohio State
Samuel Okunlola	DL	86	6'3	249	rSr	51	Colorado
Mylachi Williams	DL	86	6'3	253	rSo	37	Penn State
Keon Wylie	LB	89	6'2	225	rJr	33	Penn State
Curtis Jones	LB	86	6'2	210	Jr	30	West Virginia
Jaquez White	CB	86	6'1	190	Sr	2	Troy
Kenny Woseley	CB	85	5'10	180	rSo	22	Penn State
Cam Chadwick	CB	84	5'11	170	rJr	20	UConn

=== 2027 NFL draft ===
Round	Pick	Player	Position	NFL team
		TBD		
