= 2026 Clemson Tigers football team =

American college football season

2026 Clemson Tigers football
- Conference: Atlantic Coast Conference
- Record: 7–4 (5–3 ACC)
- Head coach: Dabo Swinney (18th full; 19th overall season)
- Offensive coordinator: Chad Morris (Note: Morris previously served as offensive coordinator from 2011-2014.) (5th season)
- Co-offensive coordinators: Kyle Richardson (2nd season); Matt Luke (3rd season)
- Offensive scheme: Power spread
- Defensive coordinator: Tom Allen (2nd season)
- Co-defensive coordinator: Nick Eason (2nd season)
- Base defense: 4–2–5
- Home stadium: Memorial Stadium

Uniform
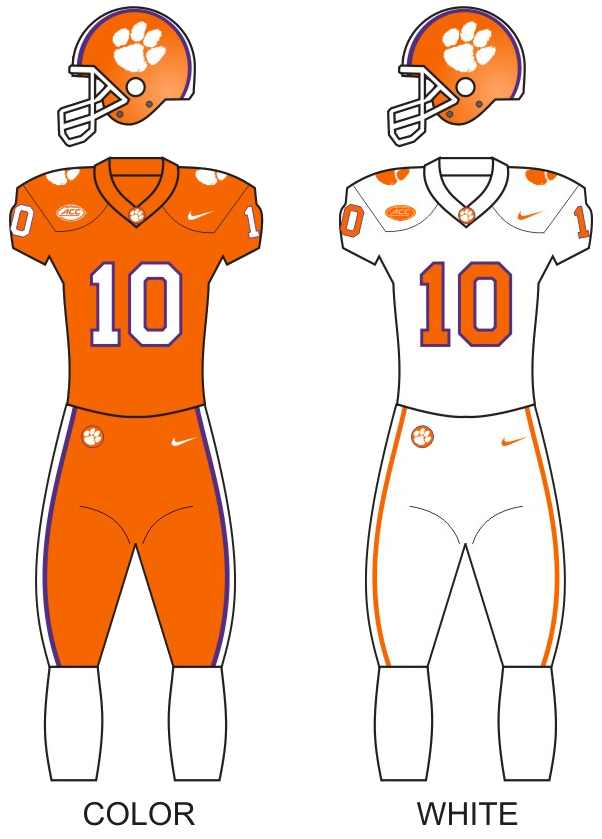

2026 Atlantic Coast Conference football standings
	Conf.			Overall
Team	W		L	W		L
No. 7 Miami (FL) y	8	–	0	10	–	1
No. 11 Wake Forest y	7	–	1	10	–	1
No. 23 Louisville	7	–	2	8	–	3
Clemson	5	–	3	7	–	4
SMU	5	–	3	7	–	4
Duke	4	–	4	7	–	4
Stanford	4	–	4	6	–	5
Virginia	4	–	4	6	–	5
Boston College	3	–	4	5	–	6
Pittsburgh	3	–	5	6	–	5
Virginia Tech	3	–	5	6	–	5
NC State	3	–	5	5	–	6
Florida State	3	–	5	5	–	6
Syracuse	3	–	6	5	–	6
North Carolina	2	–	5	5	–	6
California	2	–	6	3	–	8
Georgia Tech	2	–	6	3	–	8
Championship: Miami (FL) vs. Wake Forest
^ – College Football Playoff participant; $ – Conference champion; y – Championship game participant; As of November 22, 2026; Rankings from CFP rankings

The 2026 Clemson Tigers football team represents Clemson University as a member of the Atlantic Coast Conference (ACC) during the 2026 NCAA Division I FBS football season. The Tigers are led by Dabo Swinney, in his 19th year and 18th full season as Clemson's head coach. The Tigers play their home games at Memorial Stadium located in Clemson, South Carolina

== Schedule ==
Date	Time	Opponent	Site	TV	Result	Attendance
September 5	9:40 p.m. (Note: Start time delayed from 7:30 p.m. due to thunderstorms.)	at No. 11 LSU*	Tiger Stadium; Baton Rouge, LA (College GameDay)	ABC	L 10–51	102,321
September 12	9:30 p.m. (Note: Start time delayed from 7:30 p.m. due to thunderstorms.)	Georgia Southern*	Memorial Stadium; Clemson, SC	ACCN	W 22–7	81,150
September 19	12:00 p.m.	North Carolina	Memorial Stadium; Clemson, SC (ACC Huddle)	ESPN	W 28–20	78,332
September 25	10:30 p.m.	at California	California Memorial Stadium; Berkeley, CA	ESPN	W 24–10	41,778
October 3	7:30 p.m.	No. 4 Miami (FL)	Memorial Stadium; Clemson, SC (ACC Huddle)	ABC	L 13–41	80,463
October 17	12:00 p.m.	Charleston Southern*	Memorial Stadium; Clemson, SC	ACCN	W 37–0	75,917
October 24	7:00 p.m.	Virginia Tech^{†}	Memorial Stadium; Clemson, SC	ESPN	L 16–20	80,510
October 31	7:00 p.m.	at Florida State	Doak Campbell Stadium; Tallahassee, FL (rivalry)	ACCN	W 36–24	60,472
November 7	12:00 p.m.	at Syracuse	JMA Wireless Dome; Syracuse, NY	ESPN2	W 18–13	37,291
November 14	12:30 p.m.	Georgia Tech	Memorial Stadium; Clemson, SC (rivalry)	The CW	L 6–20	76,701
November 20	7:30 p.m.	at Duke	Wallace Wade Stadium; Durham, NC	ESPN	W 20–10	25,311
November 28	3:00 p.m.	South Carolina*	Memorial Stadium; Clemson, SC (Palmetto Bowl)	ESPN2		
*Non-conference game; ^{†}Homecoming; Rankings from AP Poll (and CFP Rankings, after November 3) – Released prior to game; All times are in Eastern time

== Rankings ==
Ranking movements Legend: ██ Increase in ranking ██ Decrease in ranking — = Not ranked RV = Received votes
	Week															
Poll	Pre	1	2	3	4	5	6	7	8	9	10	11	12	13	14	Final
AP	RV	—	—	—	—	—	—	—	—	—	—	—				
Coaches	23	RV	RV	RV	RV	—	—	—	—	—	—	—				
CFP	Not released									—	—	—				Not released

== Game summaries ==
=== at No. 11 LSU ===
Clemson Tigers (0–0) at No. 11 LSU Tigers (0–0) – Game summary

Quarter	1	2	3	4	Total
Clemson	3	0	0	7	10
No. 11 LSU	17	14	13	7	51

at Tiger Stadium • Baton Rouge, Louisiana

- Date: September 5
- Game time: 7:30 p.m.
- Game weather: Cloudy • Temperature: 78 °F (26 °C) • Wind: NW at 3 mph
- Game attendance: 102,321
- Referee: Jerry Magallanes
- TV announcers (ABC): Chris Fowler (play-by-play), Kirk Herbstreit (analyst), Holly Rowe and Laura Rutledge (sideline reporters)

Game information

First quarter

- CLEM – Nolan Hauser 49-yard field goal, 13:28. Clemson 3–0. Drive: 4 plays, 2 yards, 1:02.
- LSU – Scott Starzyk 49-yard field goal, 10:16. Tied 3–3. Drive: 10 plays, 59 yards, 3:06.
- LSU – Dilin Jones 1-yard run (Scott Starzyk kick), 3:36. LSU 10–3. Drive: 12 plays, 89 yards, 4:21.
- LSU – Jordan Ross 30-yard interception return (Scott Starzyk kick), 2:07. LSU 17–3.

Second quarter

- LSU – Sam Leavitt 8-yard run (Scott Starzyk kick), 7:54. LSU 24–3. Drive: 9 plays, 72 yards, 3:35.
- LSU – Sam Leavitt 13-yard run (Scott Starzyk kick), 1:10. LSU 31–3. Drive: 8 plays, 51 yards, 1:36.

Third quarter

- LSU – Winston Watkins Jr. 32-yard pass from Sam Leavitt (Scott Starzyk kick), 8:21. LSU 38–3. Drive: 9 plays, 69 yards, 4:13.
- LSU – Dilin Jones 12-yard run (pass failed), 3:24. LSU 44–3. Drive: 6 plays, 66 yards, 2:05.

Fourth quarter

- LSU – Phillip Wright III 30-yard pass from Landen Clark (Scott Starzyk kick), 6:43. LSU 51–3. Drive: 6 plays, 45 yards, 2:21.
- CLEM – David Eziomume 11-yard run (Nolan Hauser kick), 3:13. LSU 51–10. Drive: 8 plays, 71 yards, 3:25.

Statistics	CLEM	LSU
First downs	8	38
Plays–yards	48–145	94–644
Rushes–yards	26–40	58–309
Passing yards	105	335
Passing: comp–att–int	14–22–1	22–36–1
Turnovers	1	1
Time of possession	23:51	36:09

Team	Category	Player	Statistics
Clemson	Passing	Christopher Vizzina	10/16, 83 yards, INT
Clemson	Rushing	Jarvis Green	4 carries, 21 yards
Clemson	Receiving	T. J. Moore	4 receptions, 31 yards
LSU	Passing	Sam Leavitt	16/28, 230 yards, TD, INT
LSU	Rushing	Sam Leavitt	12 carries, 113 yards, 2 TD
LSU	Receiving	Winston Watkins Jr.	7 receptions, 110 yards, TD

=== vs Georgia Southern ===
Georgia Southern Eagles (0–0) at Clemson Tigers (0–0) – Game summary

Quarter	1	2	3	4	Total
Eagles	0	7	0	0	7
Tigers	7	9	0	6	22

at Memorial Stadium • Clemson, South Carolina

- Date: September 12
- Game time: 7:30 p.m.
- Game weather: Cloudy • Temperature: 75 °F (24 °C) • Wind: SW at 2 miles per hour (3.2 km/h)
- Game attendance: 81,150
- Referee: Darryl DeBerry
- TV announcers (ACCN): Wes Durham (play-by-play), Max Browne (analyst) and Madison Fitzpatrick (sideline reporter)

Game information

First quarter

- CLEM – T. J. Moore 10-yard pass from Christopher Vizzina (Nolan Hauser kick), 11:01. Clemson 7–0. Drive: 7 plays, 27 yards, 2:25.

Second quarter

- CLEM – Nolan Hauser 20-yard field goal, 14:57. Clemson 10–0. Drive: 6 plays, 15 yards, 2:46.
- CLEM – Nolan Hauser 34-yard field goal, 4:54. Clemson 13–0. Drive: 6 plays, 47 yards, 2:23.
- GASO – Ashton Hollins 42-yard pass from Max Johnson (Tripp Bryant kick), 3:03. Clemson 13–7. Drive: 6 plays, 75 yards, 1:51.
- CLEM – Nolan Hauser 38-yard field goal, 0:00. Clemson 16–7. Drive: 11 plays, 55 yards, 3:03.

Fourth quarter

- CLEM – Nolan Hauser 50-yard field goal, 6:26. Clemson 19–7. Drive: 7 plays, 33 yards, 3:19.
- CLEM – Nolan Hauser 49-yard field goal, 3:10. Clemson 22–7. Drive: 4 plays, 0 yards, 1:30.

Statistics	GASO	CLEM
First downs	14	22
Plays–yards	66–266	74–347
Rushes–yards	18–22	39–150
Passing yards	244	197
Passing: comp–att–int	27–48–0	20–35–1
Turnovers	1	2
Time of possession	28:18	31:42

Team	Category	Player	Statistics
Georgia Southern	Passing	Max Johnson	27/47, 244 yards, TD
Georgia Southern	Rushing	David Mbadinga	3 carries, 11 yards
Georgia Southern	Receiving	Ashton Hollins	5 receptions, 97 yards, TD
Clemson	Passing	Tait Reynolds	16/27, 178 yards
Clemson	Rushing	Gideon Davidson	14 carries, 62 yards
Clemson	Receiving	T. J. Moore	7 receptions, 103 yards, TD

=== vs North Carolina ===
North Carolina Tar Heels (2–0) at Clemson Tigers (1–1) – Game summary

Quarter	1	2	3	4	Total
Tar Heels	14	3	0	3	20
Tigers	3	3	9	13	28

at Memorial Stadium • Clemson, South Carolina

- Date: September 19
- Game time: 12:00 p.m.
- Game weather: Sunny
- Game attendance: 78,332
- Referee: Jon Noli
- TV announcers (ESPN): Bob Wischusen, Louis Riddick and Stormy Buonantony

Statistics	UNC	CLEM
First downs	20	20
Plays–yards	69–349	66–401
Rushes–yards	39–214	36–186
Passing yards	135	215
Passing: comp–att–int	13–30–1	20–30–1
Turnovers	2	2
Time of possession	33:32	26:28

Team	Category	Player	Statistics
North Carolina	Passing	Billy Edwards Jr.	13/30, 135 yards, TD, INT
North Carolina	Rushing	Benjamin Hall	18 carries, 130 yards
North Carolina	Receiving	Jordan Shipp	6 receptions, 68 yards
Clemson	Passing	Tait Reynolds	20/29, 215 yards, TD, INT
Clemson	Rushing	Gideon Davidson	16 carries, 105 yards, TD
Clemson	Receiving	T. J. Moore	7 receptions, 38 yards

=== at California ===
Clemson Tigers (2–1) at California Golden Bears (2–1) – Game summary

Quarter	1	2	3	4	Total
Tigers	0	10	7	7	24
Golden Bears	7	0	3	0	10

at California Memorial Stadium • Berkeley, California

- Date: September 25
- Game time: 10:30 p.m.
- Game weather: Sunny • Temperature: 65 °F (18 °C) • Wind: N at 4 miles per hour (6.4 km/h)
- Game attendance: 41,778
- Referee: Nate Black
- TV announcers (ESPN): Mike Monaco, Jordan Rodgers and Dana Boyle

Statistics	CLEM	CAL
First downs	23	13
Plays–yards	70–363	57–231
Rushes–yards	49–255	27–86
Passing yards	108	145
Passing: comp–att–int	13–21–1	17–30–2
Turnovers	2	2
Time of possession	34:07	25:53

Team	Category	Player	Statistics
Clemson	Passing	Tait Reynolds	13/21, 108 yards, INT
Clemson	Rushing	Gideon Davidson	22 carries, 159 yards, 2 TD
Clemson	Receiving	Tyler Brown	3 receptions, 29 yards
California	Passing	Jaron-Keawe Sagapolutele	16/29, 119 yards, 2 INT
California	Rushing	Adam Mohammed	13 carries, 51 yards
California	Receiving	Chase Hendricks	4 receptions, 37 yards

=== vs No. 4 Miami (FL) ===
No. 4 Miami Hurricanes (4–0) at Clemson Tigers (3–1) – Game summary

Quarter	1	2	3	4	Total
No. 4 Hurricanes	10	7	7	17	41
Tigers	3	3	0	7	13

at Memorial Stadium • Clemson, South Carolina

- Date: October 3
- Game time: 7:30 p.m.
- Game weather: Cloudy • Temperature: 76 °F (24 °C) • Wind: S at 4 miles per hour (6.4 km/h)
- Game attendance: 80,463
- Referee: Justin Elliott
- TV announcers (ABC): Chris Fowler, Kirk Herbstreit, and Holly Rowe

Statistics	MIA	CLEM
First downs	25	22
Plays–yards	62–419	75–350
Rushes–yards	35–192	31–55
Passing yards	227	295
Passing: comp–att–int	18–27–0	29–44–1
Turnovers	0	2
Time of possession	32:29	27:31

Team	Category	Player	Statistics
Miami (FL)	Passing	Darian Mensah	18/27, 227 yards, TD
Miami (FL)	Rushing	Mark Fletcher Jr.	16 carries, 77 yards, 2 TD
Miami (FL)	Receiving	Cooper Barkate	5 receptions, 98 yards, TD
Clemson	Passing	Tait Reynolds	29/44, 295 yards, INT
Clemson	Rushing	Chris Johnson Jr.	5 carries, 32 yards
Clemson	Receiving	Tyler Brown	10 receptions, 76 yards

=== vs Charleston Southern (FCS) ===
Charleston Southern Buccaneers (3–3) at Clemson Tigers (3–2) – Game summary

Quarter	1	2	3	4	Total
Buccaneers (FCS)	0	0	0	0	0
Tigers	10	24	0	3	37

at Memorial Stadium • Clemson, South Carolina

- Date: October 17
- Game time: 12:00 p.m.
- Game weather: Sunny • Temperature: 62 °F (17 °C) • Wind: N at 13 miles per hour (21 km/h)
- Game attendance: 75,917
- Referee: Nate Black
- TV announcers (ACCN): Roxy Bernstein (play-by-play), Dave Clawson (analyst) and Madison Hock (sideline)

Statistics	CHSO	CLEM
First downs	6	28
Plays–yards	45–76	86–438
Rushes–yards	32–1	46–231
Passing yards	50	207
Passing: comp–att–int	7–13–0	26–40–2
Turnovers	1	2
Time of possession	28:04	31:56

Team	Category	Player	Statistics
Charleston Southern	Passing	Jared Echols	7/12, 50 yards
Charleston Southern	Rushing	Hakeem Watters	13 carries, 46 yards
Charleston Southern	Receiving	Maxwell Warren	5 receptions, 38 yards
Clemson	Passing	Tait Reynolds	17/26, 127 yards
Clemson	Rushing	Gideon Davidson	13 carries, 59 yards, TD
Clemson	Receiving	Christian Bentancur	4 receptions, 74 yards

=== vs Virginia Tech ===
Virginia Tech Hokies (5–2) at Clemson Tigers (4–2) – Game summary

Quarter	1	2	3	4	Total
Hokies	3	7	0	10	20
Tigers	0	3	13	0	16

at Memorial Stadium • Clemson, South Carolina

- Date: October 24
- Game time: 7:00 p.m.
- Game attendance: 80,510
- TV announcers (ESPN): Roy Philpott (play-by-play), Brock Osweiler (analyst) and Sherree Burruss (sideline)

Statistics	VT	CLEM
First downs	19	15
Plays–yards	70–234	62–288
Rushes–yards	37–70	36–135
Passing yards	164	153
Passing: comp–att–int	21–33–0	20–26–0
Time of possession	32:24	27:36

Team	Category	Player	Statistics
Virginia Tech	Passing	Ethan Grunkemeyer	20/32, 156 yards, 2 TD
Virginia Tech	Rushing	Jeffrey Overton Jr.	10 carries, 26 yards
Virginia Tech	Receiving	Que'Sean Brown	5 receptions, 69 yards
Clemson	Passing	Tait Reynolds	20/26, 153 yards
Clemson	Rushing	Tait Reynolds	18 carries, 63 yards, 1 TD
Clemson	Receiving	Tyler Brown	8 receptions, 62 yards

=== at Florida State (rivalry) ===
Clemson Tigers (4–3) at Florida State Seminoles (3–4) – Game summary

Quarter	1	2	3	4	Total
Tigers	10	13	3	10	36
Seminoles	7	3	0	14	24

at Doak Campbell Stadium • Tallahassee, Florida

- Date: October 31
- Game time: 7:00 p.m.
- Game attendance: 60,472
- TV: ACCN

Statistics	CLEM	FSU
First downs	19	21
Plays–yards	76–351	62–415
Rushes–yards	44–162	29–65
Passing yards	189	350
Passing: comp–att–int	18–32–0	21–33–3
Time of possession	34:11	25:49

Team	Category	Player	Statistics
Clemson	Passing	Tait Reynolds	18/32, 189 yards, 2 TD
Clemson	Rushing	Tait Reynolds	14 carries, 85 yards, 1 TD
Clemson	Receiving	Tyler Brown	5 receptions, 74 yards
Florida State	Passing	Ashton Daniels	21/33, 350 yards, 2 TD, 3 INT
Florida State	Rushing	Quintrevion Wisner	13 carries, 43 yards
Florida State	Receiving	Micahi Danzy	4 receptions, 108 yards, 1 TD

=== at Syracuse ===
Clemson Tigers (5–3) at Syracuse Orange (4–4) – Game summary

Quarter	1	2	3	4	Total
Tigers	6	3	9	0	18
Orange	3	3	0	7	13

at JMA Wireless Dome • Syracuse, New York

- Date: November 7
- Game time: 12:00 p.m.
- Game attendance: 37,291
- TV: ESPN2

Statistics	CLEM	SYR
First downs	16	20
Plays–yards	63–359	73–380
Rushes–yards	34–162	33–117
Passing yards	197	263
Passing: comp–att–int	18–29–1	18–40–1
Time of possession	32:29	27:31

Team	Category	Player	Statistics
Clemson	Passing	Tait Reynolds	17/28, 161 yards, 1 INT
Clemson	Rushing	Jarvis Green	9 carries, 85 yards
Clemson	Receiving	Bryant Wesco Jr.	6 receptions, 100 yards
Syracuse	Passing	Steve Angeli	18/40, 263 yards, 1 TD, 1 INT
Syracuse	Rushing	Ahmad Miller	20 carries, 101 yards
Syracuse	Receiving	Justus Ross-Simmons	4 receptions, 84 yards

=== vs Georgia Tech (rivalry) ===
Georgia Tech Yellow Jackets (2–7) at Clemson Tigers (6–3) – Game summary

Quarter	1	2	3	4	Total
Yellow Jackets	7	6	7	0	20
Tigers	0	3	3	0	6

at Memorial Stadium • Clemson, South Carolina

- Date: November 14
- Game time: 12:30 p.m.
- Game attendance: 76,701
- TV: CW

Statistics	GT	CLEM
First downs	18	14
Plays–yards	67–407	68–228
Rushes–yards	52–269	34–86
Passing yards	138	142
Passing: comp–att–int	8–15–1	15–34–1
Time of possession	33:00	27:00

Team	Category	Player	Statistics
Georgia Tech	Passing	Alberto Mendoza	8/14, 138 yards, 1 INT
Georgia Tech	Rushing	Justice Haynes	13 carries, 116 yards, 1 TD
Georgia Tech	Receiving	Jordan Allen	2 receptions, 61 yards
Clemson	Passing	Christopher Vizzina	12/27, 133 yards, 1 INT
Clemson	Rushing	Jarvis Green	13 carries, 39 yards
Clemson	Receiving	Juju Preston	4 receptions, 56 yards

=== at Duke ===
Clemson Tigers (6–4) at Duke Blue Devils (7–3) – Game summary

Quarter	1	2	Total
Tigers			0
Blue Devils			0

at Wallace Wade Stadium • Durham, North Carolina

- Date: November 21
- Game time: 7:30 p.m.
- TV announcers (ESPN): TBD

Statistics	CLEM	DUKE
First downs		
Plays–yards		
Rushes–yards		
Passing yards		
Passing: comp–att–int		
Time of possession		

Team	Category	Player	Statistics
Clemson	Passing		
Clemson	Rushing		
Clemson	Receiving		
Duke	Passing		
Duke	Rushing		
Duke	Receiving		

=== vs South Carolina (Palmetto Bowl) ===
South Carolina Gamecocks (6–5) at Clemson Tigers (7–4) – Game summary

Quarter	1	2	Total
Gamecocks			0
Tigers			0

at Memorial Stadium • Clemson, South Carolina

- Date: November 28
- Game time: TBD

Statistics	SC	CLEM
First downs		
Plays–yards		
Rushes–yards		
Passing yards		
Passing: comp–att–int		
Time of possession		

Team	Category	Player	Statistics
South Carolina	Passing		
South Carolina	Rushing		
South Carolina	Receiving		
Clemson	Passing		
Clemson	Rushing		
Clemson	Receiving		

== Personnel ==
=== Coaching staff ===
Clemson Tigers football current coaching staff
Name	Position	Alma mater	Years at Clemson
Dabo Swinney	Head coach	University of Alabama (1993)	19th
Nick Eason	Associate head coach/co-defensive coordinator/defensive tackles coach	Clemson University (2001)	5th
Matt Luke	Assistant head coach/co-offensive coordinator/offensive linemen coach	Ole Miss (1998)	3rd
Mike Reed	Assistant head coach/cornerbacks coach	Boston College (1994)	14th
Tom Allen	Assistant coach/defensive coordinator/linebackers coach	Maranatha Baptist University (1992)	2nd
Chad Morris	Assistant coach/offensive coordinator	Texas A&M University (1992)	5th
Ben Boulware	Assistant coach/linebackers coach	Clemson University (2017)	2nd
Tyler Grisham	Assistant coach/offensive pass game coordinator/wide receivers coach	Clemson University (2009)	7th
Kyle Richardson	Assistant coach/co-offensive coordinator/tight ends coach	Appalachian State University (2001)	11th
Tajh Boyd	Assistant coach/quarterbacks coach	Clemson University (2013)	6th
Chris Rumph	Assistant coach/defensive run game coordinator/defensive ends coach	University of South Carolina (1996)	3rd
C. J. Spiller	Assistant coach/offensive run game coordinator/running backs coach	Clemson University (2009)	6th
Nolan Turner	Assistant coach/safeties coach	Clemson University (2020)	3rd
Corico Wright	Assistant coach/nickelbacks coach	Clemson University (2012)	4th

=== Roster ===
As of May 31, 2026

2026 Clemson Tigers Football
Quarterbacks: 2 Tait Reynolds – freshman (6'2, 215); 5 Brock Bradley – freshman (6'0, 180); 14 Trent Pearman – (redshirt) senior (6'0, 195); 15 Chris Denson – (redshirt) freshman (6'2, 195); 17 Christopher Vizzina – (redshirt) junior (6'4, 210); Running backs: 8 Gideon Davidson – sophomore (6'0, 200); 16 Chris Johnson Jr. – (redshirt) junior (6'0, 185); 21 Jarvis Green – (redshirt) sophomore (5'9, 200); 23 Peyton Streko – (redshirt) sophomore (5'10, 190); 24 David Eziomume – (redshirt) sophomore (6'0, 215); 26 Jay Haynes – (redshirt) sophomore (5'11, 195); 34 Max Wilson – (redshirt) sophomore (5'10, 200); Wide receivers: 0 Naeem Burroughs – freshman (5'11, 180); 1 T. J. Moore – junior (6'3, 205); 6 Tyler Brown – (redshirt) junior (5'11, 185); 10 Misun Kelley – WR/DB – (redshirt) junior (5'9, 185); 10 Juju Preston – (redshirt) freshman (6'0, 155); 12 Bryant Wesco – junior (6'2, 190); 13 Connor Salmin – freshman (6'1, 190); 19 Gordon Sellars III – freshman (6'3, 175); 20 Clark Sanderson – (redshirt) sophomore (5'9, 175); 22 Cole Turner – (redshirt) junior (6'1, 185); 27 Jack Purkerson – (redshirt) senior (5'7, 160); 29 Chase Byrd – (redshirt) sophomore (5'10, 185); 80 Luke Stubbs – (redshirt) senior (6'2, 205); 82 Sam Earle – (redshirt) sophomore (5'10, 165); 84 Avery Wieting – (redshirt) sophomore (5'9, 175); 86 Jaylen Brown–Wallace – (redshirt) junior (6'2, 175); 88 Clay Swinney – (redshirt) senior (5'10, 175); Cam Blivens – freshman (6'2, 175); Keil McGriff – freshman (5'11, 175); Tight ends: 7 Logan Brooking – (redshirt) freshman (6'4, 235); 11 Olsen Patt-Henry – senior (6'3, 240); 85 Charlie Johnson – (redshirt) junior (6'4, 240); 87 Christian Bentancur – (redshirt) sophomore (6'4, 245); Tayveon Wilson – freshman (6'2, 205); Placekickers: 38 Robert Gunn III – PK/P – (redshirt) senior (6'0, 180); 48 Charlie Reed – PK/P – (redshirt) sophomore (6'2, 205); 81 Nolan Hauser – junior (6'1, 195)	Offensive linemen: 50 Collin Sadler – (redshirt) senior (6'6, 310); 51 Gavin Blanchard – (redshirt) freshman (6'2, 295); 52 Elyjah Thurmon – (redshirt) sophomore (6'4, 325); 54 Ian Reed – (redshirt) sophomore (6'6, 300); 55 Harris Sewell – senior (6'4, 310); 56 Watson Young – (redshirt) freshman (6'3, 280); 59 Dietrick Pennington – graduate student (6'5, 355); 62 Bryce Smith – (redshirt) junior (6'3, 285); 63 Easton Ware – (redshirt) freshman (6'5, 315); 64 Grant Wise – freshman (6'4, 300); 67 Carlito Jones – (redshirt) junior (6'8, 270); 70 Chance Barclay – freshman (6'4, 290); 71 Leo Delaney – freshman (6'5, 275); 73 Hayes Galloway – (redshirt) junior (6'4, 320); 74 Brayden Jacobs – sophomore (6'7, 355); 75 Tucker Kattus – (redshirt) freshman (6'5, 310); 76 Mason Wade – (redshirt) sophomore (6'5, 310); 77 Ronan O'Connell – (redshirt) sophomore (6'5, 310); 78 Carter Scruggs – freshman (6'5, 290); 79 Braden Wilmes – freshman (6'8, 270); 94 Chapman Pendergrass – (redshirt) senior (6'3, 295); Adam Guthrie – freshman (6'7, 280); Defensive backs: 32 Tyler Conner – (redshirt) junior (5'11, 190); Defensive ends: 13 Will Heldt – senior (6'6, 260); 14 London Merritt – sophomore (6'3, 250); 15 Jahiem Lawson – (redshirt) senior (6'2, 255); 17 Ari Watford – (redshirt) freshman (6'5, 245); 23 C.J. Wesley – (redshirt) senior (6'2, 240); 34 Armon Mason – graduate student (6'3, 235); 49 Darien Mayo – (redshirt) sophomore (6'7, 270); Michael Foster – freshman (6'2, 235); J.R. Hardrick – freshman (6'6, 230); Defensive tackles: 29 Champ Thompson – (redshirt) sophomore (6'3, 290); 33 Caden Story – (redshirt) senior (6'3, 275); 42 Hevin Brown-Shuler – (redshirt) sophomore (6'3, 315); 44 Kourtney Kelly – (redshirt) sophomore (6'3, 280); 45 Vic Burley – (redshirt) junior (6'4, 320); 54 Kam Cody – freshman (6'3, 280); 55 Makhi Williams-Lee – (redshirt) freshman (6'2, 295); 95 Amare Adams – sophomore (6'4, 310); 97 Patrick Swygert – (redshirt) junior (6'5, 270); 99 Markus Strong – (redshirt) junior (6'3, 295); Andy Burburija – junior (6'2, 295); Devarrick Woods – (redshirt) senior (6'3, 290); Long snappers: 46 Jackson Reach – freshman (6'2, 215)	Linebackers: 7 Jeremiah Alexander – (redshirt) senior (6'2, 235); 9 Drew Woodaz – (redshirt) sophomore (6'2, 220); 21 Kobe McCloud – (redshirt) junior (5'11, 225); 24 Logan Anderson – (redshirt) freshman (6'2, 225); 26 C.J. Kubah-Taylor – (redshirt) sophomore (6'2, 225); 38 Dominic Staten – (redshirt) freshman (5'9, 230); 43 Billy Wilkes – (redshirt) freshman (6'1, 215); 47 Sammy Brown – junior (6'2, 235); 50 Fletcher Cothran – (redshirt) senior (6'3, 225); 53 Joseph Roberto II – (redshirt) sophomore (6'2, 225); Brayden Reilly – freshman (6'3, 205); Cornerbacks: 0 Donovan Starr – sophomore (5'11, 180); 1 Branden Strozier – (redshirt) junior (6'1, 185); 2 Ashton Hampton – junior (6'2, 200); 3 Elliot Washington II – senior (5'11, 200); 8 Corian Gipson – (redshirt) sophomore (6'1, 190); 12 Shavar Young Jr. – freshman (5'11, 175); 16 Myles Oliver – (redshirt) senior (5'11, 180); 25 Marcell Gipson Jr. – freshman (5'10, 160); Safeties: 5 Ronan Hanafin – senior (6'3, 215); 6 Jerome Carter III – junior (6'1, 190); 11 Polo Anderson – freshman (6'2, 180); 18 Kylon Griffin – (redshirt) senior (5'11, 200); 20 Jakarrion Kenan – (redshirt) freshman (6'1, 190); 22 Corey Myrick – junior (6'3, 200); 27 Noah Dixon – (redshirt) sophomore (6'1, 195); 30 Kylen Webb – (redshirt) junior (6'0, 200); 31 Joe Wilkinson – (redshirt) sophomore (6'1, 195); Punters: 40 Brodey Conn – P/S – (redshirt) junior (6'1, 200); 89 Jack Smith – (redshirt) senior (6'5, 240)

== Offseason ==
=== Recruiting ===
Clemson's 2026 class consisted of 22 signees. The class was ranked fourth in the ACC and twentieth best overall by the 247Sports Composite.

College recruiting (2026)
Name	Hometown	School	Height	Weight	Commit date
Polo Anderson; S	Roebuck, South Carolina	Dorman	6 ft 2 in (1.88 m)	190 lb (86 kg)	May 16, 2025
Polo Anderson; S	Recruit ratings: Rivals: 247Sports: ESPN: (83)				
Chance Barclay; IOL	Orlando, Florida	The First Academy	6 ft 3.5 in (1.92 m)	285 lb (129 kg)	Mar 9, 2025
Chance Barclay; IOL	Recruit ratings: Rivals: 247Sports: ESPN: (81)				
Cam Blivens; WR	Nashville, Tennessee	Lipscomb Academy	6 ft 2 in (1.88 m)	175 lb (79 kg)	Jan 20, 2026
Cam Blivens; WR	Recruit ratings: 247Sports: ESPN: (74)				
Brock Bradley; QB	Hoover, Alabama	Spain Park	6 ft 0 in (1.83 m)	185 lb (84 kg)	Aug 21, 2024
Brock Bradley; QB	Recruit ratings: Rivals: 247Sports: ESPN: (74)				
Andy Burburija; DL	Crystal Lake, Illinois	Iowa Western CC	6 ft 2 in (1.88 m)	290 lb (130 kg)	Jan 19, 2026
Andy Burburija; DL	Recruit ratings: 247Sports: ESPN: (74)				
Naeem Burroughs; WR	Jacksonville, Florida	The Bolles School	5 ft 11.5 in (1.82 m)	175 lb (79 kg)	Mar 8, 2025
Naeem Burroughs; WR	Recruit ratings: Rivals: 247Sports: ESPN: (83)				
Kam Cody; DL	Savannah, Georgia	Benedictine Military School	6 ft 2 in (1.88 m)	285 lb (129 kg)	Mar 29, 2025
Kam Cody; DL	Recruit ratings: Rivals: 247Sports: ESPN: (79)				
Leo Delaney; IOL	Charlotte, North Carolina	Providence Day School	6 ft 6 in (1.98 m)	290 lb (130 kg)	Jun 4, 2025
Leo Delaney; IOL	Recruit ratings: Rivals: 247Sports: ESPN: (81)				
Michael Foster; EDGE	Fort Mill, South Carolina	Indian Land	6 ft 3 in (1.91 m)	230 lb (100 kg)	Dec 3, 2025
Michael Foster; EDGE	Recruit ratings: 247Sports: ESPN: (76)				
Marcell Gipson Jr. CB	Dallas, Texas	South Oak Cliff	5 ft 10.5 in (1.79 m)	170 lb (77 kg)	Mar 10, 2025
Marcell Gipson Jr. CB	Recruit ratings: Rivals: 247Sports: ESPN: (76)				
Adam Guthrie; OT	Washington Court House, Ohio	Miami Trace	6 ft 7 in (2.01 m)	285 lb (129 kg)	Mar 7, 2025
Adam Guthrie; OT	Recruit ratings: Rivals: 247Sports: ESPN: (80)				
JR Hardrick; EDGE	South Pittsburg, Tennessee	South Pittsburg	6 ft 6 in (1.98 m)	231 lb (105 kg)	Jun 5, 2025
JR Hardrick; EDGE	Recruit ratings: Rivals: 247Sports: ESPN: (78)				
Jackson Reach; LS	Manhattan Beach, California	Mira Costa	6 ft 2 in (1.88 m)	220 lb (100 kg)	Sep 20, 2025
Jackson Reach; LS	Recruit ratings: 247Sports: ESPN: (68)				
Brayden Reilly; LB	Cincinnati, Ohio	St. Xavier	6 ft 3 in (1.91 m)	200 lb (91 kg)	Oct 24, 2025
Brayden Reilly; LB	Recruit ratings: 247Sports: ESPN: (78)				
Tait Reynolds; QB	Queen Creek, Arizona	Queen Creek	6 ft 1.5 in (1.87 m)	220 lb (100 kg)	Jul 7, 2024
Tait Reynolds; QB	Recruit ratings: Rivals: 247Sports: ESPN: (80)				
Connor Salmin; WR	Potomac, Maryland	Bullis School	6 ft 1 in (1.85 m)	195 lb (88 kg)	Mar 8, 2025
Connor Salmin; WR	Recruit ratings: Rivals: 247Sports: ESPN: (82)				
Carter Scruggs; IOL	Leesburg, Virginia	Loudoun County	6 ft 5 in (1.96 m)	280 lb (130 kg)	Jun 5, 2025
Carter Scruggs; IOL	Recruit ratings: Rivals: 247Sports: ESPN: (81)				
Gordon Sellars III; WR	Charlotte, North Carolina	Providence Day School	6 ft 2 in (1.88 m)	180 lb (82 kg)	Apr 18, 2025
Gordon Sellars III; WR	Recruit ratings: Rivals: 247Sports: ESPN: (82)				
Braden Wilmes; OT	Lawrence, Kansas	Lawrence Free State High School	6 ft 8 in (2.03 m)	280 lb (130 kg)	Dec 2, 2024
Braden Wilmes; OT	Recruit ratings: Rivals: 247Sports: ESPN: (79)				
Tayveon Wilson; TE	Huntington, West Virginia	Huntington	6 ft 3 in (1.91 m)	205 lb (93 kg)	Nov 21, 2024
Tayveon Wilson; TE	Recruit ratings: Rivals: 247Sports: ESPN: (80)				
Grant Wise; IOL	Milton, Florida	Pace	6 ft 3 in (1.91 m)	320 lb (150 kg)	Mar 9, 2025
Grant Wise; IOL	Recruit ratings: Rivals: 247Sports: ESPN: (81)				
Shavar Young Jr. CB	Knoxville, Tennessee	Webb School of Knoxville	5 ft 11 in (1.80 m)	180 lb (82 kg)	Aug 2, 2024
Shavar Young Jr. CB	Recruit ratings: Rivals: 247Sports: ESPN: (78)				
Overall recruit ranking: Rivals: 4 247Sports: 25
Note: In many cases, Scout, Rivals, 247Sports, On3, and ESPN may conflict in their listings of height and weight.; In these cases, the average was taken. ESPN grades are on a 100-point scale.; Sources: "Rivals commits". Rivals.; "ESPN commits". ESPN.; "2026 Team Ranking". Rivals.com.; "247Sports commits". 247Sports.

=== Players leaving for NFL ===
==== NFL draftees ====
Round	Pick	Player	Position	NFL club
1	17	Blake Miller	OT	Detroit Lions
1	29	Peter Woods	DT	Kansas City Chiefs
2	35	T. J. Parker	DE	Buffalo Bills
2	48	Avieon Terrell	CB	Atlanta Falcons
3	71	Antonio Williams	WR	Washington Commanders
4	110	Cade Klubnik	QB	New York Jets
4	123	Wade Woodaz	LB	Houston Texans
5	155	DeMonte Capehart	DT	Tampa Bay Buccaneers
5	174	Adam Randall	RB	Baltimore Ravens

==== Undrafted free agents ====
Player	Position	NFL club	Reference
Tristan Leigh	OT	Minnesota Vikings	
Jeadyn Lukus	CB	Tennessee Titans	
Cade Denhoff	DE	Buffalo Bills	
Philip Florenzo	LS	Atlanta Falcons	

=== Transfers ===
==== Players leaving ====
Players leaving
Name	Number	Pos.	Height	Weight	Year	Hometown	College transferred to	Source(s)
Jamal Anderson	0	LB	6'3	225	Junior	Buford, GA	SMU	
Shelton Lewis	2	CB	5'11"	185	Junior	Stockbridge, GA	Arkansas	
Josh Sapp	5	TE	6'2"	235	(redshirt) Junior	Greenville, SC	West Virginia	
Ricardo Jones	6	S	6'2"	195	Sophomore	Warner Robins, GA	Vanderbilt	
Khalil Barnes	7	S	6'0"	200	Junior	Athens, GA	Georgia	
Parker Fulghum	13	WR	6'0"	205	(redshirt) Freshman	Shreveport, LA	Louisiana–Monroe	
Robert Billings	14	S	6'2"	205	(redshirt) Sophomore	Marietta, GA	Jacksonville State	
Cade Trotter	16	QB	6'1"	190	(redshirt) Freshman	Dallas, TX	Arkansas	
Keith Adams Jr.	19	RB	5'9"	220	(redshirt) Junior	St. George, UT	Georgia State	
Dee Crayton	22	LB	6'2"	225	(redshirt) Sophomore	Alpharetta, GA	UNLV	
Michael Mankaka	29	CB	6'0"	190	(redshirt) Junior	Laurens, SC	Boston College	
Rowan Byrne	72	IOL	6'5"	295	Freshman	Bronxville, NY	North Carolina	
Markus Dixon	84	DE	6'4"	265	(redshirt) Sophomore	Philadelphia, PA	Oregon	
Stephiylan Green	90	DT	6'4"	290	(redshirt) Sophomore	Rome, GA	LSU	

==== Incoming transfers ====
Incoming transfers
Name	Number	Pos.	Height	Weight	Year	Hometown	Previous school	Source(s)
Donovan Starr	0	CB	5'11"	180	Sophomore	Bloomington, IL	Auburn	
Elliot Washington II	3	CB	5'11"	200	Senior	Sarasota, FL	Penn State	
Jerome Carter	6	S	6'1"	190	Junior	Lake City, FL	Old Dominion	
London Merritt	14	DE	6'3"	250	Sophomore	Atlanta, GA	Colorado	
Chris Johnson Jr.	16	RB	6'0"	185	(redshirt) Junior	Fort Lauderdale, FL	SMU	
Corey Myrick	22	S	6'3"	200	Junior	Cincinnati, OH	Southern Miss	
C.J. Wesley	23	DE	6'2"	240	(redshirt) Senior	West Orange, NJ	Howard	
Kourtney Kelly	44	DT	6'3"	280	(redshirt) Sophomore	Columbus, GA	West Georgia	
Carlito Jones	67	OL	6'8"	270	(redshirt) Junior	Anderson, SC	Clemson track and field	
Jaylen Brown-Wallace	86	WR	6'2"	175	(redshirt) Junior	Central, SC	Wingate	
Markus Strong	99	DT	6'3"	295	(redshirt) Junior	Raiford, FL	Oklahoma	
Devarrick Woods	--	DT	6'3"	290	(redshirt) Senior	Bossier City, LA	Texas State	
