= Trent Pearman =

American football player (born 2004)

No. 14 – Clemson Tigers
- Position: Quarterback
- Class: Redshirt Senior

Personal information
- Born: February 8, 2004 (age 22)
- Listed height: 6 ft 0 in (1.83 m)
- Listed weight: 190 lb (86 kg)

Career information
- High school: D. W. Daniel (Pickens County, South Carolina)
- College: Clemson (2022–present)
- Stats at ESPN

Trent Pearman is an American college football quarterback for the Clemson Tigers.

== Early life ==
Pearman attended D. W. Daniel High School in Pickens County, South Carolina, where he was a two-time state champion and a two-time South Carolina Gatorade Player of the Year. As a senior, Pearman completed 291 of 389 passes for 3,769 yards and 45 touchdowns, adding 306 yards and eight touchdowns on the ground. He committed to play college football for the Clemson Tigers as a preferred walk-on.

== College career ==
In his first four seasons at Clemson from 2022 to 2025, Pearman appeared in six games completing four of ten passes for 43 yards and an interception, adding 17 yards on the ground. Pearman made his first collegiate start in week 12 of the 2026 season after injuries to Tait Reynolds and Christopher Vizzina, completing 17 of 27 pass attempts for 164 yards, while also notching 51 yards and a touchdown on the ground in a 20-10 win over Duke.

== Personal life ==
Pearman is the son of Clemson Director of Scouting Danny Pearman.
