= 2026 Virginia Cavaliers football team =

American college football season

2026 Virginia Cavaliers football
- Conference: Atlantic Coast Conference
- Record: 6–5 (4–4 ACC)
- Head coach: Tony Elliott (5th season)
- Offensive coordinator: Desmond Kitchings (5th season)
- Offensive scheme: Spread
- Defensive coordinator: John Rudzinski (5th season)
- Base defense: Multiple 4–2–5
- Home stadium: Scott Stadium

2026 Atlantic Coast Conference football standings
	Conf.			Overall
Team	W		L	W		L
No. 7 Miami (FL) y	8	–	0	10	–	1
No. 11 Wake Forest y	7	–	1	10	–	1
No. 23 Louisville	7	–	2	8	–	3
Clemson	5	–	3	7	–	4
SMU	5	–	3	7	–	4
Duke	4	–	4	7	–	4
Stanford	4	–	4	6	–	5
Virginia	4	–	4	6	–	5
Boston College	3	–	4	5	–	6
Pittsburgh	3	–	5	6	–	5
Virginia Tech	3	–	5	6	–	5
NC State	3	–	5	5	–	6
Florida State	3	–	5	5	–	6
Syracuse	3	–	6	5	–	6
North Carolina	2	–	5	5	–	6
California	2	–	6	3	–	8
Georgia Tech	2	–	6	3	–	8
Championship: Miami (FL) vs. Wake Forest
^ – College Football Playoff participant; $ – Conference champion; y – Championship game participant; As of November 22, 2026; Rankings from CFP rankings

The 2026 Virginia Cavaliers football team represents the University of Virginia in the Atlantic Coast Conference (ACC) during the 2026 NCAA Division I FBS football season. The Cavaliers are led by Tony Elliott in his fifth year as head coach and play their home games at Scott Stadium in Charlottesville, Virginia.

== Schedule ==
Date	Time	Opponent	Rank	Site	TV	Result	Attendance
August 29	3:30 p.m.	NC State		Scott Stadium; Charlottesville, VA	ESPN	W 34–8	62,779
September 11	7:00 p.m.	Norfolk State*	No. 25	Scott Stadium; Charlottesville, VA	ACCNX	W 59–3	46,918
September 19	7:30 p.m.	vs. West Virginia*	No. 25	Bank of America Stadium; Charlotte, NC (Duke's Mayo Classic)	ACCN	L 27–38	39,377
September 26	6:00 p.m.	Delaware*		Scott Stadium; Charlottesville, VA	ACCN	W 42–3	41,935
October 3	3:30 p.m.	at Florida State		Doak Campbell Stadium; Tallahassee, FL (Jefferson–Eppes Trophy)	ESPN2	L 7–38	55,782
October 10	7:30 p.m.	Syracuse		Scott Stadium; Charlottesville, VA	ACCN	W 28–25	39,661
October 17	Noon	at No. 24 SMU		Gerald J. Ford Stadium; University Park, TX	The CW	L 13–23	28,713
October 23	7:00 p.m.	Duke		Scott Stadium; Charlottesville, VA (rivalry)	ESPN	L 16–19	45,138
October 31	3:45 p.m.	at No. 14 Wake Forest		Allegacy Federal Credit Union Stadium; Winston-Salem, NC	ESPN2	L 7–51	30,218
November 14	3:30 p.m.	California		Scott Stadium; Charlottesville, VA	ACCN	W 36–7	39,423
November 21	12:30 p.m.	North Carolina		Scott Stadium; Charlottesville, VA (South's Oldest Rivalry)	The CW	W 41–24	39,112
November 28	3:00 p.m.	at Virginia Tech		Lane Stadium; Blacksburg, VA (Commonwealth Cup)	The CW		
*Non-conference game; Rankings from AP Poll (and CFP Rankings, after November 3) – Released prior to game; All times are in Eastern time; Source:

== Rankings ==
Ranking movements Legend: ██ Increase in ranking ██ Decrease in ranking — = Not ranked RV = Received votes т = Tied with team above or below
	Week															
Poll	Pre	1	2	3	4	5	6	7	8	9	10	11	12	13	14	Final
AP	RV	25	25	—	—	—	—	—	—	—	—	—				
Coaches	RV	25т	25	—	RV	—	—	—	—	—	—	RV				
CFP	Not released									—	—	—				Not released

== Game summaries ==
=== vs. NC State ===
NC State Wolfpack (0–0) at Virginia Cavaliers (0–0) – Game summary

Quarter	1	2	3	4	Total
Wolfpack	0	0	8	0	8
Cavaliers	10	7	7	10	34

at Scott Stadium • Charlottesville, Virginia

- Date: August 29
- Game time: 3:30 EDT
- Game weather: Sunny • Temperature: 83 °F (28 °C) • Wind: SW 5 mph
- Game attendance: 62,779
- Referee: Nate Black
- TV announcers (ESPN): Wes Durham, Max Browne, and Madison Fitzpatrick

Game information

First quarter

- UVA – Will Bettridge 47-yard field goal, 5:11. Cavaliers 3–0. Drive: 7 plays, 31 yards, 3:47.
- UVA – Xavier Brown 1-yard run (Will Bettridge kick), 2:37. Cavaliers 10–0. Drive: 4 plays, 32 yards, 2:06.

Second quarter

- UVA – Xavier Brown 45-yard pass from Beau Pribula (Will Bettridge kick), 11:26. Cavaliers 17–0. Drive: 7 plays, 77 yards, 4:18.

Third quarter

- UVA – Da'Shawn Martin 47-yard pass from Beau Pribula (Will Bettridge kick), 13:35. Cavaliers 24–0. Drive: 3 plays, 75 yards, 1:25.
- NCSU – Will Wilson 1-yard run (CJ Bailey–Deandre Desinor pass), 4:59. Cavaliers 24–8. Drive: 9 plays, 60 yards, 5:24.

Fourth quarter

- UVA – Xay Davis 1-yard run (Will Bettridge kick), 7:44. Cavaliers 31–8. Drive: 23 plays, 75 yards, 12:15.
- UVA – Will Bettridge 42-yard field goal, 4:26. Cavaliers 34–8. Drive: 4 plays, 8 yards, 2:11.

Statistics	NCSU	UVA
First downs	10	18
Plays–yards	51–168	68–413
Rushes–yards	24–76	57–258
Passing yards	92	155
Passing: comp–att–int	15–27–1	9–11–0
Turnovers	2	0
Time of possession	21:56	38:04

Team	Category	Player	Statistics
NC State	Passing	CJ Bailey	12/23, 84 yards, INT
NC State	Rushing	CJ Bailey	10 carries, 33 yards
NC State	Receiving	Vander Ploog	2 receptions, 25 yards
Virginia	Passing	Beau Pribula	9/11, 155 yards, 2 TD
Virginia	Rushing	Beau Pribula	15 carries, 110 yards
Virginia	Receiving	Xavier Brown	2 receptions, 58 yards, TD

=== vs. Norfolk State (FCS) ===
Norfolk State Spartans (FCS) (1–1) at No. 25 Virginia Cavaliers (1–0) – Game summary

Quarter	1	2	3	4	Total
Spartans (FCS)	0	3	0	0	3
No. 25 Cavaliers	21	7	14	17	59

at Scott Stadium • Charlottesville, Virginia

- Date: September 11
- Game time: 7:00 p.m. EDT
- Game weather: Cloudy • Temperature: 75 °F (24 °C) • Wind: NE 6 mph
- Game attendance: 46,918
- Referee: Ron Hudson
- TV announcers (ACCNX): Doug Sherman and Forrest Conoly

Game information

First quarter

- UVA – Jacquon Gibson 6-yard pass from Beau Pribula (Will Bettridge kick), 7:39. Cavaliers 7–0. Drive: 7 plays, 37 yards, 2:57.
- UVA – Da'Shawn Martin 27-yard pass from Beau Pribula (Will Bettridge kick), 5:30. Cavaliers 14–0. Drive: 1 play, 22 yards, 0:27.
- UVA – Jacquon Gibson 30-yard pass from Beau Pribula (Will Bettridge kick), 3:12. Cavaliers 21–0. Drive: 3 plays, 66 yards, 0:59.

Second quarter

- NORF – Marco Peery 40-yard field goal, 4:05. Cavaliers 21–3. Drive: 5 plays, 15 yards, 2:16.
- UVA – Peyton Lewis 3-yard run (Will Bettridge kick), 1:04. Cavaliers 28–3. Drive: 7 plays, 80 yards, 2:54.

Third quarter

- UVA – Ty'Lyric Coleman 1-yard pass from Eli Holstein (Will Bettridge kick), 10:57. Cavaliers 35–3. Drive: 9 plays, 59 yards, 3:57.
- UVA – Isaiah Robinson 5-yard pass from Eli Holstein (Will Bettridge kick), 7:21. Cavaliers 42–3. Drive: 5 plays, 32 yards, 2:31.

Fourth quarter

- UVA – Hayden Rollison 12-yard pass from Cole Geer (Will Bettridge kick), 14:54. Cavaliers 49–3. Drive: 6 plays, 30 yards, 2:51.
- UVA – Will Bettridge 30-yard field goal, 7:23. Cavaliers 52–3. Drive: 9 plays, 55 yards, 4:09.
- UVA – Justin Rowe 50-yard interception returned (Chris Messmore kick), 4:17. Cavaliers 59–3. Drive: 6 plays, 19 yards, 3:06.

Statistics	NORF	UVA
First downs	11	25
Plays–yards	65–223	62–466
Rushes–yards	31–55	38–237
Passing yards	168	229
Passing: comp–att–int	18–34–3	18–24–1
Turnovers	3	1
Time of possession	31:46	28:14

Team	Category	Player	Statistics
Norfolk State	Passing	Deljay Bailey	15/25, 142 yards, 2 INT
Norfolk State	Rushing	Jalyn Daniels	6 carries, 22 yards
Norfolk State	Receiving	Elyjah Mitchell	5 receptions, 43 yards
Virginia	Passing	Beau Pribula	12/14, 162 yards, 3 TD, INT
Virginia	Rushing	Xay Davis	11 carries, 107 yards
Virginia	Receiving	Jacquon Gibson	2 receptions, 36 yards, 2 TD

=== vs. West Virginia ===
West Virginia Mountaineers (2–0) vs. No. 25 Virginia Cavaliers (2–0) – Game summary

Quarter	1	2	3	4	Total
Mountaineers	7	14	7	10	38
No. 25 Cavaliers	14	0	7	6	27

at Bank of America Stadium • Charlotte, North Carolina

- Date: September 19
- Game time: 7:30 p.m. EDT
- Game weather: Sunny • Temperature: 82 °F (28 °C) • Wind: W 5 mph
- Game attendance: 39,377
- Referee: Steven Robinson
- TV announcers (ACCN): Wes Durham, Max Browne, and Madison Fitzpatrick

Statistics	WVU	UVA
First downs	21	18
Plays–yards	68–437	70–354
Rushes–yards	51–247	37–157
Passing yards	190	197
Passing: comp–att–int	10–17–0	21–33–0
Turnovers	0	0
Time of possession	26:53	33:07

Team	Category	Player	Statistics
West Virginia	Passing	Michael Hawkins Jr.	10/17, 190 yards, 2 TD
West Virginia	Rushing	Michael Hawkins Jr.	18 carries, 129 yards, 3 TD
West Virginia	Receiving	DJ Epps	3 receptions, 92 yards, 2 TD
Virginia	Passing	Beau Pribula	21/33, 197 yards, 2 TD
Virginia	Rushing	Jekail Middlebrook	17 carries, 78 yards, TD
Virginia	Receiving	Xay Davis	3 receptions, 51 yards

=== vs. Delaware ===
Delaware Fightin' Blue Hens (2–1) at Virginia Cavaliers (2–1) – Game summary

Quarter	1	2	3	4	Total
Fightin' Blue Hens	0	3	0	0	3
Cavaliers	7	21	7	7	42

at Scott Stadium • Charlottesville, Virginia

- Date: September 26
- Game time: 6:00 p.m. EDT
- Game attendance: 41,935
- TV announcers (ACCN): Jorge Sedano, Rodney McLeod and Kendra Douglas

Statistics	DEL	UVA
First downs	12	33
Plays–yards	57–160	85–556
Rushes–yards	30–89	41–119
Passing yards	71	437
Passing: comp–att–int	7–27–2	33–44–0
Turnovers	2	1
Time of possession	23:49	36:11

Team	Category	Player	Statistics
Delaware	Passing	Riley Trujillo	1/3, 38 yards
Delaware	Rushing	Jo Silver	12 carries, 49 yards
Delaware	Receiving	Tae'Sean Robinson	1 catch, 38 yards
Virginia	Passing	Beau Pribula	24/28, 279 yards, 4 TD
Virginia	Rushing	Xay Davis	10 carries, 30 yards
Virginia	Receiving	Rico Flores Jr.	9 catches, 113 yards, TD

=== at Florida State ===
Virginia Cavaliers (3–1) at Florida State Seminoles (2–2) – Game summary

Quarter	1	2	3	4	Total
Cavaliers	7	0	0	0	7
Seminoles	0	17	14	7	38

at Doak Campbell Stadium • Tallahassee, Florida

- Date: October 3
- Game time: 3:30 p.m.
- Game weather: Cloudy • Temperature: 80 °F (27 °C) • Wind: 0 miles per hour (0 km/h)
- Game attendance: 55,782
- Referee: Riley Johnson
- TV announcers (ESPN2): Jay Alter, Tom Luginbill, and Lauren Sisler
- Box Score, Recap

Game information

First Quarter

- UVA - Da'Shawn Martin 13-yard pass from Beau Pribula (Will Bettridge kick), 6:04. Cavaliers 7–0. Drive: 7 plays, 63 yards, 3:17.

Second Quarter

- FSU - Ashton Daniels 4-yard run (Gabe Panikowski kick), 11:48. Tied 7–7. Drive: 8 plays, 98 yards, 3:43.
- FSU - Ashton Daniels 3-yard run (Gabe Panikowski kick), 5:58. Seminoles 14–7. Drive: 7 plays, 33 yards, 3:38.
- FSU - Gabe Panikowski 44-yard field goal, 1:01. Seminoles 17–7. Drive: 8 plays, 60 yards, 2:21.

Third Quarter

- FSU - Ashton Daniels 6-yard run (Gabe Panikowski kick), 7:47. Seminoles 24–7. Drive: 8 plays, 78 yards, 3:58.
- FSU - Ashton Daniels 81-yard run (Gabe Panikowski kick), 3:16. Seminoles 31–7. Drive: 2 plays, 81 yards, 0:16.

Fourth Quarter

- FSU - Ashton Daniels 1-yard run (Gabe Panikowski kick), 3:41. Seminoles 38–7. Drive: 8 plays, 47 yards, 5:15.

Statistics	UVA	FSU
First downs	19	22
Plays–yards	72–205	65–464
Rushes–yards	40–37	46–281
Passing yards	168	183
Passing: comp–att–int	14–32–0	12–19–1
Turnovers	0	1
Time of possession	28:09	31:51

Team	Category	Player	Statistics
Virginia	Passing	Beau Pribula	14/32, 168 yards, TD
Virginia	Rushing	Jekail Middlebrook	10 carries, 65 yards
Virginia	Receiving	Isaiah Robinson	2 receptions, 41 yards
Florida State	Passing	Ashton Daniels	12/19, 183 yards, INT
Florida State	Rushing	Ashton Daniels	17 carries, 136 yards, 5 TD
Florida State	Receiving	Micahi Danzy	4 receptions, 70 yards

=== vs. Syracuse ===
Syracuse Orange (2–2) at Virginia Cavaliers (3–2) – Game summary

Quarter	1	2	3	4	Total
Orange	7	10	0	8	25
Cavaliers	7	0	7	14	28

at Scott Stadium • Charlottesville, Virginia

- Date: October 10
- Game time: 7:30 p.m. EDT
- Game attendance: 39,661
- TV announcers (ACCN): Jorge Sedano, Dave Clawson, and Madison Hock

Statistics	SYR	UVA
First downs	25	18
Plays–yards	82–430	55–288
Rushes–yards	47–163	35–169
Passing yards	267	119
Passing: comp–att–int	18–35–0	11–20–0
Turnovers	0	0
Time of possession	35:02	24:58

Team	Category	Player	Statistics
Syracuse	Passing	Malachi Nelson	16/29, 217 yards, TD
Syracuse	Rushing	Tylik Hill	23 carries, 118 yards
Syracuse	Receiving	Umari Hatcher	8 catches, 126 yards, TD
Virginia	Passing	Beau Pribula	11/19, 119 yards, TD
Virginia	Rushing	Jekail Middlebrook	17 carries, 95 yards, 2 TD
Virginia	Receiving	Da'Shawn Martin	2 catches, 48 yards, TD

=== at No. 24 SMU ===
Virginia Cavaliers (4–2) at No. 24 SMU Mustangs (4–1) – Game summary

Quarter	1	2	3	4	Total
Cavaliers	0	0	0	0	0
No. 24 Mustangs	0	0	0	0	0

at Gerald J. Ford Stadium • University Park, Texas

- Date: October 17
- Game time: TBD
- TV announcers (The CW): Thom Brennaman, Jason Cabinda, and Wes Bryant

Statistics	UVA	SMU
First downs		
Plays–yards		
Rushes–yards		
Passing yards		
Passing: comp–att–int		
Turnovers		
Time of possession		

Team	Category	Player	Statistics
Virginia	Passing		
Virginia	Rushing		
Virginia	Receiving		
SMU	Passing		
SMU	Rushing		
SMU	Receiving		

=== vs. Duke (rivalry) ===
Duke Blue Devils (4–2) at Virginia Cavaliers (4–3) – Game summary

Quarter	1	2	3	4	Total
Blue Devils	0	0	0	0	0
Cavaliers	0	0	0	0	0

at Scott Stadium • Charlottesville, Virginia

- Date: October 23
- Game time: 7:00 p.m. EDT
- TV announcers (ESPN): Mike Monaco, Jordan Rodgers, and Dana Boyle

Statistics	DUKE	UVA
First downs		
Plays–yards		
Rushes–yards		
Passing yards		
Passing: comp–att–int		
Turnovers		
Time of possession		

Team	Category	Player	Statistics
Duke	Passing		
Duke	Rushing		
Duke	Receiving		
Virginia	Passing		
Virginia	Rushing		
Virginia	Receiving		

=== at No. 14 Wake Forest ===
Virginia Cavaliers (4–4) at No. 14 Wake Forest Demon Deacons (6–1) – Game summary

Quarter	1	2	3	4	Total
Cavaliers	0	0	0	0	0
No. 14 Demon Deacons	0	0	0	0	0

at Allegacy Federal Credit Union Stadium • Winston-Salem, North Carolina

- Date: October 31
- Game time: TBD
- TV announcers (ESPN2): Roy Philpott, Brock Osweiler, and Sherree Burress

Statistics	UVA	WAKE
First downs		
Plays–yards		
Rushes–yards		
Passing yards		
Passing: comp–att–int		
Turnovers		
Time of possession		

Team	Category	Player	Statistics
Virginia	Passing		
Virginia	Rushing		
Virginia	Receiving		
Wake Forest	Passing		
Wake Forest	Rushing		
Wake Forest	Receiving		

=== vs. California ===
California Golden Bears (3–6) at Virginia Cavaliers (4–5) – Game summary

Quarter	1	2	3	4	Total
Golden Bears	0	0	0	0	0
Cavaliers	0	0	0	0	0

at Scott Stadium • Charlottesville, Virginia

- Date: November 14
- Game time: TBD

Statistics	CAL	UVA
First downs		
Plays–yards		
Rushes–yards		
Passing yards		
Passing: comp–att–int		
Turnovers		
Time of possession		

Team	Category	Player	Statistics
California	Passing		
California	Rushing		
California	Receiving		
Virginia	Passing		
Virginia	Rushing		
Virginia	Receiving		

=== vs. North Carolina (South's Oldest Rivalry) ===
North Carolina Tar Heels (5–5) at Virginia Cavaliers (5–5) – Game summary

Quarter	1	2	3	4	Total
Tar Heels	0	0	0	0	0
Cavaliers	0	0	0	0	0

at Scott Stadium • Charlottesville, Virginia

- Date: November 21
- Game time: TBD

Statistics	UNC	UVA
First downs		
Plays–yards		
Rushes–yards		
Passing yards		
Passing: comp–att–int		
Turnovers		
Time of possession		

Team	Category	Player	Statistics
North Carolina	Passing		
North Carolina	Rushing		
North Carolina	Receiving		
Virginia	Passing		
Virginia	Rushing		
Virginia	Receiving		

=== at Virginia Tech (Commonwealth Cup) ===
Virginia Cavaliers (6–5) at Virginia Tech Hokies (6–5) – Game summary

Quarter	1	2	3	4	Total
Cavaliers	0	0	0	0	0
Hokies	0	0	0	0	0

at Lane Stadium • Blacksburg, Virginia

- Date: November 28
- Game time: TBD

Statistics	UVA	VT
First downs		
Plays–yards		
Rushes–yards		
Passing yards		
Passing: comp–att–int		
Turnovers		
Time of possession		

Team	Category	Player	Statistics
Virginia	Passing		
Virginia	Rushing		
Virginia	Receiving		
Virginia Tech	Passing		
Virginia Tech	Rushing		
Virginia Tech	Receiving		

== Roster ==
2026 Virginia Cavaliers football team roster
Players
Coaches
Offense

Pos.	#	Name	Class
RB	0	Xavier Brown	GS
RB	2	Peyton Lewis	Jr
RB	3	Noah Vaughn	Sr
WR	5	Kameron Courtney	Jr
QB	6	Cole Geer	So
QB	7	Beau Pribula	GS
WR	8	TyLyric Coleman	Sr
TE	9	Dakota Twitty (C)	GS
QB	10	Eli Holstein	Sr
WR	11	Rico Flores Jr.	GS
WR	13	Josiah Abdullah	So
QB	14	Boone Lourd	Jr
WR	15	Dillon Newton-Short	So
QB	16	Ely Hamrick	Fr
ATH	17	Jae'Oyn Williams	Fr
WR	18	Da'Shawn Martin	Jr
WR	19	Jacquon Gibson	GS
RB	21	Jekail Middlebrook	Sr
WR	22	Tyson Davis	GS
WR	23	Triston Ward	Jr
RB	25	Xay Davis	So
WR	26	Jack Rhodes	Fr
RB	28	Solomon Beebe	Jr
WR	29	CJ Spence	So
TE	30	Henry Omohundro	Jr
RB	37	Jack Stevens	So
WR	45	Brand Morgan	So
OL	51	Grayson Reid	So
OL	52	McKale Boley	GS
OL	54	Makilan Thomas	GS
OL	55	Jim Harris Jr.	So
OL	57	Luke Hatfield	Fr
OL	58	Noah Hartsoe	GS
OL	60	Drake Metcalf	GS
OL	61	Dane Steele	Sr
OL	64	Cole Surber	Sr
OL	65	Grant Ellinger	Jr
OL	66	Mikey Gildea	Fr
OL	66	Alex Reisig	Jr
OL	67	Will Rosen	Jr
C	69	Ryan Brubaker	GS
OL	70	Dane Wleklinski	Jr
OL	71	Monroe Mills	GS
OL	72	Ben York	Jr
OL	75	Dylan Biehl	Fr
OL	76	Alex Payne	So
G	77	Noah Josey (C)	GS
OL	79	Jon Adair	So
WR	80	Trevor Ladd	Jr
TE	81	TeKai Kirby	Sr
WR	82	DaMari Carter	Fr
TE	83	Willem Thurber	So
WR	84	Isaiah Robinson	So
WR	85	Dylan Cope	Fr
TE	86	Lukas Ungar	GS
TE	87	Justin Zames	So
TE	88	Connor Cox	Sr
TE	89	John Rogers	So
TE	94	Hayden Rollison	Sr

Defense

Pos.	#	Name	Class
CB	0	Ja'Maric Morris	GS
S	1	Montino Williams	So
DB	2	Donovan Platt	GS
CB	3	Kevon Gray	Jr
S	4	Corey Costner	So
LB	5	Kam Robinson	Sr
DB	6	Brandyn Hillman	Sr
CB	7	Josiah Persinger	So
S	8	Christian Ellis	GS
CB	9	Jam Jackson	GS
DB	10	Jacobie Henderson	GS
LB	11	Maddox Marcellus (C)	Sr
LB	13	Myles Brown	Jr
DE	14	Fisher Camac	Sr
DB	15	Lukas Sanker	So
LB	16	Matthew Fobbs-White	Sr
CB	17	Justin Ross	Jr
S	18	Jalen McNair	GS
DE	19	Evan Ward	So
CB	20	Omillio Agard	Jr
S	21	Keke Adams	Jr
CB	22	Isaiah Harris	Fr
S	23	Jaylen Jones	Sr
LB	25	Derek Uran	Fr
S	26	Caleb Hardy	Sr
DB	27	Alex Dunn	Fr
LB	28	Dallas Brannon	Fr
DB	29	Jayden Covil	Fr
S	30	Ethan Minter	Jr
DB	31	Patrick Campbell	GS
LB	32	Landon Danley	Sr
DE	33	Nnanna Anyanwu	GS
S	34	Kevin Chadwick Jr.	Sr
S	38	Armstrong Jones	Jr
LB	42	Isaiah Reese	So
DT	44	Darrion Henry-Young	GS
LB	45	Justin Rowe	So
DE	46	Chase Morrison	Jr
DE	47	Gabe Sneed	Sr
LB	49	Cayden Cook-Cash	Jr
DT	51	Sichan John	So
DE	53	Gavin Johnson	So
DL	54	Zion Wilson	GS
DT	55	Anthony Britton	Sr
DT	56	Tyler Simmons	Jr
DE	85	Jewett Hayes	Jr
DT	91	Jason Hammond	Sr
DT	92	Jonathan Allen	Sr
DE	93	Billy Koudelka	Jr
DE	94	Ezekiel Larry	GS
DT	96	Bull Richardson	Fr
DE	99	Devon Baxter	Jr

Special teams

Pos.	#	Name	Class
P	38	Daniel Sparks (C)	GS
K	41	Will Bettridge	GS
LS	49	Jacob Tannenbaum	So
LS	50	Wyatt Rubinoff	Jr
P, K	99	Elijah Slibeck	Sr

Head coach

- Tony Elliott

Coordinators/assistant coaches

- Des Kitchings – Offensive coordinator/ Tight ends
- John Rudzinski – Defensive coordinator
- Keith Gaither – Special teams coordinator/ Running backs
- Kevin Downing – Associate head coach/ Defensive tackles
- Mike Adams – Linebackers
- ShaDon Brown – Cornerbacks
- Curome Cox – Defensive passing game coordinator/ Safeties
- Taylor Lamb – Quarterbacks
- Adam Mims – Wide receivers
- Joey Orck – Offensive line
- Chris Slade – Defensive ends
- Jonathan Celestin – Assistant defensive backs coach
- Coy DeWeese – Assistant linebackers coach
- Mike Moore – Assistant defensive line coach
- Mike Hollins – Graduate assistant
- Jared Rayman – Graduate assistant

Legend

- (C) Team captain
- (S) Suspended
- (I) Ineligible
- Injured
- Redshirt

Roster
Last update: March 11, 2026
