= Riverdale Baptist School =

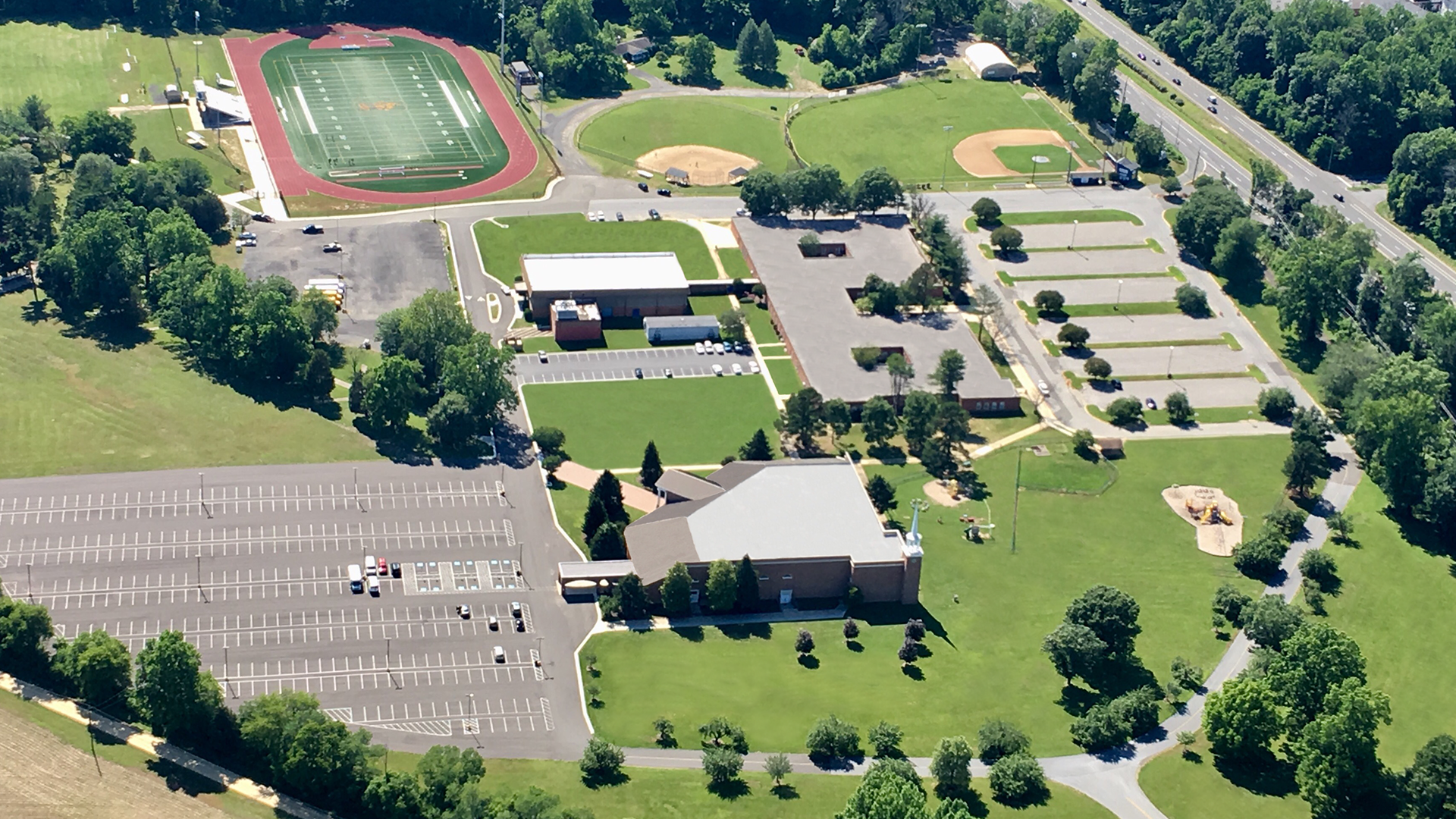

Location
- 1133 Largo Road; Upper Marlboro, Maryland; United States; 38°52′23″N 76°47′20″W

Information
- Type: Private Christian
- Religious affiliation: Independent Baptist
- Established: 1971
- Founder: Rev. R. Herbert Fitzpatrick
- Grades: K4-12
- Enrollment: averaging 300 total (co-ed)
- Average class size: 15
- Colors: Navy blue, gold
- Athletics: www.rbsathletics.org
- Accreditation: MSACS
- Website: www.rbschool.org

Riverdale Baptist School (RBS) is a private Christian school located in Upper Marlboro, Maryland, serving students from Pre-K to 12. It is located in Prince George's County, Maryland, and is accredited through Middle States Association of Colleges and Schools

== History ==
Riverdale Baptist School was founded in 1971 as a daughter ministry of Riverdale Baptist Church under the leadership of Reverend Fitzpatrick. In its first year, RBS had an enrollment of 188 students in kindergarten through sixth grade and was renting facilities from a local Catholic school. The school expanded by purchasing 156 acres of land on Largo Road in Upper Marlboro, Maryland, in 1974. The 70,000 square feet (1.6 acres) educational building opened in 1975 with the 2,100 seat church sanctuary following shortly thereafter. Over the years, RBS has added a basketball and volleyball gymnasium featuring a weight room and film room, baseball, and softball diamonds.

== Notable alumni ==
- Jabari Banks, actor best known for starring in Bel-Air
- Shakira Austin, WNBA Player, basketball center for the Israeli Elitzur Ramla
- Michael Beasley, Professional Basketball Player
- Tariq Castro-Fields, NFL Super Bowl Champion
- Kaila Charles, WNBA Player
- Christian Darrisaw, Professional Football Player
- Olandis Gary, Professional Football Player; Head Coach, RBS Football
- Cortez Harris, college football defensive end for the Virginia Tech Hokies
- Tianna Hawkins, WNBA Player
- John Hightower (American football), Professional Football Player
- Zion Johnson, Professional Football Player
- Jonquel Jones, WNBA Player & 2021 MVP, current power forward/center for New York Liberty
- Zech McPhearson, Professional Football Player
- Chinanu Onuaku, Basketball player
- Nolan Smith, Professional Basketball Player
- Wanisha Smith, WNBA Player
- Devin Sweetney, Professional Basketball Player
