= Zech McPhearson =

American football player (born 1998)

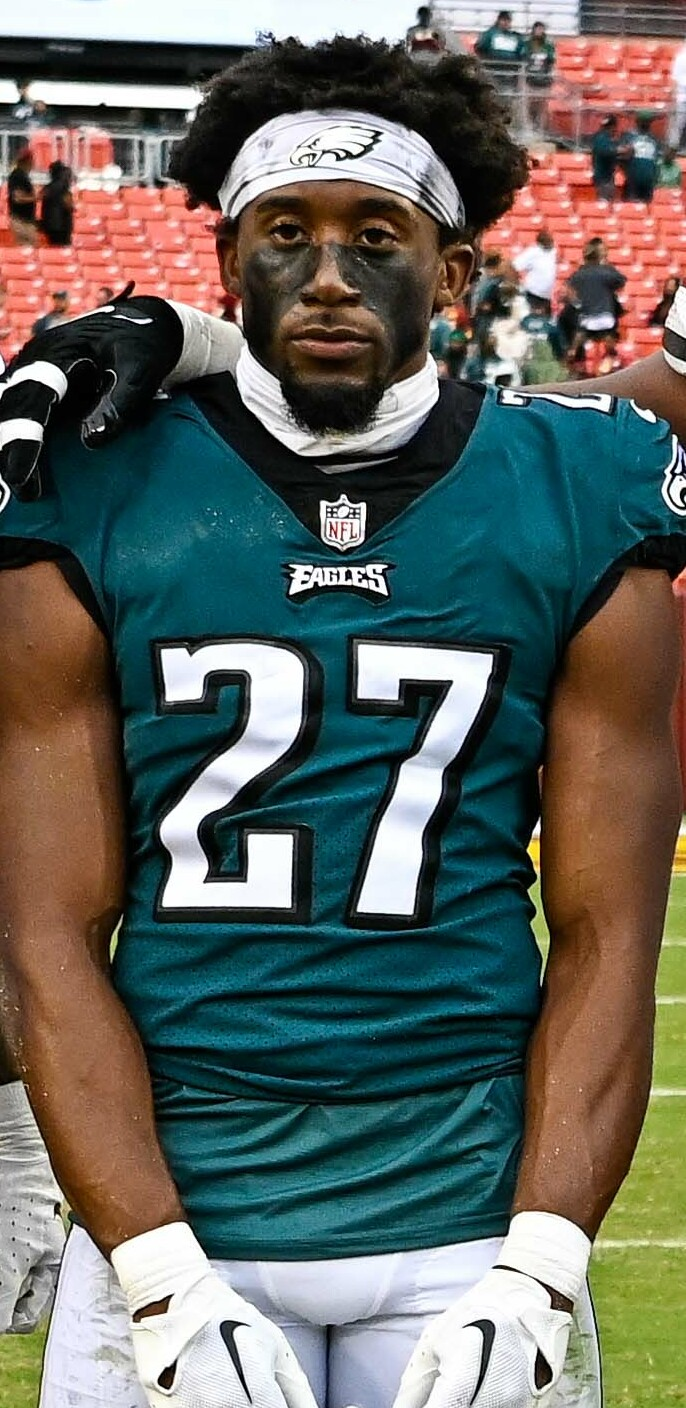
- McPhearson with the Philadelphia Eagles in 2022

Profile
- Position: Cornerback

Personal information
- Born: March 21, 1998 (age 28); Baltimore, Maryland, U.S.
- Listed height: 5 ft 11 in (1.80 m)
- Listed weight: 191 lb (87 kg)

Career information
- High school: Riverdale Baptist (Upper Marlboro, Maryland)
- College: Penn State (2017–2018); Texas Tech (2019–2020)
- NFL draft: 2021: 4th round, 123rd overall pick

Career history
- Philadelphia Eagles (2021–2023); Jacksonville Jaguars (2024)*; Los Angeles Rams (2026)*
- * Offseason or practice squad member only

Awards and highlights
- First-team All-Big 12 (2020)

Career NFL statistics as of 2024
- Total tackles: 30
- Sacks: 1
- Pass deflections: 2
- Stats at Pro Football Reference

Zechariah McPhearson (/ˈzæk/ ZAK; born March 21, 1998) is an American professional football cornerback. He played college football for the Texas Tech Red Raiders.

== Early life and college ==
Zech McPhearson was born on March 21, 1998, in Baltimore, Maryland. He went to Riverdale Baptist High School. He went to two colleges, Penn State University and Texas Tech University. After two seasons with Penn State where he played a combined 9 games, and had 14 tackles, he transferred to Texas Tech. With the Red Raiders, he played and started all 12 games in his junior year. He had 51 tackles (42 solo) with them that year. He also had two blocked kicks. In his senior season, he appeared in all 10 games, starting 9, and had 53 tackles. He had at least two tackles in all 10 games and had four interceptions in the season. He was named first-team All-Big 12 Conference by the conference coaches, Associated Press and the Phil Steele Magazine. He was named third-team All-American by Pro Football Focus and was named First-team All-Texas by Dave Campbell's Texas Football.

== Professional career ==
Pre-draft measurables
Height	Weight	Arm length	Hand span	Wingspan	40-yard dash	10-yard split	20-yard split	20-yard shuttle	Three-cone drill	Vertical jump	Broad jump	Bench press
5 ft 10 7/8 in (1.80 m)	191 lb (87 kg)	30 3/4 in (0.78 m)	8 3/4 in (0.22 m)	6 ft 4 in (1.93 m)	4.48 s	1.53 s	2.50 s	4.03 s	6.84 s	40.5 in (1.03 m)	10 ft 10 in (3.30 m)	14 reps
All values from Pro Day

=== Philadelphia Eagles ===
McPhearson was selected in the fourth round with the 123rd pick in the 2021 NFL draft by the Philadelphia Eagles. He signed his four-year rookie contract with Philadelphia on June 3, 2021.

In Week 1 of the 2022 season, McPhearson was named NFC Special Teams Player of the Week, after he made 2 special teams tackles and recovered a surprise onside kick attempt in a 38–35 win over the Detroit Lions. He is the first Eagle to receive the award since Jake Elliott in 2021.

During a preseason game against Cleveland in 2023, McPhearson suffered a torn Achilles which ended his season. He was waived/injured on August 19, 2023, and placed on injured reserve.

McPhearson was waived by the Eagles on August 27, 2024.

=== Jacksonville Jaguars ===
On September 10, 2024, the Jacksonville Jaguars signed McPhearson to their practice squad. He signed a reserve/future contract with Jacksonville on January 6, 2025. He was placed on injured reserve on August 13, and released on August 19.

=== Los Angeles Rams ===
On August 9, 2026, McPhearson signed with the Los Angeles Rams. He was placed on injured reserve on August 24. On September 5, McPhearson was released by Los Angeles with an injury settlement.

== Personal life ==
McPhearson's family has a history of playing sports. His father, Gerrick, earned a tryout for the New England Patriots as a defensive back in 1988, and his mother, Kim, played in the National Women's Football League. His older brother Gerrick played for the New York Giants. His older brother Derrick played football at the University of Illinois, then spend some time with the Milwaukee Brewers organization. Emmanuel played football at the University of New Mexico. Jeremiah played at IUP. Joshua played football at Penn State. Matthew was a 4th round draft pick out of high school to the Arizona Diamondback organization. His sister Kimberly plays collegiate soccer.
