= Luke Reynolds (American football) =

American football player

No. 85 – Virginia Tech Hokies
- Position: Tight end
- Class: Junior

Personal information
- Listed height: 6 ft 4 in (1.93 m)
- Listed weight: 250 lb (113 kg)

Career information
- High school: Cheshire Academy (Cheshire, Connecticut)
- College: Penn State (2024–2025); Virginia Tech (2026–present)
- Stats at ESPN

Luke Reynolds is an American college football tight end for the Virginia Tech Hokies. He previously played for the Penn State Nittany Lions.

== Early life ==
Reynolds grew up in Westford, Massachusetts and originally attended Lawrence Academy in Groton, Massachusetts. He transferred to Cheshire Academy in Cheshire, Connecticut after his sophomore year. As a senior, he caught 48 passes for 754 yards and nine touchdowns. After the season Reynolds played in the 2024 All-American Bowl.

Reynolds was initially rated a three-star recruit and committed to play college football at Penn State. He was later reranked as a five-star recruit and the best tight end prospect in the 2024 class by 247Sports.

== College career ==
Reynolds joined the Penn State Nittany Lions as an early enrollee in January 2024. He entered his freshman season as a backup at tight end to Tyler Warren. Reynolds finished his first season with the team with nine receptions for 111 yards and one touchdown. He played in all 13 of the Nittany Lions' games as a sophomore and caught 26 passes for 257 yards. After the end of the season, Reynolds entered the NCAA transfer portal.

Reynolds transferred to Virginia Tech, reuniting him with former Penn State head coach James Franklin.

=== Statistics ===
Legend
| **Bold** | Career High |

| Season | Team | GP | Receiving | | | | Rushing | | | |
| Season | Team | GP | Rec | Yds | Avg | TD | Att | Yds | Avg | TD |
|---|---|---|---|---|---|---|---|---|---|---|
| 2024 | Penn State | **16** | 9 | 111 | **12.3** | 1 | 1 | **32** | **32.0** | 0 |
| 2025 | Penn State | 13 | **26** | 257 | 9.9 | 0 | **2** | 26 | 13.0 | 0 |
| 2026 | Virginia Tech | 3 | 25 | **265** | 10.6 | **4** | 1 | -2 | -2.0 | 0 |
| Career | | 32 | 60 | 633 | 10.6 | 5 | 4 | 56 | 14.0 | 0 |
