= Bryce Baker =

American football player

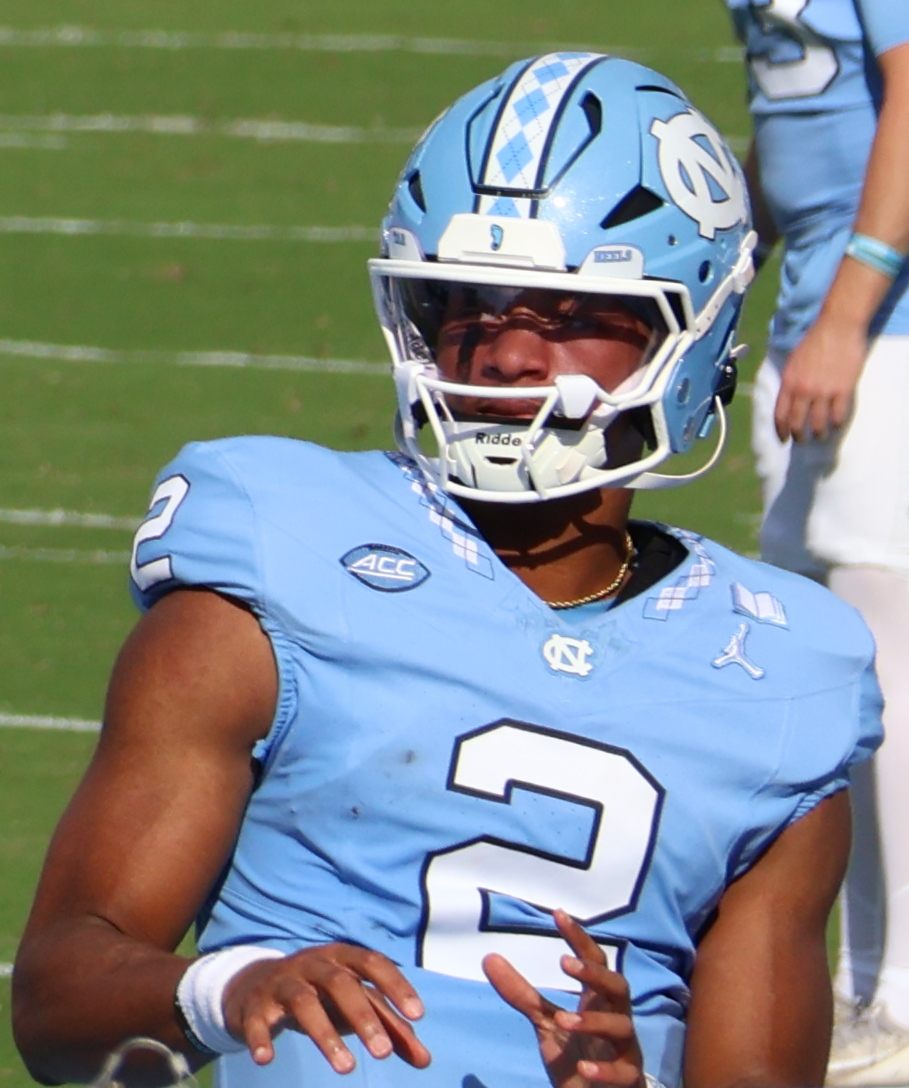
- Baker with North Carolina in 2025

No. 22 – Virginia Tech Hokies
- Position: Quarterback
- Class: Redshirt Freshman

Personal information
- Listed height: 6 ft 2 in (1.88 m)
- Listed weight: 211 lb (96 kg)

Career information
- High school: Walkertown (Forsyth County, North Carolina); East Forsyth (Kernersville, North Carolina)
- College: North Carolina (2025); Virginia Tech (2026–present)
- Stats at ESPN

Bryce Baker is an American college football quarterback for the Virginia Tech Hokies. He previously played for the North Carolina Tar Heels.

== Early life ==
Baker is from Kernersville, North Carolina. He attended Walkertown High School before later transferring to East Forsyth High School, and in high school, he played football, basketball, and competed in track and field. As a sophomore at Walkertown, he helped lead the team to an 8–3 record while throwing for 1,823 yards and 20 touchdowns. He then started at quarterback for East Forsyth as a junior in 2023, passing for 3,082 yards and 39 touchdowns with only three interceptions while leading the team to the second round of the state playoffs.

Prior to his senior season, Baker was invited to the finals of the Elite 11 quarterback competition. He also competed at the Manning Passing Academy. As a senior in 2024, Baker threw for 3,523 yards and 40 touchdowns with just five interceptions while completing 74.8% of his passes. He helped the team compile an overall record of 13–1 that year. Baker, an all-county selection, led East Forsyth to two conference championships and a record of 23–3 in his two years there, having thrown for 6,605 yards and 79 touchdowns along with 536 rushing yards and nine touchdowns.

Baker committed to play college football for the North Carolina Tar Heels in June 2023. He stayed committed to them and signed with the Tar Heels in December 2024 under new head coach Bill Belichick. He was a four-star recruit and was ranked the eighth-best quarterback recruit in the class of 2025 by 247Sports, as well as the 80th-best player overall in the nation.

== College career ==
=== North Carolina ===
Baker entered North Carolina in January 2025 as an early enrollee.

On December 22, 2025, Baker announced that he would enter the transfer portal.

=== Virginia Tech ===
On January 10, 2026, Baker announced that he would transfer to Virginia Tech.
