= East Forsyth High School (North Carolina) =

American public school in North Carolina

Location
- 2500 W Mountain St. Kernersville, North Carolina 27284; United States; 36°06′59″N 80°09′04″W

Information
- Type: Public
- Established: 1962 (64 years ago)
- School district: Winston-Salem/Forsyth County Schools
- CEEB code: 342015
- Principal: Rusty Hall
- Staff: 99.61 (FTE)
- Grades: 9–12
- Enrollment: 1,647 (2024-2025)
- Student to teacher ratio: 16.53
- Colors: Navy, white, and gray
- Athletics: NCHSAA 7A
- Athletics conference: Central Piedmont 7A/8A
- Mascot: Eagle
- Newspaper: Talon
- Yearbook: Aquila
- Website: wsfcs.k12.nc.us/efhs

East Forsyth High School is a public high school located in the town of Kernersville in Forsyth County, North Carolina. East Forsyth was established in 1962, and is a part of the Winston-Salem/Forsyth County Schools system.

== History ==
East Forsyth High School was established in 1962, after the consolidation of Kernersville, Walkertown, and Glenn High Schools all into one school. The school colors (navy blue and white), the mascot (the eagle), the alma mater and school fight song, were all decided before the school opened. In the 1980s, silver was added to their schools colors, but it eventually shifted to gray.

== Administration ==
- Principal: Rusty Hall
- Assistant principals: Carmen Lemmons, Julie Nichols, Alice Valdes, Jennifer Watson

== Athletics ==
East Forsyth is a member of the North Carolina High School Athletic Association (NCHSAA) and is classified as a 7A school. The school is a part of the Central Piedmont 7A/8A Conference. Listed below are the different sports teams at East Forsyth:

- Baseball
- Basketball
- Cheerleading
- Cross Country
- Dance
- Field hockey (girls only)
- Football
- Golf
- Lacrosse
- Indoor track
- Soccer
- Softball
- Swimming
- Tennis
- Track and field
- Volleyball
- Wrestling

=== Sporting achievements ===
Year	Achievements
1992	NCHSAA 4A Football State Champions
2010	NCHSAA 4A Baseball State Runner-ups
2018	NCHSAA 4A Football State Champions
2019	NCHSAA 4A Football State Champions

== Notable alumni ==
- Madison Bailey — actress
- Turner Battle — college basketball coach
- Chante Black — WNBA player
- Que'Sean Brown — college football wide receiver and punt returner for the Virginia Tech Hokies
- Alan Caldwell — NFL defensive back
- Ashley Christensen — chef, restaurateur, author, and culinary celebrity
- Ryan Dull — MLB pitcher
- Emily V. Gordon — award-winning writer and producer of The Big Sick; wife of Kumail Nanjiani
- DeLana Harvick — former co-manager of Kevin Harvick Incorporated; wife of Kevin Harvick
- Ricky Hickman — professional basketball player
- Brent LaRue — middle-distance runner, represented Slovenia at the 2012 Summer Olympics
- Ahmani Marshall — NFL running back
- Kevin Mattison — MLB outfielder
- Ben Newnam — professional soccer player
- Connor Norby — MLB second baseman
- Danny O'Brien — Canadian Football League coach and former quarterback
- Tyson Patterson — professional basketball player
- Josh Pittman — professional basketball player
- Jaylen Raynor — college football quarterback for the Iowa State Cyclones
- Greg Scales — NFL tight end
- Geno Segers — actor for Disney's Pair of Kings
- Alec Zumwalt — MLB coach
