= Tait Reynolds =

American football player (born 2007)

No. 2 – Clemson Tigers
- Position: Quarterback
- Class: Freshman

Personal information
- Born: March 29, 2007 (age 19); Queen Creek, Arizona, U.S.
- Listed height: 6 ft 2 in (1.88 m)
- Listed weight: 215 lb (98 kg)

Career information
- High school: Queen Creek (AZ)
- College: Clemson (2026–present)
- Stats at ESPN

Tait Reynolds (born March 29, 2007) is an American college football quarterback for the Clemson Tigers.

== Early life ==
Reynolds was born on March 29, 2007 in Queen Creek, Arizona. He is the second-youngest of six children, and his father, as well as both brothers, also played college football. He grew up with a focus on baseball but also played football as a quarterback. He attended Queen Creek High School, where as a sophomore he threw for 1,808 yards and 11 touchdowns while running for 631 yards and 17 touchdowns. The following year, he threw for 2,238 yards with 22 touchdowns while running for 1,426 yards and 19 touchdowns. Reynolds was named first-team all-state and the state player of the year. He did not play most of his senior year due to injury. At Queen Creek, Reynolds was also a top baseball player and was selected first-team all-conference, all-region and all-state, while being ranked one of the top 100 baseball prospects nationally. He had the game-winning, walk-off hit to win the 2024 state baseball championship, the first in school history.

Reynolds originally committed to play college baseball for the Arizona State Sun Devils as a high school freshman, but later changed his mind. He was ranked a four-star prospect and a top-10 quarterback recruit in the college football recruiting class of 2026. Reynolds committed to play both college football and baseball for the Clemson Tigers.

== College career ==
Reynolds entered his freshman season at Clemson in 2026 competing with Christopher Vizzina for the Tigers' starting quarterback role, with Vizzina being named the starter entering the season. Reynolds made his collegiate debut in the season opener against LSU, completing four passes for 22 yards. After injuries and subpar play from Vizzina, Reynolds was named the Tigers' starting quarterback. In his first career start against North Carolina, he threw for 215 yards, a touchdown, and an interception in a 28–20 come-from-behind victory.

=== Statistics ===
Year	Team	Games			Passing								Rushing			
Year	Team	GP	GS	Record	Cmp	Att	Pct	Yds	Y/A	TD	Int	Rtg	Att	Yds	Avg	TD
2026	Clemson	10	8	5–3	156	241	64.7	1,449	6.0	3	4	116.0	110	334	3.0	2
Career		10	8	5–3	156	241	64.7	1,449	6.0	3	4	116.0	110	334	3.0	2
