= Cortez Harris =

American football player

No. 34 – Virginia Tech Hokies
- Position: Defensive end
- Class: Sophomore

Personal information
- Listed height: 6 ft 2 in (1.88 m)
- Listed weight: 253 lb (115 kg)

Career information
- High school: Riverdale Baptist School (Upper Marlboro, Maryland)
- College: Penn State (2025); Virginia Tech (2026–present)
- Stats at ESPN

Cortez Jayshawn Harris is an American college football defensive end for the Virginia Tech Hokies. He previously played for the Penn State Nittany Lions.

== Early life ==
Harris attended the Riverdale Baptist School in Upper Marlboro, Maryland. He had 15 sacks his sophomore year, six his junior and 6.5 his senior year over only four games played. He missed most of his senior season due to an injury. Harris committed to Penn State University to play college football.

== College career ==
Harris appeared in two games his only season at Penn State in 2025 and redshirted. After the season, he entered the transfer portal and committed to Virginia Tech. In his first game with the Hokies in 2026, he recorded a sack.
