= Christopher Vizzina =

American football player (born 2005)

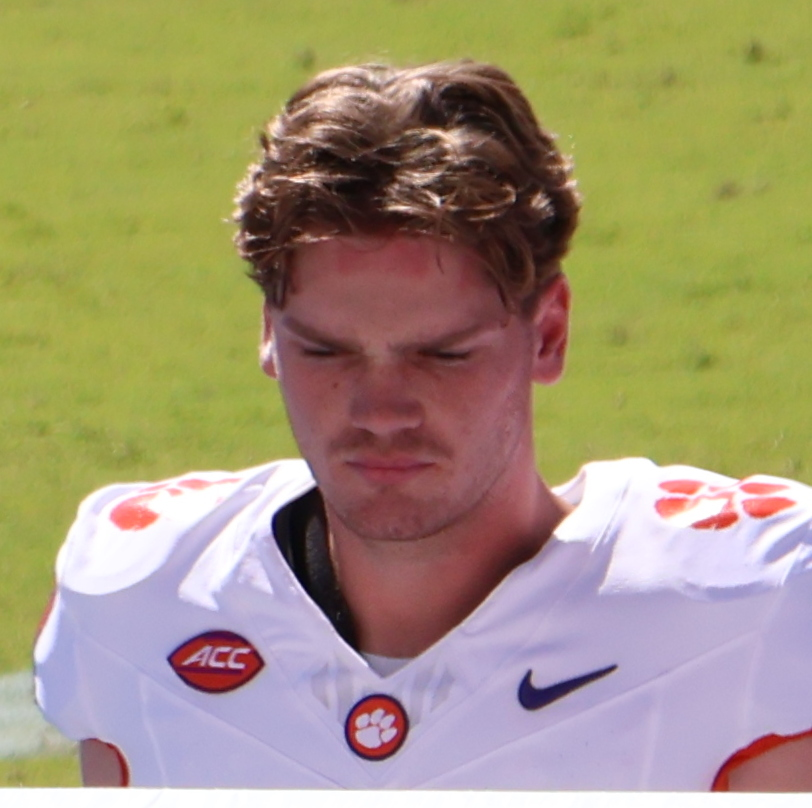
- Vizzina with the Clemson Tigers in 2025

No. 17 – Clemson Tigers
- Position: Quarterback
- Class: Redshirt Junior

Personal information
- Born: April 27, 2005 (age 21); Birmingham, Alabama, U.S.
- Listed height: 6 ft 4 in (1.93 m)
- Listed weight: 210 lb (95 kg)

Career information
- High school: Briarwood Christian (Birmingham, Alabama)
- College: Clemson (2023–present)
- Stats at ESPN

Christopher Vizzina (born April 27, 2005) is an American college football quarterback for the Clemson Tigers.

== Early life ==
Vizzina was born on April 27, 2005, in Birmingham, Alabama. He attended Briarwood Christian School in Birmingham, where he played high school football and was a four-year starter. He passed for 1,176 yards with 11 touchdowns his freshman season and 1,969 yards and 13 touchdowns his sophomore season. During his junior year he had 2,065 passing yards with 16 touchdowns and rushed for 600 yards and 15 touchdowns. As a senior, Vizzina played in nine games and passed for 1,828 yards and 16 touchdowns and rushed for 341 yards and 11 touchdowns.

One of the top quarterback recruits in his class, Vizzina committed to Clemson University to play college football.

== College career ==
Vizzina played in one game and redshirted his first year at Clemson in 2023. He spent the 2024 season as a backup to Cade Klubnik, appearing in seven games and completing 19 of 34 passes for 190 yards and rushing 13 times for 68 yards with a touchdown. He returned to Clemson as Klubnik's backup in 2025.

=== Statistics ===
Season	Team	Games			Passing								Rushing			
Season	Team	GP	GS	Record	Cmp	Att	Pct	Yds	Avg	TD	Int	Rate	Att	Yds	Avg	TD
2023	Clemson	2	0	0–0	0	0	0.0	0	0	0	0	0	0	0	0	0
2024	Clemson	7	0	0–0	19	34	55.9	190	5.6	0	0	102.8	13	68	5.2	1
2025	Clemson	5	1	0–1	45	71	63.4	406	5.7	4	1	127.2	25	41	1.6	0
2026	Clemson	3	2	1–1	26	50	52.0	235	4.7	1	3	86.1	15	16	1.1	0
Career		16	2	1–2	90	155	58.1	831	5.4	5	4	108.6	53	125	2.4	1
