= Que'Sean Brown =

American football player (born 2005)

No. 3 – Virginia Tech Hokies
- Positions: Wide receiver, punt returner
- Class: Senior

Personal information
- Born: August 22, 2005 (age 21)
- Listed height: 5 ft 8 in (1.73 m)
- Listed weight: 175 lb (79 kg)

Career information
- High school: East Forsyth (Kernersville, North Carolina)
- College: Duke (2023–2025); Virginia Tech (2026–present)
- Stats at ESPN

Que'Sean Brown (born August 22, 2005) is an American football wide receiver and punt returner for the Virginia Tech Hokies. He previously played for the Duke Blue Devils.

== Early life ==
Brown attended East Forsyth High School in Kernersville, North Carolina. In two seasons, he had 93 receptions for 1,977 yards and 43 touchdowns. Brown also competed in track and field and finished fifth at the state championship in the 100-meter run with a time of 10.76. As a three-star recruit, he committed to play college football at Duke University.

== College career ==
Brown redshirted his first year at Duke, where he played in two games and had two catches for 19 yards. The following season, he recorded 41 receptions for 445 yards and two touchdowns. Brown earned honorable mention All-ACC honors as a return specialist after he returned 24 punts for 233 yards.

In 2025, Brown appeared in 14 games, registering 64 receptions for 846 yards and five touchdowns. He also had nine punt returns for 116 yards and a touchdown. On January 7, 2026, Brown entered the transfer portal. On January 10, he committed to Virginia Tech.
