= List of Bucknell Bison head football coaches =

The Bucknell Bison football program is a college football team that represents Bucknell University in the Patriot League, a part of the NCAA Division I Football Championship Subdivision. The team has had 29 head coaches since its first recorded football game in 1883. The current coach is Jeff Behrman, who took the position prior to the 2026 season.

== Key ==
Key to symbols in coaches list
General		Overall		Conference		Postseason (Note: Although the first Rose Bowl Game was played in 1902, it has been continuously played since the 1916 game, and is recognized as the oldest bowl game by the NCAA. "—" indicates any season prior to 1916 when postseason games were not played.)	
No.	Order of coaches (Note: A running total of the number of head coaches, with coaches who served separate tenures being counted only once. Interim head coaches are represented with "Int" and are not counted in the running total. "—" indicates the team played but either without a coach or no coach is on record. "X" indicates an interim year without play.)	GC	Games coached	CW	Conference wins	PW	Postseason wins
DC	Division championships	OW	Overall wins	CL	Conference losses	PL	Postseason losses
CC	Conference championships	OL	Overall losses	CT	Conference ties	PT	Postseason ties
NC	National championships	OT	Overall ties (Note: Overtime rules in college football were introduced in 1996, making ties impossible in the period since.)	C%	Conference winning percentage		
†	Elected to the College Football Hall of Fame	O%	Overall winning percentage (Note: When computing the win–loss percentage, a tie counts as half a win and half a loss.)				

== Coaches ==
Coaching information as of the 2025 football season

No.	Name	Term	GC	OW	OL	OT	O%	CW	CL	CT	C%	PW	PL	CCs	Awards
—	No coach	1883–1892	34	13	18	3	.426								
1	Will Young	1893–1896	30	19	10	1	.650								
2	George Jennings	1897–1898	18	7	7	4	.500								
3	George W. Hoskins	1899–1906, 1909	81	40	37	4	.519								
4	James H. Costello	1907	11	4	7	0	.364								
5	Paul G. Smith	1908	10	3	5	2	.400								
6	Byron W. Dickson	1910–1913	38	20	16	2	.553								
7	George Cockill	1914	9	4	4	1	.500								
8	George Johnson	1915–1917	32	8	20	4	.313								
9	Edgar Wingard	1918	6	6	0	0	1.000								
10	Pete Reynolds	1919–1923	48	27	18	3	.594								
11	Charley Moran	1924–1926	31	19	10	2	.645								
12	Carl Snavely	1927–1933	66	42	16	8	.697								
13	Edward Mylin	1934–1936	29	17	9	3	.638								
14	Al Humphreys	1937–1942, 1946	59	30	24	5	.551								
15	John Sitarsky	1943	10	6	4	0	.600								
16	J. Ellwood Ludwig	1944–1945	17	9	7	1	.559								
17	Harry Lawrence	1947–1957	97	45	51	1	.469								
18	Bob Odell	1958–1964	63	37	26	0	.587								
19	Carroll Huntress	1965–1968	38	19	19	0	.500								
20	Fred Prender	1969–1974	57	23	31	3	.430								
21	Bob Curtis	1975–1985	107	48	56	3	.463								
22	George Landis	1986–1988	30	10	19	1	.350								
23	Lou Maranzana	1989–1994	64	26	38	0	.406								
24	Tom Gadd	1995–2001	76	48	28	0	.632								
25	Dave Kotulski	2002	11	2	9	0	.182								
26	Tim Landis	2003–2009	78	32	46	0	.410								
27	Joe Susan	2010–2018	99	38	61	0	.384								
28	Dave Cecchini	2019–2025	72	24	48	0	.333								
29	Jeff Behrman	2026–present	0	0	0	0	–								
