= 1897 Bucknell football team =

American college football season

1897 Bucknell football
- Conference: Independent
- Record: 3–3–1
- Head coach: George Jennings (1st season)
- Captain: Emmanuel Cober

1897 Eastern college football independents records
	Conf.			Overall
Team	W	L	T	W		L		T
Penn		–		15	–	0	–	0
Princeton		–		10	–	1	–	0
Washington & Jefferson		–		10	–	1	–	0
Yale		–		9	–	0	–	2
Buffalo		–		9	–	1	–	0
Harvard		–		10	–	1	–	1
Army		–		6	–	1	–	1
Vermont		–		3	–	0	–	2
Lafayette		–		9	–	2	–	1
Drexel		–		6	–	2	–	1
Colgate		–		5	–	2	–	1
Dickinson		–		7	–	3	–	2
Swarthmore		–		7	–	3	–	2
Fordham		–		2	–	1	–	1
Cornell		–		5	–	3	–	1
Syracuse		–		5	–	3	–	1
Brown		–		7	–	4	–	0
Carlisle		–		6	–	4	–	0
Boston College		–		4	–	3	–	0
Holy Cross		–		4	–	3	–	1
Wesleyan		–		8	–	7	–	0
Bucknell		–		3	–	3	–	1
NYU		–		3	–	3	–	0
Temple		–		3	–	3	–	0
Trinity (CT)		–		4	–	4	–	1
Tufts		–		6	–	7	–	0
Geneva		–		3	–	4	–	1
Pittsburgh College		–		3	–	5	–	2
Villanova		–		3	–	5	–	1
Penn State		–		3	–	6	–	0
Amherst		–		2	–	6	–	2
Franklin & Marshall		–		2	–	6	–	2
Lehigh		–		3	–	7	–	0
New Hampshire		–		2	–	5	–	0
Rutgers		–		2	–	5	–	0
Western Univ. Penn.		–		1	–	3	–	0

The 1897 Bucknell football team was an American football team that represented Bucknell University as an independent during the 1897 college football season. Led by first-year head coach George Jennings, Bucknell compiled a 3–3–1 record. Emmanuel Cober was the team captain.

== Schedule ==
Date	Time	Opponent	Site	Result	Attendance	Source
September 22		Penn	Bucknell campus; Lewisburg, PA	L 0–17		
September 25	3:00 p.m.	Williamsport High School	Bucknell campus; Lewisburg, PA	W 45–0		
October 2	3:15 p.m.	at Penn	Franklin Field; Philadelphia, PA	L 0–33		
October 9	2:10 p.m.	Penn reserves	Lewisburg, PA	T 6–6		
October 23		vs. Lehigh	Williamsport, PA	W 28–20	1,500	
October 30	2:30 p.m.	Bloomsburg Normal	Bucknell campus; Lewisburg, PA	W 6–0		
November 13	2:40 p.m.	vs. Penn State	Athletic Park; Williamsport, PA	L 4–27	1,800	
