= George Jennings (disambiguation) =

George Jennings (1810–1882) was an English sanitary engineer and plumber who invented the first public flush toilets.

George Jennings may also refer to:

- George Jennings (MP) (1721–1790), British politician
- George Jennings (cricketer) (1895–1959), English cricketer
- George Jennings (rugby league) (born 1993), Australian rugby league footballer
- George Jennings (American football) (1872–1918), American college football coach and physician
- George Jennings (actor), British actor who played Mr Woods in EastEnders
