= 2026 Bucknell Bison football team =

American college football season

2026 Bucknell Bison football
- Conference: Patriot League
- Record: 1–11 (0–9 Patriot)
- Head coach: Jeff Behrman (1st season)
- Offensive coordinator: Travis James (1st season)
- Defensive coordinator: Jeffrey Long Jr. (1st season)
- Home stadium: Christy Mathewson–Memorial Stadium

2026 Patriot League football standings
	Conf.			Overall
Team	W		L	W		L
No. 16 Lehigh $^	8	–	1	10	–	2
Holy Cross	7	–	2	7	–	5
Colgate	6	–	3	7	–	5
Villanova	6	–	3	7	–	5
Richmond	5	–	4	7	–	5
Fordham	4	–	5	4	–	8
Lafayette	3	–	5	4	–	7
Georgetown	3	–	5	3	–	7
William & Mary	2	–	7	4	–	8
Bucknell	0	–	9	1	–	11
$ – Conference champion; ^ – FCS playoff participant; As of November 22, 2026; Rankings from STATS Poll

The 2026 Bucknell Bison football team represented Bucknell University as a member of the Patriot League during the 2026 NCAA Division I FCS football season. The Bison were led by first-year head coach Jeff Behrman and played their home games at Christy Mathewson–Memorial Stadium in Lewisburg, Pennsylvania.

== Schedule ==
Date	Time	Opponent	Site	TV	Result	Attendance
August 29	6:00 p.m.	at Richmond	E. Claiborne Robins Stadium; Richmond, VA	ESPN+	L 14–35	5,717
September 5	6:00 p.m.	No. 18 Villanova	Christy Mathewson-Memorial Stadium; Lewisburg, PA	ESPN+	L 16–17	N/A
September 12	12:30 p.m.	at VMI*	Alumni Memorial Field; Lexington, VA	ESPN+	W 14–3	5,235
September 19	3:00 p.m.	Penn*	Christy Mathewson-Memorial Stadium; Lewisburg, PA	ESPN+	L 7–20	3,360
September 26	12:00 p.m.	at Pittsburgh*	Acrisure Stadium; Pittsburgh, PA	ACCNX	L 0–59	43,920
October 10	12:30 p.m.	at Georgetown	Cooper Field; Washington, DC	ESPN+	L 14–21	1,268
October 17	3:00 p.m.	Lafayette	Christy Mathewson-Memorial Stadium; Lewisburg, PA	ESPN+	L 7–20	1,580
October 24	1:00 p.m.	at Holy Cross	Fitton Field; Worcester, MA	ESPN+	L 3–34	12,422
October 31	12:00 p.m.	at No. 19 Lehigh	Goodman Stadium; Bethlehem, PA	ESPN+	L 30–31	4,313
November 7	1:00 p.m.	Fordham	Christy Mathewson-Memorial Stadium; Lewisburg, PA	ESPN+	L 13–38	853
November 14	1:00 p.m.	at William & Mary	Zable Stadium; Williamsburg, VA	ESPN+	L 24–41	8,734
November 21	1:00 p.m.	Colgate	Christy Mathewson-Memorial Stadium; Lewisburg, PA	ESPN+	L 20–21	637
*Non-conference game; Rankings from STATS Poll released prior to the game; All times are in Eastern time

== Game summaries ==
=== at Richmond ===
Bucknell Bison (0–0) at Richmond Spiders (0–0) – Game summary

Quarter	1	2	3	4	Total
Bison	0	0	7	7	14
Spiders	21	7	0	7	35

at E. Claiborne Robins Stadium • Richmond, VA

- Date: August 29
- Game time: 6:00 p.m. EDT
- Game weather: Sunny • Temperature: 80 °F (27 °C) • Wind: E at 5 miles per hour (8.0 km/h)
- Game attendance: 5,717
- Referee: Jeremy DeAngulo
- TV announcers (ESPN+): Bob Black, Chris Anderson and Guerin Austin

Game information

First quarter

- RICH – Ashten Snelsire 8-yard pass to Carson Derey (Kyle Bitsko kick), 10:21. Spiders 7–0. Drive: 6 plays, 59 yards, 3:06.
- RICH – Ashten Snelsire 9-yard pass to Bryce Allen (Kyle Bitsko kick), 6:06. Spiders 14–0. Drive: 7 plays, 38 yards, 3:19.
- RICH – Aziz Foster-Powell 1-yard run (Kyle Bitsko kick), 1:08. Spiders 21–0. Drive: 5 plays, 40 yards, 2:17.

Second quarter

- RICH – Aziz Foster-Powell 5-yard run (Kyle Bitsko kick), 1:56. Spiders 28–0. Drive: 3 plays, 30 yards, 1:39.

Third quarter

- BUCK – Chris Dietrich 51-yard pass to Michael Cadden (Juan Garanton kick), 2:34. Spiders 28–7. Drive: 2 plays, 74 yards, 1:00.

Fourth quarter

- BUCK – Chris Dietrich 29-yard pass to Sam Milligan (Juan Garanton kick), 13:03. Spiders 28–14. Drive: 9 plays, 69 yards, 3:42.
- RICH – Ashten Snelsire 75-yard pass to Bryce Allen (Kyle Bitsko kick), 12:53. Spiders 35–14. Drive: 1 play, 75 yards, 0:10.

Statistics	BUCK	RICH
First downs	12	17
Plays–yards	59–187	62–393
Rushes–yards	29–32	34–194
Passing yards	155	199
Passing: comp–att–int	16–30–0	17–28–0
Turnovers	1	1
Time of possession	28:54	31:06

Team	Category	Player	Statistics
Bucknell	Passing	Chris Dietrich	16/30, 155 yards, 2 TD
Bucknell	Rushing	Michael Cadden	12 carries, 24 yards
Bucknell	Receiving	Sam Milligan	6 receptions, 70 yards, TD
Richmond	Passing	Ashten Snelsire	17/28, 199 yards, 3 TD
Richmond	Rushing	Aziz Foster-Powell	15 carries, 108 yards, 2 TD
Richmond	Receiving	Bryce Allen	4 receptions, 106 yards, 2 TD

=== No. 18 Villanova ===
No. 18 Villanova Wildcats (0–1) at Bucknell Bison (0–1) – Game summary

Quarter	1	2	3	4	Total
No. 18 Wildcats	7	7	0	3	17
Bison	0	0	13	3	16

at Christy Mathewson–Memorial Stadium • Lewisburg, Pennsylvania

- Date: September 5
- Game time: 6:00 p.m. EDT
- Game weather: Sunny • Wind: NW at 8 miles per hour (13 km/h)
- Game attendance: N/A
- Referee: Antonio Marcella
- TV announcers (ESPN+): Doug Birdsong and Charlie Fisher

Game information

First quarter

- VILL – Braden Reed 26-yard pass from Pat McQuaide (Dominic LeBlanc kick), 5:24. Wildcats 7–0. Drive: 8 plays, 76 yards, 3:27.

Second quarter

- VILL – Braden Reed 16-yard pass from Pat McQuaide (Dominic LeBlanc kick), 1:13. Wildcats 14–0. Drive: 6 plays, 72 yards, 2:04.

Third quarter

- BUCK – Sam Milligan 1-yard pass from Christopher Dietrich (Juan Garanton kick), 7:54. Wildcats 14–7. Drive: 15 plays, 75 yards, 7:06.
- BUCK – Sam Milligan 10-yard pass from Christopher Dietrich (Juan Garanton PAT failed), 1:09. Wildcats 14–13. Drive: 9 plays, 59 yards, 5:14.

Fourth quarter

- BUCK – Juan Garanton 40-yard field goal, 12:06. Bison 16–14. Drive: 6 plays, -3 yards, 2:39.
- VILL – Dominic LeBlanc 22-yard field goal, 8:20. Wildcats 17–16. Drive: 8 plays, 65 yards, 3:42.

Statistics	VILL	BUCK
First downs	16	22
Plays–yards	53–305	69–305
Rushes–yards	33–87	30–60
Passing yards	218	245
Passing: comp–att–int	13–20–0	29–39–0
Turnovers	0	0
Time of possession	24:30	35:30

Team	Category	Player	Statistics
Villanova	Passing	Pat McQuaide	13/20, 218 yards, 2 TD
Villanova	Rushing	Ja'briel Mace	13 carries, 70 yards
Villanova	Receiving	Brandon Binkowski	3 receptions, 71 yards
Bucknell	Passing	Christopher Dietrich	29/39, 245 yards, 2 TD
Bucknell	Rushing	Michael Cadden	9 carries, 37 yards
Bucknell	Receiving	Sam Milligan	13 receptions, 135 yards, 2 TD

=== at VMI ===
Bucknell Bison (0–2) at VMI Keydets (0–2) – Game summary

Quarter	1	2	3	4	Total
Bison	0	0	0	14	14
Keydets	0	3	0	0	3

at Alumni Memorial Field • Lexington, Virginia

- Date: September 12
- Game time: 1:30 p.m. EDT
- Game weather: Sunny
- Game attendance: 5,235
- Referee: Brian Hilspich
- TV announcers (ESPN+): Wade Branner and Chip Tarkenton

Game information

First quarter

- No scoring plays.

Second quarter

- VMI – Jack Joyce 26-yard field goal, 0:03. Keydets 3–0. Drive: 13 plays, 72 yards, 5:55.

Third quarter

- No scoring plays.

Fourth quarter

- BUCK – Jackson Nowinski 27-yard pass from Chris Dietrich (Juan Garanton kick), 6:51. Bison 7–3. Drive: 6 plays, 66 yards, 2:37.
- BUCK – Michael Cadden 8-yard run (Juan Garanton kick), 2:19. Bison 14–3. Drive: 5 plays, 46 yards, 2:03.

Statistics	BUCK	VMI
First downs	17	14
Plays–yards	58–342	63–259
Rushes–yards	28–121	36–104
Passing yards	221	155
Passing: comp–att–int	22–30–0	11–27–1
Turnovers	0	1
Time of possession	28:25	31:35

Team	Category	Player	Statistics
Bucknell	Passing	Chris Dietrich	22/30, 221 yards, TD
Bucknell	Rushing	Michael Cadden	14 carries, 70 yards, TD
Bucknell	Receiving	Kaleb Lampkins	1 reception, 46 yards
VMI	Passing	Ian Reynolds	11/27, 155 yards, INT
VMI	Rushing	Ian Reynolds	7 carries, 26 yards
VMI	Receiving	Cade Cox	3 receptions, 49 yards

=== Penn ===
Penn Quakers (0–0) at Bucknell Bison (1–2) – Game summary

Quarter	1	2	3	4	Total
Quakers	14	0	6	0	20
Bison	0	7	0	0	7

at Christy Mathewson–Memorial Stadium • Lewisburg, Pennsylvania

- Date: September 19
- Game time: 3:00 p.m. EDT
- Game weather: Sunny
- Game attendance: 3,360
- Referee: Travis Barta
- TV announcers (ESPN+): Doug Bidsong and Charlie Fisher

Game information

First quarter

- PENN – Miles Teodecki 1-yard run (Mason Walters kick), 3:23. Quakers 7–0. Drive: 12 plays, 85 yards, 5:10.
- PENN – Mason Page 37-yard pass from Miles Teodecki (Mason Walters kick), 0:03. Quakers 14–0. Drive: 4 plays, 50 yards, 1:26.

Second quarter

- BUCK – Nate Olson 77-yard interception return (Juan Garanton kick), 10:12. Quakers 14–7.

Third quarter

- PENN – Dante Barone 10-yard pass from Miles Teodecki (Mason Walters PAT blocked), 3:20. Quakers 20–7. Drive: 8 plays, 53 yards, 5:04.

Fourth quarter

- No scoring plays.

Statistics	PENN	BUCK
First downs	17	6
Plays–yards	79–367	49–124
Rushes–yards	45–170	19–40
Passing yards	197	84
Passing: comp–att–int	18–34–1	11–30–1
Turnovers	2	1
Time of possession	39:40	20:20

Team	Category	Player	Statistics
Penn	Passing	Miles Teodecki	18/34, 197 yards, 2 TD, INT
Penn	Rushing	Miles Teodecki	13 carries, 87 yards, TD
Penn	Receiving	Luke Johnson	6 receptions, 75 yards
Bucknell	Passing	Emmett Dowling	8/21, 76 yards, INT
Bucknell	Rushing	Ty Stauffer	11 carries, 31 yards
Bucknell	Receiving	Sam Milligan	3 receptions, 43 yards

=== at Pittsburgh (FBS) ===
Bucknell Bison (1–3) at Pittsburgh Panthers (FBS) (3–0) – Game summary

Quarter	1	2	Total
Bison			0
Panthers (FBS)			0

at Acrisure Stadium • Pittsburgh, Pennsylvania

- Date: September 26
- Game time: 12:00 p.m. EDT
- TV announcers (ACCNX): Pete Sousa and Leger Douzable

Game information

First quarter
Second quarter
Third quarter
Fourth quarter

Statistics	BUCK	PITT
First downs		
Plays–yards		
Rushes–yards		
Passing yards		
Passing: comp–att–int		
Turnovers		
Time of possession		

Team	Category	Player	Statistics
Bucknell	Passing		
Bucknell	Rushing		
Bucknell	Receiving		
Pittsburgh	Passing		
Pittsburgh	Rushing		
Pittsburgh	Receiving		

=== at Georgetown ===
Bucknell Bison (1–4) at Georgetown Hoyas (0–4) – Game summary

Quarter	1	2	3	4	Total
Bison	0	0	0	0	0
Hoyas	0	0	0	0	0

at Cooper Field • Washington, DC

- Date: October 10
- Game time: 12:30 p.m.
- TV: ESPN+

Game information

First quarter
Second quarter
Third quarter
Fourth quarter

Statistics	BUCK	GTWN
First downs		
Plays–yards		
Rushes–yards		
Passing yards		
Passing: comp–att–int		
Turnovers		
Time of possession		

Team	Category	Player	Statistics
Bucknell	Passing		
Bucknell	Rushing		
Bucknell	Receiving		
Georgetown	Passing		
Georgetown	Rushing		
Georgetown	Receiving		

=== Lafayette ===
Lafayette Leopards (1–4) at Bucknell Bison (1–5) – Game summary

Quarter	1	2	3	4	Total
Leopards	0	0	0	0	0
Bison	0	0	0	0	0

at Christy Mathewson–Memorial Stadium • Lewisburg, Pennsylvania

- Date: October 17
- Game time: 3:00 p.m.
- TV: ESPN+

Game information

First quarter
Second quarter
Third quarter
Fourth quarter

Statistics	LAF	BUCK
First downs		
Plays–yards		
Rushes–yards		
Passing yards		
Passing: comp–att–int		
Turnovers		
Time of possession		

Team	Category	Player	Statistics
Lafayette	Passing		
Lafayette	Rushing		
Lafayette	Receiving		
Bucknell	Passing		
Bucknell	Rushing		
Bucknell	Receiving		

=== at Holy Cross ===
Bucknell Bison (1–6) at Holy Cross Crusaders (2–5) – Game summary

Quarter	1	2	3	4	Total
Bison	-	-	-	-	0
Crusaders	-	-	-	-	0

at Fitton Field • Worcester, MA

- Date: October 24
- Game time: 1:00 p.m. EDT
- TV: ESPN+

Game information

First quarter

Second quarter

Third quarter

Fourth quarter

Statistics	BUCK	HC
First downs		
Plays–yards		
Rushes–yards		
Passing yards		
Passing: Comp–Att–Int		
Turnovers		
Time of possession		

Team	Category	Player	Statistics
Bucknell	Passing		
Bucknell	Rushing		
Bucknell	Receiving		
Holy Cross	Passing		
Holy Cross	Rushing		
Holy Cross	Receiving		

=== at No. 19 Lehigh ===
Bucknell Bison (1–7) at No. 19 Lehigh Mountain Hawks (6–2) – Game summary

Quarter	1	2	Total
Bison			0
No. 19 Mountain Hawks			0

at Goodman Stadium • Lower Saucon Township, Pennsylvania

- Date: October 31
- Game time: 12:00 p.m.

Game information

First quarter
Second quarter
Third quarter
Fourth quarter

Statistics	BUCK	LEH
First downs		
Plays–yards		
Rushes–yards		
Passing yards		
Passing: comp–att–int		
Turnovers		
Time of possession		

Team	Category	Player	Statistics
Bucknell	Passing		
Bucknell	Rushing		
Bucknell	Receiving		
Lehigh	Passing		
Lehigh	Rushing		
Lehigh	Receiving		

=== Fordham ===
Fordham Rams (2–7) at Bucknell Bison (1–8) – Game summary

Quarter	1	2	Total
Rams			0
Bison			0

at Christy Mathewson–Memorial Stadium • Lewisburg, Pennsylvania

- Date: November 7, 2026
- Game time: 1:00 p.m.
- TV: ESPN+

Game information

First quarter
Second quarter
Third quarter
Fourth quarter

Statistics	FOR	BUCK
First downs		
Plays–yards		
Rushes–yards		
Passing yards		
Passing: comp–att–int		
Turnovers		
Time of possession		

Team	Category	Player	Statistics
Fordham	Passing		
Fordham	Rushing		
Fordham	Receiving		
Bucknell	Passing		
Bucknell	Rushing		
Bucknell	Receiving		

=== at William & Mary ===
Bucknell Bison (1–9) at William & Mary Tribe (3–7) – Game summary

Quarter	1	2	3	4	Total
Bison	0	0	0	0	0
Tribe	0	0	0	0	0

at Zable Stadium • Williamsburg, Virginia

- Date: November 14
- Game time: 1:00 p.m.

Game information

First quarter
Second quarter
Third quarter
Fourth quarter

Statistics	BUCK	W&M
First downs		
Plays–yards		
Rushes–yards		
Passing yards		
Passing: comp–att–int		
Turnovers		
Time of possession		

Team	Category	Player	Statistics
Bucknell	Passing		
Bucknell	Rushing		
Bucknell	Receiving		
William & Mary	Passing		
William & Mary	Rushing		
William & Mary	Receiving		

=== Colgate ===
Colgate Raiders (6–5) at Bucknell Bison (1–10) – Game summary

Quarter	1	2	Total
Raiders			0
Bison			0

at Christy Mathewson–Memorial Stadium • Lewisburg, Pennsylvania

- Date: November 21
- Game time: 1:00 p.m.
- TV: ESPN+

Game information

First quarter
Second quarter
Third quarter
Fourth quarter

Statistics	COLG	BUCK
First downs		
Plays–yards		
Rushes–yards		
Passing yards		
Passing: comp–att–int		
Turnovers		
Time of possession		

Team	Category	Player	Statistics
Colgate	Passing		
Colgate	Rushing		
Colgate	Receiving		
Bucknell	Passing		
Bucknell	Rushing		
Bucknell	Receiving		
