= 2026 Holy Cross Crusaders football team =

American college football season

2026 Holy Cross Crusaders football
- Conference: Patriot League
- Record: 7–5 (7–2 Patriot)
- Head coach: Dan Curran (3rd season)
- Offensive coordinator: Matt Schell (1st season)
- Defensive coordinator: Bryan Robbat (1st season)
- Home stadium: Fitton Field

2026 Patriot League football standings
	Conf.			Overall
Team	W		L	W		L
No. 16 Lehigh $^	8	–	1	10	–	2
Holy Cross	7	–	2	7	–	5
Colgate	6	–	3	7	–	5
Villanova	6	–	3	7	–	5
Richmond	5	–	4	7	–	5
Fordham	4	–	5	4	–	8
Lafayette	3	–	5	4	–	7
Georgetown	3	–	5	3	–	7
William & Mary	2	–	7	4	–	8
Bucknell	0	–	9	1	–	11
$ – Conference champion; ^ – FCS playoff participant; As of November 22, 2026; Rankings from STATS Poll

The 2026 Holy Cross Crusaders football team represents the College of the Holy Cross as a member of the Patriot League during the 2026 NCAA Division I FCS football season. The Crusaders are led by third-year head coach Dan Curran and played at the Fitton Field in Worcester, Massachusetts.

== Schedule ==
Date	Time	Opponent	Site	TV	Result	Attendance
August 29	3:30 p.m.	No. 11 Lehigh	Fitton Field; Worcester, MA	ESPN+	L 10–35	11,472
September 5	1:00 p.m.	at Colgate	Andy Kerr Stadium; Hamilton, NY	ESPN+	L 10–35	3,059
September 12	1:00 p.m.	at Miami (OH)*	Yager Stadium; Oxford, OH	ESPN+	L 7–45	11,126
September 19	2:00 p.m.	No. 19 Yale*	Fitton Field; Worcester, MA	ESPN+	L 28–38	17,623
September 26	12:30 p.m.	at Lafayette	Fisher Stadium; Easton, PA	ESPN+	W 38–30	3,394
October 3	3:30 p.m.	at William & Mary	Zable Stadium; Williamsburg, VA	ESPN+	W 41–14	8,367
October 17	1:00 p.m.	at No. 17 Harvard*	Harvard Stadium; Boston, MA	ESPN+	L 7–30	6,581
October 24	1:00 p.m.	Bucknell	Fitton Field; Worcester, MA	ESPN+	W 34–3	12,422
October 31	1:00 p.m.	No. 21 Richmond	Fitton Field; Worcester, MA	ESPN+	W 33–14	7,769
November 7	12:30 p.m.	at Georgetown	Cooper Field; Washington, DC	ESPN+	W 27–24	3,150
November 14	12:00 p.m.	Villanova	Fitton Field; Worcester, MA	ESPN+	W 30–27 ^{OT}	10,160
November 21	12:00 p.m.	Fordham	Fitton Field; Worcester, MA (Ram–Crusader Cup)	ESPN+	W 20–10	10,717
*Non-conference game; Rankings from STATS Poll released prior to the game; All times are in Eastern time

== Game summaries ==
=== No. 11 Lehigh ===
No. 11 Lehigh Mountain Hawks (0–0) at Holy Cross Crusaders (0–0) – Game summary

Quarter	1	2	3	4	Total
No. 11 Mountain Hawks	21	0	7	7	35
Crusaders	0	3	0	7	10

at Fitton Field • Worcester, Massachusetts

- Date: August 29
- Game time: 3:30 p.m. EDT
- Game weather: Sunny • Temperature: 76 °F (24 °C) • Wind: SE at 7 miles per hour (11 km/h)
- Game attendance: 11,472
- TV announcers (ESPN+): Kevin Gehl, Kevin Shea and Rachel Hopmayer

Game information

First quarter

- LEH – Hayden Johnson 65-yard run (Connor Poole kick), 12:26. Mountain Hawks 7–0. Drive: 4 plays, 79 yards, 2:28.
- LEH – Luke Yoder 4-yard run (Connor Poole kick), 6:10. Mountain Hawks 14–0. Drive: 9 plays, 61 yards, 5:21.
- LEH – Luke Yoder 33-yard run (Connor Poole kick), 2:51. Mountain Hawks 21–0. Drive: 5 plays, 50 yards, 1:52.

Second quarter

- HC – Owen Saraceno 26-yard field goal, 7:05. Mountain Hawks 21–3. Drive: 9 plays, 51 yards, 3:51.

Third quarter

- LEH – Nick Palumbo 14-yard pass from Hayden Johnson (Connor Poole kick), 7:20. Mountain Hawks 28–3. Drive: 9 plays, 77 yards, 4:48.

Fourth quarter

- HC – Drae Tyme 15-yard pass from David Lynch (Owen Saraceno kick), 14:13. Mountain Hawks 28–10. Drive: 13 plays, 82 yards, 4:26.
- LEH – Luke Yoder 6-yard run (Connor Poole kick), 9:59. Drive: 2 plays, 10 yards, 0:47.

Statistics	LEH	HC
First downs	18	21
Plays–yards	58–398	62–391
Rushes–yards	40–281	22–78
Passing yards	117	313
Passing: comp–att–int	9–18–0	25–40–2
Turnovers	0	3
Time of possession	31:32	28:28

Team	Category	Player	Statistics
Lehigh	Passing	Hayden Johnson	9/18, 117 yards, TD
Lehigh	Rushing	Luke Yoder	21 carries, 130 yards, 3 TD
Lehigh	Receiving	Anthony Feaster	1 reception, 32 yards
Holy Cross	Passing	David Lynch	25/40, 313 yards, TD, 2 INT
Holy Cross	Rushing	Joseph Williams	10 carries, 36 yards
Holy Cross	Receiving	Myles Abernathy	9 receptions, 129 yards, TD

=== at Colgate ===
Holy Cross Crusaders (0–1) at Colgate Raiders (1–0) – Game summary

Quarter	1	2	3	4	Total
Crusaders	3	7	0	0	10
Raiders	14	14	7	0	35

at Andy Kerr Stadium • Hamilton, New York

- Date: September 5
- Game time: 1:00 p.m.
- Game weather: Sunny • Temperature: 68 °F (20 °C) • Wind: NW at 8 miles per hour (13 km/h)
- Game attendance: 3,059
- Referee: Tom Zetts
- TV: ESPN+

Game information

First quarter

- COLG – Matt Fogler 33-yard pass from Jake Stearney (Luke Vogeler kick), 10:57. Raiders 7–0. Drive: 3 plays, 59 yards, 1:14.
- HC – Owen Saraceno 23-yard field goal, 5:57. Raiders 7–3. Drive: 9 plays, 71 yards, 4:56.
- COLG – Matt Fogler 64-yard pass from Jake Stearney (Luke Vogeler kick), 5:12. Raiders 14–3. Drive: 2 plays, 75 yards, 0:45.

Second quarter

- COLG – Danny Shaban 1-yard run (Luke Vogeler kick), 12:51. Raiders 21–3. Drive: 11 plays, 59 yards, 5:33.
- HC – Joseph Williams 7-yard run (Owen Saraceno kick), 2:20. Raiders 21–10. Drive: 14 plays, 84 yards, 5:38.
- COLG – Matt Fogler 18-yard pass from Jake Stearney (Luke Vogeler kick), 0:36. Raiders 28–10. Drive: 8 plays, 72 yards, 1:38.

Third quarter

- COLG – Winston Moore 58-yard pass from Jake Stearney (Luke Vogeler kick), 13:45. Raiders 35–10. Drive: 3 plays, 75 yards, 1:15.

Fourth quarter

- No scoring plays.

Statistics	HC	COLG
First downs	19	18
Plays–yards	70–330	57–442
Rushes–yards	35–66	35–152
Passing yards	264	290
Passing: comp–att–int	19–35–3	14–22–1
Turnovers	3	1
Time of possession	33:29	26:31

Team	Category	Player	Statistics
Holy Cross	Passing	David Lynch	19/35, 264 yards, 3 INT
Holy Cross	Rushing	Joseph Williams	20 carries, 44 yards, TD
Holy Cross	Receiving	Ty Curran	7 receptions, 130 yards
Colgate	Passing	Jake Stearney	13/21, 278 yards, 4 TD, INT
Colgate	Rushing	Danny Shaban	17 carries, 94 yards, TD
Colgate	Receiving	Matt Fogler	6 receptions, 153 yards, 3 TD

=== at Miami (OH) (FBS) ===
Holy Cross Crusaders (0–2) at Miami (OH) RedHawks (FBS) (0–1) – Game summary

Quarter	1	2	3	4	Total
Crusaders	0	0	7	0	7
RedHawks (FBS)	14	28	3	0	45

at Yager Stadium • Oxford, Ohio

- Date: September 12
- Game time: 1:00 p.m.
- Game weather: Rain • Temperature: 76 °F (24 °C) • Wind: N at 4 mph
- Game attendance: 11,126
- Referee: Billy Williams
- TV announcers (ESPN+): Eric Rothman and Brad Hopkins

Game information

First quarter

- M-OH – David McComb 3-yard run (Kellan McLaughlin kick), 9:31. RedHawks 7–0. Drive: 7 plays, 58 yards, 3:52.
- M-OH – Christian Ross 34-yard pass from David McComb (Kellan McLaughlin kick), 2:16. RedHawks 14–0. Drive: 8 plays, 75 yards, 4:45.

Second quarter

- M-OH – D'Shawntae Jones 2-yard run (Kellan McLaughlin kick), 13:35. RedHawks 21–0. Drive: 5 plays, 54 yards, 2:44.
- M-OH – Damarion Witten 10-yard pass from David McComb (Kellan McLaughlin kick), 10:31. RedHawks 28–0. Drive: 3 plays, 58 yards, 1:33.
- M-OH – Leo Colombi 28-yard blocked punt return (Kellan McLaughlin kick), 8:26. RedHawks 35–0.
- M-OH – Lynel Billups-Williams 28-yard pass from David McComb (Kellan McLaughlin kick), 1:11. RedHawks 42–0. Drive: 6 plays, 77 yards, 3:18.

Third quarter

- M-OH – Kellan McLaughlin 24-yard field goal, 5:25. RedHawks 45–0. Drive: 14 plays, 69 yards, 9:35.
- HC – Lincoln Fisher 15-yard pass from David Lynch (Owen Saraceno kick), 0:30. RedHawks 45–7. Drive: 9 plays, 75 yards, 4:55.

Fourth quarter

- No scoring plays.

Statistics	HC	M-OH
First downs	10	25
Plays–yards	44–181	54–437
Rushes–yards	19–40	39–201
Passing yards	141	236
Passing: comp–att–int	13–25–0	14–15–0
Turnovers	0	0
Time of possession	21:41	38:19

Team	Category	Player	Statistics
Holy Cross	Passing	David Lynch	13/25, 141 yards, TD
Holy Cross	Rushing	Datrell Jones	3 carries, 18 yards
Holy Cross	Receiving	SirCharles Gordon	3 receptions, 54 yards
Miami (OH)	Passing	David McComb	13/13, 234 yards, 3 TD
Miami (OH)	Rushing	D'Shawntae Jones	7 carries, 47 yards, TD
Miami (OH)	Receiving	Lynel Billups-Williams	4 receptions, 73 yards, TD

=== No. 19 Yale ===
No. 19 Yale Bulldogs (0–0) at Holy Cross Crusaders (0–3) – Game summary

Quarter	1	2	3	4	Total
No. 19 Bulldogs	-	-	-	-	0
Crusaders	-	-	-	-	0

at Fitton Field • Worcester, MA

- Date: September 19
- Game time: 2:00 p.m. EDT
- TV: ESPN+

Game information

First quarter

Second quarter

Third quarter

Fourth quarter

Statistics	YALE	HC
First downs		
Plays–yards		
Rushes–yards		
Passing yards		
Passing: Comp–Att–Int		
Turnovers		
Time of possession		

Team	Category	Player	Statistics
Yale	Passing		
Yale	Rushing		
Yale	Receiving		
Holy Cross	Passing		
Holy Cross	Rushing		
Holy Cross	Receiving		

=== at Lafayette ===
Holy Cross Crusaders (0–4) at Lafayette Leopards (1–2) – Game summary

Quarter	1	2	3	4	Total
Crusaders	0	0	0	0	0
Leopards	0	0	0	0	0

at Fisher Stadium • Easton, Pennsylvania

- Date: September 26
- Game time: 12:30 p.m.
- TV announcers (ESPN+): Gary Laubach (play-by-play), Mike Joseph (analyst) and Luke Meli (sideline)

Game information

First quarter
Second quarter
Third quarter
Fourth quarter

Statistics	HC	LAF
First downs		
Plays–yards		
Rushes–yards		
Passing yards		
Passing: comp–att–int		
Turnovers		
Time of possession		

Team	Category	Player	Statistics
Holy Cross	Passing		
Holy Cross	Rushing		
Holy Cross	Receiving		
Lafayette	Passing		
Lafayette	Rushing		
Lafayette	Receiving		

=== at William & Mary ===
Holy Cross Crusaders (1–4) at William & Mary Tribe (2–3) – Game summary

Quarter	1	2	3	4	Total
Crusaders	0	0	0	0	0
Tribe	0	0	0	0	0

at Zable Stadium • Williamsburg, Virginia

- Date: October 3
- Game time: 3:30 p.m.

Game information

First quarter
Second quarter
Third quarter
Fourth quarter

Statistics	HC	W&M
First downs		
Plays–yards		
Rushes–yards		
Passing yards		
Passing: comp–att–int		
Turnovers		
Time of possession		

Team	Category	Player	Statistics
Holy Cross	Passing		
Holy Cross	Rushing		
Holy Cross	Receiving		
William & Mary	Passing		
William & Mary	Rushing		
William & Mary	Receiving		

=== at No. 17 Harvard ===
Holy Cross Crusaders (2–4) at No. 17 Harvard Crimson (4–0) – Game summary

Quarter	1	2	3	4	Total
Crusaders	0	7	0	0	7
No. 17 Crimson	7	6	10	7	30

at Harvard Stadium • Boston, Massachusetts

- Date: October 17
- Game time: 1:00 p.m.
- Game weather: Cloudy • Temperature: 58 °F (14 °C) • Wind: NW at 13 miles per hour (21 km/h)
- Game attendance: 6,581
- Referee: Terry Jones
- TV announcers (ESPN+): Alex Vispoli (play-by-play), Tim Murphy (analyst) and Gabby Sartori (sideline)

Game information

First quarter

- HARV – Kise Flannery 1-yard run (Kieran Corr kick), 7:54. Crimson 7–0. Drive: 9 plays, 72 yards, 4:46.

Second quarter

- HARV – Kieran Corr 37-yard field goal, 11:43. Crimson 10–0. Drive: 13 plays, 61 yards, 5:36.
- HC – Joseph Williams 51-yard pass from Jake Croce (Owen Saraceno kick), 9:32. Crimson 10–7. Drive: 4 plays, 73 yards, 2:07.
- HARV – Kieran Corr 37-yard field goal, 0:03. Crimson 13–7. Drive: 11 plays, 64 yards, 3:08.

Third quarter

- HARV – Kieran Corr 42-yard field goal, 2:20. Crimson 16–7. Drive: 9 plays, 65 yards, 4:05.
- HARV – Henry Shoemaker 67-yard pass from Charlie Smith (Kieran Corr kick), 0:00. Crimson 23–7. Drive: 1 play, 67 yards, 0:08.

Fourth quarter

- HARV – Kise Flannery 10-yard run (Kieran Corr kick), 4:37. Crimson 30–7. Drive: 12 plays, 84 yards, 6:07.

Statistics	HC	HARV
First downs	13	24
Plays–yards	52–311	71–461
Rushes–yards	29–140	39–164
Passing yards	171	297
Passing: comp–att–int	12–23–2	19–32–0
Turnovers	2	1
Time of possession	27:48	32:12

Team	Category	Player	Statistics
Holy Cross	Passing	David Lynch	11/22, 120 yards, 2 INT
Holy Cross	Rushing	Joseph Williams	16 carries, 123 yards
Holy Cross	Receiving	Joseph Williams	4 receptions, 87 yards, TD
Harvard	Passing	Charlie Smith	19/32, 297 yards, TD
Harvard	Rushing	Najee Calhoun	13 carries, 43 yards
Harvard	Receiving	Henry Shoemaker	3 receptions, 83 yards, TD

=== Bucknell ===
Bucknell Bison (1–6) at Holy Cross Crusaders (2–5) – Game summary

Quarter	1	2	3	4	Total
Bison	-	-	-	-	0
Crusaders	-	-	-	-	0

at Fitton Field • Worcester, MA

- Date: October 24
- Game time: 1:00 p.m. EDT
- TV: ESPN+

Game information

First quarter

Second quarter

Third quarter

Fourth quarter

Statistics	BUCK	HC
First downs		
Plays–yards		
Rushes–yards		
Passing yards		
Passing: Comp–Att–Int		
Turnovers		
Time of possession		

Team	Category	Player	Statistics
Bucknell	Passing		
Bucknell	Rushing		
Bucknell	Receiving		
Holy Cross	Passing		
Holy Cross	Rushing		
Holy Cross	Receiving		

=== No. 21 Richmond ===
No. 21 Richmond Spiders (6–2) at Holy Cross Crusaders (3–5) – Game summary

Quarter	1	2	3	4	Total
No. 21 Spiders	14	0	0	0	14
Crusaders	7	6	6	14	33

at Fitton Field • Worcester, MA

- Date: October 31
- Game time: 1:00 p.m. EDT
- Game weather: Sunny • Temperature: 52 °F (11 °C) • Wind: NW at 10 miles per hour (16 km/h)
- Game attendance: 7,769
- Referee: Jay Johnson
- TV announcers (ESPN+): Kevin Gehl (play-by-play), Kevin Shea (analyst) and Brittany Mahan (sideline)

Game information

First quarter

- (10:53) RICH - Aziz Foster-Powell 3-yard run, Kyle Bitsko kick (Drive: 7 Plays, 66 yards, 4:00; RICH 7–0)
- (3:51) HC - Joseph Williams 21-yard run, Owen Saraceno kick (Drive: 11 Plays, 61 yards, 6:57; TIED 7–7)
- (0:45) RICH - Ashten Snelsire 11-yard pass to Andreas Hill, Kyle Bitsko kick (Drive: 3 Plays, 16 yards, 1:28; RICH 14–7)

Second quarter

- (7:08) HC - Joseph Williams 3-yard run, Owen Saraceno kick failed (Drive: 8 Plays, 73 yards, 4:33; RICH 14–13)

Third quarter

- (3:13) HC - Jake Croce 2-yard run, two-point conversion failed (Drive: 10 Plays, 96 yards, 5:52; HC 19–14)

Fourth quarter

- (11:04) HC - Joseph Williams 62-yard run, Owen Saraceno kick (Drive: 3 Plays, 80 yards, 1:40; HC 26–14)
- (5:01) HC - Jake Croce 2-yard run, Owen Saraceno kick (Drive: 9 Plays, 66 yards, 5:26; HC 33–14)

Statistics	RICH	HC
First downs	13	23
Plays–yards	49–209	63–415
Rushes–yards	28–128	43–323
Passing yards	81	92
Passing: Comp–Att–Int	9–21–1	11–20–0
Turnovers	1	1
Time of possession	25:35	34:25

Team	Category	Player	Statistics
Richmond	Passing	Ashten Snelsire	9/20, 81 yards, TD, INT
Richmond	Rushing	Aziz Foster-Powell	12 carries, 57 yards, TD
Richmond	Receiving	Andreas Hill	2 receptions, 38 yards, TD
Holy Cross	Passing	David Lynch	11/20, 92 yards
Holy Cross	Rushing	Joseph Williams	19 carries, 206 yards, 3 TD
Holy Cross	Receiving	Lincoln Fisher	2 receptions, 41 yards

=== at Georgetown ===
Holy Cross Crusaders (4–5) at Georgetown Hoyas (3–4) – Game summary

Quarter	1	2	3	4	Total
Crusaders	0	0	0	0	0
Hoyas	0	0	0	0	0

at Cooper Field • Washington, DC

- Date: November 7
- Game time: 12:30 p.m.
- TV: ESPN+

Game information

First quarter
Second quarter
Third quarter
Fourth quarter

Statistics	HC	GTWN
First downs		
Plays–yards		
Rushes–yards		
Passing yards		
Passing: comp–att–int		
Turnovers		
Time of possession		

Team	Category	Player	Statistics
Holy Cross	Passing		
Holy Cross	Rushing		
Holy Cross	Receiving		
Georgetown	Passing		
Georgetown	Rushing		
Georgetown	Receiving		

=== Villanova ===
Villanova Wildcats (6–4) at Holy Cross Crusaders (5–5) – Game summary

Quarter	1	2	Total
Wildcats			0
Crusaders			0

at Fitton Field • Worcester, MA

- Date: November 14
- Game time: 12:00 p.m.

Game information

First quarter
Second quarter
Third quarter
Fourth quarter

Statistics	VILL	HC
First downs		
Plays–yards		
Rushes–yards		
Passing yards		
Passing: comp–att–int		
Turnovers		
Time of possession		

Team	Category	Player	Statistics
Villanova	Passing		
Villanova	Rushing		
Villanova	Receiving		
Holy Cross	Passing		
Holy Cross	Rushing		
Holy Cross	Receiving		

=== Fordham (Ram–Crusader Cup) ===
Fordham Rams (4–7) at Holy Cross Crusaders (6–5) – Game summary

Quarter	1	2	Total
Rams			0
Crusaders			0

at Fitton Field • Worcester, MA

- Date: November 21, 2026
- Game time: 12:00 p.m.
- TV: ESPN+

Game information

First quarter
Second quarter
Third quarter
Fourth quarter

Statistics	FOR	HC
First downs		
Plays–yards		
Rushes–yards		
Passing yards		
Passing: comp–att–int		
Turnovers		
Time of possession		

Team	Category	Player	Statistics
Fordham	Passing		
Fordham	Rushing		
Fordham	Receiving		
Holy Cross	Passing		
Holy Cross	Rushing		
Holy Cross	Receiving		
