= 2026 Fordham Rams football team =

American college football season

2026 Fordham Rams football
- Conference: Patriot League
- Record: 4–8 (4–5 Patriot)
- Head coach: Joe Conlin (8th season)
- Offensive coordinator: Art Asselta (3rd season)
- Defensive coordinator: James Lenahan (1st season)
- Home stadium: Coffey Field

2026 Patriot League football standings
	Conf.			Overall
Team	W		L	W		L
No. 16 Lehigh $^	8	–	1	10	–	2
Holy Cross	7	–	2	7	–	5
Colgate	6	–	3	7	–	5
Villanova	6	–	3	7	–	5
Richmond	5	–	4	7	–	5
Fordham	4	–	5	4	–	8
Lafayette	3	–	5	4	–	7
Georgetown	3	–	5	3	–	7
William & Mary	2	–	7	4	–	8
Bucknell	0	–	9	1	–	11
$ – Conference champion; ^ – FCS playoff participant; As of November 22, 2026; Rankings from STATS Poll

The 2026 Fordham Rams football team will represent Fordham University as a member of the Patriot League during the 2026 NCAA Division I FCS football season. The Rams will be led by ninth-year head coach Joe Conlin and play home games at Coffey Field in The Bronx, New York.

== Schedule ==
Date	Time	Opponent	Site	TV	Result	Attendance
August 28	6:00 p.m.	Colgate	Coffey Field; The Bronx, NY	ESPN+	L 14–24	2,521
September 5	3:30 p.m.	at North Dakota State*	Fargodome; Fargo, ND	MW+	L 0–38	15,212
September 12	7:30 p.m.	at Coastal Carolina*	Brooks Stadium; Conway, SC	ESPN+	L 7–45	22,273
September 19	6:00 p.m.	at No. 21 William & Mary	Zable Stadium; Williamsburg, VA	ESPN+	W 52–27	11,743
September 26	1:00 p.m.	Stony Brook*^{†}	Coffey Field; The Bronx, NY	ESPN+	L 16–31	2,237
October 3	12:00 p.m.	at No. 6 Lehigh	Goodman Stadium; Bethlehem, PA	ESPN+	L 0–34	5,033
October 10	3:30 p.m.	No. 19 Richmond	Coffey Field; The Bronx, NY	ESPN+	W 20–14	1,825
October 17	3:30 p.m.	Villanova	Coffey Field; The Bronx, NY	ESPN+	L 17–38	2,369
October 24	1:00 p.m.	Lafayette	Coffey Field; The Bronx, NY	ESPN+	L 17–31	4,107
November 7	1:00 p.m.	at Bucknell	Christy Mathewson–Memorial Stadium; Lewisburg, PA	ESPN+	W 38–13	853
November 14	12:00 p.m.	Georgetown	Coffey Field; The Bronx, NY	ESPN+	W 37–15	1,323
November 21	12:00 p.m.	at Holy Cross	Fitton Field; Worcester, MA (Ram–Crusader Cup)	ESPN+	L 10–20	10,717
*Non-conference game; ^{†}Homecoming; Rankings from STATS Poll released prior to the game; All times are in Eastern time

== Game summaries ==
=== Colgate ===
Colgate Raiders (0–0) at Fordham Rams (0–0) – Game summary

Quarter	1	2	3	4	Total
Raiders	7	7	0	10	24
Rams	0	0	14	0	14

at Coffey Field • The Bronx, New York

- Date: August 28, 2026
- Game time: 6:00 p.m.
- Game weather: Cloudy • Temperature: 84 °F (29 °C) • Wind: NW at 7 miles per hour (11 km/h)
- Game attendance: 2,521
- Referee: Antonio Marcella
- TV announcers (ESPN+): Andrew Bogusch and Andrew Posadas
- Box score, Recap

Game information

First quarter

- COLG – Danny Shaban 1-yard run (Luke Vogeler kick), 4:43. Raiders 7–0. Drive: 10 plays, 62 yards, 5:24.

Second quarter

- COLG – Jake Stearney 8-yard run (Luke Vogeler kick), 4:27. Raiders 14–0. Drive: 16 plays, 98 yards, 9:21.

Third quarter

- FOR – Ricky Gonzalez II 24-yard pass from Gunnar Smith (Bennett Henderson kick), 12:32. Raiders 14–7. Drive: 3 plays, 25 yards, 1:02.
- FOR – Justin Johnson 23-yard interception return (Bennett Henderson kick), 8:08. Tied 14–14.

Fourth quarter

- COLG – Luke Vogeler 37-yard field goal, 7:23. Raiders 17–14. Drive: 7 plays, 46 yards, 3:32.
- COLG – Danny Shaban 29-yard run (Luke Vogeler kick), 1:53. Raiders 24–14. Drive: 6 plays, 60 yards, 3:52.

Statistics	COLG	FOR
First downs	25	11
Plays–yards	75–434	48–189
Rushes–yards	46–275	21–73
Passing yards	159	116
Passing: comp–att–int	19–29–2	13–27–0
Turnovers	3	0
Time of possession	37:42	22:18

Team	Category	Player	Statistics
Colgate	Passing	Jake Stearney	19/29, 159 yards, 2 INT
Colgate	Rushing	Danny Shaban	28 carries, 214 yards, 2 TD
Colgate	Receiving	Matt Fogler	4 receptions, 45 yards
Fordham	Passing	Gunnar Smith	13/27, 116 yards, TD
Fordham	Rushing	Yohan-Li Louis	7 carries, 37 yards
Fordham	Receiving	Ricky Gonzalez II	2 receptions, 37 yards, TD

=== at North Dakota State (FBS) ===
Fordham Rams (0–1) at North Dakota State Bison (FBS) (1–0) – Game summary

Quarter	1	2	3	4	Total
Rams	0	0	0	0	0
Bison (FBS)	3	14	21	0	38

at Fargodome, Fargo, ND

- Date: September 5, 2026
- Game time: 3:30 p.m.
- Game weather: Indoors; 70 °F (21 °C)
- Game attendance: 15,212
- Referee: Cal McNeill
- TV: MW+
- Box score, Recap

Game information

First quarter

- NDSU – Drew Klein 39-yard field goal, 7:01. Bison 3–0. Drive: 16 plays, 58 yards, 7:43.

Second quarter

- NDSU – DJ Scott 3-yard run (Drew Klein kick), 14:56. Bison 10–0. Drive: 7 plays, 65 yards, 3:25.
- NDSU – Chris Kiel 8-yard pass from Nathan Hayes (Drew Klein kick), 0:55. Bison 17–0. Drive: 9 plays, 80 yards, 1:24.

Third quarter

- NDSU – Marion Moore 37-yard interception return (Drew Klein kick), 13:56. Bison 24–0.
- NDSU – DJ Scott 7-yard run (Drew Klein kick), 10:51. Bison 31–0. Drive: 2 plays, 15 yards, 0:55.
- NDSU – Mekhi Collins 12-yard pass from Nathan Hayes (Drew Klein kick), 4:28. Bison 38–0. Drive: 9 plays, 59 yards, 4:37.

Fourth quarter

- No scoring plays.

Statistics	FOR	NDSU
First downs	9	22
Plays–yards	48–135	69–373
Rushes–yards	26–19	43–128
Passing yards	116	245
Passing: comp–att–int	12–22–3	21–26–0
Turnovers	3	0
Time of possession	26:33	33:27

Team	Category	Player	Statistics
Fordham	Passing	Gunnar Smith	12/26, 116 yards, 3 INT
Fordham	Rushing	Yohan-Li Louis	9 carries, 23 yards
Fordham	Receiving	John Morris	3 receptions, 37 yards
North Dakota State	Passing	Nathan Hayes	18/22, 210 yards, 2 TD
North Dakota State	Rushing	DJ Scott	11 carries, 60 yards, 2 TD
North Dakota State	Receiving	Chris Kiel	4 receptions, 50 yards, TD

=== at Coastal Carolina (FBS) ===
Fordham Rams (0–2) at Coastal Carolina Chanticleers (FBS) (0–1) – Game summary

Quarter	1	2	3	4	Total
Rams	0	7	0	0	7
Chanticleers (FBS)	7	21	10	7	45

at Brooks Stadium • Conway, South Carolina

- Date: September 12, 2026
- Game time: 7:30 p.m.
- Game weather: Sunny • Temperature: 82 °F (28 °C) • Wind: N at 8 miles per hour (13 km/h)
- Game attendance: 18,113
- Referee: Chris Brison
- TV announcers (ESPN+): Dom Izzo and Kyle Emanuel
- Box score, Recap

Game information

First quarter

- CCU – Dominic Lee-Knicely 5-yard run (Nico Cavanillas Alti kick), 10:09. Chanticleers 7–0. Drive: 10 plays, 75 yards, 4:51.

Second quarter

- FORD – Nodin Tracy 6-yard pass from Gunnar Smith (Bennett Henderson kick), 13:09. Tied 7–7. Drive: 9 plays, 51 yards, 4:58.
- CCU – Colton Hinton 65-yard pass from Deuce Bailey (Nico Cavanillas Alti kick), 11:11. Chanticleers 14–7. Drive: 4 plays, 78 yards, 1:53.
- CCU – Robby Washington 23-yard pass from Deuce Bailey (Nico Cavanillas Alti kick), 5:01. Chanticleers 21–7. Drive: 3 plays, 36 yards, 1:25.
- CCU – Clayton Coppock Jr. 12-yard pass from Deuce Bailey (Nico Cavanillas Alti kick), 0:39. Chanticleers 28–7. Drive: 2 plays, 16 yards, 0:08.

Third quarter

- CCU – Dominic Lee-Knicely 18-yard run (Nico Cavanillas Alti kick), 9:15. Chanticleers 35–7. Drive: 9 plays, 81 yards, 3:31.
- CCU – Nico Cavanillas Alti 56-yard field goal, 0:15. Chanticleers 38–7. Drive: 6 plays, 21 yards, 2:02.

Fourth quarter

- CCU – Jaden Allen-Hendrix 5-yard run (Nico Cavanillas Alti kick), 10:57. Chanticleers 45–7. Drive: 5 plays, 32 yards, 2:47.

Statistics	FOR	CCU
First downs	11	23
Plays–yards	54–215	69–460
Rushes–yards	33–114	41–251
Passing yards	101	209
Passing: comp–att–int	9–21–3	13–28–0
Turnovers	4	0
Time of possession	30:05	29:55

Team	Category	Player	Statistics
Fordham	Passing	Gunnar Smith	9/20, 101 yards, TD, 2 INT
Fordham	Rushing	Gunnar Smith	11 carries, 40 yards
Fordham	Receiving	Nodin Tracy	4 receptions, 56 yards, TD
Coastal Carolina	Passing	Deuce Bailey	12/25, 203 yards, 3 TD
Coastal Carolina	Rushing	Jaden Allen-Hendrix	7 carries, 58 yards, TD
Coastal Carolina	Receiving	Colton Hinton	3 receptions, 101 yards, TD

=== at No. 21 William & Mary ===
Fordham Rams (0–3) at No. 21 William & Mary Tribe (2–1) – Game summary

Quarter	1	2	3	4	Total
Rams	14	14	10	14	52
No. 21 Tribe	0	7	7	13	27

at Zable Stadium • Williamsburg, Virginia

- Date: September 19, 2026
- Game time: 6:00 p.m.
- Game weather: Sunny • Temperature: 78 °F (26 °C)
- Game attendance: 11,743
- Referee: Bill McKeever
- TV announcers (ESPN+): Jay Colley and Gareth Hissong
- Box score, Recap

Game information

First quarter

- FOR – KJ Reed 18-yard pass from Gunnar Smith (Bennett Henderson kick), 6:58. Rams 7–0. Drive: 8 plays, 84 yards, 2:46.
- FOR – Jamell James 5-yard run (Bennett Henderson kick), 1:02. Rams 14–0. Drive: 5 plays, 29 yards, 2:23.

Second quarter

- FOR – John Morris 10-yard pass from Gunnar Smith (Bennett Henderson kick), 14:54. Rams 21–0. Drive: 3 plays, 20 yards, 1:02.
- W&M – Andrew King 67-yard run (Max Lipinski kick), 14:09. Rams 21–7. Drive: 2 plays, 76 yards, 0:39.
- FOR – Nodin Tracy 14-yard pass from Gunnar Smith (Bennett Henderson kick), 0:32. Rams 28–7. Drive: 9 plays, 64 yards, 4:30.

Third quarter

- FOR – Bennett Henderson 19-yard field goal, 10:12. Rams 31–7. Drive: 8 plays, 70 yards, 3:43.
- W&M – Jacob Mullins 16-yard pass from Winston Watkins (Max Lipinski kick), 4:07. Rams 31–14. Drive: 14 plays, 84 yards, 6:00.
- FOR – Jamell James 12-yard run (Bennett Henderson kick), 2:44. Rams 38–14. Drive: 3 plays, 75 yards, 1:23.

Fourth quarter

- W&M – Kai Austin 27-yard pass from Winston Watkins (pass failed), 14:52. Rams 38–20. Drive: 8 plays, 75 yards, 2:52.
- FOR – Yohan-Li Louis 57-yard run (Bennett Henderson kick), 11:52. Rams 45–20. Drive: 5 plays, 75 yards, 3:00.
- FOR – Jamell James 10-yard run (Bennett Henderson kick), 3:26. Rams 52–20. Drive: 7 plays, 58 yards, 3:52.
- W&M – Patrick Blee 1-yard run (Max Lipinski kick), 1:16. Rams 52–27. Drive: 7 plays, 75 yards, 2:10.

Statistics	FOR	W&M
First downs	27	20
Plays–yards	67–569	66–423
Rushes–yards	46–428	40–137
Passing yards	141	286
Passing: comp–att–int	12–21–0	19–26–0
Turnovers	0	2
Time of possession	34:13	25:17

Team	Category	Player	Statistics
Fordham	Passing	Gunnar Smith	12/21, 141 yards, 3 TD
Fordham	Rushing	Yohan-Li Louis	15 carries, 203 yards, TD
Fordham	Receiving	Ricky Gonzalez II	2 receptions, 41 yards
William & Mary	Passing	Winston Watkins	19/26, 286 yards, 2 TD
William & Mary	Rushing	Andrew King	16 carries, 122 yards, TD
William & Mary	Receiving	Kai Austin	6 receptions, 81 yards, TD

=== Stony Brook ===
Stony Brook Seawolves (2–2) at Fordham Rams (1–3) – Game summary

Quarter	1	2	3	4	Total
Seawolves	7	14	0	10	31
Rams	7	6	3	0	16

at Coffey Field • The Bronx, New York

- Date: September 26, 2026
- Game time: 1:00 p.m.
- Game weather: Cloudy • Temperature: 58 °F (14 °C) • Wind: NE at 8 miles per hour (13 km/h)
- Game attendance: 2,237
- Referee: Anthony Florio
- TV announcers (ESPN+): Andrew Bogusch and Andrew Posadas
- Box score, Recap

Game information

First quarter

- STBK – CJ Hester 5-yard run (Michael Mannino kick), 9:36. Seawolves 7–0. Drive: 11 plays, 70 yards, 5:24.
- FOR – Jamell James 54-yard run (Bennett Henderson kick), 5:49. Tied 7–7. Drive: 7 plays, 74 yards, 3:41.

Second quarter

- STBK – Rayden Aphayvong 15-yard pass from Quinn Boyd (Michael Mannino kick), 10:11. Seawolves 14–7. Drive: 4 plays, 38 yards, 0:56.
- FOR – Gunnar Smith 34-yard run (Bennett Henderson PAT failed), 5:50. Seawolves 14–13. Drive: 8 plays, 75 yards, 4:21.
- STBK – CJ Hester 7-yard run (Michael Mannino kick), 0:38. Seawolves 21–13. Drive: 12 plays, 80 yards, 3:50.

Third quarter

- FOR – Bennett Henderson 37-yard field goal, 5:28. Seawolves 21–16. Drive: 10 plays, 30 yards, 4:42.

Fourth quarter

- STBK – Michael Mannino 30-yard field goal, 13:34. Seawolves 24–16. Drive: 7 plays, 53 yards, 3:02.
- FOR – CJ Hester 11-yard run (Michael Mannino kick), 8:00. Seawolves 31–16. Drive: 7 plays, 47 yards, 3:14.

Statistics	STBK	FOR
First downs	19	14
Plays–yards	69–396	58–314
Rushes–yards	43–187	35–169
Passing yards	209	145
Passing: comp–att–int	20–26–0	15–23–1
Turnovers	1	2
Time of possession	31:38	28:22

Team	Category	Player	Statistics
Stony Brook	Passing	Quinn Boyd	20/26, 209 yards, TD
Stony Brook	Rushing	CJ Hester	28 carries, 135 yards, 3 TD
Stony Brook	Receiving	DJ Linkins	5 receptions, 81 yards
Fordham	Passing	Gunnar Smith	15/23, 145 yards, INT
Fordham	Rushing	Jamell James	14 carries, 114 yards, TD
Fordham	Receiving	Ricky Gonzalez II	3 receptions, 67 yards

=== at No. 6 Lehigh ===
Fordham Rams (1–4) at No. 6 Lehigh Mountain Hawks (5–0) – Game summary

Quarter	1	2	3	4	Total
Rams	0	0	0	0	0
No. 6 Mountain Hawks	0	31	3	0	34

at Goodman Stadium • Bethlehem, Pennsylvania

- Date: October 3, 2026
- Game time: 12:00 p.m.
- Game weather: Sunny
- Game attendance: 5,033
- Referee: Jeremy DeAngulo
- TV announcers (ESPN+): Marco Socci and Lance Haynes
- Box score, Recap

Game information

First quarter

- No scoring plays.

Second quarter

- LEH – Anthony Feaster 30-yard pass from Derek Morgan (Connor Poole kick), 13:32. Mountain Hawks 7–0. Drive: 11 plays, 98 yards, 5:44.
- LEH – Aiden Schomp 10-yard pass from Derek Morgan (Connor Poole kick), 2:50. Mountain Hawks 14–0. Drive: 6 plays, 55 yards, 4:08.
- LEH – Luke Yoder 10-yard run (Connor Poole kick), 0:44. Mountain Hawks 21–0. Drive: 6 plays, 30 yards, 2:00.
- LEH – Anthony Feaster 29-yard pass from Derek Morgan (Connor Poole kick), 0:19. Mountain Hawks 28–0. Drive: 1 plays, 29 yards, 0:05.
- LEH – Connor Poole 26-yard field goal, 0:00. Mountain Hawks 31–0. Drive: 2 plays, 0 yards, 0:06.

Third quarter

- LEH – Connor Poole 29-yard field goal, 8:42. Mountain Hawks 34–0. Drive: 4 plays, 3 yards, 2:04.

Fourth quarter

- No scoring plays.

Statistics	FOR	LEH
First downs	18	16
Plays–yards	68–255	58–392
Rushes–yards	21–42	37–240
Passing yards	213	152
Passing: comp–att–int	25–47–3	10–21–0
Turnovers	5	0
Time of possession	28:29	31:31

Team	Category	Player	Statistics
Fordham	Passing	Gunnar Smith	22/44, 190 yards, 3 INT
Fordham	Rushing	Jamell James	5 carries, 10 yards
Fordham	Receiving	Ricky Gonzalez II	8 receptions, 56 yards
Lehigh	Passing	Derek Morgan	10/20, 152 yards, 3 TD
Lehigh	Rushing	Luke Yoder	20 carries, 171 yards, TD
Lehigh	Receiving	Anthony Feaster	3 receptions, 67 yards, 2 TD

=== No. 19 Richmond ===
No. 19 Richmond Spiders (5–1) at Fordham Rams (1–5) – Game summary

Quarter	1	2	3	4	Total
No. 19 Spiders	0	7	7	0	14
Rams	7	0	7	6	20

at Coffey Field • The Bronx, New York

- Date: October 10, 2026
- Game time: 3:30 p.m.
- Game weather: Cloudy • Temperature: 69 °F (21 °C) • Wind: E at 4 miles per hour (6.4 km/h)
- Game attendance: 1,825
- Referee: Alexander Randolph
- TV announcers (ESPN+): Andrew Bogusch and Andrew Posadas
- Box score, Recap

Game information

First quarter

- (11:07) FOR - Gunnar Smith 10-yard pass to Ricky Gonzalez II, Bennett Henderson kick (Drive: 9 Plays, 76 yards, 3:47; FOR 7–0)

Second quarter

- (14:12) RICH - Ashten Snelsire 6-yard pass to Bryce Allen, Kyle Bitsko kick (Drive: 14 Plays, 86 yards, 8:31; TIED 7–7)

Third quarter

- (11:59) RICH - Jordan Allen 0-yard fumble recovery, Kyle Bitsko kick (RICH 14–7)
- (4:36) FOR - Jamell James 2-yard run, Bennett Henderson kick (Drive: 5 Plays, 50 yards, 2:45; TIED 14–14)

Fourth quarter

- (2:23) FOR - Gunnar Smith 5-yard run, Bennett Henderson kick failed (Drive: 12 Plays, 62 yards, 5:47; FOR 20–14)

Statistics	RICH	FOR
First downs	13	18
Plays–yards	63–204	60–258
Rushes–yards	24–82	35–160
Passing yards	122	98
Passing: comp–att–int	24–39–1	13–25–1
Turnovers	2	3
Time of possession	31:03	28:57

Team	Category	Player	Statistics
Richmond	Passing	Ashten Snelsire	24/39, 122 yards, INT
Richmond	Rushing	Aziz Foster-Powell	12 carries, 68 yards
Richmond	Receiving	Sean Clarke	6 receptions, 34 yards
Fordham	Passing	Gunnar Smith	13/25, 98 yards, TD, INT
Fordham	Rushing	Jamell James	15 carries, 80 yards
Fordham	Receiving	KJ Reed	4 receptions, 42 yards

=== Villanova ===
Villanova Wildcats (2–4) at Fordham Rams (2–5) – Game summary

Quarter	1	2	Total
Wildcats			0
Rams			0

at Coffey Field • The Bronx, New York

- Date: October 17, 2026
- Game time: 3:30 p.m.
- TV: ESPN+

Game information

First quarter
Second quarter
Third quarter
Fourth quarter

Statistics	VILL	FOR
First downs		
Plays–yards		
Rushes–yards		
Passing yards		
Passing: comp–att–int		
Turnovers		
Time of possession		

Team	Category	Player	Statistics
Villanova	Passing		
Villanova	Rushing		
Villanova	Receiving		
Fordham	Passing		
Fordham	Rushing		
Fordham	Receiving		

=== Lafayette ===
Lafayette Leopards (2–4) at Fordham Rams (2–6) – Game summary

Quarter	1	2	Total
Leopards			0
Rams			0

at Coffey Field • The Bronx, New York

- Date: October 24, 2026
- Game time: 1:00 p.m.
- TV: ESPN+

Game information

First quarter
Second quarter
Third quarter
Fourth quarter

Statistics	LAF	FOR
First downs		
Plays–yards		
Rushes–yards		
Passing yards		
Passing: comp–att–int		
Turnovers		
Time of possession		

Team	Category	Player	Statistics
Lafayette	Passing		
Lafayette	Rushing		
Lafayette	Receiving		
Fordham	Passing		
Fordham	Rushing		
Fordham	Receiving		

=== at Bucknell ===
Fordham Rams (2–7) at Bucknell Bison (1–8) – Game summary

Quarter	1	2	Total
Rams			0
Bison			0

at Christy Mathewson–Memorial Stadium • Lewisburg, Pennsylvania

- Date: November 7, 2026
- Game time: 1:00 p.m.
- TV: ESPN+

Game information

First quarter
Second quarter
Third quarter
Fourth quarter

Statistics	FOR	BUCK
First downs		
Plays–yards		
Rushes–yards		
Passing yards		
Passing: comp–att–int		
Turnovers		
Time of possession		

Team	Category	Player	Statistics
Fordham	Passing		
Fordham	Rushing		
Fordham	Receiving		
Bucknell	Passing		
Bucknell	Rushing		
Bucknell	Receiving		

=== Georgetown ===
Georgetown Hoyas (3–5) at Fordham Rams (3–7) – Game summary

Quarter	1	2	Total
Hoyas			0
Rams			0

at Coffey Field • The Bronx, New York

- Date: October 14, 2026
- Game time: 12:00 p.m.
- TV: ESPN+

Game information

First quarter
Second quarter
Third quarter
Fourth quarter

Statistics	GTWN	FOR
First downs		
Plays–yards		
Rushes–yards		
Passing yards		
Passing: comp–att–int		
Turnovers		
Time of possession		

Team	Category	Player	Statistics
Georgetown	Passing		
Georgetown	Rushing		
Georgetown	Receiving		
Fordham	Passing		
Fordham	Rushing		
Fordham	Receiving		

=== at Holy Cross (Ram–Crusader Cup) ===
Fordham Rams (4–7) at Holy Cross Crusaders (6–5) – Game summary

Quarter	1	2	Total
Rams			0
Crusaders			0

at Fitton Field • Worcester, Massachusetts

- Date: November 21, 2026
- Game time: 12:00 p.m.
- TV: ESPN+

Game information

First quarter
Second quarter
Third quarter
Fourth quarter

Statistics	FOR	HC
First downs		
Plays–yards		
Rushes–yards		
Passing yards		
Passing: comp–att–int		
Turnovers		
Time of possession		

Team	Category	Player	Statistics
Fordham	Passing		
Fordham	Rushing		
Fordham	Receiving		
Holy Cross	Passing		
Holy Cross	Rushing		
Holy Cross	Receiving		
