= 2026 Colgate Raiders football team =

American college football season

2026 Colgate Raiders football
- Conference: Patriot League
- Record: 7–5 (6–3 Patriot)
- Head coach: Curt Fitzpatrick (2nd season)
- Defensive coordinator: Trevor Warner (2nd season)
- Home stadium: Crown Field at Andy Kerr Stadium

2026 Patriot League football standings
	Conf.			Overall
Team	W		L	W		L
No. 16 Lehigh $^	8	–	1	10	–	2
Holy Cross	7	–	2	7	–	5
Colgate	6	–	3	7	–	5
Villanova	6	–	3	7	–	5
Richmond	5	–	4	7	–	5
Fordham	4	–	5	4	–	8
Lafayette	3	–	5	4	–	7
Georgetown	3	–	5	3	–	7
William & Mary	2	–	7	4	–	8
Bucknell	0	–	9	1	–	11
$ – Conference champion; ^ – FCS playoff participant; As of November 22, 2026; Rankings from STATS Poll

The 2026 Colgate Raiders football team represent Colgate University as a member of the Patriot League during the 2026 NCAA Division I FCS football season. The Raiders are led by second-year head coach Curt Fitzpatrick and play at the Crown Field at Andy Kerr Stadium in Hamilton, New York.

== Schedule ==
Date	Time	Opponent	Rank	Site	TV	Result	Attendance
August 28	6:00 p.m.	at Fordham		Coffey Field; The Bronx, NY	ESPN+	W 24–14	2,521
September 5	1:00 p.m.	Holy Cross		Andy Kerr Stadium; Hamilton, NY	ESPN+	W 35–10	3,059
September 12	1:00 p.m.	at Central Michigan*		Kelly/Shorts Stadium; Mount Pleasant, MI	ESPN+	L 10–13	19,005
September 19	1:00 p.m.	Cornell*		Andy Kerr Stadium; Hamilton, NY (rivalry)	ESPN+	W 20–7	5,287
September 26	2:00 p.m.	at No. 23 Villanova		Villanova Stadium; Villanova, PA	ESPN+	W 28–21	6,753
October 3	7:00 p.m.	at No. 20 Harvard*	No. 22	Harvard Stadium; Boston, MA	ESPN+	L 17–20	9,100
October 17	1:00 p.m.	Georgetown	No. 22	Andy Kerr Stadium; Hamilton, NY	ESPN+	L 17–27	2,369
October 24	2:00 p.m.	at No. 25 Richmond		E. Claiborne Robins Stadium; Richmond, VA	ESPN+	L 6–13	5,519
October 31	1:00 p.m.	William & Mary		Andy Kerr Stadium; Hamilton, NY	ESPN+	W 37–0	1,635
November 7	12:00 p.m.	at No. 17 Lehigh		Goodman Stadium; Bethlehem, PA	ESPN+	L 7–33	4,881
November 14	1:00 p.m.	Lafayette		Andy Kerr Stadium; Hamilton, NY	ESPN+	W 19–7	1,188
November 21	1:00 p.m.	at Bucknell		Christy Mathewson-Memorial Stadium; Lewisburg, PA	ESPN+	W 21–20	637
*Non-conference game; Rankings from STATS Poll released prior to the game; All times are in Eastern time

== Game summaries ==
=== at Fordham ===
Colgate Raiders (0–0) at Fordham Rams (0–0) – Game summary

Quarter	1	2	3	4	Total
Raiders	7	7	0	10	24
Rams	0	0	14	0	14

at Coffey Field • The Bronx, New York

- Date: August 28, 2026
- Game time: 6:00 p.m.
- Game weather: Cloudy • Temperature: 84 °F (29 °C) • Wind: NW at 7 miles per hour (11 km/h)
- Game attendance: 2,521
- Referee: Antonio Marcella
- TV announcers (ESPN+): Andrew Bogusch and Andrew Posadas

Game information

First quarter

- COLG – Danny Shaban 1-yard run (Luke Vogeler kick), 4:43. Raiders 7–0. Drive: 10 plays, 62 yards, 5:24.

Second quarter

- COLG – Jake Stearney 8-yard run (Luke Vogeler kick), 4:27. Raiders 14–0. Drive: 16 plays, 98 yards, 9:21.

Third quarter

- FOR – Ricky Gonzalez II 24-yard pass from Gunnar Smith (Bennett Henderson kick), 12:32. Raiders 14–7. Drive: 3 plays, 25 yards, 1:02.
- FOR – Justin Johnson 23-yard interception return (Bennett Henderson kick), 8:08. Tied 14–14.

Fourth quarter

- COLG – Luke Vogeler 37-yard field goal, 7:23. Raiders 17–14. Drive: 7 plays, 46 yards, 3:32.
- COLG – Danny Shaban 29-yard run (Luke Vogeler kick), 1:53. Raiders 24–14. Drive: 6 plays, 60 yards, 3:52.

Statistics	COLG	FOR
First downs	25	11
Plays–yards	75–434	48–189
Rushes–yards	46–275	21–73
Passing yards	159	116
Passing: comp–att–int	19–29–2	13–27–0
Turnovers	3	0
Time of possession	37:42	22:18

Team	Category	Player	Statistics
Colgate	Passing	Jake Stearney	19/29, 159 yards, 2 INT
Colgate	Rushing	Danny Shaban	28 carries, 214 yards, 2 TD
Colgate	Receiving	Matt Fogler	4 receptions, 45 yards
Fordham	Passing	Gunnar Smith	13/27, 116 yards, TD
Fordham	Rushing	Yohan-Li Louis	7 carries, 37 yards
Fordham	Receiving	Ricky Gonzalez II	2 receptions, 37 yards, TD

=== Holy Cross ===
Holy Cross Crusaders (0–1) at Colgate Raiders (1–0) – Game summary

Quarter	1	2	3	4	Total
Crusaders	3	7	0	0	10
Raiders	14	14	7	0	35

at Andy Kerr Stadium • Hamilton, New York

- Date: September 5
- Game time: 1:00 p.m.
- Game weather: Sunny • Temperature: 68 °F (20 °C) • Wind: NW at 8 miles per hour (13 km/h)
- Game attendance: 3,059
- Referee: Tom Zetts
- TV: ESPN+

Game information

First quarter

- COLG – Matt Fogler 33-yard pass from Jake Stearney (Luke Vogeler kick), 10:57. Raiders 7–0. Drive: 3 plays, 59 yards, 1:14.
- HC – Owen Saraceno 23-yard field goal, 5:57. Raiders 7–3. Drive: 9 plays, 71 yards, 4:56.
- COLG – Matt Fogler 64-yard pass from Jake Stearney (Luke Vogeler kick), 5:12. Raiders 14–3. Drive: 2 plays, 75 yards, 0:45.

Second quarter

- COLG – Danny Shaban 1-yard run (Luke Vogeler kick), 12:51. Raiders 21–3. Drive: 11 plays, 59 yards, 5:33.
- HC – Joseph Williams 7-yard run (Owen Saraceno kick), 2:20. Raiders 21–10. Drive: 14 plays, 84 yards, 5:38.
- COLG – Matt Fogler 18-yard pass from Jake Stearney (Luke Vogeler kick), 0:36. Raiders 28–10. Drive: 8 plays, 72 yards, 1:38.

Third quarter

- COLG – Winston Moore 58-yard pass from Jake Stearney (Luke Vogeler kick), 13:45. Raiders 35–10. Drive: 3 plays, 75 yards, 1:15.

Fourth quarter

- No scoring plays.

Statistics	HC	COLG
First downs	19	18
Plays–yards	70–330	57–442
Rushes–yards	35–66	35–152
Passing yards	264	290
Passing: comp–att–int	19–35–3	14–22–1
Turnovers	3	1
Time of possession	33:29	26:31

Team	Category	Player	Statistics
Holy Cross	Passing	David Lynch	19/35, 264 yards, 3 INT
Holy Cross	Rushing	Joseph Williams	20 carries, 44 yards, TD
Holy Cross	Receiving	Ty Curran	7 receptions, 130 yards
Colgate	Passing	Jake Stearney	13/21, 278 yards, 4 TD, INT
Colgate	Rushing	Danny Shaban	17 carries, 94 yards, TD
Colgate	Receiving	Matt Fogler	6 receptions, 153 yards, 3 TD

=== at Central Michigan (FBS) ===
Colgate Raiders (2–0) at Central Michigan Chippewas (FBS) (0–1) – Game summary

Quarter	1	2	3	4	Total
Raiders	0	10	0	0	10
Chippewas (FBS)	0	0	6	7	13

at Kelly/Shorts Stadium • Mount Pleasant, Michigan

- Date: September 12
- Game time: 1:00 p.m.
- Game weather: Sunny • Temperature: 76 °F (24 °C) • Wind: NE at 8 miles per hour (13 km/h)
- Game attendance: 19,005
- Referee: Rich Edwards
- TV announcers (ESPN+): Dan Gutowsky and Ahman Green

Game information

First quarter

- No scoring plays.

Second quarter

- COLG – Jake Stearney 3-yard run (Luke Vogeler kick), 11:48. Raiders 7–0. Drive: 11 plays, 42 yards, 4:46.
- COLG – Luke Vogeler 48-yard field goal, 0:36. Raiders 10–0. Drive: 4 plays, 4 yards, 0:38.

Third quarter

- CMU – Angel Flores 50-yard run (Caden VanHuis kick BLOCKED), 0:24. Raiders 10–6. Drive: 10 plays, 87 yards, 5:23.

Fourth quarter

- CMU – Vaughn Blue 6-yard run (Caden VanHuis kick), 7:29. Chippewas 13–10. Drive: 9 plays, 65 yards, 4:30.

Statistics	COLG	CMU
First downs	15	16
Plays–yards	62–219	63–276
Rushes–yards	31–95	42–200
Passing yards	124	76
Passing: comp–att–int	16–31–2	10–21–2
Turnovers	4	3
Time of possession	27:19	32:41

Team	Category	Player	Statistics
Colgate	Passing	Jake Stearney	16/31, 124 yards, 2 INT
Colgate	Rushing	Danny Shaban	22 carries, 87 yards
Colgate	Receiving	Kam Phillips	3 receptions, 43 yards
Central Michigan	Passing	Angel Flores	7/13, 57 yards, INT
Central Michigan	Rushing	Angel Flores	22 carries, 122 yards, TD
Central Michigan	Receiving	Vaughn Blue	3 receptions, 29 yards

=== Cornell (rivalry) ===
Cornell Big Red (0–0) at Colgate Raiders (2–1) – Game summary

Quarter	1	2	3	4	Total
Big Red	0	0	0	0	0
Raiders	0	0	0	0	0

at Andy Kerr Stadium • Hamilton, New York

- Date: September 19
- Game time: 1:00 p.m.
- TV: ESPN+

Game information

First quarter
Second quarter
Third quarter
Fourth quarter

Statistics	COR	COLG
First downs		
Plays–yards		
Rushes–yards		
Passing yards		
Passing: comp–att–int		
Turnovers		
Time of possession		

Team	Category	Player	Statistics
Cornell	Passing		
Cornell	Rushing		
Cornell	Receiving		
Colgate	Passing		
Colgate	Rushing		
Colgate	Receiving		

=== at No. 23 Villanova ===
Colgate Raiders (3–1) at No. 23 Villanova Wildcats (2–2) – Game summary

Quarter	1	2	Total
Raiders			0
No. 23 Wildcats			0

at Villanova Stadium • Villanova, Pennsylvania

- Date: September 26
- Game time: 2:00 p.m.
- TV: ESPN+

Game information

First quarter
Second quarter
Third quarter
Fourth quarter

Statistics	COLG	VILL
First downs		
Plays–yards		
Rushes–yards		
Passing yards		
Passing: comp–att–int		
Turnovers		
Time of possession		

Team	Category	Player	Statistics
Colgate	Passing		
Colgate	Rushing		
Colgate	Receiving		
Villanova	Passing		
Villanova	Rushing		
Villanova	Receiving		

=== at No. 20 Harvard ===
No. 22 Colgate Raiders (4–1) at No. 20 Harvard Crimson (2–0) – Game summary

Quarter	1	2	3	4	Total
No. 22 Raiders	0	7	0	10	17
No. 20 Crimson	7	0	0	13	20

at Harvard Stadium • Boston, Massachessets

- Date: October 3
- Game time: 7:00 p.m.
- Game weather: Sunny • Wind: E at 7 miles per hour (11 km/h)
- Game attendance: 9,100
- Referee: Jeff Pumphrey
- TV: ESPN+

Game information

First quarter

- HARV – Teigan Pelletier 6-yard pass from Charlie Smith (Francisco Moscoso kick), 5:48. Crimson 7–0. Drive: 5 plays, 55 yards, 1:53.

Second quarter

- COLG – Caleb Naumann 1-yard run (Luke Vogeler kick), 12:36. Tied 7–7. Drive: 8 plays, 41 yards, 3:47.

Third quarter

No scoring plays

Fourth quarter

- COLG – Luke Vogeler 24-yard field goal, 7:10. Raiders 10–7. Drive: 12 plays, 61 yards, 6:00.
- HARV – Seamus Gilmartin 2-yard pass from Charlie Smith (Francisco Moscoso kick), 2:08. Crimson 14–10. Drive: 10 plays, 78 yards, 4:57.
- COLG – Matt Fogler 13-yard pass from Jake Stearney (Luke Vogeler kick), 0:27. Raiders 17–14. Drive: 13 plays, 75 yards, 1:36.
- HARV – Nathan Bailey 8-yard pass from Charlie Smith, 0:00. Crimson 20–17. Drive: 6 plays, 75 yards, 0:27.

Statistics	COLG	HARV
First downs	21	27
Plays–yards	68–326	75–468
Rushes–yards	30–138	30–93
Passing yards	188	375
Passing: comp–att–int	21–38–1	31–45–1
Turnovers	1	1
Time of possession	29:15	30:45

Team	Category	Player	Statistics
Colgate	Passing	Jake Stearney	21/38, 188 yards, TD, INT
Colgate	Rushing	Caleb Naumann	18 carries, 87 yards, TD
Colgate	Receiving	Matt Fogler	12 receptions, 138 yards, TD
Harvard	Passing	Charlie Smith	31/45, 375 yards, 3 TD, INT
Harvard	Rushing	Xaviah Bascon	10 carries, 51 yards
Harvard	Receiving	Nathan Bailey	16 receptions, 187 yards, TD

=== Georgetown ===
Georgetown Hoyas (1–4) at No. 22 Colgate Raiders (4–2) – Game summary

Quarter	1	2	3	4	Total
Hoyas	0	0	0	0	0
No. 22 Raiders	0	0	0	0	0

at Andy Kerr Stadium • Hamilton, New York

- Date: October 17
- Game time: 1:00 p.m.
- TV: ESPN+

Game information

First quarter
Second quarter
Third quarter
Fourth quarter

Statistics	GTWN	COLG
First downs		
Plays–yards		
Rushes–yards		
Passing yards		
Passing: comp–att–int		
Turnovers		
Time of possession		

Team	Category	Player	Statistics
Georgetown	Passing		
Georgetown	Rushing		
Georgetown	Receiving		
Colgate	Passing		
Colgate	Rushing		
Colgate	Receiving		

=== at No. 25 Richmond ===
Colgate Raiders (4–3) at No. 25 Richmond Spiders (5–2) – Game summary

Quarter	1	2	3	4	Total
Raiders	3	3	0	0	6
No. 25 Spiders	3	10	0	0	13

at E. Claiborne Robins Stadium • Richmond, VA

- Date: October 24
- Game time: 2:00 p.m. EDT
- Game weather: Sunny • Temperature: 63 °F (17 °C)
- Game attendance: 5,519
- Referee: Eric Lewis
- TV announcers (ESPN+): Bob Black (play-by-play), Chris Anderson (analyst) and Guerin Austin (sideline)

Game information

First quarter

- (2:36) COLG - Luke Vogeler 35-yard field goal (Drive: 9 Plays, 70 yards, 3:04; COLG 3–0)
- (0:30) RICH - Kyle Bitsko 39-yard field goal (Drive: 8 Plays, 53 yards, 2:02; TIED 3–3)

Second quarter

- (11:34) COLG - Luke Vogeler 29-yard field goal (Drive: 9 Plays, 76 yards, 3:52; COLG 6–3)
- (5:13) RICH - Ashten Snelsire 16-yard pass to Jaiden Fair, Kyle Bitsko kick (Drive: 4 Plays, 85 yards, 1:57; RICH 10–6)
- (0:00) RICH - Kyle Bitsko 40-yard field goal (Drive: 1 Play, 0 yards, 0:05; RICH 13–6)

Third quarter

- No scoring plays

Fourth quarter

- No scoring plays

Statistics	COLG	RICH
First downs	19	11
Plays–yards	74–316	47–252
Rushes–yards	29–4	26–103
Passing yards	312	149
Passing: Comp–Att–Int	25–45–3	11–21–1
Turnovers	4	1
Time of possession	34:55	25:05

Team	Category	Player	Statistics
Colgate	Passing	Jake Stearney	25/45, 312 yards, 3 INT
Colgate	Rushing	Jake Stearney	15 carries, –18 yards
Colgate	Receiving	Matt Fogler	10 receptions, 180 yards
Richmond	Passing	Ashten Snelsire	10/20, 116 yards, TD, INT
Richmond	Rushing	Aziz Foster-Powell	14 carriers, 80 yards
Richmond	Receiving	Jaiden Fair	2 receptions, 49 yards, TD

=== William & Mary ===
William & Mary Tribe (3–5) at Colgate Raiders (4–4) – Game summary

Quarter	1	2	3	4	Total
Tribe	0	0	0	0	0
Raiders	0	0	0	0	0

at Andy Kerr Stadium • Hamilton, New York

- Date: October 31
- Game time: 1:00 p.m.

Game information

First quarter
Second quarter
Third quarter
Fourth quarter

Statistics	W&M	COLG
First downs		
Plays–yards		
Rushes–yards		
Passing yards		
Passing: comp–att–int		
Turnovers		
Time of possession		

Team	Category	Player	Statistics
William & Mary	Passing		
William & Mary	Rushing		
William & Mary	Receiving		
Colgate	Passing		
Colgate	Rushing		
Colgate	Receiving		

=== at No. 17 Lehigh ===
Colgate Raiders (5–4) at No. 17 Lehigh Mountain Hawks (7–2) – Game summary

Quarter	1	2	Total
Raiders			0
No. 17 Mountain Hawks			0

at Goodman Stadium • Lower Saucon Township, Pennsylvania

- Date: November 7
- Game time: 12:00 p.m.

Game information

First quarter
Second quarter
Third quarter
Fourth quarter

Statistics	COLG	LEH
First downs		
Plays–yards		
Rushes–yards		
Passing yards		
Passing: comp–att–int		
Turnovers		
Time of possession		

Team	Category	Player	Statistics
Colgate	Passing		
Colgate	Rushing		
Colgate	Receiving		
Lehigh	Passing		
Lehigh	Rushing		
Lehigh	Receiving		

=== Lafayette ===
Lafayette Leopards (4–5) at Colgate Raiders (5–5) – Game summary

Quarter	1	2	3	4	Total
Leopards	0	0	0	0	0
Raiders	0	0	0	0	0

at Andy Kerr Stadium • Hamilton, New York

- Date: November 14
- Game time: 1:00 p.m.
- TV: ESPN+

Game information

First quarter
Second quarter
Third quarter
Fourth quarter

Statistics	LAF	COLG
First downs		
Plays–yards		
Rushes–yards		
Passing yards		
Passing: comp–att–int		
Turnovers		
Time of possession		

Team	Category	Player	Statistics
Lafayette	Passing		
Lafayette	Rushing		
Lafayette	Receiving		
Colgate	Passing		
Colgate	Rushing		
Colgate	Receiving		

=== at Bucknell ===
Colgate Raiders (6–5) at Bucknell Bison (1–10) – Game summary

Quarter	1	2	Total
Raiders			0
Bison			0

at Christy Mathewson–Memorial Stadium • Lewisburg, Pennsylvania

- Date: November 21
- Game time: 1:00 p.m.
- TV: ESPN+

Game information

First quarter
Second quarter
Third quarter
Fourth quarter

Statistics	COLG	BUCK
First downs		
Plays–yards		
Rushes–yards		
Passing yards		
Passing: comp–att–int		
Turnovers		
Time of possession		

Team	Category	Player	Statistics
Colgate	Passing		
Colgate	Rushing		
Colgate	Receiving		
Bucknell	Passing		
Bucknell	Rushing		
Bucknell	Receiving		

== Rankings ==
Ranking movements Legend: ██ Increase in ranking ██ Decrease in ranking — = Not ranked RV = Received votes т = Tied with team above or below
	Week														
Poll	Pre	1	2	3	4	5	6	7	8	9	10	11	12	13	Final
STATS	—	—	—	RV	RV	22	23	22	RV	—					
Coaches	—	—	RV	RV	23т	20	23	19	RV	RV					
