= 2026 Georgetown Hoyas football team =

American college football season

2026 Georgetown Hoyas football
- Conference: Patriot League
- Record: 3–7 (3–5 Patriot)
- Head coach: Rob Sgarlata (12th season)
- Offensive coordinator: Jack McDaniels (1st season)
- Defensive coordinator: Kevin Doherty (9th season)
- Base defense: 3–4
- Home stadium: Cooper Field

2026 Patriot League football standings
	Conf.			Overall
Team	W		L	W		L
No. 16 Lehigh $^	8	–	1	10	–	2
Holy Cross	7	–	2	7	–	5
Colgate	6	–	3	7	–	5
Villanova	6	–	3	7	–	5
Richmond	5	–	4	7	–	5
Fordham	4	–	5	4	–	8
Lafayette	3	–	5	4	–	7
Georgetown	3	–	5	3	–	7
William & Mary	2	–	7	4	–	8
Bucknell	0	–	9	1	–	11
$ – Conference champion; ^ – FCS playoff participant; As of November 22, 2026; Rankings from STATS Poll

The 2026 Georgetown Hoyas football team represent Georgetown University as a member of the Patriot League in the 2026 NCAA Division I FCS football season. Being led by twelfth-year head coach Rob Sgarlata, the Hoyas play their home games at Cooper Field in Washington, D.C..

== Schedule ==
Date	Time	Opponent	Site	TV	Result	Attendance
August 27	7:00 p.m.	Lafayette	Cooper Field; Washington, DC	ESPN+	No contest (Note: The game was ruled a no contest after prolonged lightning strikes in the Washington, D.C. area. After approximately a two-hour delay, the game was called after halftime with Lafayette trailing 13–7 and slated to receive the second-half kickoff. The game will not be rescheduled.)	–
September 5	12:30 p.m.	No. 10 Lehigh	Cooper Field; Washington, DC	ESPN+	L 14–45	2,386
September 19	3:30 p.m.	at Richmond	E. Claiborne Robins Stadium; Richmond, VA	ESPN+	L 21–24	5,388
September 26	12:30 p.m.	Columbia*	Cooper Field; Washington, DC	ESPN+	L 17–20 ^{OT}	1,684
October 3	12:30 p.m.	Cornell*^{†}	Cooper Field; Washington, DC	ESPN+	L 14–35	2,500
October 10	12:30 p.m.	Bucknell	Cooper Field; Washington, DC	ESPN+	W 21–14	1,268
October 17	1:00 p.m.	at No. 22 Colgate	Andy Kerr Stadium; Hamilton, NY	ESPN+	W 27–17	2,369
October 24	3:30 p.m.	at William & Mary	Zable Stadium; Williamsburg, VA	ESPN+	W 28–27	12,369
November 7	12:30 p.m.	Holy Cross	Cooper Field; Washington, DC	ESPN+	L 24–27	3,150
November 14	12:00 p.m.	at Fordham	Coffey Field; The Bronx, NY	ESPN+	L 15–37	1,323
November 21	1:00 p.m.	at Villanova	Villanova Stadium; Villanova, PA	ESPN+	L 13–34	4,097
*Non-conference game; ^{†}Homecoming; Rankings from STATS Poll released prior to the game; All times are in Eastern time

== Game summaries ==
=== Lafayette ===
Lafayette Leopards (0–0) at Georgetown Hoyas (0–0) – Game summary – NO CONTEST

Quarter	1	2	3	4	Total
Leopards	-	-	-	-	0
Hoyas	-	-	-	-	0

at Cooper Field • Washington, DC

- Date: August 27
- Game time: 7:00 p.m.
- TV: ESPN+

Statistics	LAF	GTWN
First downs	–	–
Plays–yards	–	–
Rushes–yards	–	–
Passing yards	–	–
Passing: comp–att–int	–	–
Turnovers	–	–
Time of possession	–	–

Team	Category	Player	Statistics
Lafayette	Passing	–	–
Lafayette	Rushing	–	–
Lafayette	Receiving		
Georgetown	Passing	–	–
Georgetown	Rushing	–	–
Georgetown	Receiving	–	–

=== No. 10 Lehigh ===
No. 10 Lehigh Mountain Hawks (1–0) at Georgetown Hoyas (0–0) – Game summary

Quarter	1	2	3	4	Total
No. 10 Mountain Hawks	7	17	7	14	45
Hoyas	0	7	0	7	14

at Cooper Field • Washington, DC

- Date: September 5
- Game time: 12:30 p.m.
- Game weather: Cloudy
- Game attendance: 2,386
- Referee: Bill McKeever
- TV: ESPN+

Game information

First quarter

- LEH – Luke Yoder 4-yard run (Connor Poole kick), 8:21. Mountain Hawks 7–0. Drive: 11 plays, 68 yards, 5:52.

Second quarter

- GTWN – Michael Bonsu 22-yard fumble return (Thomas Anderson kick), 13:54. Tied 7–7.
- LEH – Luke Yoder 20-yard run (Connor Poole kick), 9:18. Mountain Hawks 14–7. Drive: 7 plays, 78 yards, 4:27.
- LEH – Luke Yoder 7-yard pass from Hayden Johnson (Connor Poole kick), 2:46. Mountain Hawks 21–7. Drive: 8 plays, 78 yards, 4:10.
- LEH – Connor Poole 27-yard field goal, 0:34. Mountain Hawks 24–7. Drive: 5 plays, 47 yards, 0:41.

Third quarter

- LEH – Luke Yoder 9-yard run (Connor Poole kick), 8:16. Mountain Hawks 31–7. Drive: 2 plays, 20 yards, 0:47.

Fourth quarter

- LEH – Joseph Marranca 2-yard pass from Hayden Johnson (Connor Poole kick), 13:08. Mountain Hawks 38–7. Drive: 7 plays, 71 yards, 4:01.
- LEH – Aidan Mayfield 12-yard run (Connor Poole kick), 3:56. Mountain Hawks 45–7. Drive: 11 plays, 70 yards, 7:25.
- GTWN – Jonathan Alexander 4-yard pass from Jack Johnson (Thomas Anderson kick), 0:24. Mountain Hawks 45–14. Drive: 13 plays, 75 yards, 3:32.

Statistics	LEH	GTWN
First downs	29	12
Plays–yards	73–573	56–239
Rushes–yards	54–302	31–115
Passing yards	271	124
Passing: comp–att–int	16–19–0	12–25–1
Turnovers	3	1
Time of possession	40:19	19:41

Team	Category	Player	Statistics
Lehigh	Passing	Hayden Johnson	16/19, 271 yards, 2 TD
Lehigh	Rushing	Luke Yoder	17 carries, 120 yards, 3 TD
Lehigh	Receiving	Anthony Feaster	4 receptions, 113 yards
Georgetown	Passing	Jacob Holtschlag	7/15, 71 yards, INT
Georgetown	Rushing	Jack Johnson	7 carries, 46 yards
Georgetown	Receiving	Jayvin Pyle-Thompson	2 receptions, 56 yards

=== at Richmond ===
Georgetown Hoyas (0–1) at Richmond Spiders (2–1) – Game summary

Quarter	1	2	3	4	Total
Hoyas	0	7	7	7	21
Spiders	7	14	0	3	24

at E. Claiborne Robins Stadium • Richmond, Virginia

- Date: September 19
- Game time: 3:30 p.m.
- Game weather: Sunny • Temperature: 83 °F (28 °C) • Wind: East at 5 miles per hour (8.0 km/h)
- Game attendance: 5,388
- Referee: Anthony Florio
- TV announcers (ESPN+/Monumental): Bob Black (play-by-play), Chris Anderson (analyst) and Lane Casadonte (sideline)

Game information

First quarter

- (2:55) RICH - Aziz Foster-Powell 33-yard run, Kyle Bitsko kick (Drive: 4 Plays, 55 yards, 2:07; RICH 7–0)

Second quarter

- (12:26) RICH - Aziz Foster-Powell 4-yard run, Kyle Bitsko kick (Drive: 8Plays, 64 yards, 3:32; RICH 14–0)
- (11:40) GTWN - Jack Johnson 71-yard pass to Hassan Mahasin, Thomas Anderson kick (Drive: 2 Plays, 77 yards, 0:41; RICH 14–7)
- (2:42) RICH - Ashten Snelsire 12-yard pass to Aziz Foster-Powell, Kyle Bitsko kick (Drive: 10 Plays, 62 yards, 5:24; RICH 21–7)

Third quarter

- (9:08) GTWN - Jack Johnson 2-yard pass to Isaiah Grimes, Thomas Anderson kick (Drive: 6 Plays, 90 yards, 2:49; RICH 21–14)

Fourth quarter

- (5:20) GTWN - Jack Johnson 2-yard pass to Burke Carroll, Thomas Anderson kick (Drive: 15 Plays, 96 yards, 7:30; TIED 21–21)
- (0:00) RICH - Kyle Bitsko 49-yard field goal (Drive: 10 Plays, 40 yards, 2:16; RICH 24–21)

Statistics	GTWN	RICH
First downs	11	27
Plays–yards	53–303	77–467
Rushes–yards	30–110	28–145
Passing yards	193	322
Passing: Comp–Att–Int	14–23–0	29–49–0
Turnovers	0	0
Time of possession	25:12	34:48

Team	Category	Player	Statistics
Georgetown	Passing	Jack Johnson	14/23, 193 yards, 3 TD
Georgetown	Rushing	Jayden Sumpter	11 carries, 92 yards
Georgetown	Receiving	Hassan Mahasin	4 receptions, 121 yards, TD
Richmond	Passing	Ashten Snelsire	29/49, 322 yards, TD
Richmond	Rushing	Aziz Foster-Powell	17 carries, 87 yards, 2 TD
Richmond	Receiving	Bryce Allen	6 receptions, 78 yards

=== Columbia ===
Columbia Lions (1–0) at Georgetown Hoyas (0–2) – Game summary

Quarter	1	2	3	4	OT	Total
Lions	7	3	0	7	3	20
Hoyas	0	7	10	0	0	17

at Cooper Field • Washington, DC

- Date: September 26
- Game time: 12:30 p.m.
- Game weather: Cloudy • Temperature: 67 °F (19 °C)
- Game attendance: 1,684
- Referee: Terry Jones
- TV announcers (ESPN+): Jeremy Huber (play-by-play)

Game information

First quarter

- COLU – Braden Dougherty 16-yard pass from Chase Goodwin (Hugo Merry kick), 0:55. Lions 7–0. Drive: 14 plays, 83 yards, 7:34.

Second quarter

- GTWN – Burke Carroll 26-yard pass from Jack Johnson (Thomas Anderson kick), 8:10. Tied 7–7. Drive: 5 plays, 82 yards, 2:03.
- COLU – Hugo Merry 38-yard field goal, 0:24. Lions 10–7. Drive: 8 plays, 60 yards, 2:37.

Third quarter

- GTWN – Hassan Mahasin 71-yard punt return (Thomas Anderson kick), 10:05. Hoyas 14–10.
- GTWN – Thomas Anderson 23-yard field goal, 2:04. Hoyas 17–10. Drive: 8 plays, 70 yards, 3:48.

Fourth quarter

- COLU – Bryce Coleman 2-yard pass from Chase Goodwin (Hugo Merry kick), 13:11. Tied 17–17. Drive: 11 plays, 80 yards, 3:48.

Overtime

- COLU – Hugo Merry 25-yard field goal. Lions 20–17. Drive: 6 plays, 18 yards.

Statistics	COLU	GTWN
First downs	27	10
Plays–yards	91–431	49–234
Rushes–yards	41–154	31–115
Passing yards	277	119
Passing: comp–att–int	23–50–2	10–18–0
Turnovers	2	0
Time of possession	37:34	22:26

Team	Category	Player	Statistics
Columbia	Passing	Chase Goodwin	23/50, 277 yards, 2 TD, 2 INT
Columbia	Rushing	Griffin Johnson	30 carries, 121 yards
Columbia	Receiving	Hutch Crow	6 receptions, 83 yards
Georgetown	Passing	Jack Johnson	10/18, 119 yards, TD
Georgetown	Rushing	Clay Ash	15 carries, 79 yards
Georgetown	Receiving	Isaiah Grimes	3 receptions, 34 yards

=== Cornell ===
Cornell Big Red (1–1) at Georgetown Hoyas (0–3) – Game summary

Quarter	1	2	3	4	Total
Big Red	0	0	0	0	0
Hoyas	0	0	0	0	0

at Cooper Field • Washington, DC

- Date: October 3
- Game time: 12:30 p.m.
- TV: ESPN+

Game information

First quarter
Second quarter
Third quarter
Fourth quarter

Statistics	COR	GTWN
First downs		
Plays–yards		
Rushes–yards		
Passing yards		
Passing: comp–att–int		
Turnovers		
Time of possession		

Team	Category	Player	Statistics
Cornell	Passing		
Cornell	Rushing		
Cornell	Receiving		
Georgetown	Passing		
Georgetown	Rushing		
Georgetown	Receiving		

=== Bucknell ===
Bucknell Bison (1–4) at Georgetown Hoyas (0–4) – Game summary

Quarter	1	2	3	4	Total
Bison	0	0	0	0	0
Hoyas	0	0	0	0	0

at Cooper Field • Washington, DC

- Date: October 10
- Game time: 12:30 p.m.
- TV: ESPN+

Game information

First quarter
Second quarter
Third quarter
Fourth quarter

Statistics	BUCK	GTWN
First downs		
Plays–yards		
Rushes–yards		
Passing yards		
Passing: comp–att–int		
Turnovers		
Time of possession		

Team	Category	Player	Statistics
Bucknell	Passing		
Bucknell	Rushing		
Bucknell	Receiving		
Georgetown	Passing		
Georgetown	Rushing		
Georgetown	Receiving		

=== at No. 22 Colgate ===
Georgetown Hoyas (1–4) at No. 22 Colgate Raiders (4–2) – Game summary

Quarter	1	2	3	4	Total
Hoyas	0	0	0	0	0
No. 22 Raiders	0	0	0	0	0

at Andy Kerr Stadium • Hamilton, New York

- Date: October 17
- Game time: 1:00 p.m.
- TV: ESPN+

Game information

First quarter
Second quarter
Third quarter
Fourth quarter

Statistics	GTWN	COLG
First downs		
Plays–yards		
Rushes–yards		
Passing yards		
Passing: comp–att–int		
Turnovers		
Time of possession		

Team	Category	Player	Statistics
Georgetown	Passing		
Georgetown	Rushing		
Georgetown	Receiving		
Colgate	Passing		
Colgate	Rushing		
Colgate	Receiving		

=== at William & Mary ===
Georgetown Hoyas (2–4) at William & Mary Tribe (3–4) – Game summary

Quarter	1	2	3	4	Total
Hoyas	0	0	0	0	0
Tribe	0	0	0	0	0

at Zable Stadium • Williamsburg, Virginia

- Date: October 24
- Game time: 3:30 p.m.
- TV: ESPN+

Game information

First quarter
Second quarter
Third quarter
Fourth quarter

Statistics	GTWN	W&M
First downs		
Plays–yards		
Rushes–yards		
Passing yards		
Passing: comp–att–int		
Turnovers		
Time of possession		

Team	Category	Player	Statistics
Georgetown	Passing		
Georgetown	Rushing		
Georgetown	Receiving		
William & Mary	Passing		
William & Mary	Rushing		
William & Mary	Receiving		

=== Holy Cross ===
Holy Cross Crusaders (4–5) at Georgetown Hoyas (3–4) – Game summary

Quarter	1	2	3	4	Total
Crusaders	0	0	0	0	0
Hoyas	0	0	0	0	0

at Cooper Field • Washington, DC

- Date: November 7
- Game time: 12:30 p.m.
- TV: ESPN+

Game information

First quarter
Second quarter
Third quarter
Fourth quarter

Statistics	HC	GTWN
First downs		
Plays–yards		
Rushes–yards		
Passing yards		
Passing: comp–att–int		
Turnovers		
Time of possession		

Team	Category	Player	Statistics
Holy Cross	Passing		
Holy Cross	Rushing		
Holy Cross	Receiving		
Georgetown	Passing		
Georgetown	Rushing		
Georgetown	Receiving		

=== at Fordham ===
Georgetown Hoyas (3–5) at Fordham Rams (3–7) – Game summary

Quarter	1	2	3	4	Total
Hoyas	0	0	0	0	0
Rams	0	0	0	0	0

at Coffey Field • The Bronx, New York

- Date: November 14
- Game time: 12:00 p.m.
- TV: ESPN+

Game information

First quarter
Second quarter
Third quarter
Fourth quarter

Statistics	GTWN	FOR
First downs		
Plays–yards		
Rushes–yards		
Passing yards		
Passing: comp–att–int		
Turnovers		
Time of possession		

Team	Category	Player	Statistics
Georgetown	Passing		
Georgetown	Rushing		
Georgetown	Receiving		
Fordham	Passing		
Fordham	Rushing		
Fordham	Receiving		

=== at Villanova ===
Georgetown Hoyas (3–6) at Villanova Wildcats (6–5) – Game summary

Quarter	1	2	3	4	Total
Hoyas	0	0	0	0	0
Wildcats	0	0	0	0	0

at Villanova Stadium • Villanova, Pennsylvania

- Date: November 21
- Game time: 1:00 p.m.
- TV: ESPN+

Game information

First quarter
Second quarter
Third quarter
Fourth quarter

Statistics	GTWN	VILL
First downs		
Plays–yards		
Rushes–yards		
Passing yards		
Passing: comp–att–int		
Turnovers		
Time of possession		

Team	Category	Player	Statistics
Georgetown	Passing		
Georgetown	Rushing		
Georgetown	Receiving		
Villanova	Passing		
Villanova	Rushing		
Villanova	Receiving		
