= 2026 Richmond Spiders football team =

American college football season

2026 Richmond Spiders football
- Conference: Patriot League
- Record: 7–5 (5–4 Patriot)
- Head coach: Russ Huesman (10th season)
- Co-offensive coordinators: Jacob Huesman (2nd season); Mike Cummings (2nd season)
- Defensive coordinator: Justin Wood (7th season)
- Home stadium: E. Claiborne Robins Stadium

2026 Patriot League football standings
	Conf.			Overall
Team	W		L	W		L
No. 16 Lehigh $^	8	–	1	10	–	2
Holy Cross	7	–	2	7	–	5
Colgate	6	–	3	7	–	5
Villanova	6	–	3	7	–	5
Richmond	5	–	4	7	–	5
Fordham	4	–	5	4	–	8
Lafayette	3	–	5	4	–	7
Georgetown	3	–	5	3	–	7
William & Mary	2	–	7	4	–	8
Bucknell	0	–	9	1	–	11
$ – Conference champion; ^ – FCS playoff participant; As of November 22, 2026; Rankings from STATS Poll

The 2026 Richmond Spiders football team will represent the University of Richmond as a member of the Patriot League during the 2026 NCAA Division I FCS football season. The Spiders will be coached by tenth-year head coach Russ Huesman and play at the E. Claiborne Robins Stadium in Richmond, Virginia.

== Schedule ==
Date	Time	Opponent	Rank	Site	TV	Result	Attendance
August 29	6:00 p.m.	Bucknell		E. Claiborne Robins Stadium; Richmond, VA	ESPN+	W 35–14	5,717
September 5	6:00 p.m.	at Howard*		William H. Greene Stadium; Washington, DC	MEAC Network	W 28–21	3,671
September 11	7:00 p.m.	at NC State*		Carter–Finley Stadium; Raleigh, NC	ESPNU	L 0–73	56,919
September 19	3:30 p.m.	Georgetown		E. Claiborne Robins Stadium; Richmond, VA	ESPN+/Monumental	W 24–21	5,388
September 26	2:00 p.m.	Furman*		E. Claiborne Robins Stadium; Richmond, VA	ESPN+	W 13–9	6,558
October 3	12:30 p.m.	at Lafayette	No. 24	Fisher Stadium; Easton, PA	ESPN+	W 40–31	4,123
October 10	3:30 p.m.	at Fordham	No. 19	Coffey Field; The Bronx, NY	ESPN+	L 14–20	1,825
October 24	2:00 p.m.	Colgate^{†}	No. 25	E. Claiborne Robins Stadium; Richmond, VA	ESPN+	W 13–6	5,519
October 31	1:00 p.m.	at Holy Cross	No. 21	Fitton Field; Worcester, MA	ESPN+	L 14–33	7,769
November 7	1:00 p.m.	at Villanova		Villanova Stadium; Villanova, PA	ESPN+	L 0–30	3,747
November 14	2:00 p.m.	No. 17 Lehigh		E. Claiborne Robins Stadium; Richmond, VA	ESPN+/MASN	L 14–21	4,845
November 21	noon	William & Mary		E. Claiborne Robins Stadium; Richmond, VA (Capital Cup)	ESPN+/MASN	W 17–16	6,195
*Non-conference game; ^{†}Homecoming; Rankings from STATS Poll released prior to the game; All times are in Eastern time

== Game summaries ==
=== Bucknell ===
Bucknell Bison (0–0) at Richmond Spiders (0–0) – Game summary

Quarter	1	2	3	4	Total
Bison	0	0	7	7	14
Spiders	21	7	0	7	35

at E. Claiborne Robins Stadium • Richmond, VA

- Date: August 29
- Game time: 6:00 p.m. EDT
- Game weather: Sunny • Temperature: 80 °F (27 °C) • Wind: E at 5 miles per hour (8.0 km/h)
- Game attendance: 5,717
- Referee: Jeremy DeAngulo
- TV announcers (ESPN+): Bob Black (play-by-play), Chris Anderson (analyst) and Guerin Austin (sideline)

Game information

First quarter

- (10:21) RICH - Ashten Snelsire 8-yard pass to Carson Derey, Kyle Bitsko kick (Drive: 6 Plays, 59 yards, 3:06; RICH 7–0)
- (6:06) RICH - Ashten Snelsire 9-yard pass to Bryce Allen, Kyle Bitsko kick (Drive: 7 Plays, 38 yards, 3:19; RICH 14–0)
- (1:08) RICH - Aziz Foster-Powell 1-yard run, Kyle Bitsko kick (Drive: 5 Plays, 40 yards, 2:17; RICH 21–0)

Second quarter

- (1:56) RICH - Aziz Foster-Powell 5-yard run, Kyle Bitsko kick (Drive: 3 Plays, 30 yards, 1:39; RICH 28–0)

Third quarter

- (2:34) BUCK - Chris Dietrich 51-yard pass to Michael Cadden, Juan Garanton kick (Drive: 2 Plays, 74 yards, 1:00; RICH 28–7)

Fourth quarter

- (13:03) BUCK - Chris Dietrich 29-yard pass to Sam Milligan, Juan Garanton kick (Drive: 9 Plays, 69 yards, 3:42; RICH 28–14)
- (12:53) RICH - Ashten Snelsire 75-yard pass to Bryce Allen, Kyle Bitsko kick (Drive: 1 Play, 75 yards, 0:10; RICH 35–14)

Statistics	BUCK	RICH
First downs	12	17
Plays–yards	59–187	62–393
Rushes–yards	29–32	34–194
Passing yards	155	199
Passing: Comp–Att–Int	16–30–0	17–28–0
Turnovers	1	1
Time of possession	28:54	31:06

Team	Category	Player	Statistics
Bucknell	Passing	Chris Dietrich	16/30, 155 yards, 2 TD
Bucknell	Rushing	Michael Cadden	12 carries, 24 yards
Bucknell	Receiving	Sam Milligan	6 receptions, 70 yards, TD
Richmond	Passing	Ashten Snelsire	17/28, 199 yards, 3 TD
Richmond	Rushing	Aziz Foster-Powell	15 carries, 108 yards, 2 TD
Richmond	Receiving	Bryce Allen	4 receptions, 106 yards, 2 TD

=== at Howard ===
Richmond Spiders (1–0) at Howard Bison (1–0) – Game summary

Quarter	1	2	3	4	Total
Spiders	13	7	8	0	28
Bison	0	0	14	7	21

at William H. Greene Stadium • Washington, DC

- Date: September 5
- Game time: 6:00 p.m. EDT
- Game weather: Cloudy • Temperature: 80 °F (27 °C) • Wind: N at 6 miles per hour (9.7 km/h)
- Game attendance: 3,671
- Referee: Ryan Massey
- TV announcers (MEAC Network): Trevin A. Jones (play-by-play) and Nate Henry (analyst)

Game information

First quarter

- (13:06) RICH - Ashten Snelsire 15-yard pass to Bryce Allen, Kyle Bitsko kick blocked (Drive: 2 Plays, 20 yards, 0:43; RICH 6–0)
- (1:50) RICH - Aziz Foster-Powell 1-yard run, Kyle Bitsko kick (Drive: 7 Plays, 63 yards, 3:45; RICH 13–0)

Second quarter

- (12:25) RICH - Ashten Snelsire 42-yard pass to Quanye Veney, Kyle Bitsko kick (Drive: 7 Plays, 66 yards, 2:42; RICH 20–0)

Third quarter

- (11:53) HOW - Gabe Howard 0-yard fumble return, Matt Conord kick (RICH 20–7)
- (7:00) HOW - Ja'Shawn Scroggins 30-yard pass to Antonio Hunter, Matt Conord kick (Drive: 9 Plays, 84 yards, 3:48; RICH 20–14)
- (1:57) RICH - Ashten Snelsire 29-yard pass to Sean Clarke, Ashten Snelsire run for two-point conversion (Drive: 2 Plays, 29 yards, 0:55; RICH 28–14)

Fourth quarter

- (11:35) HOW - Billy Roberson II 1-yard run, Matt Conord kick (Drive: 14 Plays, 75 yards, 5:22; RICH 28–21)

Statistics	RICH	HOW
First downs	17	14
Plays–yards	67–300	63–240
Rushes–yards	32–39	35–131
Passing yards	261	109
Passing: Comp–Att–Int	19–35–0	9–28–1
Turnovers	1	2
Time of possession	32:30	27:30

Team	Category	Player	Statistics
Richmond	Passing	Ashten Snelsire	19/35, 261 yards, 3 TD
Richmond	Rushing	Jamaal Brown	9 carries, 36 yards
Richmond	Receiving	Sean Clarke	7 receptions, 80 yards, TD
Howard	Passing	Ja'Shawn Scroggins	9/28, 109 yards, TD, INT
Howard	Rushing	Billy Roberson II	7 carries, 44 yards, TD
Howard	Receiving	Antonio Hunter	2 receptions, 43 yards, TD

=== at NC State (FBS) ===
Richmond Spiders (2–0) at NC State Wolfpack (FBS) (0–1) – Game summary

Quarter	1	2	3	4	Total
Spiders	0	0	0	0	0
Wolfpack (FBS)	21	28	14	10	73

at Carter–Finley Stadium • Raleigh, NC

- Date: September 11
- Game time: 7:00 p.m. EDT
- Game weather: Sunny • Temperature: 86 °F (30 °C) • Wind: SW at 3 miles per hour (4.8 km/h)
- Game attendance: 56,919
- Referee: Riley Johnson
- TV announcers (ESPNU): Jay Alter and Tom Luginbill

Game information

First quarter

- (11:21) NCSU - Davion Gause 19-yard run, Kanoah Vinesett kick (Drive: 4 Plays, 77 yards, 1:48; NCSU 7–0)
- (10:44) NCSU - Jayden Scott 65-yard run, Kanoah Vinesett kick (Drive: 1 Play, 65 yards, 0:11; NCSU 14–0)
- (1:01) NCSU - Jayden Scott 7-yard run, Kanoah Vinesett kick (Drive: 13 Plays, 86 yards, 7:08; NCSU 21–0)

Second quarter

- (11:33) NCSU - CJ Bailey 1-yard run, Kanoah Vinesett kick (Drive: 5 Plays, 42 yards, 2:42; NCSU 28–0)
- (8:30) NCSU - Will Wilson 1-yard run, Kanoah Vinesett kick (Drive: 5 Plays, 71 yards, 2:05; NCSU 35–0)
- (6:23) NCSU - CJ Bailey 15-yard pass to Preston Douglas, Kanoah Vinesett kick (Drive: 3 Plays, 50 yards, 1:01; NCSU 42–0)
- (0:24) NCSU - Will Wilson 1-yard run, Kanoah Vinesett kick (Drive: 8 Plays, 86 yards, 1:18; NCSU 49–0)

Third quarter

- (9:04) NCSU - Will Wilson 5-yard run, Kanoah Vinesett kick (Drive: 11 Plays, 66 yards, 5:56; NCSU 56–0)
- (4:12) NCSU - Will Wilson 3-yard pass to Hunter Providence, Kanoah Vinesett kick (Drive: 2 Plays, 54 yards, 0:54; NCSU 63–0)

Fourth quarter

- (6:31) NCSU - Kanoah Vinesett 45-yard field goal (Drive: 10 Plays, 55 yards, 10:13; NCSU 66–0)
- (1:49) NCSU - Dylan McCoy 51-yard run, Kanoah Vinesett kick (Drive: 5 Plays, 68 yards, 2:17; NCSU 73–0)

Statistics	RICH	NCSU
First downs	6	31
Plays–yards	49–110	69–734
Rushes–yards	22–34	45–428
Passing yards	76	306
Passing: Comp–Att–Int	8–27–1	18–24–0
Turnovers	2	1
Time of possession	22:17	37:43

Team	Category	Player	Statistics
Richmond	Passing	Ashten Snelsire	8/23, 76 yards, INT
Richmond	Rushing	Warrick Stephenson	14 carries, 58 yards
Richmond	Receiving	Sean Clarke	3 receptions, 14 yards
NC State	Passing	CJ Bailey	13/17, 281 yards, TD
NC State	Rushing	Jayden Scott	9 carries, 128 yards, 2 TD
NC State	Receiving	Keenan Jackson	4 receptions, 123 yards

=== Georgetown ===
Georgetown Hoyas (0–1) at Richmond Spiders (2–1) – Game summary

Quarter	1	2	3	4	Total
Hoyas	0	7	7	7	21
Spiders	7	14	0	3	24

at E. Claiborne Robins Stadium • Richmond, VA

- Date: September 19
- Game time: 3:30 p.m. EDT
- Game weather: Sunny • Temperature: 83 °F (28 °C) • Wind: East at 5 miles per hour (8.0 km/h)
- Game attendance: 5,388
- Referee: Anthony Florio
- TV announcers (ESPN+/Monumental): Bob Black (play-by-play), Chris Anderson (analyst) and Lane Casadonte (sideline)

Game information

First quarter

- (2:55) RICH - Aziz Foster-Powell 33-yard run, Kyle Bitsko kick (Drive: 4 Plays, 55 yards, 2:07; RICH 7–0)

Second quarter

- (12:26) RICH - Aziz Foster-Powell 4-yard run, Kyle Bitsko kick (Drive: 8 Plays, 64 yards, 3:32; RICH 14–0)
- (11:40) GTWN - Jack Johnson 71-yard pass to Hassan Mahasin, Thomas Anderson kick (Drive: 2 Plays, 77 yards, 0:41; RICH 14–7)
- (2:42) RICH - Ashten Snelsire 12-yard pass to Aziz Foster-Powell, Kyle Bitsko kick (Drive: 10 Plays, 62 yards, 5:24; RICH 21–7)

Third quarter

- (9:08) GTWN - Jack Johnson 2-yard pass to Isaiah Grimes, Thomas Anderson kick (Drive: 6 Plays, 90 yards, 2:49; RICH 21–14)

Fourth quarter

- (5:20) GTWN - Jack Johnson 2-yard pass to Burke Carroll, Thomas Anderson kick (Drive: 15 Plays, 96 yards, 7:30; TIED 21–21)
- (0:00) RICH - Kyle Bitsko 49-yard field goal (Drive: 10 Plays, 40 yards, 2:16; RICH 24–21)

Statistics	GTWN	RICH
First downs	11	27
Plays–yards	53–303	77–467
Rushes–yards	30–110	28–145
Passing yards	193	322
Passing: Comp–Att–Int	14–23–0	29–49–0
Turnovers	0	0
Time of possession	25:12	34:48

Team	Category	Player	Statistics
Georgetown	Passing	Jack Johnson	14/23, 193 yards, 3 TD
Georgetown	Rushing	Jayden Sumpter	11 carries, 92 yards
Georgetown	Receiving	Hassan Mahasin	4 receptions, 121 yards, TD
Richmond	Passing	Ashten Snelsire	29/49, 322 yards, TD
Richmond	Rushing	Aziz Foster-Powell	17 carries, 87 yards, 2 TD
Richmond	Receiving	Bryce Allen	6 receptions, 78 yards

=== Furman ===
Furman Paladins (2–2) at Richmond Spiders (3–1) – Game summary

Quarter	1	2	3	4	Total
Paladins	3	6	0	0	9
Spiders	3	7	3	0	13

at E. Claiborne Robins Stadium • Richmond, VA

- Date: September 26
- Game time: 2:00 p.m. EDT
- Game weather: Sunny • Temperature: 70 °F (21 °C) • Wind: N at 13 miles per hour (21 km/h)
- Game attendance: 6,558
- Referee: Jay Johnson
- TV announcers (ESPN+): Robert Fish (play-by-play), Chris Anderson (analyst) and Chip Tarkenton (sideline)

Game information

First quarter

- (5:44) RICH - Kyle Bitsko 26-yard field goal (Drive: 8 Plays, 49 yards, 3:42; RICH 3–0)
- (0:00) FUR - Nathan Chapman 33-yard field goal (Drive: 7 Plays, 33 yards, 2:08; TIED 3–3)

Second quarter

- (9:22) RICH - Ashten Snelsire 6-yard pass to Carson Derey, Kyle Bitsko kick (Drive: 11 Plays, 75 yards, 5:38; RICH 10–3)
- (3:20) FUR - Nathan Chapman 42-yard field goal (Drive: 11 Plays, 50 yards, 4:30; RICH 10–6)
- (0:00) FUR - Nathan Chapman 49-yard field goal (Drive: 7 Plays, 35 yards, 0:36; RICH 10–9)

Third quarter

- (5:34) RICH - Kyle Bitsko 30-yard field goal (Drive: 6 Plays, 14 yards, 3:08; RICH 13–9)

Fourth quarter

- No scoring plays

Statistics	FUR	RICH
First downs	13	25
Plays–yards	61–215	78–355
Rushes–yards	31–78	38–188
Passing yards	137	167
Passing: Comp–Att–Int	15–30–0	19–40–3
Turnovers	2	4
Time of possession	23:03	36:57

Team	Category	Player	Statistics
Furman	Passing	Connor Ackerley	15/30, 137 yards
Furman	Rushing	Connor Ackerley	14 carries, 35 yards
Furman	Receiving	Luke Shields	4 receptions, 50 yards
Richmond	Passing	Ashten Snelsire	19/40, 167 yards, TD, 3 INT
Richmond	Rushing	Aziz Foster-Powell	25 carries, 125 yards
Richmond	Receiving	Andreas Hill	5 receptions, 38 yards

=== at Lafayette ===
No. 24 Richmond Spiders (4–1) at Lafayette Leopards (1–3) – Game summary

Quarter	1	2	3	4	Total
No. 24 Spiders	7	10	14	9	40
Leopards	14	10	0	7	31

at Fisher Stadium • Easton, PA

- Date: October 3
- Game time: 12:30 p.m. EDT
- Game weather: Sunny • Temperature: 71 °F (22 °C) • Wind: E at 8 miles per hour (13 km/h)
- Game attendance: 4,123
- Referee: Alex Parrella
- TV announcers (ESPN+): Gary Laubach (play-by-play), Mike Joseph (analyst) and Michael Marcantonini (sideline)

Game information

First quarter

- (8:21) LAF - Daniel Lipovski 4-yard run, Jack Simonetta kick (Drive: 6 Plays, 75 yards, 1:53; LAF 7–0)
- (1:05) RICH - Ashten Snelsire 24-yard pass to Carson Derey, Kyle Bitsko kick (Drive: 12 Plays, 75 yards, 7:16; TIED 7–7)
- (0:20) LAF - Jakyre Henley 72-yard run, Jack Simonetta kick (Drive: 2 Plays, 75 yards, 0:45; LAF 14–7)

Second quarter

- (6:08) LAF - Jack Simonetta 21-yard field goal (Drive: 5 Plays, 31 yards, 1:59; LAF 17–7)
- (1:45) LAF - Jakyre Henley 74-yard run, Jack Simonetta kick (Drive: 2 Plays, 91 yards, 0:43; LAF 24–7)
- (0:33) RICH - Kyle Bitsko 25-yard field goal (Drive: 9 Plays, 67 yards, 1:12; LAF 24–10)
- (0:04) RICH - Ashten Snelsire 3-yard run, Kyle Bitsko kick (Drive: 3 Plays, 16 yards, 0:15; LAF 24–17)

Third quarter

- (11:04) RICH - Aziz Foster-Powell 4-yard run, Kyle Bitsko kick (Drive: 7 Plays, 75 yards, 3:56; TIED 24–24)
- (2:42) RICH - Ashten Snelsire 9-yard pass to Quanye Veney, Kyle Bitsko kick (Drive: 12 Plays, 56 yards, 7:13; RICH 31–24)

Fourth quarter

- (11:23) RICH - Ashten Snelsire 3-yard pass to Sean Clarke, Kyle Bitsko kick (Drive: 8 Plays, 57 yards, 4:46; RICH 38–24)
- (9:35) LAF - Malachi Gamble 10-yard run, Jack Simonetta kick (Drive: 4 Plays, 69 yards, 1:48; RICH 38–31)
- (1:30) RICH - Camden Byrd 0-yard safety (RICH 40–31)

Statistics	RICH	LAF
First downs	30	14
Plays–yards	86–468	47–367
Rushes–yards	48–250	26–191
Passing yards	218	176
Passing: Comp–Att–Int	24–38–2	10–21–1
Turnovers	3	2
Time of possession	41:41	18:19

Team	Category	Player	Statistics
Richmond	Passing	Ashten Snelsire	24/38, 218 yards, 3 TD, 2 INT
Richmond	Rushing	Aziz Foster-Powell	22 carries, 113 yards, TD
Richmond	Receiving	Carson Derey	5 receptions, 61 yards, TD
Lafayette	Passing	Daniel Lipovski	7/16, 101 yards, INT
Lafayette	Rushing	Jakyre Henley	8 carries, 152 yards, 2 TD
Lafayette	Receiving	Mason Kuehner	5 receptions, 108 yards

=== at Fordham ===
No. 19 Richmond Spiders (5–1) at Fordham Rams (1–5) – Game summary

Quarter	1	2	3	4	Total
No. 19 Spiders	0	7	7	0	14
Rams	7	0	7	6	20

at Coffey Field • The Bronx, NY

- Date: October 10
- Game time: 3:30 p.m. EDT
- Game weather: Cloudy • Temperature: 69 °F (21 °C) • Wind: E at 4 miles per hour (6.4 km/h)
- Game attendance: 1,825
- Referee: Alexander Randolph
- TV announcers (ESPN+): Andrew Bogusch (play-by-play) and Andrew Posadas (analyst)

Game information

First quarter

- (11:07) FOR - Gunnar Smith 10-yard pass to Ricky Gonzalez II, Bennett Henderson kick (Drive: 9 Plays, 76 yards, 3:47; FOR 7–0)

Second quarter

- (14:12) RICH - Ashten Snelsire 6-yard pass to Bryce Allen, Kyle Bitsko kick (Drive: 14 Plays, 86 yards, 8:31; TIED 7–7)

Third quarter

- (11:59) RICH - Jordan Allen 0-yard fumble recovery, Kyle Bitsko kick (RICH 14–7)
- (4:36) FOR - Jamell James 2-yard run, Bennett Henderson kick (Drive: 5 Plays, 50 yards, 2:45; TIED 14–14)

Fourth quarter

- (2:23) FOR - Gunnar Smith 5-yard run, Bennett Henderson kick failed (Drive: 12 Plays, 62 yards, 5:47; FOR 20–14)

Statistics	RICH	FOR
First downs	13	18
Plays–yards	63–204	60–258
Rushes–yards	24–82	35–160
Passing yards	122	98
Passing: Comp–Att–Int	24–39–1	13–25–1
Turnovers	2	3
Time of possession	31:03	28:57

Team	Category	Player	Statistics
Richmond	Passing	Ashten Snelsire	24/39, 122 yards, INT
Richmond	Rushing	Aziz Foster-Powell	12 carries, 68 yards
Richmond	Receiving	Sean Clarke	6 receptions, 34 yards
Fordham	Passing	Gunnar Smith	13/25, 98 yards, TD, INT
Fordham	Rushing	Jamell James	15 carries, 80 yards
Fordham	Receiving	KJ Reed	4 receptions, 42 yards

=== Colgate ===
Colgate Raiders (4–3) at No. 25 Richmond Spiders (5–2) – Game summary

Quarter	1	2	3	4	Total
Raiders	3	3	0	0	6
No. 25 Spiders	3	10	0	0	13

at E. Claiborne Robins Stadium • Richmond, VA

- Date: October 24
- Game time: 2:00 p.m. EDT
- Game weather: Sunny • Temperature: 63 °F (17 °C)
- Game attendance: 5,519
- Referee: Eric Lewis
- TV announcers (ESPN+): Bob Black (play-by-play), Chris Anderson (analyst) and Guerin Austin (sideline)

Game information

First quarter

- (2:36) COLG - Luke Vogeler 35-yard field goal (Drive: 9 Plays, 70 yards, 3:04; COLG 3–0)
- (0:30) RICH - Kyle Bitsko 39-yard field goal (Drive: 8 Plays, 53 yards, 2:02; TIED 3–3)

Second quarter

- (11:34) COLG - Luke Vogeler 29-yard field goal (Drive: 9 Plays, 76 yards, 3:52; COLG 6–3)
- (5:13) RICH - Ashten Snelsire 16-yard pass to Jaiden Fair, Kyle Bitsko kick (Drive: 4 Plays, 85 yards, 1:57; RICH 10–6)
- (0:00) RICH - Kyle Bitsko 40-yard field goal (Drive: 1 Play, 0 yards, 0:05; RICH 13–6)

Third quarter

- No scoring plays

Fourth quarter

- No scoring plays

Statistics	COLG	RICH
First downs	19	11
Plays–yards	74–316	47–252
Rushes–yards	29–4	26–103
Passing yards	312	149
Passing: Comp–Att–Int	25–45–3	11–21–1
Turnovers	4	1
Time of possession	34:55	25:05

Team	Category	Player	Statistics
Colgate	Passing	Jake Stearney	25/45, 312 yards, 3 INT
Colgate	Rushing	Jake Stearney	15 carries, –18 yards
Colgate	Receiving	Matt Fogler	10 receptions, 180 yards
Richmond	Passing	Ashten Snelsire	10/20, 116 yards, TD, INT
Richmond	Rushing	Aziz Foster-Powell	14 carriers, 80 yards
Richmond	Receiving	Jaiden Fair	2 receptions, 49 yards, TD

=== at Holy Cross ===
No. 21 Richmond Spiders (6–2) at Holy Cross Crusaders (3–5) – Game summary

Quarter	1	2	3	4	Total
No. 21 Spiders	14	0	0	0	14
Crusaders	7	6	6	14	33

at Fitton Field • Worcester, MA

- Date: October 31
- Game time: 1:00 p.m. EDT
- Game weather: Sunny • Temperature: 52 °F (11 °C) • Wind: NW at 10 miles per hour (16 km/h)
- Game attendance: 7,769
- Referee: Jay Johnson
- TV announcers (ESPN+): Kevin Gehl (play-by-play), Kevin Shea (analyst) and Brittany Mahan (sideline)

Game information

First quarter

- (10:53) RICH - Aziz Foster-Powell 3-yard run, Kyle Bitsko kick (Drive: 7 Plays, 66 yards, 4:00; RICH 7–0)
- (3:51) HC - Joseph Williams 21-yard run, Owen Saraceno kick (Drive: 11 Plays, 61 yards, 6:57; TIED 7–7)
- (0:45) RICH - Ashten Snelsire 11-yard pass to Andreas Hill, Kyle Bitsko kick (Drive: 3 Plays, 16 yards, 1:28; RICH 14–7)

Second quarter

- (7:08) HC - Joseph Williams 3-yard run, Owen Saraceno kick failed (Drive: 8 Plays, 73 yards, 4:33; RICH 14–13)

Third quarter

- (3:13) HC - Jake Croce 2-yard run, two-point conversion failed (Drive: 10 Plays, 96 yards, 5:52; HC 19–14)

Fourth quarter

- (11:04) HC - Joseph Williams 62-yard run, Owen Saraceno kick (Drive: 3 Plays, 80 yards, 1:40; HC 26–14)
- (5:01) HC - Jake Croce 2-yard run, Owen Saraceno kick (Drive: 9 Plays, 66 yards, 5:26; HC 33–14)

Statistics	RICH	HC
First downs	13	23
Plays–yards	49–209	63–415
Rushes–yards	28–128	43–323
Passing yards	81	92
Passing: Comp–Att–Int	9–21–1	11–20–0
Turnovers	1	1
Time of possession	25:35	34:25

Team	Category	Player	Statistics
Richmond	Passing	Ashten Snelsire	9/20, 81 yards, TD, INT
Richmond	Rushing	Aziz Foster-Powell	12 carries, 57 yards, TD
Richmond	Receiving	Andreas Hill	2 receptions, 38 yards, TD
Holy Cross	Passing	David Lynch	11/20, 92 yards
Holy Cross	Rushing	Joseph Williams	19 carries, 206 yards, 3 TD
Holy Cross	Receiving	Lincoln Fisher	2 receptions, 41 yards

=== at Villanova ===
Richmond Spiders (6–3) at Villanova Wildcats (5–4) – Game summary

Quarter	1	2	3	4	Total
Spiders	0	0	0	0	0
Wildcats	7	13	0	10	30

at Villanova Stadium • Villanova, PA

- Date: November 7
- Game time: 1:00 p.m. EST
- Game weather: Sunny • Temperature: 56 °F (13 °C) • Wind: NW at 15 miles per hour (24 km/h)
- Game attendance: 3,747
- Referee: Tom Zetts
- TV announcers (ESPN+): Aaron Hook (play-by-play), Steve Pinnone (analyst) and Tessa Peloso (sideline)

Game information

First quarter

- (3:50) VILL - Pat McQuaide 6-yard pass to Brandon Binkowski, Dominic LeBlanc kick (Drive: 7 Plays, 57 yards, 3:55; VILL 7–0)

Second quarter

- (12:14) VILL - Dominic LeBlanc 32-yard field goal (Drive: 9 Plays, 51 yards, 4:14; VILL 10–0)
- (5:25) VILL - Pat McQuaide 46-yard pass to Braden Reed, Dominic LeBlanc kick (Drive: 8 Plays, 75 yards, 3:59; VILL 20–0)
- (0:44) VILL - Dominic LeBlanc 41-yard field goal (Drive: 10 Plays, 29 yards, 3:30; VILL 10–0)

Third quarter

No scoring plays

Fourth quarter

- (12:42) VILL - Pat McQuaide 19-yard pass to Ja'briel Mace, Dominic LeBlanc kick (Drive: 5 Plays, 60 yards, 2:58; VILL 27–0)
- (3:36) VILL - Dominic LeBlanc 33-yard field goal (Drive: 10 Plays, 39 yards, 6:15; VILL 30–0)

Statistics	RICH	VILL
First downs	7	21
Plays–yards	46–140	67–417
Rushes–yards	25–80	49–238
Passing yards	60	179
Passing: Comp–Att–Int	8–21–0	12–18–0
Turnovers	0	0
Time of possession	21:22	38:38

Team	Category	Player	Statistics
Richmond	Passing	Jack Callaghan	8/21, 60 yards
Richmond	Rushing	Jack Callaghan	15 carries, 54 yards
Richmond	Receiving	Quanye Veney	3 receptions, 27 yards
Villanova	Passing	Pat McQuaide	11/17, 163 yards, 3 TD
Villanova	Rushing	Isaiah Ragaland	17 carries, 125 yards
Villanova	Receiving	Braden Reed	5 receptions, 75 yards, TD

=== No. 17 Lehigh ===
No. 17 Lehigh Mountain Hawks (8–2) at Richmond Spiders (6–4) – Game summary

Quarter	1	2	3	4	Total
No. 17 Mountain Hawks	0	6	7	8	21
Spiders	0	14	0	0	14

at E. Claiborne Robins Stadium • Richmond, VA

- Date: November 14
- Game time: 2:00 p.m. EST
- Game weather: Sunny • Temperature: 52 °F (11 °C)
- Game attendance: 4,845
- Referee: Terry Jones
- TV announcers (ESPN+/MASN): Bob Black (play-by-play), Chris Anderson (analyst) and Matt Smith (sideline)

Game information

First quarter

- No scoring plays

Second quarter

- (13:36) LEH - Luke Yoder 51-yard run, Connor Poole kick failed (Drive: 7 Plays, 80 yards, 3:32; LEH 6–0)
- (7:30) RICH - Jack Callaghan 5-yard pass to Bryce Allen, Kyle Bitsko kick (Drive: 10 Plays, 75 yards, 6:06; RICH 7–6)
- (0:13) RICH - Aziz Foster-Powell 1-yard run, Kyle Bitsko kick (Drive: 6 Plays, 55 yards, 1:07; RICH 14–6)

Third quarter

- (9:27) LEH - Patrick Coan 15-yard pass to Aiden Schomp, Connor Poole kick (Drive: 11 Plays, 75 yards, 5:33; RICH 14–13)

Fourth quarter

- (4:21) LEH - Joseph Marranca 0-yard run, Patrick Coan pass to Joseph Marranca for two-point conversion (Drive: 11 Plays, 69 yards, 6:42; LEH 21–14)

Statistics	LEH	RICH
First downs	15	21
Plays–yards	59–270	63–331
Rushes–yards	38–188	32–124
Passing yards	82	207
Passing: Comp–Att–Int	10–21–0	23–31–0
Turnovers	0	0
Time of possession	28:44	31:16

Team	Category	Player	Statistics
Lehigh	Passing	Patrick Coan	10/21, 82 yards, TD
Lehigh	Rushing	Luke Yoder	28 carries, 147 yards, TD
Lehigh	Receiving	Nick Palumbo	2 receptions, 24 yards
Richmond	Passing	Jack Callaghan	23/31, 207 yards, TD
Richmond	Rushing	Aziz Foster-Powell	13 carries, 58 yards, TD
Richmond	Receiving	Quanye Veney	6 receptions, 94 yards

=== William & Mary (Capital Cup) ===
William & Mary Tribe (4–7) at Richmond Spiders (6–5) – Game summary

Quarter	1	2	3	4	Total
Tribe	7	2	7	0	16
Spiders	0	3	14	0	17

at E. Claiborne Robins Stadium • Richmond, VA

- Date: November 21
- Game time: noon EST
- Game weather: Sunny • Temperature: 61 °F (16 °C)
- Game attendance: 6,195
- Referee: Anthony Florio
- TV announcers (ESPN+/MASN): Bob Black (play-by-play), Chris Anderson (analyst) and Guerin Austin (sideline)

Game information

First quarter

- (1:27) W&M - Jah'Kei Chavis 4-yard run, Max Lipinski kick (Drive: 9 Plays, 66 yards, 4:45; W&M 7–0)

Second quarter

- (10:11) W&M - 0-yard intentional grounding safety (W&M 9–0)
- (4:16) RICH - Kyle Bitsko 28-yard field goal (Drive: 8 Plays, 76 yards, 3:59; W&M 9–3)

Third quarter

- (12:16) W&M - Carter Carroll 6-yard pass to Kai Austin, Max Lipinski kick (Drive: 6 Plays, 71 yards, 2:38; W&M 16–3)
- (10:02) RICH - Jack Callaghan 7-yard pass to Bryce Allen, Kyle Bitsko kick (Drive: 4 Plays, 75 yards, 2:14; W&M 16–10)
- (1:15) RICH - Aziz Foster-Powell 3-yard run, Kyle Bitsko kick (Drive: 9 Plays, 65 yards, 4:33; RICH 17–16)

Fourth quarter

No scoring plays

Statistics	W&M	RICH
First downs	15	15
Plays–yards	60–285	62–380
Rushes–yards	35–179	46–259
Passing yards	106	121
Passing: Comp–Att–Int	9–25–2	7–16–1
Turnovers	2	1
Time of possession	26:48	33:12

Team	Category	Player	Statistics
William & Mary	Passing	Carter Carroll	9/25, 106 yards, TD, 2 INT
William & Mary	Rushing	Andrew King	22 carries, 102 yards
William & Mary	Receiving	Kai Austin	3 receptions, 27 yards, TD
Richmond	Passing	Jack Callaghan	6/15, 101 yards, TD, INT
Richmond	Rushing	Aziz Foster-Powell	24 carries, 200 yards, TD
Richmond	Receiving	Andreas Hill	2 receptions, 44 yards

== Rankings ==
Ranking movements Legend: ██ Increase in ranking ██ Decrease in ranking — = Not ranked RV = Received votes
	Week														
Poll	Pre	1	2	3	4	5	6	7	8	9	10	11	12	13	Final
STATS FCS	RV	RV	RV	RV	RV	24	19	RV	25	21	RV	RV	—		
Coaches	RV	23	21	RV	19	17	15	22	19	19	RV	RV	—		
