= Jeff Behrman =

American football coach (born c. 1973)

Current position
- Title: Head coach
- Team: Bucknell
- Conference: Patriot League
- Record: 1–10

Biographical details
- Born: c. 1972 (age 53–54)
- Education: John Carroll University (1995); West Virginia University (1998)

Playing career
- 1991–1995: John Carroll
- Position: Quarterback

Coaching career (HC unless noted)
- 1996: Clarion (GA)
- 1997–1998: Glenville State (WR/TE)
- 1999: Blackburn (OC/QB/RB/WR/TE)
- 2000–2001: Trinity (CT) (QB)
- 2002–2003: Hofstra (WR)
- 2004–2005: Trinity (CT) (OC)
- 2006–2015: Stony Brook (OC/QB)
- 2016–2022: Union (NY)
- 2023–2025: John Carroll
- 2026–present: Bucknell

Head coaching record
- Overall: 73–37
- Tournaments: 5–3 (NCAA D-III playoffs)

Accomplishments and honors

Championships
- 1 Liberty (2019); 1 NCAC (2025)

Jeff Behrman (born c. 1973) is an American college football coach. He is the head football coach for Bucknell University, a position he has held since 2026. He was the head football coach for Union College from 2016 to 2022 and John Carroll University from 2023 to 2025. He also coached for Clarion, Glenville State, Blackburn, Trinity (CT), Hofstra, and Stony Brook. He played college football for John Carroll as a quarterback.

== Head coaching record ==
Year	Team	Overall	Conference	Standing	Bowl/playoffs	D3^{#}	AFCA^{°}
Union Dutchmen (Liberty League) (2016–2022)
2016	Union	3–7	2–5	7th			
2017	Union	7–4	3–2	T–3rd			
2018	Union	7–2	3–2	T–3rd			
2019	Union	11–1	6–0	1st	L NCAA Division III Second Round	12	
2020–21	No team—COVID-19						
2021	Union	8–2	4–2	T–3rd			
2022	Union	7–4	4–2	3rd			
Union:		43–20	22–13				
John Carroll Blue Streaks (Ohio Athletic Conference) (2023–2024)
2023	John Carroll	8–2	8–1	2nd		20	
2024	John Carroll	9–3	8–1	2nd	L NCAA Division III Second Round		
John Carroll Blue Streaks (North Coast Athletic Conference) (2025)
2025	John Carroll	12–2	8–0	1st	L NCAA Division III Semifinal	5	3
John Carroll:		29–7	24–2				
Bucknell Bison (Patriot League) (2026–present)
2026	Bucknell	1–10	0–8	10th			
Bucknell:		1–10	0–8				
Total:		73–37					
National championship Conference title Conference division title or championship game berth
