= George Jennings (American football) =

American football coach and physician

Biographical details
- Born: 1872; Pasquotank County, North Carolina, U.S.
- Died: September 30, 1918 (aged 45–46); Burlington, New Jersey, U.S.
- Education: Bucknell (1897); Baltimore Medical (MD, 1902)

Coaching career (HC unless noted)
- 1897–1898: Bucknell

Administrative career (AD unless noted)
- 1918: Burlington City HS (NJ)

Head coaching record
- Overall: 7–7–4

George Albert Jennings (1872 – September 30, 1918) was an American college football coach, athletic administrator, and physician. He served as the head football coach at his alma mater, Bucknell University, from 1897 to 1898, compiling a record of 7–7–4.

Jennings played football at Bucknell, where he was a member of Kappa Sigma fraternity. After graduating, he played two seasons with the Duquesne Country and Athletic Club of Pittsburgh. He earned a medical degree from Baltimore Medical College in 1902 and, at the time of his death, served as an athletic director for the Burlington Public Schools in Burlington, New Jersey.

== Head coaching record ==
Year	Team	Overall	Conference	Standing	Bowl/playoffs
Bucknell (Independent) (1897–1898)
1897	Bucknell	3–3–1			
1898	Bucknell	4–4–3			
Bucknell:		7–7–4			
Total:		7–7–4			
