= Bucknell Bison football =

Football team of Bucknell University

2026 Bucknell Bison football team
- First season: 1883; 143 years ago
- Head coach: Jeff Behrman; 1st season, 0–0 (–)
- Location: Lewisburg, Pennsylvania, U.S.
- Stadium: Christy Mathewson–Memorial Stadium (capacity: 13,100)
- NCAA division: Division I FCS
- Conference: Patriot League
- Colors: Blue and orange
- All-time record: 625–641–51 (.494)
- Bowl record: 1–0 (1.000)

Conference championships
- Patriot League: 1996

Uniforms
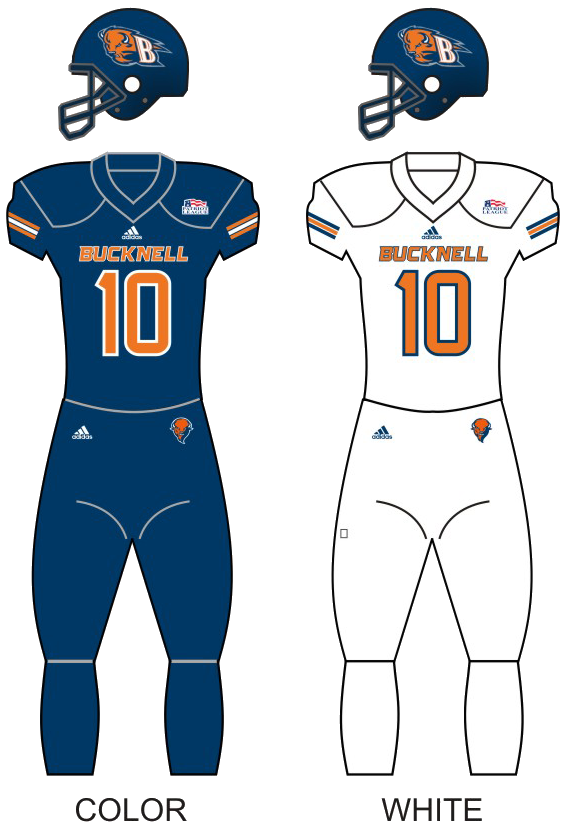
- Website: BucknellBison.com

The Bucknell Bison football team represents Bucknell University in college football at the NCAA Division I Football Championship Subdivision (formerly Division I-AA) level. Bucknell is a member of the Patriot League. Bucknell won the first Orange Bowl, 26–0, over the Miami Hurricanes on January 1, 1935.

== History ==
The Bucknell football team was established in 1883 after a group of students from Lafayette College journeyed west to play a group of students from the University at Lewisburg, as Bucknell University was then called. The Lewisburg students lost the game, 59–0, and did not play another game until 1887. In 1918, Bucknell had its first of its three undefeated seasons. On October 10, 1925, Bucknell played George Washington at home on the day that Christy Mathewson was buried in Lewisburg. In his honor, there was no cheering in the first quarter. In 1931, Clarke Hinkle led Bucknell to a 6–0–3 record. In 1960, the team won its first Lambert Cup. In 1989, the newly renovated Christy Mathewson–Memorial Stadium was renamed in Mathewson's honor. In 1996, Bucknell won its first conference championship. Bucknell football celebrated its seventh-straight winning season in 2001.

=== Classifications ===
- 1937: NCAA College Division
- 1938–1947: NCAA University Division
- 1948–1972: NCAA College Division
- 1973–1977: NCAA Division II
- 1978–present: NCAA Division I–AA/FCS

=== Conference memberships ===
- 1881–1957: Independent
- 1958–1969: Middle Atlantic Conference
- 1970–1972: NCAA College Division independent
- 1973–1977: NCAA Division II independent
- 1978–1985: NCAA Division I–AA independent
- 1986–present: Patriot League

== Conference championships ==
Years	Conference	Overall Record	Conference Record
1996	Patriot League	6–5	4–1

== Bowl games ==
Year	Coach	Bowl	Opponent	Results
1934	Edward Mylin	Orange Bowl	Miami	W 26–0

== Individual award winners ==
=== College Football Hall of Fame ===
Player	Position	Career	Year inducted
Clarke Hinkle	FB	1929–1931	1971

=== Pro Football Hall of Fame ===
Player	Position	Bucknell career	NFL team(s)	NFL career	Year inducted
Clarke Hinkle	FB	1929–1931	Green Bay Packers	1932–1941	1964

== Future non-conference opponents ==
Announced schedules as of August 24, 2026.

2026	2027	2029	2031
at VMI	VMI	at Delaware	at Akron
Penn			
at Pittsburgh			
