= 1897 college football rankings =

- Season: 1897
- Bowl season: 1897–98 bowl games
- End of season champions: Pennsylvania; Yale

The 1897 college football season rankings included a ranking by New York City newspaper The Sun.

== The Sun ==
In November 1897, New York City newspaper The Sun published a top-thirteen ranking of teams.

Rank	Team	Record
1	Penn	15–0
1	Yale	9–0–2
3	Princeton	10–1
4	Harvard	10–1–1
5	Cornell	5–3–1
6	Army	6–1–1
7	Brown	7–4
8	Carlisle	6–4
9	Lafayette	9–2–1
10	Wesleyan	6–6
11	Dartmouth	4–3
12	Amherst	2–6–2
13	Williams	1–7–1

== See also ==
- 1897 College Football All-America Team
