= Wilfred Arnold (American football) =

American football coach and politician (1871–1943)

Biographical details
- Born: June 24, 1871; Galesburg, Illinois, U.S.
- Died: September 30, 1943 (aged 72); Galesburg, Illinois, U.S.

Playing career

Football
- 1890–1893: Knox (IL)

Coaching career (HC unless noted)

Football
- 1897: Knox (IL)

Head coaching record
- Overall: 4–4

Wilfred Arnold (June 24, 1871 – September 30, 1943) was an American college football coach and Illinois General Assembly member. He served as the head football coach at Knox College in Galesburg, Illinois for one season, in 1897, compiling a record of 4–4. He attended Harvard Law School from 1895 to 1896 before serving as a member of the Illinois General Assembly from 1903 to 1905.

== Head coaching record ==
Year	Team	Overall	Bowl/playoffs
Knox Old Siwash (Independent) (1897)
1897	Knox	4–4	
Knox:		4–4	
Total:		4–4	
