= C. W. Dibble =

American football player and coach (1876–1948)

Biographical details
- Born: October 23, 1876; Perry, New York, U.S.
- Died: September 14, 1948 (aged 71); North Adams, Massachusetts, U.S.

Playing career
- 1896: Williams

Coaching career (HC unless noted)
- 1897: Buffalo

Head coaching record
- Overall: 7–0

Condit Woodhull Dibble (October 23, 1876 – September 14, 1948) was an American college football player and coach. He played as a halfback at Lawrenceville School, a prep school in New Jersey, and briefly for Williams College in Williamstown, Massachusetts. As a coach, he was in charge of the 1897 Buffalo football team.

At Lawrenceville, Dibble was one of the school's greatest ever football players because of his prowess and speed, qualities which earned him the nickname "Flash". His success was celebrated in an Owen Johnson novel about Lawrenceville entitled The Varmint.

In the fall of 1896, Dibble entered Williams College. During an October 3, 1896 game against Harvard, was apparently kicked in the head. Two weeks later, he lost consciousness and diagnosed with a brain abscess. So severe was his illness that he was feared to have permanently lost his sanity. In the event, he recovered, but he subsequently suffered from episodes of amnesia that robbed him of the ability to remember anyone from his home town apart from his closest family. His medical situation made national news.

Dibble was treated by a Buffalo, New York doctor and cured in June 1897. In 1897, he enrolled at the University of Buffalo. Although still wanting to continue to play football, he wisely agreed to coach instead. The Buffalo team finished the season undefeated at 7–0. He left the school the following year.

Due to his head injury, Dibble never returned to Williams College and never graduated from college. He worked in banking for most of his life in North Adams, Massachusetts. He died on September 14, 1948.

== Head coaching record ==
Year	Team	Overall	Conference	Standing	Bowl/playoffs
Buffalo (Independent) (1897)
1897	Buffalo	7–0			
Buffalo:		7–0			
Total:		7–0			
