= Alfred C. N. Petersen =

American physician and football coach (1868–1933)

Biographical details
- Born: January 12, 1868; Copenhagen, Denmark
- Died: November 6, 1933 (aged 65); Worcester, Massachusetts, U.S.
- Education: University of Pennsylvania Medical School

Coaching career (HC unless noted)
- 1896–1897: Holy Cross

Head coaching record
- Overall: 6–5–3

Alfred Charles N. Petersen (January 12, 1868 – November 6, 1933) was an American physician and college football player and coach. He was the first head football coach at the College of the Holy Cross in Worcester, Massachusetts, serving from 1896 to 1897.

== Early life ==
Petersen was born on January 12, 1868, in Copenhagen to Michael Abraham and Hansine V. (Hansen) Petersen. The family moved to the United States when Petersen was three months old. He attended Worcester Public Schools and graduated from Worcester High School in 1889.

== Athletics ==
In 1891, Petersen enrolled in the University of Pennsylvania, where he was captain of the freshman crew and a member of the school's varsity crew from 1893 to 1895. He also played end on the Penn Quakers football team. Petersen was the head football coach at the College of the Holy Cross in 1896 and 1897 and compiled a 6–5–3 record. He also coached and rowed for the Worcester crew.

== Medicine ==
Petersen graduated from the University of Pennsylvania Medical School in 1897. He completed his internship at Worcester City Hospital then went into private practice in Worcester.

In addition to his medical practice, Petersen was also a director of the New Tubercular Home, president of the Public Coal Company, and a trustee of the Worcester Free Public Library.

== Personal life ==
On October 11, 1899, Petersen married Anna H. Lucke, they had one son, Alfred Herman Petersen. Petersen died on November 6, 1933.

== Head coaching record ==
Year	Team	Overall	Conference	Standing	Bowl/playoffs
Holy Cross (Independent) (1896–1897)
1896	Holy Cross	2–2–2			
1897	Holy Cross	4–3–1			
Holy Cross:		6–5–3			
Total:		6–5–3			
