= 1897 Massachusetts Aggies football team =

American college football season

1897 Massachusetts Aggies football
- Conference: Athletic League of New England State Colleges
- Record: 2–5–1 (0–1 New England)
- Head coach: None
- Home stadium: Alumni Field

The 1897 Massachusetts Aggies football team represented Massachusetts Agricultural College in the 1897 college football season. The team played its home games at Alumni Field in Amherst, Massachusetts. Massachusetts finished the season with a record of 2–5–1.

== Schedule ==
Date	Time	Opponent	Site	Result	Attendance	Source
September 25		Holy Cross	Alumni Field; Amherst, MA	L 0–4		
September 29		at Amherst	Pratt Field; Amherst, MA	L 4–20	200	
October 2		New Hampshire	Alumni Field; Amherst, MA (rivalry)	W 10–4		
October 6	4:00 p.m.	at Wesleyan	Pameacha Park; Middletown, CT	L 5–18		
October 9		at Trinity (CT)	Hartford, CT	L 5–26		
October 16		Shelburne Falls	Alumni Field; Amherst, MA	T 0–0		
October 23		Williston Seminary	Alumni Field; Amherst, MA	L 4–6		
November 6		Storrs	Alumni Field; Amherst, MA (rivalry)	W 36–0		
