= Clinton Wood =

American football player and coach

Biographical details
- Born: January 15, 1869; Carlisle, Ohio, U.S.
- Died: January 23, 1932 (aged 63); Boston, Massachusetts, U.S.

Playing career

Football
- 1888–1891: Princeton

Lacrosse
- 1890–1891: Princeton

Coaching career (HC unless noted)

Football
- 1892–1894: Princeton Prep
- 1896–1897: Washington & Jefferson
- 1920: Wooster (freshmen)

Head coaching record
- Overall: 18–1–1 (college)

Clinton Tyler Wood (January 15, 1869 – January 23, 1932) was an American college football player and coach. He served as the head football coach at Washington & Jefferson College in Washington, Pennsylvania from 1896 to 1897, compiling a record of 18–1–1.

Wood was born on January 15, 1869, in Carlisle, Ohio, to Reverend Francis Marion and Martha Jane Van Tuyl Wood. He attended Princeton University, where he played on the football team from 1888 to 1891 and the lacrosse team from 1890 to 1891. Wood earned a Bachelor of Arts degree from in 1892 and a Master of Arts degree in 1895 from Princeton.

Wood died on January 23, 1932, in Boston. He was buried at Woodlawn Cemetery in Detroit.

== Head coaching record ==
=== College ===
| Year | Team | Overall | Conference | Standing | Bowl/playoffs |
|---|---|---|---|---|---|
Washington & Jefferson (Independent) (1896–1897)
| 1896 | Washington & Jefferson | 8–0–1 | | | |
| 1897 | Washington & Jefferson | 10–1 | | | |
| Washington & Jefferson: | | 18–1–1 | | | |
| Total: | | 18–1–1 | | | |
