= 1897 Pittsburgh College football team =

American college football season

1897 Pittsburgh College football
- Conference: Independent
- Record: 4–5–2
- Head coach: J. P. Wolfe (1st season)

1897 Eastern college football independents records
	Conf.			Overall
Team	W	L	T	W		L		T
Penn		–		15	–	0	–	0
Princeton		–		10	–	1	–	0
Washington & Jefferson		–		10	–	1	–	0
Yale		–		9	–	0	–	2
Buffalo		–		9	–	1	–	0
Harvard		–		10	–	1	–	1
Army		–		6	–	1	–	1
Vermont		–		3	–	0	–	2
Lafayette		–		9	–	2	–	1
Drexel		–		6	–	2	–	1
Colgate		–		5	–	2	–	1
Dickinson		–		7	–	3	–	2
Swarthmore		–		7	–	3	–	2
Fordham		–		2	–	1	–	1
Cornell		–		5	–	3	–	1
Syracuse		–		5	–	3	–	1
Brown		–		7	–	4	–	0
Carlisle		–		6	–	4	–	0
Boston College		–		4	–	3	–	0
Holy Cross		–		4	–	3	–	1
Wesleyan		–		8	–	7	–	0
Bucknell		–		3	–	3	–	1
NYU		–		3	–	3	–	0
Temple		–		3	–	3	–	0
Trinity (CT)		–		4	–	4	–	1
Tufts		–		6	–	7	–	0
Geneva		–		3	–	4	–	1
Pittsburgh College		–		3	–	5	–	2
Villanova		–		3	–	5	–	1
Penn State		–		3	–	6	–	0
Amherst		–		2	–	6	–	2
Franklin & Marshall		–		2	–	6	–	2
Lehigh		–		3	–	7	–	0
New Hampshire		–		2	–	5	–	0
Rutgers		–		2	–	5	–	0
Western Univ. Penn.		–		1	–	3	–	0

The 1897 Pittsburgh College football team was an American football team that represented Pittsburgh Catholic College of the Holy Ghost—now known as Duquesne University—during the 1897 college football season. It was the first Pittsburgh College team to consist entirely of students from the college. J. P. Wolfe served in his first and only season as the team's head coach.

== Schedule ==
Date	Opponent	Site	Result	Attendance	Source
October 1	Pittsburgh High School	Pittsburgh College grounds; Pittsburgh, PA	W 6–2		
October 2	Cottage Club	Pittsburgh College grounds; Pittsburgh, PA	W 12–0		
October 9	Bethany (WV)	Pittsburgh College grounds; Pittsburgh, PA	W 14–0		
October 13	at Latrobe Athletic Association	Latrobe, PA	L 0–22		
October 16	at Washington & Jefferson	College Park; Washington, PA	L 0–24	400	
October 23	at Geneva	Beaver Falls, PA	L 5–26		
October 30	West Virginia	Pittsburgh College grounds; Pittsburgh, PA	T 0–0		
November 6	at Washington & Jefferson	College Park; Washington, PA	L 0–36		
November 13	Marquette Athletic Club	Pittsburgh College grounds; Pittsburgh, PA	W 38–0		
November 20	McKees Rocks Indians	Pittsburgh College grounds; Pittsburgh, PA	L 4–6		
November 25	Wheeling Athletic Club	Wheeling, WV	T 6–6	> 1,000	
