= 1897 Washington & Jefferson football team =

American college football season

1897 Washington & Jefferson football
- Conference: Independent
- Record: 10–1
- Head coach: Clinton Wood (2nd season)
- Captain: John H. Flowers
- Home stadium: College Park

1897 Eastern college football independents records
	Conf.			Overall
Team	W	L	T	W		L		T
Penn		–		15	–	0	–	0
Princeton		–		10	–	1	–	0
Washington & Jefferson		–		10	–	1	–	0
Yale		–		9	–	0	–	2
Buffalo		–		9	–	1	–	0
Harvard		–		10	–	1	–	1
Army		–		6	–	1	–	1
Vermont		–		3	–	0	–	2
Lafayette		–		9	–	2	–	1
Drexel		–		6	–	2	–	1
Colgate		–		5	–	2	–	1
Dickinson		–		7	–	3	–	2
Swarthmore		–		7	–	3	–	2
Fordham		–		2	–	1	–	1
Cornell		–		5	–	3	–	1
Syracuse		–		5	–	3	–	1
Brown		–		7	–	4	–	0
Carlisle		–		6	–	4	–	0
Boston College		–		4	–	3	–	0
Holy Cross		–		4	–	3	–	1
Wesleyan		–		8	–	7	–	0
Bucknell		–		3	–	3	–	1
NYU		–		3	–	3	–	0
Temple		–		3	–	3	–	0
Trinity (CT)		–		4	–	4	–	1
Tufts		–		6	–	7	–	0
Geneva		–		3	–	4	–	1
Pittsburgh College		–		3	–	5	–	2
Villanova		–		3	–	5	–	1
Penn State		–		3	–	6	–	0
Amherst		–		2	–	6	–	2
Franklin & Marshall		–		2	–	6	–	2
Lehigh		–		3	–	7	–	0
New Hampshire		–		2	–	5	–	0
Rutgers		–		2	–	5	–	0
Western Univ. Penn.		–		1	–	3	–	0

The 1897 Washington & Jefferson football team was an American football team that represented Washington & Jefferson College as an independent during the 1897 college football season. Led by Clinton Wood in his second and final year as head coach, the team compiled a record of 10–1, shutting out their opponents in all ten victories. Quarterback John H. Flowers was the team captain.

== Schedule ==
Date	Time	Opponent	Site	Result	Attendance	Source
September 26		Bethany (WV)	Washington, PA	W 56–0		
September 29	3:47 p.m.	at Penn	Franklin Field; Philadelphia, PA	L 4–18	1,000	
October 2		Geneva	College Park; Washington, PA	W 12–0	850	
October 9		Westminster (PA)	College Park; Washington, PA	W 16–0	750	
October 16		Pittsburgh College	College Park; Washington, PA	W 24–0	400	
October 23		West Virginia	College Park; Washington, PA	W 12–0	1,200	
October 30		at Pittsburgh Athletic Club	P. A. C. Park; Pittsburgh, PA	W 18–0	4,000–5,500	
November 6		Pittsburgh College	College Park; Washington, PA	W 36–0		
November 13		Western Reserve	College Park; Washington, PA	W 6–0	600	
November 18		Waynesburg	Washington, PA	W 22–0		
November 25		at Duquesne Country and Athletic Club	Exposition Park; Allegheny, PA	W 14–0	12,000–20,000	
