= 1897 Colgate football team =

American college football season

1897 Colgate football
- Conference: Independent
- Record: 5–2–1
- Head coach: Charles B. Mason (1st season)
- Captain: Walter Cramp

1897 Eastern college football independents records
	Conf.			Overall
Team	W	L	T	W		L		T
Penn		–		15	–	0	–	0
Princeton		–		10	–	1	–	0
Washington & Jefferson		–		10	–	1	–	0
Yale		–		9	–	0	–	2
Buffalo		–		9	–	1	–	0
Harvard		–		10	–	1	–	1
Army		–		6	–	1	–	1
Vermont		–		3	–	0	–	2
Lafayette		–		9	–	2	–	1
Drexel		–		6	–	2	–	1
Colgate		–		5	–	2	–	1
Dickinson		–		7	–	3	–	2
Swarthmore		–		7	–	3	–	2
Fordham		–		2	–	1	–	1
Cornell		–		5	–	3	–	1
Syracuse		–		5	–	3	–	1
Brown		–		7	–	4	–	0
Carlisle		–		6	–	4	–	0
Boston College		–		4	–	3	–	0
Holy Cross		–		4	–	3	–	1
Wesleyan		–		8	–	7	–	0
Bucknell		–		3	–	3	–	1
NYU		–		3	–	3	–	0
Temple		–		3	–	3	–	0
Trinity (CT)		–		4	–	4	–	1
Tufts		–		6	–	7	–	0
Geneva		–		3	–	4	–	1
Pittsburgh College		–		3	–	5	–	2
Villanova		–		3	–	5	–	1
Penn State		–		3	–	6	–	0
Franklin & Marshall		–		2	–	6	–	2
Lehigh		–		3	–	7	–	0
New Hampshire		–		2	–	5	–	0
Rutgers		–		2	–	5	–	0
Western Univ. Penn.		–		1	–	3	–	0

The 1897 Colgate football team represented Colgate University in the 1897 college football season. The team captain for the 1897 season was Walter Cramp.

== Schedule ==
Date	Opponent	Site	Result	Attendance	Source
September 25	at Cornell	Ithaca, NY (rivalry)	L 0–6		
October 9	St. John's Military Academy	Hamilton, NY	W 6–0		
October 16	Syracuse	Hamilton, NY (rivalry)	T 6–6		
October 30	at Williams	Weston Field; Williamstown, MA	W 18–0	800	
November 3	at Hobart	Auburn, NY	W 18–0		
November 6	Union (NY)	Hamilton, NY	W 6–0		
November 13	at Hamilton	Utica, NY	W 12–6		
November 25	at Rochester	Rochester, NY	L 0–8		
