= 1897 Rutgers Queensmen football team =

American college football season

1897 Rutgers Queensmen football
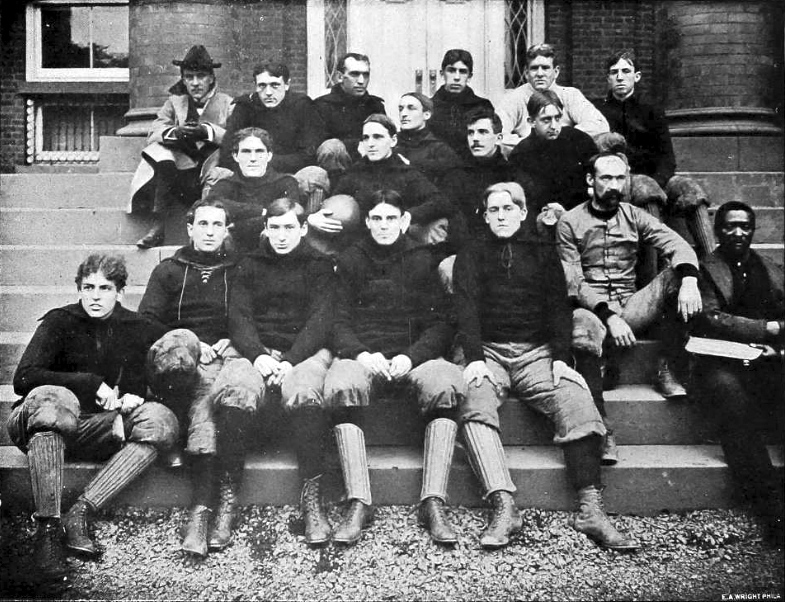
- Conference: Independent
- Record: 2–5
- Head coach: John C. B. Pendleton (2nd season)
- Captain: F. K. W. Drury
- Home stadium: Neilson Field

1897 Eastern college football independents records
	Conf.			Overall
Team	W	L	T	W		L		T
Penn		–		15	–	0	–	0
Princeton		–		10	–	1	–	0
Washington & Jefferson		–		10	–	1	–	0
Yale		–		9	–	0	–	2
Buffalo		–		9	–	1	–	0
Harvard		–		10	–	1	–	1
Army		–		6	–	1	–	1
Vermont		–		3	–	0	–	2
Lafayette		–		9	–	2	–	1
Drexel		–		6	–	2	–	1
Colgate		–		5	–	2	–	1
Dickinson		–		7	–	3	–	2
Swarthmore		–		7	–	3	–	2
Fordham		–		2	–	1	–	1
Cornell		–		5	–	3	–	1
Syracuse		–		5	–	3	–	1
Brown		–		7	–	4	–	0
Carlisle		–		6	–	4	–	0
Boston College		–		4	–	3	–	0
Holy Cross		–		4	–	3	–	1
Wesleyan		–		8	–	7	–	0
Bucknell		–		3	–	3	–	1
NYU		–		3	–	3	–	0
Temple		–		3	–	3	–	0
Trinity (CT)		–		4	–	4	–	1
Tufts		–		6	–	7	–	0
Geneva		–		3	–	4	–	1
Pittsburgh College		–		3	–	5	–	2
Villanova		–		3	–	5	–	1
Penn State		–		3	–	6	–	0
Amherst		–		2	–	6	–	2
Franklin & Marshall		–		2	–	6	–	2
Lehigh		–		3	–	7	–	0
New Hampshire		–		2	–	5	–	0
Rutgers		–		2	–	5	–	0
Western Univ. Penn.		–		1	–	3	–	0

The 1897 Rutgers Queensmen football team was an American football team that represented Rutgers University as an independent during the 1897 college football season. The 1897 Rutgers team compiled a 2–5 record. John C. B. Pendleton was the team's coach and F. K. W. Drury was the team captain.

== Schedule ==
Date	Opponent	Site	Result	Attendance	Source
October 2	at Newark Field Club	Newark, NJ	W 12–6		
October 6	at Princeton	University Field; Princeton, NJ (rivalry)	L 0–53		
October 16	Swarthmore	Neilson Field; New Brunswick, NJ	L 6–8		
October 23	Stevens	Neilson Field; New Brunswick, NJ	W 16–0		
October 27	at Haverford	Haverford, PA	L 0–28		
October 30	vs. Union (NY)	Albany, NY	L 0–10		
November 3	at Stevens	Hoboken, NJ	L 0–14	several hundred	
November 6	at Navy	Worden Field; Annapolis, MD	Cancelled		

== Players ==
- Decker, right tackle
- F. K. W. Drury, quarterback and captain
- Guthrie, fullback
- McMahon, left guard
- Oram, right halfback
- Patterson, right guard
- Pettit, right end
- Rapalje, left end
- Ryno, left halfback
- Van Winkle, left tackle
- Woodruff, center
