= 1897 Western University of Pennsylvania football team =

American college football season

1897 Western University of Pennsylvania football
- Conference: Independent
- Record: 1–3
- Head coach: Thomas Trenchard (1st season)

1897 Eastern college football independents records
	Conf.			Overall
Team	W	L	T	W		L		T
Penn		–		15	–	0	–	0
Princeton		–		10	–	1	–	0
Washington & Jefferson		–		10	–	1	–	0
Yale		–		9	–	0	–	2
Buffalo		–		9	–	1	–	0
Harvard		–		10	–	1	–	1
Army		–		6	–	1	–	1
Vermont		–		3	–	0	–	2
Lafayette		–		9	–	2	–	1
Drexel		–		6	–	2	–	1
Colgate		–		5	–	2	–	1
Dickinson		–		7	–	3	–	2
Swarthmore		–		7	–	3	–	2
Fordham		–		2	–	1	–	1
Cornell		–		5	–	3	–	1
Syracuse		–		5	–	3	–	1
Brown		–		7	–	4	–	0
Carlisle		–		6	–	4	–	0
Boston College		–		4	–	3	–	0
Holy Cross		–		4	–	3	–	1
Wesleyan		–		8	–	7	–	0
Bucknell		–		3	–	3	–	1
NYU		–		3	–	3	–	0
Temple		–		3	–	3	–	0
Trinity (CT)		–		4	–	4	–	1
Tufts		–		6	–	7	–	0
Geneva		–		3	–	4	–	1
Pittsburgh College		–		3	–	5	–	2
Villanova		–		3	–	5	–	1
Penn State		–		3	–	6	–	0
Amherst		–		2	–	6	–	2
Franklin & Marshall		–		2	–	6	–	2
Lehigh		–		3	–	7	–	0
New Hampshire		–		2	–	5	–	0
Rutgers		–		2	–	5	–	0
Western Univ. Penn.		–		1	–	3	–	0

The 1897 Western University of Pennsylvania football team was an American football team that represented the Western University of Pennsylvania (now known as the University of Pittsburgh) as an independent during the 1897 college football season.

== Schedule ==
Date	Opponent	Site	Result	Source
October 8	Pittsburgh High School	Pittsburgh, PA	W 4–0	
October 27	at Latrobe Athletic Association	Latrobe, PA	L 0–30	
November 3	at Greensburg Athletic Association	Greensburg, PA	L 0–47	
November 25	at Waynesburg	Waynesburg, PA	L 5–14	

== Season recap ==
On December 8, 1896, Thomas "Doggie" Trenchard was engaged to train the Western University of Pennsylvania (WUP) athletes commencing on January 1. His appointment rekindled hope that the WUP would regain some measure of respect in athletic competitions. Trenchard was an 1895 graduate of Princeton University, where he played baseball and football all four years and captained the undefeated 1893 Princeton Tigers football team that won the national championship. Upon graduation, he coached at the University of North Carolina for the 1895 season and then at West Virginia University for the 1896 season prior to taking the position with WUP. According to the Western University Courant, the reason for the ineptitude of the athletic programs was twofold. First, the transfer students who were athletes preferred to play for the local club teams. Second, the remaining student body was too apathetic to be bothered with the rigors of training for a spot on the team. The Pittsburg Press analyzed the season best -

"This institution (W.U.P.) had the advantage of a first class coach. There are few better players than Coach Trenchard, but somehow W.U.P. could not get together a team worthy to play under the colors. There was a lack of interest among the men and the faculty. Trenchard worked hard. There were players in the college, but sometimes they would put in an appearance for practice and sometimes they would not. The latter was most frequently the case, and so the hands of the coach were practically tied. It is understood that the university will make greater efforts to get together a winning team next year. Already preparations are under way and if present plans pan out well W.U.P. will be in a position to cope with any eleven this end of the state."

In its first and only season under head coach Thomas Trenchard, the team compiled a 1–3 record and was outscored by a total of 91 to 9.

== Game summaries ==
=== Pittsburgh High School ===
Pittsburgh High School at WUP

Team	1	2	Total
Pittsburgh H. S.	0	0	0
• WUP	0	4	4

- Date: October 8, 1897
- Location: University Grounds, Pittsburgh
- Referee: Steel

On October 8, 1897, the WUP eleven played a practice game against the Pittsburgh High School team. The game consisted of 15-minute halves. The WUP eleven played a sloppy game and were unable to score until coach Trenchard inserted himself into the lineup and carried the ball over the goal line in the final two minutes. The final score was 4–0 in favor of WUP. Coach Trenchard's early season frustrations were summarized best in the October 22nd issue of The Pittsburg Press:

"W.U.P. is making great efforts to get together a football team. At least Coach Trenchard is trying to. If Trenchard had more hearty co-operation of the students and faculty the prospects for a champion team would certainly be brighter."

The starting lineup for the game with Pittsburgh High was Al Marshall (left end), Mitchell (left tackle), McDonald (left guard), Reidle (center), Watt (right guard), Kauffman (right tackle), Riley (right end), Kintner (quarterback), Morrow (left halfback), Sample (right halfback) and Kier (fullback). Coach Trenchard replaced Kier at fullback.

=== At Latrobe Athletic Association ===
WUP at Latrobe A. A.

Team	1	2	Total
WUP	0	0	0
• Latrobe A. A.	12	18	30

- Date: October 27, 1897
- Location: Latrobe Grounds, Latrobe, PA
- Game attendance: 1,000
- Referee: Steel

The Latrobe Athletic Association was their next opponent. In 1897, the Latrobe eleven was made up of all professional players. The game at Latrobe, Pa. started on a positive note for The Western U., as the offense with coach Trenchard at halfback, moved the ball to the 10-yard line. The Latrobe defense stiffened and the WUP offense did not come close to scoring again, even though Coach Trenchard had Robinson and Sterrett of the Greensburg A. A. and Rosenbloomm of the P. A. C. in the lineup. Latrobe Halfback Saxman scored two touchdowns in the first half. Ed Abbaticchio kicked the goals after to make the halftime score 12–0 in favor of Latrobe. The second half featured multiple touchdowns by Latrobe. Walter Howard, Campbell and Ed Abbaticchio each crossed the goal for Latrobe and Abbaticchio converted the kicks after making the final score 30–0. Coach Trenchard signed a contract with the Latrobe team after the game.

The WUP lineup for the game with Latrobe was Al Marshall (left end), B. L. Rosenbloom (left tackle), McConkey (left guard), John Blackadore (center), Herman Watt (right guard), Donaldson (right tackle), Albert Riley (right end), S. M. Kier (quarterback), Thomas Trenchard (right halfback), Fred Robinson (left halfback) and William Sterrett (fullback). Victor King replaced Al Marshall at end.

=== At Greensburg Athletic Association ===
With Coach Trenchard out of the lineup due to injuries sustained while playing for Latrobe, the WUP eleven traveled to Greensburg, Pa. to take on the other local "professional" Club team, the Greensburg Athletic Association. Coach Trenchard refereed the game consisting of two twenty minute halves. The men of Greensburg were much too strong for the University eleven and won the game handily by a score of 47–0. The Greensburg team of 1897 had 27 players and was able to use many scrubs in this game. The Greensburg Athletic Association and Washington & Jefferson Presidents ended the season with the best football records in Pennsylvania.

The WUP lineup for the Greensburg game was Collins (left end), B. L. Rosenbloom (left tackle), Kauffman (left guard), Graw (center), Herman Watt (right guard), Harry Donaldson (right tackle), Albert Riley (right end), William Shaler (quarterback), John Morrow (left halfback), Rex (right halfback) and S. M. Kier (fullback). Sterrett and Robinson, who played for WUP versus Latrobe, were in the starting lineup for Greensburg.

=== At Waynesburg ===
WUP at Waynesburg

Team	1	2	Total
WUP	0	5	5
• Waynesburg	10	4	14

- Date: November 25, 1897
- Location: Waynesburg Grounds, Waynesburg, PA
- Referee: Evans

Coach Trenchard returned to his fullback position for the Western University's final game of 1897 with Waynesburg College at Waynesburg, Pa. Waynesburg scored on their opening drive and Ullom kicked the goal after to make the score 6–0. Later in the first half, halfback Sadler of Waynesburg scored a touchdown to make the score 10–0 at the break. Early in the second stanza, Waynesburg scored another touchdown but failed on the kick to bring the score to 14–0. Late in the game the WUP offense advanced the ball down the field to the five-yard line and Trenchard kicked a field goal. WUP avoided another shutout but lost 14–5.

The WUP lineup for the Waynesburg game was Collins (left end), Blackadore (left tackle), Kauffman (left guard), Graw (center), King (right end), B. L. Rosenbloom (right tackle), Herman Watt (right guard), Shaler (quarterback), Robert Sample (left halfback), Albert Riley (right halfback) and Thomas Trenchard (fullback).

== Roster ==
The roster of the 1897 Western University of Pennsylvania football team:

- Albert A. Marshall (end) received his Bachelor of Philosophy degree in 1894 and his Doctor of Laws degree in 1897.
- William H. Mitchell (guard) earned his Mechanical Engineering degree in 1901. He became an inspector for the Niagara Falls Power Company and Canadian Niagara Power Company. He resided in Niagara Falls, N.Y.
- Herman Watt (guard) earned his mechanical engineering degree in 1901 and resided in Huntington, West Virginia.
- Albert Riley (end) received his Mechanical Engineering degree in 1898 and resided in Canonsburg, Pa.
- Samuel Kintner (quarterback) became vice-president of Westinghouse Electric and Manufacturing Company.
- John Morrow (halfback) received his Associate Engineering degree in 1898 and resided in Prescott, Arizona.
- Robert Sample (halfback) received his Bachelor of Law degree in 1900 and resided in Pittsburgh. He previously played football at Washington & Jefferson University prior to entering Law School at WUP.
- S. M. Kier (fullback) earned his Electrical Engineering degree in 1898.
- Dr. Victor King (end) previously played football for Princeton.
- B. L. Rosenbloom (tackle) earned his Associate Law degree in 1900 and resided in North Braddock, Pa.
- John Blackadore (center) received his Civil Engineering degree in 1900 and resided in Pittsburgh.
- Dr. William Sterrett (halfback) earned his Doctor of Medicine degree in 1901 and resided in East Pittsburgh, Pa.
- Fred A. Robinson (halfback) earned his Doctor of Dental Surgery in 1900 and resided in State College. He coached the WUP football team in 1898 and 1899.
- Harry Donaldson (tackle) earned his Associate Engineering degree in 1900 and resided in Cleveland, Ohio.
- William Shaler (quarterback) received his Associate College degree in 1898 and resided in Pittsburgh.
- Rex (halfback)
- Graw (center)
- McDonald (guard)
- Reidle (center)
- Kauffman (tackle)
- Collins (end)
- McConkey (guard)

== Coaching staff ==
- Thomas Trenchard (coach/fullback) previously played football at Princeton and coached at UNC and WVU. He played football for the Latrobe Athletic Club while coaching the WUPs.
