= 1897 NYU Violets football team =

American college football season

1897 NYU Violets football
- Conference: Independent
- Record: 3–3
- Home stadium: Ohio Field

1897 Eastern college football independents records
	Conf.			Overall
Team	W	L	T	W		L		T
Penn		–		15	–	0	–	0
Princeton		–		10	–	1	–	0
Washington & Jefferson		–		10	–	1	–	0
Yale		–		9	–	0	–	2
Buffalo		–		9	–	1	–	0
Harvard		–		10	–	1	–	1
Army		–		6	–	1	–	1
Vermont		–		3	–	0	–	2
Lafayette		–		9	–	2	–	1
Drexel		–		6	–	2	–	1
Colgate		–		5	–	2	–	1
Dickinson		–		7	–	3	–	2
Swarthmore		–		7	–	3	–	2
Fordham		–		2	–	1	–	1
Cornell		–		5	–	3	–	1
Syracuse		–		5	–	3	–	1
Brown		–		7	–	4	–	0
Carlisle		–		6	–	4	–	0
Boston College		–		4	–	3	–	0
Holy Cross		–		4	–	3	–	1
Wesleyan		–		8	–	7	–	0
Bucknell		–		3	–	3	–	1
NYU		–		3	–	3	–	0
Temple		–		3	–	3	–	0
Trinity (CT)		–		4	–	4	–	1
Tufts		–		6	–	7	–	0
Geneva		–		3	–	4	–	1
Pittsburgh College		–		3	–	5	–	2
Villanova		–		3	–	5	–	1
Penn State		–		3	–	6	–	0
Amherst		–		2	–	6	–	2
Franklin & Marshall		–		2	–	6	–	2
Lehigh		–		3	–	7	–	0
New Hampshire		–		2	–	5	–	0
Rutgers		–		2	–	5	–	0
Western Univ. Penn.		–		1	–	3	–	0

The 1897 NYU Violets football team was an American football team that represented New York University as an independent during the 1897 college football season. For the season, the Violets compiled a 3–3 record.

== Schedule ==
Date	Opponent	Site	Result	Attendance	Source
October 9	Stevens	Ohio Field; Bronx, NY	W 24–0	200	
October 16	St. Stephen's	Ohio Field; Bronx, NY	W 18–0		
October 23	Trinity (CT)	Ohio Field; Bronx, NY	L 0–34		
October 27	at Stevens	St. George's Cricket Grounds; Hoboken, NJ	W 4–0		
October 30	New Jersey Athletic Club		Canceled		
November 2	Montclair Athletic Club		Canceled		
November 6	Oritani Football Club		Canceled		
November 13	at Lehigh	Bethlehem, PA	L 0–42		
November 16	at Hamilton	Clinton, NY	L 0–12		
