= Norman Cabot =

American football player (1876–1928)

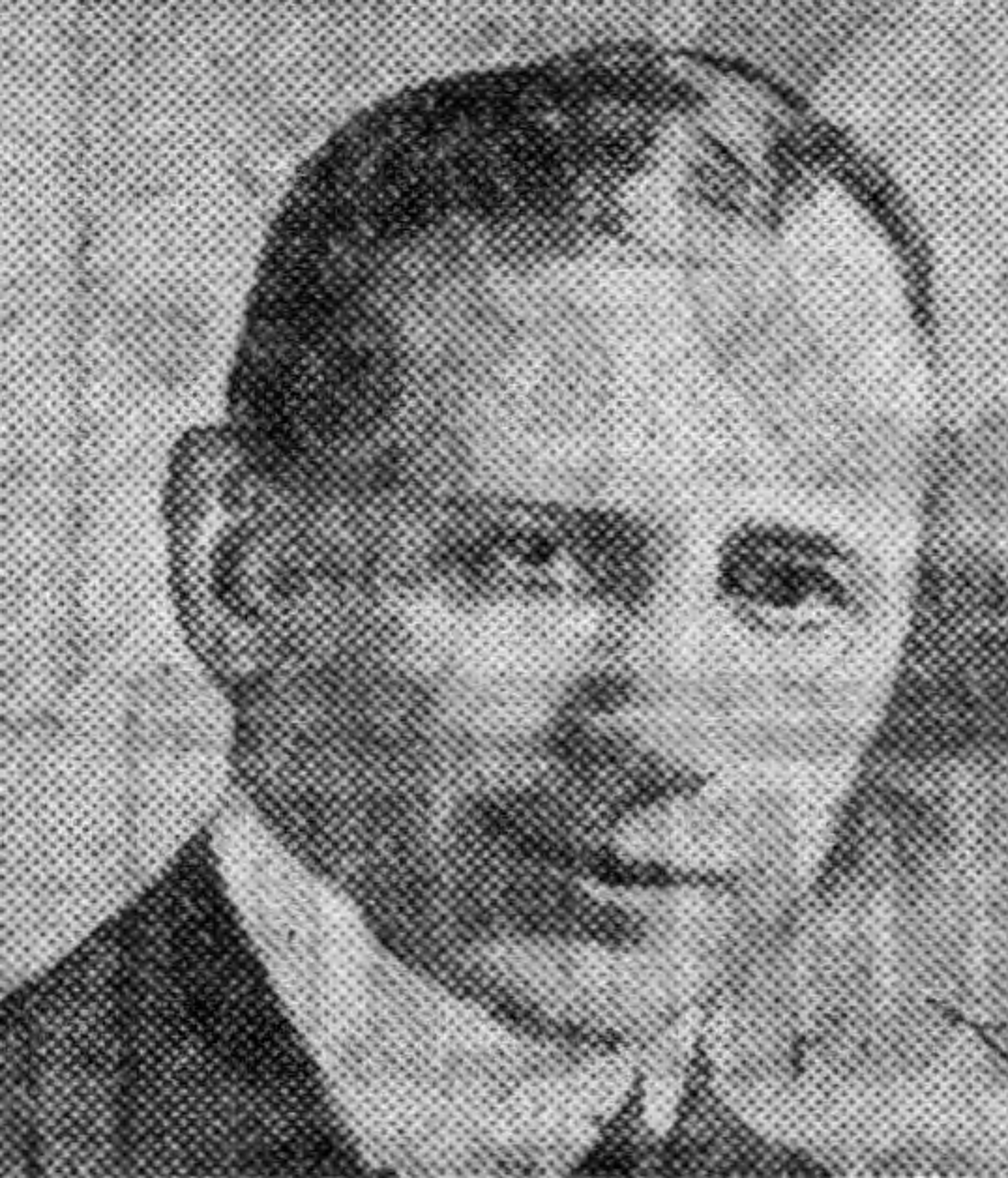

Harvard Crimson
- Position: End

Personal information
- Born: July 1, 1876; Brookline, Massachusetts, U.S.
- Died: April 12, 1928 (aged 51); Brookline, Massachusetts, U.S.

Career information
- College: Harvard (1894–1897)

Awards and highlights
- 2× Consensus All-American (1895, 1896); Second-team All-American (1897)

Norman Winslow Cabot (July 1, 1876 – April 12, 1928) was an American football player.

Cabot was born in 1876 in Brookline, Massachusetts. He was the son of architect Edward Clarke Cabot, a descendant of explorer John Cabot. He attended Hale School in Boston.

He attended Harvard University where he played for the Harvard Crimson football team from 1894 to 1897. He was 5', 11-1/2" and 168 pounds and was called "a remarkably strong tackler and a good ground-gainer." As a sophomore, he was selected as a first-team end on the 1895 All-America college football team. He was also elected captain of the 1897 Harvard football team.

After leaving Harvard, Cabot and his brother formed the real estate firm of Cabot, Cabot & Forbes in Boston. During World War I, he served as an ensign in the United States Naval Reserve Force. He was stationed at the Moutchic air station in France. He later became commanding officer at the Tudy Island Naval Air Station before being reassigned to naval headquarters in Paris and later to the office of naval intelligence in London. He died in 1928 at his home in Brookline.
