= 1897 Holy Cross football team =

American college football season

1897 Holy Cross football
- Conference: Independent
- Record: 4–3–1
- Head coach: Alfred C. N. Petersen (2nd season)
- Captain: E. F. Shanahan
- Home stadium: Worcester College Grounds, Worcester Oval

1897 Eastern college football independents records
	Conf.			Overall
Team	W	L	T	W		L		T
Penn		–		15	–	0	–	0
Princeton		–		10	–	1	–	0
Washington & Jefferson		–		10	–	1	–	0
Yale		–		9	–	0	–	2
Buffalo		–		9	–	1	–	0
Harvard		–		10	–	1	–	1
Army		–		6	–	1	–	1
Vermont		–		3	–	0	–	2
Lafayette		–		9	–	2	–	1
Drexel		–		6	–	2	–	1
Colgate		–		5	–	2	–	1
Dickinson		–		7	–	3	–	2
Swarthmore		–		7	–	3	–	2
Fordham		–		2	–	1	–	1
Cornell		–		5	–	3	–	1
Syracuse		–		5	–	3	–	1
Brown		–		7	–	4	–	0
Carlisle		–		6	–	4	–	0
Boston College		–		4	–	3	–	0
Holy Cross		–		4	–	3	–	1
Wesleyan		–		8	–	7	–	0
Bucknell		–		3	–	3	–	1
NYU		–		3	–	3	–	0
Temple		–		3	–	3	–	0
Trinity (CT)		–		4	–	4	–	1
Tufts		–		6	–	7	–	0
Geneva		–		3	–	4	–	1
Pittsburgh College		–		3	–	5	–	2
Villanova		–		3	–	5	–	1
Penn State		–		3	–	6	–	0
Amherst		–		2	–	6	–	2
Franklin & Marshall		–		2	–	6	–	2
Lehigh		–		3	–	7	–	0
New Hampshire		–		2	–	5	–	0
Rutgers		–		2	–	5	–	0
Western Univ. Penn.		–		1	–	3	–	0

The 1897 Holy Cross football team was an American football team that represented the College of the Holy Cross as an independent in the 1897 college football season.

In its second and final year under head coach Alfred C. N. Petersen, the team compiled a 4–3–1 record. E. F. Shanahan was the team captain.

Holy Cross played its home games at two off-campus fields in Worcester, Massachusetts, the Worcester Oval and the Worcester College Grounds.

== Schedule ==
Date	Opponent	Site	Result	Attendance	Source
September 25	at Massachusetts	Alumni Field; Amherst, MA	W 4–0		
October 2	at Gardner A.C.	Gardner, MA	L 0–6	500	
October 9	at Amherst	Pratt Field; Amherst, MA	T 6–6		
October 16	Worcester Academy	Worcester College Grounds; Worcester, MA	W 18–0		
October 23	Boston College	Worcester College Grounds; Worcester, MA (rivalry)	W 10–4		
October 30	Worcester Tech	Worcester Oval; Worcester, MA	W 6–0		
November 3	at MIT	South End Grounds; Boston, MA	L 6–8		
November 25	at Boston College	South End Grounds; Boston, MA (rivalry)	L 0–12	4,500	
