= 1897 Boston College football team =

American college football season

1897 Boston College football
- Conference: Independent
- Record: 4–3
- Head coach: John Dunlop (1st season)
- Captain: Arthur White
- Home stadium: South End Grounds

1897 Eastern college football independents records
	Conf.			Overall
Team	W	L	T	W		L		T
Penn		–		15	–	0	–	0
Princeton		–		10	–	1	–	0
Washington & Jefferson		–		10	–	1	–	0
Yale		–		9	–	0	–	2
Buffalo		–		9	–	1	–	0
Harvard		–		10	–	1	–	1
Army		–		6	–	1	–	1
Vermont		–		3	–	0	–	2
Lafayette		–		9	–	2	–	1
Drexel		–		6	–	2	–	1
Colgate		–		5	–	2	–	1
Dickinson		–		7	–	3	–	2
Swarthmore		–		7	–	3	–	2
Fordham		–		2	–	1	–	1
Cornell		–		5	–	3	–	1
Syracuse		–		5	–	3	–	1
Brown		–		7	–	4	–	0
Carlisle		–		6	–	4	–	0
Boston College		–		4	–	3	–	0
Holy Cross		–		4	–	3	–	1
Wesleyan		–		8	–	7	–	0
Bucknell		–		3	–	3	–	1
NYU		–		3	–	3	–	0
Temple		–		3	–	3	–	0
Trinity (CT)		–		4	–	4	–	1
Tufts		–		6	–	7	–	0
Geneva		–		3	–	4	–	1
Pittsburgh College		–		3	–	5	–	2
Villanova		–		3	–	5	–	1
Penn State		–		3	–	6	–	0
Amherst		–		2	–	6	–	2
Franklin & Marshall		–		2	–	6	–	2
Lehigh		–		3	–	7	–	0
New Hampshire		–		2	–	5	–	0
Rutgers		–		2	–	5	–	0
Western Univ. Penn.		–		1	–	3	–	0

The 1897 Boston College football team was an American football team that represented Boston College as an independent during the 1897 college football season. Led by first-year head coach John Dunlop, Boston College compiled a record of 4–3.

== Schedule ==
Date	Opponent	Site	Result	Attendance	Source
October 2	at Campello Athletic Club	Brockton Fair Grounds; Brockton, MA	W 14–4		
October 16	at Whitman Athletic Club		W 14–4		
October 23	at Holy Cross	Worcester College Grounds; Worcester, MA (rivalry)	L 4–10		
October 27	at Tufts	Medford, MA	L 4–12		
October 30	Exeter Academy		L 4–10		
November 6	Harvard Law School		W 6–0		
November 25	vs. Holy Cross	South End Grounds; Boston, MA	W 12–0	4,500	
