= 1897 Lehigh football team =

American college football season

1897 Lehigh football
- Conference: Independent
- Record: 3–7
- Head coach: Samuel M. Hammond (1st season)

1897 Eastern college football independents records
| | Conf. | | | Overall |
| Team | W | L | T | W | | L | | T |
|---|---|---|---|---|---|---|---|---|
| Penn | | – | | 15 | – | 0 | – | 0 |
| Princeton | | – | | 10 | – | 1 | – | 0 |
| Washington & Jefferson | | – | | 10 | – | 1 | – | 0 |
| Yale | | – | | 9 | – | 0 | – | 2 |
| Buffalo | | – | | 9 | – | 1 | – | 0 |
| Harvard | | – | | 10 | – | 1 | – | 1 |
| Army | | – | | 6 | – | 1 | – | 1 |
| Vermont | | – | | 3 | – | 0 | – | 2 |
| Lafayette | | – | | 9 | – | 2 | – | 1 |
| Drexel | | – | | 6 | – | 2 | – | 1 |
| Colgate | | – | | 5 | – | 2 | – | 1 |
| Dickinson | | – | | 7 | – | 3 | – | 2 |
| Swarthmore | | – | | 7 | – | 3 | – | 2 |
| Fordham | | – | | 2 | – | 1 | – | 1 |
| Cornell | | – | | 5 | – | 3 | – | 1 |
| Syracuse | | – | | 5 | – | 3 | – | 1 |
| Brown | | – | | 7 | – | 4 | – | 0 |
| Carlisle | | – | | 6 | – | 4 | – | 0 |
| Boston College | | – | | 4 | – | 3 | – | 0 |
| Holy Cross | | – | | 4 | – | 3 | – | 1 |
| Wesleyan | | – | | 8 | – | 7 | – | 0 |
| Bucknell | | – | | 3 | – | 3 | – | 1 |
| NYU | | – | | 3 | – | 3 | – | 0 |
| Temple | | – | | 3 | – | 3 | – | 0 |
| Trinity (CT) | | – | | 4 | – | 4 | – | 1 |
| Tufts | | – | | 6 | – | 7 | – | 0 |
| Geneva | | – | | 3 | – | 4 | – | 1 |
| Pittsburgh College | | – | | 3 | – | 5 | – | 2 |
| Villanova | | – | | 3 | – | 5 | – | 1 |
| Penn State | | – | | 3 | – | 6 | – | 0 |
| Amherst | | – | | 2 | – | 6 | – | 2 |
| Franklin & Marshall | | – | | 2 | – | 6 | – | 2 |
| Lehigh | | – | | 3 | – | 7 | – | 0 |
| New Hampshire | | – | | 2 | – | 5 | – | 0 |
| Rutgers | | – | | 2 | – | 5 | – | 0 |
| Western Univ. Penn. | | – | | 1 | – | 3 | – | 0 |

The 1897 Lehigh football team was an American football team that represented Lehigh University as an independent during the 1897 college football season. In its first and only season under head coach Samuel M. Hammond, the team compiled a 3–7 record and was outscored by a total of 261 to 84.

== Schedule ==
| Date | Time | Opponent | Site | Result | Attendance | Source |
|---|---|---|---|---|---|---|
| October 2 | | at Princeton | University Field; Princeton, NJ | L 0–43 | | |
| October 9 | 3:07 p.m. | at Penn | Franklin Field; Philadelphia, PA | L 0–58 | 4,000 | |
| October 16 | | vs. Williams | Albany, NY | W 5–0 | | |
| October 20 | | Dickinson | Bethlehem, PA | W 5–0 | | |
| October 23 | | vs. Bucknell | Williamsport, PA | L 20–28 | 1,500 | |
| October 30 | | at Lafayette | March Field; Easton, PA (rivalry) | L 0–34 | | |
| November 6 | | at Army | The Plain; West Point, NY | L 6–48 | | |
| November 13 | | NYU | Bethlehem, PA | W 42–0 | | |
| November 20 | | at Navy | Worden Field; Annapolis, MD | L 6–28 | | |
| November 25 | | Lafayette | Bethlehem, PA | L 0–22 | | |
