= 1897 Dickinson Red and White football team =

American college football season

1897 Dickinson Red and White football
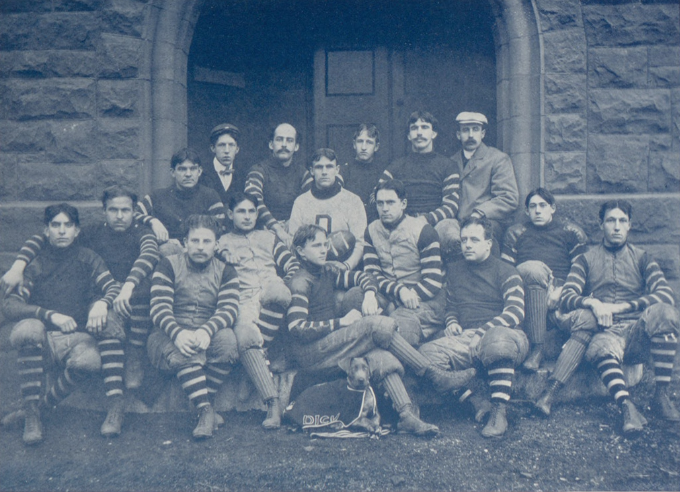
- Conference: Independent
- Record: 7–3–2
- Head coach: Nathan Stauffer (2nd season)

1897 Eastern college football independents records
	Conf.			Overall
Team	W	L	T	W		L		T
Penn		–		15	–	0	–	0
Princeton		–		10	–	1	–	0
Washington & Jefferson		–		10	–	1	–	0
Yale		–		9	–	0	–	2
Buffalo		–		9	–	1	–	0
Harvard		–		10	–	1	–	1
Army		–		6	–	1	–	1
Vermont		–		3	–	0	–	2
Lafayette		–		9	–	2	–	1
Drexel		–		6	–	2	–	1
Colgate		–		5	–	2	–	1
Dickinson		–		7	–	3	–	2
Swarthmore		–		7	–	3	–	2
Fordham		–		2	–	1	–	1
Cornell		–		5	–	3	–	1
Syracuse		–		5	–	3	–	1
Brown		–		7	–	4	–	0
Carlisle		–		6	–	4	–	0
Boston College		–		4	–	3	–	0
Holy Cross		–		4	–	3	–	1
Wesleyan		–		8	–	7	–	0
Bucknell		–		3	–	3	–	1
NYU		–		3	–	3	–	0
Temple		–		3	–	3	–	0
Trinity (CT)		–		4	–	4	–	1
Tufts		–		6	–	7	–	0
Geneva		–		3	–	4	–	1
Pittsburgh College		–		3	–	5	–	2
Villanova		–		3	–	5	–	1
Penn State		–		3	–	6	–	0
Amherst		–		2	–	6	–	2
Franklin & Marshall		–		2	–	6	–	2
Lehigh		–		3	–	7	–	0
New Hampshire		–		2	–	5	–	0
Rutgers		–		2	–	5	–	0
Western Univ. Penn.		–		1	–	3	–	0

The 1897 Dickinson Red and White football team was an American football team that represented Dickinson College as an independent during the 1897 college football season. The team compiled a 7–3–2 record and outscored opponents by a total of 146 to 69. Nathan Stauffer was the team's head coach.

== Schedule ==
Date	Opponent	Site	Result	Attendance	Source
September 8	at Phoenix Athletic Association	Phoenixville, PA	W 2–0		
September 25	Susquehanna	Carlisle, PA	W 18–0		
October 2	Carlisle	Carlisle, PA	L 0–36	600–700	
October 9	at Swarthmore	Swarthmore, PA	W 20–4		
October 16	at Haverford	Haverford, PA	W 6–5		
October 20	at Lehigh	Bethlehem, PA	L 0–5		
October 23	Villanova	Carlisle, PA	W 50–0	500	
November 2	vs. York Y.M.C.A.	Philadelphia, PA	T 0–0		
November 6	Mount St. Mary's	Carlisle, PA	T 0–0		
November 13	at Lafayette	March Field; Easton, PA	L 0–19		
November 20	Franklin & Marshall	Carlisle, PA	W 42–0		
November 25	vs. Penn State	Sunbury, PA	W 6–0		
