= 1897 Penn State football team =

American college football season

1897 Penn State football
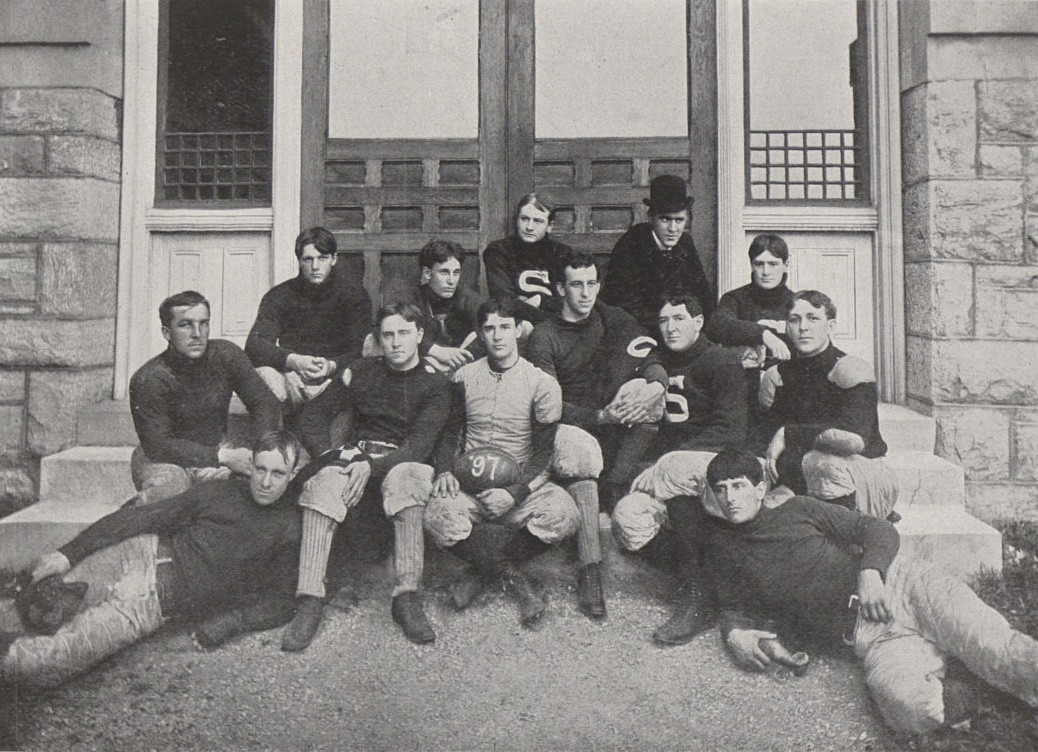
- Conference: Independent
- Record: 3–6
- Head coach: Samuel B. Newton (2nd season)
- Captain: Joe Curtin
- Home stadium: Beaver Field

1897 Eastern college football independents records
| | Conf. | | | Overall |
| Team | W | L | T | W | | L | | T |
|---|---|---|---|---|---|---|---|---|
| Penn | | – | | 15 | – | 0 | – | 0 |
| Princeton | | – | | 10 | – | 1 | – | 0 |
| Washington & Jefferson | | – | | 10 | – | 1 | – | 0 |
| Yale | | – | | 9 | – | 0 | – | 2 |
| Buffalo | | – | | 9 | – | 1 | – | 0 |
| Harvard | | – | | 10 | – | 1 | – | 1 |
| Army | | – | | 6 | – | 1 | – | 1 |
| Vermont | | – | | 3 | – | 0 | – | 2 |
| Lafayette | | – | | 9 | – | 2 | – | 1 |
| Drexel | | – | | 6 | – | 2 | – | 1 |
| Colgate | | – | | 5 | – | 2 | – | 1 |
| Dickinson | | – | | 7 | – | 3 | – | 2 |
| Swarthmore | | – | | 7 | – | 3 | – | 2 |
| Fordham | | – | | 2 | – | 1 | – | 1 |
| Cornell | | – | | 5 | – | 3 | – | 1 |
| Syracuse | | – | | 5 | – | 3 | – | 1 |
| Brown | | – | | 7 | – | 4 | – | 0 |
| Carlisle | | – | | 6 | – | 4 | – | 0 |
| Boston College | | – | | 4 | – | 3 | – | 0 |
| Holy Cross | | – | | 4 | – | 3 | – | 1 |
| Wesleyan | | – | | 8 | – | 7 | – | 0 |
| Bucknell | | – | | 3 | – | 3 | – | 1 |
| NYU | | – | | 3 | – | 3 | – | 0 |
| Temple | | – | | 3 | – | 3 | – | 0 |
| Trinity (CT) | | – | | 4 | – | 4 | – | 1 |
| Tufts | | – | | 6 | – | 7 | – | 0 |
| Geneva | | – | | 3 | – | 4 | – | 1 |
| Pittsburgh College | | – | | 3 | – | 5 | – | 2 |
| Villanova | | – | | 3 | – | 5 | – | 1 |
| Penn State | | – | | 3 | – | 6 | – | 0 |
| Franklin & Marshall | | – | | 2 | – | 6 | – | 2 |
| Lehigh | | – | | 3 | – | 7 | – | 0 |
| New Hampshire | | – | | 2 | – | 5 | – | 0 |
| Rutgers | | – | | 2 | – | 5 | – | 0 |
| Western Univ. Penn. | | – | | 1 | – | 3 | – | 0 |

The 1897 Penn State football team was an American football team that represented Pennsylvania State College—now known as Pennsylvania State University–as an independent during the 1897 college football season. The team was coached by Samuel B. Newton and played its home games on Beaver Field in University Park, Pennsylvania.

== Schedule ==
| Date | Time | Opponent | Site | Result | Attendance | Source |
|---|---|---|---|---|---|---|
| September 25 | | Gettysburg | Beaver Field; State College, PA | W 32–0 | | |
| October 2 | | at Lafayette | March Field; Easton, PA | L 0–24 | | |
| October 13 | | at Princeton | University Field; Princeton, NJ | L 0–34 | | |
| October 16 | | at Penn | Franklin Field; Philadelphia, PA | L 0–24 | 500 | |
| October 20 | | at Navy | Worden Field; Annapolis, MD | L 0–4 | | |
| October 30 | | at Cornell | Percy Field; Ithaca, NY | L 0–45 | | |
| November 13 | 2:40 p.m. | vs. Bucknell | Athletic Park; Williamsport, PA | W 27–4 | 1,800 | |
| November 20 | | Bloomsburg Normal | Beaver Field; State College, PA | W 10–0 | | |
| November 25 | | vs. Dickinson | Sunbury, PA | L 0–6 | | |
