= 1897 New Hampshire football team =

American college football season

1897 New Hampshire football
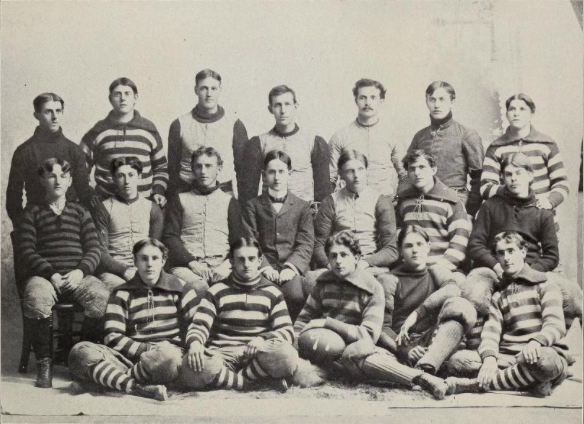
- Team captain Hayes at front center, holding football
- Conference: Independent
- Record: 2–5
- Head coach: None
- Captain: Fred F. Hayes
- Home stadium: College grounds, Durham, NH; Central Park, Dover, NH

1897 Eastern college football independents records
	Conf.			Overall
Team	W	L	T	W		L		T
Penn		–		15	–	0	–	0
Princeton		–		10	–	1	–	0
Washington & Jefferson		–		10	–	1	–	0
Yale		–		9	–	0	–	2
Buffalo		–		9	–	1	–	0
Harvard		–		10	–	1	–	1
Army		–		6	–	1	–	1
Vermont		–		3	–	0	–	2
Lafayette		–		9	–	2	–	1
Drexel		–		6	–	2	–	1
Colgate		–		5	–	2	–	1
Dickinson		–		7	–	3	–	2
Swarthmore		–		7	–	3	–	2
Fordham		–		2	–	1	–	1
Cornell		–		5	–	3	–	1
Syracuse		–		5	–	3	–	1
Brown		–		7	–	4	–	0
Carlisle		–		6	–	4	–	0
Boston College		–		4	–	3	–	0
Holy Cross		–		4	–	3	–	1
Wesleyan		–		8	–	7	–	0
Bucknell		–		3	–	3	–	1
NYU		–		3	–	3	–	0
Temple		–		3	–	3	–	0
Trinity (CT)		–		4	–	4	–	1
Tufts		–		6	–	7	–	0
Geneva		–		3	–	4	–	1
Pittsburgh College		–		3	–	5	–	2
Villanova		–		3	–	5	–	1
Penn State		–		3	–	6	–	0
Amherst		–		2	–	6	–	2
Franklin & Marshall		–		2	–	6	–	2
Lehigh		–		3	–	7	–	0
New Hampshire		–		2	–	5	–	0
Rutgers		–		2	–	5	–	0
Western Univ. Penn.		–		1	–	3	–	0

The 1897 New Hampshire football team (Note: The school did not adopt the Wildcats nickname until February 1926; before then, they were generally referred to as "the blue and white".) was an American football team that represented New Hampshire College of Agriculture and the Mechanic Arts (Note: The school was often referred to as New Hampshire College or New Hampshire State College in newspapers of the era.) during the 1897 college football season—the school became the University of New Hampshire in 1923. The team played a seven-game schedule and finished with a record of 2–5.

== Schedule ==
Scoring during this era awarded four points for a touchdown, two points for a conversion kick (extra point), and five points for a field goal. Teams played in the one-platoon system and the forward pass was not yet legal. Games were played in two halves rather than four quarters.

Date	Opponent	Site	Result	Source
September 29	at Exeter Academy	Exeter, NH	L 0–26	
October 2	at Massachusetts	Amherst, MA (rivalry)	L 4–10	
October 9	Tilton Seminary	Durham, NH	W 22–0	
October 16	Dover High School	Durham, NH	W 34–0	
October 27 (Note: Game date per contemporary news report in The Boston Globe; other sources place this game on October 28.)	Bowdoin	Durham, NH	L 0–64	
October 30	Tufts	Central Park; Dover, NH	L 4–12	
November 3 (Note: Game date per contemporary news report in The Boston Globe; other sources place this game on November 11.)	at Dover YMCA	Central Park; Dover, NH	L 0–6	

The team's original schedule included games against Holy Cross, Maine, and Boston College. New Hampshire would not play these teams until 1909, 1903, and 1899, respectively.

The October 2 game in Amherst was the first meeting in the New Hampshire–Massachusetts football rivalry.

The final game of the season was awarded to Dover by a score of 6–0, as the New Hampshire team left the field due to rough play. The score on the field had been 6–0 in favor of New Hampshire at the time the game was abandoned.

== Roster ==
Name	Position	Team photo location
Harry E. Barnard	right tackle	seated, third from left
Richard C. Butterfield	left guard	standing, third from right
Henry H. Calderwood	fullback	on floor, second from right
Guy M. Cleaveland	right halfback	on floor, leftmost
G. S. Demerritt	student manager	seated, center (in suit)
Dimick	right guard	standing, third from left
Harry G. Farwell	right end	seated, rightmost
Arthur Given	center	standing, center
Fred H. Grover	left guard (sub.)	seated, third from right
Hancock	right end	standing, leftmost
Fred F. Hayes (captain)	right halfback	on floor, center (with football)
J. Norton Hunt	left end	standing, rightmost
Rutherford B. Lewis	quarterback	on floor, second from left
Harry C. Mathes	left tackle	seated, second from right
Fred D. Sanborn	right guard	standing, second from left
Twombly	left halfback (sub.)	seated, second from left
John E. Wilson	left halfback	on floor, rightmost
Robert M. Wright	left tackle	standing, second from right
York	left end (sub.)	seated, leftmost
