= 1897 Swarthmore Quakers football team =

American college football season

1897 Swarthmore Quakers football
- Conference: Independent
- Record: 7–3–2
- Head coach: Jacob K. Shell (10th season)
- Home stadium: Whittier Field

1897 Eastern college football independents records
	Conf.			Overall
Team	W	L	T	W		L		T
Penn		–		15	–	0	–	0
Princeton		–		10	–	1	–	0
Washington & Jefferson		–		10	–	1	–	0
Yale		–		9	–	0	–	2
Buffalo		–		9	–	1	–	0
Harvard		–		10	–	1	–	1
Army		–		6	–	1	–	1
Vermont		–		3	–	0	–	2
Lafayette		–		9	–	2	–	1
Drexel		–		6	–	2	–	1
Colgate		–		5	–	2	–	1
Dickinson		–		7	–	3	–	2
Swarthmore		–		7	–	3	–	2
Fordham		–		2	–	1	–	1
Cornell		–		5	–	3	–	1
Syracuse		–		5	–	3	–	1
Brown		–		7	–	4	–	0
Carlisle		–		6	–	4	–	0
Boston College		–		4	–	3	–	0
Holy Cross		–		4	–	3	–	1
Wesleyan		–		8	–	7	–	0
Bucknell		–		3	–	3	–	1
NYU		–		3	–	3	–	0
Temple		–		3	–	3	–	0
Trinity (CT)		–		4	–	4	–	1
Tufts		–		6	–	7	–	0
Geneva		–		3	–	4	–	1
Pittsburgh College		–		3	–	5	–	2
Villanova		–		3	–	5	–	1
Penn State		–		3	–	6	–	0
Amherst		–		2	–	6	–	2
Franklin & Marshall		–		2	–	6	–	2
Lehigh		–		3	–	7	–	0
New Hampshire		–		2	–	5	–	0
Rutgers		–		2	–	5	–	0
Western Univ. Penn.		–		1	–	3	–	0

The 1897 Swarthmore Quakers football team was an American football team that represented Swarthmore College as an independent during the 1897 college football season. The team compiled a 7–3–2 record and outscored opponents by a total of 114 to 60. Jacob K. Shell was the head coach.

== Schedule ==
Date	Opponent	Site	Result	Attendance	Source
October 2	Swarthmore alumni	Whittier Field; Swarthmore, PA	W 12–0		
October 6	at Delaware	Newark, DE	W 12–6		
October 9	Dickinson	Whittier Field; Swarthmore, PA	L 4–20		
October 13	Media Academy	Whittier Field; Swarthmore, PA	W 14–0		
October 16	at Rutgers	New Brunswick, NJ	W 8–6		
October 23	Ursinus	Swarthmore, PA	W 12–0		
October 27	vs. Johns Hopkins	Lansdowne, PA	W 16–0		
October 30	at Ursinus	Collegeville, PA	L 0–4		
November 3	at Pennsylvania Military	Chester, PA	T 6–6		
November 6	St. John's (MD)	Whittier Field; Swarthmore, PA	W 18–4		
November 13	at Haverford	Haverford, PA (rivalry)	L 6–8	2,000	
November 25	at Franklin & Marshall	Lancaster, PA	W 6–0		
