= James O. Rodgers (American football) =

American football player and coach (1874–1945)

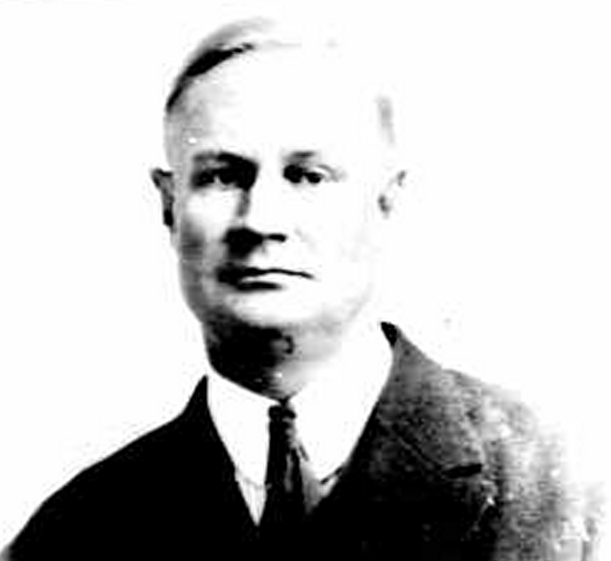
- Rodgers, 1915

Biographical details
- Born: October 11, 1874; Toledo, Ohio, U.S.
- Died: May 17, 1945 (aged 70); Pelham Manor, New York, U.S.

Playing career
- 1894–1897: Yale
- Position: Tackle

Coaching career (HC unless noted)
- 1899: Yale

Head coaching record
- Overall: 7–2–1

Accomplishments and honors

Awards
- First-team All-American (1897); Second-team All-American (1896)

James Otis Rodgers (October 11, 1874 – May 17, 1945) was an American football player and coach. Rodgers played college football for Yale University from 1894 to 1897 and was captain of Yale's 1897 football team. He also served as the head coach of the 1899 Yale football team. He later had a lengthy career as an insurance broker.

== Early years ==
Rodgers was born in Toledo, Ohio in 1874. He was the son of James Scott Rodgers and Mary L. (Parker) Rodgers. His father was a manufacturer of boots and shoes in Toledo. Rodgers attended preparatory school at the Andover Academy where he competed for the school's football and track teams.

== Yale ==
Rodgers enrolled at Yale University where he played at the left tackle position for the Yale Bulldogs football team from 1894 to 1897. He was elected by his teammates as the captain of Yale's 1897 football team. During his four years as a player, the Yale football team compiled an overall record of 51–1–4, and has been recognized as national champions in three of the four years.

Rodgers also rowed for Yale's varsity crew in 1896 and competed with Yale's crew in England as part of the Henley regatta of 1896. He received a Bachelor of Arts degree from Yale in 1898 and was voted in his senior year as "the man who has done the most for Yale."

After graduating from Yale, Rodgers enrolled at Harvard Law School. Rodgers returned to Yale as the head football coach in the fall of 1899. Due to the demands of his legal studies, Rodgers was unable to spend all of his time with the football team and was assisted by Walter Camp. Rodgers coached the 1899 Yale football team to a 7–2–1 record, outscoring opponents 191 to 16. Rodgers also served as the crew coach at Yale, and also coached rowing at the New York Athletic Club.

During the period from 1899 to 1912, Yale had 14 different head football coaches in 14 years – despite compiling a combined record of 127–11–10 in those years. During that 14-year span, the Yale football team has also been recognized as the national championship team by one or more of the major national championship selectors on seven occasions – 1900 (Billingsley, Helms, Houlgate, National Championship Foundation, Parke Davis), 1901 (Parke Davis), 1902 (Parke Davis), 1905 (Parke Davis, Whitney), 1906 (Billingsley, Parke Davis, Whitney), 1907 (Billingsley, Helms, Houlgate, National Championship Foundation, Parke Davis, Whitney), and 1909 (Billingsley, Helms, Houlgate, National Championship Foundation, Parke Davis).

== Later years ==
Rodgers left Harvard Law School after two years to accept a position as vice president and general manager of the Lanyon Zinc Company of Iola, Kansas. He later became president of that company. Rodgers returned to New York in 1917 and spent the remainder of his career working as an insurance broker.

Rodgers was married to Cara Worthington Hale in April 1902 at Cleveland, Ohio. They had a son, James O. Rodgers, Jr. Rodgers died of a heart attack in May 1945 at the New Rochelle Hospital in New Rochelle, New York.

== Head coaching record ==
| Year | Team | Overall | Conference | Standing | Bowl/playoffs |
|---|---|---|---|---|---|
Yale Bulldogs (Independent) (1899)
| 1899 | Yale | 7–2–1 | | | |
| Yale: | | 7–2–1 | | | |
| Total: | | 7–2–1 | | | |
