= 1897 Trinity Bantams football team =

American college football season

1897 Trinity Bantams football
- Conference: Independent
- Record: 4–4–1
- Head coach: Everett J. Lake (1st season)
- Captain: A. S. Woodle
- Home stadium: Trinity athletic field

1897 Eastern college football independents records
	Conf.			Overall
Team	W	L	T	W		L		T
Penn		–		15	–	0	–	0
Princeton		–		10	–	1	–	0
Washington & Jefferson		–		10	–	1	–	0
Yale		–		9	–	0	–	2
Buffalo		–		9	–	1	–	0
Harvard		–		10	–	1	–	1
Army		–		6	–	1	–	1
Vermont		–		3	–	0	–	2
Lafayette		–		9	–	2	–	1
Drexel		–		6	–	2	–	1
Colgate		–		5	–	2	–	1
Dickinson		–		7	–	3	–	2
Swarthmore		–		7	–	3	–	2
Fordham		–		2	–	1	–	1
Cornell		–		5	–	3	–	1
Syracuse		–		5	–	3	–	1
Brown		–		7	–	4	–	0
Carlisle		–		6	–	4	–	0
Boston College		–		4	–	3	–	0
Holy Cross		–		4	–	3	–	1
Wesleyan		–		8	–	7	–	0
Bucknell		–		3	–	3	–	1
NYU		–		3	–	3	–	0
Temple		–		3	–	3	–	0
Trinity (CT)		–		4	–	4	–	1
Tufts		–		6	–	7	–	0
Geneva		–		3	–	4	–	1
Pittsburgh College		–		3	–	5	–	2
Villanova		–		3	–	5	–	1
Penn State		–		3	–	6	–	0
Amherst		–		2	–	6	–	2
Franklin & Marshall		–		2	–	6	–	2
Lehigh		–		3	–	7	–	0
New Hampshire		–		2	–	5	–	0
Rutgers		–		2	–	5	–	0
Western Univ. Penn.		–		1	–	3	–	0

The 1897 Trinity Bantams football team represented the Trinity College during the 1897 college football season. The team was led by first-year head coach Everett J. Lake. A. S. Woodle was captain.

== Schedule ==
Date	Time	Opponent	Site	Result	Attendance	Source
September 29		Yale	Trinity athletic field; Hartford, CT	L 10–0	800	
October 2		at Army	The Plain; West Point, NY	L 6–38		
October 9		Massachusetts	Hartford, CT	W 26–5		
October 16		Hamilton	Hartford, CT	W 16–0		
October 24		at NYU	Ohio Field; Bronx, NY	W 34–0		
October 30		at Amherst	Trinity athletic field; Amherst, MA	W 18–0		
November 6	3:00 p.m.	Wesleyan	Hartford, CT (rivalry)	L 4–6	2,000	
November 17		at Waterbury YMCA	Waterbury, CT	L 0–8		
November 20		at Tufts	Tufts Oval; Medford, MA	L 10–18		
