= 1897 Geneva Covenanters football team =

American college football season

1897 Geneva Covenanters football
- Conference: Independent
- Record: 3–4–1
- Head coach: Ross Fiscus (1st season)
- Captain: W. J. Engle

1897 Eastern college football independents records
	Conf.			Overall
Team	W	L	T	W		L		T
Penn		–		15	–	0	–	0
Princeton		–		10	–	1	–	0
Washington & Jefferson		–		10	–	1	–	0
Yale		–		9	–	0	–	2
Buffalo		–		9	–	1	–	0
Harvard		–		10	–	1	–	1
Army		–		6	–	1	–	1
Vermont		–		3	–	0	–	2
Lafayette		–		9	–	2	–	1
Drexel		–		6	–	2	–	1
Colgate		–		5	–	2	–	1
Dickinson		–		7	–	3	–	2
Swarthmore		–		7	–	3	–	2
Fordham		–		2	–	1	–	1
Cornell		–		5	–	3	–	1
Syracuse		–		5	–	3	–	1
Brown		–		7	–	4	–	0
Carlisle		–		6	–	4	–	0
Boston College		–		4	–	3	–	0
Holy Cross		–		4	–	3	–	1
Wesleyan		–		8	–	7	–	0
Bucknell		–		3	–	3	–	1
NYU		–		3	–	3	–	0
Temple		–		3	–	3	–	0
Trinity (CT)		–		4	–	4	–	1
Tufts		–		6	–	7	–	0
Geneva		–		3	–	4	–	1
Pittsburgh College		–		3	–	5	–	2
Villanova		–		3	–	5	–	1
Penn State		–		3	–	6	–	0
Amherst		–		2	–	6	–	2
Franklin & Marshall		–		2	–	6	–	2
Lehigh		–		3	–	7	–	0
New Hampshire		–		2	–	5	–	0
Rutgers		–		2	–	5	–	0
Western Univ. Penn.		–		1	–	3	–	0

The 1897 Geneva Covenanters football team was an American football team that represented Geneva College as an independent during the 1897 college football season. Led by first-year head coach Ross Fiscus, Geneva compiled a record of 3–4–1. The team's captain was W. J. Engle.

== Schedule ==
Date	Time	Opponent	Site	Result	Attendance	Source
September 25		Wellsville Athletic Club	Beaver Falls, PA	W 42–0		
October 2		at Washington & Jefferson	Washington, PA	L 0–12	850	
October 9	3:45 p.m.	at Duquesne Country and Athletic Club	Exposition Park; Allegheny, PA	L 0–20	1,000	
October 16	12:00 p.m.	at Greensburg Athletic Association	Greensburg, PA	L 0–32		
October 23		Pittsburgh College	Beaver Falls, PA	W 26–5		
October 30		at Grove City	Grove City, PA	L 0–6		
November 6		Westminster (PA)	Beaver Falls, PA	W 14–0		
November 13		Grove City	Beaver Falls, PA	T 0–0		
All times are in Eastern time
