= 1897 Buffalo football team =

American college football season

1897 Buffalo football
- Conference: Independent
- Record: 9–1
- Head coach: C. W. Dibble (1st season)
- Captain: William J. Bott
- Home stadium: Buffalo Athletic Field

1897 Eastern college football independents records
	Conf.			Overall
Team	W	L	T	W		L		T
Penn		–		15	–	0	–	0
Princeton		–		10	–	1	–	0
Washington & Jefferson		–		10	–	1	–	0
Yale		–		9	–	0	–	2
Buffalo		–		9	–	1	–	0
Harvard		–		10	–	1	–	1
Army		–		6	–	1	–	1
Vermont		–		3	–	0	–	2
Lafayette		–		9	–	2	–	1
Drexel		–		6	–	2	–	1
Colgate		–		5	–	2	–	1
Dickinson		–		7	–	3	–	2
Swarthmore		–		7	–	3	–	2
Fordham		–		2	–	1	–	1
Cornell		–		5	–	3	–	1
Syracuse		–		5	–	3	–	1
Brown		–		7	–	4	–	0
Carlisle		–		6	–	4	–	0
Boston College		–		4	–	3	–	0
Holy Cross		–		4	–	3	–	1
Wesleyan		–		8	–	7	–	0
Bucknell		–		3	–	3	–	1
NYU		–		3	–	3	–	0
Temple		–		3	–	3	–	0
Trinity (CT)		–		4	–	4	–	1
Tufts		–		6	–	7	–	0
Geneva		–		3	–	4	–	1
Pittsburgh College		–		3	–	5	–	2
Villanova		–		3	–	5	–	1
Penn State		–		3	–	6	–	0
Amherst		–		2	–	6	–	2
Franklin & Marshall		–		2	–	6	–	2
Lehigh		–		3	–	7	–	0
New Hampshire		–		2	–	5	–	0
Rutgers		–		2	–	5	–	0
Western Univ. Penn.		–		1	–	3	–	0

The 1897 Buffalo football team represented the University of Buffalo as an independent during the 1897 college football season. Led by C. W. Dibble in his first and only season as head coach, the team compiled a record of 9–1. Buffalo beat the Syracuse Orangemen twice during the season.

== Schedule ==
Date	Time	Opponent	Site	Result	Attendance	Source
October 2	3:30 p.m.	All-Buffalo	Buffalo Athletic Field; Buffalo, NY	W 18–0	1,000	
October 9	3:25 p.m.	Hamilton	Buffalo Athletic Field; Buffalo, NY	W 16–6		
October 16	3:45 p.m.	at Niagara	Niagara Falls, NY	W 32–0		
October 20		Union (NY)	Buffalo Athletic Field; Buffalo, NY	W 26–0		
October 23	3:45 p.m.	Western Reserve	Buffalo Athletic Field; Buffalo, NY	W 16–4		
November 2	3:30 p.m.	All-Buffalo	Olympic Park; Buffalo, NY	L 0–6		
November 6	3:30 p.m.	Syracuse	Buffalo Athletic Field; Buffalo, NY	W 16–0	800	
November 13	3:00 p.m.	at Syracuse	Varsity Oval; Syracuse, NY	W 10–0	400	
November 20	3:30 p.m.	Oberlin	Buffalo Athletic Field; Buffalo, NY	Cancelled		
November 23	3:00 p.m.	All-Buffalo	Buffalo Athletic Field; Buffalo, NY	W 26–0	800	
November 25	3:00 p.m.	Hobart	Buffalo Athletic Field; Buffalo, NY	W 28–0	700	
