= 1897 Princeton Tigers football team =

American college football season

1897 Princeton Tigers football
- Conference: Independent
- Record: 10–1
- Head coach: None
- Captain: Garrett Cochran

1897 Eastern college football independents records
	Conf.			Overall
Team	W	L	T	W		L		T
Penn		–		15	–	0	–	0
Princeton		–		10	–	1	–	0
Washington & Jefferson		–		10	–	1	–	0
Yale		–		9	–	0	–	2
Buffalo		–		9	–	1	–	0
Harvard		–		10	–	1	–	1
Army		–		6	–	1	–	1
Vermont		–		3	–	0	–	2
Lafayette		–		9	–	2	–	1
Drexel		–		6	–	2	–	1
Colgate		–		5	–	2	–	1
Dickinson		–		7	–	3	–	2
Swarthmore		–		7	–	3	–	2
Fordham		–		2	–	1	–	1
Cornell		–		5	–	3	–	1
Syracuse		–		5	–	3	–	1
Brown		–		7	–	4	–	0
Carlisle		–		6	–	4	–	0
Boston College		–		4	–	3	–	0
Holy Cross		–		4	–	3	–	1
Wesleyan		–		8	–	7	–	0
Bucknell		–		3	–	3	–	1
NYU		–		3	–	3	–	0
Temple		–		3	–	3	–	0
Trinity (CT)		–		4	–	4	–	1
Tufts		–		6	–	7	–	0
Geneva		–		3	–	4	–	1
Pittsburgh College		–		3	–	5	–	2
Villanova		–		3	–	5	–	1
Penn State		–		3	–	6	–	0
Franklin & Marshall		–		2	–	6	–	2
Lehigh		–		3	–	7	–	0
New Hampshire		–		2	–	5	–	0
Rutgers		–		2	–	5	–	0
Western Univ. Penn.		–		1	–	3	–	0

The 1897 Princeton Tigers football team represented Princeton University in the 1897 college football season. The team finished with a 10–1 record. The Tigers won their first ten games by a combined score of 339 to 0, but then lost the last game of the season by a 6–0 score against Yale. Two Princeton players, halfback Addison Kelly and end Garrett Cochran, were consensus first-team honorees on the 1897 College Football All-America Team.

== Schedule ==
Date	Time	Opponent	Site	Result	Attendance	Source
October 2		Lehigh	University Field; Princeton, NJ	W 43–0		
October 6		Rutgers	University Field; Princeton, NJ (rivalry)	W 53–0		
October 9		at Navy	Worden Field; Annapolis, MD	W 28–0	3,000	
October 13		Penn State	University Field; Princeton, NJ	W 34–0		
October 16		Carlisle	University Field; Princeton, NJ	W 18–0	8,000	
October 20		Franklin & Marshall	University Field; Princeton, NJ	W 54–0		
October 23		at Cornell	Percy Field; Ithaca, NY	W 10–0	7,000	
October 27		Elizabeth A.C.	University Field; Princeton, NJ	W 12–0		
October 30	3:10 p.m.	Dartmouth	University Field; Princeton, NJ	W 30–0	2,000	
November 6		Lafayette	University Field; Princeton, NJ	W 57–0	4,500	
November 20		at Yale	Yale Field; New Haven, CT (rivalry)	L 0–6	18,000	

== Roster ==
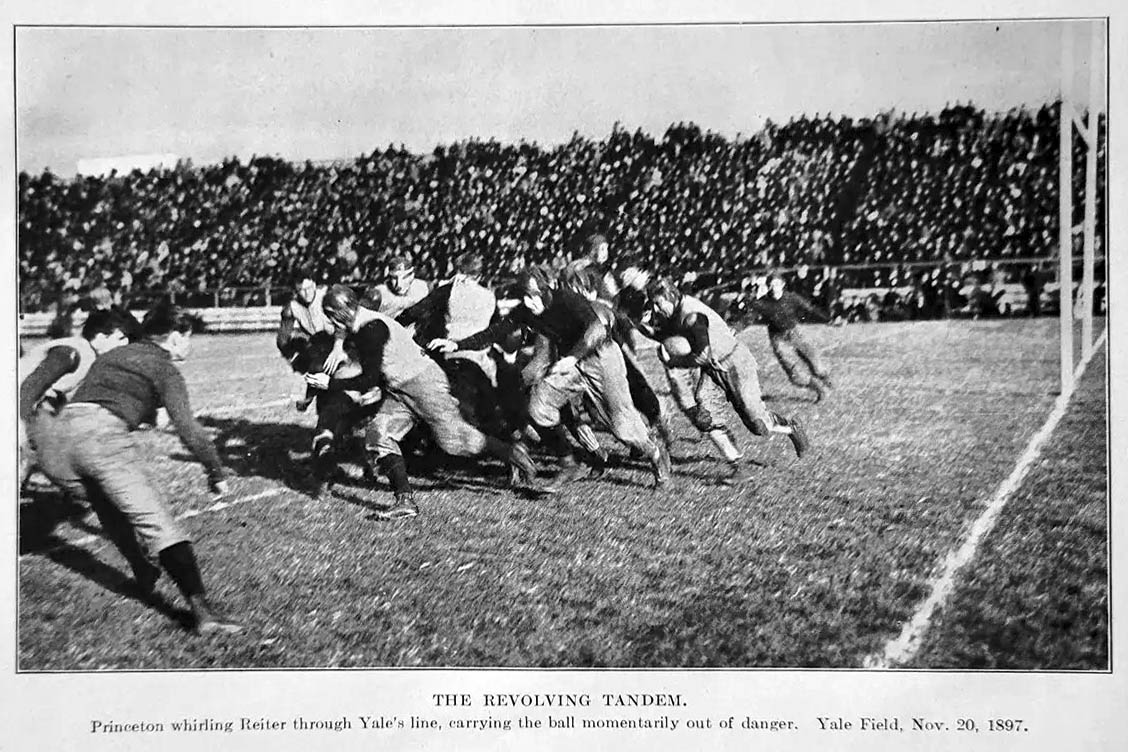
Princeton v Yale game

- Armstrong, G
- Ayers, FB
- John Baird, QB
- W. H. Bannard, HB
- Walter C. Booth, C
- Garrett Cochran, E
- Samuel G. Craig, E
- James L. Crane, HB
- Edward Crowdis, G
- Dickey, G
- Big Bill Edwards, G
- Geer, T
- Art Hillebrand, T
- Edgar Holt, T
- Addison Kelly, HB
- G. Lathrop
- H. Lathrop, E
- Oglesby, E
- Lew Palmer, QB
- Potter, G
- Reid, HB
- Howard R. Reiter, HB
- Rosengarten, QB
- Billy Suter, HB
- Schwartz, E
- Wheeler, FB
