= 1897 Cornell Big Red football team =

American college football season

1897 Cornell Big Red football
- Conference: Independent
- Record: 5–3–1
- Head coach: Pop Warner (1st season)
- Captain: William McKeever
- Home stadium: Percy Field

1897 Eastern college football independents records
	Conf.			Overall
Team	W	L	T	W		L		T
Penn		–		15	–	0	–	0
Princeton		–		10	–	1	–	0
Washington & Jefferson		–		10	–	1	–	0
Yale		–		9	–	0	–	2
Buffalo		–		9	–	1	–	0
Harvard		–		10	–	1	–	1
Army		–		6	–	1	–	1
Vermont		–		3	–	0	–	2
Lafayette		–		9	–	2	–	1
Drexel		–		6	–	2	–	1
Colgate		–		5	–	2	–	1
Dickinson		–		7	–	3	–	2
Swarthmore		–		7	–	3	–	2
Fordham		–		2	–	1	–	1
Cornell		–		5	–	3	–	1
Syracuse		–		5	–	3	–	1
Brown		–		7	–	4	–	0
Carlisle		–		6	–	4	–	0
Boston College		–		4	–	3	–	0
Holy Cross		–		4	–	3	–	1
Wesleyan		–		8	–	7	–	0
Bucknell		–		3	–	3	–	1
NYU		–		3	–	3	–	0
Temple		–		3	–	3	–	0
Trinity (CT)		–		4	–	4	–	1
Tufts		–		6	–	7	–	0
Geneva		–		3	–	4	–	1
Pittsburgh College		–		3	–	5	–	2
Villanova		–		3	–	5	–	1
Penn State		–		3	–	6	–	0
Amherst		–		2	–	6	–	2
Franklin & Marshall		–		2	–	6	–	2
Lehigh		–		3	–	7	–	0
New Hampshire		–		2	–	5	–	0
Rutgers		–		2	–	5	–	0
Western Univ. Penn.		–		1	–	3	–	0

The 1897 Cornell Big Red football team was an American football team that represented Cornell University during the 1897 college football season. In their first season under head coach Pop Warner, the Big Red compiled a 5–3–1 record and outscored all opponents by a combined total of 133 to 42. Three Cornell players received honors on the 1897 College Football All-America Team: quarterback George Young, Cornell (Walter Camp-2, Outing-1); end William McKeever (Camp-2); and end Lyndon S. Tracy, Cornell (Camp-3).

== Schedule ==
Date	Time	Opponent	Site	Result	Attendance	Source
September 25		Colgate	Percy Field; Ithaca, NY (rivalry)	W 6–0		
October 3		Syracuse	Percy Field; Ithaca, NY	W 16–0		
October 9		Tufts	Percy Field; Ithaca, NY	W 15–0		
October 16		at Lafayette	March Field; Easton, PA	T 4–4		
October 23		Princeton	Percy Field; Ithaca, NY	L 0–10	7,000	
October 27		at Harvard	Soldiers' Field; Cambridge, MA	L 5–24	6,000	
October 30		Penn State	Percy Field; Ithaca, NY	W 45–0		
November 13	2:30 p.m.	vs. Williams	Olympic Park; Buffalo, NY	W 42–0	3,000–5,000	
November 25		at Penn	Franklin Field; Philadelphia, PA (rivalry)	L 0–4	20,000	
