= 1897 Yale Bulldogs football team =

American college football season

1897 Yale Bulldogs football
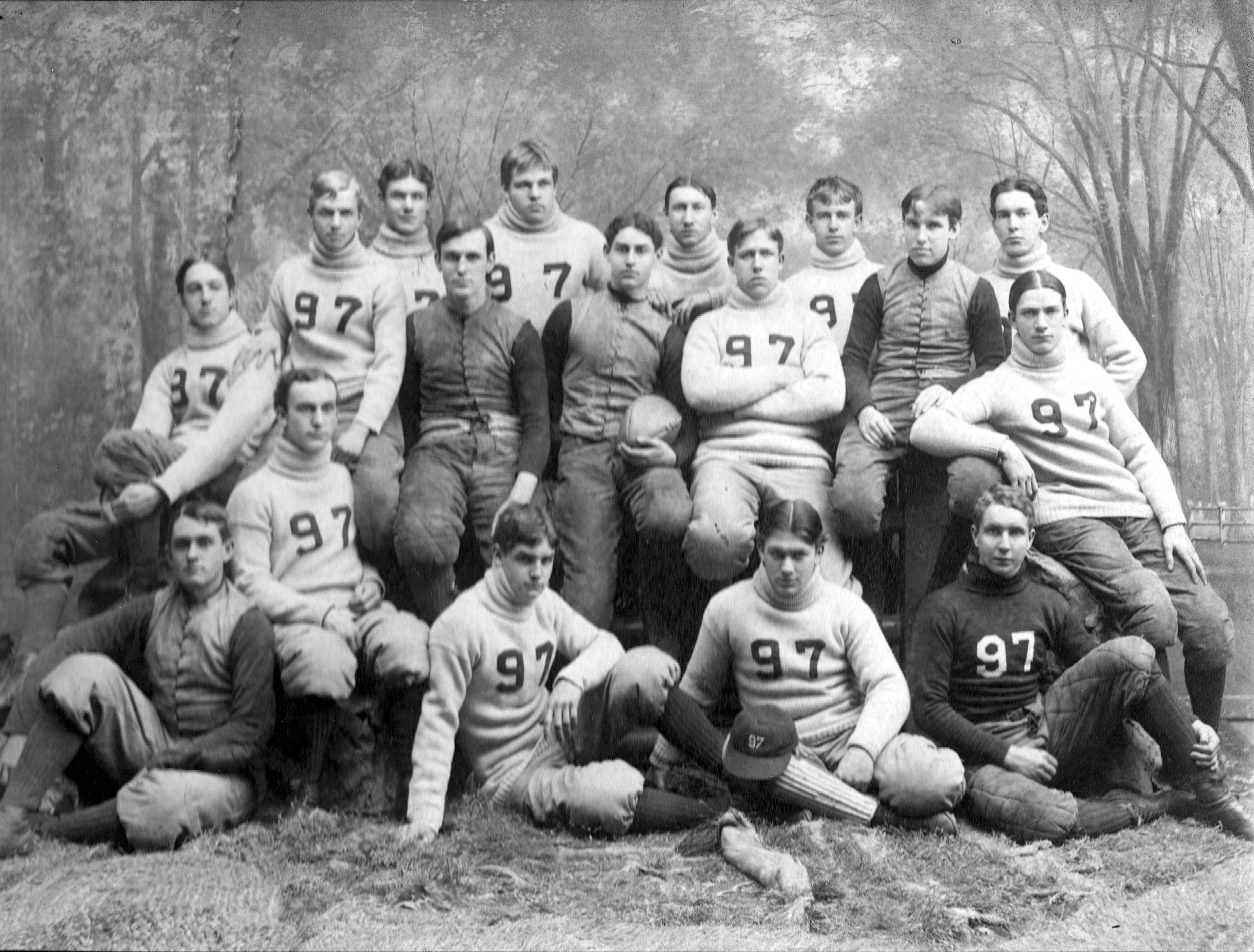

Co-national champion (The Sun, Davis)
- Conference: Independent
- Record: 9–0–2
- Head coach: Frank Butterworth (1st season)
- Captain: James O. Rodgers
- Home stadium: Yale Field

1897 Eastern college football independents records
	Conf.			Overall
Team	W	L	T	W		L		T
Penn		–		15	–	0	–	0
Princeton		–		10	–	1	–	0
Washington & Jefferson		–		10	–	1	–	0
Yale		–		9	–	0	–	2
Buffalo		–		9	–	1	–	0
Harvard		–		10	–	1	–	1
Army		–		6	–	1	–	1
Vermont		–		3	–	0	–	2
Lafayette		–		9	–	2	–	1
Drexel		–		6	–	2	–	1
Colgate		–		5	–	2	–	1
Dickinson		–		7	–	3	–	2
Swarthmore		–		7	–	3	–	2
Fordham		–		2	–	1	–	1
Cornell		–		5	–	3	–	1
Syracuse		–		5	–	3	–	1
Brown		–		7	–	4	–	0
Carlisle		–		6	–	4	–	0
Boston College		–		4	–	3	–	0
Holy Cross		–		4	–	3	–	1
Wesleyan		–		8	–	7	–	0
Bucknell		–		3	–	3	–	1
NYU		–		3	–	3	–	0
Temple		–		3	–	3	–	0
Trinity (CT)		–		4	–	4	–	1
Tufts		–		6	–	7	–	0
Geneva		–		3	–	4	–	1
Pittsburgh College		–		3	–	5	–	2
Villanova		–		3	–	5	–	1
Penn State		–		3	–	6	–	0
Franklin & Marshall		–		2	–	6	–	2
Lehigh		–		3	–	7	–	0
New Hampshire		–		2	–	5	–	0
Rutgers		–		2	–	5	–	0
Western Univ. Penn.		–		1	–	3	–	0

The 1897 Yale Bulldogs football team was an American football team that represented Yale University as an independent during the 1897 college football season. The team finished with a 9–0–2 record, shut out seven of eleven opponents, and outscored all opponents by a total of 170 to 35. Frank Butterworth was the head coach.

New York newspaper The Sun ranked Pennsylvania and Yale tied for first in the nation in November 1897. The teams were named as co-national champions in a list published by Parke H. Davis in 1934. Other later selectors designated 15–0 Pennsylvania alone as the national champion for 1897; Yale and Penn did not play during the 1897 season.

Four Yale players were selected as consensus first-team players on the 1897 All-America team. The team's consensus All-Americans were: quarterback Charles de Saulles; end John A. Hall; guard Gordon Brown; and tackle Burr Chamberlain. Other notable players included halfback Charles T. Dudley, fullback Malcolm McBride, center George Cadwalader, guard Charles Chadwick, and tackle James O. Rodgers.

== Schedule ==
Date	Opponent	Site	Result	Attendance	Source
September 29	at Trinity (CT)	Trinity athletic field; Hartford, CT	W 10–0	800	
October 2	Wesleyan	Yale Field; New Haven, CT	W 30–0	2,000–3,000	
October 6	Amherst	Yale Field; New Haven, CT	W 18–0	900	
October 9	Williams	Yale Field; New Haven, CT	W 32–0		
October 16	at Newton Athletic Association	Newton, MA	W 10–0		
October 20	Brown	Yale Field; New Haven, CT	W 18–14	2,000	
October 23	vs. Carlisle	Polo Grounds; New York, NY	W 24–9	9,000–13,000	
October 30	at Army	The Plain; West Point, NY	T 6–6		
November 6	Chicago Athletic Association	Yale Field; New Haven, CT	W 16–6		
November 13	at Harvard	Soldier's Field; Cambridge, MA (rivalry)	T 0–0	25,000	
November 20	Princeton	Yale Field; New Haven, CT (rivalry)	W 6–0	18,000	

== Roster ==
- Frederick W. Allen, T
- Auchincloss, HB
- Hamilton F. Benjamin, HB
- Gordon Brown, G
- George L. Cadwalader, G
- Charles Chadwick, G
- Burr Chamberlain, FB
- George S. Chauncey
- W. Boudinot Conner
- Arthur F. Corwin, HB
- George Barton Cutten, C
- Dantel, HB
- Charles de Saulles, QB
- Charles T. Dudley, E
- Alfred H. Durston, T
- Edwin M. Eddy, E
- Morris Ely, QB
- Gilmore, HB
- John A. Hall, E
- Perry W. Harvey, C
- Josiah J. Hazen, E
- Healey, QB
- Alfred H. Hine, FB
- George W. Hubbell, G
- Kiefer, HB
- Edward E. Marshall, T
- Alexander B. Marvin, HB
- Malcolm McBride, FB
- John S. McFarland, C
- Raymond A. McGee, G
- Post, T
- Ranson, FB
- James O. Rodgers, T
- Richard J. Schweppe, E
- Richard Sheldon, G
- Slocovitch, E
- Louis Ezekiel Stoddard, QB
- Corliss E. Sullivan, QB
- Alfred H. Thomas
- Leonard M. Thomas
- Walker, E
