= 1897 Lafayette football team =

American college football season

1897 Lafayette football
- Conference: Independent
- Record: 9–2–1
- Head coach: Parke H. Davis (3rd season)
- Captain: Charles Rinehart
- Home stadium: March Field

1897 Eastern college football independents records
| | Conf. | | | Overall |
| Team | W | L | T | W | | L | | T |
|---|---|---|---|---|---|---|---|---|
| Penn | | – | | 15 | – | 0 | – | 0 |
| Princeton | | – | | 10 | – | 1 | – | 0 |
| Washington & Jefferson | | – | | 10 | – | 1 | – | 0 |
| Yale | | – | | 9 | – | 0 | – | 2 |
| Buffalo | | – | | 9 | – | 1 | – | 0 |
| Harvard | | – | | 10 | – | 1 | – | 1 |
| Army | | – | | 6 | – | 1 | – | 1 |
| Vermont | | – | | 3 | – | 0 | – | 2 |
| Lafayette | | – | | 9 | – | 2 | – | 1 |
| Drexel | | – | | 6 | – | 2 | – | 1 |
| Colgate | | – | | 5 | – | 2 | – | 1 |
| Dickinson | | – | | 7 | – | 3 | – | 2 |
| Swarthmore | | – | | 7 | – | 3 | – | 2 |
| Fordham | | – | | 2 | – | 1 | – | 1 |
| Cornell | | – | | 5 | – | 3 | – | 1 |
| Syracuse | | – | | 5 | – | 3 | – | 1 |
| Brown | | – | | 7 | – | 4 | – | 0 |
| Carlisle | | – | | 6 | – | 4 | – | 0 |
| Boston College | | – | | 4 | – | 3 | – | 0 |
| Holy Cross | | – | | 4 | – | 3 | – | 1 |
| Wesleyan | | – | | 8 | – | 7 | – | 0 |
| Bucknell | | – | | 3 | – | 3 | – | 1 |
| NYU | | – | | 3 | – | 3 | – | 0 |
| Temple | | – | | 3 | – | 3 | – | 0 |
| Trinity (CT) | | – | | 4 | – | 4 | – | 1 |
| Tufts | | – | | 6 | – | 7 | – | 0 |
| Geneva | | – | | 3 | – | 4 | – | 1 |
| Pittsburgh College | | – | | 3 | – | 5 | – | 2 |
| Villanova | | – | | 3 | – | 5 | – | 1 |
| Penn State | | – | | 3 | – | 6 | – | 0 |
| Amherst | | – | | 2 | – | 6 | – | 2 |
| Franklin & Marshall | | – | | 2 | – | 6 | – | 2 |
| Lehigh | | – | | 3 | – | 7 | – | 0 |
| New Hampshire | | – | | 2 | – | 5 | – | 0 |
| Rutgers | | – | | 2 | – | 5 | – | 0 |
| Western Univ. Penn. | | – | | 1 | – | 3 | – | 0 |

The 1897 Lafayette football team represented Lafayette College in the 1897 college football season. Lafayette shut out eight opponents and finished with a 9–2–1 record in their third year under head coach Parke H. Davis. Significant games included victories over Penn State (24–0) and Lehigh (34–0 and 22–0), a 4–4 tie with Cornell, and losses to Princeton (0–57) and Penn (0–46). The 1895 Lafayette team outscored its opponents by a combined total of 256 to 113.

Three Lafayette players received recognition on the 1897 College Football All-America Team. They are: guard Charles Rinehart (Walter Camp, 2nd team, Outing magazine, 1st team); halfback George B. Walbridge (Camp, 3rd team); and fullback Edward G. Bray (Outing, 2nd team).

== Schedule ==
| Date | Opponent | Site | Result | Attendance | Source |
|---|---|---|---|---|---|
| September 27 | at Bloomsburg Normal | Bloomsburg, PA | W 14–0 | | |
| September 28 | at Wyoming Seminary | Kingston, PA | W 26–0 | | |
| October 2 | Penn State | March Field; Easton, PA | W 24–0 | | |
| October 6 | at Franklin & Marshall | Lancaster, PA | W 8–0 | | |
| October 9 | Temperance A.C. | March Field; Easton, PA | W 64–0 | | |
| October 16 | Cornell | March Field; Easton, PA | T 4–4 | | |
| October 23 | at Penn | Franklin Field; Philadelphia, PA | L 0–46 | 18,000 | |
| October 30 | Lehigh | March Field; Easton, PA (rivalry) | W 34–0 | | |
| November 6 | at Princeton | University Field; Princeton, NJ | L 0–57 | 4,500 | |
| November 13 | Dickinson | March Field; Easton, PA | W 19–0 | | |
| November 20 | Wesleyan | March Field; Easton, PA | W 41–6 | | |
| November 25 | at Lehigh | Bethlehem, PA | W 22–0 | | |
