= 1897 Army Cadets football team =

American college football season

1897 Army Cadets football
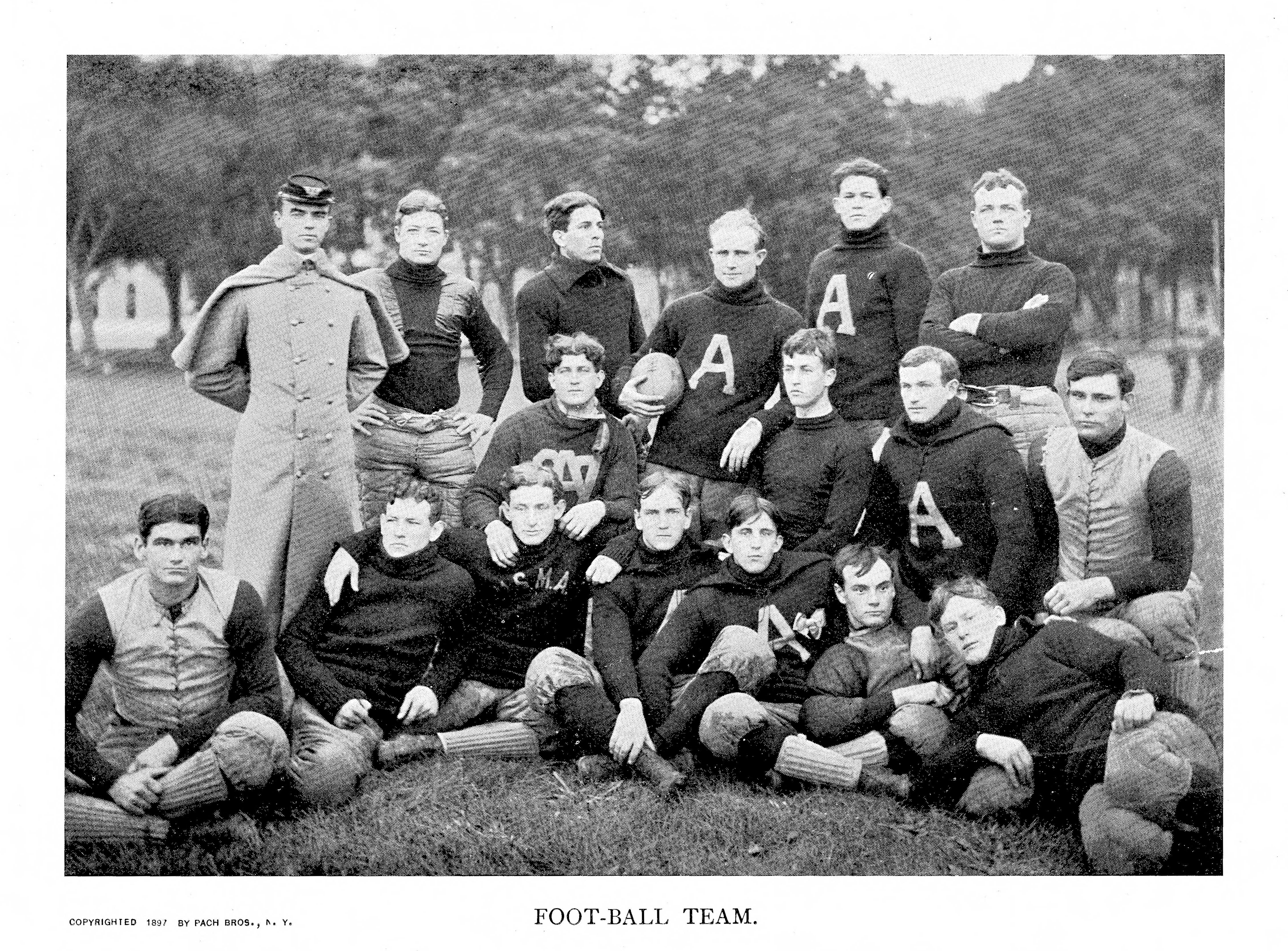
- Conference: Independent
- Record: 6–1–1
- Head coach: Herman Koehler (1st season)
- Captain: William Nesbitt
- Home stadium: The Plain

1897 Eastern college football independents records
	Conf.			Overall
Team	W	L	T	W		L		T
Penn		–		15	–	0	–	0
Princeton		–		10	–	1	–	0
Washington & Jefferson		–		10	–	1	–	0
Yale		–		9	–	0	–	2
Buffalo		–		9	–	1	–	0
Harvard		–		10	–	1	–	1
Army		–		6	–	1	–	1
Vermont		–		3	–	0	–	2
Lafayette		–		9	–	2	–	1
Drexel		–		6	–	2	–	1
Colgate		–		5	–	2	–	1
Dickinson		–		7	–	3	–	2
Swarthmore		–		7	–	3	–	2
Fordham		–		2	–	1	–	1
Cornell		–		5	–	3	–	1
Syracuse		–		5	–	3	–	1
Brown		–		7	–	4	–	0
Carlisle		–		6	–	4	–	0
Boston College		–		4	–	3	–	0
Holy Cross		–		4	–	3	–	1
Wesleyan		–		8	–	7	–	0
Bucknell		–		3	–	3	–	1
NYU		–		3	–	3	–	0
Temple		–		3	–	3	–	0
Trinity (CT)		–		4	–	4	–	1
Tufts		–		6	–	7	–	0
Geneva		–		3	–	4	–	1
Pittsburgh College		–		3	–	5	–	2
Villanova		–		3	–	5	–	1
Penn State		–		3	–	6	–	0
Franklin & Marshall		–		2	–	6	–	2
Lehigh		–		3	–	7	–	0
New Hampshire		–		2	–	5	–	0
Rutgers		–		2	–	5	–	0
Western Univ. Penn.		–		1	–	3	–	0

The 1897 Army Cadets football team represented the United States Military Academy as an independent during the 1897 college football season. In their first season under head coach Herman Koehler, the Cadets compiled a 6–1–1 record and outscored their opponents by a combined total of 194 to 41. The Cadets suffered their only loss against Harvard by a 10 to 0 score and played Yale to a 6–6 tie. The Army–Navy Game was not played in 1897.

Three Army Cadets were honored on the 1897 College Football All-America Team. Halfback William Nesbitt received second-team honors from Walter Camp. Quarterback Leon Kromer received second-team honors from the New York Sun. Tackle Wallace Scales received second-team honors from Walter Camp and New York Sun.

== Schedule ==
Date	Time	Opponent	Site	Result	Attendance	Source
October 2		Trinity (CT)	The Plain; West Point, NY	W 38–6		
October 9	4:10 p.m.	Wesleyan	The Plain; West Point, NY	W 12–9	2,000	
October 16		Harvard	The Plain; West Point, NY	L 0–10	2,000	
October 23		Tufts	The Plain; West Point, NY	W 30–0		
October 30		Yale	The Plain; West Point, NY	T 6–6		
November 6		Lehigh	The Plain; West Point, NY	W 48–6		
November 13		Stevens	The Plain; West Point, NY	W 18–4		
November 20	2:55 p.m.	Brown	The Plain; West Point, NY	W 42–0	2,000	
