= 1897 Brown Bears football team =

American college football season

1897 Brown Bears football
- Conference: Independent
- Record: 7–4
- Head coach: Wallace Moyle (3rd season)
- Captain: Dave Fultz
- Home stadium: Adelaide Park

1897 Eastern college football independents records
	Conf.			Overall
Team	W	L	T	W		L		T
Penn		–		15	–	0	–	0
Princeton		–		10	–	1	–	0
Washington & Jefferson		–		10	–	1	–	0
Yale		–		9	–	0	–	2
Buffalo		–		9	–	1	–	0
Harvard		–		10	–	1	–	1
Army		–		6	–	1	–	1
Vermont		–		3	–	0	–	2
Lafayette		–		9	–	2	–	1
Drexel		–		6	–	2	–	1
Colgate		–		5	–	2	–	1
Dickinson		–		7	–	3	–	2
Swarthmore		–		7	–	3	–	2
Fordham		–		2	–	1	–	1
Cornell		–		5	–	3	–	1
Syracuse		–		5	–	3	–	1
Brown		–		7	–	4	–	0
Carlisle		–		6	–	4	–	0
Boston College		–		4	–	3	–	0
Holy Cross		–		4	–	3	–	1
Wesleyan		–		8	–	7	–	0
Bucknell		–		3	–	3	–	1
NYU		–		3	–	3	–	0
Temple		–		3	–	3	–	0
Trinity (CT)		–		4	–	4	–	1
Tufts		–		6	–	7	–	0
Geneva		–		3	–	4	–	1
Pittsburgh College		–		3	–	5	–	2
Villanova		–		3	–	5	–	1
Penn State		–		3	–	6	–	0
Amherst		–		2	–	6	–	2
Franklin & Marshall		–		2	–	6	–	2
Lehigh		–		3	–	7	–	0
New Hampshire		–		2	–	5	–	0
Rutgers		–		2	–	5	–	0
Western Univ. Penn.		–		1	–	3	–	0

The 1897 Brown Bears football team represented Brown University during the 1897 college football season. Led by Wallace Moyle in his third and final season as head coach, Brown compiled a record of 7–4. The team's captain was Dave Fultz.

== Schedule ==
Date	Time	Opponent	Site	Result	Attendance	Source
October 2		Tufts	Providence, RI	W 24–0		
October 9		Boston University	Adelaide Park; Providence, RI	W 44–0		
October 13		at Phillips Academy	Andover, MA	W 20–4		
October 16		Wesleyan	Adelaide Park; Providence, RI	W 24–12		
October 20		at Yale	Yale Field; New Haven, CT	L 14–18	2,000	
October 23		at Harvard	Soldiers' Field; Boston, MA	L 0–18	8,000	
October 30		Penn	Adelaide Park; Providence, RI	L 0–40		
November 6		at Newton Athletic Association	Newton Centre, MA	W 24–0		
November 13		vs. Carlisle	Polo Grounds; New York, NY	W 18–14	1,500–3,000	
November 20	2:55 p.m.	at Army	The Plain; West Point, NY	L 0–42	2,000	
November 25		Wesleyan	Adelaide Park; Providence, RI	W 12–4	2,000	
