= 1897 Carlisle Indians football team =

American college football season

1897 Carlisle Indians football
- Conference: Independent
- Record: 6–4
- Head coach: William T. Bull (1st season)
- Captain: Bemus Pierce
- Home stadium: Indian Field

1897 Eastern college football independents records
| | Conf. | | | Overall |
| Team | W | L | T | W | | L | | T |
|---|---|---|---|---|---|---|---|---|
| Penn | | – | | 15 | – | 0 | – | 0 |
| Princeton | | – | | 10 | – | 1 | – | 0 |
| Washington & Jefferson | | – | | 10 | – | 1 | – | 0 |
| Yale | | – | | 9 | – | 0 | – | 2 |
| Buffalo | | – | | 9 | – | 1 | – | 0 |
| Harvard | | – | | 10 | – | 1 | – | 1 |
| Army | | – | | 6 | – | 1 | – | 1 |
| Vermont | | – | | 3 | – | 0 | – | 2 |
| Lafayette | | – | | 9 | – | 2 | – | 1 |
| Drexel | | – | | 6 | – | 2 | – | 1 |
| Colgate | | – | | 5 | – | 2 | – | 1 |
| Dickinson | | – | | 7 | – | 3 | – | 2 |
| Swarthmore | | – | | 7 | – | 3 | – | 2 |
| Fordham | | – | | 2 | – | 1 | – | 1 |
| Cornell | | – | | 5 | – | 3 | – | 1 |
| Syracuse | | – | | 5 | – | 3 | – | 1 |
| Brown | | – | | 7 | – | 4 | – | 0 |
| Carlisle | | – | | 6 | – | 4 | – | 0 |
| Boston College | | – | | 4 | – | 3 | – | 0 |
| Holy Cross | | – | | 4 | – | 3 | – | 1 |
| Wesleyan | | – | | 8 | – | 7 | – | 0 |
| Bucknell | | – | | 3 | – | 3 | – | 1 |
| NYU | | – | | 3 | – | 3 | – | 0 |
| Temple | | – | | 3 | – | 3 | – | 0 |
| Trinity (CT) | | – | | 4 | – | 4 | – | 1 |
| Tufts | | – | | 6 | – | 7 | – | 0 |
| Geneva | | – | | 3 | – | 4 | – | 1 |
| Pittsburgh College | | – | | 3 | – | 5 | – | 2 |
| Villanova | | – | | 3 | – | 5 | – | 1 |
| Penn State | | – | | 3 | – | 6 | – | 0 |
| Franklin & Marshall | | – | | 2 | – | 6 | – | 2 |
| Lehigh | | – | | 3 | – | 7 | – | 0 |
| New Hampshire | | – | | 2 | – | 5 | – | 0 |
| Rutgers | | – | | 2 | – | 5 | – | 0 |
| Western Univ. Penn. | | – | | 1 | – | 3 | – | 0 |

The 1897 Carlisle Indians football team represented the Carlisle Indian Industrial School as an independent during the 1897 college football season. Led by William T. Bull in his first only season as head coach, the Indians compiled a record of 6–4 and outscored opponents 232 to 98.

Frank Hudson was the quarterback. On the line were the brothers Bemus Pierce and Hawley Pierce. The two Pierce brothers, each weighing over 200 pounds, were both among the best players of their day. In 1906, The Washington Post declared them the greatest pair of linesman brothers in the history of the sport:

"But the greatest pair of brother linesmen were the Indians, Pierce. Bemus Pierce and Hawley Pierce were right guard and left tackle in the Carlisle line in the old days when the redskin booters of the prolate had everything in the country scared. Two hundred pounds apiece they weighed, and they won games for their team in 97. Tackle back and guard back for a solid half was the Indian play and it was 400 pounds of Pierce into the opponents' line pretty steady. Bemus was captain of the team and one of the best men on the kick-off football has seen. He could measure and place his kicks accurately and every red knew where the ball was going before it soared."

Hudson gained acclaim for drop-kicking field goals against two of the top teams in the country—Yale and Penn. Hudson accounted for all of Carlisle's points in a 20–10 loss to Penn at Franklin Field in Philadelphia. The New York Times wrote that "little Hudson showed his ability as a kicker by dropping the ball squarely between the posts." The game against Yale was played at the Polo Grounds in New York, and The New York Times described Hudson's field goal as follows:

"[S]teadying himself for an instant the ball was dropped and with a delicate touch from his foot was sent sailing straight as a die toward the Yale goal. The spectators held their breath and watched the ball as it sailed on just over the heads of the Yale players and finally dropped over the bar. Then they cheered and young Hudson was the hero of the day. The goal was one of the prettiest ever seen ..."

The success of the Carlisle football team was a source of great pride for Native Americans. In 1897, the Indian Helper (the Carlisle school newspaper) described a celebration that greeted the football team on its return from a game played in New York City against Yale University:

"On Monday morning after breakfast, the football team, who returned the evening before from the Yale game which was played at New York last Saturday, was treated to a free ride across the parade, in the large four horse herdic, drawn by the entire battalion. Capt. Pierce, Frank Cayou, Frank Hudson, and Martin Wheelock occupied the small phaeton drawn by boys, and went in advance of the others. The band played lively marches, as handkerchiefs waved and mouths shouted. The demonstration was a great surprise to all making a unique scene for such an early morning hour. The school is proud of the record made for clean playing, and were gratified that the boys scored.”

== Schedule ==
| Date | Time | Opponent | Site | Result | Attendance | Source |
|---|---|---|---|---|---|---|
| October 2 | | vs. Dickinson | Carlisle, PA | W 36–0 | | |
| October 9 | | at Bloomsburg Normal | Bloomsburg, PA | W 26–0 | | |
| October 16 | | at Princeton | Osborne Field; Princeton, NJ | L 0–18 | 8,000 | |
| October 23 | | vs. Yale | Polo Grounds; New York, NY | L 9–24 | 9,000–13,000 | |
| October 30 | | Pennsylvania College | Indian Field; Carlisle, PA | W 84–0 | | |
| November 6 | | at Penn | Franklin Field; Philadelphia, PA | L 10–20 | 14,000 | |
| November 13 | | vs. Brown | Polo Grounds; New York, NY | L 14–18 | 1,500–3,000 | |
| November 20 | 8:00 p.m. | vs. Illinois | Coliseum; Chicago, IL | W 23–6 | 10,000–12,000 | |
| November 25 | 2:30 p.m. | at Cincinnati | League Park; Cincinnati, OH | W 10–0 | 4,500 | |
| November 27 | | at Ohio Medical | Western League ball park; Columbus, OH | W 20–12 | 2,000–3,000 | |
