= 1897 Wesleyan Methodists football team =

American college football season

1897 Wesleyan Methodists football
- Conference: Independent
- Record: 8–7
- Head coach: Neilson Poe (1st season)
- Captain: Archer E. Young
- Home stadium: Pameacha Park, Hanover Park

1897 Eastern college football independents records
	Conf.			Overall
Team	W	L	T	W		L		T
Penn		–		15	–	0	–	0
Princeton		–		10	–	1	–	0
Washington & Jefferson		–		10	–	1	–	0
Yale		–		9	–	0	–	2
Buffalo		–		9	–	1	–	0
Harvard		–		10	–	1	–	1
Army		–		6	–	1	–	1
Vermont		–		3	–	0	–	2
Lafayette		–		9	–	2	–	1
Drexel		–		6	–	2	–	1
Colgate		–		5	–	2	–	1
Dickinson		–		7	–	3	–	2
Swarthmore		–		7	–	3	–	2
Fordham		–		2	–	1	–	1
Cornell		–		5	–	3	–	1
Syracuse		–		5	–	3	–	1
Brown		–		7	–	4	–	0
Carlisle		–		6	–	4	–	0
Boston College		–		4	–	3	–	0
Holy Cross		–		4	–	3	–	1
Wesleyan		–		8	–	7	–	0
Bucknell		–		3	–	3	–	1
NYU		–		3	–	3	–	0
Temple		–		3	–	3	–	0
Trinity (CT)		–		4	–	4	–	1
Tufts		–		6	–	7	–	0
Geneva		–		3	–	4	–	1
Pittsburgh College		–		3	–	5	–	2
Villanova		–		3	–	5	–	1
Penn State		–		3	–	6	–	0
Amherst		–		2	–	6	–	2
Franklin & Marshall		–		2	–	6	–	2
Lehigh		–		3	–	7	–	0
New Hampshire		–		2	–	5	–	0
Rutgers		–		2	–	5	–	0
Western Univ. Penn.		–		1	–	3	–	0

The 1897 Wesleyan Methodists football team represented Wesleyan University as an independent during the 1897 college football season. Led by Neilson Poe in his first and only season as head coach, the Methodists compiled a record of 8–7. Wesleyan played two home games at Pameacha Park in Middletown, Connecticut and one home game at Hanover Park in Meriden, Connecticut.

== Schedule ==
Date	Time	Opponent	Site	Result	Attendance	Source
September 22		at Waterbury YMCA	YMCA grounds; Waterbury, CT	W 20–0		
September 25		at New Britain YMCA	Electric Field; New Britain, CT	W 28–0		
October 2		at Yale	Yale Field; New Haven, CT	L 0–30	2,000–3,000	
October 6	4:00 p.m.	Massachusetts	Pameacha Park; Middletown, CT	W 18–5		
October 9	4:10 p.m.	at Army	The Plain; West Point, NY	L 9–12	2,000	
October 13	4:00 p.m.	Tufts	Pameacha Park; Middletown, CT	W 16–0		
October 16		at Brown	Adelaide Park; Providence, RI	L 12–24		
October 20	3:30 p.m.	Amherst	Hanover Park; Meriden, CT	W 24–0	1,000	
October 23		at Williams	Weston Field; Williamstown, MA	W 22–0		
October 27		at Amherst	Pratt Field; Amherst, MA	W 14–0	600	
November 3		at Harvard	Soldiers' Field; Boston, MA	L 0–34	1,200–3,000	
November 6	3:00 p.m.	at Trinity (CT)	Hartford, CT (rivalry)	W 6–4	2,000	
November 13		at Penn	Franklin Field; Philadelphia, PA	L 0–22	3,000	
November 20		at Lafayette	March Field; Easton, PA	L 6–41		
November 25		at Brown	Adelaide Park; Providence, RI	L 4–12	2,000	
