= 1897 Harvard Crimson football team =

American college football season

1897 Harvard Crimson football
- Conference: Independent
- Record: 10–1–1
- Head coach: William Cameron Forbes (1st season)
- Captain: Norman Cabot
- Home stadium: Soldiers' Field

1897 Eastern college football independents records
	Conf.			Overall
Team	W	L	T	W		L		T
Penn		–		15	–	0	–	0
Princeton		–		10	–	1	–	0
Washington & Jefferson		–		10	–	1	–	0
Yale		–		9	–	0	–	2
Buffalo		–		9	–	1	–	0
Harvard		–		10	–	1	–	1
Army		–		6	–	1	–	1
Vermont		–		3	–	0	–	2
Lafayette		–		9	–	2	–	1
Drexel		–		6	–	2	–	1
Colgate		–		5	–	2	–	1
Dickinson		–		7	–	3	–	2
Swarthmore		–		7	–	3	–	2
Fordham		–		2	–	1	–	1
Cornell		–		5	–	3	–	1
Syracuse		–		5	–	3	–	1
Brown		–		7	–	4	–	0
Carlisle		–		6	–	4	–	0
Boston College		–		4	–	3	–	0
Holy Cross		–		4	–	3	–	1
Wesleyan		–		8	–	7	–	0
Bucknell		–		3	–	3	–	1
NYU		–		3	–	3	–	0
Temple		–		3	–	3	–	0
Trinity (CT)		–		4	–	4	–	1
Tufts		–		6	–	7	–	0
Geneva		–		3	–	4	–	1
Pittsburgh College		–		3	–	5	–	2
Villanova		–		3	–	5	–	1
Penn State		–		3	–	6	–	0
Amherst		–		2	–	6	–	2
Franklin & Marshall		–		2	–	6	–	2
Lehigh		–		3	–	7	–	0
New Hampshire		–		2	–	5	–	0
Rutgers		–		2	–	5	–	0
Western Univ. Penn.		–		1	–	3	–	0

The 1897 Harvard Crimson football team represented Harvard University in the 1897 college football season. The Crimson finished with a 10–1–1 record and shut out 10 of 12 opponents under first-year head coach William Cameron Forbes, who later served as Governor-General of the Philippines (1908–13) and Ambassador of the United States to Japan (1930–32). The 1897 team won its first ten games by a combined 227–5 score. It then closed the season playing to a scoreless tie with Yale and losing by a 15–6 score against Penn.

Two Harvard players received consensus honors on the 1897 College Football All-America Team: center Allan Doucette and halfback Benjamin Dibblee. Other notable players on Harvard's 1897 team included end Norman Cabot and tackle Malcolm Donald.

== Schedule ==
Date	Time	Opponent	Site	Result	Attendance	Source
October 2	3:00 p.m.	Williams	Soldiers' Field; Boston, MA	W 20–0	2,000–3,000	
October 6		Bowdoin	Soldiers' Field; Boston, MA	W 24–0		
October 9		Dartmouth	Soldiers' Field; Boston, MA (rivalry)	W 13–0	5,000	
October 13	4:00 p.m.	Amherst	Soldiers' Field; Boston, MA	W 38–0	3,000	
October 16		at Army	The Plain; West Point, NY	W 10–0	2,000	
October 20		Newton Athletic Association	Soldiers' Field; Boston, MA	W 24–0		
October 23		Brown	Soldiers' Field; Boston, MA	W 18–0	8,000	
October 26		Newtowne Athletic Club	Soldiers' Field; Boston, MA	W 22–0	1,500	
October 30		Cornell	Soldiers' Field; Boston, MA	W 24–5	6,000	
November 3		Wesleyan	Soldiers' Field; Boston, MA	W 34–0	1,200–3,000	
November 13		Yale	Soldiers' Field; Boston, MA (rivalry)	T 0–0	25,000	
November 20		at Penn	Franklin Field; Philadelphia, PA (rivalry)	L 6–15	25,000	
