= 1897 Drexel Dragons football team =

American college football season

1897 Drexel Dragons football
- Conference: Independent
- Record: 6–2–1
- Head coach: None
- Captain: S. Walter Bishop
- Home stadium: West Philadelphia YMCA

1897 Eastern college football independents records
	Conf.			Overall
Team	W	L	T	W		L		T
Penn		–		15	–	0	–	0
Princeton		–		10	–	1	–	0
Washington & Jefferson		–		10	–	1	–	0
Yale		–		9	–	0	–	2
Buffalo		–		9	–	1	–	0
Harvard		–		10	–	1	–	1
Army		–		6	–	1	–	1
Vermont		–		3	–	0	–	2
Lafayette		–		9	–	2	–	1
Drexel		–		6	–	2	–	1
Colgate		–		5	–	2	–	1
Dickinson		–		7	–	3	–	2
Swarthmore		–		7	–	3	–	2
Fordham		–		2	–	1	–	1
Cornell		–		5	–	3	–	1
Syracuse		–		5	–	3	–	1
Brown		–		7	–	4	–	0
Carlisle		–		6	–	4	–	0
Boston College		–		4	–	3	–	0
Holy Cross		–		4	–	3	–	1
Wesleyan		–		8	–	7	–	0
Bucknell		–		3	–	3	–	1
NYU		–		3	–	3	–	0
Temple		–		3	–	3	–	0
Trinity (CT)		–		4	–	4	–	1
Tufts		–		6	–	7	–	0
Geneva		–		3	–	4	–	1
Pittsburgh College		–		3	–	5	–	2
Villanova		–		3	–	5	–	1
Penn State		–		3	–	6	–	0
Amherst		–		2	–	6	–	2
Franklin & Marshall		–		2	–	6	–	2
Lehigh		–		3	–	7	–	0
New Hampshire		–		2	–	5	–	0
Rutgers		–		2	–	5	–	0
Western Univ. Penn.		–		1	–	3	–	0

The 1897 Drexel Dragons football team did not have a head coach.

== Schedule ==
Date	Opponent	Site	Result	Attendance
October 21	at Wilmington High School (DE)	Warner Athletic Park; Wilmington, DE	L 4–16	
October 27	at Mainheim		L 0–46	
November 2	Northeast Manual Training School		W Forfeit	
November 5	at Chester High School	Chester Park; Chester, PA	T 0–0	300
November 10	at Haddonfield High School	Haddonfield, NJ	W 4–0	200
November 12	at Griffith Athletic Club		W 10–0	
November 17	Eastburn Academy		W Forfeit	
November 19	Friends' Central School		W Forfeit	
November 25	Wilmington High School (DE)		W Forfeit	

== Roster ==
1897 Drexel Dragons football team roster
Players
Coaches
Offense

Pos.	#	Name	Class
TE, DE		John Schofield	Fr
OT		Edwin Potts	Fr
G		John Kaighn	Fr
C		George Moses	Fr
G		A. Carl Reeves	Fr
OT		Robert Grover	Fr
TE		C. Thompson	Fr
HB		S. Walter Bishop (C)	Sr
HB		Randolph M.	Fr
QB		Charles Carson	Fr
		John Griffith	Fr
		Arthur V. Dee	Jr
		Harold Perkins	Sr
		Davys Gilpin	So
		John Hedges	Jr

Defense

Pos.	#	Name	Class
LB, P		Otto Fischer	Fr

Special teams

Pos.	#	Name	Class

Head coach

- No coach

Coordinators/assistant coaches

Legend

- (C) Team captain
- (S) Suspended
- (I) Ineligible
- Injured
- Redshirt

Roster
Last update: 21 September 2018
