= 1897 Penn Quakers football team =

American college football season

1897 Penn Quakers football
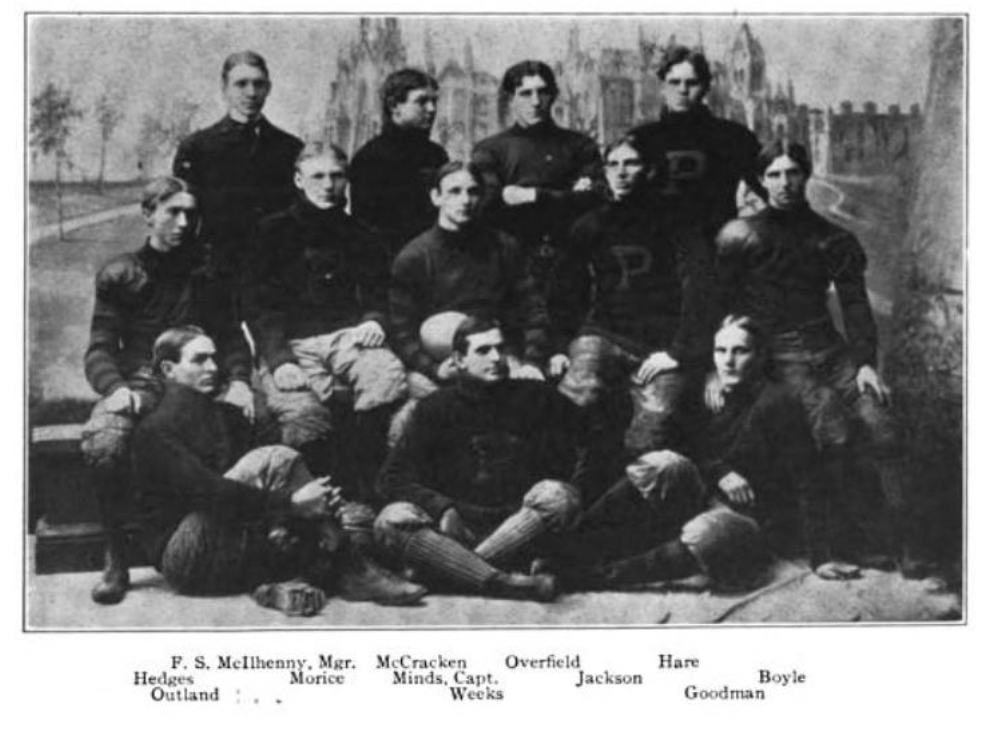

National champion (Billingsley, Helms, Houlgate, NCF) Co-national champion (Davis)
- Conference: Independent
- Record: 15–0
- Head coach: George Washington Woodruff (6th season)
- Captain: John Minds
- Home stadium: Franklin Field

1897 Eastern college football independents records
	Conf.			Overall
Team	W	L	T	W		L		T
Penn		–		15	–	0	–	0
Princeton		–		10	–	1	–	0
Washington & Jefferson		–		10	–	1	–	0
Yale		–		9	–	0	–	2
Buffalo		–		9	–	1	–	0
Harvard		–		10	–	1	–	1
Army		–		6	–	1	–	1
Vermont		–		3	–	0	–	2
Lafayette		–		9	–	2	–	1
Drexel		–		6	–	2	–	1
Colgate		–		5	–	2	–	1
Dickinson		–		7	–	3	–	2
Swarthmore		–		7	–	3	–	2
Fordham		–		2	–	1	–	1
Cornell		–		5	–	3	–	1
Syracuse		–		5	–	3	–	1
Brown		–		7	–	4	–	0
Carlisle		–		6	–	4	–	0
Boston College		–		4	–	3	–	0
Holy Cross		–		4	–	3	–	1
Wesleyan		–		8	–	7	–	0
Bucknell		–		3	–	3	–	1
NYU		–		3	–	3	–	0
Temple		–		3	–	3	–	0
Trinity (CT)		–		4	–	4	–	1
Tufts		–		6	–	7	–	0
Geneva		–		3	–	4	–	1
Pittsburgh College		–		3	–	5	–	2
Villanova		–		3	–	5	–	1
Penn State		–		3	–	6	–	0
Amherst		–		2	–	6	–	2
Franklin & Marshall		–		2	–	6	–	2
Lehigh		–		3	–	7	–	0
New Hampshire		–		2	–	5	–	0
Rutgers		–		2	–	5	–	0
Western Univ. Penn.		–		1	–	3	–	0

The 1897 Penn Quakers football team represented the University of Pennsylvania in the 1897 college football season. The team finished with a 15–0 record and was retroactively named as the national champion by the Billingsley Report, Helms Athletic Foundation, Houlgate System, and National Championship Foundation, and as a co-national champion by Parke H. Davis. They outscored their opponents 463 to 20.

== Schedule ==
Date	Time	Opponent	Site	Result	Attendance	Source
September 22		at Bucknell	Bucknell campus; Lewisburg, PA	W 17–0		
September 25		Franklin & Marshall	Franklin Field; Philadelphia, PA	W 33–0	1,500	
September 29	3:47 p.m.	Washington & Jefferson	Franklin Field; Philadelphia, PA	W 18–4	1,000	
October 2	3:15 p.m.	Bucknell	Franklin Field; Philadelphia, PA	W 33–0		
October 6	3:40 p.m.	Gettysburg	Franklin Field; Philadelphia, PA	W 57–0	1,500	
October 9	3:07 p.m.	Lehigh	Franklin Field; Philadelphia, PA	W 58–0	4,000	
October 13	3:41 p.m.	Virginia	Franklin Field; Philadelphia, PA	W 42–0	3,000	
October 16	3:21 p.m.	Dartmouth	Franklin Field; Philadelphia, PA	W 34–0	5,000	
October 20		Penn State	Franklin Field; Philadelphia, PA	W 24–0	500	
October 23		Lafayette	Franklin Field; Philadelphia, PA	W 46–0	18,000	
October 30		at Brown	Adelaide Park; Providence, RI	W 40–0		
November 6		Carlisle	Franklin Field; Philadelphia, PA	W 20–10	14,000	
November 13		Wesleyan	Franklin Field; Philadelphia, PA	W 22–0	3,000	
November 20		Harvard	Franklin Field; Philadelphia, PA (rivalry)	W 15–6	25,000	
November 25		Cornell	Franklin Field; Philadelphia, PA (rivalry)	W 4–0	20,000	

== Legacy ==
Head coach George Washington Woodruff and players Truxtun Hare, John Minds, and John H. Outland are all inductees of the College Football Hall of Fame. Outland is the namesake of the Outland Trophy, awarded annually to the best college football interior lineman. The Quakers' 15 wins in a single season would not be equalled until the 2018 Clemson Tigers.
