= 1897 Williams Ephs football team =

American college football season

1897 Williams Ephs football
- Conference: Triangular Football League
- Record: 1–7–1 (0–1–1 TFL)
- Head coach: None
- Home stadium: Weston Field

1897 Triangular Football League standings
	Conf.					Overall
Team	W		L		T	W		L		T
Dartmouth $	2	–	0	–	0	4	–	3	–	0
Amherst	0	–	1	–	1	2	–	6	–	2
Williams	0	–	1	–	1	1	–	7	–	1
$ – Conference champion

The 1897 Williams Ephs football team represented the Williams College as a member of the Triangular Football League (TFL) during the 1897 college football season. Williams compiled an overall record of 1–7–1 with a mark of 0–1–1 in conference play, tying for second place in the TFL. The team played home games at Weston Field in Williamstown, Massachusetts.

== Schedule ==
Date	Time	Opponent	Site	Result	Attendance	Source
September 25	2:30 p.m.	Laureates of Troy*	Weston Field; Williamstown, MA	W 6–0		
October 2	3:00 p.m.	at Harvard*	Soldiers' Field; Cambridge, MA	L 0–20	2,000–3,000	
October 9		at Yale*	Yale Field; New Haven, CT	L 0–32		
October 16		vs. Lehigh*	Albany, NY	L 0–5		
October 23		Wesleyan*	Weston Field; Williamstown, MA	L 0–22		
October 30		Colgate*	Weston Field; Williamstown, MA	L 0–18	800	
November 6	3:15 p.m.	at Amherst	Pratt Field; Amherst, MA (rivalry)	T 6–6		
November 13	2:30 p.m.	vs. Cornell*	Olympic Park; Buffalo, NY	L 0–42	3,000–5,000	
November 20		Dartmouth	Weston Field; Williamstown, MA	L 0–52		
*Non-conference game
