= 1897 college football season =

American college football season

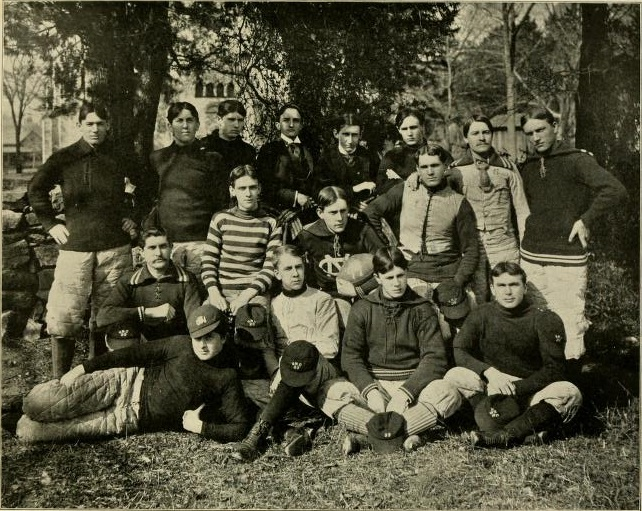
- 1897 North Carolina team
- Total No. of teams: 28
- Regular season: September 8 to November 27
- Champion(s): Pennsylvania; Yale

The 1897 college football season had no clear-cut champion, with the Official NCAA Division I Football Records Book listing Pennsylvania and Yale as having been selected national champions.

== Conference and program changes ==
=== Conference establishments ===
- One conference played its final season in 1897:
  - Western Interstate University Football Association – active since 1892

=== Membership changes ===
School	1896 Conference	1897 Conference
Arizona Normal Football	Program Established	Independent
Central Colonels	Independent	SIAA
Gallaudet Bison	Independent	MIFA

== Conference standings ==
=== Major conference standings ===
1897 Colorado Football Association standings
	Conf.					Overall
Team	W		L		T	W		L		T
Colorado $	2	–	0	–	0	7	–	1	–	0
Colorado Mines	1	–	1	–	0	2	–	2	–	0
Colorado College	0	–	2	–	0	3	–	5	–	0
$ – Conference champion

1897 Triangular Football League standings
	Conf.					Overall
Team	W		L		T	W		L		T
Dartmouth $	2	–	0	–	0	4	–	3	–	0
Amherst	0	–	1	–	1	2	–	6	–	2
Williams	0	–	1	–	1	1	–	7	–	1
$ – Conference champion

1897 Maryland Intercollegiate Football Association standings
	Conf.					Overall
Team	W		L		T	W		L		T
Gallaudet $	3	–	0	–	1	4	–	1	–	1
Maryland	0	–	3	–	0	2	–	4	–	0
$ – Conference champion

1897 Western Conference football standings
	Conf.					Overall
Team	W		L		T	W		L		T
Wisconsin $	3	–	0	–	0	9	–	1	–	0
Chicago	3	–	1	–	0	11	–	1	–	0
Michigan	2	–	1	–	0	6	–	1	–	1
Illinois	1	–	1	–	0	6	–	2	–	0
Purdue	1	–	2	–	0	5	–	3	–	1
Northwestern	0	–	2	–	0	5	–	3	–	0
Minnesota	0	–	3	–	0	4	–	4	–	0
$ – Conference champion

1897 Southern Intercollegiate Athletic Association football standings
	Conf.					Overall
Team	W		L		T	W		L		T
Vanderbilt $	3	–	0	–	0	6	–	0	–	1
Georgia	2	–	0	–	0	2	–	1	–	0
Auburn	2	–	0	–	1	2	–	0	–	1
Central (KY)	1	–	1	–	0	1	–	2	–	0
Nashville	1	–	1	–	0	1	–	1	–	0
Alabama	0	–	0	–	0	1	–	0	–	0
Tennessee	0	–	0	–	0	4	–	1	–	1
Texas	0	–	0	–	0	6	–	2	–	0
LSU	0	–	0	–	0	1	–	1	–	0
Sewanee	1	–	2	–	1	1	–	3	–	1
Clemson	0	–	1	–	0	2	–	2	–	0
Mercer	0	–	1	–	0	0	–	2	–	1
Cumberland (TN)	0	–	1	–	0	0	–	1	–	0
Kentucky State College	0	–	2	–	0	2	–	4	–	0
SW Presbyterian	0	–	0	–	0	0	–	0	–	0
$ – Conference champion

1897 Western Interstate University Football Association standings
	Conf.					Overall
Team	W		L		T	W		L		T
Nebraska $	3	–	0	–	0	5	–	1	–	0
Kansas	2	–	1	–	0	8	–	2	–	0
Iowa	0	–	2	–	0	4	–	4	–	0
Missouri	0	–	2	–	0	5	–	6	–	0
$ – Conference champion

=== Independents ===
1897 Eastern college football independents records
	Conf.			Overall
Team	W	L	T	W		L		T
Penn		–		15	–	0	–	0
Princeton		–		10	–	1	–	0
Washington & Jefferson		–		10	–	1	–	0
Yale		–		9	–	0	–	2
Buffalo		–		9	–	1	–	0
Harvard		–		10	–	1	–	1
Army		–		6	–	1	–	1
Vermont		–		3	–	0	–	2
Lafayette		–		9	–	2	–	1
Drexel		–		6	–	2	–	1
Colgate		–		5	–	2	–	1
Dickinson		–		7	–	3	–	2
Swarthmore		–		7	–	3	–	2
Fordham		–		2	–	1	–	1
Cornell		–		5	–	3	–	1
Syracuse		–		5	–	3	–	1
Brown		–		7	–	4	–	0
Carlisle		–		6	–	4	–	0
Boston College		–		4	–	3	–	0
Holy Cross		–		4	–	3	–	1
Wesleyan		–		8	–	7	–	0
Bucknell		–		3	–	3	–	1
NYU		–		3	–	3	–	0
Temple		–		3	–	3	–	0
Trinity (CT)		–		4	–	4	–	1
Tufts		–		6	–	7	–	0
Geneva		–		3	–	4	–	1
Pittsburgh College		–		3	–	5	–	2
Villanova		–		3	–	5	–	1
Penn State		–		3	–	6	–	0
Franklin & Marshall		–		2	–	6	–	2
Lehigh		–		3	–	7	–	0
New Hampshire		–		2	–	5	–	0
Rutgers		–		2	–	5	–	0
Western Univ. Penn.		–		1	–	3	–	0

1897 Midwestern college football independents records
	Conf.			Overall
Team	W	L	T	W		L		T
Butler		–		3	–	0	–	0
Fairmount		–		1	–	0	–	0
Washburn		–		7	–	1	–	0
Cincinnati		–		9	–	1	–	1
Iowa State Normal		–		5	–	1	–	0
Ohio Wesleyan		–		7	–	1	–	1
Indiana		–		6	–	1	–	1
Ohio		–		7	–	2	–	0
Carthage		–		3	–	1	–	0
Iowa Agricultural		–		3	–	1	–	0
Notre Dame		–		4	–	1	–	1
Central Michigan		–		2	–	1	–	0
Baldwin–Wallace		–		2	–	1	–	1
Chicago Dental Infirmary		–		2	–	2	–	1
Lake Forest		–		4	–	5	–	1
Drake		–		2	–	3	–	0
Heidelberg		–		2	–	3	–	0
Detroit College		–		1	–	2	–	0
Indiana Normal		–		1	–	4	–	0
Kansas State		–		1	–	2	–	1
Mount Union		–		2	–	4	–	1
Rush Medical College		–		1	–	4	–	1
DePauw		–		2	–	6	–	0
Wittenberg		–		2	–	6	–	0
Haskell		–		1	–	4	–	0
Indiana State Normal		–		1	–	4	–	0
Ohio State		–		1	–	7	–	1
Lincoln (MO)		–		0	–	1	–	0
South Dakota Agricultural		–		0	–	1	–	0
Washington University		–		0	–	2	–	0
North Dakota Agricultural		–		0	–	3	–	0

1897 Southern college football independents records
	Conf.			Overall
Team	W	L	T	W		L		T
Oklahoma		–		2	–	0	–	0
Arkansas		–		2	–	0	–	1
Navy		–		8	–	1	–	0
Virginia		–		6	–	2	–	1
Add-Ran		–		3	–	1	–	0
Washington and Lee		–		3	–	1	–	0
VPI		–		5	–	2	–	0
North Carolina		–		7	–	3	–	0
VMI		–		3	–	2	–	0
Guilford		–		2	–	1	–	0
West Virginia		–		5	–	4	–	1
Davidson		–		1	–	1	–	0
Georgia Tech		–		1	–	1	–	0
Columbian		–		4	–	5	–	1
Richmond		–		3	–	5	–	0
North Carolina A&M		–		1	–	2	–	0
Texas A&M		–		1	–	2	–	0
Delaware		–		1	–	5	–	1
William & Mary		–		0	–	1	–	0
Marshall		–		0	–	3	–	0
South Carolina		–		0	–	3	–	0

1897 Far West college football independents records
	Conf.			Overall
Team	W	L	T	W		L		T
Oregon Agricultural		–		5	–	0	–	0
Washington Agricultural		–		2	–	0	–	0
Wyoming		–		2	–	0	–	0
USC		–		5	–	1	–	0
Stanford		–		4	–	1	–	0
New Mexico A&M		–		1	–	0	–	1
Oregon		–		1	–	1	–	0
Montana		–		1	–	2	–	3
Washington		–		1	–	2	–	0
Montana Agricultural		–		1	–	3	–	0
California		–		0	–	3	–	2
Utah		–		1	–	5	–	0
Arizona Normal		–		0	–	1	–	0
Idaho		–		0	–	1	–	0
Nevada State		–		0	–	1	–	0

=== Minor conferences ===
Conference	Champion(s)	Record
Michigan Intercollegiate Athletic Association	Kalamazoo	5–0

1897 Midwestern Black Schools and HBCU football standings
	Conf.					Overall
Team	W		L		T	W		L		T
Lincoln High School (KC) $	1	–	0	–	0	1	–	0	–	0
Western University	0	–	1	–	0	0	–	1	–	0
Lincoln (MO)	0	–	0	–	0	0	–	1	–	0
$ – Conference champion

== See also ==
- 1897 College Football All-America Team
