= 2026 Louisville Cardinals football team =

American college football season

2026 Louisville Cardinals football
- Conference: Atlantic Coast Conference

Ranking
- Coaches: No. 18
- AP: No. 18
- CFP: No. 23
- Record: 8–3 (7–2 ACC)
- Head coach: Jeff Brohm (4th season)
- Offensive coordinator: Brian Brohm (4th season)
- Offensive scheme: Spread
- Co-defensive coordinators: Mark Ivey (1st season); Steve Ellis (1st season)
- Base defense: Multiple 4–2–5
- Home stadium: L&N Federal Credit Union Stadium

Uniform
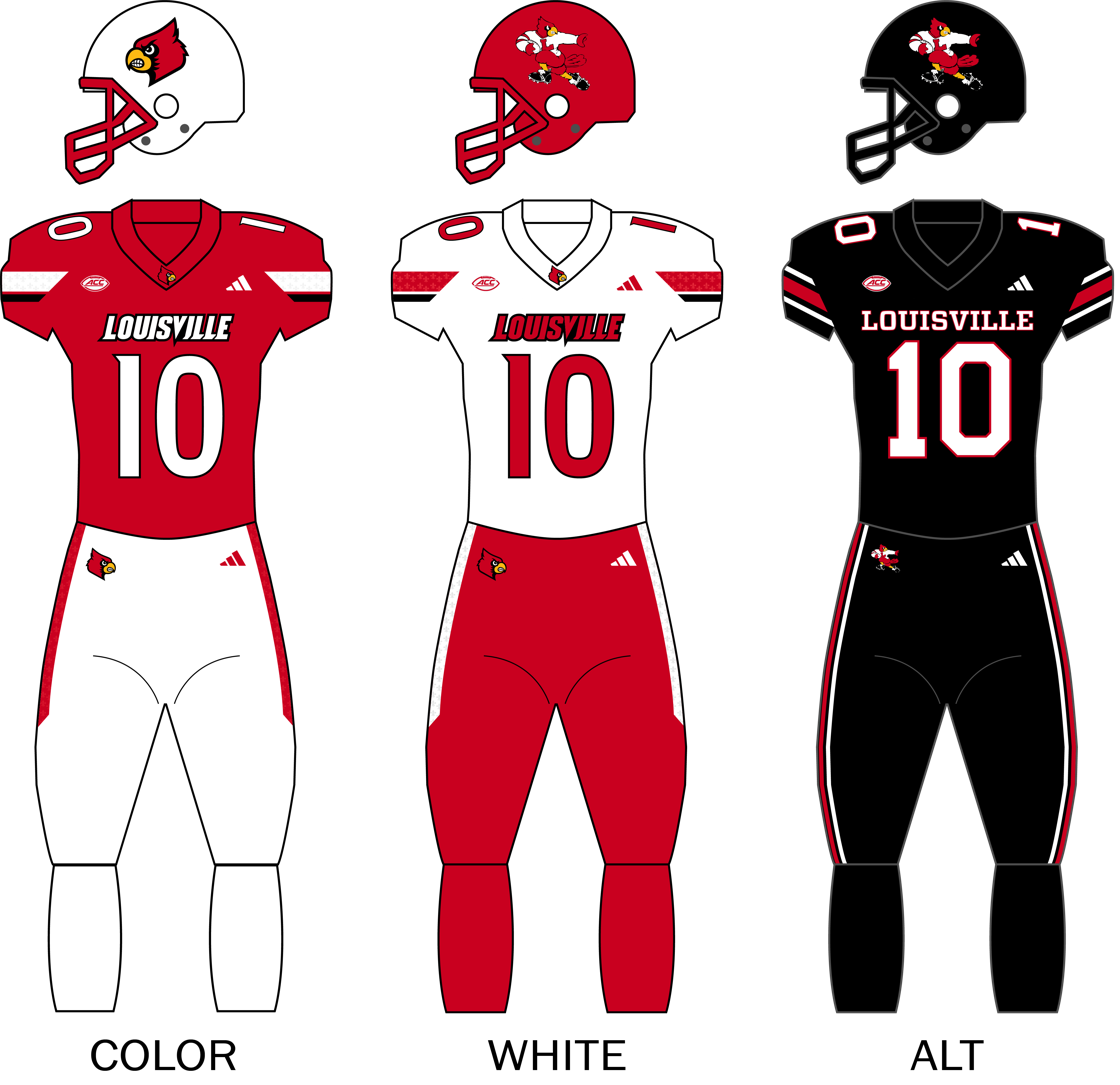

2026 Atlantic Coast Conference football standings
	Conf.			Overall
Team	W		L	W		L
No. 7 Miami (FL) y	8	–	0	10	–	1
No. 11 Wake Forest y	7	–	1	10	–	1
No. 23 Louisville	7	–	2	8	–	3
Clemson	5	–	3	7	–	4
SMU	5	–	3	7	–	4
Duke	4	–	4	7	–	4
Stanford	4	–	4	6	–	5
Virginia	4	–	4	6	–	5
Boston College	3	–	4	5	–	6
Pittsburgh	3	–	5	6	–	5
Virginia Tech	3	–	5	6	–	5
NC State	3	–	5	5	–	6
Florida State	3	–	5	5	–	6
Syracuse	3	–	6	5	–	6
North Carolina	2	–	5	5	–	6
California	2	–	6	3	–	8
Georgia Tech	2	–	6	3	–	8
Championship: Miami (FL) vs. Wake Forest
^ – College Football Playoff participant; $ – Conference champion; y – Championship game participant; As of November 22, 2026; Rankings from CFP rankings

The 2026 Louisville Cardinals football team represents the University of Louisville as they a member of the Atlantic Coast Conference (ACC) during the 2026 NCAA Division I FBS football season. The Cardinals are led by fourth-year head coach Jeff Brohm and their play home games at the L&N Federal Credit Union Stadium located in Louisville, Kentucky.

== Offseason ==
=== Personnel ===
On December 15, 2025, tight ends coach Ryan Wallace left the program to take the same position at Oregon State.

On December 30, 2025, it was reported that defensive coordinator Ron English and defensive line coach Mark Hagen would not be returning. English was said to be stepping away for a year to watch his son play football while Hagen's contract ended after the 2025 season.

Long time Louisville assistant coach and recruiter Pete Nochta was hired away from Louisville by rival Kentucky. Louisville bolstered its recruiting staff with the additions of Nate Dennison and former Kentucky general manager Chase Heuke.

=== Players leaving for NFL ===
Louisville had one player chosen in the 2026 NFL draft.

==== NFL draftees ====
Round	Pick	Player	Position	NFL team
3	94	Chris Bell	WR	Miami Dolphins

==== Undrafted free agents ====
Player	Position	NFL team
Caullin Lacy	WR	New York Jets
Miller Moss	QB	Chicago Bears
Rene Konga	DT	Miami Dolphins
TJ Quinn	LB	Green Bay Packers
Rasheed Miller	OT	Tennessee Titans
Trevonte Sylvester	OT	Baltimore Ravens
Wesley Bailey	LB	Los Angeles Rams
Pete Nygra	C	Kansas City Chiefs

=== Transfer portal ===
As of June 24, 2026, 32 players have entered the NCAA transfer portal during or after the 2026 season.

==== Departures ====
Position	Player	Destination
Offense
QB	Brady Allen	Indiana State
QB	Deuce Adams	Wisconsin
QB	Mason Mims	ETSU
RB	Duke Watson	UCF
RB	Shaun Boykins Jr.	Delaware State
RB	Jamarice Wilder	Southern Miss
TE	Nate Kurisky	Duke
TE	Grant Houser	Colorado State
TE	Davon Mitchell	Grambling State
WR	Kris Hughes	Withdrawn
WR	Bobby Golden	
WR	Antonio Meeks	Wake Forest
WR	Brock Coffman	Kentucky
WR	Eli Adams	Wisconsin
OL	Carter Guillaume	Oregon State
OL	Jordan Church	Texas Tech
OL	Ransom McDermott	Temple
OL	Fred Johnson	UConn
OL	James Glover-Tyson	

Position	Player	Destination
Defense
DE	CJ May	Missouri
DE	Maurice Davis	
DE	Justin Beadles	California
DL	Jerry Lawson	Oklahoma State
DL	Xavier Porter	ETSU
DL	Selah Brown	Bowling Green
DL	Kendrick Gilbert	Ball State
CB	Rae'mon Mosby	ECU
CB	Jaden Minkins	Stephen F. Austin
CB	Justin Agu	Tulane
S	Corey Gordon Jr.	Kansas
S	Daeh McCullough	Western Michigan
S	Dylan Rowsey	Murray State

Position	Player	Destination
Special Teams
K	Cooper Ranvier	Tennessee
P	Carter Schwartz	Arizona

==== Incoming ====
Position	Player	Prev. School
Offense
QB	Lincoln Kienholz	Ohio State
QB	Davin Wydner	West Georgia
RB	Marquise Davis	Missouri
TE	Brody Foley	Tulsa
TE	Justyn Reid	Tulane
WR	Elizjah Lewis	Pace
WR	Montavin Quisenberry	Kentucky
WR	Tre Richardson	Vanderbilt
WR	Jackson Voth	Drake
WR	Lawayne McCoy	Florida State
OT	Anwar O'neal	Delaware
OT	Cason Henry	South Carolina
OL	Johnnie Brown	Georgia Southern
OL	Eryx Daugherty	Boston College
OL	Evan Wibberley	Kentucky

Position	Player	Prev. School
Defense
DL	Tommy Ziesmer	Eastern Kentucky
DL	Daylen Russell	Miami (FL)
DL	Demeco Kennedy	Purdue
DL	Jacob Smith	Kentucky
DL	Jerrod Smith	Kentucky
DL	Joshua Donald	Houston
LB	Benjamin Perry	UCLA
CB	DJ Waller	Kentucky
CB	Santana Wilson	Texas
CB	Kaleb Beasley	Tennessee
CB	Myles Norwood	South Carolina
CB	Brycen Scott	Elon
S	Koen Entringer	Iowa
S	Travaris Banks	Ole Miss
EDGE	Tyler Thompson	North Carolina

Position	Player	Prev. School
Special Teams
P	Jacob Baker	Eastern Kentucky
LS	Ryan Manis	Liberty
K	Garth White	Rhode Island

== Preseason ==
=== ACC media poll ===
The Atlantic Coast Conference preseason poll was released on July 28, 2026. Louisville was predicted to finish third in the conference and received three first place votes.

=== Preseason ACC awards ===
Pre-season ACC Player of the Year

Ranking	Player	Position	Votes
3	Isaac Brown	RB	16

Pre-season all-conference teams

Ranking	Player	Position	Votes
RB	Isaac Brown	Jr.	94
DE	Clev Lubin	Sr.	79

=== Award watch lists ===
Award	Player/Coach	Position	Year	Source
Lott Trophy	Clev Lubin	DL	Sr.	
Dodd Trophy	Jeff Brohm	HC	—N/a	
Maxwell Award	Isaac Brown	RB	Jr.	
Outland Trophy	Lance Robinson	C	GS	
Bronko Nagurski Trophy	Clev Lubin	DL	Sr.	
Bronko Nagurski Trophy	Koen Entringer	S	R-Jr.	
Paul Hornung Award	Tre Richardson	WR	Sr.	
Wuerffel Trophy	Clev Lubin	DL	Sr.	
Walter Camp Award	Isaac Brown	RB	Jr.	
Biletnikoff Award	Tre Richardson	WR	Sr.	
John Mackey Award	Brody Foley	TE	R-Sr.	
Bednarik Award	Clev Lubin	DL	Sr.	
Rotary Lombardi Award	Clev Lubin	DL	Sr.	

== Schedule ==
Date	Time	Opponent	Rank	Site	TV	Result	Attendance
September 6	7:30 p.m.	vs. No. 9 Ole Miss*	No. 24	Nissan Stadium; Nashville, TN (Music City Kickoff)	ABC	L 38–41	57,390
September 11	7:00 p.m.	No. 21 (FCS) Villanova*	No. 24	L&N Federal Credit Union Stadium; Louisville, KY	ACCN	W 59–13	46,385
September 19	3:30 p.m.	No. 16 SMU	No. 23	L&N Federal Credit Union Stadium; Louisville, KY	ESPN2	W 41–31	50,199
September 26	12:00 p.m.	Wake Forest	No. 16	L&N Federal Credit Union Stadium; Louisville, KY	ESPN	L 27–30	46,042
October 3	3:30 p.m.	at NC State		Carter–Finley Stadium; Raleigh, NC	ACCN	L 28–31	56,919
October 9	7:00 p.m.	Florida State		L&N Federal Credit Union Stadium; Louisville, KY	ESPN	W 44–20	48,992
October 17	7:30 p.m.	at Syracuse		JMA Wireless Dome; Syracuse, NY	ACCN	W 34–26	39,293
October 31	3:15 p.m.	Stanford		L&N Federal Credit Union Stadium; Louisville, KY	ACCN	W 52–24	44,308
November 7	7:30 p.m.	at Georgia Tech		Bobby Dodd Stadium; Atlanta, GA	ACCN	W 44–17	44,680
November 14	7:00 p.m.	at North Carolina		Kenan Stadium; Chapel Hill, NC	ESPN2	W 16–14	44,664
November 21	7:30 p.m.	Pittsburgh	No. 23	L&N Federal Credit Union Stadium; Louisville, KY	ESPN2	W 42–10	45,892
November 28	12:00 p.m.	at Kentucky*		Kroger Field; Lexington, KY (Governor's Cup)	ESPN2		
*Non-conference game; Rankings from AP Poll (and CFP Rankings, after November 3) - Released prior to game; All times are in Eastern time

== Rankings ==
Ranking movements Legend: ██ Increase in ranking ██ Decrease in ranking — = Not ranked RV = Received votes
	Week															
Poll	Pre	1	2	3	4	5	6	7	8	9	10	11	12	13	14	Final
AP	24	24	23	16	RV	—	—	—	—	RV	RV	21	18			
Coaches	RV	RV	RV	19	RV	—	—	—	—	—	RV	22	18			
CFP	Not released									—	—	23				Not released

== Roster ==
2026 Louisville Cardinals football team roster
Players
Coaches
Offense

Pos.	#	Name	Class
WR	0	Tre Richardson	Sr
RB	1	Isaac Brown	Jr
WR	2	TreyShun Hurry	Sr
QB	3	Lincoln Kienholz	Jr
RB	5	Keyjuan Brown	Jr
WR	7	Lawayne McCoy	Jr
QB	10	Briggs Cherry	Fr
QB	11	Davin Wydner	Jr
WR	14	Kris Hughes	Jr
TE	15	Julius Miles	Fr
QB	17	Ryan Zimmerman	So
WR	18	Terrence McWilliams Jr.	Jr
QB	19	Mason Fields	Fr
RB	22	Lekhy Thompkins	Fr
RB	24	Marquise Davis	Fr
RB	32	Braxton Jennings	Fr
WR	42	Rhys Dorsey	Fr
QB/TE	44	Travis Egan	Jr
WR	45	Marlon Harbin	Fr
WR	46	Elizjah Lewis	GS
WR	49	DeVaun Jones	So
OL	52	Max Merz	Fr
OL	53	Lance Robinson	GS
OL	55	Jimmy Williams III	So
OL	56	Eryx Daugherty	Jr
OL	57	Naeer Jackson	Sr
OL	58	Evan Wibberly	Sr
OL	61	Gradey Anthony	Fr
OL	63	Bryten Close	Fr
OL	65	Ellis McAdoo	So
OL	66	Johnnie Brown III	Fr
OL	67	James Glover-Tyson	Jr
OL	70	Anwar O'neal	Sr
OL	71	Cason Henry	Sr
OL	72	Sam Secrest	Sr
OL	73	Ben Corhei	Fr
OL	74	Jarvis Strickland	Fr
OL	75	Cameron Gorin	Fr
OL	78	Charlie Edgeworth	Fr
TE	80	Brody Foley	Sr
WR	81	Jakob Dixon	Sr
WR	82	Montavin Quisenberry	Fr
WR	83	DJ Williams	Fr
WR	84	Payton Cook	Fr
TE	85	Justyn Reid	Sr
WR	86	Jackson Voth	Jr
TE	87	Dylan Mesman	So
TE	88	Jaleel Skinner	Sr
WR	89	Gavin Waddell	Fr
TE	90	Hamilton Atkins	So

Defense

Pos.	#	Name	Class
DL	2	Demeco Kennedy	Jr
LB	3	Tyler Thompson	Jr
DB	4	T.J. Banks	Jr
DB	5	Koen Entringer	Jr
LB	6	Stanquan Clark	Sr
LB	9	Antonio Watts	Sr
DB	10	Kaleb Beasley	Jr
LB	11	T.J. Capers	Jr
CB	12	DJ Waller Jr.	Jr
DB	13	Tayon Holloway	Sr
DL	17	AJ Green	Jr
DL	19	Micah Carter	Jr
DB	20	Antonio Harris	Fr
DB	21	Jaydin Broadnax	Fr
LB	23	Benjamin Perry	Sr
DB	25	Brycen Scott	So
S	26	Jordan Vann	Fr
DB	27	Miles Norwood	Sr
DB	28	Santana Wilson	So
DB	29	Blake Ruffin	GS
LB	30	Taj Powell	Fr
DB	31	Micah Rice	Fr
DB	33	Kris Brunson	Fr
LB	34	Brady Ballart	Fr
LB	36	Jacob Smith	So
DB	37	Anderson Miller	So
LB	38	Cameron White	Fr
DB	39	Jordan Gervais	Fr
DL	40	Eric Hazzard	Fr
LB	41	Caleb Matelau	Fr
LB	43	Trent Carter	So
DB	47	Gerion McPherson	Fr
DL	50	Clev Lubin	Sr
DL	62	Chris Jones Jr.	Fr
DL	90	Daylen Russell	Fr
DL	91	Keon Webb	So
DL	93	Bailey Abercrombie	Fr
DL	94	Dillon Smith	Fr
DL	95	Joshua Donald	Jr
DL	96	Tommy Ziesmer	Jr
DL	97	Maurice Davis	So
DL	98	Sam Dawson	Fr
DL	99	Jerod Smith II	Jr

Special teams

Pos.	#	Name	Class
K	35	Carson Hilbert	Fr
P	48	Jacob Baker	Jr
LS	51	Hayden Travelstead	Jr
LS	54	Drew Kegebein	Fr
LS	77	Ryan Manis	So
K	92	Garth White	GS
K/P	95	Bode Shoaps	Fr
P	96	Adam Winkenhofer	So
K	98	Nick Keller	Sr

Head coach

- Jeff Brohm

Coordinators/assistant coaches

- Brian Brohm – Offensive coordinator/Quarterbacks
- Mark Ivey – Co-defensive coordinator/Defensive line
- Steve Ellis – Co-defensive coordinator/Secondary
- Chris Barclay – Running backs
- Deion Branch – Wide receivers
- Karl Maslowski – Special teams coordinator/Assistant linebackers
- Paul Petrino – Senior offensive assistant/Tight ends
- Dale Williams – Offensive line
- Adam Mueller – Defensive assistant/Linebackers
- Brandon Sharp – Defensive assistant/Safeties
- Jontavius Morris – Defensive assistant
- David Elson – Defensive assistant
- Derrick Jackson – Defensive assistant

Legend

- (C) Team captain
- (S) Suspended
- (I) Ineligible
- Injured
- Redshirt

Roster
Last update: 08/06/26

== Game summaries ==
=== vs. No. 9 Ole Miss ===
No. 24 Louisville Cardinals (0–0) vs. No. 9 Ole Miss Rebels (0–0) – Game summary

Quarter	1	2	3	4	Total
No. 24 Louisville	3	3	18	14	38
No. 9 Ole Miss	0	10	14	17	41

at Nissan Stadium • Nashville, Tennessee

- Date: September 6, 2026
- Game time: 7:30 p.m. EST
- Game weather: Sunny • Temperature: 88 °F (31 °C) • Wind: NE at 9 miles per hour (14 km/h)
- Game attendance: 57,390
- Referee: Cravonne Barrett
- TV announcers (ABC): Sean McDonough, Greg McElroy, and Katie George

Game information

First quarter

- (7:19) LOU – Carson Hilbert 25-yard field goal (Drive: 10 plays, 47 yards, 6:33; Louisville 3–0)

Second quarter

- (14:51) MISS – Lucas Carneiro 43-yard field goal (Drive: 11 plays, 60 yards, 3:34; Tied 3–3)
- (10:38) MISS – Kewan Lacy 1-yard run (Lucas Carneiro kick) (Drive: 4 plays, 12 yards, 1:13; Ole Miss 10–3)
- (0:06) LOU – Carson Hilbert 46-yard field goal (Drive: 8 plays, 42 yards, 1:37; Ole Miss 10–6)

Third quarter

- (10:51) LOU – Tre Richardson 30-yard run (Carson Hilbert kick) (Drive: 9 plays, 77 yards, 4:01; Louisville 13–10)
- (8:53) MISS – Deuce Alexander 62-yard pass from Trinidad Chambliss (Lucas Carneiro kick) (Drive: 5 plays, 62 yards, 1:58; Ole Miss 17–13)
- (2:22) LOU – Carson Hilbter 45-yard field goal (Drive: 6 plays, 51 yards, 2:25; Ole Miss 17–16)
- (1:01) MISS – Deuce Alexander 62-yard pass from Trinidad Chambliss (Lucas Carneiro kick) (Drive: 3 plays, 75 yards, 1:21; Ole Miss 24–16)
- (0:16) LOU – Tre Richardson 62-yard pass from Lincoln Kienholz (Lawayne McCoy pass from Lincoln Kienholz) (Drive: 2 plays, 85 yards, 0:41; Tied 24–24)

Fourth quarter

- (12:45) MISS – Caleb Odom 35-yard pass from Trinidad Chambliss (Lucas Carneiro kick) (Drive: 6 plays, 75 yards, 2:31; Ole Miss 31–24)
- (6:43) MISS – Trinidad Chambliss 5-yard run (Lucas Carneiro kick), (Drive: 9 plays, 54 yards, 3:51; Ole Miss 38–24)
- (4:42) LOU – Lawayne McCoy 54-yard pass from Lincoln Kienholz (Carson Hilbert kick), (Drive: 6 plays, 35 yards, 2:01; Ole Miss 38–31)
- (1:28) LOU – Lincoln Kienholz 7-yard run (Carson Hilbert kick), (Drive: 7 plays, 77 yards, 1:41; Tied 38–38)
- (0:00) MISS – Lucas Carneiro 48-yard field goal (Drive: 8 plays, 40 yards, 1:28; Ole Miss 41–38)

Statistics	LOU	MISS
First downs	20	24
Total yards	469	488
Rushes–yards	39–162	41–152
Passing yards	307	336
Passing: comp–att–int	18–29–0	21–37–1
Turnovers	0	2
Time of possession	30:58	29:02

Team	Category	Player	Statistics
Louisville	Passing	Lincoln Kienholz	18/29, 307 yards, 2 TD
Louisville	Rushing	Lincoln Kienholz	14 carries, 69 yards, TD
Louisville	Receiving	Tre Richardson	4 receptions, 83 yards, TD
Ole Miss	Passing	Trinidad Chambliss	21/37, 336 yards, 3 TD, INT
Ole Miss	Rushing	Kewan Lacy	17 carries, 61 yards, TD
Ole Miss	Receiving	Deuce Alexander	5 receptions, 159 yards, 2 TD

=== vs. No. 21 (FCS) Villanova ===
No. 21 (FCS) Villanova Wilcats (1–1) at No. 24 Louisville Cardinals (0–1) – Game summary

Quarter	1	2	3	4	Total
No. 21 (FCS) Villanova	3	7	3	0	13
No. 24 Louisville	17	14	14	14	59

at L&N Federal Credit Union Stadium • Louisville, Kentucky

- Date: September 11, 2026
- Game time: 7:00 p.m. EST
- Game weather: Sunny • Temperature: 79 °F (26 °C) • Wind: SW at 7 miles per hour (11 km/h)
- Game attendance: 46,385
- Referee: Mike Roche
- TV announcers (ACCN): Cooper Boardman, Charles Arbuckle, and Ashley Stroehlein

Game information

First quarter

- (12:16) LOU – Carson Hilbert 33-yard field goal (Drive: 7 plays, 35 yards, 2:35; Louisville 3–0)
- (6:24) VILL – Dominic LeBlanc 35-yard field goal (Drive: 12 plays, 58 yards, 5:52; Tied 3–3)
- (4:33) LOU – Lincoln Kienholz 19-yard run (Carson Hilbert kick) (Drive: 4 plays, 72 yards, 1:44; Louisville 10–3)
- (0:14) LOU – Jaleel Skinner 69-yard pass from Lincoln Kienholz (Carson Hilbert kick) (Drive: 5 plays, 82 yards, 2:09; Louisville 17–3)

Second quarter

- (14:50) VILL – Ja'briel Mace 65-yard pass from Pat McQuaide (Dominic LeBlanc kick) (Drive: 2 plays, 75 yards, 0:29; Louisville 17–10)
- (13:24) LOU – Lawayne McCoy 61-yard pass from Lincoln Kienholz (Carson Hilbert kick) (Drive: 2 plays, 80 yards, 1:16; Louisville 24–10)
- (1:53) LOU – Lincoln Kienholz 4-yard run (Carson Hilbert kick) (Drive: 10 plays, 85 yards, 3:39; Louisville 31–10)

Third quarter

- (7:50) LOU – Braxton Jennings 15-yard run (Carson Hilbert kick) (Drive: 4 plays, 52 yards, 2:03; Louisville 38–10)
- (3:42) VILL – Dominic LeBlanc 29-yard field goal (Drive: 13 plays, 63 yards, 4:08; Louisville 38–13)
- (0:07) LOU – Marquise Davis 3-yard run (Garth White kick) (Drive: 8 plays, 59 yards, 3:29; Louisville 45–13)

Fourth quarter

- (12:36) LOU – Braxton Jennings 2-yard pass from Davin Wydner (Garth White kick) (Drive: 5 plays, 16 yards, 2:17; Louisville 52–13)
- (7:04) LOU – Marquise Davis 4-yard run (Garth White kick) (Drive: 6 plays, 65 yards, 2:21; Louisville 59–13)

Statistics	VILL	LOU
First downs	15	29
Total yards	253	635
Rushes–yards	28–75	38–260
Passing yards	178	375
Passing: comp–att–int	20–34–0	21–28–0
Turnovers	1	0
Time of possession	30:51	29:09

Team	Category	Player	Statistics
Villanova	Passing	Pat McQuaide	18/31, 166 yards, TD
Villanova	Rushing	Isaiah Ragland	9 carries, 34 yards
Villanova	Receiving	Ja'briel Mace	3 receptions, 73 yards, TD
Louisville	Passing	Lincoln Kienholz	16/21, 332 yards, 2 TD
Louisville	Rushing	Marquise Davis	7 carries, 86 yards, 2 TD
Louisville	Receiving	Lawayne McCoy	3 receptions, 102 yards, TD

=== vs. No. 16 SMU ===
No. 23 Louisville Cardinals (1–1) vs. No. 16 SMU Mustangs (2–0) – Game summary

Quarter	1	2	3	4	Total
No. 16 SMU	7	10	7	7	31
No. 23 Louisville	14	0	14	13	41

at L&N Federal Credit Union Stadium • Louisville, Kentucky

- Date: September 19, 2026
- Game time: 3:30 p.m. EST
- Game weather: Sunny • Temperature: 95 °F (35 °C) • Wind: NW at 8 miles per hour (13 km/h)
- Game attendance: 50,199
- Referee: Justin Elliott
- TV announcers (ESPN2): Roy Philpott, Brock Osweiler, and Sherree Burress

Game information

First quarter

- (11:35) SMU – Kendrick Raphael 2-yard run (Nick Reed kick) (Drive: 8 plays, 75 yards, 3:25; SMU 7–0)
- (5:19) LOU – Lincoln Kienholz 1-yard run (Carson Hilbert kick) (Drive: 12 plays, 75 yards, 6:16; Tied 7–7)
- (1:38) LOU – Lawayne McCoy 33-yard pass from Lincoln Kienholz (Carson Hilbert kick) (Drive: 4 plays, 30 yards, 2:03; Louisville 14–7)

Second quarter

- (13:12) SMU – Yamir Knight 19-yard pass from Kevin Jennings (Nick Reed kick) (Drive: 7 plays, 35 yards, 3:26; Tied 14–14)
- (0:00) SMU – Nick Reed 46-yard field goal (Drive: 5 plays, 10 yards, 1:14; SMU 17–14)

Third quarter

- (14:17) LOU – Keyjuan Brown 58-yard run (Carson Hilbert kick) (Drive: 2 plays, 75 yards, 0:43; Louisville 21–17)
- (6:12) SMU – Kendrick Raphael 25-yard run (Nick Reed kick) (Drive: 11 plays, 86 yards, 4:15; SMU 24–21)
- (2:41) LOU – Jaleel Skinner 4-yard pass from Lincoln Kienholz (Carson Hilbert kick) (Drive: 9 plays, 75 yards, 3:31; Louisville 28–24)

Fourth quarter

- (11:33) SMU – Kendrick Raphael 12-yard run (Nick Reed kick) (Drive: 8 plays, 52 yards, 2:34; SMU 31–28)
- (10:02) LOU – Keyjuan Brown 53-yard run (Carson Hilbert kick) (Drive: 4 plays, 75 yards, 1:31; Louisville 35–31)
- (5:32) LOU – Isaac Brown 27-yard run (Carson Hilbert kick failed) (Drive: 3 plays, 64 yards, 1:53; Louisville 41–31)

Statistics	SMU	LOU
First downs	27	22
Total yards	479	442
Rushes–yards	45–257	37–265
Passing yards	222	177
Passing: comp–att–int	24–35–2	14–23–0
Turnovers	3	0
Time of possession	31:56	28:04

Team	Category	Player	Statistics
SMU	Passing	Kevin Jennings	24–35, 222 yards, TD, 2 INT
SMU	Rushing	Kendrick Raphael	24 carries, 197 yards, 3 TD
SMU	Receiving	Yamir Knight	7 receptions, 70 yards, TD
Louisville	Passing	Lincoln Kienholz	14–23, 177 yards, 2 TD
Louisville	Rushing	Keyjuan Brown	10 carries, 162 yards, 2 TD
Louisville	Receiving	Lawayne McCoy	4 receptions, 62 yards, TD

=== vs. Wake Forest ===
No. 16 Louisville Cardinals (2–1) vs. Wake Forest Demon Deacons (2–1) – Game summary

Quarter	1	2	3	4	Total
Wake Forest	3	21	3	3	30
No. 16 Louisville	7	14	6	0	27

at L&N Federal Credit Union Stadium • Louisville, Kentucky

- Date: September 26, 2026
- Game time: 12:00 p.m. EST
- Game weather: Sunny • Temperature: 72 °F (22 °C) • Wind: NE at 7 miles per hour (11 km/h)
- Game attendance: 46,042
- Referee: Tim Hedgepeth
- TV announcers (ESPN): Tom Hart, Roddy Jones, and Quint Kessenich

Game information

First quarter

- (6:18) WF – Connor Calvert 39-yard field goal (Drive: 6 plays, 38 yards, 2:33; Wake Forest 3–0)
- (0:21) LOU – Lincoln Kienholz 5-yard run (Carson Hilbert kick) (Drive: 11 plays, 75 yards, 5:57; Louisville 7–3)

Second quarter

- (13:34) WF – Ty Clark III 6-yard run (Connor Calvert kick) (Drive: 7 plays, 75 yards, 1:47; Wake Forest 10–7)
- (7:32) LOU – Lincoln Kienholz 6-yard run (Carson Hilbert kick) (Drive: 11 plays, 75 yards, 6:02; Louisville 14–10)
- (5:49) WF – Carlos Hernandez 77-yard pass from Gio Lopez (Connor Calvert kick) (Drive: 4 plays, 88 yards, 1:38; Wake Forest 17–14)
- (1:19) WF – Ty Clark III 6-yard run (Connor Calvert kick) (Drive: 5 plays, 65 yards, 2:27; Wake Forest 24–14)
- (0:57) LOU – Jaleel Skinner 61-yard pass from Lincoln Kienholz (Carson Hilbert kick) (Drive: 3 plays, 75 yards, 0:22; Wake Forest 24–21)

Third quarter

- (9:37) LOU – Carson Hilbert 41-yard field goal (Drive: 8 plays, 42 yards, 3:59; Tied 24–24)
- (4:58) WF – Connor Calvert 35-yard field goal (Drive: 12 plays, 58 yards, 4:39; Wake Forest 27–24)
- (0:42) LOU – Carson Hilbert 54-yard field goal (Drive: 9 plays, 38 yards, 4:16; Tied 27–27)

Fourth quarter

- (6:20) WF – Connor Calvert 32-yard field goal (Drive: 11 plays, 48 yards, 6:35; Wake Forest 30–27)

Statistics	WF	LOU
First downs	20	24
Total yards	402	399
Rushes–yards	42–177	38–75
Passing yards	225	324
Passing: comp–att–int	12–19–0	27–36–1
Turnovers	1	1
Time of possession	26:26	33:34

Team	Category	Player	Statistics
Wake Forest	Passing	Gio Lopez	12–19, 225 yards, TD
Wake Forest	Rushing	Ty Clark III	21 carries, 91 yards, 2 TD
Wake Forest	Receiving	Carlos Hernandez	9 receptions, 194 yards, TD
Louisville	Passing	Lincoln Kienholz	27–36, 324 yards, TD, INT
Louisville	Rushing	Keyjuan Brown	12 carries, 48 yards
Louisville	Receiving	Tre Richardson	5 receptions, 85 yards

=== at NC State ===
Louisville Cardinals (2–2) at NC State Wolfpack (2–2) – Game summary

Quarter	1	2	3	4	Total
Louisville	0	7	14	7	28
NC State	3	10	15	3	31

at Carter–Finley Stadium • Raleigh, North Carolina

- Date: October 3, 2026
- Game time: 3:30 p.m. EST
- Game attendance: 56,919
- TV announcers (ACCN): Justin Kutcher, Max Browne, and Madison Fitzpatrick

Game information

First quarter
Second quarter
Third quarter
Fourth quarter

Statistics	LOU	NCSU
First downs		
Total yards		
Rushes–yards		
Passing yards		
Passing: comp–att–int		
Turnovers		
Time of possession		

Team	Category	Player	Statistics
Louisville	Passing		
Louisville	Rushing		
Louisville	Receiving		
NC State	Passing		
NC State	Rushing		
NC State	Receiving		

=== vs. Florida State ===
Louisville Cardinals (2–3) vs. Florida State Seminoles (3–2) – Game summary

Quarter	1	2	3	4	Total
Florida State	14	0	0	6	20
Louisville	0	14	14	16	44

at L&N Federal Credit Union Stadium • Louisville, Kentucky

- Date: October 9, 2026
- Game time: 7:00 p.m. EST
- Game weather: Sunny • Temperature: 78 °F (26 °C) • Wind: SE at 7 miles per hour (11 km/h)
- Game attendance: 48,992
- Referee: Jon Noli
- TV announcers (ESPN): Mike Monaco, Jordan Rodgers, and Dana Boyle

Game information

First quarter

- (8:34) FSU – Ashton Daniels 7-yard run (Gabe Panikowski kick) (Drive: 14 plays, 75 yards, 6:26; Florida State 7–0)
- (2:08) FSU – Micahi Danzy 25-yard pass from Ashton Daniels (Gabe Panikowski kick) (Drive: 8 plays, 55 yards, 2:35; Florida State 14–0)

Second quarter

- (9:16) LOU – Isaac Brown 97-yard run (Carson Hilbert kick) (Drive: 1 play, 97 yards, 0:12; Florida State 14–7)
- (3:21) LOU – Maurice Davis 3-yard run (Carson Hilbert kick) (Drive: 7 plays, 59 yards, 3:49; Tied 14–14)

Third quarter

- (12:45) LOU – Lincoln Kienholz 3-yard run (Carson Hilbert kick) (Drive: 4 plays, 14 yards, 2:03; Louisville 21–14)
- (8:06) LOU – Lincoln Kienholz 1-yard run (Carson Hilbert kick) (Drive: 8 plays, 76 yards, 3:52; Louisville 28–14)

Fourth quarter

- (12:57) LOU – Braxton Jennings 44-yard run (Carson Hilbert kick) (Drive: 6 plays, 85 yards, 2:43; Louisville 35–14)
- (8:30) FSU – Micahi Danzy 2-yard pass from Ashton Daniels (Two-point pass conversion failed) (Drive: 10 plays, 79 yards, 4:20; Louisville 35–20)
- (7:37) LOU – Isaac Brown 68-yard run (Carson Hilbert PAT failed) (Drive: 2 plays, 75 yards, 0:53; Louisville 41–20)
- (2:59) LOU – Carson Hilbert 39-yard field goal (Drive: 7 plays, 24 yards, 2:28; Louisville 44–20)

Statistics	FSU	LOU
First downs	22	21
Total yards	362	537
Rushes–yards	39–153	43–397
Passing yards	209	140
Passing: comp–att–int	21–38–1	11–15–0
Turnovers	1	0
Time of possession	31:18	28:42

Team	Category	Player	Statistics
Florida State	Passing	Ashton Daniels	21–37, 209 yards, 2 TD, INT
Florida State	Rushing	Ousmane Kromah	19 carries, 88 yards
Florida State	Receiving	Micahi Danzy	4 receptions, 50 yards, 2 TD
Louisville	Passing	Lincoln Kienholz	11–15, 140 yards
Louisville	Rushing	Isaac Brown	17 carries, 235 yards, 2 TD
Louisville	Receiving	Lawayne McCoy	3 receptions, 78 yards

=== at Syracuse ===
Louisville Cardinals (3–3) at Syracuse Orange (2–3) – Game summary

Quarter	1	2	3	4	Total
Louisville	14	14	0	6	34
Syracuse	10	13	0	3	26

at JMA Wireless Dome • Syracuse, New York

- Date: October 17, 2026
- Game time: 7:30 p.m. EST
- Game weather: none (played indoors)
- Game attendance: 39,293
- Referee: Riley Johnson
- TV announcers (ACCN): Jorge Sedano, Rodney McLeod, and Anabella Hasselbeck

Game information

First quarter

- (11:49) SYR – Shay Barker 26-yard field goal (Drive: 5 plays, 66 yards, 2:08; Syracuse 3–0)
- (8:40) SYR – Umari Hatcher 41-yard pass from Malachi Nelson (Shay Barker kick) (Drive: 3 plays, 43 yards, 0:44; Syracuse 10–0)
- (6:01) LOU – Keyjuan Brown 5-yard run (Carson Hilbert kick) (Drive: 5 plays, 89 yards, 2:34; Syracuse 10–7)
- (2:19) LOU – Lincoln Kienholz 82-yard run (Carson Hilbert kick) (Drive: 3 plays, 90 yards, 1:10; Louisville 14–10)

Second quarter

- (14:55) SYR – Calvin Russell III 24-yard pass from Malachi Nelson (Shay Barker PAT failed) (Drive: 6 plays, 75 yards, 2:24; Syracuse 16–14)
- (9:29) LOU – Lincoln Kienholz 1-yard run (Carson Hilbert kick) (Drive: 10 plays, 94 yards, 5:20; Louisville 21–16)
- (2:55) SYR – Ahmad Miller 20-yard run (Shay Barker kick) (Drive: 15 plays, 88 yards, 6:34; Syracuse 23–21)
- (0:28) LOU – Isaac Brown 46-yard pass from Lincoln Kienholz (Carson Hilbert kick) (Drive: 8 plays, 75 yards, 2:27; Louisville 28–23)

Third quarter

- No scoring plays

Fourth quarter

- (12:45) SYR – Shay Barker 24-yard field goal (Drive: 9 plays, 47 yards, 2:59; Louisville 28–26)
- (7:34) LOU – Keyjuan Brown 5-yard run (Carson Hilbert PAT failed) (Drive: 5 plays, 56 yards, 2:42; Louisville 34–26)

Statistics	LOU	SYR
First downs	15	26
Total yards	425	462
Rushes–yards	35–115	39–123
Passing yards	310	339
Passing: comp–att–int	14–26–2	29–44–2
Turnovers	2	3
Time of possession	27:36	32:24

Team	Category	Player	Statistics
Louisville	Passing	Lincoln Kienholz	14–26, 310 yards, TD, 2 INT
Louisville	Rushing	Lincoln Kienholz	10 carries, 53 yards, 2 TD
Louisville	Receiving	Lawayne McCoy	5 receptions, 93 yards
Syracuse	Passing	Malachi Nelson	26–39, 315 yards, 2 TD, 2 INT
Syracuse	Rushing	Ahmad Miller	18 carries, 123 yards, TD
Syracuse	Receiving	Umari Hatcher	13 receptions, 224 yards, TD

=== vs. Stanford ===
Louisville Cardinals (4–3) vs. Stanford Cardinal (4–4) – Game summary

Quarter	1	2	3	4	Total
Stanford	0	17	7	0	24
Louisville	7	17	21	7	52

at L&N Federal Credit Union Stadium • Louisville, Kentucky

- Date: October 31, 2026
- Game time: 3:15 p.m. EST
- Game weather: Cloudy • Temperature: 66 °F (19 °C) • Wind: SE at 5 miles per hour (8.0 km/h)
- Game attendance: 44,308
- Referee: Jon Noli
- TV announcers (ACCN): Jorge Sedano, Rodney McLeod, and Anabella Hasselbeck

Game information

First quarter

- (11:25) LOU – Isaac Brown 5-yard run (Carson Hilbert kick) (Drive: 7 plays, 80 yards, 3:27; Louisville 7–0)

Second quarter

- (13:35) STAN – Emmet Kenney 48-yard field goal (Drive: 8 plays, 32 yards, 3:33; Louisville 7–3)
- (10:41) STAN – Nico Brown 41-yard pass from Davis Warren (Emmet Kenney kick) (Drive: 2 plays, 50 yards, 0:34; Stanford 10–7)
- (5:26) LOU – Lincoln Kienholz 1-yard run (Carson Hilbert kick) (Drive: 9 plays, 60 yards, 5:15; Louisville 14–10)
- (5:16) STAN – Aiden Black 75-yard pass from Davis Warren (Emmet Kenney kick) (Drive: 1 play, 75 yards, 0:10; Stanford 17–14)
- (1:46) LOU – Carson Hilbert 35-yard field goal (Drive: 9 plays, 58 yards, 3:30; Tied 17–17)
- (0:15) LOU – TreyShun Hurry 22-yard pass from Lincoln Kienholz (Carson Hilbert kick) (Drive: 5 plays, 41 yards, 0:40; Louisville 24–17)

Third quarter

- (12:46) STAN – Micah Ford 40-yard pass from Davis Warren (Emmet Kenney kick) (Drive: 6 plays, 75 yards, 2:14; Tied 24–24)
- (10:57) LOU – Isaac Brown 18-yard pass from Lincoln Kienholz (Carson Hilbert kick) (Drive: 5 plays, 75 yards, 1:49; Louisville 31–24)
- (3:34) LOU – Tayon Holloway 31-yard fumble return (Carson Hilbert kick) (Louisville 38–24)
- (0:27) LOU – Isaac Brown 23-yard run (Carson Hilbert kick) (Drive: 3 plays, 53 yards, 1:28; Louisville 45–24)

Fourth quarter

- (10:01) LOU – Isaac Brown 75-yard run (Carson Hilbert kick) (Drive: 1 play, 75 yards, 0:12; Louisville 52–24)

Statistics	STAN	LOU
First downs	15	22
Total yards	351	545
Rushes–yards	31–81	33–296
Passing yards	270	249
Passing: comp–att–int	23–38–1	21–29–0
Turnovers	2	1
Time of possession	30:42	29:18

Team	Category	Player	Statistics
Stanford	Passing	Davis Warren	23–37, 270 yards, 3 TD, INT
Stanford	Rushing	Micah Ford	20 carries, 72 yards
Stanford	Receiving	Nico Brown	6 receptions, 109 yards, TD
Louisville	Passing	Lincoln Kienholz	20–28, 250 yards, 2 TD
Louisville	Rushing	Isaac Brown	9 carries, 139 yards, 3 TD
Louisville	Receiving	Tre Richardson	10 receptions, 140 yards

=== at Georgia Tech ===
Louisville Cardinals (5–3) at Georgia Tech Yellow Jackets (2–6) – Game summary

Quarter	1	2	3	4	Total
Louisville	10	17	10	7	44
Georgia Tech	3	7	0	7	17

at Bobby Dodd Stadium • Atlanta, Georgia

- Date: November 6, 2026
- Game time: 7:30 p.m. EST
- Game weather: Sunny • Temperature: 56 °F (13 °C)
- Game attendance: 44,680
- Referee: Jerry Magallanes
- TV announcers (ACCN): Wes Durham, Max Browne, and Madison Fitzpatrick

Game information

First quarter

- (11:06) LOU – Carson Hilbert 42-yard field goal (Drive: 8 plays, 50 yards, 3:54; Louisville 3–0)
- (6:19) GT – Aiden Birr 32-yard field goal (Drive: 9 plays, 40 yards, 2:49; Tied 3–3)
- (3:26) LOU – Tre Richardson 8-yard pass from Lincoln Kienholz (Carson Hilbert kick) (Drive: 5 plays, 75 yards, 2:53; Louisville 10–3)

Second quarter

- (12:31) LOU – TreyShun Hurry 4-yard pass from Lincoln Kienholz (Carson Hilbert kick) (Drive: 8 plays, 64 yards, 4:18; Louisville 17–3)
- (10:00) LOU – Tre Richardson 52-yard run (Carson Hilbert kick) (Drive: 3 plays, 69 yards, 1:21; Louisville 24–3)
- (0:56) LOU – Carson Hilbert 23-yard field goal (Drive: 13 plays, 68 yards, 4:02; Louisville 27–3)
- (0:10) GT – Isaiah Fuhrmann 10-yard pass from Alberto Mendoza (Aiden Birr kick) (Drive: 7 plays, 75 yards, 0:46; Louisville 27–10)

Third quarter

- (7:17) LOU – Carson Hilbert 29-yard field goal (Drive: 9 plays, 44 yards, 4:40; Louisville 30–10)
- (5:42) LOU – Isaac Brown 11-yard run (Carson Hilbert kick) (Drive: 2 plays, 19 yards, 0:28; Louisville 37–10)

Fourth quarter

- (4:15) GT – Chris Corbo 11-yard pass from Grady Adamson (Aiden Birr kick) (Drive: 9 plays, 98 yards, 2:58; Louisville 37–17)
- (1:56) LOU – Braxton Jennings 2-yard run (Carson Hilbert kick) (Drive: 6 plays, 43 yards, 2:18; Louisville 44–17)

Statistics	LOU	GT
First downs	22	23
Total yards	456	350
Rushes–yards	36–251	32–109
Passing yards	205	241
Passing: comp–att–int	18–26–0	25–45–1
Turnovers	1	1
Time of possession	30:15	29:45

Team	Category	Player	Statistics
Louisville	Passing	Lincoln Kienholz	17–25, 182 yards, 2 TD
Louisville	Rushing	Lincoln Kienholz	9 carries, 81 yards
Louisville	Receiving	TreyShun Hurry	8 receptions, 104 yards, TD
Georgia Tech	Passing	Alberto Mendoza	13–25, 148 yards, TD
Georgia Tech	Rushing	Justice Haynes	12 carries, 87 yards
Georgia Tech	Receiving	Dalen Penson	5 receptions, 66 yards

=== at North Carolina ===
Louisville Cardinals (6–3) at North Carolina Tar Heels (5–4) – Game summary

Quarter	1	2	3	4	Total
Louisville	3	10	0	3	16
North Carolina	7	0	0	7	14

at Kenan Memorial Stadium • Chapel Hill, North Carolina

- Date: November 14, 2026
- Game time: 7:00 p.m. EST
- Game weather: Clear • Temperature: 44 °F (7 °C) • Wind: NW at 6 miles per hour (9.7 km/h)
- Game attendance: 44,664
- Referee: Garrett Dickerson
- TV announcers (ESPN2): Mike Couzens, Tom Luginbill, and Lauren Sisler

Game information

First quarter

- (10:21) LOU – Carson Hilbert 46-yard field goal (Drive: 10 plays, 46 yards, 4:39; Louisville 3–0)
- (4:54) UNC – Benjamin Hall 11-yard run (Rece Verhoff kick) (Drive: 12 plays, 75 yards, 5:27; North Carolina 7–3)

Second quarter

- (14:16) LOU – Carson Hilbert 32-yard field goal (Drive: 10 plays, 60 yards, 5:38; North Carolina 7–6)
- (12:15) LOU – Jaleel Skinner 3-yard pass from Lincoln Kienholz (Carson Hilbert kick) (Drive: 4 plays, 21 yards, 1:55; Louisville 13–7)

Third quarter

- No scoring plays

Fourth quarter

- (7:28) LOU – Carson Hilbert 36-yard field goal (Drive: 10 plays, 60 yards, 5:19; Louisville 16–7)
- (3:43) UNC – Benjamin Hall 6-yard run (Rece Verhoff kick) (Drive: 9 plays, 75 yards, 3:45; Louisville 16–14)

Statistics	LOU	UNC
First downs	19	17
Total yards	302	293
Rushes–yards	33–148	33–114
Passing yards	154	179
Passing: comp–att–int	23–31–0	16–25–1
Turnovers	0	2
Time of possession	31:57	28:03

Team	Category	Player	Statistics
Louisville	Passing	Lincoln Kienholz	23–31, 154 yards, TD
Louisville	Rushing	Keyjuan Brown	11 carries, 78 yards
Louisville	Receiving	Lawayne McCoy	6 receptions, 64 yards
North Carolina	Passing	Billy Edwards Jr.	10–14, 120 yards
North Carolina	Rushing	Benjamin Hall	10 carries, 48 yards, 2 TD
North Carolina	Receiving	Jelani Thurman	5 receptions, 72 yards

=== vs. Pittsburgh ===
No. 23 Louisville Cardinals (7–3) vs. Pittsburgh Panthers (6–4) – Game summary

Quarter	1	2	3	4	Total
Pittsburgh	0	10	0	0	10
No. 23 Louisville	7	7	14	14	42

at L&N Federal Credit Union Stadium • Louisville, Kentucky

- Date: November 21, 2026
- Game time: 7:30 p.m. EST
- Game weather: Clear • Temperature: 59 °F (15 °C) • Wind: SE at 2 miles per hour (3.2 km/h)
- Game attendance: 45,892
- Referee: Justin Elliott
- TV announcers (ESPN2): Jay Alter, Tom Luginbill, and Lauren Sisler

Game information

First quarter

- (1:03) LOU – TreyShun Hurry 13-yard pass from Lincoln Kienholz (Carson Hilbert kick) (Drive: 5 plays, 34 yards, 1:55; Louisville 7–0)

Second quarter

- (9:22) PITT – Isaiah Neal 31-yard fumble return (Antonio Chadha kick) (Tied 7–7)
- (4:52) LOU – Lawayne McCoy 14-yard pass from Lincoln Kienholz (Carson Hilbert kick) (Drive: 4 plays, 29 yards, 0:55; Louisville 14–7)
- (0:00) PITT – Antoinio Chadha 57-yard field goal (Drive: 4 plays, -2 yards, 0:52; Louisville 14–10)

Third quarter

- (9:40) LOU – Tre Richardson 33-yard pass from Lincoln Kienholz (Carson Hilbert kick) (Drive: 6 plays, 56 yards, 2:57; Louisville 21–10)
- (5:13) LOU – Lawayne McCoy 23-yard pass from Lincoln Kienholz (Carson Hilbert kick) (Drive: 7 plays, 48 yards, 3:35; Louisville 28–10)

Fourth quarter

- (14:52) LOU – Tre Richardson 23-yard pass from Lincoln Kienholz (Carson Hilbert kick) (Drive: 5 plays, 64 yards, 2:14; Louisville 35–10)
- (3:19) LOU – Keyjuan Brown 1-yard run (Garth White kick) (Drive: 15 plays, 68 yards, 10:16; Louisville 42–10)

Statistics	PITT	LOU
First downs	8	25
Total yards	150	396
Rushes–yards	25–48	42–87
Passing yards	102	309
Passing: comp–att–int	15–28–2	25–41–1
Turnovers	4	2
Time of possession	20:58	39:02

Team	Category	Player	Statistics
Pittsburgh	Passing	Holden Geriner	12–20, 80 yards, 2 INT
Pittsburgh	Rushing	Damon Ferguson Jr.	11 carries, 46 yards
Pittsburgh	Receiving	Damon Ferguson Jr.	4 receptions, 32 yards
Louisville	Passing	Lincoln Kienholz	25–41, 309 yards, 5 TD, INT
Louisville	Rushing	Keyjuan Brown	18 carries, 73 yards, TD
Louisville	Receiving	Tre Richardson	8 receptions, 114 yards, 2 TD

=== at Kentucky (Governor's Cup) ===
Louisville Cardinals (8–3) at Kentucky Wildcats (7–4) – Game summary

Quarter	1	2	3	4	Total
Louisville	0	0	0	0	0
Kentucky	0	0	0	0	0

at Kroger Field • Lexington, Kentucky

- Date: November 28, 2026
- Game time: 12:00 p.m. EST
- TV: ESPN2

Game information

First quarter
Second quarter
Third quarter
Fourth quarter

Statistics	LOU	UK
First downs		
Total yards		
Rushes–yards		
Passing yards		
Passing: comp–att–int		
Turnovers		
Time of possession		

Team	Category	Player	Statistics
Louisville	Passing		
Louisville	Rushing		
Louisville	Receiving		
Kentucky	Passing		
Kentucky	Rushing		
Kentucky	Receiving		
