= 2026 Syracuse Orange football team =

American college football season

2026 Syracuse Orange football
- Conference: Atlantic Coast Conference
- Record: 5–6 (3–6 ACC)
- Head coach: Fran Brown (3rd season)
- Offensive coordinator: Jeff Nixon (3rd season)
- Co-offensive coordinator: Mike Johnson (5th season)
- Offensive scheme: Spread
- Defensive coordinator: Vince Kehres (1st season)
- Co-defensive coordinator: John Scott Jr. (1st season)
- Base defense: 4–2–5
- Home stadium: JMA Wireless Dome

Uniform
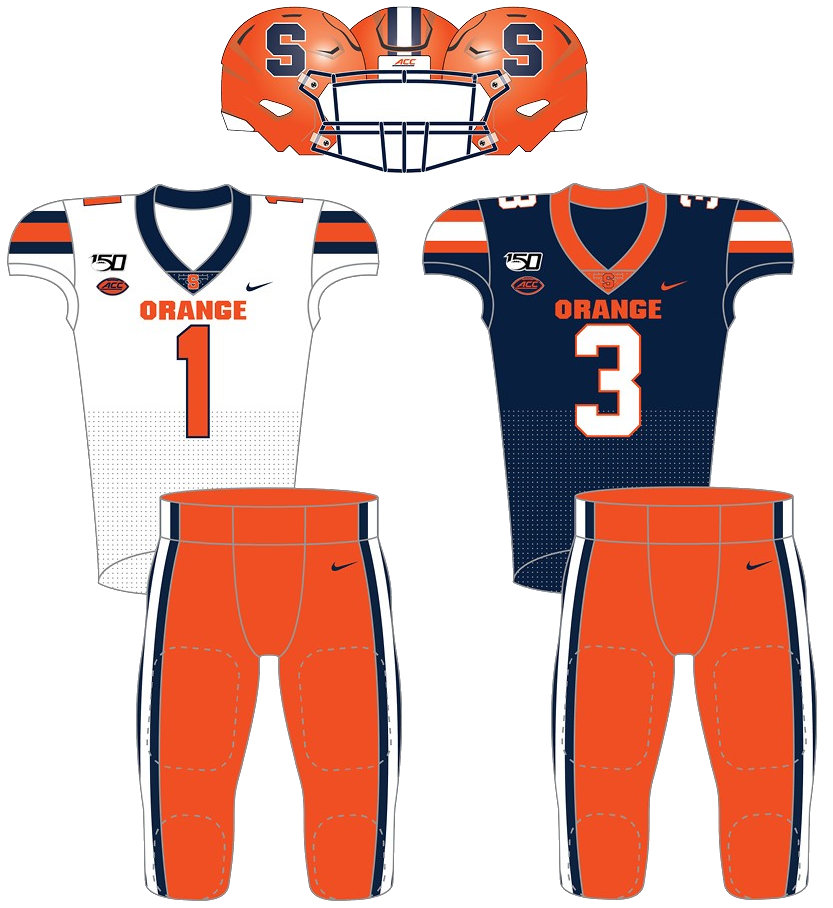

2026 Atlantic Coast Conference football standings
	Conf.			Overall
Team	W		L	W		L
No. 7 Miami (FL) y	8	–	0	10	–	1
No. 11 Wake Forest y	7	–	1	10	–	1
No. 23 Louisville	7	–	2	8	–	3
Clemson	5	–	3	7	–	4
SMU	5	–	3	7	–	4
Duke	4	–	4	7	–	4
Stanford	4	–	4	6	–	5
Virginia	4	–	4	6	–	5
Boston College	3	–	4	5	–	6
Pittsburgh	3	–	5	6	–	5
Virginia Tech	3	–	5	6	–	5
NC State	3	–	5	5	–	6
Florida State	3	–	5	5	–	6
Syracuse	3	–	6	5	–	6
North Carolina	2	–	5	5	–	6
California	2	–	6	3	–	8
Georgia Tech	2	–	6	3	–	8
Championship: Miami (FL) vs. Wake Forest
^ – College Football Playoff participant; $ – Conference champion; y – Championship game participant; As of November 22, 2026; Rankings from CFP rankings

The 2026 Syracuse Orange football team represents Syracuse University a member of the Atlantic Coast Conference (ACC) during the 2026 NCAA Division I FBS football season. The Orange play their home games at the JMA Wireless Dome located in Syracuse, New York. They are led by third-year head coach Fran Brown. The Orange are in their 125th season overall in the sport and their 14th as a member of the ACC.

== Offseason ==
=== Recruiting ===
Syracuse's 2026 class consisted of 27 signees. The class was ranked seventh in the ACC and 35th nationally by the 247Sports Composite.

=== Players leaving for NFL ===
==== Undrafted free agents ====
Player	Position	NFL club
Devin Grant	S	Los Angeles Chargers
Kevin Jobity Jr.	DL	Pittsburgh Steelers
Jack Stonehouse	P	Houston Texans
Dan Villari	TE	Los Angeles Rams
Da'Metrius Weatherspoon	OT	Buffalo Bills
Dion Wilson Jr.	DT	Baltimore Ravens

== Schedule ==
Date	Time	Opponent	Site	TV	Result	Attendance
September 5	12:00 p.m.	New Hampshire*	JMA Wireless Dome; Syracuse, NY	ACCN	W 66–3	33,257
September 12	3:30 p.m.	California	JMA Wireless Dome; Syracuse, NY	ACCN	L 18–21	36,031
September 17	7:30 p.m.	at Pittsburgh	Acrisure Stadium; Pittsburgh, PA (rivalry)	ESPN	L 13–27	42,087
October 3	12:00 p.m.	at UConn*	Pratt & Whitney Stadium at Rentschler Field; East Hartford, CT (rivalry)	CBSSN	W 42–41 ^{OT}	35,883
October 10	7:30 p.m.	at Virginia	Scott Stadium; Charlottesville, VA	ACCN	L 25–28	39,661
October 17	7:30 p.m.	Louisville	JMA Wireless Dome; Syracuse, NY	ACCN	L 26–34	39,293
October 24	3:30 p.m.	at North Carolina	Kenan Stadium; Chapel Hill, NC	ACCN	W 31–30 ^{OT}	50,500
October 31	12:00 p.m.	No. 19 SMU	JMA Wireless Dome; Syracuse, NY	ESPN2	W 30–27	33,396
November 7	12:00 p.m.	Clemson^{†}	JMA Wireless Dome; Syracuse, NY	ESPN2	L 13–18	37,291
November 14	12:00 p.m.	at NC State	Carter–Finley Stadium; Raleigh, NC	ACCN	W 34–31	53,948
November 21	12:00 p.m.	at Boston College	Alumni Stadium; Chestnut Hill, MA	ACCN	L 15–27	35,109
November 28	12:00 p.m.	Notre Dame*	JMA Wireless Dome; Syracuse, NY	ABC		
*Non-conference game; ^{†}Homecoming; Rankings from AP Poll (and CFP Rankings, after November 3) – Released prior to game; All times are in Eastern time

== Game summaries ==
=== vs. New Hampshire (FCS) ===
New Hampshire Wildcats (FCS) (0–1) at Syracuse Orange (0–0) – Game summary

Quarter	1	2	3	4	Total
Wildcats (FCS)	0	0	0	3	3
Orange	14	27	2	23	66

at JMA Wireless Dome • Syracuse, New York

- Date: September 5
- Game time: 12:00 p.m. EDT
- Game weather: none (played indoors)
- Game attendance: 33,257
- Referee: Nolan Dumas
- TV announcers (ACCN): Roxy Bernstein, Dave Clawson, and Madison Hock

Game information

First quarter

- SYR – Umari Hatcher 19-yard pass from Steve Angeli (Tripp Woody kick), 4:27. Orange 7–0. Drive: 9 plays, 77 yards, 3:51.
- SYR – Shavane Anderson Jr. 2-yard run (Tripp Woody kick), 1:35. Orange 14–0. Drive: 5 plays, 50 yards, 1:19.

Second quarter

- SYR – Tylik Hill 2-yard run (Tripp Woody kick), 9:31. Orange 21–0. Drive: 10 plays, 65 yards, 4:50.
- SYR – Shavane Anderson Jr. 15-yard run (Tripp Woody kick failed), 6:58. Orange 27–0. Drive: 2 plays, 40 yards, 0:34.
- SYR – David Clement 27-yard pass from Steve Angeli (Tripp Woody kick), 4:38. Orange 34–0. Drive: 2 plays, 21 yards, 0:22.
- SYR – Shavane Anderson Jr. 2-yard run (Tripp Woody kick), 1:42. Orange 41–0. Drive: 6 plays, 75 yards, 1:56.

Third quarter

- SYR – Team safety, 13:30. Orange 43–0.

Fourth quarter

- UNH – Lucas Glassburn 46-yard field goal, 14:50. Orange 43–3. Drive: 8 plays, 70 yards, 3:09.
- SYR – Umari Hatcher 18-yard pass from Steve Angeli (Tripp Woody kick), 13:16. Orange 50–3. Drive: 4 plays, 62 yards, 1:29.
- SYR – Zyian Moultrie-Goddard 26-yard fumble return (Tripp Woody kick), 11:53. Orange 57–3.
- SYR – Daunte Bacheyie 7-yard pass from Amari Odom (Tripp Woody kick failed), 8:52. Orange 63–3. Drive: 5 plays, 15 yards, 2:08.
- SYR – Tripp Woody 34-yard field goal, 0:48. Orange 66–3. Drive: 12 plays, 49 yards, 5:26.

Statistics	UNH	SYR
First downs	11	32
Plays–yards	58–154	77–514
Rushes–yards	34–56	43–238
Passing yards	99	275
Passing: comp–att–int	15–26–1	22–34–0
Turnovers	3	0
Time of possession	27:26	32:34

Team	Category	Player	Statistics
New Hampshire	Passing	Brooks Bentley	11/18, 75 yards, INT
New Hampshire	Rushing	Joquez Smith	8 carries, 60 yards
New Hampshire	Receiving	Myles Thomason	7 receptions, 53 yards
Syracuse	Passing	Steve Angeli	20/29, 263 yards, 3 TD
Syracuse	Rushing	Shavane Anderson Jr.	10 carries, 102 yards, 3 TD
Syracuse	Receiving	Umari Hatcher	8 receptions, 147 yards, 2 TD

=== vs. California ===
California Golden Bears (0–1) at Syracuse Orange (1–0) – Game summary

Quarter	1	2	3	4	Total
Golden Bears	0	7	7	7	21
Orange	3	9	6	0	18

at JMA Wireless Dome • Syracuse, New York

- Date: September 12
- Game time: 3:30 p.m. EDT
- Game weather: none (played indoors)
- Game attendance: 36,031
- Referee: Jon Noli
- TV announcers (ACCN): Jorge Sedano, Rodney McLeod Jr., and Kendra Douglas

Game information

First quarter

- SYR – Tripp Woody 25-yard field goal, 12:37. Orange 3–0. Drive: 6 plays, 57 yards, 2:17.

Second quarter

- SYR – Tripp Woody 33-yard field goal, 14:44. Orange 6–0. Drive: 12 plays, 45 yards, 4:14.
- SYR – Daunte Bacheyie 23-yard pass from Steve Angeli (run failed), 8:50. Orange 12–0. Drive: 5 plays, 72 yards, 2:26.
- CAL – Chase Hendricks 14-yard pass from Jaron-Keawe Sagapolutele (Towns McGough kick), 7:15. Orange 12–7. Drive: 4 plays, 75 yards, 1:35.

Third quarter

- CAL – Jordan King 2-yard pass from Jaron-Keawe Sagapolutele (Towns McGough kick), 7:15. Golden Bears 14–12. Drive: 6 plays, 29 yards, 3:07.
- SYR – Ju'Juan Johnson 2-yard run (run failed), 1:38. Orange 18–14. Drive: 13 plays, 75 yards, 5:37.

Fourth quarter

- CAL – Kingston Lopa 24-yard interception return (Towns McGough kick), 4:51. Golden Bears 21–18.

Statistics	CAL	SYR
First downs	16	27
Plays–yards	60–249	86–436
Rushes–yards	26–67	36–118
Passing yards	182	318
Passing: comp–att–int	21–34–0	25–50–3
Turnovers	0	3
Time of possession	25:50	34:10

Team	Category	Player	Statistics
California	Passing	Jaron-Keawe Sagapolutele	21/34, 182 yards, 2 TD
California	Rushing	Adam Mohammed	19 carries, 74 yards
California	Receiving	Ian Strong	3 receptions, 64 yards
Syracuse	Passing	Steve Angeli	24/49, 306 yards, TD, 3 INT
Syracuse	Rushing	Tylik Hill	2 carries, 56 yards
Syracuse	Receiving	Justus Ross-Simmons	6 receptions, 105 yards

=== at Pittsburgh (rivalry) ===
Syracuse Orange (1–1) at Pittsburgh Panthers (2–0) – Game summary

Quarter	1	2	3	4	Total
Orange	0	10	0	3	13
Panthers	7	10	7	3	27

at Acrisure Stadium • Pittsburgh, Pennsylvania

- Date: September 17
- Game time: 7:30 p.m. EDT
- Game weather: Cloudy • Temperature: 79 °F (26 °C) • Wind: W at 4 mph
- Game attendance: 42,087
- Referee: Tim Hedgepeth
- TV announcers (ESPN): Matt Barrie, Chase Daniel, and Paul Carcaterra

Statistics	SYR	PITT
First downs	23	22
Plays–yards	71–347	60–368
Rushes–yards	38–135	37–245
Passing yards	212	123
Passing: comp–att–int	21–33–2	10–23–1
Turnovers	2	1

Team	Category	Player	Statistics
Syracuse	Passing	Steve Angeli	13/25, 161 yards, 2 INT
Syracuse	Rushing	Ahmad Miller	14 carries, 78 yards, TD
Syracuse	Receiving	Umari Hatcher	3 receptions, 58 yards
Pittsburgh	Passing	Mason Heintschel	10/23, 123 yards, INT
Pittsburgh	Rushing	Damon Ferguson Jr.	10 carries, 102 yards, TD
Pittsburgh	Receiving	Carson Kent	2 receptions, 63 yards

=== at UConn (rivalry) ===
Syracuse Orange (1–2) at UConn Huskies (2–1) – Game summary

Quarter	1	2	3	4	OT	Total
Orange	6	21	7	0	8	42
Huskies	7	7	6	14	7	41

at Pratt & Whitney Stadium at Rentschler Field • East Hartford, Connecticut

- Date: October 3
- Game time: 12:00 p.m. EDT
- Game weather: Sunny • Temperature: 67 °F (19 °C) • Wind: NE at 8 miles per hour (13 km/h)
- Game attendance: 35,883
- Referee: Garrett Dickerson
- TV announcers (CBSSN): Jack Gordon, Taylor McHargue & Jaclyn DeAugustina

Game information

First quarter

- CUSE - Hatcher, Umari 40 yd pass from Odom, Amari (kick no good), 11:45. Orange 6–0. Drive: 7 plays, 70 yards, TOP 02:34
- CONN - Abshire, Cam 8 yd pass from Osborne, Kalieb (O'Connor, Jack kick), 9:31. Huskies 7–6. Drive: 7 plays, 75 yards, TOP 02:14

Second quarter

- CUSE - Meyers, Noah 4 yd pass from Odom, Amari (Barker, Shay kick), 13:39. Orange 13–7. Drive: 8 plays, 78 yards, TOP 04:04
- CUSE - Odom, Amari 6 yd run (Barker, Shay kick), 9:22. Orange 20–7. Drive: 5 plays, 47 yards, TOP 02:02
- CUSE - Hatcher, Umari 41 yd pass from Odom, Amari (Barker, Shay kick), 3:19. Orange 27–7. Drive: 7 plays, 79 yards, TOP 03:27
- CONN - Cornist, Trey 4 yd run (O'Connor, Jack kick), 0:11. Orange 27–14. Drive: 8 plays, 72 yards, TOP 01:34

Third quarter

- CUSE - Bacheyie, Daunte 34 yd pass from Odom, Amari (Barker, Shay kick), 7:58. Orange 34–14. Drive: 14 plays, 75 yards, TOP 07:02
- CONN - Bowers, Cyncir 10 yd run (kick no good), 3:46. Orange 34–20. Drive: 14 plays, 75 yards, TOP 04:12

Fourth quarter

- CONN - Watson, Xavier 7 yd pass from Osborne, Kalieb (O'Connor, Jack kick), 14:55. Orange 34–27. Drive: 3 plays, 43 yards, TOP 00:25
- CONN - Bowers, Cyncir 71 yd run (O'Connor, Jack kick), 11:52. Tied 34–34. Drive: 2 plays, 84 yards, TOP 00:34

First Overtime

- CONN - Cornist, Trey 25 yd pass from Osborne, Kalieb (O'Connor, Jack kick), 0:00. Huskies 41–34. Drive: 2 plays, 25 yards, TOP 00:00
- CUSE - Hatcher, Umari 17 yd pass from Odom, Amari (Odom, Amari rush), 0:00. Orange 42–41. Drive: 6 plays, 25 yards, TOP 00:00

Statistics	SYR	CONN
First downs	29	28
Plays–yards	85–509	74–499
Rushes–yards	48–174	34–181
Passing yards	335	318
Passing: comp–att–int	27–37–2	20–40–0
Time of possession	35:27	24:33

Team	Category	Player	Statistics
Syracuse	Passing	Amari Odom	27/37, 355 yards, 5 TD
Syracuse	Rushing	Tylik Hill	28 carries, 140 yards
Syracuse	Receiving	Umari Hatcher	12 receptions, 152 yards, 3 TD
UConn	Passing	Kalieb Osborne	19/39, 314 yards, 3 TD
UConn	Rushing	Cyncir Bowers	16 carries, 163 yards, 2 TD
UConn	Receiving	Ryder Treadway	3 receptions, 57 yards

=== at Virginia ===
Syracuse Orange (2–2) at Virginia Cavaliers (3–2) – Game summary

Quarter	1	2	3	4	Total
Orange	7	10	0	8	25
Cavaliers	7	0	7	14	28

at Scott Stadium • Charlottesville, Virginia

- Date: October 10
- Game time: 7:30 p.m. EDT
- Game attendance: 39,661
- TV announcers (ACCN): Jorge Sedano, Dave Clawson, and Madison Hock

Statistics	SYR	UVA
First downs	25	18
Plays–yards	82–430	55–288
Rushes–yards	47–163	35–169
Passing yards	267	119
Passing: comp–att–int	18–35–0	11–20–0
Time of possession	35:02	24:58

Team	Category	Player	Statistics
Syracuse	Passing	Malachi Nelson	16/29, 217 yards, TD
Syracuse	Rushing	Tylik Hill	23 carries, 118 yards
Syracuse	Receiving	Umari Hatcher	8 catches, 126 yards, TD
Virginia	Passing	Beau Pribula	11/19, 119 yards, TD
Virginia	Rushing	Jekail Middlebrook	17 carries, 95 yards, 2 TD
Virginia	Receiving	Da'Shawn Martin	2 catches, 48 yards, TD

=== vs. Louisville ===
Louisville Cardinals (3–3) at Syracuse Orange (2–3) – Game summary

Quarter	1	2	3	4	Total
Cardinals	14	14	0	6	34
Orange	10	13	0	3	26

at JMA Wireless Dome • Syracuse, New York

- Date: October 17
- Game time: 7:30 p.m. EDT
- Game weather: none (played indoors)
- Game attendance: 39,293
- Referee: Riley Johnson
- TV announcers (ACCN): Jorge Sedano, Rodney McLeod, and Anabella Hasselbeck

Game information

First quarter

- (11:49) SYR – Shay Barker 26-yard field goal (Drive: 5 plays, 66 yards, 2:08; Syracuse 3–0)
- (8:40) SYR – Umari Hatcher 41-yard pass from Malachi Nelson (Shay Barker kick) (Drive: 3 plays, 43 yards, 0:44; Syracuse 10–0)
- (6:01) LOU – Keyjuan Brown 5-yard run (Carson Hilbert kick) (Drive: 5 plays, 89 yards, 2:34; Syracuse 10–7)
- (2:19) LOU – Lincoln Kienholz 82-yard run (Carson Hilbert kick) (Drive: 3 plays, 90 yards, 1:10; Louisville 14–10)

Second quarter

- (14:55) SYR – Calvin Russell III 24-yard pass from Malachi Nelson (Shay Barker PAT failed) (Drive: 6 plays, 75 yards, 2:24; Syracuse 16–14)
- (9:29) LOU – Lincoln Kienholz 1-yard run (Carson Hilbert kick) (Drive: 10 plays, 94 yards, 5:20; Louisville 21–16)
- (2:55) SYR – Ahmad Miller 20-yard run (Shay Barker kick) (Drive: 15 plays, 88 yards, 6:34; Syracuse 23–21)
- (0:28) LOU – Isaac Brown 46-yard pass from Lincoln Kienholz (Carson Hilbert kick) (Drive: 8 plays, 75 yards, 2:27; Louisville 28–23)

Third quarter

- No scoring plays

Fourth quarter

- (12:45) SYR – Shay Barker 24-yard field goal (Drive: 9 plays, 47 yards, 2:59; Louisville 28–26)
- (7:34) LOU – Keyjuan Brown 5-yard run (Carson Hilbert PAT failed) (Drive: 5 plays, 56 yards, 2:42; Louisville 34–26)

Statistics	LOU	SYR
First downs	15	26
Total yards	425	462
Rushes–yards	35–115	39–123
Passing yards	310	339
Passing: comp–att–int	14–26–2	29–44–2
Turnovers	2	3
Time of possession	27:36	32:24

Team	Category	Player	Statistics
Louisville	Passing	Lincoln Kienholz	14–26, 310 yards, TD, 2 INT
Louisville	Rushing	Lincoln Kienholz	10 carries, 53 yards, 2 TD
Louisville	Receiving	Lawayne McCoy	5 receptions, 93 yards
Syracuse	Passing	Malachi Nelson	26–39, 315 yards, 2 TD, 2 INT
Syracuse	Rushing	Ahmad Miller	18 carries, 123 yards, TD
Syracuse	Receiving	Umari Hatcher	13 receptions, 224 yards, TD

=== at North Carolina ===
Syracuse Orange (2–4) at North Carolina Tar Heels (4–2) – Game summary

Quarter	1	2	3	4	OT	Total
Orange	0	10	0	13	8	31
Tar Heels	10	3	7	3	7	30

at Kenan Stadium • Chapel Hill, North Carolina

- Date: October 24
- Game time: 3:30 p.m. EDT
- Game attendance: 50,500
- TV announcers (ACCN): Justin Kutcher (play-by-play), Max Browne (analyst) and Madison Fitzpatrick (sideline)

Statistics	SYR	UNC
First downs	23	20
Total yards	455	372
Rushes–yards	49–199	25–101
Passing yards	256	271
Passing: comp–att–int	20–34–0	27–44–0
Turnovers	0	0
Time of possession	31:25	28:33

Team	Category	Player	Statistics
Syracuse	Passing	Steve Angeli	20–34, 256 yards, 2 TD
Syracuse	Rushing	Ahmad Miller	30 carries, 125 yards, TD
Syracuse	Receiving	Umari Hatcher	4 receptions, 103 yards, TD
North Carolina	Passing	Billy Edwards Jr.	27–44, 271 yards, 2 TD
North Carolina	Rushing	Jaylen McGill	12 carries, 62 yards
North Carolina	Receiving	Jordan Shipp	8 receptions, 102 yards, TD

=== vs. No. 19 SMU ===
No. 19 SMU Mustangs (6–1) at Syracuse Orange (3–4) – Game summary

Quarter	1	2	3	4	Total
No. 19 Mustangs	10	0	7	10	27
Orange	7	13	0	10	30

at JMA Wireless Dome • Syracuse, New York

- Date: October 31
- Game time: TBD
- TV announcers (ESPN2): Anish Shroff, Andre Ware, and Morgan Uber

Statistics	SMU	SYR
First downs		
Plays–yards		
Rushes–yards		
Passing yards		
Passing: comp–att–int		
Time of possession		

Team	Category	Player	Statistics
SMU	Passing		
SMU	Rushing		
SMU	Receiving		
Syracuse	Passing		
Syracuse	Rushing		
Syracuse	Receiving		

=== vs. Clemson ===
Clemson Tigers (5–3) at Syracuse Orange (4–4) – Game summary

Quarter	1	2	3	4	Total
Tigers	0	0	0	0	0
Orange	0	0	0	0	0

at JMA Wireless Dome • Syracuse, New York

- Date: November 7
- Game time: TBD

Statistics	CLEM	SYR
First downs		
Plays–yards		
Rushes–yards		
Passing yards		
Passing: comp–att–int		
Time of possession		

Team	Category	Player	Statistics
Clemson	Passing		
Clemson	Rushing		
Clemson	Receiving		
Syracuse	Passing		
Syracuse	Rushing		
Syracuse	Receiving		

=== at NC State ===
Syracuse Orange (4–5) at NC State Wolfpack (4–5) – Game summary

Quarter	1	2	3	4	Total
Orange	0	0	0	0	0
Wolfpack	0	0	0	0	0

at Carter–Finley Stadium • Raleigh, North Carolina

- Date: November 14
- Game time: TBD

Statistics	SYR	NCSU
First downs		
Plays–yards		
Rushes–yards		
Passing yards		
Passing: comp–att–int		
Time of possession		

Team	Category	Player	Statistics
Syracuse	Passing		
Syracuse	Rushing		
Syracuse	Receiving		
NC State	Passing		
NC State	Rushing		
NC State	Receiving		

=== at Boston College ===
Syracuse Orange (5–5) at Boston College Eagles (4–6) – Game summary

Quarter	1	2	3	4	Total
Orange	0	0	0	0	0
Eagles	0	0	0	0	0

at Alumni Stadium • Chestnut Hill, Massachusetts

- Date: November 21
- Game time: TBD

Statistics	SYR	BC
First downs		
Plays–yards		
Rushes–yards		
Passing yards		
Passing: comp–att–int		
Time of possession		

Team	Category	Player	Statistics
Syracuse	Passing		
Syracuse	Rushing		
Syracuse	Receiving		
Boston College	Passing		
Boston College	Rushing		
Boston College	Receiving		

=== vs. Notre Dame ===
Notre Dame Fighting Irish (10–1) at Syracuse Orange (5–6) – Game summary

Quarter	1	2	3	4	Total
Fighting Irish	0	0	0	0	0
Orange	0	0	0	0	0

at JMA Wireless Dome • Syracuse, New York

- Date: November 28
- Game time: TBD

Game information

First quarter
Second quarter
Third quarter
Fourth quarter

Statistics	ND	SYR
First downs		
Plays–yards		
Rushes–yards		
Passing yards		
Passing: comp–att–int		
Turnovers		
Time of possession		

Team	Category	Player	Statistics
Notre Dame	Passing		
Notre Dame	Rushing		
Notre Dame	Receiving		
Syracuse	Passing		
Syracuse	Rushing		
Syracuse	Receiving		

== Personnel ==
=== Roster and coaching staff ===
2026 Syracuse Orange football team roster
Players
Coaches
Offense

Pos.	#	Name	Class
TE	0	David Clement	Sr
WR	2	Umari Hatcher	Sr
RB	3	Davion Kerr	So
RB	4	Ju'Juan Johnson	Jr
WR	5	Calvin Russell III	Fr
WR	6	Darius Johnson	Fr
WR	7	Darien Williams	So
WR	8	Tyshawn Russell	Jr
QB	9	Steve Angeli	Sr
QB	10	Zaid Lott	Fr
WR	11	Cole Weaver	Jr
QB	12	Amari Odom	Jr
QB	13	Joseph Filardi	So
WR	13	Matthew Outten	Fr
WR	14	Zamondre Merriweather	Jr
WR	15	Amare' Gough	Fr
QB	16	Malachi Nelson	Jr
QB	17	Rich Belin	So
WR	17	Elijah Moore	So
TE	19	Daunte Bacheyie	So
RB	20	Tylik Hill	So
QB	21	Danny Lauter	Jr
RB	22	Ahmad Miller	Jr
RB	23	Shavane Anderson Jr.	Fr
RB	28	Malachi Coleman	Fr
OL	50	Kahlil Stewart	Fr
OL	53	Ted Olsen	Jr
OL	55	Zach Rice	Sr
OL	60	Naquil Betrand	Jr
OL	61	Joseph White	Fr
OL	62	Jackson Iak	Fr
OL	63	Brayden Charney	Fr
OL	64	Skylar Harvey	Fr
OL	65	Adam Boehiem	So
OL	67	D'Joni Scatliffe	Fr
OL	68	Vito Shevchenko	So
OL	69	Oluwafunto Akinshilo	Sr
OL	70	Kardiear Shepherd	Fr
OL	71	Jayden Mann	Fr
OL	74	Matthew Hawn	Fr
OL	75	Trevion Mack	Jr
OL	76	Byron Washington	So
OL	77	Kam Pringle	So
OL	78	Joe Cruz	Sr
OL	79	Travis Brown-Miller	So
TE	81	Noah Meyers	Jr
WR	83	Julian McFadden	Fr
TE	84	Elijah Washington-Baker	So
WR	86	Justus Ross-Simmons	Sr
TE	87	Wyatt Bowman	So
WR	87	Nate Edwards	So
WR	88	Terrell Wilfong	Fr

Defense

Pos.	#	Name	Class
DB	0	Braheem Long Jr.	Jr
DB, WR	1	Demetres Samuel Jr	So
LB	2	Zyian Moultrie-Goddard	Jr
DB	3	Davien Kerr	Jr
DB	4	Chase Geter	Fr
LB	5	Antoine Deslauriers	So
LB	6	Chris D'Appolonia	Jr
DB	7	Nazir Ward	Jr
DB	8	Tedarius Hughes	Fr
DB	9	Jai Eugene Jr.	Jr
LB	10	Gary Bryant III	Sr
DL	11	Nissi Ogbebor	So
DB	12	Chris Peal	Jr
DB	13	Amare Snowden	Jr
LB	14	Keyshawn Johnson	Sr
DL	15	Nathan Nyandoro	So
DL	16	Jarius Rodgers	Fr
DL	17	Kameron Wilson	Fr
LB	18	David Omopariola	Jr
DB	19	Cornell Perry	Sr
DB	20	Rayshon Andrews	Fr
DB	22	Ziyyon Bredell	So
LB	23	Trey Dudley	Fr
DB	24	Ibn-Wadu Muhammad	Fr
DB	26	Darnell Stokes Jr.	Fr
DB	27	Javon Lawrence	Fr
DL	30	Tunmise Adeleye	Sr
DB	31	Marcus Washington Jr.	Sr
LB	33	Gemaus Sackie	Fr
DB	34	Nate Prater	Sr
DB	38	James Trotter	Fr
DB	39	Bradley Chandler	Fr
LB	42	Maurice Medley	Fr
LB	43	Garvin St. John	So
DL	45	Clark Calloway	So
LB	49	Josh Kubala	Sr
DL	77	Jaylen Pray	Fr
LB	82	Jamie Tremble	Jr
DL	88	Elijah Crawford	Fr
DL	90	Kordae Houston	Fr
DL	92	Rashard Perry	Sr
DL	95	Dillan Fontus	Sr
DL	98	Jartavius Flounoy	So
DL	99	Isaiah Hastings	Sr

Special teams

Pos.	#	Name	Class
LS	21	Fran Brown Jr.	Jr
P	41	Jimmy Gregg	Fr
P	46	Mateja Pavlovich	Fr
K	47	Tripp Woody	So

Head coach

- Fran Brown

Coordinators/assistant coaches

- Vince Kehres – Defensive coordinator
- Jeff Nixon –Offensive coordinator/running backs
- Alex Bayer – Special teams coordinator
- Michael Johnson – Co-offensive coordinator/tight ends
- John Scott Jr. – Assistant head coach/co-defensive coordinator/defensive line
- Sean Ryan – Quarterbacks/passing game coordinator
- Juan Castillo – Offensive linemen
- Perry Eliano – Defensive backs
- Josh Gattis – Wide receivers
- Jeremy Hawkins – Edges
- Dennis Thomas – Running backs
- Marcus Walker – Nickels
- Dre Kates – Special assistant to the head coach
- Jeff Ambrosie – Assistant offensive line coach
- Dan Bolden – Defensive analyst (linebackers)
- Charlie Brewer – Offensive analyst (quarterbacks)
- Will Coale – Special teams quality control
- Mike Gillespie – Offensive quality control
- Ryan Krum – Offensive analyst (offensive line)
- Deon Maddox – Director of player development/alumni relations/offensive quality control
- Chris Mull – Defensive analyst (defensive line)
- Zach Van Arsdale – Offensive quality control
- Nitron Stork – Defensive analyst
- Brandon Napoleon – Assistant defensive backs coach

Legend

- (C) Team captain
- (S) Suspended
- (I) Ineligible
- Injured
- Redshirt

Roster
Last update: 5/25/26
