= 2026 Pittsburgh Panthers football team =

2026 Pittsburgh Panthers football
- Conference: Atlantic Coast Conference
- Record: 6–5 (3–5 ACC)
- Head coach: Pat Narduzzi (12th season)
- Offensive coordinator: Kade Bell (3rd season)
- Offensive scheme: Hurry-up, no-huddle spread
- Defensive coordinator: Cory Sanders (1st season)
- Base defense: 4–3
- Home stadium: Acrisure Stadium

Uniform
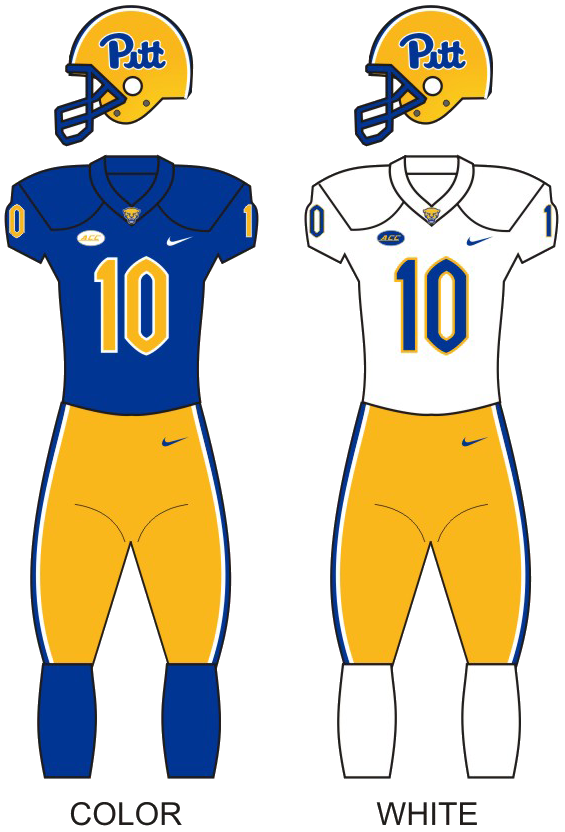

2026 Atlantic Coast Conference football standings
	Conf.			Overall
Team	W		L	W		L
No. 7 Miami (FL) y	8	–	0	10	–	1
No. 11 Wake Forest y	7	–	1	10	–	1
No. 23 Louisville	7	–	2	8	–	3
Clemson	5	–	3	7	–	4
SMU	5	–	3	7	–	4
Duke	4	–	4	7	–	4
Stanford	4	–	4	6	–	5
Virginia	4	–	4	6	–	5
Boston College	3	–	4	5	–	6
Pittsburgh	3	–	5	6	–	5
Virginia Tech	3	–	5	6	–	5
NC State	3	–	5	5	–	6
Florida State	3	–	5	5	–	6
Syracuse	3	–	6	5	–	6
North Carolina	2	–	5	5	–	6
California	2	–	6	3	–	8
Georgia Tech	2	–	6	3	–	8
Championship: Miami (FL) vs. Wake Forest
^ – College Football Playoff participant; $ – Conference champion; y – Championship game participant; As of November 22, 2026; Rankings from CFP rankings

The 2026 Pittsburgh Panthers football team represents the University of Pittsburgh as a member of the Atlantic Coast Conference (ACC) during the 2026 NCAA Division I FBS football season. The Panthers are led by Pat Narduzzi in his 12th season as their head coach. They play their home games at Acrisure Stadium located in Pittsburgh, Pennsylvania.

== Schedule ==
Date	Time	Opponent	Rank	Site	TV	Result	Attendance
September 5	12:30 p.m.	Miami (OH)*		Acrisure Stadium; Pittsburgh, PA	The CW	W 59–14	43,929
September 12	4:35 p.m.	UCF*		Acrisure Stadium; Pittsburgh, PA	ESPN2	W 12–7	45,926
September 17	7:30 p.m.	Syracuse		Acrisure Stadium; Pittsburgh, PA (rivalry)	ESPN	W 27–13	42,087
September 26	12:00 p.m.	Bucknell*^{†}		Acrisure Stadium; Pittsburgh, PA	ACCNX	W 59–0	43,920
October 2	7:00 p.m.	at Virginia Tech		Lane Stadium; Blacksburg, VA	ESPN	W 35–33	65,632
October 10	12:00 p.m.	North Carolina	No. 25	Acrisure Stadium; Pittsburgh, PA	ESPN	L 17–21	51,416
October 17	12:00 p.m.	at Boston College		Alumni Stadium; Chestnut Hill, MA	ESPN2	L 21–27	32,847
October 24	12:00 p.m.	at No. 1 Miami (FL)		Hard Rock Stadium; Miami Gardens, FL	ESPN	L 23–52	65,991
October 31	7:30 p.m.	Georgia Tech		Acrisure Stadium; Pittsburgh, PA	ESPN2	W 34–11	42,904
November 13	7:00 p.m.	Florida State		Acrisure Stadium; Pittsburgh, PA	ESPN	L 10–16	45,734
November 21	7:30 p.m.	at No. 23 Louisville		L&N Federal Credit Union Stadium; Louisville, KY	ESPN2	L 10–42	45,892
November 28	7:30 p.m.	at California		California Memorial Stadium; Berkeley, CA	ACCN		
*Non-conference game; ^{†}Homecoming; Rankings from AP Poll (and CFP Rankings, after November 3) – Released prior to game; All times are in Eastern time

== Rankings ==
Ranking movements Legend: ██ Increase in ranking ██ Decrease in ranking — = Not ranked RV = Received votes
	Week															
Poll	Pre	1	2	3	4	5	6	7	8	9	10	11	12	13	14	Final
AP	RV	RV	RV	RV	RV	25	—	—	—	—	—	—	—			
Coaches	RV	RV	RV	RV	RV	24	RV	RV	—	—	—	—	—			
CFP	Not released									—	—	—				Not released

== Game summaries ==
=== vs. Miami (OH) ===
Miami RedHawks (0–0) at Pittsburgh Panthers (0–0) – Game summary

Quarter	1	2	3	4	Total
RedHawks	0	14	0	0	14
Panthers	21	10	21	7	59

at Acrisure Stadium • Pittsburgh, Pennsylvania

- Date: September 5
- Game time: 12:30 p.m. EDT
- Game weather: Cloudy • Temperature: 76 °F (24 °C) • Wind: NW at 6 mph
- Game attendance: 43,929
- Referee: Riley Johnson
- TV announcers (The CW): Thom Brennaman, Jason Cabinda and Wes Bryant

Game information

First quarter

- PITT – Malik Knight 17-yard pass from Mason Heintschel (Antonio Chadha kick), 10:06. Panthers 7–0. Drive: 8 plays, 80 yards, 4:00.
- PITT – Justin Cook 50-yard run (Antonio Chadha kick), 4:55. Panthers 14–0. Drive: 7 plays, 89 yards, 3:21.
- PITT – Elijah Lagg 5-yard pass from Mason Heintschel (Antonio Chadha kick), 0:09. Panthers 21–0. Drive: 7 plays, 50 yards, 3:45.

Second quarter

- M-OH – D'Shawntae Jones 1-yard run (Kellan McLaughlin kick), 10:29. Panthers 21–7. Drive: 11 plays, 75 yards, 4:40.
- PITT – Ja'Kyrian Turner 45-yard pass from Mason Heintschel (Antonio Chadha kick), 4:44. Panthers 28–7. Drive: 1 play, 45 yards, 0:11.
- M-OH – Damarion Witten 75-yard pass from David McComb (Kellan McLaughlin kick), 4:34. Panthers 28–14. Drive: 1 play, 75 yards, 0:10.
- PITT – Antonio Chadha 58-yard field goal, 0:00. Panthers 31–14. Drive: 11 plays, 41 yards, 1:01.

Third quarter

- PITT – Cataurus Hicks 53-yard pass from Mason Heintschel (Antonio Chadha kick), 13:26. Panthers 38–14. Drive: 5 plays, 75 yards, 1:34.
- PITT – Censere Lee 35-yard pass from Mason Heintschel (Antonio Chadha kick), 7:43. Panthers 45–14. Drive: 8 plays, 76 yards, 4:05.
- PITT – Bryce Yates 27-yard pass from Mason Heintschel (Antonio Chadha kick), 5:24. Panthers 52–14. Drive: 4 plays, 63 yards, 1:26.

Fourth quarter

- PITT – Damon Ferguson Jr. 15-yard pass from Mason Heintschel (Sam Hunsaker kick), 9:48. Panthers 59–14. Drive: 11 plays, 87 yards, 6:31.

Statistics	M-OH	PITT
First downs	14	33
Plays–yards	58–289	75–646
Rushes–yards	21–28	31–166
Passing yards	261	480
Passing: comp–att–int	19–37–1	34–44–0
Turnovers	1	0
Time of possession	26:04	33:56

Team	Category	Player	Statistics
Miami (OH)	Passing	David McComb	16/33, 240 yards, TD
Miami (OH)	Rushing	Lazaro Rogers	6 carries, 21 yards
Miami (OH)	Receiving	Damarion Witten	2 receptions, 90 yards, TD
Pittsburgh	Passing	Mason Heintschel	31/41, 453 yards, 7 TD
Pittsburgh	Rushing	Justin Cook	1 carry, 50 yards, TD
Pittsburgh	Receiving	Cataurus Hicks	5 receptions, 114 yards, TD

=== vs. UCF ===
UCF Knights (1–0) at Pittsburgh Panthers (1–0) – Game summary

Quarter	1	2	3	4	Total
Knights	0	0	0	7	7
Panthers	3	9	0	0	12

at Acrisure Stadium • Pittsburgh, Pennsylvania

- Date: September 12
- Game time: 4:35 p.m. EDT
- Game weather: Rain • Temperature: 75 °F (24 °C) • Wind: S at 6 mph
- Game attendance: 45,926
- Referee: Henry Johns
- TV announcers (ESPN2): Lowell Galindo, Kirk Morrison and Dawn Davenport

Game information

First quarter

- PIT – Antonio Chadha 28-yard field goal, 0:04, Panthers 3–0. Drive: 18 plays, 83 yards, 7:03.

Second quarter

- PIT – Safety (Alonza Barnett III intentional grounding in endzone), 7:24, Panthers 5–0.
- PIT – Damon Ferguson Jr. 13-yard run (Antonio Chadha kick), 11:02, Panthers 12–0. Drive: 7 plays, 44 yards, 2:32.

Third quarter

- No scoring plays.

Fourth quarter

- UCF – Waden Charles 19-yard pass from Alonza Barnett III (Will Stone kick), 2:51, Panthers 12–7. Drive: 9 plays, 64 yards, 3:54.

Statistics	UCF	PITT
First downs	9	15
Plays–yards	53–206	72–315
Rushes–yards	22–20	43–103
Passing yards	186	212
Passing: comp–att–int	23–31–0	18–29–0
Turnovers	0	0
Time of possession	23:48	36:12

Team	Category	Player	Statistics
UCF	Passing	Alonza Barnett III	20/31, 186 yards, TD
UCF	Rushing	Alonza Barnett III	13 carries, 13 yards
UCF	Receiving	Ric'Darious Farmer	4 receptions, 52 yards
Pittsburgh	Passing	Mason Heintschel	18/29, 212 yards
Pittsburgh	Rushing	Damon Ferguson Jr.	20 carries, 59 yards, TD
Pittsburgh	Receiving	Cataurus Hicks	3 receptions, 64 yards

=== vs. Syracuse (rivalry) ===
Syracuse Orange (1–1) at Pittsburgh Panthers (2–0) – Game summary

Quarter	1	2	3	4	Total
Orange	0	10	0	3	13
Panthers	7	10	7	3	27

at Acrisure Stadium • Pittsburgh, Pennsylvania

- Date: September 17
- Game time: 7:30 p.m. EDT
- Game weather: Cloudy • Temperature: 79 °F (26 °C) • Wind: W at 4 mph
- Game attendance: 42,087
- Referee: Tim Hedgepeth
- TV announcers (ESPN): Matt Barrie, Chase Daniel and Paul Carcaterra

Statistics	SYR	PITT
First downs	23	22
Plays–yards	71–347	60–368
Rushes–yards	38–135	37–245
Passing yards	212	123
Passing: comp–att–int	21–33–2	10–23–1
Turnovers	2	1
Time of possession	33:12	26:48

Team	Category	Player	Statistics
Syracuse	Passing	Steve Angeli	13/25, 161 yards, 2 INT
Syracuse	Rushing	Ahmad Miller	14 carries, 78 yards, TD
Syracuse	Receiving	Umari Hatcher	3 receptions, 58 yards
Pittsburgh	Passing	Mason Heintschel	10/23, 123 yards, INT
Pittsburgh	Rushing	Damon Ferguson Jr.	10 carries, 102 yards, TD
Pittsburgh	Receiving	Carson Kent	2 receptions, 63 yards

=== vs. Bucknell (FCS) ===
Bucknell Bison (FCS) (1–3) at Pittsburgh Panthers (3–0) – Game summary

Quarter	1	2	3	4	Total
Bison (FCS)	0	0	0	0	0
Panthers	14	21	7	17	59

at Acrisure Stadium • Pittsburgh, Pennsylvania

- Date: September 26
- Game time: 12:00 p.m. EDT
- TV announcers (ACCNX): Pete Sousa and Leger Douzable

Game information

First quarter
Second quarter
Third quarter
Fourth quarter

Statistics	BUCK	PITT
First downs	10	35
Plays–yards	52–136	83–766
Rushes–yards	24–31	30–192
Passing yards	105	574
Passing: comp–att–int	14–28–0	40–53–0
Turnovers	0	1
Time of possession	27:26	32:34

Team	Category	Player	Statistics
Bucknell	Passing	Christopher Dietrich	4/7, 56 yards
Bucknell	Rushing	Jack Sullivan	10 carries, 31 yards
Bucknell	Receiving	TJ Cadden	4 receptions, 33 yards
Pittsburgh	Passing	Mason Heintschel	29/37, 403 yards, 6 TD
Pittsburgh	Rushing	Damon Ferguson Jr.	9 carries, 56 yards
Pittsburgh	Receiving	Tyreek Robinson	5 receptions, 78 yards, TD

=== at Virginia Tech ===
Pittsburgh Panthers (4–0) at Virginia Tech Hokies (4–0) – Game summary

Quarter	1	2	3	4	Total
Panthers	7	14	7	7	35
Hokies	14	10	0	9	33

at Lane Stadium • Blacksburg, Virginia

- Date: October 2
- Game time: 7:00 p.m. EDT
- Game weather: Rain • Temperature: 75 °F (24 °C) • Wind: W at 7 miles per hour (11 km/h)
- Game attendance: 65,632
- Referee: Nate Black
- TV announcers (ESPN): Mike Monaco, Jordan Rodgers, and Dana Boyle

Statistics	PITT	VT
First downs	18	21
Plays–yards	61–295	73–499
Rushes–yards	31–104	32–65
Passing yards	191	434
Passing: comp–att–int	18–30–0	30–41–2
Turnovers	0	4
Time of possession	28:38	31:22

Team	Category	Player	Statistics
Pittsburgh	Passing	Mason Heintschel	10/18, 113 yards, TD
Pittsburgh	Rushing	Ja'Kyrian Turner	14 carries, 65 yards, TD
Pittsburgh	Receiving	Cataurus Hicks	3 receptions, 63 yards, 2 TD
Virginia Tech	Passing	Ethan Grunkemeyer	30/41, 434 yards, 3 TD, 2 INT
Virginia Tech	Rushing	Jeffrey Overton Jr.	17 carries, 46 yards
Virginia Tech	Receiving	Que'Sean Brown	7 receptions, 147 yards, TD

=== vs. North Carolina ===
North Carolina Tar Heels (2–2) at No. 25 Pittsburgh Panthers (5–0) – Game summary

Quarter	1	2	3	4	Total
Tar Heels	0	7	7	7	21
No. 25 Panthers	7	3	0	7	17

at Acrisure Stadium • Pittsburgh, Pennsylvania

- Date: October 10
- Game time: 12:00 p.m. EDT
- Game weather: Cloudy • Temperature: 66 °F (19 °C) • Wind: SE at 8 miles per hour (13 km/h)
- Game attendance: 51,416
- Referee: Riley Johnson
- TV announcers (ESPN): Tom Hart, Roddy Jones, and Quint Kessenich

Statistics	UNC	PITT
First downs	13	23
Plays–yards	51–269	85–369
Rushes–yards	25–20	41–150
Passing yards	249	219
Passing: comp–att–int	18–26–2	27–44–2
Turnovers	2	2
Time of possession	23:28	36:32

Team	Category	Player	Statistics
North Carolina	Passing	Billy Edwards Jr.	18/26, 249 yards, 2 TD, 2 INT
North Carolina	Rushing	Benjamin Hall	12 carries, 25 yards
North Carolina	Receiving	Jordan Shipp	6 receptions, 93 yards
Pittsburgh	Passing	Holden Geriner	27/44, 219 yards, 2 INT
Pittsburgh	Rushing	Damon Ferguson Jr.	15 carries, 49 yards
Pittsburgh	Receiving	Malik Knight	3 receptions, 62 yards

=== at Boston College ===
Pittsburgh Panthers (5–1) at Boston College Eagles (2–3) – Game summary

Quarter	1	2	3	4	Total
Panthers	0	0	0	0	0
Eagles	0	0	0	0	0

at Alumni Stadium • Chestnut Hill, Massachusetts

- Date: October 17
- Game time: 12:00 p.m. EDT
- TV announcers (ESPN2): Anish Shroff, Jay Walker, and Morgan Uber

Statistics	PITT	BC
First downs		
Plays–yards		
Rushes–yards		
Passing yards		
Passing: comp–att–int		
Time of possession		

Team	Category	Player	Statistics
Pittsburgh	Passing		
Pittsburgh	Rushing		
Pittsburgh	Receiving		
Boston College	Passing		
Boston College	Rushing		
Boston College	Receiving		

=== at No. 1 Miami (FL) ===
Pittsburgh Panthers (5–2) at No. 1 Miami Hurricanes (6–0) – Game summary

Quarter	1	2	3	4	Total
Panthers	0	7	7	9	23
No. 1 Hurricanes	10	21	14	7	52

at Hard Rock Stadium • Miami Gardens, Florida

- Date: October 24
- Game time: 12:00 p.m.
- Game attendance: 65,991
- TV announcers (ESPN): Bob Wischusen, Louis Riddick, and Stormy Buonantony

Statistics	PITT	MIA
First downs		
Plays–yards		
Rushes–yards		
Passing yards		
Passing: comp–att–int		
Time of possession		

Team	Category	Player	Statistics
Pittsburgh	Passing		
Pittsburgh	Rushing		
Pittsburgh	Receiving		
Miami (FL)	Passing		
Miami (FL)	Rushing		
Miami (FL)	Receiving		

=== vs. Georgia Tech ===
Georgia Tech Yellow Jackets (2–5) at Pittsburgh Panthers (5–3) – Game summary

Quarter	1	2	3	4	Total
Yellow Jackets	0	0	0	0	0
Panthers	0	0	0	0	0

at Acrisure Stadium • Pittsburgh, Pennsylvania

- Date: October 31
- Game time: TBD

Statistics	GT	PITT
First downs		
Plays–yards		
Rushes–yards		
Passing yards		
Passing: comp–att–int		
Time of possession		

Team	Category	Player	Statistics
Georgia Tech	Passing		
Georgia Tech	Rushing		
Georgia Tech	Receiving		
Pittsburgh	Passing		
Pittsburgh	Rushing		
Pittsburgh	Receiving		

=== vs. Florida State ===
Florida State Seminoles (4–5) at Pittsburgh Panthers (6–3) – Game summary

Quarter	1	2	3	4	Total
Seminoles	3	3	7	3	16
Panthers	0	7	3	0	10

at Acrisure Stadium • Pittsburgh, Pennsylvania

- Date: November 13
- Game time: 7:00 p.m. EST
- Game weather: Cloudy • Temperature: 40 °F (4 °C) • Wind: NW at 7 miles per hour (11 km/h)
- Game attendance: 45,734
- Referee: Jon Noli
- TV announcers (ESPN): Mike Monaco, Jordan Rodgers, and Dana Boyle

Game information

First Quarter

- FSU: Gabe Panikowski 37 yd FG GOOD; 10 plays, 56 yards, 3:43. Seminoles 3–0

Second Quarter

- FSU: Gabe Panikowski 27 yd FG GOOD; 11 plays, 83 yards, 5:50. Seminoles 6–0
- PITT: Corey Dailey pass to Ja'Kyrian Turner for 11 yds, for a TD (Antonio Chadha KICK); 10 plays, 85 yards, 5:12. Panthers 7–6

Third Quarter

- FSU: Amari Thomas run for 1 yd, for a TD (Gabe Panikowski KICK); 5 plays, 32 yards, 2:14. Seminoles 13–7
- PITT: Antonio Chadha 34 yd FG GOOD; 9 plays, 36 yards, 3:26. Seminoles 13–10

Fourth Quarter

- FSU: Gabe Panikowski 47 yd FG GOOD; 6 plays, 23 yards, 2:17. Seminoles 16–10

Statistics	FSU	PITT
First downs	13	16
Plays–yards	57–260	71–306
Rushes–yards	33–97	37–149
Passing yards	163	157
Passing: comp–att–int	16–24–0	16–34–1
Turnovers	1	1
Time of possession	30:07	29:53

Team	Category	Player	Statistics
Florida State	Passing	Ashton Daniels	16–24, 163 yards
Florida State	Rushing	Amari Thomas	13 carries, 39 yards, 1 TD
Florida State	Receiving	Jasen Lopez	5 receptions, 72 yards
Pittsburgh	Passing	Corey Dailey	16–34, 157 yards, 1 TD, 1 INT
Pittsburgh	Rushing	Corey Dailey	9 carries, 58 yards
Pittsburgh	Receiving	Malik Knight	3 receptions, 55 yards

=== at No. 23 Louisville ===
Pittsburgh Panthers (6–4) at No. 23 Louisville Cardinals (7–3) – Game summary

Quarter	1	2	3	4	Total
Panthers	0	10	0	0	10
No. 23 Cardinals	7	7	14	14	42

at L&N Federal Credit Union Stadium • Louisville, Kentucky

- Date: November 21
- Game time: 7:30 p.m. EST
- Game weather: Clear • Temperature: 59 °F (15 °C) • Wind: SE at 2 miles per hour (3.2 km/h)
- Game attendance: 45,892
- Referee: Justin Elliott
- TV announcers (ESPN2): Jay Alter, Tom Luginbill, and Lauren Sisler

Game information

First quarter

- (1:03) LOU – TreyShun Hurry 13-yard pass from Lincoln Kienholz (Carson Hilbert kick) (Drive: 5 plays, 34 yards, 1:55; Louisville 7–0)

Second quarter

- (9:22) PITT – Isaiah Neal 31-yard fumble return (Antonio Chadha kick) (Tied 7–7)
- (4:52) LOU – Lawayne McCoy 14-yard pass from Lincoln Kienholz (Carson Hilbert kick) (Drive: 4 plays, 29 yards, 0:55; Louisville 14–7)
- (0:00) PITT – Antoinio Chadha 57-yard field goal (Drive: 4 plays, -2 yards, 0:52; Louisville 14–10)

Third quarter

- (9:40) LOU – Tre Richardson 33-yard pass from Lincoln Kienholz (Carson Hilbert kick) (Drive: 6 plays, 56 yards, 2:57; Louisville 21–10)
- (5:13) LOU – Lawayne McCoy 23-yard pass from Lincoln Kienholz (Carson Hilbert kick) (Drive: 7 plays, 48 yards, 3:35; Louisville 28–10)

Fourth quarter

- (14:52) LOU – Tre Richardson 23-yard pass from Lincoln Kienholz (Carson Hilbert kick) (Drive: 5 plays, 64 yards, 2:14; Louisville 35–10)
- (3:19) LOU – Keyjuan Brown 1-yard run (Garth White kick) (Drive: 15 plays, 68 yards, 10:16; Louisville 42–10)

Statistics	PITT	LOU
First downs	8	25
Total yards	150	396
Rushes–yards	25–48	42–87
Passing yards	102	309
Passing: comp–att–int	15–28–2	25–41–1
Turnovers	4	2
Time of possession	20:58	39:02

Team	Category	Player	Statistics
Pittsburgh	Passing	Holden Geriner	12–20, 80 yards, 2 INT
Pittsburgh	Rushing	Damon Ferguson Jr.	11 carries, 46 yards
Pittsburgh	Receiving	Damon Ferguson Jr.	4 receptions, 32 yards
Louisville	Passing	Lincoln Kienholz	25–41, 309 yards, 5 TD, INT
Louisville	Rushing	Keyjuan Brown	18 carries, 73 yards, TD
Louisville	Receiving	Tre Richardson	8 receptions, 114 yards, 2 TD

=== at California ===
Pittsburgh Panthers (6–5) at California Golden Bears (3–8) – Game summary

Quarter	1	2	3	4	Total
Panthers	0	0	0	0	0
Golden Bears	0	0	0	0	0

at California Memorial Stadium • Berkeley, California

- Date: November 28
- Game time: TBD

Statistics	PITT	CAL
First downs		
Plays–yards		
Rushes–yards		
Passing yards		
Passing: comp–att–int		
Time of possession		

Team	Category	Player	Statistics
Pittsburgh	Passing		
Pittsburgh	Rushing		
Pittsburgh	Receiving		
California	Passing		
California	Rushing		
California	Receiving		
