= 2026 Villanova Wildcats football team =

American college football season

2026 Villanova Wildcats football
- Conference: Patriot
- Record: 7–5 (6–3 Patriot)
- Head coach: Mark Ferrante (10th season)
- Offensive coordinator: Chris Boden (8th season)
- Offensive scheme: Spread
- Defensive coordinator: Ross Pennypacker (5th season)
- Base defense: Multiple 3–3–5
- Home stadium: Villanova Stadium

2026 Patriot League football standings
	Conf.			Overall
Team	W		L	W		L
No. 16 Lehigh $^	8	–	1	10	–	2
Holy Cross	7	–	2	7	–	5
Colgate	6	–	3	7	–	5
Villanova	6	–	3	7	–	5
Richmond	5	–	4	7	–	5
Fordham	4	–	5	4	–	8
Lafayette	3	–	5	4	–	7
Georgetown	3	–	5	3	–	7
William & Mary	2	–	7	4	–	8
Bucknell	0	–	9	1	–	11
$ – Conference champion; ^ – FCS playoff participant; As of November 22, 2026; Rankings from STATS Poll

The 2026 Villanova Wildcats football team represent Villanova University as a member of the Patriot League during the 2026 NCAA Division I FCS football season. The Wildcats are led by tenth-year head coach Mark Ferrante and play their home games at Villanova Stadium located in Villanova, Pennsylvania.

This is the first season for Villanova in the Patriot League. The Wildcats became a football-only member of the Patriot League in 2026, leaving the Coastal Athletic Association after 19 seasons.

== Schedule ==
Date	Time	Opponent	Rank	Site	TV	Result	Attendance
August 28	6:00 pm	William & Mary	No. 8	Villanova Stadium; Villanova, PA	ESPN+	L 32–35	5,221
September 5	6:00 pm	at Bucknell	No. 18	Christy Mathewson-Memorial Stadium; Lewisburg, PA	ESPN+	W 17–16	N/A
September 11	7:00 pm	at No. 24 (FBS) Louisville*	No. 21	L&N Federal Credit Union Stadium; Louisville, KY	ACCN	L 13–59	46,385
September 19	12:00 pm	at LIU*	No. 22	Bethpage Federal Credit Union Stadium; Brookville, NY	NEC Front Row	W 20–16	3,086
September 26	2:00 pm	Colgate	No. 23	Villanova Stadium; Villanova, PA	ESPN+	L 21–28	6,753
October 3	1:00 pm	Morgan State*		Villanova Stadium; Villanova, PA	ESPN+	L 35–38	3,463
October 17	3:30 pm	at Fordham		Coffey Field; Bronx, NY	ESPN+	W 38–17	2,369
October 24	3:30 pm	No. 11 Lehigh		Villanova Stadium; Villanova, PA	ESPN+	W 24–18	5,451
October 31	12:30 pm	at Lafayette		Fisher Stadium; Easton, PA	ESPN+	W 44–21	4,293
November 7	1:00 pm	Richmond		Villanova Stadium; Villanova, PA	ESPN+	W 30–0	3,747
November 14	12:00 pm	at Holy Cross		Fitton Field; Worcester, MA	ESPN+	L 27–30 ^{OT}	10,160
November 21	1:00 pm	Georgetown		Villanova Stadium; Villanova, PA	ESPN+	W 34–13	4,097
*Non-conference game; Rankings from STATS Poll released prior to the game; All times are in Eastern time

== Game summaries ==
=== William & Mary ===
William & Mary Tribe (0–0) at No. 8 Villanova Wildcats (0–0) – Game summary

Quarter	1	2	3	4	Total
Tribe	7	3	9	16	35
Wildcats	7	10	0	15	32

at Villanova Stadium • Villanova, PA

- Date: August 28
- Game time: 6:00 PM
- Game weather: Sunny • Wind: NW at 6 miles per hour (9.7 km/h)
- Game attendance: 5,221
- Referee: Anthony Florio
- TV announcers (ESPN+): Roxy Bernstein, Steve Pinone, and Tessa Peloso

Game information

First quarter

- VILL – Isaiah Ragland 5-yard run (Dominic LeBlanc kick), 7:52. Wildcats 7–0. Drive: 11 plays, 75 yards, 7:08.
- W&M – Carson Jenkins 68-yard pass from Winston Watkins (Max Lipinski kick), 5:55. Tied 7–7. Drive: 4 plays, 81 yards, 1:48.

Second quarter

- W&M – Max Lipinski 22-yard field goal, 6:12. Tribe 10–7. Drive: 10 plays, 73 yards, 5:12.
- VILL – Ja'briel Mace 11-yard run (Dominic LeBlanc kick), 1:21. Wildcats 14–10. Drive: 7 plays, 63 yards, 2:37.
- VILL – Dominic LeBlanc 42-yard field goal, 0:00. Wildcats 17–10. Drive: 4 plays, 40 yards, 0:21.

Third quarter

- W&M – Max Lipinski 39-yard field goal, 8:08. Wildcats 17–13. Drive: 14 plays, 54 yards, 6:43.
- W&M – Winston Watkins 1-yard run (Max Lipinski kick failed), 5:26. Tribe 19–17. Drive: 4 plays, 45 yards, 5:21.

Fourth quarter

- W&M – Max Lipinski 41-yard field goal, 9:18. Tribe 22–17. Drive: 13 plays, 46 yards, 5:21.
- VILL – Brandon Binkowski 8-yard pass from Pat McQuaide (Pat McQuaide–Jake Hilton pass), 3:47. Wildcats 25–22. Drive: 7 plays, 32 yards, 2:30.
- VILL – Isaiah Ragland 37-yard run (Dominic LeBlanc kick), 2:43. Wildcats 32–22. Drive: 1 play, 37 yards, 0:10.
- W&M – Max Lipinski 40-yard field goal, 0:53. Wildcats 32–25. Drive: 12 plays, 52 yards, 1:50.
- W&M – Kai Austin 37-yard pass from Winston Watkins (Max Lipinski kick), 0:22. Tied 32–32. Drive: 3 plays, 39 yards, 0:28.
- W&M – Max Lipinski 45-yard field goal, 0:00. Tribe 35–32. Drive: 1 play, 0 yards, 0:05.

Statistics	W&M	VILL
First downs	21	20
Plays–yards	77–393	60–427
Rushes–yards	41–130	30–157
Passing yards	263	270
Passing: Comp–Att–Int	20–36–1	17–30–3
Turnovers	1	4
Time of possession	31:59	28:01

Team	Category	Player	Statistics
William & Mary	Passing	Winston Watkins	19/33, 254 yards, 2 TD, INT
William & Mary	Rushing	Winston Watkins	21 carries, 72 yards, TD
William & Mary	Receiving	Kai Austin	4 receptions, 76 yards, TD
Villanova	Passing	Pat McQuaide	17/30, 270 yards, TD, 3 INT
Villanova	Rushing	Isaiah Ragland	14 carries, 94 yards, 2 TD
Villanova	Receiving	Jake Hilton	4 receptions, 132 yards

=== at Bucknell ===
No. 18 Villanova Wildcats (0–1) at Bucknell Bison (0–1) – Game summary

Quarter	1	2	3	4	Total
No. 18 Wildcats	7	7	0	3	17
Bison	0	0	13	3	16

at Christy Mathewson–Memorial Stadium • Lewisburg, Pennsylvania

- Date: September 5
- Game time: 6:00 p.m.
- Game weather: Sunny • Wind: NW at 8 miles per hour (13 km/h)
- Referee: Antonio Marcella
- TV announcers (ESPN+): Doug Birdsong (play-by-play) and Charlie Fisher (analyst)

Game information

First quarter

- VILL – Braden Reed 26-yard pass from Pat McQuaide (Dominic LeBlanc kick), 5:24. Wildcats 7–0. Drive: 8 plays, 76 yards, 3:27.

Second quarter

- VILL – Braden Reed 16-yard pass from Pat McQuaide (Dominic LeBlanc kick), 1:13. Wildcats 14–0. Drive: 6 plays, 72 yards, 2:04.

Third quarter

- BUCK – Sam Milligan 1-yard pass from Christopher Dietrich (Juan Garanton kick), 7:54. Wildcats 14–7. Drive: 15 plays, 75 yards, 7:06.
- BUCK – Sam Milligan 10-yard pass from Christopher Dietrich (Juan Garanton kick failed), 1:09. Wildcats 14–13. Drive: 9 plays, 59 yards, 5:14.

Fourth quarter

- BUCK – Juan Garanton 40-yard field goal, 12:06. Bison 16–14. Drive: 6 plays, -3 yards, 2:39.
- VILL – Dominic LeBlanc 22-yard field goal, 8:20. Wildcats 17–16. Drive: 8 plays, 65 yards, 3:42.

Statistics	VILL	BUCK
First downs	16	22
Plays–yards	53–305	69–305
Rushes–yards	33–87	30–60
Passing yards	218	245
Passing: comp–att–int	13–20–0	29–39–0
Turnovers	0	0
Time of possession	24:30	35:30

Team	Category	Player	Statistics
Villanova	Passing	Pat McQuaide	13/20, 218 yards, 2 TD
Villanova	Rushing	Ja'briel Mace	13 carries, 70 yards
Villanova	Receiving	Brandon Binkowski	3 receptions, 71 yards
Bucknell	Passing	Christopher Dietrich	29/39, 245 yards, 2 TD
Bucknell	Rushing	Michael Cadden	9 carries, 37 yards
Bucknell	Receiving	Sam Milligan	13 receptions, 135 yards, 2 TD

=== at No. 24 Louisville (FBS) ===
No. 21 Villanova Wildcats (1–1) at No. 24 Louisville Cardinals (FBS) (0–1) – Game summary

Quarter	1	2	3	4	Total
No. 21 Wildcats	3	7	3	0	13
No. 24 Cardinals (FBS)	17	14	14	14	59

at L&N Federal Credit Union Stadium • Louisville, Kentucky

- Date: September 11
- Game time: 7:00 p.m.
- Game weather: Sunny • Temperature: 79 °F (26 °C) • Wind: SW at 7 miles per hour (11 km/h)
- Game attendance: 46,385
- Referee: Mike Roche
- TV announcers (ACCN): Cooper Boardman, Charles Arbuckle, and Ashley Stroehlein

Game information

First quarter

- (12:16) LOU – Carson Hilbert 33-yard field goal (Drive: 7 plays, 35 yards, 2:35; Louisville 3–0)
- (6:24) VILL – Dominic LeBlanc 35-yard field goal (Drive: 12 plays, 58 yards, 5:52; Tied 3–3)
- (4:33) LOU – Lincoln Kienholz 19-yard run (Carson Hilbert kick) (Drive: 4 plays, 72 yards, 1:44; Louisville 10–3)
- (0:14) LOU – Jaleel Skinner 69-yard pass from Lincoln Kienholz (Carson Hilbert kick) (Drive: 5 plays, 82 yards, 2:09; Louisville 17–3)

Second quarter

- (14:50) VILL – Ja'briel Mace 65-yard pass from Pat McQuaide (Dominic LeBlanc kick) (Drive: 2 plays, 75 yards, 0:29; Louisville 17–10)
- (13:24) LOU – Lawayne McCoy 61-yard pass from Lincoln Kienholz (Carson Hilbert kick) (Drive: 2 plays, 80 yards, 1:16; Louisville 24–10)
- (1:53) LOU – Lincoln Kienholz 4-yard run (Carson Hilbert kick) (Drive: 10 plays, 85 yards, 3:39; Louisville 31–10)

Third quarter

- (7:50) LOU – Braxton Jennings 15-yard run (Carson Hilbert kick) (Drive: 4 plays, 52 yards, 2:03; Louisville 38–10)
- (3:42) VILL – Dominic LeBlanc 29-yard field goal (Drive: 13 plays, 63 yards, 4:08; Louisville 38–13)
- (0:07) LOU – Marquise Davis 3-yard run (Garth White kick) (Drive: 8 plays, 59 yards, 3:29; Louisville 45–13)

Fourth quarter

- (12:36) LOU – Braxton Jennings 2-yard pass from Davin Wydner (Garth White kick) (Drive: 5 plays, 16 yards, 2:17; Louisville 52–13)
- (7:04) LOU – Marquise Davis 4-yard run (Garth White kick) (Drive: 6 plays, 65 yards, 2:21; Louisville 59–13)

Statistics	VILL	LOU
First downs	15	29
Total yards	253	635
Rushes–yards	28–75	38–260
Passing yards	178	375
Passing: comp–att–int	20–34–0	21–28–0
Turnovers	1	0
Time of possession	30:51	29:09

Team	Category	Player	Statistics
Villanova	Passing	Pat McQuaide	18/31, 166 yards, TD
Villanova	Rushing	Isaiah Ragland	9 carries, 34 yards
Villanova	Receiving	Ja'briel Mace	3 receptions, 73 yards, TD
Louisville	Passing	Lincoln Kienholz	16/21, 332 yards, 2 TD
Louisville	Rushing	Marquise Davis	7 carries, 86 yards, 2 TD
Louisville	Receiving	Lawayne McCoy	3 receptions, 102 yards, TD

=== at LIU ===
No. 22 Villanova Wildcats (1–2) at LIU Sharks (0–3) – Game summary

Quarter	1	2	Total
No. 22 Wildcats			0
Sharks			0

at Bethpage Federal Credit Union Stadium • Brookville, New York

- Date: September 19
- Game time: 12:00 p.m.

Game information

First quarter
Second quarter
Third quarter
Fourth quarter

Statistics	VILL	LIU
First downs		
Plays–yards		
Rushes–yards		
Passing yards		
Passing: comp–att–int		
Turnovers		
Time of possession		

Team	Category	Player	Statistics
Villanova	Passing		
Villanova	Rushing		
Villanova	Receiving		
LIU	Passing		
LIU	Rushing		
LIU	Receiving		

=== Colgate ===
Colgate Raiders (3–1) at No. 23 Villanova Wildcats (2–2) – Game summary

Quarter	1	2	Total
Raiders			0
No. 23 Wildcats			0

at Villanova Stadium • Villanova, Pennsylvania

- Date: September 26
- Game time: 2:00 p.m.
- TV: ESPN+

Game information

First quarter
Second quarter
Third quarter
Fourth quarter

Statistics	COLG	VILL
First downs		
Plays–yards		
Rushes–yards		
Passing yards		
Passing: comp–att–int		
Turnovers		
Time of possession		

Team	Category	Player	Statistics
Colgate	Passing		
Colgate	Rushing		
Colgate	Receiving		
Villanova	Passing		
Villanova	Rushing		
Villanova	Receiving		

=== Morgan State ===
Morgan State Bears (3–1) at Villanova Wildcats (2–3) – Game summary

Quarter	1	2	3	4	Total
Bears	0	0	0	0	0
Wildcats	0	0	0	0	0

at Villanova Stadium • Villanova, Pennsylvania

- Date: October 3
- Game time: 1:00 p.m.
- TV: ESPN+

Game information

First quarter
Second quarter
Third quarter
Fourth quarter

Statistics	MORG	VILL
First downs		
Plays–yards		
Rushes–yards		
Passing yards		
Passing: comp–att–int		
Turnovers		
Time of possession		

Team	Category	Player	Statistics
Morgan State	Passing		
Morgan State	Rushing		
Morgan State	Receiving		
Villanova	Passing		
Villanova	Rushing		
Villanova	Receiving		

=== at Fordham ===
Villanova Wildcats (2–4) at Fordham Rams (2–5) – Game summary

Quarter	1	2	Total
Wildcats			0
Rams			0

at Coffey Field • The Bronx, New York

- Date: October 17
- Game time: 3:30 p.m.
- TV: ESPN+

Game information

First quarter
Second quarter
Third quarter
Fourth quarter

Statistics	VILL	FOR
First downs		
Plays–yards		
Rushes–yards		
Passing yards		
Passing: comp–att–int		
Turnovers		
Time of possession		

Team	Category	Player	Statistics
Villanova	Passing		
Villanova	Rushing		
Villanova	Receiving		
Fordham	Passing		
Fordham	Rushing		
Fordham	Receiving		

=== No. 11 Lehigh ===
No. 11 Lehigh Mountain Hawks (6–1) at Villanova Wildcats (3–4) – Game summary

Quarter	1	2	Total
No. 11 Mountain Hawks			0
Wildcats			0

at Villanova Stadium • Villanova, Pennsylvania

- Date: October 24

Game information

First quarter
Second quarter
Third quarter
Fourth quarter

Statistics	LEH	VILL
First downs		
Plays–yards		
Rushes–yards		
Passing yards		
Passing: comp–att–int		
Turnovers		
Time of possession		

Team	Category	Player	Statistics
Lehigh	Passing		
Lehigh	Rushing		
Lehigh	Receiving		
Villanova	Passing		
Villanova	Rushing		
Villanova	Receiving		

=== at Lafayette ===
Villanova Wildcats (4–4) at Lafayette Leopards (3–4) – Game summary

Quarter	1	2	Total
Wildcats			0
Leopards			0

at Fisher Stadium • Easton, Pennsylvania

- Date: October 31
- Game time: 12:30 p.m.

Game information

First quarter
Second quarter
Third quarter
Fourth quarter

Statistics	VILL	LAF
First downs		
Plays–yards		
Rushes–yards		
Passing yards		
Passing: comp–att–int		
Turnovers		
Time of possession		

Team	Category	Player	Statistics
Villanova	Passing		
Villanova	Rushing		
Villanova	Receiving		
Lafayette	Passing		
Lafayette	Rushing		
Lafayette	Receiving		

=== Richmond ===
Richmond Spiders (6–3) at Villanova Wildcats (5–4) – Game summary

Quarter	1	2	3	4	Total
Spiders	0	0	0	0	0
Wildcats	7	13	0	10	30

at Villanova Stadium • Villanova, Pennsylvania

- Date: November 7
- Game time: 1:00 p.m.
- Game weather: Sunny • Temperature: 56 °F (13 °C) • Wind: NW at 15 miles per hour (24 km/h)
- Game attendance: 3,747
- Referee: Tom Zetts
- TV announcers (ESPN+): Aaron Hook (play-by-play), Steve Pinnone (analyst) and Tessa Peloso (sideline)

Game information

First quarter

- (3:50) VILL - Pat McQuaide 6-yard pass to Brandon Binkowski, Dominic LeBlanc kick (Drive: 7 Plays, 57 yards, 3:55; VILL 7–0)

Second quarter

- (12:14) VILL - Dominic LeBlanc 32-yard field goal (Drive: 9 Plays, 51 yards, 4:14; VILL 10–0)
- (5:25) VILL - Pat McQuaide 46-yard pass to Braden Reed, Dominic LeBlanc kick (Drive: 8 Plays, 75 yards, 3:59; VILL 20–0)
- (0:44) VILL - Dominic LeBlanc 41-yard field goal (Drive: 10 Plays, 29 yards, 3:30; VILL 10–0)

Third quarter

- (12:42) VILL - Pat McQuaide 19-yard pass to Ja'briel Mace, Dominic LeBlanc kick (Drive: 5 Plays, 60 yards, 2:58; VILL 27–0)

Fourth quarter

- (3:36) VILL - Dominic LeBlanc 33-yard field goal (Drive: 10 Plays, 39 yards, 6:15; VILL 30–0)

Statistics	RICH	VILL
First downs	7	21
Plays–yards	46–140	67–417
Rushes–yards	25–80	49–238
Passing yards	60	179
Passing: comp–att–int	8–21–0	12–18–0
Turnovers	0	0
Time of possession	21:22	38:38

Team	Category	Player	Statistics
Richmond	Passing	Jack Callaghan	8/21, 60 yards
Richmond	Rushing	Jack Callaghan	15 carries, 54 yards
Richmond	Receiving	Quanye Veney	3 receptions, 27 yards
Villanova	Passing	Pat McQuaide	11/17, 163 yards, 3 TD
Villanova	Rushing	Isaiah Ragaland	17 carries, 125 yards
Villanova	Receiving	Braden Reed	5 receptions, 75 yards, TD

=== at Holy Cross ===
Villanova Wildcats (6–4) at Holy Cross Crusaders (5–5) – Game summary

Quarter	1	2	Total
Wildcats			0
Crusaders			0

at Fitton Field • Worcester, Massachusetts

- Date: November 14
- Game time: 12:00 p.m.

Game information

First quarter
Second quarter
Third quarter
Fourth quarter

Statistics	VILL	HC
First downs		
Plays–yards		
Rushes–yards		
Passing yards		
Passing: comp–att–int		
Turnovers		
Time of possession		

Team	Category	Player	Statistics
Villanova	Passing		
Villanova	Rushing		
Villanova	Receiving		
Holy Cross	Passing		
Holy Cross	Rushing		
Holy Cross	Receiving		

=== Georgetown ===
Georgetown Hoyas (3–6) at Villanova Wildcats (6–5) – Game summary

Quarter	1	2	Total
Hoyas			0
Wildcats			0

at Villanova Stadium • Villanova, Pennsylvania

- Date: November 21
- Game time: 1:00 p.m.

Game information

First quarter
Second quarter
Third quarter
Fourth quarter

Statistics	GTWN	VILL
First downs		
Plays–yards		
Rushes–yards		
Passing yards		
Passing: comp–att–int		
Turnovers		
Time of possession		

Team	Category	Player	Statistics
Georgetown	Passing		
Georgetown	Rushing		
Georgetown	Receiving		
Villanova	Passing		
Villanova	Rushing		
Villanova	Receiving		

== Rankings ==
Ranking movements Legend: ██ Increase in ranking ██ Decrease in ranking RV = Received votes
	Week														
Poll	Pre	1	2	3	4	5	6	7	8	9	10	11	12	13	Final
STATS FCS	8	18	21	22	23	RV									
Coaches	7	17	18	23	22	RV									
