= Tre Richardson =

American football player (born 2004)

No. 0 – Louisville Cardinals
- Position: Wide receiver
- Class: Senior

Personal information
- Born: October 27, 2004 (age 22)
- Listed height: 5 ft 10 in (1.78 m)
- Listed weight: 175 lb (79 kg)

Career information
- High school: Highland Park (Topeka, Kansas)
- College: Hutchinson CC (2023); Washburn (2024); Vanderbilt (2025); Louisville (2026–present)

Awards and highlights
- First-team NJCAA All-American (2023); First-team All-MIAA (2024); First-team All-KJCCC (2023)
- Stats at ESPN

Tre Richardson (born October 27, 2004) is an American college football wide receiver for the Louisville Cardinals. He previously played for the Hutchinson Blue Dragons, Washburn Ichabods and Vanderbilt Commodores.

== Early life ==
Richardson attended Highland Park High School in Topeka, Kansas. In his junior season, he totaled 1,674 all-purpose yards and 23 touchdowns. Coming out of high school, Richardson committed to play college football for the New Mexico Aggies. However, he later de-committed and signed to play for the Hutchinson Blue Dragons in order to stay close to home.

== College career ==
=== Hutchinson CC ===
As a freshman in 2023, Richardson recorded eight total touchdowns, including three on special teams.

=== Washburn ===
Richardson transferred to play for the Washburn Ichabods. During his lone season at Washburn in 2024, he caught 52 passes for 983 yards and 11 touchdowns, while also returning 16 kickoffs for 386 yards. For his performance, he earned first-team all-conference honors. In addition, he competed in track and field and he was named a Division II All-American. After the conclusion of the season, Richardson entered the NCAA transfer portal.

=== Vanderbilt ===
Richardson transferred to play for the Vanderbilt Commodores. In the 2025 ReliaQuest Bowl, he recorded six receptions for 127 yards and a touchdown in a loss to Iowa.

=== Division I Statistics ===
Season	Team	GP	Receiving				Rushing				Kick Returns				Punt Returns			
Season	Team	GP	Rec	Yds	Avg	TD	Att	Yds	Avg	TD	Ret	Yds	Avg	TD	Ret	Yds	Avg	TD
2025	Vanderbilt	13	46	806	17.5	7	11	62	5.6	0	17	427	25.1	0	0	0	0	0
2026	Louisville	2	11	181	16.5	1	2	41	20.5	1	1	22	22.0	0	1	13	13.0	0
Career		15	57	987	17.3	8	13	103	7.9	1	18	449	24.9	0	1	13	13.0	
