= Malachi Nelson =

American football player (born 2003)

No. 16 – Syracuse Orange
- Position: Quarterback
- Class: (redshirt) Junior

Personal information
- Born: December 7, 2003 (age 22); Los Alamitos, California, U.S.
- Listed height: 6 ft 3 in (1.91 m)
- Listed weight: 193 lb (88 kg)

Career information
- High school: Los Alamitos
- College: USC (2023); Boise State (2024); UTEP (2025); Syracuse (2026–present)
- Stats at ESPN

Malachi Nelson (born December 7, 2003) is an American college football quarterback for the Syracuse Orange. He previously played for the USC Trojans, Boise State Broncos, and UTEP Miners.

== Early life ==
Nelson was raised in Los Alamitos, California and attended Los Alamitos High School. He began receiving scholarship offers to play college football while he was in the eighth grade. As a freshman at Los Alamitos, Nelson passed for 883 yards with eight touchdowns and five interceptions. Nelson completed 73.9% of his passes for 1,513 yards and 23 touchdowns during his sophomore season.

Nelson was rated a five-star recruit and committed to play college football at Oklahoma during the summer prior to his junior year over offers from Alabama, Florida State, LSU, Notre Dame, Ohio State, and USC. Nelson was named the Press-Telegram Player of the Year after passing for 2,690 yards and 39 touchdowns in his junior season. He decommitted shortly after the departure of Oklahoma head coach Lincoln Riley. Nelson then committed to play at USC. Nelson competed in the finals of the 2022 Elite 11 quarterback competition. Entering his senior season, he was ranked the best recruit in the nation by ESPN.

== College career ==
=== USC ===
Nelson joined the USC Trojans as an early enrollee in January 2023. He only appeared in one game, as Caleb Williams was the starter, which allowed him to redshirt and keep 4 years of college eligibility. On December 17, 2023, Nelson announced that he would be entering the transfer portal.

=== Boise State ===
On January 6, 2024, Nelson announced that he would be transferring to Boise State. Nelson competed for the starting QB position with Maddux Madsen, who won the job, and only appeared in three blowout victories for Boise State in 2024. On December 12, 2024, Nelson announced that he would enter the transfer portal and leave Boise State.

=== UTEP ===
On January 6, 2025, Nelson announced that he would be transferring to the University of Texas at El Paso. Nelson competed for the starting quarterback position with returning starter Skyler Locklear and Shay Smith.

=== Syracuse ===
On January 16, 2026, it was announced that Nelson would be transferring to Syracuse.

=== Statistics ===
Season	Team	Games			Passing								Rushing			
Season	Team	GP	GS	Record	Cmp	Att	Pct	Yds	Y/A	TD	Int	Rtg	Att	Yds	Avg	TD
2023	USC	1	0	—	1	3	33.3	0	0.0	0	0	33.3	0	0	0.0	0
2024	Boise State	3	0	—	12	17	70.6	128	7.5	0	1	122.1	2	−11	−5.5	0
2025	UTEP	6	5	1–4	104	190	54.7	1,163	6.1	8	9	110.6	23	−13	−0.6	0
2026	Syracuse	3	2	0–2	42	70	60.0	532	7.6	3	2	132.2	12	-14	-1.2	0
Career		13	7	1–6	159	280	56.8	1,823	6.5	11	12	115.9	37	-38	-1.0	0

== Personal life ==
Nelson's father, Eric, is a pastor. Nelson signed a Name, Image and Likeness (NIL) deal with a Los Angeles-based hospitality firm shortly after the conclusion of his junior year of high school.
