= Lawayne McCoy =

American football player

No. 7 – Louisville Cardinals
- Position: Wide receiver
- Class: Junior

Personal information
- Listed height: 6 ft 1 in (1.85 m)
- Listed weight: 180 lb (82 kg)

Career information
- High school: Miami Central (Miami, Florida)
- College: Florida State (2024–2025) Louisville (2026–present)
- Stats at ESPN

Lawayne McCoy is an American football wide receiver for the Louisville Cardinals. He previously played for the Florida State Seminoles.

== Early life ==
McCoy attended Miami Central Senior High School in Miami, Florida. He was rated as a four-star recruit and the 22nd overall athlete in the class of 2024 by 247Sports, and committed to play college football for the Florida State Seminoles over UCF.

== College career ==
As a freshman in 2024, McCoy had six catches for 52 yards. In 2025, he tallied 27 receptions for 396 yards and three touchdowns. After the season, McCoy entered the NCAA transfer portal.

McCoy transferred to play for the Louisville Cardinals. In week one of the 2026 season, he hauled in three passes for 102 yards and a touchdown in a win over Villanova.
