= Lincoln Kienholz =

American football player

No. 3 – Louisville Cardinals
- Position: Quarterback
- Class: Redshirt Junior

Personal information
- Born: June 5, 2004 (age 22); Pierre, South Dakota
- Listed height: 6 ft 2 in (1.88 m)
- Listed weight: 215 lb (98 kg)

Career information
- High school: T. F. Riggs (Pierre, South Dakota)
- College: Ohio State (2023–2025) Louisville (2026–present)

Awards and highlights
- CFP national champion (2024)
- Stats at ESPN

Lincoln Kienholz (KAYN-holts born June 5, 2004) is an American college football quarterback for the Louisville Cardinals. He previously played for the Ohio State Buckeyes.

== Early life ==
Kienholz grew up in Pierre, South Dakota. The son of athletes, his mother, Kacy, was a standout Volleyball athlete at O'Neill High School in Nebraska. His father, Peter, played Basketball at Southwest Minnesota State. He attended T. F. Riggs High School in Pierre, where he played football, basketball and baseball for the Governors. As a senior in football, he passed for 3,422 yards with 46 touchdowns and rushed for 1,435 yards and 24 touchdowns. Kienholz finished his career with the most passing yards in South Dakota history. He was named USA Today's National Athlete of the Year in 2023. He was selected to play in the 2023 All-American Bowl. He originally committed to play college football at the University of Washington before flipping his commitment to Ohio State University.

== College career ==
=== Ohio State ===
Kienholz entered the 2023 season as the third-string quarterback behind Kyle McCord and Devin Brown. He earned his first playing time in Week 10 against Michigan State, completing two of three passes for 18 yards in the victory. Ohio State finished the regular season 11–1, losing the regular-season finale to rival Michigan. McCord entered the transfer portal before the bowl game, with Brown taking over as the starting quarterback and Kienholz moving into the primary backup role. Brown was injured in the first half of the 2023 Cotton Bowl Classic against No. 9 Missouri, forcing Kienholz into the game. He completed six of 18 passes for 86 yards as the Buckeyes struggled to generate offense in a 14–3 loss. Kienholz appeared in three games during the season, completing 10 of 22 passes for 111 yards while preserving his redshirt eligibility.

Kienholz entered the 2024 season as Ohio State's fourth-string quarterback, behind transfer Will Howard, Brown, and freshman Julian Sayin. He appeared in two games without recording a statistic, including the Buckeyes' College Football Playoff quarterfinal victory over Tennessee in the Cotton Bowl, en route to a national championship.

Following Howard's departure to the NFL and Brown's transfer to California, Kienholz competed with Sayin and Tavien St. Clair for the starting position. Sayin won the job, with Kienholz serving as the primary backup. Kienholz made his season debut in Week 2 against Grambling State, completing six of seven passes for 71 yards and his first collegiate touchdown, a pass to Jelani Thurman, in a 70–0 victory. He appeared in seven games during the season, completing 11 of 14 passes for 139 yards and a touchdown while adding 66 rushing yards and two touchdowns. On January 1, 2026, Kienholz entered the NCAA transfer portal.

=== Louisville ===
On January 3, 2026, Keinholz committed to the Louisville Cardinals. Kienholz was named the Cardinals' starting quarterback ahead of the 2026 season.

=== College statistics ===
Year	Team	Games			Passing								Rushing			
Year	Team	GP	GS	Record	Cmp	Att	Pct	Yds	Y/A	TD	Int	Rtg	Att	Yds	Avg	TD
2023	Ohio State	3	0	—	10	22	45.5	111	5.0	0	0	87.8	6	2	0.3	0
2024	Ohio State	2	0	—	0	0	0.0	0	0.0	0	0	0.0	0	0	0.0	0
2025	Ohio State	7	0	—	11	14	78.6	139	9.9	1	0	185.5	11	66	6.0	2
2026	Louisville	10	10	7–3	181	264	68.6	2,430	9.2	15	3	162.4	97	408	4.2	11
Career		22	10	7–3	202	300	67.3	2,680	8.9	16	3	158.0	114	476	4.2	13
