= Umari Hatcher =

American football player (born 2002)

- Hatcher before a game in 2024.

No. 2 – Syracuse Orange
- Position: Wide receiver
- Class: Sixth-Year Senior

Personal information
- Born: October 2, 2002 (age 24); Woodbridge, Virginia, U.S.
- Listed height: 6 ft 3 in (1.91 m)
- Listed weight: 190 lb (86 kg)

Career information
- High school: Freedom (Woodbridge, Virginia)
- College: Syracuse (2021–present)
- Stats at ESPN

Umari Hatcher (born October 2, 2002) is an American college football wide receiver for the Syracuse Orange.

== Early life ==
Hatcher was born on October 2, 2002, in Woodbridge, Virginia, and attended Freedom High School in Woodbridge where he played football. In high school, he twice served as team captain and posted 1,900 receiving yards as a wide receiver. In his junior year, Hatcher was part of a team that compiled a record of 11–1 while totaling 56 catches for 1,400 yards and 17 touchdowns, earning first-team all-state honors. He had 206 receiving yards as a senior in a COVID-19-impacted season. A three-star recruit, Hatcher committed to play college football for the Syracuse Orange.

== College career ==
Hatcher redshirted as a true freshman at Syracuse in 2021 and appeared in four games, then had three receptions for 42 yards and a touchdown while playing in eight games during the 2022 season. He was the second-leading receiver for the Orange in 2023, catching 32 passes for 482 yards and three touchdowns. In 2024, Hatcher had 17 receptions for 273 yards and three touchdowns. However, he missed the end of the season after tearing two knee ligaments. He missed almost the entire 2025 season due to injury as well.

After initially entering the NCAA transfer portal, Hatcher decided to return to Syracuse for a final season in 2026. He became the team's top receiver and was named Atlantic Coast Conference (ACC) Receiver of the Week after posting 12 catches for 152 yards and three touchdowns in a win over UConn in the fourth game of the season.
