= Damon Ferguson Jr. =

American football player

No. 26 – Pittsburgh Panthers
- Position: Running back
- Class: Freshman

Personal information
- Listed height: 5 ft 11 in (1.80 m)
- Listed weight: 190 lb (86 kg)

Career information
- High school: Milford Mill Academy (Baltimore, Maryland)
- College: Pittsburgh (2026–present)
- Stats at ESPN

Damon Ferguson Jr. is an American college football running back for the Pittsburgh Panthers.

== Early life ==
Ferguson is from Gwynn Oak, Maryland, and attended Milford Mill Academy, where he competed in football and track and field. In football, he played as a running back and cornerback. As a junior, Ferguson helped Milford Mill to the Baltimore County championship while running for 1,341 yards and 16 touchdowns, earning first-team All-Metro honors. He then ran for 885 yards and 12 touchdowns as a senior, concluding his high school career with 2,951 rushing yards and 36 touchdowns. A four-star recruit, Ferguson received close to 40 scholarship offers to play college football. He committed to play for the Pittsburgh Panthers.

== College career ==
Ferguson earned his first start in the second game of his true freshman season at Pittsburgh in 2026, running for 59 yards and scoring a touchdown. He was named the Atlantic Coast Conference (ACC) Rookie of the Week after his next game, when he ran for 102 yards and a touchdown against Syracuse.
