= 2026 UConn Huskies football team =

American college football season

2026 UConn Huskies football
- Conference: Independent
- Record: 6–5
- Head coach: Jason Candle (1st season)
- Offensive coordinator: Nunzio Campanile (1st season)
- Offensive scheme: Spread
- Defensive coordinator: Ryan Manalac (1st season)
- Base defense: 4–3
- Home stadium: Pratt & Whitney Stadium at Rentschler Field

2026 NCAA Division I FBS independents football records
	Conf.			Overall
Team	W		L	W		L
No. 6 Notre Dame		–		10	–	1
UConn		–		6	–	5
As of November 22, 2026; Rankings from CFP rankings

The 2026 UConn Huskies football team represents the University of Connecticut (UConn) as an independent during the 2026 NCAA Division I FBS football season. The team will be led by first year head coach Jason Candle, replacing Jim Mora who left to take the head coaching job at Colorado State. The Huskies play at Pratt & Whitney Stadium at Rentschler Field in East Hartford, Connecticut.

== Schedule ==
Date	Time	Opponent	Site	TV	Result	Attendance
September 5	12:00 p.m.	Lafayette	Pratt & Whitney Stadium at Rentschler Field; East Hartford, CT	WWAX/WFSB	W 56–7	31,831
September 12	3:30 p.m.	Maryland	Pratt & Whitney Stadium at Rentschler Field; East Hartford, CT	CBSSN	L 14–38	34,494
September 19	7:00 p.m.	at Southern Miss	M. M. Roberts Stadium; Hattiesburg, MS	ESPN+	W 48–20	23,025
September 26	3:30 p.m.	at Miami (OH)	Yager Stadium; Oxford, OH	ESPN+	L 21–24	18,180
October 3	12:00 p.m.	Syracuse	Pratt & Whitney Stadium at Rentschler Field; East Hartford, CT (rivalry)	CBSSN	L 41–42 ^{OT}	35,883
October 10	3:45 p.m.	at Temple	Lincoln Financial Field; Philadelphia, PA	ESPNU	W 34–20	21,112
October 23	7:00 p.m.	UMass	Pratt & Whitney Stadium at Rentschler Field; East Hartford, CT (rivalry)	CBSSN	W 35–16	32,106
October 31	2:00 p.m.	at Air Force	Falcon Stadium; USAF Academy, CO	MW+	L 26–35	20,062
November 7	12:00 p.m.	North Carolina	Pratt & Whitney Stadium at Rentschler Field; East Hartford, CT	CBSSN	L 21–38	36,901
November 14	12:00 p.m.	James Madison	Pratt & Whitney Stadium at Rentschler Field; East Hartford, CT	CBSSN	W 46–22	25,530
November 21	3:30 p.m.	Old Dominion	Pratt & Whitney Stadium at Rentschler Field; East Hartford, CT	CBSSN	W 29–21	27,006
November 28	12:00 p.m.	at Wyoming	War Memorial Stadium; Laramie, WY	FS1		
Rankings from AP Poll and CFP Rankings released prior to game; All times are in Eastern time; Source:

== Game summaries ==
=== Lafayette (FCS) ===
Lafayette Leopards (FCS) (0–0) at UConn Huskies (0–0) – Game summary

Quarter	1	2	3	4	Total
Leopards (FCS)	0	0	0	7	7
Huskies	21	14	14	7	56

at Rentschler Field • East Hartford, Connecticut

- Date: September 5
- Game time: 12:03 p.m.
- Game weather: Sunny • Temperature: 75 °F (24 °C) • Wind: N at 8 miles per hour (13 km/h)
- Game attendance: 31,831
- Referee: Garrett Dickerson
- TV announcers (WFSB): Randy Brochu, Marc Robbins and Dan Booth
- Box Score

Game information

First quarter

- CONN - Javon Brown 24-yard pass from Kalieb Osborne (Jack O'Connor kick), 12:50. Huskies 7–0. Drive: 6 plays, 75 yards, 02:10.
- CONN - Kenji Christian 18-yard pass from Kalieb Osborne (Jack O'Connor kick), 7:15. Huskies 14–0. Drive: 9 plays, 71 yards, 03:41.
- CONN - Kalieb Osborne 9-yard run (Jack O'Connor kick), 1:43. Huskies 21–0. Drive: 8 plays, 45 yards, 04:15.

Second quarter

- CONN - Cyncir Bowers 16-yard run (Jack O'Connor kick), 9:14. Huskies 28–0. Drive: 7 plays, 52 yards, 02:42.
- CONN - Kenji Christian 25-yard run (Jack O'Connor kick), 2:36. Huskies 35–0. Drive: 2 plays, 16 yards, 00:30.

Third quarter

- CONN - Kalieb Osborne 11-yard run (Jack O'Connor kick), 10:37. Huskies 42–0. Drive: 7 plays, 80 yards, 03:17.
- CONN - Trey Cornist 55-yard run (Jack O'Connor kick), 2:36. Huskies 49–0. Drive: 5 plays, 85 yards, 02:03.

Fourth quarter

- CONN - Raymond Liggins III 60-yard pass from Tucker McDonald (Jack O'Connor kick), 3:07. Huskies 56–0. Drive: 4 plays, 80 yards, 02:07.
- LAF - Payton Greer 2-yard run (Jack Simonetta kick), 0:44. Huskies 56–7. Drive: 8 plays, 75 yards, 02:23.

Statistics	LAF	CONN
First downs	19	29
Plays–yards	72–209	73–671
Rushes–yards	30–64	40–301
Passing yards	145	370
Passing: comp–att–int	21–42–0	25–33–2
Turnovers	0	2
Time of possession	28:18	31:42

Team	Category	Player	Statistics
Lafayette	Passing	Daniel Lipovski	16/33, 102 yards
Lafayette	Rushing	Malachi Gamble	6 carries, 28 yards
Lafayette	Receiving	Nick Bierman	4 receptions, 30 yards
Lafayette	Defense	Dhonte Jackson	8 tackles
UConn	Passing	Kalieb Osborne	19/26, 265 yards, 2 TD, INT
UConn	Rushing	Kalieb Osborne	8 carries, 90 yards, 2 TD
UConn	Receiving	Javon Brown	6 receptions, 92 yards, TD
UConn	Defense	K'von Sherman	5 tackles, 1 sack

=== Maryland ===
Maryland Terrapins (1–0) at UConn Huskies (1–0) – Game summary

Quarter	1	2	3	4	Total
Terrapins	7	10	14	7	38
Huskies	7	0	7	0	14

at Rentschler Field • East Hartford, Connecticut

- Date: September 12
- Game time: 3:33 p.m.
- Game weather: Sunny • Temperature: 77 °F (25 °C) • Wind: S at 8 miles per hour (13 km/h)
- Game attendance: 34,494
- Referee: Jeff Servinski
- TV announcers (CBSSN): Jordan Kent, Ben DiNucci, Doug Pederson and Brandon Baylor
- Box Score

Game information

First quarter

- CONN - JD Willoughby 36-yard pass from Kalieb Osborne (Jack O'Connor kick), 4:39. Huskies 7–0. Drive: 3 plays, 47 yards, 01:21.
- MD - Na'eem Abdul-Rahim Gladding 60-yard pass from Malik Washington (Sean O'Haire kick), 3:24. Tied 7–7. Drive: 4 plays, 75 yards, 01:15.

Second quarter

- MD - Harry Dalton III 4-yard run (Sean O'Haire kick), 7:51. Terrapins 14–7. Drive: 9 plays, 92 yards, 05:09.
- MD - Sean O'Haire 19-yard field goal, 0:04. Terrapins 17–7. Drive: 15 plays, 91 yards, 03:52.

Third quarter

- MD - Iverson Howard 1-yard run (Sean O'Haire kick), 8:42. Terrapins 24–7. Drive: 10 plays, 71 yards, 04:53.
- CONN - Shamar Porter 39-yard pass from Kalieb Osborne (Jack O'Connor kick), 5:29. Terrapins 24–14. Drive: 7 plays, 77 yards, 03:04.
- MD - Harry Dalton III 2-yard run (Sean O'Haire kick), 1:53. Terrapins 31–14. Drive: 8 plays, 75 yards, 03:37.

Fourth quarter

- MD - Chris Durr Jr. 13-yard pass from Malik Washington (Sean O'Haire kick), 10:57. Terrapins 38–14. Drive: 2 plays, 18 yards, 00:41.

Statistics	MD	CONN
First downs	27	12
Plays–yards	78–475	52–223
Rushes–yards	36–125	31–67
Passing yards	350	156
Passing: comp–att–int	35–42–0	10–21–0
Turnovers	0	1
Time of possession	35:31	24:29

Team	Category	Player	Statistics
Maryland	Passing	Malik Washington	34/41, 347 yards, 2 TD
Maryland	Rushing	Iverson Howard	14 carries, 55 yards, TD
Maryland	Receiving	Na'eem Abdul-rahim Gladding	8 receptions, 130 yards, TD
Maryland	Defense	Sidney Stewart	6 tackles, 1 sack, 1 FF
UConn	Passing	Kalieb Osborne	10/21, 156 yards, 2 TD
UConn	Rushing	Kalieb Osborne	13 carries, 30 yards
UConn	Receiving	Shamar Porter	3 receptions, 62 yards, TD
UConn	Defense	Zion Paret	12 tackles

=== at Southern Miss ===
UConn Huskies (1–1) at Southern Miss Golden Eagles (1–1) – Game summary

Quarter	1	2	3	4	Total
Huskies	14	13	14	7	48
Golden Eagles	3	3	7	7	20

at M. M. Roberts Stadium • Hattiesburg, Mississippi

- Date: September 19
- Game time: 7:02 p.m. EDT
- Game weather: Sunny • Temperature: 95 °F (35 °C) • Wind: W at 2 miles per hour (3.2 km/h)
- Game attendance: 23,025
- Referee: Tim Hedgepeth
- TV announcers (ESPN+): Jason Baker & Larry Boyd
- Box Score

Game information

First quarter

- CONN - Porter, Shamar 38 yd pass from Osborne, Kalieb (O'Connor, Jack kick), 10:11. Huskies 7–0. Drive: 9 plays, 75 yards, TOP 04:49
- CONN - Osborne, Kalieb 5 yd run (O'Connor, Jack kick), 6:19. Huskies 14–0. Drive: 7 plays, 46 yards, TOP 02:48
- USM - Wilbanks, Creighton 47 yd field goal, 0:30. Huskies 14–3. Drive: 10 plays, 51 yards, TOP 02:49

Second quarter

- CONN - O'Connor, Jack 46 yd field goal, 11:05. Huskies 17–3. Drive: 11 plays, 47 yards, TOP 04:23
- CONN - Bowers, Cyncir 42 yd run (O'Connor, Jack kick), 8:47. Huskies 24–3. Drive: 3 plays, 63 yards, TOP 01:06
- USM - Wilbanks, Creighton 34 yd field goal, 3:15. Huskies 24–6. Drive: 15 plays, 59 yards, TOP 05:32
- CONN - O'Connor, Jack 29 yd field goal, 0:00. Huskies 27–6. Drive: 6 plays, 52 yards, TOP 00:33

Third quarter

- CONN - Cornist, Trey 1 yd pass from Osborne, Kalieb (O'Connor, Jack kick), 7:26. Huskies 34–6. Drive: 11 plays, 59 yards, TOP 06:01
- CONN - Luqman, Anas 24 yd interception return (O'Connor, Jack kick), 7:17. Huskies 41–6. Drive: 1 play, 24 yards
- USM - Robinson, Steven 1 yd run (Wilbanks, Creighton kick), 5:53. Huskies 41–13. Drive: 4 plays, 75 yards, TOP 01:24

Fourth quarter

- CONN - Osborne, Kalieb 11 yd run (O'Connor, Jack kick), 8:16. Huskies 48–13. Drive: 5 plays, 51 yards, TOP 02:46
- USM - Himes, Jaylen 10 yd pass from Lyddy, Landry (Wilbanks, Creighton kick), 0:23. Huskies 48–20. Drive: 7 plays, 80 yards, TOP 01:55

Statistics	CONN	USM
First downs	24	21
Plays–yards	71–436	78–401
Rushes–yards	46–213	27–102
Passing yards	223	299
Passing: comp–att–int	18–25–0	29–51–2
Turnovers	0	2
Time of possession	34:04	25:56

Team	Category	Player	Statistics
UConn	Passing	Kalieb Osborne	16/22, 214 yards, 2 TDs
UConn	Rushing	Cyncir Bowers	11 att, 84 yards, 1 TD
UConn	Receiving	Shamar Porter	2 rec, 50 yards, 1 TD
UConn	Defense	Hayden Pegg	8 tackles
Southern Miss	Passing	Landry Lyddy	14/25, 194 yards, 1 TD
Southern Miss	Rushing	Steven Robinson	18 att, 72 yards, 1 TD
Southern Miss	Receiving	Mario Sanders	7 rec, 81 yards
Southern Miss	Defense	Michael Robinson III	10 tackles

=== at Miami (OH) ===
UConn Huskies (2–1) at Miami RedHawks (1–2) – Game summary

Quarter	1	2	3	4	Total
Huskies	14	0	7	0	21
RedHawks	0	17	7	3	27

at Yager Stadium • Oxford, Ohio

- Date: September 26
- Game time: 3:30 p.m. EDT
- Game weather: Sunny • Temperature: 70 °F (21 °C) • Wind: SW at 8 miles per hour (13 km/h)
- Game attendance: 18,180
- Referee: Rich Edwards
- TV announcers (ESPN+): Shawn Kenney and Marcus Ray
- Box Score

Game information

First quarter

- CONN - Brown, Javon 7 yd pass from Osborne, Kalieb (O'Connor, Jack kick), 11:04. Huskies 7–0. Drive: 8 plays, 75 yards, TOP 03:56
- CONN - Osborne, Kalieb 38 yd run (O'Connor, Jack kick), 6:23. Huskies 14–0. Drive: 8 plays, 84 yards, TOP 03:38

Second quarter

- MIA - McComb, David 10 yd run (McLaughlin, Kellan kick), 6:08. Huskies 14–7. Drive: 8 plays, 90 yards, TOP 04:46
- MIA - Loftus, Brendan 57 yd pass from McComb, David (McLaughlin, Kellan kick), 1:50. Tied 14–14. Drive: 4 plays, 87 yards, TOP 01:17

Third quarter

- MIA - Smith, Scoop 11 yd pass from McComb, David (McLaughlin, Kellan kick), 3:48. RedHawks 21–14. Drive: 9 plays, 83 yards, TOP 04:23
- CONN - Bowers, Cyncir 1 yd run (O'Connor, Jack kick), 0:49. Tied 21–21. Drive: 5 plays, 64 yards, TOP 02:52

Fourth quarter

- MIA - Stidham, Brady 33 yd field goal, 1:58. RedHawks 24–21. Drive: 11 plays, 28 yards, TOP 06:49

Statistics	CONN	M-OH
First downs	17	20
Plays–yards	62–377	61–414
Rushes–yards	30–162	29–89
Passing yards	215	325
Passing: comp–att–int	17–32–1	22–32–0
Turnovers	2	1
Time of possession	27:18	32:42

Team	Category	Player	Statistics
UConn	Passing	Kalieb Osborne	17/32, 215 yards, 1 TD
UConn	Rushing	Kalieb Osborne	13 att, 84 yards, 1 TD
UConn	Receiving	Shamar Porter	2 rec, 61 yards
UConn	Defense	Hayden Pegg	8 tackles
Miami (OH)	Passing	David McComb	19/29, 312 yards, 2 TDs
Miami (OH)	Rushing	David McComb	3 att, 33 yards, 1 TD
Miami (OH)	Receiving	Brendan Loftus	3 rec, 72 yards, 1 TD
Miami (OH)	Defense	Malcolm McCain	9 tackles

=== Syracuse (rivalry) ===
Syracuse Orange (1–2) at UConn Huskies (2–2) – Game summary

Quarter	1	2	3	4	OT	Total
Orange	6	21	7	0	8	42
Huskies	7	7	6	14	7	41

at Rentschler Field • East Hartford, Connecticut

- Date: October 3
- Game time: 12:02 PM EDT
- Game weather: Sunny • Temperature: 67 °F (19 °C) • Wind: NE at 8 miles per hour (13 km/h)
- Game attendance: 35,883
- Referee: Garrett Dickerson
- TV announcers (CBSSN): Jack Gordon, Taylor McHargue & Jaclyn DeAugustina
- Box Score

Game information

First quarter

- CUSE - Hatcher, Umari 40 yd pass from Odom, Amari (kick no good), 11:45. Orange 6–0. Drive: 7 plays, 70 yards, TOP 02:34
- CONN - Abshire, Cam 8 yd pass from Osborne, Kalieb (O'Connor, Jack kick), 9:31. Huskies 7–6. Drive: 7 plays, 75 yards, TOP 02:14

Second quarter

- CUSE - Meyers, Noah 4 yd pass from Odom, Amari (Barker, Shay kick), 13:39. Orange 13–7. Drive: 8 plays, 78 yards, TOP 04:04
- CUSE - Odom, Amari 6 yd run (Barker, Shay kick), 9:22. Orange 20–7. Drive: 5 plays, 47 yards, TOP 02:02
- CUSE - Hatcher, Umari 41 yd pass from Odom, Amari (Barker, Shay kick), 3:19. Orange 27–7. Drive: 7 plays, 79 yards, TOP 03:27
- CONN - Cornist, Trey 4 yd run (O'Connor, Jack kick), 0:11. Orange 27–14. Drive: 8 plays, 72 yards, TOP 01:34

Third quarter

- CUSE - Bacheyie, Daunte 34 yd pass from Odom, Amari (Barker, Shay kick), 7:58. Orange 34–14. Drive: 14 plays, 75 yards, TOP 07:02
- CONN - Bowers, Cyncir 10 yd run (kick no good), 3:46. Orange 34–20. Drive: 14 plays, 75 yards, TOP 04:12

Fourth quarter

- CONN - Watson, Xavier 7 yd pass from Osborne, Kalieb (O'Connor, Jack kick), 14:55. Orange 34–27. Drive: 3 plays, 43 yards, TOP 00:25
- CONN - Bowers, Cyncir 71 yd run (O'Connor, Jack kick), 11:52. Tied 34–34. Drive: 2 plays, 84 yards, TOP 00:34

First Overtime

- CONN - Cornist, Trey 25 yd pass from Osborne, Kalieb (O'Connor, Jack kick), 0:00. Huskies 41–34. Drive: 2 plays, 25 yards, TOP 00:00
- CUSE - Hatcher, Umari 17 yd pass from Odom, Amari (Odom, Amari rush), 0:00. Orange 42–41. Drive: 6 plays, 25 yards, TOP 00:00

Statistics	SYR	CONN
First downs	29	28
Plays–yards	85–509	74–499
Rushes–yards	48–174	34–181
Passing yards	335	318
Passing: comp–att–int	27–37–2	20–40–0
Turnovers	2	2
Time of possession	35:27	24:33

Team	Category	Player	Statistics
Syracuse	Passing	Amari Odom	27/37, 355 yards, 5 TDs
Syracuse	Rushing	Tylik Hill	28 att, 140 yards
Syracuse	Receiving	Umari Hatcher	12 rec, 152 yards, 3 TDs
Syracuse	Defense	Chris D'appolonia	9 tackles
UConn	Passing	Kalieb Osborne	19/39, 314 yards, 3 TDs
UConn	Rushing	Cyncir Bowers	16 att, 163 yards, 2 TDs
UConn	Receiving	Ryder Treadway	3 rec, 57 yards
UConn	Defense	K'von Sherman	12 tackles, 1 sack, 2 FFs

=== at Temple ===
UConn Huskies (2–3) at Temple Owls (2–3) – Game summary

Quarter	1	2	3	4	Total
Huskies	14	10	0	10	34
Owls	14	3	3	0	20

at Lincoln Financial Field • Philadelphia, Pennsylvania

- Date: October 10
- Game time: 3:50 PM EDT
- Game weather: Sunny • Temperature: 73 °F (23 °C) • Wind: SE at 6 miles per hour (9.7 km/h)
- Game attendance: 21,112
- Referee: Edwin Lee
- TV announcers (ESPNU): Ted Emrich & Fozzy Whittaker
- Box Score

Game information

First quarter

- CONN - Osborne, Kalieb 12 yd run (O'Connor, Jack kick), 12:43. Huskies 7–0. Drive: 6 plays, 75 yards, TOP 02:17
- TEM - Bermudez, Jojo 79 yd pass from Sheppard, Ajani (Hardin, Carl kick), 12:28. Tied 7–7. Drive: 1 plays, 79 yards, TOP 00:10
- CONN - Christian, Kenji 39 yd run (O'Connor, Jack kick), 10:18. Huskies 14–7. Drive: 5 plays, 75 yards, TOP 02:10
- TEM - Clarke, Peter 29 yd pass from Chase, Colin (Hardin, Carl kick), 4:43. Tied 14–14. Drive: 10 plays, 80 yards, TOP 05:31

Second quarter

- TEM - Hardin, Carl 26 yd field goal, 8:13. Owls 17–14. Drive: 12 plays, 82 yards, TOP 07:02
- CONN - Cornist, Trey 1 yd run (O'Connor, Jack kick), 5:55. Huskies 21–17. Drive: 5 plays, 75 yards, TOP 02:18
- CONN - O'Connor, Jack 21 yd field goal, 0:00. Huskies 24–17. Drive: 9 plays, 75 yards, TOP 01:52

Third quarter

- TEM - Hardin, Carl 29 yd field goal, 2:42. Huskies 24–20. Drive: 9 plays, 61 yards, TOP 04:17

Fourth quarter

- CONN - Bowers, Cyncir 8 yd run (O'Connor, Jack kick), 7:52. Huskies 31–20. Drive: 10 plays, 62 yards, TOP 04:16
- CONN - O'Connor, Jack 27 yd field goal, 1:05. Huskies 34–20. Drive: 10 plays, 48 yards, TOP 05:19

Statistics	CONN	TEM
First downs	23	21
Plays–yards	63–505	60–437
Rushes–yards	39–248	34–148
Passing yards	257	289
Passing: comp–att–int	17–24–0	20–26–0
Turnovers	0	2
Time of possession	28:58	31:02

Team	Category	Player	Statistics
UConn	Passing	Kalieb Osborne	17/23, 257 yards
UConn	Rushing	Trey Cornist	7 att, 114 yards, 1 TD
UConn	Receiving	Ryder Treadway	3 rec, 63 yards
UConn	Defense	John Lista	8 tackles
Temple	Passing	Ajani Sheppard	19/25, 260 yards, 1 TD
Temple	Rushing	Keveun Mason	13 att, 88 yards
Temple	Receiving	Jojo Bermudez	2 rec, 96 yards, 1 TD
Temple	Defense	Avery Powell	8 tackles

=== UMass (rivalry) ===
UMass Minutemen (4–3) at UConn Huskies (3–3) – Game summary

Quarter	1	2	3	4	Total
Minutemen	3	0	0	13	16
Huskies	7	14	7	7	35

at Rentschler Field • East Hartford, Connecticut

- Date: October 23
- Game time: 7:03 p.m.
- Game weather: Clear • Temperature: 50 °F (10 °C) • Wind: N at 4 miles per hour (6.4 km/h)
- Game attendance: 32,106
- Referee: Nolan Dumas
- TV announcers (CBSSN): Jack Gordon, Taylor McHargue & Hailey Sutton
- Box Score

Game information

First quarter

- MASS - Morris, Derek 24 yd field goal, 7:03. Minutemen 3–0. Drive: 13 plays, 69 yards, TOP 07:57
- CONN - Porter, Shamar 5 yd pass from Osborne, Kalieb (O'Connor, Jack kick), 1:13. Huskies 7–3. Drive: 13 plays, 75 yards, TOP 05:50

Second quarter

- CONN - Willoughby, JD 20 yd pass from Osborne, Kalieb (O'Connor, Jack kick), 1:36. Huskies 14–3. Drive: 4 plays, 45 yards, TOP 01:07
- CONN - Bowers, Cyncir 70 yd run (O'Connor, Jack kick), 1:04. Huskies 21–3. Drive: 1 plays, 70 yards, TOP 00:12

Third quarter

- CONN - Porter, Shamar 0 yd punt return (O'Connor, Jack kick), 6:44. Huskies 28–3. Drive: 1 play, 0 yards

Fourth quarter

- MASS - Kimmons IV, Curtis 7 yd pass from Watson III, William (Pass no good), 14:17. Huskies 28–9. Drive: 6 plays, 71 yards, TOP 02:41
- CONN - Osborne, Kalieb 13 yd run (O'Connor, Jack kick), 3:04. Huskies 35–9. Drive: 9 plays, 41 yards, TOP 05:05
- MASS - Williams-Thomas, Justin 6 yd run (Morris, Derek kick), 1:09. Huskies 35–16. Drive: 9 plays, 57 yards, TOP 01:48

Statistics	MASS	CONN
First downs	14	21
Plays–yards	66–303	65–438
Rushes–yards	22–53	46–265
Passing yards	250	173
Passing: comp–att–int	26–44–0	14–19–0
Turnovers	0	0
Time of possession	25:45	34:15

Team	Category	Player	Statistics
UMass	Passing	William Watson III	22/38, 205 yards, TD
UMass	Rushing	Elijah Faulkner	6 att, 15 yards
UMass	Receiving	Joseph Griffin Jr.	4 rec, 77 yards
UMass	Defense	Kendall Bournes	8 tackles
UConn	Passing	Kalieb Osborne	14/19, 173 yards, 2 TDs
UConn	Rushing	Cyncir Bowers	15 att, 131 yards, TD
UConn	Receiving	JD Willoughby	3 rec, 65 yards, TD
UConn	Defense	Hayden Pegg	7 tackles

=== at Air Force ===
UConn Huskies (4–3) at Air Force Falcons (5–2) – Game summary

Quarter	1	2	3	4	Total
Huskies	0	14	6	6	26
Falcons	14	7	7	7	35

at Falcon Stadium • Air Force Academy, Colorado

- Date: October 31
- Game time: 3:05 p.m. EDT
- Game weather: Sunny • Temperature: 62 °F (17 °C) • Wind: S at 8 miles per hour (13 km/h)
- Game attendance: 20,062
- Referee: Riley Johnson
- TV announcers (MW+): Josh Howe & Ryan Kaufman
- Box Score

Game information

First quarter

- AF - Hodges, Kemper 7 yd run (Cremascoli, Carter kick), 8:43. Falcons 7–0. Drive: 10 plays, 55 yards, TOP 05:25
- AF - Hodges, Kemper 62 yd run (Cremascoli, Carter kick), 1:27. Falcons 14–0. Drive: 2 plays, 67 yards, TOP 00:45

Second quarter

- CONN - Cornist, Trey 1 yd run (O'Connor, Jack kick), 11:55. Falcons 14–7. Drive: 10 plays, 75 yards, TOP 04:32
- AF - Hodges, Kemper 3 yd run (Cremascoli, Carter kick), 5:53. Falcons 21–7. Drive: 11 plays, 77 yards, TOP 05:57
- CONN - Treadway, Ryder 2 yd pass from Osborne, Kalieb (O'Connor, Jack kick), 1:56. Falcons 21–14. Drive: 10 plays, 75 yards, TOP 03:57

Third quarter

- AF - LaDue, Gage 4 yd run (Cremascoli, Carter kick), 2:34. Falcons 28–14. Drive: 16 plays, 81 yards, TOP 09:40
- CONN - Godavitarne, Alex 55 yd pass from Osborne, Kalieb (Kick no good), 2:04. Falcons 28–20. Drive: 2 plays, 75 yards, TOP 00:30

Fourth quarter

- CONN - Christian, Kenji 46 yd run (Pass no good), 14:46. Falcons 28–26. Drive: 4 plays, 87 yards, TOP 00:54
- AF - Hodges, Kemper 1 yd run (Cremascoli, Carter kick), 3:09. Falcons 35–26. Drive: 19 plays, 75 yards, TOP 11:37

Statistics	CONN	AFA
First downs	18	24
Plays–yards	54–368	77–366
Rushes–yards	21–105	74–366
Passing yards	263	0
Passing: comp–att–int	17–33–0	0–3–0
Turnovers	0	0
Time of possession	18:06	41:54

Team	Category	Player	Statistics
UConn	Passing	Kalieb Osborne	17/33, 263 yards, 2 TDs
UConn	Rushing	Kenji Christian	5 att, 68 yards, 1 TD
UConn	Receiving	Alex Godavitarne	1 rec, 55 yards, 1 TD
UConn	Defense	John Lista	15 tackles
Air Force	Passing	Kemper Hodges	0/1, 0 yards
Air Force	Rushing	Kemper Hodges	35 att, 200 yards, 4 TDs
Air Force	Receiving	N/A	N/A
Air Force	Defense	Matt Mustell	8 tackles

=== North Carolina ===
North Carolina Tar Heels (4–4) at UConn Huskies (4–4) – Game summary

Quarter	1	2	3	4	Total
Tar Heels	7	21	3	7	38
Huskies	0	14	7	0	21

at Rentschler Field • East Hartford, Connecticut

- Date: November 7
- Game time: 12:03 p.m.
- Game weather: Cloudy • Temperature: 62 °F (17 °C) • Wind: NW at 5 miles per hour (8.0 km/h)
- Game attendance: 36,901
- Referee: Mike Roche
- TV announcers (CBSSN): Jordan Kent (play-by-play), Robert Turbin (analyst) & Tiffany Blackmon (reporter)
- Box Score

Game information

First quarter

- UNC - Hickman-Collins, Timir 62 yd interception return (Verhoff,Rece kick), 5:29. Tar Heels 7–0. Drive: 1 play, 62 yards, TOP 00:00

Second quarter

- CONN - Treadway, Ryder 18 yd pass from Osborne, Kalieb (O'Connor, Jack kick), 13:42. Tied 7–7. Drive: 6 plays, 53 yards, TOP 03:00
- UNC - Hall, Benjamin 39 yd run (Verhoff, Rece kick), 10:05. Tar Heels 14–7. Drive: 7 plays, 86 yards, TOP 03:31
- UNC - Shipp, Jordan 6 yd pass from Edwards Jr., Billy (Verhoff, Rece kick), 7:41. Tar Heels 21–7. Drive: 4 plays, 22 yards, TOP 01:34
- CONN - Abshire, Cam 24 yd pass from Osborne, Kalieb (O'Connor, Jack kick), 6:33. Tar Heels 21–14. Drive: 5 plays, 75 yards, TOP 01:08
- UNC - Thurman, Jelani 3 yd pass from Edwards Jr., Billy (Verhoff, Rece kick), 0:24. Tar Heels 28–14. Drive: 16 plays, 75 yards, TOP 06:09

Third quarter

- CONN - Bowers, Cyncir 13 yd run (O'Connor, Jack kick), 10:02. Tar Heels 28–21. Drive: 7 plays, 93 yards, TOP 02:19
- UNC - Verhoff, Rece 27 yd field goal, 6:05. Tar Heels 31–21. Drive: 8 plays, 66 yards, TOP 03:56

Fourth quarter

- UNC - Thurman, Jelani 3 yd pass from Edwards Jr., Billy (Verhoff, Rece kick), 3:38. Tar Heels 38–21. Drive: 8 plays, 32 yards, TOP 03:37

Statistics	UNC	CONN
First downs	23	19
Plays–yards	74–419	66–368
Rushes–yards	36–164	31–123
Passing yards	255	245
Passing: comp–att–int	29–38–1	17–35–2
Turnovers	1	3
Time of possession	36:23	23:37

Team	Category	Player	Statistics
North Carolina	Passing	Billy Edwards Jr.	29/38, 255 yards, 3 TDs
North Carolina	Rushing	Benjamin Hall	9 att, 81 yards, 1 TD
North Carolina	Receiving	Jelani Thurman	7 rec, 64 yards, 2 TDs
North Carolina	Defense	Peyton Seelmann	9 tackles, 2 sacks
UConn	Passing	Kalieb Osborne	17/35, 245 yards, 2 TDs
UConn	Rushing	Cyncir Bowers	13 att, 68 yards, 1 TD
UConn	Receiving	Ryder Treadway	4 rec, 82 yards, 1 TD
UConn	Defense	Hayden Pegg	12 tackles, 1 int

=== James Madison ===
James Madison Dukes (8–2) at UConn Huskies (4–5) – Game summary

Quarter	1	2	3	4	Total
Dukes	6	7	0	9	22
Huskies	10	10	6	20	46

at Rentschler Field • East Hartford, Connecticut

- Date: November 14
- Game time: 12:03 p.m.
- Game weather: Cloudy • Temperature: 45 °F (7 °C) • Wind: NW at 9 miles per hour (14 km/h)
- Game attendance: 25,530
- Referee: Nolan Dumas
- TV announcers (CBSSN): Chris Lewis, Doug Pederson & Hailey Sutton
- Box Score

Game information

First quarter

- CONN - O'Connor, Jack 28 yd field goal, 9:21. Huskies 3–0. Drive: 12 plays, 65 yards, TOP 05:39
- JMU - Evans, JC 1 yd run (Run no good), 2:24. Dukes 6–3. Drive: 14 plays, 79 yards, TOP 06:53
- CONN - Wilson, Ky 100 yd kickoff return (O'Connor, Jack kick), 2:09. Huskies 10–6. Drive: 1 plays, 100 yards, TOP 0:00

Second quarter

- JMU - Wisloski, Braeden 16 yd pass from Evans, JC (Suarez, Morgan kick), 2:02. Dukes 13–10. Drive: 8 plays, 78 yards, TOP 04:27
- CONN - Porter, Shamar 67 yd pass from Osborne, Kalieb (Baker, Mike kick), 1:30. Huskies 17–13. Drive: 3 plays, 84 yards, TOP 00:28
- CONN - Baker, Mike 21 yd field goal, 0:00. Huskies 20–13. Drive: 3 plays, 56 yards, TOP 00:32

Third quarter

- CONN - Bowers, Cyncir 9 yd run (run no good), 0:55. Huskies 26–13. Drive: 11 plays, 72 yards, TOP 05:14

Fourth quarter

- JMU - Suarez, Morgan 36 yd field goal, 13:12. Huskies 26–16. Drive: 9 plays, 57 yards, TOP 02:43
- CONN - Willoughby, JD 35 yd pass from Osborne, Kalieb (Baker, Mike kick), 10:42. Huskies 33–16. Drive: 6 plays, 82 yards, TOP 02:24
- CONN - Bowers, Cyncir 2 yd pass from Osborne, Kalieb (kick no good), 5:44. Huskies 39–16. Drive: 6 plays, 59 yards, TOP 03:24
- JMU - Evans, JC 3 yd run (pass no good), 3:53. Huskies 39–22. Drive: 5 plays, 56 yards, TOP 01:45
- CONN - Bowers, Cyncir 17 yd run (Baker, Mike kick), 2:39. Huskies 46–22. Drive: 5 plays, 44 yards, TOP 01:13

Statistics	JMU	CONN
First downs	21	27
Plays–yards	69–331	68–504
Rushes–yards	27–95	48–230
Passing yards	236	274
Passing: comp–att–int	27–42–1	16–20–0
Turnovers	1	0
Time of possession	28:07	31:53

Team	Category	Player	Statistics
James Madison	Passing	JC Evans	27/42, 236 yards, 1 TD
James Madison	Rushing	JC Evans	17 att, 49 yards, 2 TDs
James Madison	Receiving	Braeden Wisloski	7 rec, 75 yards, 1 TD
James Madison	Defense	Seth Gathers	10 tackles
UConn	Passing	Kalieb Osborne	16/20, 274 yards, 3 TDs
UConn	Rushing	Cyncir Bowers	25 att, 123 yards, 2 TDs
UConn	Receiving	Shamar Porter	4 rec, 135 yards, 1 TD
UConn	Defense	Hayden Pegg	11 tackles, 1 sack, 1 INT

=== Old Dominion ===
Old Dominion Monarchs (3–7) at UConn Huskies (5–5) – Game summary

Quarter	1	2	3	4	Total
Monarchs	0	14	0	7	21
Huskies	14	6	6	3	29

at Rentschler Field • East Hartford, Connecticut

- Date: November 21
- Game time: 3:32 p.m.
- Game weather: Sunny • Temperature: 60 °F (16 °C) • Wind: SW at 5 miles per hour (8.0 km/h)
- Game attendance: 27,006
- Referee: Jeremy Parker
- TV announcers ([CBSSN]]): Chris Lewis & Doug Pederson
- Box Score

Game information

First quarter

- CONN - Osborne, Kalieb 13 yd run (Baker, Mike kick), 8:32. Huskies 7–0. Drive: 7 plays, 89 yards, TOP 02:55
- CONN - Bowers, Cyncir 4 yd run (Baker, Mike kick), 3:50. Huskies 14–0. Drive: 9 plays, 72 yards, TOP 03:13

Second quarter

- ODU - Haughton Jr., Leon 17 yd pass from Henicle, Quinn (Nelms, Andrew kick), 14:56. Huskies 14–7. Drive: 8 plays, 81 yards, TOP 03:51
- CONN - Baker, Mike 23 yd field goal, 10:03. Huskies 17–7. Drive: 10 plays, 59 yards, TOP 04:46
- ODU - Roche, Devin 33 yd pass from Henicle, Quinn (Nelms, Andrew kick), 4:46. Huskies 17–14. Drive: 9 plays, 84 yards, TOP 05:14
- CONN - Baker, Mike 36 yd field goal, 1:39. Huskies 20–14. Drive: 9 plays, 50 yards, TOP 02:59

Third quarter

- CONN - Treadway, Ryder 4 yd pass from Osborne, Kalieb (pass no good), 4:17. Huskies 26–14. Drive: 11 plays, 54 yards, TOP 04:47

Fourth quarter

- CONN - Baker, Mike 34 yd field goal, 2:24. Huskies 29–14. Drive: 10 plays, 64 yards, TOP 05:09
- ODU - Haughton Jr., Leon 6 yd pass from Potter, Jaxon (Nelms, Andrew kick), 0:01. Huskies 29–21. Drive: 8 plays, 75 yards, TOP 02:23

Statistics	ODU	CONN
First downs	21	24
Plays–yards	67–392	70–485
Rushes–yards	22–53	48–246
Passing yards	339	239
Passing: comp–att–int	32–45–0	12–22–1
Turnovers	0	1
Time of possession	28:51	31:09

Team	Category	Player	Statistics
Old Dominion	Passing	Jaxon Potter	23/29, 240 yards, 1 TD
Old Dominion	Rushing	Devin Roche	7 att, 40 yards
Old Dominion	Receiving	Devin Roche	7 rec, 83 yards, 1 TD
Old Dominion	Defense	Daevon Iles	8 tackles
UConn	Passing	Kalieb Osborne	12/22, 239 yards, 1 TD
UConn	Rushing	Cyncir Bowers	18 att, 105 yards, 1 TD
UConn	Receiving	Ryder Treadway	3 rec, 66 yards, 1 TD
UConn	Defense	K'von Sherman	7 tackles

=== at Wyoming ===
UConn Huskies (0–0) at Wyoming Cowboys (0–0) – Game summary

Quarter	1	2	3	4	Total
Huskies	0	0	0	0	0
Cowboys	0	0	0	0	0

at War Memorial Stadium • Laramie, Wyoming

- Date: November 28

Game information

First quarter
Second quarter
Third quarter
Fourth quarter

Statistics	CONN	WYO
First downs		
Plays–yards		
Rushes–yards		
Passing yards		
Passing: comp–att–int		
Turnovers		
Time of possession		

Team	Category	Player	Statistics
UConn	Passing		
UConn	Rushing		
UConn	Receiving		
Wyoming	Passing		
Wyoming	Rushing		
Wyoming	Receiving		

== Personnel ==
=== Roster ===
2026 UConn Huskies football team roster
Players
Coaches
Offense

Pos.	#	Name	Class
WR	0	Ky "Flash" Wilson	Jr
WR	2	Jediyah Willoughby	So
RB	3	Kenji Christian	Jr
QB	4	Jake Merklinger	Fr
WR	5	Shamar Porter	Jr
RB	6	Trey Cornist	So
QB	7	Kalieb Osborne	Fr
WR	8	Zy'marion Lang	So
WR	9	Julian Allen	So
WR	11	Ryder Treadway	Fr
QB	12	Tucker McDonald	Jr
QB	13	Bo Polston	Fr
WR	14	Emanuel Ross	Fr
WR	15	Cam Abshire	Jr
WR	16	Kamren Flowers	Fr
WR	17	Teddy Williams	Jr
QB	18	Tyler Smith	Fr
WR	19	Javon Brown	Fr
RB	20	Shawn Simeon	Fr
RB	22	Jaden Hart	So
RB	23	Cyncir Bowers	So
RB	24	Dashun Reeder	Fr
WR	25	Daniel Rose	So
RB	26	Soren Rief	So
TE	42	Mike Burton	Sr
OL	51	Joe McGann	So
OL	52	Deron McLaughlin	So
OL	53	Christos Zigoumis	So
OL	55	Fred Johnson	So
OL	56	Tamarus Walker	Jr
OL	58	Terrence Moore	Sr
OL	59	Finn Wilkins	So
OL	62	Ben Mulholland	Fr
OL	67	Hannes Hammer	Fr
OL	69	Ty Chan	Sr
OL	73	Raphael Greene-Nyarko	Fr
OL	74	Nathan Pahanich	Fr
OL	75	Hill Greenlee	Fr
OL	76	Dominic Rivera	So
OL	78	Isiah Switzer	Fr
OL	79	Christian Richter	Jr
TE	80	Alex Godavitarne	Jr
WR	81	Logan Barnes	Fr
TE	83	Xavier Watson	So
WR	85	Drew Kron	Sr
TE	86	Matt Ragan	Jr
TE	87	Clemens Richter	So

Defense

Pos.	#	Name	Class
LB	0	K'Von Sherman	Jr
DL	2	Tahjae Mullix	Sr
DT	3	Esean Carter	Sr
DB	4	Braedyn Moore	So
LB	5	Rickey Williams	Fr
DB	6	Renick Dorilas	Fr
DB	7	Tyler McKinstry	So
DB	8	CJ Bell Jr.	Fr
LB	9	Zakaih Saez	So
DB	10	Jayden Davis	Jr
DL	11	Avery Dunn	Jr
DB	12	Saxton Suchanic	Fr
DB	13	Jayden Price	Fr
DT	14	Desmond Aladuge	So
DL	15	Anas Luqman	Jr
EDGE	17	Shamar Riser-Pressley	Fr
DB	18	Kylish Hicks	Sr
LB	19	Ethan Hogg	So
LB	20	Luke Murphy	Sr
DB	21	Tracy Revels	So
DB	22	Axavier Bridges-Brooks	So
DB	23	Steve Miller	Fr
DB	24	Zion Paret	Fr
DE	25	Odera Orizu	So
DB	26	Shmar Akande	Fr
LB	27	Terris Dudley	Fr
DB	28	Elijah Whitaker	Fr
LB	29	Lewenski Ydore	So
LB	30	Charles Johnson	Fr
DB	33	Carter Boskovich	Jr
DB	36	Tyler Marescot	Fr
LB	37	Hayden Pegg	So
LB	39	Charlie O'Connor	So
LB	44	John Lista	Sr
LB	47	Jayden Jones	Fr
DE	52	Joshua Mickens	Jr
DL	55	Andrew Laurich	So
DL	84	Eddie Dresch	So
EDGE	91	Mateo Kipke	Fr
DL	94	Matt Hoffman	Sr
DL	95	Melvin Hills III	Fr
EDGE	96	Makijah Latiker	Fr
DE	97	Chamberlain Campbell	So

Special teams

Pos.	#	Name	Class
LS	24	Tashi Crofut	Fr
P	35	Spencer Sullins	Fr
LS	47	Zach Christinat	Jr
P	49	Tommy Warner	Fr
LS	59	David LaGanga	Jr
K	89	Mike Baker	Fr

Head coach

- Jason Candle

Coordinators/assistant coaches

- Nunzio Campanile
  Offensive coordinator
- Ryan Manalac
  Defensive coordinator
- Pat Cashmore
  Special teams coordinator
- Max Wray
  Tight Ends
- Kerry Dixon
  Wide Receivers
- Nate Cole
  Running Backs
- John Morookian
  Offensive Line
- Marquel Blackwell
  Co-Offensive coordinator / Quarterbacks
- Rod Chance
  Passing Game Coordinator / Cornerbacks
- Robert Weiner
  Associate head coach / Quarterbacks
- Mickey Jacobs
  Linebackers
- Jay Anderson
  Safeties
- Brooks Jenkins
  Defensive tackles
- Joe Schaefer
  Defensive line
- Junior Collins
  Assistant wide receivers
- Daryl Ely
  Assistant defensive backs
- Bo Buttermore
  Assistant linebackers
- Nik Kessel
  Assistant special teams
- Phill Guard
  Assistant offensive line
- Brock Hillyer
  Offensive analyst
- Jake DelCampo
  Defensive analyst
- Nate Atkins
  Defensive analyst
- Brady Lichtenberg
  Offensive analyst
- Brad Bichey
  Director of Football Strength and Conditioning

Legend

- (C) Team captain
- (S) Suspended
- (I) Ineligible
- Injured
- Redshirt

Roster
Last update: June 4, 2026

=== Coaching staff additions ===
Name	Previous Position	New Position
Jason Candle	Toledo - Head Coach	UConn - Head Coach
Nunzio Campanile	Syracuse - Quarterbacks	UConn - Offensive coordinator
Rod Chance	Oregon State - co-defensive coordinator	UConn - pass game coordinator and corners
Ryan Manalac	Pittsburgh - Linebackers	UConn - Defensive coordinator
John Morookian	Michigan - Offensive Line	UConn - Offensive Line
Pat Cashmore	Washington State -Special teams coordinator	UConn - Special teams coordinator
Nate Cole	Toledo - running backs	UConn - running backs
Marquel Blackwell	South Carolina - Running backs	UConn - Co-offensive coordinator/Quarterbacks
Kerry Dixon II	Kent State - Wide Receivers	UConn - Wide Receivers
Max Wray	Toledo - assistant offensive line coach	UConn - tight ends
Robert Weiner	Toledo - co-offensive/quarterbacks	UConn- associate head coach
Junior Collins	Mount Union - offensive coordinator	Uconn - Wide receivers
Mickey Jacobs	Duquesne - Defensive Coordinator	Uconn - Linebackers
Bo Buttermore	Tennessee - graduate assistant	Uconn - Assistant Linebackers

=== Coaching staff departures ===
Name	Previous Position	New Position
Jim L. Mora	UConn - Head Coach	Colorado State - Head Coach
Gordon Sammis	UConn - Offensive coordinator	TCU - Offensive coordinator
Matt Brock	UConn - Defensive coordinator	Mississippi State - Defensive coordinator/Linebackers
Doug Shearer	UConn - Special teams coordinator	Virginia Tech - Special teams coordinator
Pryce Tracy	UConn - Quarterbacks/pass game coordinator	Colorado State - Offensive coordinator
Kashif Moore	UConn - Wide receivers	Colorado State - Pass Game Specialist/Wide receivers
Kenny McClendon	UConn - Assistant Head Coach / Defensive Line	Colorado State - Assistant Head Coach / Co-Defensive Coordinator / Defensive Line
Christian Pace	UConn - Offensive Line	Colorado State - Associate Head Coach / Run Game Coordinator / Offensive Line

=== Transfers out ===
Name	Pos.	Height	Weight	Year	Hometown	New school
Cooper Ackerman	DL	6'4	245	Redshirt Freshman	Shrewsbury, MA	Holy Cross
Kobi Albert	DB	5'11	180	Redshirt Sophomore	Fairfield, AL	Southern Miss
Bryce Anderson	TE	6'5	230	Redshirt Freshman	Killingworth, CT	Marist
Jayden Bass	OT	6'6	315	Redshirt Sophomore	Springfield, MA	Rhode Island
Trace Bratten	WR	6'2	185	Freshman	Littleton, CO	
Delano Brown	DL	6'3	288	Freshman	Olney, MD	Southeast Missouri State
Mel Brown	RB	5'8	176	Graduate Student	Stone Mountain, GA	Colorado State
Nykobi Brown	EDGE	6'3	250	Freshman	Valdosta, GA	Colorado State
Drew Buckley	DB	5'9	190	Redshirt Sophomore	Fairfield, CT	
Vincent Carroll-Jackson	DL	6'5	290	Redshirt Sophomore	Harrisburg, PA	Georgia Tech
Carsten Casady	OL	6'7	300	Redshirt Sophomore	Rolesville, NC	West Virginia
Cam Chadwick	DB	6'1	185	Redshirt Sophomore	Plainfield, NJ	Virginia Tech
Thai Chiaokhiao-Bowman	WR	6'0	205	Junior	Minneapolis, MN	Colorado State
Nader Chirchi	TE	6'7	265	Redshirt Sophomore	Alexandria, VA	Colorado State
Cleto Chol	DL	6'6	270	Redshirt Sophomore	Salem, MA	Colorado State
Kervins Choute	DL	6'4	295	Senior	Coconut Creek, FL	Virginia
Oumar Diomande	LB	6'1	230	Redshirt Sophomore	Bronx, NY	Colorado State
Cam Edwards	RB	5'11	181	Redshirt Senior	Norwalk, CT	Michigan State
Nick Evers	QB	6’3	195	Redshirt Junior	Flower Mound, TX	Missouri
Ksaan Farrar	QB	6'3	215	Sophomore	Virginia Beach, VA	Colorado State
MJ Flowers	RB	6'1	220	Redshirt Junior	Cincinnati, OH	Tennessee Tech
Brady Fodor	DL	6'3	270	Redshirt Sophomore	Newtown, CT	Holy Cross
Chase Fountain	DB	5'10	180	Redshirt Sophomore	West Hartford, CT	Holy Cross
Osiris Gilbert	CB	5'9	175	Freshman	Duluth, GA	UCLA
Malichi Greaves	RB	5'9	190	Freshman	Queens, NY	Colorado State
Jackson Harper	WR	6'2	200	Redshirt Sophomore	Simsbury, CT	Colorado State
Caden Hillier	RB	6'2	200	Freshman	Guilford, CT	
Alex Honig	TE	6'7	270	Redshirt Senior	Bavaria, Germany	Northwestern
Chris Hudson	CB	5'10	175	Junior	Windsor, CT	New Haven
Makih Johnson	WR	6'2	185	Freshman	Tarpon Springs, FL	Colorado State
Toriyan Johnson	OT	6'8	330	Redshirt Sophomore	Boston, MA	Colorado State
Brandon Kelley	EDGE	6'6	235	Redshirt Sophomore	Pottstown, PA	Colorado State
Charlie Leahy	DL	6'5	255	Freshman	Westport, CT	
Oliver Lundberg Coleman	RB	5'10	200	Redshirt Freshman	Gothenburg, Sweden	Colorado State
Aubrey Melvin	DL	6'3	300	Freshman	Brandywine, MD	UMass
Tyrece Mills	S	6'1	210	Redshirt Senior	Philadelphia, PA	
Lee Molette III	DB	6'1	190	Redshirt Senior	Brentwood, TN	Arizona
Jon Morris	LB	6'2	200	Redshirt Freshman	Fairfield, CT	Duke
Ben Murawski	OL	6'7	335	Redshirt Junior	Harleysville, PA	Michigan State
Reymello Murphy	WR	6'0	185	Redshirt Senior	Fremont, CA	
John Neider	WR	6'2	205	Redshirt Sophomore	Milford, CT	West Virginia
Kolubah Pewee Jr.	DB	5'11	170	Senior	Staten Island, NY	
Shamar Porter	WR	6'2	205	Redshirt Sophomore	Nashville, TN	
Leo Ricci	K	6'1	180	Freshman	Quakertown, PA	Albany
Michael Robinson III	CB	6'0	190	Junior	Columbus, OH	Southern Miss
Diego Rodriguez	OT	6'5	290	Redshirt Freshman	Hillside, NJ	Colorado State
Victor Rosa	RB	5'8	210	Redshirt Junior	Bristol, CT	Ohio
Terrence Smith Jr.	WR	5'11	170	Redshirt Freshman	Aiken, SC	Colorado State
Dominic Toy	TE	6'6	225	Sophomore	Chester, PA	Colorado State
Toluwanimi Tunde	OT	6'6	290	Redshirt Sophomore	Kwara State, Nigeria	Robert Morris
Javonte Vereen	TE	6'4	214	Redshirt Sophomore	Havelock, NC	Colorado State
Brady Wayburn	OL	6'5	300	Redshirt Sophomore	Gastonia, NC	UCF
Stephon Wright	DL	6'5	285	Graduate Student	Los Angeles, CA	Colorado State

=== Transfers in ===
Name	Pos.	Height	Weight	Year	Hometown	Old school
Cam Abshire	WR	6'4	185	Redshirt Junior	Roanoke, VA	Oklahoma State
Desmond Aladuge	DT	6'4	280	Redshirt Sophomore	Milford, DE	Duke
Julian Allen	WR	6'1	188	Redshirt Sophomore	St. Petersburg, FL	Toledo
Mike Baker	K	5'9	175	Redshirt Freshman	Wilmette, IL	Ole Miss
CJ Bell Jr.	CB	6'1	186	Freshman	Mansfield, MA	Iowa
Cyncir Bowers	RB	5'10	191	Sophomore	Harrisburg, PA	West Virginia
Javon Brown	WR	6'4	198	Redshirt Freshman	Williston, FL	Toledo
Chamberlain Campbell	EDGE	6'7	215	Redshirt Sophomore	Saint Petersburg, FL	Toledo
Esean Carter	DT	6'2	285	Senior	Detroit, MI	Toledo
Kenji Christian	RB	6'2	207	Senior	Birmingham, AL	Toledo
Trey Cornist	RB	6'0	215	Redshirt Sophomore	Cincinnati, OH	Central Michigan
Jayden Davis	S	6'1	192	Junior	Fresno, CA	Fresno State
Renick Dorilas	CB	5'11	168	Freshman	Newark, NJ	Rutgers
Terris Dudley	LB	6'3	200	Freshman	Hilliard, OH	NC State
Avery Dunn	EDGE	6'4	216	Redshirt Senior	Cleveland, OH	Toledo
Kamren Flowers	WR	6'0	170	Freshman	Detroit, MI	Toledo
Alex Godavitarne	TE	6'4	235	Redshirt Junior	Washington, D.C.	Wheeling (DII)
Raphael Greene-Nyarko	OT	6'5	360	Freshman	Cincinnati, OH	Toledo
Hannes Hammer	OT	6'7	313	Redshirt Freshman	Cologne, Germany	Virginia Tech
Jaden Hart	RB	5'11	210	Sophomore	Michigan City, IN	Syracuse
Melvin Hills III	DL	6'3	302	Redshirt Freshman	New Iberia, LA	Texas
Fred Johnson	OL	6'5	290	Redshirt Sophomore	Cleveland, OH	Louisville
Moussa Kane	CB	-	-	-	-	Duke
David LaGanga	LS	6'0	212	Junior	Staten Island, NY	Kentucky
Zy'marion Lang	WR	6'3	180	Junior	Sarasota, FL	Toledo
Andrew Laurich	DL	6'3	295	Redshirt Sophomore	Yorkville, IL	Colorado State
John Lista	LB	6'2	220	Senior	Fair Haven, NJ	Penn
Anas Luqman	EDGE	6'4	260	Redshirt Junior	Cincinnati, OH	Ohio
Tyler McKinstry	CB	5'9	182	Sophomore	Atlanta, GA	Toledo
Jake Merklinger	QB	6'3	215	Redshirt Freshman	Savannah, GA	Tennessee
Joshua Mickens	EDGE	6'3	220	Junior	Indianapolis, IN	Ohio State
Steve Miller	S	6'1	185	Freshman	Greensboro, GA	USC
Braedyn Moore	DB	6'2	204	Sophomore	Hamilton, OH	Toledo
Terrence Moore	IOL	6'6	280	Redshirt Senior	Massillon, OH	Toledo
Ben Mulholland	IOL	6'4	315	Redshirt Freshman	Cypress, TX	Houston Christian
Tahjae Mullix	DL	6'0	282	Senior	Covington, GA	Oregon State
Luke Murphy	LB	6'3	235	Redshirt Senior	Massilon, OH	Coastal Carolina
Odera Orizu	EDGE	6'4	256	Redshirt Sophomore	Charlotte, NC	NC State
Kalieb Osborne	QB	6'3	204	Redshirt Sophomore	Pontiac, MI	Toledo
Zion Paret	CB	5'9	165	Freshman	Miami, FL	Florida Atlantic
Nathan Pahanich	OT	6'4	291	Freshman	Princeton, NJ	Wake Forest
Jayden Price	S	6'3	180	Redshirt Freshman	Cranberry, PA	Toledo
Matt Ragan	TE	6'5	-	Redshirt Junior	Westboro, MA	Boston College
Dashun Reeder	RB	6'0	190	Redshirt Freshman	Greenville, SC	Northwestern
Tracy Revels	S	6'1	184	Redshirt Sophomore	Texarkana, TX	Michigan State
Christian Richter	OT	6'6	300	Redshirt Junior	Baltimore, MD	Marshall
Shamar Riser-Pressley	EDGE	6'6	271	Redshirt Freshman	Detroit, MI	Buffalo
Dominic Rivera	OT	6'8	325	Redshirt Sophomore	Olmstead Falls, OH	Toledo
Emanuel Ross	WR	6'2	202	Redshirt Freshman	Jackson, NJ	Syracuse
Zakaih Saez	EDGE	6'4	230	Redshirt Sophomore	Lake Worth, FL	Oregon State
Kvon Sherman	LB	6'2	236	Senior	Pearland, TX	Toledo
Shawn Simeon	RB	5'10	180	Freshman	Naples, FL	Toledo
Isiah Switzer	OT	6'6	295	Redshirt Freshman	Cleveland, OH	Toledo
Ryder Treadway	WR	6'3	193	Freshman	Frisco, TX	Toledo
Tommy Warner	P	6'3	199	Freshman	Melbourne, VIC	Northwest Missouri State (DII)
Rickey Williams	LB	6'2	230	Redshirt Freshman	Akron, OH	Toledo
Jediyah Willoughby	WR	6'2	190	Redshirt Sophomore	East Point, GA	Toledo
Ky "Flash" Wilson	WR	5'9	180	Junior	Farrell, PA	Youngstown State

=== NFL draft ===
==== Entered NFL draft ====
Player	Position	Round	Pick	Drafted by
Skyler Bell	WR	4	125	Buffalo Bills
Joe Fagnano	QB	UDFA		Baltimore Ravens
