= 2026 Lafayette Leopards football team =

American college football season

2026 Lafayette Leopards football
- Conference: Patriot League
- Record: 4–7 (3–5 Patriot)
- Head coach: John Troxell (5th season)
- Offensive coordinator: T. J. Dimuzio (5th season)
- Defensive coordinator: Mike Saint Germain (5th season)
- Home stadium: Fisher Stadium

2026 Patriot League football standings
	Conf.			Overall
Team	W		L	W		L
No. 16 Lehigh +^	7	–	1	9	–	2
Holy Cross	6	–	2	6	–	5
Colgate	5	–	3	6	–	5
Villanova	5	–	3	6	–	5
Richmond	4	–	4	6	–	5
Fordham	4	–	4	4	–	7
Lafayette	3	–	4	4	–	6
Georgetown	3	–	4	3	–	6
William & Mary	2	–	6	4	–	7
Bucknell	0	–	8	1	–	10
+ – Conference co-champions; ^ – FCS playoff participant; As of November 21, 2026; Rankings from STATS Poll

The 2026 Lafayette Leopards football team represent Lafayette College as a member of the Patriot League during the 2026 NCAA Division I FCS football season. The Leopards are coached by fifth-year head coach John Troxell and play at the Fisher Stadium in Easton, Pennsylvania.

== Schedule ==
Date	Time	Opponent	Site	TV	Result	Attendance
August 27	7:00 p.m.	at Georgetown	Cooper Field; Washington, DC	ESPN+	No contest (Note: The game was ruled a no contest after prolonged lightning strikes in the Washington, D.C. area. After approximately a two-hour delay, the game was called after halftime with Lafayette trailing 13–7 and slated to receive the second-half kickoff. The game will not be rescheduled.)	—
September 5	12:00 p.m.	at UConn*	Rentschler Field; East Hartford, CT	WFSB/WWAX	L 7–56	31,831
September 12	12:30 p.m.	Marist*	Fisher Stadium; Easton, PA	ESPN+	W 13–9	
September 19	12:00 p.m.	at Columbia*	Wien Stadium; New York, NY	ESPN+	L 34–40 ^{OT}	3,728
September 26	12:30 p.m.	Holy Cross	Fisher Stadium; Easton, PA	ESPN+	L 30–38	3,394
October 3	12:30 p.m.	No. 24 Richmond	Fisher Stadium; Easton, PA	ESPN+	L 31–40	4,123
October 17	3:00 p.m.	at Bucknell	Christy Mathewson-Memorial Stadium; Lewisburg, PA	ESPN+	W 20–7	1,580
October 24	1:00 p.m.	at Fordham	Coffey Field; The Bronx, NY	ESPN+	W 31–17	4,107
October 31	12:30 p.m.	Villanova	Fisher Stadium; Easton, PA	ESPN+	L 21–44	4,293
November 7	1:00 p.m.	at William & Mary	Zable Stadium; Williamsburg, VA	ESPN+	W 19–14	10,006
November 14	1:00 p.m.	at Colgate	Andy Kerr Stadium; Hamilton, NY	ESPN+	L 7–19	1,188
November 21	12:30 p.m.	No. 16 Lehigh^{†}	Fisher Stadium; Easton, PA (The Rivalry)	ESPN+, SEN	L 48–51 ^{OT}	13,132
*Non-conference game; ^{†}Homecoming; Rankings from STATS Poll released prior to the game; All times are in Eastern time

== Game summaries ==
=== at Georgetown ===
Lafayette Leopards (0–0) at Georgetown Hoyas (0–0) – Game summary – NO CONTEST

Quarter	1	2	3	4	Total
Leopards	-	-	-	-	0
Hoyas	-	-	-	-	0

at Cooper Field • Washington, DC

- Date: August 27
- Game time: 7:00 p.m.
- TV: ESPN+

Statistics	LAF	GTWN
First downs	–	–
Plays–yards	–	–
Rushes–yards	–	–
Passing yards	–	–
Passing: comp–att–int	–	–
Turnovers	–	–
Time of possession	–	–

Team	Category	Player	Statistics
Lafayette	Passing	–	–
Lafayette	Rushing	–	–
Lafayette	Receiving		
Georgetown	Passing	–	–
Georgetown	Rushing	–	–
Georgetown	Receiving	–	–

=== at UConn (FBS) ===
Lafayette Leopards (0–0) at UConn Huskies (FBS) (0–0) – Game summary

Quarter	1	2	3	4	Total
Leopards	0	0	0	7	7
Huskies (FBS)	21	14	14	7	56

at Rentschler Field • East Hartford, Connecticut

- Date: September 5
- Game time: 12:00 p.m.
- Game weather: Sunny • Temperature: 75 °F (24 °C) • Wind: N at 8 miles per hour (13 km/h)
- Game attendance: 31,831
- Referee: Garrett Dickerson
- TV announcers (UConn+): Randy Brochu, Marc Robbins and Dan Booth

Game information

First quarter

- CONN - Javon Brown 24-yard pass from Kalieb Osborne (Jack O'Connor kick), 12:50. Huskies 7–0. Drive: 6 plays, 75 yards, 02:10.
- CONN - Kenji Christian 18-yard pass from Kalieb Osborne (Jack O'Connor kick), 7:15. Huskies 14–0. Drive: 9 plays, 71 yards, 03:41.
- CONN - Kalieb Osborne 9-yard run (Jack O'Connor kick), 1:43. Huskies 21–0. Drive: 8 plays, 45 yards, 04:15.

Second quarter

- CONN - Cyncir Bowers 16-yard run (Jack O'Connor kick), 9:14. Huskies 28–0. Drive: 7 plays, 52 yards, 02:42.
- CONN - Kenji Christian 25-yard run (Jack O'Connor kick), 2:36. Huskies 35–0. Drive: 2 plays, 16 yards, 00:30.

Third quarter

- CONN - Kalieb Osborne 11-yard run (Jack O'Connor kick), 10:37. Huskies 42–0. Drive: 7 plays, 80 yards, 03:17.
- CONN - Trey Cornist 55-yard run (Jack O'Connor kick), 2:36. Huskies 49–0. Drive: 5 plays, 85 yards, 02:03.

Fourth quarter

- CONN - Raymond Liggins III 60-yard pass from Tucker McDonald (Jack O'Connor kick), 3:07. Huskies 56–0. Drive: 4 plays, 80 yards, 02:07.
- LAF - Payton Greer 2-yard run (Jack Simonetta kick), 0:44. Huskies 56–7. Drive: 8 plays, 75 yards, 02:23.

Statistics	LAF	CONN
First downs	19	29
Plays–yards	72–209	73–671
Rushes–yards	30–64	40–301
Passing yards	145	370
Passing: comp–att–int	21–42–0	25–33–2
Turnovers	0	2
Time of possession	28:18	31:42

Team	Category	Player	Statistics
Lafayette	Passing	Daniel Lipovski	16/33, 102 yards
Lafayette	Rushing	Malachi Gamble	6 carries, 28 yards
Lafayette	Receiving	Nick Bierman	4 receptions, 30 yards
Lafayette	Defense	Dhonte Jackson	8 tackles
UConn	Passing	Kalieb Osborne	19/26, 265 yards, 2 TD, INT
UConn	Rushing	Kalieb Osborne	8 carries, 90 yards, 2 TD
UConn	Receiving	Javon Brown	6 rec, 92 yards, TD
UConn	Defense	K'von Sherman	5 tackles, 1 sack

=== Marist ===
Marist Red Foxes (1–1) at Lafayette Leopards (0–1) – Game summary

Quarter	1	2	3	4	Total
Red Foxes	0	0	0	0	0
Leopards	0	0	0	0	0

at Fisher Stadium • Easton, Pennsylvania

- Date: September 12
- Game time: 12:30 p.m.
- TV: ESPN+

Game information

First quarter
Second quarter
Third quarter
Fourth quarter

Statistics	MRST	LAF
First downs		
Plays–yards		
Rushes–yards		
Passing yards		
Passing: comp–att–int		
Turnovers		
Time of possession		

Team	Category	Player	Statistics
Marist	Passing		
Marist	Rushing		
Marist	Receiving		
Lafayette	Passing		
Lafayette	Rushing		
Lafayette	Receiving		

=== at Columbia ===
Lafayette Leopards (1–1) at Columbia Lions (0–0) – Game summary

Quarter	1	2	3	4	OT	Total
Leopards	3	7	7	17	0	34
Lions	7	10	7	10	6	40

at Wien Stadium • Manhattan, New York

- Date: September 19
- Game time: 12:00 p.m.
- Game weather: Sunny • Temperature: 67 °F (19 °C) • Wind: E at 8 miles per hour (13 km/h)
- Game attendance: 3,728
- Referee: Alexander Randolph
- TV announcers (ESPN+): Lance Meadow (play-by-play) and CJ Brown (analyst)

Game information

First quarter

- COLU – Bryce Coleman 2-yard pass from Xander Menapace (Hugo Merry kick), 11:23. Lions 7–0. Drive: 9 plays, 75 yards, 3:37.
- LAF – Jack Simonetta 40-yard field goal, 8:01. Lions 7–3. Drive: 8 plays, 43 yards, 3:18.

Second quarter

- COLU – Xander Menapace 1-yard run (Hugo Merry kick), 6:45. Lions 14–3. 'Drive: 6 plays, 30 yards, 3:16.
- LAF – Zane Wooldridge 16-yard pass from Daniel Lipovski (Jack Simonetta kick), 3:20. Lions 14–10. Drive: 8 plays, 75 yards, 3:25.
- COLU – Hugo Merry 25-yard field goal, 0:00. Lions 17–10. Drive: 7 plays, 76 yards, 0:49.

Third quarter

- LAF – Jakyre Henley 24-yard run (Jack Simonetta kick), 11:20. Tied 17–17. Drive: 9 plays, 70 yards, 3:34.
- COLU – Griffin Johnson 1-yard run (Hugo Merry kick), 2:45. Lions 24–17. Drive: 8 plays, 89 yards, 4:28.

Fourth quarter

- COLU – Bryce Coleman 15-yard pass from Chase Goodwin (Hugo Merry kick), 14:05. Lions 31–17. Drive: 7 plays, 52 yards, 2:02.
- LAF – Carson Persing 14-yard pass from Daniel Lipovski (Jack Simonetta kick), 9:27. Lions 31–24. Drive: 10 plays, 66 yards, 4:33.
- LAF – Sean Curtis 23-yard fumble recovery (Jack Simonetta kick), 8:12. Tied 31–31.
- COLU – Hugo Merry 21-yard field goal, 4:20. Lions 34–31. Drive: 8 plays, 72 yards, 3:49.
- LAF – Jack Simonetta 31-yard field goal, 1:03. Tied 34–34. Drive: 11 plays, 61 yards, 3:17.

Overtime

- COLU – Beckett Robinson 25-yard pass from Chase Goodwin. Lions 40–34. Drive: 1 play, 25 yards.

Statistics	LAF	COLU
First downs	20	28
Plays–yards	68–338	76–524
Rushes–yards	39–211	36–155
Passing yards	127	369
Passing: comp–att–int	14–29–2	26–40–0
Turnovers	2	1
Time of possession	27:50	32:10

Team	Category	Player	Statistics
Lafayette	Passing	Daniel Lipovski	13/28, 127 yards, 2 TD, 2 INT
Lafayette	Rushing	Jakyre Henley	17 carries, 125 yards, TD
Lafayette	Receiving	Mason Kuehner	6 receptions, 58 yards
Columbia	Passing	Chase Goodwin	25/39, 367 yards, 2 TD
Columbia	Rushing	Griffin Johnson	19 carries, 124 yards, TD
Columbia	Receiving	Bryce Coleman	7 receptions, 127 yards, 2 TD

=== Holy Cross ===
Holy Cross Crusaders (0–4) at Lafayette Leopards (1–2) – Game summary

Quarter	1	2	3	4	Total
Crusaders	0	0	0	0	0
Leopards	0	0	0	0	0

at Fisher Stadium • Easton, Pennsylvania

- Date: September 26
- Game time: 12:30 p.m.
- TV announcers (ESPN+): Gary Laubach (play-by-play), Mike Joseph (analyst) and Luke Meli (sideline)

Game information

First quarter
Second quarter
Third quarter
Fourth quarter

Statistics	HC	LAF
First downs		
Plays–yards		
Rushes–yards		
Passing yards		
Passing: comp–att–int		
Turnovers		
Time of possession		

Team	Category	Player	Statistics
Holy Cross	Passing		
Holy Cross	Rushing		
Holy Cross	Receiving		
Lafayette	Passing		
Lafayette	Rushing		
Lafayette	Receiving		

=== No. 24 Richmond ===
No. 24 Richmond Spiders (4–1) at Lafayette Leopards (1–3) – Game summary

Quarter	1	2	3	4	Total
No. 24 Spiders	7	10	14	9	40
Leopards	14	10	0	7	31

at Fisher Stadium • Easton, Pennsylvania

- Date: October 3
- Game time: 12:30 p.m.
- Game weather: Sunny • Temperature: 71 °F (22 °C) • Wind: E at 8 miles per hour (13 km/h)
- Game attendance: 4,123
- Referee: Alex Parrella
- TV announcers (ESPN+): Gary Laubach (play-by-play), Mike Joseph (analyst) and Michael Marcantonini (sideline)

Game information

First quarter

- (8:21) LAF - Daniel Lipovski 4-yard run, Jack Simonetta kick (Drive: 6 Plays, 75 yards, 1:53; LAF 7–0)
- (1:05) RICH - Ashten Snelsire 24-yard pass to Carson Derey, Kyle Bitsko kick (Drive: 12 Plays, 75 yards, 7:16; TIED 7–7)
- (0:20) LAF - Jakyre Henley 72-yard run, Jack Simonetta kick (Drive: 2 Plays, 75 yards, 0:45; LAF 14–7)

Second quarter

- (6:08) LAF - Jack Simonetta 21-yard field goal (Drive: 5 Plays, 31 yards, 1:59; LAF 17–7)
- (1:45) LAF - Jakyre Henley 74-yard run, Jack Simonetta kick (Drive: 2 Plays, 91 yards, 0:43; LAF 24–7)
- (0:33) RICH - Kyle Bitsko 25-yard field goal (Drive: 9 Plays, 67 yards, 1:12; LAF 24–10)
- (0:04) RICH - Ashten Snelsire 3-yard run, Kyle Bitsko kick (Drive: 3 Plays, 16 yards, 0:15; LAF 24–17)

Third quarter

- (11:04) RICH - Aziz Foster-Powell 4-yard run, Kyle Bitsko kick (Drive: 7 Plays, 75 yards, 3:56; TIED 24–24)
- (2:42) RICH - Ashten Snelsire 9-yard pass to Quanye Veney, Kyle Bitsko kick (Drive: 12 Plays, 56 yards, 7:13; RICH 31–24)

Fourth quarter

- (11:23) RICH - Ashten Snelsire 3-yard pass to Sean Clarke, Kyle Bitsko kick (Drive: 8 Plays, 57 yards, 4:46; RICH 38–24)
- (9:35) LAF - Malachi Gamble 10-yard run, Jack Simonetta kick (Drive: 4 Plays, 69 yards, 1:48; RICH 38–31)
- (1:30) RICH - Camden Byrd 0-yard safety (RICH 40–31)

Statistics	RICH	LAF
First downs	30	14
Plays–yards	86–468	47–367
Rushes–yards	48–250	26–191
Passing yards	218	176
Passing: comp–att–int	24–38–2	10–21–1
Turnovers	3	2
Time of possession	41:41	18:19

Team	Category	Player	Statistics
Richmond	Passing	Ashten Snelsire	24/38, 218 yards, 3 TD, 2 INT
Richmond	Rushing	Ashten Snelsire	22 carries, 113 yards, TD
Richmond	Receiving	Carson Derey	5 receptions, 61 yards, TD
Lafayette	Passing	Daniel Lipovski	7/16, 101 yards, INT
Lafayette	Rushing	Jakyre Henley	8 carries, 152 yards, 2 TD
Lafayette	Receiving	Mason Kuehner	5 receptions, 108 yards

=== at Bucknell ===
Lafayette Leopards (1–4) at Bucknell Bison (1–5) – Game summary

Quarter	1	2	3	4	Total
Leopards	0	0	0	0	0
Bison	0	0	0	0	0

at Christy Mathewson–Memorial Stadium • Lewisburg, Pennsylvania

- Date: October 17
- Game time: 3:00 p.m.
- TV: ESPN+

Game information

First quarter
Second quarter
Third quarter
Fourth quarter

Statistics	LAF	BUCK
First downs		
Plays–yards		
Rushes–yards		
Passing yards		
Passing: comp–att–int		
Turnovers		
Time of possession		

Team	Category	Player	Statistics
Lafayette	Passing		
Lafayette	Rushing		
Lafayette	Receiving		
Bucknell	Passing		
Bucknell	Rushing		
Bucknell	Receiving		

=== at Fordham ===
Lafayette Leopards (2–4) at Fordham Rams (2–6) – Game summary

Quarter	1	2	3	4	Total
Leopards	0	0	0	0	0
Rams	0	0	0	0	0

at Coffey Field • The Bronx, New York

- Date: October 24
- Game time: 1:00 p.m.
- TV: ESPN+

Game information

First quarter
Second quarter
Third quarter
Fourth quarter

Statistics	LAF	FOR
First downs		
Plays–yards		
Rushes–yards		
Passing yards		
Passing: comp–att–int		
Turnovers		
Time of possession		

Team	Category	Player	Statistics
Lafayette	Passing		
Lafayette	Rushing		
Lafayette	Receiving		
Fordham	Passing		
Fordham	Rushing		
Fordham	Receiving		

=== Villanova ===
Villanova Wildcats (4–4) at Lafayette Leopards (3–4) – Game summary

Quarter	1	2	3	4	Total
Wildcats	0	0	0	0	0
Leopards	0	0	0	0	0

at Fisher Stadium • Easton, Pennsylvania

- Date: October 31
- Game time: 12:30 p.m.
- TV: ESPN+

Game information

First quarter
Second quarter
Third quarter
Fourth quarter

Statistics	VILL	LAF
First downs		
Plays–yards		
Rushes–yards		
Passing yards		
Passing: comp–att–int		
Turnovers		
Time of possession		

Team	Category	Player	Statistics
Villanova	Passing		
Villanova	Rushing		
Villanova	Receiving		
Lafayette	Passing		
Lafayette	Rushing		
Lafayette	Receiving		

=== at William & Mary ===
Lafayette Leopards (3–5) at William & Mary Tribe (3–6) – Game summary

Quarter	1	2	3	4	Total
Leopards	0	0	0	0	0
Tribe	0	0	0	0	0

at Zable Stadium • Williamsburg, Virginia

- Date: November 7
- Game time: 1:00 p.m.
- TV: ESPN+

Game information

First quarter
Second quarter
Third quarter
Fourth quarter

Statistics	LAF	W&M
First downs		
Plays–yards		
Rushes–yards		
Passing yards		
Passing: comp–att–int		
Turnovers		
Time of possession		

Team	Category	Player	Statistics
Lafayette	Passing		
Lafayette	Rushing		
Lafayette	Receiving		
William & Mary	Passing		
William & Mary	Rushing		
William & Mary	Receiving		

=== at Colgate ===
Lafayette Leopards (4–5) at Colgate Raiders (5–5) – Game summary

Quarter	1	2	3	4	Total
Leopards	0	0	0	0	0
Raiders	0	0	0	0	0

at Andy Kerr Stadium • Hamilton, New York

- Date: November 14
- Game time: 1:00 p.m.
- TV: ESPN+

Game information

First quarter
Second quarter
Third quarter
Fourth quarter

Statistics	LAF	COLG
First downs		
Plays–yards		
Rushes–yards		
Passing yards		
Passing: comp–att–int		
Turnovers		
Time of possession		

Team	Category	Player	Statistics
Lafayette	Passing		
Lafayette	Rushing		
Lafayette	Receiving		
Colgate	Passing		
Colgate	Rushing		
Colgate	Receiving		

=== No. 16 Lehigh (The Rivalry) ===
No. 16 Lehigh Mountain Hawks (9–2) at Lafayette Leopards (4–6) – Game summary

Quarter	1	2	3	4	Total
No. 16 Mountain Hawks	0	0	0	0	0
Leopards	0	0	0	0	0

at Fisher Stadium • Easton, Pennsylvania

- Date: November 21
- Game time: 12:30 p.m.
- TV: ESPN+

Game information

First quarter
Second quarter
Third quarter
Fourth quarter

Statistics	LEH	LAF
First downs		
Plays–yards		
Rushes–yards		
Passing yards		
Passing: comp–att–int		
Turnovers		
Time of possession		

Team	Category	Player	Statistics
Lehigh	Passing		
Lehigh	Rushing		
Lehigh	Receiving		
Lafayette	Passing		
Lafayette	Rushing		
Lafayette	Receiving		
