= Rich Nagy =

American football coach (born 1965)

Current position
- Title: Head coach
- Team: Lehigh
- Conference: Patriot League
- Record: 10–2

Biographical details
- Born: June 21, 1965 (age 61); Fairfield, Connecticut, U.S.
- Education: Trinity College (1987)

Playing career
- 1983–1986: Trinity (CT)
- Position: Running back

Coaching career (HC unless noted)
- 1987: Trinity (CT) (DB)
- 1988: Allegheny (GA)
- 1989: Union (NY) (OLB)
- 1990–1991: Maine (OLB)
- 1992–1995: Allegheny (ST/LB)
- 1996: Allegheny (AHC/ST/LB)
- 1997: South Dakota (ST/DB)
- 1998: Fordham (DC/DB)
- 1999–2000: Fordham (DB)
- 2001–2005: Maine (DC/LB/DB)
- 2006–2008: Murray State (DC/LB)
- 2009: Hofstra (DC/LB)
- 2010–2011: Western Michigan (S)
- 2012: Western Michigan (DC/S)
- 2013–2014: Old Dominion (DC/DB)
- 2015–2018: Old Dominion (DC/LB)
- 2019–2022: Allegheny
- 2023–2025: Lehigh (DC/LB)
- 2026–present: Lehigh

Head coaching record
- Overall: 20–22

Accomplishments and honors

Championships
- 1 Patriot (2026)

Richard Nagy (born June 21, 1965) is an American college football coach. He is the head football coach at Lehigh University. He was the head football coach for Allegheny College from 2019 to 2022.

== Early life ==
Richard Nagy was born on June 21, 1965 in Fairfield, Connecticut. Nagy played as a runningback at Trinity College in Hartford, Connecticut and was their most valuable player in 1986. Nagy graduated from Trinity in 1987 with a degree in political science.

== Coaching career ==
Nagy started his coaching career in 1987 working as a part time defensive secondary coach for his alma mater during his senior year, before working as a graduate assistant at Allegheny College coaching their inside linebackers. Afterwards he coached at Union College in 1989 and Maine before returning to Allegheny as a full time positional coach in 1992. He would go on to work as a positional coach at South Dakota from 1997 to 1998, Fordham from 1998 to 2001, another stint at Maine from 2001 to 2005, Murray State from 2005 to 2008, and Hofstra from 2009 to 2010.

Nagy's first experience coaching at an FBS level started in 2012 when he coached the safeties and was defensive coordinator for the Western Michigan Broncos. Next season in 2013 he was named the defensive coordinator and linebackers coach at Old Dominion, a position he would hold for six years. In 2019 he was named the head coach at Allegheny leading the Gators for three seasons. (Note: Nagy was head coach for four years, however, the 2020 season would be cancelled due to the COVID-19 pandemic)

=== Lehigh (2023–present) ===
Going into the 2023 season the Lehigh University Mountain Hawks fired Tom Gilmore, the school's head coach since 2019 who compiled a 9–27 record at Lehigh, alongside his entire coaching staff. Gilmore would be replaced by Kevin Cahill, Yale's offensive coordinator and assistant head coach, who brought Nagy in as Defensive Coordinator/Linebackers coach as the two worked together at Murray State. In 2024 the Mountain Hawks ranked in the top 20 nationally in total defense, pass defense and sacks and allowed a league-low 21.6 points per game. Nagy's defense would improve in his third year as coordinator with Lehigh ranked in the top five nationally in five major defensive categories and lead the FCS in Red Zone defense. In both seasons Lehigh would win the Patriot League title.

Despite a concerted fundraising effort to retain Cahill by increasing his pay, he would return to Yale at the end of the 2025 season leaving a vacancy at head coach. Nagy would be chosen as Cahill's replacement becoming the programs 31st head coach and stated his priorities where to keep the coaching staff together, and to win another Patriot League title.

== Personal life ==
Rich is married to Erika Nagy and is the father of two daughters: Jordan and Erin.

== Head coaching record ==
Year	Team	Overall	Conference	Standing	Bowl/playoffs
Allegheny Gators (North Coast Athletic Conference) (2019–2021)
2019	Allegheny	4–6	4–5	7th	
2021	Allegheny	3–7	2–7	8th	
Allegheny Gators (Presidents' Athletic Conference) (2022)
2022	Allegheny	3–7	2–6	9th	
Allegheny:		10–20	8–18		
Lehigh Mountain Hawks (Patriot League) (2026–present)
2026	Lehigh	10–2	8–1	1st	NCAA Division I
Lehigh:		10–2	8–1		
Total:		20–22			
