= 2026 Lehigh Mountain Hawks football team =

American college football season

2026 Lehigh Mountain Hawks football

Patriot League champion

FCS Playoffs
- Conference: Patriot League

Ranking
- STATS: No. 16
- FCS Coaches: No. 15
- Record: 10–2 (8–1 Patriot)
- Head coach: Rich Nagy (1st season)
- Offensive coordinator: Dan Hunt (4th season)
- Defensive coordinator: Mike Kashurba (1st season)
- Home stadium: Goodman Stadium

Uniform
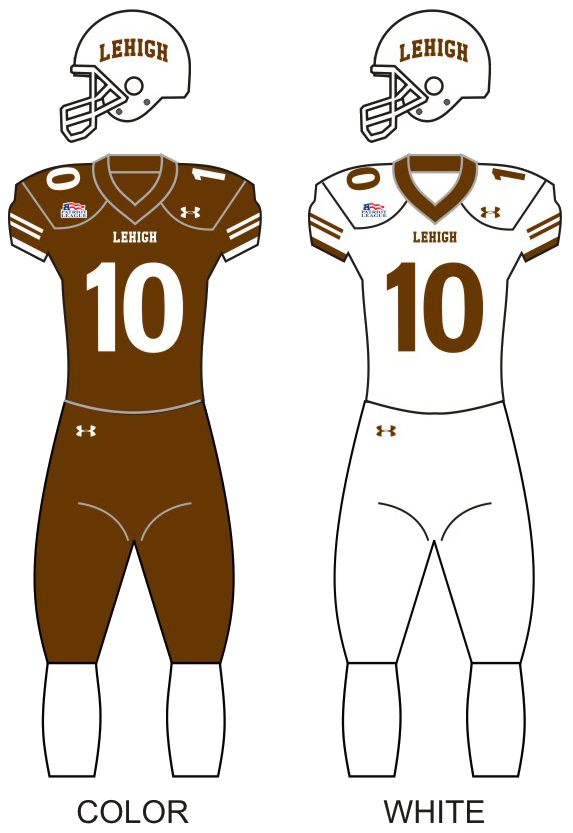

2026 Patriot League football standings
	Conf.			Overall
Team	W		L	W		L
No. 16 Lehigh $^	8	–	1	10	–	2
Holy Cross	7	–	2	7	–	5
Colgate	6	–	3	7	–	5
Villanova	6	–	3	7	–	5
Richmond	5	–	4	7	–	5
Fordham	4	–	5	4	–	8
Lafayette	3	–	5	4	–	7
Georgetown	3	–	5	3	–	7
William & Mary	2	–	7	4	–	8
Bucknell	0	–	9	1	–	11
$ – Conference champion; ^ – FCS playoff participant; As of November 22, 2026; Rankings from STATS Poll

The 2026 Lehigh Mountain Hawks football team will represent Lehigh University as a member of the Patriot League during the 2026 NCAA Division I FCS football season. The Mountain Hawks will be coached by first-year head coach Rich Nagy and play at the Goodman Stadium in Lower Saucon Township, Pennsylvania.

== Schedule ==
Date	Time	Opponent	Rank	Site	TV	Result	Attendance
August 29	3:30 pm	at Holy Cross	No. 11	Fitton Field; Worcester, MA	ESPN+	W 35–10	11,472
September 5	12:30 pm	at Georgetown	No. 10	Cooper Field; Washington D.C.	ESPN+	W 45–14	2,386
September 12	2:00 pm	No. 16 William & Mary	No. 9	Goodman Stadium; Lower Saucon, PA (Note: Lehigh is often associated with the location of its main campus in Bethlehem but its athletic campus is located in neighboring Lower Saucon.)	ESPN+	W 44–20	5,240
September 19	12:00 pm	Dartmouth*^{†}	No. 7	Goodman Stadium; Lower Saucon, PA	ESPN+	W 24–20	8,902
September 26	1:00 pm	at Penn*	No. 6	Franklin Field; Philadelphia, PA	ESPN+	W 20–7	1,839
October 3	12:00 pm	Fordham	No. 6	Goodman Stadium; Lower Saucon, PA	ESPN+	W 34–0	5,033
October 17	2:00 pm	at Cornell*	No. 4	Schoellkopf Field; Ithaca, NY	ESPN+	L 38–48	9,198
October 24	3:30 pm	at Villanova	No. 11	Villanova Stadium; Villanova, PA	ESPN+	L 18–24	5,451
October 31	12:00 pm	Bucknell	No. 19	Goodman Stadium; Lower Saucon, PA	ESPN+	W 31–30	4,313
November 7	12:00 pm	Colgate	No. 17	Goodman Stadium; Lower Saucon, PA	ESPN+	W 33–7	4,881
November 14	2:00 pm	at Richmond	No. 17	Robins Stadium; Richmond, VA	ESPN+	W 21–14	4,845
November 21	11:30 a.m.	at Lafayette	No. 16	Fisher Stadium; Easton, PA (The Rivalry)	ESPN+	W 51–48 ^{OT}	13,132
*Non-conference game; ^{†}Homecoming; Rankings from STATS Poll released prior to the game; All times are in Eastern time

== Preseason ==
In the 2025 season, Lehigh went undefeated in the regular season but suffered a loss in their first playoff game against Villanova after a first-round bye. Following concerns that their then head coach Kevin Cahill would be poached to a bigger school following this success, Lehigh launched a concerted fundraising effort to infuse the football team with $1 million being raised by private donors, and another $2.5 million donated by the Vandergrift family specifically to pay for the head coach, whose title would be renamed to the "Vandergrift Family Head Football Coach."

Despite this, Cahill left Lehigh and took up the head coaching job at Yale on February 23, where he worked on their coaching staff for 10 years prior to his 3-season stint as Lehigh's head coach. Defensive coordinator Rich Nagy, who had joined the team at the same time as Cahill, filled the vacancy and become the program's 31st head coach. Special Team's coordinator Mike Kashurba was promoted to defensive coordinator to fill Nagy's vacancy while offensive coordinator Dan Hunt was also named Associate Head Coach. Other changes to the coaching staff included Offensive Line Coach/Run Game Coordinator Mike Morita being named Assistant Offensive Coordinator while Defensive Line Coach Jeff Comissiong was promoted to Defensive Run Game Coordinator. On April 21, Nagy named Chip Taylor, the head coach at Hamline for the last 10 years, as the special teams coordinator. In his inaugural press conference, Nagy stated his goal for the season was to win another Patriot League title.

Lehigh's training camp closed on April 18. Several of the team's veterans from the prior season, namely wide receiver Geoffrey Jamiel, graduated, while wideout Mason Humphrey, running back Jaden Green and backup quarterback Matt Machalik where lost to the transfer portal.

== Game summaries ==
=== at Holy Cross ===
No. 11 Lehigh Mountain Hawks (0–0) at Holy Cross Crusaders (0–0) – Game summary

Quarter	1	2	3	4	Total
No. 11 Mountain Hawks	21	0	7	7	35
Crusaders	0	3	0	7	10

at Fitton Field • Worcester, Massachusetts

- Date: August 29
- Game time: 3:30 p.m. EDT
- Game weather: Sunny • Temperature: 76 °F (24 °C) • Wind: SE at 7 miles per hour (11 km/h)
- Game attendance: 11,472
- TV announcers (ESPN+): Kevin Gehl, Kevin Shea and Rachel Hopmayer
- Box score, Recap

Game information

First quarter

- LEH – Hayden Johnson 65-yard run (Connor Poole kick), 12:26. Mountain Hawks 7–0. Drive: 4 plays, 79 yards, 2:28.
- LEH – Luke Yoder 4-yard run (Connor Poole kick), 6:10. Mountain Hawks 14–0. Drive: 9 plays, 61 yards, 5:21.
- LEH – Luke Yoder 33-yard run (Connor Poole kick), 2:51. Mountain Hawks 21–0. Drive: 5 plays, 50 yards, 1:52.

Second quarter

- HC – Owen Saraceno 26-yard field goal, 7:05. Mountain Hawks 21–3. Drive: 9 plays, 51 yards, 3:51.

Third quarter

- LEH – Nick Palumbo 14-yard pass from Hayden Johnson (Connor Poole kick), 7:20. Mountain Hawks 28–3. Drive: 9 plays, 77 yards, 4:48.

Fourth quarter

- HC – Drae Tyme 15-yard pass from David Lynch (Owen Saraceno kick), 14:13. Mountain Hawks 28–10. Drive: 13 plays, 82 yards, 4:26.
- LEH – Luke Yoder 6-yard run (Connor Poole kick), 9:59. Mountain Hawks 35–10. Drive: 2 plays, 10 yards, 0:47.

Statistics	LEH	HC
First downs	18	21
Plays–yards	58–398	62–391
Rushes–yards	40–281	22–78
Passing yards	117	313
Passing: comp–att–int	9–18–0	25–40–2
Turnovers	0	3
Time of possession	31:32	28:28

Team	Category	Player	Statistics
Lehigh	Passing	Hayden Johnson	9/18, 117 yards, TD
Lehigh	Rushing	Luke Yoder	21 carries, 130 yards, 3 TD
Lehigh	Receiving	Anthony Feaster	1 reception, 32 yards
Holy Cross	Passing	David Lynch	25/40, 313 yards, TD, 2 INT
Holy Cross	Rushing	Joseph Williams	10 carries, 36 yards
Holy Cross	Receiving	Myles Abernathy	9 receptions, 129 yards, TD

=== at Georgetown ===
No. 10 Lehigh Mountain Hawks (1–0) at Georgetown Hoyas (0–0) – Game summary

Quarter	1	2	3	4	Total
No. 10 Mountain Hawks	7	17	7	14	45
Hoyas	0	7	0	7	14

at Cooper Field • Washington, DC

- Date: September 5
- Game time: 12:30 p.m. EDT
- Game weather: Cloudy
- Game attendance: 2,386
- Referee: Bill McKeever
- TV announcers (ESPN+): Jeremy Huber and Christian Taylor
- Box score, Recap

Game information

First quarter

- LEH – Luke Yoder 4-yard run (Connor Poole kick), 8:21. Mountain Hawks 7–0. Drive: 11 plays, 68 yards, 5:52.

Second quarter

- GTWN – Michael Bonsu 22-yard fumble return (Thomas Anderson kick), 13:54. Tied 7–7.
- LEH – Luke Yoder 20-yard run (Connor Poole kick), 9:18. Mountain Hawks 14–7. Drive: 7 plays, 78 yards, 4:27.
- LEH – Luke Yoder 7-yard pass from Hayden Johnson (Connor Poole kick), 2:46. Mountain Hawks 21–7. Drive: 8 plays, 78 yards, 4:10.
- LEH – Connor Poole 27-yard field goal, 0:34. Mountain Hawks 24–7. Drive: 5 plays, 47 yards, 0:41.

Third quarter

- LEH – Luke Yoder 9-yard run (Connor Poole kick), 8:16. Mountain Hawks 31–7. Drive: 2 plays, 20 yards, 0:47.

Fourth quarter

- LEH – Joseph Marranca 2-yard pass from Hayden Johnson (Connor Poole kick), 13:08. Mountain Hawks 38–7. Drive: 7 plays, 71 yards, 4:01.
- LEH – Aidan Mayfield 12-yard run (Connor Poole kick), 3:56. Mountain Hawks 45–7. Drive: 11 plays, 70 yards, 7:25.
- GTWN – Jonathan Alexander 4-yard pass from Jack Johnson (Thomas Anderson kick), 0:24. Mountain Hawks 45–14. Drive: 13 plays, 75 yards, 3:32.

Statistics	LEH	GTWN
First downs	29	12
Plays–yards	73–573	56–239
Rushes–yards	54–302	31–115
Passing yards	271	124
Passing: comp–att–int	16–19–0	12–25–1
Turnovers	3	1
Time of possession	40:19	19:41

Team	Category	Player	Statistics
Lehigh	Passing	Hayden Johnson	16/19, 271 yards, 2 TD
Lehigh	Rushing	Luke Yoder	17 carries, 120 yards, 3 TD
Lehigh	Receiving	Anthony Feaster	4 receptions, 113 yards
Georgetown	Passing	Jacob Holtschlag	7/15, 71 yards, INT
Georgetown	Rushing	Jack Johnson	7 carries, 46 yards
Georgetown	Receiving	Jayvin Pyle-Thompson	2 receptions, 56 yards

=== No. 16 William & Mary ===
No. 16 William & Mary Tribe (2–0) at No. 9 Lehigh Mountain Hawks (2–0) – Game summary

Quarter	1	2	3	4	Total
No. 16 Tribe	0	7	0	13	20
No. 9 Mountain Hawks	16	21	0	7	44

at Goodman Stadium • Lower Saucon Township, Pennsylvania

- Date: September 12
- Game time: 2:00 p.m.
- Game weather: Sunny
- Game attendance: 5,240
- Referee: Cory Hanson
- TV announcers (ESPN+): Marco Socci and Lance Haynes
- Box score, Recap

Game information

First quarter

- LEH – Luke Yoder 1-yard run (Connor Poole kick), 12:26. Mountain Hawks 7–0. Drive: 4 plays, 69 yards, 2:08.
- LEH – Team safety, 11:56. Mountain Hawks 9–0.
- LEH – Luke Yoder 2-yard run (Connor Poole kick), 1:40. Mountain Hawks 16–0. Drive: 9 plays, 85 yards, 5:19.

Second quarter

- LEH – Nick Palumbo 22-yard pass from Derek Morgan (Connor Poole kick), 11:45. Mountain Hawks 23–0. Drive: 5 plays, 65 yards, 2:48.
- LEH – Johnson,Hayden 50-yard run (Connor Poole kick), 9:08. Mountain Hawks 30–0. Drive: 3 plays, 58 yards, 1:27.
- W&M – Jah'Kei Chavis 4-yard run (Max Lipinski kick), 1:54. Mountain Hawks 30–7. Drive: 4 plays, 74 yards, 1:45.
- LEH – Derek Morgan 8-yard run (Connor Poole kick), 0:02. Mountain Hawks 37–7. Drive: 9 plays, 75 yards, 1:52.

Third quarter

- No scoring plays.

Fourth quarter

- W&M – Jah'Kei Chavis 1-yard run (Max Lipinski kick), 13:01. Mountain Hawks 37–14. Drive: 10 plays, 75 yards, 4:32.
- LEH – Luke Yoder 11-yard run (Connor Poole kick), 8:35. Mountain Hawks 44–14. Drive: 7 plays, 75 yards, 4:26.
- W&M – Winston Watkins 1-yard run (pass failed), 2:42. Mountain Hawks 44–20. Drive: 16 plays, 79 yards, 5:48.

Statistics	W&M	LEH
First downs	19	25
Plays–yards	73–342	61–486
Rushes–yards	34–144	51–366
Passing yards	198	120
Passing: comp–att–int	25–39–1	7–10–0
Turnovers	2	1
Time of possession	27:42	32:18

Team	Category	Player	Statistics
William & Mary	Passing	Winston Watkins	18/22, 164 yards
William & Mary	Rushing	Andrew King	11 carries, 78 yards
William & Mary	Receiving	Kai Austin	10 receptions, 82 yards
Lehigh	Passing	Hayden Johnson	4/6, 84 yards
Lehigh	Rushing	Luke Yoder	23 carries, 169 yards, 3 TD
Lehigh	Receiving	Nick Palumbo	3 receptions, 71 yards, TD

=== Dartmouth ===
Dartmouth Big Green (0–0) at No. 7 Lehigh Mountain Hawks (3–0) – Game summary

Quarter	1	2	3	4	Total
Big Green	3	10	7	0	20
No. 7 Mountain Hawks	7	7	3	7	24

at Goodman Stadium • Lower Saucon Township, Pennsylvania

- Date: September 19
- Game time: 12:00 p.m.
- Game weather: Sunny
- Game attendance: 8,902
- Referee: Jay Johnson
- TV announcers (ESPN+): Marco Socci and Mike Yadush
- Box score, Recap

Game information

First quarter

- LEH – Luke Yoder 1-yard run (Connor Poole kick), 8:29. Mountain Hawks 7–0. Drive: 10 plays, 67 yards, 5:04.
- DART – Owen Zalc 50-yard field goal, 4:54. Mountain Hawks 7–3. Drive: 9 plays, 43 yards, 3:35.

Second quarter

- DART – Owen Zalc 51-yard field goal, 13:10. Mountain Hawks 7–6. Drive: 9 plays, 41 yards, 5:21.
- LEH – Nick Palumbo 13-yard pass from Derek Morgan (Connor Poole kick), 4:09. Mountain Hawks 14–6. Drive: 15 plays, 80 yards, 8:57.
- DART – KyDric Fisher 33-yard pass from Grayson Saunier (Owen Zalc kick), 0:35. Mountain Hawks 14–13. Drive: 9 plays, 75 yards, 3:34.

Third quarter

- LEH – Connor Poole 27-yard field goal, 6:38. Mountain Hawks 17–13. Drive: 16 plays, 65 yards, 8:22.
- DART – Myles Craddock 2-yard run (Owen Zalc kick), 0:02. Big Green 20–17. Drive: 10 plays, 75 yards, 6:36.

Fourth quarter

- LEH – Luke Yoder 2-yard run (Connor Poole kick), 8:41. Mountain Hawks 24–20. Drive: 11 plays, 75 yards, 6:21.

Statistics	DART	LEH
First downs	18	20
Plays–yards	59–324	59–291
Rushes–yards	29–62	46–218
Passing yards	262	73
Passing: comp–att–int	17–30–1	10–13–0
Turnovers	1	0
Time of possession	28:12	31:48

Team	Category	Player	Statistics
Dartmouth	Passing	Grayson Saunier	17/30, 262 yards, TD, INT
Dartmouth	Rushing	Myles Craddock	13 carries, 33 yards, TD
Dartmouth	Receiving	Nick Lemon	5 receptions, 102 yards
Lehigh	Passing	Derek Morgan	10/13, 73 yards, TD
Lehigh	Rushing	Luke Yoder	27 carries, 150 yards, 2 TD
Lehigh	Receiving	Nick Palumbo	6 receptions, 52 yards, TD

=== at Penn ===
No. 6 Lehigh Mountain Hawks (4–0) at Penn Quakers (1–0) – Game summary

Quarter	1	2	3	4	Total
No. 6 Mountain Hawks	3	0	14	3	20
Quakers	0	0	0	7	7

at Franklin Field • Philadelphia, Pennsylvania

- Date: September 26
- Game time: 1:00 p.m.
- Game weather: Rain • Temperature: 60 °F (16 °C) • Wind: N at 25 miles per hour (40 km/h)
- Game attendance: 1,839
- Referee: Tom Zetts
- TV announcers (ESPN+): Joe Tordy, Joe Valerio and Anna Camden
- Box score, Recap

Game information

First quarter

- LEH – Connor Poole 48-yard field goal, 1:47. Mountain Hawks 3–0. Drive: 9 plays, 22 yards, 4:30.

Second quarter

- No scoring plays.

Third quarter

- LEH – Derek Morgan 11-yard run (Connor Poole kick), 10:37. Mountain Hawks 10–0. Drive: 4 plays, 28 yards, 1:59.
- LEH – Jamaire Harden 20 yd pass from Derek Morgan (Connor Poole kick), 6:16. Mountain Hawks 17–0. Drive: 4 plays, 33 yards, 2:08.

Fourth quarter

- LEH – Connor Poole 29-yard field goal, 10:13. Mountain Hawks 20–0. Drive: 7 plays, 30 yards, 3:56.
- PENN – Tommy Lafayette 1-yard run (Mason Walters kick), 2:14. Mountain Hawks 20–7. Drive: 13 plays, 74 yards, 2:47.

Statistics	LEH	PENN
First downs	14	12
Plays–yards	63–217	67–174
Rushes–yards	47–168	29–41
Passing yards	49	133
Passing: comp–att–int	7–16–0	18–38–2
Turnovers	0	2
Time of possession	32:39	27:21

Team	Category	Player	Statistics
Lehigh	Passing	Derek Morgan	7/16, 49 yards, TD
Lehigh	Rushing	Luke Yoder	19 carries, 74 yards
Lehigh	Receiving	Jamaire Harden	2 receptions, 25 yards
Penn	Passing	Miles Teodecki	18/37, 133 yards, 2 INT
Penn	Rushing	Tommy Lafayette	11 carries, 41 yards, TD
Penn	Receiving	Mason Page	8 receptions, 44 yards

=== Fordham ===
Fordham Rams (1–4) at No. 6 Lehigh Mountain Hawks (5–0) – Game summary

Quarter	1	2	3	4	Total
Rams	0	0	0	0	0
No. 6 Mountain Hawks	0	31	3	0	34

at Goodman Stadium • Bethlehem, Pennsylvania

- Date: October 3, 2026
- Game time: 12:00 p.m.
- Game weather: Sunny
- Game attendance: 5,033
- Referee: Jeremy DeAngulo
- TV announcers (ESPN+): Marco Socci and Lance Haynes
- Box score, Recap

Game information

First quarter

- No scoring plays.

Second quarter

- LEH – Anthony Feaster 30-yard pass from Derek Morgan (Connor Poole kick), 13:32. Mountain Hawks 7–0. Drive: 11 plays, 98 yards, 5:44.
- LEH – Aiden Schomp 10-yard pass from Derek Morgan (Connor Poole kick), 2:50. Mountain Hawks 14–0. Drive: 6 plays, 55 yards, 4:08.
- LEH – Luke Yoder 10-yard run (Connor Poole kick), 0:44. Mountain Hawks 21–0. Drive: 6 plays, 30 yards, 2:00.
- LEH – Anthony Feaster 29-yard pass from Derek Morgan (Connor Poole kick), 0:19. Mountain Hawks 28–0. Drive: 1 plays, 29 yards, 0:05.
- LEH – Connor Poole 26-yard field goal, 0:00. Mountain Hawks 31–0. Drive: 2 plays, 0 yards, 0:06.

Third quarter

- LEH – Connor Poole 29-yard field goal, 8:42. Mountain Hawks 34–0. Drive: 4 plays, 3 yards, 2:04.

Fourth quarter

- No scoring plays.

Statistics	FOR	LEH
First downs	18	16
Plays–yards	68–255	58–392
Rushes–yards	21–42	37–240
Passing yards	213	152
Passing: comp–att–int	25–47–3	10–21–0
Turnovers	5	0
Time of possession	28:29	31:31

Team	Category	Player	Statistics
Fordham	Passing	Gunnar Smith	22/44, 190 yards, 3 INT
Fordham	Rushing	Jamell James	5 carries, 10 yards
Fordham	Receiving	Ricky Gonzalez II	8 receptions, 56 yards
Lehigh	Passing	Derek Morgan	10/20, 152 yards, 3 TD
Lehigh	Rushing	Luke Yoder	20 carries, 171 yards, TD
Lehigh	Receiving	Anthony Feaster	3 receptions, 67 yards, 2 TD

=== at Cornell ===
No. 4 Lehigh Mountain Hawks (6–0) at Cornell Big Red (2–2) – Game summary

Quarter	1	2	3	4	Total
No. 4 Mountain Hawks	7	10	7	14	38
Big Red	14	17	7	10	48

at Schoellkopf Field • Ithaca, New York

- Date: October 17
- Game time: 2:00 p.m.
- Game attendance: 9,198
- TV: ESPN+
- Box score, Recap

Game information

First quarter
Second quarter
Third quarter
Fourth quarter

Statistics	LEH	COR
First downs		
Plays–yards		
Rushes–yards		
Passing yards		
Passing: comp–att–int		
Turnovers		
Time of possession		

Team	Category	Player	Statistics
Lehigh	Passing		
Lehigh	Rushing		
Lehigh	Receiving		
Cornell	Passing		
Cornell	Rushing		
Cornell	Receiving		

=== at Villanova ===
No. 11 Lehigh Mountain Hawks (6–1) at Villanova Wildcats (3–4) – Game summary

Quarter	1	2	3	4	Total
No. 11 Mountain Hawks	0	0	10	8	18
Wildcats	7	14	0	3	24

at Villanova Stadium • Villanova, Pennsylvania

- Date: October 24
- Game time: 3:30 p.m.
- Game attendance: 5,451
- TV: ESPN+
- Box score, Recap

Game information

First quarter
Second quarter
Third quarter
Fourth quarter

Statistics	LEH	VILL
First downs		
Plays–yards		
Rushes–yards		
Passing yards		
Passing: comp–att–int		
Turnovers		
Time of possession		

Team	Category	Player	Statistics
Lehigh	Passing		
Lehigh	Rushing		
Lehigh	Receiving		
Villanova	Passing		
Villanova	Rushing		
Villanova	Receiving		

=== Bucknell ===
Bucknell Bison (1–7) at No. 19 Lehigh Mountain Hawks (6–2) – Game summary

Quarter	1	2	3	4	Total
Bison	7	7	3	13	30
No. 19 Mountain Hawks	0	7	7	17	31

at Goodman Stadium • Lower Saucon Township, Pennsylvania

- Date: October 31
- Game time: 12:00 p.m.
- Game attendance: 4,313
- TV: ESPN+
- Box score, Recap

Game information

First quarter
Second quarter
Third quarter
Fourth quarter

Statistics	BUCK	LEH
First downs		
Plays–yards		
Rushes–yards		
Passing yards		
Passing: comp–att–int		
Turnovers		
Time of possession		

Team	Category	Player	Statistics
Bucknell	Passing		
Bucknell	Rushing		
Bucknell	Receiving		
Lehigh	Passing		
Lehigh	Rushing		
Lehigh	Receiving		

=== Colgate ===
Colgate Raiders (5–4) at No. 17 Lehigh Mountain Hawks (7–2) – Game summary

Quarter	1	2	3	4	Total
Raiders	0	0	0	7	7
No. 17 Mountain Hawks	10	13	3	7	33

at Goodman Stadium • Lower Saucon Township, Pennsylvania

- Date: November 7
- Game time: 12:00 p.m.
- Game attendance: 4,881
- TV: ESPN+
- Box score, Recap

Game information

First quarter
Second quarter
Third quarter
Fourth quarter

Statistics	COLG	LEH
First downs		
Plays–yards		
Rushes–yards		
Passing yards		
Passing: comp–att–int		
Turnovers		
Time of possession		

Team	Category	Player	Statistics
Colgate	Passing		
Colgate	Rushing		
Colgate	Receiving		
Lehigh	Passing		
Lehigh	Rushing		
Lehigh	Receiving		

=== at Richmond ===
No. 17 Lehigh Mountain Hawks (8–2) at Richmond Spiders (6–4) – Game summary

Quarter	1	2	3	4	Total
No. 17 Mountain Hawks	0	6	7	8	21
Crusaders	0	14	0	0	14

at E. Claiborne Robins Stadium • Richmond, Virginia

- Date: November 14
- Game time: 2:00 p.m.
- Game weather: Sunny • Temperature: 52 °F (11 °C)
- Game attendance: 4,845
- Referee: Terry Jones
- TV announcers (ESPN+): Bob Black (play-by-play), Chris Anderson (analyst) and Matt Smith (sideline)
- Box score, Recap

Game information

First quarter

No scoring plays

Second quarter

- (13:36) LEH - Luke Yoder 51-yard run, Connor Poole kick failed (Drive: 7 Plays, 80 yards, 3:32; LEH 6–0)
- (7:30) RICH - Jack Callaghan 5-yard pass to Bryce Allen, Kyle Bitsko kick (Drive: 10 Plays, 75 yards, 6:06; RICH 7–6)
- (0:13) RICH - Aziz Foster-Powell 1-yard run, Kyle Bitsko kick (Drive: 6 Plays, 55 yards, 1:07; RICH 14–6)

Third quarter

- (9:27) LEH - Patrick Coan 15-yard pass to Aiden Schomp, Connor Poole kick (Drive: 11 Plays, 75 yards, 5:33; RICH 14–13)

Fourth quarter

- (4:21) LEH - Joseph Marranca 0-yard run, Patrick Coan pass to Joseph Marranca for two-point conversion (Drive: 11 Plays, 69 yards, 6:42; LEH 21–14)

Statistics	LEH	RICH
First downs	15	21
Plays–yards	59–270	63–331
Rushes–yards	38–188	32–124
Passing yards	82	207
Passing: comp–att–int	10–21–0	23–31–0
Turnovers	0	0
Time of possession	28:44	31:16

Team	Category	Player	Statistics
Lehigh	Passing	Patrick Coan	10/21, 82 yards, TD
Lehigh	Rushing	Luke Yoder	28 carries, 147 yards, TD
Lehigh	Receiving	Nick Palumbo	2 receptions, 24 yards
Richmond	Passing	Jack Callaghan	23/31, 207 yards, TD
Richmond	Rushing	Aziz Foster-Powell	13 carries, 58 yards, TD
Richmond	Receiving	Quanye Veney	6 receptions, 94 yards

=== at Lafayette (The Rivalry) ===
No. 16 Lehigh Mountain Hawks (9–2) at Lafayette Leopards (4–6) – Game summary

Quarter	1	2	Total
No. 16 Mountain Hawks			0
Leopards			0

at Fisher Stadium • Easton, Pennsylvania

- Date: November 21
- Game time: 12:30 p.m.
- TV: ESPN+

Game information

First quarter
Second quarter
Third quarter
Fourth quarter

Statistics	LEH	LAF
First downs		
Plays–yards		
Rushes–yards		
Passing yards		
Passing: comp–att–int		
Turnovers		
Time of possession		

Team	Category	Player	Statistics
Lehigh	Passing		
Lehigh	Rushing		
Lehigh	Receiving		
Lafayette	Passing		
Lafayette	Rushing		
Lafayette	Receiving		

== Rankings ==
Ranking movements Legend: ██ Increase in ranking ██ Decrease in ranking
	Week														
Poll	Pre	1	2	3	4	5	6	7	8	9	10	11	12	13	Final
STATS	11	10	9	7	6	6	5	4	11	19	17	17	16		
Coaches	11	10	8	7	7	6	5	4	12	20	16	15	15		
