= Lehigh Mountain Hawks football =

College football program of Lehigh University

2026 Lehigh Mountain Hawks football team
- First season: 1884; 142 years ago
- Athletic director: Jeremy Gibson
- Head coach: Rich Nagy
- Location: Bethlehem, Pennsylvania, U.S. (Note: While Lehigh University is centered in Bethlehem, its athletic campus, containing Goodman Stadium, is in neighboring Lower Saucon.)
- Stadium: Goodman Stadium (capacity: 16,000)
- NCAA division: Division I FCS
- Conference: Patriot League
- Colors: Brown and white
- All-time record: 728–645–45 (.529)

NCAA Division II championships
- 1977

Conference championships
- Patriot League: 1993, 1995, 1998, 1999, 2000, 2001, 2004, 2006, 2010, 2011, 2016, 2017, 2024, 2025, 2026
- Rivalries: Delaware (rivalry); Lafayette (rivalry)

Uniforms
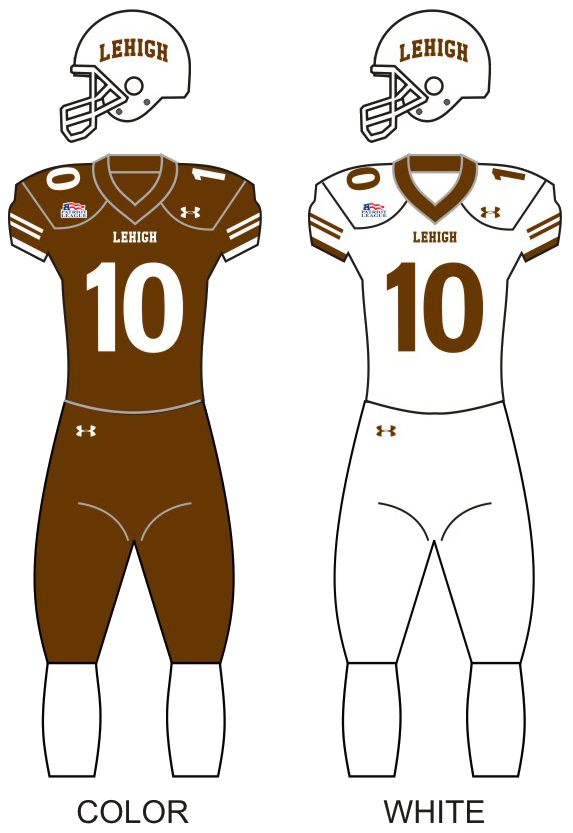
- Website: LehighSports.com

The Lehigh Mountain Hawks football program represents Lehigh University in college football. Lehigh competes in the NCAA Division I Football Championship Subdivision level as members of the Patriot League. The Mountain Hawks play their home games at Goodman Stadium in Bethlehem, Pennsylvania. Lehigh has won 15 Patriot League championships, including three straight championships in 2024, 2025, and 2026.

The program ranks 40th all-time in terms of wins with 680 out of 1,312 games played for a winning percentage of 56 percent. In the modern era since 1945, Lehigh has won at a 60 percent pace. The program's nationally-recognized rivalry with Lafayette in neighboring Easton in the Lehigh Valley region of eastern Pennsylvania, known as The Rivalry, is the longest-standing rivalry in all of college football with 160 games played since 1884.

The Lehigh football program began in 1884, when student J. S. Robeson organized a football team to play against the University of Pennsylvania's sophomore class team. Athlete and future journalist Richard Harding Davis was a part of that squad. "J. S. Robeson is the father of football at Lehigh," Davis was quoted as saying in Lehigh Quarterly in 1891. "It was he who induced the sophomores at the University of Pennsylvania to send their eleven up to play an eleven from the class of '86 on December 8th, 1884, and it was he who captained the Varsity team the following year," Davis said.

In 1884, Lehigh's intercollegiate team was formed, and Lafayette team captain Theodore Welles immediately approached Robeson to challenge them, establishing a rivalry which continues to today.

Since 1986, Lehigh has been a charter member of the Patriot League, formerly called the Colonial League. Lehigh has won thirteen Patriot League titles and has played in 20 postseason games, winning 10 of the contests. Along the way, Lehigh has won a Division II National Championship (1977) and has been national runner up in the I-AA tournament in 1979.

== History ==
=== Early years ===
Following the founding of the team, Lehigh, then known as the Engineers, was guided for the first eight years by volunteer coaches. The teams won 123 of those first 276 games (44%), playing an average about 9 games per season. Lehigh's first really successful period came in 1912 when Tom Keady was hired as head coach. During this period, Lehigh's program grew stronger and the team moved into its new home, Taylor Stadium. Taylor Stadium would serve as the home for Lehigh football for 73 seasons (1914–1987.) Along with the Yale Bowl and Harvard Stadium, Taylor was among the earliest concrete stadiums in America. Keady's teams would go 55–22–3 (68%) during his nine years as head coach and produce many fine players, including All American quarterback Pat Pazzetti.

=== Between the wars ===
The years between the end of World War I and the end of World War II were somewhat poor ones for Lehigh. Seven coaches came and went, managing a record of 73–124–17 (34%) during this time. Better days were coming though, in the form of a young head coach named Bill Leckonby. Leckonby arrived in time for the 1946 season and within a year, had the fortunes reversed. Leckonby's teams won 16 of their next 27 from 1947–1949. This set the table for Lehigh's first undefeated season, 1950. That team went 9–0, defeating Delaware, Carnegie Tech and Lafayette by a combined 125–0. Overall, the team outscored opponents by a score of 301–77. The team was led by the backfield tandem of Dick Gabriel and Dick Doyne. Gabriel's name is still etched in the Lehigh record books having achieved 42 career touchdowns, 16 TD's in a season and for having returned a kickoff 95 yards for a touchdown. Leckonby's teams would win 85 games in his 16 years as head man, and take the 1961 Lambert Cup in his final year. Leckonby's teams managed seven wins over Lafayette, including a 17–14 going away present in 1961.

=== Rebirth ===
A brief period of poor results came following Leckonby's departure. Between 1962 and 1964, the overmatched Engineers managed just five victories. They managed to go 2–0–1 against their arch rivals. Frederick Dunlap arrived for 1965 and was faced with a major rebuilding job. Dunlap's first three teams managed two wins. The 1966 squad was particularly challenged, managing just 106 points and zero wins during the year. Dunlap's plan for improvement was to implement the Delaware Wing T offense in an attempt to score more points. This offense was popularized by Delaware coach Tubby Raymond and featured misdirection, ball handling, multiple runners and numerous passing targets. The offense was perfect for a team with smaller players like Lehigh. Within a couple of years, Lehigh's version, coupled with good recruiting resulted in scoring and eventually wins.

By 1971, Lehigh, with quarterback Kim McQuilkin at the controls was scoring 362 points. The Engineers finished 8–3 that year and set a tone that would see plenty of points scored, many wins and a long line of excellent quarterbacks. Dunlap's teams would finish 36–13–1 (72%) over his final five years as coach. Dunlap returned to his alma mater Colgate University to coach and later serve as director of athletics. Dunlap's replacement was John Whitehead. Whitehead served as an assistant under Dunlap and success continued. Following a 6–5 first season, Whitehead led the Engineers to a remarkable 1977 season which resulted in a national championship. Lehigh had participated in two of the first three Division II tournaments (1973, 1975) so they were prepared for the rigors of post season play. Following a 9–2 year, Lehigh was invited to the tournament, but they had to play all games away from Taylor Stadium. Led by an explosive offense, Lehigh outlasted Massachusetts 30–23, outscored the University of California (Davis) 39–30, then clobbered Jacksonville State 33–0 in the Pioneer Bowl final in Texas. Lehigh spent one more season in Division II before joining the newly formed Division I-AA for the 1979 season. Lehigh finished 9–2 that season, made it to the national finals before losing to Eastern Kentucky 30–7.

=== Since 1980 ===
The past 40-plus seasons have been mostly successful at Lehigh. The program joined the new Patriot League and Lehigh has won more than 63% of its league games during this time. In addition to a national championship and national runner up status, Lehigh has won ten Patriot League titles, has participated in the FCS playoffs eight times, have been declared Lambert champs seven times as well as winners of 14 Middle Three championships (Rutgers, Lafayette). Over the years, Lehigh has had seven 9-win seasons, five 10-win seasons, two 11-win seasons and three 12-win campaigns. All but four of these marks came since 1975.

In 1988, Lehigh moved into Goodman Stadium, a 16,000 seat state of the art concrete structure located on the Murray H. Goodman Campus ("Saucon Fields", as informally known.) The new stadium is part of a complete sports complex serving the university, situated south over South Mountain, from the heart of the school. Goodman stadium was erected in 1988 in a dug out 'Bowl' that had long-awaited its arrival: but it almost never materialized as planned. (...) The bowl itself was constructed in the 1960s: an era of expansion and visionary plans for the school, working in close collaboration with partner Bethlehem Steel. However, with the advent of the 1980s, being a time of depression for B. Steel and the Bethlehem community generally, money and resources consequently dried up, forcing the University to consider more practical alternatives, such as leaving the team for the time being in the now older Taylor Stadium. Nevertheless, with a major contribution and renewed push by Murray H. Goodman, the administrators continued as planned.

During the 1990s, the NFL team the Philadelphia Eagles used Goodman Stadium and accompanying fields as their preseason camp and headquarters.

In 1995, the school changed the name of its athletic teams to “Mountain Hawks”, following much debate. Since 1950, Lehigh has enjoyed a 409–279–12 record, and since '98, the renaissance in football continued, with Mountain Hawks achieving a combined 129–48 record (72%). To further improve play, the Patriot League recently approved a plan allowing member schools to expand recruiting through the awarding of merit aid. These scholarships (60 over four seasons) will allow schools to expand their recruitment of student athletes by offering assistance to the vast middle class.

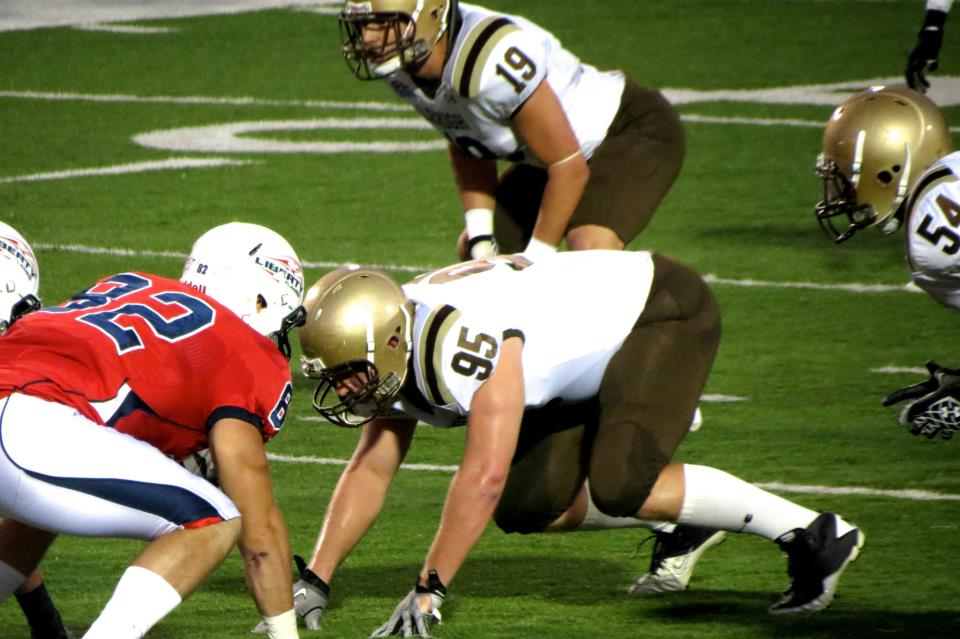
Lehigh players (right) line up on defense during a game against Liberty in 2012.

== Championships ==
=== National championships ===
Year	Association	Division	Head coach	Record	Opponent	Result
1977	NCAA (1)	Division II (1)	John Whitehead	12–2	Jacksonville State	W, 33–0

=== Conference championships ===
Lehigh has won fourteen conference championships, all in the Patriot League, nine outright and five shared.

Year	Coach	Conference	Overall record	Conference record
1993	Hank Small	Patriot League	7–4	4–1
1995	Kevin Higgins	Patriot League	8–3	5–0
1998	Kevin Higgins	Patriot League	12–1	6–0
1999†	Kevin Higgins	Patriot League	10–2	5–1
2000	Kevin Higgins	Patriot League	12–1	6–0
2001	Pete Lembo	Patriot League	11–1	7–0
2004†	Pete Lembo	Patriot League	9–3	5–1
2006†	Andy Coen	Patriot League	6–5	5–1
2010	Andy Coen	Patriot League	10–3	5–0
2011	Andy Coen	Patriot League	11–2	6–0
2016	Andy Coen	Patriot League	9–3	6–0
2017†	Andy Coen	Patriot League	5–7	5–1
2024†	Kevin Cahill	Patriot League	9–4	5–1
2025	Kevin Cahill	Patriot League	12–1	7–0
2026	Rich Nagy	Patriot League	9–2	7–1

† Co-championship

== Playoff appearances ==
=== NCAA Division I-AA/FCS ===
Lehigh has made 13 appearances in the NCAA Division I-AA/FCS playoffs, with a record of 7–13.

Year	Round	Opponent	Result
1979	Semifinals; National Championship	Murray State; Eastern Kentucky	W, 28–9; L, 7–30
1980	Semifinals	Eastern Kentucky	L, 20–23
1998	First Round; Quarterfinals	Richmond; Massachusetts	W, 24–23; L, 21–27
1999	First Round	Hofstra	L, 15–27
2000	First Round; Quarterfinals	Western Illinois; Delaware	W, 37–7; L, 22–47
2001	First Round; Quarterfinals	Hofstra; Furman	W, 27–24; L, 17–34
2004	First Round	James Madison	L, 13–14
2010	First Round; Second Round	Northern Iowa; Delaware	W, 14–7; L, 20–42
2011	Second Round; Quarterfinals	Towson; North Dakota State	W, 40–38; L, 0–24
2016	First Round	New Hampshire	L, 21–64
2017	First Round	Stony Brook	L, 29–59
2024	First Round; Second Round	Richmond; Idaho	W, 20–16; L, 13–34
2025	First Round Second Round	Bye Villanova	Bye L, 7–14

=== NCAA Division II ===
The Mountain Hawks, then known as the Lehigh Engineers, made three appearances in the NCAA Division II college football playoffs in 1973, 1975, and 1977, with a combined record of 3–2. They won the national championship in 1977.

Year	Round	Opponent	Result
1973	Quarterfinals	Western Kentucky	L, 16–25
1975	Quarterfinals	New Hampshire	L, 21–35
1977	Quarterfinals; Semifinals; National Championship	Massachusetts; UC Davis; Jacksonville State	W, 30–23; W, 39–30; W, 33–0

== The Rivalry ==
The annual contest between Lehigh University and Lafayette College has been in effect since 1884 and for 161 meetings. It is college football's most played rivalry. The discrepancy between the number of years and the number of games is due to the fact that the teams played each other twice a year prior to the turn of the 20th century. The game was not played in 1896. This was due to an issue involving the eligibility of a Lafayette player. Only twice have Lehigh and Lafayette played in a location other than Easton or Bethlehem, PA. In 1891 the teams played in Wilkes-Barre, PA. The 150th meeting of The Rivalry took place in 2014 and was played at Yankee Stadium in NYC. In 1950, Lehigh's victory ended a 15-year losing streak against Lafayette. In 1963, the game was delayed for one week due to the death of President Kennedy. In 1964, the 100th game ended in a 6–6 tie. In 1987 (game 123), Lehigh defeated Lafayette in the last game played at Taylor Stadium. Although Lafayette won the first game played at brand new Goodman Stadium in 1989, Lehigh has won 9 of the last 11 at Goodman, and 16 of 25 since Patriot League play began. Lehigh won the latest contest in 2025 and won an overtime thriller in 2009. The overall record stands at Lafayette 82, Lehigh 74. There have been 5 ties.

In recent years, Lehigh has enjoyed great success under winning coaches. Former assistant Kevin Higgins coached the team for seven seasons, compiling an overall record of 56–25–1 for a winning percentage of 68%. His teams captured four PL championships and went 30–9 in league play. Lehigh enjoyed high national rankings during this period. Lehigh went 6–1 against Lafayette under Higgins and was 2–3 in five playoff appearances. Both wins were road victories. Higgins joined the Detroit Lions of the NFL following the 2000 season. The coaching job went to Lehigh assistant Pete Lembo in 2001. Lembo's team promptly went 11–0 and won the Patriot League. The team made to the quarter finals of the national tournament. In Lembo's five years as head coach, Lehigh won 44 games, claimed two Patriot League titles, made two playoff appearances and dominated league play (26–7). His teams were also nationally ranked in three of the five years. Lembo took on the challenge presented by the Elon University and left Lehigh following the 2005 season.

Lehigh went outside of the program to hire Andy Coen. Coen had been offensive coordinator at the University of Pennsylvania. Coen had been a Lehigh assistant under Higgins, between 1995 and 1999. Under Andy Coen, Lehigh has compiled a winning record and has won over 69% of Patriot League games, including four titles. The 2010 team made it to the second round of the national playoffs, beating Northern Iowa on the road before losing to finalist Delaware the next round. The 2011 team lost only one regular season game, then entered the playoffs and claiming a one-point win at CAA champion Towson University. The Mountain Hawks lost in the semi-finals to eventual national champions North Dakota State. Although expectations were somewhat lower, the 2012 season turned out successfully. Lehigh went 10–1, and the team managed to win many close contests. The lone loss was to eventual league champ Colgate. Under Coen, Lehigh has managed to win 21 of the last 24 league games including 18 in a row. Lehigh has also won 31 of 36 games played overall, between 2010 and 2014. They capped the 2012 season with another win over Lafayette, 38–21. Now in his 11th year as Lehigh's head football coach, Andy Coen has compiled a 77-49 overall record and 46-18 in Patriot League action. The Mountain Hawks won the 161st edition of the rivalry 42 – 32 on November 22 at Fisher Stadium in 2025.

== Future non-conference opponents ==
Announced schedules as of January 2, 2026.

2026	2027	2028	2029
Dartmouth	at Montana	Princeton	at Princeton
at Penn	at Princeton		
at Cornell			

== See also ==
- List of NCAA football teams by wins
