= Ryan Manalac =

American football player and coach (born 1985)

Current position
- Title: Defensive coordinator
- Team: UConn
- Conference: Independent

Biographical details
- Born: October 20, 1985 (age 41)
- Education: University of Cincinnati (2008)

Playing career
- 2005–2008: Cincinnati
- 2009−2010: Buffalo Bills

Coaching career (HC unless noted)
- 2011−2015: Michigan State (Op. Asst.)
- 2016: Valparaiso (LB)
- 2017−2018: Ohio Dominican (DC)
- 2019−2020: Bucknell (DC)
- 2021−2025: Pittsburgh (LB)
- 2026−present: UConn (DC)

Ryan Manalac (born October 20, 1985) is an American former football linebacker for the Cincinnati Bearcats and Buffalo Bills and is the current defensive coordinator for the UConn Huskies. After graduating from Cincinnati, he was signed by the Bills as an undrafted free agent in 2009, and cut on August 16, 2010. He then entered the coaching profession.
