= Cyncir Bowers =

American football player

No. 23 – UConn Huskies
- Position: Running back
- Class: Junior

Personal information
- Listed height: 5 ft 9 in (1.75 m)
- Listed weight: 195 lb (88 kg)

Career information
- High school: Bishop McDevitt (Harrisburg, Pennsylvania); Central Dauphin East (Harrisburg)
- College: Iowa Central CC (2024); West Virginia (2025); UConn (2026–present)
- Stats at ESPN

Cyncir Bowers is an American college football running back for the UConn Huskies. He previously played for the West Virginia Mountaineers and Iowa Central Tritons.

== Early life ==
Bowers attended Bishop McDevitt High School in Harrisburg, Pennsylvania. He had 1,457 rushing yards on 128 carries, with 13 touchdowns and 288 receiving yards and two touchdowns. In 2022, Bowers rushed for 208 yards and had 195 yards receiving before he was dismissed for academic reasons. He then transferred to Central Dauphin East High School in Harrisburg, competing in the 100-meter and 4x100 relay events in track and field.

== College career ==
In 2024, Bowers played for the Iowa Central Tritons, where he had 1,008 rushing yards, 12 touchdowns and 24 receptions for 363 yards and two touchdowns. He also returned 13 kickoffs for 344 yards, including one for a 100-yard touchdowns and seven punts for 148 yards.

On May 9, 2025, Bowers committed to West Virginia University. He saw action in ten games for the Mountaineers, rushing for 249 yards and two touchdowns with eight receptions for 1324 yards and a touchdown. On December 31, Bowers entered the transfer portal.

On January 10, 2026, Bowers, committed to the University of Connecticut. On October 3, he rushed 16 times for 163 yards and two touchdowns with two receptions for 16 yards in a 41–42 overtime loss to Syracuse.
