= History of LSU Tigers football =

The LSU Tigers football team represents Louisiana State University in the sport of American football. The university has fielded a team every year since it began play in 1893, except in 1918 due to World War I. It has competed in the Southeastern Conference (SEC) since 1933, and in the conference's Western division since 1992. Previously, LSU was a member of the Southern Intercollegiate Athletic Association (SIAA) from 1896 to 1921 and the Southern Conference (SoCon) from 1922 to 1932. There have been 32 head coaches for the team, starting with Charles E. Coates in 1893. Since 2022, the head coach of the Tigers is Brian Kelly. LSU has played 1,221 games in its 123 seasons of play, and has compiled an all-time record of 772 wins, 405 losses, and 47 ties as of the end of the 2016 season.

== History ==
=== Early history (1893–1954) ===
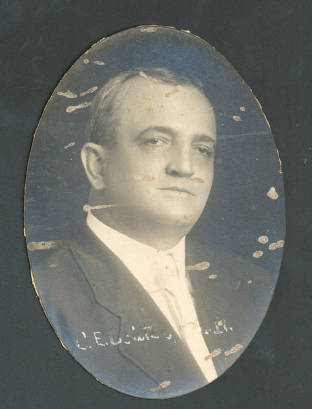
Charles Coates, LSU's first coach

Dr. Charles E. Coates, a chemistry professor at the university known for his work on sugar, and former football player at Johns Hopkins, assembled a group of students to create the school's first team. Coates' plan for a football team dated back to autumn of the previous year, when he assembled a team and held one or two scrimmages before shelving the idea for the following autumn. The team wore makeshift uniforms with purple and gold ribbons for its first game, a 34–0 loss to Tulane and the only game played by LSU that year. The game was played in front of a crowd of 1,500 at Crescent City Base Ball Park in New Orleans. The game sparked a rivalry between the schools that lasted well into the 20th century. Future Louisiana governor Ruffin G. Pleasant was the quarterback and captain of the LSU team. According to legend, purple and gold were chosen because they were Mardi Gras colors, and the green was sold out. (Note: An LSU baseball team had also worn purple and gold in its first varsity game against Tulane earlier in 1893, even though LSU's official colors at the time were actually blue and white.) The game was the only one Coates ever coached, and the only football game Pleasant played in. Pleasant was later inducted into the LSU Athletic Hall of Fame.

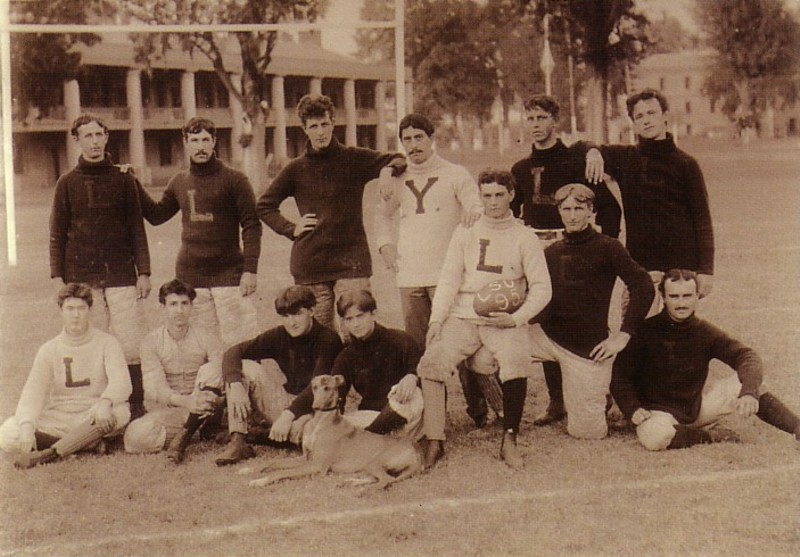
The 1895 team.

LSU achieved its first victory by beating Natchez Athletic Club 26–0 in 1894. Samuel Marmaduke Dinwiddie Clark has the honor of scoring the very first touchdown in LSU history. The first football game played on the LSU campus was at State Field on December 3, 1894, a loss against Mississippi. LSU's only touchdown in that game was scored by the head coach, Albert Simmonds. This was the first year of play for William S. Slaughter who lettered as an end for 5 years (1894, 1895, 1896, 1897, 1898). Slaughter was LSU's first five time football letterman. By 1895, LSU had its first win in Baton Rouge. In 1896 LSU hired Allen Jeardeau of Platteville, Wisconsin. LSU went undefeated, winning the school's first conference championship in the school's first year as a member of the Southern Intercollegiate Athletic Association (SIAA), the first southern athletics. conference. Tulane was forced to forfeit for its attempt to play Hall of Fame Penn back George H. Brooke. This was the first team to be called the "Tigers." The mascot was reputed to be named after the “Fighting Tigers,” the name of the 9th Louisiana Infantry in the Civil War. Coach Jeardeau returned for his second but final year at LSU in 1897 for two games in Baton Rouge. A yellow fever outbreak throughout the South caused the postponement of LSU's classes starting, and the football season being cut back to only two games.

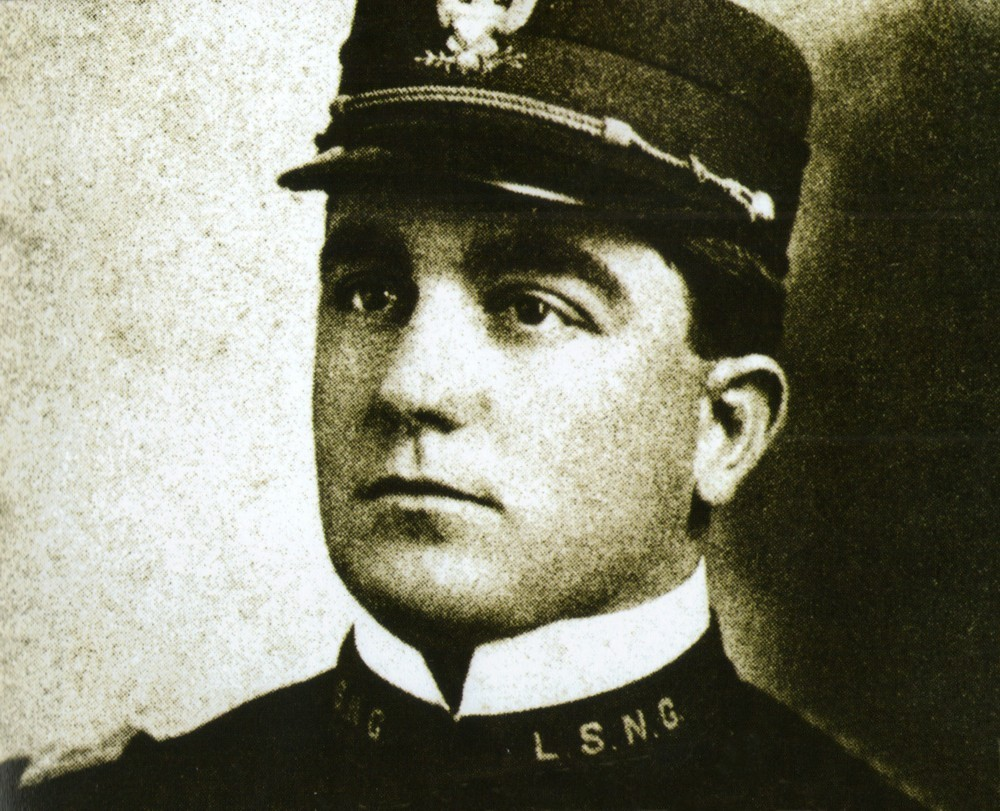
Chavanne as LSU cadet

Another outbreak of yellow fever similar to the one in 1897 caused LSU to play only one game in 1898. By the time LSU was able to play its only game of the season, Allen Jeardeau had departed from the school as head football coach, and no provision had been made to replace him. The job of coach then fell to the team's captain, Edmond Chavanne, thus the first LSU alumnus to coach the team. New coach John P. Gregg led the Tigers to a 1–4 season in 1899, including a loss to the "iron men" of Sewanee. The only wins were in an exhibition game against a high school team (which LSU does not officially record as a win) and against rival, Tulane. It was the first year of play for LSU's second five-year letterman, John J. Coleman (1899, 1900, 1901, 1902, 1903).

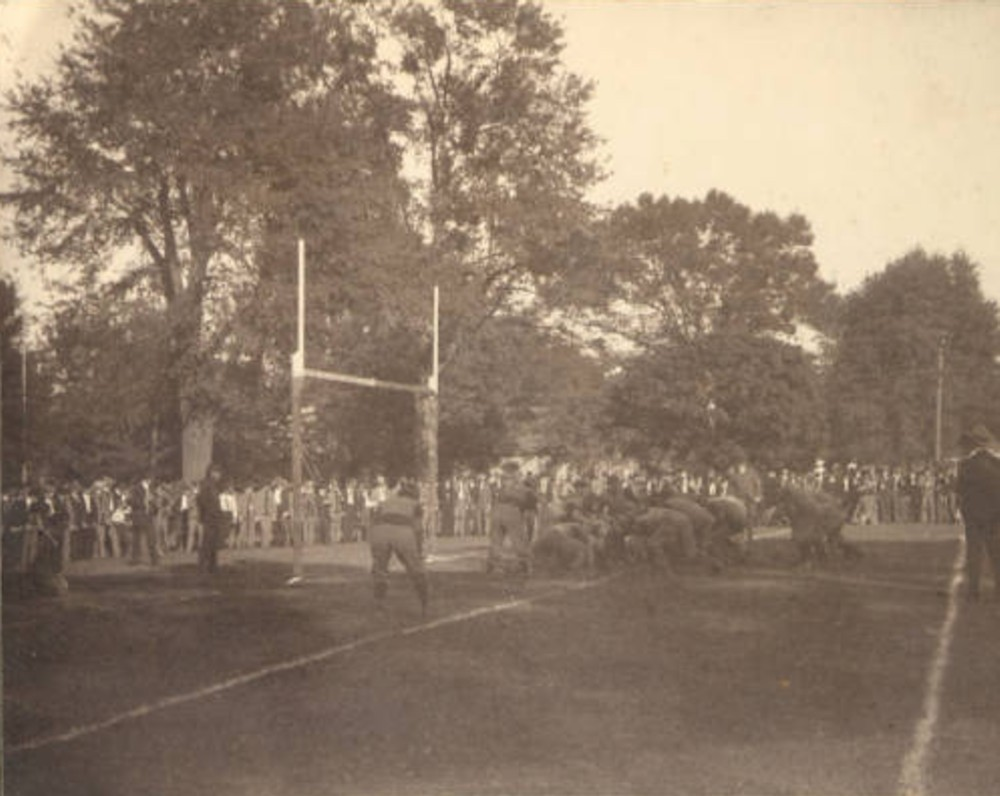
Auburn vs. LSU on State Field, 1902

Chavanne was rehired in 1900, posting a 2–2 record. Chavanne was replaced by W. S. Borland as head coach in 1901, leading the team to a successful 5–1 season. After the Tulane game, a 22–0 loss, LSU protested to the SIAA, and alleged that Tulane had used a professional player during the game. Several months later, the SIAA ruled the game an 11–0 forfeit in favor of LSU. The seven-game 1902 season was the longest yet for the Tigers and also featured the most games on the road. LSU upset Texas, avenged last season's loss to Auburn, and lost only to Vanderbilt, which claimed an SIAA title after the win. The 1903 season broke the previous season's record for most games played (seven) with nine games. Dan A. Killian coached the Tigers from 1904 to 1906. Back René A. Messa made some All-Southern teams in 1904. The 1905 team went 3–0.

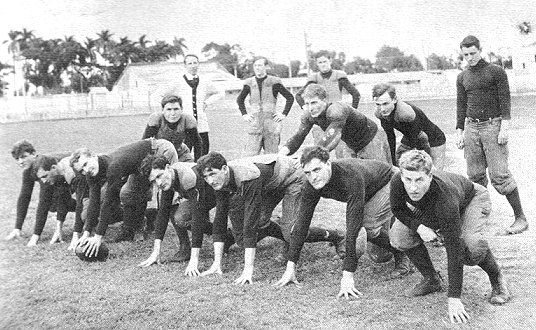
1907 LSU Tigers Football Team in Havana, Cuba for the 1907 Bacardi Bowl.

In 1907, LSU became the first American college football team to play on foreign soil in the Bacardi Bowl against the University of Havana on Christmas Day in Havana, Cuba. LSU won 56–0. John Seip ran back a 67-yard punt return.

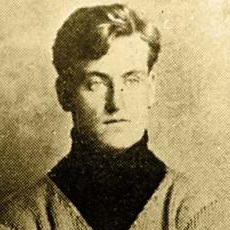
Doc Fenton

The 1908 team posted an undefeated 10–0 record. Quarterback Doc Fenton led the nation in scoring with 132 points, posting then school records of 36 extra points and 6 field goals. Mike Lally was his running mate in the backfield. LSU beat Auburn 10–2, Seip going over for the first touchdown. Auburn's 2 was had by a safety, after T. C. Locke blocked Fenton's punt. Fenton could not recover the fumble because he was knocked unconscious by a spectator's cane. The National Championship Foundation retroactively awarded 1908 LSU the national championship though it is not claimed by LSU. This season also led to an SIAA championship; but was clouded by accusations of professionalism from Grantland Rice and rival school Tulane. Auburn and Vanderbilt were among those listed as alternative conference champions. Both Fenton and Seip were inaugural inductees into the LSU Athletic Hall of Fame. 1910 was a disastrous year for the Tigers. After a strong 1909 campaign under coaches Joe Pritchard and John W. Mayhew, which saw their only conference loss come to SIAA champion Sewanee, the team lost some star power; Stovall, Lally, and Seip had all graduated.

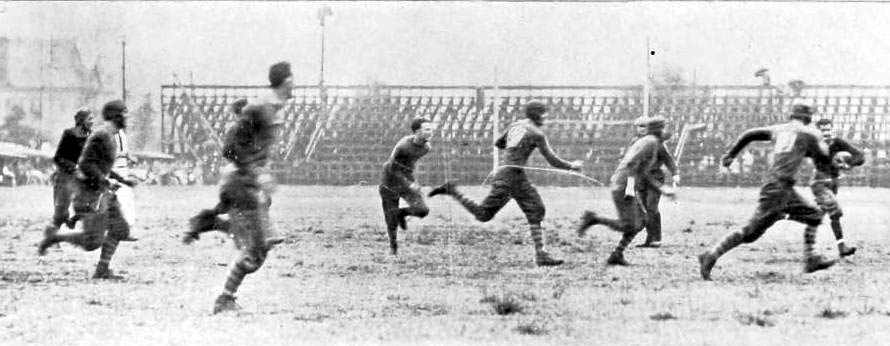
1914 LSU-Tulane

Pat Dwyer, an assistant at Auburn in 1908, was hired in 1911. He once used guard Tom Dutton for a "kangaroo play" in which back Lawrence Dupont would crawl between Dutton's legs; supposedly very effective in short yardage situations. The 1913 team lost only to SIAA champion Auburn by a touchdown. Fullback Alf Reid made All-Southern. LSU's largest loss margin came on October 31, 1914 in a game against Texas A&M in Dallas, Texas. The final score was Texas A&M 63, LSU 9. In 1916, Walter Camp gave Phillip Cooper honorable mention on his All-America team. Irving Pray and Dana X. Bible also served as the Tigers coach in 1916 Washington's Wayne Sutton coached the 1917 team to a 3–5 record.

LSU–Tulane, 1922

Irving Pray coached full seasons in 1919 and 1922, the inaugural season of the Southern Conference (SoCon). Branch Bocock led the Tigers for the 1921 season, in which they were beaten only by Tulane. Mike Donahue came from Auburn to be the seventeenth head football coach at LSU in 1923. The biggest win in Donahue's tenure was probably the 20–14 victory over Indiana in 1924. The final game of the 1924 season saw the first game played at Tiger Stadium, with an original seating capacity of 12,000, on Thanksgiving Day against Tulane. 18,000 fans managed to fit into the stadium to watch the Green Wave defeat the Tigers 13–0. In 1925, the team's first full season in Tiger Stadium began with shutout wins over Louisiana Normal and Southwestern Louisiana. The following week coach Wallace Wade's national champion Alabama blew-out LSU in Tiger Stadium, 42–0, which was at the time the worst home loss in school history. The 1925 team also beat John Heisman's Rice team, but ended the season with a second straight shutout loss to Tulane. Donahue resigned after the 1927 season, less than two months after signing a six-year contract extension with the team. LSU compiled a record of 23 wins, 19 losses, and three ties while with Donahue, which included a 5–14–2 record in SoCon games.

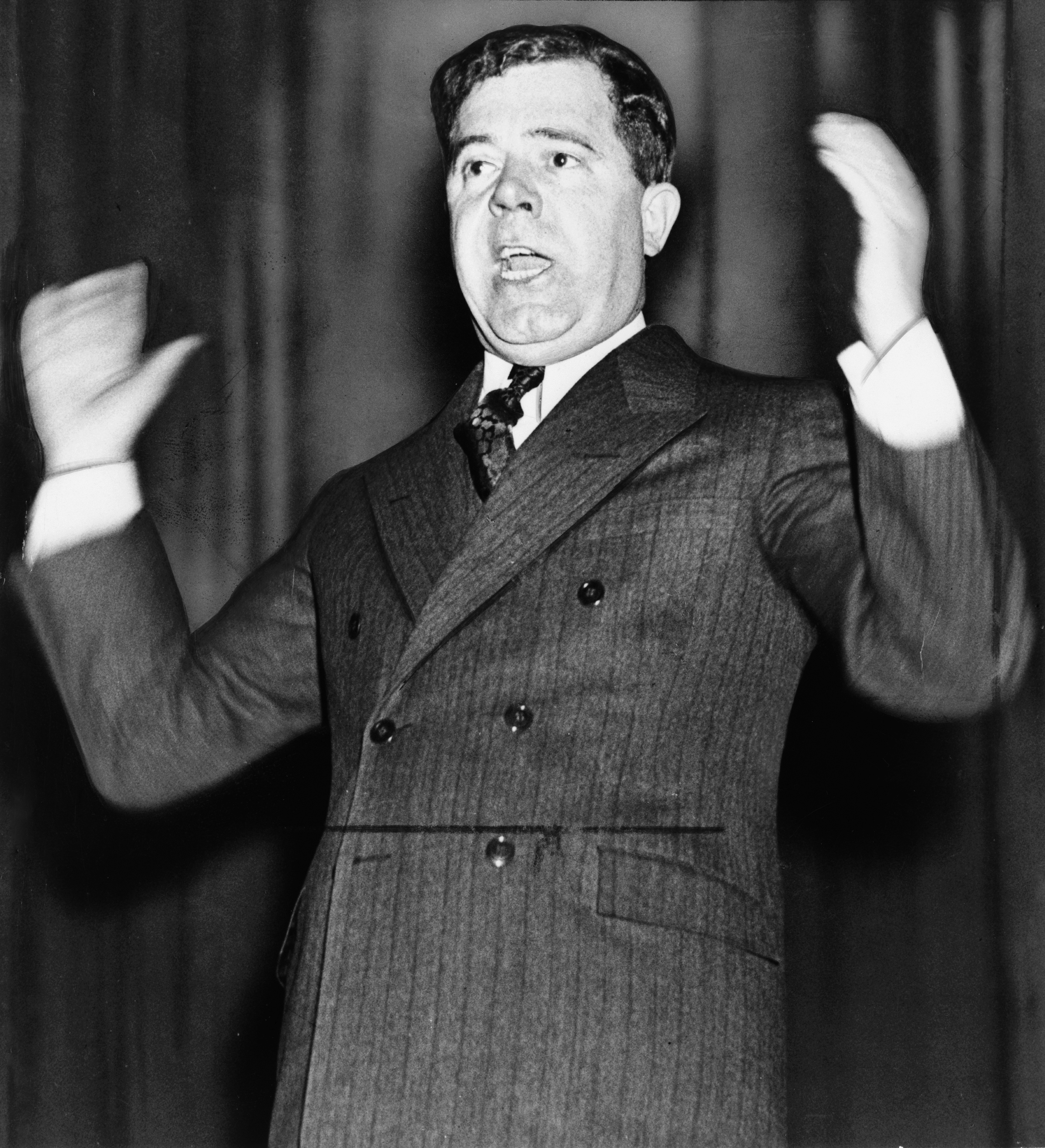
Louisiana governor and U.S. senator Huey Long was instrumental in building the program.

Vanderbilt coach Dan McGugin recommended Russ Cohen for the LSU job. Cohen's best year at LSU was his first, in 1928. Led by All-Southern captain Jess Tinsley, Tigers posted a 6–2–1 record, suffering losses to Arkansas and Wallace Wade's Alabama Crimson Tide. Star halfback Percy Brown broke his shoulder against Alabama. The tie was to Bill Banker and rival Tulane, which was as good as its ever been from 1929 to 1931. In 1931 LSU played its first night game in Tiger Stadium, a 31–0 victory over Spring Hill. Under West Point's Biff Jones, the 1932 team tied for the Southern Conference championship in its last season as a member of the conference. The 1933 lost no games and was led by track and field athlete Jack Torrance. Jones resigned after the 1934 season after a heated exchange with noted LSU supporter, Louisiana senator Huey Long. In the last game of the season, Long was displeased after the team had lost two straight games and were trailing at halftime to Oregon. Long decided to give a motivational speech to the team at halftime, but was turned away by Jones at the locker room door. The ensuing argument ended with Jones declaring to resign, effective at the end of the game. Gaynell Tinsley, the cousin of Jess, has a profile at the College Football Hall of Fame which describes him this way: "Tinsley was a magnificent athletic specimen, standing 6-0, and weighing 196-pounds, size he used equally well as a defensive stalwart who was a blocking master." As a sophomore in 1934, Tinsley had a 65-yard pass reception, thrown by halfback Abe Mickal, against Southern Methodist University, which stood as a record for several years as "the longest pass in Southern football history."

Gaynell Tinsley

Under head coach Bernie Moore, LSU won their first Southeastern Conference (SEC) Championship finishing with a 5–0 conference record and 9–2–0 overall in 1935. LSU played in their first Sugar Bowl game, falling to No. 4 TCU 3–2 at Tulane Stadium. The Tigers and Horned Frogs both took home the Williamson Poll national championship, which is not claimed by LSU. End Gaynell Tinsley was named a consensus All-American in 1935 and 1936, becoming the first All-America selection for LSU. Coach Moore once said, "Tinsley could have made All-American at any position. He was so tough, he made blockers quit. He's the greatest lineman I ever saw." Along with Tinsley in the line were Marvin Stewart, Justin Rukas, and Jeff Barrett. In the backfield were Mickal, Jesse Fatherree, and Pinky Rohm – all members of LSU's "Early Days" team of the century. The team's quarterback was Bill May, awarded the Jacobs Blocking Trophy in 1936. The 1936 team won the school's second SEC Championship finishing with a 6–0 conference record and 9–1–1 overall. The Tigers finished runner-up to Minnesota in the AP Poll. LSU won the Williamson Poll and Sagarin Ratings national championships, which are not claimed by the school. LSU's largest margin of victory, and most points scored in a football game came on November 21, in a game at Tiger Stadium against USL (University of Southwestern Louisiana, now University of Louisiana Lafayette). The final score was LSU 93, USL 0. The 1937 team featured Ken Kavanaugh and was upset by Vanderbilt using a hidden ball trick, the school's first-ever victory over a ranked opponent. This season also featured the first game in the Florida–LSU football rivalry, which was won 19–0 by LSU. In 1939, in a game against Holy Cross, Kavanaugh caught four touchdown passes in the 26–7 win. According to Kavanaugh and teammate Young Bussey, Kavanaugh found four rusty nails on the sideline during the game. The next week against Rice, he found another nail and scored another touchdown to give LSU a 7–0 win. The pattern continued against Loyola and Vanderbilt, as Kavanaugh found two nails before each game and in each scored two touchdowns. A sportswriter for the Baton Rouge Advocate claimed he saw coach Moore at a local store stocking up on nails before LSU's game against No. 1 Tennessee. Kavanaugh failed to score in the game, however, and the Tigers lost 20–0. The Nashville Banner named Kavanaugh co-MVP of the Southeastern Conference along with Bob Foxx of Tennessee. Kavanaugh was a consensus All-America selection for the 1939 All-America Team. The 1943 team was led by Steve Van Buren, moved to running back because of a lack of players due to World War II conscription, and won the Orange Bowl. Van Buren led the NCAA in scoring that season, with 98 points (110 including the bowl game). The 1946 team played in one of the most notable instances of the Cotton Bowl Classic – "Ice Bowl." LSU, led by head coach Moore and quarterback Y. A. Tittle, entered the game against Arkansas with a 9–1 record. Ice, sleet and snow pelted the stadium as LSU players filled oil drums with charcoal and started fires for makeshift heaters while fans built fires in the stands. LSU dominated the game with a 271–54 advantage in total yards and 15–1 advantage in first downs, but that did not equate to the numbers on the scoreboard; the game ended in a 0–0 tie and LSU finished the season 9–1–1.

In 1948, Moore retired, and Gaynell Tinsley, who had been working as an assistant, was promoted to replace his former mentor. The 1949 team made it to the Sugar Bowl, where it was swamped by Oklahoma. Tinsley became the first person to participate in the Sugar Bowl as both a player and a head coach. Tinsley's LSU teams never met with the same success they had achieved in 1949. In seven years as head coach at LSU, Tinsley's teams compiled a record of 35–34–6.

=== Paul Dietzel era (1955–1961) ===
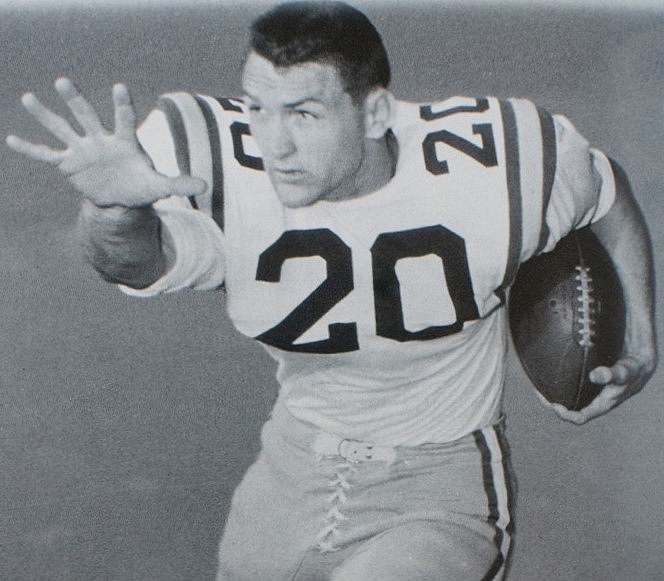
Billy Cannon

In 1955, Paul Dietzel became the head coach at LSU. Jim Taylor was an All-American in 1957, and led the SEC in scoring in 1956 and 1957. During Dietzel's first three years, none of his teams had a winning season.

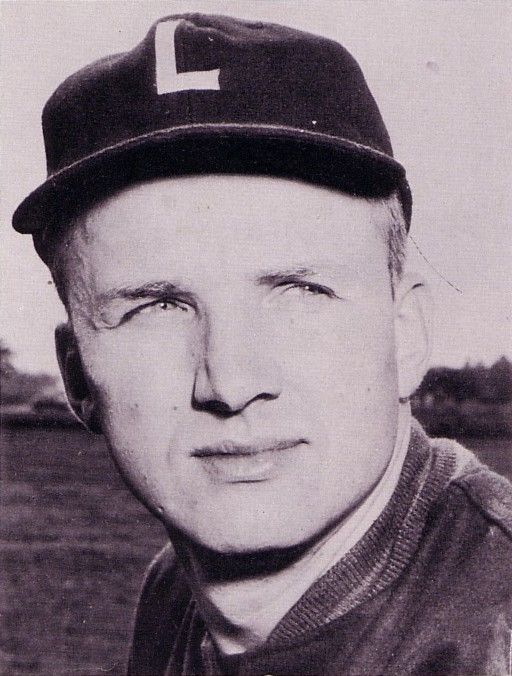
Paul Dietzel

In 1958, however, Dietzel came up with a unique "three-platoon system." Instead of replacing individual players during the game, Dietzel would bring in an entirely new set of players between plays and series. The three teams were called the White Team (the first-string offense and defense), the Gold (Go) Team (the second-string offense), and the Chinese Bandits (the second-string defense). The system worked, as the 1958 team won the school's first claimed national championship, beating No. 12 Clemson 7–0 in the Sugar Bowl. The only score was a pass from Billy Cannon to sophomore Mickey Mangham, one of the smallest players on the team. Cannon won the Heisman Trophy in 1959. On Halloween, late in the game between No. 1 LSU and No. 3 Ole Miss, LSU was trailing 3–0. Cannon returned a punt 89 yards for a TD, breaking seven tackles. This has become known as Cannon's Halloween Run. The Rebels then drove down the field but were stopped on the LSU 1-yard line as the game ended resulting in a 7–3 victory for LSU in Tiger Stadium. In the Sugar Bowl, one of the most anticipated rematches in college football history took place. This game, however, would not be the classic that transpired only weeks before. Ole Miss dominated the game from start to finish and came away with a decisive 21–0 win over the Tigers. LSU finished the season having only given up 29 points.

=== Charles McClendon era (1962–1979) ===
Dietzel left for Army after the 1961 season, and Charles "Charlie" McClendon, an assistant since 1953, was named his successor. McClendon picked up where McLendon left off, with three top ten finishes in his first four years. Doug Moreau broke Fenton's record of 6 field goals in 1965. In the 1966 Cotton Bowl, unranked LSU upset undefeated and No. 2 ranked Arkansas, winning the game 14–7 and snapping Arkansas' 22-game winning streak.

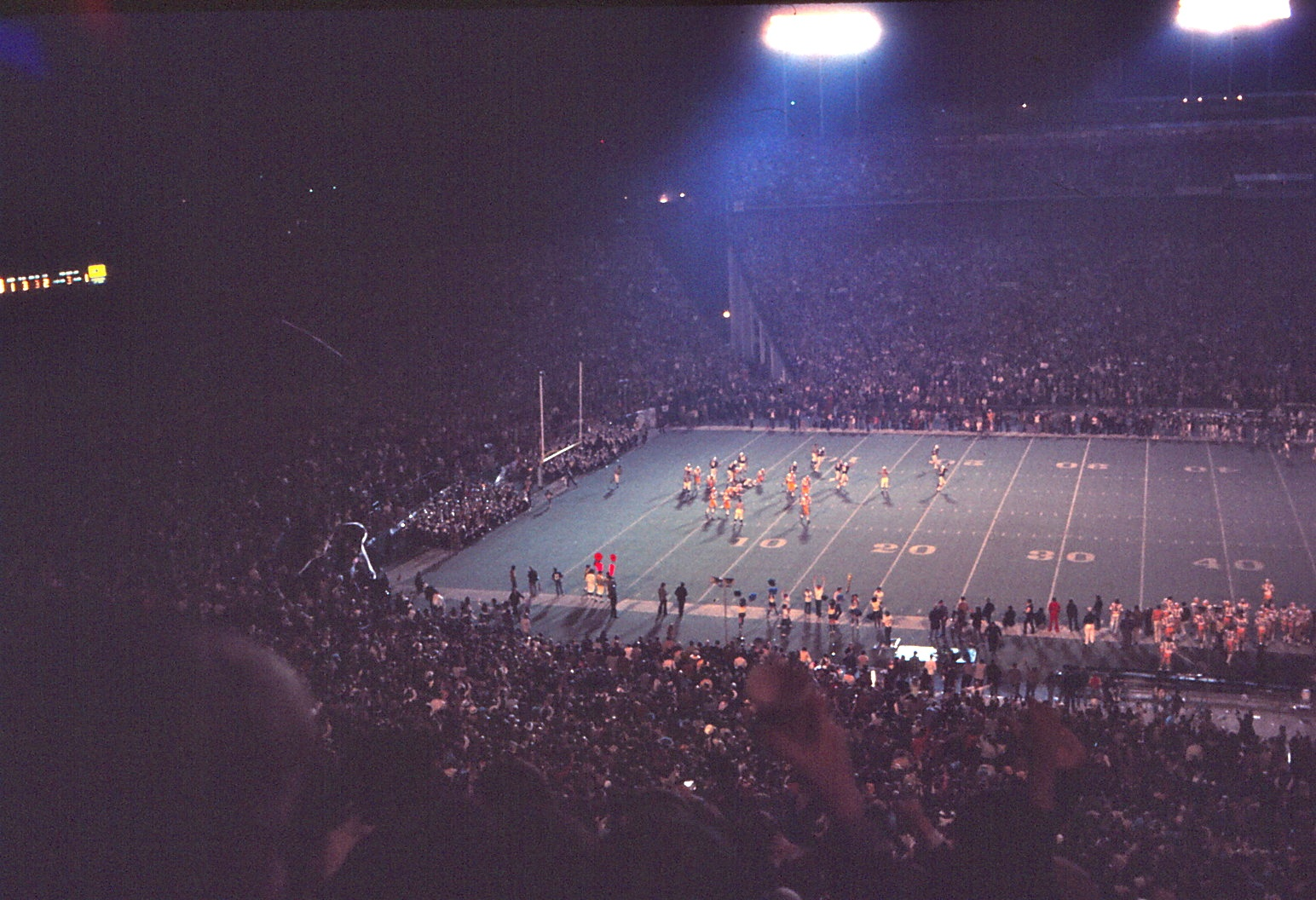
LSU vs. Tulane, 1973

In 1972, number 6 LSU survived an upset bid from unranked Ole Miss in Tiger Stadium by winning the game on a touchdown pass from quarterback Bert Jones to running back Brad Davis. Ole Miss fans say the 1972 contest featured a few seconds of free football. The Tigers trailed the Rebels 16–10 with four seconds to play. After a lengthy incompletion by Jones, the game clock still showed one second remaining. The Tigers used the precious second to win the game on the last play, 17–16. A song was written to commemorate the game, called One Second Blues, which is featured on the album "Hey Fightin' Tigers". The alleged home-clock advantage inspired a sign at the Louisiana state line, leaving Mississippi, reading, "You are now entering Louisiana. Set your clocks back four seconds." For that year, the Ole Miss yearbook reported the score for the game as "Ole Miss 16, LSU 10 + 7 ".

==== Bo Rein tragedy ====
After having just four coaches over 44 years from 1935 to 1979, the team went through eight coaches in a 20-year period from 1980 to 1999. This stretch began with the death of Bo Rein in a plane crash before coaching a single game for the Tigers. Following the 1979 season, NC State head coach Bo Rein was hired to replace McClendon as LSU's head coach. In January 1980, Rein took a recruiting trip to Shreveport, Louisiana. On his January 10, 1980, return trip back to Baton Rouge, Louisiana, his private aircraft crashed, leaving no survivors.

Rein and experienced pilot Louis Benscotter left Shreveport in a Cessna 441 aircraft. The flight was planned to be a 40-minute trip, but when Benscotter rerouted east to avoid a storm, air traffic control lost contact with him. The aircraft climbed to 40,000 feet and kept heading due east. After being tracked on radar, the aircraft was eventually intercepted by U.S. Air National Guard Convair F-106 Delta Dart fighter aircraft over North Carolina, a thousand miles off-course and at an altitude of 41,600 ft (12,700 m), 6,600 ft (2,000 m) feet higher than its maximum certified ceiling. The military pilots could not see anyone in the cockpit and the aircraft continued on over the Atlantic Ocean, where it crashed after running out of fuel. A US Coast Guard crew spotted some debris, but no wreckage was ever recovered. The bodies of Rein and Benscotter have never been found. The cause of the crash is undetermined but was most likely cabin depressurization causing hypoxia, a lack of oxygen, resulting in the occupants losing consciousness as in the 1999 South Dakota Learjet crash. Rein's two-month stint at LSU is the fourth shortest head coaching stint in FBS history, behind only George O'Leary's five-day tenure at Notre Dame in December 2001, Mike Haywood's sixteen-day stint at Pittsburgh in December 2010 and Manny Diaz's eighteen-day stint as Temple head coach in December 2018.

=== Jerry Stovall era (1980–1983) ===
Jerry Stovall was hired to replace Rein as head coach in 1980. LSU defeated Alabama 20–10 in Birmingham, Alabama in Bear Bryant's last game coaching against LSU, in 1982. LSU's defense held Alabama to 119 yards of total offense, as the Tigers defeated the Tide for the first time since 1970. "You don't understand how it feels to get hit in the mouth for 11 years," Stovall said in the locker room after the game. "This is going to feel pretty good when it soaks in." 1983 was the first season calling LSU football for radio play-by-play man Jim Hawthorne, who served in this role until the 2016 season and became known as the "Voice of the Tigers". LSU finished that season with a record of 4–7, and Stovall was dismissed as LSU's head coach.

=== Bill Arnsparger era (1984–1986) ===
Only two hours after the firing of Stovall, LSU hired Miami Dolphins defensive coordinator Bill Arnsparger as head coach. As the LSU head coach, Arnsparger led the Tigers to two Sugar Bowl berths in three seasons, in 1984 and 1986, both times against Nebraska. In 1984, LSU finished in a tie for second behind Florida, but the Southeastern Conference (SEC) presidents voted to strip Florida of the conference championship due to NCAA rules violations and LSU participated in the Sugar Bowl instead. His 1986 LSU squad won the school's first outright SEC title since 1970 and the Tigers' last in the pre-championship game era, though the season was marred somewhat by an upset home loss to Miami University, his alma mater. By 1985, Arnsparger was growing frustrated with various scandals in the LSU athletic department, particularly involving basketball coach Dale Brown. After Sports Illustrated ran a cover story about the university's issues, Arnsparger met privately with athletic director Bob Brodhead to complain that the negative coverage was harming football recruiting and to threaten to leave the school if something wasn't done. Shortly after the final regular season game in 1986, Arnsparger announced he was resigning to become the athletic director at Florida.

=== Mike Archer era (1987–1990) ===
Mike Archer came to LSU as an assistant coach in 1984 after being both a player and an assistant coach at Miami. He replaced Bill Arnsparger as the LSU Tigers football head coach in 1987 when Arnsparger left to become the athletic director at the University of Florida. Archer was Arnsparger's defensive coordinator in 1985 and 1986, and was Arnsparger's hand-picked successor. When Archer took the LSU head coaching job, he was 34 years old, the youngest head coach in Division I-A football. Archer was chosen over a number of interviewed candidates, which reportedly included Steve Spurrier, Mike Shanahan, and Mack Brown.

In 1987, LSU finished the season ranked #5 in both major polls with a 10–1–1 record, blemished only by a tie against Ohio State and a loss to Alabama. The latter was all that kept the Tigers out of the 1988 Sugar Bowl; Auburn went instead. It was LSU's first 10-win season in more than 25 years. In 1988, unranked LSU staged a near-literal, earth-shattering upset victory over No. 4 Auburn in Tiger Stadium, winning the game 7–6 with 1:41 remaining on a touchdown pass from quarterback Tommy Hodson to tailback Eddie Fuller. The reaction of the crowd was so immense that it registered as an earthquake on a seismograph in LSU's Howe-Russell Geoscience Complex. It was later dubbed "The Earthquake Game" by ESPN. After back-to-back losing seasons in 1989 and 1990, Archer was forced to resign. He lost four of his last five games in 1990, the lone win coming in the season finale against Tulane.

=== Curley Hallman era (1991–1994) ===
Archer was replaced by Southern Miss head coach Curley Hallman. During Hallman's first season in 1991, several of Hallman's football players were accused of instigating a fight with LSU men's basketball players, including All-American Shaquille O'Neal, in Broussard Hall, LSU's athletic dormitory, two days prior to the Tigers' contest with Mississippi State. LSU started the 1991 season with one-sided losses to Georgia (31–10) and Hallman's alma mater, Texas A&M (45–7), and finished 5–6. The season marked the second time LSU suffered three consecutive losing seasons, and the first time since 1954 to 1956.

The 1992 season included being shut out 32–0 by Ole Miss on Halloween, and beaten 30–6 at Arkansas in the season finale, which was the first meeting between the Tigers and the Razorbacks upon Arkansas joining the SEC. The Tigers finished 2–9, still the worst in school history. In 1993, LSU's centennial football season, the Tigers lost 58–3 to the Florida Gators in Tiger Stadium, the worst loss in school history. Amazingly, just four weeks after that, the Tigers stunned the Alabama Crimson Tide, 17–13, at Bryant–Denny Stadium in Tuscaloosa, ending the Tide's 31-game unbeaten streak. LSU entered the season finale at 5–5, with a chance at its first bowl bid since the end of the 1988 season. However, the Tigers gave up 412 yards rushing in a 42–24 loss to Arkansas at home. The beginning of the end for Hallman came on September 17, 1994 at Jordan–Hare Stadium against Auburn. LSU led 23–9 early in the fourth quarter, and the Bayou Bengals were in good position to end Auburn's 13-game winning streak. But LSU quarterback Jamie Howard threw two interceptions that were returned for Auburn touchdowns, tying the game. LSU regained the lead with a field goal, but when the Bayou Bengals were trying to run out the clock, Howard threw his fourth interception of the game, and incredibly, Auburn returned the pick for another touchdown, giving the home team a 30–26 lead. LSU drove into Auburn territory in the game's final minute, but Howard threw his fifth and sixth interceptions on consecutive drives, sealing the win for Auburn. LSU never recovered, and ultimately finished 4-7. On November 12, LSU lost to Southern Miss, Hallman's former team, 20-18 in front of the smallest Death Valley crowd since 1974 (announced attendance was 51,718, but LSU officials estimated the actual crowd was closer to 40,000). Two days later, LSU athletic director Joe Dean gave Hallman an ultimatum–resign or be fired. When Hallman refused to resign, Dean fired him, though he was allowed to finish out the season. He closed out his career at LSU with a 30-12 win over Arkansas—the Tigers' first regular-season win in the series since 1956. His overall record was 16–28; his winning percentage of .364 is the worst for a non-interim coach in school history.

=== Gerry DiNardo era (1995–1999) ===
On December 13, 1994, LSU hired Vanderbilt head coach Gerry DiNardo as Hallman's replacement. That season, in an attempt to liven up the rivalry between LSU and Auburn, DiNardo had the team wear its white jerseys at home in Tiger Stadium for the first time since 1982. In the game, LSU upset No. 5 Auburn, winning 12–6 as LSU defensive back Troy Twillie intercepted Auburn quarterback Patrick Nix's 11-yard pass into the end zone with no time remaining. The Tigers completed that season with a 7–4–1 record and defeated Michigan State, coached by Nick Saban, in the 1995 Independence Bowl.

After nine straight losses to Steve Spurrier-led Florida, the No. 14 Tigers defeated the No. 1 ranked defending national champion Gators 28–21 in Tiger Stadium in 1997. LSU running back Kevin Faulk was featured on the following week's cover of Sports Illustrated with the title "See you later, Gators." It was the first time LSU defeated a No. 1 ranked team and the first time the goalposts were ever torn down in Tiger Stadium. In 1998, LSU started the season with a preseason ranking of No. 9. They climbed to No. 6 before losing to No. 12 Georgia on October 3. The next week the No. 11-ranked Tigers lost to the No. 6 Florida. After the loss to the Gators, LSU dropped 13 of the next 17 games, including losses to a No. 10 Notre Dame and No. 13 Arkansas later in the 1998 season. In 1999 LSU lost to No. 10 Georgia, No. 8 Florida, No. 12 Mississippi State, No. 25 Ole Miss, and No. 12 Alabama. On November 15, 1999, two days after the Tigers lost to unranked Houston at home, LSU chancellor Mark Emmert fired DiNardo with one game remaining in the season. DiNardo was given the option to coach the final game of the season against Arkansas, but DiNardo declined. Instead, offensive line coach Hal Hunter was named interim coach, leading LSU to a 35–10 victory over the Razorbacks.

=== Nick Saban era (2000–2004) ===
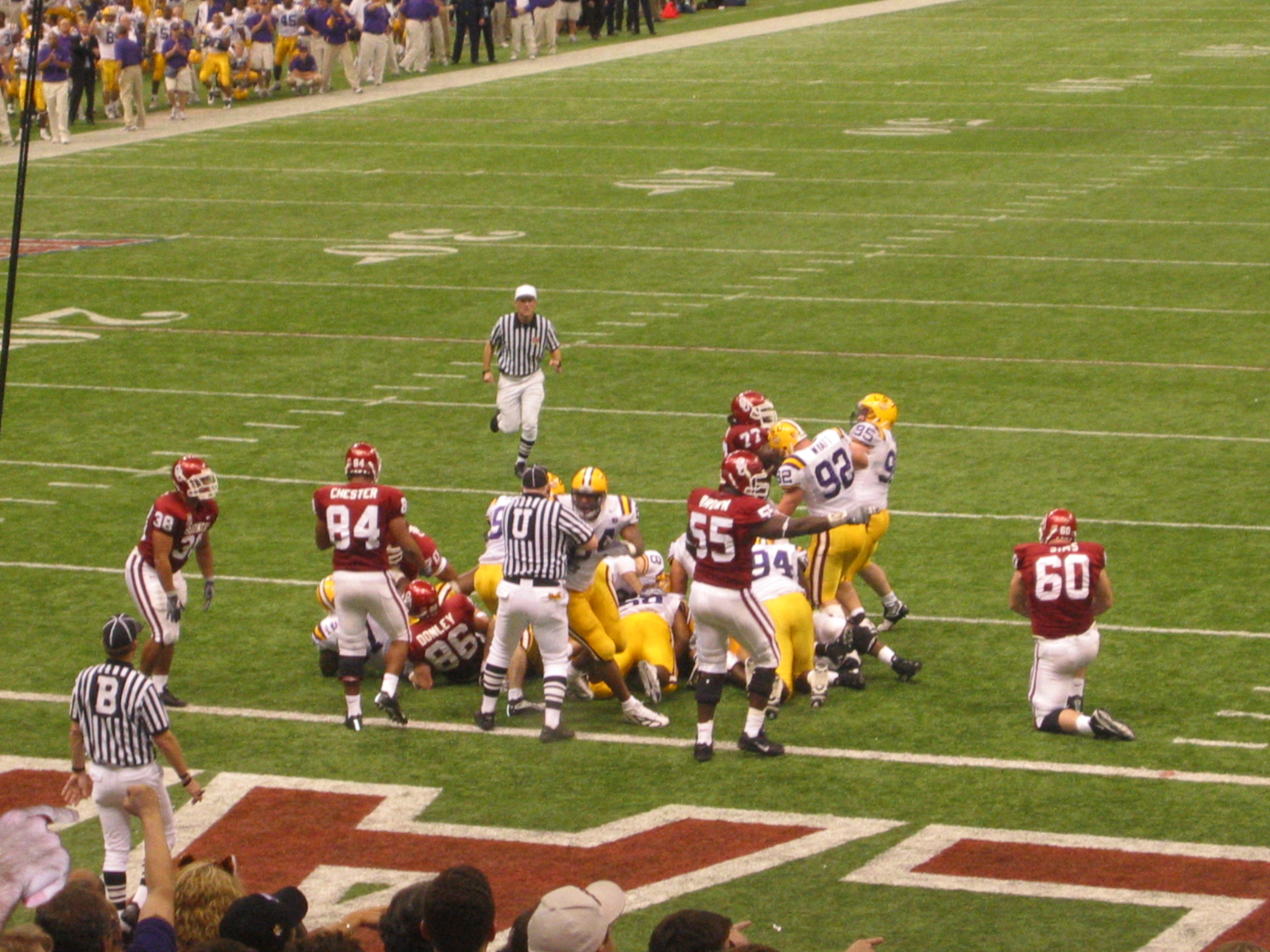
2004 Sugar Bowl, LSU 21 - Oklahoma 14

On December 1, 1999, LSU hired Michigan State head coach Nick Saban as DiNardo's replacement. In Saban's first season of 2000, LSU returned to national prominence by beating No. 11 Tennessee in overtime 38–31 on ESPN, after which the goal posts were torn down for only the 2nd time in the history of Tiger Stadium. The victory over Tennessee also marked the first time that LSU played in an overtime game at home. Just a few weeks later, the goal posts were again ripped down as LSU beat Alabama 30–28 on CBS in Baton Rouge for the first time in 31 years. This was the 3rd and final time that the goal posts came down in Death Valley. In 2001, No. 21 LSU staged an upset victory over No. 2 Tennessee in the SEC Championship, winning 31–20. The victory earned LSU a spot in its first Sugar Bowl since 1986, and knocked the Volunteers out of national title contention. No. 16 LSU survived an upset bid from unranked Kentucky in 2002 by winning the game 33–30 on a miraculous 75-yard Hail Mary pass as time expired known as the "Bluegrass Miracle". Kentucky coach Guy Morriss had received the traditional Gatorade bath right before the Hail Mary. Kentucky fans, believing they had won, had already rushed the field and torn down one goal post.

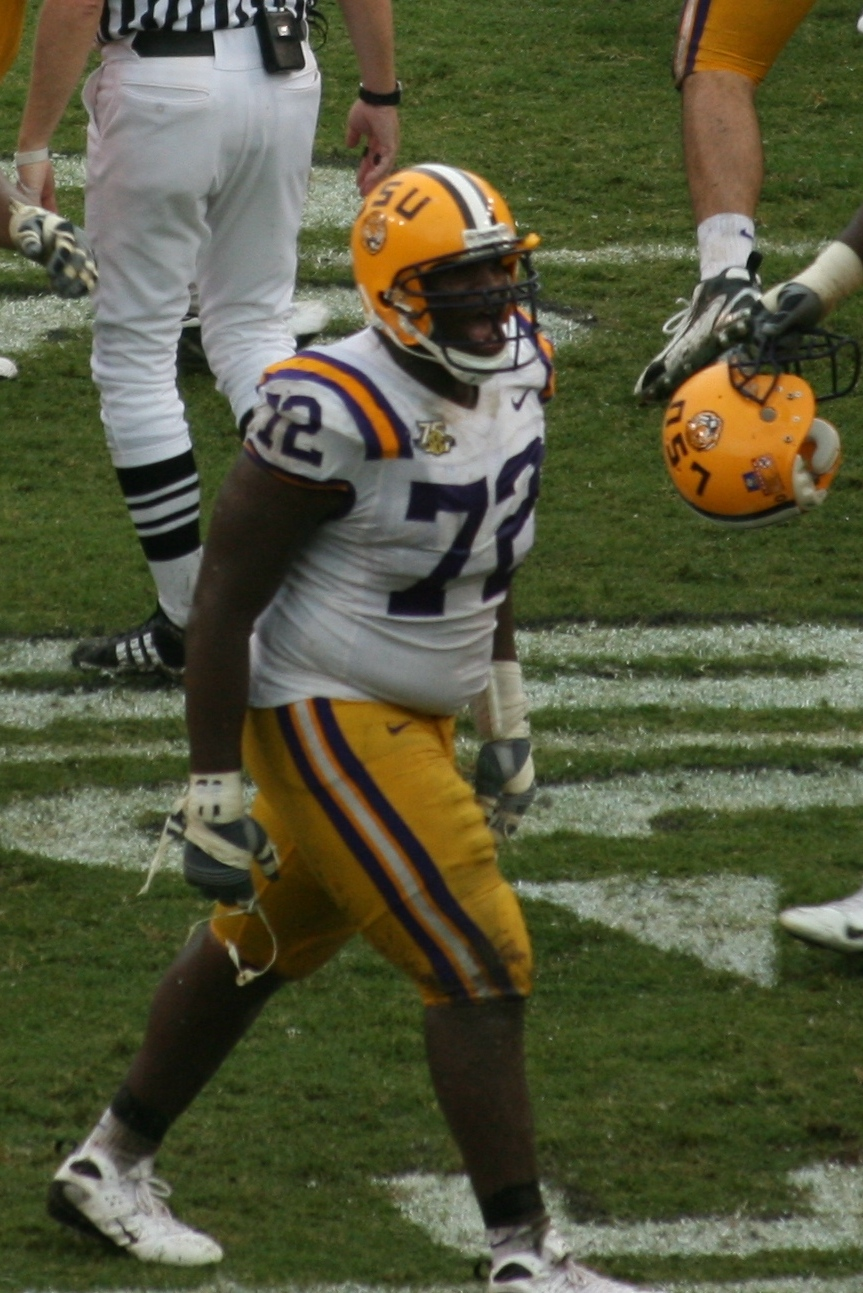
Glenn Dorsey

In 2003, No. 11 LSU outlasted No. 7 Georgia, 17–10. With ESPN College Gameday on hand for the first time since 1997, Quarterback Matt Mauck found wide receiver Skyler Green for a 34-yard touchdown with 3:03 remaining in the game. All-American cornerback Corey Webster sealed the victory with an interception in the final minute. The game is notable for the LSU fans chanting LSU-LSU after a Georgia touchdown. Georgia head coach Mark Richt was quoted as saying, "Usually when the opposing team does well, the crowd quiets down. All I began to hear was a chant 'L-S-U, L-S-U.' It got louder and louder and louder. It was the loudest I've ever heard a stadium." The win catapulted LSU onto the national scene. LSU won its second title and became the BCS national champion by defeating Oklahoma 21–14 in the 2004 Sugar Bowl (BCS National Championship Game).

=== Les Miles era (2005–2016) ===
On January 4, 2005, Oklahoma State head coach Les Miles was named the new LSU head coach. In Miles's first season in 2005 at LSU was moved to Arizona State's Sun Devil Stadium due to the effects of Hurricane Katrina. With one endzone painted with "www.KatrinaSRF.com" and the other with "Together We Stand" along with logos of the states of Louisiana and Arizona, LSU rallied in the fourth quarter for a 35-31 comeback victory. Trailing 17–7 in the fourth quarter, LSU returned a blocked field goal and punt for touchdowns to ignite the comeback. The lead went back-and-forth with Arizona State taking a 31–28 lead with 4:07 to play. Quarterback JaMarcus Russell then lead the Tigers on a 10-play, 91-yard drive capped with a 39-yard touchdown pass to Early Doucet on fourth-and-10 to give LSU a 35–31 lead. LSU's defense then stopped Arizona State on downs at the LSU 30-yard line to secure the victory. In 2006, Russell completed a touchdown pass to WR Early Doucet with 9 seconds to go to beat Tennessee in Neyland Stadium after a breakout performance by Tennessee backup QB Jonathan Crompton.

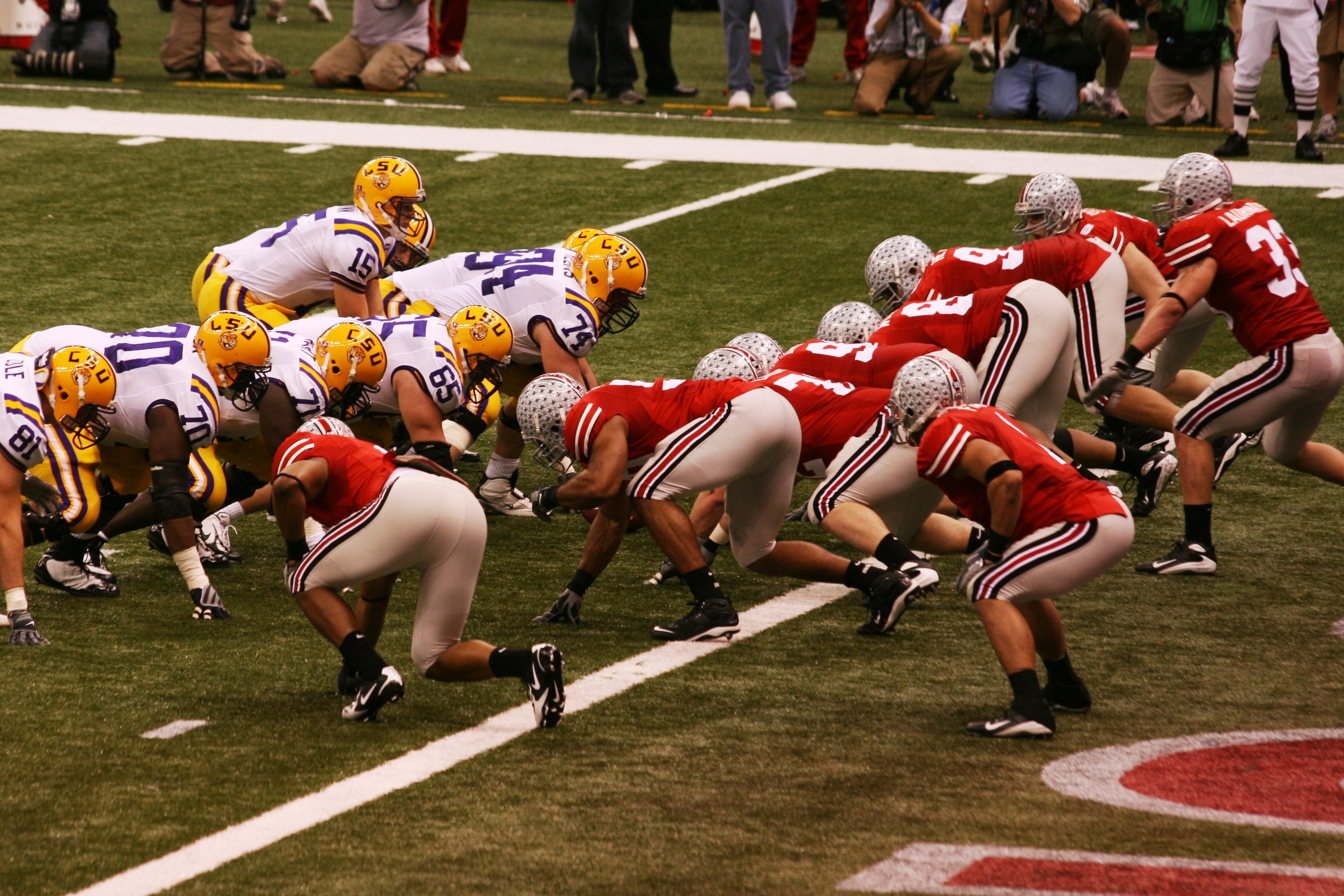
2008 BCS National Championship Game, LSU 38 – Ohio State 24

No. 2 LSU played what was hyped as one of the most exciting games ever played in Tiger Stadium against No. 9 Florida in 2007. The game is also known for the LSU students leaving thousands of messages on the phone of Florida quarterback, Tim Tebow, prompting him to give a "telephone" hand gesture to the LSU student section following an early touchdown. Florida began the fourth quarter with a 24–14 lead, but behind solid defense and being a perfect 5 for 5 on fourth down conversions, the Tigers were able to take the lead 28–24 with 1:06 left in the game after a Jacob Hester touchdown to defeat the Gators. It was LSU's first national primetime game on CBS since 1981. LSU went on to defeat No. 1 Ohio State in the BCS national championship 38–24, becoming the first school to win two BCS national championship titles and improving their BCS record to 4–0, the best of any team. They also became the first two loss team to ever play in the BCS national championship.

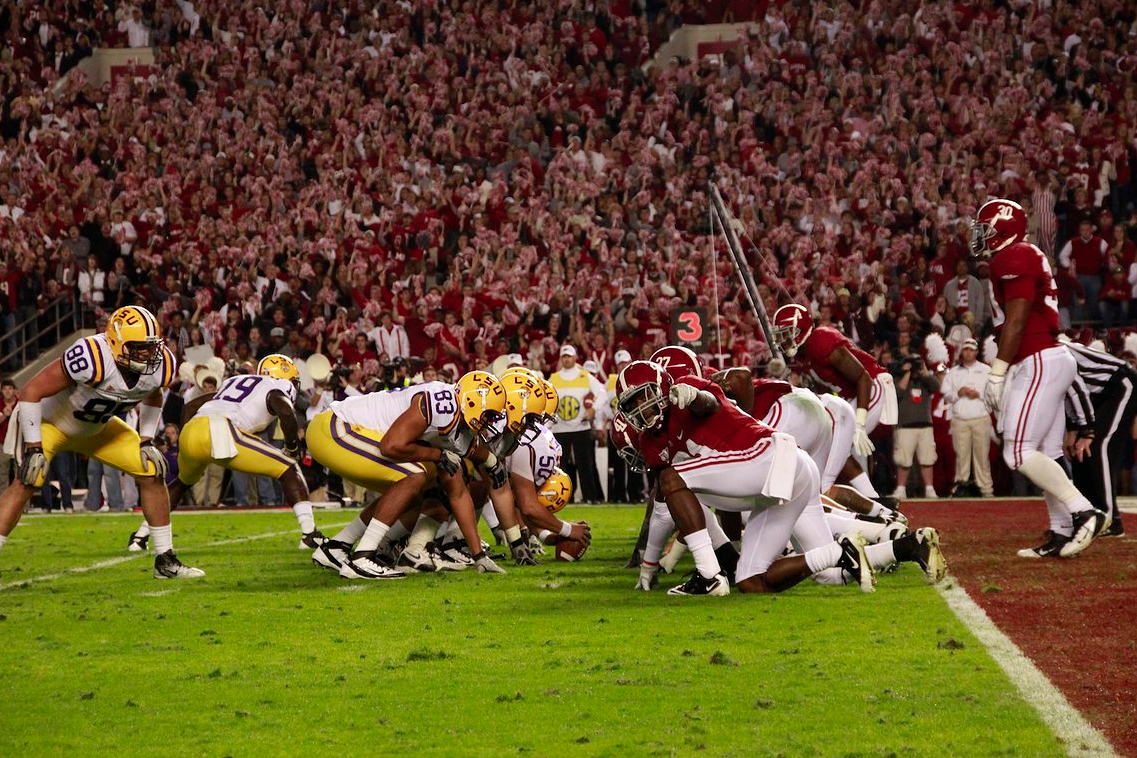
Alabama-LSU, 2011

In the 5th game of the 2010 season, undefeated No. 12 LSU trailed the Volunteers 14–10 with 0:04 left on the clock and the ball spotted on Tennessee's 2-yard line. On 3rd and goal, after a failed quarterback sneak attempt and with time disappearing off the clock, LSU attempted to send in several players for a substitution package. Seeing that the time was about to expire, center T-Bob Hebert snapped the ball before quarterback Jordan Jefferson was ready, the ball was fumbled, Jefferson was tackled, and the clock expired. On further review, Tennessee was penalized half the distance to the goalline for illegal participation. Amid the confusion in the waning seconds, Tennessee coaches sent 4 players onto the field when they saw LSU make a substitution. Only two players then left the field, leaving the Volunteers with 13 players lined up on defense. Due to the penalty, LSU got the ball back for a single untimed play on the 1-yard line. With the last play, running back Stevan Ridley received the toss sweep, charging forward, only to be hit near the line of scrimmage, but continued to drive forward through two Tennessee defenders and into the endzone for the game-winning score.

The ninth regulation game of the 2011 season for LSU found the No. 1 nationally ranked Tigers against the No. 2 Alabama Crimson Tide in a match called "The Game of the Century" or the "Matchup of the Year". Both teams were undefeated and both were also coming off a bye week; viewed as important to the BCS Championship game as the "inside track" by many of the sportswriters, the press built up the game in a Super Bowl-style atmosphere. Ultimately, the game came down to field position and a series of field goals as the top-ranked defense of both teams prevented any touchdowns. Alabama missed three field goals and a fourth was blocked during regulation, leading to a 6–6 tie heading into overtime. On the first possession of overtime, Alabama again missed a field goal from 52 yards out, only to watch LSU earn the win on the next possession with a chip-shot field goal. As a result, it was the second-lowest scoring matchup between No. 1 and No. 2 teams in the history of the NCAA, with a 9–6 decision. For the first time in BCS National Championship history, two SEC teams, the No. 1 LSU Tigers and the No. 2 Alabama Crimson Tide, again faced each other in the National Championship Game. Alabama won the game, 21–0. The SEC-only title game added impetus to the push for a national playoff system and hastened the death of the BCS system as implemented up to that time. Having lost three straight games after a 7–0 start into the season, rumors were floating that LSU would buy-out Miles' contract after the 2015 season. However, Miles was retained for the 2016 season. On September 25, 2016, LSU fired Miles and offensive coordinator Cam Cameron after an 18–13 loss to Auburn the previous day and a 2–2 start to begin the season.

=== Ed Orgeron era (2016–2021) ===
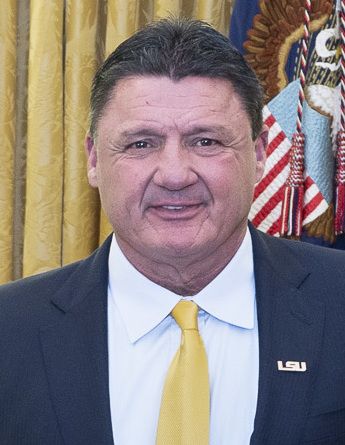
Ed Orgeron

After the firing of Les Miles, offensive line coach Ed Orgeron became LSU's interim head coach. Orgeron stated that he was going to "flip the script". He promoted tight ends coach Steve Ensminger to offensive coordinator and brought back Pete Jenkins to take over as defensive line coach. Orgeron also decided to shorten practices and spend more time in the film room in order to keep players fresh. In addition, he brought the "theme of daily practices" he modeled from coach Pete Carroll during Orgeron's first stint as an assistant at USC. These practice days have descriptive nicknames like Tell the Truth Monday, Competition Tuesday, Turnover Wednesday, No Repeat Thursday, and Focus Friday. Under Orgeron's watch, LSU finished out the season with a 6–2 record. Later in 2016, he was hired as the full-time head coach.

The beginning of the 2017 season saw Orgeron hire Matt Canada to be the offensive coordinator. Canada was known for an offensive playbook that was heavily based on setting skilled positions in motion prior to the snap, thus using jet sweeps often. The season began with LSU ranked in the top 15, but early losses to Mississippi State and Troy quickly found LSU unranked. However, the team went 7–2 in their remaining games, finishing the year with a 9–4 record. The 2018 season began with a season opening upset of 8th-ranked Miami, followed by another upset of 7th-ranked Auburn. These victories helped LSU rise to 5th in the CFP rankings, but a loss to 25th-ranked Florida sent LSU tumbling back to 13th. In response, the Tigers pulled off a shocking upset of No. 2 Georgia. The Tigers then avenged the previous year's loss to Mississippi State. The victories over Georgia and Mississippi State propelled LSU to being ranked No. 3 by the CFP going into a game against top-ranked Alabama. The LSU offense that had seemed to turn around after Steve Ensminger took over the duties of offensive coordinator was unable to score against Alabama's defense. After the loss to Alabama, LSU was able to defeat Arkansas and Rice before falling to Texas A&M in a 7-overtime game. With a 9–3 record, LSU was invited to the Fiesta Bowl to play the University of Central Florida, who had not lost a game in the previous two seasons. On New Years Day 2019, LSU gave UCF their first loss since 2016. LSU finished the 2018 season with a record of 10–3 and were ranked sixth in the nation by the AP poll and seventh by the Coaches poll. LSU was not predicted to have a good season in 2018, and some, including respected SEC commentator Paul Finebaum, believed it would be Orgeron's last.

After opening the season with a home win versus Georgia Southern, Orgeron's 2019 team recorded a statement road win over Texas in week two and proceeded to go undefeated through the regular season, including a 46–41 victory over Alabama at Bryant-Denny Stadium in Tuscaloosa. A win over Arkansas in the penultimate game of the regular season clinched the SEC West division title and secured a berth in the 2019 SEC Championship Game against Georgia. This was their first appearance in the SEC Championship Game since 2011. The traditionally defensive-minded Tigers averaged over 48 points per game, led by quarterback Joe Burrow, Baton Rouge-native running back Clyde Edwards-Helaire, and star receivers Ja'Marr Chase and Justin Jefferson. Burrow set new LSU and SEC single-season records for passing yards with 4,366; his 44 touchdown passes set a new LSU record and tied the SEC mark. Orgeron's Tigers defeated the Georgia Bulldogs in the SEC Championship Game to win their first SEC title since 2011. On Sunday, December 8, 2019, they were named the No. 1 seed in the College Football Playoff. They met the Big 12 Conference champion Oklahoma Sooners in the semifinals in the Peach Bowl, defeating them by a score of 63–28. Following the regular season, Orgeron was named the winner of the 2019 AP College Football Coach of the Year Award and Home Depot Coach of the Year Award. Joe Burrow won the 2019 Heisman Trophy. On January 13, 2020, Orgeron won his first national championship as a head coach with a win over the unbeaten defending national champion Clemson Tigers, 42–25, finishing the season 15–0. Orgeron and the LSU Tigers won the national title in their home state at the Mercedes-Benz Superdome in New Orleans.

LSU's 2020 season was shortened in response to the COVID-19 pandemic. They played a ten-game, all-SEC schedule. LSU started the season ranked No. 6 in the AP Poll, but dropped out of the rankings after three games and finished the season with a record of 5–5. The Tigers had three different starting quarterbacks throughout the course of the season. Myles Brennan started the first three games, but was injured during the game against Missouri on October 10 and was lost for the season. T. J. Finley started the next five games. Max Johnson started the final two games of the season. He led the Tigers to an upset win over the No. 6 Florida Gators in Gainesville and a shootout win over Ole Miss in the season finale. In March 2021, a woman testifying in front of Louisiana state legislators claimed that she had reported an instance of sexual harassment by LSU running back Derrius Guice to Orgeron, but that the coach had taken no action against him, and in fact called the woman and asked her to forgive Guice. Despite high expectations and a favorable schedule, LSU stumbled to a 3–3 start in 2021, losing several games in which they were favored. Following the tumultuous start, Orgeron’s Tigers were able to upend the No. 20-ranked Florida Gators in a thrilling rivalry game matchup. Despite the victory, LSU administrators announced the following day, on October 17, 2021, that they had reached a mutual agreement for Orgeron to leave the program at the end of the 2021 season. Orgeron's last game was a last-second victory against Texas A&M at home, which allowed the Tigers to finish the season at 6–6 and become bowl eligible. Despite this, Orgeron announced shortly after the game that he would not coach in the bowl game, and that offensive line coach Brad Davis would be appointed interim coach.

=== Brian Kelly era (2022–2025) ===
On November 30, 2021, Notre Dame head coach Brian Kelly was named the 34th head coach at LSU, replacing Ed Orgeron. Kelly cited "wanting to be with the best" and "the commitment to excellence, rich traditions, and unrivaled pride and passion of LSU Football" for the move. His signed contract also more than triples his previous salary, from his 2021 salary of $2.67 million to $9 million in 2022 with the total deal being worth $95 million over ten years excluding incentives.

== See also ==
- Louisiana State University traditions
- LSU Tigers and Lady Tigers
- LSU Tigers football statistical leaders
- List of LSU Tigers football seasons
- List of LSU Tigers head football coaches
- List of LSU Tigers in the NFL draft
