= List of LSU Tigers football seasons =

The following is a complete list of LSU Tigers football seasons through the 2021 season. LSU competes as part of the National Collegiate Athletic Association (NCAA) Division I Football Bowl Subdivision, representing the Louisiana State University in the Western Division of the Southeastern Conference (SEC). LSU plays their home games at Tiger Stadium in Baton Rouge, Louisiana.

The LSU Tigers claim four national championships, all of which were awarded by the AP or Coaches' wire-service polls, Bowl Championship Series or College Football Playoff. They were selected as National Champions on three additional occasions, though the program does not claim these titles. LSU has won 15 conference championships with 12 being Southeastern Conference championships. LSU has 812 official wins ranking it twelfth all-time for Division I FBS teams. The LSU Tigers first fielded a football team in 1893.

== Seasons ==
Year	Coach	Overall	Conference	Standing	Bowl/playoffs	Coaches^{#}	AP^{°}
Charles E. Coates (Independent) (1893)
1893	Charles E. Coates	0–1					
Albert Simmonds (Independent) (1894–1895)
1894	Albert Simmonds	2–1					
1895	Albert Simmonds	3–0					
Allen Jeardeau (SIAA) (1896–1897)
1896	Allen Jeardeau	6–0 (Note: Tulane having fielded an ineligible player in its victory over LSU. At the time that the game was declared forfeit, Tulane was leading with a score of 2–0. Due to the forfeiture, the official score was set at LSU 6, Tulane 0 by the game's referee. In addition to the forfeiture, Tulane was further sanctioned by the SIAA by being barred from fielding a team in intercollegiate play for the 1897 season.)	3–0	T–1st			
1897	Allen Jeardeau	1–1	0–0	N/A			
Edmond Chavanne (SIAA) (1898)
1898	Edmond Chavanne	1–0	1–0	T–2nd			
John P. Gregg (SIAA) (1899)
1899	John P. Gregg	1–4	1–2	13th			
Edmond Chavanne (SIAA) (1900)
1900	Edmond Chavanne	2–2	0–1	T–11th			
W. S. Borland (SIAA) (1901–1903)
1901	W. S. Borland	5–1 (Note: The season's edition of the Battle for the Rag against LSU was originally a 22–0 victory for Tulane. The Tigers protested the game to the Southern Intercollegiate Athletic Association (SIAA), and alleged that Tulane had used a professional player during the game. Several months later, the SIAA ruled the game an 11–0 forfeit in favor of LSU.)	2–1	T–3rd			
1902	W. S. Borland	6–1	4–1	T–1st (Note: Despite a single conference loss to Vanderbilt, the 1902 LSU team claimed an SIAA co-championship with undefeated Clemson.)			
1903	W. S. Borland	4–5	0–5	17th			
Dan A. Killian (SIAA) (1904–1906)
1904	Dan A. Killian	3–4	1–2	11th			
1905	Dan A. Killian	3–0	2–0	3rd			
1906	Dan A. Killian	2–2–2	0–2–1	8th			
Edgar Wingard (SIAA) (1907–1908)
1907	Edgar Wingard	7–3	3–1	3rd	W Bacardi		
1908	Edgar Wingard	10–0	2–0	T–1st			
Joe Pritchard (SIAA) (1909)
1909	Joe Pritchard (Note: John W. Mayhew, a former halfback at Brown, took over as coach for former Vanderbilt lineman Joe Pritchard midway through the season and coached the final three games.)	6–2	3–1	4th			
John W. Mayhew (SIAA) (1910)
1910	John W. Mayhew	1–5	1–3	10th			
James Dwyer (SIAA) (1911–1913)
1911	James Dwyer	6–3	2–1	T–5th			
1912	James Dwyer	4–3	2–3	T–13th			
1913	James Dwyer	6–1–2	1–1–2	T–7th			
E. T. MacDonnell (SIAA) (1914–1916)
1914	E. T. MacDonnell	4–4–1	1–2–1	12th			
1915	E. T. MacDonnell	6–2	4–0	3rd			
1916	E. T. MacDonnell (Note: MacDonnell coached the first five games of the season, Irving Pray coached games six and seven, and Dana X. Bible coached the final three games.)	7–1–2	3–1–1	T–4th			
Wayne Sutton (SIAA) (1917)
1917	Wayne Sutton	3–5	2–3	T–10th			
1918	No team						
Irving Pray (SIAA) (1919)
1919	Irving Pray	6–2	3–2	T–11th			
Branch Bocock (SIAA) (1920–1921)
1920	Branch Bocock	5–3–1	1–3	T–18th			
1921	Branch Bocock	6–1–1	2–1–1	T–9th			
Irving Pray (SIAA) (1922)
1922	Irving Pray	3–7	1–2	T–11th			
Mike Donahue (Southern Conference) (1923–1927)
1923	Mike Donahue	3–5–1	0–3	18th			
1924	Mike Donahue	5–4	0–3	T–19th			
1925	Mike Donahue	5–3–1	0–2–1	18th			
1926	Mike Donahue	6–3	3–3	T–10th			
1927	Mike Donahue	4–4–1	2–3–1	11th			
Russ Cohen (Southern Conference) (1928–1931)
1928	Russ Cohen	6–2–1	3–1–1	6th			
1929	Russ Cohen	6–3	3–1	10th			
1930	Russ Cohen	6–4	2–3	16th			
1931	Russ Cohen	5–4	3–2	7th			
Biff Jones (Southern Conference) (1932)
1932	Biff Jones	6–3–1	3–0	T–1st			
Biff Jones (Southeastern Conference) (1933–1934)
1933	Biff Jones	7–0–3	3–2	2nd			
1934	Biff Jones	7–2–2	4–2	4th			
Bernie Moore (Southeastern Conference) (1935–1947)
1935	Bernie Moore	9–2	5–0	1st	L Sugar		
1936	Bernie Moore	9–1–1	6–0	1st	L Sugar		2
1937	Bernie Moore	9–2	5–1	2nd	L Sugar		8
1938	Bernie Moore	6–4	2–4	10th			
1939	Bernie Moore	4–5	1–5	10th			
1940	Bernie Moore	6–4	3–3	6th			
1941	Bernie Moore	4–4–2	2–2–2	7th			
1942	Bernie Moore	7–3	3–2	6th			
1943	Bernie Moore	6–3	2–2	2nd	W Orange		
1944	Bernie Moore	2–5–1	2–3–1	6th			
1945	Bernie Moore	7–2	5–2	3rd			15
1946	Bernie Moore	9–1–1	5–1	3rd	T Cotton		8
1947	Bernie Moore	5–3–1	2–3–1	T–7th			
Gaynell Tinsley (Southeastern Conference) (1948–1954)
1948	Gaynell Tinsley	3–7	1–5	T–10th			
1949	Gaynell Tinsley	8–3	4–2	5th	L Sugar		9
1950	Gaynell Tinsley	4–5–2	2–3–2	9th			
1951	Gaynell Tinsley	7–3–1	4–2–1	T–3rd			
1952	Gaynell Tinsley	3–7	2–5	10th			
1953	Gaynell Tinsley	5–3–3	2–3–3	8th			
1954	Gaynell Tinsley	5–6	2–5	9th			
Paul Dietzel (Southeastern Conference) (1955–1961)
1955	Paul Dietzel	3–5–2	2–3–1	9th			
1956	Paul Dietzel	3–7	1–5	11th			
1957	Paul Dietzel	5–5	4–4	7th			
1958	Paul Dietzel	11–0	6–0	1st	W Sugar	1	1
1959	Paul Dietzel	9–2	5–1	T–2nd	L Sugar	3	3
1960	Paul Dietzel	5–4–1	2–3–1	8th			
1961	Paul Dietzel	10–1	6–0	T–1st	W Orange	3	4
Charles McClendon (Southeastern Conference) (1962–1979)
1962	Charles McClendon	9–1–1	5–1	3rd	W Cotton	8	7
1963	Charles McClendon	7–4	4–2	5th	L Bluebonnet		
1964	Charles McClendon	8–2–1	4–2–1	5th	W Sugar	7	7
1965	Charles McClendon	8–3	3–3	T–6th	W Cotton	14	8
1966	Charles McClendon	5–4–1	3–3	6th			
1967	Charles McClendon	7–3–1	3–2–1	6th	W Sugar		
1968	Charles McClendon	8–3	4–2	T–3rd	W Peach		19
1969	Charles McClendon	9–1	4–1	2nd		7	10
1970	Charles McClendon	9–3	5–0	1st	L Orange	6	7
1971	Charles McClendon	9–3	3–2	6th	W Sun	10	11
1972	Charles McClendon	9–2–1	4–1–1	3rd	L Astro-Bluebonnet	10	11
1973	Charles McClendon	9–3	5–1	2nd	L Orange	14	13
1974	Charles McClendon	5–5–1	2–4	9th			
1975	Charles McClendon	5–6	2–4	T–6th			
1976	Charles McClendon	7–3–1	3–3	T–7th			
1977	Charles McClendon	8–4	4–2	T–3rd	L Sun		
1978	Charles McClendon	8–4	3–3	T–4th	L Liberty		
1979	Charles McClendon	7–5	4–2	T–3rd	W Tangerine		
Jerry Stovall (Southeastern Conference) (1980–1983)
1980	Jerry Stovall	7–4	4–2	T–4th			
1981	Jerry Stovall	3–7–1	1–4–1	8th			
1982	Jerry Stovall	8–3–1	4–1–1	2nd	L Orange	11	11
1983	Jerry Stovall	4–7	0–6	T–9th			
Bill Arnsparger (Southeastern Conference) (1984–1986)
1984	Bill Arnsparger	8–3–1	4–1–1	2nd (Note: Florida was assessed a postseason ban following an NCAA investigation, and the SEC subsequently vacated any championship. The Sugar Bowl automatic bid for the conference champion was awarded to LSU. Under modern rules, LSU would be credited with the conference championship.)	L Sugar	16	15
1985	Bill Arnsparger	9–2–1	4–1–1	T–2nd	L Liberty	20	20
1986	Bill Arnsparger	9–3	5–1	1st	L Sugar	11	10
Mike Archer (Southeastern Conference) (1987–1990)
1987	Mike Archer	10–1–1	5–1	2nd	W Gator	5	5
1988	Mike Archer	8–4	6–1	T–1st	L Hall of Fame		19
1989	Mike Archer	4–7	2–5	T–7th			
1990	Mike Archer	5–6	2–5	T–7th			
Curley Hallman (Southeastern Conference) (1991–1994)
1991	Curley Hallman	5–6	3–4	T–6th			
1992	Curley Hallman	2–9	1–7	6th (Western)			
1993	Curley Hallman	5–6	3–5	T–4th (Western)			
1994	Curley Hallman	4–7	3–5	4th (Western)			
Gerry DiNardo (Southeastern Conference) (1995–1999)
1995	Gerry DiNardo	7–4–1	4–3–1	4th (Western)	W Independence	25	
1996	Gerry DiNardo	10–2	6–2	T–1st (Western)	W Peach	13	12
1997	Gerry DiNardo	9–3	6–2	T–1st (Western)	W Independence	13	13
1998	Gerry DiNardo	4–7	2–6	5th (Western)			
1999	Gerry DiNardo (Note: Gerry DiNardo served as LSU's head coach for the first ten games of the 1999 season before he was fired. Hal Hunter was appointed interim head coach for the final game of the season. LSU finished the year with an overall record of 3–8 and a mark of 1–7 in conference play.)	3–8	1–7	6th (Western)			
Nick Saban (Southeastern Conference) (2000–2004)
2000	Nick Saban	8–4	5–3	2nd (Western)	W Peach		22
2001	Nick Saban	10–3	5–3	T–1st (Western)	W Sugar^{†}	8	7
2002	Nick Saban	8–5	5–3	T–2nd (Western) (Note: In 2002, Alabama finished first in Western Division of the Southeastern Conference (SEC) with a conference record of 6–2, but was ineligible for the division title or postseason play as part of a penalty for National Collegiate Athletic Association (NCAA) violations. LSU, Arkansas, and Auburn tied for second place, each with a 5–3 mark in the conference, and were named co-champions. Arkansas was awarded a berth in the SEC Championship Game by virtue of their head-to-head wins over Auburn and LSU.)	L Cotton		
2003	Nick Saban	13–1	7–1	T–1st (Western)	W Sugar^{†}	1	2
2004	Nick Saban	9–3	6–2	2nd (Western)	L Capital One	16	16
Les Miles (Southeastern Conference) (2005–2016)
2005	Les Miles	11–2	7–1	T–1st (Western)	W Peach	5	6
2006	Les Miles	11–2	6–2	T–2nd (Western)	W Sugar^{†}	3	3
2007	Les Miles	12–2	6–2	1st (Western)	W BCS NCG^{†}	1	1
2008	Les Miles	8–5	3–5	3rd (Western)	W Chick-fil-A		
2009	Les Miles	9–4	5–3	2nd (Western)	L Capital One	17	17
2010	Les Miles	11–2	6–2	T–2nd (Western)	W Cotton	8	8
2011	Les Miles	13–1	8–0	1st (Western)	L BCS NCG^{†}	2	2
2012	Les Miles	(10-3) 0–3 (Note: LSU vacated all 37 wins from the 2012-15 seasons due to NCAA punishment for an ineligible player.)	(6-2) 0–2	T–2nd (Western)	L Chick-fil-A	12	13
2013	Les Miles	(10-3) 0–3	(5-3) 0–3	3rd (Western)	W Outback	14	14
2014	Les Miles	(8-5) 0–5	(4-4) 0–4	T–4th (Western)	L Music City		
2015	Les Miles	(10-3) 0–3	(5-3) 0–3	T–3rd (Western)	W Texas	17	16
2016	Les Miles (Note: Miles was fired after the first four games of the 2016 season. Ed Orgeron served as interim head coach for the remainder of the regular season and was promoted to head coach on a permanent basis on November 26. LSU finished the year with an overall record of 8–4 and a mark of 5–3 in conference play.)	8–4	5–3	T–2nd (Western)	W Citrus	14	13
Ed Orgeron (Southeastern Conference) (2016–2021)
2017	Ed Orgeron	9–4	6–2	3rd (Western)	L Citrus	18	18
2018	Ed Orgeron	10–3	5–3	T–2nd (Western)	W Fiesta^{†}	7	6
2019	Ed Orgeron	15–0	8–0	1st (Western)	W Peach^{†} (CFP Semifinal); W CFP NCG^{†}	1	1
2020	Ed Orgeron	5–5	5–5	4th (Western)	Ineligible (Note: On December 9, LSU announced a self-imposed bowl ban for the 2020 season. Although the Tigers did not finish the season with six wins, the NCAA removed bowl eligibility requirements for the 2020 bowl season. This self-imposed bowl ban was enacted due to an NCAA investigation at LSU over allegations of improper booster payments to their players.)		
2021	Ed Orgeron (Note: They were led by sixth-year head coach Ed Orgeron, who left the program at the conclusion of the regular season. The Tigers ended their season by playing Kansas State in the Texas Bowl, where they were led by interim head coach Brad Davis.)	6–7	3–5	T–6th (Western)	L Texas		
Brian Kelly (Southeastern Conference) (2022–2025)
2022	Brian Kelly	10–4	6–2	T–1st (Western)	W Citrus	15	16
2023	Brian Kelly	10–3	6–2	T–2nd (Western)	W ReliaQuest	13	13
2024	Brian Kelly	9–4	5–3	T–4th	W Texas		
Total:		838–435–47					
National championship Conference title Conference division title or championship game berth
^{†}Indicates Bowl Coalition, Bowl Alliance, BCS, or CFP / New Years' Six bowl.; ^{#}Rankings from final Coaches Poll.; ^{°}Rankings from final AP Poll.
