= List of LSU Tigers head football coaches =

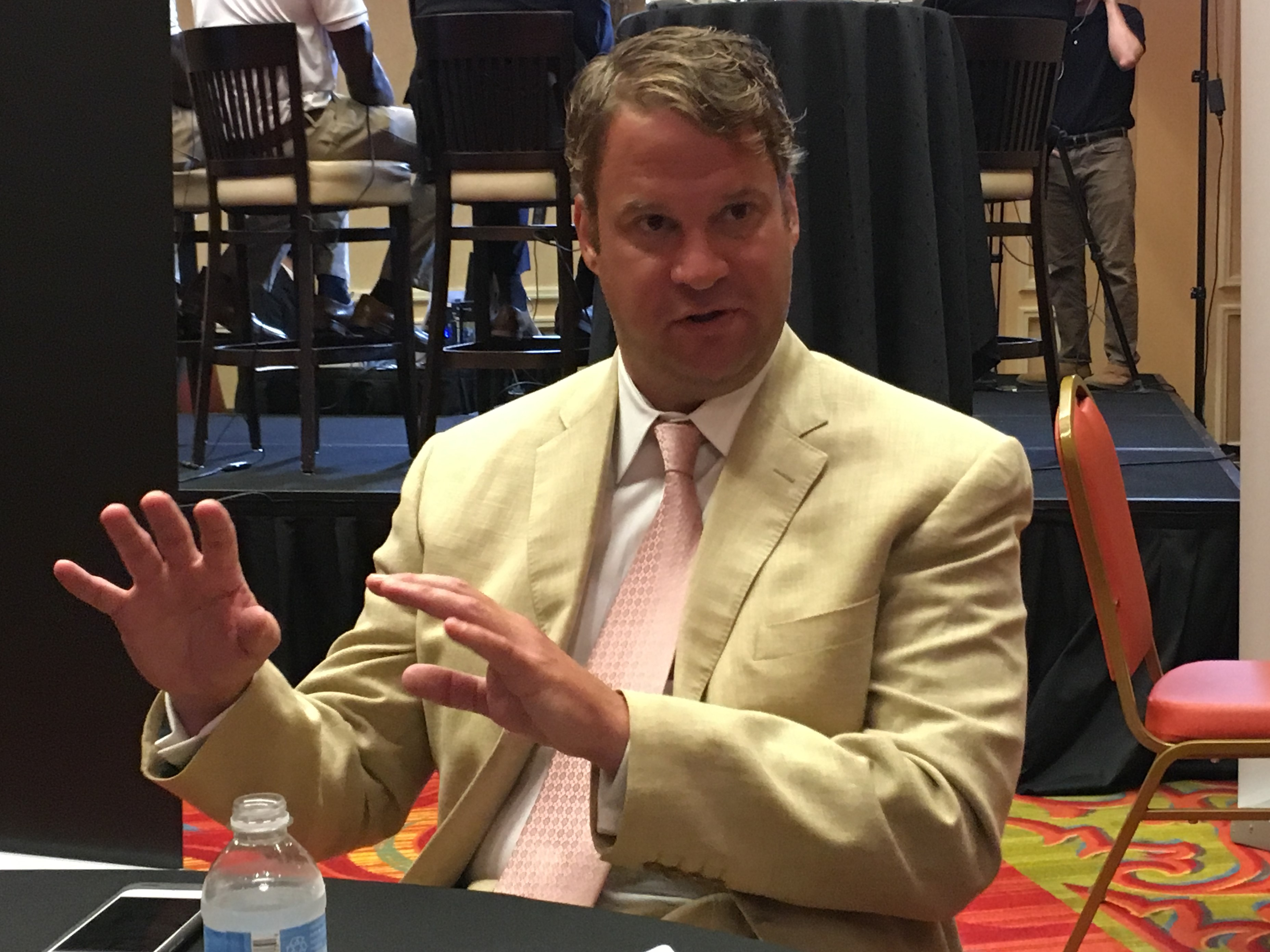
2026– head coach, Lane Kiffin

The LSU Tigers college football team represents Louisiana State University (LSU) in the West Division of the Southeastern Conference (SEC). The Tigers compete as part of the NCAA Division I Football Bowl Subdivision. The program has had 32 head coaches since it began play during the 1893 season. From November 2021 to October 2025, Brian Kelly served as LSU's head coach.

The team has played more than 1,200 games over 124 seasons of LSU football. Twelve coaches have led the Tigers in postseason bowl games: Bernie Moore, Gus Tinsley, Paul Dietzel, Charlie McClendon, Jerry Stovall, Bill Arnsparger, Mike Archer, Gerry DiNardo, Nick Saban, Les Miles, Ed Orgeron, and Brian Kelly. In addition, an Edgar Wingard-coached team accepted an invitation to participate in the first Bacardi Bowl. Six of those coaches also won conference championships after LSU left the Southern Conference to join the SEC: Moore, Dietzel, McClendon, Arnsparger, Archer, Saban, Miles, and Orgeron won a combined twelve as a member of the SEC. During their tenures, Dietzel, Saban, Miles, and Orgeron each won national championships awarded by major selectors while with the Tigers.

McClendon is the leader in seasons coached and games won, with 137 victories during his 18 years with the program. Allen Jeardeau has the highest winning percentage of those who have coached more than one game, with .875. John P. Gregg and John W. Mayhew have the lowest winning percentage of those who have coached more than one game, with .333. Bo Rein was hired in 1979 as head coach, but died in a plane crash on January 10, 1980, without ever coaching a game at LSU. Of the 34 different head coaches who have led the Tigers, Dana X. Bible, Mike Donahue, Biff Jones, Moore, and Charlie McClendon have been inducted into the College Football Hall of Fame.

== Key ==
Key to symbols in coaches list
General		Overall		Conference		Postseason (Note: Although the first Rose Bowl Game was played in 1902, it has been continuously played since the 1916 game, and is recognized as the oldest bowl game by the NCAA. "—" indicates any season prior to 1916 when postseason games were not played.)	
No.	Order of coaches (Note: A running total of the number of head coaches, with coaches who served separate tenures being counted only once. Interim head coaches are represented with "Int" and are not counted in the running total. "—" indicates the team played but either without a coach or no coach is on record. "X" indicates an interim year without play.)	GC	Games coached	CW	Conference wins	PW	Postseason wins
DC	Division championships	OW	Overall wins	CL	Conference losses	PL	Postseason losses
CC	Conference championships	OL	Overall losses	CT	Conference ties	PT	Postseason ties
NC	National championships	OT	Overall ties (Note: Overtime rules in college football were introduced in 1996, making ties impossible in the period since.)	C%	Conference winning percentage		
†	Elected to the College Football Hall of Fame	O%	Overall winning percentage (Note: When computing the win–loss percentage, a tie counts as half a win and half a loss.)				

== Coaches ==
List of head football coaches showing season(s) coached, overall records, conference records, postseason records, championships and selected awards (Note: Statistics correct as of the end of the 2025 NCAA Division I FBS football season.)
No.	Name	Term (Note: LSU did not field a team for the 1918 season due to World War I.)	Season(s)	GC	OW	OL	OT	O%	CW	CL	CT	C%	PW	PL	PT	DC (Note: Divisional champions have advanced to the SEC Championship Game since the institution of divisional play beginning in the 1992 season. Since that time, LSU has competed as a member of the SEC West.)	CC	NC	Awards
1	Charles E. Coates	1893	1	1	0	1	0	.000	—	—	—	—	—	—	—	—	0	0	—
2	Albert Simmonds	1894–1895	2	2	5	1	0	0.833	—	—	—	—	—	—	—	—	0	0	—
3	Allen Jeardeau	1896–1897	2	8	7	1	0	0.875	3	0	0	1.000	—	—	—	—	1	0	—
4	Edmond Chavanne	1898, 1900	1, 1	5	3	2	0	0.600	1	1	0	0.500	—	—	—	—	0	0	—
5	John P. Gregg	1899	1	6	2	4	0	0.333	1	2	0	0.333	—	—	—	—	0	0	—
6	W. S. Borland	1901–1903	3	22	15	7	0	0.682	6	6	0	0.500	—	—	—	—	0	0	—
7	Dan A. Killian	1904–1906	3	16	8	6	2	0.563	3	3	1	0.500	—	—	—	—	0	0	—
8	Edgar Wingard	1907–1908	2	20	17	3	0	0.850	4	1	0	0.800	—	—	—	—	1	0	—
9	Joe Pritchard	1909	1	5	4	4	0	0.800	2	1	0	0.667	—	—	—	—	0	0	—
10	John W. Mayhew	1909–1910	2	9	3	6	0	0.333	1	3	0	0.250	—	—	—	—	0	0	—
11	Pat Dwyer	1911–1913	3	25	16	7	2	0.680	3	5	1	0.389	—	—	—	—	0	0	—
12	E. T. MacDonnell	1914–1916	3	22	14	7	1	0.659	3	3	1	0.500	—	—	—	—	0	0	—
13	Irving Pray	1916, 1919, 1922	1, 1, 1	20	11	9	0	0.550	4	4	0	0.500	0	0	0	—	0	0	—
14	Dana X. Bible^{†}	1916	1	3	1	0	2	0.667	1	0	1	0.750	0	0	0	—	0	0	—
15	Wayne Sutton	1917	1	8	3	5	0	0.375	1	3	0	0.250	0	0	0	—	0	0	—
16	Branch Bocock	1920–1921	2	17	11	4	2	0.706	2	4	1	0.357	0	0	0	—	0	0	—
17	Mike Donahue^{†}	1923–1927	5	45	23	19	3	0.544	5	14	2	0.286	0	0	0	—	0	0	—
18	Russ Cohen	1928–1931	4	37	23	13	1	0.635	11	9	1	0.548	0	0	0	—	0	0	—
19	Biff Jones^{†}	1932–1934	3	31	20	5	6	0.741	11	2	2	0.800	0	0	0	—	1	0	—
20	Bernie Moore^{†}	1935–1947	13	128	83	39	6	0.672	43	28	4	0.600	1	3	1	—	2	0	—
21	Gaynell Tinsley	1948–1954	7	75	35	34	6	0.507	17	25	6	0.417	0	1	0	—	0	0	SEC Coach of the Year (1949); AP SEC Coach of the Year (1949)
22	Paul Dietzel	1955–1961	7	73	46	24	3	0.651	26	16	2	0.614	2	1	0	—	2	1 – 1958	AFCA Coach of the Year (1958); SEC Coach of the Year (1958); AP SEC Coach of the Year (1958)
23	Charles McClendon^{†}	1962–1979	18	203	137	59	7	0.692	63	41	3	0.603	7	6	0	—	1	0	AFCA Coach of the Year (1970); SEC Coach of the Year (1969, 1970); AP SEC Coach of the Year (1969); UPI SEC Coach of the Year (1969, 1970)
24	Bo Rein (Note: Bo Rein was hired in November 1979, but was killed in a plane crash on January 10, 1980, without coaching an official game at LSU.)	1980	1	—	—	—	—	—	—	—	—	—	—	—	—	—	—	—	—
25	Jerry Stovall	1980–1983	4	45	22	21	2	0.511	9	13	2	0.417	0	1	0	—	0	0	Walter Camp Coach of the Year Award (1982)
26	Bill Arnsparger	1984–1986	3	36	26	8	2	0.750	13	3	2	0.778	0	3	0	—	1	0	SEC Coach of the Year (1984, 1986); AP SEC Coach of the Year (1986)
27	Mike Archer	1987–1990	4	46	27	18	1	0.598	15	12	0	0.556	1	1	0	—	1	0	—
28	Curley Hallman	1991–1994	4	44	16	28	0	0.364	10	21	0	0.323	0	0	0	0	0	0	—
29	Gerry DiNardo	1995–1999	5	57	32	24	1	0.570	17	20	1	0.461	3	0	0	2	0	0	—
Int	Hal Hunter (Note: Hal Hunter was named interim head coach for the final game of the 1999 season, following the termination of Gerry DiNardo as head coach.)	1999	1	1	1	0	—	1.000	1	0	—	1.000	0	0	—	0	0	0	—
30	Nick Saban	2000–2004	5	64	48	16	—	0.750	28	12	—	0.700	3	2	—	3	2	1 – 2003	AP Coach of the Year (2003); Eddie Robinson Coach of the Year (2003); Paul "Bear" Bryant Award (2003); AP SEC Coach of the Year (2003)
31	Les Miles	2005–2016	12	148	114	34	—	0.770	62	28	—	0.689	7	4	—	3	2	1 – 2007	AP Coach of the Year (2011); SEC Coach of the Year (2011); Home Depot Coach of the Year Award (2011)
32	Ed Orgeron	2016–2021	6	71	51	20	0	0.738	29	14	0	0.674	4	1	0	1	1	1 – 2019	Associated Press Coach of the Year (2019); Home Depot Coach of the Year (2019); Eddie Robinson Coach of the Year Award (2019); George Munger Award (2019); Paul “Bear” Bryant Award (2019); SEC Coach of the Year (2019)
Int	Brad Davis	2021	1	1	0	1	0	.000	0	0	0	-	0	1	0	0	0	0	
33	Brian Kelly	2022–2025	4	42	31	11	—	0.738	17	7	—	0.708	3	0	—	1	0	0	
Int	Frank Wilson	2025	1	5	2	3	—	0.400	1	2	—	0.333	0	1	—	0	0	0	
34	Lane Kiffin	2026–present	1	0	0	0	—	–	0	0	—	–	0	0	—	0	0	0	
