= Alabama–LSU football rivalry =

American college football rivalry

- Alabama Crimson Tide LSU Tigers
- First meeting: November 18, 1895; LSU, 12–6
- Latest meeting: November 7, 2026; Alabama, 31–13
- Next meeting: 2028

Statistics
- Total meetings: 91
- All-time series: Alabama leads, 59–27–5
- Largest victory: Alabama, 47–3 (1922)
- Longest win streak: Alabama, 11 (1971–1981)
- Current win streak: Alabama, 4 (2023–present)

The Alabama–LSU football rivalry, also known as the "First Saturday in November" and the "Saban Bowl" (as both schools's football teams had Nick Saban as head coach), is an American college football rivalry between the Alabama Crimson Tide football team of the University of Alabama and the LSU Tigers football team of Louisiana State University. Both schools are charter members of the Southeastern Conference (SEC), and both universities' sports teams competed in the SEC's West Division when the conference was split into two divisions from 1992 to 2023.

== Series history ==
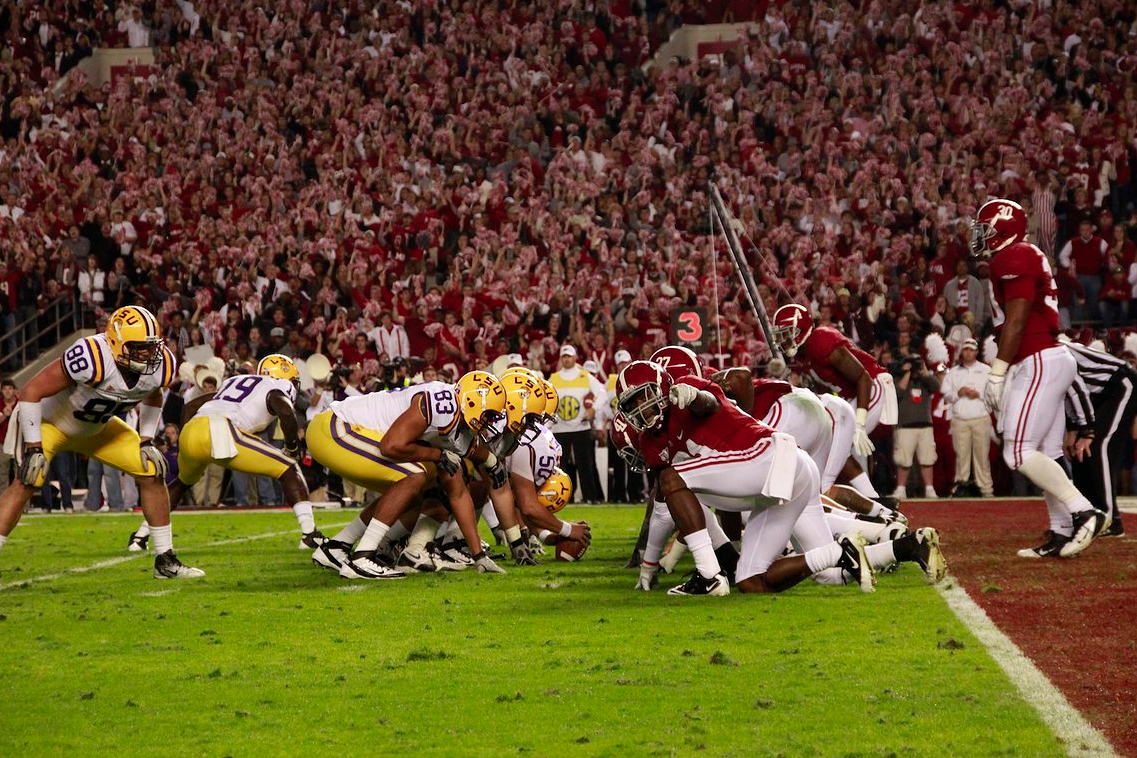
Sideline picture of Alabama vs LSU on November 5, 2011

The series started in 1895, with a 12–6 win for LSU in Baton Rouge, Louisiana. The rivalry has been played in Baton Rouge; New Orleans, Louisiana; Birmingham, Alabama; Montgomery, Alabama; Tuscaloosa, Alabama; and Mobile, Alabama.

The teams began playing each other on an annual basis in 1964, (and the series is uninterrupted since then), with Alabama playing its home games at Legion Field in Birmingham (except 1980) and LSU playing its home games on campus at Tiger Stadium. The series has been marked by long stretches where the home team has struggled. Alabama is 30–10–2 against LSU in Baton Rouge; they went 16–1–1 from 1965 to 1998. Since 1981, Alabama has gone 9–12 in games played in Alabama while LSU has gone 5–18–1 in games played in Louisiana. There have been five overtime games in total: two in Tuscaloosa (2005, 2011) and three in Baton Rouge (2008, 2014, 2022). Throughout the series, only 42% of games have been won by the team playing in its home state (excluding ties). In 1988, Alabama began playing its home game in the series on their Tuscaloosa campus at Bryant–Denny Stadium; LSU won the first game in the series after the move 19–18. Played without interruption now since 1964, the game alternates between the two respective campuses. From 1992–2025, contests in odd-numbered years were played in Tuscaloosa, and even-numbered years in Baton Rouge.

While Alabama controlled most of the series' early history by going 31–11–4 against LSU, the intensity and competitiveness has grown during the last four decades. Since Bear Bryant's retirement in 1982, Alabama leads the series 26–16–1. Four games in ten seasons (2005 to 2014) were decided in overtime. A 2009 poll of SEC fan bases found that over 60% of LSU fans singled out Alabama as their most bitter rival, while Alabama fans mostly did not consider it to be a rivalry, placing far more importance on the Iron Bowl vs. Auburn and the Third Saturday in October vs. Tennessee.

In 2007, the meeting was even more heated following Alabama's hiring of head coach Nick Saban, who had coached LSU to a National Championship; many media outlets dubbed the 2007 meeting the "Saban Bowl". Alabama won the series 13–5 in the games played during the "Saban Bowl" era.

In their 2011 regular season matchup, No. 1 LSU beat No. 2 Alabama 9–6 in overtime at Bryant–Denny Stadium in Tuscaloosa, on November 5. Later, during the 2011 post season, the two were selected by the Bowl Championship Series to play each other again in the 2012 BCS National Championship Game, which was the first time since 1986 that the two teams played in a location other than Baton Rouge or Tuscaloosa. Alabama, a controversial selection to the game (over Big 12 champion Oklahoma State) after failing to win the conference title (or division), proved its legitimacy and won the game 21–0. The rematch was the first (and only) BCS Championship Game to feature two teams from the same conference (as well as the same division), and was also the first shutout of any BCS bowl game in the BCS's 14-year history.

In 2012, #5 LSU and #1 Alabama met each other at Tiger Stadium on November 3, 2012. Alabama took a 14–3 lead into halftime, but LSU running back Jeremy Hill ran for a touchdown to cut the lead to 14–10. QB Zach Mettenberger threw a touchdown pass to wide receiver Jarvis Landry early in the 4th quarter for a 17–14 lead. LSU held twice on defense, but kicker Drew Alleman, the hero of the last year's game, missed a key field goal. Alabama then quickly drove downfield on completion by quarterback A. J. McCarron to wide receiver Kevin Norwood of 18, 15, and 11 yards to the LSU 28. On 2nd and 10, McCarron threw a screen pass to running back T.J. Yeldon, who weaved through LSU defenders for a game-winning touchdown with 51 seconds left. LSU failed to do anything, and Alabama won 21–17.

In 2014, the #16 Tigers met the #5 Crimson Tide at Tiger Stadium on November 8, 2014. Alabama clawed to a 10–7 lead in a defensive battle, but LSU tied at 10 entering the 4th quarter. With 50 seconds left and following a Yeldon fumble in which he was injured, LSU kicker Colby Delahoussaye kicked a 39-yard field goal for a 13–10 lead. Facing a second loss, and elimination from the first College Football Playoff, Alabama drove to the LSU 10, aided by a Delahoussaye kickoff that went out-of-bounds, which gave Alabama great field position at the 35 yard line. There, sophomore kicker Adam Griffith made a 27 yarder to send the game into overtime tied 13–13. On the first possession of overtime, Alabama QB Blake Sims found DeAndrew White in the end-zone for a 20–13 lead. LSU threw 4 straight incomplete passes, and Alabama escaped Baton Rouge with a 20–13 win.

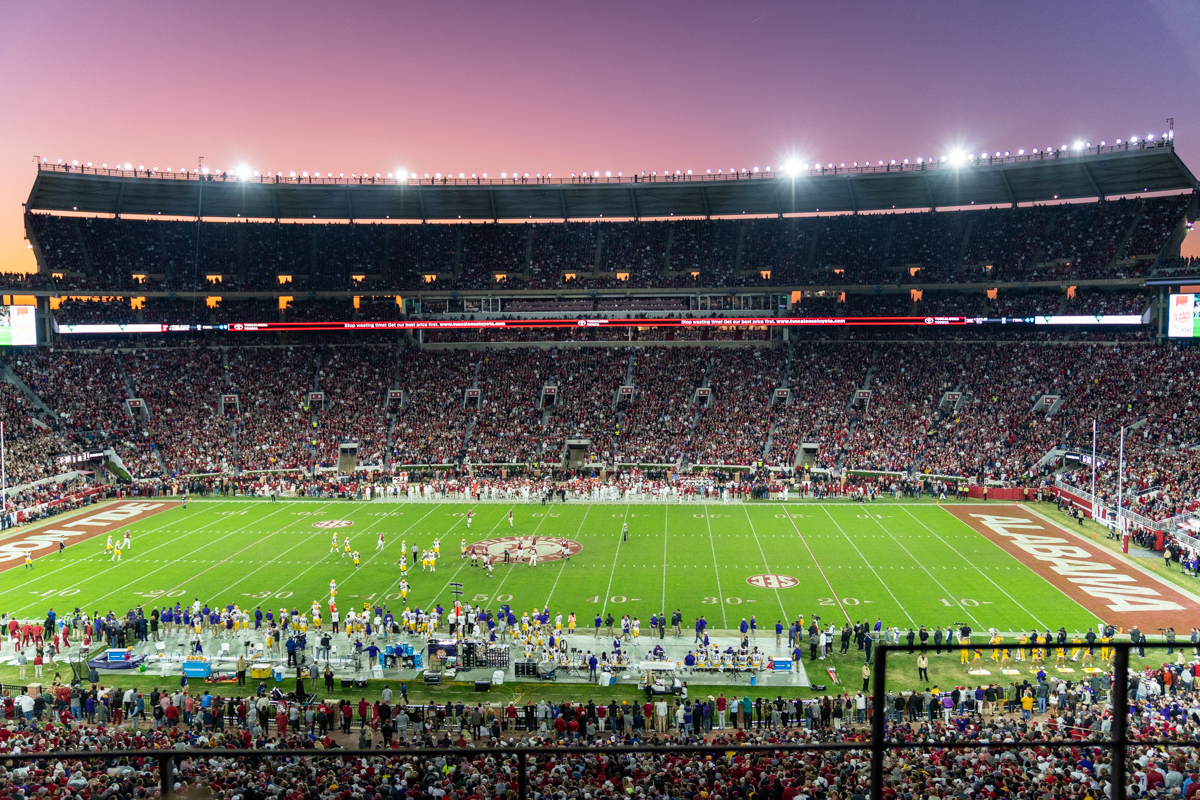
Spectator view of Alabama vs LSU on November 9, 2019

In 2019, the two teams met for their second Game of the Century of the decade as #1 LSU faced off against #2 Alabama. The game featured the top two NFL quarterback prospects and Heisman Trophy candidates at the time in Alabama's Tua Tagovailoa and LSU's Joe Burrow. Although the matchup was fairly even in the first quarter, the Tigers never trailed over the course of the game and outscored Alabama 23–6 in the second quarter to lead 33–13 at halftime. The Tide pulled within one score multiple times in the fourth quarter, but LSU's high scoring offense would prove to be too much for Alabama to overcome with the Tigers winning 46–41. The game snapped an eight-game losing streak in the series for LSU and virtually ensured both an SEC West title win and a College Football Playoff berth barring a total collapse. For Alabama, it set up the first time since the founding of the Playoff that they would not make an appearance, which they not would not miss again until 2022. The 46 points given up by the 'Bama defense was the most points scored in the Nick Saban era (later surpassed in the same season in the 2019 edition of the Iron Bowl) and the most given up by any Alabama team since October 25, 2003, against Tennessee. The game was the most viewed match-up of the 2019 regular season by over four million viewers, it also topped all conference championship games by a significant margin.

The series will be interrupted in 2027 and 2029 (unless the teams reach the SEC Championship Game and/or meet in the College Football Playoff) after the SEC did not pair the Crimson Tide and Tigers as yearly opponents from 2026–29 under the conference's nine-game schedule format. Mississippi State is replacing LSU as a yearly opponent for Alabama (joining Auburn and Tennessee), while LSU drew Arkansas, Ole Miss and Texas A&M as its yearly trio. The 2026 game is in Baton Rouge, followed by a 2028 meeting in Tuscaloosa.

== Game results ==
Alabama victories	LSU victories	Tie games

No.	Date	Location	Winning team		Losing team	
1	November 18, 1895	Baton Rouge, LA	LSU	12	Alabama	6
2	November 29, 1902	Tuscaloosa, AL	LSU	11	Alabama	0
3	November 9, 1903	Tuscaloosa, AL	Alabama	18	LSU	0
4	December 2, 1904	Baton Rouge, LA	Alabama	11	LSU	0
5	November 2, 1907	Mobile, AL	Alabama	6	LSU	4
6	November 25, 1909	Birmingham, AL	LSU	12	Alabama	6
7	November 15, 1919	Baton Rouge, LA	Alabama	23	LSU	7
8	November 11, 1920	Tuscaloosa, AL	Alabama	21	LSU	0
9	October 29, 1921	New Orleans, LA	Tie	7	Tie	7
10	November 10, 1922	Tuscaloosa, AL	Alabama	47	LSU	3
11	November 16, 1923	Montgomery, AL	Alabama	30	LSU	3
12	October 10, 1925	Baton Rouge, LA	Alabama	42	LSU	0
13	October 30, 1926	Tuscaloosa, AL	Alabama	24	LSU	0
14	October 8, 1927	Birmingham, AL	Tie	0	Tie	0
15	December 8, 1928	Birmingham, AL	Alabama	13	LSU	0
16	November 15, 1930	Montgomery, AL	Alabama	33	LSU	0
17	September 30, 1944	Baton Rouge, LA	Tie	27	Tie	27
18	October 6, 1945	Baton Rouge, LA	Alabama	26	LSU	7
19	November 9, 1946	Baton Rouge, LA	#19 LSU	31	Alabama	21
20	November 22, 1947	Tuscaloosa, AL	#8 Alabama	41	LSU	12
21	November 20, 1948	Baton Rouge, LA	LSU	26	Alabama	6
22	September 29, 1951	Mobile, AL	LSU	13	#9 Alabama	7
23	September 27, 1952	Baton Rouge, LA	Alabama	21	LSU	20
24	September 26, 1953	Mobile, AL	Tie	7	Tie	7
25	September 25, 1954	Baton Rouge, LA	Alabama	12	LSU	0
26	September 28, 1957	Baton Rouge, LA	LSU	28	Alabama	0
27	September 27, 1958	Mobile, AL	#15 LSU	13	Alabama	3
28	November 7, 1964	Birmingham, AL	#3 Alabama	17	#8 LSU	9
29	November 6, 1965	Baton Rouge, LA	#5 Alabama	31	LSU	7
30	November 5, 1966	Birmingham, AL	#4 Alabama	21	LSU	0
31	November 11, 1967	Baton Rouge, LA	Alabama	7	LSU	6
32	November 9, 1968	Birmingham, AL	Alabama	16	#20 LSU	7
33	November 8, 1969	Baton Rouge, LA	#12 LSU	20	Alabama	15
34	November 7, 1970	Birmingham, AL	#11 LSU	14	#19 Alabama	9
35	November 6, 1971	Baton Rouge, LA	#4 Alabama	14	#18 LSU	7
36	November 11, 1972	Birmingham, AL	#2 Alabama	35	#6 LSU	21
37	November 22, 1973	Baton Rouge, LA	#2 Alabama	21	#7 LSU	7
38	November 9, 1974	Birmingham, AL	#3 Alabama	30	LSU	0
39	November 9, 1975	Baton Rouge, LA	#5 Alabama	23	LSU	10
40	November 6, 1976	Birmingham, AL	#15 Alabama	28	LSU	17
41	November 5, 1977	Baton Rouge, LA	#2 Alabama	24	#18 LSU	3
42	November 11, 1978	Birmingham, AL	#3 Alabama	31	#10 LSU	10
43	November 10, 1979	Baton Rouge, LA	#1 Alabama	3	LSU	0
44	November 8, 1980	Tuscaloosa, AL	#6 Alabama	28	LSU	7
45	September 5, 1981	Baton Rouge, LA	#4 Alabama	24	LSU	7
46	November 6, 1982	Birmingham, AL	#11 LSU	20	#8 Alabama	10

No.	Date	Location	Winning team		Losing team	
47	November 5, 1983	Baton Rouge, LA	#19 Alabama	32	LSU	26
48	November 10, 1984	Birmingham, AL	#12 LSU	16	Alabama	14
49	November 9, 1985	Baton Rouge, LA	Tie	14	Tie	14
50	November 8, 1986	Birmingham, AL	#18 LSU	14	#6 Alabama	10
51	November 7, 1987	Baton Rouge, LA	#13 Alabama	22	#5 LSU	10
52	November 5, 1988	Tuscaloosa, AL	#13 LSU	19	#18 Alabama	18
53	November 11, 1989	Baton Rouge, LA	#4 Alabama	32	LSU	16
54	November 10, 1990	Tuscaloosa, AL	Alabama	24	LSU	3
55	November 9, 1991	Baton Rouge, LA	#8 Alabama	20	LSU	17
56	November 7, 1992	Baton Rouge, LA	#3 Alabama	31	LSU	11
57	November 6, 1993	Tuscaloosa, AL	LSU	17	#5 Alabama	13
58	November 5, 1994	Baton Rouge, LA	#6 Alabama	35	LSU	17
59	November 4, 1995	Tuscaloosa, AL	#16 Alabama	10	LSU	3
60	November 9, 1996	Baton Rouge, LA	#10 Alabama	26	#11 LSU	0
61	November 8, 1997	Tuscaloosa, AL	#14 LSU	27	Alabama	0
62	November 7, 1998	Baton Rouge, LA	Alabama	22	LSU	16
63	November 6, 1999	Tuscaloosa, AL	#12 Alabama	23	LSU	17
64	November 4, 2000	Baton Rouge, LA	LSU	30	Alabama	28
65	November 3, 2001	Tuscaloosa, AL	LSU	35	Alabama	21
66	November 16, 2002	Baton Rouge, LA	#10 Alabama	31	#14 LSU	0
67	November 15, 2003	Tuscaloosa, AL	#3 LSU	27	Alabama	3
68	November 13, 2004	Baton Rouge, LA	#17 LSU	26	Alabama	10
69	November 12, 2005	Tuscaloosa, AL	#5 LSU	16	#4 Alabama	13^{OT}
70	November 11, 2006	Baton Rouge, LA	#12 LSU	28	Alabama	14
71	November 3, 2007	Tuscaloosa, AL	#3 LSU	41	#17 Alabama	34
72	November 8, 2008	Baton Rouge, LA	#1 Alabama	27	#15 LSU	21^{OT}
73	November 7, 2009	Tuscaloosa, AL	#3 Alabama	24	#9 LSU	15
74	November 6, 2010	Baton Rouge, LA	#12 LSU	24	#5 Alabama	21
75	November 5, 2011	Tuscaloosa, AL	#1 LSU	9	#2 Alabama	6^{OT}
76	January 9, 2012	New Orleans, LA	#2 Alabama	21	#1 LSU	0
77	November 3, 2012	Baton Rouge, LA	#1 Alabama	21	#5 LSU	17
78	November 9, 2013	Tuscaloosa, AL	#1 Alabama	38	#10 LSU	17
79	November 8, 2014	Baton Rouge, LA	#5 Alabama	20	#16 LSU	13^{OT}
80	November 7, 2015	Tuscaloosa, AL	#4 Alabama	30	#2 LSU	16
81	November 5, 2016	Baton Rouge, LA	#1 Alabama	10	#13 LSU	0
82	November 4, 2017	Tuscaloosa, AL	#2 Alabama	24	#19 LSU	10
83	November 3, 2018	Baton Rouge, LA	#1 Alabama	29	#3 LSU	0
84	November 9, 2019	Tuscaloosa, AL	#2 LSU	46	#3 Alabama	41
85	December 5, 2020	Baton Rouge, LA	#1 Alabama	55	LSU	17
86	November 6, 2021	Tuscaloosa, AL	#2 Alabama	20	LSU	14
87	November 5, 2022	Baton Rouge, LA	#10 LSU	32	#6 Alabama	31^{OT}
88	November 4, 2023	Tuscaloosa, AL	#8 Alabama	42	#14 LSU	28
89	November 9, 2024	Baton Rouge, LA	#11 Alabama	42	#15 LSU	13
90	November 8, 2025	Tuscaloosa, AL	#4 Alabama	20	LSU	9
91	November 7, 2026	Baton Rouge, LA	#5 Alabama	31	#14 LSU	13
Series: Alabama leads 59–27–5

Series record sources: 2011 Alabama Football Media Guide, 2011 LSU Football Media Guide, and College Football Data Warehouse.

=== Results by location ===
State	City	Hosted	Alabama victories	LSU victories	Ties	Years played
Louisiana	Baton Rouge	43	31	10	2	1895, 1904, 1919, 1925, 1944–present
Louisiana	New Orleans	2	1	0	1	1921, 2012
Alabama	Tuscaloosa	25	15	10	0	1902–03, 1920–26, 1947, 1980, 1988–present
Alabama	Birmingham	14	8	5	1	1909, 1927–28, 1964–86
Alabama	Mobile	4	2	1	1	1907, 1951, 1953, 1958
Alabama	Montgomery	2	2	0	0	1923, 1930

=== Top-5 games ===
Since 1936, when the AP Poll began being released continuously, the Crimson Tide and Tigers have met 7 times when both have been ranked in the top 5. The first instance came in 2005, with the most recent in 2019. Alabama holds a 4–3 record in these top-5 meetings. The 2011 and 2011 NCG games were the only times the teams were the top two in the rankings.

Year	Away team		Home team		Notes
2005	No. 4 LSU	16	No. 1 Alabama	13	OT
2011	No. 1 LSU	9	No. 2 Alabama	6	OT
2012	No. 2 Alabama	21	No. 1 LSU	0	2011 NCG
2012	No. 1 Alabama	21	No. 5 LSU	17	Alabama won national championship
2015	No. 2 LSU	16	No. 4 Alabama	30	Alabama won national championship
2018	No. 1 Alabama	29	No. 3 LSU	0	
2019	No. 2 LSU	46	No. 3 Alabama	41	LSU won national championship

== Coaching records ==
=== Alabama ===
Head Coach	Games	Seasons	Wins	Losses	Ties	Win %
Kalen DeBoer	3	2024–present	3	0	0	1.000
Nick Saban	18	2007–2023	13	5	0	0.722
Mike Shula	4	2003–2006	0	4	0	0.000
Dennis Franchione	2	2001–2002	1	1	0	0.500
Mike DuBose	4	1997–2000	2	2	0	0.500
Gene Stallings	7	1990–1996	6	1	0	0.857
Bill Curry	3	1987–1989	2	1	0	0.666
Ray Perkins	4	1983–1986	1	2	1	0.375
Bear Bryant	20	1958–1982	16	4	0	0.800
Jennings B. Whitworth	1	1955–1957	0	1	0	0.000
Harold Drew	6	1947–1954	3	2	1	0.583
Frank Thomas	3	1931–1946	1	1	1	0.500
Wallace Wade	6	1923–1930	5	0	1	0.917
Xen Scott	4	1919–1922	3	0	1	0.875
J. W. H. Pollard	2	1906–1909	1	1	0	0.500
W. A. Blount	2	1903–1904	2	0	0	1.000
Eli Abbott	2	1893–1895, 1902	0	2	0	0.000

=== LSU ===
Head Coach	Games	Seasons	Wins	Losses	Ties	Win %
Lane Kiffin	1	2026-present	0	1	0	0.000
Frank Wilson	1	2025	0	1	0	0.000
Brian Kelly	3	2022–2024	1	2	0	0.333
Ed Orgeron	6	2016–2021	1	5	0	0.167
Les Miles	12	2005–2015	5	7	0	0.417
Nick Saban	5	2000–2004	4	1	0	0.800
Gerry DiNardo	5	1995–1999	1	4	0	0.200
Curley Hallman	4	1991–1994	1	3	0	0.250
Mike Archer	4	1987–1990	1	3	0	0.250
Bill Arnsparger	3	1984–1986	2	0	1	0.833
Jerry Stovall	4	1980–1983	1	3	0	0.250
Charles McClendon	16	1962–1979	2	14	0	0.125
Paul Dietzel	2	1955–1961	2	0	0	1.000
Gaynell Tinsley	5	1948–1954	2	2	1	0.500
Bernie Moore	4	1935–1947	1	2	1	0.375
Russ Cohen	2	1928–1931	0	2	0	0.000
Mike Donahue	4	1923–1927	0	3	1	0.125
Branch Bocock	2	1920–1921	0	1	1	0.250
Irving Pray	2	1916, 1919, 1922	0	2	0	0.000
Joe Pritchard	1	1909	1	0	0	1.000
Edgar Wingard	1	1907–1908	0	1	0	0.000
W.S. Borland	2	1901–1903	1	1	0	0.500
Albert Simmonds	1	1894–1895	1	0	0	1.000

== See also ==
- List of NCAA college football rivalry games
