= Harry McDevitt =

American football and baseball coach

Biographical details
- Born: June 5, 1885; Boston, Massachusetts, U.S.
- Died: January 30, 1962 (aged 76); Boston, Massachusetts, U.S.

Playing career
- 1906: Dartmouth
- Position: Quarterback

Coaching career (HC unless noted)

Football
- 1907: Newton HS (MA)
- 1908–1911: Colby
- 1909: Newton HS (MA)
- 1912: Catholic University
- 1913–1914: Salem HS (MA)
- 1915: English HS (MA)
- 1917: Colgate
- 1921–1922: Salem HS (MA)
- 1923–1926: Boston College (backfield)

Baseball
- 1909: Colby

Harry Sullivan McDevitt (June 5, 1885 – January 30, 1962) was an American college football and baseball coach. He served as the head football coach at the Catholic University of America in 1912 and Colgate University in 1917. He coached baseball at Colby College. McDevitt played as a quarterback at Dartmouth College in 1906, where he also later served as an assistant football coach.

== Playing career ==
McDevitt was born on June 5, 1885, in Boston, and attended Brighton High School. He then went on to Dartmouth College, where he played baseball from 1905 to 1907 and as a reserve quarterback on the 1906 football team. He was also a member of the Theta Delta Chi fraternity and the College Glee Club. McDevitt graduated in 1907.

== Coaching ==
In 1907, McDevitt was hired as the head coach at Newton High School in Newton, Massachusetts. He coached football at Colby College in Waterville, Maine, from 1908 to 1911 and coached the school's baseball team in 1909. In November 1909, he returned to Newton High School to coach the remainder of the football season after head coach Wendell P. Holman resigned.

In 1912, McDevitt served as the head coach at the Catholic University of America and compiled a 3–5 record. The following year, he returned to Massachusetts as the coach at Salem High School, where he was charged with rebuilding the team. In 1915, McDevitt coach English High School in Lynn, Massachusetts. In September 1917, Colgate University hired McDevitt as its 18th head football coach to replace E.C. Huntington who had joined the U.S. Army. He held that post for one season and amassed a 4–2 record.

In 1921 and 1922, McDevitt again coached football at Salem High School. In 1923 he became an assistant coach under Frank Cavanaugh at Boston College.

== Later life ==
During the 1920s, McDevitt owned a The Chateau, a dance club on Huntington Avenue in Boston. He retired from coaching after the 1926 season and became a furniture salesman for the Rapids Furniture Co. He never married and spent his later years living with his brother and sister in Allston. He died on January 30, 1962, at the Veterans Hospital in Boston. He was buried in Holyhood Cemetery.
