= E. T. MacDonnell =

American sports coach (1886–1956)

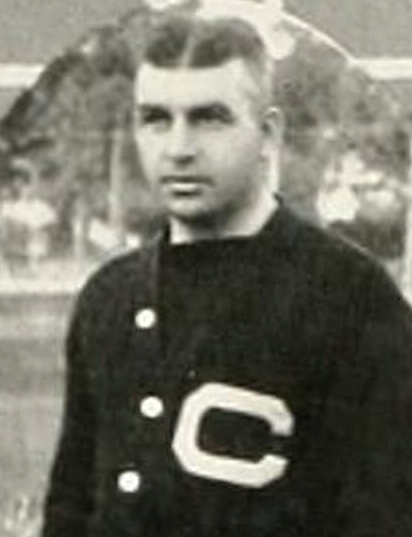
- MacDonnell pictured in The Howler 1918, Wake Forest yearbook

Biographical details
- Born: August 9, 1886; Hamilton, New York, U.S.
- Died: March 30, 1956 (aged 69); McColl, South Carolina, U.S.

Playing career

Football
- 1906–1909: Colgate
- Position: End

Coaching career (HC unless noted)

Football
- c. 1910: Jefferson (LA)
- 1914–1916: LSU
- 1917: Wake Forest

Basketball
- 1917–1918: Wake Forest

Baseball
- 1918: Wake Forest

Head coaching record
- Overall: 4–12 (basketball); 9–3 (baseball)

Edward Thomas MacDonnell (August 9, 1886 – March 30, 1956) was an American college football, college basketball, and college baseball coach. He served as the head football coach at Jefferson College in Convent, Louisiana during the early 1910s, Louisiana State University (LSU) from 1914 to 1916, and Wake Forest University for one season, in 1917. MacDonnell was also the head basketball coach at Wake Forest for the 1917–18 season, tallying a mark of 4–12, and the school's head baseball coach in the spring of 1918, notching a record of 9–3.

A native of Hamilton, New York, MacDonald attended Colgate University, where he was captain of the 1909 Colgate football team. He was a member of Phi Gamma Delta. After graduating from Colgate in 1910, MacDonnell began his coaching career at Jefferson College.

MacDonnell later worked as a steel company executive. He was the superintendent of Republic Steel's plant in Warren, Ohio, and later ran the company's excess products division in Youngstown, Ohio until retiring in 1955. MacDonnell died of a heart attack, on March 30, 1956, while vacationing in McColl, South Carolina.

== Head coaching record ==
=== Football ===
Year	Team	Overall	Conference	Standing	Bowl/playoffs
LSU Tigers (Southern Intercollegiate Athletic Association) (1914–1916)
1914	LSU	4–4–1	0–1–1		
1915	LSU	6–2	3–1		
1916	LSU	4–1*	0–1*		
LSU:		14–7–1	3–3–1	*Last five games of season were coached by Irving Pray and Dana X. Bible.	
Wake Forest Baptists (Independent) (1917)
1917	Wake Forest	1–6–1			
Wake Forest:		1–6–1			
Total:					
