= Dana X. Bible =

American sports coach, athletics administrator (1891–1980)

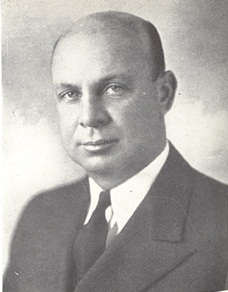
- Bible from the 1935 Cornhusker

Biographical details
- Born: October 8, 1891; Jefferson City, Tennessee, U.S.
- Died: January 19, 1980 (aged 88); Austin, Texas, U.S.

Playing career

Football
- 1910s: Carson–Newman

Coaching career (HC unless noted)

Football
- 1913–1915: Mississippi College
- 1916: LSU
- 1917: Texas A&M
- 1919–1928: Texas A&M
- 1929–1936: Nebraska
- 1937–1946: Texas

Basketball
- 1920–1927: Texas A&M

Baseball
- 1920–1921: Texas A&M

Administrative career (AD unless noted)
- 1932–1936: Nebraska
- 1937–1956: Texas

Head coaching record
- Overall: 198–72–23 (football); 90–47 (basketball); 29–10–1 (baseball)
- Bowls: 3–0–1

Accomplishments and honors

Championships
- Football; 2 national (1919, 1927); 8 SWC (1917, 1919, 1921, 1925, 1927, 1942–1943, 1945); 6 Big Six (1929, 1931–1933, 1935–1936)

Awards
- Amos Alonzo Stagg Award (1954)
- College Football Hall of Fame; Inducted in 1951 (profile)

Dana Xenophon Bible (October 8, 1891 – January 19, 1980) was an American football player, coach of football, basketball, and baseball, and college athletics administrator. He served as the head football coach at Mississippi College (1913–1915), Louisiana State University (1916), Texas A&M University (1917, 1919–1928), the University of Nebraska (1929–1936), and the University of Texas (1937–1946), compiling a career college football record of 198–72–23. Bible was also the head basketball coach at Texas A&M from 1920 to 1927 and the head baseball coach there from 1920 to 1921. In addition, he was the athletic director at Nebraska from 1932 to 1936 and at Texas from 1937 to 1956. Bible was inducted into the College Football Hall of Fame as a coach in 1951.

== Early life ==
Bible was born in Jefferson City, Tennessee. He graduated from Jefferson City High School in 1908 and received a B.A. degree from Carson–Newman College in 1912. Bible played football while in college and was a member of Delta Kappa Epsilon fraternity, Iota chapter.

== Career ==
Bible began his coaching career at Brandon Prep School in Shelbyville, Tennessee. Mississippi College recruited him to coach in 1912, and he was recruited to coach for Texas A&M University in 1916.

In his college football coaching career, Bible compiled a record of 198–72–23. His teams had winning records in thirty of the thirty-three seasons he coached. Bible twice won ten games in a season. Bible also coached baseball and basketball at Texas A&M. During his hiatus from Texas A&M in 1918, Bible served as a pilot in World War I.

Bible's 1917 Texas A&M Aggies football team was undefeated, untied, and did not surrender a single point all season, outscoring opponents 270–0. His 1919 Texas A&M Aggies football team repeated the feat, outscoring the opposition 275–0. The 1919 team was retroactively named a national champion by the Billingsley Report and the National Championship Foundation. Texas A&M football under Bible is the only college football program to hold all opponents scoreless in two separate seasons.

In ten seasons at University of Texas at Austin, Bible brought the Longhorns football program to national prominence, winning three Southwest Conference championships, making three appearances at the Cotton Bowl Classic—two victorious, and placing in the final AP poll rankings five times.

While at Texas, University of Chicago coach Clark Shaughnessy contacted Bible to organize a clinic on the T formation. Along with Frank Leahy of the University of Notre Dame, they helped create the T formation revolution. Bible was elected to the College Football Hall of Fame in 1951, the Texas Sports Hall of Fame in 1959, the Longhorn Hall of Honor in 1960, and the Texas A&M Athletic Hall of Fame in 1966. He was the 1954 recipient of the Amos Alonzo Stagg Award.

Bible served on the National Collegiate Football Rules Committee for 25 years, and was president of the American Football Coaches Association. His book, Championship Football, was published in 1947.

== Family ==
Bible was the son of Jonathan David Bible (October 9, 1863 in Cocke County, Tennessee – November 23, 1942) and Cleopatra I. Willis (October 19, 1870 – January 25, 1954). The couple married on June 20, 1889. Jonathan was a college professor at Carson–Newman College in Jefferson City, Tennessee; he could quote biblical scripture and was a Greek and Latin scholar.

Bible married Rowena Rhodes on December 19, 1923. They had two children, William and Barbara. Rowena died in 1942. Dana married Agnes Stacy in 1944, and they would later divorce in 1950. He married Dorothy Gilstrap on February 2, 1952.

== Death ==
Bible died on January 19, 1980, and is interred at Austin Memorial Park Cemetery in Austin, Texas.

== Head coaching record ==
=== Football ===
| Year | Team | Overall | Conference | Standing | Bowl/playoffs | AP^{#} |
|---|---|---|---|---|---|---|
Mississippi College Collegians (Southern Intercollegiate Athletic Association) (1913–1915)
| 1913 | Mississippi College | 6–3 | 1–2 | 11th | | |
| 1914 | Mississippi College | 4–3–1 | 0–1–1 | 14th | | |
| 1915 | Mississippi College | 3–3–1 | 2–3 | 15th | | |
| Mississippi College: | | 12–7–2 | 3–6–1 | | | |
LSU Tigers (Southern Intercollegiate Athletic Association) (1916)
| 1916 | LSU | 1–0–2* | 1–0–1* | 7th | | |
| LSU: | | 1–0–2 | 1–0–1 | *First 7 games coached were by E. T. MacDonnell and Irving Pray. | | |
Texas A&M Aggies (Southwest Conference) (1917)
| 1917 | Texas A&M | 8–0 | 3–0 | 1st | | |
Texas A&M Aggies (Southwest Conference) (1919–1928)
| 1919 | Texas A&M | 10–0 | 4–0 | 1st | | |
| 1920 | Texas A&M | 6–1–1 | 5–1 | 3rd | | |
| 1921 | Texas A&M | 6–1–2 | 3–0–2 | 1st | W Dixie Classic | |
| 1922 | Texas A&M | 5–4 | 2–2 | T–3rd | | |
| 1923 | Texas A&M | 5–3–1 | 0–3–1 | 8th | | |
| 1924 | Texas A&M | 7–2–1 | 2–2–1 | 4th | | |
| 1925 | Texas A&M | 7–1–1 | 4–1–0 | 1st | | |
| 1926 | Texas A&M | 5–3–1 | 1–3–1 | 6th | | |
| 1927 | Texas A&M | 8–0–1 | 4–0–1 | 1st | | |
| 1928 | Texas A&M | 5–4–1 | 1–3–1 | 5th | | |
| Texas A&M: | | 72–19–9 | 27–15–7 | | | |
Nebraska Cornhuskers (Big Six Conference) (1929–1936)
| 1929 | Nebraska | 4–1–3 | 3–0–2 | 1st | | |
| 1930 | Nebraska | 4–3–2 | 2–2–1 | 4th | | |
| 1931 | Nebraska | 8–2 | 5–0 | 1st | | |
| 1932 | Nebraska | 7–1–1 | 5–0 | 1st | | |
| 1933 | Nebraska | 8–1 | 5–0 | 1st | | |
| 1934 | Nebraska | 6–3 | 4–1 | 2nd | | |
| 1935 | Nebraska | 6–2–1 | 4–0–1 | 1st | | |
| 1936 | Nebraska | 7–2 | 5–0 | 1st | | 9 |
| Nebraska: | | 50–15–7 | 33–3–4 | | | |
Texas Longhorns (Southwest Conference) (1937–1946)
| 1937 | Texas | 2–6–1 | 1–5 | 7th | | |
| 1938 | Texas | 1–8 | 1–5 | T–6th | | |
| 1939 | Texas | 5–4 | 3–3 | 4th | | |
| 1940 | Texas | 8–2 | 4–2 | T–3rd | | |
| 1941 | Texas | 8–1–1 | 4–1–1 | 2nd | | 4 |
| 1942 | Texas | 9–2 | 5–1 | 1st | W Cotton | 11 |
| 1943 | Texas | 7–1–1 | 5–0 | 1st | T Cotton | 14 |
| 1944 | Texas | 5–4 | 3–2 | 2nd | | |
| 1945 | Texas | 10–1 | 5–1 | 1st | W Cotton | 10 |
| 1946 | Texas | 8–2 | 4–2 | 3rd | | 15 |
| Texas: | | 63–31–3 | 35–22–1 | | | |
| Total: | | 198–72–23 | | | | |
National championship Conference title Conference division title or championship game berth
^{#}Rankings from final AP Poll.
