= Wayne Sutton =

American football player and coach (1890–1976)

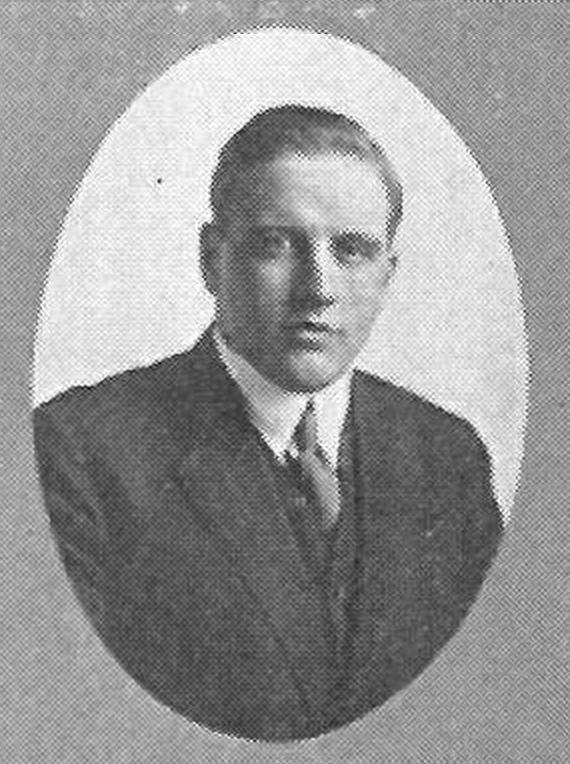
- Sutton pictured in the Tyee 1914, Washington yearbook

Biographical details
- Born: November 6, 1890; Montesano, Washington, U.S.
- Died: November 1976 (aged 85–86); Seattle, Washington, U.S.

Playing career
- 1910–1913: Washington

Coaching career (HC unless noted)
- 1914–1916: Washington (assistant)
- 1917: LSU
- 1923–1929: Washington (assistant)

Head coaching record
- Overall: 3–5

Wayne Campbell Sutton (November 6, 1890 – November 1976) was an American college football player and coach. He served as the head coach at Louisiana State University (LSU) for the 1917 season, compiling a record of 3–5. In 1946, Sutton was by appointed Monrad Wallgren, Governor of Washington, to the state's horse racing commission.

== Head coaching record ==
Year	Team	Overall	Conference	Standing	Bowl/playoffs
LSU Tigers (Southern Intercollegiate Athletic Association) (1917)
1917	LSU	3–5	2–3	T–10th	
LSU:		3–5	2–3		
Total:		3–5			
