= John W. Mayhew =

American football player and sports coach (1885–1941)

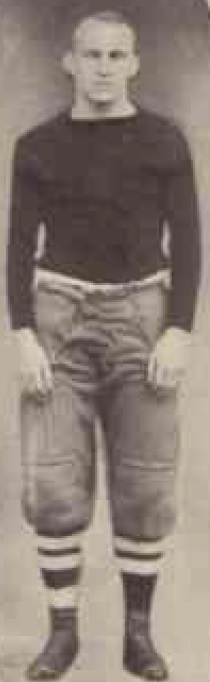

Biographical details
- Born: October 2, 1885; Chilmark, Massachusetts, U.S.
- Died: September 30, 1941 (aged 58); Pocasset, Massachusetts, U.S.

Playing career

Football
- 1906–1908: Brown
- Position: Halfback

Coaching career (HC unless noted)

Football
- 1909–1910: LSU

Basketball
- 1909–1911: LSU

Baseball
- 1910–1911: LSU

Track and field
- 1910–1911: LSU

Head coaching record
- Overall: 3–6 (football); 11–4 (basketball); 15–16 (baseball)

Accomplishments and honors

Awards
- Consensus All-American (1906); Second-team All-American (1908)

John Wesley Mayhew (October 2, 1885 – September 30, 1941) was an American football player and coach of football, basketball, and baseball coach. He played college football at Brown University from 1906 to 1908 and was named an All-American in 1906 playing as a halfback. He also played baseball and ran track at Brown. Mayhew served as the head football coach at Louisiana State University (LSU) from 1909 to 1910, compiling a record of 3–6. He took over for Joe Pritchard in the middle of the 1909 season. Mayhew was also the head coach of the LSU basketball team from 1909 to 1911, head coach of the LSU baseball team from 1910 to 1911 and head coach of the LSU track and field team.

Mayhew was born on October 2, 1885, in Chilmark, Massachusetts. He graduated from the Worcester Academy in 1904 and from Brown University in 1909. He on September 30, 1941, in Pocasset, Massachusetts .

== Head coaching record ==
=== Football ===
Year	Team	Overall	Conference	Standing	Bowl/playoffs
LSU Tigers (Southern Intercollegiate Athletic Association) (1909)
1909	LSU	2–1*	1–0*		
1910	LSU	1–5	1–3		
LSU:		3–6	2–3	*First 5 games were coached by Joe Pritchard.	
Total:		3–6			

=== Basketball ===
Record table
Season	Team	Overall	Conference	Standing	Postseason
LSU Tigers (Southern Intercollegiate Athletic Association) (1909–1911)
1909–10	LSU	3–1	2–0		
1910–11	LSU	8–3	6–1		
LSU:		11–4 (.733)	8–1 (.889)		
Total:		11–4 (.733)			

=== Baseball ===
Record table
Season	Team	Overall	Conference	Standing	Postseason
LSU Tigers (Southern Intercollegiate Athletic Association) (1910–1911)
1910	LSU	7–9			
1911	LSU	8–7			
LSU:		15–16 (.484)			
Total:		15–16 (.484)			
