= Irving Pray =

American football coach (1886–1948)

Biographical details
- Born: December 25, 1886; Natick, Massachusetts, U.S.
- Died: August 27, 1948 (aged 61); Alexandria, Louisiana, U.S.

Coaching career (HC unless noted)

Football
- 1911: Natick HS (MA)
- 1913–1914: Norwich
- 1915: Salem HS (MA)
- 1916: LSU
- 1919: LSU
- 1922: LSU

Baseball
- 1912: Natick HS (MA)

Head coaching record
- Overall: 11–20 (college football)

Irving Rudolph Pray (December 25, 1886 – August 27, 1948) was an American football coach. He served as the head football coach at Norwich University in Northfield, Vermont from 1913 to 1914 and Louisiana State University (LSU) for part of the 1916 season and for full seasons in 1919 and 1922, compiling a career college football coaching record of 11–20.

Pray was a graduate of the Massachusetts Institute of Technology. He was born in Natick, Massachusetts and died in Alexandria, Louisiana.

Pray was the head football coach at Natick High School, in hometown in 1911. In 1915, he appointed head football coach at Salem High School in Salem, Massachusetts, succeeding Harold McDevitt.

== Head coaching record ==
=== College football ===
Year	Team	Overall	Conference	Standing	Bowl/playoffs
Norwich Cadets (Independent) (1913–1914)
1913	Norwich	0–3			
1914	Norwich	0–8			
Norwich:		0–11			
LSU Tigers (Southern Intercollegiate Athletic Association) (1916)
1916	LSU	2–0*	1–0*		
LSU Tigers (Southern Intercollegiate Athletic Association) (1919)
1919	LSU	6–2	2–2		
LSU Tigers (Southern Conference) (1922)
1922	LSU	3–7	1–2	T–12th	
LSU:		11–9	4–4	*First 5 games of season were coached by E. T. MacDonnell and the last 3 by Dana X. Bible.	
Total:		11–20			

== See also ==
- List of college football head coaches with non-consecutive tenure
