= John P. Gregg =

American football player and coach (1876–1963)

Biographical details
- Born: September 14, 1876; Elm Grove, Wisconsin, U.S.
- Died: June 11, 1963 (aged 86); Independence, Iowa, U.S.

Playing career
- 1895–1897: Wisconsin
- Positions: Quarterback, halfback

Coaching career (HC unless noted)
- 1899: LSU

Head coaching record
- Overall: 2–4

John Parker Gregg (September 14, 1876 – June 11, 1963) was an American college football player and coach. He served as the head football coach at Louisiana State University (LSU) for one season in 1899, compiling a record of 2–4. Gregg graduated from high school in Madison, Wisconsin and was a graduate of the University of Wisconsin–Madison, where he lettered in football and baseball. Gregg was a halfback and a quarterback on the football team, and lettered in 1895 and 1897. During World War I he served as a captain in the Judge Advocate's Office.

Gregg was born on September 14, 1876, in Elm Grove, Wisconsin. He died on June 11, 1963, as a hospital in Independence, Iowa.

== Head coaching record ==
Year	Team	Overall	Conference	Standing
LSU Tigers (Southern Intercollegiate Athletic Association) (1899)
1899	LSU	2–4	1–2	
LSU:		2–4	1–2	
Total:		2–4		
