= Charles E. Coates =

American chemist and college football player and coach

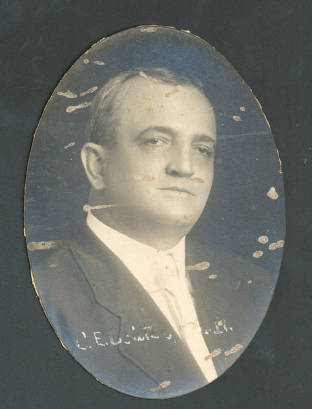

Biographical details
- Born: August 13, 1866; Baltimore, Maryland, U.S.
- Died: December 27, 1939 (aged 73); Baton Rouge, Louisiana, U.S.

Playing career
- 1880s: Johns Hopkins

Coaching career (HC unless noted)
- 1893: LSU

Head coaching record
- Overall: 0–1

Charles Edward Coates Jr. (August 13, 1866 – December 27, 1939) was an American academic, chemist, and college football player and coach. He was the third faculty member with a PhD in Louisiana State University's history. Coates was known worldwide for his work in sugar chemistry research and he served as the dean of the Audubon Sugar School. Coates was also the first head coach of the LSU Tigers football team. He lost the only game he ever coached in 1893 to a team composed mostly of ex-Tulane players and members of the Southern Athletic Club, 34–0.

Coates was born in Baltimore, Maryland in 1866. His father, Charles E. Coates Sr., practiced medicine in Baltimore after moving from Coatesville, Pennsylvania, which had been settled by and named for his ancestors. Coates played football at Johns Hopkins University and when he came to LSU in 1893, he volunteered to organize and coach the school's first football squad. He married Ollie Maurin of Donaldsonville, Louisiana in 1901. The couple had four children. Coates died in 1939.

The Charles E. Coates Memorial Fund at LSU is named after him, as is Coates Hall, a building on LSU's campus.

== Head coaching record ==
Year	Team	Overall	Conference	Standing	Bowl/playoffs
LSU (Independent) (1893)
1893	LSU	0–1			
LSU:		0–1			
Total:		0–1			
