= Joe Pritchard (American football) =

American football player and coach (1886–1947)

Biographical details
- Born: May 15, 1886; Sharon, Mississippi, U.S.
- Died: July 14, 1947 (aged 61); Sunflower County, Mississippi, U.S.

Playing career
- 1904–1906: Vanderbilt
- Position: Tackle

Coaching career (HC unless noted)
- 1909: LSU

Head coaching record
- Overall: 4–1

Accomplishments and honors

Awards
- 2× All-Southern (1905, 1906); 1912 All-time Vandy 1st team

Joseph Gibson "Beersheba" Pritchard (May 15, 1886 – July 14, 1947) was an American college football player and coach. Pritchard played for the Vanderbilt Commodores of Vanderbilt University. He was selected All-Southern in 1905 and 1906. In 1915, John Heisman selected him as one of the 30 greatest Southern football players. He stood 6 foot 2 inches and weighed 185 pounds. Pritchard served as the head football coach at Louisiana State University (LSU) for part of one season in 1909, compiling a record is 4–1. He graduated from Vanderbilt in 1906 with a dental degree (DDS). A member of the Phi Delta Theta fraternity, he was later a Presbyterian dental missionary at Luebo in the Congo until he was forced to return to the United States due to poor health sometime before 1915.

In 1912, Pritchard married Annie Milicent Landrey of Jeanerette, Louisiana.

== Head coaching record ==
Year	Team	Overall	Conference	Standing	Bowl/playoffs
LSU Tigers (Southern Intercollegiate Athletic Association) (1909)
1909	LSU	4–1*	2–1*		
LSU:		4–1	2–1	*Last 3 games were coached by John W. Mayhew.	
Total:		4–1			
