= Albert Simmonds =

American football coach (1875–1953)

- Simmonds wearing his Yale jersey in an 1895 photo at LSU

Biographical details
- Born: October 29, 1875; Baltimore, Maryland, U.S.
- Died: November 13, 1953 (aged 78); New York, New York, U.S.

Coaching career (HC unless noted)
- 1894–1895: LSU

Head coaching record
- Overall: 5–1

Albert Price Simmonds (October 29, 1875 – November 13, 1953) was an American football coach. He served as the head football coach at Louisiana State University (LSU) for two seasons from 1894 to 1895, the second and third seasons in the LSU Tigers football program's existence, compiling a record of 5–1. Simmons was a graduate of Yale University. He was born in Baltimore, Maryland in 1875 and later was an insurance agent in New York City. In 1951, at the age of 76, Simmonds was working for the Hygienic Phone Service. He died on November 13, 1953.

== Head coaching record ==
Year	Team	Overall	Conference	Standing	Bowl/playoffs
LSU Tigers (Independent) (1894–1895)
1894	LSU	2–1			
1895	LSU	3–0			
LSU:		5–1			
Total:		5–1			
