= W. S. Borland =

American football and baseball coach

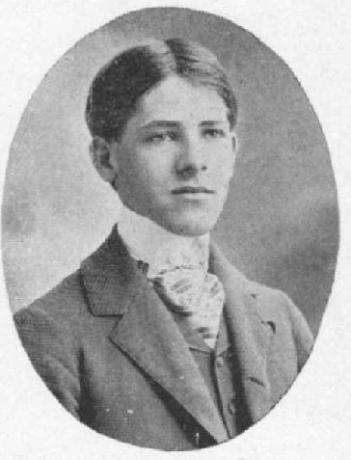
- W. S. Borland in 1898 edition of Allegheny College's Kaldron yearbook

Biographical details
- Born: February 1, 1878; Oil City, Pennsylvania, U.S.
- Died: November 22, 1959 (aged 81); Oil City, Pennsylvania, U.S.

Coaching career (HC unless noted)

Football
- 1901–1903: LSU

Baseball
- 1902–1903: LSU

Head coaching record
- Overall: 15–7 (football); 10–11–1 (baseball)

Walter Siverly Borland (sometimes spelled Boreland) (February 1, 1878 – November 22, 1959) was an American college football and college baseball coach. He served as the head football coach at Louisiana State University from 1901 to 1903, compiling a record of 15–7. Borland was also the head coach of the LSU baseball team from 1902 to 1903, tallying a mark of 10–11–1. Borland was a graduate of Allegheny College in 1900. While at Allegheny College, he was captain of the baseball team and sophomore class president in 1898. He was a member of Sigma Alpha Epsilon fraternity at Allegheny College. He died in 1959 and was buried in Oil City, Pennsylvania.

== Head coaching record ==
=== Football ===
Year	Team	Overall	Conference	Standing	Bowl/playoffs
LSU Tigers (Southern Intercollegiate Athletic Association) (1901–1903)
1901	LSU	5–1	2–1	T–3rd	
1902	LSU	6–1	5–1	T–2nd	
1903	LSU	4–5	0–5	17th	
LSU:		15–7	7–7		
Total:		15–7			

=== Baseball ===
Record table
Season	Team	Overall	Conference	Standing	Postseason
LSU Tigers (Southern Intercollegiate Athletic Association) (1902–1903)
1902	LSU	6–6–1			
1903	LSU	4–5			
LSU:		10–11–1 (.477)			
Total:		10–11–1 (.477)			
