= Unrivaled: Sewanee 1899 =

Documentary film on undefeated college football team in 1899

- Directed by: David Crews; Norman Jetmundsen
- Written by: Norman Jetmundsen
- Story by: Norman Jetmundsen
- Produced by: David Crews; Norman Jetmundsen
- Narrated by: Gates Shaw
- Edited by: Matthew Graves
- Music by: Bobby Horton
- Release date: 2022
- Country: United States
- Language: English

Unrivaled: Sewanee 1899 is a documentary film and book that chronicles Sewanee: The University of the South's undefeated 1899 football team.

== Story ==
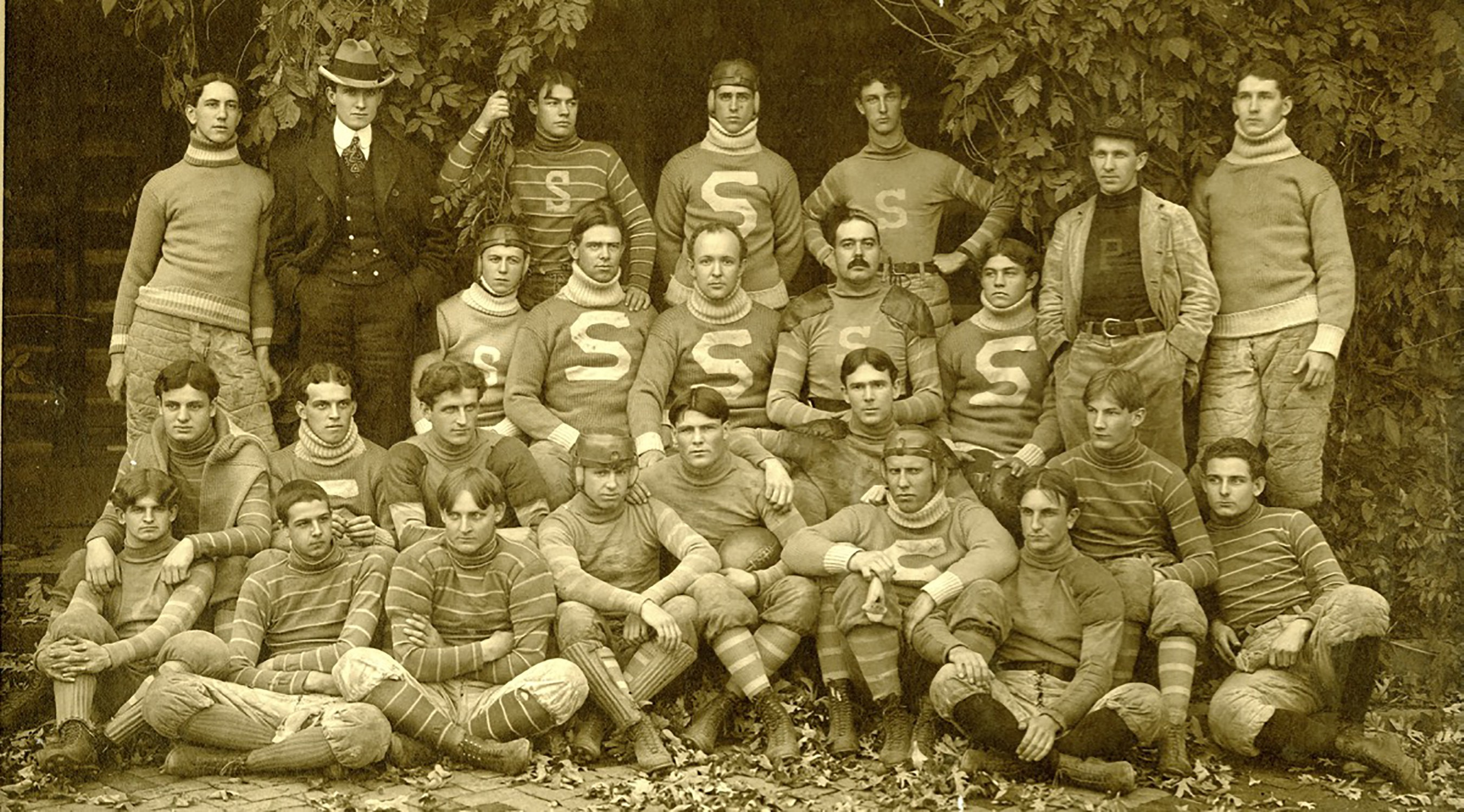
Sewanee Football Team of 1899

The 1899 Sewanee Tigers completed one of the greatest seasons in college football history. At a time when most teams in the South played only a few games a year due to the costs of travel, the Sewanee Tigers played a schedule of 12 games in a 6-week period, with 9 games on the road. What sets them apart from every other college football season, however, is that they traveled 2,500 miles by steam locomotive and played 5 games in 6 days, winning all of them by shutout by a combined score of 91-0. During that road trip, they played Texas in Austin on November 9; Texas A&M in Houston on November 10; Tulane in New Orleans on November 11, LSU in Baton Rouge on November 13; and Ole Miss in Memphis on November 14. It is unlikely any team will ever schedule such a road trip, let alone go undefeated.

During that year, Sewanee also played Georgia, Tennessee and Southwestern Presbyterian (now Rhodes College) before the road trip, and after the trip, they still had 3 more games to play against Cumberland, Auburn (coached by John Heisman), and North Carolina. Sewanee went undefeated, and at the end of the season, the team had scored 322 points to its opponents' 10.

The team included 20-year old manager Luke Lea, Head Coach, Billy Suter, and the players – known as the Iron Men – Team Captain Henry "Ditty" Seibels, Ormond Simkins, William "Wild Bill" Claiborne, William "Warbler" Wilson, Ringland "Rex" Kilpatrick, Hugh "Bunny" Pearce, and Ralph "Rip" Black. There were two African-American trainers who also traveled with the team, one of whom was Cal Burrows.

The film and book recount the developing game of football and why it became so popular in the South. The game was much more violent and brutal than today- a fast-paced running game with no forward passes, no huddles, scant protective gear, lots of punts, and no substitutions.

== Movie ==
The co-directors and producers of Unrivaled are David Crews and Norman Jetmundsen. The video editor is Matthew Graves. The script writer is Norman Jetmundsen.

The film contains archival photos, letters, and newspaper accounts, as well as over a dozen original paintings by artist Ernie Eldredge, an original music score by Bobby Horton (who does much of the music for Ken Burns' documentaries), and narration by Gates Shaw. It also has interviews with such legendary coaches as Bobby Bowden, Johnny Majors, Vince Dooley, and Nick Saban, as well as Kirk Herbstreit, Tony Barnhart, Jon Meacham, Phil Savage, Kent Stephens from the College Football Hall of Fame, and Woody Register, professor of history at The University of the South. It also has interviews with a number of descendants of the team.

Unrivaled has also been broadcast on numerous public television stations all over the United States. The World Channel broadcast the film in September 2023. Unrivaled is distributed to public television stations by the National Educational Telecommunications Association ("NETA"), the national distributor for public television stations, which made the film available nationwide starting November 5, 2022. NETA now provides stations with both a 90-minute and 60-minute broadcast option. The film may also be viewed on PBS.org.

From January 1, 2025, through April 30, 2025, the documentary film could be seen on all Delta Air Lines flights.

== Book ==
Unrivaled: Sewanee 1899
- Editor: Susan Alison; Taylor Jetmundsen
- Author: Norman Jetmundsen; Karin Dupree Fecteau
- Illustrator: Ernie Eldredge; Jim Trusilo
- Cover artist: Karin Dupree Fecteau
- Language: English
- Subject: Sports and history
- Genre: Sports History; Coffee Table
- Set in: 1899
- Publisher: Shakerag Hollow Press
- Publication date: September 15, 2024
- Publication place: USA
- Media type: Coffee Table Book
- ISBN: 9798218420192
- Followed by: Documentary Film: Unrivaled: Sewanee 1899
- Website: www.sewanee1899.org
- Printer: Fletch Printing & Creative, Birmingham, AL Web Designer: Fred -- Communication by Design, Birmingham, AL

There is a companion coffee table book also titled, Unrivaled: Sewanee 1899. It is authored by Norman Jetmundsen and graphic artist, Karin Dupree Fecteau. It was published in September 2024 by Shakerag Hollow Press. It also chronicles the team and its season, with added information not in the edited film. It contains 16 original paintings (14 by Ernie Eldredge and 2 by Jim Trusilo). It has images of photographs, letters, and other archival material. It also has a QR Code which allows the reader to listen to Bobby Horton's film music score. The printer was Fletch Print and Creative, Birmingham, AL.

== Awards ==
=== Documentary ===
- Nominated: Southeast Regional Emmy for Best Historical Documentary.
- The film was accepted into several film festivals: Cobb International Film Festival (where it was named Best Local Film), Cookeville Film Festival, Birmingham Sidewalk Film Festival, Oxford, Mississippi Film Festival, Austin Lift-Off Film Festival, Tennessee International Film Festival, Beaufort South Carolina Film Festival, Knoxville Film Festival (1st Place Documentary Feature Film & 1st Place Tennessee Documentary Film), and the Hollywood Gold Awards (Honorable Mention).

=== Book ===
- Book of the Year (2024) and Best Sports Book: The Literary Global Awards
- Best Sports Book and Best Cover Design of 2024: The American Writing Awards
- Gold Award: The Literary Titan Awards
- Best Coffee Table Book (2025): Independent Press Awards
- Winner, Best Sports Book (2024): Firebird Book Awards
- Gold Winner, Best Book Design (2025): American Advertising Awards (ADDY), Birmingham
- Best Cover Non-Fiction, Runner-Up: Bedside Reading
- Finalist: Book Excellence Awards
- Winner, Best Book and Best History Book, Late Winter/Early Spring 2025: Great Southeast Book Festival
- Finalist: Coffee Table Books: 2024 Foreword Indies
- Bronze Winner: Non-Fiction Book Awards
- Winner: Sports, April 2025, International Impact Book Awards
- Platinum Winner: Hermes Creative Awards 2025
- Silver Winner: Sports/Fitness/Recreation, Independent Publisher Book Awards (IPPY)
- Finalist: Best Overall Design, Non-Fiction, Next Generation Indies Award
- Winner: 2025 Best Sports Book, Non-Fiction, American Legacy Book Awards
- Third Place: History, Incipere Book Awards 2024
- Finalist: Best Sports Book 2025, International Book Awards
- Winner: Best Sports Book; Finalist: Best Coffee Table Book, National Indie Excellence Awards
- Finalist: Sports, Storytrade Awards
- Finalist: Book Excellence Award
- Winner: Sports, NYC Big Book Award
- Second Place, Silver: The BookFest Awards
- Winner, Independent Author Network (IAN) Non-Fiction History Book of the Year
- Runner Up: Best Sports Book of the Year (2025), American Writing Awards

== Reviews ==
=== Book ===
- There are several independent reviews of the book.
