= 1899 Southern Intercollegiate Athletic Association football season =

- League: NCAA
- Sport: College football
- Duration: October 6, 1899 through December 25, 1899
- Teams: 17

Regular Season
- Season champions: Sewanee

Football seasons
- ← 1898 1900 →

1899 Southern Intercollegiate Athletic Association football standings
	Conf.					Overall
Team	W		L		T	W		L		T
Sewanee $	11	–	0	–	0	12	–	0	–	0
Vanderbilt	5	–	0	–	0	7	–	2	–	0
Alabama	1	–	0	–	0	3	–	1	–	0
Nashville	4	–	1	–	0	4	–	1	–	1
Tennessee	2	–	1	–	0	6	–	2	–	0
Auburn	2	–	1	–	1	3	–	1	–	1
Texas	3	–	2	–	0	6	–	2	–	0
North Carolina	1	–	1	–	0	7	–	3	–	0
Ole Miss	3	–	4	–	0	3	–	4	–	0
Georgia	2	–	3	–	1	2	–	3	–	1
Clemson	1	–	2	–	0	4	–	2	–	0
Central (KY)	1	–	2	–	0	1	–	2	–	0
LSU	1	–	3	–	0	1	–	4	–	0
Kentucky State	0	–	1	–	0	5	–	2	–	2
SW Presbyterian	0	–	1	–	0	1	–	1	–	0
Cumberland (TN)	0	–	3	–	0	0	–	3	–	0
Georgia Tech	0	–	5	–	0	0	–	6	–	0
Tulane	0	–	5	–	0	0	–	6	–	1
$ – Conference champion

The 1899 Southern Intercollegiate Athletic Association football season was the college football games played by the member schools of the Southern Intercollegiate Athletic Association as part of the 1899 college football season.

The season began on October 6, 1899 with Vanderbilt visiting Cumberland.

Sewanee won the conference with 11 conference victories. With just 13 players, the team known as the "Iron Men" had a six-day road trip with five shutout wins over Texas A&M; Texas; Tulane; LSU; and Ole Miss. Sportswriter Grantland Rice called the group "the most durable football team I ever saw." The road trip is recalled memorably with the Biblical allusion "...and on the seventh day they rested."

== Season overview ==
=== Results and team statistics ===
Conf. Rank	Team	Head coach	Conf. record	Win Pct.	Overall record	PPG	PAG
1 (tie)	Sewanee	Billy Suter	11–0–0	1.000	12–0–0	26.8	0.8
1 (tie)	Vanderbilt	James Crane	5–0–0	1.000	7–2–0	12.1	4.8
1 (tie)	Alabama	W. A. Martin	1–0–0	1.000	3–1–0	9.7	7.7
4	Nashville	C. E. Woodruff	4–1–0	.800	4–1–1		
5	Tennessee	J. A. Pierce	2–1–0	.667	6–2–0	10.7	7.6
6	Auburn	John Heisman	2–1–1	.625	3–1–1	29.6	2.2
7	Texas	Gordon Clarke	3–2–0	.600	6–2–0	14.6	3.0
8	North Carolina	William Reynolds	1–1–0	.500	7–3–0	15.7	5.3
9	Ole Miss	W. H. Lyon	3–4–0	.429	3–4–0	6.3	6.7
10	Georgia	Gordon Saussy	2–3–1	.417	2–3–1	7.3	3.7
11 (tie)	Clemson	Walter Riggs	1–2–0	.333	4–2–0	18.2	8.3
11 (tie)	Central (KY)		1–2–0	.333	1–2–0		
13	LSU	John Gregg	1–3–0	.250	1–4–0	7.6	25.2
14 (tie)	Kentucky State	W. R. Bass	0–1–0	.000	5–2–2	10.9	4.9
14 (tie)	SW Presbyterian		0–1–0	.000	1–1–0	22.5	27
14 (tie)	Cumberland (TN)	E. D. Kuykendall	0–3–0	.000	0–3–0	0.0	40.3
14 (tie)	Georgia Tech	Cow Nalley	0–5–0	.000	0–6–0	0.8	31.0
14 (tie)	Tulane	Harris Collier	0–5–0	.000	0–6–1	0.0	20.1

Key PPG = Average of points scored per game
PAG = Average of points allowed per game

=== Regular season ===
Index to colors and formatting
Non-conference matchup; SIAA member won
Non-conference matchup; SIAA member lost
Non-conference matchup; tie
Conference matchup

SIAA teams in bold.

==== Week One ====
Date	Visiting team	Home team	Site	Result	Attendance	Reference
October 6	**Vanderbilt**	Cumberland	Lebanon, TN	**VAN** 32–0		
October 7	**Clemson**	Georgia	Herty Field • Athens, GA	**UGA** 11–0		
October 7	Kentucky University	Kentucky State	Lexington, KY	**W** 23–6		
October 7	North Carolina A&M	North Carolina	Campus Athletic Field • Chapel Hill, NC	**W** 34–0		
October 11	King (TN)	Tennessee	Baldwin Park • Knoxville, TN	**W** 11–5		
October 12	Oak Ridge	North Carolina	Campus Athletic Field • Chapel Hill, NC	**W** 16–0		

==== Week Two ====
Date	Visiting team	Home team	Site	Result	Attendance	Reference
October 14	Mooney School	SW Presbyterian	Ball Park • Clarksville, TN	**W** 45–0		
October 14	**Nashville**	Cumberland	Lebanon, TN	**NASH** 18–0		
October 14	Miami (OH)	Vanderbilt	Dudley Field • Nashville, TN	**W** 12–0		
October 14	**Georgia Tech**	Auburn	Drill Field • Auburn, AL	**AUB** 63–0		
October 14	Davidson	Clemson	Rock Hill, SC	**W** 10–0		
October 14	Guilford	North Carolina	Campus Athletic Field • Chapel Hill, NC	**W** 45–0		
October 18	Miami (OH)	Kentucky State	Lexington, KY	**W** 18–5		
October 18	Atlanta Athletic Club	Georgia Tech	Piedmont Park • Atlanta, GA	**L** 0–2		

==== Week Three ====
Date	Visiting team	Home team	Site	Result	Attendance	Reference
October 20	Cincinnati	**Vanderbilt**	Dudley Field • Nashville, TN	**L** 6–0		
October 21	**Kentucky State**	Centre	Danville, KY	**T** 11–11		
October 21	Bethel (KY)	**Nashville**	Normal College Field • Nashville, TN	**T** 5–5		
October 21	**Texas**	Dallas Athletic Club	Dallas, TX	**W** 11–6		
October 21	Tuscaloosa Athletic Club	**Alabama**	The Quad • Tuscaloosa, AL	**W** 16–5		
October 21	Montgomery Athletic Club	**Auburn**	Drill Field • Auburn, AL	**W** 41–0		
October 21	**Sewanee**	**Georgia**	Piedmont Park • Atlanta, GA	**SEW** 12–0		
October 21	Davidson	**North Carolina**	Latta Park • Charlotte, NC	**W** 10–0		
October 21	VPI	**Tennessee**	Baldwin Park • Knoxville, TN	**L** 5–0		
October 23	**Sewanee**	**Georgia Tech**	Piedmont Park • Atlanta, GA	**SEW** 32–0		
October 23	Horner's School	**North Carolina**	Campus Athletic Field • Chapel Hill, NC	**W** 46–0		

==== Week Four ====
Date	Visiting team	Home team	Site	Result	Attendance	Reference
October 27	**Ole Miss**	**Central (KY)**	Citizens' Park • Memphis, TN	**MISS** 13–6		
October 28	**Nashville**	**Ole Miss**	Oxford, MS	**NASH** 11–0		
October 28	**Tennessee**	**Sewanee**	Hardee Field • Sewanee, TN	**SEW** 46–0		
October 28	Indiana	**Vanderbilt**	Dudley Field • Nashville, TN	**L** 22–0		
October 28	**Clemson**	**Auburn**	Drill Field • Auburn, AL	**AUB** 34–0		
October 28	**Georgia Tech**	**Georgia**	Herty Field • Athens, GA	**UGA** 33–0		
October 28	**North Carolina**	North Carolina A&M	Raleigh, NC	**T** 11–11		
October 31	San Antonio	**Texas**	Varsity Athletic Field • Austin, TX	**W** 28–0		
October 31	"Old" Maryland	**North Carolina**	Campus Athletic Field • Chapel Hill, NC	**W** 6–0		

==== Week Five ====
Date	Visiting team	Home team	Site	Result	Attendance	Reference
November 3	**SW Presbyterian**	**Sewanee**	Hardee Field • Sewanee, TN	**SEW** 54–0		
November 3	**LSU**	**Ole Miss**	Fairgrounds • Meridian, MS	**MISS** 11–0	5,000	
November 4	**North Carolina**	Navy	Worden Field • Annapolis, MD	**L** 0–12		
November 4	**Kentucky State**	**Tennessee**	Baldwin Park • Knoxville, TN	**TENN** 12–0		
November 4	**Ole Miss**	**Vanderbilt**	Billings Park • Memphis, TN	**VAN** 11–0		
November 4	Texas A&M	**Texas**	San Antonio, TX	**W** 6–0		
November 8	**North Carolina**	Princeton	University Field • Princeton, NJ	**L** 0–30		
November 9	**Clemson**	South Carolina	Columbia, SC	**W** 34–0		
November 9	**Sewanee**	**Texas**	Varsity Athletic Field • Austin, TX	**SEW** 12–0	2,500	

==== Week Six ====
Date	Visiting team	Home team	Site	Result	Attendance	Reference
November 10	**Sewanee**	Texas A&M	Herald Park • Houston, TX	**W** 10–0	600	
November 11	**Sewanee**	**Tulane**	Tulane Athletic Field • New Orleans, LA	**SEW** 23–0	~1,000	
November 11	**Central (KY)**	**Kentucky State**	Lexington, KY	**CENT** 5–0		
November 11	Montgomery Athletic Club	**Alabama**	The Quad • Tuscaloosa, AL	**W** 16–0		
November 11	**Georgia**	**Tennessee**	Baldwin Park • Knoxville, TN	**TENN** 5–0		
November 11	**Nashville**	**Georgia Tech**	Piedmont Park • Atlanta, GA	**NASH** 15–0		
November 11	Bethel (TN)	**Vanderbilt**	Dudley Field • Nashville, TN	**W** 22–0		
November 13	**Sewanee**	**LSU**	State Field • Baton Rouge, LA	**SEW** 34–0	2,000+	
November 13	**Sewanee**	**Ole Miss**	Billings Park • Memphis, TN	**SEW** 12–0		

==== Week Seven ====
Date	Visiting team	Home team	Site	Result	Attendance	Reference
November 18	North Carolina A&M	Clemson	Rock Hill, SC	**W** 24–0		
November 18	**Auburn**	Georgia	Piedmont Park • Atlanta, GA	**T** 0–0		
November 18	**Texas**	Vanderbilt	Dudley Field • Nashville, TN	**VAN** 6–0		
November 18	**SW Presbyterian**	Nashville	Normal College Field • Nashville, TN	**NASH** 39–0		
November 20	**Texas**	Tulane	Tulane Athletic Field • New Orleans, LA	**TEX** 11–0		
November 20	**Cumberland**	Sewanee	Hardee Field • Sewanee, TN	**SEW** 71–0		
November 21	Washington and Lee	Kentucky State	Lexington, KY	**T** 0–0		
November 22	Washington and Lee	Kentucky State	Lexington, KY	**W** 6–0		
November 23	Washington and Lee	Tennessee	Baldwin Park • Knoxville, TN	**W** 11–0		

==== Week Eight ====
Date	Time	Visiting team	Home team	Site	Result	Attendance	Reference
November 24		**Alabama**	**Ole Miss**	Driving Park • Jackson, MS	**ALA** 7–5	600	
November 25		**Alabama**	New Orleans Athletic Club	Athletic Park • New Orleans, LA	**L** 21–0		
November 25		**Central (KY)**	**Vanderbilt**	Dudley Field • Nashville, TN	**VAN** 21–16		
November 25		**Tulane**	**Texas**	Varsity Athletic Field • Austin, TX	**TEX** 32–0		
November 27		**Tulane**	Texas A&M	Herald Park • Houston, TX	**L** 22–0		
November 28		**LSU**	Lake Charles High School	Hoohoo Park • Lake Charles, LA	**W** 48–0		
November 30	2:50 p. m.	**Sewanee**	**Auburn**	Riverside Park • Montgomery, AL	**SEW** 11–10		
November 30		Kentucky Alumni	**Kentucky State**	Lexington, KY	**W** 6–5		
November 30		**Georgia Tech**	**Clemson**	Greenville, SC	**CLEM** 41–5		
November 30		**North Carolina**	**Georgia**	Piedmont Park • Atlanta, GA	**UNC** 5–0	3,000	
November 30		**LSU**	**Texas**	Varsity Athletic Field • Austin, TX	**TEX** 29–0		
November 30		**Ole Miss**	**Tulane**	Tulane Athletic Field • New Orleans, LA	**MISS** 15–0		
November 30		Kentucky University	**Tennessee**	Baldwin Park • Knoxville, TN	**W** 41–0		
November 30		**Nashville**	**Vanderbilt**	Dudley Field • Nashville, TN	**VAN** 5–0	4,000	

==== Week Nine ====
Date	Visiting team	Home team	Site	Result	Attendance	Reference
December 2	**North Carolina**	**Sewanee**	Piedmont Park • Atlanta, GA	**SEW** 5–0	2,000	
December 2	**LSU**	Texas A&M	College Station, TX	**L** 42–0		

==== Week Ten ====
Date	Visiting team	Home team	Site	Result	Attendance	Reference
December 8	**Tulane**	**LSU**	State Field • Baton Rouge, LA	**LSU** 38–0		

==== Week Twelve ====
Date	Visiting team	Home team	Site	Result	Attendance	Reference
December 25	**Tennessee**	Grant	Chattanooga, TN	**W** 6–0		

== All-Southern team ==
W. A. Lambeth's All-Southern team:

Position	Name	Team
QB	Warbler Wilson	Sewanee
HB	Arthur Feagin	Auburn
HB	Harry Gerstle	Virginia
FB	Robert M. Coleman	Virginia
E	Bart Sims	Sewanee
T	W. Hamilton	Georgia
G	William Choice	VPI
C	Carlos A. Long	Georgetown
G	Wallace Crutchfield	Vanderbilt
T	John Loyd	Virginia
E	Herman Koehler	North Carolina
