= W. Hamilton =

American football player

Profile
- Position: Tackle

Personal information
- Listed height: 5 ft 11 in (1.80 m)
- Listed weight: 185 lb (84 kg)

Career information
- College: Georgia (1899)

Awards and highlights
- All-Southern (1899)

W. Hamilton was a college football player.

== University of Georgia ==
He was a prominent tackle for the Georgia Bulldogs football team of the University of Georgia, then considered the best the school had ever boasted at the position.

=== 1899 ===
Hamilton was selected All-Southern in 1899. He enabled the last score in the Clemson game by his work. He was the "superior of any man in the line" in the close loss to North Carolina.
