= Henry Seibels =

American sportsman (1876-1967)

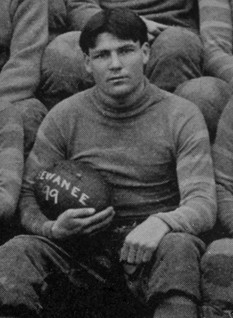
- Seibels in 1899 team photo

Profile
- Position: Halfback

Personal information
- Born: August 22, 1876; Montgomery, Alabama, U.S.
- Died: September 29, 1967 (aged 91); Birmingham, Alabama, U.S.
- Listed height: 5 ft 10 in (1.78 m)
- Listed weight: 170 lb (77 kg)

Career information
- High school: Starke University Academy
- College: Sewanee (1897–1900)

Awards and highlights
- 2× SIAA champion (1898, 1899); 2× All-Southern (1899, 1900); All-Time Sewanee team; Sewanee Athletics Hall of Fame
- College Football Hall of Fame (Class of 1973)

Henry Goldthwaite "Ditty" Seibels (August 22, 1876 – September 29, 1967) was a prominent American athlete, playing football, baseball, and golf for the Sewanee Tigers of Sewanee: The University of the South.

== Early life ==
Seibels was born in Montgomery to Colonel Emmett Seibels and Anne Goldthwaite.

== Sewanee ==
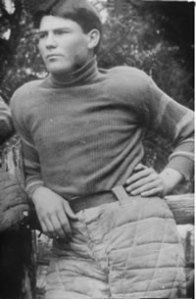

Seibels is best known as the running back and captain on the undefeated 1899 Sewanee Tigers football team. Known as the "Iron Men," they had a six-day road trip with five shutout wins over Texas A&M; Texas; Tulane; LSU; and Ole Miss. Recalled memorably with the phrase "..and on the seventh day they rested." The biggest fear of the road trip was injuries, as players who left a game were not allowed to return. In the very first game of that road trip, with Texas, Seibels got a gash on his forehead which was stuck together with "sticking plaster." Seibels scored two touchdowns in that game, and only missed the Tulane game. He scored a Sewanee record 19 touchdowns in 1899. He was nominated though not selected for an Associated Press All-Time Southeast 1869-1919 era team. A documentary film about the team and Seibels' role was released in 2022, called "Unrivaled: Sewanee 1899."

Seibels also captained the baseball team that year; and it too went undefeated. He was elected to the College Football Hall of Fame in 1973, and is also a member of the Sewanee Athletics Hall of Fame. After college, he was headmaster of Sewanee Grammar School and then moved to Birmingham and was in the insurance business. Seibels' athleticism was vast, for in 1922 he was the Alabama state golf champion. He was awarded an Honorary Degree by the University of the South in 1956.

Seibels died on September 29, 1967, at age 91 and was the oldest surviving member of the Team of 1899.
