= Hulette F. Aby =

American attorney (1879–1935)

- Born: January 15, 1879; Crystal Springs, Mississippi, United States
- Died: April 8, 1935 (aged 56); Tulsa, Oklahoma, United States
- Education: Millsaps College
- Occupation: Lawyer
- Years active: 1902–1935
- Spouse: Cora Mae Hansel
- Children: H. F. Aby Jr. William Willing Aby
- Football career

LSU Tigers
- Position: Tackle

Career information
- College: LSU (1898–1899)

Hulette Fuqua "Red" Aby (January 15, 1879 – April 8, 1935) was an American attorney in Tulsa, Oklahoma, of the firm Aby & Tucker.

== Birth and family ==
Hulette Fuqua was born to Samuel Hulette Aby Jr. and Mary J. Willing on January 15, 1879 in Crystal Springs, Mississippi. His father had served in the American Civil War, and afterwards studied journalism at the University of Mississippi and University of Virginia. In 1881, he began editing and publishing the Crystal Springs Monitor newspaper.

His uncle Jonas Catchings Aby was a columnist for the New Orleans States newspaper. Another uncle, Thomas Young Aby, was a surgeon captured at Gettysburg, who escaped from Fort McHenry.

His grandfather Samuel H. Aby Sr. was a cotton merchant with P. S. Catchings, who signed the Ordinance of Secession. His great-grandfather Jonas Aby served in the War of 1812, whose wife Barbara Hulett lived at Thorndale Farm. Hulette was named for his great-great-grandfather, Revolutionary War drummer Charles Hulett.

=== College ===
He attended the University of Mississippi in 1896 and 1897, then Louisiana State University in 1898 and 1899, where he was a member of the football team, and captain of the 1899 team which lost to the "Iron Men" of Sewanee. He received his LL. B. in 1901 from Millsaps College.

== Tulsa ==
He moved to Tulsa in 1902. In 1905 he formed Aby & Tucker with William Frank Tucker. In 1906 he married Cora Mae Hansel.

Aby was president of the TCBA in 1926.
