= Walter H. Simmons =

American football player and surgeon

Walter Simmons
Profile
- Position: End

Personal information
- Born: July 26, 1879; Carrollton, Mississippi

Career information
- College: Vanderbilt (1897, 1899–1901)

Awards and highlights
- All-Southern (1899)

Walter Hineman Simmons Sr. (July 26, 1879 – ?) was a college football player and surgeon.

== Early life ==
Walter H. Simmons was born in Carrollton, Mississippi in July 1879, the son of Harry Simmons and Delia Johnston.

== Vanderbilt University ==
Simmons completed a literary course at Vanderbilt University as a member of the class of 1901. He then pursued a medical degree as the class of 1903.

=== Football ===
He was a prominent end for the Vanderbilt Commodores football team.

==== 1899 ====
Simmons was captain of the 1899 team, selected All-Southern by Sewanee coach Billy Suter.

=== Basketball ===
==== 1900–01 ====
He was also a member of the 1900–01 basketball team, the school's first official squad.

== Surgeon ==
After college, he moved to Arkansas and practiced there in various cities.
