= William Henry Poole =

American football player, minister (1876–1921)

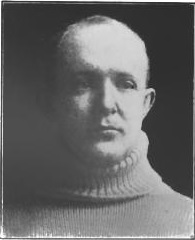

Sewanee Tigers
- Position: Center
- Class: 1899

Personal information
- Born: February 16, 1876; Tallahassee, Florida, U.S.
- Died: June 12, 1921 (aged 45); Graham, Virginia, U.S.
- Listed height: 6 ft 0 in (1.83 m)
- Listed weight: 185 lb (84 kg)

Career information
- College: Sewanee (1899–1900)

Awards and highlights
- SIAA championship (1899); All-Southern (1899, 1900)

William Henry Poole (February 19, 1876 – June 12, 1921) was a college football player while a divinity student, and later a minister.

== Early life ==
He was born on February 19, 1876, in Tallahassee, Florida, to Augusta Jane Anderson and William Gaither Poole. His family later moved to Glyndon, Maryland.

== Sewanee ==
Poole was a prominent center for the Sewanee Tigers of Sewanee: The University of the South, a small Episcopal school in the mountains of Tennessee. At Sewanee he studied theology.

In 1899 he was a member of the "Iron Men" of 1899 who went undefeated, winning five road games in six days all by shutout. One source reported Poole "drank heavily" on the one day off.

In 1900 Poole was selected All-Southern.

== Minister ==
He became assistant at Christ Church, Cincinnati, in 1906, and while there he married Shirley Nelson Morgan. They had a son, Morgan.

He became the rector of St. Paul's Church in 1910 in Jackson, Michigan. One source called him "one of the leading orators of southern Michigan." In Jackson, he was a member of the Rotary Club.

During World War I he served as YMCA chaplain in France.

== Nervous breakdown and death ==
He had a nervous breakdown and was taken to a sanitarium in Graham, Virginia, in 1920. He killed himself with a gun, in a bout of depression on June 12, 1921. His death certificate lists the cause of death as "suicide, shot through base of skull" caused by "partial insanity, melancholia". He was buried in Mount Evergreen Cemetery in Jackson, Michigan.
