= 1899 Georgia Tech football team =

American college football season

1899 Georgia Tech football
- Conference: Southern Intercollegiate Athletic Association
- Record: 0–6 (0–5 SIAA)
- Head coach: R. B. Nalley (1st season)
- Captain: Pete Wooley
- Home stadium: Piedmont Park

1899 Southern Intercollegiate Athletic Association football standings
	Conf.					Overall
Team	W		L		T	W		L		T
Sewanee $	11	–	0	–	0	12	–	0	–	0
Vanderbilt	5	–	0	–	0	7	–	2	–	0
Alabama	1	–	0	–	0	3	–	1	–	0
Nashville	4	–	1	–	0	4	–	1	–	1
Tennessee	2	–	1	–	0	6	–	2	–	0
Auburn	2	–	1	–	1	3	–	1	–	1
Texas	3	–	2	–	0	6	–	2	–	0
North Carolina	1	–	1	–	0	7	–	3	–	0
Ole Miss	3	–	4	–	0	3	–	4	–	0
Georgia	2	–	3	–	1	2	–	3	–	1
Clemson	1	–	2	–	0	4	–	2	–	0
Central (KY)	1	–	2	–	0	1	–	2	–	0
LSU	1	–	3	–	0	1	–	4	–	0
Kentucky State	0	–	1	–	0	5	–	2	–	2
SW Presbyterian	0	–	1	–	0	1	–	1	–	0
Cumberland (TN)	0	–	3	–	0	0	–	3	–	0
Georgia Tech	0	–	5	–	0	0	–	6	–	0
Tulane	0	–	5	–	0	0	–	6	–	1
$ – Conference champion

The 1899 Georgia Tech football team represented the Georgia School of Technology during the 1899 college football season.

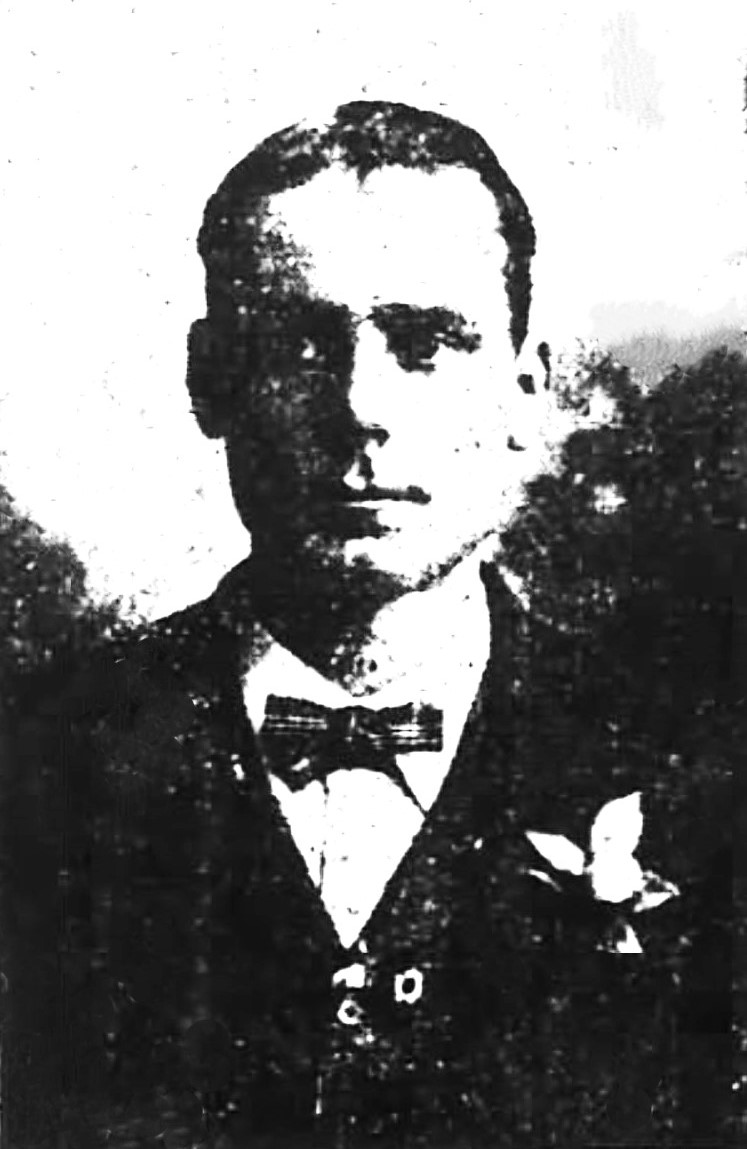
Coach Nalley, 1899

Following the winless 1898 season, Georgia Tech's administration placed a renewed interest in vitalizing the football program and announced its attention to hiring "an up-to-date and thoroughly capable coach" who would be "one of the best in the country and will devote his entire time to training the football team." On September 18, Tech announced the hiring of R. B. Nalley to coach the team. Nalley was well known in the city having been a prominent player and captain for Georgia. Nalley's hiring provoked much excitement with hopes that the season would feature one of Tech's best teams in its history. Georgia Tech also hired M. P. O'Connor, a former player of Vanderbilt as an assistant professor and physical director. R. B. Sullivan was named manager of the team.

Nalley promised an excellent team and opened practices before the school officially opened for the school year. He was a very passionate coach and was accused of being unsportsmanlike by calling out plays and adjustments to his team during games. Georgia Tech had weekly practices with the Atlanta Athletic Club. Pete Wooley was named captain.

Despite the optimism, the 1899 season was one of the worst in the school's history. The team finished with a record of 0–6 and scored in only one game. Georgia Tech coming no closer than three touchdowns in all five of its conference games.

== Schedule ==
Date	Time	Opponent	Site	Result	Attendance	Source
October 14	3:00 p.m.	at Auburn	Drill Field; Auburn, AL (rivalry)	L 0–63 (Note: Newspaper accounts differ on Auburn's final score: either 63 or 64 depending on the publication. Both the Auburn and Georgia Tech information guides have Auburn winning 63–0.)		
October 18	4:00 p.m.	Atlanta Athletic Club (Note: The Georgia Tech football information guide erroneously omits this game.)*	Piedmont Park; Atlanta, GA	L 0–2		
October 23	3:00 p.m.	Sewanee	Piedmont Park; Atlanta, GA	L 0–32 (Note: The Georgia Tech football information guide erroneously lists the score as 30–0, but newspaper accounts report Sewanee scored six touchdowns and two extra points.)		
October 28		at Georgia	Alumni Athletic Field; Athens, GA (rivalry)	L 0–33 (Note: The Georgia Tech football information guide erroneously lists the score as 20–0, but Georgia had already scored 22 in the first half.)		
November 11	3:00 p.m.	Nashville	Piedmont Park; Atlanta, GA	L 0–15		
November 18		at Tennessee	Baldwin Park; Knoxville, TN	Cancelled (Note: The game was cancelled due to Georgia Tech's inability to travel to Knoxville for reasons unknown.)		
November 30	12:24 p.m.	vs. Clemson	Greenville, SC (rivalry)	L 5–41		
*Non-conference game

Georgia Tech played a practice game against the Atlanta Athletic Club on October 10, 1899, which ended in a 0–0 tie (this game was originally scheduled for October 7 but had to be postponed due to inclement weather). Only fifteen minute halves were played. In fact, several of the Atlanta players were unable to get off from work to play and an outsider had to be asked to join in order for the team to field the eleven requisite players. Georgia Tech had also started plans for a game against a local Macon, Georgia, team, the Macon Volunteers, on November 25, though the game did not materialize.

== Game summaries ==
Georgia Tech Techs (0–0–0) at Auburn Tigers (0–0–0)

Quarter	1	2	Total
Georgia Tech	0	0	0
Auburn	20	43	63

at Drill Field • Auburn, Alabama

- Date: Saturday, October 14, 1899
- Game time: 3:00 p.m.
- Game attendance: Unknown
- Referee: Unknown

The first game of the season for both schools was the fifth meeting in the rivalry, with Auburn winning all four previous games and averaging over 47 points per game. It was expected that the 1899 match would be close and Auburn had been a little uneasy in the lead-up to the game.

However, once the game began, it was clear that Georgia Tech was entirely outclassed as Auburn scored twice in the first few minutes of the game and Auburn was able to rush through Tech's line like it "was nothing but a piece of tissue paper". Auburn scored 20 in the first half and 43 in the second in what was called the "Cyclonic Waterloo for the Techs" and "probably the worst defeat that any football team ever received" by one Alabama paper. The Atlanta papers were more kind, stating that Georgia Tech had played well and looked like "the best team the Techs have ever sent out". It was a clean match without any injuries, but the warm weather affected the play. With the 63 to 0 loss, Tech's high expectations for the season were severely humbled.

Atlanta Athletic Club Atlantans (0–0–0) at Georgia Tech Techs (0–1–0)

Quarter	1	2	Total
Atlanta	2	0	2
Georgia Tech	0	0	0

at Piedmont Park • Atlanta, Georgia

- Date: Wednesday, October 18, 1899
- Game time: 4:00 p.m.
- Game attendance: Unknown
- Referee: Dickeson

Georgia Tech had already played a practice game against the Atlanta Athletic Club to a 0–0 tie on October 10. The teams had also played a match the previous season with the Atlantans winning 11–0. Admission to the game was twenty-five cents, which included a return ticket to the fair grounds at the park. The crowds were very rowdy and at times they rushed onto the field looking for fights.

The game was called exciting, hard-fought, and scrappy, but no one that was played in the style of trained college players, equally poorly by both sides. Coach Nalley was also criticized for calling plays and adjustments to his team, which was considered unsportsmanlike.

The ball remained in the Georgia Tech half almost the entire game with Atlanta having long runs of 25 and 30 yards. The Techs never threatened Atlanta's goal. However, Tech's defense prevented Atlanta from scoring a touchdown including one defensive stop at its 1-yard line. Sullivan, Tech's right halfback, performing outstanding tackling and defensive work. The only score of the game occurred on a first-half safety as Atlanta tackled Merritt in Tech's own endzone. The game was called after ten minutes into the second half due to darkness, with Atlanta winning by a score of 2 to 0.

Sewanee Tigers (1–0–0) at Georgia Tech Techs (0–2–0)

Quarter	1	2	Total
Sewanee	27	5	32
Georgia Tech	0	0	0

at Piedmont Park • Atlanta, Georgia

- Date: Monday, October 23, 1899
- Game time: 3:00 p.m.
- Game attendance: "A small crowd"; "a large crowd"
- Referee: G. W. Rowbotham

While in Atlanta to play (and ultimately defeat) Georgia, Sewanee made arrangements to play Georgia Tech as well and the game was scheduled two days after its Georgia match. The 1899 Sewanee team was one of the best teams of all time, finishing with a 12–0–0 record and shutting out all but one team. At one stretch of the season, Sewanee shutout five teams in six days. This was Georgia Tech's first time playing Sewanee. The teams played twenty-minute halves in weather "too warm for football".

The game did not start off well for the Techs: in the first minute, Cunningham threw the snap over Merritt's head, and while he was able to recover it, his punt attempt was blocked and returned by Sewanee for a touchdown. Sewanee was the better team from the beginning of the game and was able to run around the right end effectively the entire game. Tech's captain, Wooley, did manage to block a Sewanee punt on their ten-yard line, but the team could not fall onto the ball in time. For their part, Sewanee made several long runs including those by Seibles of 35, 60, and 80 yards and Tech was unable to stop the running attack. The half ended with Sewanee leading 27 to 0.

In the second half, Sewanee substituted four players but continued to hold its line. Tech Coach Nalley substituted Maddox for Merritt at fullback, who played very well. Sullivan and Pete Wooley, Tech's captain, also showed great skill and effort. Overall, Tech played much better in the second half. At one point, Tech got within ten yards of Sewanee's goal but were stopped. Sewanee could only manage one touchdown in the second half and one the game 32 to 0.

Georgia Tech Techs (0–3–0) at Georgia 'Varsity (1–1–0)

Quarter	1	2	Total
Georgia Tech	0	0	0
Georgia	22	11	33

at Alumni Athletic Field • Athens, Georgia

- Date: Saturday, October 28, 1899
- Game time: Unknown
- Game attendance: Unknown
- Referee: Unknown

Georgia entered the game 1–1–0 with a win against Clemson and a loss against Sewanee. This was the fourth chapter in their rival with Georgia holding a 1–2–0 record for their three previous matches. Two twenty-five minute halves were used. The game was played under oppressively warm weather, and both teams slowed in the second half.

Georgia took the opening drive in for a touchdown, setting the tone for the game. It was able to used outside runs around the right end to move the ball at ease. By the end of the first half, Georgia was already leading 22 to 0. In the second half, Tech team played much better on defense, led by the play of its fullback, Maddox, and stopped Georgia on downs twice on the five yard line. Georgia was held without an offensive touchdown in the second half, but scored twice on blocked punts. Georgia Tech's best offensive player was its right halfback, Sullivan, but the team did not threaten to score. Georgia was victorious with a score of 0–33.

Following the game, Georgia Tech President Lyman Hall extended support of Coach Nalley in saying that the school authorities and students are satisfied with the coach and the team: "We are confident they play their very best game, and attribute severe drubbings to the irony of fate," he said.

Nashville Garnet and Blue (3–0–1) at Georgia Tech Techs (0–4–0)

Quarter	1	2	Total
Nashville	15	0	15
Georgia Tech	0	0	0

at Piedmont Park • Atlanta, Georgia

- Date: Saturday, November 11, 1899
- Game time: 3:00 p.m.
- Game attendance: "A fairly large crowd of enthusiasts"
- Referee: G. W. Rowbotham

This was the first meeting between the two schools. There was much excitement in the lead-up to the game as Nashville had not played in the area in the past and was a mystery to the locals. Nashville had already had a successful season, coming into the Tech game with a record of 3–1–0.

Nashville played a very fast game, which was effective against Tech's defense. Nashville scored three touchdowns in the first half. In the second half, Tech made significant adjustments and prevented any additional scoring. The Techs were able to make it five yards from Nashville's goal but were unable to score. Nashville won the game 15 to 0. Clark, Maddox, Sullivan, and Wooley were the best players for Tech.

Clemson Tigers (3–2–0) vs. Georgia Tech Techs (0–5–0)

Quarter	1	2	Total
Clemson (Note: The scoring for each half is not known.)	0	41	41
Georgia Tech	0	5	5

at Unknown field • Greenville, South Carolina

- Date: Thursday, December 1, 1899
- Game time: 12:24 p.m.
- Game attendance: "Good attendance"
- Referee: Unknown

Georgia Tech's final game of the season occurred against Clemson in Greenville, South Carolina, about thirty miles from Clemson's campus. The two teams had played one previous time, in 1898, which was a Clemson victory. The 1899 contest would be the last time the rivalry was played in South Carolina until 1974. Clemson had easy success against Georgia Tech, winning by a score of 41 to 5. Georgia Tech scored on a fumbled punt on the 15-yard-line, its first and only points of the year, but it did not threaten the Clemson endzone for the remainder of the game. Overall, Tech made a good impression even with the lopsided loss and took its defeat in good humor.

== Players ==
Georgia Tech Techs 1899 game starters
	Auburn	Atlanta	Sewanee	Georgia	Nashville	Clemson
Left End	Dean	Manly	Dean	Dean	Powell	
Left Tackle	Pete Wooley (C)	Pete Wooley (C)	Pete Wooley (C)	Pete Wooley (C)	Pete Wooley (C)	
Left Guard	Griffith	Griffith	Griffith	Griffith	Griffith	
Center	Cunningham	Cunningham	Cunningham	Cunningham	Cunningham	
Right Guard	Hudson	Hudson	Hudson	Hudson	Hudson	
Right Tackle	Wayne Holman	Wayne Holman	Wayne Holman	Wayne Holman	Wayne Holman	
Right End	Launey	Launey	Launey	Neal	Neal	
Quarterback	Saunders	Harris	Manly	Manley	Harris	
Left Halfback	Lee Clark	Lee Clark	Lee Clark	Lee Clark	George Merritt	
Right Halfback	Bertie Sullivan	Bertie Sullivan	Bertie Sullivan	Bertie Sullivan	Bertie Sullivan	
Fullback	George Merritt	George Merritt	George Merritt	Maddox	Maddox	
Substitutes	Kendrick • Owen • Stultz					

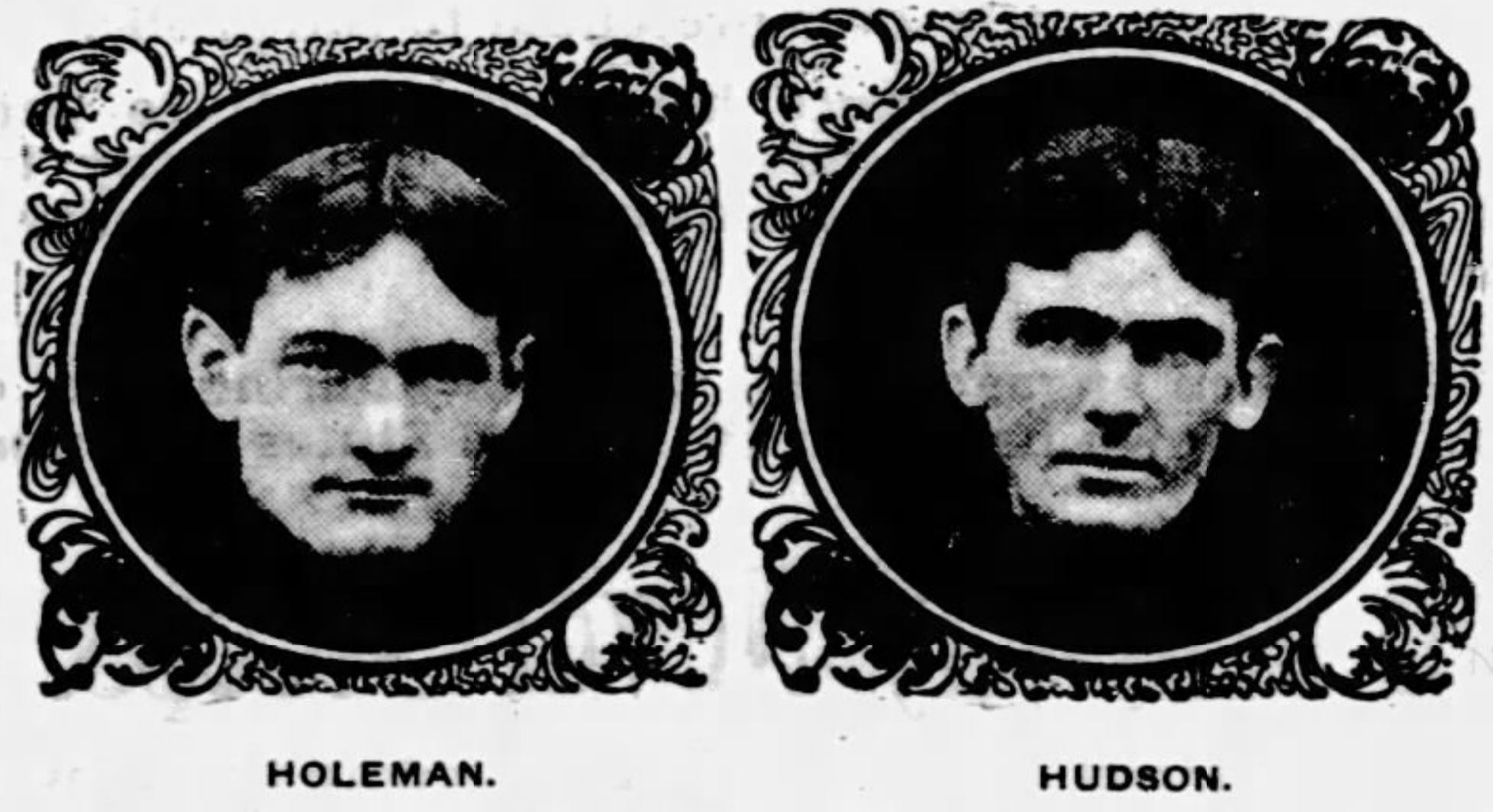
W. J. Holman and Hudson
