= 1899 Sewanee Tigers football team =

American college football season

1899 Sewanee Tigers football
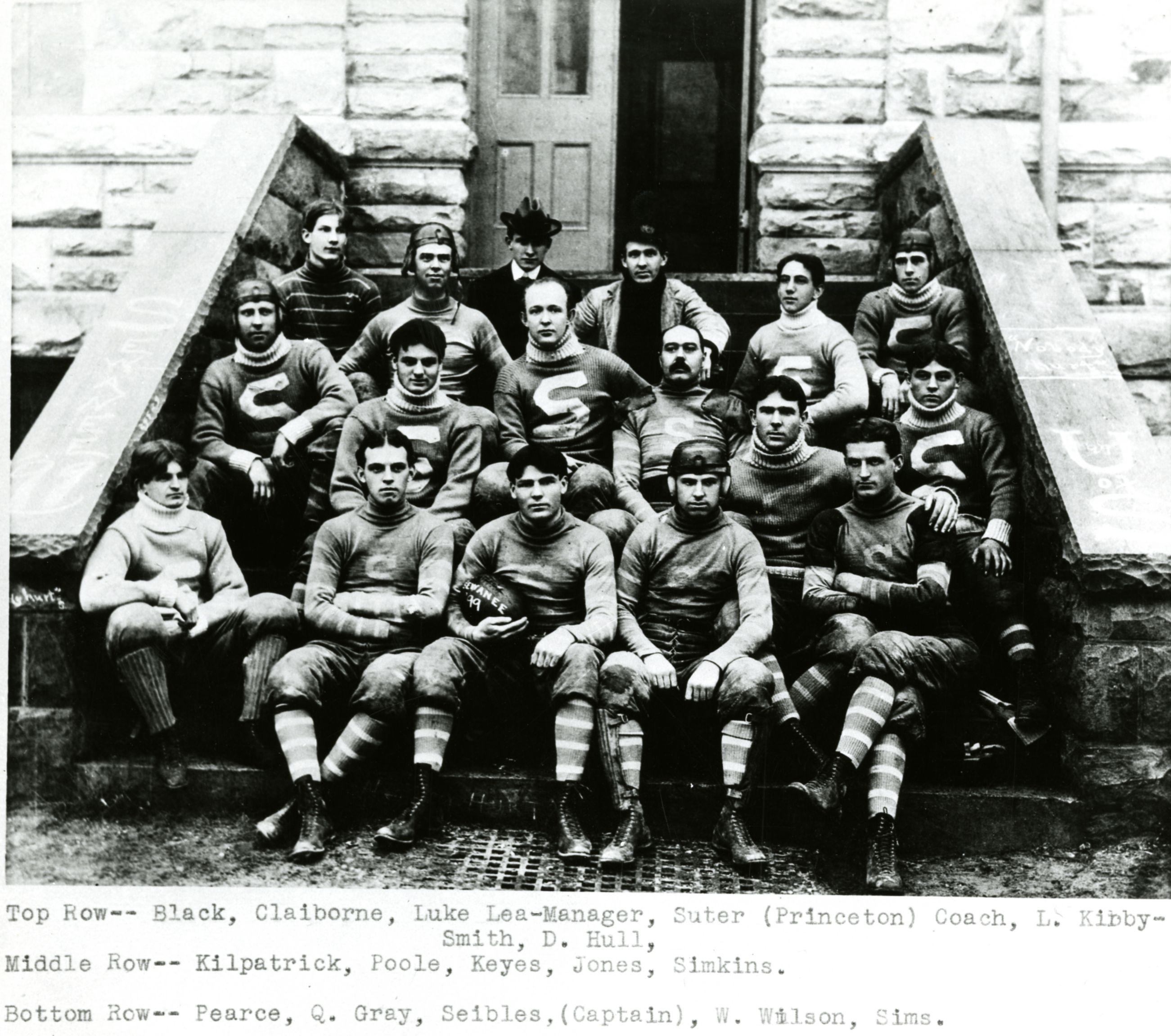

SIAA champion
- Conference: Southern Intercollegiate Athletic Association
- Record: 12–0 (11–0 SIAA)
- Head coach: Billy Suter (1st season)
- Captain: Henry Seibels
- Home stadium: Hardee Field

1899 Southern Intercollegiate Athletic Association football standings
	Conf.					Overall
Team	W		L		T	W		L		T
Sewanee $	11	–	0	–	0	12	–	0	–	0
Vanderbilt	5	–	0	–	0	7	–	2	–	0
Alabama	1	–	0	–	0	3	–	1	–	0
Nashville	4	–	1	–	0	4	–	1	–	1
Tennessee	2	–	1	–	0	6	–	2	–	0
Auburn	2	–	1	–	1	3	–	1	–	1
Texas	3	–	2	–	0	6	–	2	–	0
North Carolina	1	–	1	–	0	7	–	3	–	0
Ole Miss	3	–	4	–	0	3	–	4	–	0
Georgia	2	–	3	–	1	2	–	3	–	1
Clemson	1	–	2	–	0	4	–	2	–	0
Central (KY)	1	–	2	–	0	1	–	2	–	0
LSU	1	–	3	–	0	1	–	4	–	0
Kentucky State	0	–	1	–	0	5	–	2	–	2
SW Presbyterian	0	–	1	–	0	1	–	1	–	0
Cumberland (TN)	0	–	3	–	0	0	–	3	–	0
Georgia Tech	0	–	5	–	0	0	–	6	–	0
Tulane	0	–	5	–	0	0	–	6	–	1
$ – Conference champion

The 1899 Sewanee Tigers football team represented Sewanee: The University of the South in the 1899 Southern Intercollegiate Athletic Association football season. Sewanee was one of the first college football powers of the South and the 1899 team was one of its best. The 1899 Tigers won 12 games and lost none, outscored opponents 322–10, and won the Southern Intercollegiate Athletic Association (SIAA) title.

The team of 21 players was led by head coach Herman "Billy" Suter and future College Football Hall of Famer and captain Henry "Ditty" Seibels. The team also featured Ormond Simkins, (Note: Ormond was the son of William Stewart Simkins, who may have fired the first shot of the Civil War.) and the team's manager was future US Senator and newspaper publisher Luke Lea. The 11 extra points against Cumberland by Bart Sims is still a school record. John Heisman's Auburn team was the only team to score on Sewanee.

With just 18 players, the team known as the "Iron Men" embarked on a ten-day, 2,500 mile train trip, where they played five games in six days. Sewanee had five shutout wins over Texas (in Austin), Texas A&M (in Houston), Tulane (in New Orleans), LSU (in Baton Rouge), and Ole Miss (in Memphis). Sportswriter Grantland Rice called the group "the most durable football team I ever saw." The road trip is recalled memorably with the Biblical allusion "...and on the seventh day they rested."

== Before the season ==
Despite being from a small Episcopal university in the mountains of Tennessee, the Sewanee team came to dominate football in the region during the end of the 19th and early 20th centuries. (Note: The reasons for football's success at Sewanee included its status as one of the first teams in the region and the school session running through the summer, including a long winter break, which gave the team more practice compared to its opponents.) Like several other football powers of yore, Sewanee today emphasizes scholarship over athletics. (Note: There is little evidence today at Sewanee of the team's former success. The school does not have a large stadium and is part of NCAA Division III, which offers players no athletic scholarships. Although Sewanee was a charter member of the NCAA's Southeastern Conference when it was formed in 1932, the Tigers never won a game and withdrew from the conference in 1940.) The Sewanee Tigers today play in Division III, which does not allow for athletic scholarships.

Sewanee had seven starters return from the undefeated 1898 team. Before play started, the Sewanee men trained hard for several weeks under coach Suter. With experience and leadership, the team was hopeful for an undisputed southern championship.

The team also had a pair of African-American trainers or "rub down men", one whose name was Cal Burrows. They would rub the players after games and on the trains to lessen their pain and help the players to sleep. They also gathered the water from nearby Tremlett Springs. The mountain water was one reason given for Sewanee's superior athletics at the time.

== Schedule ==
After a disagreement with traditional rival Vanderbilt University over gate receipts resulting in the 1899 game being canceled, manager Luke Lea sought a way to make up for the lost revenue. To accomplish this he put together an ambitious schedule of five big name opponents in six days. Playing so many games in a short period minimized costs while maximizing revenue.

Date	Time	Opponent	Site	Result	Attendance	Source
October 21	1:00 p.m.	vs. Georgia	Piedmont Park; Atlanta, GA	W 12–0		
October 23	3:30 p.m.	at Georgia Tech	Piedmont Park; Atlanta, GA	W 32–0		
October 28		Tennessee	Hardee Field; Sewanee, TN	W 46–0		
November 3		Southwestern Presbyterian	Hardee Field; Sewanee, TN (rivalry)	W 54–0		
November 9	3:00 p.m.	at Texas	Varsity Athletic Field; Austin, TX	W 12–0	2,500	
November 10	3:30 p.m.	vs. Texas A&M*	Herald Park; Houston, TX	W 10–0	600	
November 11	4:00 p.m.	at Tulane	Tulane Athletic Field; New Orleans, LA	W 23–0	~1,000	
November 13		at LSU	State Field; Baton Rouge, LA	W 34–0	2,000+	
November 14	3:30 p.m.	vs. Ole Miss	Billings Park; Memphis, TN	W 12–0		
November 20		Cumberland (TN)	Hardee Field; Sewanee, TN	W 71–0		
November 25		at Nashville	Normal College Field; Nashville, TN	Canceled		
November 30	2:30 p.m.	vs. Auburn	Riverside Park; Montgomery, AL	W 11–10	4,000	
December 2	2:30 p.m.	vs. North Carolina	Piedmont Park; Atlanta, GA	W 5–0	2,000	
*Non-conference game; Source:

== Game summaries ==
=== Georgia ===
Sewanee at Georgia

Team	1	2	Total
• Sewanee	6	6	12
Georgia	0	0	0

- Date: October 21
- Location: Piedmont Park
  Atlanta, GA
- Game start: 1:00 p. m.

Fullback Ormond Simkins was the star of the 12–0 opening win over the Georgia Bulldogs, netting the first touchdown with a fine line buck of 12 yards through center "amidst thunderous applause". Halfback Rex Kilpatrick scored a second touchdown on a 4-yard run.

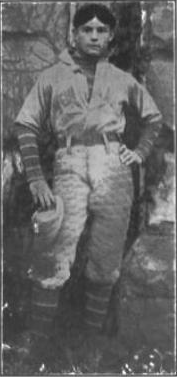
Ormond Simkins

The starting lineup was: Sims (left end), Jones (left tackle), Keyes (left guard), Poole (center), Claiborne (right guard), Bolling (right tackle), Pearce (right end), Wilson (quarterback), Kilpatrick (left halfback), Seibels (right halfback), and Simkins (fullback).

=== Georgia Tech ===
Sewanee at Georgia Tech

Team	1	2	Total
• Sewanee	27	5	32
Ga. Tech	0	0	0

- Date: October 23
- Location: Piedmont Park
  Atlanta, GA
- Game start: 3:30 p. m.
- Referee: Rowbotham

Sewanee followed the defeat of Georgia with a 32–0 victory over Georgia Tech on the following Monday. Sewanee won easily, the first score coming soon after the kickoff on a blocked kick recovered by halfback Quintard Gray. Gray scored the next touchdown on a 25-yard end run. Just fifteen minutes had passed when halfback and captain Ditty Seibels scored the third touchdown. The next three touchdowns were also scored by Seibels, including pretty runs of 35 and 40 yards. He had one long scoring run called back due to a penalty. The team played its substitutes in the second half.

The starting lineup was: Sims (left end), Jones (left tackle), Keyes (left guard), Poole (center), Claiborne (right guard), Bolling (right tackle), Pearce (right end), Wilson (quarterback), Gray (left halfback), Seibels (right halfback), and Simkins (fullback).

=== Tennessee ===
Tennessee vs. Sewanee

Team	1	2	Total
Tennessee	0	0	0
• Sewanee	29	17	46

- Date: October 28
- Location: McGee Field
  Sewanee, TN

In a driving rain at McGee Field, "where each 5-yard line was a miniature stream", Sewanee beat the Tennessee Volunteers 46–0. Ditty Seibels led the scoring with three touchdowns. "Touchdown followed touchdown, until Sewanee finally stopped scoring from sheer exhaustion" to quote The Sewanee Purple.

The starting lineup was: Sims (left end), Jones (left tackle), Keyes (left guard), Poole (center), Claiborne (right guard), K. Smith (right tackle), Pearce (right end), Wilson (quarterback), Kilpatrick (left halfback), Seibels (right halfback), and Simkins (fullback).

=== Southwestern Presbyterian ===
SW Presbyterian vs. Sewanee

Team	1	2	Total
SW Presbyterian	0	0	0
• Sewanee	32	22	54

- Date: November 3
- Location: McGee Field
  Sewanee, TN
- Referee: Elsom

Sewanee next defeated Southwestern Presbyterian (now Rhodes College) 54–0. The Sewanee Purple wrote: "Never before in the history of football at Sewanee have we piled up such a score against an opponent." That would change several weeks later when they played Cumberland.

The starting lineup was: Sims (left end), Jones (left tackle), Keyes (left guard), Poole (center), Claiborne (right guard), Bolling (right tackle), Pearce (right end), Wilson (quarterback), Gray (left halfback), Seibels (right halfback), and Simkins (fullback).

=== The Road trip: 5 shutouts in 6 days ===
The 1899 Iron Men team's most notable accomplishment was a six-day period from November 9 to 14 which is arguably the greatest road trip in college football history. With 18 players, Lea, Suter, and the trainers left Sewanee on November 6.

During this road trip, Sewanee outscored its opponents for a combined 91–0, including Texas, Texas A&M, LSU, and Ole Miss. Sewanee defeated each one, traveling by train for some 2,500 miles. This feat, barring fundamental changes in modern-day football, can never be equaled. Contemporary sources called the road trip the most remarkable ever made by an American college team.

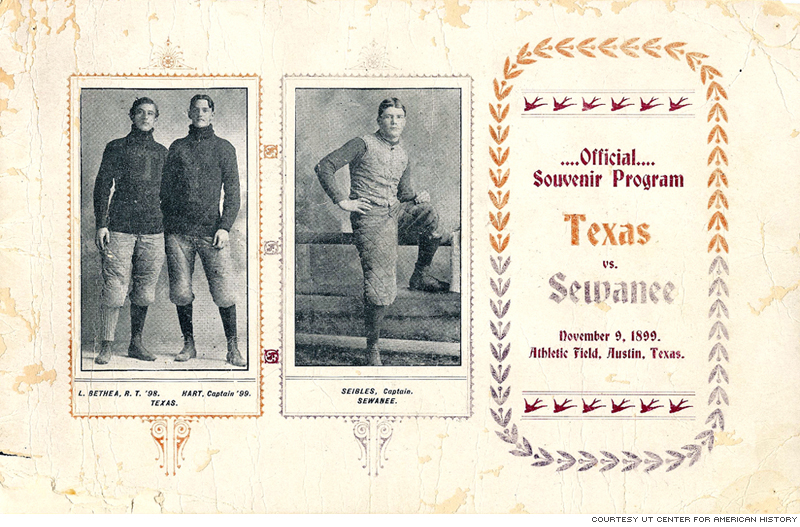
Program from the Texas game.

==== Texas ====
Sewanee at Texas

Team	1	2	Total
• Sewanee	6	6	12
Texas	0	0	0

- Date: November 9
- Location: Athletic Field
  Austin, Texas
- Game attendance: 2,500

After leaving the Cowan train station, manager Lea discovered they had left all the cleats at the train station. Without alerting the team of the problem, Lea cleverly arranged for them to be shipped on later trains to arrive in time for the Texas game. He had to wire an alumnus in Nashville to meet the first train, and transfer the cleats to another train in the middle of the night.

The train carrying the players pulled into Austin on the night of the 8th to face the undefeated Texas Longhorns the following afternoon. Sewanee won 12–0. They scored five minutes into the first quarter, and a minute before the end of the game, "and the intervening time was devoted to the liveliest battle ever witnessed here". Ditty Seibels played throughout the game, scoring both touchdowns, despite having his head "split open just above the left eye, and he bled profusely." He had his wound patched by plaster and he stayed in the game. By the end of the game his head was coated with blood.

The starting lineup was: Sims (left end), Jones (left tackle), Keyes (left guard), Poole (center), Claiborne (right guard), Bolling (right tackle), Pearce (right end), Wilson (quarterback), Kilpatrick (left halfback), Seibels (right halfback), and Simkins (fullback).

==== Texas A&M ====
Sewanee at Texas A&M

Team	1	2	Total
• Sewanee	5	5	10
Texas A&M	0	0	0

- Date: November 10
- Location: Herald Park
  Houston, Texas
- Game attendance: 600
- Referee: Killerin (Georgia)

Not 20 hours had passed since the Texas game before the Tigers faced the Texas A&M Aggies. The Tigers won 10–0. Guard "Wild Bill" Claiborne was blind in one eye, and used his discolored eye for purposes of intimidation by lifting his eye patch, goggling his eye around and saying, "This happened in the last game," leaving his opponent to worry about that. Ormond Simkins first ran in a touchdown from the 1-yard-line near the end of the first half. He also saved a touchdown with a crushing tackle of the A&M running back. Texas A&M's campus paper, the Battalion, reported :..."(the Sewanee Tigers) are unmistakably the champions of the South this year..."

The starting lineup was: Sims (left end), Jones (left tackle), Keyes (left guard), Poole (center), Claiborne (right guard), Bolling (right tackle), Pearce (right end), Wilson (quarterback), Kilpatrick (left halfback), Gray (right halfback), and Simkins (fullback).

==== Tulane ====
Sewanee at Tulane

Team	1	2	Total
• Sewanee	17	6	23
Tulane	0	0	0

- Date: November 11
- Location: New Orleans, LA
- Game start: 4:00 p. m.
- Game attendance: ~1,000
- Referee: E. L. Simonds

After another 350-mile overnight train leg, the Tigers beat Tulane in New Orleans 23–0. Rex Kilpatrick scored first. Quintard Gray scored twice more. The lone score of the second half was another, 5-yard run by Kilpatrick. The game was called early due to darkness.

The starting lineup was: Sims (left end), Jones (left tackle), Keyes (left guard), Poole (center), Claiborne (right guard), Bolling (right tackle), Pearce (right end), Wilson (quarterback), Kilpatrick (left halfback), Seibels (right halfback), and Simkins (fullback).

The team went to see a play on Saturday night in New Orleans. One of the characters was dressed in purple, which was Sewanee's color, and the team rose up and gave the Sewanee cheer that aroused the whole audience.

==== LSU ====
Sewanee at LSU

Team	1	2	Total
• Sewanee	17	17	34
LSU	0	0	0

- Date: November 13
- Location: State Field
  Baton Rouge, LA
- Game attendance: 2,000+

On Sunday, before the trip to Baton Rouge, the Sewanee team toured a sugar plantation owned by John Dalton Shaffer One source reported center William H. Poole "drank heavily" on the one day off. Sewanee then defeated LSU 34–0.

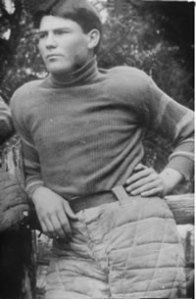
Captain Seibels

Ditty Seibels scored first. Sewanee's next run from scrimmage was another Seibels touchdown; this time a 65-yard run. Rex Kilpatrick had one score, and Sewanee managed three further touchdowns. One account reads: "In spite of their long, tiresome trip, the Sewanee men were lively as school boys out for a day off." The Sewanee players enjoyed the grass field in Baton Rouge after playing on their rocky home field.

The starting lineup was: Sims (left end), Jones (left tackle), Keyes (left guard), Poole (center), Claiborne (right guard), Bolling (right tackle), Pearce (right end), Wilson (quarterback), Kilpatrick (left halfback), Gray (right halfback), and Simkins (fullback).

==== Ole Miss ====
Sewanee vs. Ole Miss

Team	1	2	Total
• Sewanee	6	6	12
Miss	0	0	0

- Date: November 14
- Location: Billings Park
  Memphis, TN

The Tigers arrived in Memphis to play Ole Miss on their third pre-game overnight train ride in five days. At the beginning of the game, Ole Miss objected to some Sewanee players wearing their meagre leather helmets, but the referee overruled their objection. Ole Miss kept the game close. Ditty Seibels scored the first touchdown with fifteen seconds left in the first half, and Kilpatrick scored the second with thirteen to go before the final whistle. The game was attended by "several hundred spectators".

The local Commercial Appeal praised the Tigers: "Yesterday's score against (Mississippi) marked the two hundred and fortieth point for which the Tennesseans have scored to nothing for their opponents, during the present season. The trip of the Sewanee eleven, along with record, will probably remain unequaled for generations."

The road trip is recalled memorably with the Biblical allusion "...and on the seventh day they rested." (Note: cf. Genesis 2:2) But the fact is, they didn't rest. They had three more games to play, including two of the toughest teams in the South, Auburn and North Carolina.

=== Cumberland ===
Cumberland vs. Sewanee

Team	1	2	Total
Cumberland	0	0	0
• Sewanee	47	24	71

- Date: November 20
- Location: McGee Field
  Sewanee, TN

Seemingly unfazed by the travel, the following week the Tigers crushed the Cumberland Bulldogs, 71–0. One account reads: "For five minutes after the beginning of the game Cumberland made some good gains, but the Sewanee defense suddenly grew strong, the ball was secured on downs, and Seibels crossed the line for touchdown seven minutes after play began." Bart Sims had a school record 11 extra points, and Ormond Simkins rested instead of playing.

The starting lineup was: Sims (left end), Jones (left tackle), Keyes (left guard), Poole (center), Claiborne (right guard), Bolling (right tackle), Pearce (right end), Wilson (quarterback), Kilpatrick (left halfback), Seibels (right halfback), and Brooks (fullback)

=== Auburn: The only points scored ===
Sewanee at Auburn

Team	1	2	Total
• Sewanee	11	0	11
Auburn	10	0	10

- Date: November 30
- Location: Riverside Park
  Montgomery, AL
- Game start: 2:50 p. m.
- Game attendance: 4,000
- Referee: Martin

On Thanksgiving Day in Montgomery, Sewanee faced John Heisman's Auburn team winning the contest by a narrow margin of 11–10. There were 4,000 people at the game, and there were fist fights, and even guns drawn.

Auburn was the only team to score on Sewanee all year, running a fast offense, and played exceptionally well on defense. Auburn would lock arms to form a wedge for the ball carrier, so Suter told his ends to go at their legs, cleats first. Auburn also had leather handles sewn on their pants to give their blockers and runners an extra advantage, and Sewanee requested that the referees require them to be cut off, which the referees did.

After being held on downs at the 10-yard line, Auburn again drove down the field and scored first when Bivins ran in a touchdown. Ed Huguley followed this up with another 50-yard touchdown run, but the referee disallowed it. (Note: He had called back a prior touchdown before Bivins scored.)

Sewanee responded when Rex Kilpatrick ran outside the tackle for a 10-yard touchdown. Auburn back Arthur Feagin, with Huguley's interference, scored to make it 10 to 5 in favor of Auburn.

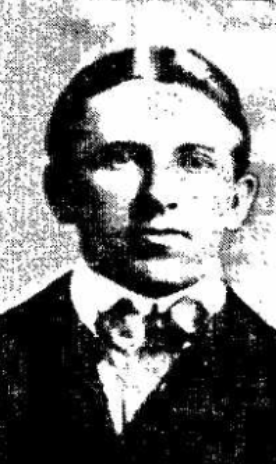
Coach Suter

A controversial fumble recovery by Sewanee may have saved the game. Auburn quarterback Reynolds Tichenor said it was a gift; the referee awarded Sewanee the ball, but he insisted Auburn recovered it. A double pass play to Warbler Wilson got the ensuing Sewanee touchdown. Bart Sims made the extra point to edge Auburn. Neither team managed to score in the second half. The delay from the crowd gathering on the field ran the game into darkness. The referee called the game for darkness with only 14 minutes gone in the second half.

Sportswriter Fuzzy Woodruff, a witness to the game, wrote:

Under Heisman's tutelage, Auburn played with a marvelous speed and dash that couldn't be gainsaid and which fairly swept Sewanee off its feet. Only the remarkable punting of Simkins kept the game from being a debacle. I recall vividly one incident of the game, which demonstrates clearly just how surprising was Sewanee's victory.

The Purple was taking time out...A Sewanee player was down, his head being bathed...Suter, the Sewanee coach, and Heisman, the Auburn mentory, were walking up and down the field together. They approached this boy...Suter, evidently as mad as fire, asked the down and out player 'Are you fellows going to be run over like this all afternoon?'

'Coach,' said the boy, lifting his tired head from the ground, 'we just can't stand this stuff. We've never seen anything like it.'

Suter and Heisman turned away. 'Can you beat that?' Suter asked the Auburn coach. Heisman didn't say anything, I guess he thought a great deal. He told me afterwards that he had never felt so sorry for a man on a football field as he had for Suter at that moment.

The starting lineup was: Pierce (left end), Jones (left tackle), Claiborne (left guard), Poole (center), Keyes (right guard), Bolling (right tackle), Sims (right end), Wilson (quarterback), Kilpatrick (left halfback), Seibels (right halfback), and Simkins (fullback).

=== North Carolina ===
Sewanee vs. North Carolina

Team	1	2	Total
• Sewanee	5	0	5
North Carolina	0	0	0

- Date: December 2
- Location: Atlanta, GA
- Game attendance: 2,000
- Referee: Taylor (Yale)

The season closed with a 5 to 0 victory over the North Carolina Tar Heels and the championship of the south. Sewanee's defense was strong, including a goal line stand, and Seibels' punting gained 10 yards on each exchange of punts. A single free kick from placement by Kilpatrick proved the difference.

Simkins had signaled for a fair catch, but North Carolina's Frank M. Osborne collided with him. Sewanee was awarded fifteen yards and the free kick. The star for the Tar Heels that day was Herman Koehler.

The starting lineup was: Simkins (left end), Jones (left tackle), Keyes (left guard), Poole (center), Claiborne (right guard), Bolling (right tackle), Black (right end), Wilson (quarterback), Kilpatrick (left halfback), Seibels (right halfback), and Hull (fullback).

== Postseason ==
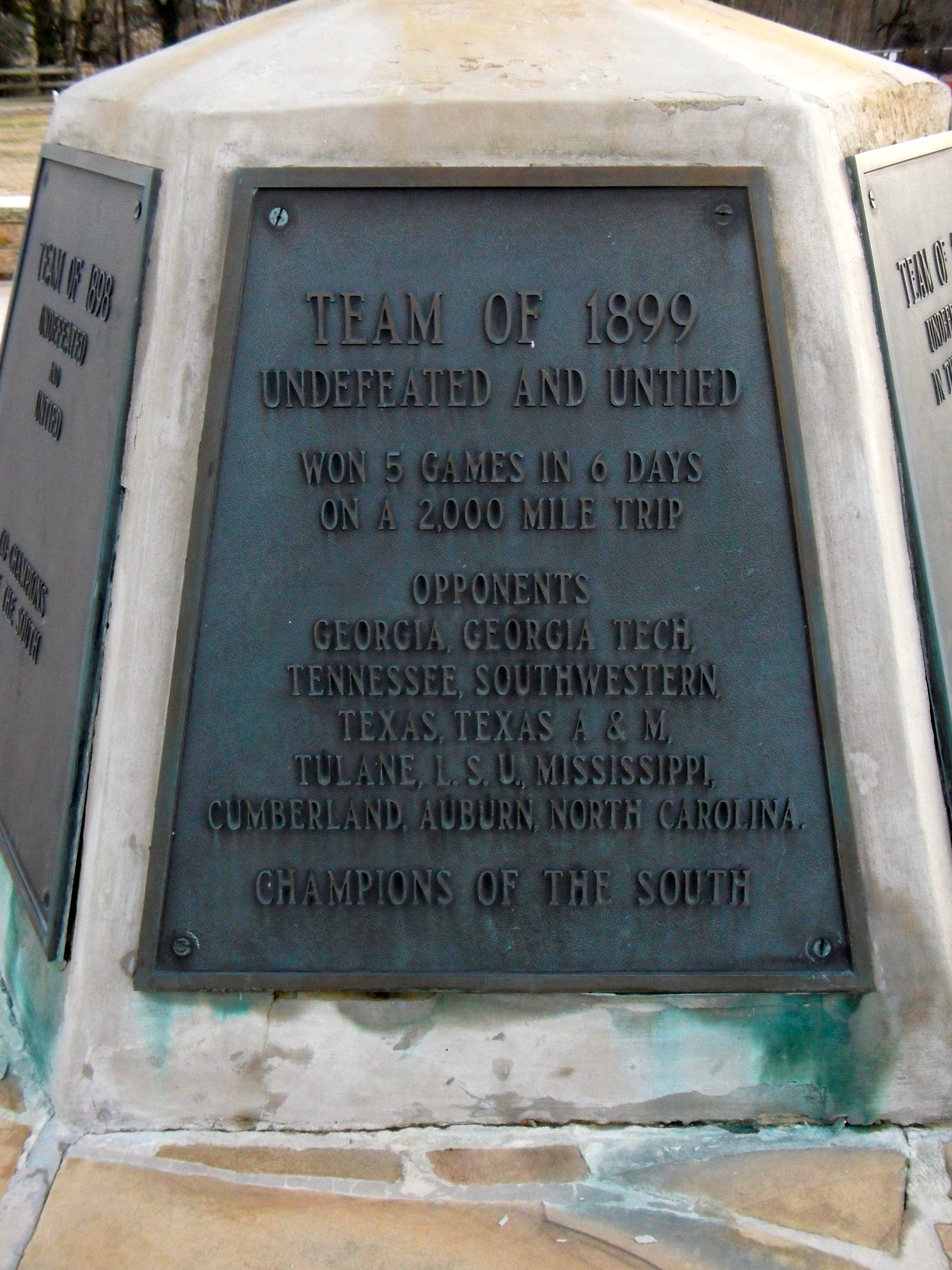
Commemorative plaque on the base of the flagpole at McGee Field.

=== Awards and honors ===
W. A. Lambeth of Virginia in the journal Outing and Coach Suter both posted All-Southern teams. (Note: The Vanderbilt Hustler remarked on Suter's selection of 9 of his own players, "Only nine! He surely must have been thinking of a baseball team".) Included on Suter's All-Southern were: Richard Bolling, Wild Bill Claiborne, Deacon Jones, Rex Kilpatrick, William H. Poole, Ditty Seibels, Ormond Simkins, and Warbler Wilson. Wilson was also selected All-Southern by Lambeth. Bart Sims made Lambeth's team and was a substitute for Suter.

=== Legacy ===
By the end of the season, eleven of Sewanee's victories were against SIAA conference rivals, setting the record for the most conference games won in a single season by any team before or since. (Note: The 2020 Alabama Crimson Tide did tie it 121 years later with an 11–0 conference record with an all-SEC regular-season schedule adjusted to deal with the COVID pandemic.) On College Gameday, November 13, 1999, ESPN featured the University of the South with a four-minute segment on the 1899 football team, and CSX Railroad provided a short train ride in Cowan, which was a re-enactment of an early leg of the Sewanee to Texas train ride.

Several writers and sports personalities consider this Sewanee team one of the greatest football teams ever to play. Sportswriter Grantland Rice called the group "the most durable football team I ever saw." Former Penn State coach Joe Paterno once said: "While there are some who would swear to the contrary, I did not see the 1899 Sewanee football team play in person. Winning five road games in six days, all by shutout scores, has to be one of the most staggering achievements in the history of the sport. If the Bowl Championship Series (BCS) had been in effect in 1899, there seems little doubt Sewanee would have played in the title game. And they wouldn’t have been done in by any computer ratings." Tony Barnhart in Southern Fried Football: The History, Passion and Glory of the Great Southern Game listed Sewanee as his number 1 Southern football team of all-time. A 16-team playoff to determine the best team in college football history with winners decided by fan votes was run by the College Football Hall of Fame, called the March of the Gridiron Champions. Sewanee, starting at the lowest seed, won the tournament. (Note: Sewanee beat such teams as the 1971 Nebraska Cornhuskers and 1961 Alabama Crimson Tide.)

In 2022, a documentary film about the team was released. Called Unrivaled the film chronicles the team and its season. In 2023, David Neil Drews published a book titled Iron Tigers: A novel inspired by the team that conquered Dixie and launched Southern football.

== Personnel ==
=== Varsity lettermen ===
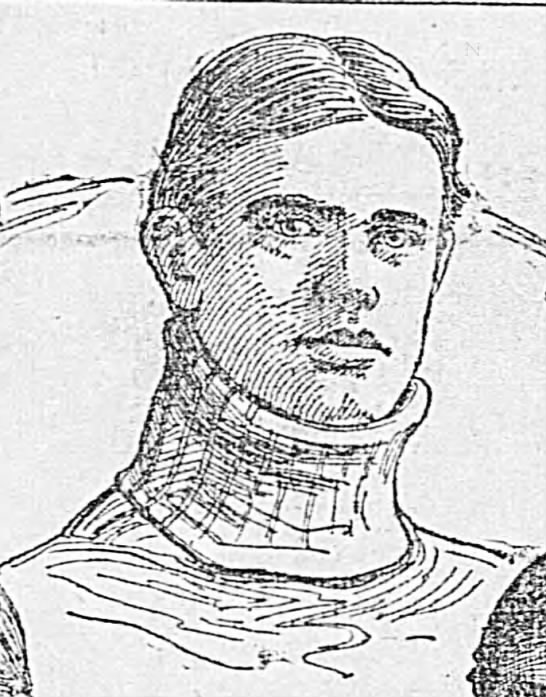
Wild Bill Claiborne

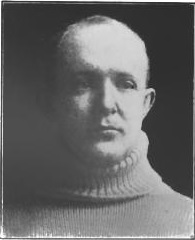
William H. Poole

==== Line ====
Player	Position	Games started	Hometown	Prep school	Height	Weight	Age
Richard E. Bolling	tackle	10	Edna, Texas		5'10"		
William "Wild Bill" Claiborne	guard	11	Amherst Co., Virginia	Roanoke College	6'0"	190	
John William "Deacon" Jones	tackle	11	Marshall, Texas				
Henry S. Keyes	guard	10	Cambridge, Massachusetts				
Hugh Miller Thompson "Bunny" Pearce	end	9	Jackson, Mississippi		5'3"	125	
William H. Poole	center	10	Glyndon, Maryland		6'0"	185	19
Bartlet Et Ultimus "The Caboose" Sims	end	10	Bryan, Texas		6'0"	185	21

==== Backfield ====
Player	Position	Games started	Hometown	Prep school	Height	Weight	Age
Charles Quintard Gray	halfback	4	Ocala, Florida				
Ringland F. "Rex" Kilpatrick	halfback	9	Bridgeport, Alabama		6'1"	185	18
Henry "Ditty" Seibels	halfback	9	Montgomery, Alabama		5'10"	170	23
Ormond Simkins	fullback	10	Corsicana, Texas		5'10"	163	20
William "Warbler" Wilson	quarterback	11	Rock Hill, South Carolina		5'10"	154	22

==== Substitutes ====
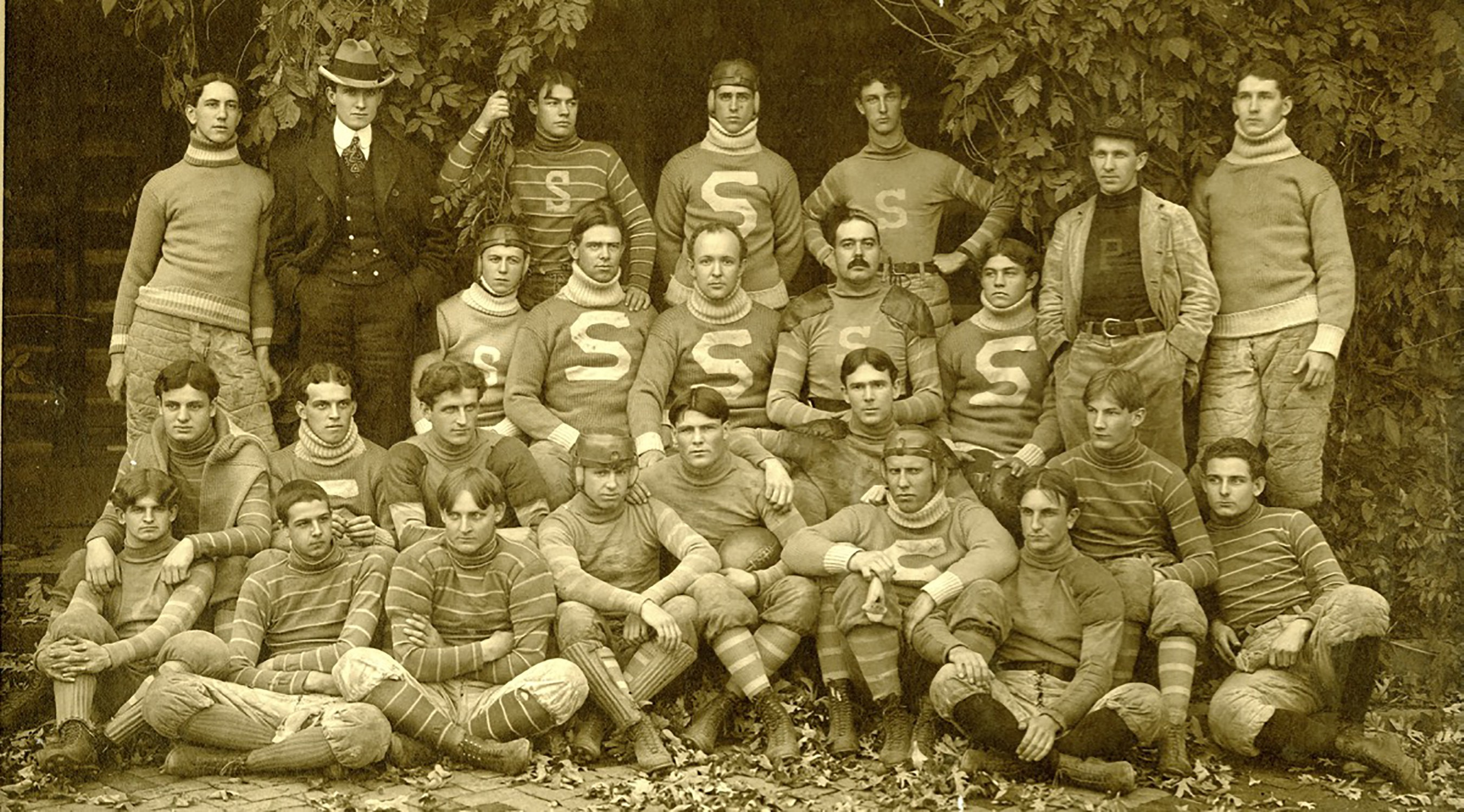
Another image of the Iron Men.

Player	Position	Games started	Hometown	Prep school	Height	Weight	Age
Ralph Peters Black	end	1	Atlanta, Georgia		6'0"	158	
Preston S. Brooks	back	1	Sewanee, Tennessee				
Harris G. Cope	quarterback		Savannah, Georgia	Taft School		117	16
Albert T. Davidson			Augusta, Georgia				
Andrew C. Evins			Spartanburg, South Carolina				
Daniel B. Hull	fullback	1	Savannah, Georgia		5'10"	160	
Joseph Lee Kirby-Smith	tackle	1	Sewanee, Tennessee			156	17
Landon R. Mason			Marshall, Virginia				
Floy H. Parker			Canton, Mississippi				
Herbert E. Smith

=== Coaching staff ===
- Head coach: Billy Suter
- Manager: Luke Lea
- Trainer: Cal Burrows

=== Scoring leaders ===
The following is an incomplete list of statistics and scores, largely dependent on newspaper summaries.

Player	Touchdowns	Extra points	Field goals	Points
Henry Seibels	18	0	0	90
Rex Kilpatrick	11	0	1	60
Warbler Wilson	8	0	0	40
Quintard Gray	6	0	0	30
Daniel Hull	4	0	0	20
Ormond Simkins	2	10	0	20
Bart Sims	0	18	0	18
Bunny Pearce	1	9	0	14
Deacon Jones	2	0	0	10
Richard Bolling	1	0	0	5
Unaccounted for v. LSU	3	0	0	15
Total	56	37	1	322

== See also ==
- 1899 College Football All-Southern Team
- List of undefeated NCAA Division I football teams

== Books ==
- Barnhart, Tony (2008). Southern Fried Football: The History, Passion and Glory of the Great Southern Game. Triumph Books. ISBN 9781623684884.
- Drews, David (2023). Iron Tigers: A novel Inspired by the team that conquered Dixie and launched Southern football. Harb and Russell Media. ISBN 979-8-9881718-0-5
- Givens, Wendell (2003). Ninety-Nine Iron: The Season Sewanee Won Five Games in Six Days. Fire Ant Books. ISBN 0-8173-5062-4.
- Scott, Richard (2008). SEC Football: 75 Years of Pride and Passion. MVP Books. ISBN 9781616731335.
- Walsh, Christopher J. (2007). Who's #1?. Simon and Schuster. ISBN 9781461734765.
- Woodruff, Fuzzy (1928). A History of Southern Football 1890–1928. Vol. 1.
