= Rex Kilpatrick =

American football player, builder, and banker (1881–1955)

Profile
- Position: Halfback

Personal information
- Born: December 26, 1881; Bridgeport, Alabama, U.S.
- Died: November, 1955; Spring Lake, New Jersey, U.S.
- Listed height: 6 ft 1 in (1.85 m)
- Listed weight: 185 lb (84 kg)

Career information
- College: Sewanee (1897–1900)

Awards and highlights
- SIAA championship (1898, 1899); All-Southern (1899)

Ringland Fisher "Rex" Kilpatrick (December 26, 1881 – November, 1955) was a college football player; later a builder and investment banker in the New York area. He was the younger brother of John Kilpatrick. He was one of the principal owners of the Tennessee River Coal Co.

== Career ==
His father moved from New York to Bridgeport because of investment potential in real estate and mining.

=== Football ===
Kilpatrick was a prominent running back for the Sewanee Tigers of Sewanee: The University of the South from 1897 to 1900. He was one of the team's heavier players.

==== 1899 ====
He was a member of the 1899 "Iron Men" who won 5 games in 6 days and an undefeated conference championship. This was his best year; He kicked the field goal to defeat North Carolina for the title. Kilpatrick was selected All-Southern. A documentary film about the team and Kilpatrick's role was released in 2022 called "Unrivaled: Sewanee1899."

== See also ==
- 1899 College Football All-Southern Team
