= 1899 LSU Tigers football team =

American college football season

1899 LSU Tigers football
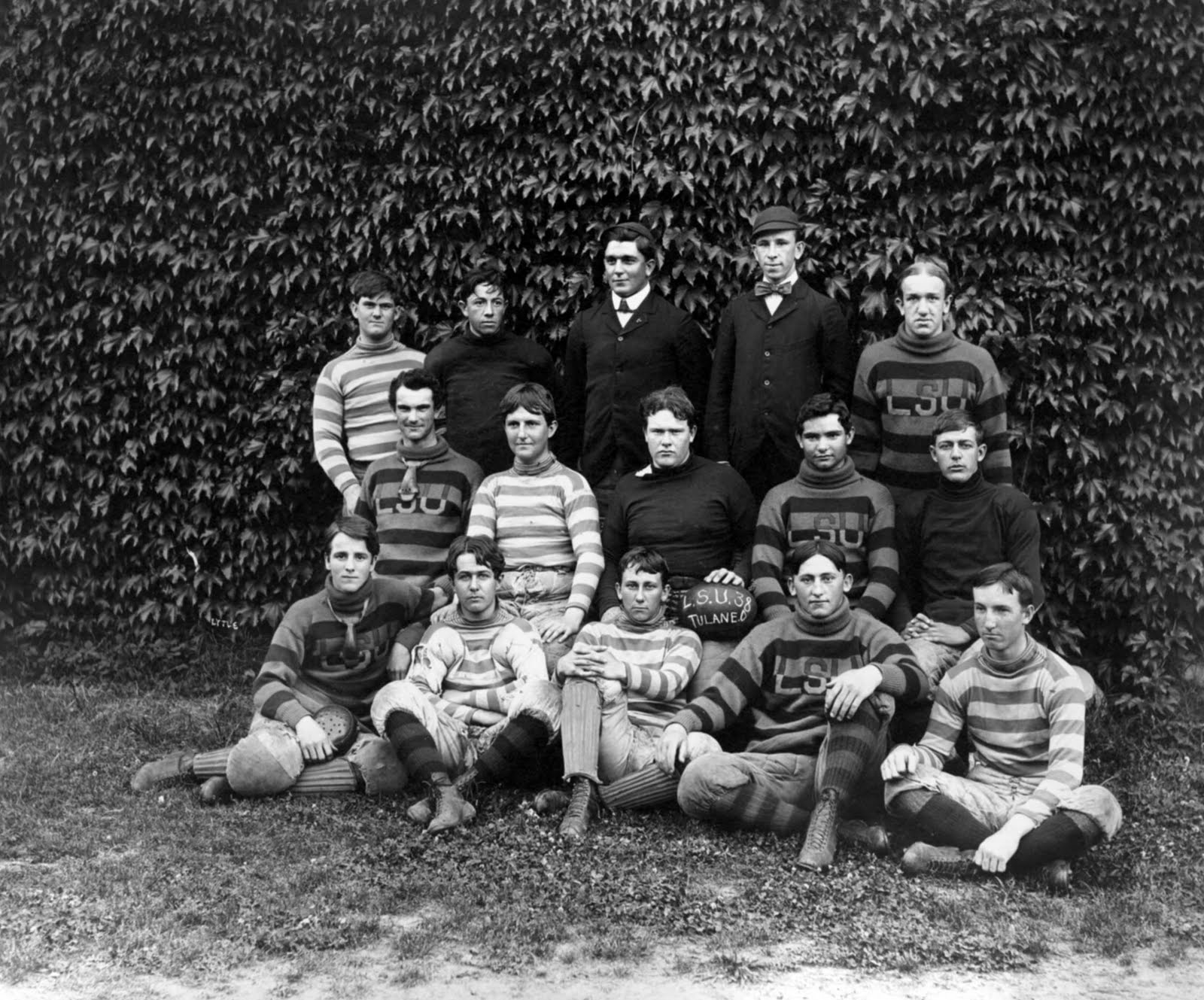
- Conference: Southern Intercollegiate Athletic Association
- Record: 1–4 (1–3 SIAA)
- Head coach: John P. Gregg (1st season)
- Captain: Hulette F. Aby
- Home stadium: State Field

1899 Southern Intercollegiate Athletic Association football standings
	Conf.					Overall
Team	W		L		T	W		L		T
Sewanee $	11	–	0	–	0	12	–	0	–	0
Vanderbilt	5	–	0	–	0	7	–	2	–	0
Alabama	1	–	0	–	0	3	–	1	–	0
Nashville	4	–	1	–	0	4	–	1	–	1
Tennessee	2	–	1	–	0	6	–	2	–	0
Auburn	2	–	1	–	1	3	–	1	–	1
Texas	3	–	2	–	0	6	–	2	–	0
North Carolina	1	–	1	–	0	7	–	3	–	0
Ole Miss	3	–	4	–	0	3	–	4	–	0
Georgia	2	–	3	–	1	2	–	3	–	1
Clemson	1	–	2	–	0	4	–	2	–	0
Central (KY)	1	–	2	–	0	1	–	2	–	0
LSU	1	–	3	–	0	1	–	4	–	0
Kentucky State	0	–	1	–	0	5	–	2	–	2
SW Presbyterian	0	–	1	–	0	1	–	1	–	0
Cumberland (TN)	0	–	3	–	0	0	–	3	–	0
Georgia Tech	0	–	5	–	0	0	–	6	–	0
Tulane	0	–	5	–	0	0	–	6	–	1
$ – Conference champion

The 1899 LSU Tigers football team represented the LSU Tigers of Louisiana State University during the 1899 Southern Intercollegiate Athletic Association football season. New coach John P. Gregg led the Tigers to a 1–4 season. The only wins were in an exhibition game against a high school team (which LSU does not officially record as a win) and against rival, Tulane. It was the first year of play for LSU's second five-year letterman, John J. Coleman (1899, 1900, 1901, 1902, 1903).

== Schedule ==
Date	Opponent	Site	Result	Attendance	Source
November 1	vs. Ole Miss	Fair grounds; Meridian, MS (rivalry)	L 0–11	5,000	
November 13	Sewanee	State Field; Baton Rouge, LA	L 0–34		
November 28	at Lake Charles High School*	Hoohoo Park; Lake Charles, LA	W 48–0		
November 30	at Texas	Varsity Athletic Field; Austin, TX	L 0–29		
December 2	at Texas A&M*	College Station, TX (rivalry)	L 0–52		
December 8	Tulane	State Field; Baton Rouge, LA (rivalry)	W 38–0		
*Non-conference game

== Roster ==
No.	Player	Position	Height	Weight	Hometown	High School
-	Hulette F. "Red" Aby	Tackle	-	-	Natchez, MS	-
-	Edward R. Barrow	-	-	-	Baton Rouge, LA	-
-	William Benjamin Chamberlin	-	-	-	DeVall, LA	-
-	Edmond Auguste M. Chavanne	Center	-	-	Lake Charles, LA	-
-	John J. Coleman	Halfback	-	-	New Orleans, LA	-
-	George Fuchs	Guard	-	-	New Orleans, LA	-
-	Edwin S. Gorham	End	-	-	Lake Charles, LA	-
-	Field V. Gremillion	Tackle	-	-	Alexandria, LA	-
-	Joseph O. Herpin	End	-	-	Lafayette, LA	-
-	Henry E. Landry	Fullback	-	-	Garyville, LA	-
-	Charles M. Lawrason	End	-	-	St. Francisville, LA	-
-	Hampton T. Lemoine	-	-	-	Marksville, LA	-
-	George B. LeSueur	-	-	-	Baton Rouge, LA	-
-	George K. Pratt	Tackle	-	-	New Orleans, LA	-
-	Ivan H. Schwing	Quarterback	-	-	Lake Charles, LA	-
-	John T. Stanford	-	-	-	Baton Rouge, LA	-
-	Benjamin B. Wall	Halfback	-	-	Alexandria, LA	-

Roster from Fanbase.com and LSU: The Louisiana Tigers
