= 1899 Vanderbilt Commodores football team =

American college football season

1899 Vanderbilt Commodores football
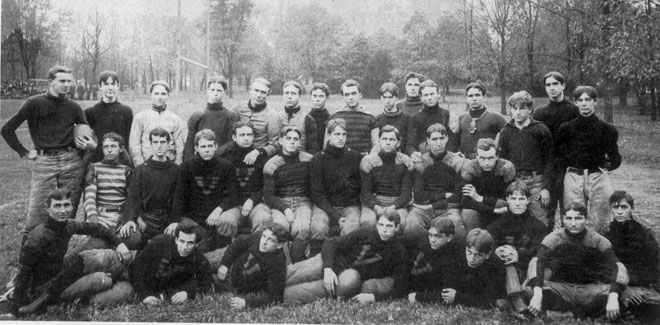
- Conference: Southern Intercollegiate Athletic Association
- Record: 7–2 (5–0 SIAA)
- Head coach: James L. Crane (1st season)
- Captain: Walter H. Simmons
- Home stadium: Dudley Field

1899 Southern Intercollegiate Athletic Association football standings
	Conf.					Overall
Team	W		L		T	W		L		T
Sewanee $	11	–	0	–	0	12	–	0	–	0
Vanderbilt	5	–	0	–	0	7	–	2	–	0
Alabama	1	–	0	–	0	3	–	1	–	0
Nashville	4	–	1	–	0	4	–	1	–	1
Tennessee	2	–	1	–	0	6	–	2	–	0
Auburn	2	–	1	–	1	3	–	1	–	1
Texas	3	–	2	–	0	6	–	2	–	0
North Carolina	1	–	1	–	0	7	–	3	–	0
Ole Miss	3	–	4	–	0	3	–	4	–	0
Georgia	2	–	3	–	1	2	–	3	–	1
Clemson	1	–	2	–	0	4	–	2	–	0
Central (KY)	1	–	2	–	0	1	–	2	–	0
LSU	1	–	3	–	0	1	–	4	–	0
Kentucky State	0	–	1	–	0	5	–	2	–	2
SW Presbyterian	0	–	1	–	0	1	–	1	–	0
Cumberland (TN)	0	–	3	–	0	0	–	3	–	0
Georgia Tech	0	–	5	–	0	0	–	6	–	0
Tulane	0	–	5	–	0	0	–	6	–	1
$ – Conference champion

The 1899 Vanderbilt Commodores football team represented Vanderbilt University during the 1899 Southern Intercollegiate Athletic Association football season. The Commodores were coached by James L. Crane, in his first year as head coach. Quarterback Frank Godchaux Sr., the father of Frank Godchaux, from Abbeville, Louisiana, who transferred from LSU to Vanderbilt in 1897, lettered this year in football. After football, he became a self-made business magnate of a successful rice milling company. Grantland Rice lettered at end.

== Schedule ==
Date	Time	Opponent	Site	Result	Attendance	Source
October 6		at Cumberland (TN)	Cumberland, TN	W 32–0		
October 14		Miami (OH)*	Dudley Field; Nashville, TN	W 12–0		
October 21	3:30 p.m.	Cincinnati*	Dudley Field; Nashville, TN	L 0–6	1,000	
October 30		Indiana*	Dudley Field; Nashville, TN	L 0–20		
November 4		vs. Ole Miss	Billings Park; Memphis, TN (rivalry)	W 11–0		
November 11		Bethel (KY)*	Dudley Field; Nashville, TN	W 22–0		
November 18		Texas	Dudley Field; Nashville, TN	W 6–0		
November 25		Central (KY)	Dudley Field; Nashville, TN	W 21–16		
November 30	2:30 p.m.	Nashville	Dudley Field; Nashville, TN	W 5–0	4,000	
*Non-conference game
