= Bart Sims =

American football player (1878–1934)

Profile
- Position: End

Personal information
- Born: May 9, 1878; Bryan, Texas, U.S.
- Died: January 6, 1934 (aged 55); Bryan, Texas, U.S.
- Listed height: 6 ft 0 in (1.83 m)
- Listed weight: 185 lb (84 kg)

Career information
- College: Sewanee (1899)

Awards and highlights
- SIAA championship (1899); All-Southern (1899)

Bartlet et Ultimus "The Caboose" Sims (May 9, 1878 – January 6, 1934) was an All-Southern college football end for the Sewanee Tigers of Sewanee: The University of the South, a member of its 1899 "Iron Men". He also kicked the extra points; his 11 extra points against Cumberland is still a school record. A documentary film about the 1899 Team and Sims' role was released in 2022 called Unrivaled: Sewanee 1899.

== Early life ==
Bartlet et Ultimus Sims was born on May 9, 1878, in Bryan, Texas. It was said his parents named him "et Ultimus" as their last child.
