= Wild Bill Claiborne =

American football player (1872–1933)

W. S. Claiborne
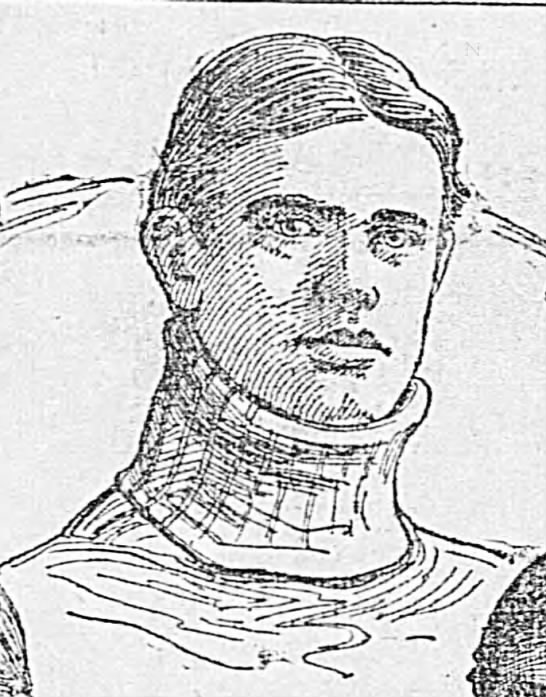
- Claiborne depicted c. 1900

Profile
- Position: Guard

Personal information
- Born: December 11, 1872; Geddis, Amherst County, Virginia, U.S.
- Died: January 7, 1933 (aged 60); Florida, U.S.
- Listed height: 6 ft 0 in (1.83 m)
- Listed weight: 190 lb (86 kg)

Career information
- College: Roanoke (1891–1897); Sewanee (1899–1900)

Awards and highlights
- SIAA championship (1899); All-Southern (1899)

William Stirling "Wild Bill" Claiborne (December 11, 1879 – January 7, 1933) was an American college football player and Episcopal archdeacon of Sewanee and East Tennessee. Before he was archdeacon, he was rector of Otey Memorial parish.

== College football ==
Claiborne attended Roanoke College from 1891 to 1897.

Claiborne was a prominent guard for the Sewanee Tigers of Sewanee: The University of the South, a small Episcopal school in the mountains of Tennessee. He played on the 1899 "Iron Men" who won five road games in six days and all by shutout, selected All-Southern. Claiborne was blind in one eye, and used his discolored eye for purposes of intimidation on the field. A documentary film about the team and Claiborne's role was released in 2022 called "Unrivaled: Sewanee 1899." At Sewanee Claiborne studied theology and was ordained priest in 1901.

== Religious work ==
He was a member of the Missionary Society. He was called the "apostle of the mountain folk" for his work among Tennessee mountain people. He founded the St. Andrew's School for Mountain Boys, refounded St. Mary's School, founded the DuBose Memorial Training School, and established Emerald-Hogston Hospital. Claiborne wrote a book titled Roy in the Mountains.

One description of his service in the ministry reads "eleven years ago he went into the mountains of East Tennessee and rolled up his sleeves. They are still up."
