= 1899 Auburn Tigers football team =

American college football season

1899 Auburn Tigers football
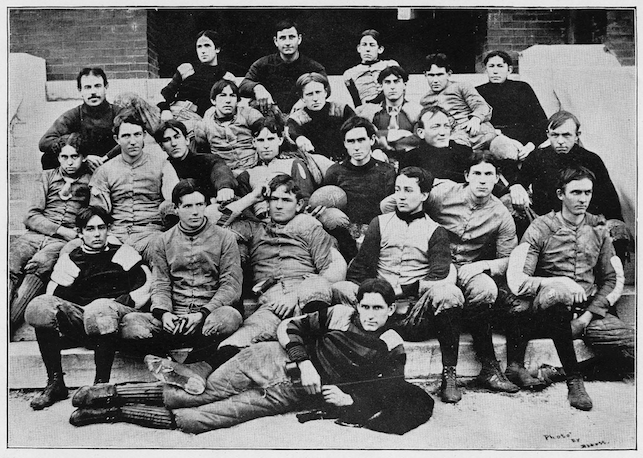
- Conference: Southern Intercollegiate Athletic Association
- Record: 3–1–1 (2–1–1 SIAA)
- Head coach: John Heisman (5th season)
- Offensive scheme: Hurry-up offense
- Captain: Arthur Feagin

1899 Southern Intercollegiate Athletic Association football standings
	Conf.					Overall
Team	W		L		T	W		L		T
Sewanee $	11	–	0	–	0	12	–	0	–	0
Vanderbilt	5	–	0	–	0	7	–	2	–	0
Alabama	1	–	0	–	0	3	–	1	–	0
Nashville	4	–	1	–	0	4	–	1	–	1
Tennessee	2	–	1	–	0	6	–	2	–	0
Auburn	2	–	1	–	1	3	–	1	–	1
Texas	3	–	2	–	0	6	–	2	–	0
North Carolina	1	–	1	–	0	7	–	3	–	0
Ole Miss	3	–	4	–	0	3	–	4	–	0
Georgia	2	–	3	–	1	2	–	3	–	1
Clemson	1	–	2	–	0	4	–	2	–	0
Central (KY)	1	–	2	–	0	1	–	2	–	0
LSU	1	–	3	–	0	1	–	4	–	0
Kentucky State	0	–	1	–	0	5	–	2	–	2
SW Presbyterian	0	–	1	–	0	1	–	1	–	0
Cumberland (TN)	0	–	3	–	0	0	–	3	–	0
Georgia Tech	0	–	5	–	0	0	–	6	–	0
Tulane	0	–	5	–	0	0	–	6	–	1
$ – Conference champion

The 1899 Auburn Tigers football team represented Auburn University in the 1899 Southern Intercollegiate Athletic Association football season. The Tigers went 3–1–1, outscoring their opponents 148–11 and holding four opponents scoreless. This team was noteworthy as the last to be coached by Tigers head coach, John Heisman. It is also one of the first teams to employ a Hurry-up offense. As Heisman recalled:

The team of '99—my last at Auburn—was a great one. It only weighed about 160 (pounds per player), but its speed and team work were something truly wonderful. I do not think I have ever seen so fast a team as that was. It would line up and get the ball in play at times before the opposing players were up off the ground. You see it was a 'stunt' of ours to catch them off side and get the benefit of the penalty. Nowadays no team is taken by surprise by such lightning lining up; but that Auburn team of '99 was the first to show what could be done with speedy play, and then it wasn't long before all other teams were laboring with might and main to inject speed into their work.

In Heisman's opinion, this was his best team while at Auburn.

The squad is also remembered as the only team to score in the legendary 1899 Sewanee team that went undefeated and beat Texas, Texas A&M, Tulane, LSU and Ole Miss over a 6-day span. Auburn lost their matchup to the "Iron Men" by a single point.

== Schedule ==
Date	Opponent	Site	Result	Attendance	Source
October 14	Georgia Tech	Drill Field; Auburn, AL (rivalry)	W 63–0		
October 21	Montgomery Athletic Club*	Drill Field; Auburn, AL	W 40–0		
October 28	Clemson	Drill Field; Auburn, AL (rivalry)	W 34–0		
November 18	at Georgia	Piedmont Park; Atlanta, GA (rivalry)	T 0–0		
November 30	Sewanee	Riverside Park; Montgomery, AL	L 10–11	4,000	
*Non-conference game
