= John J. Coleman =

American football player

Profile
- Position: Quarterback/Halfback

Personal information
- Born: New Orleans, Louisiana

Career information
- College: LSU (1899–1903)

John J. Coleman was a college football player for Louisiana State University (LSU), the school's second five-year letterman (1899, 1900, 1901, 1902, 1903). He was a quarterback on the 1902 team, which had the longest schedule yet for the Tigers and also featured the most games on the road. The team lost only to Southern Intercollegiate Athletic Association (SIAA) champion Vanderbilt. Coleman was captain of the 1903 team.
