= Arthur Feagin =

American football player (1878–1932)

Profile
- Position: Halfback

Personal information
- Born: March 7, 1878; Union Springs, Alabama, U.S.
- Died: March 25, 1932 (aged 54); Montgomery, Alabama, U.S.

Career information
- College: Auburn (1899)

Awards and highlights
- All-Southern (1899)

Arthur Henry Feagin (March 7, 1878 – March 25, 1932) was an American college football player.

== Auburn University ==
Feagin was a prominent halfback for John Heisman's Auburn Tigers football teams of the Alabama Polytechnic Institute. At Auburn he was a member of Phi Delta Theta.

=== 1899 ===
Feagin was captain and All-Southern in 1899. In Heisman's opinion this was his best team while at Auburn. The team was the only one to score on Sewanee's "Iron Men." A report of the game says "Feagin is a player of exceptional ability, and runs with such force that some ground belongs to him on every attempt."
