= R. B. Nalley =

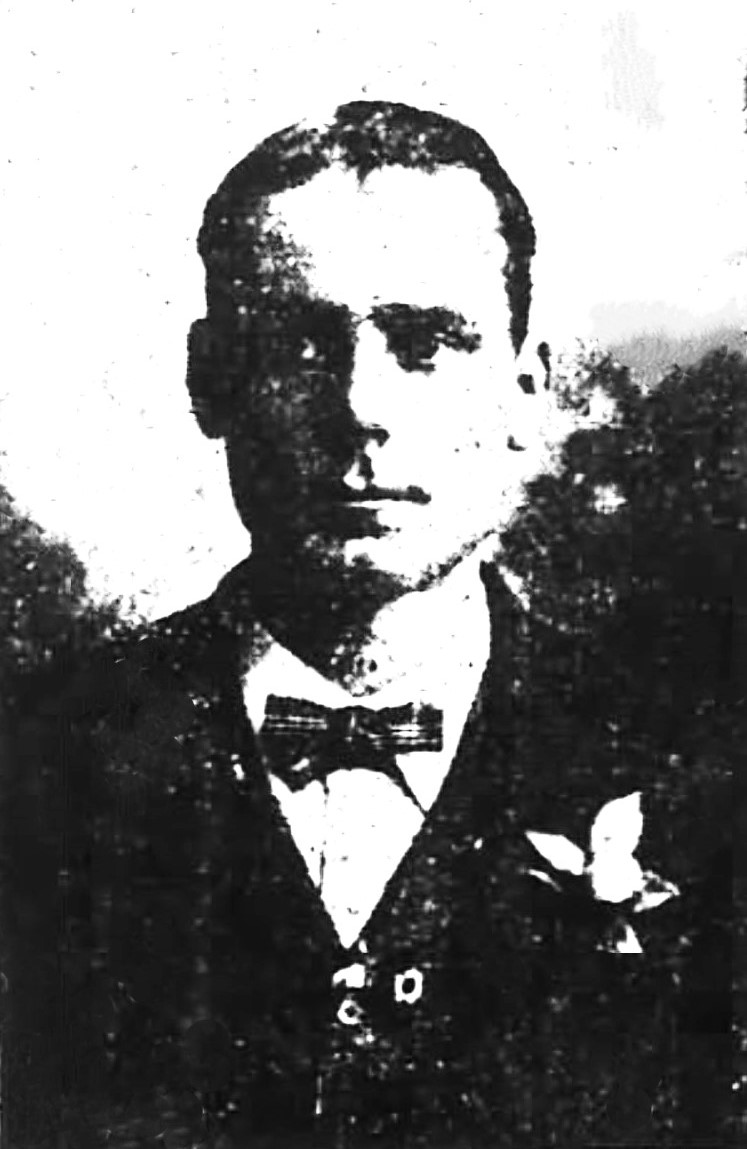

Biographical details
- Born: December 27, 1870; Villa Rica, Georgia, U.S.
- Died: November 28, 1902 (aged 31); Atlanta, Georgia, U.S.

Playing career
- 1892–1896: Georgia
- Positions: Tackle, center, halfback

Coaching career (HC unless noted)
- 1897–1898: Georgia (assistant)
- 1899: Georgia Tech

Head coaching record
- Overall: 0–6–0

Rufus Benajamin "Cow" Nalley (December 27, 1870 – November 28, 1902) was a three sport participant at the University of Georgia (football, baseball, and track and field), and a later head coach for Georgia Tech. He was described as being of average height and weighing around 200 pounds.

Nalley is the only five-year letterman in the history of Georgia Bulldogs football, lettering each year from 1892 to 1896. In Georgia's inaugural season in 1892, Nalley played tackle. During the next two seasons (1893 and 1894), Nalley played center. When Pop Warner came to coach Georgia football for the 1895 and 1896 seasons, Nalley was moved to halfback. Cow Nalley was the captain of the 1896 team, the first undefeated football team at Georgia.

Nalley was a three-year letterman in baseball, earning letters in 1894, 1895 and 1896. He also threw the hammer and the shot put when participating in track and field events at Georgia.

After his playing career, Nalley joined Georgia as an assistant coach for the 1897 and 1898 seasons. Nalley was named as head coach for the Georgia Tech football team on September 18, 1899; however, the season was not a success and the team lost all six of its games. He did not return to coach the team the following year.

Nalley died on November 28, 1902, in Atlanta, Georgia, after a short, serious illness. According to some, the last thing that he heard before losing consciousness on November 27, 1902, was that Georgia had beaten its rival Auburn earlier that day, news that caused him to smile. It was the first victory for Georgia in the Deep South's Oldest Rivalry since the championship season of 1896 for which Nalley played.

== Head coaching record ==
Year	Team	Overall	Conference	Standing	Bowl/playoffs
Georgia Tech (Southern Intercollegiate Athletic Association) (1899)
1899	Georgia Tech	0–6–0	0–5–0	T–14th	
Georgia Tech:		0–6–0	0–5–0		
Total:		0–6–0			
