= 1899 Texas Longhorns football team =

American college football season

1899 Texas Longhorns football
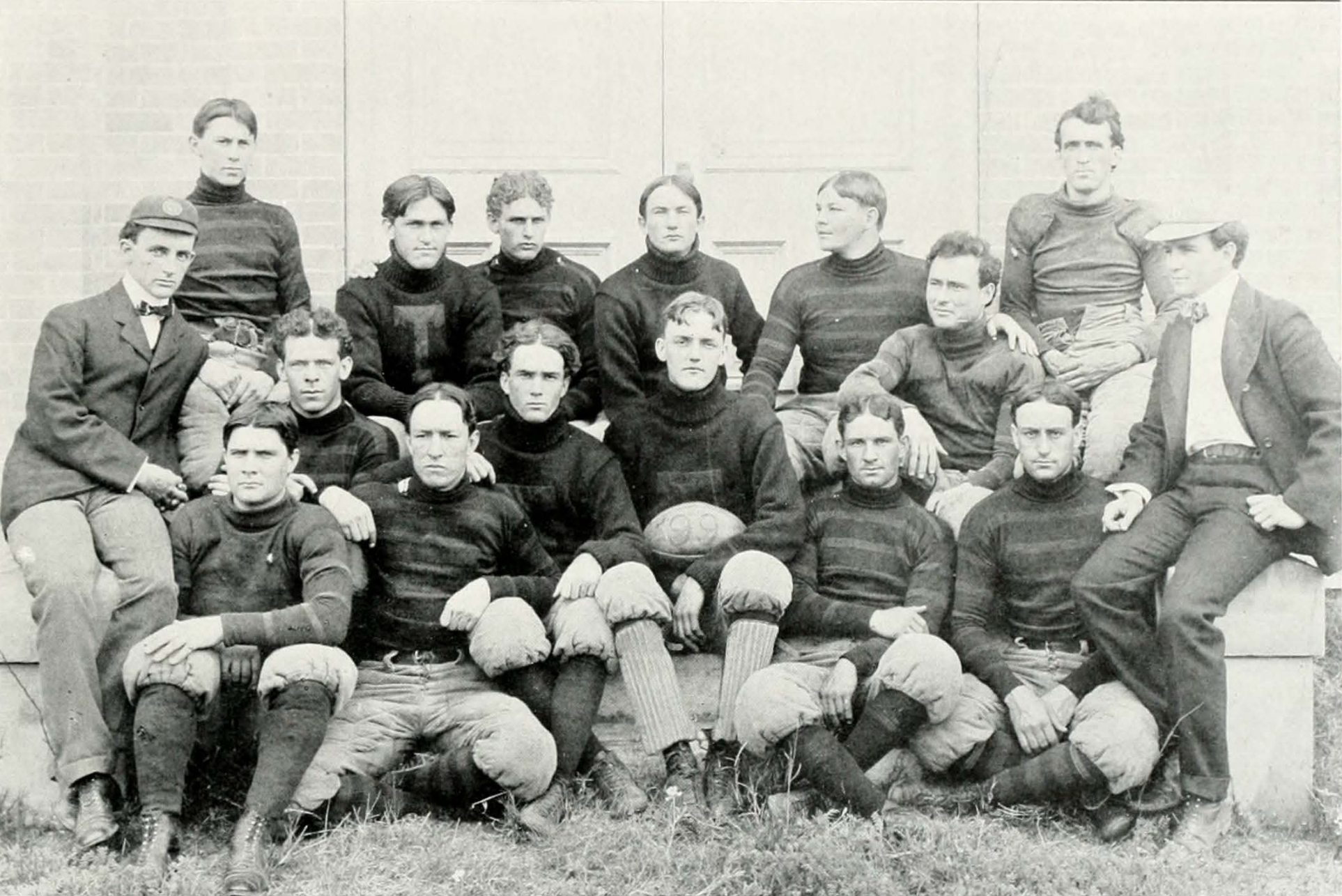
- Conference: Southern Intercollegiate Athletic Association
- Record: 6–2 (3–2 SIAA)
- Head coach: Maurice Gordon Clarke (1st season)
- Captain: James H. Hart
- Home stadium: Varsity Athletic Field

1899 Southern Intercollegiate Athletic Association football standings
	Conf.					Overall
Team	W		L		T	W		L		T
Sewanee $	11	–	0	–	0	12	–	0	–	0
Vanderbilt	5	–	0	–	0	7	–	2	–	0
Alabama	1	–	0	–	0	3	–	1	–	0
Nashville	4	–	1	–	0	4	–	1	–	1
Tennessee	2	–	1	–	0	6	–	2	–	0
Auburn	2	–	1	–	1	3	–	1	–	1
Texas	3	–	2	–	0	6	–	2	–	0
North Carolina	1	–	1	–	0	7	–	3	–	0
Ole Miss	3	–	4	–	0	3	–	4	–	0
Georgia	2	–	3	–	1	2	–	3	–	1
Clemson	1	–	2	–	0	4	–	2	–	0
Central (KY)	1	–	2	–	0	1	–	2	–	0
LSU	1	–	3	–	0	1	–	4	–	0
Kentucky State	0	–	1	–	0	5	–	2	–	2
SW Presbyterian	0	–	1	–	0	1	–	1	–	0
Cumberland (TN)	0	–	3	–	0	0	–	3	–	0
Georgia Tech	0	–	5	–	0	0	–	6	–	0
Tulane	0	–	5	–	0	0	–	6	–	1
$ – Conference champion

The 1899 Texas 'Varsity football team represented The University of Texas (now known as the University of Texas at Austin Longhorns) as a member of the Southern Intercollegiate Athletic Association (SIAA) during the 1899 college football season. Led by first-year head coach Maurice Gordon Clarke, the Longhorns compiled an overall record of 6–2.

== Schedule ==
Date	Opponent	Site	Result	Attendance	Source
October 21	at Dallas University*	Dallas, TX	W 11–6		
October 31	San Antonio Town Team*	Varsity Athletic Field; Austin, TX	W 28–0		
November 4	vs. Texas A&M*	San Antonio Fairgrounds; San Antonio, TX (rivalry)	W 6–0	4,000	
November 9	Sewanee	Varsity Athletic Field; Austin, TX	L 0–12	2,500	
November 18	at Vanderbilt	Dudley Field; Nashville, TN	L 0–6		
November 20	at Tulane	Tulane Athletic Field; New Orleans, LA	W 11–0		
November 25	Tulane	Varsity Athletic Field; Austin, TX	W 32–0		
November 30	LSU	Varsity Athletic Field; Austin, TX	W 29–0		
*Non-conference game

== Personnel ==
=== Line ===
Player	Position	Games played	Home town	Height	Weight	Age
Walter Schreiner	Right End	8	Kerrville, Texas	5'10"	144	22
M. McMahon	Right Tackle	8	Savoy, Texas	5'11"	166	21
L.G. Sam	Right Guard	8	Houston, Texas	6'2"	227	20
Edward Overshiner	Center	8	Valley View, Texas	5'10"	171	25
John Scott	Left Guard	8	Hallsville, Texas	5'8"	180	22
James Hart [C]	Left Tackle	7	Austin, Texas	6'2"	164	21
Walter Montieth	Left End	8	Belton, Texas	5'11"	160	22

=== Backfield ===
Player	Position	Games played	Home town	Height	Weight	Age
Semp Russ	Quarterback	6	San Antonio, Texas	5'7"	142	22
Cade Bethea	Right Halfback	4	Seven Oaks, Texas	5'8"	164	21
Raymond Keller	Left Halfback	8	San Antonio, Texas	5'10"	164	22
Christopher Cole	Fullback	8	San Antonio, Texas	5'10"	150	22

==== Subs ====
Player	Position	Games played	Home town	Height	Weight	Age
Hartford Jenkins	Tackle	4	Bastrop, Texas	5'10"	166	18
A.S. Thweatt	Halfback	2	Austin, Texas	5'6"	150	20
A.T. Cole	Guard	3	Cleburne, Texas	5'10"	180	28
Joe Byrd	Halfback	5	Missouri	5'8"	145	20
Claude McClellan	Guard	4	Coleman, Texas	5'7"	160	21
