= 1899 Tennessee Volunteers football team =

American college football season

1899 Tennessee Volunteers football
- Conference: Southern Intercollegiate Athletic Association
- Record: 6–2 (2–1 SIAA)
- Head coach: J. A. Pierce (1st season)
- Captain: William L. Terry
- Home stadium: Baldwin Park

1899 Southern Intercollegiate Athletic Association football standings
	Conf.					Overall
Team	W		L		T	W		L		T
Sewanee $	11	–	0	–	0	12	–	0	–	0
Vanderbilt	5	–	0	–	0	7	–	2	–	0
Alabama	1	–	0	–	0	3	–	1	–	0
Nashville	4	–	1	–	0	4	–	1	–	1
Tennessee	2	–	1	–	0	6	–	2	–	0
Auburn	2	–	1	–	1	3	–	1	–	1
Texas	3	–	2	–	0	6	–	2	–	0
North Carolina	1	–	1	–	0	7	–	3	–	0
Ole Miss	3	–	4	–	0	3	–	4	–	0
Georgia	2	–	3	–	1	2	–	3	–	1
Clemson	1	–	2	–	0	4	–	2	–	0
Central (KY)	1	–	2	–	0	1	–	2	–	0
LSU	1	–	3	–	0	1	–	4	–	0
Kentucky State	0	–	1	–	0	5	–	2	–	2
SW Presbyterian	0	–	1	–	0	1	–	1	–	0
Cumberland (TN)	0	–	3	–	0	0	–	3	–	0
Georgia Tech	0	–	5	–	0	0	–	6	–	0
Tulane	0	–	5	–	0	0	–	6	–	1
$ – Conference champion

The 1899 Tennessee Volunteers football team represented the University of Tennessee in the 1899 Southern Intercollegiate Athletic Association football season. They were the first Tennessee team to have a head coach. J. A. Pierce helmed the team in 1899 and 1900. The 1899 Tennessee Volunteers won six games and lost two.

== Schedule ==
Date	Opponent	Site	Result	Source
October 11	King*	Baldwin Park; Knoxville, TN	W 11–5	
October 21	VPI*	Baldwin Park; Knoxville, TN	L 0–5	
October 28	at Sewanee	Hardee Field; Sewanee, TN	L 0–51	
November 4	Kentucky State College	Baldwin Park; Knoxville, TN (rivalry)	W 12–0	
November 11	Georgia	Baldwin Park; Knoxville, TN (rivalry)	W 5–0	
November 23	Washington and Lee*	Baldwin Park; Knoxville, TN	W 11–0	
November 30	Kentucky University*	Baldwin Park; Knoxville, TN	W 41–0	
December 25	at Grant*	Chattanooga, TN	W 6–0	
*Non-conference game
