= 1899 Clemson Tigers football team =

American college football season

1899 Clemson Tigers football
- Conference: Southern Intercollegiate Athletic Association
- Record: 4–2 (1–2 SIAA)
- Head coach: Walter Riggs (2nd season)
- Captain: J. N. Walker

1899 Southern Intercollegiate Athletic Association football standings
	Conf.					Overall
Team	W		L		T	W		L		T
Sewanee $	11	–	0	–	0	12	–	0	–	0
Vanderbilt	5	–	0	–	0	7	–	2	–	0
Alabama	1	–	0	–	0	3	–	1	–	0
Nashville	4	–	1	–	0	4	–	1	–	1
Tennessee	2	–	1	–	0	6	–	2	–	0
Auburn	2	–	1	–	1	3	–	1	–	1
Texas	3	–	2	–	0	6	–	2	–	0
North Carolina	1	–	1	–	0	7	–	3	–	0
Ole Miss	3	–	4	–	0	3	–	4	–	0
Georgia	2	–	3	–	1	2	–	3	–	1
Clemson	1	–	2	–	0	4	–	2	–	0
Central (KY)	1	–	2	–	0	1	–	2	–	0
LSU	1	–	3	–	0	1	–	4	–	0
Kentucky State	0	–	1	–	0	5	–	2	–	2
SW Presbyterian	0	–	1	–	0	1	–	1	–	0
Cumberland (TN)	0	–	3	–	0	0	–	3	–	0
Georgia Tech	0	–	5	–	0	0	–	6	–	0
Tulane	0	–	5	–	0	0	–	6	–	1
$ – Conference champion

The 1899 Clemson Tigers football team represented Clemson Agricultural College—now known as Clemson University–during the 1899 Southern Intercollegiate Athletic Association football season. The Tigers completed their fourth season with a record of 4–2, with wins over Davidson, South Carolina, North Carolina A&M, and Georgia Tech and losses to Georgia and Auburn. Clemson did not host any games, but played a mix of away and neutral site games. Walter Riggs served again as coach, having also led the team in its inaugural 1896 season, while J. N. Walker was the captain.

== Schedule ==
Date	Time	Opponent	Site	Result	Source
October 7		at Georgia	Herty Field; Athens, GA (rivalry)	L 0–10	
October 14		vs. Davidson*	Rock Hill, SC	W 10–0	
October 28		at Auburn	Drill Field; Auburn, AL (rivalry)	L 0–34	
November 9	11:00 a.m.	at South Carolina*	Columbia, SC (Big Thursday)	W 34–0	
November 18		vs. North Carolina A&M*	Rock Hill, SC (rivalry)	W 24–0	
November 30		vs. Georgia Tech	Greenville, SC (rivalry)	W 41–5	
*Non-conference game; All times are in Eastern time
