= Tony Barnhart =

American journalist

Tony Barnhart is a former reporter for the Atlanta Journal-Constitution who currently appears as a college football insider for CBS Sports on their college football coverage.

Barnhart graduated with a degree in journalism from the University of Georgia in 1976. He began his career as a reporter for the Greensboro News & Record. He moved to Atlanta in 1984, where he covered mostly ACC action. In July 1987, he started as the college sports editor of the Atlanta Journal-Constitution.

Before going to CBS, he was a reporter for ESPN's college football coverage beginning in 1993. He started appearing as a regional beat reporter on their "halftime blitz." Starting with the 1997 season, he began appearing on College GameDay.

Barnhart currently hosts The Tony Barnhart Show on CBS College Network.

Barhnart's awards and elected offices include 2010–Present: Honors Court, National Football Foundation and College Hall of Fame, 2009 Bert McGrane Award (FWAA Hall of Fame), Football Writers Association of America, 2008 Edwin Pope Vanguard Media Award, Orange Bowl Association, 2007 Fred Russell Contribution to Sports Writing Award, All-American Football Foundation, 2006 Jake Wade Award, College Sports Information Directors of America, 2006 Alumni Achievement Award, Delta Tau Delta fraternity, 2006 President, United States Basketball Writers Association, 2001-06 Honors Court, National Football Foundation and College Hall of Fame, 2002 Furman Bisher Award for media excellence, Atlanta Sports Council, 1999 Sports Writer of the Year, National Sports Casters and Sports Writers Association, 1998 President, Football Writers Association of America.

== Personal life ==
He was born on August 4, 1953, and is married with one child.
