= 1899 Georgia Bulldogs football team =

American college football season

1899 Georgia Bulldogs football
- Conference: Southern Intercollegiate Athletic Association
- Record: 2–3–1 (2–3–1 SIAA)
- Head coach: Gordon Saussy (1st season)
- Captain: W. R. Ritchie
- Home stadium: Herty Field

1899 Southern Intercollegiate Athletic Association football standings
	Conf.					Overall
Team	W		L		T	W		L		T
Sewanee $	11	–	0	–	0	12	–	0	–	0
Vanderbilt	5	–	0	–	0	7	–	2	–	0
Alabama	1	–	0	–	0	3	–	1	–	0
Nashville	4	–	1	–	0	4	–	1	–	1
Tennessee	2	–	1	–	0	6	–	2	–	0
Auburn	2	–	1	–	1	3	–	1	–	1
Texas	3	–	2	–	0	6	–	2	–	0
North Carolina	1	–	1	–	0	7	–	3	–	0
Ole Miss	3	–	4	–	0	3	–	4	–	0
Georgia	2	–	3	–	1	2	–	3	–	1
Clemson	1	–	2	–	0	4	–	2	–	0
Central (KY)	1	–	2	–	0	1	–	2	–	0
LSU	1	–	3	–	0	1	–	4	–	0
Kentucky State	0	–	1	–	0	5	–	2	–	2
SW Presbyterian	0	–	1	–	0	1	–	1	–	0
Cumberland (TN)	0	–	3	–	0	0	–	3	–	0
Georgia Tech	0	–	5	–	0	0	–	6	–	0
Tulane	0	–	5	–	0	0	–	6	–	1
$ – Conference champion

The 1899 Georgia Bulldogs football team represented the University of Georgia during the 1899 Southern Intercollegiate Athletic Association football season. The team competed as a member of the Southern Intercollegiate Athletic Association (SIAA) and completed the season with a disappointing 2–3–1 record. However, a season highlight was the third-straight victory over Georgia Tech. 1899 also saw the first meeting between the Georgia Bulldogs and Tennessee (a loss for Georgia). This was the team's first and only season under the guidance of head coach Gordon Saussy.

== Schedule ==
Date	Opponent	Site	Result	Source
October 7	Clemson	Herty Field; Athens, GA (rivalry)	W 10–0	
October 21	vs. Sewanee	Piedmont Park; Atlanta, GA	L 0–12	
October 28	Georgia Tech	Herty Field; Athens, GA (rivalry)	W 33–0	
November 11	at Tennessee	Baldwin Park; Knoxville, TN (rivalry)	L 0–5	
November 18	vs. Auburn	Piedmont Park; Atlanta, GA (rivalry)	T 0–0	
November 30	vs. North Carolina	Piedmont Park; Atlanta, GA	L 0–5	
