= 1899 Tulane Olive and Blue football team =

American college football season

1899 Tulane Olive and Blue football
- Conference: Southern Intercollegiate Athletic Association
- Record: 0–6–1 (0–5 SIAA)
- Head coach: Harris T. Collier (1st season)
- Captain: Charles Eshleman
- Home stadium: Tulane Athletic Field

1899 Southern Intercollegiate Athletic Association football standings
	Conf.					Overall
Team	W		L		T	W		L		T
Sewanee $	11	–	0	–	0	12	–	0	–	0
Vanderbilt	5	–	0	–	0	7	–	2	–	0
Alabama	1	–	0	–	0	3	–	1	–	0
Nashville	4	–	1	–	0	4	–	1	–	1
Tennessee	2	–	1	–	0	6	–	2	–	0
Auburn	2	–	1	–	1	3	–	1	–	1
Texas	3	–	2	–	0	6	–	2	–	0
North Carolina	1	–	1	–	0	7	–	3	–	0
Ole Miss	3	–	4	–	0	3	–	4	–	0
Georgia	2	–	3	–	1	2	–	3	–	1
Clemson	1	–	2	–	0	4	–	2	–	0
Central (KY)	1	–	2	–	0	1	–	2	–	0
LSU	1	–	3	–	0	1	–	4	–	0
Kentucky State	0	–	1	–	0	5	–	2	–	2
SW Presbyterian	0	–	1	–	0	1	–	1	–	0
Cumberland (TN)	0	–	3	–	0	0	–	3	–	0
Georgia Tech	0	–	5	–	0	0	–	6	–	0
Tulane	0	–	5	–	0	0	–	6	–	1
$ – Conference champion

The 1899 Tulane Olive and Blue football team was an American football team that represented Tulane University as a member of the Southern Intercollegiate Athletic Association (SIAA) during the 1899 college football season. In their first year under head coach Harris T. Collier, the team compiled an overall record of 0–6–1.

== Schedule ==
Date	Opponent	Site	Result	Attendance	Source
November 11	Sewanee	Tulane Athletic Field; New Orleans, LA	L 0–23	~1,000	
November 18	Southern Athletic Club*	Tulane Athletic Field; New Orleans, LA	T 0–0		
November 20	Texas	Tulane Athletic Field; New Orleans, LA	L 0–11		
November 25	at Texas	Varsity Athletic Field; Austin, TX	L 0–32		
November 27	vs. Texas A&M*	Herald Park; Houston, TX	L 0–22		
November 30	Ole Miss	Tulane Athletic Field; New Orleans, LA (rivalry)	L 0–15		
December 8	at LSU	State Field; Baton Rouge, LA (rivalry)	L 0–38		
*Non-conference game
