= Warbler Wilson =

American football player and city recorder (1878–1958)

Profile
- Position: Quarterback

Personal information
- Born: November 28, 1878; Rock Hill, South Carolina, U.S.
- Died: December 8, 1958 (aged 80); Rock Hill, South Carolina, U.S.
- Listed height: 5 ft 10 in (1.78 m)
- Listed weight: 154 lb (70 kg)

Career information
- College: South Carolina (1896); Sewanee (1897–1900)

Awards and highlights
- SIAA championship (1898, 1899); All-Southern (1899)

William Blackburn "Warbler" Wilson (November 28, 1878 – December 8, 1958) was a college football player and city recorder.

== College football ==
Wilson was an All-Southern quarterback.

=== South Carolina ===
Wilson came from Rock Hill, South Carolina, and played as a backup for the South Carolina Gamecocks in 1896.

=== Sewanee ===
In part due to Luke Lea, Wilson came to Sewanee: The University of the South as a law student. He was a prominent quarterback from 1897 to 1900.

==== 1898 ====
In 1898 he led the Tigers to an undefeated year, playing through a broken leg in the 19–4 victory over Vanderbilt.

==== 1899 ====
Wilson was the quarterback and a key member of the undefeated 1899 "Iron Men" who won five road games by shutout in six days. Supposedly he also played with a broken leg for 45 minutes in the last game of the road trip of '99, against Ole Miss. A documentary film about this team and Wilson's role was released in 2022 called "Unrivaled: Sewanee 1899."

==== 1900 ====
He was captain of the team in 1900.

== City recorder ==
He was the first city recorder in his native town of Rock Hill.
