= 1899 North Carolina Tar Heels football team =

American college football season

1899 North Carolina Tar Heels football
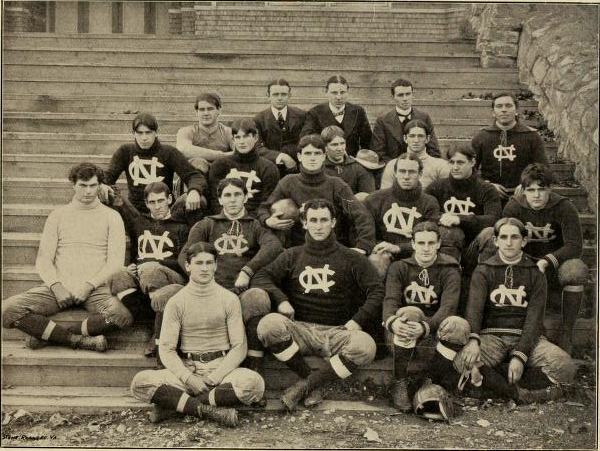
- Conference: Southern Intercollegiate Athletic Association
- Record: 7–3–1 (1–1 SIAA)
- Head coach: William A. Reynolds (3rd season)
- Assistant coach: John Gere Jayne (1st season)
- Captain: Samuel Shull
- Home stadium: Campus Athletic Field (I)

1899 Southern Intercollegiate Athletic Association football standings
	Conf.					Overall
Team	W		L		T	W		L		T
Sewanee $	11	–	0	–	0	12	–	0	–	0
Vanderbilt	5	–	0	–	0	7	–	2	–	0
Alabama	1	–	0	–	0	3	–	1	–	0
Nashville	4	–	1	–	0	4	–	1	–	1
Tennessee	2	–	1	–	0	6	–	2	–	0
Auburn	2	–	1	–	1	3	–	1	–	1
Texas	3	–	2	–	0	6	–	2	–	0
North Carolina	1	–	1	–	0	7	–	3	–	0
Ole Miss	3	–	4	–	0	3	–	4	–	0
Georgia	2	–	3	–	1	2	–	3	–	1
Clemson	1	–	2	–	0	4	–	2	–	0
Central (KY)	1	–	2	–	0	1	–	2	–	0
LSU	1	–	3	–	0	1	–	4	–	0
Kentucky State	0	–	1	–	0	5	–	2	–	2
SW Presbyterian	0	–	1	–	0	1	–	1	–	0
Cumberland (TN)	0	–	3	–	0	0	–	3	–	0
Georgia Tech	0	–	5	–	0	0	–	6	–	0
Tulane	0	–	5	–	0	0	–	6	–	1
$ – Conference champion

The 1899 North Carolina Tar Heels football team represented the University of North Carolina in the 1899 Southern Intercollegiate Athletic Association football season. They played eleven games with a final record of 7–3–1. The team captain for the 1899 season was Samuel Shull.

Former Sewanee head coach John Gere Jayne (Princeton '97) was hired as an assistant coach.

== Schedule ==
Date	Time	Opponent	Site	Result	Attendance	Source
October 7	4:00 p.m.	North Carolina A&M	Campus Athletic Field (I); Chapel Hill, NC (rivalry)	W 34–0		
October 12	1:30 p.m.	Oak Ridge	Campus Athletic Field (I); Chapel Hill, NC	W 16–0		
October 14	2:00 p.m.	Guilford	Campus Athletic Field (I); Chapel Hill, NC	W 45–0		
October 21	3:30 p.m.	vs. Davidson	Latta Park; Charlotte, NC	W 10–0		
October 23	2:00 p.m.	Horner's School (NC)	Campus Athletic Field (I); Chapel Hill, NC	W 46–0		
October 28	2:00 p.m.	at North Carolina A&M	State Fairgrounds (II); Raleigh, NC	T 11–11		
October 31	3:15 p.m.	"Old" Maryland	Campus Athletic Field (I); Chapel Hill, NC	W 6–0		
November 4		at Navy	Worden Field; Annapolis, MD	L 0–12		
November 8	2:00 p.m.	at Princeton	University Field; Princeton, NJ	L 0–30		
November 30	2:30 p.m.	vs. Georgia	Piedmont Park; Atlanta, GA	W 5–0	3,000	
December 2	2:30 p.m.	vs. Sewanee	Piedmont Park; Atlanta, GA	L 0–5	2,000	
