= Billy Suter =

American journalist

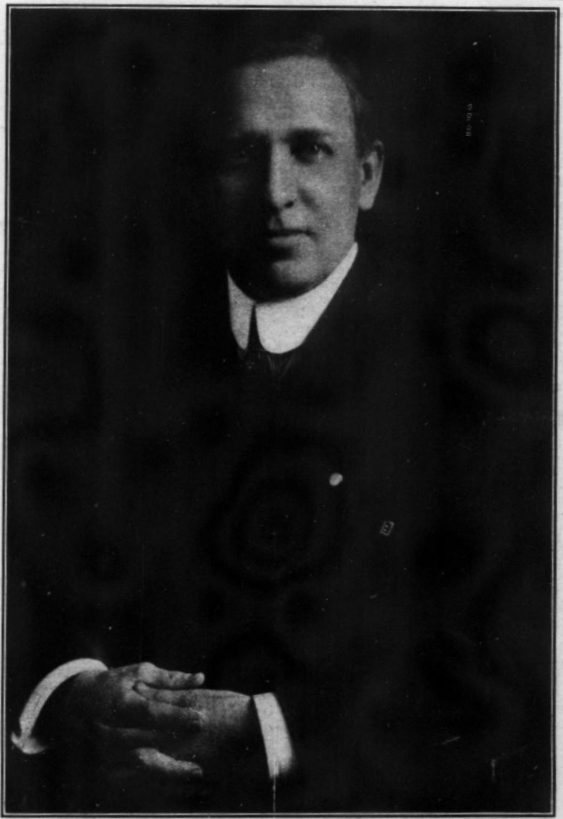
- Suter, c. 1912

Biographical details
- Born: December 10, 1874; Greensburg, Pennsylvania, U.S.
- Died: October 31, 1946 (aged 71); Bronxville, New York, U.S.

Playing career

Football
- 1893: Washington & Jefferson
- 1894: Penn State
- 1895–1898: Princeton

Baseball
- 1896–1899: Princeton
- 1904–1905: Wanderers (South Africa)
- Positions: Quarterback (football); Outfielder (baseball)

Coaching career (HC unless noted)

Football
- 1899–1901: Sewanee
- 1902: Georgetown

Baseball
- 1899–1901: Sewanee
- 1902: Georgetown

Head coaching record
- Overall: 29–6–3 (football)

Accomplishments and honors

Championships
- 1 SIAA (1899)

Herman Milton "Billy" Suter (December 10, 1874 – October 31, 1946) was an American football and baseball player, coach, referee, and athletic director. He was also a newspaper publisher.

== Early life ==
Suter was born on December 10, 1874, in Greensburg, Pennsylvania, to Henry Suter. Henry was from Sutersville, Pennsylvania, and died in 1883.

=== College ===
Suter was initiated into Pennsylvania Alpha in 1893 until 1897. Suter played for Washington & Jefferson, and the 1894 Penn State football team.

==== Princeton ====
He later enrolled at Princeton University. In 1895, as a member of the Princeton Tigers football team he once ran for a 95-yard touchdown against Harvard. Suter also captained the Princeton baseball team.

== Coaching career ==
=== Sewanee ===
J. G. "Lady" Jayne, coach of the 1898 Sewanee team, also a Princeton grad, was hired to coach in North Carolina. Jayne recommended Suter, with whom he had roomed at Princeton. Suter coached the famed "Iron Men" of the 1899 Sewanee Tigers which went 12–0, outscored opponents 322 to 10, and won 5 games on a 6-day road trip all by shutout. It is recalled memorably with the phrase "...and on the seventh day they rested." The team's manager who planned the trip was Luke Lea.

Grantland Rice was a shortstop on the Vanderbilt baseball team at the same time as Suter coached Sewanee. Rice praised his value as a leader, "yet he was one of the strictest disciplinarians I've ever known." Suter was fond of using the quick kick and for yelling from the sidelines when such was discouraged or illegal. A documentary film about the Sewanee 1899 team was released in 2022, titled Unrivaled: Sewanee 1899.

=== Georgetown ===
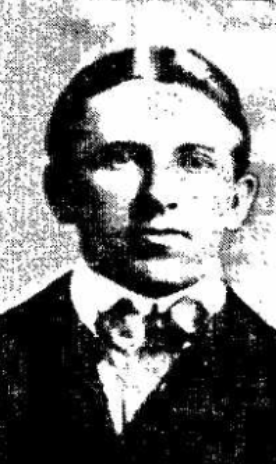
Suter, c. 1901

Suter was assistant coach to Georgetown Blue and Gray in 1901, and coached for a year in 1902, going 7–3. He also coached Georgetown baseball team in 1902.

== South Africa ==
Suter played for the Wanderers Baseball Club, in Transvaal, South Africa in 1903 and during the 1904–1905 inaugural league season. Salt Lake Telegram reported that Suter "formerly an outfielder on the Princeton team, leads the league in batting, with an average of .557, which is clouting them some. It is evident, however, that the spit ball has not as yet reached South Africa."

== Officiating ==
Once while officiating a game between Bucknell and V. P. I. in 1906 in which Bucknell won 10 to 0, V. P. I. had an 80-yard touchdown run derailed by a holding call from Suter. Fans disagreed with the call and rushed the field after Suter, hitting Suter over the head with a cane on which was a V. P. I. flag. Players on both teams assisted Suter, and police eventually rushed in with revolvers drawn to restore order.

== Publishing career ==
After coaching, Suter set up H M Suter Publishing Company in 1904 in Washington, D. C. for four years, before he became the publisher of the Nashville Tennessean from 1907 to 1912, where he gave Grantland Rice his first job as a sports writer. There was an interval between publishing jobs from 1915 to 1918. Suter was a book publisher in New York City during this period, and at the time of the First World War worked for the Foreign Press Cable Service Bureau of the Committee on Publish Information. Suter, former president Herbert Hoover, and others then acquired the Washington Herald at the end of 1919, for which Suter and one Walter S. Rogers was in charge until 1920. Suter throughout his life had once been publisher of the Herald, the Philadelphia Evening Times, The Elmira Advertiser and the Elmira Sunday Telegram. By 1924 he joined the New York City firm of Palmer, Suter, and Palmer which handled disposition of newspaper properties with an estimated value of $100 million.

== Head coaching record ==
=== Football ===
Year	Team	Overall	Conference	Standing	Bowl/playoffs
Sewanee Tigers (Southern Intercollegiate Athletic Association) (1899–1900)
1899	Sewanee	12–0	11–0	T–1st	
1900	Sewanee	6–1–1	5–0–1	4th	
Sewanee Tigers (Independent) (1901)
1901	Sewanee	4–2–2			
Sewanee:		22–3–3	16–0–1		
Georgetown Blue and Gray (Independent) (1902)
1902	Georgetown	7–3			
Georgetown:		7–3			
Total:		29–6–3			
National championship Conference title Conference division title or championship game berth
