= 1898 Southern Intercollegiate Athletic Association football season =

- League: NCAA
- Sport: College football
- Duration: October 1, 1898 through December 14, 1898
- Teams: 14

Regular Season
- Season champions: Sewanee

Football seasons
- ← 1897 1899 →

1898 Southern Intercollegiate Athletic Association football standings
	Conf.					Overall
Team	W		L		T	W		L		T
Sewanee	3	–	0	–	0	4	–	0	–	0
Auburn	2	–	0	–	0	2	–	1	–	0
LSU	1	–	0	–	0	1	–	0	–	0
Georgia	3	–	1	–	0	4	–	2	–	0
Clemson	1	–	1	–	0	3	–	1	–	0
Tulane	1	–	1	–	0	1	–	1	–	0
Vanderbilt	1	–	2	–	0	1	–	5	–	0
Mississippi	0	–	1	–	0	1	–	1	–	0
Texas	0	–	1	–	0	5	–	1	–	0
Nashville	0	–	2	–	0	0	–	2	–	0
Georgia Tech	0	–	3	–	0	0	–	4	–	0
Kentucky State#	0	–	0	–	0	7	–	0	–	0
Cumberland (TN)	0	–	0	–	0	0	–	0	–	0
SW Presbyterian	0	–	0	–	0	0	–	0	–	0
$ – Conference champion; # – State champion

The 1898 Southern Intercollegiate Athletic Association football season was the college football games played by the members schools of the Southern Intercollegiate Athletic Association as part of the 1898 college football season. This was the first season Georgia Tech participated in the conference.

The season began on October 1. As both Virginia and Vanderbilt had claims to Southern titles the previous year, their game in Louisville was most anticipated.

W. A. Lambeth said North Carolina had the best season of any southern team. But both Virginia and North Carolina were accused of playing ineligible players, and Caspar Whitney declared Sewanee champion of the south.

== Season overview ==
=== Results and team statistics ===
Conf. Rank	Team	Head coach	Conf. record	Win Pct.	Overall record	PPG	PAG
1t	Sewanee	John Gere Jayne	3–0–0	1.000	4–0–0	13.5	1.0
1t	Auburn	John Heisman	2–0–0	1.000	2–1–0	15.7	15.7
1t	LSU	Edmond Chavanne	1–0–0	1.000	1–0–0	37.0	0.0
4	Georgia	Charles McCarthy	3–1–0	.750	4–2–0	11.7	11.7
5t	Clemson	John Penton	1–1–0	.500	3–1–0	27.5	5.0
5t	Tulane	John Lombard	1–1–0	.500	1–1–0	7.0	23.0
7	Vanderbilt	R. G. Acton	1–2–0	.333	1–5–0	1.5	10.2
8t	Texas	David Farragut Edwards	0–1–0	.000	5–1–0	22.3	0.7
8t	Mississippi	T. G. Scarbrough	0–1–0	.000	1–1–0	9.0	8.0
8t	Nashville		0–2–0	.000	0–2–0	0.0	7.5
8t	Georgia Tech	J. B. Wood	0–3–0	.000	0–4–0	2.0	22.3
–	Kentucky State	W. R. Bass	0–0–0	–	7–0–0	25.9	0.0
?	Cumberland						
?	Southwestern Presbyterian						

Key

PPG = Average of points scored per game
PAG = Average of points allowed per game
t = Tied

=== Regular season ===
Index to colors and formatting
Non-conference matchup; SIAA member won
Non-conference matchup; SIAA member lost
Non-conference matchup; tie
Conference matchup

SIAA teams in bold.

==== Week One ====
Date	Visiting team	Home team	Site	Result	Attendance	Reference
October 1	Kentucky University	**Kentucky State**	Lexington, KY	**W** 18–0		

==== Week Two ====
Date	Visiting team	Home team	Site	Result	Attendance	Reference
October 8	**Kentucky State**	Georgetown (KY)	Georgetown, KY	**W** 28–0		
October 8	**Clemson**	**Georgia**	Herty Field • Athens, GA	**UGA** 20–8		

==== Week Three ====
Date	Visiting team	Home team	Site	Result	Attendance	Reference
October 15	Company H-8th Massachusetts	**Kentucky State**	Lexington, KY	**W** 59–0		
October 15	Atlanta Athletic Club	**Georgia**	Herty Field • Athens, GA	**W** 14–0		
October 15	**Texas**	Add-Ran Christian	Waco, TX	**W** 16–0		
October 15	**Nashville**	**Sewanee**	Hardee Field • Sewanee, TN	**SEW** 10–0		
October 20	Bingham Military School	**Clemson**	Calhoun, SC	**W** 55–0		

==== Week Four ====
Date	Visiting team	Home team	Site	Result	Attendance	Reference
October 22	Cincinnati	**Vanderbilt**	Dudley Field • Nashville, TN	**L** 0–10		
October 22	**Georgia Tech**	**Georgia**	Herty Field • Athens, GA	**UGA** 15–0		
October 22	Texas A&M	**Texas**	Varsity Athletic Field •Austin, TX	**W** 48–0		

==== Week Five ====
Date	Visiting team	Home team	Site	Result	Attendance	Reference
October 29	**Kentucky State**	Louisville YMCA	League Park • Louisville, KY	**W** 16–0		
October 29	Galveston High School	**Texas**	Varsity Athletic Field • Austin, TX	**W** 17–0		
October 29	**Vanderbilt**	**Georgia**	Piedmont Park • Atlanta, GA	**UGA** 4–0	2,000	

==== Week Six ====
Date	Visiting team	Home team	Site	Result	Attendance	Reference
November 5	Centre	**Kentucky State**	Lexington, KY	**W** 6–0		
November 5	Add-Ran Christian	**Texas**	Varsity Athletic Field • Austin, TX	**W** 29–0		
November 5	**Georgia Tech**	**Auburn**	Drill Field • Auburn, AL	**AUB** 29–6		
November 5	**Nashville**	**Vanderbilt**	Dudley Field • Nashville, TN	**VAN** 5–0		
November 10	**Sewanee**	**Texas**	Varsity Athletic Field • Austin, TX	**SEW** 4–0		

==== Week Seven ====
Date	Visiting team	Home team	Site	Result	Attendance	Reference
November 8	160th Indiana	**Kentucky State**	Lexington, KY	**W** 17–0		
November 12	**Sewanee**	Southern Athletic Club	Athletic Park • New Orleans, LA	**W** 21–0		
November 12	**Vanderbilt**	Virginia	Fontaine Ferry Park • Louisville, KY	**L** 18–0		
November 12	North Carolina	**Georgia**	Central City Park • Macon, GA	**L** 0–44		
November 14	North Carolina	**Auburn**	Drill Field • Auburn, AL	**L** 0–24		
November 17	**Clemson**	South Carolina	Columbia, SC	**W** 24–0		

==== Week Eight ====
Date	Visiting team	Home team	Site	Result	Attendance	Reference
November 19	New Castle Athletic Club	**Kentucky State**	Lexington, KY	**W** 36–0		

==== Week Nine ====
Date	Visiting team	Home team	Site	Result	Attendance	Reference
November 24	**Auburn**	**Georgia**	Piedmont Park • Atlanta, GA	**AUB** 18–17		
November 24	**Clemson**	**Georgia Tech**	Baseball Park • Augusta, GA	**CLEM** 23–0	500	
November 24	Dallas	**Texas**	Varsity Athletic Field • Austin, TX	**W** 26–0		
November 25	**Sewanee**	**Vanderbilt**	Dudley Field • Nashville, TN	**SEW** 19–4	4,000	

==== Week Ten ====
Date	Visiting team	Home team	Site	Result	Attendance	Reference
December 12	**Ole Miss**	**Tulane**	Tulane Athletic Field • New Orleans, LA	**TUL** 14–9		
December 17	St. Thomas Hall	**Ole Miss**	Oxford, MS	**W** 9–2		
December 17	**LSU**	**Tulane**	State Field • Baton Rouge, LA	**LSU** 37–0		

== All-Southern team ==
W. A. Lambeth's All-Southern team:

Position	Name	Team
QB	Frank O. Rogers	North Carolina
HB	Jim MacRae	North Carolina
HB	Jack Dye	Vanderbilt
FB	A. Clarence Jones	Georgia
E	H. T. Summersgill	Virginia
T	John Loyd	Virginia
G	William S. Fitzgerald	Vanderbilt
C	John L. Templeman	Virginia
G	James Davis	Virginia'
T	Frank Bennett	North Carolina
E	Herman Koehler	North Carolina
