= List of Sewanee Tigers head football coaches =

The Sewanee Tigers college football team represents Sewanee: The University of the South (Sewanee) in National Collegiate Athletic Association (NCAA) Division III. The school is a founding member of the Southern Athletic Association (SAA), a conference chartered in 2011 by seven former members of the Southern Collegiate Athletic Conference (SCAC) and one other invited member that played its first season in 2012. Sewanee had been a charter member of the SCAC as well. The program has had 33 head coaches and one interim head coach since it began play during the 1891 season. Since December 2025, Joe Freitag has served as Sewanee's head coach.

The team has played more than 970 games over 116 seasons. In that time, Seven coaches won conference championships: John Gere Jayne, Billy Suter, and Harris G. Cope won a combined three as a member of the Southern Intercollegiate Athletic Association (SIAA); and Shirley Majors, Horace Moore, Bill Samko and John Windham won a combined ten as a member of the CAC/SCAC. Majors is the leader in seasons coached and games won, with 172 victories during his 21 years with the program. James John Quill and Arthur G. Erwin have the highest winning percentage of those who have coached more than one game, with .889. Robert Black has the lowest winning percentage of those who have coached more than one game, with .105. Of the 30 different head coaches who have led the Tigers, and Harvey Harman has been inducted as head coaches into the College Football Hall of Fame in South Bend, Indiana.

== Key ==
Key to symbols in coaches list
General		Overall		Conference		Postseason (Note: Although the first Rose Bowl Game was played in 1902, it has been continuously played since the 1916 game, and is recognized as the oldest bowl game by the NCAA. "—" indicates any season prior to 1916 when postseason games were not played.)	
No.	Order of coaches (Note: A running total of the number of head coaches, with coaches who served separate tenures being counted only once. Interim head coaches are represented with "Int" and are not counted in the running total. "—" indicates the team played but either without a coach or no coach is on record. "X" indicates an interim year without play.)	GC	Games coached	CW	Conference wins	PW	Postseason wins
DC	Division championships	OW	Overall wins	CL	Conference losses	PL	Postseason losses
CC	Conference championships	OL	Overall losses	CT	Conference ties	PT	Postseason ties
NC	National championships	OT	Overall ties (Note: Overtime rules in college football were introduced in 1996, making ties impossible in the period since.)	C%	Conference winning percentage		
†	Elected to the College Football Hall of Fame	O%	Overall winning percentage (Note: When computing the win–loss percentage, a tie counts as half a win and half a loss.)				

== Coaches ==
List of head football coaches showing season(s) coached, overall records, conference records, championships and selected awards (Note: Statistics correct as of the end of the 2024 college football season.)
No.	Name	Term (Note: Sewanee did not field teams from the 1942 through 1945 seasons due to World War II.)	GC	OW	OL	OT	O%	CW	CL	CT	C%	CC	NC	Awards
1	F. G. Sweat	1891–1893	16	8	6	2	0.563	—	—	—	—	—	0	—
2	Herbert C. Foss	1894	8	3	5	0	0.375	—	—	—	—	—	0	—
3	R. M. Reynolds	1895	5	2	2	1	0.500	0	2	1	0.167	0	0	—
4	Eddie Blair	1896	6	3	3	0	0.500	1	3	0	0.250	0	0	—
5	John Gere Jayne	1897–1898	9	5	3	1	0.611	2	2	1	0.500	1	0	—
6	Billy Suter	1899–1901	28	22	3	3	0.839	17	2	1	0.875	1	0	—
7	L. W. Boynton	1902	9	7	2	0	0.778	4	2	0	0.667	0	0	—
8	George S. Whitney	1903–1904	16	14	2	0	0.875	9	2	0	0.818	0	0	—
9	Willard Hyatt	1905	7	4	2	1	0.643	2	1	1	0.625	0	0	—
10	James John Quill	1906	9	8	1	0	0.889	5	1	0	0.833	0	0	—
11	Arthur G. Erwin	1907	9	8	1	0	0.889	6	1	0	0.857	0	0	—
12	Harry Van Surdam	1908	8	4	1	3	0.688	2	1	1	0.625	0	0	—
13	Harris G. Cope	1909–1916	68	43	18	7	0.684	19	13	6	0.579	1	0	—
14	Charles Best	1917–1918	13	7	4	2	0.615	4	3	2	0.556	0	0	—
15	Earl Abell	1919–1920	17	7	9	1	0.441	1	7	1	0.167	0	0	—
16	John Nicholson Nicholson	1921–1922	16	9	6	1	0.594	4	5	1	0.450	0	0	—
17	M. S. Bennett	1923–1928	52	21	29	2	0.423	6	21	0	0.222	0	0	—
18	W. H. Kirkpatrick	1928–1929	11	2	7	2	0.273	0	6	1	0.071	0	0	—
19	Harvey Harman^{†}	1930	10	3	6	1	0.350	1	4	0	0.200	0	0	—
20	Harry E. Clark	1931–1939	80	21	56	3	0.281	3	45	0	0.063	0	0	—
21	Jenks Gillem	1940–1941	15	5	10	0	0.333	0	1	0	.000	0	0	—
22	William C. White	1946–1953	64	38	23	3	0.617	—	—	—	—	—	0	—
23	Ernie Williamson	1954–1956	25	2	22	1	0.100	—	—	—	—	—	0	—
24	Shirley Majors	1957–1977	172	93	74	5	0.555	36	25	0	0.590	4	0	—
25	Horace Moore	1978–1986	80	38	42	0	0.475	23	17	0	0.575	3	0	—
26	Bill Samko	1987–1993	63	35	27	1	0.563	14	14	1	0.500	2	0	—
27	Al Logan	1994–1995	18	4	14	0	0.222	2	6	0	0.250	0	0	—
28	John Windham	1996–2006	106	45	61	—	0.425	24	39	—	0.381	1	0	—
29	Robert Black	2007–2010	38	4	34	—	0.105	1	26	—	0.037	0	0	—
30	Tommy Laurendine	2011–2016	60	15	45	—	0.250	5	27	—	0.156	0	0	—
31	Travis Rundle	2017–2022	51	9	42	—	0.176	5	33	—	0.132	0	0	—
32	Andy McCollum	2023–2025	29	8	21	—	0.276	4	17	—	0.190	0	0	—
Int	Tracy Malone (Note: Andy McCollum was fired after an 3–6 start to the 2025 season and was replaced by Tracy Malone who served as interim head coach for the final game of the season.)	2025	1	0	1	—	.000	0	1	—	.000	0	0	—
33	Joe Freitag	2026–present	0	0	0	—	–	0	0	—	–	0	0	—
