= 1898 Georgia Bulldogs football team =

American college football season

1898 Georgia Bulldogs football
- Conference: Southern Intercollegiate Athletic Association
- Record: 4–2 (3–1 SIAA)
- Head coach: Charles McCarthy (2nd season)
- Captain: H. S. Walden
- Home stadium: Herty Field

1898 Southern Intercollegiate Athletic Association football standings
	Conf.					Overall
Team	W		L		T	W		L		T
Sewanee	3	–	0	–	0	4	–	0	–	0
Auburn	2	–	0	–	0	2	–	1	–	0
LSU	1	–	0	–	0	1	–	0	–	0
Georgia	3	–	1	–	0	4	–	2	–	0
Clemson	1	–	1	–	0	3	–	1	–	0
Tulane	1	–	1	–	0	1	–	1	–	0
Vanderbilt	1	–	2	–	0	1	–	5	–	0
Mississippi	0	–	1	–	0	1	–	1	–	0
Texas	0	–	1	–	0	5	–	1	–	0
Nashville	0	–	2	–	0	0	–	2	–	0
Georgia Tech	0	–	3	–	0	0	–	4	–	0
Kentucky State#	0	–	0	–	0	7	–	0	–	0
Cumberland (TN)	0	–	0	–	0	0	–	0	–	0
SW Presbyterian	0	–	0	–	0	0	–	0	–	0
$ – Conference champion; # – State champion

The 1898 Georgia Bulldogs football team represented the University of Georgia during the 1898 Southern Intercollegiate Athletic Association football season. The Bulldogs competed as a member of the Southern Intercollegiate Athletic Association (SIAA) and compiled a 4–2 record. The team got off to 4–0 start that included a second straight victory over Georgia Tech, but finished with losses to Auburn and North Carolina. 1898 also marked the first time the Bulldogs beat Vanderbilt in three tries. This was the team's second and final season under the guidance of head coach Charles McCarthy.

The backfield was led by quarterbacks "Kid" Huff and F. K. McCutcheon, and fullback A. Clarence Jones, one of the south's best punters. Jones was selected All-Southern by W. A. Lambeth of Virginia. Quarterback Huff saved a touchdown in the Vanderbilt game when he tackled the large Wallace Crutchfield.

== Schedule ==
Date	Opponent	Site	Result	Attendance	Source
October 8	Clemson	Herty Field; Athens, GA (rivalry)	W 20–8		
October 15	Atlanta Athletic Club*	Herty Field; Athens, GA	W 14–0		
October 22	Georgia Tech	Herty Field; Athens, GA (rivalry)	W 15–0		
October 29	vs. Vanderbilt	Piedmont Park; Atlanta, GA (rivalry)	W 4–0	2,000	
November 12	vs. North Carolina*	Central City Park; Macon, GA	L 44–0		
November 24	vs. Auburn	Piedmont Park; Atlanta, GA (rivalry)	L 18–17		
*Non-conference game
