= 1963 Sewanee Tigers football team =

American college football season

1963 Sewanee Tigers football

CAC champion
- Conference: College Athletic Conference
- Record: 8–0 (4–0 CAC)
- Head coach: Shirley Majors (7th season)
- Captain: Bob Davis
- Home stadium: Hardee Field

1963 College Athletic Conference football standings
	Conf.					Overall
Team	W		L		T	W		L		T
Sewanee $	4	–	0	–	0	8	–	0	–	0
Washington and Lee	2	–	1	–	0	5	–	3	–	0
Washington University	1	–	1	–	0	6	–	2	–	1
Centre	1	–	2	–	0	3	–	5	–	0
Southwestern (TN)	0	–	4	–	0	2	–	5	–	1
$ – Conference champion

The 1963 Sewanee Tigers football team was an American football team that represented Sewanee: The University of the South as a member of the College Athletic Conference during the 1963 NCAA College Division football season. In their seventh season under head coach Shirley Majors, the Tigers compiled a perfect 8–0 record (4–0 in conference games), won the CAC championship, and outscored opponents by a total of 275 to 45. It was one of four undefeated seasons in Sewanee football history, the others being 1898, 1899, and 1958. It was also the first of Sewanee's 12 CAC/SCAC championships.

Tailback Martin Luther "M.L." Agnew was a threat as a passer (507 yards) and runner (841 yards), led the team in total offense, and won first-team honors on the 1963 Little All-America college football team. Larry Majors, son of the head coach, set a school record with an average of 7.0 yards per carry during the 1963 season.

In 2010, the 1963 team was inducted as a group into the Sewanee Athletics Hall of Fame. This followed the induction of the 1899 football team in 2004 and the 1958 football team in 2008.

The team played its home games at Hardee Field in Sewanee, Tennessee.

== Schedule ==
Date	Opponent	Site	Result	Attendance	Source
September 28	at Millsaps*	Alumni Field; Jackson, MS	W 27–0	1,000	
October 5	Hampden–Sydney*	Hardee Field; Sewanee, TN	W 49–0	1,200	
October 12	at Austin*	Sherman, TX	W 39–19	1,000	
October 19	Randolph–Macon*^{†}	Hardee Field; Sewanee, TN	W 48–0		
October 26	at Centre	Danville, KY	W 35–7		
November 2	at Southwestern (TN)	Hodges Field; Memphis, TN (Edmund Orgill Trophy)	W 28–0	1,447	
November 9	Washington and Lee	Hardee Field; Sewanee, TN	W 35–6		
November 16	Washington University	Hardee Field; Sewanee, TN	W 14–13		
*Non-conference game; ^{†}Homecoming
