= A. C. Jones =

A. C. Jones may refer to:

- Arlie C. Jones, American football player and coach; played for University of Virginia
- A. Clarence Jones, American football player for the University of Georgia

== See also ==
- Jones (surname)
