= 1898 Georgia Tech football team =

American college football season

1898 Georgia Tech football
- Conference: Southern Intercollegiate Athletic Association
- Record: 0–4 (0–3 SIAA)
- Head coach: J. B. Wood (3rd season)
- Home stadium: Piedmont Park

1898 Southern Intercollegiate Athletic Association football standings
| | Conf. | | | | | Overall |
| Team | W | | L | | T | W | | L | | T |
|---|---|---|---|---|---|---|---|---|---|---|
| Sewanee | 3 | – | 0 | – | 0 | 4 | – | 0 | – | 0 |
| Auburn | 2 | – | 0 | – | 0 | 2 | – | 1 | – | 0 |
| LSU | 1 | – | 0 | – | 0 | 1 | – | 0 | – | 0 |
| Georgia | 3 | – | 1 | – | 0 | 4 | – | 2 | – | 0 |
| Clemson | 1 | – | 1 | – | 0 | 3 | – | 1 | – | 0 |
| Tulane | 1 | – | 1 | – | 0 | 1 | – | 1 | – | 0 |
| Vanderbilt | 1 | – | 2 | – | 0 | 1 | – | 5 | – | 0 |
| Mississippi | 0 | – | 1 | – | 0 | 1 | – | 1 | – | 0 |
| Texas | 0 | – | 1 | – | 0 | 5 | – | 1 | – | 0 |
| Nashville | 0 | – | 2 | – | 0 | 0 | – | 2 | – | 0 |
| Georgia Tech | 0 | – | 3 | – | 0 | 0 | – | 4 | – | 0 |
| Kentucky State# | 0 | – | 0 | – | 0 | 7 | – | 0 | – | 0 |
| Cumberland (TN) | 0 | – | 0 | – | 0 | 0 | – | 0 | – | 0 |
| SW Presbyterian | 0 | – | 0 | – | 0 | 0 | – | 0 | – | 0 |
$ – Conference champion; # – State champion

The 1898 Georgia Tech football team represented the Georgia School of Technology during the 1898 college football season.

The team was coached by J. B. Wood, a Georgia Tech professor who was in his third year coaching the team. Furlow was selected as manager. Enough players came out for the team that Tech was able to field a second and third team, both of which played scrimmages against local high schools. The varsity team played several practice games and Wood remarked that the team was well coached and had played well together as a team.

Georgia Tech's home games were played at Piedmont Park, which was being renovated with a new grandstand and track. Georgia Tech and Georgia both made agreements to exclusively use Piedmont Park for all football and baseball games for the 1898 and 1899 seasons.

Georgia Tech's small season led many to consider the 1898 to be relatively weak compared to other teams in the region and press coverage suggests that interest in Tech's football program was markedly lighter than in previous years. The season was far from successful for Georgia Tech who finished 0–4, the first of three straight winless seasons. Tech scored in only one of the four games.

== Schedule ==
| Date | Time | Opponent | Site | Result | Attendance | Source |
|---|---|---|---|---|---|---|
| October 8 | 3:30 p.m. | Atlanta Athletic Club (Note: The Georgia Tech football information guide erroneously omits this game.)* | Piedmont Park; Atlanta, GA | L 0–11 | | |
| October 22 (Note: The Georgia Tech football information guide erroneously lists this game as occurring on December 22.) | | at Georgia | Alumni Athletic Field; Athens, GA (rivalry) | L 0–15 | | |
| November 5 | | at Auburn | Drill Field; Auburn, AL (rivalry) | L 4–29 | | |
| November 24 | | vs. Clemson | Old Baseball Park; Augusta, GA (rivalry) | L 0–23 | 500 | |
*Non-conference game

== Game summaries ==
Atlanta Athletic Club Atlantans (0–0–0) at Georgia Tech Techs (0–0–0)

| Quarter | 1 | 2 | Total |
|---|---|---|---|
| Atlanta (Note: Scoring for each half is not known.) | 0 | 11 | 11 |
| Georgia Tech | 0 | 0 | 0 |

at Piedmont Park • Atlanta, Georgia

- Date: Saturday, October 8, 1898
- Game time: 3:30 p.m.
- Game attendance: "A large number of the lovers of the sport"
- Referee: Unknown

Georgia Tech's first game of the 1898 season was against the Atlanta Athletic Club, a team formed by former players of Georgia Tech and Georgia. This was the first match-up between the two teams. The game was expected to be very evenly matched by teams who were in good shape entering the season. Georgia Tech's coach, J. B. Wood, umpired the game and a former Georgia Tech player, Charles Gavan, was the referee. Atlanta A. C. won the game 11–0 carried by their fullback, Chancelor Thornton. Tech's right halfback, Clark, was described as the best player on the Tech team.

Georgia Tech Techs (0–1–0) at Georgia 'Varsity (2–0–0)

| Quarter | 1 | 2 | Total |
|---|---|---|---|
| Georgia Tech | 0 | 0 | 0 |
| Georgia | 15 | 0 | 15 |

at Alumni Athletic Field • Athens, Georgia

- Date: Saturday, October 22, 1898
- Game time: Afternoon
- Game attendance: Unknown
- Referee: Unknown

Georgia came into the rivalry game with a 2–0–0 record, having already defeated Clemson and Atlanta Athletic Club, and was considered one of the strongest teams in the region. The teams had split their two previous meetings, with Georgia winning their last match-up in 1897. Georgia scored three touchdowns in the first half, including a 106-yard run made by its left end, McCutcheon. The Techs had the ball on Georgia's five-yard line, but fumbled on the ensuing play, allowing McCutcheon to pick up the ball in the endzone and run it back all the way for a touchdown. Georgia Tech's defense prevented any scoring in the second, but its offense failed to score any points.

Georgia Tech Techs (0–2–0) at Auburn Tigers (0–0–0)

| Quarter | 1 | 2 | Total |
|---|---|---|---|
| Georgia Tech | 6 | 0 | 6 |
| Auburn (Note: Scoring of Auburn for each half is not known.) | 0 | 29 | 29 |

at Drill Field • Auburn, Alabama

- Date: Saturday, November 5, 1898
- Game time: Unknown
- Game attendance: Unknown
- Referee: Billy Williams

Auburn was playing its first game of the season and was considered one of the southern football powers. Auburn had beaten Georgia Tech in all three previous meetings by a combined score of 160 to 0. Tech started off the game strong with Erskine making a 65-yard fumble return for a touchdown five minutes into the game. However, Auburn's line tightened up and Georgia Tech was unable to stop Auburn's fast offensive attack. Auburn scored six unanswered touchdowns and won the game 29 to 4.

Clemson Tigers (2–1–0) vs. Georgia Tech Techs (0–3–0)

| Quarter | 1 | 2 | Total |
|---|---|---|---|
| Clemson (Note: Scoring for each half is not known.) | 0 | 23 | 23 |
| Georgia Tech | 0 | 0 | 0 |

at Old Baseball Park • Augusta, Georgia

- Date: Thursday, November 24, 1898
- Game time: Afternoon
- Game attendance: 500
- Referee: Unknown

This game marked the first contest in the long-standing rivalry between Georgia Tech and Clemson. Clemson came into the game with a record of 2–1–0, having lost to Georgia in its opening match-up of the season. The game was played in the neutral city of Augusta, Georgia, but was watched by fans of both schools and by soldiers from nearby Camp McKenzie. Throughout the game, hundreds of men in the crowd swarmed around the players on the field and interfered so that the progress of the game had to be stopped. Fans in the grandstand were unable to see the plays on the field and many abandoned the game in disgust.

Clemson clearly outclassed the Techs as their team was heavier and Tech was unable to get in effective tackles. Clemson scored very early into the game by easily pushing through Georgia Tech's line. Georgia Tech came within two feet of scoring but were ultimately stopped short. Clemson scored five touchdowns and three goals and won the game 23 to 0.

== Players ==
Georgia Tech Techs 1898 game starters
| | Atlanta | Georgia | Auburn | Clemson |
|---|---|---|---|---|
| Left End | Good | | Hart | |
| Left Tackle | Pete Wooley | | Pete Wooley | |
| Left Guard | Leigh | | Joe Pelham | |
| Center | Goete | | Morris Yow | |
| Right Guard | Morris Yow | | Powell | |
| Right Tackle | W. J. Holman | | W. J. Holman | |
| Right End | Harris | Erskine | Erskine | Erskine |
| Quarterback | Kaufman | | Kaufman | |
| Left Halfback | J. C. Crawford | | J. C. Crawford | |
| Right Halfback | Clark | | Clark | |
| Fullback | Gordon | | George Merritt | |
| Substitutes | Maddox • Owen | | | |
