= John Lombard =

American football coach (1872–1948)

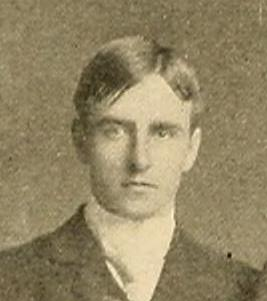
- Lombard as Tulane coach in 1898

Biographical details
- Born: December 17, 1872; New Iberia, Louisiana, U.S.
- Died: December 4, 1948 (aged 75); Baton Rouge, Louisiana, U.S.

Playing career
- 1893: Tulane

Coaching career (HC unless noted)
- 1898: Tulane

Head coaching record
- Overall: 1–1

John Edward Lombard (December 17, 1872 – December 4, 1948) was an American college football coach and player, professor, education official, and engineer. He served as the head coach of the Tulane University football team in 1898. Lombard attended Tulane University, where he organized the school's first football team and served as its captain.

== Biography ==
Lombard was born on Dec. 17, 1872 in New Iberia, Iberia Parish, Louisiana the son of Edward Homer Lombard and Laura Virginia Levy. He attended Tulane University, where he organized and played on the first football team. He served as the team captain, and in the game against Louisiana State, another first-year program, he faced Ruffin Pleasant, LSU captain and future Louisiana governor. That game was also noteworthy in that the Tulane coach, T. L. Bayne, coached both sides. Lombard graduated from Tulane with a Master of Engineering degree. He was a member of Alpha Tau Omega.

In 1896, Lombard was appointed to the Tulane faculty, and he taught as an assistant professor of mathematics. He coached the football team in 1898 and led the Olive and Blue to a 1–1 record. That season consisted of a 14–9 victory against Ole Miss and a 37–0 defeat at the hands of Louisiana State. In 1899, he was pursuing graduate studies in railway engineering at the University of Wisconsin. The following year, he was on the Tulane Athletic Association advisory board as a faculty member.

By 1912, Lombard held the post of Physical Director of the New Orleans public schools. In 1934, he was serving on the state Board of Education in Baton Rouge, Louisiana. In 1940, he was the Louisiana State Supervisor of Teacher Training and Certification.

Lombard died in 1948.

== Head coaching record ==
Year	Team	Overall	Conference	Standing	Bowl/playoffs
Tulane Olive and Blue (Southern Intercollegiate Athletic Association) (1898)
1898	Tulane	1–1	1–1	T–5th	
Tulane:		1–1	1–1		
Total:		1–1			
