= 1898 Clemson Tigers football team =

American college football season

1898 Clemson Tigers football
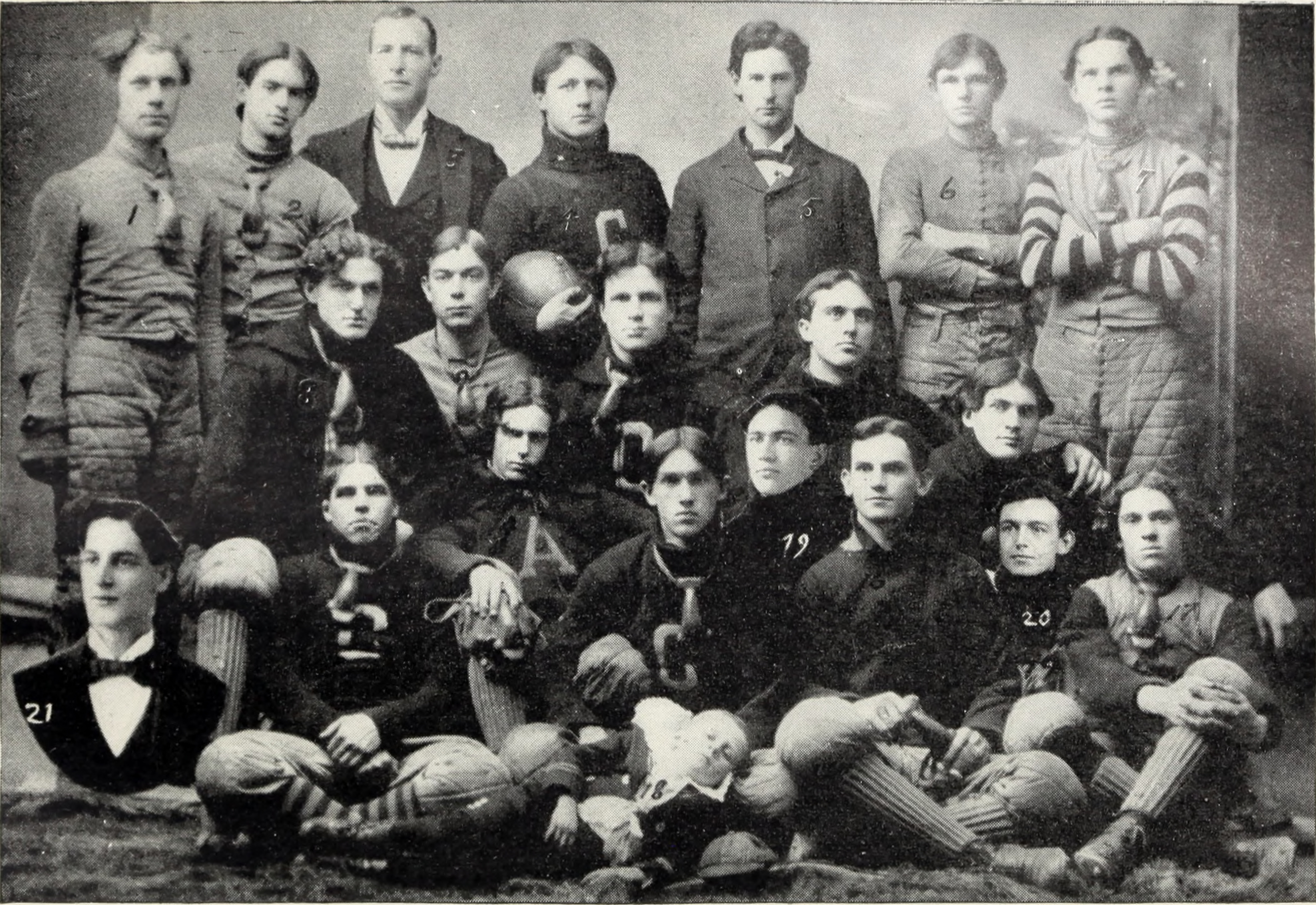
- Conference: Southern Intercollegiate Athletic Association
- Record: 3–1 (1–1 SIAA)
- Head coach: John Penton (1st season)
- Captain: Shack Shealy

1898 Southern Intercollegiate Athletic Association football standings
	Conf.					Overall
Team	W		L		T	W		L		T
Sewanee	3	–	0	–	0	4	–	0	–	0
Auburn	2	–	0	–	0	2	–	1	–	0
LSU	1	–	0	–	0	1	–	0	–	0
Georgia	3	–	1	–	0	4	–	2	–	0
Clemson	1	–	1	–	0	3	–	1	–	0
Tulane	1	–	1	–	0	1	–	1	–	0
Vanderbilt	1	–	2	–	0	1	–	5	–	0
Mississippi	0	–	1	–	0	1	–	1	–	0
Texas	0	–	1	–	0	5	–	1	–	0
Nashville	0	–	2	–	0	0	–	2	–	0
Georgia Tech	0	–	3	–	0	0	–	4	–	0
Kentucky State#	0	–	0	–	0	7	–	0	–	0
Cumberland (TN)	0	–	0	–	0	0	–	0	–	0
SW Presbyterian	0	–	0	–	0	0	–	0	–	0
$ – Conference champion; # – State champion

The 1898 Clemson Tigers football team represented Clemson Agricultural College—now known as Clemson University–during the 1898 Southern Intercollegiate Athletic Association football season. The Tigers completed their third season as an independent with a record of 3–1, with wins over Bingham Military School, South Carolina, and Georgia Tech, and a loss to Georgia. For the first time, Clemson played a game at home, on October 20 against Bingham Military School, and a neutral site game at Augusta, Georgia against Georgia Tech. John Penton served as the team's coach for his first season while Shack Shealy was the captain.

== Schedule ==
Date	Opponent	Site	Result	Source
October 8	at Georgia	Herty Field; Athens, GA (rivalry)	L 8–20	
October 20	Bingham Military School*	Calhoun, SC	W 55–0	
November 17	at South Carolina*	Columbia, SC (rivalry)	W 24–0	
November 24	vs. Georgia Tech*	Augusta, GA (rivalry)	W 22–0	
*Non-conference game
