= Joe Majors =

American football player (1936–2007)

No. 22
- Position: Defensive back

Personal information
- Born: December 25, 1936; Lynchburg, Tennessee, U.S.
- Died: January 4, 2007 (aged 70); Nashville, Tennessee, U.S.
- Listed height: 6 ft 1 in (1.85 m)
- Listed weight: 190 lb (86 kg)

Career information
- High school: Huntland (Huntland, Tennessee)
- College: Florida State (1956–1959)
- NFL draft: 1960: undrafted

Career history
- Houston Oilers (1960)
- Stats at Pro Football Reference

Joe Inman Majors (December 25, 1936 – January 4, 2007) was an American football player, lobbyist, and politician. He played professionally for the Houston Oilers of American Football League (AFL). He played college football at Florida State University.

== Early life ==
Joe Inman Majors was born on December 25, 1936, in Lynchburg, Tennessee. He attended Huntland High School in Huntland, Tennessee.

== College career ==
Majors was a member of the Florida State Seminoles of Florida State University from 1956 to 1959 as a quarterback. He was a three-year letterman from 1957 to 1959. As a sophomore in 1957, he completed 20 of 49 passes (40.8%) for 206 yards, two touchdowns, and four interceptions. Majors recorded 26 completions on 71 passing attempta (36.6%) for 380 yards, three touchdowns, and six interceptions during the 1958 season while also scoring one rushing touchdown. His senior year in 1959, he completed 90 of 168 passes (53.6%) for 1,063 yards, six touchdowns, and seven interceptions while scoring three rushing touchdowns.

== Professional career ==
Majors signed with the Houston Oilers of the American Football League (AFL) on January 5, 1960, after going undrafted in the 1960 AFL draft. He played in one game for the Oilers during the 1960 season as a defensive back, before being released on September 13, 1960.

== Post-football career ==
Majors graduated from Vanderbilt University Law School. In 1965, he started his own law firm in Tullahoma, Tennessee. He was the Tullahoma city attorney from 1965 to 1968. He was a Democrat in the Tennessee House of Representatives from 1969 to 1971, serving Coffee, Franklin, and Grundy counties. Majors was later a lobbyist for Community Loans of America, the Tennessee Consumer Finance Association, the Tennessee Hotel and Lodging Association, the Tennessee Oil Marketers Association, and the Tennessee Pawnbrokers Association.

== Personal life ==
Majors' father, Shirley Majors, was a sports coach. His brothers Johnny, Billy, and Bobby also played football.

Majors died on January 4, 2007, at his home in Nashville, Tennessee at the age of 70. He had been sick for a few years due to heart problems and cancer.
