= 1898 Auburn Tigers football team =

American college football season

1898 Auburn Tigers football
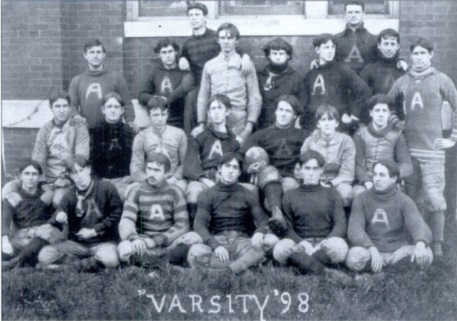
- Coach John Heisman is in the back wearing a cap.
- Conference: Southern Intercollegiate Athletic Association
- Record: 2–1 (2–0 SIAA)
- Head coach: John Heisman (4th season)
- Captain: George N. Mitcham

1898 Southern Intercollegiate Athletic Association football standings
	Conf.					Overall
Team	W		L		T	W		L		T
Sewanee	3	–	0	–	0	4	–	0	–	0
Auburn	2	–	0	–	0	2	–	1	–	0
LSU	1	–	0	–	0	1	–	0	–	0
Georgia	3	–	1	–	0	4	–	2	–	0
Clemson	1	–	1	–	0	3	–	1	–	0
Tulane	1	–	1	–	0	1	–	1	–	0
Vanderbilt	1	–	2	–	0	1	–	5	–	0
Mississippi	0	–	1	–	0	1	–	1	–	0
Texas	0	–	1	–	0	5	–	1	–	0
Nashville	0	–	2	–	0	0	–	2	–	0
Georgia Tech	0	–	3	–	0	0	–	4	–	0
Kentucky State#	0	–	0	–	0	7	–	0	–	0
Cumberland (TN)	0	–	0	–	0	0	–	0	–	0
SW Presbyterian	0	–	0	–	0	0	–	0	–	0
$ – Conference champion; # – State champion

The 1898 Auburn Tigers football team represented Auburn University in the 1898 Southern Intercollegiate Athletic Association football season. It was the Tigers' seventh season and they competed as a member of the Southern Intercollegiate Athletic Association (SIAA). The team was led by head coach John Heisman, in his fourth year, and finished with a record of two wins and one loss (2–1 overall, 2–1 in the SIAA).

== Schedule ==
Date	Opponent	Site	Result	Source
November 5	Georgia Tech	Drill Field; Auburn, AL (rivalry)	W 29–4	
November 14	North Carolina	Drill Field; Auburn, AL	L 0–24	
November 24	vs. Georgia	Piedmont Park; Atlanta, GA (rivalry)	W 18–17	
