= John L. Templeman =

American football player and attorney (1872–1936)

- Born: March 11, 1872; Axminster, England
- Died: October 19, 1936 (aged 64); Butte, Montana
- Occupation: attorney
- Football career

Profile
- Position: Center

Career information
- College: Grinnell (1896); Virginia (1897–1899)

Awards and highlights
- All-Southern (1898)

John L. Templeman (March 11, 1872 – October 19, 1936) was a college football player and prominent attorney.

== Grinnell College ==
Templeman attended Grinnell College (then called Iowa College) before 1897.

== University of Virginia ==
Templeman was a prominent center for the Virginia Cavaliers football team of the University of Virginia. He also kicked field goals.

=== 1897 ===
Templeman played in the game in which Richard Von Albade Gammon died in 1897.

=== 1898 ===
Templeman was selected All-Southern by W. A. Lambeth in Outing.

== Butte ==
He came to Butte, Montana in 1900, and in 1903 was appointed city attorney.
