= Bobby Majors =

American football player (born 1949)

No. 44, 24
- Position: Defensive back

Personal information
- Born: July 7, 1949 (age 77); Lynchburg, Tennessee, U.S.
- Listed height: 6 ft 1 in (1.85 m)
- Listed weight: 193 lb (88 kg)

Career information
- High school: Franklin County (Winchester, Tennessee)
- College: Tennessee
- NFL draft: 1972: 3rd round, 76th overall pick

Career history
- Philadelphia Eagles (1972); Cleveland Browns (1972); Memphis Southmen (1974)

Awards and highlights
- Unanimous All-American (1971); Second-team All-American (1970); 2× First-team All-SEC (1970, 1971)
- Stats at Pro Football Reference

Robert Owen Majors (born July 7, 1949) is an American former professional football player who was a defensive back for one season with the Cleveland Browns of the National Football League (NFL). He played college football for the Tennessee Volunteers, earning unanimous All-American honors in 1971. Majors was selected by the Philadelphia Eagles in the third round of the 1972 NFL draft. He was also a member of the Memphis Southmen of the World Football League (WFL). He is the younger brother of former Tennessee head coach Johnny Majors.

== College career ==
In 1970, Majors set the single-season Tennessee Volunteers record for interceptions with ten and the Volunteers led the NCAA with 36 interceptions. He returned punts and kicks as a member of the Volunteers. He holds the school records for career punt returns with 117 and career punt return yardage with 1,163. Majors had 13 career interceptions at Tennessee. He was named to the University of Tennessee 100-year team as the "Defensive Back of All Time". He was a consensus All-American in 1971. He was named All-SEC in 1970 and 1971. Majors was named to the 2011 SEC Football Legends Class.

== Professional career ==
Majors was selected by the Philadelphia Eagles in the third round, with the 76th overall pick, of the 1972 NFL draft. He signed with the Eagles in May 1972. He was signed by the NFL's Cleveland Browns in October 1972. Majors appeared in nine games for the Browns in 1972. He spent the 1974 season with the Memphis Southmen of the WFL.

== Personal life ==
Bobby's four brothers Johnny, Billy, Joe, and Larry also played football. Their father, Shirley Majors, was a college football coach at Sewanee.
