= 1898 Tulane Olive and Blue football team =

American college football season

1898 Tulane Olive and Blue football
- Conference: Southern Intercollegiate Athletic Association
- Record: 1–1 (1–1 SIAA)
- Head coach: John Lombard (1st season)
- Captain: Charles Eshleman
- Home stadium: Tulane Athletic Field

1898 Southern Intercollegiate Athletic Association football standings
	Conf.					Overall
Team	W		L		T	W		L		T
Sewanee	3	–	0	–	0	4	–	0	–	0
Auburn	2	–	0	–	0	2	–	1	–	0
LSU	1	–	0	–	0	1	–	0	–	0
Georgia	3	–	1	–	0	4	–	2	–	0
Clemson	1	–	1	–	0	3	–	1	–	0
Tulane	1	–	1	–	0	1	–	1	–	0
Vanderbilt	1	–	2	–	0	1	–	5	–	0
Mississippi	0	–	1	–	0	1	–	1	–	0
Texas	0	–	1	–	0	5	–	1	–	0
Nashville	0	–	2	–	0	0	–	2	–	0
Georgia Tech	0	–	3	–	0	0	–	4	–	0
Kentucky State#	0	–	0	–	0	7	–	0	–	0
Cumberland (TN)	0	–	0	–	0	0	–	0	–	0
SW Presbyterian	0	–	0	–	0	0	–	0	–	0
$ – Conference champion; # – State champion

The 1898 Tulane Olive and Blue football team was an American football team that represented Tulane University as a member of the Southern Intercollegiate Athletic Association (SIAA) during the 1898 college football season. In their first year under head coach John Lombard, the team compiled an overall record of 1–1.

== Schedule ==
Date	Opponent	Site	Result	Source
December 12	Ole Miss	Tulane Athletic Field; New Orleans, LA (rivalry)	W 14–9	
December 17	at LSU	State Field; Baton Rouge, LA (rivalry)	L 0–37	
