= Johnny Majors =

American football player and coach (1935–2020)

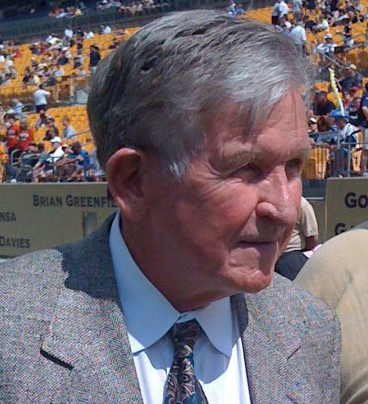
- Majors in 2009

Biographical details
- Born: May 21, 1935; Lynchburg, Tennessee, U.S.
- Died: June 3, 2020 (aged 85); Knoxville, Tennessee, U.S.

Playing career
- 1953–1956: Tennessee
- 1957: Montreal Alouettes
- Position: Halfback

Coaching career (HC unless noted)
- 1957: Tennessee (GA)
- 1958–1959: Tennessee (backfield)
- 1960–1963: Mississippi State (DB)
- 1964–1967: Arkansas (assistant)
- 1968–1972: Iowa State
- 1973–1976: Pittsburgh
- 1977–1992: Tennessee
- 1993–1996: Pittsburgh

Head coaching record
- Overall: 185–137–10
- Bowls: 9–6

Accomplishments and honors

Championships
- National (1976); 3 SEC (1985, 1989, 1990)

Awards
- UPI Player of the Year (1956); Unanimous All-American (1956); 2× SEC MVP (1955–1956); 2× First-team All-SEC (1955, 1956); Tennessee Volunteers No. 45 retired; Walter Camp Coach of the Year (1973); AFCA Coach of the Year (1976); Sporting News College Football COY (1976); SEC Coach of the Year (1985); Big Eight Coach of the Year (1971)
- College Football Hall of Fame; Inducted in 1987 (profile)

John Terrill Majors (May 21, 1935 – June 3, 2020) was an American professional football player and college coach. A standout halfback at the University of Tennessee, he was an All-American in 1956 and a two-time winner of the Southeastern Conference Most Valuable Player award, in 1955 and 1956. He finished second to Paul Hornung in voting for the Heisman Trophy in 1956. After playing one season in the Canadian Football League (CFL), Majors became a college assistant coach. He served as the head coach at Iowa State University (1968–1972), the University of Pittsburgh (1973–1976, 1993–1996), and Tennessee (1977–1992), compiling a career college football record of 185–137–10. His 1976 Pittsburgh squad won a national championship after capping a 12–0 season with a victory in the Sugar Bowl. Majors was inducted into the College Football Hall of Fame as a player in 1987.

== Playing career ==
Majors played high school football for the Huntland Hornets of Franklin County, Tennessee. They won the state championship in 1951. Majors' father, Shirley Majors, was the head coach at Huntland from 1949 to 1957 and then head coach at The University of the South, Sewanee, from 1957 to 1977. Majors also played alongside his brother, Joe, at Huntland. Joe played for Florida State University and professionally for the AFL's Houston Oilers. Billy played at Tennessee as well and professionally for the Buffalo Bills. Larry played at The University of the South contributing to an undefeated season for Sewanee in 1963 and later coached alongside his father, Shirley. Another brother, Bobby, also played at Tennessee and professionally for the Cleveland Browns. In all, Majors had four brothers, all of whom played football. Johnny was the oldest.

A triple-threat tailback at the University of Tennessee, one of the last schools to use the single-wing rather than some version of the T formation, Majors was an All-American and runner-up for the Heisman Trophy in 1956. Majors lost the Heisman Trophy to Paul Hornung, who starred for Notre Dame, which had a losing record (2–8). To date, this is the only time the Heisman Trophy has been awarded to a player on a losing team. Many fans of college football believe that Hornung won the Heisman because he played for the storied Notre Dame program, despite the team having a losing record.

He played for the Montreal Alouettes of the CFL in 1957 and then became an assistant coach at several schools.

== Coaching career ==
=== Iowa State ===
Majors was the 24th head football coach for the Iowa State University Cyclones located in Ames, Iowa and he held that position for five seasons, from 1968 until 1972. His career coaching record at Iowa State was 24–30–1. During his time at Iowa State he guided the Cyclones to their first ever bowl games in 1971 and 1972. Majors ranks tied for 9th at Iowa State in total wins and 13th in win percentage.

=== Pittsburgh (first stint) ===
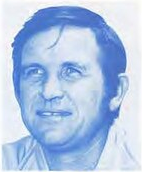
Majors as Pittsburgh's head coach in 1976

After Iowa State, Majors found his greatest success as coach of the University of Pittsburgh Panthers in 1973. In Pittsburgh, he recruited such greats as Heisman Trophy winner Tony Dorsett and Matt Cavanaugh, among others. The Panthers finished undefeated and won the national title in 1976, after which Majors went back to Tennessee, his alma mater. Majors also received National Coach of the Year honors for that season.

=== Tennessee ===
When Majors' plane landed in Knoxville on December 4, 1976, his celebrity status became evident as he signed autographs for many admirers, then quickly hit the road before a looming signing day deadline. He became Tennessee Vols' best salesman, conducting a whirlwind three-day recruiting juggernaut, during which he ate only two meals. Typically, he might go to a recruit's high school to meet a prospect and, for the courtesy of giving a few autographs, commandeer the principal's office to make phone calls to confirm his next visit. In one small Tennessee town, the local police knew of his visit and gave him a police escort to a recruit's home. The players he signed ended a five-year bowl drought for the Vols. At Tennessee, Majors achieved success in the 1980s and early 1990s winning three SEC championships in 1985, 1989, and 1990, but falling short of a national title. In 1989, the Majors-led Vols followed a 5–6 season with an 11–1 season, the largest turnaround in college football that year.

The University forced Majors to resign as Tennessee's football coach during the closing weeks of the 1992 football season. The Vols racked up a 3–0 record under interim coach Phillip Fulmer, a longtime Majors assistant, who steered the team while Majors was recovering from heart surgery. After the Vols went 2–3 following Majors' return, he suddenly was asked to resign during the week leading up to Tennessee's game at Memphis State. A Knoxville News Sentinel story reported that while Majors was recuperating from heart surgery, Fulmer allegedly exchanged 26 telephone calls with Tennessee Athletics Board member Bill Johnson, who had played with Majors in the mid-1950s at Tennessee. A strong contingent within the Tennessee fan base believes that it was behind-the-scenes maneuvering on the part of Fulmer, Johnson, athletics director Doug Dickey, and university president Joe Johnson that pushed Majors out. Other fans believe that Majors created his own problems in the summer of 1992 by, among other things, complaining about his current contract during a preseason publicity tour across the state. Many speculate it was likely a combination of all circumstances. Majors went 116–82–8 as the Volunteers head coach. He recorded the second most wins in school history at the time of his departure. As of 2026, he still ranks third for wins.

=== Pittsburgh (second stint) ===
After being forced to resign at Tennessee, he returned to his second home of the University of Pittsburgh to once again coach the Panthers. Throughout the mid-1990s, Majors tried to recreate the magic of 1976 at Pitt but achieved little success going 12–32 in four seasons from 1993 to 1996. He retired from coaching following the 1996 NCAA season and served at Pitt in the position of Special Assistant to the Athletic Director and Chancellor until the summer of 2007. A room on the second floor of the Pittsburgh Athletic Association adjacent to Pitt's campus is dedicated to him and displays memorabilia from his career.

== Death ==
Majors died on June 3, 2020, at his home in Knoxville, Tennessee. He was buried in the Lynchburg, Tennessee cemetery alongside his parents, Shirley Majors and Elizabeth Bobo Majors, and his brother Bill Majors.

== Honors ==
Knoxville named a street after Majors. Johnny Majors Drive is on the campus of the University of Tennessee and is the location of the school's practice facility. Actor Lee Majors borrowed Johnny Majors' last name to form his stage name. According to one account, Lee, whose real name is Harvey Lee Yeary, met Johnny and they became friends. Lee Majors was regularly seen on the sidelines during Johnny Majors' first tenure at Pittsburgh and during the early days at Tennessee.

== Head coaching record ==
Year	Team	Overall	Conference	Standing	Bowl/playoffs	Coaches^{#}	AP^{°}
Iowa State Cyclones (Big Eight Conference) (1968–1972)
1968	Iowa State	3–7	1–6	7th			
1969	Iowa State	3–7	1–6	7th			
1970	Iowa State	5–6	1–6	T–6th			
1971	Iowa State	8–4	4–3	4th	L Sun	17	
1972	Iowa State	5–6–1	2–4–1	5th	L Liberty		
Iowa State:		24–30–1	9–25–1				
Pittsburgh Panthers (NCAA Division I independent) (1973–1976)
1973	Pittsburgh	6–5–1			L Fiesta		
1974	Pittsburgh	7–4					
1975	Pittsburgh	8–4			W Sun	13	15
1976	Pittsburgh	12–0			W Sugar	1	1
Tennessee Volunteers (Southeastern Conference) (1977–1992)
1977	Tennessee	4–7	1–5	8th			
1978	Tennessee	5–5–1	3–3	T–4th			
1979	Tennessee	7–5	3–3	T–5th	L Astro-Bluebonnet		
1980	Tennessee	5–6	3–3	6th			
1981	Tennessee	8–4	3–3	T–4th	W Garden State		
1982	Tennessee	6–5–1	3–2–1	5th	L Peach		
1983	Tennessee	9–3	4–2	T–3rd	W Citrus		
1984	Tennessee	7–4–1	3–3	T–5th	L Sun		
1985	Tennessee	9–1–2	5–1	1st	W Sugar	4	4
1986	Tennessee	7–5	3–3	6th	W Liberty		
1987	Tennessee	10–2–1	4–1–1	3rd	W Peach	13	14
1988	Tennessee	5–6	3–4	T–6th			
1989	Tennessee	11–1	6–1	T–1st	W Cotton	5	5
1990	Tennessee	9–2–2	5–1–1	1st	W Sugar	7	8
1991	Tennessee	9–3	5–2	3rd	L Fiesta	15	14
1992	Tennessee	5–3*	3–3*	3rd (Eastern)*	*	12*	12*
Tennessee:		116–62–8	57–40–3	*Three early games and the Bowl game are credited to Phillip Fulmer.			
Pittsburgh Panthers (Big East Conference) (1993–1996)
1993	Pittsburgh	3–8	2–5	6th			
1994	Pittsburgh	3–8	2–5	7th			
1995	Pittsburgh	2–9	0–7	8th			
1996	Pittsburgh	4–7	3–4	5th			
Pittsburgh:		45–45–1	7–21				
Total:		185–137–10					
National championship Conference title Conference division title or championship game berth
^{#}Rankings from final Coaches Poll.; ^{°}Rankings from final AP Poll.

== Coaching tree ==
The following assistant coaches under Johnny Majors became college or professional head coaches:

- Lynn Amedee: UT Martin (1980–1981)
- Joe Avezzano: Oregon State (1980–1984)
- Bob Babich: North Dakota State (1997–2002)
- Kippy Brown: Memphis Maniax (2001)
- King Block: Arkansas State (1960–1962)
- Dom Capers: Carolina Panthers (1995–1998), Houston Texans (2002–2005)
- Curt Cignetti: IUP (2011–2016), Elon (2017–2018), James Madison (2019–2023), Indiana (2024–present)
- David Cutcliffe: Ole Miss (1998–2004), Duke (2008–2021)
- Daryl Dickey: Presbyterian (1997–2000), West Georgia (2008–2013)
- Phillip Fulmer: Tennessee (1992–2008)
- Ray Greene: North Carolina Central (1979), Alabama A&M (1979–1983, 1986–1988)
- Jon Gruden: Oakland Raiders (1998–2001), Tampa Bay Buccaneers (2002–2008), Oakland Raiders (2018–2021)
- Ray Hamilton: Bay State Titans
- Walt Harris: Pacific (1989–1991), Pittsburgh (1997–2004), Stanford (2005–2006)
- Jimmy Johnson: Oklahoma State (1979–1983), Miami (FL) (1984–1988), Dallas Cowboys (1989–1993), Miami Dolphins (1996–1999)
- Ken Karcher: Liberty (2000–2005)
- Larry Lacewell: Arkansas State (1979–1989)
- Larry Marmie: Arizona State (1988–1991)
- Gary Nord: UTEP (2000–2003)
- Bill Pace: Vanderbilt (1967–1972)
- Randy Sanders: East Tennessee State (2018–2021)
- Al Saunders: San Diego Chargers (1986–1988)
- Jackie Sherrill: Washington State (1976), Pittsburgh (1977–1981), Texas A&M (1982–1988), Mississippi State (1991–2003)
- Kevin Steele: Baylor (1999–2002)
- Dave Wannstedt: Chicago Bears (1993–1998), Miami Dolphins (2000–2004), Pittsburgh (2005–2010)
- Tommy West: Chattanooga (1993), Clemson (1993–1998), Memphis (2001–2009)
- Ron Zook: Florida (2002–2004), Illinois (2005–2011)
- Charles Coe (American football): Alabama State (2003–2006)

== See also ==
- List of college football head coaches with non-consecutive tenure
