= Robert Black (American football) =

American football player and coach

Current position
- Title: Associate vice president for athletics
- Team: Sewanee
- Conference: SAA

Playing career
- 1985–1989: Sewanee

Coaching career (HC unless noted)
- 1990–1996: Sewanee (DC)
- 1996–2001: Episcopal School of Texas
- 2002–2007: Montgomery Bell Academy (TN) (assistant)
- 2007–2010: Sewanee

Administrative career (AD unless noted)
- 2022–present: Sewanee (associate VP)

Head coaching record
- Overall: 4–34 (college); 28–33 (high school)

Robert Black is an American former football player and coach and current associate vice president for athletics for the Sewanee Tigers. He served as head football coach of Sewanee: The University of the South in Sewanee, Tennessee from 2007 and 2010, compiling a record of 4–34. He previously served as the defensive coordinator at Sewanee in addition to coaching at TMI — The Episcopal School of Texas and the Montgomery Bell Academy. Black was as Sewanee's 29th head football coach.

== Head coaching record ==
=== College ===
Year	Team	Overall	Conference	Standing
Sewanee Tigers (Southern Collegiate Athletic Conference) (2007–2010)
2007	Sewanee	1–8	0–7	8th
2008	Sewanee	2–8	1–6	7th
2009	Sewanee	0–9	0–6	7th
2010	Sewanee	1–9	0–6	7th
Sewanee:		4–34	1–25	
Total:		4–34		
