= Billy Majors =

American football player (1938–1965)

No. 25
- Position: Defensive back

Personal information
- Born: November 7, 1938; Lynchburg, Tennessee, U.S.
- Died: October 18, 1965 (aged 26); Knoxville, Tennessee, U.S.
- Listed height: 6 ft 0 in (1.83 m)
- Listed weight: 175 lb (79 kg)

Career information
- High school: Huntland (TN)
- College: Tennessee
- NFL draft: 1961: 12th round, 168th overall pick
- AFL draft: 1961: 9th round, 68th overall pick

Career history
- Buffalo Bills (1961)

Career AFL statistics
- Games played: 1
- Stats at Pro Football Reference

William Bobo Majors (November 7, 1938 – October 18, 1965) was an American professional football defensive back who played for the Buffalo Bills in 1961 in the American Football League (AFL). He was a ninth round pick of the Buffalo Bills with the 68th overall pick in the 1961 AFL Draft. He played college football at the University of Tennessee.

Majors and two others died in 1965 when their car was struck by a train. He was helping coach at Tennessee at the time.

Majors was posthumously inducted into the Tennessee Sports Hall of Fame in 1966.

His brothers Johnny, Joe, and Bobby also played football.
