= Joe Goodson =

American football player and physician (1876–1924)

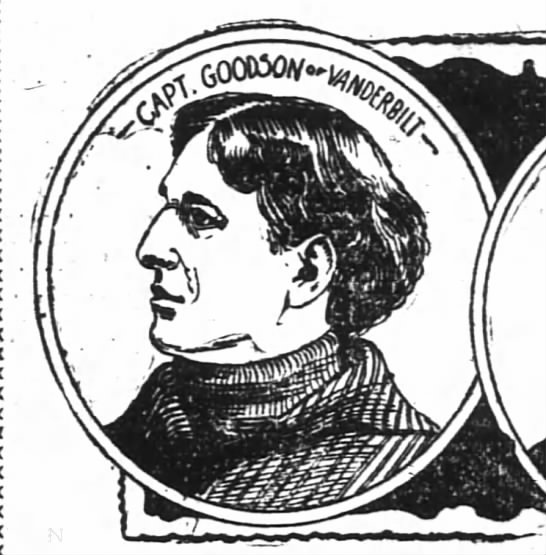
- Born: December 1, 1876; Louisville, Kentucky, U.S.
- Died: August 29, 1924 (aged 47); Lexington, Kentucky, U.S.
- Occupation: Physician
- Football career

Profile
- Position: Quarterback

Career information
- College: Vanderbilt (1897–1898)

Awards and highlights
- SIAA championship (1897)

Joseph A. Goodson (December 1, 1876 – August 29, 1924) was a college football player and physician. He was a quarterback for the Vanderbilt Commodores football team; captain of the 1898 team. Goodson led the team to its first conference title in 1897. The team then played a contest with Virginia for the championship of the south, a tie. The Nashville American reported that, "The Vanderbilt players were in a jolly humor yesterday with their miniature football pinned upon the labels of their coats. Joe Goodson, quarterback, was apparently out of training from a large ten-cent cigar he smoked, a gift of Benjamin Childers of Pulaski. 'Tab' Farrell had his hair cut and other members were more or less changed in appearance."
