= Horace Moore (American football) =

American football player and coach (1926–2005)

Biographical details
- Born: September 16, 1926; Grundy County, Tennessee, U.S.
- Died: July 30, 2005 (aged 78); Sewanee, Tennessee, U.S.

Playing career

Football
- 1944: Tennessee
- 1948–1949: Tennessee Tech

Coaching career (HC unless noted)

Football
- 1950–1954: Grundy HS (TN)
- 1955–1977: Sewanee (assistant)
- 1978–1986: Sewanee
- ?: Chattanooga (assistant)

Golf
- ?: Sewanee

Tennis
- ?: Sewanee

Wrestling
- 1956–1978: Sewanee

Head coaching record
- Overall: 38–42 (college football); 101–78–2 (college wrestling)

Accomplishments and honors

Championships
- Football; 3 CAC (1978–1979, 1982)

James Horace Moore Jr. (September 16, 1926 – July 30, 2005) was an American football coach. He served as the head football coach at Grundy High School in Grundy County, Tennessee from 1950 to 1954 and at Sewanee: The University of the South from 1978 to 1986 after serving as an assistant there under Shirley Majors from 1955 to 1977. At Sewanee, he compiled a record of 38 wins and 42 losses (38–42).

== Playing career ==
Born in Grundy County, Tennessee, Moore played football for the Tennessee Volunteers football team in 1944. His career at Tennessee ended two weeks prior to the 1945 Rose Bowl when he was drafted by the United States Army to serve in World War II. Upon his return, Moore finished out his playing career at Tennessee Technological University where he lettered on the football team in 1948 and 1949 before graduating in 1950.

== Coaching career ==
After graduating from Tennessee Tech, Moore returned home to Grundy County where he became head coach of Grundy High School in Tracy City in 1950. After five years as head coach at Grundy, he was hired by Sewanee in 1955 to serve as line coach. At Sewanee Moore served as line coach through the 1977 season. After Shirley Majors retired as head coach, in January 1978 Moore was named head coach of the Tigers. Serving as head coach at Sewanee from 1978 through 1986, Moore captured one outright and a pair of co-championships in the College Athletic Conference en route to compiling an all-time record of 38 wins and 42 losses (38–42). After retiring from Sewanee, he served as a volunteer kicking coach at the University of Tennessee at Chattanooga for several years.

At Sewanee, Moore also served as golf, tennis, and wrestling head coach. His tenure as wrestling head coach was notable for his 101–78–2 record between 1956 and 1978. During his wrestling tenure Moore coached the squad to seven conference team titles and one All-American.

To recognize his accomplishments as a coach, Moore has been inducted to the Sewanee Athletics Hall of Fame (2004), and the Tennessee Sports Hall of Fame (1993).

== Head coaching record ==
=== College football ===
Year	Team	Overall	Conference	Standing	Bowl/playoffs
Sewanee Tigers (College Athletic Conference) (1978–1986)
1978	Sewanee	4–4	3–1	T–1st	
1979	Sewanee	7–2	3–1	T–1st	
1980	Sewanee	4–5	3–2	3rd	
1981	Sewanee	5–4	3–2	3rd	
1982	Sewanee	7–2	4–1	1st	
1983	Sewanee	5–4	3–2	T–3rd	
1984	Sewanee	0–9	0–4	5th	
1985	Sewanee	4–5	2–2	T–3rd	
1986	Sewanee	2–7	1–3	4th	
Sewanee:		38–42	22–18		
Total:		38–42			
National championship Conference title Conference division title or championship game berth
