= 1898 Kentucky State College Blue and White football team =

American college football season

1898 Kentucky State College Blue and White football

State champion
- Conference: Southern Intercollegiate Athletic Association
- Record: 7–0 (0–0 SIAA)
- Head coach: W. R. Bass (1st season)
- Captain: Roscoe Severs

1898 Southern Intercollegiate Athletic Association football standings
	Conf.					Overall
Team	W		L		T	W		L		T
Sewanee	3	–	0	–	0	4	–	0	–	0
Auburn	2	–	0	–	0	2	–	1	–	0
LSU	1	–	0	–	0	1	–	0	–	0
Georgia	3	–	1	–	0	4	–	2	–	0
Clemson	1	–	1	–	0	3	–	1	–	0
Tulane	1	–	1	–	0	1	–	1	–	0
Vanderbilt	1	–	2	–	0	1	–	5	–	0
Mississippi	0	–	1	–	0	1	–	1	–	0
Texas	0	–	1	–	0	5	–	1	–	0
Nashville	0	–	2	–	0	0	–	2	–	0
Georgia Tech	0	–	3	–	0	0	–	4	–	0
Kentucky State#	0	–	0	–	0	7	–	0	–	0
Cumberland (TN)	0	–	0	–	0	0	–	0	–	0
SW Presbyterian	0	–	0	–	0	0	–	0	–	0
$ – Conference champion; # – State champion

The 1898 Kentucky State College Blue and White football team represented Kentucky State College—now known as the University of Kentucky—during the 1898 Southern Intercollegiate Athletic Association football season. Led by first-year head coach W. R. Bass, the team, known as "the Immortals," was undefeated, untied, and unscored upon, posted a 7–0 record and outscored its opponents 181 to 0. The Centre game was stopped by rain after fifteen minutes of play.

== Schedule ==
Date	Opponent	Site	Result	Source
October 1	Kentucky University*	Lexington, KY (rivalry)	W 18–0	
October 8	at Georgetown (KY)*	Georgetown, KY	W 28–0	
October 15	Co. H. of 8th Massachusetts*	Lexington, KY	W 59–0	
October 29	at Louisville Athletic Club*	League Park; Louisville, KY	W 17–0	
November 5	Centre*	Lexington, KY (rivalry)	W 6–0	
November 8	160th Indiana*	Lexington, KY	W 17–0	
November 19	New Castle Athletic Club*	Lexington, KY	W 36–0	
*Non-conference game

== See also ==
- List of undefeated NCAA Division I football teams
