= 1899 Kentucky State College Blue and White football team =

American college football season

1899 Kentucky State College Blue and White football
- Conference: Southern Intercollegiate Athletic Association
- Record: 5–2–2 (0–1 SIAA)
- Head coach: W. R. Bass (2nd season)
- Captain: A. S. Reese

1899 Southern Intercollegiate Athletic Association football standings
| | Conf. | | | | | Overall |
| Team | W | | L | | T | W | | L | | T |
|---|---|---|---|---|---|---|---|---|---|---|
| Sewanee $ | 11 | – | 0 | – | 0 | 12 | – | 0 | – | 0 |
| Vanderbilt | 5 | – | 0 | – | 0 | 7 | – | 2 | – | 0 |
| Alabama | 1 | – | 0 | – | 0 | 3 | – | 1 | – | 0 |
| Nashville | 4 | – | 1 | – | 0 | 4 | – | 1 | – | 1 |
| Tennessee | 2 | – | 1 | – | 0 | 6 | – | 2 | – | 0 |
| Auburn | 2 | – | 1 | – | 1 | 3 | – | 1 | – | 1 |
| Texas | 3 | – | 2 | – | 0 | 6 | – | 2 | – | 0 |
| North Carolina | 1 | – | 1 | – | 0 | 7 | – | 3 | – | 0 |
| Ole Miss | 3 | – | 4 | – | 0 | 3 | – | 4 | – | 0 |
| Georgia | 2 | – | 3 | – | 1 | 2 | – | 3 | – | 1 |
| Clemson | 1 | – | 2 | – | 0 | 4 | – | 2 | – | 0 |
| Central (KY) | 1 | – | 2 | – | 0 | 1 | – | 2 | – | 0 |
| LSU | 1 | – | 3 | – | 0 | 1 | – | 4 | – | 0 |
| Kentucky State | 0 | – | 1 | – | 0 | 5 | – | 2 | – | 2 |
| SW Presbyterian | 0 | – | 1 | – | 0 | 1 | – | 1 | – | 0 |
| Cumberland (TN) | 0 | – | 3 | – | 0 | 0 | – | 3 | – | 0 |
| Georgia Tech | 0 | – | 5 | – | 0 | 0 | – | 6 | – | 0 |
| Tulane | 0 | – | 5 | – | 0 | 0 | – | 6 | – | 1 |
$ – Conference champion

The 1899 Kentucky State College Blue and White football team represented Kentucky State College—now known as the University of Kentucky—as a member of the Southern Intercollegiate Athletic Association (SIAA) during the 1899 college football season. Led by W. R. Bass in his second and final season as head coach, the Blue and White compiled an overall record of 5–2–2 with a mark of 0–1 in SIAA play.

== Schedule ==
| Date | Opponent | Site | Result | Source |
|---|---|---|---|---|
| October 7 | Kentucky University* | Lexington, KY (rivalry) | W 23–6 | |
| October 18 | Miami (OH)* | Lexington, KY | W 18–5 | |
| October 21 | at Centre* | Danville, KY (rivalry) | T 11–11 | |
| November 4 | at Tennessee | Baldwin Park; Knoxville, TN | L 0–12 | |
| November 11 | Central (KY) | Lexington, KY | L 0–5 | |
| November 18 | Georgetown (KY)* | Lexington, KY | W 34–0 | |
| November 21 | Washington and Lee* | Lexington, KY | T 0–0 | |
| November 22 | Washington and Lee* | Lexington, KY | W 6–0 | |
| November 30 | Kentucky State alumni* | Lexington, KY | W 6–5 | |
*Non-conference game
