= Kit Jones =

American football fullback and halfback

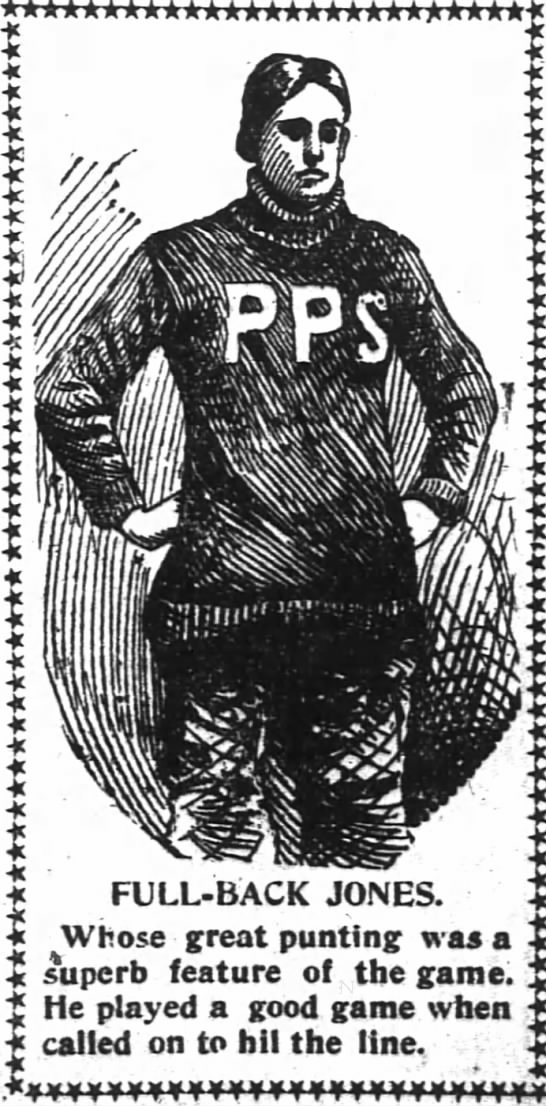
- Jones depicted in 1898

Profile
- Positions: Fullback, halfback

Career information
- College: Georgia (1897–1898)

Awards and highlights
- All-Southern (1898)

Arthur Clarence "Kit" Jones was an American college football player.

== University of Georgia ==
Jones prepped at Princeton Prep School in New Jersey. He was a prominent running back for the Georgia Bulldogs football team of the University of Georgia. In 1897, he was on the team during the season in which Richard Von Albade Gammon died. He was a renowned punter; a skill which had him moved to fullback by 1898. In this capacity Jones was selected All-Southern by W. A. Lambeth. Georgia beat Vanderbilt for the first time in '98. Jones was captain-elect for the '99 season.
