= 1898 Texas Longhorns football team =

American college football season

1898 Texas Longhorns football
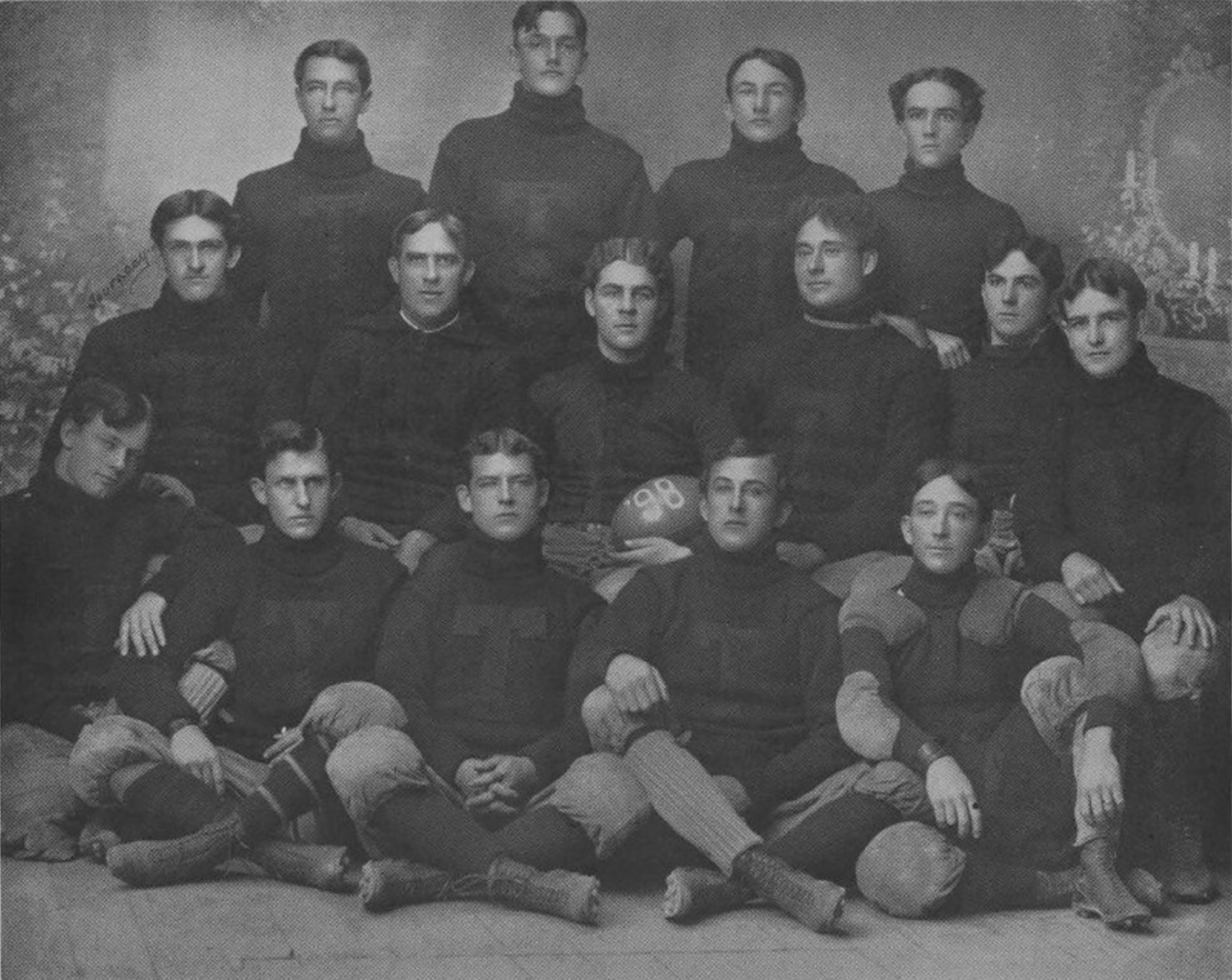
- Conference: Southern Intercollegiate Athletic Association
- Record: 5–1 (0–1 SIAA)
- Head coach: David Farragut Edwards (1st season)
- Captain: R. W. Wortham
- Home stadium: Varsity Athletic Field

1898 Southern Intercollegiate Athletic Association football standings
	Conf.					Overall
Team	W		L		T	W		L		T
Sewanee	3	–	0	–	0	4	–	0	–	0
Auburn	2	–	0	–	0	2	–	1	–	0
LSU	1	–	0	–	0	1	–	0	–	0
Georgia	3	–	1	–	0	4	–	2	–	0
Clemson	1	–	1	–	0	3	–	1	–	0
Tulane	1	–	1	–	0	1	–	1	–	0
Vanderbilt	1	–	2	–	0	1	–	5	–	0
Mississippi	0	–	1	–	0	1	–	1	–	0
Texas	0	–	1	–	0	5	–	1	–	0
Nashville	0	–	2	–	0	0	–	2	–	0
Georgia Tech	0	–	3	–	0	0	–	4	–	0
Kentucky State#	0	–	0	–	0	7	–	0	–	0
Cumberland (TN)	0	–	0	–	0	0	–	0	–	0
SW Presbyterian	0	–	0	–	0	0	–	0	–	0
$ – Conference champion; # – State champion

The 1898 Texas 'Varsity football team represented The University of Texas (now known as the University of Texas at Austin Longhorns) as a member of the Southern Intercollegiate Athletic Association (SIAA) during the 1898 college football season. Led by first-year head coach David Farragut Edwards, the Longhorns compiled an overall record of 5–1.

== Schedule ==
Date	Time	Opponent	Site	Result	Attendance	Source
October 15	3:40 p.m.	at Add-Ran Christian*	Padgitt's Park; Waco, TX (rivalry)	W 16–0	600–700	
October 22		Texas A&M*	Varsity Athletic Field; Austin, TX (rivalry)	W 48–0		
October 29		Galveston High School*	Varsity Athletic Field; Austin, TX	W 17–0		
November 5	3:30 p.m.	Add-Ran Christian*	Varsity Athletic Field; Austin, TX	W 29–0		
November 10		Sewanee	Varsity Athletic Field; Austin, TX	L 0–4		
November 24		at Dallas*	Varsity Athletic Field; Austin, TX	W 26–0		
*Non-conference game

== Personnel ==
=== Line ===
Player	Position	Games played	Home town	Height	Weight	Age	Letter #
Walter Schreiner	Left End	6	Kerrville, Texas	5'10"	144 lbs	21	3rd
Lamar Bethea	Left Tackle	5	Seven Oaks, Texas	6'0"	173 lbs	22	3rd
R.W. Wortham	Left Guard	6	Paris, Texas	5'11"	181 lbs	22	4th
Edward Overshiner	Center	6	Valley View, Texas	5'10"	171 lbs	24	1st
Mark McMahon	Right Guard	6	Savoy, Texas	5'11"	166 lbs	20	1st
James H. Hart	Right Tackle	6	Austin, Texas	6'2"	164 lbs	20	2nd
R.W. Franklin	Right End	4	Houston, Texas	5'8"	149 lbs	22	1st
Semp Russ	End	3	San Antonio, Texas	5'7"	140 lbs	21	1st

=== Backfield ===
Player	Position	Games played	Home town	Height	Weight	Age	Letter #
Sam Hogsett	Quarterback	6	Fort Worth, Texas	5'8"	146 lbs	21	2nd
Cade Bethea	Left Halfback	6	Seven Oaks, Texas	5'8"	164 lbs	20	2nd
C.H. Leavell	Right Halfback	6	Georgetown, Texas	5'9"	145 lbs	22	3rd
Carl F. Groos	Fullback	6	San Antonio, Texas	5'6"	166 lbs	19	2nd

=== Subs ===
Player	Position	Games played	Home town	Height	Weight	Age	Letter #
James F. Wheeler	Halfback	3	Austin, Texas	5'5"	149 lbs	26	1st
Donald Cameron	Guard	3	Coleman, Texas	5'10"	176 lbs	20	1st
Morton
Prather
