= Jack Dye =

American football player and surgeon (1876–1944)

Profile
- Position: Halfback

Personal information
- Born: August 24, 1876; LaCrosse, Arkansas, U.S.
- Died: August 9, 1944 (aged 67); Waterbury, Connecticut, U.S.

Career information
- College: Vanderbilt (1895–1898)

Awards and highlights
- SIAA championship (1897); All-Southern (1898)

John Sinclair Dye (August 24, 1876 – August 9, 1944) was an American college football player and surgeon who served in the First World War.

== Vanderbilt University ==
He was a prominent halfback for the Vanderbilt Commodores football team of Vanderbilt University from 1895 to 1898.

=== 1897 ===
The team held all opponents scoreless and won its first conference title in 1897.

=== 1898 ===
Dye was selected All-Southern in 1898.

== Chattanooga ==
At the turn of the century, Dye ran a gymnasium in Chattanooga as head of the local Athletic Association. Dye attempted to come back and play for Vanderbilt, but was refused on eligibility grounds by William Lofland Dudley. Dye was also a successful surgeon of Chattanooga who worked at the Erlanger Hospital in 1914.

== Connecticut ==
Dye later moved to Waterbury, Connecticut.
