= 1898 Vanderbilt Commodores football team =

American college football season

1898 Vanderbilt Commodores football
- Conference: Southern Intercollegiate Athletic Association
- Record: 1–5 (1–2 SIAA)
- Head coach: R. G. Acton (3rd season)
- Captain: Joe Goodson
- Home stadium: Dudley Field

1898 Southern Intercollegiate Athletic Association football standings
	Conf.					Overall
Team	W		L		T	W		L		T
Sewanee	3	–	0	–	0	4	–	0	–	0
Auburn	2	–	0	–	0	2	–	1	–	0
LSU	1	–	0	–	0	1	–	0	–	0
Georgia	3	–	1	–	0	4	–	2	–	0
Clemson	1	–	1	–	0	3	–	1	–	0
Tulane	1	–	1	–	0	1	–	1	–	0
Vanderbilt	1	–	2	–	0	1	–	5	–	0
Mississippi	0	–	1	–	0	1	–	1	–	0
Texas	0	–	1	–	0	5	–	1	–	0
Nashville	0	–	2	–	0	0	–	2	–	0
Georgia Tech	0	–	3	–	0	0	–	4	–	0
Kentucky State#	0	–	0	–	0	7	–	0	–	0
Cumberland (TN)	0	–	0	–	0	0	–	0	–	0
SW Presbyterian	0	–	0	–	0	0	–	0	–	0
$ – Conference champion; # – State champion

The 1898 Vanderbilt Commodores football team represented Vanderbilt University during the 1898 Southern Intercollegiate Athletic Association football season. Vanderbilt was in its ninth season of playing football, coached by R. G. Acton in his third and last year at Vanderbilt. Vanderbilt's 1898 record was 1–5. This was Vanderbilt's first losing season.

== Schedule ==
Date	Opponent	Site	Result	Attendance	Source
October 15	Cincinnati*	Dudley Field; Nashville, TN	L 0–12		
October 29	vs. Georgia	Piedmont Park; Atlanta, GA (rivalry)	L 0–4	2,000	
November 5	Nashville	Dudley Field; Nashville, TN	W 5–0		
November 12	vs. Virginia*	Fontaine Ferry Park; Louisville, KY	L 0–18		
November 19	Central (KY)*	Dudley Field; Nashville, TN	L 0–10		
November 24	Sewanee	Dudley Field; Nashville, TN (rivalry)	L 4–19	4,000	
*Non-conference game

== Game summaries ==
=== Cincinnati ===
The season opened with a 12–0 loss to Cincinnati.

=== Georgia – Human Blood Stains Gridiron ===
Georgia beat Vanderbilt 4–0. Quarterback Kid Huff saved a touchdown in the Vanderbilt game when he tackled the large Wallace Crutchfield.

The October 30, 1898, edition of the Nashville American gave a report on the debate to abolish the game. The headline for the story stated, "How Many Lives Are To Be Sacrificed During This Season?" More notices to the story read, "HUMAN BLOOD STAINS GRIDIRON" and "Horrors of the Foot Ball Field Have Given Rise to an Agitation in Favor of Abolishing the Game" and "BEEN FORBIDDON IN SOME COLLEGES." This is a portion of the story: "Is football becoming so brutally dangerous as to call for legislate restriction or abolishment? Just as the desire for the superseding, of war by arbitration to straightening out international complications had its birth in the grief and tears of the widow and the fatherless, so does the above question owe its origin to those who have been seen promising young men cut off in the prime or their youth, or maimed for life by the disparate struggle for football honors. Year after year the list of victims grow, until the matter has at last attracted national attention and in the absence of laws, declaring that young men may not risk life and limb in the gridiron contests some college authorities are forbidding the students to play football, and thus it comes about that institutions that have been prominent in this branch of sport will not be heard of during the present season.

"A study of the casualties of the football fields proves that those who oppose the game on account of its brutality and danger are justified in their views. Here are a few of the causes of death on the football field or injuries received that resulted in death later:

"Two opposing players running. A careless tackle by one caused the heads of the two to come violently together. Result one man serious hurt that concussion of the brain, ensued ending in death.

"A scrimmage man holding ball went down with as many men atop of him as could get near enough to add their weight to the heap. Lower man did not rise when the mass disentangled itself. Examination showed that his neck had been broken, killing him instantly.

"Four players fell in a heap. In the struggle one lashed out with his foot, catching another on the head with the heel of his heavy shoe. Kicked man died three days later.

"The list could have been extended halfway down the column, and a perusal of the news pages of the daily journals will show that deaths or injuries, broken bones, dislocated shoulders, smashed noses and sprained ankles are of daily occurrence among football players.

"Were it not for the fact that football men of the colleges are young giants who have hardened their muscles and rendered themselves proof against lighter injuries by reason of the fact that they are trained athletes, and have practiced falling and tackling so as to reduce the possibility of accident to a minimum, the list would be much larger. Nevertheless, pertinently query the opponents of football, what youth, however well trained, can be a football accident immune, which at stages of the game he is pretty sure to be the pivotal point of a squirming human pyramid weighing 2,000 pounds? If the game cannot be played without such dangerous features as this, they say, and then better strike it from the list of sports.

Vanderbilt's starting lineup was Powell (left end), Longhorse (left tackle), Sewell (left guard), Brown (center), Crutchfield (right guard), Martin (right tackle), Simmons (right end), Goodson (quarterback), Davis (left halfback), Edgerton (right halfback), Burke (fullback).

=== Nashville ===
The season's lone win came over the University of Nashville (Peabody), 5–0.

=== Virginia ===
The most anticipated game in the South was the matchup between last season's two southern champions, Virginia and Vanderbilt, in Louisville. Virginia won 18–0. The game was played at Fontaine Ferry Park.

=== Central ===
Vanderbilt was beaten 10–0 by one of the best Central teams.

=== Sewanee ===
Sewanee at Vanderbilt

Team	1	2	Total
• Sewanee	10	9	19
Vanderbilt	4	0	4

- Date: November 24
- Location: Dudley Field
  Nashville, Tennessee
- Game start: 2:30 p. m.
- Game attendance: 4,000
- Referee: W. P. Taylor (Birmingham)

The Sewanee Tigers beat the rival Commodores 19–4. Sewell made the first touchdown on a 7-yard run. Vanderbilt's score came on a 40-yard run around left end by Walter H. Simmons. Ormond Simkins scored next on a 2-yard run. After the half, Kilpatrick scored on a 2-yard run. The last touchdown was a 35-yard run from Smith.

The starting lineup was Powers (left end), Martin (left tackle), Crutchfield (left guard), Brown (center), Sewell (right guard), Langhorst (right tackle), Simmons (right end), O'Connor (quarterback), Dye (left halfback), Edgerton (right halfback), Burke (fullback).

== Postseason ==
This was Vanderbilts first losing season.

During the Theodore Roosevelt administration (1905) a meeting was held at the White House with various college athletic officials in attendance to discuss the violence in football. representatives of the premier collegiate powers—Harvard, Yale and Princeton—to the White House on October 9, 1905. Roosevelt urged them to curb excessive violence and set an example of fair play for the rest of the country. The schools released a statement condemning brutality and pledging to keep the game clean. President Roosevelt was also concerned about the deaths and serious injuries football was recording. Over the decades injuries have been reduced with rule changes, better equipment and advancement in training habits. But it is a contact sport with serious injuries and occasional deaths still occurring.
