= Wallace Crutchfield =

American football player and reverend

Profile
- Position: Guard

Personal information
- Born: August 26, 1879; Gainesville, Texas, U.S.
- Died: March 16, 1952; Wister, Oklahoma, U.S.
- Listed weight: 230 lb (104 kg)

Career information
- College: Vanderbilt (1896–1899, 1901)

Awards and highlights
- SIAA championship (1897); All-Southern (1899)

Wallace Moss Crutchfield (August 26, 1879 – March 16, 1952) was an American college football player and a pastor in Texas and Oklahoma. He was pastor of the Methodist Church in Tishomingo from 1945 to 1949.

== Vanderbilt University ==
Crutchfield was a prominent guard for the Vanderbilt Commodores football team of Vanderbilt University from 1896 to 1901, at that time "the biggest man that ever played on the Vanderbilt football team," weighing 230 pounds. He was selected All-Southern by W. A. Lambeth in 1899.
