= Edmond Chavanne =

American football player and coach (1878–1941)

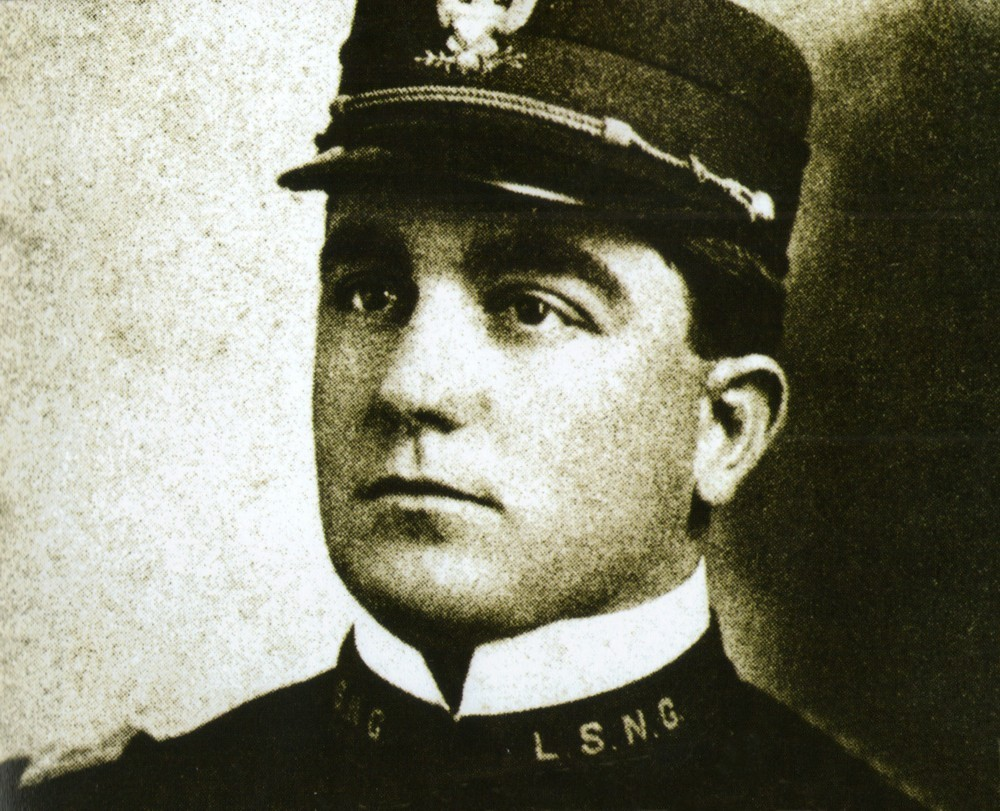
- Chavanne in LSU cadet uniform, 1898

Biographical details
- Born: August 6, 1878; Lake Charles, Louisiana, U.S.
- Died: May 1941 (aged 62); New Orleans, Louisiana, U.S.

Playing career
- 1896–1898: LSU
- Position: Center

Coaching career (HC unless noted)
- 1898, 1900: LSU

Head coaching record
- Overall: 3–2

Edmond Auguste M. Chavanne (August 6, 1878 – May 1941) was an American college football player and coach. He served as the head football coach at Louisiana State University (LSU) for two seasons, 1898 and 1900, compiling a career record of 3–2. John P. Gregg coached the team in 1899. Chavanne was the first LSU football coach to have graduated from LSU. He is the only player-coach in LSU football history. The 1898 season was delayed due to a yellow fever outbreak throughout the South. Prior to the season starting, LSU's previous football coach, Allen Jeardeau, had departed the school and the coaching position. Since the school had not made any provision to name a replacement coach, the job was left to Chavanne, the team's captain. Chavanne graduated from LSU in 1898. He had previously played on the school's football team from 1896 to 1898. He was named as Commandant of Cadets at LSU in 1899, and football coach in 1900.

== Head coaching record ==
Year	Team	Overall	Conference	Standing	Bowl/playoffs
LSU Tigers (Southern Intercollegiate Athletic Association) (1898)
1898	LSU	1–0	1–0		
LSU Tigers (Southern Intercollegiate Athletic Association) (1900)
1900	LSU	2–2	0–1		
LSU:		3–2	1–1		
Total:		3–2			
