= 1898 Ole Miss Rebels football team =

American college football season

1898 Ole Miss Rebels football
- Conference: Southern Intercollegiate Athletic Association
- Record: 1–1 (0–1 SIAA)
- Head coach: T. G. Scarbrough (1st season)

1898 Southern Intercollegiate Athletic Association football standings
	Conf.					Overall
Team	W		L		T	W		L		T
Sewanee	3	–	0	–	0	4	–	0	–	0
Auburn	2	–	0	–	0	2	–	1	–	0
LSU	1	–	0	–	0	1	–	0	–	0
Georgia	3	–	1	–	0	4	–	2	–	0
Clemson	1	–	1	–	0	3	–	1	–	0
Tulane	1	–	1	–	0	1	–	1	–	0
Vanderbilt	1	–	2	–	0	1	–	5	–	0
Mississippi	0	–	1	–	0	1	–	1	–	0
Texas	0	–	1	–	0	5	–	1	–	0
Nashville	0	–	2	–	0	0	–	2	–	0
Georgia Tech	0	–	3	–	0	0	–	4	–	0
Kentucky State#	0	–	0	–	0	7	–	0	–	0
Cumberland (TN)	0	–	0	–	0	0	–	0	–	0
SW Presbyterian	0	–	0	–	0	0	–	0	–	0
$ – Conference champion; # – State champion

The 1898 Ole Miss Rebels football team represented the University of Mississippi during the 1898 Southern Intercollegiate Athletic Association football season. The season was the team's first in the Southern Intercollegiate Athletic Association (SIAA). Led by T. G. Scarbrough in his first and only season as head coach, Ole Miss compiled an overall record of 1–1.

== Schedule ==
Date	Opponent	Site	Result	Source
December 12	at Tulane	Tulane Athletic Field; New Orleans, LA (rivalry)	L 9–14	
December 17	St. Thomas Hall	Oxford, MS	W 9–2	
