= W. R. Bass =

American football player and coach (1874–1951)

Biographical details
- Born: August 12, 1874
- Died: October 25, 1951 (aged 77); Terrace Park, Ohio, U.S.

Playing career
- 1895: Ohio Wesleyan
- 1896–1897: Cincinnati

Coaching career (HC unless noted)
- 1898–1899: Kentucky State College

Head coaching record
- Overall: 12–2–2

William Rybolt Bass (August 12, 1874 – October 25, 1951) was an American college football player and coach. He served as the head football coach at Kentucky State College—now known as the University of Kentucky—from 1898 to 1899, compiling a record of 12–2–2. As a college football player, he earned letters at Ohio Wesleyan University in 1895 and at the University of Cincinnati in 1896 and 1897.

== Head coaching record ==
| Year | Team | Overall | Conference | Standing | Bowl/playoffs |
|---|---|---|---|---|---|
Kentucky State College Blue and White (Southern Intercollegiate Athletic Association) (1898–1899)
| 1898 | Kentucky State College | 7–0 | 0–0 | | |
| 1899 | Kentucky State College | 5–2–2 | 0–1 | | |
| Kentucky State College: | | 12–2–2 | 0–1 | | |
| Total: | | 12–2–2 | | | |
