= Bill Samko =

American football coach (born 1951)

Biographical details
- Born: July 9, 1951 (age 75); Worcester, Massachusetts, U.S.

Playing career

Baseball
- 1971: Connecticut

Coaching career (HC unless noted)

Football
- 1974–1980: Tufts (assistant)
- 1981–1986: Yale (assistant)
- 1987–1993: Sewanee
- 1994–2010: Tufts
- 2011: Holy Cross (volunteer)
- 2012–2016: Holy Cross (OL)
- 2017–2021: Bentley (AHC/OL)

Baseball
- 1979–1982: Tufts
- 1990: Sewanee

Head coaching record
- Overall: 92–106–1 (football); 67–63 (baseball)

Bill Samko (born July 8, 1952) is an American college football coach. He was most recently the assistant head coach and offensive line coach at the Bentley University. Samko served as head coach of Tufts University between 1994 and 2010, compiling a record of 57–79. He also served as head coach of Sewanee: The University of the South from 1987 to 1993, tallying a mark of 35–27–1. Prior to his tenures as a head coach, Samko served as an assistant coach at Tufts from 1974 to 1980 and at Yale University from 1981 to 1986 under head coach Carmen Cozza.

== Head coaching record ==
=== Football ===
Year	Team	Overall	Conference	Standing
Sewanee Tigers (College Athletic Conference / Southern Collegiate Athletic Conference) (1987–1993)
1987	Sewanee	5–4	1–3	T–3rd
1988	Sewanee	3–6	1–3	4th
1989	Sewanee	2–7	1–3	4th
1990	Sewanee	6–3	3–1	T–1st
1991	Sewanee	7–1–1	2–1–1	T–2nd
1992	Sewanee	8–1	4–0	1st
1993	Sewanee	4–5	1–3	T–4th
Sewanee:		35–27–1	13–14–1	
Tufts Jumbos (New England Small College Athletic Conference) (1994–2010)
1994	Tufts	2–6	2–6	
1995	Tufts	4–4	4–4	
1996	Tufts	1–7	1–7	
1997	Tufts	3–5	3–5	
1998	Tufts	7–1	7–1	2nd
1999	Tufts	4–4	4–4	T–6th
2000	Tufts	2–6	2–6	T–7th
2001	Tufts	6–2	6–2	3rd
2002	Tufts	3–5	3–5	T–7th
2003	Tufts	5–3	5–3	T–3rd
2004	Tufts	2–6	2–6	T–7th
2005	Tufts	2–6	2–6	T–7th
2006	Tufts	4–4	4–4	5th
2007	Tufts	5–3	5–3	4th
2008	Tufts	4–4	4–4	T–5th
2009	Tufts	2–6	2–6	T–8th
2010	Tufts	1–7	1–7	T–9th
Tufts:		57–79	57–79	
Total:		92–106–1		
National championship Conference title Conference division title or championship game berth
