= John Gere Jayne =

American football and baseball coach, attorney (1874–1920)

Biographical details
- Born: May 12, 1874; Berwick, Pennsylvania, U.S.
- Died: September 6, 1920 (aged 46); Berwick, Pennsylvania, U.S.

Playing career

Baseball
- 1893–1897: Princeton
- Positions: Pitcher, outfielder

Coaching career (HC unless noted)

Football
- 1897–1898: Sewanee
- 1899–1900: North Carolina (assistant)

Head coaching record
- Overall: 5–3–1

Accomplishments and honors

Championships
- 1 SIAA (1898)

John Gere Jayne (May 12, 1874 – September 6, 1920) was an attorney and American football and baseball coach for the Sewanee Tigers of Sewanee: The University of the South.

== Early years ==
Jayne was the son of Samuel Carver Jayne and Hattie Gere. Samuel was the cashier at the First National Bank. Hattie's mother was the aunt of Grover Cleveland. He attended Princeton University, where he got his law degree. He was a pitcher and outfielder on the baseball team. He graduated in June 1897.

== Sewanee ==
Jayne's first year coaching Sewanee football was the worst in its history. He then coached the 1898 Sewanee football team to the Southern Intercollegiate Athletic Association (SIAA) championship.

== Head coaching record ==
Year	Team	Overall	Conference	Standing	Bowl/playoffs
Sewanee Tigers (Southern Intercollegiate Athletic Association) (1897–1898)
1897	Sewanee	1–3–1	1–2–1		
1898	Sewanee	4–0	3–0	1st	
Sewanee:		5–3–1	4–2–1		
Total:		5–3–1			
National championship Conference title Conference division title or championship game berth
