= John Windham =

American football player and coach (born 1964)

Biographical details
- Born: June 23, 1964 (age 62)

Playing career
- 1982–1985: Vanderbilt
- Position: Defensive end

Coaching career (HC unless noted)
- 1987: Livingston (assistant)
- 1988–1989: Mississippi State (GA)
- 1990–1995: Colorado College (DC)
- 1996–2006: Sewanee
- 2007–2010: Gardner–Webb (DC)
- 2011–2014: Furman (DC)
- 2015–2018: Easley HS (SC)

Head coaching record
- Overall: 45–61 (college); 20–23 (high school)

John Windham (born June 23, 1964) is an American football coach. He served as the head football coach at Sewanee: The University of the South from 1996 to 2006, compiling a record of 45–61. Windham was the defensive coordinator Colorado College from 1990 to 1995, Gardner–Webb University from 2007 to 2010, and Furman University from 2011 to 2014. He most recently served as the head football coach at Easley High School in Easley, South Carolina, where he tallied a mark of 20–23 in four seasons before resigning in November 2018.

== Playing career ==
Windham was an All-State and All-South player in high school at Brentwood Academy. In his senior year (1981–82), the Eagles won the TSSAA football AA championship. Windham was also the 1982 AA state champion in shot put.

Commonly known as "Squeezebox", Windham lettered at Vanderbilt University, where he played defensive end for the Commodores. In the 1985 season he led the team in both tackles for loss and sacks. Following the 1986 NFL draft, Windham signed as an undrafted free agent with the New England Patriots. He was subsequently released during training camp the following August.

== Head coaching record ==
=== College ===
| Year | Team | Overall | Conference | Standing | Bowl/playoffs |
|---|---|---|---|---|---|
Sewanee Tigers (Southern Collegiate Athletic Conference) (1996–2006)
| 1996 | Sewanee | 4–4 | 2–2 | 3rd | |
| 1997 | Sewanee | 5–4 | 1–3 | 3rd | |
| 1998 | Sewanee | 2–7 | 1–5 | 6th | |
| 1999 | Sewanee | 6–4 | 4–2 | T–2nd | |
| 2000 | Sewanee | 6–4 | 4–2 | T–1st | |
| 2001 | Sewanee | 5–5 | 2–4 | 5th | |
| 2002 | Sewanee | 5–5 | 4–2 | 3rd | |
| 2003 | Sewanee | 3–7 | 0–6 | 7th | |
| 2004 | Sewanee | 2–8 | 1–5 | T–6th | |
| 2005 | Sewanee | 5–5 | 4–2 | 3rd | |
| 2006 | Sewanee | 2–8 | 0–6 | 7th | |
| Sewanee: | | 45–61 | 21–39 | | |
| Total: | | 45–61 | | | |
National championship Conference title Conference division title or championship game berth
