= T. G. Scarbrough =

American football coach

Coaching career (HC unless noted)
- 1898: Ole Miss

Head coaching record
- Overall: 1–1

T. G. Scarbrough was an American football coach. He served as the head football coach at the University of Mississippi (Ole Miss) in 1898. During his one-season tenure at Ole Miss, Scarbrough compiled an overall record of one win and one loss (1–1).

== Head coaching record ==
Year	Team	Overall	Conference	Standing	Bowl/playoffs
Ole Miss Rebels (Independent) (1898)
1898	Ole Miss	1–1			
Ole Miss:		1–1			
Total:		1–1			
