= 1898 LSU Tigers football team =

American college football season

1898 LSU Tigers football
- Conference: Southern Intercollegiate Athletic Association
- Record: 1–0 (1–0 SIAA)
- Head coach: Edmond Chavanne (1st season)
- Captain: Edmond Chavanne
- Home stadium: State Field

1898 Southern Intercollegiate Athletic Association football standings
	Conf.					Overall
Team	W		L		T	W		L		T
Sewanee	3	–	0	–	0	4	–	0	–	0
Auburn	2	–	0	–	0	2	–	1	–	0
LSU	1	–	0	–	0	1	–	0	–	0
Georgia	3	–	1	–	0	4	–	2	–	0
Clemson	1	–	1	–	0	3	–	1	–	0
Tulane	1	–	1	–	0	1	–	1	–	0
Vanderbilt	1	–	2	–	0	1	–	5	–	0
Mississippi	0	–	1	–	0	1	–	1	–	0
Texas	0	–	1	–	0	5	–	1	–	0
Nashville	0	–	2	–	0	0	–	2	–	0
Georgia Tech	0	–	3	–	0	0	–	4	–	0
Kentucky State#	0	–	0	–	0	7	–	0	–	0
Cumberland (TN)	0	–	0	–	0	0	–	0	–	0
SW Presbyterian	0	–	0	–	0	0	–	0	–	0
$ – Conference champion; # – State champion

The 1898 LSU Tigers football team represented the LSU Tigers of Louisiana State University during the 1898 Southern Intercollegiate Athletic Association football season. The Tigers, with new coach Edmond Chavanne, played only one game for the 1898 season. It was their third undefeated season. Another outbreak of yellow fever similar to the one in 1897 caused LSU to play only one game. By the time LSU was able to play its only game of the season, Allen Jeardeau had departed from the school as head football coach, and no provision had been made to replace him. The job of coach then fell to the team's captain, Edmond Chavanne, the only player-coach in LSU football history. 1898 marked the final year of play for William S. Slaughter. He was LSU's first five time football letterman.

== Schedule ==
Date	Opponent	Site	Result	Source
December 18	Tulane	State Field; Baton Rouge, LA (rivalry)	W 37–0	

== Roster ==
No.	Player	Position	Height	Weight	Hometown	High School
-	Hulette F. "Red" Aby	Tackle	-	-	Natchez, MS	-
-	Joel B. Bateman	Guard	-	-	Franklin, LA	-
-	William Benjamin Chamberlin	-	-	-	DeVall, LA	-
-	Edmond Auguste M. Chavanne	Center	-	-	Lake Charles, LA	-
-	Wilmore A. Coco	Guard	-	-	Marksville, LA	-
-	Armand P. Daspit	Halfback	-	-	Houma, LA	-
-	Justin C, Daspit	Halfback	-	-	Houma, LA	-
-	Leopold Kaffie	Center	-	-	Natchitoches, LA	-
-	George B. LeSueur	-	-	-	Houma, LA	-
-	Thomas L. Sherburne	Guard	-	-	Baton Rouge, LA	-
-	William S. Slaughter	End	-	-	Port Hudson, LA	-
-	John T. Stanford	-	-	-	Baton Rouge, LA	-
-	Benjamin B. Wall	Halfback	-	-	Alexandria, LA	-
