= 1898 Sewanee Tigers football team =

American college football season

1898 Sewanee Tigers football
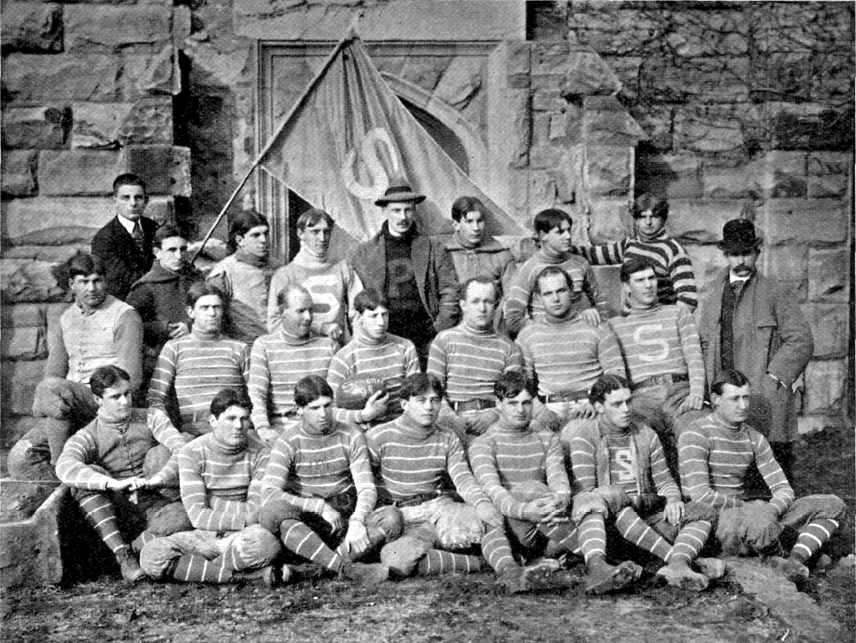

SIAA champion
- Conference: Southern Intercollegiate Athletic Association
- Record: 4–0 (3–0 SIAA)
- Head coach: John Gere Jayne (2nd season)
- Captain: Dana Smith
- Home stadium: Hardee Field

1898 Southern Intercollegiate Athletic Association football standings
	Conf.					Overall
Team	W		L		T	W		L		T
Sewanee	3	–	0	–	0	4	–	0	–	0
Auburn	2	–	0	–	0	2	–	1	–	0
LSU	1	–	0	–	0	1	–	0	–	0
Georgia	3	–	1	–	0	4	–	2	–	0
Clemson	1	–	1	–	0	3	–	1	–	0
Tulane	1	–	1	–	0	1	–	1	–	0
Vanderbilt	1	–	2	–	0	1	–	5	–	0
Mississippi	0	–	1	–	0	1	–	1	–	0
Texas	0	–	1	–	0	5	–	1	–	0
Nashville	0	–	2	–	0	0	–	2	–	0
Georgia Tech	0	–	3	–	0	0	–	4	–	0
Kentucky State#	0	–	0	–	0	7	–	0	–	0
Cumberland (TN)	0	–	0	–	0	0	–	0	–	0
SW Presbyterian	0	–	0	–	0	0	–	0	–	0
$ – Conference champion; # – State champion

The 1898 Sewanee Tigers football team represented Sewanee: The University of the South during the 1898 Southern Intercollegiate Athletic Association football season. The team was coached by John Gere Jayne in his second year as head coach, compiling a record of 4–0 (3–0 SIAA) and outscoring opponents 56 to 4 to win the Southern Intercollegiate Athletic Association title. Due to misgivings over Virginia and North Carolina playing ringers, Caspar Whitney declared Sewanee the best team in the South.

== Before the season ==
Sewanee was coming off the worst season in school history.

== Schedule ==
Date	Opponent	Site	Result	Attendance	Source
October 15	Nashville	Hardee Field; Sewanee, TN	W 10–0		
November 10	at Texas	Varsity Athletic Field; Austin, TX	W 4–0		
November 12	at Southern Athletic Club*	Athletic Park; New Orleans, LA	W 21–0		
November 24	at Vanderbilt	Dudley Field; Nashville, TN (rivalry)	W 19–4	4,000	
*Non-conference game

== Game summaries ==
=== Nashville ===
Nashville at Sewanee

Team	1	2	Total
Nashville	0	0	0
• Sewanee	5	5	10

- Date: October 15
- Location: McGee Field
  Sewanee, Tennessee
- Referee: Throne

The season opened with a 10–0 victory to avenge last year's loss to the Nashville Garnet and Blue.

The starting lineup was Waites (left end), Jones (left tackle), Bolling (left guard), Risley (center), Claiborne (right guard), Smith (right tackle), Crandle (right end), Wilson (quarterback), Kilpatrick (left halfback), Gray (right halfback), Simkins (fullback).

=== Texas ===
Sewanee at Texas

Team	1	2	Total
• Sewanee	4	0	4
Texas	0	0	0

- Date: November 10
- Location: Austin, Texas

Sewanee beat Texas 4–0, scoring on a trick play.

The starting lineup was Waites (left end), Jones (left tackle), Risby (left guard), Poole (center), Claiborne (right guard), Smith (right tackle), Crandle (right end), Wilson (quarterback), Kilpatrick (left halfback), Gray (right halfback), Simkins (fullback).

=== Southern A. C. ===
Sewanee at Southern A. C.

Team	1	2	Total
• Sewanee	11	10	21
Southern	0	0	0

- Date: November 12
- Location: Athletic Park
  New Orleans
- Game start: 3:00 p. m.
- Referee: Leigh Carroll

Sewanee defeated the Southern Athletic Club of New Orleans 21–0. A 12-yard run by Jones made the first touchdown. Davis made the next touchdown. He also scored the third, in the second half. Ormond Simkins made the last touchdown, racing for the goal after William H. Poole blocked a kick.

The starting lineup was Waites (left end), Jones (left tackle), Risby (left guard), Poole (center), Claiborne (right guard), Smith (right tackle), Crandell (right end), Wilson (quarterback), Kilpatrick (left halfback), Davis (right halfback), Simkins (fullback).

=== Vanderbilt ===
Sewanee at Vanderbilt

Team	1	2	Total
• Sewanee	10	9	19
Vanderbilt	4	0	4

- Date: November 24
- Location: Dudley Field
  Nashville, Tennessee
- Game start: 2:30 p. m.
- Game attendance: 4,000
- Referee: W. P. Taylor (Birmingham)

The Tigers beat rival Vanderbilt 19–4. Sewell made the first touchdown on a 7-yard run. Vanderbilt's score came on a 40-yard run around left end by Walter H. Simmons. Simkins scored next on a 2-yard run. After the half, Kilpatrick scored on a 2-yard run. The last touchdown was a 35-yard run from Smith.

The starting lineup was Waites (left end), Jones (left tackle), Risley (left guard), Poole (center), Claiborne (right guard), Smith (right tackle), Davis (right end), Wilson (quarterback), Kilpatrick (left halfback), Siebels (right halfback), Simkins (fullback).

== Postseason ==
Sewanee won the SIAA title.

== Players ==
=== Varsity lettermen ===
==== Line ====
Player	Position	Games started	Hometown	Prep school	Height	Weight	Age
"Wild Bill" Claiborne	guard		Amherst Co., Virginia	Roanoke College	6'0"	190	
A. H. Davis	end						
J. W. "Deacon" Jones	tackle		Marshall, Texas				
William H. Poole	center		Glyndon, Maryland		6'0"	185	18
H. S. Risley	guard						
Dana Smith	tackle						
John C. Waties	end						

==== Backfield ====
Player	Position	Games started	Hometown	Prep school	Height	Weight	Age
Charles Quintard Gray	halfback		Ocala, Florida				
Rex Kilpatrick	halfback		Bridgeport, Alabama		6'1"	185	17
Henry Seibels	halfback		Montgomery, Alabama		5'10"	170	22
Ormond Simkins	fullback		Corsicana, Texas		5'10"	163	19
Warbler Wilson	quarterback		Rock Hill, South Carolina		5'10"	154	21

==== Subs ====
Player	Position	Games started	Hometown	Prep school	Height	Weight	Age
R. G. Arrington
Ralph P. Black
R. E. Bolling
G. G. Cannon
Howard Crandell
Ralph Nesbit
H. M. T. "Bunny" Pearce	end						
Charles B. Colmore	back						
