= Shirley Majors =

American football and baseball coach

Biographical details
- Born: May 7, 1913; Moore County, Tennessee, U.S.
- Died: April 5, 1981 (aged 67); Westmoreland, Tennessee, U.S.

Coaching career (HC unless noted)

Football
- 1943–1949: Moore County HS (TN)
- 1950–1956: Huntland HS (TN)
- 1957–1977: Sewanee

Baseball
- 1960–1970: Sewanee

Head coaching record
- Overall: 93–74–5 (college football); 105–110 (college baseball); 108–24–2 (high school football)

Accomplishments and honors

Championships
- Football; 6 CAC (1963–1965, 1967, 1975–1976)

Shirley Inman Majors (May 7, 1913 – April 5, 1981) was an American football and baseball coach. He attended Lynchburg and Englewood high schools in Tennessee, graduating from the latter in 1944. He served as the head football coach at Huntland High School in Franklin County, Tennessee from 1949 to 1956 and at Sewanee: The University of the South from 1957 to 1977. At Sewanee, he compiled a record of 93–74–5. His total of 93 wins is the most of any head coach in the history of the Sewanee Tigers football program.

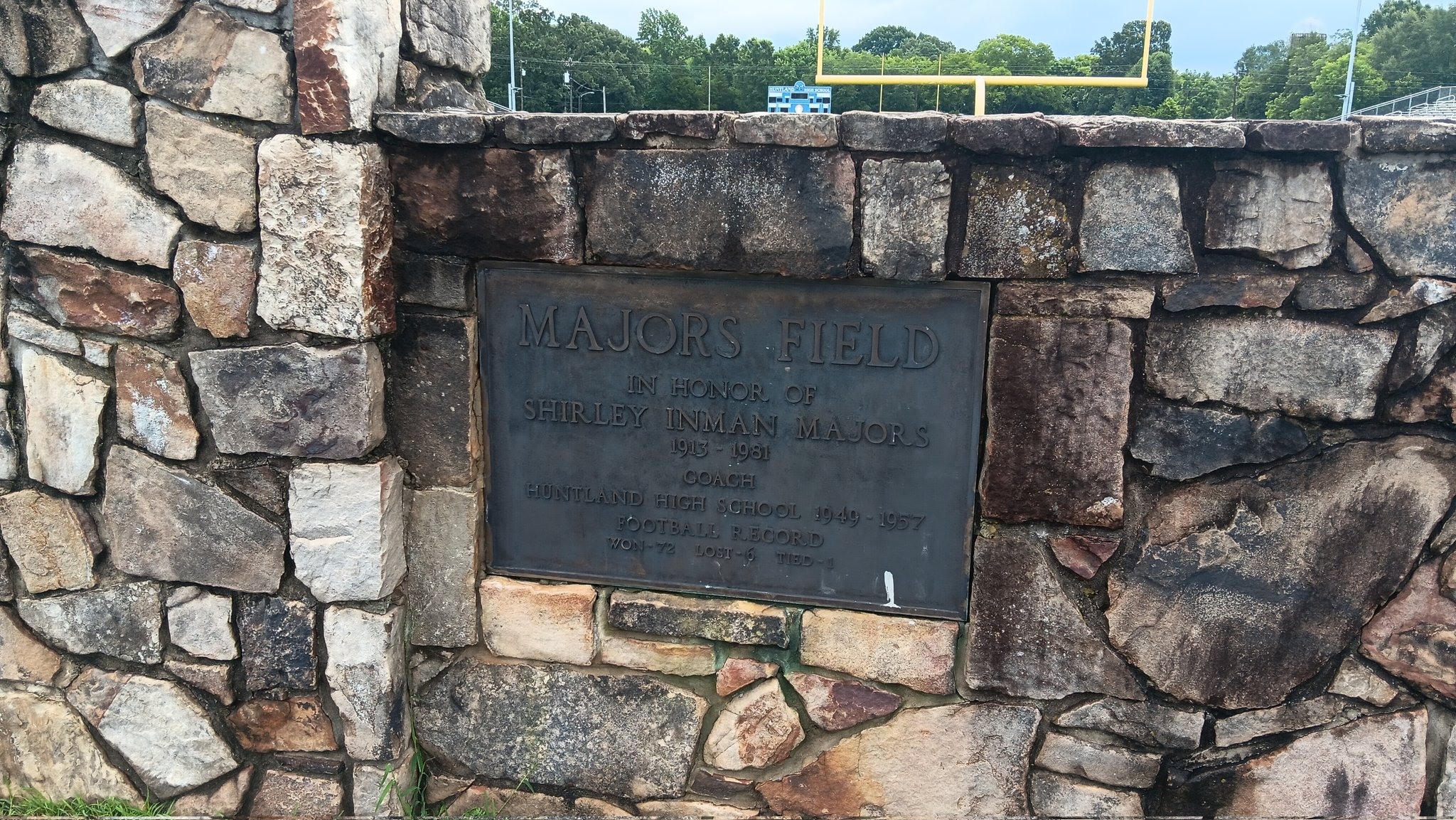
Commemorative plaque at entrance to Majors Field at Huntland High School

Majors was the patriarch of a football family. His sons included two All-Americans in football at the University of Tennessee, Bobby and Johnny, Bill, who was an assistant at Tennessee until his death in an auto accident in 1965, Larry, who played for Sewanee at wingback, and Joe, who played at Florida State University and with the Houston Oilers of the National Football League. The Majors athletes were inducted into the Tennessee Sports Hall of Fame as a family in 1966.

Majors died on April 5, 1981, after collapsing at the Meadowbrook Game Farm near Westmoreland, Tennessee.

== Head coaching record ==
=== College football ===
Year	Team	Overall	Conference	Standing	Bowl/playoffs
Sewanee Tigers (Independent) (1957–1961)
1957	Sewanee	5–2–1			
1958	Sewanee	8–0			
1959	Sewanee	4–3–1			
1960	Sewanee	4–3–1			
1961	Sewanee	5–2–1			
Sewanee Tigers (Collegiate Athletic Conference) (1962–1977)
1962	Sewanee	4–3–1	2–1	2nd	
1963	Sewanee	8–0	4–0	1st	
1964	Sewanee	8–1	3–1	T–1st	
1965	Sewanee	7–1	4–0	1st	
1966	Sewanee	2–6	1–3	T–4th	
1967	Sewanee	5–3	3–1	1st	
1968	Sewanee	4–4	2–2	T–3rd	
1969	Sewanee	2–6	2–2	T–2nd	
1970	Sewanee	2–6	1–3	T–4th	
1971	Sewanee	2–6	1–3	T–4th	
1972	Sewanee	3–5	1–3	T–3rd	
1973	Sewanee	5–3	1–1	2nd	
1974	Sewanee	2–6	2–2	T–3rd	
1975	Sewanee	6–3	4–0	T–1st	
1976	Sewanee	5–4	4–0	1st	
1977	Sewanee	2–6	1–3	T—3rd	
Sewanee:		93–74–5	36–25		
Total:		93–74–5			
National championship Conference title Conference division title or championship game berth
