= Herty Field =

Sports venue in Athens, Georgia, US

Coordinates: 33.955962°N 83.375588°W

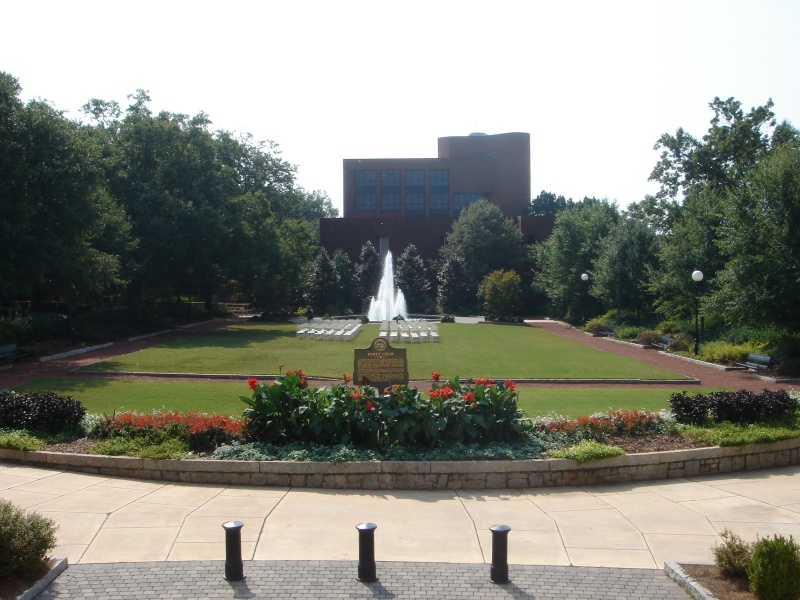
- UGA's first football field, circa 2005.
- Interactive map of Herty Field
- Location: Herty Drive; Athens, Georgia 30602
- Owner: University of Georgia
- Operator: University of Georgia

Construction
- Opened: Fall 1891

Tenants
- Georgia Bulldogs (football, Track and field and baseball)

Herty Field, also known as Alumni Athletic Field, was the original on-campus playing venue for football, Track and field and baseball at the University of Georgia (UGA) in Athens, Georgia. It opened in the Fall of 1891 and hosting the first UGA home football game against Mercer University on January 30, 1892.

Before its use for athletics, the field was a marching ground. Under the direction of Dr. Charles Herty, a professor of chemistry at UGA and the creator of the UGA varsity football and baseball teams, the field was landscaped to host games and practices for the university's varsity and intramural activities.

Outside his faculty duties, Herty also served as the Instructor in Physical Culture from 1894 to 1896 and as Physical Director from 1896 until his resignation from UGA in November 1901. He led efforts to improve the field including raising US$1,900.00 in 1897 from UGA alumni to further landscape the field and build bleachers. The field was originally referred to as Alumni Athletic Field; however, the name was changed to Herty Field after several years.

Herty Field was converted into a parking lot in the 1940s; however, it was converted back into a greenspace in 1999.
