= Sewanee Tigers football =

Football team

- First season: 1891; 135 years ago
- Athletic director: John Shackelford
- Head coach: Joe Freitag; 1st season, 0–0 (–)
- Location: Sewanee, Tennessee
- Stadium: McGee Field (capacity: 1,200)
- Conference: SAA
- Colors: Purple and gold
- All-time record: 489–539–39 (.477)

Conference championships
- 15
- Rivalries: Vanderbilt Commodores; Tennessee Volunteers; Auburn Tigers; Rhodes Lynx
- Website: sewaneetigers.com

The Sewanee Tigers football team represents Sewanee: The University of the South in the sport of American football. The Tigers compete in NCAA Division III as members of the Southern Athletic Association (SAA).

The 1899 Sewanee Tigers football team had three members of the College Football Hall of Fame on its roster: Henry Seibels, Henry D. Phillips, and Frank Juhan.

== History ==
The Sewanee Tigers were pioneers in American intercollegiate athletics and possessed the Deep South's preeminent football program in the 1890s. Ellwood Wilson is considered the "founder of Sewanee football." Their 1899 football team had perhaps the best season in college football history, winning all 12 of their games, 11 by shutout, and outscoring their opponents 322–10. Five of those wins, all shutouts, came in a six-day period while on a 2,500-mile (4,000 km) trip by train. Ten of their 12 opponents, including all five of their road trip victims, remain major college football powers to this day. In 2012, the College Football Hall of Fame held a vote of the greatest historic teams of all time, where the 1899 Iron Men beat the 1961 Alabama Crimson Tide as the greatest team of all time.

Sewanee was a charter member of the Southern Intercollegiate Athletic Association in 1894, and also a charter member of the Southeastern Conference upon its formation in 1932, but by this time its athletic program had declined precipitously and Sewanee never won a conference football game in the eight years it was an SEC member. The Tigers were shut out 26 times in their 37 SEC games, and were outscored by a combined total of 1,163–84.

When vice chancellor Benjamin Ficklin Finney and John Wilson, who had reportedly objected to Sewanee joining the SEC, left his position in 1938, the leading candidate was Alexander Guerry, a former president of the University of Chattanooga. According to a university historian, Guerry agreed to come to Sewanee only if the school stopped awarding athletic scholarships. In 1940, two years after Guerry's arrival, Sewanee withdrew from the SEC and subsequently deemphasized varsity athletics. Guerry's stance is sometimes credited as an early step toward the 1973 creation of NCAA Division III, which prohibits athletic scholarships.

=== "Yea, Sewanee's Right!" ===
"Yea, Sewanee's Right!" is the surviving last line of an old football cheer:

Rip 'em up! Tear 'em up! Leave 'em in the lurch. Down with the heathen. Up with the Church. – Yea, Sewanee's right!

The "heathen" may have been the Methodists of Vanderbilt, which would date the cheer in the 1890s; the cheer was sometimes also used against Hampden-Sydney. It is now used as an alternative motto and often shouted at the end of the Alma Mater. When used with the Alma Mater it is preceded by the transitional formula of an extended pause followed by "Yea, Sewanee's Right!"

== Conference history ==
- Southern Intercollegiate Athletic Association: 1895–1900, 1902–1924
- Southern Conference: 1924–1932
- Southeastern Conference: 1932–1940
- Independent: 1941, 1946–1961
- Southern Collegiate Athletic Conference: 1962–2012
- Southern Athletic Association: 2012–present

== Conference championships ==
Sewanee has won 15 conference championships, nine outright and six shared.

Season	Coach	Conference	Overall record	Conference record
1898	J. G. Jayne	Southern Intercollegiate Athletic Association	4–0	3–0
1899	Billy Suter	Southern Intercollegiate Athletic Association	12–0	11–0
1909	Harris G. Cope	Southern Intercollegiate Athletic Association	6–1	4–0
1963	Shirley Majors	Southern Collegiate Athletic Conference	8–0	4–0
1964 †	Shirley Majors	Southern Collegiate Athletic Conference	8–1	3–1
1965	Shirley Majors	Southern Collegiate Athletic Conference	7–1	4–0
1967	Shirley Majors	Southern Collegiate Athletic Conference	5–3	3–1
1975 †	Shirley Majors	Southern Collegiate Athletic Conference	6–3	4–0
1976	Shirley Majors	Southern Collegiate Athletic Conference	5–4	4–0
1978 †	Horace Moore	Southern Collegiate Athletic Conference	4–4	3–1
1979 †	Horace Moore	Southern Collegiate Athletic Conference	7–2	3–1
1982	Horace Moore	Southern Collegiate Athletic Conference	7–2	4–1
1990 †	Bill Samko	Southern Collegiate Athletic Conference	6–3	3–1
1992	Bill Samko	Southern Collegiate Athletic Conference	8–1	4–0
2000 †	John Windham	Southern Collegiate Athletic Conference	6–4	4–2

† denotes shared championship

== All-Time Sewanee Tigers football team ==
=== First team ===
- E Jenks Gillem
- E Delmas Gooch
- T Jay Dee Patton
- T Thug Murray
- G Lukus White
- G Atticus Kowalski
- G Henry D. Phillips
- G Ephraim Kirby-Smith
- C Frank Juhan
- QB Chigger Browne
- HB Aubrey Lanier
- HB Henry Seibels
- FB Ormond Simkins
- Long Snapper John Hubbard

=== Second team ===
- E Silas Williams
- E Rupert Colmore
- T Lex Stone
- T Frank Faulkinberry
- G Laurie Thompson
- G Bob Taylor Dobbins
- C George Watkins
- QB John Scarbrough
- HB Frank Shipp
- HB Bill Coughlan
- FB Reuben S. Parker
