= W. A. Lambeth =

American college athletic director (1867–1944)

Biographical details
- Born: October 27, 1867; Thomasville, North Carolina, U.S.
- Died: June 24, 1944 (aged 76); Charlottesville, Virginia, U.S.
- Education: University of Virginia

Administrative career (AD unless noted)
- 1892–1922: Virginia

William Alexander Lambeth (October 27, 1867 – June 24, 1944) was an American medical professor who was the first athletic director at the University of Virginia. He is often called "the father of intercollegiate athletics" at the university.

Lambeth was integral in the foundation of the Southern Conference and once a member of the Football Rules Committee. He was the namesake of Lambeth Field; the "Colonnades" where the university used to play football before the building of Scott Stadium. He was also a student of architecture. The Lambeth House, currently used by the Curry School of Education, used to be his residence.

== Early years ==
Lambeth was born October 27, 1867, in Thomasville, North Carolina, the son of a major in the Confederate Army. He was of English ancestry, with forebears from the part of London known as Lambeth.

=== University of Virginia ===
After graduating from local Thomasville High School, he attended the University of Virginia and received his Doctor of Medicine degree in 1892. He had also studied German, physics, chemistry, geology, and biology. He then ran the school's gymnasium while seeking his Ph.D, which he received in June 1898.

=== Harvard ===
In between, he studied at the Harvard School of Physical Training–from which he took a degree in 1895.

== University of Virginia faculty ==
Lambeth was a professor of Materia Medica and Hygiene, Head of the Department of Physical Education, and Superintendent of Buildings and Grounds at his alma mater. He worked on the faculty in one capacity or another for 40 years.

=== Athletics ===
He worked as athletic director as early as 1892 and was a medical adviser on the Virginia Cavaliers football team. He led reforms as part of the Football Rules Committee from 1910 to 1921. He and John Heisman were two who pushed for four quarters rather than two halves to avoid injuries.

In 1888, Lambeth was president of the American Athletic association, and in 1893 he was vice president of the department of physical education at the World's Fair.

== Architecture ==
Lambeth was also a student of architecture with interest in the style of Thomas Jefferson, writing a study of the subject, and of various Italians. "He was interested in all things Italian."

== See also ==
- College Football All-Southern Team

== Bibliography ==
- William Alexander Lambeth; M. D. (1913). Jefferson as an Architect. Houghton Mifflin Company. pp. 1–96.
