= 1905 Southern Intercollegiate Athletic Association football season =

- League: NCAA
- Sport: College football
- Duration: September 30, 1905 through December 3, 1905
- Teams: 16

Regular Season
- Season champions: Vanderbilt

Football seasons
- 1904 1906

1905 Southern Intercollegiate Athletic Association football standings
	Conf.					Overall
Team	W		L		T	W		L		T
Vanderbilt $	5	–	0	–	0	7	–	1	–	0
Georgia Tech	5	–	0	–	1	6	–	0	–	1
LSU	2	–	0	–	0	3	–	0	–	0
Sewanee	3	–	1	–	1	4	–	2	–	1
Clemson	3	–	2	–	1	3	–	2	–	1
Cumberland (TN)	3	–	2	–	0	5	–	4	–	0
Alabama	4	–	4	–	0	6	–	4	–	0
Nashville	0	–	0	–	0	0	–	2	–	0
Auburn	2	–	3	–	0	2	–	4	–	0
Mississippi A&M	1	–	4	–	0	3	–	4	–	0
Tulane	0	–	1	–	0	0	–	1	–	0
Ole Miss	0	–	2	–	0	0	–	2	–	0
Tennessee	0	–	4	–	1	3	–	5	–	1
Georgia	0	–	5	–	0	1	–	5	–	0
$ – Conference champion

The 1905 Southern Intercollegiate Athletic Association football season was the college football games played by the member schools of the Southern Intercollegiate Athletic Association as part of the 1905 college football season. The season began on September 30.

One publication claims "The first scouting done in the South was in 1905, when Dan McGugin and Captain Innis Brown, of Vanderbilt went to Atlanta to see Sewanee play Georgia Tech."

== Season overview ==
=== Results and team statistics ===
Conf. Rank	Team	Head coach	Overall record	Conf. record	PPG	PAG
1	Vanderbilt	Dan McGugin	7–1	5–0	**46.5**	2.8
2	Georgia Tech	John Heisman	6–0–1	5–0–1	30.0	4.7
3	LSU	Dan A. Killian	3–0	2–0	12.0	**0.0**
4	Sewanee	W. C. Hyatt	4–2–1	3–1–1	19.4	16.4
5	Clemson	Eddie Cochems	3–2–1	3–2–1	13.5	10.5
6 (tie)	Alabama	Jack Leavenworth	6–4	4–4	17.8	11.3
6 (tie)	Cumberland	John Counselman	4–4	2–2	9.7	9.6
8	Nashville		0–2	0–0		
9	Auburn	Mike Donahue	2–4	2–4	6.3	16.0
10	Mississippi A&M	Daniel S. Martin	3–4	1–4	16.3	13.4
11 (tie)	Tulane	John F. Tobin	0–1	0–1	0.0	5.0
11 (tie)	Mississippi		0–2	0–1	0.0	14.5
13	Tennessee	James DePree	3–5–1	0–4–1	18.0	16.8
14	Georgia	Marvin M. Dickinson	1–5	0–5	4.3	31.3

Key

PPG = Average of points scored per game
PAG = Average of points allowed per game

=== Regular season ===
Index to colors and formatting
Non-conference matchup; SIAA member won
Non-conference matchup; SIAA member lost
Non-conference matchup; tie
Conference matchup

SIAA teams in bold.

==== Week One ====
Date	Visiting team	Home team	Site	Result	Attendance	Reference
September 30	Tennessee School for the Deaf	**Tennessee**	Baldwin Park • Knoxville, TN	**W** 16–6		
September 30	Maryville (TN)	**Vanderbilt**	Dudley Field • Nashville, TN	**W** 97–0		

==== Week Two ====
Date	Visiting team	Home team	Site	Result	Attendance	Reference
October 3	Maryville (TN)	**Alabama**	The Quad • Tuscaloosa, Alabama	**W** 17–0		
October 6	**Cumberland**	VPI	Gibboney Field • Blacksburg, VA	**L** 0–12		
October 7	North Georgia	**Georgia Tech**	The Flats • Atlanta, GA	**W** 54–0		
October 7	American Temperance	**Tennessee**	Baldwin Park • Knoxville, TN	**W** 104–0		
October 7	**Alabama**	**Vanderbilt**	Dudley Field • Nashville, TN	**VAN** 34–0	1,500	
October 7	Mooney	**Sewanee**	Hardee Field • Sewanee, TN	**W** 42–0		

==== Week Three ====
Date	Visiting team	Home team	Site	Result	Attendance	Reference
October 14	**Mississippi A&M**	**Alabama**	The Quad • Tuscaloosa, AL	**ALA** 34–0		
October 14	**Vanderbilt**	Michigan	Regents Field • Ann Arbor, MI	**L** 0–18		
October 14	**Tennessee**	**Clemson**	Bowman Field • Clemson, SC	**T** 5–5		

==== Week Four ====
Date	Visiting team	Home team	Site	Result	Attendance	Reference
October 20	Davidson	**Auburn**	West End Park • Birmingham, AL	**L** 6–0		
October 20	**Mississippi A&M**	Marion	Marion, AL	**W** 38–0		
October 20	**Cumberland**	**Sewanee**	Nashville, TN	**SEW** 9–0		
October 20	**Nashville**	Southwestern Presbyterian	Clarksville, TN	**L** 0–6		
October 21	**Clemson**	**Georgia**	Herty Field • Athens, GA	**CLEM** 35–0		
October 21	**Alabama**	**Georgia Tech**	The Flats • Atlanta, GA	**GT** 12–5		
October 21	**Vanderbilt**	**Tennessee**	Baldwin Park • Knoxville, TN	**VAN** 45–0		

==== Week Five ====
Date	Visiting team	Home team	Site	Result	Attendance	Reference
October 25	**Alabama**	**Clemson**	State Fairgrounds • Columbia, SC	**CLEM** 25–0		
October 27	**Auburn**	**Mississippi A&M**	Columbus Fairgrounds • Columbus, MS	**AUB** 18–0		
October 28	**Cumberland**	**Georgia Tech**	The Flats • Atlanta, GA	**GT** 18–0		
October 28	**Tennessee**	**Sewanee**	Hardee Field • Sewanee, TN	**SEW** 11–6		
October 28	Texas	**Vanderbilt**	Dudley Field • Nashville, TN	**W** 33–0		

==== Week Six ====
Date	Visiting team	Home team	Site	Result	Attendance	Reference
October 30	**Cumberland**	**Georgia**	Herty Field • Athens, GA	**CUM** 39–0		
October 31	**Cumberland**	Grant	Olympic Park Field • Chattanooga, TN	**W** 11–6		
November 4	**Georgia**	**Alabama**	State Fairgrounds • Birmingham, AL	**ALA** 36–0		
November 4	**Tennessee**	**Georgia Tech**	The Flats • Atlanta, GA	**GT** 45–0		
November 4	**Auburn**	**Vanderbilt**	Dudley Field • Nashville, TN	**VAN** 54–0		

==== Week Seven ====
Date	Visiting team	Home team	Site	Result	Attendance	Reference
November 9	Central University	**Alabama**	The Quad • Tuscaloosa, AL	**W** 21–0		
November 11	**Clemson**	**Auburn**	Drill Field • Auburn, AL	**CLEM** 6–0		
November 11	Howard (AL)	**Mississippi A&M**	Hardy Field • Starkville, MS	**W** 44–0		
November 11	**Cumberland**	Kentucky State	Lexington, KY	**L** 0–12		
November 11	North Georgia	**Georgia**	Herty Field • Athens, GA	**W** 16–12		
November 11	**Sewanee**	**Georgia Tech**	The Flats • Atlanta, GA	**T** 18–18		

==== Week Eight ====
Date	Visiting team	Home team	Site	Result	Attendance	Reference
November 17	**Sewanee**	Texas	Clark Field • Austin, TX	**L** 10–17		
November 18	**Auburn**	**Alabama**	State Fairgrounds • Birmingham, AL	**ALA** 30–0	4,000	
November 18	**Georgia**	**Georgia Tech**	The Flats • Atlanta, GA	**GT** 46–0		
November 18	Louisiana Industrial	**LSU**	State Field • Baton Rouge, LA	**W** 16–0		
November 18	Central University	**Tennessee**	Baldwin Park • Knoxville, TN	**W** 31–5		
November 18	**Clemson**	**Vanderbilt**	Dudley Field • Nashville, TN	**VAN** 41–0		
November 18	**Cumberland**	**Mississippi A&M**	Hardy Field • Starkville, MS	**CUM** 27–5		

==== Week Nine ====
Date	Visiting team	Home team	Site	Result	Attendance	Reference
November 20	**Cumberland**	**Ole Miss**	University Park • Oxford, MS	**CUM** 18–0		
November 23	**Sewanee**	**Alabama**	State Fairgrounds • Birmingham, AL	**SEW** 42–6		
November 25	**LSU**	**Tulane**	Athletic Park • New Orleans, LA	**LSU** 5–0		

==== Week Ten ====
Date	Visiting team	Home team	Site	Result	Attendance	Reference
November 30	Tennessee	Alabama	State Fairgrounds • Birmingham, AL	**ALA** 29–0		
November 30	Auburn	Georgia	Central City Park • Macon, GA	**AUB** 20–0		
November 30	Clemson	Georgia Tech	The Flats • Atlanta, GA	**GT** 17–10	5,000	
November 30	Mississippi A&M	Ole Miss	State Fairgrounds • Jackson, MS	**MSA&M** 11–0		
November 30	Sewanee	Vanderbilt	Dudley Field • Nashville, TN	**VAN** 68–4		
December 1	Mississippi A&M	LSU	State Field • Baton Rouge, LA	**LSU** 15–0		

==== Week Eleven ====
Date	Visiting team	Home team	Site	Result	Attendance	Reference
December 3	**Tennessee**	Grant	Olympic Park • Field Chattanooga, TN	**W** 5–0		

== All-Southern team ==
The composite All-Southern eleven representing the consensus of newspapers as published in Fuzzy Woodruff's A History of Southern Football 1890-1928 included:

Position	Name	Team
QB	Frank Kyle	Vanderbilt
HB	Honus Craig	Vanderbilt
HB	Dan Blake	Vanderbilt
FB	Owsley Manier	Vanderbilt
E	Bob Blake	Vanderbilt
T	Hillsman Taylor	Vanderbilt
G	Stein Stone	Vanderbilt
C	Emma Patterson	Vanderbilt
G	Puss Derrick	Clemson
T	Frank Jones	Auburn
E	Ed Hamilton	Vanderbilt
