= List of Alabama Crimson Tide football seasons =

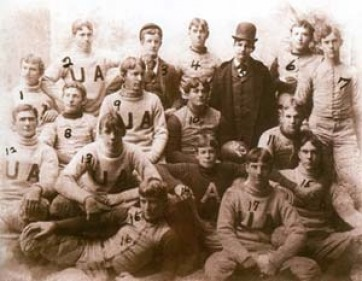
Since the team's founding in 1892, Alabama has played in over 1,100 sanctioned football games.

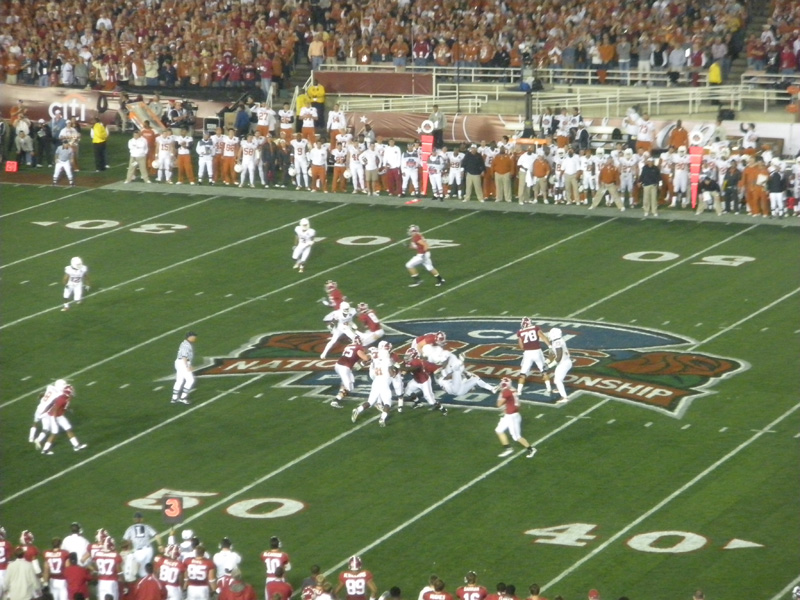
50-yard line action during the 2010 BCS National Championship Game

The Alabama Crimson Tide are a college football team that competes as part of the National Collegiate Athletic Association (NCAA) Division I Football Bowl Subdivision, representing the University of Alabama in the Western Division of the Southeastern Conference (SEC). Alabama has played their home games at Bryant–Denny Stadium in Tuscaloosa, Alabama since 1929.

The Crimson Tide acknowledge 18 national championships, from various and legitimate organizations of their time, 13 of which were awarded by the AP or Coaches' wire-service polls. Alabama has 32 conference championships and holds NCAA records with 73 postseason bowl game appearances and 44 bowl game victories. The Crimson Tide has also had 11 undefeated seasons, a longest winning streak of 28 games between 1978 and 1980 and a home winning streak of 57 games between 1963 and 1982. Alabama leads the SEC West Division with 13 appearances in the SEC Championship Game, and has a winning record against every SEC team. The Associated Press (AP) ranks Alabama 5th all-time in total appearances in the AP Poll. With 954 official wins in over 126 seasons of football, Alabama ranks sixth all-time in win–loss records in the NCAA. (Note: Alabama has had an additional 21 victories vacated (2005–2007) and 8 victories and 1 tie forfeited (1993).)

Football was introduced to the university by W. G. Little in 1892. The first win in the history of the program came in its inaugural game, a 56–0 shutout over Birmingham High School on November 11, 1892. From 1892 to 1894, Alabama competed as a football independent, before they joined the Southern Intercollegiate Athletic Association (SIAA) as a charter member in 1895. From 1895 to 1921, Alabama saw some success, as they had only three losing seasons as a member of the SIAA. In 1922, Alabama left the SIAA and became a charter member of the Southern Conference (SoCon). As a member of the Southern Conference, Alabama won conference championships in 1924, 1925, 1926 and 1930. Additionally, Alabama won their first three National Championships in the 1925, 1926 and 1930 seasons.

By 1933, Alabama again switched conferences, joining the SEC as a charter member. Alabama won the first SEC title in 1933 and its fourth and fifth national championship in the 1934 and 1941 seasons. After winning five national championships and nine conference championships through 1946, Alabama saw a decline between 1946 and 1957 and captured a single conference title. After they only won four games over a period of three seasons, Bear Bryant was hired as head coach in 1958. Under his guidance Alabama won thirteen SEC championships and national championships in the 1961, 1964, 1965, 1973, 1978 and 1979 seasons. After the retirement of Bryant in 1982, Alabama had two coaches, and won one SEC championship before Gene Stallings was hired in 1990. Stallings coached Alabama for seven years, won a national championship in 1992 season, an SEC championship that same season, and four SEC West Division titles. His retirement was followed by a succession of four coaches who only won one SEC championship among them.

In 2007, Alabama hired coach Nick Saban, who led the program to their thirteenth national championship in the 2009 season, fourteenth in the 2011 season, fifteenth in the 2012 season, sixteenth in the 2015 season, seventeenth in the 2017 season, and eighteenth in the 2020 season. Through the 2020 season, Alabama has compiled an official overall record of 929 wins, 331 losses, 43 ties and has appeared in 73 bowl games, with the most recent appearance and win coming in the 2021 College Football Playoff National Championship. On 10 January 2024, Saban announced his retirement. Soon after, on 12 January 2024, Alabama hired head coach Kalen DeBoer from the University of Washington.

== Seasons ==
Year	Coach	Overall	Conference	Standing	Bowl/playoffs	Coaches^{#}	AP^{°}
E. B. Beaumont (Independent) (1892)
1892	E. B. Beaumont	2–2					
Eli Abbott (Independent) (1893–1894)
1893	Eli Abbott	0–4					
1894	Eli Abbott	3–1					
Eli Abbott (Southern Intercollegiate Athletic Association) (1895)
1895	Eli Abbott	0–4	0–2	T–4th			
Otto Wagonhurst (Southern Intercollegiate Athletic Association) (1896)
1896	Otto Wagonhurst	2–1	1–1	T–5th			
Allen McCants (Southern Intercollegiate Athletic Association) (1897)
1897	Allen McCants	1–0	0–0	T–5th			
W. A. Martin (Southern Intercollegiate Athletic Association) (1899)
1899	W. A. Martin	3–1	1–0	3rd			
Malcolm Griffin (Southern Intercollegiate Athletic Association) (1900)
1900	Malcolm Griffin	2–3	1–3	8th			
M. S. Harvey (Southern Intercollegiate Athletic Association) (1901)
1901	M. S. Harvey	2–1–2	2–1–2	6th			
Eli Abbott (Southern Intercollegiate Athletic Association) (1902)
1902	Eli Abbott	4–4	2–4	11th			
W. B. Blount (Southern Intercollegiate Athletic Association) (1903–1904)
1903	W. B. Blount	3–4	3–4	10th			
1904	W. B. Blount	7–3	5–3	5th			
Jack Leavenworth (Southern Intercollegiate Athletic Association) (1905)
1905	Jack Leavenworth	6–4	4–4	7th			
J. W. H. Pollard (Southern Intercollegiate Athletic Association) (1906–1909)
1906	J. W. H. Pollard	5–1	3–1	4th			
1907	J. W. H. Pollard	5–1–2	5–1–2	4th			
1908	J. W. H. Pollard	6–1–1	1–1–1	T–7th			
1909	J. W. H. Pollard	5–1–2	4–1–1	3rd			
Guy Lowman (Southern Intercollegiate Athletic Association) (1910)
1910	Guy Lowman	4–4	0–4	13th			
D. V. Graves (Southern Intercollegiate Athletic Association) (1911–1914)
1911	D. V. Graves	5–2–2	2–2–2	8th			
1912	D. V. Graves	5–3–1	3–3–1	8th			
1913	D. V. Graves	6–3	4–3	6th			
1914	D. V. Graves	5–4	3–3	T–9th			
Thomas Kelley (Southern Intercollegiate Athletic Association) (1915–1917)
1915	Thomas Kelley	6–2	5–0	T–1st			
1916	Thomas Kelley	6–3	4–3	10th			
1917	Thomas Kelley	5–2–1	3–1–1	6th			
Xen C. Scott (Southern Intercollegiate Athletic Association) (1919–1921)
1919	Xen C. Scott	8–1	6–1	T–1st			
1920	Xen C. Scott	10–1	6–1	4th			
1921	Xen C. Scott	5–4–2	2–4–2	16th			
Xen C. Scott (Southern Conference) (1922)
1922	Xen C. Scott	6–3–1	3–2–1	8th			
Wallace Wade (Southern Conference) (1923–1930)
1923	Wallace Wade	7–2–1	4–1–1	4th			
1924	Wallace Wade	8–1	5–0	1st			
1925	Wallace Wade	10–0	7–0	T–1st	W Rose		
1926	Wallace Wade	9–0–1	8–0	1st	T Rose		
1927	Wallace Wade	5–4–1	3–4–1	10th			
1928	Wallace Wade	6–3	6–2	5th			
1929	Wallace Wade	6–3	4–3	11th			
1930	Wallace Wade	10–0	8–0	T–1st	W Rose		
Frank Thomas (Southern Conference) (1931–1932)
1931	Frank Thomas	9–1	7–1	3rd			
1932	Frank Thomas	8–2	5–2	T–5th			
Frank Thomas (Southeastern Conference) (1933–1946)
1933	Frank Thomas	7–1–1	5–0–1	1st			
1934	Frank Thomas	10–0	7–0	T–1st	W Rose		
1935	Frank Thomas	6–2–1	4–2	5th			
1936	Frank Thomas	8–0–1	5–0–1	2nd			4
1937	Frank Thomas	9–1	6–0	1st	L Rose		4
1938	Frank Thomas	7–1–1	4–1–1	T–2nd			13
1939	Frank Thomas	5–3–1	2–3–1	8th			
1940	Frank Thomas	7–2	4–2	4th			
1941	Frank Thomas	9–2	5–2	3rd	W Cotton		20
1942	Frank Thomas	8–3	4–2	5th	W Orange		10
1944	Frank Thomas	5–2–2	3–1–2	4th	L Sugar		
1945	Frank Thomas	10–0	6–0	1st	W Rose		3
1946	Frank Thomas	7–4	4–3	6th			
Harold Drew (Southeastern Conference) (1947–1954)
1947	Harold Drew	8–3	5–2	3rd	L Sugar		6
1948	Harold Drew	6–4–1	4–4–1	6th			
1949	Harold Drew	6–3–1	4–3–1	6th			
1950	Harold Drew	9–2	6–2	3rd		17	16
1951	Harold Drew	5–6	3–5	T–7th			
1952	Harold Drew	10–2	4–2	4th	W Orange	9	9
1953	Harold Drew	6–3–3	4–0–3	1st	L Cotton	11	13
1954	Harold Drew	4–5–2	3–3–2	8th			
Jennings B. Whitworth (Southeastern Conference) (1955–1957)
1955	Jennings B. Whitworth	0–10	0–7	12th			
1956	Jennings B. Whitworth	2–7–1	2–5	T–8th			
1957	Jennings B. Whitworth	2–7–1	1–6–1	10th			
Bear Bryant (Southeastern Conference) (1958–1982)
1958	Bear Bryant	5–4–1	3–4–1	T–6th			
1959	Bear Bryant	7–2–2	4–1–2	4th	L Liberty	13	10
1960	Bear Bryant	8–1–2	5–1–1	3rd	T Bluebonnet	10	9
1961	Bear Bryant	11–0	7–0	T–1st	W Sugar	1	1
1962	Bear Bryant	10–1	6–1	2nd	W Orange	5	5
1963	Bear Bryant	9–2	6–2	2nd	W Sugar	9	8
1964	Bear Bryant	10–1	8–0	1st	L Orange	1	1
1965	Bear Bryant	9–1–1	6–1–1	1st	W Orange	4	1
1966	Bear Bryant	11–0	6–0	T–1st	W Sugar	3	3
1967	Bear Bryant	8–2–1	5–1	2nd	L Cotton	7	8
1968	Bear Bryant	8–3	4–2	T–3rd	L Gator	12	17
1969	Bear Bryant	6–5	2–4	8th	L Liberty		
1970	Bear Bryant	6–5–1	3–4	T–7th	T Astro-Bluebonnet		
1971	Bear Bryant	11–1	7–0	1st	L Orange	2	4
1972	Bear Bryant	10–2	7–1	1st	L Cotton	4	7
1973	Bear Bryant	11–1	8–0	1st	L Sugar	1	4
1974	Bear Bryant	11–1	6–0	1st	L Orange	2	5
1975	Bear Bryant	11–1	6–0	1st	W Sugar	3	3
1976	Bear Bryant	9–3	5–2	3rd	W Liberty	9	11
1977	Bear Bryant	11–1	7–0	1st	W Sugar	2	2
1978	Bear Bryant	11–1	6–0	1st	W Sugar	2	1
1979	Bear Bryant	12–0	6–0	1st	W Sugar	1	1
1980	Bear Bryant	10–2	5–1	T–2nd	W Cotton	6	6
1981	Bear Bryant	9–2–1	6–0	T–1st	L Cotton	6	7
1982	Bear Bryant	8–4	3–3	T–5th	W Liberty	17	
Ray Perkins (Southeastern Conference) (1983–1986)
1983	Ray Perkins	8–4	4–2	T–3rd	W Sun	12	15
1984	Ray Perkins	5–6	2–4	T–7th			
1985	Ray Perkins	9–2–1	4–1–1	T–3rd	W Aloha	14	13
1986	Ray Perkins	10–3	4–2	T–2nd	W Sun	9	9
Bill Curry (Southeastern Conference) (1987–1989)
1987	Bill Curry	7–5	4–2	4th	L Hall of Fame		
1988	Bill Curry	9–3	4–3	4th	W Sun	17	17
1989	Bill Curry	10–2	6–1	T–1st	L Sugar	7	9
Gene Stallings (Southeastern Conference) (1990–1996)
1990	Gene Stallings	7–5	5–2	T–3rd	L Fiesta		
1991	Gene Stallings	11–1	6–1	2nd	W Blockbuster	5	5
1992	Gene Stallings	13–0	8–0	1st (Western)	W Sugar^{†}	1	1
1993 (Note: Alabama finished the 1993 season with an overall record of 9–3–1, 5–2–1 in conference play, but was later forced to officially forfeit all regular season games as a penalty due to NCAA infractions.)	Gene Stallings	9-3-1	5-2-1	2nd (Western) (Note: Alabama finished second in the SEC West in 1993, but played in the SEC Championship Game as Auburn was prohibited from post-season play because of NCAA violations.)	W Gator^{†}	13	14
1994	Gene Stallings	12–1	8–0	1st (Western)	W Florida Citrus	4	5
1995 (Note: The 1995 team was ineligible to win the conference title, to be selected to a bowl, or to be selected in the coaches poll due to a one-year bowl ban imposed by the NCAA for rules violations.)	Gene Stallings	8–3	5–3	T–2nd (Western)			21
1996	Gene Stallings	10–3	6–2	T–1st (Western)	W Outback	11	11
Mike DuBose (Southeastern Conference) (1997–2000)
1997	Mike DuBose	4–7	2–6	5th (Western)			
1998	Mike DuBose	7–5	4–4	T–3rd (Western)	L Music City		
1999	Mike DuBose	10–3	7–1	1st (Western)	L Orange^{†}	8	8
2000	Mike DuBose	3–8	3–5	T–4th (Western)			
Dennis Franchione (Southeastern Conference) (2001–2002)
2001	Dennis Franchione	7–5	4–4	T–3rd (Western)	W Independence		
2002 (Note: Alabama finished the 2002 season with an overall record of 10–3, but was ineligible for postseason play or to be selected in the coaches poll as a result of a two-year bowl ban imposed by the NCAA due to recruiting violations.)	Dennis Franchione	10–3	6–2	1st (Western) (Note: Alabama finished first in the SEC West in 2002, but could not play in the SEC Championship Game due to NCAA sanctions.)			11
Mike Shula (Southeastern Conference) (2003–2006)
2003	Mike Shula	4–9	2–6	5th (Western)			
2004	Mike Shula	6–6	3–5	3rd (Western)	L Music City		
2005 (Note: The NCAA ruled Alabama to vacate 21 victories between the 2005–07 seasons due to sanctions stemming from textbook-related infractions.)	Mike Shula	10-2	6–2	3rd (Western)	W Cotton	8	8
2006	Mike Shula	6–7	2–6	4th (Western)	L Independence (Note: Independence Bowl was coached by interim head coach Joe Kines.)		
Nick Saban (Southeastern Conference) (2007–2023)
2007	Nick Saban	7–6	4–4	T–3rd (Western)	W Independence		
2008	Nick Saban	12–2	8–0	1st (Western)	L Sugar^{†}	6	6
2009	Nick Saban	14–0	8–0	1st (Western)	W BCS NCG^{†}	1	1
2010	Nick Saban	10–3	5–3	4th (Western)	W Capital One	11	10
2011	Nick Saban	12–1	7–1	2nd (Western)	W BCS NCG^{†}	1	1
2012	Nick Saban	13–1	7–1	1st (Western)	W BCS NCG^{†}	1	1
2013	Nick Saban	11–2	7–1	T–1st (Western)	L Sugar^{†}	8	7
2014	Nick Saban	12–2	7–1	1st (Western)	L Sugar^{†} (CFP Semifinal)	4	4
2015	Nick Saban	14–1	7–1	1st (Western)	W Cotton^{†} (CFP Semifinal); W CFP NCG^{†}	1	1
2016	Nick Saban	14–1	8–0	1st (Western)	W Peach^{†} (CFP Semifinal); L CFP NCG^{†}	2	2
2017	Nick Saban	13–1	7–1	T–1st (Western)	W Sugar^{†} (CFP Semifinal); W CFP NCG^{†}	1	1
2018	Nick Saban	14–1	8–0	1st (Western)	W Orange^{†} (CFP Semifinal); L CFP NCG^{†}	2	2
2019	Nick Saban	11–2	6–2	2nd (Western)	W Citrus	8	8
2020	Nick Saban	13–0	10–0	1st (Western)	W Rose^{†} (CFP Semifinal); W CFP NCG^{†}	1	1
2021	Nick Saban	13–2	7–1	1st (Western)	W Cotton^{†} (CFP Semifinal); L CFP NCG^{†}	2	2
2022	Nick Saban	11–2	6–2	T–1st (Western)	W Sugar^{†}	5	5
2023	Nick Saban	12–2	8–0	1st (Western)	L Rose^{†} (CFP Semifinal)	5	5
Kalen DeBoer (Southeastern Conference) (2024–present)
2024	Kalen DeBoer	9–4	5–3	T–4th	L ReliaQuest	17	17
2025	Kalen DeBoer	11–4	7–1	T–1st	W CFP First Round^{†} L Rose^{†} (CFP Quarterfinal)	9	9
Total:		964–341–43					
National championship Conference title Conference division title or championship game berth
^{†}Indicates Bowl Coalition, Bowl Alliance, BCS, or CFP / New Years' Six bowl.; ^{#}Rankings from final Coaches Poll.; ^{°}Rankings from final AP Poll.
