= 1905 Vanderbilt Commodores football team =

American college football season

1905 Vanderbilt Commodores football
- Michigan coach Fielding Yost sits in the center next to coach McGugin.

SIAA champion
- Conference: Southern Intercollegiate Athletic Association
- Record: 7–1 (6–0 SIAA)
- Head coach: Dan McGugin (2nd season)
- Offensive scheme: Short punt
- Captain: Innis Brown
- Home stadium: Dudley Field

1905 Southern Intercollegiate Athletic Association football standings
	Conf.					Overall
Team	W		L		T	W		L		T
Vanderbilt $	5	–	0	–	0	7	–	1	–	0
Georgia Tech	5	–	0	–	1	6	–	0	–	1
LSU	2	–	0	–	0	3	–	0	–	0
Sewanee	3	–	1	–	1	4	–	2	–	1
Clemson	3	–	2	–	1	3	–	2	–	1
Cumberland (TN)	3	–	2	–	0	5	–	4	–	0
Alabama	4	–	4	–	0	6	–	4	–	0
Nashville	0	–	0	–	0	0	–	2	–	0
Auburn	2	–	3	–	0	2	–	4	–	0
Mississippi A&M	1	–	4	–	0	3	–	4	–	0
Tulane	0	–	1	–	0	0	–	1	–	0
Ole Miss	0	–	2	–	0	0	–	2	–	0
Tennessee	0	–	4	–	1	3	–	5	–	1
Georgia	0	–	5	–	0	1	–	5	–	0
$ – Conference champion

The 1905 Vanderbilt Commodores football team represented Vanderbilt University during the 1905 Southern Intercollegiate Athletic Association football season. The team's head coach was Dan McGugin, who served his second season in that capacity. Members of the Southern Intercollegiate Athletic Association, the Commodores played six home games in Nashville, Tennessee and finished the season with a record 7–1 overall and 6–0 in SIAA, outscoring their opponents 372–22. Vanderbilt played seven home games and won them all including six shutout victories.

Their only loss came on the road to McGugin's old team, Michigan, 18–0. From 1903 to 1905 Vandy won 13 consecutive games and was 22–2–1 in those three seasons. They finish the 1905 season with a 17-game home win streak. The streak reached 26 games before Michigan stopped them on November 2, 1907.

== Schedule ==
Date	Opponent	Site	Result	Attendance	Source
September 30	Maryville (TN)*	Dudley Field; Nashville, TN	W 97–0		
October 7	Alabama	Dudley Field; Nashville, TN	W 34–0	1,500	
October 14	Michigan*	Regents Field; Ann Arbor, MI	L 0–18		
October 21	Tennessee	Baldwin Park; Knoxville, TN (rivalry)	W 45–0		
October 28	Texas*	Dudley Field; Nashville, TN	W 33–0		
November 4	Auburn^{†}	Dudley Field; Nashville, TN	W 54–0		
November 18	Clemson	Dudley Field; Nashville, TN	W 41–0		
November 30	Sewanee	Dudley Field; Nashville, TN (rivalry)	W 68–4		
*Non-conference game; ^{†}Homecoming

== Before the season ==
The team was captained by Innis Brown, later a prominent sportswriter.

== Game summaries ==
=== Maryville (TN) ===
The season opened with a big win, 97–0 over the Maryville Scots. Owsley Manier scored eight touchdowns.

Coach McGugin said "The boys went at it hammer and tongs, and, considering the heat and short halves, they put up a fine game."

The starting lineup was B. Blake (left end), Taylor (left tackle), Stone (left guard), Patterson (center), Brown (right guard), Pritchard (right tackle), Hamilton (right end), Kyle (quarterback), D. Blake (left halfback), Craig (right halfback), Manier (fullback).

=== Alabama ===
Alabama was no match for Vanderbilt, losing 34–0. Honus Craig was the star of the game. Quarterback Frank Kyle was severely injured, knocked unconscious and taken to the hospital.

The starting lineup was Brown (left end), Taylor (left tackle), Stone (left guard), Patterson (center), Sherrell (right guard), Pritchard (right tackle), Hamilton (right end), Kyle (quarterback), D. Blake (left halfback), Craig (right halfback), Manier (fullback).

=== Michigan ===
In the fifth game of the season, Vanderbilt suffered its first loss under coach McGugin, to his mentor and brother in law Fielding H. Yost and his Michigan Wolverines in Ann Arbor 18–0. Tom Hammond, Joe Curtis, and John Garrels scored Michigan's three touchdowns. The longest was by Hammond, of 20 yards. Vanderbilt did not make a single first down.

The starting lineup was Hamilton (left end), Pritchard (left tackle), Brown (left guard), Patterson (center), Stone (right guard), Taylor (right tackle), B. Blake (right end), Kyle (quarterback), Craig (left halfback), D. Blake (right halfback), Manier (fullback).

=== Tennessee ===
Tennessee at Vanderbilt

Team	1	2	Total
Tennessee	0	0	0
• Vanderbilt	24	21	45

- Date: October 21
- Location: Curry Field • Nashville, Tennessee
- Referee: Bachman

Vanderbilt beat the rival Tennessee Volunteers by a score of 45–0. The Vols were coached by fellow Michigan alum James DePree. Coach McGugin remarked: "Depree was a very valuable man to Michigan athletics and has lots of friends there who are watching his work." Sam Y. Parker sat out the game with injury. Dan Blake made the first three touchdowns.

The starting lineup was Brown (left end), Taylor (left tackle), McLain (left guard), Patterson (center), Sherrell (right guard), Pritchard (right tackle), Hamilton (right end), Kyle (quarterback), D. Blake (left halfback), Craig (right halfback), Manier (fullback).

=== Texas ===
The Commodores defeated the Texas Longhorns, seen as the strongest of the other contenders for the SIAA, by a score of 33–0. ""Honus" Craig, whom no one has ever yet stopped, played probably the greatest game ever put up by a Commodore."

The starting lineup was B. Blake (left end), Taylor (left tackle), Brown (left guard), Patterson (center), Stone (right guard), Pritchard (right tackle), Hamilton (right end), Kyle (quarterback), D. Blake (left halfback), Craig (right halfback), Manier (fullback).

=== Auburn ===
The Commodores dominated the Auburn Tigers 54–0, playing the whole game in their territory. Last season, Auburn and Vanderbilt disputed the SIAA title.

The starting lineup was B. Blake (left end), Taylor (left tackle), Brown (left guard), Patterson (center), Stone (right guard), Pritchard (right tackle), Hamilton (right end), Haygood (quarterback), D. Blake (left halfback), Craig (right halfback), Manier (fullback).

=== Clemson ===
Clemson at Vanderbilt

Team	1	2	Total
Clemson	0	0	0
• Vanderbilt	17	24	41

- Date: November 19
- Location: Curry Field • Nashville, Tennessee
- Referee: Bradley Walker

The Commodores beat the Clemson Tigers 41–0. Owsley Manier went through for the first two touchdowns. The third was scored by Taylor, a 12-yard run just before the end of the first half.

The starting lineup was B. Blake (left end), Taylor (left tackle), Stone (left guard), Patterson (center), Brown (right guard), Pritchard (right tackle), Hamilton (right end), Kyle (quarterback), D. Blake (left halfback), Craig (right halfback), Manier (fullback).

=== Sewanee ===
Vanderbilt crushed a strong Sewanee squad 68–4. One publication claims "The first scouting done in the South was in 1905, when Dan McGugin and Captain Innis Brown, of Vanderbilt went to Atlanta to see Sewanee play Georgia Tech." John Scarbrough made Sewanee's only points on a 35-yard field goal. On the dedication of Harris Stadium, one writer noted "The University of the South has numbered among its athletes some of the greatest. Anyone who played against giant Henry Phillips in 1901–1903 felt that he was nothing less than the best as guard and fullback. Anyone who ever saw a punt from the foot of J. W. Scarbrough." Honus Craig once ran 60 yards for a touchdown.

The starting lineup was B. Blake (left end), Taylor (left tackle), Brown (left guard), Patterson (center), Stone (right guard), Pritchard (right tackle), Hamilton (right end), Kyle (quarterback), Noel (left halfback), Craig (right halfback), Manier (fullback).

== Personnel ==
=== Depth chart ===
The following chart provides a visual depiction of Vanderbilt's lineup during the 1905 season with games started at the position reflected in parentheses. The chart mimics a short punt formation while on offense, with the quarterback under center.

LE
Bob Blake (5)
Innis Brown (2)
Ed Hamilton (1)

LT	LG	C	RG	RT
Hillsman Taylor (7)	Innis Brown (4)	Emma Patterson (8)	Stein Stone (4)	Joe Pritchard (7)
Joe Pritchard (1)	Stein Stone (3)	Fatty Hobbs (0)	Innis Brown (2)	Hillsman Taylor (1)
Clarence Fugler (0)	Fatty McLain (1)	Stein Stone (0)	Horace Sherrell (2)	

RE
Ed Hamilton (7)
Bob Blake (1)
Vaughn Blake (0)

QB
Frank Kyle (7)
Jimmy R. Haygood (1)

LHB	RHB
Dan Blake (6)	Honus Craig (7)
Honus Craig (1)	Dan Blake (1)
Oscar Noel (1)	Guy Crawford (0)

FB
Owsley Manier (8)

-

== Bibliography ==
- Woodruff, Fuzzy (1928). A History of Southern Football 1890–1928. Vol. 1.
