= Counselman =

Counselman is a surname. Notable people with the surname include:

- John Counselman (1880–1955), American football player, coach, professor, and civil engineer
- Mary Elizabeth Counselman (1911–1995), American short story writer and poet

== See also ==
- 3528 Counselman, main-belt asteroid
