= Eddie Cochems =

American football player and coach (1877–1953)

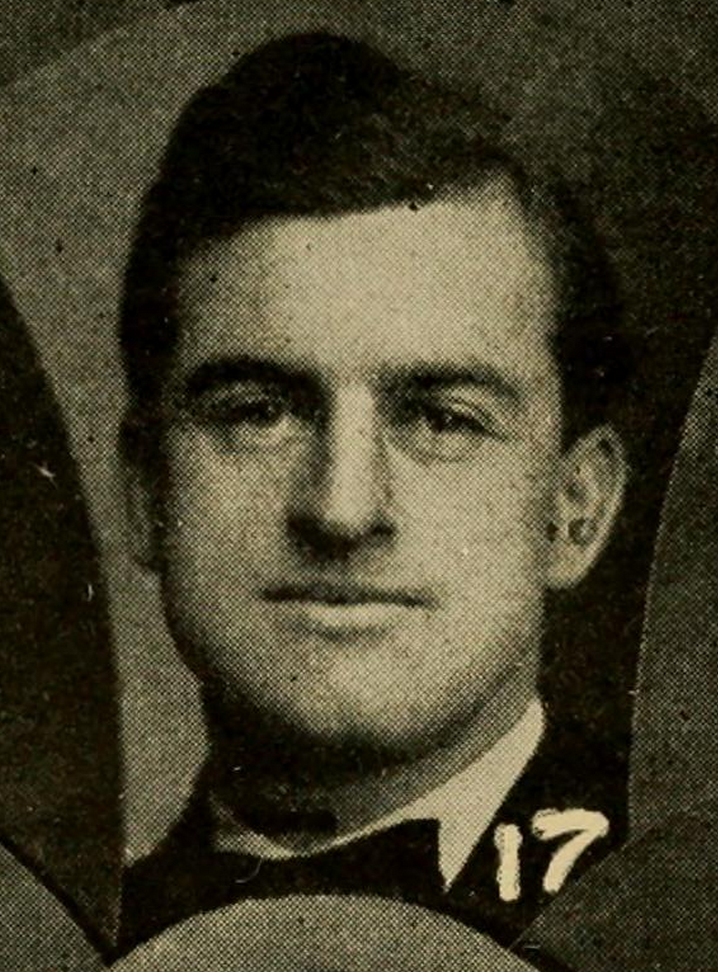
- Cochems, c. 1906, at Saint Louis

Biographical details
- Born: February 4, 1877; Sturgeon Bay, Wisconsin, U.S.
- Died: April 9, 1953 (aged 76); Madison, Wisconsin, U.S.

Playing career

Football
- 1898–1901: Wisconsin
- Positions: Halfback, end

Coaching career (HC unless noted)

Football
- 1902–1903: North Dakota Agricultural
- 1904: Wisconsin (assistant)
- 1905: Clemson
- 1906–1908: Saint Louis
- 1914: Maine

Baseball
- 1908: Saint Louis

Head coaching record
- Overall: 42–11–2 (football)

Edward Bulwer Cochems (/ˈkoʊkəmz/; February 4, 1877 – April 9, 1953) was an American football player and coach. He played football for the University of Wisconsin from 1898 to 1901 and was the head football coach at North Dakota Agricultural College—now known as North Dakota State University (1902–1903), Clemson University (1905), Saint Louis University (1906–1908), and the University of Maine (1914). During his three years at Saint Louis, he was the first football coach to build an offense around the forward pass, which became a legal play in the 1906 college football season. Using the forward pass, Cochems' 1906 team compiled an undefeated 11–0 record, led the nation in scoring, and outscored opponents by a combined score of 407 to 11. He is considered by some to be the "father of the forward pass" in American football.

== Early life ==
Cochems was born in 1877 at Sturgeon Bay, the county seat of Door County on Wisconsin's Door Peninsula. He was one of 11 children, and "the smallest of seven brothers." His older brother, Henry Cochems, preceded him at the University of Wisconsin-Madison, where he was a star football player and shot putter. Cochems also had a twin brother, Carl Cochems (1877–1954), who became a noted opera singer.

== Athlete at Wisconsin ==
Cochems attended the University of Wisconsin-Madison, where he competed for the Badgers in football, baseball and track. He was the captain of the 1901 Wisconsin baseball team, but he gained his greatest acclaim as a football player. Cochems began playing at the left end position, but was moved to the left halfback position for the 1900 and 1901 seasons. The Badgers football team posted a 35–4–1 record during his four seasons of play. Together with Norsky Larson and Keg Driver, Cochems reportedly made up "the most feared backfield trio in the middle west."

Max Loeb, a classmate, remembered Cochems as "one of the most spectacular men of my time ... [w]onderfully built, handsome and affable ..." After Cochem's death, another classmate, O.G. Erickson, wrote:

While well muscled and compactly built, Cochems never weighed more than 165 pounds, but I never saw another player who made better use of his poundage. He played four years of 70-minute football (a game then consisted of two 35-minute halves), and I don't remember him ever being taken out of a game because of injuries.

After Cochems helped the Badgers to a 50–0 win over Kansas in 1901, the Chicago Daily Tribune reported, "Larson and Cochems again and again skirted the Kansas ends for gains of forty, fifty, sixty and seventy yards. Nothing approaching the play of the Badgers trio of backs, Larson, Driver and Cochems, has ever been seen on Randall Field."

On November 28, 1901, in his final game as a Wisconsin football player, Cochems ran back a kickoff for a touchdown against Amos Alonzo Stagg's Chicago Maroons. According to a contemporaneous press account, the touchdown run came late in the game with Wisconsin already leading 29 to 0: "The Maroons appeared to be demoralized, and on the kick-off Cochems caught the ball on his own twelve-yard line and ran ninety-eight yards for a touchdown, the Chicago players making little or no effort to stop him." Twelve years later, football historian and former University of Wisconsin coach Parke H. Davis described the same run more colorfully, reporting that Cochems "dashed and dodged, plunged and writhed through all opponents for a touch-down... Cochem's great flight presented all of the features of speed, skill, and chance which must combine to, make possible the full-field run... he boldly laid his course against the very center of Chicago's oncoming forwards, bursting their central bastion, and then cleverly sprinting and dodging the secondary defenders." According to Cochems' obituary in the Wisconsin alumnus, his kickoff return against Chicago in 1901 "brought him undying fame as a gridder."

Cochems also scored two touchdowns in a 39–5 victory over Chicago in November 1900, and has been credited with four touchdowns in a 54–0 win against Notre Dame in 1900.

Cochems was also a bicycling enthusiast who gained attention for a 1900 bicycle trip across Europe with classmate George Mowry. The pair left Wisconsin on August 1, 1900, and rode through England, Scotland, Belgium, Holland, France, Germany, Austria, Italy and Spain. Their cyclometers were stolen after they had completed 1,500 miles, and they had no record of the full distance they covered. The entire trip cost each of the two $125. On their return to Wisconsin, they were dressed in "well-worn knickerbockers" that "gave plain evidence of much exposure to variable weather and of hard riding."

== Early coaching career ==
In 1902, Cochems at age 25 was hired as the head football coach at North Dakota Agricultural College (now North Dakota State University) at Fargo. He led the North Dakota Aggies to an undefeated and unscored upon record in 1902, outscoring opponents by a combined 168 to 0. His 1903 team at North Dakota Agricultural College finished with five wins and one loss.

In January 1904, the University of Wisconsin athletic board voted to select Cochems to serve as the school's assistant football coach at a salary of $800. Cochems returned to Madison in 1904 as both assistant football coach and assistant athletic director.

In December 1904, the selection of a new head coach at Wisconsin was put to a straw vote with Cochems running against Phil King and two other candidates. King received 215 of the 325 votes cast.

Having lost his bid for the head coaching job, Cochems signed in February 1905 to become the head football coach at Clemson. In the 1905 football season, Cochems led Clemson to shutout wins over Georgia (35–0), Alabama (25–0), and Auburn (6–0), but closed the season with consecutive losses to Vanderbilt and Georgia Tech, for a 3–2–1 record.

== St. Louis University ==
=== Preparation to play under the new rules ===
In February 1906, Cochems was hired as the head football coach at St. Louis University. The 1906 college football season was played with new rules, which included legalizing the forward pass. Cochems had reportedly long been an enthusiast of the forward pass.

At St. Louis, Cochems rejoined fellow Wisconsiner and former Badger halfback Bradbury Robinson. They had met in the pre-season of 1905 when Robinson, who had already transferred to St. Louis, was working out with his former Wisconsin teammates. Cochems was an assistant coach with the Badgers that year.

Like Cochems, Robinson was fascinated by the potential of the forward pass. Robinson was introduced to the forward pass in 1904 by Wisconsin teammate, H.P. Savage, who threw the ball overhand almost as far as Robinson was punting it to him. Savage taught Robinson how to throw a spiral pass, and the forward pass thereafter became Robinson's "football hobby."

To prepare for the first season under the new rules, Cochems convinced the university to allow him to take his team to a Jesuit sanctuary at Lake Beulah in southern Wisconsin for "the sole purpose of studying and developing the pass." Newbery Medal winning author Harold Keith wrote in Esquire magazine that it was at Lake Beulah in August 1906 that "the first, forward pass system ever devised" was born.

=== Football's first legal forward pass ===
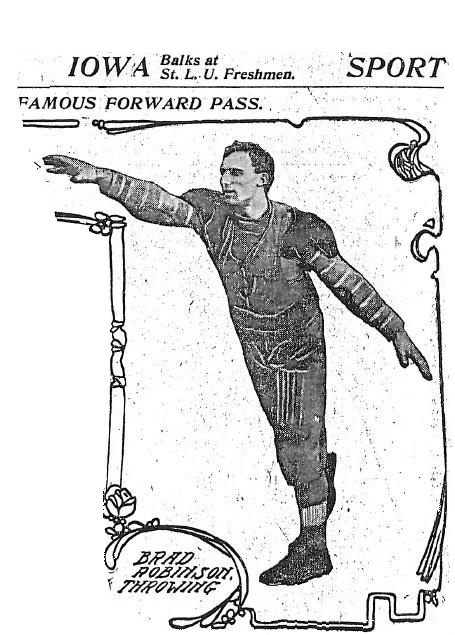
St. Louis Post-Dispatch photograph of Brad Robinson throwing a forward pass, November 28, 1906, from an article previewing the game with Iowa the next afternoon

On September 5, 1906, in the first game of the 1906 season, St. Louis faced Carroll College, and it was in that game that Robinson threw football's first legal forward pass to Jack Schneider.

Cochems reportedly did not start calling pass plays in the Carroll game until after he had grown frustrated with the failure of his offense to move the ball on the ground. After an initial pass attempt from Robinson to Schneider fell incomplete (resulting in a turnover to Carroll under the 1906 rules), Cochems called for his team to again execute the play he called the "air attack" or the "projectile pass." Robinson threw the fat, rugby-style ball for a 20-yard touchdown pass to Schneider. St. Louis won the game by a score of 22–0.

=== 1906 season ===
St. Louis completed the 1906 season undefeated (11–0) and led the nation in scoring, having outscored opponents by a combined 407 to 11. During the 1906 season, the forward pass was a key element in the St. Louis offense. Bradbury Robinson threw a 67-yard pass, and Jack Schneider threw a 65-yard pass. In his book on the history of the sport, David Nelson wrote, "Considering the size, shape and weight of the ball, these were extraordinary passes."

The highlight of the 1906 season was St. Louis' 39–0 win against Iowa. St. Louis completed eight of ten pass attempts (for an average of 20 yards) against Iowa, and four of the passes resulted in touchdowns. On the last play of the game, St. Louis threw a final pass 25 yards in the air to a receiver who caught the ball "on the dead run" for a touchdown. Cochems said that Iowa's poor showing in the game "resulted from its use of the old style play and its failure to effectively use the forward pass", as Iowa attempted only "two basketball-style forward passes."

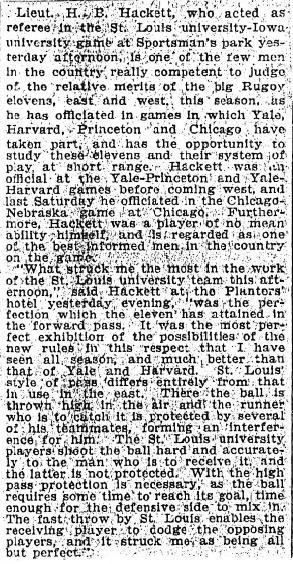
Referee Hackett's analysis of St. Louis' passing game against Iowa, St. Louis Globe-Democrat, written by Ed Wray, November 30, 1906

The 1906 Iowa game was refereed by one of the top football officials in the country, West Point's Lt. Horatio B. "Stuffy" Hackett, who became a member of the American Intercollegiate Football Rules Committee in December 1907. Hackett later told a reporter, "It was the most perfect exhibition... of the new rules ... that I have seen all season and much better than that of Yale and Harvard. St. Louis' style of pass differs entirely from that in use in the east. ... The St. Louis university players shoot the ball hard and accurately to the man who is to receive it ... The fast throw by St. Louis enables the receiving player to dodge the opposing players, and it struck me as being all but perfect."

Hackett's analysis was reprinted in newspapers across the country, and when it appeared in The Washington Post, the headline read: "FORWARD PASS IN WEST – Lieut. Hackett Says St. Louis University Has Peer of Them All. – Says that Mound City Champions Showed Nearest Approach to Perfect Pass He Has Seen This Year."

Knute Rockne biographer, Ray Robinson, wrote, "The St. Louis style of forward pass, as implemented by Cochems, was different from the pass being thrown by eastern players. Cochems did not protect his receiver by surrounding him with teammates, as was the case in the East."

=== Cochems as advocate of the forward pass ===
After the 1906 season, Cochems published a 10-page article entitled "The Forward Pass and On-Side Kick" in the 1907 edition of Spalding's How to Play Foot Ball (edited by Walter Camp). Cochems explained in words and photographs (of Robinson) how the forward pass could be thrown and how passing skills could be developed. "[T]he necessary brevity of this article will not permit of a detailed discussion of the forward pass," Cochems lamented. "Should I begin to explain the different plays in which the pass... could figure, I would invite myself to an endless task."

In December 1909, The Washington Post published Cochems comments on the game under the headline, "FOOTBALL LIKE AN AIRSHIP WOULD OPEN UP THE GAME." Cochems advocated the redesign of the football to render it more aerodynamic and easy to handle:

The story in a nutshell is this. The ball is too large and too light. Some of the best teams in the country find it impossible to use the pass owing to lack of players who can make it. ... Since it is impossible to grow larger hands and it is possible to make the ball conform to human dimensions, why not make the ball fit the needed conditions? ... With a ball such as I have proposed, longer, narrower, and a bit heavier, so that it would carry in the face of a strong wind, I firmly believe that the game of rugby would develop into one of the most beautiful and versatile sports the world ever saw.

Cochems' recommendations essentially describe the modern football. In 1909, he had accurately predicted, "With the new ball, deeper offensive formations could be logically planned and carried into execution."

In a 1932 interview with a Wisconsin sports columnist, Cochems claimed that Yale, Harvard and Princeton (the so-called "Big Three" football powers in the early decades of the sport) all called him in having him explain the forward pass to them.

=== Failure of the forward pass to catch on quickly ===
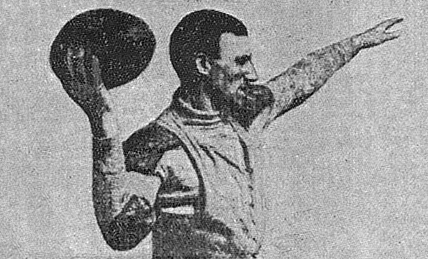
Brad Robinson demonstrating "Overhand spiral—fingers on lacing" in "The Forward Pass and On-Side Kick" an article in Spalding's How to Play Foot Ball, American Sports Publishing, Revised 1907 edition, written by Eddie Cochems, Walter Camp, Editor

Cochems was disappointed that his pass-oriented offense did not catch on quickly. In 1907, after the first season of the forward pass, one football writer noted that, "with the single exception of Cochems, football teachers were groping in the dark."

It would be seven years before Knute Rockne began to follow Cochems' example at Notre Dame. Rockne acknowledged Cochems as the early leader in the use of the pass, observing, "One would have thought that so effective a play would have been instantly copied and become the vogue. The East, however, had not learned much or cared much about Midwest and western football; ondeed, the East scarcely realized that football existed beyond the Alleghanies ..."

In his history of the game, College Football Hall of Fame coach and football authority David M. Nelson echoed Rockne's point, noting that "eastern football had little respect for football west of Carlise, Pennsylvania... [they] may not have recognized what was happening in the West, but the new forward-passing game was off to an impressive start."

Author Murray Greenberg, in his biography of 1920s passing sensation Benny Friedman, agreed that the passing game as Cochems implemented it just did not catch on: "Cochems and his St. Louis eleven aside, rarely during the early part of the century's second decade did a team try to dominate the game through the air."

=== 1907 and 1908 seasons ===
Cochems led the St. Louis football team to a record of 7–3–1 in 1907. In September 1907, Cochems introduced another innovation at St. Louis, having his players wear numbers to allow spectators to identify individual players. The move was called "a decided innovation" and was compared to the numbering of jockeys in horse-racing. Cochems team defeated the Nebraska Cornhuskers on November 28, 1907, by a score of 34 to 0. Cochems took his team to the West Coast for a Christmas Day game against Washington State College. St. Louis lost the game by a score of 11 to 0. The 1907 team was "Varsity-Trans-Mississippi champions".

After the 1907 season, charges that Cochems was using professional players were made. Several Midwestern universities, including Kansas, Missouri, Iowa and Wisconsin, refused to schedule games with St. Louis for the 1908 season, "claiming the team is tainted with professionals."

In 1908, Cochems' team compiled a record of 7–2–1, defeating the Arkansas (24–0), but losing games to Pittsburgh (13–0) and the Carlisle (17–0) and playing Sewanee to a tie.

On January 1, 1909, Cochems coached a St. Louis all-star football team against a Chicago all-star football game coached by Walter Eckersall. The game drew extensive publicity when St. Louis Browns pitcher Rube Waddell asked Cochems to play on the St. Louis team, and Cochems agreed. The Chicago team won by a score of 12 to 4.

In March 1909, The New York Times reported that St. Louis University had accepted Cochems' resignation as athletic coach. One writer noted that "the circumstances of his departure from SLU are murky."

== Football career after St. Louis University ==
In 1909, Cochems worked for a time as the director of the public playground system in St. Louis. In November 1909, a Wisconsin newspaper reported that Cochems was coaching "a minor team" in St. Louis and had been beaten badly by "another equally minor institution" from Chicago. The report noted that Cochems "changed his berth for some unexplained reason this year and is doing a bump the bumps that makes a marble rolling down stairs look like a toboggan for smoothness, by comparison."

In the fall of 1910, Cochems was reportedly coaching the Barnes University football team, playing its games at Handlan's Park in St. Louis. He also coached a Missouri "all-star" team that played against Frank Longman's Notre Dame team at Sportsman's Park in St. Louis on Christmas Day 1910. Notre Dame won the game by a score of 12 to 0, and one newspaper called the game a "fiasco" and reported there was "not much that would indicate all star football" in the play of Cochems' team.

In January 1911, Cochems was considered for the position of football coach at the University of Wisconsin, but did not get the job. He moved to New York in 1911.

Cochems briefly returned to coaching in 1914 as the head football coach for the University of Maine. He led Maine to a 6–3 record in 1914.

After he left coaching, Cochems continued to be connected to the sport and interacted with its leading figures. He attended meetings of the Rules Committee with the likes of Walter Camp and John Heisman. In 1911, he proposed a "radical" change in the rules, allowing each team a single set of five downs within which to score. He also became a well-known game official. In 1921, he was the umpire for the Notre Dame – Army game played at West Point.

== Organizer and political activist ==
In the fall of 1911, Cochems moved to New York and announced that he had abandoned football for politics. Over the next 20 years, Cochems engaged in a career as an "organizer, speaker and as political campaigner." He was director of the National Speakers Bureau in 1912 during the campaign of Theodore Roosevelt, and again in 1916 during the Charles Evans Hughes campaign. He also worked in the campaigns of Calvin Coolidge and Herbert Hoover.

During World War I, he served as civilian aide to the adjutant general at Long Island.

He was a national organizer for the American Commission for Relief in Belgium. Cochems led an effort to end Prohibition as the president of the Association of American Rights—Repeal of the Eighteenth Amendment.

He also served on the staff of the Gibson Private Relief Association of New York.

== Later years ==
After living in New York for approximately 20 years, Cochems returned to Madison in the early 1930s. In 1933, he was appointed as one of three assistants to the state's NRA director and was doing speaking engagements throughout the state. In 1940, he was employed "installing a system of educational recreation in state institutions." When the position of head football coach at St. Louis University opened up in 1940, Cochems put in his name, but the job went to Dukes Duford.

== Family and death ==
Cochems married May Louise Mullen of Madison in August 1902. Their wedding trip ended at Fargo, where Cochems had been hired as athletic director. They were together until his death and had five children: daughter Elizabeth and sons John, Henry, Phillip and David, who was killed in action in Essen, Germany in the closing weeks of World War II.

Cochems died after a long illness on April 9, 1953, in the same Madison hospital in which his 14th grandchild had been born the day prior.

== Football legacy ==
=== Father of the forward pass ===
Recognition of Cochems' role in the development of the forward pass has been inconsistent.

Following the first season in which the play was legal, Walter Camp chose Cochems to write the only article on the forward pass in the 1907 edition of Spalding's How to Play Foot Ball, which Camp edited.

Some have advocated for recognition of Cochems as the "father of the forward pass." As early as 1909, a writer in The Post-Standard (Syracuse, New York) wrote: "Cochems was the first coach to grasp the possibilities of the forward pass. He is a tricky and resourceful gridiron master with a large repertoire of plays and a dynamic personality." In 1920, a syndicated story on Cochems' becoming the head of the "Order of Camels" referred to him as "the famous daddy of the forward pass."

St. Louis Post Dispatch sports columnist Ed Wray was one of the earliest advocates for Cochems' role in developing the forward pass. In a 1940 column, Wray described Cochems' 1906 offensive scheme:

He also alternated the long 'projectile pass' (that's what Cochems called it), with a short, fast pass over the line of scrimmage, five yards out from the center. Equipped with this attack, then absolutely new, Cochems' team had the football world popeyed after the first two or three games of the season. Owning a team with a powerful running attack, Cochems' eleven would pound the enemy line, draw in the defense and then amaze the opposition by shooting long forward pass for big gains. ... And yet today Rockne gets the credit for a discovery that rightfully belongs to a graying resident of Madison, Wis., now in the middle sixties, whose name is almost forgotten – Eddie Cochems.

In a November 1944 article in Esquire (entitled "Pioneer of the Forward Pass"), Newbery Award-winning author Harold Keith concluded that Cochems was "unquestionably the father of the forward pass."

After Cochems' death in 1953, Philip A. Dynan, then serving as the publicity director at St. Louis University, became an advocate for Cochems' claim to be the father of the forward pass. In October 1954, an Associated Press sports writer reported on Dynan's efforts on behalf of Cochems:

There are various ways used by college publicity men — 'drum beaters' in the sports writers vernacular—to get the names of their schools into the newspapers. A new twist has been developed by Phil Dynan, who handles such work for St. Louis University. Dynan, who doesn't have a football team to promote any more since his school dropped the game, nevertheless still is operating on a gridiron basis. His gimmick is a claim, 'based on considerable research,' that St. Louis was the first team to throw a forward pass.

Dynan unsuccessfully lobbied to have Cochems inducted into the College Football Hall of Fame in the 1960s, and published an article on Cochems in 1967 titled "Father of the Forward Pass."

In his book The Anatomy of a Game: Football, the Rules, and the Men Who Made the Game, Coach Nelson, the secretary-editor of the NCAA Football Rules Committee starting in 1962, stated that "E. B. Cochems is to forward passing what the Wright brothers are to aviation and Thomas Edison is to the electric light."

In 2009, SI.com and Sports Illustrated Kids listed Cochems' development of the forward pass as the first of 13 "Revolutionary Moments in Sports."

=== Contrary views ===
A contrary view was taken by football coaching legend Amos Alonzo Stagg. In Allison Danzig's book, "The History of American Football," Stagg said: "I have seen statements giving credit to certain people originating the forward pass. The fact is that all coaches were working on it. The first season, 1906, I personally had sixty-four different forward pass patterns." In 1954, Stagg told a reporter, "Eddie Cochems, who coached at St. Louis University in 1906, also claimed to have invented the pass as we know it today ... It isn't so, because after the forward pass was legalized in 1906, most of the schools commenced experimenting with it and nearly all used it." Stagg asserted that, as far back as 1894, before the rules committee even considered the forward pass, one of his players used to throw the ball "like a baseball pitcher."

After reviewing a letter from Stagg in 1948 asserting that "Eddie Cochems was not the originator of the long spiral pass," Deke Houlgate, author of "The Football Thesaurus", retracted a credit previously given to Cochems in his book:

Coach Stagg has my thorough-going agreement that Coach Cochems may not have been the first to perfect the long spiral pass because very few mentors have done so since the year 1905. It may be that Cochems merely enjoyed the benefits of a good publicity agent a generation before the word 'flack' was coined.

The only known expert witness to the passing offenses of both Stagg's and Cochems' 1906 squads was Lt. Hackett, who officiated games involving both teams. His verdict, as contemporaneously reported by Wray, was that St. Louis' passing game was different and superior to anything else he had seen that season.

Cochems' own star, Bradbury Robinson, also disputed Cochems' claim to be the developer of the forward pass. In a 1940 letter to Ed Wray, Robinson wrote :

The story of the beginning and development of the forward pass does not reside with Eddie Cochems but with myself. Strange as it may seem I began the development of the forward pass in [1904] at Wisconsin university before I ever came to St. Louis. I anticipated that it would be introduced into the rules because of the efforts Theodore Roosevelt as president was making to tone down the game and make it more spectacular. ... Mr. Cochems' connection with this development only occurred in 1906, in Wisconsin, where the St. Louis university squad had gone for early training.

In a 2006 feature story on the 100th anniversary of the forward pass, St. Louis Post-Dispatch writer Vahe Gregorian staked out a middle ground, noting, "While Cochems was the first to harness the potential of the newly legalized pass, he hardly was its architect or inventor."

=== Impact of the Rockne legend ===
Despite Cochems' contribution to football, his story was long the stuff of trivia. Years passed and a generation of first-hand observers died. They were replaced by generations influenced by the popular 1940 film Knute Rockne, All American in which Notre Dame's Knute Rockne was portrayed as the originator of the forward pass.

Another factor that may have contributed to Cochems' story fading from the public's memory was the decision of St. Louis University to discontinue intercollegiate football in 1949.

The New York Times columnist Arthur Daley, the first sportswriter to win the Pulitzer Prize, wrote in 1949 that Rockne and Gus Dorais, "caught a much larger share of immortality than they actually deserve, including credit for inventing the forward pass. That, of course, belongs to Eddie Cochems of St. Louis."

In 1952, Dorais himself tried to set the record straight (as Rockne had more than 20 years earlier), telling the United Press that "Eddie Cochems of the St. Louis University team of 1906-07-08 deserves the full credit."

Tampa Bay newspaper columnist Bob Driver wrote in 2006, "Cochems' name is mostly a footnote in football history, despite his achievements as the forward-pass pioneer." Driver concluded his column writing, "So there you have it, sports fans – a quickie history of the forward pass. Feel free to clip this column and keep it with you. It could help you win a bet, next time you encounter a sports know-it-all who believes the Knute Rockne movie version."

=== Honors and recognition ===
Honors and recognition of Cochems' accomplishments have been slow coming. Cochems was twice nominated to the College Football Hall of Fame, the last time in 1965, but was not elected. Neither was Robinson. In 1967, former St. Louis University publicity director Philip Dynan wrote in his article, "Father of the Forward Pass", that "it's about time that somebody voted Edward B. Cochems into the Football Hall of Fame." But it never happened. Nor has he been inducted into the Missouri Sports Hall of Fame.

Even at St. Louis University, Cochems was not inducted into the St. Louis Billiken Hall of Fame until 1994, 18 years after it was established in 1976. He was inducted into the University of Wisconsin Athletics Hall of Fame in 1994 and the Madison Sports Hall of Fame in 1968.

In December 1999, Cochems was ranked 29th in Sports Illustrated's list of the 50 greatest sports figures in Wisconsin history.

Since 1994, the St. Louis-Tom Lombardo Chapter of the National Football Foundation has recognized "Outstanding Contribution to Amateur Football" with the Eddie Cochems Award.

In 2010, Complex magazine ranked Cochems' 1906 St. Louis squad 38th among "The 50 Most Badass College Football Teams" in history. Complex said it chose the teams based on "style, guts, amazing plays, and players and coaches that did things that just hadn't been done before."

In 2011, Amy Lamare, writing on Bleacher Report, named St. Louis' 1906 game at Carroll College one of "The 50 Most Historically Significant Games in College Football."

== Head coaching record ==
=== Football ===
Year	Team	Overall	Conference	Standing	Bowl/playoffs
North Dakota Agricultural Aggies (Independent) (1902–1903)
1902	North Dakota Agricultural	4–0			
1903	North Dakota Agricultural	5–1			
North Dakota Agricultural:		9–1			
Clemson Tigers (Independent) (1905)
1905	Clemson	3–2–1			
Clemson:		3–2–1			
Saint Louis Blue and White (Independent) (1906–1908)
1906	Saint Louis	11–0			
1907	Saint Louis	7–3			
1908	Saint Louis	6–2–2			
Saint Louis:		24–5–2			
Maine Black Bears (Maine Intercollegiate Athletic Association) (1914)
1914	Maine	6–3	2–1		
Maine:		6–3	2–1		
Total:		42–11–2			

== See also ==
- History of American football
