= 1899 Ole Miss Rebels football team =

American college football season

1899 Ole Miss Rebels football
- Conference: Southern Intercollegiate Athletic Association
- Record: 3–4 (3–4 SIAA)
- Head coach: W. H. Lyon (1st season)

1899 Southern Intercollegiate Athletic Association football standings
	Conf.					Overall
Team	W		L		T	W		L		T
Sewanee $	11	–	0	–	0	12	–	0	–	0
Vanderbilt	5	–	0	–	0	7	–	2	–	0
Alabama	1	–	0	–	0	3	–	1	–	0
Nashville	4	–	1	–	0	4	–	1	–	1
Tennessee	2	–	1	–	0	6	–	2	–	0
Auburn	2	–	1	–	1	3	–	1	–	1
Texas	3	–	2	–	0	6	–	2	–	0
North Carolina	1	–	1	–	0	7	–	3	–	0
Ole Miss	3	–	4	–	0	3	–	4	–	0
Georgia	2	–	3	–	1	2	–	3	–	1
Clemson	1	–	2	–	0	4	–	2	–	0
Central (KY)	1	–	2	–	0	1	–	2	–	0
LSU	1	–	3	–	0	1	–	4	–	0
Kentucky State	0	–	1	–	0	5	–	2	–	2
SW Presbyterian	0	–	1	–	0	1	–	1	–	0
Cumberland (TN)	0	–	3	–	0	0	–	3	–	0
Georgia Tech	0	–	5	–	0	0	–	6	–	0
Tulane	0	–	5	–	0	0	–	6	–	1
$ – Conference champion

The 1899 Ole Miss Rebels football team represented the University of Mississippi during the 1899 Southern Intercollegiate Athletic Association football season. Led by W. H. Lyon in his first and only season as head coach, Ole Miss compiled an overall record of 3–4. The season closed with a defeat of Tulane.

== Schedule ==
Date	Time	Opponent	Site	Result	Attendance	Source
October 27	3:30 p.m.	vs. Central (KY)	Citizens' Park; Memphis, TN	W 13–6		
October 28		Nashville	Oxford, MS	L 0–11		
November 1		vs.LSU	Fair grounds; Meridian, MS (rivalry)	W 11–0	5,000	
November 4		vs. Vanderbilt	Billings Park; Memphis, TN (rivalry)	L 0–11		
November 12		vs. Sewanee	Billings Park; Memphis, TN	L 0–12		
November 24		vs. Alabama	Driving Park; Jackson, MS (rivalry)	L 5–7	600	
November 30		at Tulane	Tulane Athletic Park; New Orleans, LA (rivalry)	W 15–0		
All times are in Central time
