= 1905 Clemson Tigers football team =

American college football season

1905 Clemson Tigers football
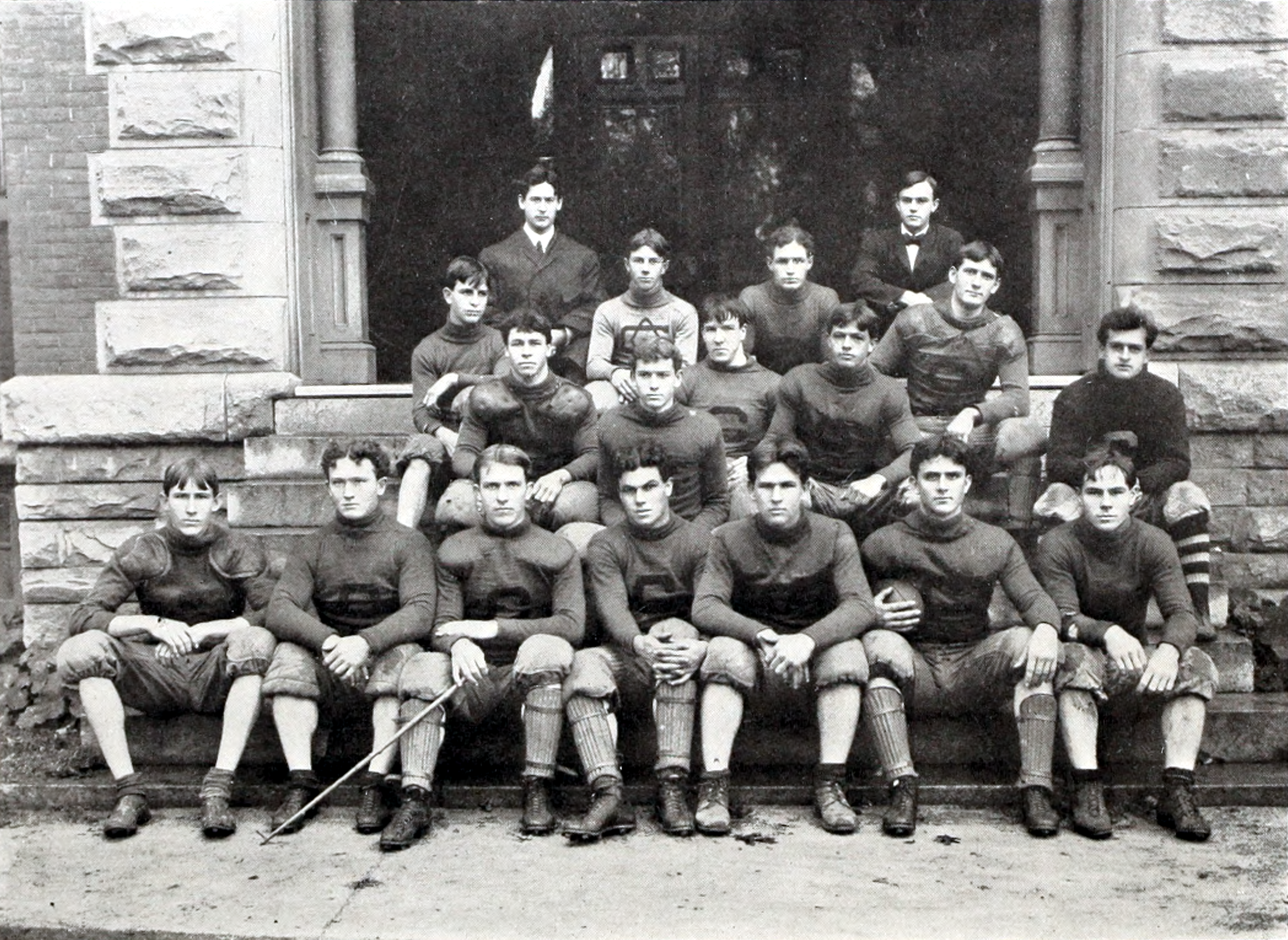
- Conference: Southern Intercollegiate Athletic Association
- Record: 3–2–1 (3–2–1 SIAA)
- Head coach: Eddie Cochems (1st season)
- Captain: Puss Derrick
- Home stadium: Bowman Field

1905 Southern Intercollegiate Athletic Association football standings
	Conf.					Overall
Team	W		L		T	W		L		T
Vanderbilt $	5	–	0	–	0	7	–	1	–	0
Georgia Tech	5	–	0	–	1	6	–	0	–	1
LSU	2	–	0	–	0	3	–	0	–	0
Sewanee	3	–	1	–	1	4	–	2	–	1
Clemson	3	–	2	–	1	3	–	2	–	1
Cumberland (TN)	3	–	2	–	0	5	–	4	–	0
Alabama	4	–	4	–	0	6	–	4	–	0
Nashville	0	–	0	–	0	0	–	2	–	0
Auburn	2	–	3	–	0	2	–	4	–	0
Mississippi A&M	1	–	4	–	0	3	–	4	–	0
Tulane	0	–	1	–	0	0	–	1	–	0
Ole Miss	0	–	2	–	0	0	–	2	–	0
Tennessee	0	–	4	–	1	3	–	5	–	1
Georgia	0	–	5	–	0	1	–	5	–	0
$ – Conference champion

The 1905 Clemson Tigers football team represented Clemson Agricultural College—now known as Clemson University—during the 1905 Southern Intercollegiate Athletic Association football season. Under first year head coach Eddie Cochems, the team posted a 3–2–1 record. Puss Derrick was the team captain. John de Saulles rated Clemson as the third best team in the SIAA.

== Schedule ==
Date	Opponent	Site	Result	Source
October 14	Tennessee	Bowman Field; Clemson, SC	T 5–5	
October 21	at Georgia	Herty Field; Athens, GA (rivalry)	W 35–0	
October 25	vs. Alabama	State Fairgrounds; Columbia, SC (rivalry)	W 25–0	
November 11	at Auburn	Drill Field; Auburn, AL (rivalry)	W 26–0	
November 18	at Vanderbilt	Dudley Field; Nashville, TN	L 0–41	
November 30	at Georgia Tech	The Flats; Atlanta, GA (rivalry)	L 10–17	
