= 1905 Ole Miss Rebels football team =

American college football season

1905 Ole Miss Rebels football
- Conference: Southern Intercollegiate Athletic Association
- Record: 0–2 (0–2 SIAA)
- Head coach: None

1905 Southern Intercollegiate Athletic Association football standings
	Conf.					Overall
Team	W		L		T	W		L		T
Vanderbilt $	5	–	0	–	0	7	–	1	–	0
Georgia Tech	5	–	0	–	1	6	–	0	–	1
LSU	2	–	0	–	0	3	–	0	–	0
Sewanee	3	–	1	–	1	4	–	2	–	1
Clemson	3	–	2	–	1	3	–	2	–	1
Cumberland (TN)	3	–	2	–	0	5	–	4	–	0
Alabama	4	–	4	–	0	6	–	4	–	0
Nashville	0	–	0	–	0	0	–	2	–	0
Auburn	2	–	3	–	0	2	–	4	–	0
Mississippi A&M	1	–	4	–	0	3	–	4	–	0
Tulane	0	–	1	–	0	0	–	1	–	0
Ole Miss	0	–	2	–	0	0	–	2	–	0
Tennessee	0	–	4	–	1	3	–	5	–	1
Georgia	0	–	5	–	0	1	–	5	–	0
$ – Conference champion

The 1905 Ole Miss Rebels football team represented the University of Mississippi during the 1905 Southern Intercollegiate Athletic Association football season. The team had no coach and did not score a point, losing to Cumberland and in the Egg Bowl.

== Schedule ==
Date	Opponent	Site	Result	Source
November 20	Cumberland (TN)	University Park; Oxford, MS	L 0–18	
November 30	vs. Mississippi A&M	State Fairgrounds; Jackson, MS (rivalry)	L 0–11	
