= 1905 Tennessee Volunteers football team =

American college football season

1905 Tennessee Volunteers football
- Conference: Southern Intercollegiate Athletic Association
- Record: 3–5–1 (0–4–1 SIAA)
- Head coach: James DePree (1st season)
- Captain: Roscoe Word
- Home stadium: Baldwin Park

1905 Southern Intercollegiate Athletic Association football standings
	Conf.					Overall
Team	W		L		T	W		L		T
Vanderbilt $	5	–	0	–	0	7	–	1	–	0
Georgia Tech	5	–	0	–	1	6	–	0	–	1
LSU	2	–	0	–	0	3	–	0	–	0
Sewanee	3	–	1	–	1	4	–	2	–	1
Clemson	3	–	2	–	1	3	–	2	–	1
Cumberland (TN)	3	–	2	–	0	5	–	4	–	0
Alabama	4	–	4	–	0	6	–	4	–	0
Nashville	0	–	0	–	0	0	–	2	–	0
Auburn	2	–	3	–	0	2	–	4	–	0
Mississippi A&M	1	–	4	–	0	3	–	4	–	0
Tulane	0	–	1	–	0	0	–	1	–	0
Ole Miss	0	–	2	–	0	0	–	2	–	0
Tennessee	0	–	4	–	1	3	–	5	–	1
Georgia	0	–	5	–	0	1	–	5	–	0
$ – Conference champion

The 1905 Tennessee Volunteers football team represented the University of Tennessee in the 1905 Southern Intercollegiate Athletic Association football season. James DePree, a University of Michigan grad, served the first of his two seasons as head coach at Tennessee. This was the Volunteers' first season without a win in Southern Intercollegiate Athletic Association play since 1897.

== Schedule ==
Date	Opponent	Site	Result	Source
September 30	Tennessee School for the Deaf*	Baldwin Park; Knoxville, TN	W 16–6	
October 7	American Temperance*	Baldwin Park; Knoxville, TN	W 104–0	
October 14	at Clemson	Bowman Field; Clemson, SC	T 5–5	
October 21	Vanderbilt	Baldwin Park; Knoxville, TN (rivalry)	L 0–45	
October 28	at Sewanee	Hardee Field; Sewanee, TN	L 6–11	
November 4	at Georgia Tech	The Flats; Atlanta, GA (rivalry)	L 0–45	
November 18	Central University*	Baldwin Park; Knoxville, TN	W 31–5	
November 30	at Alabama	Birmingham Fairgrounds; Birmingham, AL (rivalry)	L 0–29	
December 2	at Grant*	Olympic Park Field; Chattanooga, TN	L 0–5	
*Non-conference game
