= 1905 Tulane Olive and Blue football team =

American college football season

1905 Tulane Olive and Blue football
- Conference: Southern Intercollegiate Athletic Association
- Record: 0–1 (0–1 SIAA)
- Head coach: John F. Tobin (1st season)
- Captain: John Chambers
- Home stadium: Athletic Park

1905 Southern Intercollegiate Athletic Association football standings
| | Conf. | | | | | Overall |
| Team | W | | L | | T | W | | L | | T |
|---|---|---|---|---|---|---|---|---|---|---|
| Vanderbilt $ | 5 | – | 0 | – | 0 | 7 | – | 1 | – | 0 |
| Georgia Tech | 5 | – | 0 | – | 1 | 6 | – | 0 | – | 1 |
| LSU | 2 | – | 0 | – | 0 | 3 | – | 0 | – | 0 |
| Sewanee | 3 | – | 1 | – | 1 | 4 | – | 2 | – | 1 |
| Clemson | 3 | – | 2 | – | 1 | 3 | – | 2 | – | 1 |
| Cumberland (TN) | 3 | – | 2 | – | 0 | 5 | – | 4 | – | 0 |
| Alabama | 4 | – | 4 | – | 0 | 6 | – | 4 | – | 0 |
| Nashville | 0 | – | 0 | – | 0 | 0 | – | 2 | – | 0 |
| Auburn | 2 | – | 3 | – | 0 | 2 | – | 4 | – | 0 |
| Mississippi A&M | 1 | – | 4 | – | 0 | 3 | – | 4 | – | 0 |
| Tulane | 0 | – | 1 | – | 0 | 0 | – | 1 | – | 0 |
| Ole Miss | 0 | – | 2 | – | 0 | 0 | – | 2 | – | 0 |
| Tennessee | 0 | – | 4 | – | 1 | 3 | – | 5 | – | 1 |
| Georgia | 0 | – | 5 | – | 0 | 1 | – | 5 | – | 0 |
$ – Conference champion

The 1905 Tulane Olive and Blue football team represented Tulane University during the 1905 Southern Intercollegiate Athletic Association football season.

== Schedule ==
| Date | Opponent | Site | Result | Source |
|---|---|---|---|---|
| November 25 | LSU | Athletic Park; New Orleans, LA (Battle for the Rag) | L 0–5 | |
