= 1905 Cumberland Bulldogs football team =

American college football season

1905 Cumberland Bulldogs football
- Conference: Southern Intercollegiate Athletic Association
- Record: 5–4 (3–2 SIAA)
- Head coach: John Counselman (1st season)
- Captain: E. L. Minton

1905 Southern Intercollegiate Athletic Association football standings
	Conf.					Overall
Team	W		L		T	W		L		T
Vanderbilt $	5	–	0	–	0	7	–	1	–	0
Georgia Tech	5	–	0	–	1	6	–	0	–	1
LSU	2	–	0	–	0	3	–	0	–	0
Sewanee	3	–	1	–	1	4	–	2	–	1
Clemson	3	–	2	–	1	3	–	2	–	1
Cumberland (TN)	3	–	2	–	0	5	–	4	–	0
Alabama	4	–	4	–	0	6	–	4	–	0
Nashville	0	–	0	–	0	0	–	2	–	0
Auburn	2	–	3	–	0	2	–	4	–	0
Mississippi A&M	1	–	4	–	0	3	–	4	–	0
Tulane	0	–	1	–	0	0	–	1	–	0
Ole Miss	0	–	2	–	0	0	–	2	–	0
Tennessee	0	–	4	–	1	3	–	5	–	1
Georgia	0	–	5	–	0	1	–	5	–	0
$ – Conference champion

The 1905 Cumberland Bulldogs football team represented Cumberland University in the 1905 Southern Intercollegiate Athletic Association football season. Led by John Counselman in his first and only season as head coach, Cumberland compiled an overall record of 5–4 with a mark of 3–2 in SIAA play.

== Schedule ==
Date	Opponent	Site	Result	Attendance	Source
October 6	at VPI*	Gibboney Field; Blacksburg, VA	L 0–12		
October 9	at Maryville (TN)*	Maryville, TN	W 38–0	300	
October 21	vs. Sewanee	Nashville, TN	L 0–9		
October 28	at Georgia Tech	The Flats; Atlanta, GA	L 0–18		
October 30	at Georgia	Herty Field; Athens, GA	W 39–0		
October 31	at Grant*	Olympic Park Field; Chattanooga, TN	W 11–6		
November 11	at Kentucky State College*	Lexington, KY	L 0–6		
November 18	at Mississippi A&M	Hardy Field; Starkville, MS	W 27–5		
November 20	at Ole Miss	University Park; Oxford, MS	W 18–0		
*Non-conference game
