= Willard Hyatt =

American athlete and football coach (1883–1967)

Biographical details
- Born: June 15, 1883; Meriden, Connecticut, U.S.
- Died: April 10, 1967 (aged 83); Meriden, Connecticut, U.S.

Playing career

Football
- 1903–1904: Yale

Basketball
- 1902–1905: Yale
- Position: Center (basketball)

Coaching career (HC unless noted)

Football
- 1905: Sewanee

Head coaching record
- Overall: 4–2–1

Accomplishments and honors

Awards
- Basketball; Consensus All-American (1905)

Willard Curtis Hyatt (June 15, 1883 – April 10, 1967) was an American college football player and coach and college basketball player. An All-American basketball player at Yale University in 1904–05, he was part of the first group of college basketball players to be honored as such, and it occurred during his senior year. The Helms Athletic Foundation, which began in 1936, retroactively named the All-American teams from 1905 to 1935. Between 1905 and 1929, the Helms All-American teams are considered to be consensus selections. Following is graduation from Yale in June 1905, Hyatt served as the head football coach at Sewanee: The University of the South for one season, in the fall of 1905, compiling a record of 4–2–1.

Hyatt was born on June 15, 1883, in Meriden, Connecticut, to Isaac Beach and Jennie Bishop Hyatt. In 1908, he joined the firm of Little, Somers, & Hyatt Co., dealers of home decorations and artist supplies, later serving as president until his retirement around 1957. He died on April 10, 1967, at Meriden Hospital in Meriden, following a short illness.

== Head coaching record ==
Year	Team	Overall	Conference	Standing	Bowl/playoffs
Sewanee Tigers (Southern Intercollegiate Athletic Association) (1905)
1905	Sewanee	4–2–1	3–2–1	5th	
Sewanee:		4–2–1	3–2–1		
Total:		4–2–1			
