= 1905 Sewanee Tigers football team =

American college football season

1905 Sewanee Tigers football
- Conference: Southern Intercollegiate Athletic Association
- Record: 4–2–1 (3–2–1 SIAA)
- Head coach: Willard Hyatt (1st season)
- Captain: John Scarbrough
- Home stadium: Hardee Field

1905 Southern Intercollegiate Athletic Association football standings
	Conf.					Overall
Team	W		L		T	W		L		T
Vanderbilt $	5	–	0	–	0	7	–	1	–	0
Georgia Tech	5	–	0	–	1	6	–	0	–	1
LSU	2	–	0	–	0	3	–	0	–	0
Sewanee	3	–	1	–	1	4	–	2	–	1
Clemson	3	–	2	–	1	3	–	2	–	1
Cumberland (TN)	3	–	2	–	0	5	–	4	–	0
Alabama	4	–	4	–	0	6	–	4	–	0
Nashville	0	–	0	–	0	0	–	2	–	0
Auburn	2	–	3	–	0	2	–	4	–	0
Mississippi A&M	1	–	4	–	0	3	–	4	–	0
Tulane	0	–	1	–	0	0	–	1	–	0
Ole Miss	0	–	2	–	0	0	–	2	–	0
Tennessee	0	–	4	–	1	3	–	5	–	1
Georgia	0	–	5	–	0	1	–	5	–	0
$ – Conference champion

The 1905 Sewanee Tigers football team represented Sewanee: The University of the South as a member of the Southern Intercollegiate Athletic Association (SIAA) during the 1905 college football season. Led by first-year head coach Willard Hyatt, the Tigers compiled an overall record of 4–2–1, with a mark of 3–2–1 in conference play.

== Schedule ==
Date	Opponent	Site	Result	Source
October 7	Mooney*	Hardee Field; Sewanee, TN	W 42–0	
October 20	vs. Cumberland (TN)	Nashville, TN	W 9–0	
October 28	Tennessee	Hardee Field; Sewanee, TN	W 11–6	
November 11	at Georgia Tech	The Flats; Atlanta, GA	T 18–18	
November 17	at Texas*	Clark Field; Austin, TX	L 10–17	
November 23	at Alabama	Birmingham Fairgrounds; Birmingham, AL	W 42–6	
November 30	at Vanderbilt	Dudley Field; Nashville, TN (rivalry)	L 4–68	
*Non-conference game

== Players ==
=== Varsity lettermen ===
==== Line ====
Player	Position	Games started	Hometown	Prep school	Height	Weight	Age
J. L. Brong	guard						
Rupert Colmore	end		Sewanee, Tennessee			155	
E. H. Fowlkes	tackle						
Ephraim Kirby-Smith	tackle		Sewanee, Tennessee			156	
Henry D. Phillips	guard		Philadelphia		6'4"	188	23
Miles Watkins	center						
David Wettlin	end						

==== Backfield ====
Player	Position	Games started	Hometown	Prep school	Height	Weight	Age
John Scarbrough	quarterback		Rockdale, Texas			135	19
James L. Harris	back						
John Shaffer	back						
Wilmer Poyner	back						
Nate Sawrie	back						

==== Subs ====
Player	Position	Games started	Hometown	Prep school	Height	Weight	Age
R. N. Atkinson
Robert Bostrom
Roland Crownover
John Greer
H. H. Lumpkin
