= 1905 Georgia Tech Yellow Jackets football team =

American college football season

1905 Georgia Tech Yellow Jackets football
- Conference: Southern Intercollegiate Athletic Association
- Record: 6–0–1 (5–0–1 SIAA)
- Head coach: John Heisman (2nd season)
- Captain: Louis Clark
- Home stadium: The Flats

1905 Southern Intercollegiate Athletic Association football standings
	Conf.					Overall
Team	W		L		T	W		L		T
Vanderbilt $	5	–	0	–	0	7	–	1	–	0
Georgia Tech	5	–	0	–	1	6	–	0	–	1
LSU	2	–	0	–	0	3	–	0	–	0
Sewanee	3	–	1	–	1	4	–	2	–	1
Clemson	3	–	2	–	1	3	–	2	–	1
Cumberland (TN)	3	–	2	–	0	5	–	4	–	0
Alabama	4	–	4	–	0	6	–	4	–	0
Nashville	0	–	0	–	0	0	–	2	–	0
Auburn	2	–	3	–	0	2	–	4	–	0
Mississippi A&M	1	–	4	–	0	3	–	4	–	0
Tulane	0	–	1	–	0	0	–	1	–	0
Ole Miss	0	–	2	–	0	0	–	2	–	0
Tennessee	0	–	4	–	1	3	–	5	–	1
Georgia	0	–	5	–	0	1	–	5	–	0
$ – Conference champion

The 1905 Georgia Tech Yellow Jackets football team represented the Georgia Institute of Technology during the 1905 Southern Intercollegiate Athletic Association football season. This is the second year for Georgia Tech under coach John Heisman.

== Schedule ==
Date	Opponent	Site	Result	Source
October 7	North Georgia*	The Flats; Atlanta, GA	W 54–0	
October 21	Alabama	The Flats; Atlanta, GA (rivalry)	W 12–5	
October 28	Cumberland (TN)	The Flats; Atlanta, GA	W 18–0	
November 4	Tennessee	The Flats; Atlanta, GA (rivalry)	W 45–0	
November 11	Sewanee	The Flats; Atlanta, GA	T 18–18	
November 18	Georgia	The Flats; Atlanta, GA (rivalry)	W 46–0	
November 30	Clemson	The Flats; Atlanta, GA (rivalry)	W 17–10	
*Non-conference game
