= 1905 Mississippi A&M Aggies football team =

American college football season

1905 Mississippi A&M Aggies football
- Conference: Southern Intercollegiate Athletic Association
- Record: 3–4 (1–4 SIAA)
- Head coach: Daniel S. Martin (3rd season)
- Home stadium: Hardy Field

1905 Southern Intercollegiate Athletic Association football standings
	Conf.					Overall
Team	W		L		T	W		L		T
Vanderbilt $	5	–	0	–	0	7	–	1	–	0
Georgia Tech	5	–	0	–	1	6	–	0	–	1
LSU	2	–	0	–	0	3	–	0	–	0
Sewanee	3	–	1	–	1	4	–	2	–	1
Clemson	3	–	2	–	1	3	–	2	–	1
Cumberland (TN)	3	–	2	–	0	5	–	4	–	0
Alabama	4	–	4	–	0	6	–	4	–	0
Nashville	0	–	0	–	0	0	–	2	–	0
Auburn	2	–	3	–	0	2	–	4	–	0
Mississippi A&M	1	–	4	–	0	3	–	4	–	0
Tulane	0	–	1	–	0	0	–	1	–	0
Ole Miss	0	–	2	–	0	0	–	2	–	0
Tennessee	0	–	4	–	1	3	–	5	–	1
Georgia	0	–	5	–	0	1	–	5	–	0
$ – Conference champion

The 1905 Mississippi A&M Aggies football team represented The Agricultural and Mechanical College of the State of Mississippi (now known as Mississippi State University) as a member of the Southern Intercollegiate Athletic Association (SIAA) during the 1905 college football season. Led by third-year head coach Daniel S. Martin, the Aggies compiled an overall record of 3–4 with a mark of 1–4 in conference play.

== Schedule ==
Date	Opponent	Site	Result	Source
October 14	at Alabama	The Quad; Tuscaloosa, AL (rivalry)	L 0–34	
October 20	at Marion*	Marion, AL	W 38–0	
October 27	Auburn	Columbus Fairgrounds; Columbus, MS	L 0–18	
November 11	Howard (AL)*	Hardy Field; Starkville, MS	W 44–0	
November 18	Cumberland (TN)	Hardy Field; Starkville, MS	L 5–27	
November 30	vs. Ole Miss	State Fairgrounds; Jackson, MS (rivalry)	W 11–0	
December 2	at LSU	State Field; Baton Rouge, LA	L 0–15	
*Non-conference game
