= W. H. Lyon =

American football coach (1872–1957)

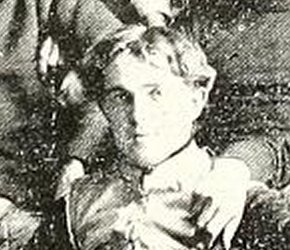
- Lyon pictured in Cream and Crimson 1896, Central yearbook

Biographical details
- Born: September 15, 1872; Boonton, New Jersey, U.S.
- Died: April 3, 1957 (aged 84); Stamford, Connecticut, U.S.
- Education: Central University (1896); Yale University

Coaching career (HC unless noted)
- 1899: Ole Miss

Head coaching record
- Overall: 3–4

William Hillyer Lyon (September 15, 1872 – April 3, 1957) was an American football coach. He served as the head football coach at the University of Mississippi (Ole Miss) in 1899. During his one-season tenure at Ole Miss, Lyon compiled an overall record of three wins and four losses (3–4). Lyon was born in 1872 in Boonton, New Jersey. He was a member of the Phi Delta Theta fraternity.

In 1906, Lyon was working for a lumber company in Bridgeport, Connecticut as a travelling salesman. By the time of World War I, Lyon living in Bridgeport working as an accountant for the United States Government.

He died in Stamford in 1957.

== Head coaching record ==
Year	Team	Overall	Conference	Standing	Bowl/playoffs
Ole Miss Rebels (Southern Intercollegiate Athletic Association) (1899)
1899	Ole Miss	3–4	2–3		
Ole Miss:		3–4	2–3		
Total:		3–4			
