= C. E. Woodruff =

American reverend, educator, sports coach (died 1933)

Biographical details
- Born: Lima, Indiana, U.S.
- Died: February 23, 1933; Haddon Heights, New Jersey, U.S.

Coaching career (HC unless noted)

Football
- 1896: Alma
- 1899: Nashville
- 1900: Iowa State

Baseball
- 1901: Iowa State

Head coaching record
- Overall: 8–6–3 (football); 4–4 (baseball)

Charles Elmer Woodruff (died February 23, 1933) was an American reverend, educator, and college football and college baseball coach. He served as the head football coach at Alma College in 1896, the University of Nashville in 1899, and Iowa State College of Agriculture and Mechanic Arts—now known as Iowa State University—in 1900. Woodruff was also the head baseball coach at Iowa State in 1901.

== Early life and education ==
Woodruff was born in Lima, Indiana. He graduated from the University of Pennsylvania with a Bachelor of Arts in 1886, and was later a divinity student at the University of Chicago. Woodruff also graduated from the Crozer Theological Seminary in Chester, Pennsylvania, and was an ordained Baptist minister.

== Coaching career ==
=== Alma ===
Woodruff was the head football coach at Alma College in Alma, Michigan for one season, in 1896, compiling a record of 2–0–1.

=== Nashville ===
In 1899, he served as the head football coach at the University of Nashville.

=== Iowa State ===
In 1900, Iowa State College hired Woodruff as a "director of physical culture and instructor in Latin." Woodruff served as the fifth head coach for the Iowa State football team during the 1900 season. His coaching record at Iowa state was 2–5–1.

== Late life and death ==
Woodruff taught at the Howe School, in his home town of Lima, Indiana, and then at the Trinity School in Manhattan before retiring due to ill health in the 1920s. He died on February 23, 1933, as his home in Haddon Heights, New Jersey. He was survived by his wife, Alice R. Varney, of Camden, New Jersey.

== Head coaching record ==
=== Football ===
Year	Team	Overall	Conference	Standing	Bowl/playoffs
Alma Maroon and Cream (Independent) (1896)
1896	Alma	2–0–1			
Alma:		2–0–1			
Nashville Garnet and Blue (Southern Intercollegiate Athletic Association) (1899)
1899	Nashville	4–1–1	4–1	4th	
Nashville:		4–1–1	4–1		
Iowa State Cyclones (Independent) (1900)
1900	Iowa State	2–5–1			
Iowa State:		2–5–1			
Total:		8–6–3			
