= 1899 Nashville Garnet and Blue football team =

American college football season

1899 Nashville Garnet and Blue football
- Conference: Southern Intercollegiate Athletic Association
- Record: 4–1–1 (4–1 SIAA)
- Head coach: C. E. Woodruff (1st season)
- Home stadium: Normal College Field

1899 Southern Intercollegiate Athletic Association football standings
	Conf.					Overall
Team	W		L		T	W		L		T
Sewanee $	11	–	0	–	0	12	–	0	–	0
Vanderbilt	5	–	0	–	0	7	–	2	–	0
Alabama	1	–	0	–	0	3	–	1	–	0
Nashville	4	–	1	–	0	4	–	1	–	1
Tennessee	2	–	1	–	0	6	–	2	–	0
Auburn	2	–	1	–	1	3	–	1	–	1
Texas	3	–	2	–	0	6	–	2	–	0
North Carolina	1	–	1	–	0	7	–	3	–	0
Ole Miss	3	–	4	–	0	3	–	4	–	0
Georgia	2	–	3	–	1	2	–	3	–	1
Clemson	1	–	2	–	0	4	–	2	–	0
Central (KY)	1	–	2	–	0	1	–	2	–	0
LSU	1	–	3	–	0	1	–	4	–	0
Kentucky State	0	–	1	–	0	5	–	2	–	2
SW Presbyterian	0	–	1	–	0	1	–	1	–	0
Cumberland (TN)	0	–	3	–	0	0	–	3	–	0
Georgia Tech	0	–	5	–	0	0	–	6	–	0
Tulane	0	–	5	–	0	0	–	6	–	1
$ – Conference champion

The 1899 Nashville Garnet and Blue football team was an American football team that represented the University of Nashville as a member of the Southern Intercollegiate Athletic Association (SIAA) during the 1899 college football season. In their first year under head coach C. E. Woodruff, Nashville compiled an overall record of 4–1–1, with a mark of 4–1 in conference play, and finished fourth in the SIAA.

== Schedule ==
Date	Time	Opponent	Site	Result	Attendance	Source
October 14		at Cumberland (TN)	Lebanon, TN	W 18–0		
October 21		Bethel (KY)*	Normal College Field; Nashville, TN	T 5–5		
October 28		at Ole Miss	Oxford, MS	W 11–0		
November 11		at Georgia Tech	Piedmont Park; Atlanta, GA	W 15–0		
November 18		Southwestern Presbyterian	Normal College Field; Nashville, TN	W 39–0		
November 25		Sewanee	Normal College Field; Nashville, TN	Canceled		
November 30	2:30 p.m.	at Vanderbilt	Dudley Field; Nashville, TN	L 0–5	4,000	
*Non-conference game
