= John F. Tobin =

American football player and coach (1880–1954)

John Tobin
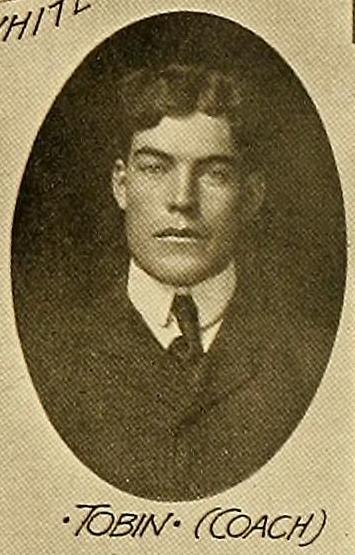
- Tobin as Tulane coach in 1905

Biographical details
- Born: January 1, 1880; Macomb, Illinois, U.S.
- Died: October 26, 1954 (aged 74); Salt Lake City, Utah, U.S.
- Education: University of Nebraska (AB, 1903); University of Chicago Law School (JD, 1906)

Playing career
- 1901–1903: Nebraska
- 1903–1904: Chicago
- Position: Guard

Coaching career (HC unless noted)
- 1905: Tulane

Head coaching record
- Overall: 0–1

John Frederick Tobin (January 1, 1880 – October 26, 1954) was an American college football player and coach. Tobin attended the University of Chicago, where he played college football under head coach Amos Alonzo Stagg. He was a "star guard" for the Maroons during the 1904 season. In 1905, he served as head coach at Tulane University alongside assistant Harry Ludlow for the 1905 season. Tulane lost its only game, 5–0, that year. Tulane accused its opponent, LSU, of using ineligible players, and the disagreement resulted in a hiatus of the series until 1911. In October, he returned to play for the Chicago team. In December 1905, he accepted the position of athletic director at Tulane. Tobin graduated from Chicago in June 1906, and passed the Illinois bar examination. He was a member of the Delta Chi fraternity. In 1906, he intended to begin practicing law after coaching at the University of Utah during the upcoming season. He later worked as a judge in Utah. Tobin died of a heart attack on October 26, 1954, in Salt Lake City, Utah.

== Head coaching record ==
| Year | Team | Overall | Conference | Standing | Bowl/playoffs |
|---|---|---|---|---|---|
Tulane Olive and Blue (Southern Intercollegiate Athletic Association) (1905)
| 1905 | Tulane | 0–1 | 0–1 | T–12th | |
| Tulane: | | 0–1 | 0–1 | | |
| Total: | | 0–1 | | | |
