= Daniel S. Martin =

American football player, coach, and administrator (1880–1949)

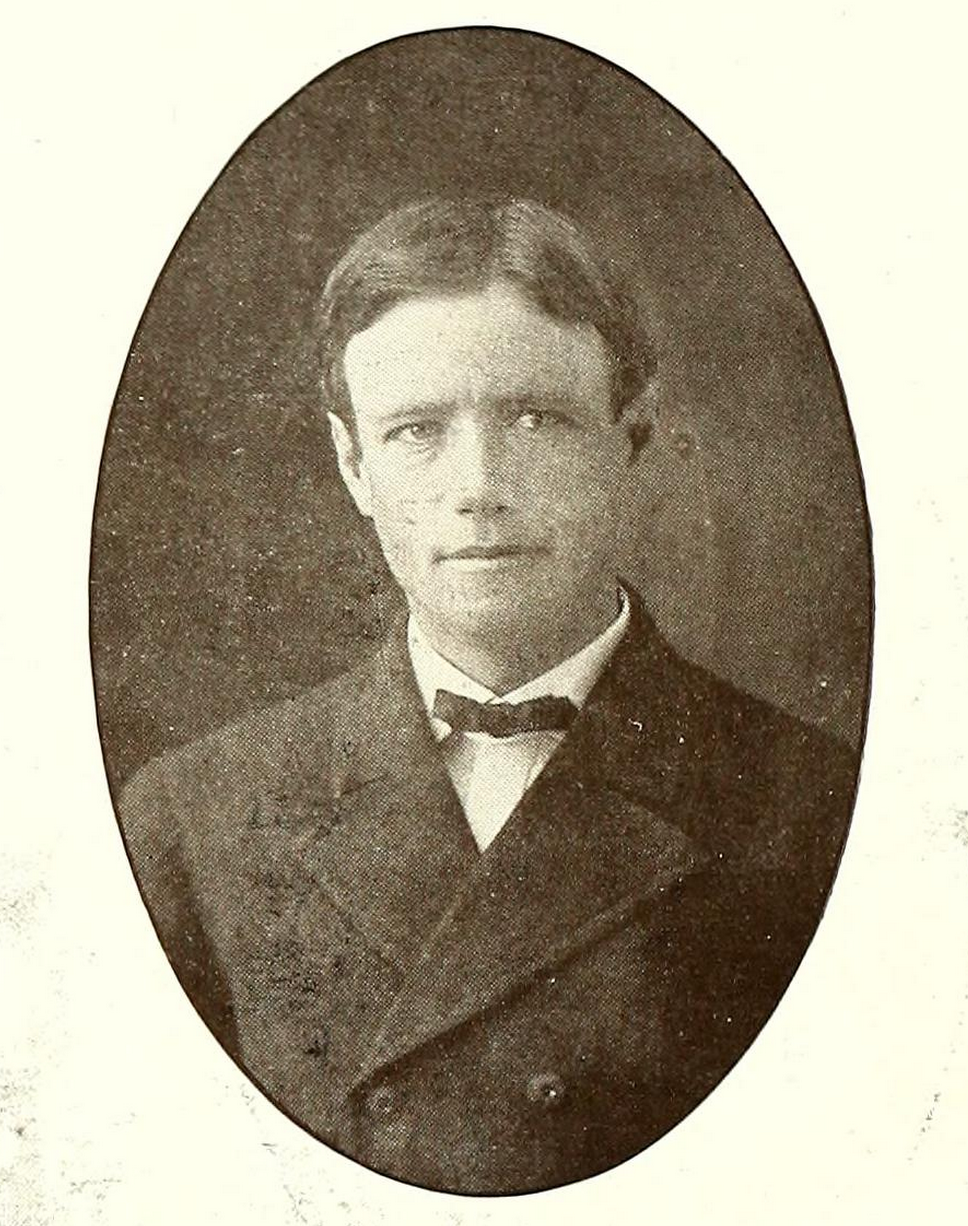
- Martin pictured in Reveille 1906, Mississippi State yearbook

Biographical details
- Born: August 31, 1880; Barbour County, Alabama, U.S.
- Died: November 5, 1949 (aged 70); Birmingham, Alabama, U.S.

Playing career
- 1898–1901: Auburn
- Position: Guard

Coaching career (HC unless noted)
- 1902: Ole Miss
- 1903–1906: Mississippi A&M

Administrative career (AD unless noted)
- 1903–1907: Mississippi A&M

Head coaching record
- Overall: 14–14–3

Daniel Stacey Martin (August 31, 1880 – November 5, 1949) was an American college football player and coach, athletics administrator, and engineer. He served as the head football coach at the University of Mississippi (Ole Miss) in 1902 and at Mississippi Agricultural & Mechanical College—now known as Mississippi State University—from the 1903 to 1906. During his one-season tenure at Mississippi, Martin compiled an overall record of four wins and three losses (4–3). During his four-season tenure at Mississippi A&M, Martin compiled an overall record of ten wins, eleven losses and three ties (10–11–3).

Stacy married Emily May MacEvoy. He later worked in the electrical and mechanical engineering industry. He was president of the McClary-Jemison Machinery Company in Birmingham, Alabama at one point. MacEvoy died in November 1949 of a heart attack. He had been in declining health since a mining accident in Mexico in 1935, which left him semi-disabled.

== Head coaching record ==
Year	Team	Overall	Conference	Standing	Bowl/playoffs
Ole Miss Rebels (Southern Intercollegiate Athletic Association) (1902)
1902	Ole Miss	4–3	3–3		
Ole Miss:		4–3	3–3		
Mississippi A&M Aggies (Southern Intercollegiate Athletic Association) (1903–1906)
1903	Mississippi A&M	3–0–2	2–0–2		
1904	Mississippi A&M	2–5	0–4		
1905	Mississippi A&M	3–4	1–3		
1906	Mississippi A&M	2–2–1	0–2–1		
Mississippi A&M:		10–11–3	3–9–3		
Total:		14–14–3			
