= Marvin M. Dickinson =

American football and baseball player

Biographical details
- Born: December 31, 1877; Savannah, Georgia, U.S.
- Died: April 20, 1951 (aged 73); LaGrange, Georgia, U.S.

Playing career

Football
- 1900–1902: Georgia

Baseball
- 1903: Georgia
- Positions: Halfback (football); Third baseman, catcher (baseball)

Coaching career (HC unless noted)

Football
- 1903, 1905: Georgia

Baseball
- 1901: Georgia
- 1904–1905: Georgia

Head coaching record
- Overall: 4–9 (football); 18–14 (baseball)

Marvin McDowell Dickinson (December 31, 1877 – April 20, 1951) was an American football and baseball player and coach. From 1900 to 1903, he played football and baseball at the University of Georgia. He served as the head coach of Georgia football team in 1903 and 1905, and the head coach of the Georgia baseball team in 1901, 1904, and 1905. Dickinson also played professional baseball in the Texas League in 1904.

== Playing career ==
Dickinson transferred to Georgia from Mercer University in 1900 and had a significant impact on baseball and football at Georgia. In football, he played halfback on the 1900, 1901 and 1902 teams. He was selected All-Southern in 1902. He was captain of the baseball team in 1902 and 1903 and played third base and catcher.

== Coaching career ==
Dickinson became the second Georgia football coach to have attended the University of Georgia when he was hired to coach the 1903 season. He was away from Athens in the fall of 1904 while playing in the Texas League, but he returned to coach Georgia football again in 1905. Dickinson was not able to achieve much success as the head coach of Georgia and only managed a 4–9 record over the course of his two years at Georgia.

Dickinson also served as the baseball coach in 1901. In 1902 and 1903, the team was coached by William Ayres Reynolds, who was also the head coach of the football team. When Reynolds left after the 1902 football season and the 1903 baseball season, Dickinson resumed his role as baseball coach for the 1904 and 1905 seasons. There is no information available on the 1901 season, but Dickinson had a coaching record of 18–14 in his last two seasons as baseball coach.

In 1910, Dickinson was hired as an assistant coach at the University School for Boys in Stone Mountain, Georgia.

== Late life ==
After he left coaching, Dickinson went into the newspaper business. He died in 1950.

== Head coaching record ==
=== Football ===
Year	Team	Overall	Conference	Standing	Bowl/playoffs
Georgia Bulldogs (Southern Intercollegiate Athletic Association) (1903)
1903	Georgia	3–4	3–2		
Georgia Bulldogs (Southern Intercollegiate Athletic Association) (1905)
1905	Georgia	1–5	0–5		
Georgia:		4–9	3–7		
Total:		4–9			

== See also ==
- List of college football head coaches with non-consecutive tenure
