= 1905 LSU Tigers football team =

American college football season

1905 LSU Tigers football
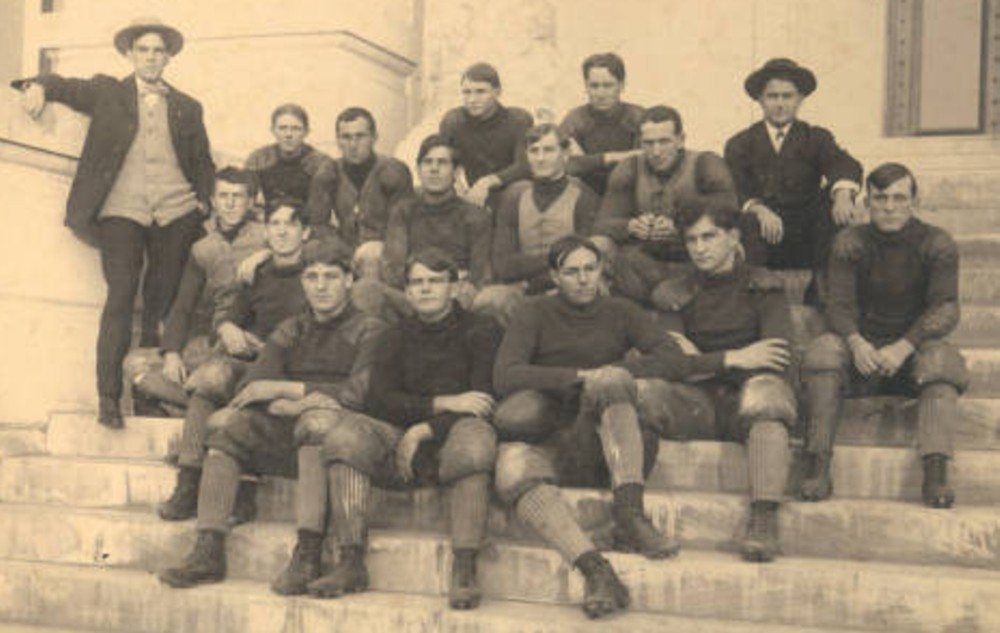
- Conference: Southern Intercollegiate Athletic Association
- Record: 3–0 (2–0 SIAA)
- Head coach: Dan A. Killian (2nd season)
- Captain: Frank M. Edwards
- Home stadium: State Field

1905 Southern Intercollegiate Athletic Association football standings
| | Conf. | | | | | Overall |
| Team | W | | L | | T | W | | L | | T |
|---|---|---|---|---|---|---|---|---|---|---|
| Vanderbilt $ | 5 | – | 0 | – | 0 | 7 | – | 1 | – | 0 |
| Georgia Tech | 5 | – | 0 | – | 1 | 6 | – | 0 | – | 1 |
| LSU | 2 | – | 0 | – | 0 | 3 | – | 0 | – | 0 |
| Sewanee | 3 | – | 1 | – | 1 | 4 | – | 2 | – | 1 |
| Clemson | 3 | – | 2 | – | 1 | 3 | – | 2 | – | 1 |
| Cumberland (TN) | 3 | – | 2 | – | 0 | 5 | – | 4 | – | 0 |
| Alabama | 4 | – | 4 | – | 0 | 6 | – | 4 | – | 0 |
| Nashville | 0 | – | 0 | – | 0 | 0 | – | 2 | – | 0 |
| Auburn | 2 | – | 3 | – | 0 | 2 | – | 4 | – | 0 |
| Mississippi A&M | 1 | – | 4 | – | 0 | 3 | – | 4 | – | 0 |
| Tulane | 0 | – | 1 | – | 0 | 0 | – | 1 | – | 0 |
| Ole Miss | 0 | – | 2 | – | 0 | 0 | – | 2 | – | 0 |
| Tennessee | 0 | – | 4 | – | 1 | 3 | – | 5 | – | 1 |
| Georgia | 0 | – | 5 | – | 0 | 1 | – | 5 | – | 0 |
$ – Conference champion

The 1905 LSU Tigers football team represented Louisiana State University (LSU) as a member of the Southern Intercollegiate Athletic Association (SIAA) during the 1905 college football season. Led by second-year head coach Dan A. Killian, the Tigers compiled an overall record of 3–0, with a mark of 2–0 in conference play.

== Schedule ==
| Date | Opponent | Site | Result | Source |
|---|---|---|---|---|
| November 18 | Louisiana Industrial* | State Field; Baton Rouge, LA | W 16–0 | |
| November 25 | at Tulane | Athletic Park; New Orleans, LA (rivalry) | W 5–0 | |
| December 1 | Mississippi A&M | State Field; Baton Rouge, LA (rivalry) | W 15–0 | |
*Non-conference game
