= 1899 Alabama Crimson White football team =

American college football season

1899 Alabama Crimson White football
- Conference: Southern Intercollegiate Athletic Association
- Record: 3–1 (1–0 SIAA)
- Head coach: W. A. Martin (1st season)
- Captain: Thomas William Wert
- Home stadium: The Quad

1899 Southern Intercollegiate Athletic Association football standings
	Conf.					Overall
Team	W		L		T	W		L		T
Sewanee $	11	–	0	–	0	12	–	0	–	0
Vanderbilt	5	–	0	–	0	7	–	2	–	0
Alabama	1	–	0	–	0	3	–	1	–	0
Nashville	4	–	1	–	0	4	–	1	–	1
Tennessee	2	–	1	–	0	6	–	2	–	0
Auburn	2	–	1	–	1	3	–	1	–	1
Texas	3	–	2	–	0	6	–	2	–	0
North Carolina	1	–	1	–	0	7	–	3	–	0
Ole Miss	3	–	4	–	0	3	–	4	–	0
Georgia	2	–	3	–	1	2	–	3	–	1
Clemson	1	–	2	–	0	4	–	2	–	0
Central (KY)	1	–	2	–	0	1	–	2	–	0
LSU	1	–	3	–	0	1	–	4	–	0
Kentucky State	0	–	1	–	0	5	–	2	–	2
SW Presbyterian	0	–	1	–	0	1	–	1	–	0
Cumberland (TN)	0	–	3	–	0	0	–	3	–	0
Georgia Tech	0	–	5	–	0	0	–	6	–	0
Tulane	0	–	5	–	0	0	–	6	–	1
$ – Conference champion

The 1899 Alabama Crimson White football team (Note: Alabama football teams were not referred to as the "Crimson Tide" until the 1907 season. Prior to 1907, the team was called the "Crimson White" from 1893 to 1906 and the "Cadets" in 1892.) (variously "Alabama", "UA" or "Bama") represented the University of Alabama in the 1899 Southern Intercollegiate Athletic Association football season. The team was led by head coach W. A. Martin, in his first season, and played their home games at The Quad in Tuscaloosa, Alabama. In what was the seventh season of Alabama football, the team finished with a record of three wins and one loss (3–1, 1–0 SIAA). In the spring of 1895, the University Board of Trustees passed a rule that prohibited athletic teams from competing off-campus for athletic events. As such the 1898 season was canceled; however the board subsequently rescinded this rule and the squad returned to the field for the 1899 season.

== Schedule ==
Date	Opponent	Site	Result	Attendance	Source
October 21	Tuscaloosa Athletic Club*	The Quad; Tuscaloosa, AL	W 16–5		
November 11	Montgomery Athletic Club*	The Quad; Tuscaloosa, AL	W 16–0		
November 24	at Ole Miss	Driving Park; Jackson, MS (rivalry)	W 7–5	600	
November 25	at New Orleans Athletic Club*	Athletic Park; New Orleans, LA	L 0–21		
*Non-conference game

(Note: For the 1899 season, point values were different from those used in contemporary games. In 1899 a touchdown was worth five points, a field goal was worth five points and an extra point (PAT) was worth one point.)

== Game summaries ==
=== Tuscaloosa Athletic Club ===
In what was the first game played since the 1897 season, Alabama defeated the Tuscaloosa Athletic Club 16–5. With a halftime score of 5–5, Alabama took the lead in the second half and won 16–5. Former Alabama player and head coach Eli Abbott played for the Tuscaloosa squad in this game.

=== Montgomery Athletic Club ===
Shirley Miller had a 75-yard touchdown run for Alabama in this 16–0 shutout victory over the Montgomery Athletic Club.

=== Ole Miss ===
In what was the first road game for Alabama since the 1895 season, the Crimsons traveled to Jackson, Mississippi and defeated Ole Miss, 7–5, at Driving Park before 600 spectators. After Alabama took a 2–0 lead following a blocked punt for a safety, Mississippi scored their only points of the game on a short touchdown run for the 5–2 lead. In the second half, Alabama scored the game-winning touchdown on an A. M. Donahoo run for the 7–5 victory.

=== New Orleans Athletic Club ===
The day after their victory over Ole Miss, Alabama traveled to New Orleans and lost, 21–0, to the New Orleans Athletic Club in the final game of the season.

== Players ==
Alabama Crimson White 1899 roster
Guards: C. A. Brown; Thomas William Wert; Tackles: C. M. Plowman; John McCorquodale	Center: J. F. Stickney; Ends: Frank H. Gamble; M. H. Hurt	Backs: Forney Johnston; John Lancaster; A. M. Donahoo; F. S. White	Substitutes: John Coleman; J. C. Granade; W. A. McCreary; B. F. McMillan; H. L. Reeder; Shirley Miller; J. R. Forman
