= W. A. Martin =

American football player and coach (1878–1955)

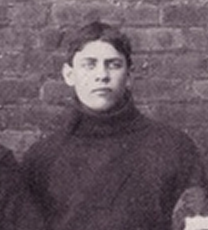
- Martin pictured playing football at Virginia

Biographical details
- Born: June 1, 1878; Chattanooga, Tennessee, U.S.
- Died: August 5, 1955 (aged 77); Chattanooga, Tennessee, U.S.

Playing career
- 1896: Virginia
- Position: Left end

Coaching career (HC unless noted)
- 1899: Alabama

Head coaching record
- Overall: 3–1

William Augustin Martin Jr. (June 1, 1878 – August 5, 1955) was an American college football player and coach. He served as the head football coach at the University of Alabama in 1899, compiling a record of 3–1.

Martin graduated from Pantops Academy in Charlottesville, Virginia. He then attended the University of Virginia, where he played football and baseball. During World War I, Martin served as a first lieutenant with the 81st Infantry Division of the United States Army. He later worked as a realtor in his hometown of Chattanooga, Tennessee. Martin died on August 5, 1955, of a heart attack, at Memorial Hospital in Chattanooga. He had resided in Lookout Mountain, Tennessee.

== Head coaching record ==
Year	Team	Overall	Conference	Standing	Bowl/playoffs
Alabama Crimson White (Southern Intercollegiate Athletic Association) (1899)
1899	Alabama	3–1	1–0		
Alabama:		3–1	1–0		
Total:		3–1			
