= 1905 Alabama Crimson White football team =

American college football season

1905 Alabama Crimson White football
- Conference: Southern Intercollegiate Athletic Association
- Record: 6–4 (4–4 SIAA)
- Head coach: Jack Leavenworth (1st season)
- Captain: Auxford Burks
- Home stadium: The Quad; Birmingham Fairgrounds

1905 Southern Intercollegiate Athletic Association football standings
	Conf.					Overall
Team	W		L		T	W		L		T
Vanderbilt $	5	–	0	–	0	7	–	1	–	0
Georgia Tech	5	–	0	–	1	6	–	0	–	1
LSU	2	–	0	–	0	3	–	0	–	0
Sewanee	3	–	1	–	1	4	–	2	–	1
Clemson	3	–	2	–	1	3	–	2	–	1
Cumberland (TN)	3	–	2	–	0	5	–	4	–	0
Alabama	4	–	4	–	0	6	–	4	–	0
Nashville	0	–	0	–	0	0	–	2	–	0
Auburn	2	–	3	–	0	2	–	4	–	0
Mississippi A&M	1	–	4	–	0	3	–	4	–	0
Tulane	0	–	1	–	0	0	–	1	–	0
Ole Miss	0	–	2	–	0	0	–	2	–	0
Tennessee	0	–	4	–	1	3	–	5	–	1
Georgia	0	–	5	–	0	1	–	5	–	0
$ – Conference champion

The 1905 Alabama Crimson White football team (Note: Alabama football teams were not referred to as the "Crimson Tide" until the 1907 season. Prior to 1907, the team was called the "Crimson White" from 1893 to 1906 and the "Cadets" in 1892.) (variously "Alabama", "UA" or "Bama") represented the University of Alabama in the 1905 Southern Intercollegiate Athletic Association football season. It was Alabama's 13th overall and 10th season as a member of the Southern Intercollegiate Athletic Association (SIAA). The team was led by head coach Jack Leavenworth, in his first year, and played their home games at both the University of Alabama Quad in Tuscaloosa and the Birmingham Fairgrounds in Birmingham, Alabama. They finished the season with a record of six wins and four losses (6–4 overall, 4–4 in the SIAA).

== Schedule ==
Date	Opponent	Site	Result	Source
October 3	Maryville (TN)*	The Quad; Tuscaloosa, AL	W 17–0	
October 7	at Vanderbilt	Dudley Field; Nashville, TN	L 0–34	
October 14	Mississippi A&M	The Quad; Tuscaloosa, AL (rivalry)	W 34–0	
October 21	at Georgia Tech	Brisbane Park; Atlanta, GA (rivalry)	L 5–12	
October 25	vs. Clemson	South Carolina State Fairgrounds; Columbia, SC (rivalry)	L 0–25	
November 4	Georgia	Birmingham Fairgrounds; Birmingham, AL (rivalry)	W 36–0	
November 9	Central University*	The Quad; Tuscaloosa, AL	W 21–0	
November 18	Auburn	Birmingham Fairgrounds; Birmingham, AL (rivalry)	W 30–0	
November 23	Sewanee	Birmingham Fairgrounds; Birmingham, AL	L 6–42	
November 30	Tennessee	Birmingham Fairgrounds; Birmingham, AL (rivalry)	W 29–0	
*Non-conference game

== Before the season ==
For the 1905 season, point values were different from those used in contemporary games. In 1905 a touchdown was worth five points, a field goal was worth four points and a conversion (PAT) was worth one point.

The team was captained by Auxford Burks, the school's "first running back hero" who would "carry whole teams on his back."

== Game summaries ==
=== Maryville (TN) ===
Burks starred in the opening win of 17 to 0 over Maryville. A number of Alabama turnovers kept the game scoreless through halftime. T. S. Sims scored the first touchdown and Burks added a 95-yard return for a touchdown.

=== Vanderbilt ===
Alabama was no match for Vanderbilt, losing 34–0. Honus Craig was the star of the game. Quarterback Frank Kyle was severely injured, knocked unconscious and taken to the hospital.

The starting lineup was Lanier (left end), Neb (left tackle), McDaniel (left guard), Moody (center), Sims (right guard), Sartain (right tackle), Patton (right end), Smith (quarterback), Burks (left halfback), Ware (right halfback), Peavy (fullback).

=== Georgia Tech ===
"The overworked Burks, who appeared to bear the entire brunt of Alabama's offense," collapsed on the field during the second half of a 12 to 5 loss to Georgia Tech.

=== Clemson ===
Alabama lost to Clemson for the last time until the 2016 National Championship Game when Alabama lost 31-35.

=== Auburn ===
Burks scored in the 30 to 0 victory over Auburn in what was then the largest crowd ever to see a game in Birmingham (4,000).
