= 1905 Georgia Bulldogs football team =

American college football season

1905 Georgia Bulldogs football
- Conference: Southern Intercollegiate Athletic Association
- Record: 1–5 (0–5 SIAA)
- Head coach: Marvin M. Dickinson (2nd season)
- Captain: J. D. Lowndes
- Home stadium: Herty Field

1905 Southern Intercollegiate Athletic Association football standings
	Conf.					Overall
Team	W		L		T	W		L		T
Vanderbilt $	5	–	0	–	0	7	–	1	–	0
Georgia Tech	5	–	0	–	1	6	–	0	–	1
LSU	2	–	0	–	0	3	–	0	–	0
Sewanee	3	–	1	–	1	4	–	2	–	1
Clemson	3	–	2	–	1	3	–	2	–	1
Cumberland (TN)	3	–	2	–	0	5	–	4	–	0
Alabama	4	–	4	–	0	6	–	4	–	0
Nashville	0	–	0	–	0	0	–	2	–	0
Auburn	2	–	3	–	0	2	–	4	–	0
Mississippi A&M	1	–	4	–	0	3	–	4	–	0
Tulane	0	–	1	–	0	0	–	1	–	0
Ole Miss	0	–	2	–	0	0	–	2	–	0
Tennessee	0	–	4	–	1	3	–	5	–	1
Georgia	0	–	5	–	0	1	–	5	–	0
$ – Conference champion

The 1905 Georgia Bulldogs football team represented the University of Georgia during the 1905 Southern Intercollegiate Athletic Association football season. The Bulldogs completed the season with a 1–5 record for the second straight year. The season included the second straight loss to John Heisman's Georgia Tech team and the sixth straight loss to Clemson. The only win came over non-conference opponent Dahlonega. This was the Georgia Bulldogs' final season under the guidance of head coach Marvin M. Dickinson.

== Schedule ==
Date	Opponent	Site	Result	Source
October 21	Clemson	Herty Field; Athens, GA (rivalry)	L 10–35	
October 30	Cumberland (TN)	Herty Field; Athens, GA	L 0–39	
November 4	at Alabama	Birmingham Fairgrounds; Birmingham, AL (rivalry)	L 0–36	
November 11	North Georgia*	Herty Field; Athens, GA	W 16–12	
November 18	at Georgia Tech	The Flats; Atlanta, GA (rivalry)	L 0–46	
November 30	vs. Auburn	Central City Park; Macon, GA (rivalry)	L 0–29	
*Non-conference game
