= 1905 Auburn Tigers football team =

American college football season

1905 Auburn Tigers football
- Conference: Southern Intercollegiate Athletic Association
- Record: 2–4 (2–3 SIAA)
- Head coach: Mike Donahue (2nd season)
- Captain: Pete Lacey
- Home stadium: Drill Field; West End Park

1905 Southern Intercollegiate Athletic Association football standings
	Conf.					Overall
Team	W		L		T	W		L		T
Vanderbilt $	5	–	0	–	0	7	–	1	–	0
Georgia Tech	5	–	0	–	1	6	–	0	–	1
LSU	2	–	0	–	0	3	–	0	–	0
Sewanee	3	–	1	–	1	4	–	2	–	1
Clemson	3	–	2	–	1	3	–	2	–	1
Cumberland (TN)	3	–	2	–	0	5	–	4	–	0
Alabama	4	–	4	–	0	6	–	4	–	0
Nashville	0	–	0	–	0	0	–	2	–	0
Auburn	2	–	3	–	0	2	–	4	–	0
Mississippi A&M	1	–	4	–	0	3	–	4	–	0
Tulane	0	–	1	–	0	0	–	1	–	0
Ole Miss	0	–	2	–	0	0	–	2	–	0
Tennessee	0	–	4	–	1	3	–	5	–	1
Georgia	0	–	5	–	0	1	–	5	–	0
$ – Conference champion

The 1905 Auburn Tigers football team represented Alabama Polytechnic Institute (now known Auburn University) in the 1905 Southern Intercollegiate Athletic Association football season. The team was led by head coach Mike Donahue, in his second year, and played their home games at both the Drill Field in Auburn and West End Park in Birmingham, Alabama. They finished the season with a record of two wins and four losses (2–4 overall, 2–3 in the SIAA).

== Schedule ==
Date	Opponent	Site	Result	Source
October 20	Davidson	West End Park; Birmingham, AL	L 0–6	
October 27	at Mississippi A&M	Columbus Fairgrounds; Columbus, MS	W 18–0	
November 4	at Vanderbilt	Dudley Field; Nashville, TN	L 0–54	
November 11	Clemson	Drill Field; Auburn, AL	L 0–26	
November 18	vs. Alabama	Birmingham Fairgrounds; Birmingham, AL (Iron Bowl)	L 0–30	
November 30	vs. Georgia	Central City Park; Macon, GA (rivalry)	W 20–0	
