= John Counselman =

Biographical details
- Born: February 18, 1880; Cripple Creek, Virginia, U.S.
- Died: March 29, 1955 (aged 75); Gadsden, Alabama, U.S.

Playing career
- 1900–1901: VPI
- Position: Halfback

Coaching career (HC unless noted)
- 1905: Cumberland (TN)
- 1906–1908: Howard (AL)

Head coaching record
- Overall: 14–14–1

John Sanders Counselman (February 18, 1880 – March 29, 1955) was an American college football player and coach, professor of mathematics, and civil engineer. He played for Virginia Tech with Hunter Carpenter. He also attended the University of Michigan. Counselman coached Cumberland in 1905, and for Samford (then Howard) from 1906 to 1908, finishing after just the first two games of the latter season. He is the first coach in Samford history. Counselman was selected as a substitute for the Washington Post's All-Southern team.

Counselman was a professor at the College of William & Mary and Georgia Tech. He also taught in high schools in Birmingham, Alabama and Gadsden, Alabama and was the superintendent of schools for Tallahassee, Florida. Counselman died of a heart attack on March 29, 1955, at this home in Gadsden.

== Head coaching record ==
Year	Team	Overall	Conference	Standing	Bowl/playoffs
Cumberland Bulldogs (Southern Intercollegiate Athletic Association) (1905)
1905	Cumberland	5–4	3–2	T–5th	
Cumberland:		5–4	3–2		
Howard Crimson and Blue (Independent) (1906–1908)
1906	Howard	6–2–1			
1907	Howard	3–6			
1908	Howard	0–2 (Note: Counselman resigned after the first two games of the 1908 season. Winton M. Blount served as head coach for the final four games. Howard finished the season with an overall record of 2–4.)			
Howard:		9–10–1			
Total:		14–14–1			
