= Jack Leavenworth =

American football player and coach (1881–1962)

Biographical details
- Born: July 20, 1881; Wallingford, Connecticut, U.S.
- Died: August 8, 1962 (aged 81); Meriden, Connecticut, U.S.
- Education: Yale University (1905)

Playing career
- 1904: Yale
- Position: Halfback

Coaching career (HC unless noted)
- 1905: Alabama

Head coaching record
- Overall: 6–4

John Wallace Leavenworth (July 20, 1881 – August 8, 1962) was an American college football player and coach. He served as the head football coach at the University of Alabama in 1905, compiling a record of 6–4. Leavenworth played football as a halfback at Yale University. He died on August 8, 1962, at Meriden Hospital in Meriden, Connecticut.

== Head coaching record ==
Year	Team	Overall	Conference	Standing	Bowl/playoffs
Alabama Crimson White (Southern Intercollegiate Athletic Association) (1905)
1905	Alabama	6–4	4–4		
Alabama:		6–4	4–4		
Total:		6–4			
