= James DePree =

American football player and sports coach (1879–1972)

Biographical details
- Born: March 14, 1879; Holland, Michigan, U.S.
- Died: July 1, 1972 (aged 93); Sarasota, Florida, U.S.

Playing career

Football
- 1903–1904: Michigan
- Position: Fullback

Coaching career (HC unless noted)

Football
- 1905–1906: Tennessee

Baseball
- 1906: Tennessee

Head coaching record
- Overall: 4–11–3 (football); 7–8 (baseball)

Accomplishments and honors

Championships
- 2× National (1903, 1904)

James "J. D." DePree, also known as Jim DePree, (March 14, 1879 – July 1, 1972) was an American football player and coach of football and baseball. He was the fifth head coach for the University of Tennessee Volunteers football team, coaching the 1905 and 1906 seasons and compiling a record of 4–11–3. While at Tennessee, he started the school's first basketball team and coached the baseball team in 1906.

Depree married Fannie Wilson of Knoxville, Tennessee, who bore his three sons. He was born in Holland, Michigan in 1879 and died in Sarasota, Florida in 1972.

DePree was a letterman in football from the University of Michigan, where he played fullback.

== Head coaching record ==
=== Football ===
Year	Team	Overall	Conference	Standing	Bowl/playoffs
Tennessee Volunteers (Southern Intercollegiate Athletic Association) (1905–1906)
1905	Tennessee	3–5–1	0–4–1	14th	
1906	Tennessee	1–6–2	0–4–1	15th	
Tennessee:		4–11–3	0–8–2		
Total:		4–11–3			
