= 1901 VPI football team =

American college football season

1901 VPI football
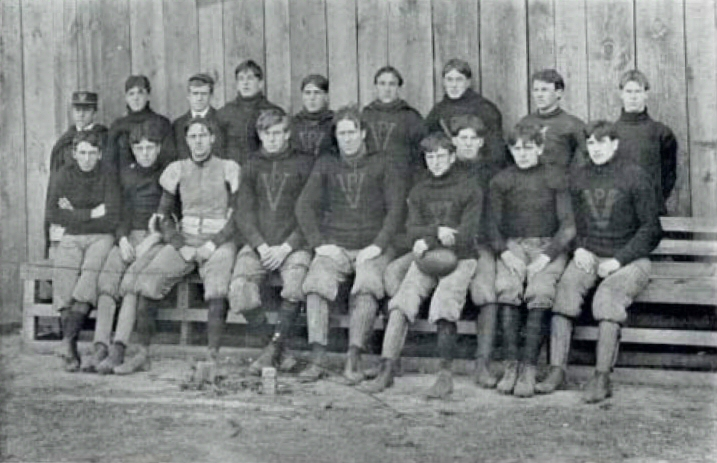
- Conference: Independent
- Record: 6–1
- Head coach: A. B. Morrison Jr. (1st season)
- Captain: Kit DeCamps
- Home stadium: Sheib Field

1901 Southern college football independents records
| | Conf. | | | Overall |
| Team | W | L | T | W | | L | | T |
|---|---|---|---|---|---|---|---|---|
| Southwestern Louisiana Industrial | | – | | 2 | – | 0 | – | 0 |
| Stetson | | – | | 1 | – | 0 | – | 0 |
| Georgia Tech | | – | | 4 | – | 0 | – | 1 |
| Marshall | | – | | 2 | – | 0 | – | 1 |
| Kentucky University | | – | | 7 | – | 1 | – | 1 |
| VPI | | – | | 6 | – | 1 | – | 0 |
| Nashville | | – | | 6 | – | 1 | – | 1 |
| Virginia | | – | | 8 | – | 2 | – | 0 |
| Texas | | – | | 8 | – | 2 | – | 1 |
| Davidson | | – | | 4 | – | 2 | – | 0 |
| Baylor | | – | | 5 | – | 3 | – | 0 |
| Gallaudet | | – | | 4 | – | 2 | – | 2 |
| Sewanee | | – | | 4 | – | 2 | – | 2 |
| William & Mary | | – | | 2 | – | 1 | – | 1 |
| Navy | | – | | 6 | – | 4 | – | 1 |
| VMI | | – | | 4 | – | 3 | – | 0 |
| Oklahoma | | – | | 3 | – | 2 | – | 0 |
| West Virginia | | – | | 3 | – | 2 | – | 0 |
| Delaware | | – | | 5 | – | 4 | – | 0 |
| Georgetown | | – | | 3 | – | 3 | – | 2 |
| Kendall | | – | | 2 | – | 2 | – | 0 |
| Spring Hill | | – | | 0 | – | 0 | – | 1 |
| Wilmington Conference Academy | | – | | 2 | – | 2 | – | 0 |
| Oklahoma A&M | | – | | 2 | – | 3 | – | 0 |
| South Carolina | | – | | 3 | – | 4 | – | 0 |
| Arkansas | | – | | 3 | – | 5 | – | 0 |
| Add-Ran | | – | | 1 | – | 2 | – | 1 |
| Furman | | – | | 1 | – | 2 | – | 1 |
| Chilocco | | – | | 2 | – | 5 | – | 0 |
| North Carolina A&M | | – | | 1 | – | 2 | – | 0 |
| Texas A&M | | – | | 1 | – | 4 | – | 0 |
| Maryland | | – | | 1 | – | 7 | – | 0 |
| Richmond | | – | | 1 | – | 7 | – | 0 |
| Florida Agricultural | | – | | 0 | – | 1 | – | 0 |
| Louisiana Industrial | | – | | 0 | – | 2 | – | 0 |
| Tusculum | | – | | | | – |

The 1901 VPI football team represented alina and Mechanical College and Polytechnic Institute in the 1901 college football season. The team was led by their head coach A. B. Morrison Jr. and finished with a record of six wins and one loss (6–1).

== Schedule ==
| Date | Time | Opponent | Site | Result | Attendance | Source |
|---|---|---|---|---|---|---|
| September 28 | | at Roanoke | Salem, VA | W 16–0 | | |
| October 11 | | Washington and Lee | Sheib Field; Blacksburg, VA | W 11–0 | | |
| October 19 | 3:30pm | at Georgetown | Georgetown Field; Washington, DC | W 32–6 | | |
| October 26 | 3:30 p.m. | Virginia | Sheib Field; Blacksburg, VA (rivalry) | L 0–16 | 1,000 | |
| October 31 | | at Clemson | Fair Grounds; Columbia, SC | W 17–11 | 5,000 | |
| November 16 | 3:00 p.m. | vs. University of Maryland, Baltimore | Broad Street Park; Richmond, VA | W 18–0 | 1,000 | |
| November 28 | 2:30 p.m. | vs. VMI | League Park; Norfolk, VA (rivalry) | W 21–0 | 5,000 | |

=== Original schedule ===
The 1901 football schedule for VPI listed in the September 22 edition of The Richmond Dispatch was as follows:

- September 28 – St. Albans in Blacksburg, Virginia (game was not played)
- October 5 – St. Albans in Radford, Virginia (game was not played)
- October 11 – Washington and Lee in Blacksburg (played on this date)
- October 26 – North Carolina A&M in Blacksburg (game was not played)
- November 9 – Clemson in Charlotte, North Carolina (game was moved to October 31 and Columbia, South Carolina)
- November 16 – University of Maryland, Baltimore in Richmond, Virginia (played on this date)
- November 23 – open (Stayed open)
- November 28 – VMI in Norfolk, Virginia (played on this date)

The 1901 football schedule in the September 24 edition of The Roanoke Times included the following differences with the above schedule:

- October 12 – Washington and Lee in Blacksburg (game was moved to October 11 and played)
- October 19 – Georgetown in Washington, DC (game was played)
- October 26 – Virginia in Blacksburg (game was played)
- November 2 – North Carolina A&M in Blacksburg (game was not played)

VPI also hoped to schedule a game with the University of Georgia on November 9, but this game was not played.

After the games with St. Albans were not played on September 28 and October 5, The Richmond Dispatch reported that the teams would play each other at a horse and cattle show in Radford in late October. This game was not played.

== Before the season ==
The 1900 VPI football team compiled a 3–3–1 record and were led by Eugene Davis in his only season as head coach.

== Game summaries ==
=== Roanoke ===
VPI's first game of the season was a victory over Roanoke in Salem, Virginia.

=== Washington and Lee ===
After their victory over Roanoke, VPI played Washington and Lee University at Sheib Field.

The starting lineup for VPI was: Ware (left end), McCormick (left tackle), Willson (left guard), Steele (center), Abbott (right guard), Miles (right tackle), Campbell (right end), DeCamps (quarterback), Osterbind (left halfback), Carpenter (right halfback), Counselman (fullback). The substitutes were: Beckett.

The starting lineup for Washington and Lee was: A. McD. Smith (left end), Charles McNulty (left tackle), Americus Trundle (left guard), Charles Whipple (center), Robert Crockett (right guard), D. A. P. Laird (right tackle), Osman Swartz (right end), Henry Hall (quarterback), David Fielder (left halfback), George Haw (right halfback), James Walker (fullback). The substitutes were: Haney Conner.

=== Georgetown ===
The starting lineup for VPI was: Ramey (left end), McCormick (left tackle), Willson (left guard), Steele (center), Abbott (right guard), Miles (right tackle), Campbell (right end), DeCamps (quarterback), Wilcox (left halfback), Carpenter (right halfback), Counselman (fullback). The substitutes were: Davidson and Sayers.

The starting lineup for Georgetown was: Jimmy Kimberger (left end), Murray Russell (left tackle), Henry Hamm (left guard), Percy Given (center), Bill McLaughlin (right guard), Dan Mackay (right tackle), Sam Edmonston (right end), Paul Laroussini (quarterback), C. Moran Barry (left halfback), Ray Abbaticchio (right halfback), Preston Edmonston (fullback). The substitutes were: Morman, Joe Reilly, Joe Seitz and Frank Thedieck.

=== Virginia ===
Virginia vs. VPI

| Team | 1 | 2 | Total |
|---|---|---|---|
| • UVA | 10 | 6 | 16 |
| VPI | 0 | 0 | 0 |

- Date: October 26, 1901
- Location: Sheib Field
  Richmond, VA
- Game start: 3:30 p.m.
- Game attendance: 1,000
- Referee: M. J. Thompson (Georgetown)

The starting lineup for VPI was: Ramey (left end), McCormick (left tackle), Willson (left guard), Steele (center), Abbott (right guard), Miles (right tackle), Campbell (right end), DeCamps (quarterback), Davidson (left halfback), Carpenter (right halfback), Counselman (fullback). The substitutes were: Miller and Ware.

The starting lineup for Virginia was: Alexis Hobson (left end), Herbert Waters (left tackle), B. S. Moore (left guard), Hurt (center), Christie Benet (right guard), Bradley Walker (right tackle), Bob Williams (right end), Ed Tutwiler (quarterback), Robert Coleman (left halfback), Burnley Lankford (right halfback), Franklin Harris (fullback). The substitutes were: Church.

=== Clemson ===
The starting lineup for VPI was: Ramey (left end), Miles (left tackle), Willson (left guard), Steele (center), Abbott (right guard), McCormick (right tackle), Ware (right end), DeCamps (quarterback), Carpenter (left halfback), Huffard (right halfback), Counselman (fullback).

The starting lineup for Clemson was: William Forsythe (left end), Beef DeCosta (left tackle), Brieden (left guard), Green (center), Jack Forsythe (right guard), William Sneed (right tackle), James Lynah (right end), Lewis (quarterback), Fred Pearman (left halfback), Hunter (right halfback), Claude Douthit (fullback).

=== Maryland, Baltimore ===
Maryland, Baltimore vs. VPI

| Team | 1 | 2 | Total |
|---|---|---|---|
| MB | 0 | 0 | 0 |
| • VPI | 6 | 12 | 18 |

- Date: November 16, 1901
- Location: Broad Street Park
  Richmond, VA
- Game start: 3:00 p.m.
- Game attendance: 1,000
- Referee: Garnett Nelson

The starting lineup for VPI was: Ramey (left end), Miles (left tackle), Abbott (left guard), Steele (center), Wilson (right guard), McCormick (right tackle), Ware (right end), DeCamps (quarterback), Turner (left halfback), Carpenter (right halfback), Counselman (fullback). The substitutes were: Campbell and Huffard.

The starting lineup for Maryland, Baltimore was: Winslow (left end), Scott (left tackle), Mitchell (left guard), Buck (center), Dribble (right guard), Drewry (right tackle), Dann (right end), Coffey (quarterback), Hayden (left halfback), Burns (right halfback), Rudolph (fullback).

=== VMI ===
VMI vs. VPI

| Team | 1 | 2 | Total |
|---|---|---|---|
| VMI | 0 | 0 | 0 |
| • VPI | 11 | 10 | 21 |

- Date: November 28, 1901
- Location: League Park
  Norfolk, VA
- Game start: 2:30 p.m.
- Game attendance: 5,000
- Referee: M. J. Thompson (Georgetown)

The starting lineup for VPI was: Ramey (left end), McCormick (left tackle), Willson (left guard), Steele (center), Abbott (right guard), Miles (right tackle), Ware (right end), DeCamps (quarterback), Huffard (left halfback), Carpenter (right halfback), Counselman (fullback). The substitutes were: Campbell and Sayers.

The starting lineup for VMI was: Jennings Wise (left end), Herbert Tutwiler (left tackle), Ira Johnson (left guard), Jesse Wright (center), Richard Beirne (right guard), Thomas Rinehart (right tackle), Beverley Tucker (right end), Eugene deSteiguer (quarterback), Andrew Rawn (left halfback), Victor Perry (right halfback), John Glenn (fullback). The substitutes were: George Dewey, Edward Johnson, Marshall Milton and George Ross.

== Players ==
The following players were members of the 1901 football team according to the roster published in the 1902 and 1903 editions of The Bugle, the Virginia Tech yearbook.

VPI 1901 roster
| Quarterback: Kit DeCamps (Capt.); Guards: Alvin Lee Abbott; George Cralle Willson; Tackles: Sally Miles; Hub McCormick; Center: Joseph Clyde Steele | Ends: Ramey; Creighton Childs Campbell; Joe Ware; Halfbacks: Hunter Carpenter; John Brabson Huffard; Fullback: John Counselman | Substitutes: John Harry Beckett; Archer Davidson; George Coleman Miller; Carter Clarke Osterbind; Anderson Howard Sayers; Turner; Lalor Romaine Willcox |

== Coaching and training staff ==
- Head coach: A. B. Morrison Jr.
- Manager: James Bolton
- Assistant managers
  - Guy Aubrey Chalkley
  - J. M. Bryant

== See also ==
- 1901 College Football All-Southern Team
