= List of Florida college football state champions =

Before any school entered conference play, the highest claim for a Florida college football team was a state title. The first game in the state was between Stetson and the Florida Agricultural College in Jacksonville as part of the State Fair. Stetson won 6–0, after a sure FAC score was obstructed by a tree stump.

In 1911, the Florida Gators beat 4 South Carolina teams and dubbed themselves the "champions of South Carolina". In 1912 they joined the Southern Intercollegiate Athletic Association.

== State champions ==
- Stetson (1901)
- East Florida Seminary (1902)
- Stetson/Florida State College (1903)
- Florida State College (1904)
- Stetson (1905)
- Stetson (1906)
- Stetson/Florida (1907)
- Rollins (1908)
- Stetson (1909)
