= 1901 Navy Midshipmen football team =

American college football season

1901 Navy Midshipmen football
- Conference: Independent
- Record: 6–4–1
- Head coach: Art Hillebrand (1st season)
- Captain: Neil Nichols
- Home stadium: Worden Field

1901 Southern college football independents records
| | Conf. | | | Overall |
| Team | W | L | T | W | | L | | T |
|---|---|---|---|---|---|---|---|---|
| Southwestern Louisiana Industrial | | – | | 2 | – | 0 | – | 0 |
| Stetson | | – | | 1 | – | 0 | – | 0 |
| Georgia Tech | | – | | 4 | – | 0 | – | 1 |
| Marshall | | – | | 2 | – | 0 | – | 1 |
| Kentucky University | | – | | 7 | – | 1 | – | 1 |
| VPI | | – | | 6 | – | 1 | – | 0 |
| Nashville | | – | | 6 | – | 1 | – | 1 |
| Virginia | | – | | 8 | – | 2 | – | 0 |
| Texas | | – | | 8 | – | 2 | – | 1 |
| Davidson | | – | | 4 | – | 2 | – | 0 |
| Baylor | | – | | 5 | – | 3 | – | 0 |
| Gallaudet | | – | | 4 | – | 2 | – | 2 |
| Sewanee | | – | | 4 | – | 2 | – | 2 |
| William & Mary | | – | | 2 | – | 1 | – | 1 |
| Navy | | – | | 6 | – | 4 | – | 1 |
| VMI | | – | | 4 | – | 3 | – | 0 |
| Oklahoma | | – | | 3 | – | 2 | – | 0 |
| West Virginia | | – | | 3 | – | 2 | – | 0 |
| Delaware | | – | | 5 | – | 4 | – | 0 |
| Georgetown | | – | | 3 | – | 3 | – | 2 |
| Kendall | | – | | 2 | – | 2 | – | 0 |
| Spring Hill | | – | | 0 | – | 0 | – | 1 |
| Wilmington Conference Academy | | – | | 2 | – | 2 | – | 0 |
| Oklahoma A&M | | – | | 2 | – | 3 | – | 0 |
| South Carolina | | – | | 3 | – | 4 | – | 0 |
| Arkansas | | – | | 3 | – | 5 | – | 0 |
| Add-Ran | | – | | 1 | – | 2 | – | 1 |
| Furman | | – | | 1 | – | 2 | – | 1 |
| Chilocco | | – | | 2 | – | 5 | – | 0 |
| North Carolina A&M | | – | | 1 | – | 2 | – | 0 |
| Texas A&M | | – | | 1 | – | 4 | – | 0 |
| Maryland | | – | | 1 | – | 7 | – | 0 |
| Richmond | | – | | 1 | – | 7 | – | 0 |
| Florida Agricultural | | – | | 0 | – | 1 | – | 0 |
| Louisiana Industrial | | – | | 0 | – | 2 | – | 0 |
| Tusculum | | – | | | | – |

The 1901 Navy Midshipmen football team was an American football team that represented the United States Naval Academy as an independent during the 1901 college football season. In it first season under head coach Art Hillebrand, the team compiled a 6–4–1 record and outscored opponents by a total of 113 to 81.

President Theodore Roosevelt attended the Army–Navy Game in Philadelphia on December 1. A newspaper account noted: "For the first time in the history of foot-ball a President of the United States added dignity to a noted contest by his presence."

== Schedule ==
| Date | Opponent | Site | Result | Attendance | Source |
|---|---|---|---|---|---|
| October 5 | Georgetown | Worden Field; Annapolis, MD | T 0–0 | | |
| October 9 | St. John's (MD) | Worden Field; Annapolis, MD | W 28–2 | | |
| October 12 | Yale | Worden Field; Annapolis, MD | L 0–24 | | |
| October 19 | Lehigh | Worden Field; Annapolis, MD | W 18–0 | | |
| October 21 | Penn | Worden Field; Annapolis, MD | W 6–5 | | |
| October 26 | Penn State | Worden Field; Annapolis, MD | L 6–11 | | |
| November 2 | Dickinson | Worden Field; Annapolis, MD | W 12–6 | | |
| November 9 | Carlisle | Worden Field; Annapolis, MD | W 16–5 | | |
| November 16 | Washington & Jefferson | Worden Field; Annapolis, MD | W 17–11 | | |
| November 23 | Columbia | Worden Field; Annapolis, MD | L 5–6 | | |
| November 30 | vs. Army | Franklin Field; Philadelphia, PA (Army–Navy Game) | L 5–11 | 28,000 | |
