= 1901 Marshall Thundering Herd football team =

American college football season

1901 Marshall Thundering Herd football
- Conference: Independent
- Record: 2–0–1
- Head coach: None
- Home stadium: Central Field

1901 Southern college football independents records
| | Conf. | | | Overall |
| Team | W | L | T | W | | L | | T |
|---|---|---|---|---|---|---|---|---|
| Southwestern Louisiana Industrial | | – | | 2 | – | 0 | – | 0 |
| Stetson | | – | | 1 | – | 0 | – | 0 |
| Georgia Tech | | – | | 4 | – | 0 | – | 1 |
| Marshall | | – | | 2 | – | 0 | – | 1 |
| Kentucky University | | – | | 7 | – | 1 | – | 1 |
| VPI | | – | | 6 | – | 1 | – | 0 |
| Nashville | | – | | 6 | – | 1 | – | 1 |
| Virginia | | – | | 8 | – | 2 | – | 0 |
| Texas | | – | | 8 | – | 2 | – | 1 |
| Davidson | | – | | 4 | – | 2 | – | 0 |
| Baylor | | – | | 5 | – | 3 | – | 0 |
| Gallaudet | | – | | 4 | – | 2 | – | 2 |
| Sewanee | | – | | 4 | – | 2 | – | 2 |
| William & Mary | | – | | 2 | – | 1 | – | 1 |
| Navy | | – | | 6 | – | 4 | – | 1 |
| VMI | | – | | 4 | – | 3 | – | 0 |
| Oklahoma | | – | | 3 | – | 2 | – | 0 |
| West Virginia | | – | | 3 | – | 2 | – | 0 |
| Delaware | | – | | 5 | – | 4 | – | 0 |
| Georgetown | | – | | 3 | – | 3 | – | 2 |
| Kendall | | – | | 2 | – | 2 | – | 0 |
| Spring Hill | | – | | 0 | – | 0 | – | 1 |
| Wilmington Conference Academy | | – | | 2 | – | 2 | – | 0 |
| Oklahoma A&M | | – | | 2 | – | 3 | – | 0 |
| South Carolina | | – | | 3 | – | 4 | – | 0 |
| Arkansas | | – | | 3 | – | 5 | – | 0 |
| Add-Ran | | – | | 1 | – | 2 | – | 1 |
| Furman | | – | | 1 | – | 2 | – | 1 |
| Chilocco | | – | | 2 | – | 5 | – | 0 |
| North Carolina A&M | | – | | 1 | – | 2 | – | 0 |
| Texas A&M | | – | | 1 | – | 4 | – | 0 |
| Maryland | | – | | 1 | – | 7 | – | 0 |
| Richmond | | – | | 1 | – | 7 | – | 0 |
| Florida Agricultural | | – | | 0 | – | 1 | – | 0 |
| Louisiana Industrial | | – | | 0 | – | 2 | – | 0 |
| Tusculum | | – | | | | – |

The 1901 Marshall Thundering Herd football team represented Marshall University as an independent during the 1901 college football season. The team did not have a coach, and outscored their opponents 25–0 in three games.

The 1900 season marked the third undefeated season in a row for Marshall, as well as the third consecutive season without allowing a point.

== Schedule ==
| Date | Opponent | Site | Result |
|---|---|---|---|
| October 26 | Charleston | Central Field; Huntington, WV | W 6–0 |
| November 22 | Second High School | Central Field; Huntington, WV | W 19–0 |
| November 28 | Charleston^{†} | Central Field; Huntington, WV | T 0–0 |
^{†}Homecoming
