= 1901 Kentucky University football team =

American college football season

1901 Kentucky University football

State champion
- Conference: Independent
- Record: 7–1–1
- Head coach: None

1901 Southern college football independents records
	Conf.			Overall
Team	W	L	T	W		L		T
Southwestern Louisiana Industrial		–		2	–	0	–	0
Stetson		–		1	–	0	–	0
Georgia Tech		–		4	–	0	–	1
Marshall		–		2	–	0	–	1
Kentucky University		–		7	–	1	–	1
VPI		–		6	–	1	–	0
Nashville		–		6	–	1	–	1
Virginia		–		8	–	2	–	0
Texas		–		8	–	2	–	1
Davidson		–		4	–	2	–	0
Baylor		–		5	–	3	–	0
Gallaudet		–		4	–	2	–	2
Sewanee		–		4	–	2	–	2
William & Mary		–		2	–	1	–	1
Navy		–		6	–	4	–	1
VMI		–		4	–	3	–	0
Oklahoma		–		3	–	2	–	0
West Virginia		–		3	–	2	–	0
Delaware		–		5	–	4	–	0
Georgetown		–		3	–	3	–	2
Kendall		–		2	–	2	–	0
Spring Hill		–		0	–	0	–	1
Wilmington Conference Academy		–		2	–	2	–	0
Oklahoma A&M		–		2	–	3	–	0
South Carolina		–		3	–	4	–	0
Arkansas		–		3	–	5	–	0
Add-Ran		–		1	–	2	–	1
Furman		–		1	–	2	–	1
Chilocco		–		2	–	5	–	0
North Carolina A&M		–		1	–	2	–	0
Texas A&M		–		1	–	4	–	0
Maryland		–		1	–	7	–	0
Richmond		–		1	–	7	–	0
Florida Agricultural		–		0	–	1	–	0
Louisiana Industrial		–		0	–	2	–	0
Tusculum		–				–

The 1901 Kentucky University Pioneers football team was an American football team that represented Kentucky University, now known as Transylvania University, during the 1901 college football season. Hogan Yancey was on the team.

== Schedule ==
Date	Opponent	Site	Result	Attendance	Source
October 5	Central University	West Fourth Street park; Lexington, KY	W 33–0		
October 13	Georgetown (KY)	Lexington, KY	T 0–0		
October 19	Louisville YMCA	Lexington, KY	W 6–0		
October 26	Kentucky State College	Lexington, KY	W 27–0		
November 1	at Tennessee	Chilhowee Park; Knoxville, TN	W 6–0		
November 11	Indianapolis	Lexington, KY	W 29–0		
November 16	Nashville	Lexington, KY	L 5–0	2,000	
November 24	Georgetown (KY)	Lexington, KY	W 12–6		
November 28	All-Stars	Lexington, KY	W 6–0		
