= 1901 Arkansas Cardinals football team =

American college football season

1901 Arkansas Cardinals football
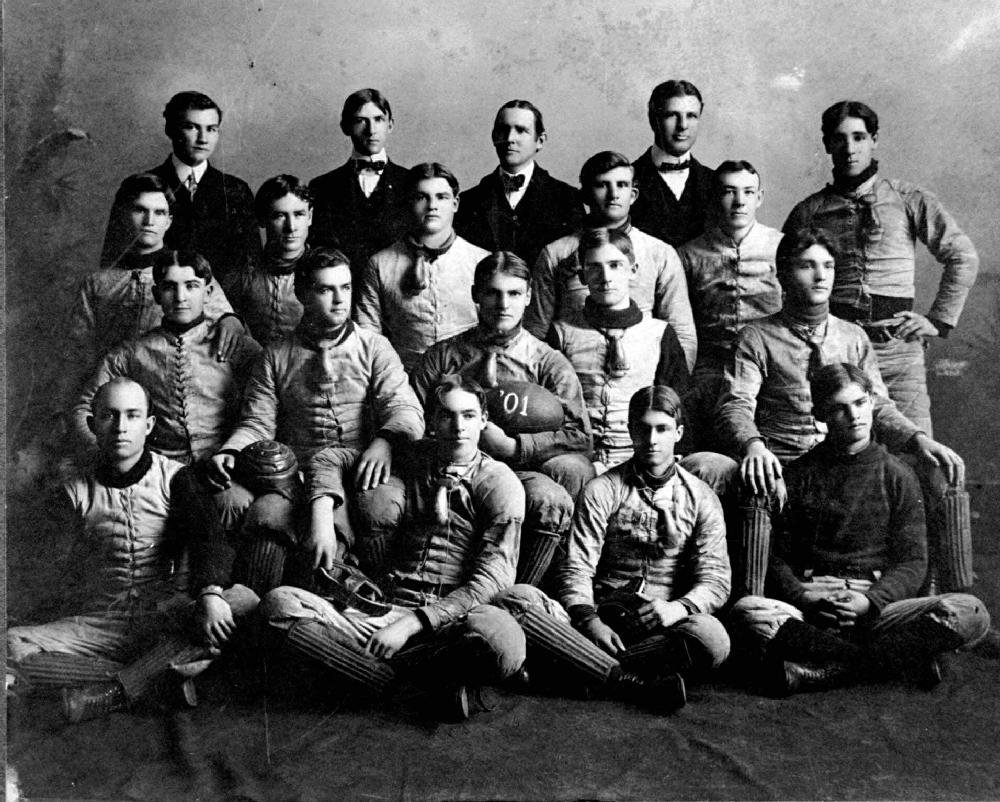
- Cardinals team photo 1901
- Conference: Independent
- Record: 3–5
- Head coach: Charles Thomas (1st season)
- Captain: Fred Brown
- Home stadium: The Hill

1901 Southern college football independents records
	Conf.			Overall
Team	W	L	T	W		L		T
Southwestern Louisiana Industrial		–		2	–	0	–	0
Stetson		–		1	–	0	–	0
Georgia Tech		–		4	–	0	–	1
Marshall		–		2	–	0	–	1
Kentucky University		–		7	–	1	–	1
VPI		–		6	–	1	–	0
Nashville		–		6	–	1	–	1
Virginia		–		8	–	2	–	0
Texas		–		8	–	2	–	1
Davidson		–		4	–	2	–	0
Baylor		–		5	–	3	–	0
Gallaudet		–		4	–	2	–	2
Sewanee		–		4	–	2	–	2
William & Mary		–		2	–	1	–	1
Navy		–		6	–	4	–	1
VMI		–		4	–	3	–	0
Oklahoma		–		3	–	2	–	0
West Virginia		–		3	–	2	–	0
Delaware		–		5	–	4	–	0
Georgetown		–		3	–	3	–	2
Kendall		–		2	–	2	–	0
Spring Hill		–		0	–	0	–	1
Wilmington Conference Academy		–		2	–	2	–	0
Oklahoma A&M		–		2	–	3	–	0
South Carolina		–		3	–	4	–	0
Arkansas		–		3	–	5	–	0
Add-Ran		–		1	–	2	–	1
Furman		–		1	–	2	–	1
Chilocco		–		2	–	5	–	0
North Carolina A&M		–		1	–	2	–	0
Texas A&M		–		1	–	4	–	0
Maryland		–		1	–	7	–	0
Richmond		–		1	–	7	–	0
Florida Agricultural		–		0	–	1	–	0
Louisiana Industrial		–		0	–	2	–	0
Tusculum		–				–

The 1901 Arkansas Cardinals football team was an American football team that represented the University of Arkansas as an independent during the 1901 college football season. In its first season under head coach Charles Thomas, the team compiled a 3–5 record and outscored opponents by a total of 98 to 52.

== Schedule ==
Date	Time	Opponent	Site	Result	Attendance	Source
October 12		Pierce City College	The Hill; Fayetteville, AR	L 0–5		
October 25		Drury	The Hill; Fayetteville, AR	W 22–0		
November 9		Fort Scott High School	The Hill; Fayetteville, AR	L 6–17		
November 15	3:48 p.m.	at Little Rock	West End Park; Little Rock, AR	L 0–5	500	
November 22		Kendall	The Hill; Fayetteville, AR	W 48–0		
November 28		Kansas City	The Hill; Fayetteville, AR	L 6–10	1,000	
December 6		at LSU	State Field; Baton Rouge, LA (rivalry)	L 0–15		
December 7		at Louisiana Industrial	Ruston, LA	W 16–0		
