= 1901 Virginia Orange and Blue football team =

American college football season

1901 Virginia Orange and Blue football
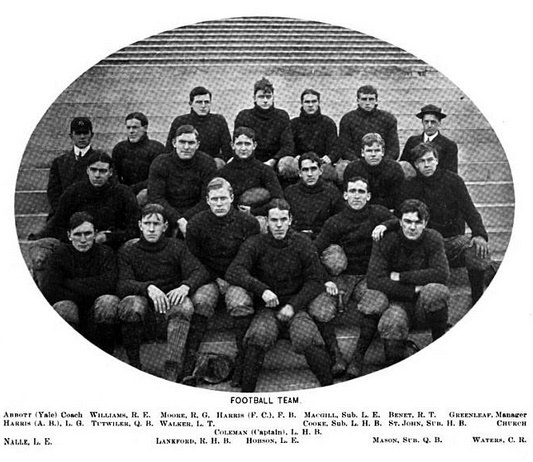

Southern champion
- Conference: Independent
- Record: 8–2
- Head coach: Westley Abbott (1st season)
- Captain: Robert M. Coleman
- Home stadium: Madison Hall Field

1901 Southern college football independents records
	Conf.			Overall
Team	W	L	T	W		L		T
Southwestern Louisiana Industrial		–		2	–	0	–	0
Stetson		–		1	–	0	–	0
Georgia Tech		–		4	–	0	–	1
Marshall		–		2	–	0	–	1
Kentucky University		–		7	–	1	–	1
VPI		–		6	–	1	–	0
Nashville		–		6	–	1	–	1
Virginia		–		8	–	2	–	0
Texas		–		8	–	2	–	1
Davidson		–		4	–	2	–	0
Baylor		–		5	–	3	–	0
Gallaudet		–		4	–	2	–	2
Sewanee		–		4	–	2	–	2
William & Mary		–		2	–	1	–	1
Navy		–		6	–	4	–	1
VMI		–		4	–	3	–	0
Oklahoma		–		3	–	2	–	0
West Virginia		–		3	–	2	–	0
Delaware		–		5	–	4	–	0
Georgetown		–		3	–	3	–	2
Kendall		–		2	–	2	–	0
Spring Hill		–		0	–	0	–	1
Wilmington Conference Academy		–		2	–	2	–	0
Oklahoma A&M		–		2	–	3	–	0
South Carolina		–		3	–	4	–	0
Arkansas		–		3	–	5	–	0
Add-Ran		–		1	–	2	–	1
Furman		–		1	–	2	–	1
Chilocco		–		2	–	5	–	0
North Carolina A&M		–		1	–	2	–	0
Texas A&M		–		1	–	4	–	0
Maryland		–		1	–	7	–	0
Richmond		–		1	–	7	–	0
Florida Agricultural		–		0	–	1	–	0
Louisiana Industrial		–		0	–	2	–	0
Tusculum		–				–

The 1901 Virginia Orange and Blue football team represented the University of Virginia as an independent during the 1901 college football season. Led by Westley Abbott in is first and only season as head coach, the team compiled a record of 8–2 and claims a Southern championship.

Several Virginia players were selected All-Southern, including Christie Benet, later a United States senator for South Carolina, and Bradley Walker, later a Nashville attorney and prominent referee. Other All-Southerns were captains Robert M. Coleman, Buck Harris, and Ed Tutwiler.

== Schedule ==
Date	Time	Opponent	Site	Result	Attendance	Source
October 2		Washington and Lee	Madison Hall Field; Charlottesville, VA	W 28–0		
October 5		Roanoke	Madison Hall Field; Charlottesville, VA	W 68–0		
October 9		St. Albans	Madison Hall Field; Charlottesville, VA	W 39–0		
October 12		Gallaudet	Madison Hall Field; Charlottesville, VA	W 24–0		
October 16		at Penn	Franklin Field; Philadelphia, PA	L 5–20	5,000	
October 24		vs. VMI	Lynchburg, VA	W 28–0		
October 26	3:30 p.m.	at VPI	Sheib Field; Blacksburg, VA (rivalry)	W 16–0	1,000	
November 16		at Georgetown	Georgetown Field; Washington, DC	L 16–17	6,000	
November 23	2:30 p.m.	vs. North Carolina	League Park; Norfolk, VA (South's Oldest Rivalry)	W 23–6	5,000	
November 28	2:00 p.m.	vs. Sewanee	Broad Street Park; Richmond, VA	W 23–5	6,000	

== Players ==
=== Starters ===
==== Line ====
Player	Position	Games started	Hometown	Prep school	Height	Weight	Age
Christie Benet	right tackle		Abbeville, South Carolina				
Buck Harris	left guard		San Antonio, Texas			164	
Alexis Hobson	left end		Richmond, Virginia			150	
B. S. Moore	right guard						
Bradley Walker	left tackle/fullback		Nashville, Tennessee		6'3"	198	
H. Dorsey Waters	center						
Bob Williams	right end		Bland, Virginia				

==== Backfield ====
Player	Position	Games started	Hometown	Prep school	Height	Weight	Age
Robert M. Coleman	left halfback		Lexington, Kentucky			142	
F. C. Harris	fullback						
Burnley Lankford	right halfback						
Ed Tutwiler	quarterback		Birmingham, Alabama				

=== Substitutes ===
Player	Position
R. D. Cooke	left halfback
C. P. MacGill	left end
J. A. Mason	quarterback
C. C. St. John	halfback

== Honors and awards ==
- All-Southern: Christie Benet, Buck Harris, Ed Tutwiler, Robert M. Coleman, Bradley Walker.
