= 1901 Sewanee Tigers football team =

American college football season

1901 Sewanee Tigers football
- Conference: Independent
- Head coach: Billy Suter (3rd season)
- Captain: Harris G. Cope
- Home stadium: Hardee Field

1901 Southern college football independents records
	Conf.			Overall
Team	W	L	T	W		L		T
Southwestern Louisiana Industrial		–		2	–	0	–	0
Stetson		–		1	–	0	–	0
Georgia Tech		–		4	–	0	–	1
Marshall		–		2	–	0	–	1
Kentucky University		–		7	–	1	–	1
VPI		–		6	–	1	–	0
Nashville		–		6	–	1	–	1
Virginia		–		8	–	2	–	0
Texas		–		8	–	2	–	1
Davidson		–		4	–	2	–	0
Baylor		–		5	–	3	–	0
Gallaudet		–		4	–	2	–	2
Sewanee		–		4	–	2	–	2
William & Mary		–		2	–	1	–	1
Navy		–		6	–	4	–	1
VMI		–		4	–	3	–	0
Oklahoma		–		3	–	2	–	0
West Virginia		–		3	–	2	–	0
Delaware		–		5	–	4	–	0
Georgetown		–		3	–	3	–	2
Kendall		–		2	–	2	–	0
Spring Hill		–		0	–	0	–	1
Wilmington Conference Academy		–		2	–	2	–	0
Oklahoma A&M		–		2	–	3	–	0
South Carolina		–		3	–	4	–	0
Arkansas		–		3	–	5	–	0
Add-Ran		–		1	–	2	–	1
Furman		–		1	–	2	–	1
Chilocco		–		2	–	5	–	0
North Carolina A&M		–		1	–	2	–	0
Texas A&M		–		1	–	4	–	0
Maryland		–		1	–	7	–	0
Richmond		–		1	–	7	–	0
Florida Agricultural		–		0	–	1	–	0
Louisiana Industrial		–		0	–	2	–	0
Tusculum		–				–

The 1901 Sewanee Tigers football team was an American football team that represented the Sewanee Tigers of Sewanee: The University of the South as an independent during the 1901 college football season. In its third season under head coach Billy Suter, the team compiled a 4–2–2 record.

Sewanee was a member of the Southern Intercollegiate Athletic Association during the majority of the 1901 season. However, the association indefinitely suspended Sewanee on November 26, 1901, for allowing an ineligible player to participate in the November 16 game against Vanderbilt.

== Schedule ==
Date	Time	Opponent	Site	Result	Attendance	Source
September 28		Mooney's School	Hardee Field; Sewanee, TN	T 0–0		
October 17		Southwestern Presbyterian	Hardee Field; Sewanee, TN (rivalry)	W 40–0		
October 21		Georgia	Hardee Field; Sewanee, TN	W 47–0		
October 25		Cumberland (TN)	Hardee Field; Sewanee, TN	W 44–5		
November 2		at Nashville	Peabody Field; Nashville, TN	L 6–39		
November 8		Mooney	Hardee Field; Sewanee, TN	W 23–0		
November 16		at Vanderbilt	Dudley Field; Nashville, TN (rivalry)	T 0–0		
November 28	2:00 p.m.	at Virginia	Broad Street Park; Richmond, VA	L 5–23	6,000	
