= 1901 William & Mary Orange and White football team =

American college football season

1901 William & Mary Orange and White football
- Conference: Independent
- Record: 2–1–1
- Head coach: None
- Captain: Oscar L. Shewmake

1901 Southern college football independents records
	Conf.			Overall
Team	W	L	T	W		L		T
Southwestern Louisiana Industrial		–		2	–	0	–	0
Stetson		–		1	–	0	–	0
Georgia Tech		–		4	–	0	–	1
Marshall		–		2	–	0	–	1
Kentucky University		–		7	–	1	–	1
VPI		–		6	–	1	–	0
Nashville		–		6	–	1	–	1
Virginia		–		8	–	2	–	0
Texas		–		8	–	2	–	1
Davidson		–		4	–	2	–	0
Baylor		–		5	–	3	–	0
Gallaudet		–		4	–	2	–	2
Sewanee		–		4	–	2	–	2
William & Mary		–		2	–	1	–	1
Navy		–		6	–	4	–	1
VMI		–		4	–	3	–	0
Oklahoma		–		3	–	2	–	0
West Virginia		–		3	–	2	–	0
Delaware		–		5	–	4	–	0
Georgetown		–		3	–	3	–	2
Kendall		–		2	–	2	–	0
Spring Hill		–		0	–	0	–	1
Wilmington Conference Academy		–		2	–	2	–	0
Oklahoma A&M		–		2	–	3	–	0
South Carolina		–		3	–	4	–	0
Arkansas		–		3	–	5	–	0
Add-Ran		–		1	–	2	–	1
Furman		–		1	–	2	–	1
Chilocco		–		2	–	5	–	0
North Carolina A&M		–		1	–	2	–	0
Texas A&M		–		1	–	4	–	0
Maryland		–		1	–	7	–	0
Richmond		–		1	–	7	–	0
Florida Agricultural		–		0	–	1	–	0
Louisiana Industrial		–		0	–	2	–	0
Tusculum		–				–

The 1901 William & Mary Orange and White football team in Virginia, United States represented William & Mary during the 1901 college football season.

== Schedule ==
Date	Opponent	Site	Result	Source
October 22	Old Point Comfort	Williamsburg, VA	W 11–6	
October 29	Randolph–Macon	Williamsburg, VA	T 0–0	
November 9	Richmond	Williamsburg, VA (rivalry)	L 11–26	
November 16	Fredericksburg	Williamsburg, VA	W 6–0	
