= 1901 Davidson football team =

American college football season

1901 Davidson football
- Conference: Independent
- Record: 4–2
- Head coach: John A. Brewin (2nd season)
- Home stadium: Latta Park Baseball Field

1901 Southern college football independents records
	Conf.			Overall
Team	W	L	T	W		L		T
Southwestern Louisiana Industrial		–		2	–	0	–	0
Stetson		–		1	–	0	–	0
Georgia Tech		–		4	–	0	–	1
Marshall		–		2	–	0	–	1
Kentucky University		–		7	–	1	–	1
VPI		–		6	–	1	–	0
Nashville		–		6	–	1	–	1
Virginia		–		8	–	2	–	0
Texas		–		8	–	2	–	1
Davidson		–		4	–	2	–	0
Baylor		–		5	–	3	–	0
Gallaudet		–		4	–	2	–	2
Sewanee		–		4	–	2	–	2
William & Mary		–		2	–	1	–	1
Navy		–		6	–	4	–	1
VMI		–		4	–	3	–	0
Oklahoma		–		3	–	2	–	0
West Virginia		–		3	–	2	–	0
Delaware		–		5	–	4	–	0
Georgetown		–		3	–	3	–	2
Kendall		–		2	–	2	–	0
Spring Hill		–		0	–	0	–	1
Wilmington Conference Academy		–		2	–	2	–	0
Oklahoma A&M		–		2	–	3	–	0
South Carolina		–		3	–	4	–	0
Arkansas		–		3	–	5	–	0
Add-Ran		–		1	–	2	–	1
Furman		–		1	–	2	–	1
Chilocco		–		2	–	5	–	0
North Carolina A&M		–		1	–	2	–	0
Texas A&M		–		1	–	4	–	0
Maryland		–		1	–	7	–	0
Richmond		–		1	–	7	–	0
Florida Agricultural		–		0	–	1	–	0
Louisiana Industrial		–		0	–	2	–	0
Tusculum		–				–

The 1901 Davidson football team was an American football team that represented the Davidson College as an independent during the 1901 college football season. In their second year under head coach John A. Brewin, the team compiled a 4–2 record.

== Schedule ==
Date	Opponent	Site	Result	Source
October 4	Guilford	Davidson, NC	W 24–0	
October 18	North Carolina Military Institute	Davidson, NC	W 23–0	
October 26	vs. North Carolina	Latta Park Baseball Field; Charlotte, NC	L 0–6	
October 30	at South Carolina	State Fairgrounds; Columbia, SC	W 12–5	
November 15	at Georgia	Herty Field; Athens, GA	W 16–6	
November 28	at North Carolina A&M	State Fairgrounds; Raleigh, NC	L 6–27	
