= 1901 Georgetown Blue and Gray football team =

American college football season

1901 Georgetown Blue and Gray football
- Conference: Independent
- Record: 3–3–2
- Head coach: William W. Church (2nd season)
- Captain: Moran Barry
- Home stadium: Georgetown Field

1901 Southern college football independents records
	Conf.			Overall
Team	W	L	T	W		L		T
Southwestern Louisiana Industrial		–		2	–	0	–	0
Stetson		–		1	–	0	–	0
Georgia Tech		–		4	–	0	–	1
Marshall		–		2	–	0	–	1
Kentucky University		–		7	–	1	–	1
VPI		–		6	–	1	–	0
Nashville		–		6	–	1	–	1
Virginia		–		8	–	2	–	0
Texas		–		8	–	2	–	1
Davidson		–		4	–	2	–	0
Baylor		–		5	–	3	–	0
Gallaudet		–		4	–	2	–	2
Sewanee		–		4	–	2	–	2
William & Mary		–		2	–	1	–	1
Navy		–		6	–	4	–	1
VMI		–		4	–	3	–	0
Oklahoma		–		3	–	2	–	0
West Virginia		–		3	–	2	–	0
Delaware		–		5	–	4	–	0
Georgetown		–		3	–	3	–	2
Kendall		–		2	–	2	–	0
Spring Hill		–		0	–	0	–	1
Wilmington Conference Academy		–		2	–	2	–	0
Oklahoma A&M		–		2	–	3	–	0
South Carolina		–		3	–	4	–	0
Arkansas		–		3	–	5	–	0
Add-Ran		–		1	–	2	–	1
Furman		–		1	–	2	–	1
Chilocco		–		2	–	5	–	0
North Carolina A&M		–		1	–	2	–	0
Texas A&M		–		1	–	4	–	0
Maryland		–		1	–	7	–	0
Richmond		–		1	–	7	–	0
Florida Agricultural		–		0	–	1	–	0
Louisiana Industrial		–		0	–	2	–	0
Tusculum		–				–

The 1901 Georgetown Blue and Gray football team was an American football team that represented Georgetown University as an independent during the 1901 college football season. In its second season under head coach William W. Church, the team compiled a 3–3–2 record and played its home games on Georgetown Field in Washington, D.C.

== Schedule ==
Date	Opponent	Site	Result	Attendance	Source
October 5	at Navy	Worden Field; Annapolis, MD	T 0–0		
October 12	at St. John's (MD)	Annapolis, MD	T 0–0		
October 19	VPI	Georgetown Field; Washington, DC	L 6–32		
October 26	VMI	Georgetown Field; Washington, DC	W 5–0		
November 5	at Columbia	Polo Grounds; New York, NY	L 0–18		
November 10	Gallaudet	Georgetown Field; Washington, DC	L 6–18		
November 16	Virginia	Georgetown Field; Washington, DC	W 17–16	6,000	
November 28	Lehigh	Georgetown Field; Washington, DC	W 22–0	3,000	
