= 1901 Chilocco Indians football team =

Indian School Football Team from Oklahoma

1901 Chilocco Indians football
- Conference: Independent
- Record: 2–5

1901 Southern college football independents records
	Conf.			Overall
Team	W	L	T	W		L		T
Southwestern Louisiana Industrial		–		2	–	0	–	0
Stetson		–		1	–	0	–	0
Georgia Tech		–		4	–	0	–	1
Marshall		–		2	–	0	–	1
Kentucky University		–		7	–	1	–	1
VPI		–		6	–	1	–	0
Nashville		–		6	–	1	–	1
Virginia		–		8	–	2	–	0
Texas		–		8	–	2	–	1
Davidson		–		4	–	2	–	0
Baylor		–		5	–	3	–	0
Gallaudet		–		4	–	2	–	2
Sewanee		–		4	–	2	–	2
William & Mary		–		2	–	1	–	1
Navy		–		6	–	4	–	1
VMI		–		4	–	3	–	0
Oklahoma		–		3	–	2	–	0
West Virginia		–		3	–	2	–	0
Delaware		–		5	–	4	–	0
Georgetown		–		3	–	3	–	2
Kendall		–		2	–	2	–	0
Spring Hill		–		0	–	0	–	1
Wilmington Conference Academy		–		2	–	2	–	0
Oklahoma A&M		–		2	–	3	–	0
South Carolina		–		3	–	4	–	0
Arkansas		–		3	–	5	–	0
Add-Ran		–		1	–	2	–	1
Furman		–		1	–	2	–	1
Chilocco		–		2	–	5	–	0
North Carolina A&M		–		1	–	2	–	0
Texas A&M		–		1	–	4	–	0
Maryland		–		1	–	7	–	0
Richmond		–		1	–	7	–	0
Florida Agricultural		–		0	–	1	–	0
Louisiana Industrial		–		0	–	2	–	0
Tusculum		–				–

The 1901 Chilocco Indians football team was an American football team that represented the Chilocco Indian School in the north-central Oklahoma Territory during the 1901 college football season. Records have been found of seven games played by Chilocco in the fall of 1901 and the team compiled a 2–5 in those games. One of the team's victories in 1901 was over Oklahoma A&M, now a Division I FBS program.

Chilocco was one of three Indian schools in 1901 to field football teams that competed in college football. The other two were Carlisle in Pennsylvania and Haskell in Kansas.

William Henry Dietz played football for Chilocco in the early 1900s before transferring to Friends University in the fall of 1904. Dietz was inducted into the College Football Hall of Fame.

In November 1901, a plan was announced to convert the school into an agricultural school and to increase its capacity from 400 students to 1,000 students.

== Schedule ==
Date	Opponent	Site	Result	Source
October 10	vs. Kingfisher	Athletic Park; Arkansas City, KS	L 0–18	
October 19	at Oklahoma A&M	Stillwater, Oklahoma Territory	W 6–5	
October 26	at Lewis Academy	Wichita, KS	L 6–18	
November 2	at Sumner County High School	Wellington, KS	L 0–5	
November 28	Arkansas City	Arkansas City, KS	L 0–34	
December 18	Blackwell		W 37–0	
December 25	at Arkansas City	Arkansas City, KS	L 5–16	
