= 1901 South Carolina Gamecocks football team =

American college football season

1901 South Carolina Gamecocks football
- Conference: Independent
- Record: 3–4
- Head coach: Byron W. Dickson (1st season)
- Captain: R. L. Freeman
- Home stadium: College Park

1901 Southern college football independents records
	Conf.			Overall
Team	W	L	T	W		L		T
Southwestern Louisiana Industrial		–		2	–	0	–	0
Stetson		–		1	–	0	–	0
Georgia Tech		–		4	–	0	–	1
Marshall		–		2	–	0	–	1
Kentucky University		–		7	–	1	–	1
VPI		–		6	–	1	–	0
Nashville		–		6	–	1	–	1
Virginia		–		8	–	2	–	0
Texas		–		8	–	2	–	1
Davidson		–		4	–	2	–	0
Baylor		–		5	–	3	–	0
Gallaudet		–		4	–	2	–	2
Sewanee		–		4	–	2	–	2
William & Mary		–		2	–	1	–	1
Navy		–		6	–	4	–	1
VMI		–		4	–	3	–	0
Oklahoma		–		3	–	2	–	0
West Virginia		–		3	–	2	–	0
Delaware		–		5	–	4	–	0
Georgetown		–		3	–	3	–	2
Kendall		–		2	–	2	–	0
Spring Hill		–		0	–	0	–	1
Wilmington Conference Academy		–		2	–	2	–	0
Oklahoma A&M		–		2	–	3	–	0
South Carolina		–		3	–	4	–	0
Arkansas		–		3	–	5	–	0
Add-Ran		–		1	–	2	–	1
Furman		–		1	–	2	–	1
Chilocco		–		2	–	5	–	0
North Carolina A&M		–		1	–	2	–	0
Texas A&M		–		1	–	4	–	0
Maryland		–		1	–	7	–	0
Richmond		–		1	–	7	–	0
Florida Agricultural		–		0	–	1	–	0
Louisiana Industrial		–		0	–	2	–	0
Tusculum		–				–

The 1901 South Carolina Jaguars football team was an American football team that represented South Carolina College—now known as the University of South Carolina–aas an independent during the 1901 college football season. In its first and only season under head coach Byron W. Dickson, the team compiled a 3–4 record. R. L. Freeman was the team captain. The team played its home games at the college ballpark that later became known as Davis Field in Columbia, South Carolina.

== Schedule ==
Date	Opponent	Site	Result	Attendance	Source
October 12	vs. Georgia	Augusta Baseball Park; Augusta, GA (rivalry)	L 5–10		
October 22	Furman	College Park; Columbia, SC	W 12–0		
October 24	at Bingham	Riverside Park; Asheville, NC	W 11–6		
October 30	Davidson	State Fairgrounds; Columbia, SC	L 5–12		
November 9	at Georgia Tech	Brisbane Park; Atlanta, GA	L 0–13	300	
November 12	North Carolina Military Academy	College Park; Columbia, SC	W 47–0		
November 18	at Wofford	Spartanburg, SC	L 6–11		
