= 1901 Gallaudet Bison football team =

American college football season

1901 Gallaudet Bison football
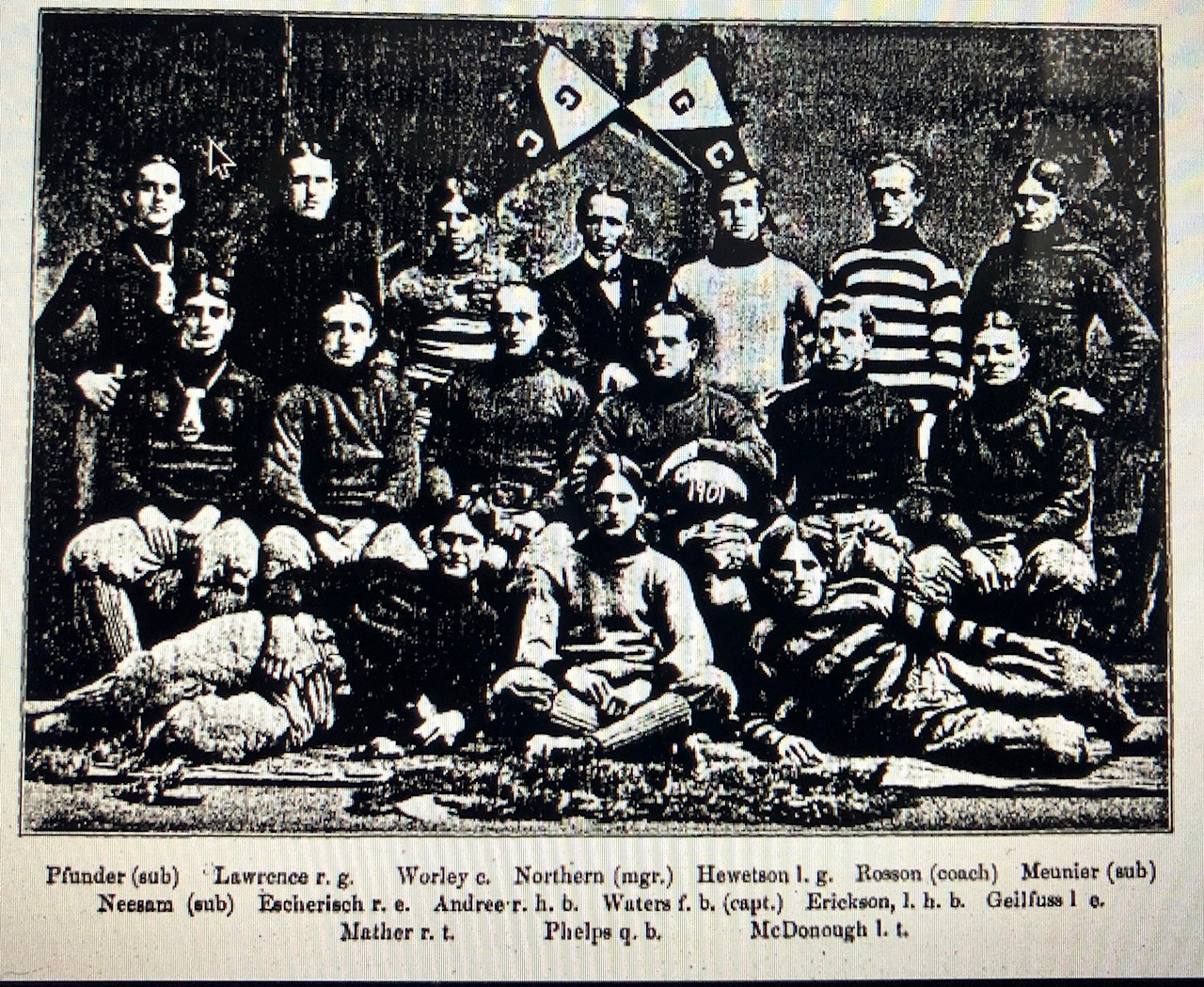
- Conference: Independent
- Record: 4–2–2
- Head coach: Ely and Rosson
- Captain: Horace B. Waters
- Home stadium: Kendall Green

1901 Southern college football independents records
	Conf.			Overall
Team	W	L	T	W		L		T
Southwestern Louisiana Industrial		–		2	–	0	–	0
Stetson		–		1	–	0	–	0
Georgia Tech		–		4	–	0	–	1
Marshall		–		2	–	0	–	1
Kentucky University		–		7	–	1	–	1
VPI		–		6	–	1	–	0
Nashville		–		6	–	1	–	1
Virginia		–		8	–	2	–	0
Texas		–		8	–	2	–	1
Davidson		–		4	–	2	–	0
Baylor		–		5	–	3	–	0
Gallaudet		–		4	–	2	–	2
Sewanee		–		4	–	2	–	2
William & Mary		–		2	–	1	–	1
Navy		–		6	–	4	–	1
VMI		–		4	–	3	–	0
Oklahoma		–		3	–	2	–	0
West Virginia		–		3	–	2	–	0
Delaware		–		5	–	4	–	0
Georgetown		–		3	–	3	–	2
Kendall		–		2	–	2	–	0
Spring Hill		–		0	–	0	–	1
Wilmington Conference Academy		–		2	–	2	–	0
Oklahoma A&M		–		2	–	3	–	0
South Carolina		–		3	–	4	–	0
Arkansas		–		3	–	5	–	0
Add-Ran		–		1	–	2	–	1
Furman		–		1	–	2	–	1
Chilocco		–		2	–	5	–	0
North Carolina A&M		–		1	–	2	–	0
Texas A&M		–		1	–	4	–	0
Maryland		–		1	–	7	–	0
Richmond		–		1	–	7	–	0
Florida Agricultural		–		0	–	1	–	0
Louisiana Industrial		–		0	–	2	–	0
Tusculum		–				–

The 1901 Gallaudet Bison football team was an American football team that represented Gallaudet College, a school for the education of the deaf and hard of hearing located in Washington, D.C. The team competed as an independent during the 1901 college football season and compiled a 4–2–2 record, highlighted by a victory over Georgetown. The team suffered its only losses to the Carlisle Indian Industrial School and southern champion Virginia. The scoreless tie with Baltimore Medical College was at the time described by the Deaf-Mutes Journal as the "prettiest game that has been seen in Baltimore." Ely and Rosson were the team's coaches.

The team included halfback Gilbert O. Erickson, who received first-team All-Southern honors. Other key players included halfback George Andree, fullback and team captain Horace B. Waters and quarterback Howe W. Phillips.

== Schedule ==
Date	Opponent	Site	Result	Attendance	Source
September 28	at Carlisle	Indian Field; Carlisle, PA	L 6–19		
October 12	at Virginia	Madison Hall Field; Charlottesville, VA	L 0–24		
October 19	at Western Maryland	Westminster, MD	W 11–0		
October 23	Villanova	Kendall Green; Washington, DC	W 12–0		
October 26	Johns Hopkins	Kendall Green; Washington, DC	W 12–0		
November 2	at St. John's (MD)	Annapolis, MD	T 6–6		
November 9	at Georgetown	Georgetown Field; Washington, DC	W 18–6		
November 28	at Baltimore Medical	Union Park; Baltimore, MD	T 0–0	800	
