= 1901 Georgia Tech football team =

American college football season

1901 Georgia Tech football
- Conference: Independent
- Record: 4–0–1
- Head coach: John McKee (1st season)
- Captain: Hope Hudson (Note: The Georgia Tech football information guide lists A. B. Hoilson as captain; however, there is no record of such a person on the team and is probably a typo.)
- Home stadium: Piedmont Park

1901 Southern college football independents records
	Conf.			Overall
Team	W	L	T	W		L		T
Southwestern Louisiana Industrial		–		2	–	0	–	0
Stetson		–		1	–	0	–	0
Georgia Tech		–		4	–	0	–	1
Marshall		–		2	–	0	–	1
Kentucky University		–		7	–	1	–	1
VPI		–		6	–	1	–	0
Nashville		–		6	–	1	–	1
Virginia		–		8	–	2	–	0
Texas		–		8	–	2	–	1
Davidson		–		4	–	2	–	0
Baylor		–		5	–	3	–	0
Gallaudet		–		4	–	2	–	2
Sewanee		–		4	–	2	–	2
William & Mary		–		2	–	1	–	1
Navy		–		6	–	4	–	1
VMI		–		4	–	3	–	0
Oklahoma		–		3	–	2	–	0
West Virginia		–		3	–	2	–	0
Delaware		–		5	–	4	–	0
Georgetown		–		3	–	3	–	2
Kendall		–		2	–	2	–	0
Spring Hill		–		0	–	0	–	1
Wilmington Conference Academy		–		2	–	2	–	0
Oklahoma A&M		–		2	–	3	–	0
South Carolina		–		3	–	4	–	0
Arkansas		–		3	–	5	–	0
Add-Ran		–		1	–	2	–	1
Furman		–		1	–	2	–	1
Chilocco		–		2	–	5	–	0
North Carolina A&M		–		1	–	2	–	0
Texas A&M		–		1	–	4	–	0
Maryland		–		1	–	7	–	0
Richmond		–		1	–	7	–	0
Florida Agricultural		–		0	–	1	–	0
Louisiana Industrial		–		0	–	2	–	0
Tusculum		–				–

The 1901 Georgia Tech football team represented the Georgia School of Technology during the 1901 college football season. The team was known as the Blacksmiths during the season.

On May 16, Georgia Tech notified that it had been suspended by the Southern Intercollegiate Athletic Association amidst charges of professionalism during the 1901 baseball season. While Georgia Tech disagreed that it had done anything against the association's rules, its president, Lyman Hall, proposed that the faculty would take hold of the management of the athletic teams to get reinstated to the SIAA. However, the SIAA would not make a permanent decision until following the football season, which meant that SIAA teams were unable to schedule football games against Georgia Tech until the matter was decided. The SIAA did not approve Georgia Tech's full reinstatement into the association until at its annual meeting on December 21.

Georgia Tech entered the 1901 season on a fourteen-game losing streak. The previous year was a financial failure, raising concerns that Tech would not be able to field a baseball or football team in 1901. However, money raised by The Atlanta Journal and through the Georgia Tech Athletic Association made it possible to secure the upcoming season. In a January 1901 meeting, Andrew Pittman was picked to continue as football manager and Hudson, 1900's left guard, was named as captain. However, by March, Pittman resigned and Stephen Snowden was elected in his place. By the time the season started, B. R. Pringle would become the team's manager.

On July 31, John McKee, former player at North Carolina and coach at North Carolina A&M, was announced as Georgia Tech's new head coach. McKee arrived in Atlanta on September 15 and the team began practice two days later. Expectations were high that McKee would keep tight control of the team and that the season would be a success. Georgia Tech was considered to have a heavy team, a strong line, and fast backs.

Coach McKee said of the team late in the season, "you may say that Tech has the strongest team she has ever put on the gridiron". The season was a great success following three straight winless seasons. The Blacksmiths finished with a 4–0–1 record and was scored against only one time. However, low attendance was still an issue, which led to the program being in debt, though not as extensively as the previous two seasons.

Following the end of Georgia Tech's season, Coach McKee accepted an invitation to assist the Georgia team in preparing for its game against Auburn. A dispute with Georgia Tech over his salary payment continued into the next summer and was only resolved after McKee threatened to file a lawsuit and the supporters of Tech's athletic association raised money to settle the matter. He did not return to the team in 1902.

== Schedule ==
Date	Time	Opponent	Site	Result	Attendance	Source
October 12	3:30 p.m.	Gordon	Piedmont Park; Atlanta, GA	W 29–0		
October 15	3:30 p.m.	Furman	Piedmont Park; Atlanta, GA	W 17–0		
October 17		Saint Albans	Piedmont Park; Atlanta, GA	Cancelled (Note: Saint Albans asked do be released from its contract due to an inability to travel.)		
October 19		Wofford	Augusta, GA	Cancelled (Note: Georgia Tech cancelled its travel to Augusta over concerns that the game would have low attendance and would not be financially viable after the slim attendance at an early match between Georgia and South Carolina.)		
October 25		at Wofford	Spartanburg, SC	W 33–0		
October 26	3:00 p.m.	at Furman	Greenville, SC	T 5–5		
November 9	3:00 p.m.	South Carolina	Piedmont Park; Atlanta, GA	W 13–0	300	
November 16	3:00 p.m.	Davidson	Piedmont Park; Atlanta, GA	Cancelled (Note: The teams originally contracted for Davidson to receive a $200 guarantee, but after seeing the lackluster crowds, Georgia Tech sent a second letter recalling the original agreement and offering 85% of the gate receipts instead. No response was received from Davidson so the game was still advertised. However, Davidson did not show up to the game and no announcement was made. The crowd arrived to find the gates locked and waited until someone arrived to inform them that the game had been called off.)		

A game was also planned with Georgia on October 12, but it did not materialize because Tech was not reinstated into the SIAA. Games was also considered against local teams from Macon and Savannah, Georgia, and Columbia, South Carolina, but Tech eventually declined these games as it felt playing professionals would hurt its chances of SIAA reinstatement. Later in the season, the team again tried to schedule a game with Georgia and explored matches with Sewanee and North Carolina. A game was also proposed against Alabama on Thanksgiving, but this game did not take place.

== Game summaries ==
Gordon Cadets (0–0–0) at Georgia Tech Blacksmiths (0–0–0)

Quarter	1	2	Total
Gordon	0	0	0
Georgia Tech	23	6	29

at Piedmont Park • Atlanta, Georgia

- Date: Saturday, October 12, 1901
- Game time: 3:30 p.m.
- Game attendance: Unknown
- Referee: Unknown

Georgia Tech's first game of the season was against Gordon. It was the first time the two schools had played. The game was played in a heavy rain and the field soon became muddy and slippery. The conditions dampened the mood of the crowd who sat "in depressing silence" throughout the game. The first half was played for fifteen minutes and the second half for only ten.

Gordon started with the ball but turned it over on downs. On Tech's first possession, it made several quick gains before Wayne Holman scored a touchdown two minutes into the game. Tech scored at will through the rest of the half with Don Towers scoring twice and Oliver Huie scoring once. Gordon's quarterback, Covington, ran into the goal post and broke his nose forcing him to leave the game. At halftime, Tech led by a score of 23 to 0.

In the second half, the Blacksmiths made substitutions to give the more players the practice. Gordon started off the half with runs up the center and looked like they would score, but Georgia Tech's defense prevented a touchdown. Tech made one touchdown in the shortened second half by Towers. The game ended with Georgia Tech winning 29 to 0, its first victory since 1897.

Furman Baptists (0–0–0) at Georgia Tech Blacksmiths (1–0–0)

Quarter	1	2	Total
Furman	0	0	0
Georgia Tech	11	6	17

at Piedmont Park • Atlanta, Georgia

- Date: Tuesday, October 15, 1901
- Game time: 3:30 p.m.
- Game attendance: Unknown
- Referee: Reynolds Tichenor

This was Furman's first game of the season and the first time the two schools had faced each other. The game was played with a twenty-minute first half and a fifteen-minute second half.

Georgia Tech won the toss and immediately had two successive runs of twenty-yards each. On the next run, Oliver Huie scored a touchdown from the 5-yard line. On its next possession, Huie made a forty-yard run for a touchdown. Georgia Tech received the next kickoff, but the half ended with the Blacksmith's on Furman's 30-yard line and Tech leading 11 to 0. The second half was marked by multiple fumbles by Furman, due, in part, by its inexperienced center. Huie scored his third touchdown in the second half. Georgia Tech won the game 17 to 0. This marked the first time Georgia Tech won back-to-back games.

Georgia Tech Blacksmiths (2–0–0) at Wofford Spartans (1–0–0)

Quarter	1	2	Total
Georgia Tech	22	11	33
Wofford	0	0	0

at Unknown Field • Spartanburg, South Carolina

- Date: Friday, October 25, 1901
- Game time: Afternoon
- Game attendance: Unknown
- Referee: Unknown

Georgia Tech was originally scheduled to play Wofford in Augusta, Georgia, a week earlier, but the game was cancelled due to concerns overt low attendance and a lack of financial viability. A game in Spartanburg, South Carolina, was added as part of Georgia Tech's travel to play a rematch with Furman in Greenville, South Carolina, the next day. This was the first time Georgia Tech and Wofford met in football. The ground was so hard that every time the men hit it, "it took the skin off".

Georgia Tech started off with the ball and immediately made a 25-yard run followed by Huie's 70-yard run for a touchdown. On its next possession, Huie made two more long runs of over twenty yards, but Tech fumbled the ball on the Wofford's 5-yard line. Wofford made two small runs and then had to punt the ball, which Georgia Tech scored another touchdown on its succeeding possession. Wofford kicked the ball off, which led to Huie running the ball down to the 2-yard line and then a run over the center for a touchdown. The Blacksmiths scored another touchdown a few minutes later. At halftime, Tech led 22 to 0.

In the second half, Wofford lost the ball on a fumble on its first possession. Georgia Tech scored on its next drive and then scored another touchdown ten minutes later. The game ended with Georgia Tech winning 33 to 0, Tech's third win in a row.

Georgia Tech Blacksmiths (3–0–0) at Furman Baptists (0–1–0)

Quarter	1	2	Total
Georgia Tech	5	0	5
Furman (Note: Furman's scoring in each half is not known.)	5	0	5

at Unknown Field • Greenville, South Carolina

- Date: Saturday, October 26, 1901
- Game time: 3:00 p.m.
- Game attendance: A large crowd
- Referee: Unknown

Georgia Tech had shutout Furman in Atlanta 17–0 earlier in the season. Georgia Tech played Wofford the day before in Spartanburg; a game that the Furman coach attended. Entering the game, Georgia Tech was quite banged up from its game against Wofford the day before.

The game was a hard-fought contest with both teams playing very well. Georgia Tech had the ball first and in the first two minutes, Huie scored a touchdown, but failed to kick the point after. Tech's left end, Wharton, was injured and had to leave the game. Hope Hudson, Tech's captain, Brinson, and Waddell also played well for the Blacksmiths. Furman scored a touchdown as well and the game ended in a tie game, 5–5.

South Carolina Gamecocks (2–2–0) at Georgia Tech Blacksmiths (3–0–1)

Quarter	1	2	Total
South Carolina	0	0	0
Georgia Tech	6	7	13

at Piedmont Park • Atlanta, Georgia

- Date: Saturday, November 9, 1901
- Game time: 3:00 p.m.
- Game attendance: 300
- Referee: Reynolds Tichenor

Georgia Tech and South Carolina were considered evenly matched coming into the game, their first ever meeting. South Carolina had won two games, including a 12–0 victory over Furman, and two close losses to Georgia and Davidson. In the lead-up to the game, Coach McKee altered the line-up to replace Wayne Holman, Tech's star right tackle who graduated and was no longer able to play. The game was originally slated to be played at Brisbine Park, but the team decided to move the match to Piedmont Park.

For the most part, the first half was an even match with both teams trading the ball. Georgia Tech won the toss and received the ball but immediately fumbled it away. South Carolina then lost the ball on a foul interference. Both teams followed with a series of punts and fumbles until about one minute to go in the first half. South Carolina fumbled the ball on its own 12-yard line. After a series of runs, Don Towers scored a 5-yard touchdown through the center of the line, and Wharton kicked the extra point. On the ensuing kickoff, the Blacksmiths lost the ball on its own 20-yard line on a foul interference call, but the time was then called. At halftime, Georgia Tech led 6 to 0.

In the second half, the teams continued to trade the ball without gaining much momentum. At one point, South Carolina's quarterback, Lee, punted the ball from its 5-yard line, but the ball went back over his head into the endzone. Georgia Tech attempted to recover it for a touchdown but fumbled to South Carolina who downed it for a safety. The teams then punted the ball back and forth several more times until Cannon scored a 65-yard touchdown around the right end with two minutes to go in the game. Georgia Tech won 13 to 0.

== Players ==
Georgia Tech Techs 1901 game starters
	Gordon	Furman	Wofford	Furman	South Carolina
Left End	Roy Wharton	Roy Wharton	Roy Wharton	Roy Wharton	Roy Wharton
Left Tackle	Don Towers	Don Towers	Don Towers	Don Towers	Don Towers
Left Guard	Bully Young	Bully Young	Bully Young	Bully Young	Moore
Center	Hope Hudson (C)	Hope Hudson (C)	Hope Hudson (C)	Hope Hudson (C)	Hope Hudson (C)
Right Guard	Lucas	Lucas	Lucas	Lucas	Lucas
Right Tackle	Wayne Holman	Wayne Holman	Wayne Holman	Wayne Holman	Bully Young
Right End	Cannon	Cannon	Cannon	Cannon	Cannon
Quarterback	Paul Brinson	Paul Brinson	Paul Brinson	Paul Brinson	Paul Brinson
Left Halfback	Oliver Huie	Oliver Huie	Oliver Huie	Oliver Huie	Oliver Huie
Right Halfback	Caserley	Caserley	Caserley	Caserley	Caserley
Fullback	Waddell	Waddell	Waddell	Waddell	Waddell
Substitutes	Frank Bell • Reddy McDaniel • George Merritt • Pendleton • Reynolds • Son Towers				
