= 1901 Maryland Aggies football team =

American college football season

1901 Maryland Aggies football
- Conference: Independent
- Record: 1–7
- Head coach: Emmons Dunbar (1st season)
- Home stadium: Maryland Agricultural College Field

1901 Southern college football independents records
	Conf.			Overall
Team	W	L	T	W		L		T
Southwestern Louisiana Industrial		–		2	–	0	–	0
Stetson		–		1	–	0	–	0
Georgia Tech		–		4	–	0	–	1
Marshall		–		2	–	0	–	1
Kentucky University		–		7	–	1	–	1
VPI		–		6	–	1	–	0
Nashville		–		6	–	1	–	1
Virginia		–		8	–	2	–	0
Texas		–		8	–	2	–	1
Davidson		–		4	–	2	–	0
Baylor		–		5	–	3	–	0
Gallaudet		–		4	–	2	–	2
Sewanee		–		4	–	2	–	2
William & Mary		–		2	–	1	–	1
Navy		–		6	–	4	–	1
VMI		–		4	–	3	–	0
Oklahoma		–		3	–	2	–	0
West Virginia		–		3	–	2	–	0
Delaware		–		5	–	4	–	0
Georgetown		–		3	–	3	–	2
Kendall		–		2	–	2	–	0
Spring Hill		–		0	–	0	–	1
Wilmington Conference Academy		–		2	–	2	–	0
Oklahoma A&M		–		2	–	3	–	0
South Carolina		–		3	–	4	–	0
Arkansas		–		3	–	5	–	0
Add-Ran		–		1	–	2	–	1
Furman		–		1	–	2	–	1
Chilocco		–		2	–	5	–	0
North Carolina A&M		–		1	–	2	–	0
Texas A&M		–		1	–	4	–	0
Maryland		–		1	–	7	–	0
Richmond		–		1	–	7	–	0
Florida Agricultural		–		0	–	1	–	0
Louisiana Industrial		–		0	–	2	–	0
Tusculum		–				–

The 1901 Maryland Aggies football team was an American football team that represented Maryland Agricultural College (later part of the University of Maryland) as an independent during the 1901 college football season. In its first and only season under head coach Emmons Dunbar, the team compiled a 1–7 record and was outscored by at total of 129 to 49. The team's only victory came in a game against a team from a U.S. Marine Corps barracks in Washington, D. C.

== Schedule ==
Date	Opponent	Site	Result	Attendance	Source
October 5	at Delaware	Union Street Grounds; Wilmington, DE	L 6–24	500	
October 16	Gallaudet (reserves)	College Park, MD	L 10–11		
October 19	Johns Hopkins	American League Park; Baltimore, MD	L 0–6		
October 30	Central High School (Washington, D.C.)	College Park, MD	L 0–11		
November 9	Rock Hill	College Park, MD	L 5–16		
November 13	U.S. Marines (Washington, D.C.)	College Park, MD	W 27–0		
November 16	at Walbrook Athletic Club	Baltimore, MD	L 0–36		
November 23	Western Maryland	College Park, MD	L 0–30		
