= 1901 VMI Keydets football team =

American college football season

1901 VMI Keydets football
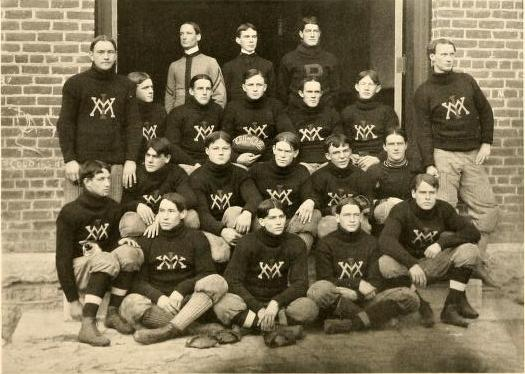
- Conference: Independent
- Record: 4–3
- Head coach: Sam Walker (2nd season)

1901 Southern college football independents records
| | Conf. | | | Overall |
| Team | W | L | T | W | | L | | T |
|---|---|---|---|---|---|---|---|---|
| Southwestern Louisiana Industrial | | – | | 2 | – | 0 | – | 0 |
| Stetson | | – | | 1 | – | 0 | – | 0 |
| Georgia Tech | | – | | 4 | – | 0 | – | 1 |
| Marshall | | – | | 2 | – | 0 | – | 1 |
| Kentucky University | | – | | 7 | – | 1 | – | 1 |
| VPI | | – | | 6 | – | 1 | – | 0 |
| Nashville | | – | | 6 | – | 1 | – | 1 |
| Virginia | | – | | 8 | – | 2 | – | 0 |
| Texas | | – | | 8 | – | 2 | – | 1 |
| Davidson | | – | | 4 | – | 2 | – | 0 |
| Baylor | | – | | 5 | – | 3 | – | 0 |
| Gallaudet | | – | | 4 | – | 2 | – | 2 |
| Sewanee | | – | | 4 | – | 2 | – | 2 |
| William & Mary | | – | | 2 | – | 1 | – | 1 |
| Navy | | – | | 6 | – | 4 | – | 1 |
| VMI | | – | | 4 | – | 3 | – | 0 |
| Oklahoma | | – | | 3 | – | 2 | – | 0 |
| West Virginia | | – | | 3 | – | 2 | – | 0 |
| Delaware | | – | | 5 | – | 4 | – | 0 |
| Georgetown | | – | | 3 | – | 3 | – | 2 |
| Kendall | | – | | 2 | – | 2 | – | 0 |
| Spring Hill | | – | | 0 | – | 0 | – | 1 |
| Wilmington Conference Academy | | – | | 2 | – | 2 | – | 0 |
| Oklahoma A&M | | – | | 2 | – | 3 | – | 0 |
| South Carolina | | – | | 3 | – | 4 | – | 0 |
| Arkansas | | – | | 3 | – | 5 | – | 0 |
| Add-Ran | | – | | 1 | – | 2 | – | 1 |
| Furman | | – | | 1 | – | 2 | – | 1 |
| Chilocco | | – | | 2 | – | 5 | – | 0 |
| North Carolina A&M | | – | | 1 | – | 2 | – | 0 |
| Texas A&M | | – | | 1 | – | 4 | – | 0 |
| Maryland | | – | | 1 | – | 7 | – | 0 |
| Richmond | | – | | 1 | – | 7 | – | 0 |
| Florida Agricultural | | – | | 0 | – | 1 | – | 0 |
| Louisiana Industrial | | – | | 0 | – | 2 | – | 0 |
| Tusculum | | – | | | | – |

The 1901 VMI Keydets football team represented the Virginia Military Institute (VMI) in their 11th season of organized football. The Keydets went 4–3 under second-year head coach Sam Walker.

== Schedule ==
| Date | Time | Opponent | Site | Result | Attendance | Source |
|---|---|---|---|---|---|---|
| October 19 | | Hampden–Sydney | VMI Parade Ground; Lexington, VA | W 30–0 | | |
| October 26 | | at Georgetown | Georgetown Field; Washington, DC | L 0–5 | | |
| October 28 | | Richmond | VMI Parade Ground; Lexington, VA (rivalry) | W 79–0 | | |
| November 4 | | at Washington and Lee | Lexington, VA | W 46–6 | | |
| November 9 | | vs. Virginia | Lynchburg, VA | L 0–29 | | |
| November 18 | | University of Maryland, Baltimore | VMI Parade Ground; Lexington, VA | W 44–0 | 500 | |
| November 28 | 2:30pm | vs. VPI | League Park; Norfolk, VA (rivalry) | L 0–21 | 5,000 | |
