= 1901 Delaware football team =

American college football season

1901 Delaware football
- Conference: Independent
- Record: 5–4
- Head coach: Herbert Rice (5th season)
- Captain: John Huxley
- Home stadium: Union Street Grounds

1901 Southern college football independents records
	Conf.			Overall
Team	W	L	T	W		L		T
Southwestern Louisiana Industrial		–		2	–	0	–	0
Stetson		–		1	–	0	–	0
Georgia Tech		–		4	–	0	–	1
Marshall		–		2	–	0	–	1
Kentucky University		–		7	–	1	–	1
VPI		–		6	–	1	–	0
Nashville		–		6	–	1	–	1
Virginia		–		8	–	2	–	0
Texas		–		8	–	2	–	1
Davidson		–		4	–	2	–	0
Baylor		–		5	–	3	–	0
Gallaudet		–		4	–	2	–	2
Sewanee		–		4	–	2	–	2
William & Mary		–		2	–	1	–	1
Navy		–		6	–	4	–	1
VMI		–		4	–	3	–	0
Oklahoma		–		3	–	2	–	0
West Virginia		–		3	–	2	–	0
Delaware		–		5	–	4	–	0
Georgetown		–		3	–	3	–	2
Kendall		–		2	–	2	–	0
Spring Hill		–		0	–	0	–	1
Wilmington Conference Academy		–		2	–	2	–	0
Oklahoma A&M		–		2	–	3	–	0
South Carolina		–		3	–	4	–	0
Arkansas		–		3	–	5	–	0
Add-Ran		–		1	–	2	–	1
Furman		–		1	–	2	–	1
Chilocco		–		2	–	5	–	0
North Carolina A&M		–		1	–	2	–	0
Texas A&M		–		1	–	4	–	0
Maryland		–		1	–	7	–	0
Richmond		–		1	–	7	–	0
Florida Agricultural		–		0	–	1	–	0
Louisiana Industrial		–		0	–	2	–	0
Tusculum		–				–

The 1901 Delaware football team represented Delaware College—now known as the University of Delaware–as an independent during the 1901 college football season. Led by Herbert Rice in his fifth and final year as head coach, Delaware compiled a record of 5–4.

== Schedule ==
Date	Time	Opponent	Site	Result	Attendance	Source
September 21		Williamson	Newark, DE	W 5–0		
October 5		Maryland	Union Street Grounds; Wilmington, DE	W 24–6	500	
October 12		at Swarthmore	Whittier Field; Swarthmore, PA	L 0–10	500	
October 19	3:00 p.m.	Haverford	Union Street Grounds; Wilmington, DE	W 6–0		
October 26	3:00 p.m.	Franklin & Marshall	Union Street Grounds; Wilmington, DE	L 2–21		
November 2		at Rutgers	Neilson Field; New Brunswick, NJ	W 6–5		
November 9		Johns Hopkins	Union Street Grounds; Wilmington, DE	L 0–27		
November 16		St. John's (MD)	Union Street Grounds; Wilmington, DE	L 5–32		
November 28		Lebanon Valley	Union Street Grounds; Wilmington, DE	W 5–0	2,000	
