= 1901 Richmond Spiders football team =

American college football season

1901 Richmond Spiders football
- Conference: Independent
- Record: 1–7
- Head coach: Garnett Nelson (1st season)
- Captain: Menalcus Lankford
- Home stadium: Broad Street Park

1901 Southern college football independents records
	Conf.			Overall
Team	W	L	T	W		L		T
Southwestern Louisiana Industrial		–		2	–	0	–	0
Stetson		–		1	–	0	–	0
Georgia Tech		–		4	–	0	–	1
Marshall		–		2	–	0	–	1
Kentucky University		–		7	–	1	–	1
VPI		–		6	–	1	–	0
Nashville		–		6	–	1	–	1
Virginia		–		8	–	2	–	0
Texas		–		8	–	2	–	1
Davidson		–		4	–	2	–	0
Baylor		–		5	–	3	–	0
Gallaudet		–		4	–	2	–	2
Sewanee		–		4	–	2	–	2
William & Mary		–		2	–	1	–	1
Navy		–		6	–	4	–	1
VMI		–		4	–	3	–	0
Oklahoma		–		3	–	2	–	0
West Virginia		–		3	–	2	–	0
Delaware		–		5	–	4	–	0
Georgetown		–		3	–	3	–	2
Kendall		–		2	–	2	–	0
Spring Hill		–		0	–	0	–	1
Wilmington Conference Academy		–		2	–	2	–	0
Oklahoma A&M		–		2	–	3	–	0
South Carolina		–		3	–	4	–	0
Arkansas		–		3	–	5	–	0
Add-Ran		–		1	–	2	–	1
Furman		–		1	–	2	–	1
Chilocco		–		2	–	5	–	0
North Carolina A&M		–		1	–	2	–	0
Texas A&M		–		1	–	4	–	0
Maryland		–		1	–	7	–	0
Richmond		–		1	–	7	–	0
Florida Agricultural		–		0	–	1	–	0
Louisiana Industrial		–		0	–	2	–	0
Tusculum		–				–

The 1901 Richmond Spiders football team was an American football team that represented Richmond College—now known as the University of Richmond—as an independent during the 1901 college football season. Led by Garnett Nelson in his first and only year as head coach, Richmond compiled a record of 1–7.

== Schedule ==
Date	Time	Opponent	Site	Result	Attendance	Source
October 10	4:00 p.m.	Randolph–Macon	Broad Street Park; Richmond, VA	L 0–6		
October 19	4:00 p.m.	Fredericksburg College	Broad Street Park; Richmond, VA	L 0–27		
October 26		at Washington and Lee	Lexington, VA	L 0–39		
October 28		at VMI	VMI Parade Ground; Lexington, VA (rivalry)	L 0–79		
November 2		Hampden–Sydney	Broad Street Park; Richmond, VA	L 0–16	400	
November 9		at William & Mary	Williamsburg, VA (rivalry)	W 26–11		
November 13		at Hampden–Sydney	Hampden Sydney, VA	L 0–70		
November 20		at Randolph–Macon	Ashland, VA	L 0–11		
