= 1901 Oklahoma A&M Aggies football team =

American college football season

1901 Oklahoma A&M Aggies football
- Conference: Independent
- Record: 2–3
- Head coach: None

1901 Southern college football independents records
| | Conf. | | | Overall |
| Team | W | L | T | W | | L | | T |
|---|---|---|---|---|---|---|---|---|
| Southwestern Louisiana Industrial | | – | | 2 | – | 0 | – | 0 |
| Stetson | | – | | 1 | – | 0 | – | 0 |
| Georgia Tech | | – | | 4 | – | 0 | – | 1 |
| Marshall | | – | | 2 | – | 0 | – | 1 |
| Kentucky University | | – | | 7 | – | 1 | – | 1 |
| VPI | | – | | 6 | – | 1 | – | 0 |
| Nashville | | – | | 6 | – | 1 | – | 1 |
| Virginia | | – | | 8 | – | 2 | – | 0 |
| Texas | | – | | 8 | – | 2 | – | 1 |
| Davidson | | – | | 4 | – | 2 | – | 0 |
| Baylor | | – | | 5 | – | 3 | – | 0 |
| Gallaudet | | – | | 4 | – | 2 | – | 2 |
| Sewanee | | – | | 4 | – | 2 | – | 2 |
| William & Mary | | – | | 2 | – | 1 | – | 1 |
| Navy | | – | | 6 | – | 4 | – | 1 |
| VMI | | – | | 4 | – | 3 | – | 0 |
| Oklahoma | | – | | 3 | – | 2 | – | 0 |
| West Virginia | | – | | 3 | – | 2 | – | 0 |
| Delaware | | – | | 5 | – | 4 | – | 0 |
| Georgetown | | – | | 3 | – | 3 | – | 2 |
| Kendall | | – | | 2 | – | 2 | – | 0 |
| Spring Hill | | – | | 0 | – | 0 | – | 1 |
| Wilmington Conference Academy | | – | | 2 | – | 2 | – | 0 |
| Oklahoma A&M | | – | | 2 | – | 3 | – | 0 |
| South Carolina | | – | | 3 | – | 4 | – | 0 |
| Arkansas | | – | | 3 | – | 5 | – | 0 |
| Add-Ran | | – | | 1 | – | 2 | – | 1 |
| Furman | | – | | 1 | – | 2 | – | 1 |
| Chilocco | | – | | 2 | – | 5 | – | 0 |
| North Carolina A&M | | – | | 1 | – | 2 | – | 0 |
| Texas A&M | | – | | 1 | – | 4 | – | 0 |
| Maryland | | – | | 1 | – | 7 | – | 0 |
| Richmond | | – | | 1 | – | 7 | – | 0 |
| Florida Agricultural | | – | | 0 | – | 1 | – | 0 |
| Louisiana Industrial | | – | | 0 | – | 2 | – | 0 |
| Tusculum | | – | | | | – |

The 1901 Oklahoma A&M Aggies football team represented Oklahoma A&M College in the 1901 college football season. This was the first year of football at A&M and the team didn't have a head coach. The Aggies played their home games in Stillwater, Oklahoma Territory. They finished the season 2–3.

== Schedule ==
| Date | Opponent | Site | Result | Attendance |
|---|---|---|---|---|
| September 27 | at Kingfisher | Kingfisher, Oklahoma Territory | L 0–12 | |
| October 12 | vs. Northwestern Territorial Normal | Perry, Oklahoma Territory | W 17–0 | |
| October 19 | Chilocco | Stillwater, Oklahoma Territory | L 5–6 | |
| November 15 | Kingfisher | Stillwater, Oklahoma Territory | L 5–11 | |
| November 28 | Pawnee Indian School | Stillwater, Oklahoma Territory | W 12–0 | 600 |
