= 1901 Texas A&M Aggies football team =

American college football season

1901 Texas A&M Aggies football
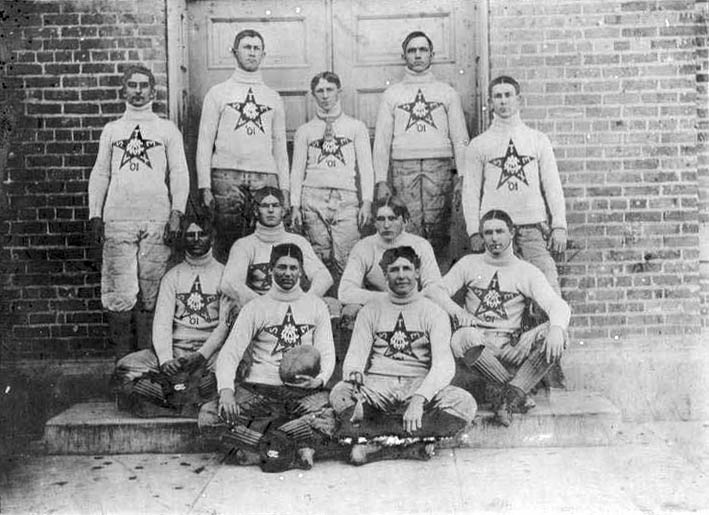
- Conference: Independent
- Record: 1–4
- Head coach: W. A. Murray (3rd season)

1901 Southern college football independents records
	Conf.			Overall
Team	W	L	T	W		L		T
Southwestern Louisiana Industrial		–		2	–	0	–	0
Stetson		–		1	–	0	–	0
Georgia Tech		–		4	–	0	–	1
Marshall		–		2	–	0	–	1
Kentucky University		–		7	–	1	–	1
VPI		–		6	–	1	–	0
Nashville		–		6	–	1	–	1
Virginia		–		8	–	2	–	0
Texas		–		8	–	2	–	1
Davidson		–		4	–	2	–	0
Baylor		–		5	–	3	–	0
Gallaudet		–		4	–	2	–	2
Sewanee		–		4	–	2	–	2
William & Mary		–		2	–	1	–	1
Navy		–		6	–	4	–	1
VMI		–		4	–	3	–	0
Oklahoma		–		3	–	2	–	0
West Virginia		–		3	–	2	–	0
Delaware		–		5	–	4	–	0
Georgetown		–		3	–	3	–	2
Kendall		–		2	–	2	–	0
Spring Hill		–		0	–	0	–	1
Wilmington Conference Academy		–		2	–	2	–	0
Oklahoma A&M		–		2	–	3	–	0
South Carolina		–		3	–	4	–	0
Arkansas		–		3	–	5	–	0
Add-Ran		–		1	–	2	–	1
Furman		–		1	–	2	–	1
Chilocco		–		2	–	5	–	0
North Carolina A&M		–		1	–	2	–	0
Texas A&M		–		1	–	4	–	0
Maryland		–		1	–	7	–	0
Richmond		–		1	–	7	–	0
Florida Agricultural		–		0	–	1	–	0
Louisiana Industrial		–		0	–	2	–	0
Tusculum		–				–

The 1901 Texas A&M Aggies football team represented the Agricultural and Mechanical College of Texas—now known as Texas A&M University—as an independent during the 1901 college football season. In its third season under head coach W. A. Murray, the team compiled a 1–4 record in three games against Baylor and two games against the Texas Longhorns. (On Nov. 28, the varsity played at Texas while a "select team" played at Baylor.)

== Schedule ==
Date	Opponent	Site	Result	Attendance	Source
October 11	vs. Baylor	State Fair Grounds field; Dallas, TX (rivalry)	L 6–17	4,000	
October 26	vs. Texas	San Antonio, TX (rivalry)	L 0–17		
November 5	Baylor	Fair Grounds; Bryan, TX	W 6–0		
November 28	at Baylor	Waco, TX	L 0–47		
November 28	at Texas	Clark Field; Austin, TX	L 0–34		
