= Kit DeCamps =

American soldier, engineer, and football player (1878–1951)

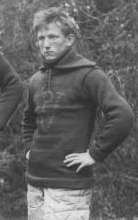
- DeCamps c. 1899

Profile
- Position: Quarterback

Personal information
- Born: 1878; Greenville, South Carolina, U.S.
- Died: August 24, 1951

Career information
- College: Virginia Tech (1899–1901)

Awards and highlights
- All-Southern substitute (1901)

Christie Jean Baptiste "Kit" DeCamps (1878 – 24 August 1951) was a war veteran, civil engineer and college football player who played for the Virginia Tech Hokies football team of the Virginia Polytechnic Institute.

== Early life ==
DeCamps was born in 1878 in Greenville, South Carolina, the son of Ghislain Modeste Decamps (1834–1896) and Mary E. Hahn (1854–1947).

== Football career ==
DeCamps was a prominent quarterback for the Virginia Tech Hokies football team of the Virginia Polytechnic Institute. He was considered very fast. He also spent three years at Furman University and a year at Richmond College.

=== 1901 ===
DeCamps was captain in 1901. He was selected a substitute on the All-Southern team.

== Military career ==
DeCamps was a quartermaster sergeant of Company B, second South Carolina regiment. DeCamps served in the Spanish–American War.

== Family ==
On November 23, 1907, DeCamps married Lois Catherine Sykes (1881–1924), daughter of Tiberius Constantine Sykes and Alice E. Luke, in Portsmouth, Virginia. They had three children.

- Captain William Luke deCamps (July 6, 1911 – May 12, 1991), served in the 111th Field Artillery battalion of the 29th Infantry Division during Operation Overlord.
- Lois Sykes Decamps (1912–1991), married the diplomat George H. Steuart on May 28, 1938 in Wallacetown, Virginia
- Charles Decamps (1914–1991), who served in Italy during World War II

DeCamps died on August 24, 1951.
