= Westley Abbott =

American football coach and lawyer (1877–1941)

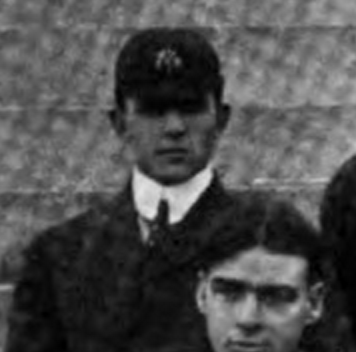
- Abbott pictured in the 1901 Virginia football team photo

Biographical details
- Born: February 25, 1877
- Died: June 26, 1941 (aged 64); New York, New York, U.S.
- Education: Yale University

Coaching career (HC unless noted)
- 1901: Virginia

Head coaching record
- Overall: 8–2

Charles Westley Abbott (February 25, 1877 – June 26, 1941) was an American college football coach and lawyer who served as the head football coach at the University of Virginia for one season in 1901, compiling a record of 8–2. He graduated from Yale University in 1899 and New York Law School in 1901, then practiced law in New York City as a firm member of Littlefield, Abbott, and Marshall. He died at his home on the Upper East Side of New York City, aged 64.

== Head coaching record ==
Year	Team	Overall	Conference	Standing	Bowl/playoffs
Virginia Orange and Blue (Independent) (1901)
1901	Virginia	8–2			
Virginia:		8–2			
Total:		8–2			
