= W. R. Ritchie =

American football player and coach, professor, and civil engineer (1876–1970)

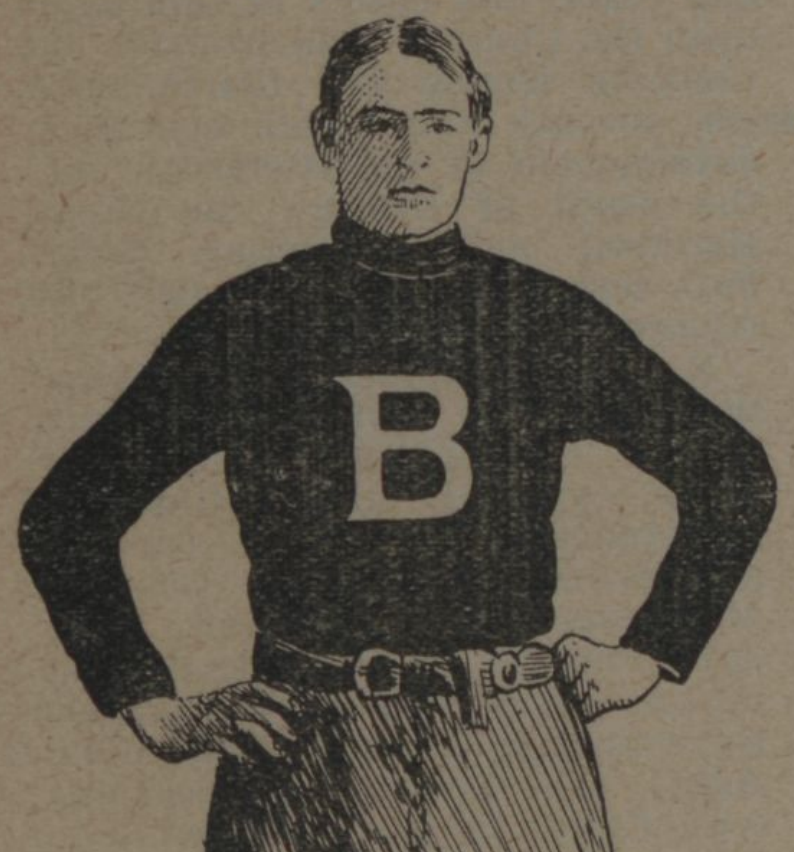
- Sketch of W. R. Ritchie from The Lariat, Baylor newspaper

Biographical details
- Born: January 25, 1876; Rabun Gap, Georgia, U.S.
- Died: January 18, 1970 (aged 93); Sacramento, California, U.S.
- Education: University of Georgia (1900)

Playing career
- 1898–1899: Georgia
- Position: Tackle

Coaching career (HC unless noted)
- 1901: Baylor

Head coaching record
- Overall: 5–3

William Riley Ritchie Sr. (January 25, 1876 – January 18, 1970) was an American college football player and coach, mathematics professor, and civil engineer. He was the second head football coach at Baylor University, serving for on year, in 1901 and compiling a record of 5–3. He was also the chairman of Baylor's mathematics department. Ritchie graduated in 1900 from the University of Georgia, where he played football.

In 1906, Ritchie was residing at Campbell, Texas, working as a mathematics professor at Henry College. He later worked a civil engineer for the Missouri–Kansas–Texas Railroad subsequently went into various businesses in banking, livestock, logging, and oil. Ritchie retired in 1954 and moved to Carmichael, California in 1960. He died on January 18, 1970, at a hospital in Sacramento, California.

== Head coaching record ==
Year	Team	Overall	Conference	Standing	Bowl/playoffs
Baylor (Independent) (1901)
1901	Baylor	5–3			
Baylor:		5–3			
Total:		5–3			
