= 1901 Nashville Garnet and Blue football team =

American college football season

1901 Nashville Garnet and Blue football
- Conference: Independent
- Record: 6–1–1
- Head coach: Charley Moran (2nd season)
- Home stadium: Peabody Field

1901 Southern college football independents records
	Conf.			Overall
Team	W	L	T	W		L		T
Southwestern Louisiana Industrial		–		2	–	0	–	0
Stetson		–		1	–	0	–	0
Georgia Tech		–		4	–	0	–	1
Marshall		–		2	–	0	–	1
Kentucky University		–		7	–	1	–	1
VPI		–		6	–	1	–	0
Nashville		–		6	–	1	–	1
Virginia		–		8	–	2	–	0
Texas		–		8	–	2	–	1
Davidson		–		4	–	2	–	0
Baylor		–		5	–	3	–	0
Gallaudet		–		4	–	2	–	2
Sewanee		–		4	–	2	–	2
William & Mary		–		2	–	1	–	1
Navy		–		6	–	4	–	1
VMI		–		4	–	3	–	0
Oklahoma		–		3	–	2	–	0
West Virginia		–		3	–	2	–	0
Delaware		–		5	–	4	–	0
Georgetown		–		3	–	3	–	2
Kendall		–		2	–	2	–	0
Spring Hill		–		0	–	0	–	1
Wilmington Conference Academy		–		2	–	2	–	0
Oklahoma A&M		–		2	–	3	–	0
South Carolina		–		3	–	4	–	0
Arkansas		–		3	–	5	–	0
Add-Ran		–		1	–	2	–	1
Furman		–		1	–	2	–	1
Chilocco		–		2	–	5	–	0
North Carolina A&M		–		1	–	2	–	0
Texas A&M		–		1	–	4	–	0
Maryland		–		1	–	7	–	0
Richmond		–		1	–	7	–	0
Florida Agricultural		–		0	–	1	–	0
Louisiana Industrial		–		0	–	2	–	0
Tusculum		–				–

The 1901 Nashville Garnet and Blue football team represented the University of Nashville during the 1901 college football season. The second of first two opponents is unknown. The 1901 team was likely the best football team in Nashville's history. Coached by Charley Moran, though they lost to southern power Vanderbilt, they "mopped up with about everything else."

== Schedule ==
Date	Time	Opponent	Site	Result	Attendance
October 2		at Mooney School*	Franklin, TN	W 11–0	
October 5		at		W ?–?	
October 12		vs. Texas	Dallas Fair Grounds; Dallas, TX	T 5–5	
October 19		at Auburn	Birmingham, AL	W 23–5	
October 26		Tennessee	Peabody Field; Nashville, TN	W 16–5	
November 2		Sewanee	Peabody Field; Nashville, TN	W 39–6	
November 16		at Kentucky University	Lexington, KY	W 5–0	
November 28	2:00 p.m.	Vanderbilt	Dudley Field; Nashville, TN	L 0–10	5,000
*Non-conference game

== Season summary ==
=== At Mooney School ===
Nashville at Mooney School

Team	1	2	Total
• Nashville	11	0	11
Mooney	0	0	0

- Date: October 2
- Location: Franklin, Tennessee
- Referee: Frank

To open the season, Nashville defeated the Mooney School 11–0.

The starting lineup was Choate (left end), Blackburn (left tackle), Majors (left guard) Hawkins (center), Peake (right guard), Keller (right tackle), Kuykendall (right end), Church (quarterback), Reeves (left halfback), F. White (right halfback), Holland (fullback).

=== At Texas ===
Nashville at Texas

Team	1	2	Total
Nashville	0	5	5
Texas	5	0	5

- Date: October 12
- Location: Dallas, Texas
- Referee: Andrews

Nashville tied the Texas Longhorns 5–5, in front of what was then the largest crowd ever to see a game in Dallas.

The starting lineup was Choate (left end), Blackborn (left tackle), Peake (left guard) Hawkins (center), Majors (right guard), Keller (right tackle), Kuykendall (right end), Pollard (quarterback), Reeves (left halfback), F. White (right halfback), Biddle (fullback).

=== Auburn ===
Nashville upset Auburn 23–5.

=== Tennessee ===
Nashville surprised again and beat Tennessee 16–5. Tennessee had just come off a tie of Clemson, when Clemson had in turn come off a 122–0 victory on opening day.

=== Sewanee ===
Sewanee at Nashville

Team	1	2	Total
Sewanee	6	0	6
• Nashville	11	28	39

- Date: November 2
- Location: Peabody Field
  Nashville, Tennessee
- Game start: 3:00 p. m.
- Referee: George W. Rowbotham (Memphis)

Arguably the year's biggest win, Nashville kept up its win streak and beat Sewanee 39–6, then the worst defeat ever suffered by Sewanee. Nashville simply outweighed the Tigers. Ormond Simkins scored first. Biddle once got a touchdown on a 35-yard run.

The starting lineup was Choate (left end), Blackburn (left tackle), Majors (left guard) Hankins (center), Peake (right guard), Keller (right tackle), Kuykendall (right end), Pollard (quarterback), Reeves (left halfback), F. White (right halfback), Biddle (fullback).

=== At Kentucky University ===
Nashville beat state champion Kentucky University in Lexington 5–0. Kentucky governor J. C. W. Beckham made a 15-yard kick to ceremonially start the contest. Fullback Bidwell made the touchdown.

=== At Vanderbilt ===
Nashville vs. Vanderbilt

Team	1	2	Total
Nashville	0	0	0
• Vanderbilt	5	5	10

- Date: November 28
- Location: Dudley Field
  Nashville, Tennessee
- Game start: 2:00 p. m.
- Game attendance: 5,000
- Referee: George W. Rowbotham (Memphis)

Three Nashville players were ruled ineligible. The Commodores practiced in secret for ten days in preparation. Vanderbilt faced Nashville on Thanksgiving Day and won 10–0 in front of 4 to 5,000 spectators, using "Harvard tactics." After thirty minutes of gameplay, John Edgerton scored a touchdown taking the wind out of the sails of Nashville rooters. A riot broke out downtown the next day. According to the account of the event in the Nashville Banner (repudiated in the Hustler), the trouble started when a number of Vanderbilt students "tried to paint the stone fence of the University of Nashville yellow and black."

The starting lineup was Choate (left end), Blackborn (left tackle), Majors (left guard) Hankins (center), Peake (right guard), Keller (right tackle), Kuykendall (right end), Pollard (quarterback), Reeves (left halfback), F. White (right halfback), Biddle (fullback).

== Postseason ==
Amidst charges of professionalism, Nashville was blacklisted from the SIAA.
