= 1901 Florida Agricultural College football team =

College football season

1901 Florida Agricultural College football
- Conference: Independent
- Record: 0–1
- Head coach: James M. Farr (1st season)

1901 Southern college football independents records
	Conf.			Overall
Team	W	L	T	W		L		T
Southwestern Louisiana Industrial		–		2	–	0	–	0
Stetson		–		1	–	0	–	0
Georgia Tech		–		4	–	0	–	1
Marshall		–		2	–	0	–	1
Kentucky University		–		7	–	1	–	1
VPI		–		6	–	1	–	0
Nashville		–		6	–	1	–	1
Virginia		–		8	–	2	–	0
Texas		–		8	–	2	–	1
Davidson		–		4	–	2	–	0
Baylor		–		5	–	3	–	0
Gallaudet		–		4	–	2	–	2
Sewanee		–		4	–	2	–	2
William & Mary		–		2	–	1	–	1
Navy		–		6	–	4	–	1
VMI		–		4	–	3	–	0
Oklahoma		–		3	–	2	–	0
West Virginia		–		3	–	2	–	0
Delaware		–		5	–	4	–	0
Georgetown		–		3	–	3	–	2
Kendall		–		2	–	2	–	0
Spring Hill		–		0	–	0	–	1
Wilmington Conference Academy		–		2	–	2	–	0
Oklahoma A&M		–		2	–	3	–	0
South Carolina		–		3	–	4	–	0
Arkansas		–		3	–	5	–	0
Add-Ran		–		1	–	2	–	1
Furman		–		1	–	2	–	1
Chilocco		–		2	–	5	–	0
North Carolina A&M		–		1	–	2	–	0
Texas A&M		–		1	–	4	–	0
Maryland		–		1	–	7	–	0
Richmond		–		1	–	7	–	0
Florida Agricultural		–		0	–	1	–	0
Louisiana Industrial		–		0	–	2	–	0
Tusculum		–				–

The 1901 Florida Agricultural College football team represented the Florida Agricultural College in the sport of American football during the 1901 college football season. This was not the modern Florida Gators of the University of Florida in Gainesville, which begins in 1906, but one of its four predecessor institutions.

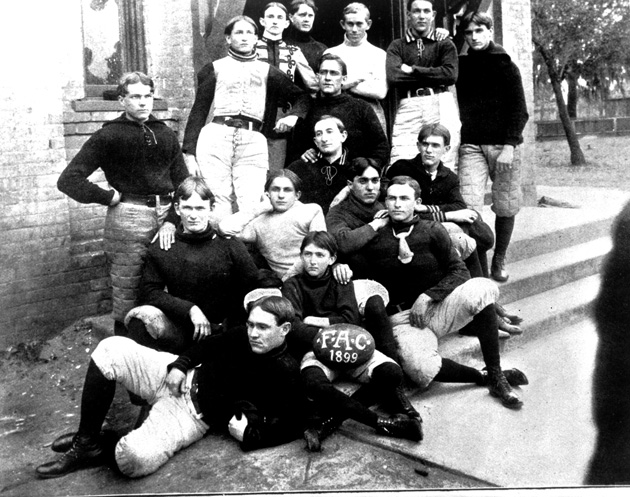
1899 Florida Agricultural College football team.

The college's team was first organized in 1899, but they only played intramural games until 1901. The team played the first intercollegiate football game in the state of Florida against the Stetson Hatters in Jacksonville as part of the State Fair. Stetson won 6–0, after a sure FAC score was obstructed by a tree stump (although it is said that a policeman on a horse got in the way of Stetson scoring an earlier touchdown).

== Schedule ==
Date	Time	Opponent	Site	Result	Source
November 22	3:00 p.m.	vs. Stetson	State Fairgrounds; Jacksonville, FL	L 0–6	

== See also ==
- List of the first college football game in each US state
