= 1901 Stetson Hatters football team =

American college football season

1901 Stetson Hatters football

State champion
- Conference: Independent
- Record: 1–0
- Head coach: Seaton Fleming (1st season)
- Captain: Thomas P. Conpropst

1901 Southern college football independents records
	Conf.			Overall
Team	W	L	T	W		L		T
Southwestern Louisiana Industrial		–		2	–	0	–	0
Stetson		–		1	–	0	–	0
Georgia Tech		–		4	–	0	–	1
Marshall		–		2	–	0	–	1
Kentucky University		–		7	–	1	–	1
VPI		–		6	–	1	–	0
Nashville		–		6	–	1	–	1
Virginia		–		8	–	2	–	0
Texas		–		8	–	2	–	1
Davidson		–		4	–	2	–	0
Baylor		–		5	–	3	–	0
Gallaudet		–		4	–	2	–	2
Sewanee		–		4	–	2	–	2
William & Mary		–		2	–	1	–	1
Navy		–		6	–	4	–	1
VMI		–		4	–	3	–	0
Oklahoma		–		3	–	2	–	0
West Virginia		–		3	–	2	–	0
Delaware		–		5	–	4	–	0
Georgetown		–		3	–	3	–	2
Kendall		–		2	–	2	–	0
Spring Hill		–		0	–	0	–	1
Wilmington Conference Academy		–		2	–	2	–	0
Oklahoma A&M		–		2	–	3	–	0
South Carolina		–		3	–	4	–	0
Arkansas		–		3	–	5	–	0
Add-Ran		–		1	–	2	–	1
Furman		–		1	–	2	–	1
Chilocco		–		2	–	5	–	0
North Carolina A&M		–		1	–	2	–	0
Texas A&M		–		1	–	4	–	0
Maryland		–		1	–	7	–	0
Richmond		–		1	–	7	–	0
Florida Agricultural		–		0	–	1	–	0
Louisiana Industrial		–		0	–	2	–	0
Tusculum		–				–

The 1901 Stetson Hatters football team represented the private Stetson College in the sport of American football during the 1901 college football season. The team's captain was Thomas P. Conpropst.

The team played the first intercollegiate football game in the state of Florida against the Florida Agricultural College in Jacksonville as part of the State Fair. Stetson won 6–0, after a sure FAC score was obstructed by a tree stump (although it is said that a policeman on a horse got in the way of Stetson scoring an earlier touchdown).

== Schedule ==
Date	Time	Opponent	Site	Result	Source
November 22	3:00 p.m.	vs. Florida Agricultural	State Fairgrounds; Jacksonville, FL	W 6–0	

== See also ==
- List of the first college football game in each US state
