= Fred Roberts (American football coach) =

American football player and coach (1875–1959)

Biographical details
- Born: November 16, 1875
- Died: July 28, 1959 (aged 83); Caldwell, Kansas, U.S.

Playing career
- 1899: Oklahoma
- 1900: Washburn
- 1901: Oklahoma
- 1903: Oklahoma
- Position: Halfback

Coaching career (HC unless noted)
- 1901: Oklahoma

Head coaching record
- Overall: 3–2

Fred W. Roberts (November 16, 1875 – July 28, 1959) was an American college football player and coach from Wellington, Kansas. He served as the University of Oklahoma's third head football coach. Roberts played for the Oklahoma Sooners in 1899, before transferring to Washburn University to play for Bennie Owen. He returned to coach Oklahoma during the 1901 season and led the team to a 3–2 record. He quit after that first year to farm, but he was always ready to appear at a big game if the team needed a halfback.

Roberts died at his home in Caldwell, Kansas on July 28, 1959, at the age of 83.

== Head coaching record ==
Year	Team	Overall	Bowl/playoffs
Oklahoma Sooners (Independent) (1901)
1901	Oklahoma	3–2	
Oklahoma:		3–2	
Total:		3–2	
