= A. B. Morrison Jr. =

American athlete and coach (1878–1967)

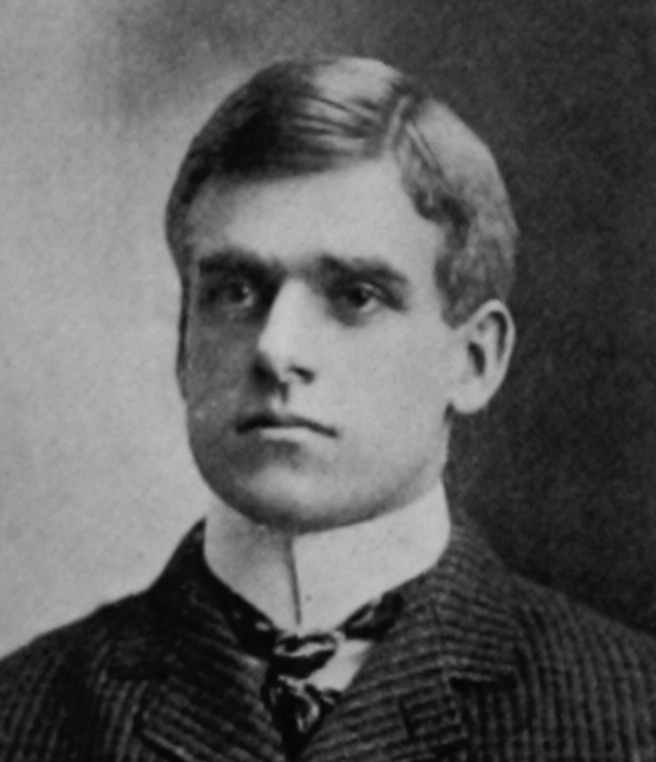
- Morrison pictured in the 1901 Class Book, Cornell University

Biographical details
- Born: June 4, 1878; Geneva, New York, U.S.
- Died: June 15, 1967 (aged 89); Dade County, Florida, U.S.

Playing career

Football
- ?: Hobart
- 1898–1900: Cornell
- Position: Halfback

Coaching career (HC unless noted)

Football
- 1901: VPI
- 1902: Cornell (assistant)

Baseball
- 1900–1901: VPI

Head coaching record
- Overall: 6–1 (football)

Archibald Bostwick Morrison Jr. (June 4, 1878 – June 15, 1967) was an American football and basketball player and coach of football and baseball. He served as the head football coach at Virginia Agricultural and Mechanical College and Polytechnic Institute (VPI)—now known as Virginia Tech—for one season in 1901, compiling a record of 6–1.

== Playing career ==
Before coaching, Morrison played halfback as an undergraduate at Cornell University for three seasons and also captained the basketball team in his senior year.

== Coaching career ==
=== VPI ===
The 1901 season was the most successful season for the program up to that time, and would continue to hold that mark until 1909 under head coach Branch Bocock, who tied that mark that year and later would improve the season win/loss percentage in the 1913 season. The season included victories over Clemson and Georgetown. The team's only defeat came from Virginia on October 26, 1901, by a score of 0–16. This was the only game of the season that the Hokies did not score.

=== Assistant coaching ===
After coaching at VPI for one year, he returned to Cornell as an assistant coach in 1902.

== Late life ==
Morrison enter a career in municipal bonds in 1915. In 1931, he moved from Detroit, Michigan to Coral Gables, Florida, where he opened A. B. Morrison & Co. Morrison died on June 15, 1967.

== Head coaching record ==
=== Football ===
Year	Team	Overall	Conference	Standing	Bowl/playoffs
VPI (Independent) (1901)
1901	VPI	6–1			
VPI:		6–1			
Total:		6–1			
