= 1901 Oklahoma Sooners football team =

American college football season

1901 Oklahoma Sooners football
- Conference: Independent
- Record: 3–2
- Head coach: Fred Roberts (1st season)
- Captain: Ray Crowe

1901 Southern college football independents records
	Conf.			Overall
Team	W	L	T	W		L		T
Southwestern Louisiana Industrial		–		2	–	0	–	0
Stetson		–		1	–	0	–	0
Georgia Tech		–		4	–	0	–	1
Marshall		–		2	–	0	–	1
Kentucky University		–		7	–	1	–	1
VPI		–		6	–	1	–	0
Nashville		–		6	–	1	–	1
Virginia		–		8	–	2	–	0
Texas		–		8	–	2	–	1
Davidson		–		4	–	2	–	0
Baylor		–		5	–	3	–	0
Gallaudet		–		4	–	2	–	2
Sewanee		–		4	–	2	–	2
William & Mary		–		2	–	1	–	1
Navy		–		6	–	4	–	1
VMI		–		4	–	3	–	0
Oklahoma		–		3	–	2	–	0
West Virginia		–		3	–	2	–	0
Delaware		–		5	–	4	–	0
Georgetown		–		3	–	3	–	2
Kendall		–		2	–	2	–	0
Spring Hill		–		0	–	0	–	1
Wilmington Conference Academy		–		2	–	2	–	0
Oklahoma A&M		–		2	–	3	–	0
South Carolina		–		3	–	4	–	0
Arkansas		–		3	–	5	–	0
Add-Ran		–		1	–	2	–	1
Furman		–		1	–	2	–	1
Chilocco		–		2	–	5	–	0
North Carolina A&M		–		1	–	2	–	0
Texas A&M		–		1	–	4	–	0
Maryland		–		1	–	7	–	0
Richmond		–		1	–	7	–	0
Florida Agricultural		–		0	–	1	–	0
Louisiana Industrial		–		0	–	2	–	0
Tusculum		–				–

The 1901 Oklahoma Sooners football team was an American football team that represented the University of Oklahoma as an independent during the 1901 college football season. In its first year under head coach Fred Roberts, the team compiled a 3–2 record and outscored their opponents by a combined total of 93 to 29.

The team played two games against the Texas Longhorns, the second and third meetings in the rivalry that later became known as the Red River Showdown.

== Schedule ==
Date	Time	Opponent	Site	Result	Source
October 19		at Texas	Varsity Athletic Field; Austin, TX (rivalry)	L 6–12	
October 21		at Baylor	Waco, TX	W 17–6	
November 1	3:25 p.m.	Kingfisher	University grounds; Norman, Oklahoma Territory	W 28–6	
November 8		Fairmount	University grounds; Norman, Oklahoma Territory	W 42–0	
November 25		Texas	University grounds; Norman, Oklahoma Territory	L 0–11	
