= 1901 Baylor football team =

American college football season

1901 Baylor football
- Conference: Independent
- Record: 5–3
- Head coach: W. R. Ritchie (1st season)
- Captain: Homer B. "Buck" Fisher

1901 Southern college football independents records
	Conf.			Overall
Team	W	L	T	W		L		T
Southwestern Louisiana Industrial		–		2	–	0	–	0
Stetson		–		1	–	0	–	0
Georgia Tech		–		4	–	0	–	1
Marshall		–		2	–	0	–	1
Kentucky University		–		7	–	1	–	1
VPI		–		6	–	1	–	0
Nashville		–		6	–	1	–	1
Virginia		–		8	–	2	–	0
Texas		–		8	–	2	–	1
Davidson		–		4	–	2	–	0
Baylor		–		5	–	3	–	0
Gallaudet		–		4	–	2	–	2
Sewanee		–		4	–	2	–	2
William & Mary		–		2	–	1	–	1
Navy		–		6	–	4	–	1
VMI		–		4	–	3	–	0
Oklahoma		–		3	–	2	–	0
West Virginia		–		3	–	2	–	0
Delaware		–		5	–	4	–	0
Georgetown		–		3	–	3	–	2
Kendall		–		2	–	2	–	0
Spring Hill		–		0	–	0	–	1
Wilmington Conference Academy		–		2	–	2	–	0
Oklahoma A&M		–		2	–	3	–	0
South Carolina		–		3	–	4	–	0
Arkansas		–		3	–	5	–	0
Add-Ran		–		1	–	2	–	1
Furman		–		1	–	2	–	1
Chilocco		–		2	–	5	–	0
North Carolina A&M		–		1	–	2	–	0
Texas A&M		–		1	–	4	–	0
Maryland		–		1	–	7	–	0
Richmond		–		1	–	7	–	0
Florida Agricultural		–		0	–	1	–	0
Louisiana Industrial		–		0	–	2	–	0
Tusculum		–				–

The 1901 Baylor football team was an American football team that represented Baylor University as an independent during the 1901 college football season. In its first season under head coach W. R. Ritchie the team compiled a 5–3 record and played its home games in Waco, Texas. During the 1901 season, Baylor played its first games in what became rivalries with the Texas Longhorns and TCU Horned Frogs. TCU, known as Add–Ran University until 1902, was located in Waco from 1895 to 1910 and was one of Baylor's greatest football rivals until the dissolution of the Southwest Conference in 1995.

== Schedule ==
Date	Time	Opponent	Site	Result	Attendance	Source
October 5	4:00 p.m.	St. Edward's	Waco, TX	W 23–0		
October 11		vs. Texas A&M	State Fair Grounds field; Dallas, TX (rivalry)	W 17–6	4,000	
October 21	4:00 p.m.	Oklahoma	Waco, TX	L 6–17		
October 29		Texas	Waco, TX (rivalry)	L 0–23		
November 5	4:10 p.m.	vs. Texas A&M	Fair Grounds; Bryan, TX	L 0–6		
November 23		Add-Ran	Baylor gridiron; Waco, TX (rivalry)	W 39–0		
November 28		Texas A&M	Waco, TX	W 47–0		
		Add-Ran	Waco, TX	W 42–9		

== Season summary ==
On July 18, Baylor announced that it had found its next coach: W.J. Ritchie, from Athens, Georgia.

=== Oct. 11 vs. Texas A&M ===
Playing at the State Fair of Texas, Baylor and A&M drew a crowd of 4,000 spectators. The game was delayed by an argument between the teams over the eligibility of a player. A verbal agreement had been made to allow only students who had attended classes at the respective university at least ten days prior, but Schultz, a fullback for A&M, had not attended until two to three days prior, allegedly due to ill parents. Not believing the excuse, Baylor eventually prevailed in both the argument and the game, which ended in another squabble about the timekeepers' timekeeping.

=== Nov. 5 vs. Texas A&M ===
Meeting for a second time in the season, Baylor and A&M celebrated the first annual Central Texas Fair, located in Bryan, Texas, on its College Day with a football game in which A&M handily defeated the Baylor team.

=== Nov. 23 vs. Add-Ran ===
Competing for the local championship, Baylor clearly outclassed their opponents and led in the first half by a comfortable 23–0 margin.

=== Nov. 28 vs. Texas A&M ===
In what appeared to be the state's last collegiate football game day of the season, the game was called "the most interesting ever played on a Waco gridiron, because of the sensational clean and fast plays." Having split the first two meetings of the season, both Baylor and the A.&M.'s were seeking the tiebreaking victory; A&M mistakenly contracted to play both the University of Texas and Baylor on the same day, and so split the team. A&M brought a large delegation of fans with its team by train but was disappointed with a 47-point shutout loss. The Baylor boys spent the evening at a reception at the Young Ladies' Boarding Hall.
