= Ed Tutwiler =

American football player and coach (1880–1932)

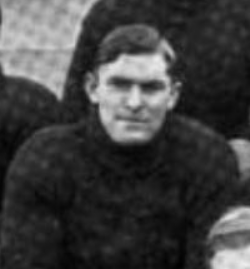
- Tutwiler cropped from 1901 Virginia team picture

Biographical details
- Born: September 13, 1880; Balcony Falls, Virginia, U.S.
- Died: September 3, 1932 (aged 51); Montgomery, Alabama, U.S.

Playing career
- 1897–1898: Alabama
- 1900–1901: Virginia
- Position: Quarterback

Coaching career (HC unless noted)
- 1902: Central University

Accomplishments and honors

Awards
- All-Southern (1901)

Edward Magruder "Tut" Tutwiler Jr. (September 13, 1880 – September 3, 1932) was an American college football player and coach. He played quarterback at the University of Alabama and the University of Virginia.

== Early years ==
Edward M. Tutwiler, Jr was born on September 13, 1880, in Balcony Falls, Virginia, to Maj. Edward Magruder Tutwiler, a wealthy Birmingham philanthropist, and Mary Fendley Jeffray. His father served in the American Civil War, participating in the Battle of New Market as one of the VMI cadets.

== College ==
=== University of Alabama ===
Tutwiler was from Birmingham, Alabama, at the time of his enrolling at the University of Alabama. He transferred from Alabama to Virginia. One account reads "Ed Tutwiler is one of the greatest stars that football in the south ever produced. He was a graduate of the University in the class of '98, and afterwards went to the University of Virginia. He was considered the pluckiest quarterback in the south, and was noted for head work and generalship."

=== University of Virginia ===
==== 1901 ====
Tutwiler was selected All-Southern in 1901. Fuzzy Woodruff gave Virginia the mythical southern championship regardless of conference affiliation for 1901.

== Death ==
Tutwiler was found dead in pajamas in the bedroom of his Montgomery, Alabama, home on September 3, 1932, with a wound in his right temple. A pistol lay near by; the family noted the apparent suicide had been preceded by a recent despondence because of ill health.
