= John McKee (American football) =

American football coach and physician (1877–1950)

Biographical details
- Born: July 16, 1877; Raleigh, North Carolina, U.S.
- Died: April 22, 1950 (aged 72); Morganton, North Carolina, U.S.

Playing career
- 1897–1898: North Carolina
- Position: Tackle

Coaching career (HC unless noted)
- 1899–1900: North Carolina A&M
- 1901: Georgia Tech
- 1901: Georgia (assistant)

Head coaching record
- Overall: 6–8–3

John Sasser McKee (July 16, 1877 – April 22, 1950) was an American college football coach and physician. He served as the head football coach at North Carolina College of Agriculture and Mechanic Arts—now known as North Carolina State University from 1899 to 1900 and Georgia Tech in 1901, compiling a career coaching record of 6–8–3.

McKee was born and grew up in Raleigh, North Carolina, the son of Dr. James McKee and Mildred Sasser McKee. He received his secondary education at the Raleigh Male Academy. McKee enrolled at the University of North Carolina and played on the North Carolina Tar Heels football team from 1897 to 1898 as tackle. While at the school, he was also a member of the Zeta Psi fraternity.

After graduation, McKee coached at North Carolina A&M from 1899 to 1900, leading his teams to record of 2–8–2 two seasons. In 1901, he coached at Georgia Tech, guiding the 1901 Georgia Tech football team to a record of 4–0–1. After Georgia Tech's season ended, McKee joined the staff of the 1901 Georgia Bulldogs football team in their preparation against Auburn. McKee sued the Georgia Tech in June 1902 for breach of contract for the amount of $500.

Following his football coaching career, he received a medical degree from the University of Maryland School of Medicine in 1907, and entered into medical practice in his hometown of Raleigh. During World War I, McKee achieved the rank of major in the American Expeditionary Forces as a field surgeon with the 1st Gas Regiment. McKee returned to Raleigh after the war where he was the city physician until 1948. “Dr. John” was very well known throughout the state of North Carolina for his gruff but compassionate sense of humor and his propensity to curse. He loved to drive a T-Model Ford automobile. When Ford discontinued the car, McKee refused to drive any longer despite the fact he was issued a new Buick every year by the Raleigh city fathers, and police officers and firemen took him on his rounds every morning. McKee died in Morganton, North Carolina on April 22, 1950, at the home of his son, Dr. John S. McKee Jr., superintendent of the Broughton State Mental Hospital.

== Head coaching record ==
Year	Team	Overall	Conference	Standing	Bowl/playoffs
North Carolina A&M Aggies (Independent) (1899–1900)
1899	North Carolina A&M	1–3–2			
1900	North Carolina A&M	1–5			
North Carolina A&M:		2–8–2			
Georgia Tech (Independent) (1901)
1901	Georgia Tech	4–0–1			
Georgia Tech:		4–0–1			
Total:		6–8–3			
