= Garnett Nelson =

American football coach (1873–1930)

Biographical details
- Born: June 13, 1873; Fauquier County, Virginia, U.S.
- Died: March 30, 1930 (aged 56); Richmond, Virginia, U.S.

Playing career

Baseball
- c. 1895: Virginia
- Position: Pitcher

Coaching career (HC unless noted)

Football
- 1901: Richmond

Head coaching record
- Overall: 1–7

John Peyton Garnett Nelson (June 13, 1873 – March 30, 1930) was an American college football coach and physician. He served as the head football coach at Richmond College—now known as the University of Richmond—in Richmond, Virginia, for one season, in 1901, compiling a record of 1–7.

A native of Richmond, Nelson attended the University of Virginia, where he played college baseball as a pitcher before graduating in 1895. He was hired to teach at Episcopal High School in Alexandria, Virginia in 1896. He also taught at St. Alban's School for Boys in Radford, Virginia and McGuire's University School in Richmond. Nelson graduated in 1900 from the Medical College of Virginia—now known as VCU School of Medicine—and was appointed a resident physician at St Luke's Hospital in Richmond.

Nelson died of bladder cancer, on March 30, 1930, at St Luke's Hospital. He was buried in Hollywood Cemetery.

== Head coaching record ==
Year	Team	Overall	Conference	Standing	Bowl/playoffs
Richmond Spiders (Independent) (1901)
1901	Richmond	1–7			
Richmond:		1–7			
Total:		1–7			
