= 1901 Texas Longhorns football team =

American college football season

1901 Texas Longhorns football
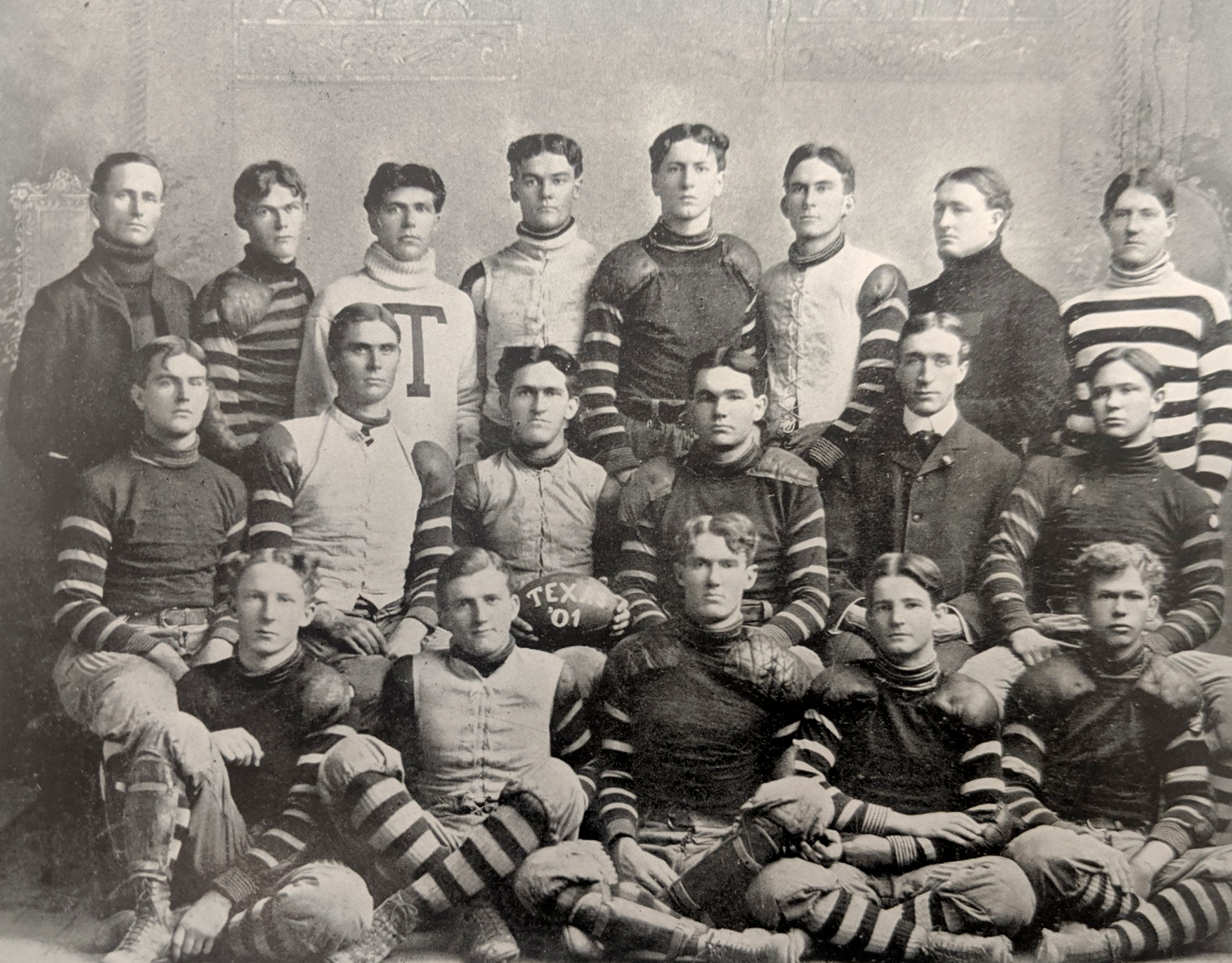
- Conference: Southern Intercollegiate Athletic Association
- Record: 8–2–1 (0-0 SIAA)
- Head coach: Samuel Huston Thompson (2nd season)
- Captain: Mark McMahon
- Home stadium: Varsity Athletic Field

1901 Southern Intercollegiate Athletic Association football standings
	Conf.					Overall
Team	W		L		T	W		L		T
Vanderbilt $	4	–	0	–	0	6	–	1	–	1
Clemson	2	–	0	–	1	3	–	1	–	1
LSU	2	–	1	–	0	5	–	1	–	0
North Carolina	2	–	1	–	0	7	–	2	–	0
Tulane	2	–	1	–	0	4	–	2	–	0
Alabama	2	–	1	–	2	2	–	1	–	2
Auburn	2	–	2	–	1	2	–	3	–	1
Tennessee	1	–	1	–	2	3	–	3	–	2
Mississippi A&M	1	–	2	–	0	2	–	2	–	1
Georgia	0	–	3	–	2	1	–	5	–	2
Cumberland (TN)	0	–	1	–	0	0	–	3	–	0
Kentucky State	0	–	2	–	0	2	–	6	–	1
Ole Miss	0	–	4	–	0	2	–	4	–	0
Texas	0	–	0	–	0	8	–	2	–	1
$ – Conference champion

The 1901 Texas 'Varsity football team represented The University of Texas (now known as the University of Texas at Austin Longhorns) as a member of the SIAA during the 1901 college football season. In its second year under head coach Samuel Huston Thompson, the team compiled an 8–2–1 record, shut out seven opponents, and outscored opponents by a collective total of 153 to 71. These wins included the first ever UT-A&M game held on Thanksgiving day. The team played its home games at Varsity Athletic Field on the school's campus in Austin, Texas.

== Schedule ==
Date	Opponent	Site	Result	Attendance	Source
October 7	Houston Athletic Association*	Varsity Athletic Field; Austin, TX	W 32–0		
October 12	vs. Nashville*	Dallas Fair Grounds; Dallas, TX	T 5–5		
October 19	Oklahoma*	Varsity Athletic Field; Austin, TX (rivalry)	W 12–6		
October 26	vs. Texas A&M*	San Antonio, TX (rivalry)	W 17–0		
October 29	at Baylor*	Waco, TX (rivalry)	W 23–0		
November 9	Dallas Athletic Club*	Varsity Athletic Field; Austin, TX	W 10–0		
November 16	at Missouri*	Rollins Field; Columbia, MO	W 11–0		
November 20	at Kirksville Osteopaths*	Kirksville, MO	L 0–48		
November 23	at Kansas*	McCook Field; Lawrence, KS	L 0–12	600	
November 25	at Oklahoma*	Normal grounds; Norman, Oklahoma Territory (rivalry)	W 11–0		
November 28	Texas A&M*	Varsity Athletic Field; Austin, TX (rivalry)	W 34–0		
*Non-conference game

== Personnel ==
Player	Position	Letter #
Walter Hyde	Left End	1st
I.V. Duncan	Left End	2nd
T. Harris James	Left Tackle	1st
D.M. Prendergrast	Left Guard	1st
Osco McQuaters	Center	1st
W.C. Gathins	Right Guard	1st
Mark McMahon	Right Tackle	4th
J. Leonard Brown	Right End	2nd
Rembert Watson	Quarterback	1st
H.B. Ruckman	Left Halfback	1st
W. McMahon	Left Halfback	2nd
S.F. Leslie	Right Halfback	2nd
Ed Bewley	Fullback	2nd
Walter W. Hyde	Fullback	1st

Substitutes

Player	Position	Letter #
Randon Porter	Quarterback	1st
N.J. Marshall	Guard	1st
Clinton Brown	Halfback	1st
J.L. Mills	End	1st
Victor Kellar	Center	1st
