= 1901 Southern Intercollegiate Athletic Association football season =

- League: NCAA
- Sport: College football
- Duration: September 28, 1901 through December 5, 1901
- Teams: 14

Regular Season
- Season champions: Vanderbilt

Football seasons
- ← 1900 1902 →

1901 Southern Intercollegiate Athletic Association football standings
| | Conf. | | | | | Overall |
| Team | W | | L | | T | W | | L | | T |
|---|---|---|---|---|---|---|---|---|---|---|
| Vanderbilt $ | 4 | – | 0 | – | 0 | 6 | – | 1 | – | 1 |
| Clemson | 2 | – | 0 | – | 1 | 3 | – | 1 | – | 1 |
| LSU | 2 | – | 1 | – | 0 | 5 | – | 1 | – | 0 |
| North Carolina | 2 | – | 1 | – | 0 | 7 | – | 2 | – | 0 |
| Tulane | 2 | – | 1 | – | 0 | 4 | – | 2 | – | 0 |
| Alabama | 2 | – | 1 | – | 2 | 2 | – | 1 | – | 2 |
| Auburn | 2 | – | 2 | – | 1 | 2 | – | 3 | – | 1 |
| Tennessee | 1 | – | 1 | – | 2 | 3 | – | 3 | – | 2 |
| Mississippi A&M | 1 | – | 2 | – | 0 | 2 | – | 2 | – | 1 |
| Georgia | 0 | – | 3 | – | 2 | 1 | – | 5 | – | 2 |
| Cumberland (TN) | 0 | – | 1 | – | 0 | 0 | – | 3 | – | 0 |
| Kentucky State | 0 | – | 2 | – | 0 | 2 | – | 6 | – | 1 |
| Ole Miss | 0 | – | 4 | – | 0 | 2 | – | 4 | – | 0 |
| Texas | 0 | – | 0 | – | 0 | 8 | – | 2 | – | 1 |
$ – Conference champion

The 1901 Southern Intercollegiate Athletic Association football season was the college football games played by the member schools of the Southern Intercollegiate Athletic Association as part of the 1901 college football season. The season began on September 28.

Amidst charges of professionalism, Georgia Tech and Nashville were blacklisted. The 1901 game of LSU versus Tulane eventually ended up as a forfeiture. Tulane forfeited the game the November 16 due to a ruling from the SIAA. The 1901 edition of the Battle for the Flag against LSU was originally a 22-0 victory for Tulane. It was later forfeited after a petition to the SIAA, and was recorded as a 0-11 loss for Tulane. After the game, LSU protested to the Southern Intercollegiate Athletic Association, and alleged that Tulane had used a professional player during the game. Several months later, the SIAA ruled the game an 11-0 forfeit in favor of LSU.

The 1901 team was likely the best football team in Nashville's history. Coached by Charley Moran, though they lost to southern power Vanderbilt, they "mopped up with about everything else."

== Season overview ==
=== Results and team statistics ===
| Conf. Rank | Team | Head coach | Conf. record | Winning Pct. | Overall record | PPG | PAG |
|---|---|---|---|---|---|---|---|
| 1 | Vanderbilt | Billy Watkins | 4–0–0 | 1.000 | 6–1–1 | 22.3 | 1.5 |
| 2 | Clemson | John Heisman | 2–0–1 | .833 | 3–1–1 | 38.0 | 7.6 |
| 3 (tie) | LSU | W. S. Borland | 2–1–0 | .667 | 5–1–0 | | |
| 3 (tie) | North Carolina | Charles Jenkins | 2–1–0 | .667 | 7–2–0 | | |
| 3 (tie) | Tulane | H. T. Summersgill | 2–1–0 | .667 | 4–2–0 | | |
| 6 | Alabama | M. S. Harvey | 2–1–2 | .600 | 2–1–2 | | |
| 7 (tie) | Auburn | Billy Watkins | 2–2–1 | .500 | 2–3–1 | | |
| 7 (tie) | Tennessee | George Kelley | 1–1–2 | .500 | 3–3–2 | | |
| 9 | Mississippi A&M | L. B. Harvey | 1–2–0 | .333 | 2–2–1 | | |
| 10 | Georgia | E. E. Jones | 0–3–2 | .250 | 1–5–2 | | |
| 11 (tie) | Cumberland | J. S. Kuykendall | 0–1–0 | .000 | 0–1–0 | | |
| 11 (tie) | Kentucky State | W. H. Kiler | 0–2–0 | .000 | 2–6–1 | | |
| 11 (tie) | Mississippi | William Shibley | 0–4–0 | .000 | 2–4–0 | | |
| – | Texas | S. H. Thompson | 0–0–0 | – | 8–2–1 | | |

Key

PPG = Average of points scored per game
PAG = Average of points allowed per game

=== Regular season ===
Index to colors and formatting
Non-conference matchup; SIAA member won
Non-conference matchup; SIAA member lost
Non-conference matchup; tie
Conference matchup

SIAA teams in bold.

==== Week One ====
| Date | Visiting team | Home team | Site | Result | Attendance | Reference |
|---|---|---|---|---|---|---|
| October 5 | **Kentucky State** | **Vanderbilt** | Dudley Field • Nashville, TN | **VAN** 22–0 | | |
| October 5 | Guilford | **Clemson** | Bowman Field • Calhoun, SC | **W** 122–0 | | |
| October 5 | Mooney School | **Cumberland** | Lebanon, TN | **L** 10–12 | | |
| October 7 | Houston Athletic Association | **Texas** | Varsity Athletic Field • Austin, TX | **W** 32–0 | | |

==== Week Two ====
| Date | Visiting team | Home team | Site | Result | Attendance | Reference |
|---|---|---|---|---|---|---|
| October 11 | **Cumberland** | Southwestern Presbyterian | Clarksville, TN | **L** 0–5 | | |
| October 12 | Cincinnati | **Kentucky State** | Lexington, KY | **T** 0–0 | | |
| October 12 | Oak Ridge Military Academy | **North Carolina** | Campus Athletic Field • Chapel Hill, NC | **W** 28–0 | | |
| October 12 | South Carolina | **Georgia** | Augusta Baseball Park • Augusta, GA | **W** 10–5 | | |
| October 12 | King | **Tennessee** | Chilhowee Park • Knoxville, TN | **W** 8–0 | | |
| October 12 | Central University | **Vanderbilt** | Dudley Field • Nashville, TN | **W** 25–0 | | |
| October 12 | Nashville | **Texas** | Dallas Fair Grounds • Dallas, TX | **T** 5–5 | | |
| October 16 | North Carolina A&M | **North Carolina** | Campus Athletic Field • Chapel Hill, NC | **W** 42–0 | | |
| October 16 | **Tulane** | Meridian Athletic Club | Meridian, MS | **W** 15–0 | | |

==== Week Three ====
| Date | Visiting team | Home team | Site | Result | Attendance | Reference |
|---|---|---|---|---|---|---|
| October 19 | Memphis University School | **Ole Miss** | Oxford, MS | **W** 6–0 | | |
| October 19 | **Kentucky State** | Georgetown (KY) | Georgetown, KY | **W** 17–0 | | |
| October 19 | Guilford | **North Carolina** | Campus Athletic Field • Chapel Hill, NC | **W** 42–0 | | |
| October 19 | Oklahoma | **Texas** | Varsity Athletic Field • Austin, TX | **W** 12–6 | | |
| October 19 | Nashville | **Auburn** | West End Park • Birmingham, AL | **L** 5–23 | | |
| October 19 | **Clemson** | **Tennessee** | Chilhowee Park • Knoxville, TN | **T** 6–6 | | |
| October 19 | **Georgia** | **Vanderbilt** | Dudley Field • Nashville, TN | **VAN** 47–0 | | |
| October 21 | **Georgia** | Sewanee | Hardee Field • Sewanee, TN | **L** 0–47 | | |
| October 25 | **Cumberland** | Sewanee | Hardee Field • Sewanee, TN | **L** 5–44 | | |

==== Week Four ====
| Date | Visiting team | Home team | Site | Result | Attendance | Reference |
|---|---|---|---|---|---|---|
| October 26 | **Ole Miiss** | **Alabama** | The Quad • Tuscaloosa, AL | **ALA** 41–0 | | |
| October 26 | **Vanderbilt** | **Auburn** | Riverside Park • Montgomery, AL | **VAN** 41–0 | | |
| October 26 | **Mississippi A&M** | Christian Brothers | Memphis, TN | **T** 0–0 | | |
| October 26 | **North Carolina** | Davidson | Latta Park • Charlotte, NC | **W** 6–0 | | |
| October 26 | **Clemson** | **Georgia** | Herty Field • Athens, GA | **CLEM** 28–0 | | |
| October 26 | Kentucky University | **Kentucky State** | Lexington, KY | **L** 0–27 | | |
| October 26 | Texas A&M | **Texas** | San Antonio, TX | **W** 17–0 | | |
| October 26 | **Tennessee** | Nashville | Peabody Field • Nashville, TN | **L** 5–16 | | |
| October 26 | **Tulane** | Mobile YMCA | Mobile, AL | **L** 0–2 | | |
| October 28 | **LSU** | Louisiana Industrial | Ruston, LA | **W** 57–0 | | |
| October 28 | **Ole Miss** | **Mississippi A&M** | Starkville Fairgrounds • Starkville, MS | **MSA&M** 17–0 | | |
| October 29 | **Texas** | Baylor | Waco, TX | **W** 23–0 | | |
| October 31 | VPI | **Clemson** | Columbia, SC | **L** 11–17 | | |

==== Week Five ====
| Date | Visiting team | Home team | Site | Result | Attendance | Reference |
|---|---|---|---|---|---|---|
| November 2 | **Mississippi A&M** | Meridian Athletic Association | Meridian, MS | **W** 11–5 | | |
| November 2 | Southwestern Baptist | **Ole Miss** | Oxford, MS | **W** 17–0 | | |
| November 2 | New Orleans YMCA | **Tulane** | Tulane Athletic Field • New Orleans, LA | **W** 23–0 | | |
| November 2 | Kentucky University | **Tennessee** | Chilhowee Park • Knoxville, TN | **L** 0–6 | | |
| November 2 | **Vanderbilt** | Washington University | Athletic Park • St. Louis, MO | **L** 11–12 | | |
| November 2 | **Kentucky State** | Avondale Athletic Club | Avondale Field • Cincinnati, OH | **L** 6–17 | | |
| November 2 | **North Carolina** | **Georgia** | Brisbine Park • Atlanta, GA | **UNC** 27–0 | | |
| November 4 | **North Carolina** | **Auburn** | Drill Field • Auburn, AL | **UNC** 10–0 | | |
| November 7 | **Ole Miss** | **LSU** | State Field • Baton Rouge, LA | **LSU** 46–0 | | |

==== Week Six ====
| Date | Visiting team | Home team | Site | Result | Attendance | Reference |
|---|---|---|---|---|---|---|
| November 9 | Dallas A. C. | **Texas** | Varsity Athletic Field • Austin, TX | **W** 12–0 | | |
| November 9 | **Georgia** | **Alabama** | Highland Park • Montgomery, AL | **T** 0–0 | | |
| November 9 | **Mississippi A&M** | **Tulane** | Tulane Athletic Field • New Orleans, LA | **TUL** 24–6 | | |
| November 9 | **Tennessee** | **Vanderbilt** | Dudley Field • Nashville, TN | **VAN** 22–0 | | |
| November 9 | **Kentucky State** | Louisville YMCA | League Park • Louisville, KY | **L** 0–11 | | |
| November 15 | **Auburn** | **Alabama** | The Quad • Tuscaloosa, AL | **AUB** 17–0 | | |

==== Week Seven ====
| Date | Visiting team | Home team | Site | Result | Attendance | Reference |
|---|---|---|---|---|---|---|
| November 15 | Davidson | **Georgia** | Herty Field • Athens, GA | **L** 6–16 | | |
| November 16 | Central University | **Kentucky State** | Lexington, KY | **L** 0–5 | | |
| November 16 | **Mississippi A&M** | **Alabama** | The Quad • Tuscaloosa, AL | **ALA** 45–0 | | |
| November 16 | **Texas** | Missouri | Rollins Field • Columbia, MO | **W** 11–0 | | |
| November 16 | **LSU** | **Tulane** | Tulane Athletic Field • New Orleans, LA | **LSU** 11–0 | 5,000 | |
| November 16 | Georgetown (KY) | **Tennessee** | Chilhowee Park • Knoxville, TN | **W** 12–0 | | |
| November 16 | Sewanee | **Vanderbilt** | Dudley Field • Nashville, TN | **T** 0–0 | | |
| November 19 | **North Carolina** | North Carolina A&M | State Fairgrounds • Raleigh, NC | **W** 30–0 | | |
| November 19 | **Texas** | Kirksville Osteopaths | Kirksville, MO | **L** 0–48 | | |
| November 20 | **Auburn** | **LSU** | State Field • Baton Rouge, LA | **AUB** 28–0 | | |

==== Week Eight ====
| Date | Time | Visiting team | Home team | Site | Result | Attendance | Reference |
|---|---|---|---|---|---|---|---|
| November 23 | | **North Carolina** | Virginia | Leagur Park • Norfolk, VA | **L** 6–23 | 5,000 | |
| November 23 | | **Texas** | Kansas | McCook Field • Lawrence, KS | **L** 0–12 | 600 | |
| November 23 | | **Kentucky State** | **Tennessee** | Chilhowee Park • Knoxville, TN | **TENN** 5–0 | | |
| November 25 | | **Texas** | Oklahoma | Normal grounds • Norman, OK | **W** 11–0 | | |
| November 28 | | Cincinnati JV | **Kentucky State** | Lexington, KY | **W** 16–0 | | |
| November 28 | | **Tennessee** | **Alabama** | West End Park • Birmingham, AL | **T** 6–6 | | |
| November 28 | | **Auburn** | **Georgia** | Piedmont Park • Atlanta, GA | **T** 0–0 | | |
| November 28 | | New Orleans YMCA | **LSU** | State Field • Baton Rouge, LA | **W** 38–0 | | |
| November 28 | | Texas A&M | **Texas** | Varsity Athletic Field • Austin, TX | **W** 32–0 | | |
| November 28 | | **Clemson** | **North Carolina** | Latta Park • Charlotte, NC | **CLEM** 22–10 | | |
| November 28 | | **Ole Miss** | **Tulane** | Tulane Athletic Field • New Orleans, LA | **TUL** 25–11 | | |
| November 28 | 2:00 p. m. | Nashville | **Vanderbilt** | Dudley Field • Nashville, TN | **VAN** 10–0 | 4,000 | |

==== Week Nine ====
| Date | Visiting team | Home team | Site | Result | Attendance | Reference |
|---|---|---|---|---|---|---|
| December 5 | Arkansas | **LSU** | State Field • Baton Rouge, LA | **W** 15–0 | | |

== Awards and honors ==
=== All-Southerns ===
- HB - Ormond Simkins, Sewanee (O)
