= List of Ole Miss Rebels football seasons =

This is a complete list of Ole Miss Rebels football seasons.

== Seasons ==
Year	Team	Overall	Conference	Standing	Bowl/playoffs	Coaches^{#}	AP^{°}
Alexander Bondurant (Independent) (1893)
1893	Ole Miss	4–1					
J. W. S. Rhea & Charles Dow Clark (Independent) (1894)
1894	Ole Miss	6–1					
H. L. Fairbanks (Independent) (1895)
1895	Ole Miss	2–1					
John W. Hollister (Independent) (1896)
1896	Ole Miss	1–2					
1897	No team						
T. G. Scarbrough (Independent) (1898)
1898	Ole Miss	1–1					
W. H. Lyon (Southern Intercollegiate Athletic Association) (1899)
1899	Ole Miss	3–4	2–3	11th			
Z. N. Estes (Southern Intercollegiate Athletic Association) (1900)
1900	Ole Miss	0–3	0–3	T–14th			
William Shibley (Southern Intercollegiate Athletic Association) (1901)
1901	Ole Miss	2–4	0–4	15th			
Daniel S. Martin (Southern Intercollegiate Athletic Association) (1902)
1902	Ole Miss	4–3	3–3	8th			
M. S. Harvey (Southern Intercollegiate Athletic Association) (1903–1904)
1903	Ole Miss	2–1–1	1–1–1	8th			
1904	Ole Miss	4–3	2–3	10th			
Southern Intercollegiate Athletic Association (1905)
1905	Ole Miss	0–2	0–2	T–13th			
Thomas S. Hammond (Southern Intercollegiate Athletic Association) (1906)
1906	Ole Miss	4–2	3–2	6th			
Frank A. Mason (Southern Intercollegiate Athletic Association) (1907)
1907	Ole Miss	0–6	0–5	15th			
Frank Kyle (Southern Intercollegiate Athletic Association) (1908)
1908	Ole Miss	3–5	1–2	9th			
Nathan Stauffer (Southern Intercollegiate Athletic Association) (1909–1911)
1909	Ole Miss	4–3–2	2–3–1	8th			
1910	Ole Miss	7–1	2–1	6th			
1911	Ole Miss	6–3	2–2	8th			
Leo DeTray (Southern Intercollegiate Athletic Association) (1912)
1912	Ole Miss	5–3	2–2	11th			
William L. Driver (Southern Intercollegiate Athletic Association) (1913–1914)
1913	Ole Miss	6–3–1	0–0	(Note: The team was under suspension from the Southern Intercollegiate Athletic Association.)			
1914	Ole Miss	5–4–1 (Note: Arkansas claims Ole Miss used an ineligible player and considers this a forfeit.)	2–1–1	5th			
Fred A. Robins (Southern Intercollegiate Athletic Association) (1915–1916)
1915	Ole Miss	2–6	0–5	23rd			
1916	Ole Miss	3–6	0–6	26th			
Dudy Noble (Southern Intercollegiate Athletic Association) (1917–1918)
1917	Ole Miss	1–4–1	1–4	14th			
1918	Ole Miss	1–3	0–2	11th			
R. L. Sullivan (Southern Intercollegiate Athletic Association) (1919–1921)
1919	Ole Miss	4–4	1–4	T–14th			
1920	Ole Miss	4–3	0–2	T–22nd			
1921	Ole Miss	3–6	0–3	T–25th	L Bacardi		
Roland Cowell (Southern Conference) (1922–1923)
1922	Ole Miss	4–5–1	0–2	19th			
1923	Ole Miss	4–6	0–4	19th			
Chester S. Barnard (Southern Conference) (1924)
1924	Ole Miss	4–5	0–3	20th			
Homer Hazel (Southern Intercollegiate Athletic Association) (1925–1929)
1925	Ole Miss	5–5	0–4	T–20th			
1926	Ole Miss	5–4	2–2	13th			
1927	Ole Miss	5–3–1	3–2	7th			
1928	Ole Miss	5–4	3–3	10th			
1929	Ole Miss	1–6–2	0–4–2	19th			
Ed Walker (Southern Conference/Southeastern Conference) (1930–1937)
1930	Ole Miss	3–5–1	1–5	T–9th			
1931	Ole Miss	2–6–1	1–5	21st			
1932	Ole Miss	5–6	2–3	T–12th			
1933	Ole Miss	6–3–2	2–2–1	T–6th			
1934	Ole Miss	4–5–1	2–3–1	8th			
1935	Ole Miss	9–3	3–1	3rd	L Orange		
1936	Ole Miss	5–5–2	0–3–1	12th			
1937	Ole Miss	4–5–1	0–4	11th			
Harry Mehre (Southeastern Conference) (1938–1945)
1938	Ole Miss	9–2	3–2	4th			
1939	Ole Miss	7–2	2–2	T–5th			
1940	Ole Miss	9–2	3–1	3rd			
1941	Ole Miss	6–2–1	2–1–1	5th			17
1942	Ole Miss	2–7	0–5	T–11th			
1943	No team						
1944	Ole Miss	2–6	2–3	7th			
1945	Ole Miss	4–5	3–3	T–5th			
Harold Drew (Southeastern Conference) (1946)
1946	Ole Miss	2–7	1–6	11th			
Johnny Vaught (Southeastern Conference) (1947–1970)
1947	Ole Miss	9–2	6–0	1st	W Delta		13
1948	Ole Miss	8–1	6–1	2nd			15
1949	Ole Miss	4–5–1	2–4	9th			
1950	Ole Miss	5–5	1–5	11th			
1951	Ole Miss	6–3–1	4–2–1	T–3rd			
1952	Ole Miss	8–1–2	4–0–2	3rd	L Sugar	7	7
1953	Ole Miss	7–2–1	4–1–1	T–2nd			
1954	Ole Miss	9–2	5–0	1st	L Sugar	6	6
1955	Ole Miss	10–1	5–1	1st	W Cotton	9	10
1956	Ole Miss	7–3	4–2	4th			
1957	Ole Miss	9–1–1	5–0–1	2nd	W Sugar	8	7
1958	Ole Miss	9–2	3–2	3rd	W Gator	12	11
1959	Ole Miss	10–1	5–1	T–2nd	W Sugar	2	2
1960	Ole Miss	10–0–1	5–0–1	1st	W Sugar	3	2
1961	Ole Miss	9–2	4–1	3rd	L Cotton	5	5
1962	Ole Miss	10–0	6–0	1st	W Sugar	3	3
1963	Ole Miss	7–1–2	5–0–1	1st	L Sugar	7	7
1964	Ole Miss	5–5–1	2–3–1	7th	L Bluebonnet	20	
1965	Ole Miss	7–4	5–3	4th	W Liberty	17	
1966	Ole Miss	8–3	5–2	4th	L Bluebonnet	12	
1967	Ole Miss	6–4–1	4–2–1	5th	L Sun		
1968	Ole Miss	7–3–1	3–2–1	T–6th	W Liberty		
1969	Ole Miss	8–3	4–2	5th	W Sugar	13	8
1970	Ole Miss	7–4	4–2	4th	L Gator		20
Billy Kinard (Southeastern Conference) (1971–1973)
1971	Ole Miss	10–2	4–2	T–4th	W Peach	20	15
1972	Ole Miss	5–5	2–5	T–7th			
1973	Ole Miss (Note: The team was led by head coach Billy Kinard, in his third year, for the first three games and then by Johnny Vaught, in his 25th year, for their last eight games.)	6–5	4–3	3rd			
Ken Cooper (Southeastern Conference) (1974–1977)
1974	Ole Miss	3–8	0–6	10th			
1975	Ole Miss	6–5	5–1	T–2nd			
1976	Ole Miss	6–5 (Note: Mississippi State later forfeited its win over Ole Miss due to NCAA infractions.)	4–3	6th			
1977	Ole Miss	6–5 (Note: Mississippi State later forfeited its win over Ole Miss due to NCAA infractions.)	3–4	6th			
Steve Sloan (Southeastern Conference) (1978–1982)
1978	Ole Miss	5–6	2–4	T–7th			
1979	Ole Miss	4–7	3–3	T–5th			
1980	Ole Miss	3–8	2–5	7th			
1981	Ole Miss	4–6–1	1–5–1	9th			
1982	Ole Miss	4–7	0–6	T–9th			
Billy Brewer (Southeastern Conference) (1983–1993)
1983	Ole Miss	7–5 (Note: Tulane later forfeited its win over Ole Miss due to NCAA infractions.)	4–2	T–3rd	L Independence		
1984	Ole Miss	4–6–1	1–5	T–9th			
1985	Ole Miss	4–6–1	2–4	7th			
1986	Ole Miss	8–3–1	4–2	T–2nd	W Independence		
1987	Ole Miss	3–8	1–5	T–7th			
1988	Ole Miss	5–6	3–4	T–6th			
1989	Ole Miss	8–4	4–3	T–4th	W Liberty		
1990	Ole Miss	9–3	5–2	T–3rd	L Gator	23	21
1991	Ole Miss	5–6	1–6	9th			
1992	Ole Miss	9–3	5–3	2nd (Western)	W Liberty	16	16
1993	Ole Miss	6–5 (Note: Alabama later forfeited its win over Ole Miss due to NCAA infractions.)	4–4	T–4th (Western)			
Joe Lee Dunn (Southeastern Conference) (1994)
1994	Ole Miss	4–7	2–6	T–5th (Western)			
Tommy Tuberville (Southeastern Conference) (1995–1998)
1995	Ole Miss	6–5	3–5	5th (Western)			
1996	Ole Miss	5–6	2–6	T–5th (Western)			
1997	Ole Miss	8–4	4–4	T–3rd (Western)	W Motor City	22	22
1998	Ole Miss (Note: On December 2, 1998, David Cutcliffe was hired as the head football coach at Ole Miss after Tommy Tuberville left for Auburn and coached the bowl game.)	7–5	3–5	4th (Western)	W Independence		
David Cutcliffe (Southeastern Conference) (1998–2004)
1999	Ole Miss	8–4	4–4	3rd (Western)	W Independence	22	22
2000	Ole Miss	7–5	4–4	3rd (Western)	L Music City		
2001	Ole Miss	7–4	4–4	5th (Western)			
2002	Ole Miss	7–6	3–5	4th (Western)	W Independence		
2003	Ole Miss	10–3	7–1	T–1st (Western)	W Cotton	14	13
2004	Ole Miss	4–7	3–5	3rd (Western)			
Ed Orgeron (Southeastern Conference) (2005–2007)
2005	Ole Miss	3–8	1–7	T–5th (Western)			
2006	Ole Miss	4–8	2–6	T–4th (Western)			
2007	Ole Miss	3–9	0–8	6th (Western)			
Houston Nutt (Southeastern Conference) (2008–2011)
2008	Ole Miss	9–4	5–3	2nd (Western)	W Cotton	15	14
2009	Ole Miss	9–4	4–4	3rd (Western)	W Cotton	21	20
2010	Ole Miss	4–8 (Note: On February 11, 2019, Ole Miss announced the vacation of all wins in the years 2010, 2011, 2012, and 2016. In 2013, all wins except the Music City Bowl were vacated. In 2014, all wins except the Presbyterian game were vacated.)	1–7	6th (Western)			
2011	Ole Miss	2–10	0–8	6th (Western)			
Hugh Freeze (Southeastern Conference) (2012–2016)
2012	Ole Miss	7–6	3–5	5th (Western)	W BBVA Compass		
2013	Ole Miss	8–5	3–5	T–5th (Western)	W Music City		
2014	Ole Miss	9–4	5–3	3rd (Western)	L Peach^{†}	19	17
2015	Ole Miss	10–3	6–2	2nd (Western)	W Sugar^{†}	9	10
2016	Ole Miss	5–7	2–6	7th (Western)			
Matt Luke (Southeastern Conference) (2017–2019)
2017	Ole Miss	6–6	3–5	6th (Western)	Ineligible (Note: On February 22, 2017, the University of Mississippi self-imposed a one-year ban from post-season play on the Ole Miss football team for the 2017 season, due to alleged NCAA violations. On July 20, 2017, head coach Hugh Freeze resigned in the wake of allegations about repeated calls to a female escort service from his school-issued cell phone. He was given the ultimatum, either resign or be fired.)		
2018	Ole Miss	5–7	1–7	6th (Western)	Ineligible (Note: On December 1, 2017, the University of Mississippi was dealt multiple sanctions by the NCAA, including a 2-year post-season ban. As Ole Miss already self-imposed a post-season ban during the 2017 season, 2018 was the last season without postseason play due to the sanctions.)		
2019	Ole Miss	4–8	2–6	6th (Western)			
Lane Kiffin (Southeastern Conference) (2020–2025)
2020	Ole Miss	5–5	4–5	5th (Western)	W Outback		
2021	Ole Miss	10–3	6–2	2nd (Western)	L Sugar^{†}	11	11
2022	Ole Miss	8–5	4–4	T–3rd (Western)	L Texas		
2023	Ole Miss	11–2	6–2	T–2nd (Western)	W Peach^{†}	9	9
2024	Ole Miss	10–3	5–3	T–4th	W Gator	13	11
2025	Ole Miss	13–2 (Note: All postseason games were coached by Pete Golding after Lane Kiffin left to become the head coach of LSU.)	7–1	T–1st	W CFP First Round^{†} W Sugar^{†} (CFP Quarterfinal); L Fiesta^{†} (CFP Semifinal)	3	3
Total:		724–550–35					
National championship Conference title Conference division title or championship game berth
^{†}Indicates Bowl Coalition, Bowl Alliance, BCS, or CFP / New Years' Six bowl.; ^{#}Rankings from final Coaches Poll.
