= 1901 Tennessee Volunteers football team =

American college football season

1901 Tennessee Volunteers football
- Conference: Southern Intercollegiate Athletic Association
- Record: 3–3–2 (1–1–2 SIAA)
- Head coach: Gilbert Kelly (1st season)
- Captain: C. E. Hollopeter
- Home stadium: Chilhowee Park

1901 Southern Intercollegiate Athletic Association football standings
	Conf.					Overall
Team	W		L		T	W		L		T
Vanderbilt $	4	–	0	–	0	6	–	1	–	1
Clemson	2	–	0	–	1	3	–	1	–	1
LSU	2	–	1	–	0	5	–	1	–	0
North Carolina	2	–	1	–	0	7	–	2	–	0
Tulane	2	–	1	–	0	4	–	2	–	0
Alabama	2	–	1	–	2	2	–	1	–	2
Auburn	2	–	2	–	1	2	–	3	–	1
Tennessee	1	–	1	–	2	3	–	3	–	2
Mississippi A&M	1	–	2	–	0	2	–	2	–	1
Georgia	0	–	3	–	2	1	–	5	–	2
Cumberland (TN)	0	–	1	–	0	0	–	3	–	0
Kentucky State	0	–	2	–	0	2	–	6	–	1
Ole Miss	0	–	4	–	0	2	–	4	–	0
Texas	0	–	0	–	0	8	–	2	–	1
$ – Conference champion

The 1901 Tennessee Volunteers football team was an American football team that represented the University of Tennessee as a member of the Southern Intercollegiate Athletic Association (SIAA) during the 1901 SIAA football season. In its first and only season under head coach Gilbert Kelly (a former Princeton football player), Tennessee compiled a 3–3–2 record (1–1–2 against SIAA opponents). The team played its home games at Chilhowee Park in Knoxville, Tennessee.

== Schedule ==
Date	Opponent	Site	Result	Attendance	Source
October 12	King*	Chilhowee Park; Knoxville, TN	W 8–0		
October 18	Clemson	Chilhowee Park; Knoxville, TN	T 6–6		
October 26	at Nashville*	Peabody Field; Nashville, TN	L 5–16		
November 2	Kentucky University*	Chilhowee Park; Knoxville, TN	L 0–6		
November 9	at Vanderbilt	Dudley Field; Nashville, TN (rivalry)	L 0–22		
November 16	Georgetown (KY)*	Chilhowee Park; Knoxville, TN	W 12-0		
November 23	Kentucky State College	Chilhowee Park; Knoxville, TN (rivalry)	W 5–0		
November 28	at Alabama	West End Park; Birmingham, AL (rivalry)	T 6–6	3,000	
*Non-conference game
