= 1901 Alabama Crimson White football team =

American college football season

1901 Alabama Crimson White football
- Conference: Southern Intercollegiate Athletic Association
- Record: 2–1–2 (2–1–2 SIAA)
- Head coach: M. S. Harvey (1st season)
- Captain: Earl Drennen
- Home stadium: The Quad; Highland Park; West End Park

1901 Southern Intercollegiate Athletic Association football standings
	Conf.					Overall
Team	W		L		T	W		L		T
Vanderbilt $	4	–	0	–	0	6	–	1	–	1
Clemson	2	–	0	–	1	3	–	1	–	1
LSU	2	–	1	–	0	5	–	1	–	0
North Carolina	2	–	1	–	0	7	–	2	–	0
Tulane	2	–	1	–	0	4	–	2	–	0
Alabama	2	–	1	–	2	2	–	1	–	2
Auburn	2	–	2	–	1	2	–	3	–	1
Tennessee	1	–	1	–	2	3	–	3	–	2
Mississippi A&M	1	–	2	–	0	2	–	2	–	1
Georgia	0	–	3	–	2	1	–	5	–	2
Cumberland (TN)	0	–	1	–	0	0	–	3	–	0
Kentucky State	0	–	2	–	0	2	–	6	–	1
Ole Miss	0	–	4	–	0	2	–	4	–	0
Texas	0	–	0	–	0	8	–	2	–	1
$ – Conference champion

The 1901 Alabama Crimson White football team (Note: Alabama football teams were not referred to as the "Crimson Tide" until the 1907 season. Prior to 1907, the team was called the "Crimson White" from 1893 to 1906 and the "Cadets" in 1892.) (variously "Alabama", "UA" or "Bama") represented the University of Alabama in the 1901 Southern Intercollegiate Athletic Association football season. The team was led by head coach M. S. Harvey, in his first season, and played their home games at The Quad in Tuscaloosa and one game each at Highland Park in Montgomery and at West End Park in Birmingham, Alabama. In what was the ninth season of Alabama football, the team finished with a record of two wins, one loss and two ties (2–1–2, 2–1–2 SIAA).

== Schedule ==
Date	Opponent	Site	Result	Source
October 19	Nashville	West End Park; Birmingham, AL	No contest	
October 26	Ole Miss	The Quad; Tuscaloosa, AL (rivalry)	W 41–0	
November 9	Georgia	Highland Park; Montgomery, AL (rivalry)	T 0–0	
November 15	Auburn	The Quad; Tuscaloosa, AL (rivalry)	L 0–17	
November 16	Mississippi A&M	The Quad; Tuscaloosa, AL (rivalry)	W 45–0	
November 28	Tennessee	West End Park; Birmingham, AL (rivalry)	T 6–6	

- Scoring note: (Note: For the 1901 season, point values were different from those used in contemporary games. In 1901 a touchdown was worth five points, a field goal was worth five points and a conversion (PAT) was worth one point.)

== Game summaries ==
=== Ole Miss ===
Alabama opened the 1901 season with a 41–0 victory over Ole Miss in Tuscaloosa. Alabama scored touchdowns in the first half on a short A. M. Donahoo run, a 60-yard W. A. Weaver run, a short Frank Houston Powe run, a short A. W. Stewart run and on a 90-yard Donahoo kickoff return. In the second half, Alabama scored touchdowns on a 33-yard Weaver and a 20-yard Powe runs for the 41–0 win.

=== Georgia ===
In the second all-time meeting against the University of Georgia, the game ended in a scoreless tie at Montgomery's Highland Park. In a game dominated by punts, the only score of the game was made by Earl Drennen only to be called back on a subsequent penalty.

=== Auburn ===
Against the Alabama Polytechnic Institute (now known as Auburn University) Alabama was upset 17–0 at Tuscaloosa, in a game not officially scheduled until November 11, only four days prior to the contest. Auburn took an 11–0 lead in the first half on a pair of Matt Sloan touchdown runs. Auburn then scored their final points of the game on a W. H. Guinn touchdown run in the second half for the 17–0 victory. This was the second meeting in Tuscaloosa between Alabama and Auburn, and the next Iron Bowl in Tuscaloosa was not played until the 2000 season, 99 years later.

=== Mississippi A&M ===
The day after their loss against Auburn, Alabama defeated the Aggies of Mississippi A&M (now known as Mississippi State University) 45–0 on The Quad. Alabama scored touchdowns in the first half on runs of 35-yards by A. W. Stewart, 15-yards by James Forman, 65-yards by W. A. Weaver and 60-yards from Daniels. In the second half, touchdowns were scored on runs of 30-yards from Daniels, a short Weaver run and a short and 33-yard Weaver run.

=== Tennessee ===
In what was the first game against the rival University of Tennessee, it ended early in a 6–6 tie, when fans rushed onto the field after a controversial offside call and the umpires were unable to clear out the crowd in the second half. In the game, J. L. Broug scored for Tennessee and A. W. Stewart scored for Alabama.

== Players ==
Alabama Crimson White 1901 roster
Guards: R. R. Banks; J. C. Granade; Harmon Burns; Tackles: R. L. Daniel; A. M. Donahoo; James Forman; James C. Gwin; H. H. Jones	Center: Frank Montague Lett; Ends: E. J. Parsons; Frank Houston Powe; Frederick Grist Stickney	Backs: Earl Drennen; W. McMahon; C. M. Plowman; E. J. Parsons; A. W. Stewart; W. A. Weaver
