= 1901 Mississippi A&M Aggies football team =

American college football season

1901 Mississippi A&M Aggies football
- Conference: Southern Intercollegiate Athletic Association
- Record: 2–2–1 (1–2 SIAA)
- Head coach: L. B. Harvey (1st season)

1901 Southern Intercollegiate Athletic Association football standings
	Conf.					Overall
Team	W		L		T	W		L		T
Vanderbilt $	4	–	0	–	0	6	–	1	–	1
Clemson	2	–	0	–	1	3	–	1	–	1
LSU	2	–	1	–	0	5	–	1	–	0
North Carolina	2	–	1	–	0	7	–	2	–	0
Tulane	2	–	1	–	0	4	–	2	–	0
Alabama	2	–	1	–	2	2	–	1	–	2
Auburn	2	–	2	–	1	2	–	3	–	1
Tennessee	1	–	1	–	2	3	–	3	–	2
Mississippi A&M	1	–	2	–	0	2	–	2	–	1
Georgia	0	–	3	–	2	1	–	5	–	2
Cumberland (TN)	0	–	1	–	0	0	–	3	–	0
Kentucky State	0	–	2	–	0	2	–	6	–	1
Ole Miss	0	–	4	–	0	2	–	4	–	0
Texas	0	–	0	–	0	8	–	2	–	1
$ – Conference champion

The 1901 Mississippi A&M Aggies football team represented Mississippi Agricultural & Mechanical College—now known as Mississippi State University—as a member of the Southern Intercollegiate Athletic Association (SIAA) during the 1901 college football season. Led by L. B. Harvey in his first and only season as head coach, the Aggies compiled an overall record of 2–2–1 with a mark of 1–2 in conference play.

== Schedule ==
Date	Opponent	Site	Result	Source
October 26	at Christian Brothers*	Memphis, TN	T 0–0	
October 28	Ole Miss	Starkville Fairgrounds; Starkville, MS (rivalry)	W 17–0	
November 1	at Meridian Athletic Association*	Meridian, MS	W 11–5	
November 9	at Tulane	Tulane Athletic Field; New Orleans, LA	L 6–24	
November 16	at Alabama	The Quad; Tuscaloosa, AL (rivalry)	L 0–45	
*Non-conference game
