= 1901 Cumberland Bulldogs football team =

American college football season

1901 Cumberland Bulldogs football
- Conference: Southern Intercollegiate Athletic Association
- Record: 0–3 (0–1 SIAA)
- Head coach: James Sloan Kuykendall (1st season)
- Captain: R. W. Keeton

1901 Southern Intercollegiate Athletic Association football standings
	Conf.					Overall
Team	W		L		T	W		L		T
Vanderbilt $	4	–	0	–	0	6	–	1	–	1
Clemson	2	–	0	–	1	3	–	1	–	1
LSU	2	–	1	–	0	5	–	1	–	0
North Carolina	2	–	1	–	0	7	–	2	–	0
Tulane	2	–	1	–	0	4	–	2	–	0
Alabama	2	–	1	–	2	2	–	1	–	2
Auburn	2	–	2	–	1	2	–	3	–	1
Tennessee	1	–	1	–	2	3	–	3	–	2
Mississippi A&M	1	–	2	–	0	2	–	2	–	1
Georgia	0	–	3	–	2	1	–	5	–	2
Cumberland (TN)	0	–	1	–	0	0	–	3	–	0
Kentucky State	0	–	2	–	0	2	–	6	–	1
Ole Miss	0	–	4	–	0	2	–	4	–	0
Texas	0	–	0	–	0	8	–	2	–	1
$ – Conference champion

The 1901 Cumberland Bulldogs football team represented Cumberland University in the 1901 Southern Intercollegiate Athletic Association football season. The team was a member of the Southern Intercollegiate Athletic Association (SIAA). Nearly the whole backfield was injured against Mooney.

== Schedule ==
Date	Opponent	Site	Result	Source
October 5	Mooney School*	Lebanon, TN	L 10–12	
October 11	at Southwestern Presbyterian*	Clarksville, TN	L 0–5	
October 25	at Sewanee	Hardee Field; Sewanee, TN	L 5–44	
*Non-conference game
