= 1901 LSU Tigers football team =

American college football season

1901 LSU Tigers football
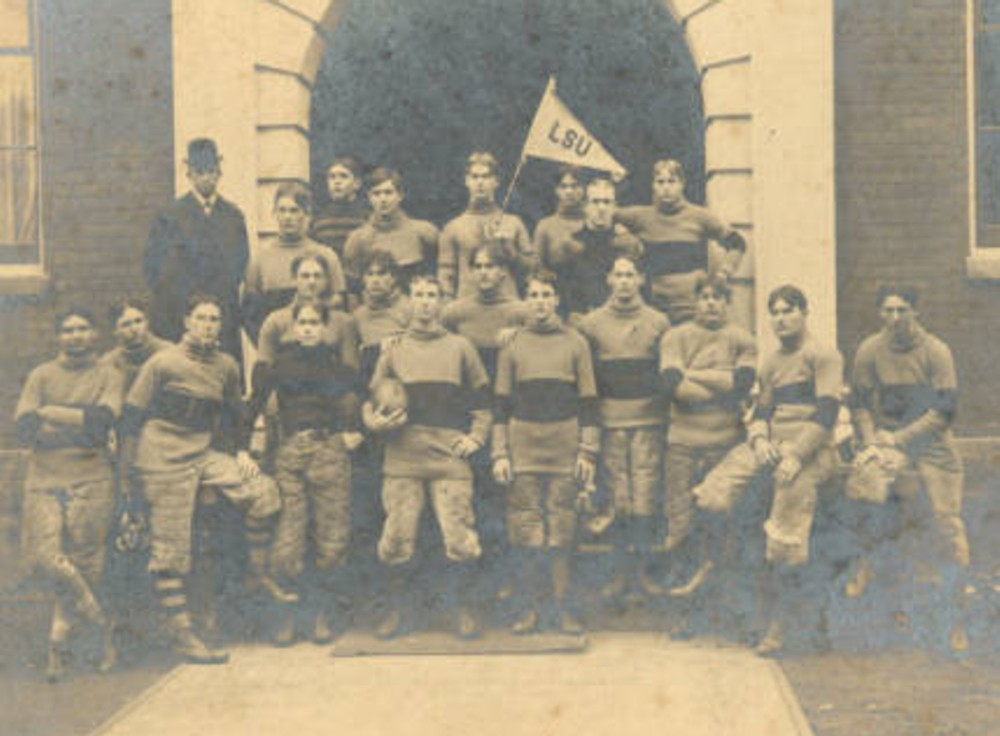
- Conference: Southern Intercollegiate Athletic Association
- Record: 5–1 (2–1 SIAA)
- Head coach: W. S. Borland (1st season)
- Captain: E. L. Gorham
- Home stadium: State Field

1901 Southern Intercollegiate Athletic Association football standings
	Conf.					Overall
Team	W		L		T	W		L		T
Vanderbilt $	4	–	0	–	0	6	–	1	–	1
Clemson	2	–	0	–	1	3	–	1	–	1
LSU	2	–	1	–	0	5	–	1	–	0
North Carolina	2	–	1	–	0	7	–	2	–	0
Tulane	2	–	1	–	0	4	–	2	–	0
Alabama	2	–	1	–	2	2	–	1	–	2
Auburn	2	–	2	–	1	2	–	3	–	1
Tennessee	1	–	1	–	2	3	–	3	–	2
Mississippi A&M	1	–	2	–	0	2	–	2	–	1
Georgia	0	–	3	–	2	1	–	5	–	2
Cumberland (TN)	0	–	1	–	0	0	–	3	–	0
Kentucky State	0	–	2	–	0	2	–	6	–	1
Ole Miss	0	–	4	–	0	2	–	4	–	0
Texas	0	–	0	–	0	8	–	2	–	1
$ – Conference champion

The 1901 LSU Tigers football team represented the LSU Tigers of Louisiana State University during the 1901 Southern Intercollegiate Athletic Association football season. Edmond Chavanne left the Tigers following the 1900 season and was replaced by W. S. Borland as head coach in 1901, leading the team to a successful 5–1 season. Tulane forfeited the game on November 16 due to a ruling from the SIAA. The 1901 edition of the Battle for the Flag against LSU was originally a 22–0 victory for Tulane. It was later forfeited after a petition to the SIAA, and was recorded as a 0–11 loss for Tulane. After the game, LSU protested to the Southern Intercollegiate Athletic Association, and alleged that Tulane had used a professional player during the game. Several months later, the SIAA ruled the game an 11-0 forfeit in favor of LSU. The 1901 season would also be the first time the Tigers would face the Arkansas Razorbacks (then known as the Arkansas Cardinals). LSU would defeat Arkansas for the first time 15-0.

== Schedule ==
Date	Opponent	Site	Result	Attendance	Source
October 28	at Louisiana Industrial*	Ruston, LA	W 57–0		
November 8	Ole Miss	State Field; Baton Rouge, LA (rivalry)	W 46–0		
November 16	at Tulane	New Orleans, LA (rivalry)	W 11–0	5,000	
November 20	Auburn (Agricultural and Mechanical College of Alabama)	State Field; Baton Rouge, LA (rivalry)	L 0–28		
November 28	New Orleans YMCA*	State Field; Baton Rouge, LA	W 38–0		
December 6	Arkansas*	State Field; Baton Rouge, LA (rivalry)	W 15–0		
*Non-conference game

== Roster ==
No.	Player	Position	Height	Weight	Hometown	High School
-	John E. Brogan	Center	-	-	-	-
-	James E. Byram	Tackle	-	-	-	-
-	John J. Coleman	Quarterback	-	-	-	-
-	Frederick W. Cook	End	-	-	-	-
-	J. M. Fourmy	Substitute	-	-	-	-
-	George Fuchs	Guard	-	-	-	-
-	Gueno	End	-	-	-	-
-	Guidry	Tackle	-	-	-	-
-	Edwin S. Gorham	Halfback-	-	-	-	-
-	Herpin	End	-	-	-	-
-	R. N. Kennedy	Halfback	-	-	-	-
-	Henry E. Landry	Fullback	-	-	-	-
-	Laurents	Tackle	-	-	-	-
-	W. O. Martin	Substitute	-	-	-	-
-	Oswald W. McNeese	Halfback	-	-	-	-
-	Adam G. Mundinger	Tackle	-	-	-	-
-	Olivier	End	-	-	-	-
-	Redhead	Tackle	-	-	-	-
-	Henry James Rhodes	Guard	-	-	-	-
-	Sanford	Quarterback	-	-	-	-
-	J. A. Sebastian	Halfback	-	-	-	-

Roster from Fanbase.com and LSU: The Louisiana Tigers
