= John Edgerton =

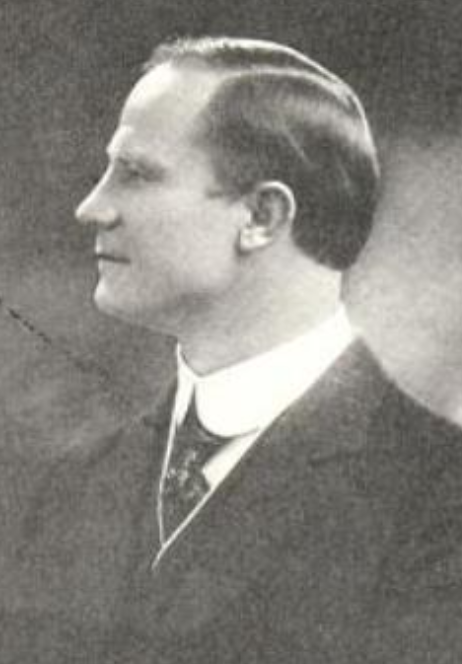
- John Edgerton, from a 1923 publication
- Born: John Emmett Edgerton; October 2, 1879; Johnston County, North Carolina
- Died: August 4, 1938 (aged 58)
- Education: Vanderbilt
- Occupation: Industrialist
- Football career

Vanderbilt Commodores
- Position: Fullback/Guard

Personal information
- Listed height: 5 ft 8 in (1.73 m)
- Listed weight: 175 lb (79 kg)

Career information
- College: Cumberland (1896); Vanderbilt (1899–1903)

Awards and highlights
- SIAA championship (1901, 1902); All-Southern (1902); 1912 All-time Vandy 2nd Team

John Emmett Edgerton (October 2, 1879 – August 4, 1938) was an industrialist who gained prominence as the president of the National Association of Manufacturers from 1921 to 1931. Edgerton was also an All-Southern college football fullback for the Vanderbilt Commodores of Vanderbilt University.

== Early life ==
Edgerton was born on October 2, 1879, in Johnston County, North Carolina, to Gabriel Griffin Edgerton and his wife Harriet Copeland but moved to Lebanon, Tennessee, to join his older brother, Howard K. Edgerton, a physician, in 1896. He attended Cumberland University for prep school and his first year of college. After receiving the Wilson County Cartmell scholarship, he went to Vanderbilt University, earning an A.B. in 1902 and an M.A in 1903.

== Cumberland University ==
He played at Cumberland as a guard in 1896.

== Vanderbilt University ==
=== Football ===
Edgerton was a prominent member of the Vanderbilt football team. Edgerton was captain of the 1901 team. W. A. Reynolds in the Atlanta Constitution selected Edgerton for his All-Southern team in 1902, and he was selected a second team fullback on an All-Time Vandy Team published in 1912, behind Owsley Manier. Edgerton was called by one contemporary writer "one of the best backs yet produced in Dixie." In 1915 Heisman was tasked with selecting the 30 greatest Southern football players, and he mentioned Edgerton first.

=== Track and field ===
Edgerton was also a member of the track team.

=== Bachelor of Ugliness ===
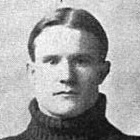
John Edgerton at Vanderbilt, about 1902

One of the highest honors that a student could achieve was the "Bachelor of Ugliness," a title given to the male undergraduate student believed to be most representative of ideal young manhood and the class's most popular member, devised by Professor William H. Dodd in 1885. In the spring semester of 1902, that honor was given to football star John Edgerton. Edgerton was considered such a celebrity that advertisers in the Hustler used his name to sell their products. One such ad read: "John E. Edgerton will be glad to see his friends at Varley, Bauman & Bowers: One Price Clothiers, Hatters, Furnishers and Merchant Tailors."

One account reads: "John Edgerton, whose last year was 1903, was in speed and size the type of man which made the Yale teams of the early nineties so powerful. After leaving college he became one of the head masters at the Columbia Military Academy at Columbia, and is now manager and part owner of a woolen mill at Lebanon, Tenn."

== Memphis University School ==
In 1904 Edgerton coached football at Memphis University School.

== Industrialist ==
Edgerton's national prominence led to notable government appointments. In President Warren Harding’s administration during the early 1920s, he was a member of the president's conference on unemployment, and later in President Herbert Hoover’s administration from 1929 to 1933 he was on the National Reconstruction Conference and the National Re-employment Committee. He also supported Prohibition causes and served as chairman of the United Prohibition Forces to preserve the Eighteenth Amendment. Edgerton was a vocal opponent of the Highlander Folk School.
