= 1901 Kentucky State College Blue and White football team =

American college football season

1901 Kentucky State College Blue and White football
- Conference: Southern Intercollegiate Athletic Association
- Record: 2–6–1 (0–2 SIAA)
- Head coach: William H. Kiler (2nd season)
- Captain: L. Wynn Martin

1901 Southern Intercollegiate Athletic Association football standings
	Conf.					Overall
Team	W		L		T	W		L		T
Vanderbilt $	4	–	0	–	0	6	–	1	–	1
Clemson	2	–	0	–	1	3	–	1	–	1
LSU	2	–	1	–	0	5	–	1	–	0
North Carolina	2	–	1	–	0	7	–	2	–	0
Tulane	2	–	1	–	0	4	–	2	–	0
Alabama	2	–	1	–	2	2	–	1	–	2
Auburn	2	–	2	–	1	2	–	3	–	1
Tennessee	1	–	1	–	2	3	–	3	–	2
Mississippi A&M	1	–	2	–	0	2	–	2	–	1
Georgia	0	–	3	–	2	1	–	5	–	2
Cumberland (TN)	0	–	1	–	0	0	–	3	–	0
Kentucky State	0	–	2	–	0	2	–	6	–	1
Ole Miss	0	–	4	–	0	2	–	4	–	0
Texas	0	–	0	–	0	8	–	2	–	1
$ – Conference champion

The 1901 Kentucky State College Blue and White football team was an American football team that represented Kentucky State College (now known as the University of Kentucky) as a member of the Southern Intercollegiate Athletic Association (SIAA) during the 1901 college football season. In its second and final season under head coach William H. Kiler, the team compiled an overall record of 2–6–1 record with a mark of 0–2 against SIAA opponents.

== Schedule ==
Date	Opponent	Site	Result	Source
October 5	at Vanderbilt	Dudley Field; Nashville, TN (rivalry)	L 0–22	
October 12	Cincinnati*	Lexington, KY	T 0–0	
October 19	at Georgetown (KY)*	Georgetown, KY	W 17–0	
October 26	Kentucky University*	Lexington, KY	L 0–27	
November 2	at Avondale Athletic Club*	Avondale Field; Cincinnati, OH	L 6–17	
November 9	at Louisville YMCA*	League Park; Louisville, KY	L 0–11	
November 16	Central University (KY)*	Lexington, KY (rivalry)	L 0–5	
November 23	at Tennessee	Chilhowee Park; Knoxville, TN (rivalry)	L 0–5	
November 28	Cincinnati*	Lexington, KY	W 16–0	
*Non-conference game
