= 1901 North Carolina Tar Heels football team =

American college football season

1901 North Carolina Tar Heels football
- Conference: Southern Intercollegiate Athletic Association
- Record: 7–2 (2–1 SIAA)
- Head coach: Charles O. Jenkins (1st season)
- Captain: Albert M. Carr
- Home stadium: Campus Athletic Field (II)

1901 Southern Intercollegiate Athletic Association football standings
	Conf.					Overall
Team	W		L		T	W		L		T
Vanderbilt $	4	–	0	–	0	6	–	1	–	1
Clemson	2	–	0	–	1	3	–	1	–	1
LSU	2	–	1	–	0	5	–	1	–	0
North Carolina	2	–	1	–	0	7	–	2	–	0
Tulane	2	–	1	–	0	4	–	2	–	0
Alabama	2	–	1	–	2	2	–	1	–	2
Auburn	2	–	2	–	1	2	–	3	–	1
Tennessee	1	–	1	–	2	3	–	3	–	2
Mississippi A&M	1	–	2	–	0	2	–	2	–	1
Georgia	0	–	3	–	2	1	–	5	–	2
Cumberland (TN)	0	–	1	–	0	0	–	3	–	0
Kentucky State	0	–	2	–	0	2	–	6	–	1
Ole Miss	0	–	4	–	0	2	–	4	–	0
Texas	0	–	0	–	0	8	–	2	–	1
$ – Conference champion

The 1901 North Carolina Tar Heels football team was an American football team that represented the University of North Carolina as a member of the Southern Intercollegiate Athletic Association (SIAA) during the 1901 SIAA season. In its first season under head coach Charles O. Jenkins, the team compiled a 7–2 record (2–1 against SIAA opponents). Albert M. Carr was the team captain. The team was suspended from the conference in 1902 for paying baseball players.

== Schedule ==
Date	Time	Opponent	Site	Result	Attendance	Source
October 12		Oak Ridge Military Academy*	Campus Athletic Field (II); Chapel Hill, NC	W 28–0		
October 16		North Carolina A&M*	Campus Athletic Field (II); Chapel Hill, NC (rivalry)	W 39–0		
October 19		Guilford*	Campus Athletic Field (II); Chapel Hill, NC	W 42–0		
October 26	4:00 p.m.	at Davidson*	Latta Park; Charlotte, NC	W 6–0		
November 2	3:00 p.m.	vs. Georgia	Brisbine Park; Atlanta, GA	W 27–0		
November 4	4:00 p.m.	at Auburn	Drill Field; Auburn, AL	W 10–0		
November 16	4:00 p.m.	at North Carolina A&M*	State Fairgrounds (II); Raleigh, NC	W 30–0		
November 23	2:43 p.m.	vs. Virginia*	League Park (I); Norfolk, VA (rivalry)	L 6–23	5,000	
November 28	3:00 p.m.	vs. Clemson	Latta Park Baseball Field; Charlotte, NC	L 10–22	1,000	
*Non-conference game

== Players ==
=== Line ===
Player	Position	Games started	Hometown	Prep school	Height	Weight	Age
Tod R. Brem	guard						
Walter Council	center, tackle		Council, North Carolina				
Albert Lyman Cox	end		Raleigh, North Carolina				
Frank Foust	tackle					190	
Addison R. Hester	guard						
George L. Jones	guard						
H. M. Jones	center						
William F. Smathers	end						

=== Backfield ===
Player	Position	Games started	Hometown
Albert Carr	fullback		
Louis Graves	quarterback		Chapel Hill, North Carolina
James W. Gulick	halfback		

=== Subs ===
Player	Position
John Donnelly	halfback
William Jacocks	quarterback
Metrah Makeley	quarterback

=== Unlisted ===
Player	Position
W. F. Carr
J. E. Cocke
K. Gant
A. W. Graham
G. W. Graham
Earle P. Holt
R. R. Williams
