= 1901 Georgia Bulldogs football team =

American college football season

1901 Georgia Bulldogs football
- Conference: Southern Intercollegiate Athletic Association
- Record: 1–5–2 (0–3–2 SIAA)
- Head coach: William A. Reynolds (1st season)
- Captain: Frank M. Ridley
- Home stadium: Herty Field

1901 Southern Intercollegiate Athletic Association football standings
	Conf.					Overall
Team	W		L		T	W		L		T
Vanderbilt $	4	–	0	–	0	6	–	1	–	1
Clemson	2	–	0	–	1	3	–	1	–	1
LSU	2	–	1	–	0	5	–	1	–	0
North Carolina	2	–	1	–	0	7	–	2	–	0
Tulane	2	–	1	–	0	4	–	2	–	0
Alabama	2	–	1	–	2	2	–	1	–	2
Auburn	2	–	2	–	1	2	–	3	–	1
Tennessee	1	–	1	–	2	3	–	3	–	2
Mississippi A&M	1	–	2	–	0	2	–	2	–	1
Georgia	0	–	3	–	2	1	–	5	–	2
Cumberland (TN)	0	–	1	–	0	0	–	3	–	0
Kentucky State	0	–	2	–	0	2	–	6	–	1
Ole Miss	0	–	4	–	0	2	–	4	–	0
Texas	0	–	0	–	0	8	–	2	–	1
$ – Conference champion

The 1901 Georgia Bulldogs football team was an American football team that represented the University of Georgia during the 1901 Southern Intercollegiate Athletic Association football season. The Bulldogs completed the season with a 1–5–2 record. Georgia's only victory in the 1901 season came in the first game of the season against South Carolina. The two ties came against Auburn and Alabama. The season also included Georgia's third consecutive loss to Sewanee. This was the Georgia Bulldogs' first season under the guidance of head coach Billy Reynolds.

The end of the 1901 season marked the end of the first decade of football at the University of Georgia. In those ten years, the team had eight different coaches and a combined record of 26–23–4, a winning percentage of .528.

== Schedule ==
Date	Opponent	Site	Result	Source
October 12	vs. South Carolina*	Augusta Baseball Park; Augusta, GA (rivalry)	W 10–5	
October 19	at Vanderbilt	Dudley Field; Nashville, TN (rivalry)	L 0–47	
October 21	at Sewanee	Sewanee, TN	L 0–47	
October 26	Clemson	Herty Field; Athens, GA (rivalry)	L 5–29	
November 2	vs. North Carolina	Atlanta, GA	L 0–27	
November 9	vs. Alabama	Highland Park; Montgomery, AL (rivalry)	T 0–0	
November 15	Davidson*	Herty Field; Athens, GA	L 6–16	
November 28	vs. Auburn	Atlanta, GA (rivalry)	T 0–0	
*Non-conference game
