= 1901 Tulane Olive and Blue football team =

American college football season

1901 Tulane Olive and Blue football
- Conference: Southern Intercollegiate Athletic Association
- Record: 4–2 (2–1 SIAA)
- Head coach: H. T. Summersgill (2nd season)
- Captain: Hugh Krumbhaar
- Home stadium: Tulane Athletic Field

1901 Southern Intercollegiate Athletic Association football standings
	Conf.					Overall
Team	W		L		T	W		L		T
Vanderbilt $	4	–	0	–	0	6	–	1	–	1
Clemson	2	–	0	–	1	3	–	1	–	1
LSU	2	–	1	–	0	5	–	1	–	0
North Carolina	2	–	1	–	0	7	–	2	–	0
Tulane	2	–	1	–	0	4	–	2	–	0
Alabama	2	–	1	–	2	2	–	1	–	2
Auburn	2	–	2	–	1	2	–	3	–	1
Tennessee	1	–	1	–	2	3	–	3	–	2
Mississippi A&M	1	–	2	–	0	2	–	2	–	1
Georgia	0	–	3	–	2	1	–	5	–	2
Cumberland (TN)	0	–	1	–	0	0	–	3	–	0
Kentucky State	0	–	2	–	0	2	–	6	–	1
Ole Miss	0	–	4	–	0	2	–	4	–	0
Texas	0	–	0	–	0	8	–	2	–	1
$ – Conference champion

The 1901 Tulane Olive and Blue football team represented Tulane University during the 1901 Southern Intercollegiate Athletic Association football season. The season's edition of the Battle for the Rag against LSU was originally a 22-0 victory for Tulane. The LSU Tigers protested the game to the Southern Intercollegiate Athletic Association (SIAA) and alleged that Tulane had used a professional player during the game. Several months later, the SIAA ruled the game an 11–0 forfeit in favor of LSU.

== Schedule ==
Date	Opponent	Site	Result	Attendance	Source
October 16	at Meridian Athletic Club*	Meridian, MS	W 15–0		
October 26	at Mobile YMCA*	Mobile, AL	L 0–2		
November 2	New Orleans YMCA*	Tulane Athletic Field; New Orleans, LA	W 23–0		
November 9	Mississippi A&M	Tulane Athletic Field; New Orleans, LA	W 24–6		
November 16	LSU	Tulane Athletic Field; New Orleans, LA (rivalry)	L 0–11 (forfeit)	5,000	
November 28	Ole Miss	Tulane Athletic Field; New Orleans, LA (rivalry)	W 25–11		
*Non-conference game
