= 1901 Clemson Tigers football team =

American college football season

1901 Clemson Tigers football
- Conference: Southern Intercollegiate Athletic Association
- Record: 3–1–1 (2–0–1 SIAA)
- Head coach: John Heisman (2nd season)
- Captain: Claude Douthit
- Home stadium: Bowman Field

1901 Southern Intercollegiate Athletic Association football standings
	Conf.					Overall
Team	W		L		T	W		L		T
Vanderbilt $	4	–	0	–	0	6	–	1	–	1
Clemson	2	–	0	–	1	3	–	1	–	1
LSU	2	–	1	–	0	5	–	1	–	0
North Carolina	2	–	1	–	0	7	–	2	–	0
Tulane	2	–	1	–	0	4	–	2	–	0
Alabama	2	–	1	–	2	2	–	1	–	2
Auburn	2	–	2	–	1	2	–	3	–	1
Tennessee	1	–	1	–	2	3	–	3	–	2
Mississippi A&M	1	–	2	–	0	2	–	2	–	1
Georgia	0	–	3	–	2	1	–	5	–	2
Cumberland (TN)	0	–	1	–	0	0	–	3	–	0
Kentucky State	0	–	2	–	0	2	–	6	–	1
Ole Miss	0	–	4	–	0	2	–	4	–	0
Texas	0	–	0	–	0	8	–	2	–	1
$ – Conference champion

The 1901 Clemson Tigers football team was an American football team that represented Clemson Agricultural College—now known as Clemson University–as a member of the Southern Intercollegiate Athletic Association (SIAA) during the 1901 SIAA football season. In its second season under head coach John Heisman, the team posted a 3–1–1 record (2–0–1 against SIAA opponents) and finished in second place in the SIAA.

== Schedule ==
Date	Time	Opponent	Site	Result	Source
October 5		Guilford*	Bowman Field; Calhoun, SC	W 122–0	
October 18		at Tennessee	Chilhowee Park; Knoxville, TN	T 6–6	
October 26		at Georgia	Herty Field; Athens, GA (rivalry)	W 29–5	
October 31		vs. VPI*	Columbia, SC	L 11–17	
November 28	3:00 p.m.	vs. North Carolina	Latta Park Baseball Field; Charlotte, NC	W 22–10	
*Non-conference game; All times are in Eastern time
