= 1901 Vanderbilt Commodores football team =

American college football season

1901 Vanderbilt Commodores football

SIAA champion
- Conference: Southern Intercollegiate Athletic Association
- Record: 6–1–1 (4–0 SIAA)
- Head coach: Walter H. Watkins (1st season)
- Captain: John Edgerton
- Home stadium: Dudley Field

1901 Southern Intercollegiate Athletic Association football standings
	Conf.					Overall
Team	W		L		T	W		L		T
Vanderbilt $	4	–	0	–	0	6	–	1	–	1
Clemson	2	–	0	–	1	3	–	1	–	1
LSU	2	–	1	–	0	5	–	1	–	0
North Carolina	2	–	1	–	0	7	–	2	–	0
Tulane	2	–	1	–	0	4	–	2	–	0
Alabama	2	–	1	–	2	2	–	1	–	2
Auburn	2	–	2	–	1	2	–	3	–	1
Tennessee	1	–	1	–	2	3	–	3	–	2
Mississippi A&M	1	–	2	–	0	2	–	2	–	1
Georgia	0	–	3	–	2	1	–	5	–	2
Cumberland (TN)	0	–	1	–	0	0	–	3	–	0
Kentucky State	0	–	2	–	0	2	–	6	–	1
Ole Miss	0	–	4	–	0	2	–	4	–	0
Texas	0	–	0	–	0	8	–	2	–	1
$ – Conference champion

The 1901 Vanderbilt Commodores football team represented Vanderbilt University during the 1901 Southern Intercollegiate Athletic Association football season. The Commodores were coached by Walter H. Watkins in his first year as head coach.

== Schedule ==
Date	Time	Opponent	Site	Result	Attendance	Source
October 5		Kentucky State College	Dudley Field; Nashville, TN (rivalry)	W 22–0		
October 12		Central University*	Dudley Field; Nashville, TN	W 25–0		
October 19		Georgia	Dudley Field; Nashville, TN (rivalry)	W 47–0		
October 26		at Auburn	Riverside Park; Montgomery, AL	W 41–0		
November 2	3:00 p.m.	at Washington University*	Athletic Park; St. Louis, MO	L 11–12	400–2,000	
November 9	3:15 p.m.	Tennessee	Dudley Field; Nashville, TN (rivalry)	W 22–0	1,000	
November 16		Sewanee*	Dudley Field; Nashville, TN (rivalry)	T 0–0		
November 28	2:00 p.m.	Nashville*	Dudley Field; Nashville, TN	W 10–0	5,000	
*Non-conference game

== Before the season ==
Going into the season, the team was built around a veteran nucleus of John Edgerton, Walter Simmons, Hughes, Booth, and Davis. The line was light, but made up for with its aggressiveness. Starting quarterback Fred Hume weighed just 122 pounds.

== Game summaries ==
=== Week 1: Kentucky State College ===
On opening day, the Commodores defeated Kentucky State 22–0, looking much faster than the visitors.

The starting lineup was Williamson (left end), Lawler (left tackle), Hughes (left guard) Perry (center), Crutchfield (right guard), Booth (right tackle), Simmons (right end), Hume (quarterback), Davis (left halfback), Kyle (right halfback), Tigert (fullback).

=== Week 2: Centre ===
In the second week of play, Vanderbilt beat Centre 25–0.

=== Week 3: Georgia ===
The Commodores defeated coach William A. Reynolds' Georgia Bulldogs 48–0, avenging the loss by the same score last year to Reynolds' Tar Heels.

=== Week 4: Auburn ===
Vanderbilt beat Auburn 41–0, in a game that was "extremely disappointing and slow."

=== Week 5: Washington University ===
Vanderbilt at Washington University

Team	1	2	Total
Vanderbilt	11	0	11
• Washington University	6	6	12

- Date: November 2
- Location: Athletic Park
  St. Louis, Missouri
- Game start: 3:00 p.m.
- Game attendance: 400–2,000
- Referee: Todd

Washington University gave the Commodores their only loss of the season, 12–11. Vanderbilt quarterback Fred Hume made a 50-yard gain, setting up John Edgerton's touchdown. Washington fought hard and responded with a touchdown drive, with Cassell making the score. Washington made the extra point, and went up 6–5. Bryan scored another touchdown for Vanderbilt to make the score 11–6 at the half. Washington's Smith scored a touchdown in the second half, and Lehman kicked goal for the win.

The starting lineup was McLean (left end), Lawler (left tackle), Hughes (left guard) Perry (center), Crutchfield (right guard), Booth (right tackle), Simmons (right end), Hume (quarterback), Bryan (right halfback), Edgerton (fullback).

Attendance for the game was reported variously as "hardly exceed[ing]" 400 and 2,000.

=== Week 6: Tennessee ===
Tennessee at Vanderbilt

Team	1	2	Total
Tennessee	0	0	0
• Vanderbilt	11	11	22

- Date: November 9
- Location: Dudley Field
  Nashville, Tennessee
- Game start: 3:15 p. m.
- Game attendance: 1,000
- Referee: Payne

Vanderbilt beat Tennessee 22–0. John Edgerton scored three touchdowns and John J. Tigert scored another.

The starting lineup was McLean (left end), Lawler (left tackle), Hughes (left guard) Perry (center), Crutchfield (right guard), Bryan (right tackle), Simmons (right end), Hume (quarterback), Tigert (left halfback), Kyle (right halfback), Edgerton (fullback).

=== Week 7: Sewanee ===
Coach Billy Suter's Sewanee Tigers fought the Commodores to a scoreless tie despite Vanderbilt gaining 367 yards. Twice the Commodores were stopped at the 1-yard line.

=== Week 8: Nashville ===
Nashville vs. Vanderbilt

Team	1	2	Total
Nashville	0	0	0
• Vanderbilt	5	5	10

- Date: November 28
- Location: Dudley Field
  Nashville, Tennessee
- Game start: 2:00 p. m.
- Game attendance: 5,000
- Referee: George W. Rowbotham (Memphis)

The 1901 team was likely the best football team in University of Nashville (Peabody) history. Coached by Charley Moran, the team defeated Sewanee 39–6 "and mopped up with about everything else." The Commodores practiced in secret for ten days in preparation. Vanderbilt faced Nashville on Thanksgiving Day and won 10–0 in front of 4 to 5,000 spectators, using "Harvard tactics." After thirty minutes of gameplay, John Edgerton scored a touchdown taking the wind out of the sails of Nashville rooters. A riot broke out downtown the next day. According to the account of the event in the Nashville Banner (repudiated in the Hustler), the trouble started when a number of Vanderbilt students "tried to paint the stone fence of the University of Nashville yellow and black."

The starting lineup was McLean (left end), Lawler (left tackle), Hughes (left guard) Perry (center), Crutchfield (right guard), Booth (right tackle), Simmons (right end), Kyle (quarterback), Tigert (left halfback), Davis (right halfback), Edgerton (fullback).
