= 1901 Auburn Tigers football team =

American college football season

1901 Auburn Tigers football
- Conference: Southern Intercollegiate Athletic Association
- Record: 2–3–1 (2–2–1 SIAA)
- Head coach: William M. Williams (1st season)
- Captain: Henry S. Park

1901 Southern Intercollegiate Athletic Association football standings
	Conf.					Overall
Team	W		L		T	W		L		T
Vanderbilt $	4	–	0	–	0	6	–	1	–	1
Clemson	2	–	0	–	1	3	–	1	–	1
LSU	2	–	1	–	0	5	–	1	–	0
North Carolina	2	–	1	–	0	7	–	2	–	0
Tulane	2	–	1	–	0	4	–	2	–	0
Alabama	2	–	1	–	2	2	–	1	–	2
Auburn	2	–	2	–	1	2	–	3	–	1
Tennessee	1	–	1	–	2	3	–	3	–	2
Mississippi A&M	1	–	2	–	0	2	–	2	–	1
Georgia	0	–	3	–	2	1	–	5	–	2
Cumberland (TN)	0	–	1	–	0	0	–	3	–	0
Kentucky State	0	–	2	–	0	2	–	6	–	1
Ole Miss	0	–	4	–	0	2	–	4	–	0
Texas	0	–	0	–	0	8	–	2	–	1
$ – Conference champion

The 1901 Auburn Tigers football team was an American football team that represented Auburn University as a member of the Southern Intercollegiate Athletic Association (SIAA) during the 1901 SIAA season. In its first season under head coach William M. Williams, the team compiled a 2–3–1 record (2–2–1 against SIAA opponents). It was the Tigers' tenth season of intercollegiate football.

== Schedule ==
Date	Opponent	Site	Result	Source
October 19	Nashville*	West End Park; Birmingham, AL	L 5–23	
October 26	Vanderbilt	Riverside Park; Montgomery, AL	L 0–41	
November 4	North Carolina	Drill Field; Auburn, AL	L 0–10	
November 15	at Alabama	The Quad; Tuscaloosa, AL (rivalry)	W 17–0	
November 20	at LSU	State Field; Baton Rouge, LA (rivalry)	W 28–0	
November 27	at Georgia	Piedmont Park; Atlanta, GA (rivalry)	T 0–0	
*Non-conference game
