= 1901 Ole Miss Rebels football team =

American college football season

1901 Ole Miss Rebels football
- Conference: Southern Intercollegiate Athletic Association
- Record: 2–4 (0–4 SIAA)
- Head coach: William Shibley, Daniel S. Martin (1st season)
- Captain: F. W. Elmer

1901 Southern Intercollegiate Athletic Association football standings
	Conf.					Overall
Team	W		L		T	W		L		T
Vanderbilt $	4	–	0	–	0	6	–	1	–	1
Clemson	2	–	0	–	1	3	–	1	–	1
LSU	2	–	1	–	0	5	–	1	–	0
North Carolina	2	–	1	–	0	7	–	2	–	0
Tulane	2	–	1	–	0	4	–	2	–	0
Alabama	2	–	1	–	2	2	–	1	–	2
Auburn	2	–	2	–	1	2	–	3	–	1
Tennessee	1	–	1	–	2	3	–	3	–	2
Mississippi A&M	1	–	2	–	0	2	–	2	–	1
Georgia	0	–	3	–	2	1	–	5	–	2
Cumberland (TN)	0	–	1	–	0	0	–	3	–	0
Kentucky State	0	–	2	–	0	2	–	6	–	1
Ole Miss	0	–	4	–	0	2	–	4	–	0
Texas	0	–	0	–	0	8	–	2	–	1
$ – Conference champion

The 1901 Ole Miss Rebels football team was an American football team that represented the University of Mississippi as a member of the Southern Intercollegiate Athletic Association (SIAA) during the 1901 SIAA football season. In its first season under head coaches William Shibley and Daniel S. Martin, Ole Miss compiled a 2–4 record (0–4 against SIAA opponents) and was outscored by a total of 129 to 34. A seventh game with Christian Brothers was canceled. Right end F. W. Elmer was the team captain.

== Schedule ==
Date	Opponent	Site	Result	Source
October 12	Christian Brothers	Oxford, MS	Cancelled	
October 19	Memphis University School*	Oxford, MS	W 6–0	
October 26	at Alabama	The Quad; Tuscaloosa, AL (rivalry)	L 0–41	
October 28	at Mississippi A&M	Starkville Fairgrounds; Starkville, MS (rivalry)	L 0–17	
November 2	Southwestern Baptist*	Oxford, MS	W 17–0	
November 8	at LSU	State Field; Baton Rouge, LA (rivalry)	L 0–46	
November 28	at Tulane	New Orleans, LA	L 11–25	
*Non-conference game
