= Charles O. Jenkins =

American football coach, lawyer, and shipbuilder

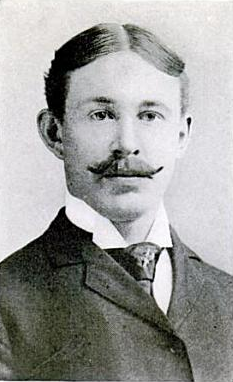
- Jenkins pictured in Quarter-century Record, Class of 1894 Yale College

Biographical details
- Born: May 28, 1872; Cleveland, Ohio, U.S.
- Died: August 30, 1952 (aged 80)

Coaching career (HC unless noted)
- 1894–1896: Western Reserve
- 1901: North Carolina

Head coaching record
- Overall: 19–9–5

Charles Orlando Jenkins (May 28, 1872 – August 30, 1952) was an American college football coach, lawyer, and shipbuilder. He served as the head football coach at Western Reserve University from 1894 to 1896 and at the University of North Carolina at Chapel Hill in 1901, compiling a career coaching record of 19–9–5.

Jenkins was born on May 28, 1872, in Cleveland. He attended Central High School in Cleveland and spent a year at Harvard University before moving on Yale University, from which he graduated in 1894. Jenkins was a substitute on the Yale Bulldogs football team, playing as a tackle. After he graduated from Harvard Law School, in 1901, Jenkins formed a law practice with Roger M. Lee under the name of Lee and Jenkins, which focused on admiralty law. He later ran the Jenkins Steamship Company, which built and operated steel freight steamers. Jenkins died in 1952.

== Head coaching record ==
Year	Team	Overall	Conference	Standing
Western Reserve (Independent) (1894–1896)
1894	Western Reserve	7–0		
1895	Western Reserve	2–4–1		
1896	Western Reserve	3–3–2		
Western Reserve:		12–7–3		
North Carolina Tar Heels (Southern Intercollegiate Athletic Association) (1901)
1901	North Carolina	7–2	2–1	
North Carolina:		7–2	2–1	
Total:		19–9–5		
