= L. B. Harvey =

American football coach and athletics administrator

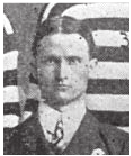

Playing career
- 1901: Mississippi A&M
- Position: Halfback

Coaching career (HC unless noted)
- 1900: Gibraltar Athletic Club
- 1900: Georgtown (assistant)
- 1901: Mississippi A&M

Administrative career (AD unless noted)
- 1901: Mississippi A&M

Head coaching record
- Overall: 2–2–1 (college)

L. B. Harvey was an American football coach and athletics administrator. He was the third head football coach at Mississippi Agricultural & Mechanical College—now known as Mississippi State University—serving for one season, in 1901, and compiling a record of 2–2–1.

A native of Louisville, Kentucky, Harvey was the coach for football team of the Gibraltar Athletic Club in Washington, D.C. and an assistant coach at Georgetown University in 1900. He was hired as the football coach and athletic director at Mississippi A&M in 1901. One of his two victories was the first against rival Ole Miss in what was later dubbed the Egg Bowl in their first all-time meeting.

== Head coaching record ==
Year	Team	Overall	Conference	Standing	Bowl/playoffs
Mississippi A&M Aggies (Southern Intercollegiate Athletic Association) (1901)
1901	Mississippi A&M	2–2–1	1–2		
Mississippi A&M:		2–2–1	1–2		
Total:		2–2–1			
