= Third Saturday in October =

American college football rivalry game

- Alabama Crimson Tide Tennessee Volunteers
- First meeting: November 28, 1901; Tennessee 6, Alabama 6
- Latest meeting: October 17, 2026; Tennessee 26, Alabama 10
- Next meeting: October 16, 2027

Statistics
- Total meetings: 109
- All-time series: Alabama leads, 60–41–7
- Largest victory: Alabama, 51–0 (1906); Tennessee, 41–14 (1969, 1995)
- Longest win streak: Alabama, 15 (2007–2021); Tennessee, 7 (1995–2001)
- Current win streak: Tennessee, 1 (2026–present)

Locations of Alabama and Tennessee

The Third Saturday in October is an American college football rivalry game played annually by the Crimson Tide of the University of Alabama and the Volunteers of the University of Tennessee. The respective campuses are located approximately 310 miles (500 km) apart. It is known as the Third Saturday in October because the game was traditionally played at such date prior to the 1992 football season, when the Southeastern Conference (SEC) split into its East and West divisions. From 2000 to 2025, it has only been scheduled on that date 13 times. Alabama leads the series 60–41–8. At 41 wins, Tennessee has more victories over Alabama than any other program in college football. Likewise, at 60 wins, Alabama has more victories over Tennessee than any other program in college football.

== Series history ==
The first game was played in 1901 in Birmingham, a 6–6 tie. From 1903 to 1913, Alabama dominated the series, only losing once and never allowing a touchdown by the Volunteers.

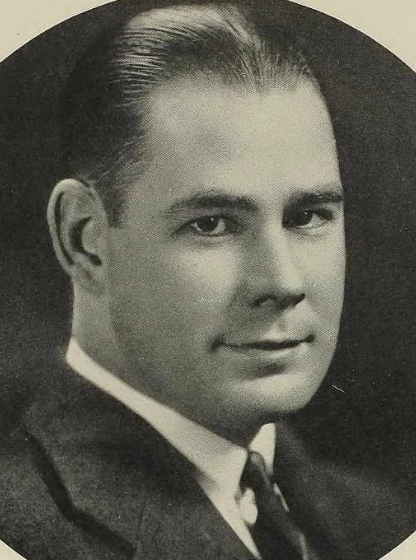
Coach Neyland

Beginning in 1928, the rivalry was scheduled on its "traditional" date. It has been renewed annually since then. Robert Neyland, namesake of Tennessee's present stadium, had arrived in Knoxville two years earlier and had begun challenging Alabama for the top of the Southern Conference standings, a push that continued when the two schools helped found the SEC in 1932. It was officially given the name Third Saturday in October 1939. Both Robert Neyland and Bear Bryant made the rivalry heated during their tenure at Tennessee and Alabama.

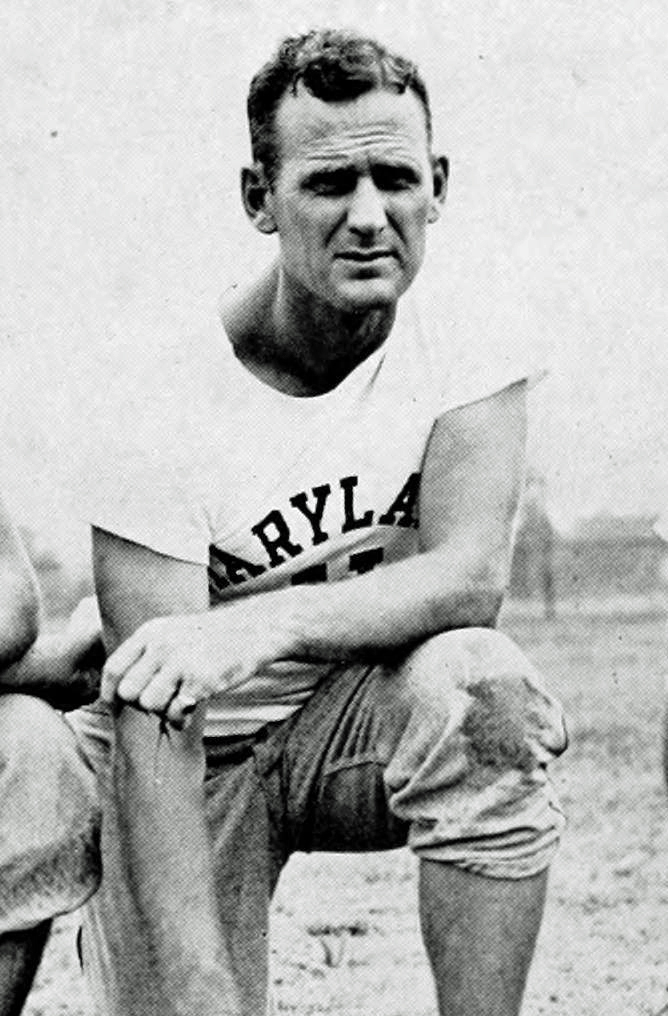
Coach Bryant

The Alabama–Tennessee game has been played in three locations: Birmingham, Alabama; Knoxville, Tennessee; and Tuscaloosa, Alabama. In the first four (1901–1908) meetings, the game was held in Birmingham, Alabama. In 1909, the home and home series began, though most of Alabama's home games against Tennessee were played in Birmingham. The teams did play in Tuscaloosa a few times through 1930. The game was not played in Tuscaloosa from 1930 until 1999. Alabama leads the series in all three venues: for games contested in Birmingham, 21–14–6; in Knoxville, 27–23–1; and in Tuscaloosa, 12–4.

Alabama and Tennessee both have 12 shutouts in the series.

=== Victory cigars ===
In the 1950s, Jim Goostree, the head athletic trainer for Alabama, began another tradition as he began handing out cigars following a victory over the Volunteers. Both teams continued the tradition for some time, though kept it secret due to NCAA rules concerning extra benefits and tobacco products. Alabama publicly restarted the tradition in 2005, though as a result, self-reported an NCAA violation. Every year since 2007, the winner of the Alabama–Tennessee game knowingly violates the NCAA rule and reports the violation in honor of tradition.

=== Streaks ===
The Alabama–Tennessee rivalry has been known for streaks. In the first major streak of the series, Bama won seven straight over the Vols from 1905 to 1913 (the two teams did not play in 1910 and 1911), outscoring the Vols 112–0 in the process.

Alabama had the longest winning streak of the series, extending 15 games from 2007 to 2021, until October 15, 2022, when Tennessee defeated Alabama 52–49, the first time Tennessee defeated Nick Saban during his tenure at Alabama. An eleven-game Alabama streak (1971–1981) was broken in 1982 when Johnny Majors led the Vols to an upset victory over Bear Bryant and the Tide.

Alabama had a nine-game unbeaten streak from 1986 to 1994, including a tie in 1993 which was later forfeited due to NCAA sanctions. The streak was broken by Tennessee in 1995 when the Vols beat the Tide 41–14, beginning their own seven game win streak which was broken in 2002 when Alabama defeated the Vols 34–14. To date, Alabama maintains the longest streak of victories over Tennessee at fifteen.

== Game results ==
Rankings are from the AP Poll

Alabama victories	Tennessee victories	Ties	Forfeits / Vacated wins (Note: Alabama's 1993 tie was forfeited as the NCAA found Antonio Langham guilty of receiving improper benefits after signing with an agent following the 1992 season, forcing Alabama to forfeit all games in which Langham competed.) (Note: Alabama's 2005 victory was vacated as part of NCAA sanctions.)

No.	Date	Location	Winning team		Losing team	
1	November 28, 1901	Birmingham, AL	Tie	6	Tie	6
2	November 26, 1903	Birmingham, AL	Alabama	24	Tennessee	0
3	November 24, 1904	Birmingham, AL	Tennessee	5	Alabama	0
4	November 30, 1905	Birmingham, AL	Alabama	29	Tennessee	0
5	November 29, 1906	Birmingham, AL	Alabama	51	Tennessee	0
6	November 28, 1907	Birmingham, AL	Alabama	5	Tennessee	0
7	November 26, 1908	Birmingham, AL	Alabama	4	Tennessee	0
8	November 13, 1909	Knoxville, TN	Alabama	10	Tennessee	0
9	November 28, 1912	Birmingham, AL	Alabama	7	Tennessee	0
10	November 14, 1913	Tuscaloosa, AL	Alabama	6	Tennessee	0
11	October 24, 1914	Knoxville, TN	Tennessee	17	Alabama	7
12	October 20, 1928	Tuscaloosa, AL	Tennessee	15	Alabama	13
13	October 19, 1929	Knoxville, TN	Tennessee	6	Alabama	0
14	October 18, 1930	Tuscaloosa, AL	Alabama	18	Tennessee	6
15	October 17, 1931	Knoxville, TN	Tennessee	25	Alabama	0
16	October 15, 1932	Birmingham, AL	Tennessee	7	Alabama	3
17	October 21, 1933	Knoxville, TN	Alabama	12	Tennessee	6
18	October 20, 1934	Birmingham, AL	Alabama	13	Tennessee	6
19	October 19, 1935	Knoxville, TN	Alabama	25	Tennessee	0
20	October 17, 1936	Birmingham, AL	Tie	0	Tie	0
21	October 16, 1937	Knoxville, TN	Alabama	14	Tennessee	7
22	October 15, 1938	Birmingham, AL	Tennessee	13	Alabama	0
23	October 21, 1939	Knoxville, TN	#5 Tennessee	21	#8 Alabama	0
24	October 19, 1940	Birmingham, AL	#5 Tennessee	27	Alabama	12
25	October 18, 1941	Knoxville, TN	Alabama	9	Tennessee	2
26	October 17, 1942	Birmingham, AL	#4 Alabama	8	#15 Tennessee	0
27	October 21, 1944	Knoxville, TN	Tie	0	Tie	0
28	October 20, 1945	Birmingham, AL	#6 Alabama	25	Tennessee	7
29	October 19, 1946	Knoxville, TN	#9 Tennessee	12	#7 Alabama	0
30	October 18, 1947	Birmingham, AL	Alabama	10	Tennessee	0
31	October 16, 1948	Knoxville, TN	Tennessee	21	Alabama	6
32	October 15, 1949	Birmingham, AL	Tie	7	Tie	7
33	October 21, 1950	Knoxville, TN	#18 Tennessee	14	Alabama	9
34	October 20, 1951	Birmingham, AL	#2 Tennessee	27	Alabama	13
35	October 18, 1952	Knoxville, TN	Tennessee	15	#18 Alabama	0
36	October 17, 1953	Birmingham, AL	Tie	0	Tie	0
37	October 16, 1954	Knoxville, TN	Alabama	27	Tennessee	0
38	October 15, 1955	Birmingham, AL	Tennessee	20	Alabama	0
39	October 20, 1956	Knoxville, TN	#7 Tennessee	24	Alabama	0
40	October 19, 1957	Birmingham, AL	Tennessee	14	Alabama	0
41	October 18, 1958	Knoxville, TN	Tennessee	14	Alabama	7
42	October 17, 1959	Birmingham, AL	Tie	7	Tie	7
43	October 15, 1960	Knoxville, TN	Tennessee	20	#15 Alabama	7
44	October 21, 1961	Birmingham, AL	#5 Alabama	34	Tennessee	3
45	October 20, 1962	Knoxville, TN	#2 Alabama	27	Tennessee	7
46	October 19, 1963	Birmingham, AL	#9 Alabama	35	Tennessee	0
47	October 17, 1964	Knoxville, TN	#3 Alabama	19	Tennessee	8
48	October 16, 1965	Birmingham, AL	Tie	7	Tie	7
49	October 15, 1966	Knoxville, TN	#3 Alabama	11	Tennessee	10
50	October 21, 1967	Birmingham, AL	#7 Tennessee	24	#6 Alabama	13
51	October 19, 1968	Knoxville, TN	#8 Tennessee	10	Alabama	9
52	October 18, 1969	Birmingham, AL	#13 Tennessee	41	#20 Alabama	14
53	October 17, 1970	Knoxville, TN	#14 Tennessee	24	Alabama	0
54	October 16, 1971	Birmingham, AL	#4 Alabama	32	#14 Tennessee	15
55	October 21, 1972	Knoxville, TN	#3 Alabama	17	#10 Tennessee	10

No.	Date	Location	Winning team		Losing team	
56	October 20, 1973	Birmingham, AL	#2 Alabama	42	#10 Tennessee	21
57	October 19, 1974	Knoxville, TN	#4 Alabama	28	Tennessee	6
58	October 18, 1975	Birmingham, AL	#6 Alabama	30	#16 Tennessee	7
59	October 16, 1976	Knoxville, TN	#20 Alabama	20	Tennessee	13
60	October 15, 1977	Birmingham, AL	#4 Alabama	24	Tennessee	10
61	October 21, 1978	Knoxville, TN	#4 Alabama	30	Tennessee	17
62	October 20, 1979	Birmingham, AL	#1 Alabama	27	#18 Tennessee	17
63	October 18, 1980	Knoxville, TN	#1 Alabama	27	Tennessee	0
64	October 17, 1981	Birmingham, AL	#15 Alabama	38	Tennessee	19
65	October 16, 1982	Knoxville, TN	Tennessee	35	#2 Alabama	28
66	October 15, 1983	Birmingham, AL	Tennessee	41	#11 Alabama	34
67	October 20, 1984	Knoxville, TN	Tennessee	28	Alabama	27
68	October 19, 1985	Birmingham, AL	#20 Tennessee	16	#15 Alabama	14
69	October 18, 1986	Knoxville, TN	#2 Alabama	56	Tennessee	28
70	October 17, 1987	Birmingham, AL	Alabama	41	#8 Tennessee	22
71	October 15, 1988	Knoxville, TN	Alabama	28	Tennessee	20
72	October 21, 1989	Birmingham, AL	#10 Alabama	47	#6 Tennessee	30
73	October 20, 1990	Knoxville, TN	Alabama	9	#3 Tennessee	6
74	October 19, 1991	Birmingham, AL	#14 Alabama	24	#8 Tennessee	19
75	October 17, 1992	Knoxville, TN	#4 Alabama	17	#13 Tennessee	10
76	October 16, 1993	Birmingham, AL	#10 Tennessee	17	#2 Alabama†	17
77	October 15, 1994	Knoxville, TN	#10 Alabama	17	Tennessee	13
78	October 14, 1995	Birmingham, AL	#6 Tennessee	41	#11 Alabama	14
79	October 26, 1996	Knoxville, TN	#6 Tennessee	20	#7 Alabama	13
80	October 18, 1997	Birmingham, AL	#9 Tennessee	38	Alabama	21
81	October 24, 1998	Knoxville, TN	#3 Tennessee	35	Alabama	18
82	October 23, 1999	Tuscaloosa, AL	#5 Tennessee	21	#10 Alabama	7
83	October 21, 2000	Knoxville, TN	Tennessee	20	Alabama	10
84	October 20, 2001	Tuscaloosa, AL	#11 Tennessee	35	Alabama	24
85	October 26, 2002	Knoxville, TN	#19 Alabama	34	#16 Tennessee	14
86	October 25, 2003	Tuscaloosa, AL	#22 Tennessee	51	Alabama	43^{5OT}
87	October 23, 2004	Knoxville, TN	#11 Tennessee	17	Alabama	13
88	October 22, 2005	Tuscaloosa, AL	#5 Alabama^{‡}	6	#17 Tennessee	3
89	October 21, 2006	Knoxville, TN	#7 Tennessee	16	Alabama	13
90	October 20, 2007	Tuscaloosa, AL	Alabama	41	#20 Tennessee	17
91	October 25, 2008	Knoxville, TN	#2 Alabama	29	Tennessee	9
92	October 24, 2009	Tuscaloosa, AL	#1 Alabama	12	Tennessee	10
93	October 23, 2010	Knoxville, TN	#8 Alabama	41	Tennessee	10
94	October 22, 2011	Tuscaloosa, AL	#2 Alabama	37	Tennessee	6
95	October 20, 2012	Knoxville, TN	#1 Alabama	44	Tennessee	13
96	October 26, 2013	Tuscaloosa, AL	#1 Alabama	45	Tennessee	10
97	October 25, 2014	Knoxville, TN	#4 Alabama	34	Tennessee	20
98	October 24, 2015	Tuscaloosa, AL	#8 Alabama	19	Tennessee	14
99	October 15, 2016	Knoxville, TN	#1 Alabama	49	#9 Tennessee	10
100	October 21, 2017	Tuscaloosa, AL	#1 Alabama	45	Tennessee	7
101	October 20, 2018	Knoxville, TN	#1 Alabama	58	Tennessee	21
102	October 19, 2019	Tuscaloosa, AL	#1 Alabama	35	Tennessee	13
103	October 24, 2020	Knoxville, TN	#2 Alabama	48	Tennessee	17
104	October 23, 2021	Tuscaloosa, AL	#4 Alabama	52	Tennessee	24
105	October 15, 2022	Knoxville, TN	#6 Tennessee	52	#3 Alabama	49
106	October 21, 2023	Tuscaloosa, AL	#11 Alabama	34	#17 Tennessee	20
107	October 19, 2024	Knoxville, TN	#11 Tennessee	24	#7 Alabama	17
108	October 18, 2025	Tuscaloosa, AL	#6 Alabama	37	#11 Tennessee	20
109	October 17, 2026	Knoxville, TN	#14 Tennessee	26	#6 Alabama	10
Series: Alabama leads 60–41–7

=== Results by location ===
As of October 17, 2026

State	City	Games	Alabama victories	Tennessee victories	Ties	Years played
Tennessee	Knoxville	51	27	23	1	1909–present
Alabama	Birmingham	41	21	14	6	1901–1912, 1932–1997
Alabama	Tuscaloosa	17	12	4	0	1913–1930, 1999–present

=== Summary by decade ===
As of October 17, 2026

Years	Games	Alabama victories	Tennessee victories	Ties	Score
1900s	8	6	1	1	Alabama 129–Tennessee 11
1910s	3	2	1	0	Alabama 20–Tennessee 17
1920s	2	0	2	0	Alabama 13–Tennessee 21
1930s	10	5	4	1	Alabama 120–Tennessee 84
1940s	9	4	3	2	Alabama 77–Tennessee 76
1950s	10	1	7	2	Alabama 63–Tennessee 135
1960s	10	5	4	1	Alabama 176–Tennessee 130
1970s	10	9	1	0	Alabama 250–Tennessee 140
1980s	10	6	4	0	Alabama 340–Tennessee 239
1990s	10	4	6	0	Alabama 140–Tennessee 220
2000s	10	4	5	0	Alabama 219–Tennessee 192
2010s	10	10	0	0	Alabama 407–Tennessee 124
2020s	7	4	3	0	Alabama 247–Tennessee 183
Total	109	60	41	7	Alabama 2,201–Tennessee 1,572

== Coaching records ==
As of October 18, 2025

=== Alabama ===
Head Coach	Games	Seasons	Wins	Losses	Ties	Win %
Kalen DeBoer	3	2024–present	1	2	0	0.333
Nick Saban	17	2007–2023	16	1	0	0.941
Mike Shula	4	2003–2006	1	3	0	0.000
Dennis Franchione	2	2001–2002	1	1	0	0.500
Mike DuBose	4	1997–2000	0	4	0	0.000
Gene Stallings	7	1990–1996	4	3	0	0.571
Bill Curry	3	1987–1989	3	0	0	1.000
Ray Perkins	4	1983–1986	1	3	0	0.250
Bear Bryant	25	1958–1982	16	7	2	0.696
Jennings B. Whitworth	3	1955–1957	0	3	0	0.000
Harold Drew	8	1947–1954	2	4	2	0.375
Frank Thomas	15	1931–1946	7	6	2	0.533
Wallace Wade	3	1923–1930	1	2	0	0.333
D.V Graves	3	1911–1914	2	1	0	0.666
J.W.H. Pollard	4	1906–1909	4	0	0	1.000
Jack Leavenworth	1	1905	1	0	0	1.000
W.B. Blount	2	1903–1904	1	1	0	0.500
M.S. Harvey	1	1901	0	0	1	0.500

=== Tennessee ===
Head Coach	Games	Seasons	Wins	Losses	Ties	Win %
Josh Heupel	6	2021–present	3	3	0	0.500
Jeremy Pruitt	3	2018–2020	0	3	0	0.000
Butch Jones	5	2013–2017	0	5	0	0.000
Derek Dooley	3	2010–2012	0	3	0	0.000
Lane Kiffin	1	2009	0	1	0	0.000
Phillip Fulmer	16	1992–2008	11	5	0	0.733
Johnny Majors	16	1977–1992	4	12	0	0.250
Bill Battle	7	1970–1976	1	6	0	0.143
Doug Dickey	6	1964–1969	3	2	1	0.583
Jim McDonald	1	1963	0	1	0	0.000
Bowden Wyatt	8	1955–1962	5	2	1	0.688
Harvey Robinson	2	1953–1954	0	1	1	0.250
Robert Neyland	19	1926–1934, 1936–1940, 1946–1952	12	5	2	0.684
John Barnhill	4	1941–1942, 1944–1945	0	3	1	0.125
W.H. Britton	1	1935	0	1	0	0.000
Zora Clevenger	3	1911–1915	1	2	0	0.333
George Levene	3	1907–1909	0	3	0	0.000
James DePree	2	1905–1906	0	2	0	0.000
Sax Crawford	1	1904	1	0	0	1.000
Hubert Fisher	1	1902–1903	0	1	0	0.000
Gilbert Kelly	1	1901	0	0	1	0.500

== Notable games ==
1901: 1901 was the first meeting between the two teams. It ended early in a 6–6 tie, when fans rushed onto the field after a controversial offside call and the umpires were unable to clear out the crowd in the second half. In the game, J. L. Broug scored for Tennessee and A. W. Stewart scored for Alabama.

1903: Alabama recorded their first victory in the series with a 24–0 victory in Birmingham.

1904: Tennessee recorded their first victory in the series with a 5–0 victory in Birmingham.

1909: The 1909 meeting of the series was the first to be played in Knoxville. Tennessee fans chased referee R. T. Elgin away from the stadium. Elgin jumped aboard a moving streetcar.

1939: In 1939, #5 Tennessee defeated Alabama 21–0. At this time, the Alabama–Tennessee rivalry was officially designated as Third Saturday in October.

1950: Alabama had a 3–0 first quarter lead with his 20-yard field goal. Tennessee responded with a two-yard Andy Kozar touchdown run in the second quarter to give the Vols a 7–3 halftime lead. After a 43-yard Bobby Marlow touchdown run in the third gave Alabama a 9–7 lead, Kozar scored the game-winning touchdown on a fourth-and-one play, from the Alabama one-yard line, with less than one minute remaining in the game for a 14–9 Tennessee victory.

1951: The matchup between Alabama and Tennessee was the first game of football played in the Deep South to be televised.

1964: In 1964, David Ray gave the Crimson Tide an early 3–0 lead after he connected on a 30-yard field goal in the first quarter. Alabama then extended their lead to 16–0 at halftime with a pair of second-quarter touchdowns. The first came on a one-yard Steve Sloan run and the second after Wayne Cook blocked a Tennessee punt that Gaylon McCollough returned 22-yards for a touchdown. The Volunteers cut the Tide's lead in half to 16–8 with a seven-yard Hal Wantland touchdown run and two-point conversion in the third quarter. A 23-yard Ray field goal in the fourth quarter provided for the final 19–8 Alabama victory.

1965: In a game that saw multiple turnovers result in failed touchdown opportunities, Alabama tied Tennessee 7–7 at Legion Field. After a scoreless first quarter, both teams scored their only touchdown in the second. Stan Mitchell scored first for the Vols on a one-yard run and Steve Sloan followed for Alabama with his one-yard run. The Crimson Tide had a chance to win the game in the final minute of the game. With only 0:36 remaining in the game, Alabama had possession at the Tennessee six-yard line. However, Alabama quarterback Ken Stabler thought the Tide gained a first down on the previous play and threw the ball out-of-bounds on a fourth down play and turned the ball over on downs back to the Vols. Tennessee then ran out the clock for the tie.

1966: A week following Alabama's win over Clemson, Alabama regained the No. 3 position in the AP Poll prior to the game against Tennessee. At a rain-soaked Neyland Stadium, Alabama overcame a 10–0 fourth quarter deficit and defeated the Vols 11–10 and preserved their perfect record. Tennessee scored all of their points in the first quarter. The first points came on a six-yard Dewey Warren touchdown pass to Austin Denney and next on a 40-yard Gary Wright field goal for a 10–0 lead. Still up by 10, the Crimson Tide made their comeback in the fourth quarter. Ken Stabler scored on a one-yard touchdown run and then successfully converted the two-point conversion on a short pass to Wayne Cook that made the score 10–8. With 3:23 left in the game, Steve Davis kicked the 17-yard, game-winning field goal that made the score 11–10. The Volunteers did manage to set up a 19-yard field goal attempt that went wide in the final 0:20 of the contest. The victory improved Alabama's all-time record against Tennessee to 23–19–7.

1967: In 1967, both Alabama and Tennessee were ranked in top ten. The game started with Walter Chadwick scored on a one-yard touchdown run for the Vols, Alabama responded with an eight-yard touchdown that tied the game 7–7 at the end of the first quarter. The score remained tied at the half after a scoreless second quarter.

Tennessee then took a 17–7 lead in the third quarter on an 11-yard Chadwick touchdown pass to Ken DeLong and a 47-yard Karl Kremser field goal. Alabama responded with their final points early in the fourth quarter on a one-yard Ed Morgan touchdown run, but a pass was later intercepted by Albert Dorsey and returned 31-yards for a touchdown and a 24–13 Vols victory. The Tennessee win was also their first over the Crimson Tide since the 1960 season.

1968: In 1968, coach Bryant decide to go for the victory instead of a tie in the final minutes of the game, and after the failed two-point conversion the Volunteers held onto a 10–9 victory at Knoxville. Tennessee took an early 7–0 lead in the first quarter after Richmond Flowers scored on a one-yard touchdown run. Alabama responded later in the quarter with a 28-yard Mike Dean field goal that made the score 7–3. The score remained the same through the fourth quarter when Karl Kremser kicked what was then a SEC record 54-yard field goal that extended the Volunteers lead to 10–3.

After the Tennessee field goal, the Crimson Tide had their most sustained drive of the game. The 80-yard drive culminated in a four-yard Donnie Sutton touchdown reception from Scott Hunter that made the score 10–9. However, instead of playing for the tie and kicking the extra point, coach Bryant elected to go for the win on a two-point conversion. On the attempt, Joe Kelley failed to complete the pass to Sutton and Tennessee won the game as a result 10–9.

1972: After a scoreless first quarter, the Crimson Tide took a 3–0 lead into halftime after Bill Davis connected on a 31-yard field goal in the second. Tennessee then took a 7–3 lead on a two-yard Condredge Holloway touchdown run in the third, and extended it to 10–3 with a 36-yard Ricky Townsend field goal in the fourth quarter. With 2:39 left in the game, Alabama took possession at the Vols 48-yard line, and three plays later Wilbur Jackson scored on a two-yard run. On the Tennessee possession that ensued, John Mitchell recovered a Holloway fumble at the Vols' 17-yard line. On the next play, Terry Davis gave Alabama a 17–10 lead with his touchdown run with just over one minute left in the game. The victory improved Alabama's all-time record against Tennessee to 25–23–7.

1982: Bear Bryant makes his final trip to Neyland Stadium. #2 Alabama's 11-game win streak over the Vols comes to an end 35–28 as Tennessee coach Johnny Majors is carried to mid-field in celebration to shake Bryant's hand one last time. At the time, the largest crowd in NCAA football history witnessed this game, partly due to the World's Fair being in Knoxville in 1982.

1989: In 1989, both teams entered the game undefeated and ranked in the top ten. #10 Alabama defeated #6 Tennessee in an offensive shootout, 47–30.

1990: 2–3 Alabama traveled to Knoxville to face undefeated, #3 Tennessee. The score was tied at 6–6 with 1:35 remaining when Tennessee kicker Greg Harris' 50-yard field goal attempt was blocked by Alabama's Stacy Harrison. The ball bounced all the way to the Tennessee 37 yard line, setting up a field goal attempt for Alabama kicker Philip Doyle 3 plays later. Doyle converted the 48 yard attempt as time expired, giving Alabama a stunning 9–6 upset victory, considered by some the biggest upset in series history.

1993: 5–1, #10 Tennessee led #2, defending national champion Alabama at Legion Field 17–9 with 1:44 remaining. Alabama quarterback Jay Barker then led an 83-yard touchdown drive to close the gap to 17–15 before star wide receiver David Palmer ran in a two-point conversion to tie the game at 17 with only 21 seconds remaining. Tennessee elected to run out the clock, preserving the 17–17 tie – the last tie in Alabama football history — and ending Alabama's 28 game winning streak. Alabama later had to forfeit this game and it is officially considered a Tennessee win.

1995: Having not defeated Alabama since 1985, #6 Tennessee and sophomore quarterback Peyton Manning defeated #10 Alabama in a rout. Unlike past contests, this game was dominated by the Volunteers from the beginning — Peyton Manning threw an 80-yard touchdown pass to Joey Kent on the very first play of the game.

1997: The final game in the series is played in Birmingham. Alabama would later play their home games in the series in Tuscaloosa. Tennessee won the game and starting quarterback Peyton Manning famously led the Pride of the Southland Band following the victory.

1998: The Vols continue their unexpected and undefeated march to Tempe and the national championship by defeating Alabama 35–18 in Knoxville. Tennessee extend their streak to four in a row against Alabama.

2002: #19 Alabama, banned from postseason play due to NCAA probation, defeated #16 Tennessee 34–14 in Knoxville, ending Tennessee's seven-game winning streak – their longest streak in series history.

2003: #22 Tennessee, fighting to stay alive in the SEC East, traveled to Tuscaloosa to take on the unranked Crimson Tide. The two teams went to an unprecedented five overtime periods before Tennessee finally breaks the ice in the fifth overtime scoring a touchdown and the mandatory two-point conversion. Alabama would fail to answer the touchdown and Tennessee left Tuscaloosa victorious with a 51–43 win in the longest game in either team's history.

2005: Tennessee returned to Tuscaloosa ranked 17th after a disappointing 3–2 start following their preseason #3 ranking. Alabama came in ranked #5 and undefeated, their highest ranking entering the game since 1993. A defensive struggle ensued, with neither team able to find the endzone. With the score tied at 3–3, Tennessee appeared ready to score the game's first touchdown with 5:08 remaining. Running back Cory Anderson caught a swing pass and reached the two yard line before Alabama's Roman Harper knocked the ball loose and through the endzone for a touchback. Alabama quarterback Brodie Croyle then drove the Tide down into field goal range where Jamie Christensen kicked the game-winning field goal with 13 seconds left to give the Crimson Tide a 6–3 win and keep their undefeated season alive.

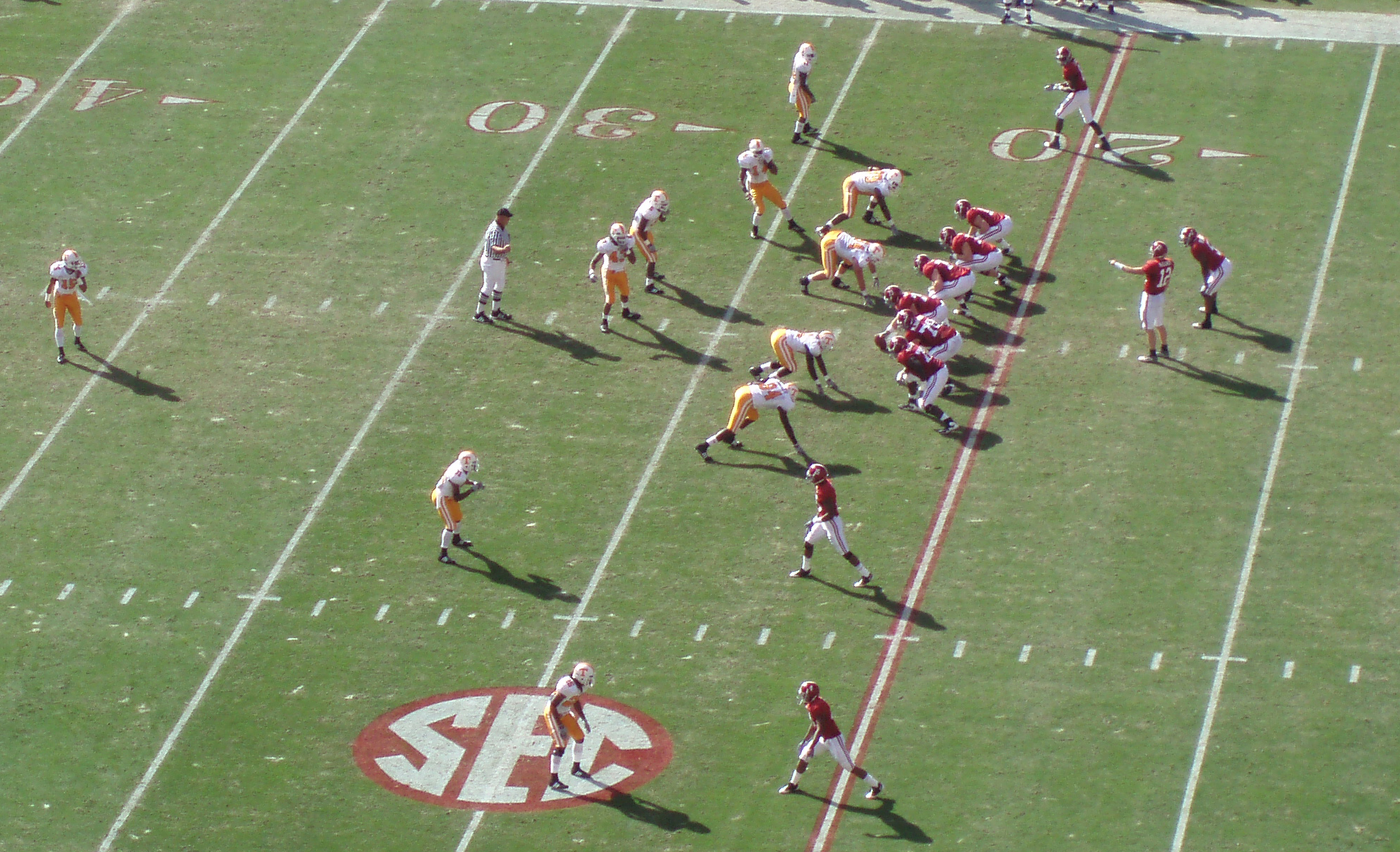
2009 Tennessee vs. Alabama

2009: Despite #1 Alabama entering the game as a 14-point favorite, the Crimson Tide struggled with the Volunteers, holding only a slim 12–3 lead late in the fourth quarter. With Alabama attempting to kill the clock, eventual Heisman Trophy winner Mark Ingram II fumbled for the first time in 296 carries, giving Tennessee the ball in Alabama territory. Tennessee scored the first touchdown of the game eight plays later, making the score 12–10. Tennessee then recovered an onside kick at their own 41 yard line, needing only a field goal to pull off the upset. After reaching the Alabama 28 yard line, Tennessee attempted a would-be game-winning field goal of 43 yards. Alabama's standout defensive lineman, Terrence Cody, blocked the low line-drive kick, his second blocked field goal of the quarter, preserving the 12–10 Alabama victory en route to an eventual National Championship.

2015: Tennessee came to Tuscaloosa immediately after a big win against rival Georgia and hoped to get another upset, while Alabama was focused on keeping its College Football Playoff hopes alive. At half time, the game was tied 7–7. Alabama kicked two field goals in the second half, giving them a 13–7 lead in the 4th quarter. With 5:49 left on the clock, Tennessee running back Jalen Hurd scored a touchdown to give the Vols a late 14–13 lead. Alabama responded with a lengthy drive capped off by a 14-yard touchdown run by eventual Heisman Trophy winner Derrick Henry. Alabama attempted a two-point conversion to stretch the lead to a touchdown, but failed, leaving the score at 19–14. On the ensuing drive, Tennessee quarterback Joshua Dobbs was sacked by linebacker Ryan Anderson, leading to a fumble recovered by A'Shawn Robinson. The Crimson Tide then killed the clock, preserving a narrow 19–14 victory and extending their winning streak in the series to 9 games. Alabama would eventually win the College Football Playoff national championship that season.

2018: Alabama defeated Tennessee 58–21 in Knoxville. The 58 points scored by Alabama set a new single-game record for points scored in the series.

2022: The two teams entered the game undefeated for the first time since 1989. #6 Tennessee jumped out to an early 28–10 lead before Alabama quarterback Bryce Young brought the #3 Tide back to take the lead in the third quarter. The teams traded touchdowns up to the final minute, leaving the score tied 49–49. Alabama had the ball at Tennessee's 32-yard line with under a minute remaining, where Tennessee forced three straight incompletions. Alabama missed a field goal with 15 seconds remaining, and Tennessee quarterback Hendon Hooker was able to get the Vols in range for a game winning field goal as time expired. Tennessee kicker Chase McGrath converted the 40-yard attempt, breaking Tennessee's 15-year losing streak to Alabama. Tennessee fans at Neyland Stadium stormed the field and tore the goalposts down in celebration, before throwing them into the nearby Tennessee River. Tennessee receiver Jalin Hyatt had an incredible performance, catching five touchdowns out of his six catches and having 207 total receiving yards. Tennessee's 52 points were the most points scored against any Alabama team since 1907.

== Rivalry ties ==
Both football programs share very notable people.

Alvin Kamara, a running back for the New Orleans Saints of the NFL, is the most accomplished professional football player to have played for both Alabama and Tennessee. Kamara started his college career at Alabama before ending up at Tennessee after a stint at Hutchinson Community College.

Bill Battle, Alabama's athletic director from 2013 to 2017, was the head coach of Tennessee from 1970 to 1976 and played on the Crimson Tide's 1961 national championship squad.

Former Tennessee athletic director from 2011 to 2017 Dave Hart played basketball for the Crimson Tide under head coach C. M. Newton and earned a master's degree from University of Alabama in 1972 while working as a graduate assistant men's basketball coach. During his time at Alabama, he worked as executive director of athletics.

Lane Kiffin, Alabama's offensive coordinator from 2014 to 2016, was head coach at Tennessee in 2009.

Jeremy Pruitt, Alabama's defensive coordinator from 2016 to 2017, was the head coach at Tennessee from 2018 to 2020.

Butch Jones, former Tennessee head coach from 2013 to 2017, was an analyst for the Alabama Crimson Tide from 2018 to 2020.

== See also ==
- List of NCAA college football rivalry games
- List of most-played college football series in NCAA Division I
