= List of Alabama Crimson Tide home football stadiums =

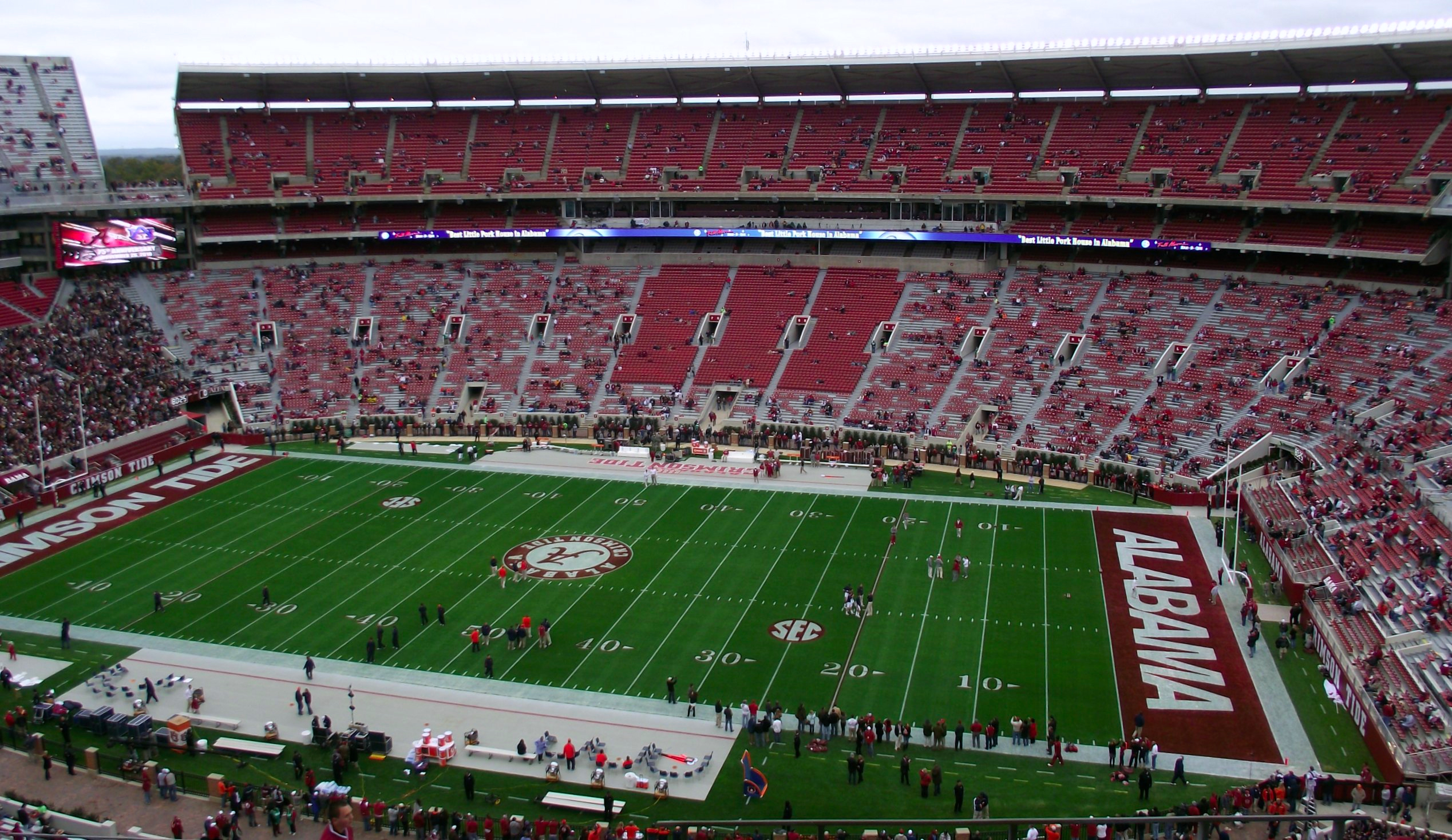
Bryant–Denny Stadium in 2010

The Alabama Crimson Tide football team represents the University of Alabama and has competed in football since 1892. Although the Alabama campus is physically located in Tuscaloosa, through the history of the program, several stadiums located in Tuscaloosa, Birmingham, Montgomery and Mobile have played host to the football team.

== Tuscaloosa ==
=== Bryant–Denny Stadium ===
Bryant–Denny Stadium has served as the on-campus home of the Crimson Tide since its opening on September 28, 1929. Originally known as the George Hutchenson Denny Stadium after the university president of the same name, in 1975 the Alabama state legislature renamed the stadium Bryant–Denny Stadium in honor of then coach Bear Bryant. Originally only have seating for 12,000 fans, further expansions in 1950, 1961, and 1966 raised capacity to 25,000, 43,000, and 60,000, respectively. The first upper deck was added on the west side of the stadium in 1988, adding 10,000 more seats for a capacity of 70,123. On September 5, 1998, the stadium's eastern upper deck was opened, and raised its official seating capacity to 83,818 at a final cost of $35 million. The University moved all home games here from Legion Field in exchange for the funding given to the project by local municipalities.

Following the 2004 football season, the university spent approximately $47 million on an expansion to the north end zone, which was completed days before the 2006 season opener against Hawaii. The expansion added a new upper deck to the North end zone area, complete with three different levels of skyboxes, which collectively are known as "The Zone", which brought the number of skyboxes in the stadium to 123. This expansion brought its capacity to 92,138 by the 2006 season. An expansion to the south end zone, completed during the Summer of 2010, increased its capacity to over 101,000 to make it the 9th largest stadium in the world by seating. All-time, Alabama has a record of 245 wins, 51 losses and 3 ties at Bryant–Denny in addition to selling out every home game since the 1988 season.

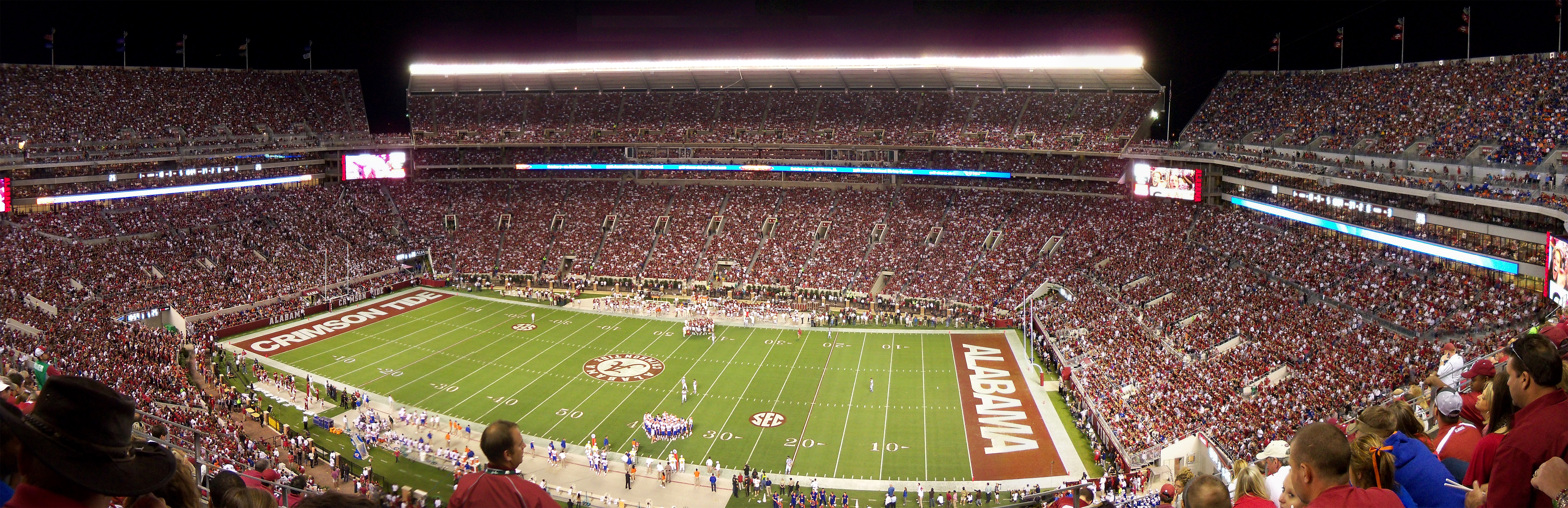
The interior of Bryant-Denny Stadium (south endzone, left) during a 2010 Alabama game versus Florida

=== Denny Field ===
Denny Field served as the home stadium for the Crimson Tide football team from 1915 through the 1928 seasons, excluding 1918 when a team was not fielded due to World War I. Originally named University Field, but renamed in 1920, during its tenure as the team's home field, Alabama amassed an overall home record of 43 wins to only 3 losses.

=== The Quad ===
The first home of Crimson Tide football was located on The Quad at the center of the Alabama campus in Tuscaloosa. The Crimsons as they were known then compiled an overall record of 42 wins to only 11 losses between the 1893 through the 1914 seasons. The location of the playing field on The Quad was located at two locations. The first location of the field was at the southeast corner, with the field running parallel to 6th Avenue, and its second location was moved 90-degrees to the west to run parallel to University Boulevard.

== Birmingham ==
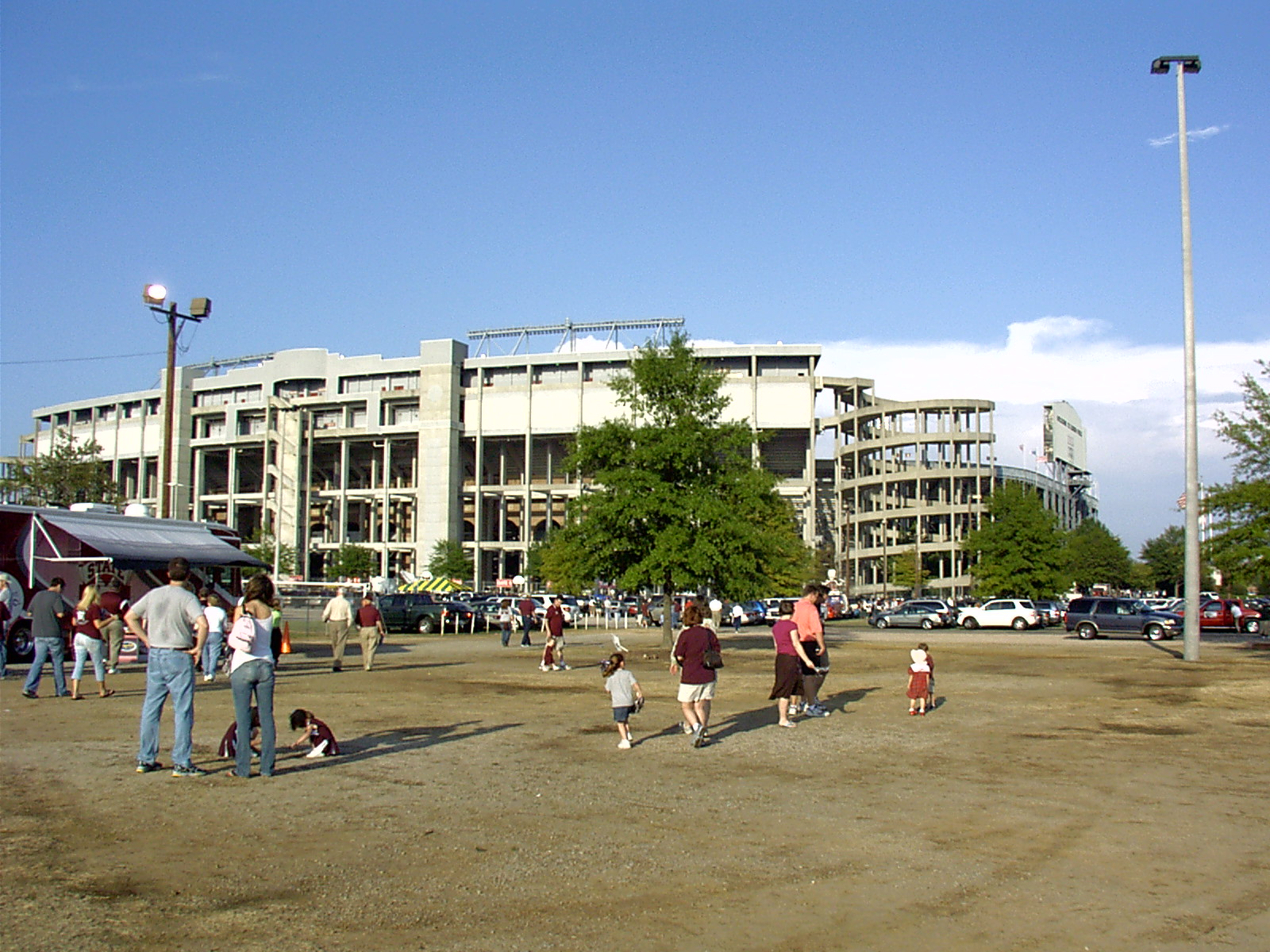
Legion Field in 2006

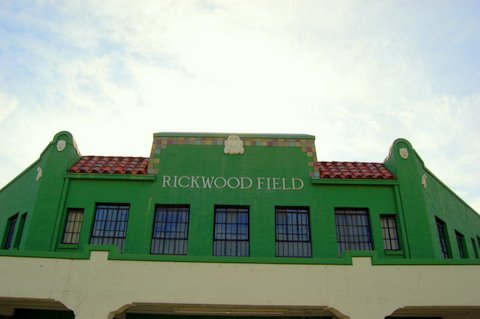
Rickwood Field in 2007

=== Legion Field ===
Opening for Crimson Tide football on November 26, 1927, Legion Field played host to Alabama through the 2003 season. Legion had an original capacity of 21,000, and was expanded over the years to reach a maximum capacity of 83,091 by the 1990s. The Crimson Tide posted an all-time record at Legion Field of 101 wins, 38 losses and 12 ties.

After expanding Bryant-Denny in 1998, Alabama moved major conference games to their campus. In the ensuing years, Alabama decreased the number of games scheduled in Birmingham. The last home game for Alabama at Legion Field was against the University of South Florida on August 30, 2003. Though they had a couple of games scheduled at Legion Field in 2005 and 2008, the disrepair to the stadium and the structural issues to the upper deck led Alabama to end their contract with the city of Birmingham in 2004 and move all home games to Tuscaloosa

=== Rickwood Field ===
Rickwood Field provided for the fifth location of Alabama home games in Birmingham, and is located at the corner of 2nd Avenue West and 12th Street West in the West End. Alabama played home games at Rickwood between the 1912 and 1927 seasons, with an all-time record at Rickwood Field of 23 wins, 12 losses and 5 ties.

=== Birmingham Fairgrounds ===
The Birmingham Fairgrounds provided for the fourth location of Alabama home games in Birmingham, and is located in western Birmingham at the location of Birmingham International Raceway. Alabama played home games at the fairgrounds between the 1905 and 1911 seasons, with an all-time record at the Birmingham Fairgrounds of 12–6–2.

=== West End Park ===
West End Park, also known as "Slag Pile Field", and also the home of the Birmingham Barons before Rickwood Field was constructed, was the third location of Alabama home games in Birmingham. The Crimsons played home games at West End Park between the 1901 and 1904 seasons, with an all-time record at West End Park of 3–5–1.

=== Lakeview Park ===
Located at the present-day intersection of Highland and Clairmont Avenues, Lakeview Park has the distinction of being the first home of Alabama football. On November 11, 1892, Alabama won its first game ever played, against Birmingham High School 56–0. They lost the first Iron Bowl against Auburn, 32–22, on February 22, 1893 at Lakeview. Alabama played home games at Lakeview between the 1892 and 1894 seasons, with an all-time record at Lakeview Park of 2–5.

== Montgomery ==
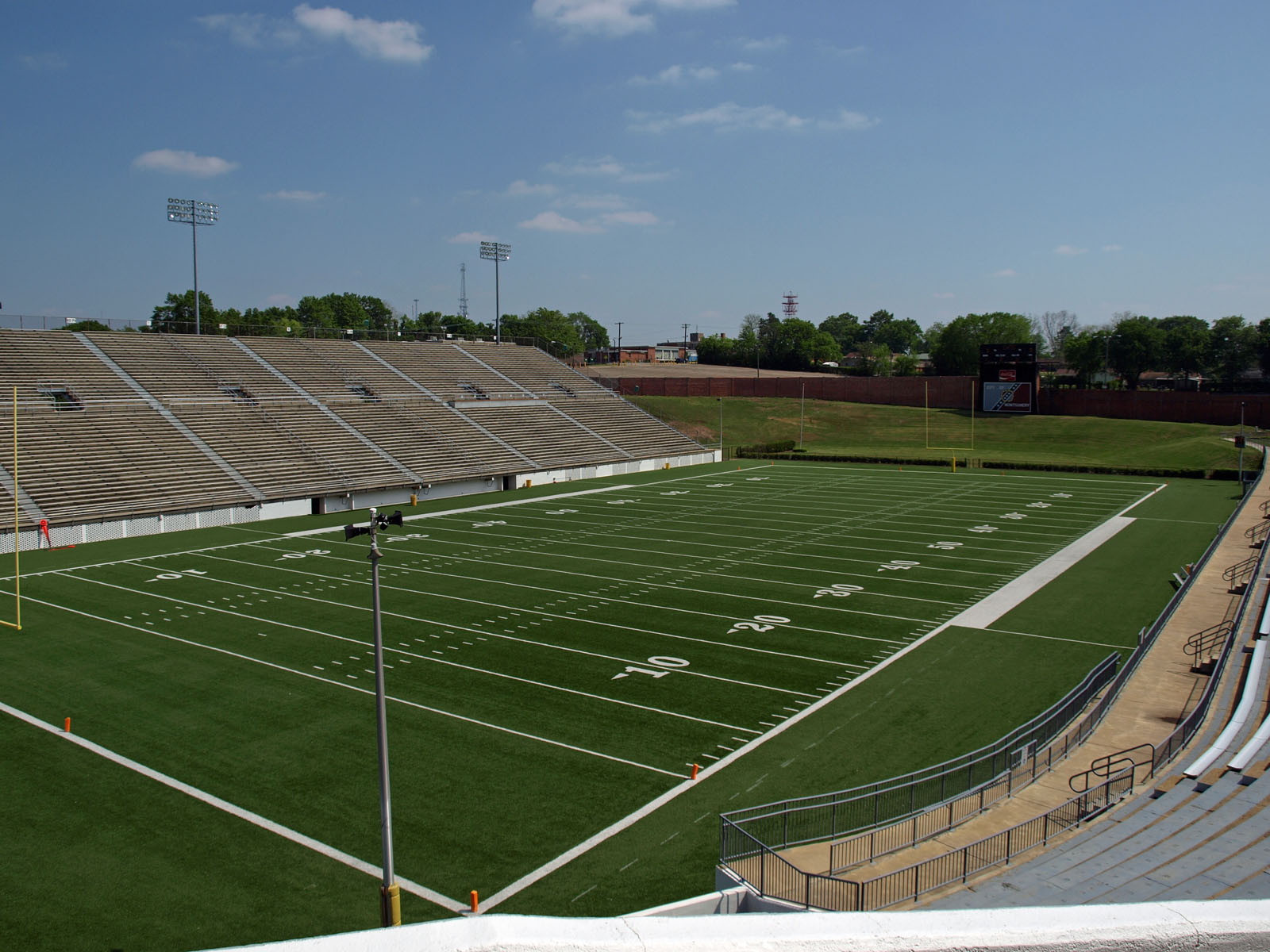
Cramton Bowl in 2009

=== Cramton Bowl ===
The Cramton Bowl provided for the fourth and final location of Alabama home games in the capital city. The Tide played home games at the Cramton Bowl in the 1922 through 1932 seasons, in 1934, between the 1944 through 1946 seasons and again between the 1951 through 1954 seasons. Alabama's all-time record at the Cramton Bowl was 17–3.

=== Highland Park ===
Highland Park provided for the second location of Alabama home games in the capital city. The Crimsons played home games at Highland in the 1901, 1903, and the 1907 seasons. Alabama's all-time record at Riverside was 1–0–2.

== Mobile ==
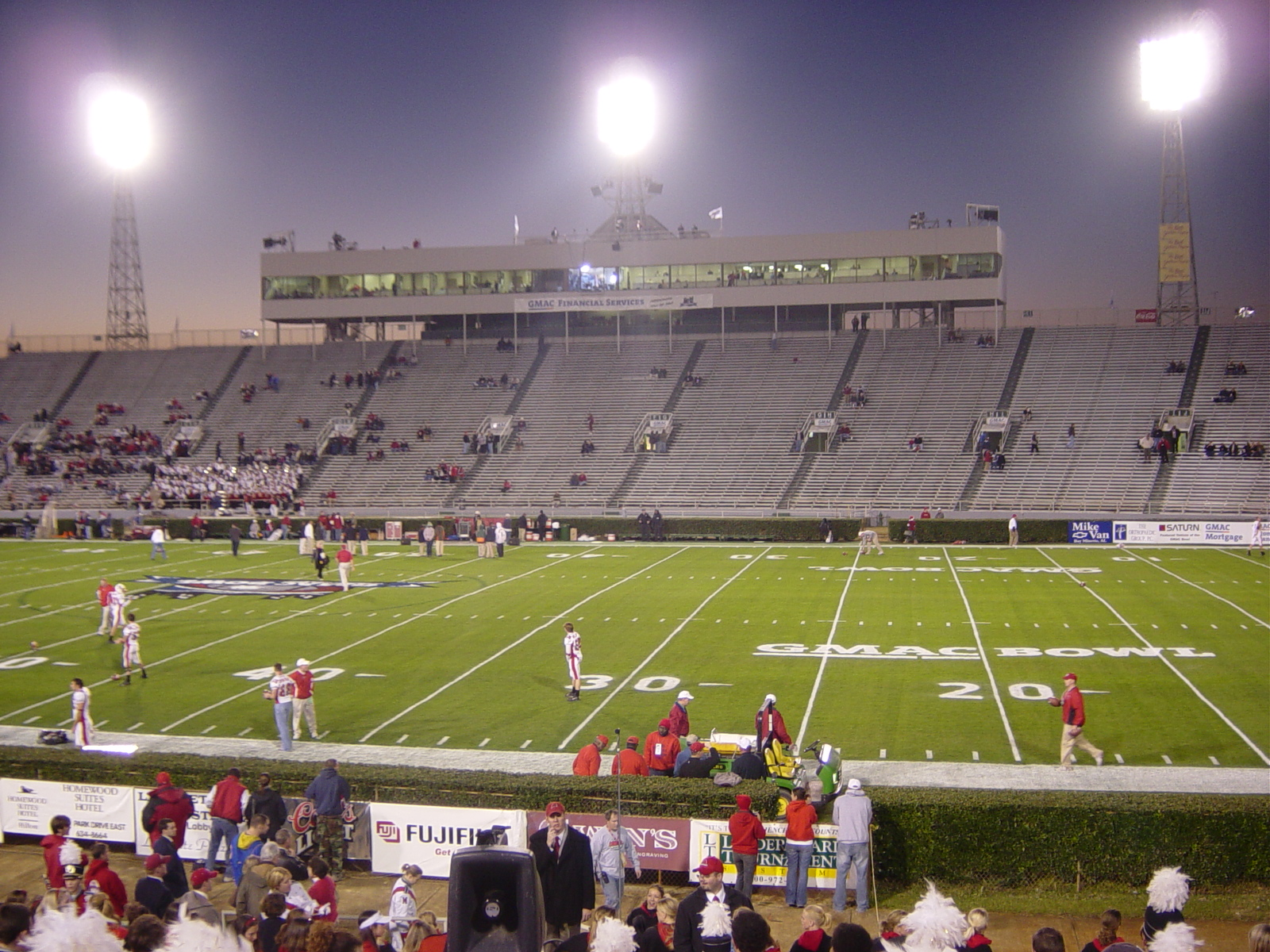
Ladd–Peebles Stadium in 2003

=== Ladd–Peebles Stadium ===
Opening for Crimson Tide football on October 2, 1948, Ladd–Peebles Stadium played host to Alabama through the 1948 and the 1959 seasons, the 1961 and the 1963 through the 1968 seasons. The Crimson Tide posted an all-time record at Ladd-Peebles Stadium of 10–7—2.

=== Murphy High School Stadium ===
Alabama opened the 1940 season in Mobile. In the first night game in Alabama football history, the Crimson Tide beat Spring Hill, 26–0, in front of 7,500 fans at the Murphy High School Stadium. The 1944 Alabama Crimson Tide football team hosted Ole Miss, on November 11, winning 34–6. The Crimson Tide posted an all-time record at Murphy Stadium of 2–0.

=== Monroe Park ===
Records of the 1907 season indicate that Alabama played LSU at Monroe Park in Mobile on November 23, defeating the Tigers, 6–4.
