= Gilbert Kelly =

American football player and coach (1878–1948)

Biographical details
- Born: July 23, 1878; Washington, D.C., U.S.
- Died: January 12, 1948 (aged 69); Chicago, Illinois, U.S.
- Education: Princeton University; Columbian University Law School

Coaching career (HC unless noted)
- 1901: Tennessee
- 1903: Central HS (DC)
- 1906–1907: Central HS (DC)

Head coaching record
- Overall: 3–3–2

Gilbert Walker Kelly (July 23, 1878 – January 12, 1948) was an American football coach. He served as the second head football coach at the University of Tennessee in 1901, compiling a record of 3–3–2.

== Biography ==
Kelly was born in Washington, D.C. on July 23, 1879 to Abner B. Kelly and Helen Elizabeth (Gilbert) Kelly. He attended Eastern High School. He entered Princeton in 1899 and graduated in 1901. He resumed his education at Columbian University and received his Bachelor of Laws degree in 1905.

In 1901, Kelly was the head football coach at the University of Tennessee. He taught at Central High School in Washington, D.C. from 1902 to 1908 and was the head football coach during the 1903, 1906, and 1907 seasons. From 1908 to 1910, he was the principal of East Aurora High School in Aurora, Illinois. He then joined Scott Foresman as an editor of educational publications, textbooks, etc. He died on January 12, 1948 in Chicago. At the time of his death, he was Scott Foresman's editor-in-chief.

== Head coaching record ==
Year	Team	Overall	Conference	Standing	Bowl/playoffs
Tennessee Volunteers (Southern Intercollegiate Athletic Association) (1901)
1901	Tennessee	3–3–2	1–1–2	11th	
Tennessee:		3–3–2	1–1–2		
Total:		3–3–2			
