= M. S. Harvey =

American college football player and coach (1881–1958)

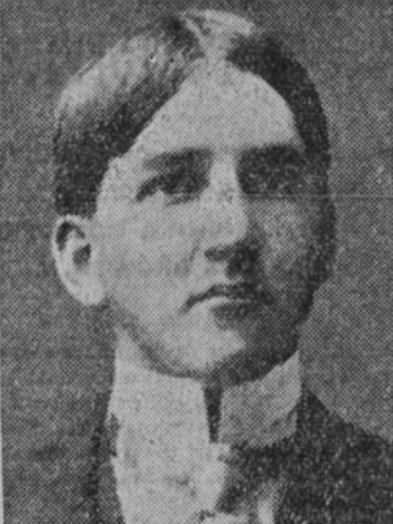
- Harvey pictured in The Birmingham Age-Herald, 1902

Biographical details
- Born: February 9, 1881; Russell County, Alabama, U.S.
- Died: June 3, 1958 (aged 77); Troup County, Georgia, U.S.

Playing career
- 1898–1900: Auburn
- Position: Tackle

Coaching career (HC unless noted)
- 1901: Alabama
- 1902: Auburn (assistant)
- 1902: Auburn
- 1903–1904: Ole Miss

Head coaching record
- Overall: 8–7–3

Michael Smith Harvey (February 9, 1881 – June 3, 1958) was an American college football player and coach. From 1898 to 1900, Harvey played tackle at Auburn. His older brother and younger brother also played for Auburn. In 1915, coach John Heisman selected him one of the 30 greatest Southern football players.

In 1898, Auburn beat Georgia 18 to 17, and Harvey's tackling stood out. In 1900, Auburn defeated Georgia 44 to 0. One account reads "The reason Georgia was defeated so badly by Auburn was due to the fact that Georgia had not only Auburn team to play against but Harvey as well."

He served as the head football coach at the University of Alabama in 1901, at Auburn University in 1902, and at the University of Mississippi (Ole Miss) from 1903 to 1904, and compiling a career head coaching record of 8–7–3. In 1901, Alabama played rival Tennessee for the first time. He was set to be the coach for Mercer in 1903, but resigned.

== Head coaching record ==
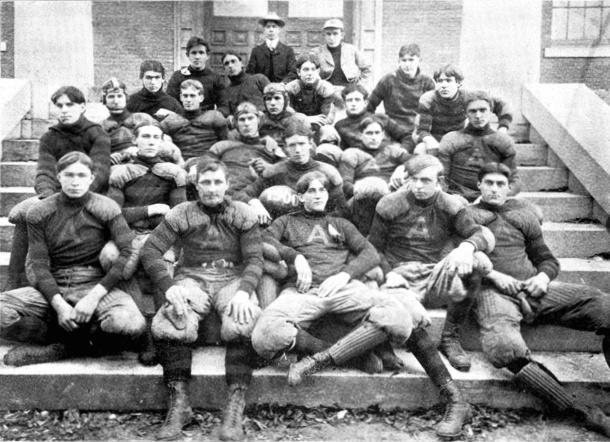
1900 Auburn team. Harvey in center of front row, with nose guard.

Year	Team	Overall	Conference	Standing	Bowl/playoffs
Alabama Crimson White (Southern Intercollegiate Athletic Association) (1901)
1901	Alabama	2–1–2	2–1–2		
Alabama:		2–1–2	2–1–2		
Auburn Tigers (Southern Intercollegiate Athletic Association) (1902)
1902	Auburn	0–2 (Note: Ralph S. Kent coached the first five games of the season.)	0–2		
Auburn:		0–2	0–2		
Ole Miss Rebels (Southern Intercollegiate Athletic Association) (1903–1904)
1903	Ole Miss	2–1–1	1–1–1		
1904	Ole Miss	4–3	2–3		
Ole Miss:		6–4–1	3–4–1		
Total:		8–7–3			
