= William Shibley =

American football player and coach (1876–1926)

Biographical details
- Born: October 7, 1876; Van Buren, Arkansas, U.S.
- Died: April 27, 1926 (aged 49); Miami-Dade County, Florida, U.S.

Playing career
- 1899: Virginia

Coaching career (HC unless noted)
- 1901: Ole Miss

Head coaching record
- Overall: 2–4

William Albert Shibley (October 7, 1876 – April 27, 1926) was an American football coach. He served as the head football coach at the University of Mississippi (Ole Miss) in 1901. During his one-season tenure at Ole Miss, Shibley compiled an overall record of two wins and four losses (2–4). Shibley was an alumnus of the University of Virginia. He played college football for the Virginia Cavaliers in 1899.

== Head coaching record ==
Year	Team	Overall	Conference	Standing	Bowl/playoffs
Ole Miss Rebels (Southern Intercollegiate Athletic Association) (1901)
1901	Ole Miss	2–4	0–4		
Ole Miss:		2–4	0–4		
Total:		2–4			
