= Simkins =

Simkins is a surname, and may refer to:

- David Simkins. American screenwriter and producer
- Eldred Simkins (1779–1831), American lawyer and politician from South Carolina; U.S. representative 1818–21
- Francis Butler Simkins (1897–1966), American historian
- Geoff Simkins (b. 1948), British jazz musician and saxophonist
- George Simkins Jr. (1924 – 2001). American dentist and civil rights activist.
- Greg "Craola" Simkins (b 1975) American artist.
- Modjeska Monteith Simkins (1899–1992), American civil rights leader
- Ormond Simkins (1879 – 1921) American football and baseball player
- Paris Simkins (1849-1930.African-American storekeeper, lawyer, minister, barber, and politician
- William Stewart Simkins (1842–1929), American law professor; said to have fired the first shot of the American Civil War
