= Joseph Ware =

Joseph Ware may refer to:

- Joseph Ware (cricketer) (1822–1868), English cricketer
- Joseph F. Ware Sr. (1880–1969), professor of military science and tactics
- Joe Ware (baseball) (1913–1994), American Negro league baseball player
- Joseph F. Ware Jr. (1916–2012), flight test engineer
