= 1901 College Football All-Southern Team =

American all-star college football team

Hunter Carpenter.

The 1901 College Football All-Southern Team consists of American football players selected to the College Football All-Southern Teams selected by various organizations in 1901. Vanderbilt won the SIAA championship. Most said Virginia ranked best in the south. Gallaudet, a school for deaf-mutes, also claimed a championship.

== Consensus selection ==
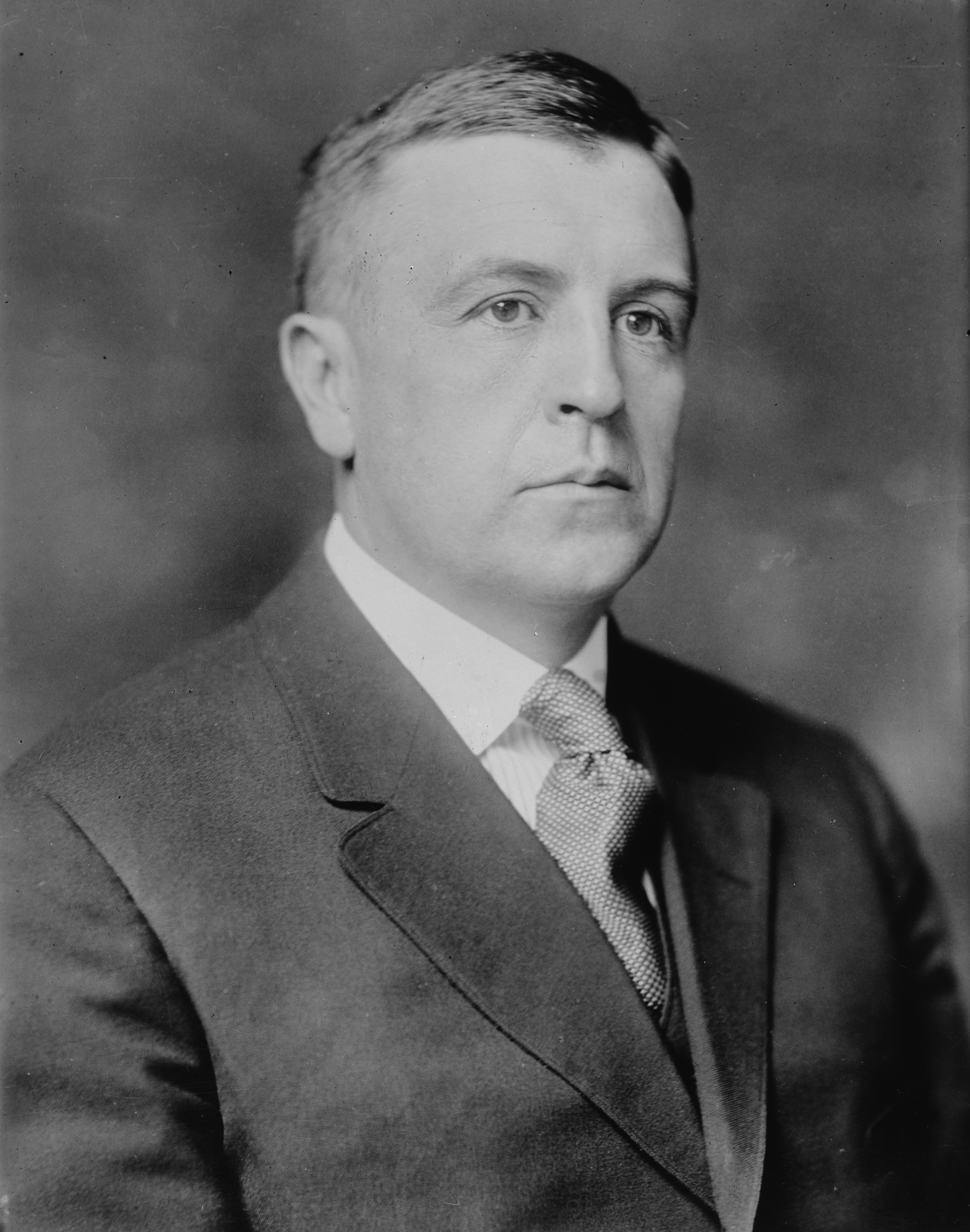
Christie Benet.

Those players who made both Outing's team and received mention by the Washington Post included:

- Christie Benet, tackle for Virginia. He was later a Senator for South Carolina.
- Hunter Carpenter, fullback for VPI. College Football Hall of Fame
- Robert M. Coleman, halfback for Virginia. A native of Lexington, Kentucky, Coleman first attended local Kentucky University, and later coached there.
- Gilbert O. Erickson, end for Gallaudet. He was a photographer and one of the founders of the National Literary Society of the Deaf.
- Percy Given, center for Georgetown. Georgetown authorities claimed it was Given, as opposed to Germany Schulz, who was the first "roving center" or linebacker in the game against Navy in 1902.
- Buck Harris, guard for Virginia. He was later a physician; an eye, ear, nose and throat specialist in Birmingham, Alabama.
- Hub McCormick, tackle for VPI. He was later an engineer.
- Ormond Simkins, fullback for Sewanee. His father William Stewart Simkins may have fired the first shot of the Civil War.
- Ed Tutwiler, quarterback for Virginia. He was the son of Confederate veteran and Birmingham industrialist Ed Tutwiler, Sr.
- Joe Ware, end for VPI. He was later a second lieutenant in World War I, and is buried in Arlington National Cemetery.

== All-Southerns of 1901 ==
=== Ends ===
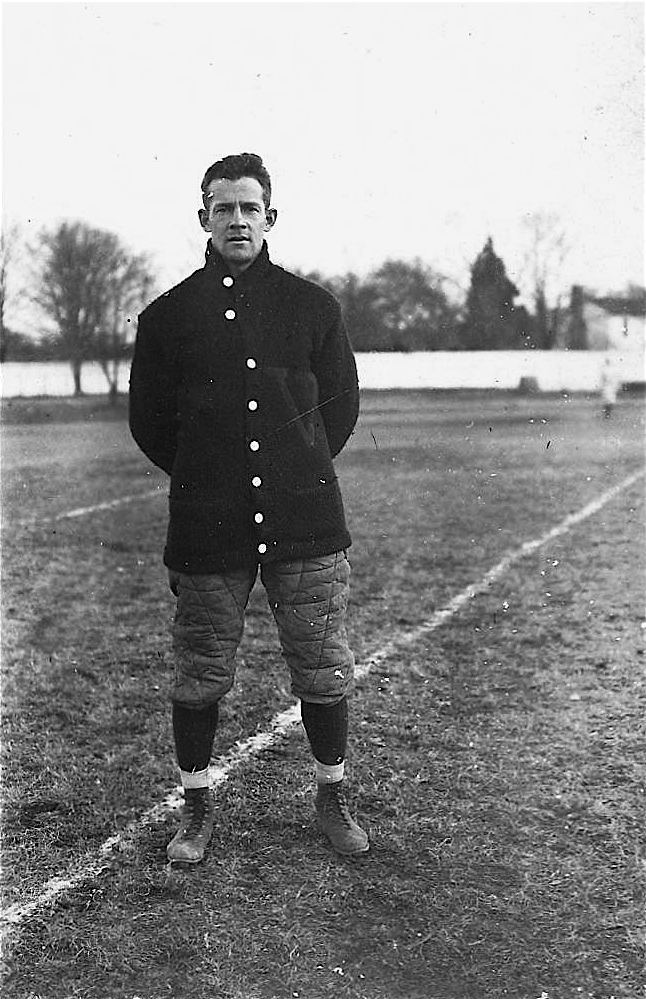
Joe Ware

- Joe Ware†, VPI (WP, O)
- Gilbert O. Erickson, Gallaudet (WP, O)
- Alexis Hobson, Virginia (WP-s)
- Sam Edmonston, Georgetown (WP-s)
- Frank M. Ridley, Georgia

=== Tackles ===
- W. Christie Benet†, Virginia (WP, O)
- Hub McCormick, VPI (WP-s, O)
- Lew Drill, Georgetown (WP)
- Bradley Walker, Virginia (WP-s)

=== Guards ===
- Buck Harris†, Virginia (WP, O)
- Branch Johnson, VMI (WP)
- Alvin Lee Abbott, VPI (O)
- Joe Lynch, Georgetown (WP-s)
- Frank Kearns, Georgetown (WP-s)

=== Centers ===
- Percy Given†, Georgetown (WP, O)
- H. Dorsey Waters, Virginia (WP-s)

=== Quarterbacks ===
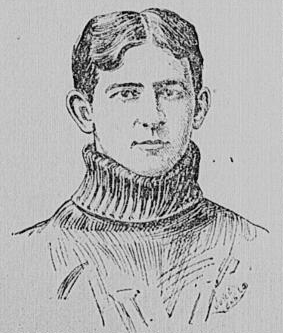
Robert Coleman.

- Ed Tutwiler†, Virginia (WP, O)
- Kit DeCamps, VPI (WP-s)

=== Halfbacks ===
- Robert M. Coleman†, Virginia (WP, O)
- Ormond Simkins, Sewanee (WP-s, O)
- Hub Hart, Georgetown (WP)
- John Counselman, VPI (WP-s)

=== Fullbacks ===
- Hunter Carpenter†, VPI (College Football Hall of Fame) (WP, O)
- Albert Carr, North Carolina (WP-s)

== Key ==
Bold = consensus choice by a majority of the selectors

† = Unanimous selection

WP = posted by Oscar P. Schmidt in The Washington Post, selected by M. J. Thompson, graduate manager of athletics at Georgetown University and Richard Armstrong, formerly of Yale. It had a second team referred to as substitutes.

O = selected by Caspar Whitney in Outing.
