= Joe Palumbo =

Joe Palumbo may refer to:

- Joe Palumbo (American football) (1929–2013), American football guard
- Joe Palumbo (baseball) (born 1994), American professional baseball pitcher
