= Virginia Cavaliers football =

College football team representing the University of Virginia

2026 Virginia Cavaliers football team
- First season: 1887; 139 years ago
- Athletic director: Carla Williams
- General manager: Justin Speros
- Head coach: Tony Elliott; 5th season, 27–31 (.466)
- Location: Charlottesville, Virginia
- Stadium: Scott Stadium (capacity: 61,500)
- Field: Carl Smith Center, home of David A. Harrison III Field
- NCAA division: Division I FBS
- Conference: ACC
- Colors: Orange and blue
- All-time record: 703–657–48 (.516)
- Bowl record: 9–13 (.409)

Conference championships
- SAIAA: 1914, 1915 ACC: 1989, 1995

Division championships
- ACC Coastal: 2019
- Consensus All-Americans: 11
- Rivalries: Duke (rivalry); Florida State (rivalry); Maryland (rivalry); North Carolina (rivalry); Virginia Tech (rivalry); William & Mary

Uniforms
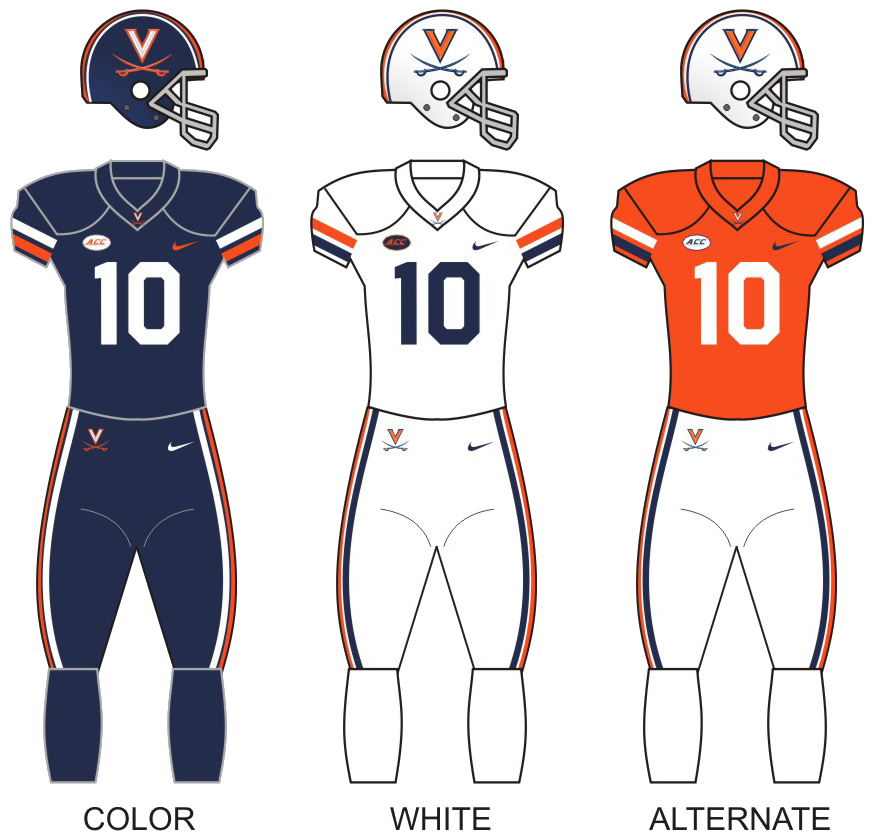
- Mascot: Cavalier (CavMan)
- Marching band: Cavalier Marching Band
- Outfitter: Nike
- Website: virginiasports.com

The Virginia Cavaliers football team represents the University of Virginia (UVA) in the sport of American football. Established in 1887, Virginia plays its home games at Scott Stadium, capacity 61,500, which sits directly adjacent to the World Heritage Site portion of its campus featuring the historic Academical Village. UVA played an outsized role in the shaping of the modern game's ethics and eligibility rules, as well as its safety rules after a Georgia Bulldogs fullback died during a 17–4 Virginia victory in 1897.

Quickly asserting itself as the South's first great program with 28 straight winning seasons after its first in 1887, Virginia football won 12 Southern championships in 20 seasons and became the first Southern program to defeat 26-time national champions Yale, 10–0, at the Yale Bowl in 1915. James Howell Power Ratings retroactively found UVA to be the national champions for 1915, though these ratings have never been recognized in any NCAA record book. Virginia does not officially claim the title but other notable programs have claimed national titles for these early years of college football using Howell's ratings.

During this period, Virginia established enduring rivalries, including the South's Oldest Rivalry with North Carolina and a heated rivalry with Virginia Tech. The team also faced William & Mary regularly since 1908. (Note: Such as in the periods of 1908–1912, 1935–1940, 1959–1964, 1986–1995, and 2009–Present before and after the Tribe joined the Football Championship Subdivision in 1978; a mid-century alumni letter to Pres. Darden identified "VPI, William & Mary, [and] Carolina" as Virginia's natural rivals.)

Virginia lost its mantle as the region's mark of success between World War I and World War II, but soon thereafter Art Guepe had Virginia winning big again. To avoid the trappings of "big-time football", (Note: at a time the Ivy League was forming to formally prohibit scholarships and recruiting at the power programs of the Northeast. Those eight schools had previously won dozens of football national championships even as recently as 1950.) university president Colgate Darden reduced scholarship and recruiting support, argued against joining the ACC, and declined an invite for 8–1 Virginia to play unbeaten Georgia Tech in the 1952 Orange Bowl. The Board of Visitors voted to join the ACC anyway, but Guepe left for Vanderbilt and under Dick Voris Virginia embarked on a 28-game losing streak from 1958 to 1960, as Darden retired. Voris left with a record of 1–29, his lone victory a 15–12 home win against Duke. Still limited by a relative lack of funding or administrative interest in those times, his successors managed moderately better records through the 1960s and 1970s.

George Welsh led a turnaround effort from 1982, and took Virginia to its first dozen bowl games and its first AP No. 1 ranking for several weeks in October 1990. He was the first ACC coach to reach 100 wins, and retired in 2000 with the most ACC wins (his 85 ranking second to Bobby Bowden as of 2025) of any coach in history. In November 1995, similar to winning the first Southern victory against Yale 80 years prior, Virginia was the first ACC team to defeat Bowden's Florida State teams after they started 29–0 in the conference. The nationally televised event led FSU's president to create the Jefferson–Eppes Trophy.

Virginia set a school record with 11 wins in 2025, and has played in two ACC Championship Games as well as four Peach Bowls and an Orange Bowl, Sugar Bowl, and Citrus Bowl among its 22 bowl appearances. The Cavaliers have produced 11 Consensus All-Americans and 12 NFL Pro Bowlers—Ronde Barber, Tiki Barber, "Bullet Bill" Dudley, D'Brickashaw Ferguson, Thomas Jones, Henry Jordan, Patrick Kerney, Heath Miller, Herman Moore, Matt Schaub, Tom Scott, and Chris Slade.

== History ==
=== Early history (1887–1911) ===
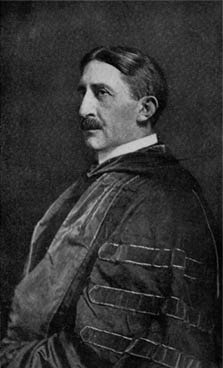
Former University of Virginia President Edwin Alderman

UVA football began in the fall of 1886, when two graduate students at the university, former Yale student Charles Willcox who was attending medical school at UVA, and former Princeton student, Richard Reid Rogers who matriculated to the law school, introduced the sport. After seeing the success of Princeton and Yale during their undergraduate careers, these two men brought a knowledge of the sport to the South, an area of the country that had no college football teams. Students at UVA began playing pickup games of the kicking-style of football as early as 1870. In 1874, University students were introduced to the sport of rugby when they played to a scoreless tie against a team of Englishmen from Albemarle County. Eight years later, in November 1883, a football club was reorganized, a constitution drawn up, and officers elected. 75 men competed against one another, but not against another collegiate club. The University Literary magazine described how "pluck is cultivated by throttling one's competitor and violently throwing him to the ground." Finally, in the fall of 1887, Willcox and Reid, after garnering interest in their fellow students throughout the year, helped Virginia put its first regularly organized team in the field. But in these early days they had had no one to play. Fortunately, Pantops Academy, a boys' school founded just up the road from the UVA Grounds, agreed to a game on November 13, 1887. After playing to a scoreless tie, a rematch was scheduled for March 1888. The historic first touchdown was scored by quarterback Herbert Barry and the University won 26–0. The following season, on December 8, 1888, UVA would play their first intercollegiate game, a 26–0 loss to Johns Hopkins. The loss did not dampen their enthusiasm for the sport. Virginia returned the favor with a 58–0 drubbing of Hopkins the following season when they went 4–2, with a 180–4 margin in its victories and two close losses to an eight-win Lehigh team and Navy. The 1889, 1890, 1892, 1893, 1894, 1895, 1896, and 1897 teams all claim Southern championships. The 116–0 drubbing by Princeton in 1890 signaled football's arrival in the South. The South's Oldest Rivalry started in 1892, when Virginia split games with North Carolina. The 1897 team had a scoreless tie with Vanderbilt in a game billed as the championship of the South. Serving as early as 1892, the school's first athletic director was William Lambeth, a medical professor at the university, and one of the participants in the major rules committees that were enacted to make football a safer sport. The trend was not welcome in all corners, however, according to University historian Philip Alexander Bruce, who wrote disparagingly of the arrival of "professional athletes in disguise" from all over the country. School President Edwin Alderman, though a tireless proponent of college football, was significantly alarmed to appoint an investigating committee in 1904, and a strict athletic code was written in 1906.

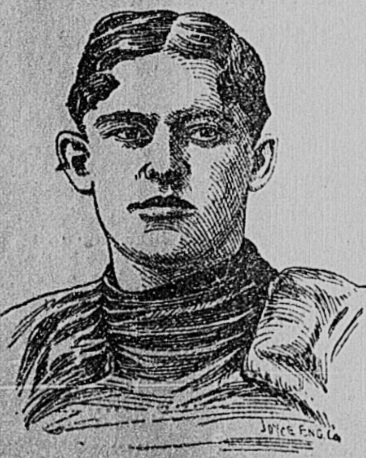
Bradley Walker

Between 1900 and 1915 Virginia saw coaches change 10 times and achieve 10 winning seasons with help from the likes of tackle John Loyd, fullback Bradley Walker, quarterback Robert Kent Gooch and the South's first consensus All-American in halfback Eugene N. "Buck" Mayer. The 1900, 1901, 1902, 1908, 1914, and 1915 teams claim Southern championships. In 1900 the team gave the Sewanee Tigers its first loss since 1897. The team's captain was tackle John Loyd. Virginia lost to Pop Warner's Carlisle Indians. Bradley Walker, later a Nashville attorney and prominent referee, once grabbed Hawley Pierce, Carlisle's biggest player, and carried him ten yards with him dangling over his shoulder. Work began in 1901 on 21-acre (85,000 m^{2}) Lambeth Field, propelling sports development at UVA. Along with Walker, "one of the all-time greats in Southern athletic history," the 1901 team featured several prominent players, including tackle Christie Benet, later a United States senator for South Carolina, future physicians guard Buck Harris and halfback Robert M. Coleman, and quarterback Ed Tutwiler, a transfer from Alabama and the son of industrialist and New Market cadet Edward Magruder Tutwiler. The 1901 team defeated Gallaudet, but lost to Georgetown, and so both Gallaudet and Virginia claim titles. The 1902 team beat Carlisle. In 1905, Virginia lost to VPI for the first time, in Hunter Carpenter's senior year. The 1908 team suffered a single scoreless tie to Sewanee. Freshman Archer Christian was trampled to death in the Georgetown game.

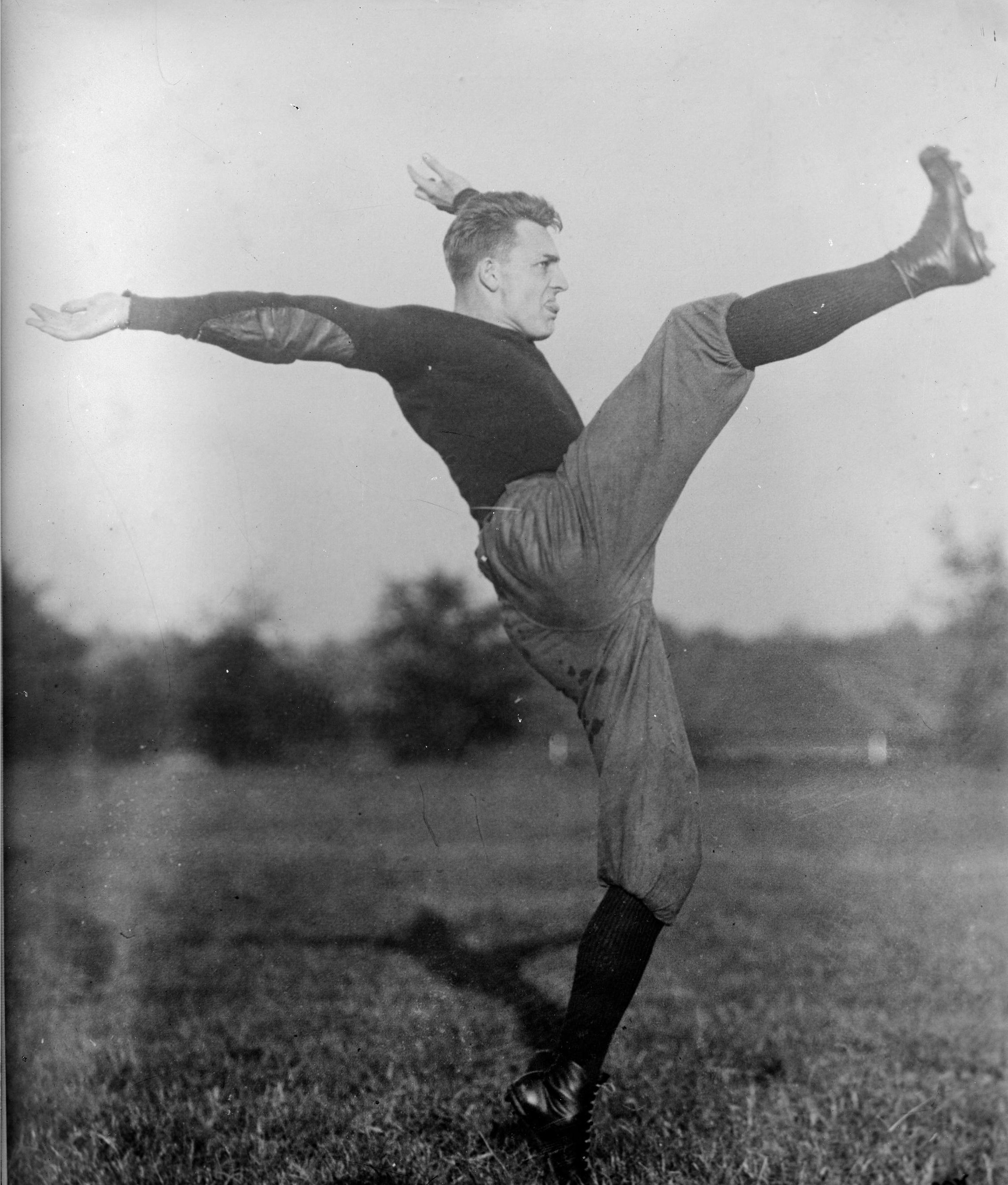
Buck Mayer in 1915

=== SAIAA (1912–1921) ===
1912 featured Virginia in the inaugural South Atlantic Intercollegiate Athletic Association (SAIAA) season. Season tickets were $7.50 for students and $9.50 for alumni when 8,000-seat Lambeth Stadium opened in 1913, with a price tag of $35,000. The season began with three home shutout victories for Virginia, followed later in the season by a home game with Vanderbilt that was billed as The Football Classic of the South. Trainloads of alumni rolled into Charlottesville to watch Virginia crush the Commodores, 34–0, at Lambeth's dedication.

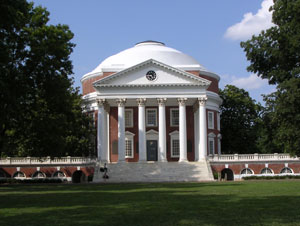
The Rotunda

For years hence, it was traditional to designate "a greatest home game" each season. In 1914, it was Georgia—a "Rally 'Round the Rotunda" won by UVA, 28–0, in a drizzle, as Robert Kent Gooch "general-led his men with rare ability", the Alumni News gushed. Betting was heavy on Yale for a 1915 game that ranked as the biggest all-time win at that stage of Virginia's history. No Southern team had ever defeated the Ivy League power until Virginia—led by quarterback Norborne Berkeley and Buck Mayer—won 10–0 in New Haven. Headlines in the Charlottesville Daily Progress read, "Yale Bowl a Soup Tureen—Virginia Eleven Serves Dish of Bulldog Stew!" The 1915 Virginia team was also the only team to beat the "point-a-minute" Commodores. The season's only loss was 9–0 on the road at Harvard. Harvard's only loss was to national champion Cornell. Halfback Eugene N. "Buck" Mayer was the South's first consensus All-American. The university's first-ever losing football season occurred the next year, including a 61–3 payback at Yale. "Played them too early in the season", moaned a 1916 Alumni News. Questions about the role of athletics were cast aside in 1917, dwarfed by a larger battlefront now known as World War I. Athletics were curtailed in 1917 and 1918 "in an effort to adapt this University to the stern necessities of a people at war", according to the Corks & Curls.

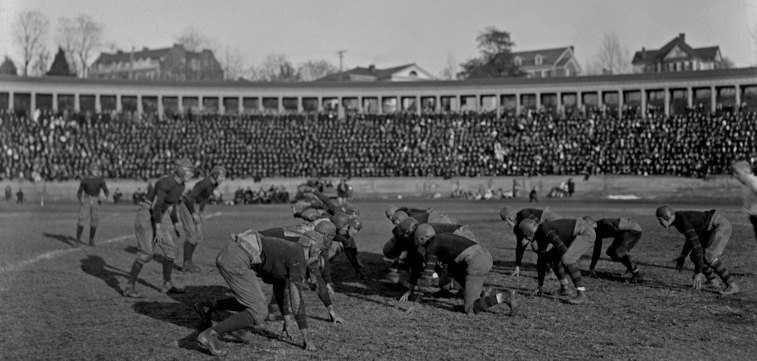
UVA vs. Vandy, 1919

The war ended, enrollment began to rebuild, and football practice resumed in 1919 with only two lettermen. "All Trains Lead to Charlottesville!" proclaimed posters promoting the "Great Post War Gathering of Virginia Alumni" for the November 15, 1919, home game with Vanderbilt. UVA lost, 10–6, and dropped the traditional Thanksgiving Day game with North Carolina to finish the "start-up" season at 2–5–2.

In December 1919, Dr. Rice Warren was hired as coach in 1920. Warren led the 1920 squad to a 5–2–2 record.

=== Southern Conference (1922–1936) ===
UVA also joined the Southern Intercollegiate Athletic Association in 1920, but left with many SIAA teams to form the Southern Conference in 1921. Rice Warren's tenure ended before the 1922 season, and new coach Thomas Campbell guided the team to a 4–4–1 record—not so mediocre considering the '21 team had managed only three points in its final four games. Virginia was a charter member of the Southern Conference in 1921, when it and 13 other schools split from the Southern Intercollegiate Athletic Association. University teams became the Virginia Cavaliers around 1923, and the leader of the first "official Cavs" was Earle "Greasy" Neale. Although his 1923 record was 3–5–1, his teams enjoyed winning records from 1924–27 before falling to 2–6–1 in 1928. Student indifference ran high, participation ran low, and Neale resigned after the 1928 season. Earl Abell took the football reins for two years in the midst of another athletic department reshuffle. The position of athletic director was created, and James G. Driver — a three-year letterman at UVA — was named Athletic Director. Lambeth Field was outgrown by the spring of 1930, as varsity and first-year teams in football, baseball, track, and lacrosse attempted to practice there. UVA historian Virginius Dabney related that spring football workouts were stopped due to the javelins and discus throwers. The university began negotiating to obtain land for a new sports site, and plans were finalized for Scott Stadium to open in October 1931. Land for practice fields between Ivy Road and the C&O Railroad tracks also was acquired. Support for UVA football had become spasmodic—even fraternity brothers were betting openly against the Cavaliers—around 1930, but in 1931, a dynamic new coach named Fred Dawson buoyed spirits. Losing seasons and a lack of athletic scholarships took a toll on Dawson's enthusiasm, however, and he quit after 1933 and was succeeded by Gus Tebell.

Just as frustrated at the dearth of notable wins was university president Edwin Anderson Alderman, who impaneled a committee to study the situation. In 1935 the Southern Conference implemented the Graham Plan, named after the Frank Porter Graham, head of the University of North Carolina system (which included University of North Carolina Tar Heels football and N.C. State Wolf Pack football). The Graham Plan committed the Southern Conference to eliminating any form of subsidization for student athletes that was not available to regular students.

=== Frank Murray era (1937–1945) ===
The Cavaliers opted to leave the Southern Conference at the end of the 1936 football season, the year the Graham Plan went into effect. Tebell bowed out after three losing seasons, and was succeeded in 1937 by Frank Murray as the Cavaliers began its status as independent (from conference affiliation). Although the Cavaliers went 2–7 during Murray's first year, the team was undefeated against state teams in 1938, posting a 4–4–1 record, creating near hysteria in the student body.

The 1940s were a time of mixed success for the Cavaliers—largely thanks to the large numbers of students who served in the armed forces—but it was also known as the era of "Bullet Bill." William McGarvey Dudley, a 168-pounder from Bluefield, Virginia, is often called the best ever to wear a Virginia uniform. Dudley, who wore jersey number 35, ran, passed, kicked, blocked, tackled, and intercepted his way to All America honors. Under Murray, the 1940 team—running out of a T-formation—went 4–5, but improved to 8–1 in 1941, the only loss a 21–19 upset at Yale. In his final game as a Cavalier, Dudley scored 22 points at North Carolina in a Thanksgiving classic broadcast nationally. After a 28–7 UVA win, his teammates carried him off the field. Dudley finished fifth in the 1941 Heisman Trophy balloting.

Murray's 1942 squad dropped to 2–6–1, having lost 29 players to graduation and "scholarshipping for Uncle Sam." Until the war ended in 1945, UVA football functioned with makeshift teams—guest stars from other schools enrolled in the university's military units and were thus eligible to play. In spite of a 7–2 season, Frank Murray left, succeeded in 1946 by Art Guepe, who coached seven years with a winning record. Murray would later be inducted in the College Football Hall of Fame as a coach.

=== Art Guepe era (1946–1952) ===
In 1947, Virginia defeated Harvard, 47–0, with a team that featured John Papit, George Neff, and Bob "Rock" Weir. The game was significant because UVA was facing its first-ever black player—Harvard's Chester Pierce.

The gridiron success of the late 1940s continued into the early 1950s, as Guepe teams—with Papit, Joe Palumbo, and Tom Scott winning All-America honors—lost only five games from 1950 through 1952. The Guepe years ended after the 1952 season, when the coach was wooed away by Vanderbilt in the wake of University President Colgate Darden's refusal to allow Virginia to participate in any postseason football play.

Virginia had just escaped being banned permanently from the NCAA for granting athletic scholarships to student athletes, which was illegal at that time. The NCAA's "Sanity Rules" mandated that college athletes were required to work for their tuition, though this rule was often openly flouted (for instance, prior to the 1950 Rose Bowl, it was revealed that at least 16 Ohio State Buckeye football players had cushy jobs with the state of Ohio, including a running back on the payroll of the state's transportation department as a tire inspector). President Darden made a principled argument against the statute, noting the example of teams such as Ohio State, and stated unequivocally that his school had no intention of following the Code as it enabled the powerhouse schools of the Big Ten and SEC to ignore academics and essentially pay to retain football talent. While UVA (along with traditional UVA rivals Virginia Polytechnic Institute, Maryland, and Boston College) escaped being banned from NCAA play, President Darden was concerned about the effect of "big time football" on the academical status of the university.

After the 1951 football season, in which UVA only lost one game, the Virginia Cavaliers found themselves invited to the Orange Bowl, which President Darden promptly declined, setting a precedent not broken for thirty years. Also in 1951, professor Robert Gooch wrote the "Gooch Report", which requested that UVA abolish its football program and discontinue giving athletic scholarships. While President Darden was opposed to entirely abolishing the football program or athletic scholarships, he did diminish the number of athletic scholarships given by 80%. This resulted in the departure of Coach Guepe and a series of losing seasons by the football team.

=== ACC membership and struggles (1953–1981) ===
Heated arguments ensued about whether Virginia should join the Atlantic Coast Conference. Athletic Director and former football coach Gus Tebell and President Darden differed sharply—Tebell in favor, Darden worried about the league's academic standards and the belief that Virginia should only align with other Virginia schools—and the Board of Visitors backed Tebell. Virginia was admitted into the ACC on December 4, 1953.

The first 9 years in the ACC brought 9 losing seasons and a 28-game losing streak (equaling the second worst in NCAA FBS history), lasting from the third game of 1958 until the opening game of 1961. The streak ended in front of 18,000 fans in Scott Stadium on opening day of the 1961 season. Virginia beat William & Mary 21–6. In 1970, George Blackburn's last year, UVA's football program was integrated for the first time, with the signing of Harrison Davis, Stanley Land, Kent Merritt, and John Rainey. Blackburn was replaced by Don Lawrence, who suffered through three consecutive losing seasons between 1971 and 1973. Lawrence was succeeded by Sonny Randle, UVA '59. AstroTurf was laid at Scott Stadium in May 1974 and the team still had a losing season, going 4–7.

After a disastrous 1–10 season in 1975, Athletic Director Eugene Corrigan fired Randle and hired Dick Bestwick in 1976. Bestwick proved to be popular with players, alumni, and faculty until the team suffered five losing seasons in six years. Bestwick was dismissed by Athletic Director Dick Schultz after the 1981 season.

=== George Welsh era (1982–2000) ===
Head Coach George Welsh was hired for the start of the 1982 season, leaving the same position at the U.S. Naval Academy. He spent years as an assistant coach under Joe Paterno at Penn State and brought a winning tradition in his 19 years at the helm. After going 2–9 and 6–5 in his first two campaigns, Welsh guided the Cavaliers to an 8–2–2 season in 1984 with a 27–24 Peach Bowl win over Purdue representing UVA's first-ever bowl appearance and win.

Many UVA firsts continued under George Welsh:

- First-ever unanimous All-America choice—1985, offensive tackle Jim Dombrowski
- First 10-win season—1989, 10–3
- First ACC Championship—1989
- First time ranked No. 1—1990, 4 weeks
- First team to beat Florida State in ACC play—1995

In 1985 and 1986, the Cavaliers did not go to bowl games. In 1987, they started 3–4 but would win the last five games to finish 8–4 with an All-American Bowl win over BYU. In 1988, the Cavaliers started 2–4 but would win their last five games to finish 7–4 with no bowl game. The 1989 season was the greatest season in school history, with a record of 10–3 overall, and the winning of the program's first ACC co-championship. Virginia would go on to lose the Florida Citrus Bowl, the first New Year's Day bowl in school history. Virginia, wearing new uniforms for the first time in 10 years and only the second time in head coach George Welsh's tenure, enjoyed one of the finest seasons in their history in 1994. Most noticeably, the team switched from white helmets with orange and blue stripes down the middle to dark blue helmets with a "V" over two crossed sabres on the sides. The V-Sabre logo was designed by Coach Welsh's son Matt. The rest of the uniform changed from predominantly orange and white to predominantly blue and white. Representing a major athletic facility improvement, the artificial turf at Scott Stadium was removed and replaced with natural grass before the start of the 1995 season. Artificial turf was first installed at Scott Stadium in 1974. David A. Harrison III Field was dedicated September 2, 1995, at Virginia's home opener against William & Mary. In 1995, the Cavaliers won their second ACC title. Citing concerns about his health as a primary reason for his decision, Welsh announced his retirement in a press conference on December 11, 2000, where he said simply "I am now, and forever will be, a Wahoo." Welsh stepped down at Virginia at the age of 67 after establishing himself as the winningest coach in UVA and ACC history. He compiled a 19-year record of 134–86–3 at Virginia, including a conference-record 80 ACC wins. Welsh led the Cavaliers to 12 bowl games and 14 consecutive years of winning at least 7 games.

=== Al Groh era (2001–2009) ===
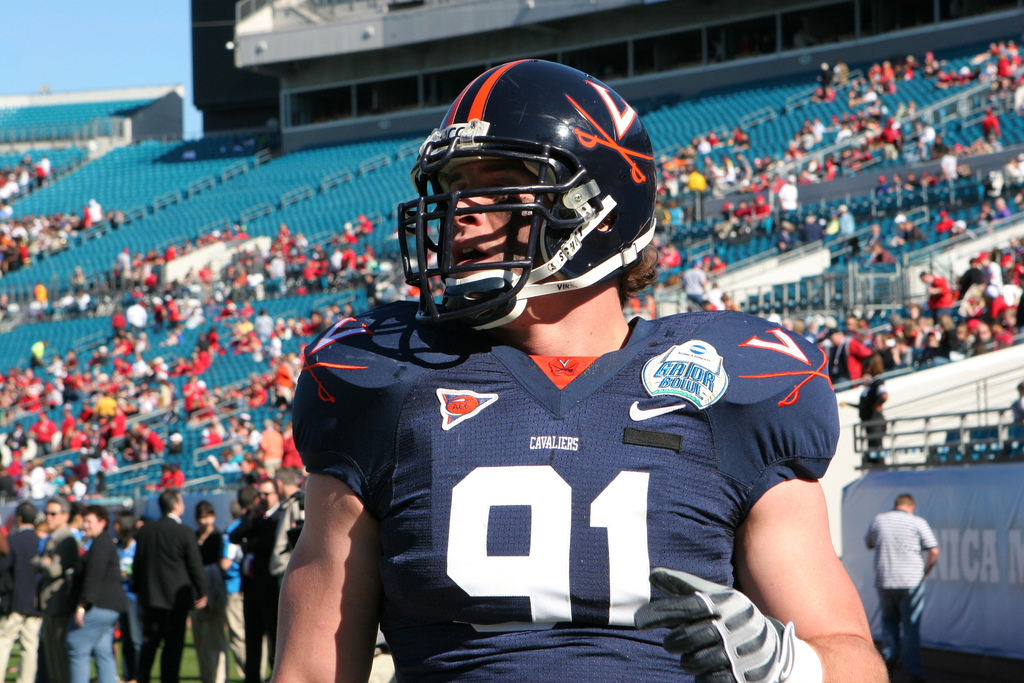
Chris Long at UVA (2008)

With the retirement of a UVA legend, the Virginia faithful were looking for a new coach who could bring the same success to the team that George Welsh maintained throughout his tenure. After Florida State University's Offensive Coordinator Mark Richt accepted the position as head coach of the University of Georgia, initial speculation centered on former Penn State University Defensive Coordinator Jerry Sandusky, with only Sandusky and Richt being interviewed before, on December 30, 2000, Virginia hired New York Jets head coach and former Virginia player Al Groh. His first year was a rebuilding year with the team going 5–7. Groh then led the Cavaliers to four consecutive winning seasons from 2002 to 2005, including a 3–1 record in bowl games. The 2002 squad saw the breakout season of quarterback Matt Schaub, who led the Cavaliers to a 9–5 season capped by a 48–22 blowout of No. 12 West Virginia in the Continental Tire Bowl. The 2003 team faced adversity with an early season injury to Schaub, but the team rallied to finish the year 8–5, including a victory over Pittsburgh in the 2003 Continental Tire Bowl. The 2004 team reached No. 6 in national polls after a 5–0 start, the Cavaliers' highest ranking since 1990, but they lost 36–3 at No. 7 Florida State and finished 8–4 after an upset loss to Fresno State in the MPC Computers Bowl. The 2005 team finished with a 7–5 record, but included Virginia's second-ever victory over Florida State and a win over Minnesota in the Music City Bowl. The 2006 squad's record slipped to 5–7. In 2007, the team went 9–3 for the season, including a 48–0 shutout of the University of Miami in the Hurricanes' last home game in the Orange Bowl Stadium, as well as setting an NCAA record for wins by two points or fewer (five). Gaining an invitation to Jacksonville, Florida, for the Gator Bowl, they subsequently lost 28–31 to Texas Tech. For 2008, the team started with several big losses, but went on to win four games in a row before losing the last four of the season, finishing 5–7. Virginia's 2009 campaign under Groh started with a stunning 26–14 loss to William & Mary of the FCS (formerly I-AA). It was UVA's first loss to a I-AA team since losing to William & Mary 41–37 in 1986. The 2009 team ended 3–9 and Groh was fired following the last game of the season, a loss against rival Virginia Tech.

=== Mike London era (2010–2015) ===
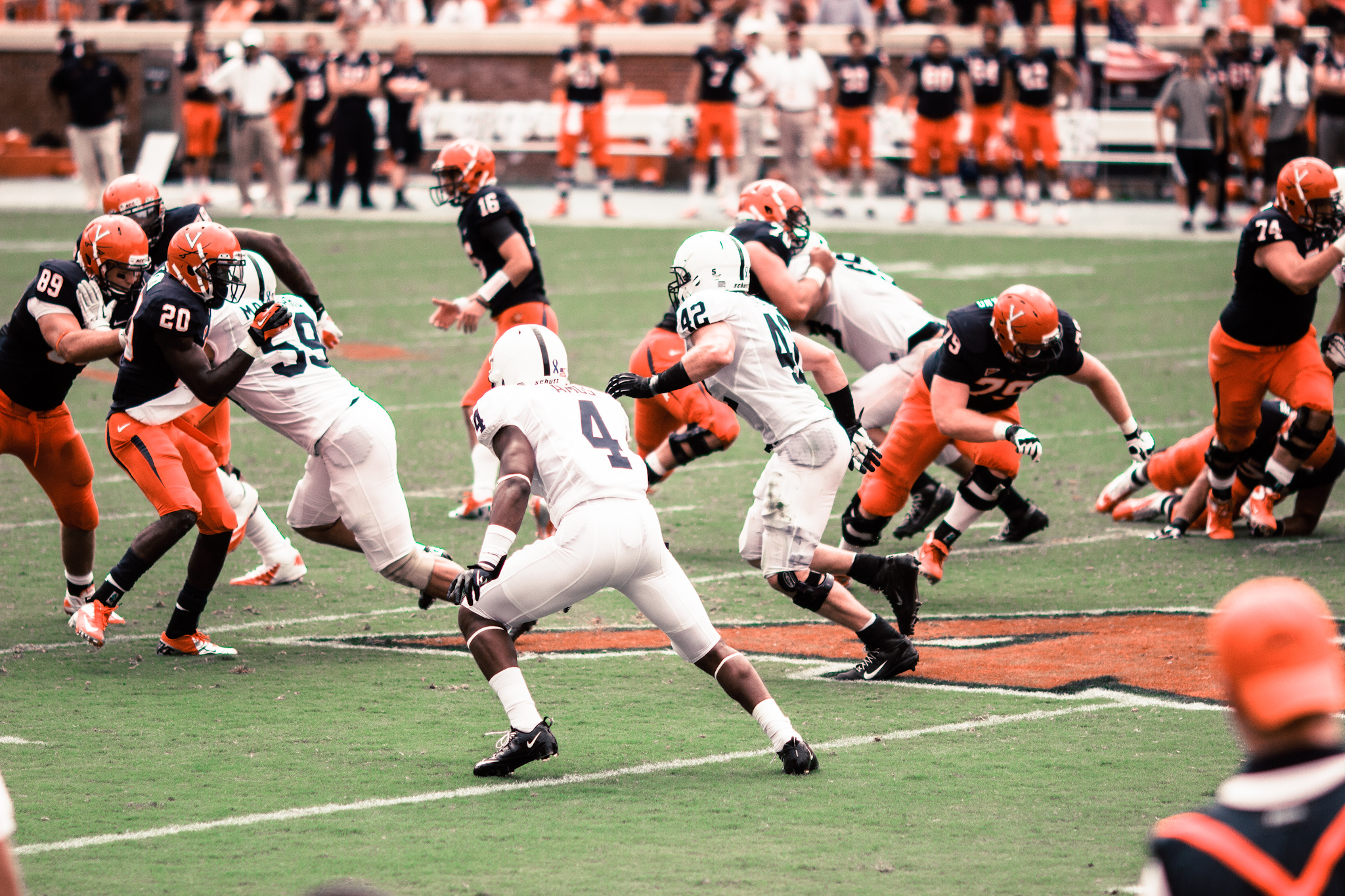
The Cavaliers play against the Penn State Nittany Lions in 2012 in Scott Stadium.

Mike London was named head coach of the Cavaliers on December 7, 2009. London, who was previously head coach at the University of Richmond, was an assistant coach under Al Groh from 2001–04 and again from 2006–07. London became one of only 10 black head coaches at the Division I-A level. In his first season with the Cavs, the team went 4–8 overall and 1–7 in conference play. He followed that up with an 8–4 (5–3 ACC) turnaround season, following which he won the ACC Coach of the Year award, after preseason projections had Virginia finishing fifth in the ACC Coastal Division. The 2011 team registered a win at Florida State for the first time in school history and became the first team in FBS history to win games at Miami and Florida State in the same season. The team earned a bid to the 2011 Chick-fil-A Bowl, where they lost to Auburn 43–24. In 2012, the team suffered a disappointing 4–8 season that resulted in the dismissal of four assistant coaches. Prior to the start of the 2013 season, both starting quarterbacks from the year before, Michael Rocco and Phillip Sims, transferred from Virginia, going to Richmond and Winston-Salem State, respectively. The Cavaliers' downward spiral continued in 2013 as the team, now led at quarterback by redshirt sophomore David Watford, finished last in the ACC with a record of 2–10, losing their last nine games of the season. The following year saw marginal improvement under quarterbacks Greyson Lambert and Matt Johns, but went 5–7, including an eleventh-straight loss to Virginia Tech. Athletic director Craig Littlepage chose prior to the end of the season to retain London for 2015, but fans continued to express dissatisfaction with the play-calling of London and his staff, and some calling for London's ouster. After a third 4–8 season in 2015, London resigned as head coach. Perhaps the most damning feature of London's tenure is that he fared 0–12 in Virginia's rivalry games against North Carolina and Virginia Tech.

=== Bronco Mendenhall era (2016–2021) ===
BYU head coach Bronco Mendenhall was named head coach of the Cavaliers on December 4, 2015. Mendenhall soon led Virginia to bowl games in his second and third years, including a surprising 28–0 rout of South Carolina in the 2018 Belk Bowl. These were the first consecutive bowl appearances for the program since 2002–2005. Mendenhall also lead the Cavaliers to victory over their arch-rival Hokies in 2019 to break the 15-year losing streak in a game with the most on the line for both teams in nearly a decade, an exciting de facto Coastal Championship Game that sent UVA to the 2019 ACC Championship Game and 2019 Orange Bowl. Mendenhall became the first coach to bring the Commonwealth Cup and Jefferson-Eppes Trophy to Charlottesville at the same time, on the heels of winning his third consecutive South's Oldest Rivalry game. His 2020 and 2021 campaigns did not fare quite as well, with records of 5–5 and 6–6, including 1–3 against Virginia's rivals North Carolina and Virginia Tech. On December 2, 2021, Mendenhall announced that he would step down as head coach following the Cavaliers' 2021 bowl game. The decision was entirely Mendenhall's choice; he was not forced out and was not leaving for another job. 247Sports reported the Virginia opening would project as one of the "more attractive jobs" on the market, considering "strong in-state recruiting grounds" and it being situated in a "wide-open Power Five conference."

=== Tony Elliott era (2022–present) ===
Tony Elliott was named the head coach of the Cavaliers on December 10, 2021. Elliott previously served as the assistant head coach, offensive coordinator and tight ends coach at Clemson University. Elliott signed a six-year contract with UVA worth $25.93 million excluding incentives.

On November 13, 2022, three members of the team were shot and killed in a shooting. The suspected gunman was a former high school running back who was a member of the Virginia team for one season in 2018, but due to a lingering injury was unable to practice with the team.

During the 2025 season, Elliot guided the Cavaliers to their best season in program history, achieving a program record of 11 wins, including wins over No. 8 Florida State and in-state rival Virginia Tech, their third win in 20 years of the rivalry. Finishing the season 10–2, advancing to the ACC Championship, and with a chance to be invited to the 2025–26 College Football Playoff, the Cavaliers lost 27–20 in overtime to Duke. The Cavaliers ended the season winning the 2025 Gator Bowl over Missouri, 13–7.

== Conference affiliations ==
- Independent (1888–1899)
- Eastern Virginia Intercollegiate Athletic Association (1900–1905)
- Independent (1906–1911)
- South Atlantic Intercollegiate Athletic Association (1912–1921)
- Southern Conference (1922–1936)
- Independent (1937–1953)
- Atlantic Coast Conference (1954–present)
  - Coastal Division (2005–2022)

== Championships ==
=== Conference championships ===
The Cavaliers have won numerous conference championships, although the number is up for dispute. In the latter part of the 19th century, conferences were not prominent as much as independent football play was. Retroactively, a list of independent southern football champions has listed Virginia as champion of the South on an independent level 12 times from 1889 to 1908.

Year	Conference	Coach	Overall Record	Conference Record
1914†	SAIAA	Joseph M. Wood	8–1	3–0
1915†	SAIAA	Harry Varner	8–1	2–0
1989†	Atlantic Coast Conference	George Welsh	10–3	6–1
1995†	Atlantic Coast Conference	George Welsh	9–4	7–1

† Co-championship.

=== Division championships ===
Year	Division Championship	Coach	Opponent	Result
2019	ACC Coastal	Bronco Mendenhall	Clemson	L 17–62

== Head coaches ==
Virginia has had 42 head coaches since organized football began in 1888. Tony Elliot has been the current head coach since 2022.

Tenure	Coach	Years	Record	Pct.
1888–1891	Unknown	4	13–6–2	.667
1892	William C. Spicer	1	3–2–1	.583
1893–1894	Johnny Poe	2	16–5	.762
1895	Harry Arista Mackey	1	9–2	.818
1896–1897	Martin V. Bergen	2	13–4–3	.725
1898	Joseph Massie	1	6–5	.545
1899–1900	Archie Hoxton	2	11–5–3	.658
1901	Westley Abbott	1	8–2	.800
1902	John de Saulles	1	8–1–1	.850
1903	Gresham Poe	1	7–2–1	.750
1904	George Sanford	1	6–3	.667
1905–1906	William C. "King" Cole	2	12–6–2	.650
1907	Hammond Johnson	1	6–3–1	.650
1908	Merritt Cooke Jr.	1	7–0–1	.938
1909	John Neff	1	7–1	.875
1910	Charles B. Crawford	1	6–2	.750
1911	Kemper Yancey	1	8–2	.800
1912	John S. Elliott	1	6–3	.667
1913, 1920–1921	W. Rice Warren	3	17–7–2	.692
1914	Joseph M. Wood	1	8–1	.889
1915	Harry Varner	1	8–1	.889
1916	Peyton Evans	1	4–5	.444
1917–1918	No Varsity Schedule	2		
1919	Harris Coleman	1	2–5–2	.333
1922	Thomas J. Campbell	1	4–4–1	.500
1923–1928	Greasy Neale	6	28–22–5	.555
1929–1930	Earl Abell	2	8–9–2	.474
1931–1933	Fred Dawson	3	8–17–4	.345
1934–1936	Gus Tebell	3	6–18–4	.286
1937–1945	Frank Murray	9	41–34–5	.544
1946–1952	Art Guepe	7	47–17–2	.727
1953–1955	Ned McDonald	3	5–23	.179
1956–1957	Ben Martin	2	7–12–1	.375
1958–1960	Dick Voris	3	1–29	.033
1961–1964	Bill Elias	4	16–23–1	.413
1965–1970	George Blackburn	6	29–32	.475
1971–1973	Don Lawrence	3	11–22	.333
1974–1975	Sonny Randle	2	5–17	.227
1976–1981	Dick Bestwick	6	16–49–1	.250
1982–2000	George Welsh	19	134–86–3	.608
2001–2009	Al Groh	9	59–53	.527
2010–2015	Mike London	6	27–46	.370
2016–2021	Bronco Mendenhall	6	36–38	.486
2022–present	Tony Elliott	3	21–26	.447

== Stadiums ==
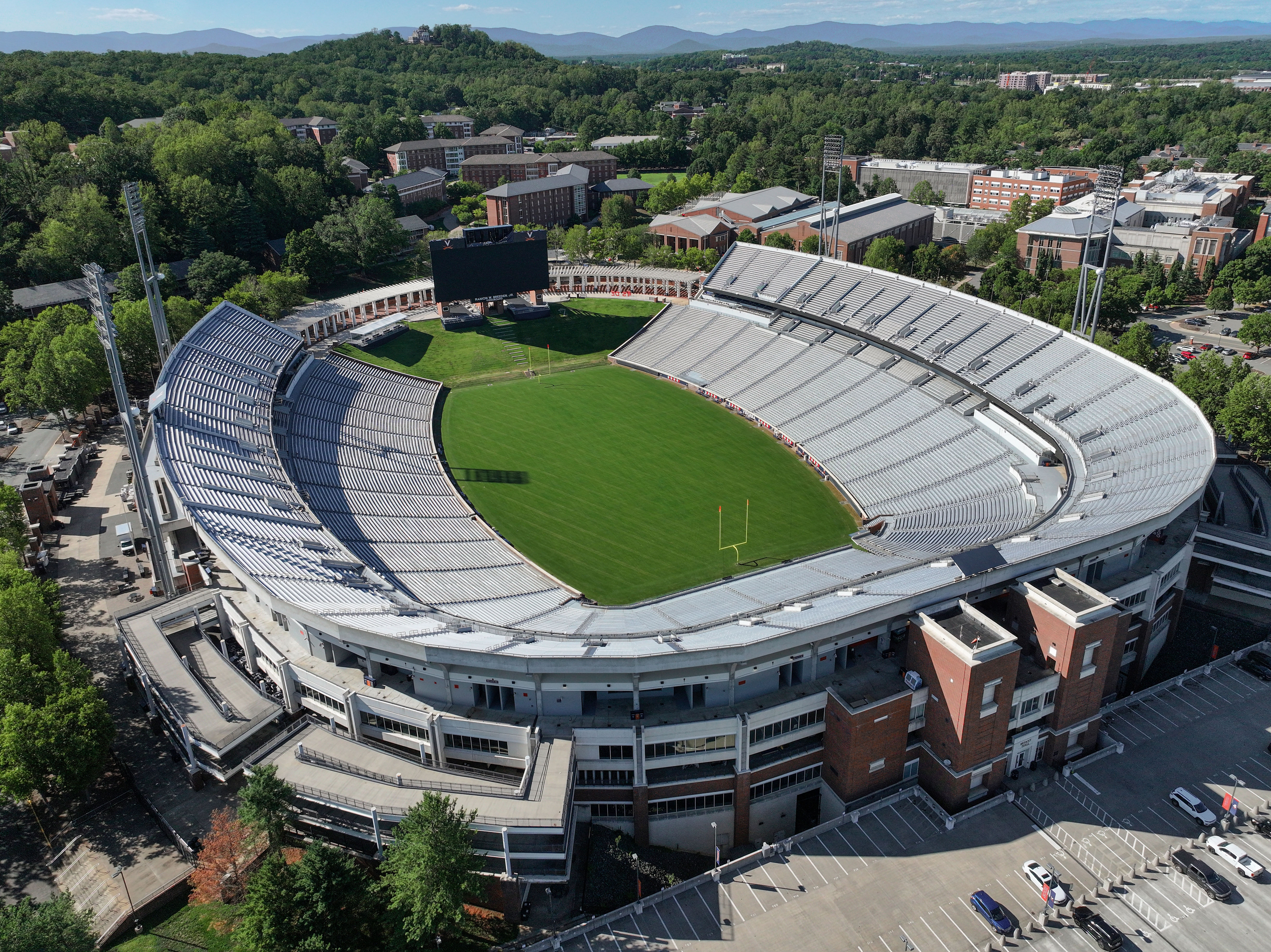
Aerial view of Scott Stadium

- 1888–1912 Madison Hall Field
- 1913–1930 Lambeth Field
- 1931–present Scott Stadium

== Bowl games ==
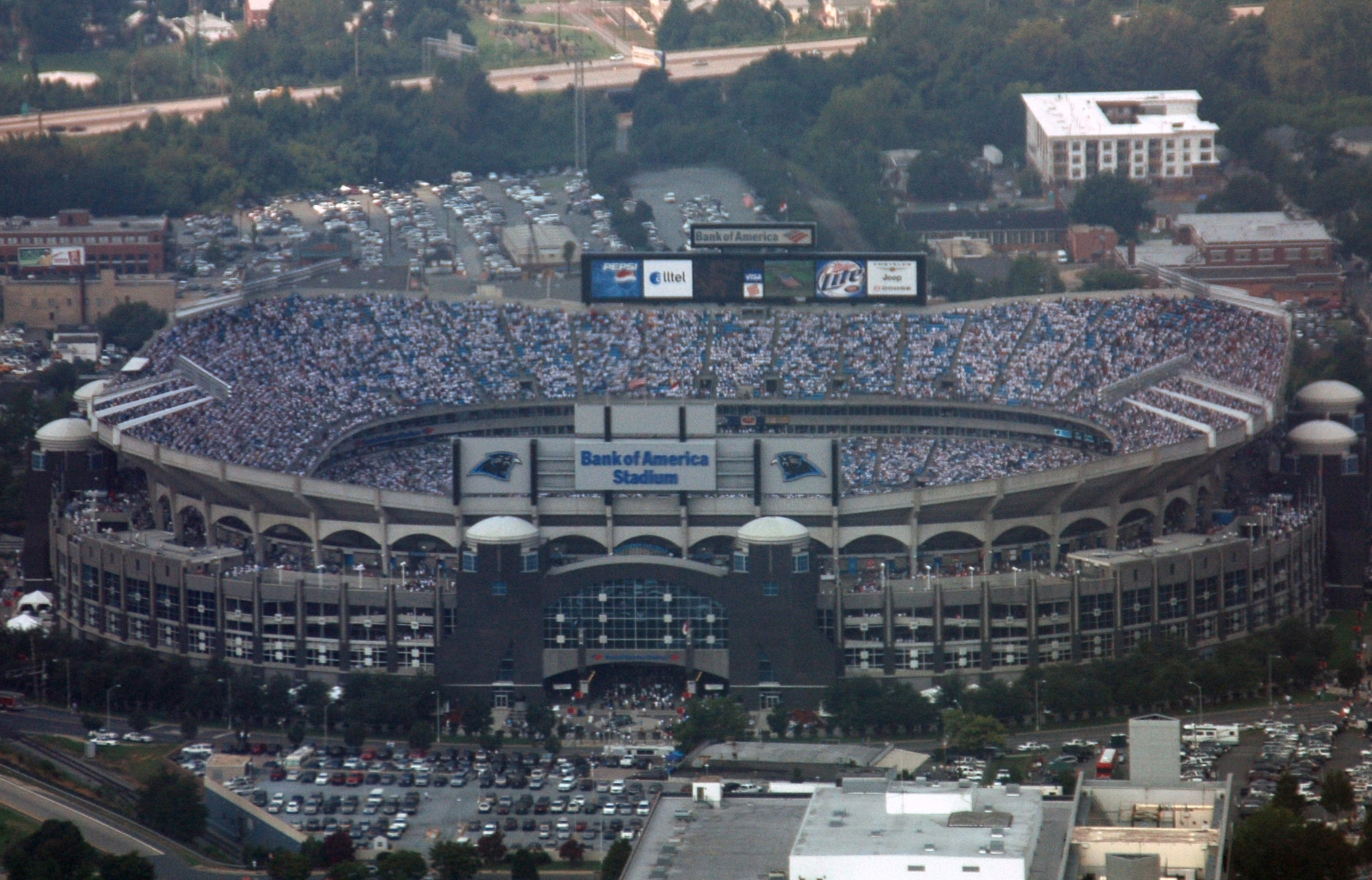
Virginia holds a 3–0 record at, and holds the largest margin of victory in, the Charlotte bowl game now known as the Duke's Mayo Bowl, annually played at Bank of America Stadium.

Virginia has been invited to the Gator, Peach, Citrus, Sugar, and Orange Bowls, among others. The Cavaliers' most recent bowl appearance was in the 2025 Gator Bowl against the Missouri Tigers. The program's all-time bowl record is 9–13 through the 2025 season. The team has appeared in four consecutive bowl games twice in its history, in 1993–1996 and 2002–2005. Virginia is the winningest team in Duke's Mayo Bowl history with a 3–0 record after its victories in 2002, 2003, and 2018. Virginia also holds the record for largest margin of victory in that bowl after its 28–0 shutout victory over South Carolina at Bank of America Stadium in 2018.

Season	Coach	Bowl	Opponent	Result
1984	George Welsh	Peach Bowl	Purdue	W 27–24
1987	George Welsh	All-American Bowl	BYU	W 22–16
1989	George Welsh	Florida Citrus Bowl	Illinois	L 21–31
1990	George Welsh	Sugar Bowl	Tennessee	L 22–23
1991	George Welsh	Gator Bowl	Oklahoma	L 14–48
1993	George Welsh	Carquest Bowl	Boston College	L 14–48
1994	George Welsh	Independence Bowl	TCU	W 20–10
1995	George Welsh	Peach Bowl	Georgia	W 34–27
1996	George Welsh	Carquest Bowl	Miami	L 21–31
1998	George Welsh	Peach Bowl	Georgia	L 33–35
1999	George Welsh	MicronPC Bowl	Illinois	L 21–63
2000	George Welsh	Oahu Bowl	Georgia	L 14–37
2002	Al Groh	Continental Tire Bowl	West Virginia	W 48–22
2003	Al Groh	Continental Tire Bowl	Pittsburgh	W 23–16
2004	Al Groh	MPC Computers Bowl	Fresno State	L 34–37
2005	Al Groh	Music City Bowl	Minnesota	W 34–31
2007	Al Groh	Gator Bowl	Texas Tech	L 28–31
2011	Mike London	Chick-fil-A Bowl	Auburn	L 24–43
2017	Bronco Mendenhall	Military Bowl	Navy	L 7–49
2018	Bronco Mendenhall	Belk Bowl	South Carolina	W 28–0
2019	Bronco Mendenhall	Orange Bowl	Florida	L 28–36
2025	Tony Elliott	Gator Bowl	Missouri	W 13–7

== Final poll rankings ==
Virginia rankings in final AP and Coaches polls.

Year	Record	Final AP Poll Rank	Final Coaches Poll Rank
1951	8–1	13	—
1984	8–2–2	20	17
1989	10–3	18	15
1990	8–4	23	15
1994	9–3	15	13
1995	9–4	16	17
1998	9–3	18	18
2002	9–5	22	25
2004	8–4	23	23
2019	9–5	—	25
2025	11–3	16	16

== Rivalries ==
=== Duke ===
The two bordering-state universities in the southern United States have spent most of their athletic histories as members of the same conference; first the Southern Conference from 1930 to 1936 before helping found the Atlantic Coast Conference (ACC) in 1954 where they remain as members to the present day. The series has been played 76 times dating back to the first meeting in 1890, and the teams met on the football field every year uninterrupted from 1963 to 2023. When the ACC split into non-geographical divisions in 2005, both Duke and Virginia were placed in the "Coastal" division which guaranteed an annual football meeting between the schools. Beginning with the 2023 season, however, the conference eliminated divisions in favor of a scheduling arrangement that calls for three annual conference opponents for each member while rotating the other five conference opponents. Duke and Virginia were not designated as one of each other's three annual conference football opponents, and consequently the rivalry will be played intermittently for the foreseeable future.

The rivalry reached its peak in the late 1980's during the respective head coaching tenures of Steve Spurrier at Duke (1987 to 1989) and George Welsh at Virginia (1982 to 2000). The beef between Spurrier and Welsh dated back to 1982 when Welsh accused Spurrier, then the offensive coordinator of the Blue Devils, of running up the score in Duke's 51–17 win. Then in 1989, the Cavaliers defeated the Blue Devils 49–28, but at the end of the regular season the teams found themselves in a three-way tie with Clemson for the ACC championship. To Welsh's annoyance, Spurrier publicly claimed despite losing to the Cavaliers that his Blue Devils deserved the league title by virtue of their victory over Clemson, the defending league champion, a week after the Virginia game. Spurrier also accused Welsh of unethical recruiting tactics, a charge Welsh denied. Additionally, the 1993 matchup between the teams, a 35–0 win for Virginia, was notable for a bench-clearing brawl between players on both teams.

=== Florida State ===
The two teams play for the Jefferson–Eppes Trophy. The trophy was created on the suggestion of former FSU President Sandy D'Alemberte, after Virginia became the first ACC program to defeat Florida State on November 2, 1995. To that point, the Seminoles had run up a perfect 29–0 record through their first 3½ years of Atlantic Coast Conference play. Florida State leads 14–4 through the 2019 season. In recent decades the games are sporadic but competitive: since 2005, Virginia is 4–2 against Florida State (as of 2025). Virginia last won the trophy in 2025 and holds it currently.

=== Maryland ===
Virginia and Maryland were ACC "permanent rivals" from 2005–2013 under the two-division system. Many athletes and students on both sides come from the Washington Metropolitan Area. Maryland leads the series 46–32–2, though UVA has held the upper hand, 15–9, since 1991. Maryland has won the last two in 2023 and 2024.

=== North Carolina ===
The teams have played every year since 1919 and began playing in 1895, in what is by far the longest series in the ACC. The name of the rivalry stems from the fact that the two programs were regarded as the best of the South between 1895 and 1910, winning the vast majority of southern championships during that era. The game was played on Thanksgiving Day through 1950, and a sitting President of the United States (Calvin Coolidge) made the multi-hour trip to Charlottesville on Thanksgiving to view the game in 1928. North Carolina leads the series 67–59–4 per Virginia records, though UVA has held the upper hand, 25–16–1, since 1983.

=== Virginia Tech ===
Virginia and Virginia Tech first met in 1895 and have played annually since 1970, with the Commonwealth Cup awarded to the victor since 1996. Virginia last won the Cup in 2025 after a 27–7 victory. Their 2019 win over the Hokies ended a 15-game losing streak in the rivalry in a de facto Coastal Championship Game that sent UVA to the 2019 Orange Bowl, the first New Year's Six bowl for either of the two programs. Virginia Tech leads the series 60–39–5 through the 2025 season.

== Individual honors ==
=== Major awards ===
- Maxwell Award

Bill Dudley—1941

- Campbell/Draddy Trophy

Thomas D. Burns—1993
Micah Kiser—2017

- John Mackey Award

Heath Miller—2004

- Ted Hendricks Award

Chris Long—2007

- Bobby Dodd Coach of the Year Award

George Welsh—1991

- ACC Coach of the Year

Bill Elias—1961
George Blackburn—1968
George Welsh—1983, 1984, 1991, 1995
Al Groh—2002, 2007
Mike London—2011
Tony Elliott—2025

- ACC Player of the Year

Bob Davis—1966
Frank Quayle—1968
Barry Word—1985
Shawn Moore—1989, 1990
Matt Blundin—1991
Tiki Barber—1996
Matt Schaub—2002

- ACC Rookie of the Year

John Ford—1984
Ronde Barber—1994

- ACC Defensive Player of the Year

Anthony Poindexter—1998
Chris Long—2007

=== First Team All Americans ===
- Jim Bakhtiar, FB, 1957
- Will Brice, P, 1995
- Ahmad Brooks, LB, 2004
- Elton Brown, OG, 2004
- Mark Dixon, OG, 1993
- Jim Dombrowski, OT, 1985
- Bill Dudley, HB, 1941
- Percy Ellsworth, DB, 1995
- D'Brickashaw Ferguson, OT, 2005
- Thomas Jones, HB, 1999
- Patrick Kerney, DE, 1998
- Noel LaMontagne, OT/OG, 1999
- Chris Long, DE 2007
- Eugene Mayer, HB 1915
- Heath Miller, TE, 2004
- Herman Moore, WR, 1990
- Shawn Moore, QB, 1990
- Joe Palumbo, MG, 1951
- John Papit, FB, 1949
- Anthony Poindexter, DB, 1997 & 1998
- Ray Roberts, OT, 1991
- Ray Savage, DE/OLB, 1989
- Tom Scott, DE, 1952
- Chris Slade, DE, 1991 & 1992
- John St. Clair, C, 1999

=== First Team All Southerns ===
- H. T. Summersgill, End, 1898
- John Loyd, T, 1898, 1899, & 1900
- James Davis, G, 1898
- William Choice, G, 1899 & 1900
- Harry Gerstle, HB, 1899
- Robert M. Coleman, FB, 1899, 1901
- Alexis Hobson, End, 1900
- Virginius Dabney, HB, 1900
- Christie Benet, T, 1901
- Buck Harris, G, 1901
- Ed Tutwiler, QB, 1901
- Bradley Walker, FB, 1901
- Thomas Bronston, End, 1902
- Henry Johnson, T, 1902 & 1903
- Walter Council, T, 1902, 1903, & 1904
- John Pollard, QB, 1902 & 1903
- Clyde Conner, G, 1903
- Branch Johnson, G, 1904
- Hammond Johnson, HB, 1904 & 1905
- Oscar Randolph, QB, 1906
- Henry Cabell Maddux, Jr, End, 1907
- William Gloth, C, 1907 & 1908
- Sam Honaker, QB, 1907 & 1908
- Carlton Elliott, End, 1908 & 1909
- B. R. Cecil, T, 1909
- Forest Stanton, HB, 1909
- Kemper Yancey, FB, 1909
- Rube Barker, T, 1914
- Harris Coleman, G, 1914
- Eugene Mayer, HB, 1914 & 1915
- Charles R. Fenwick, T, 1922
- G. B. Arnold, HB, 1922
- Charles Mackall, G, 1926

=== Retired numbers ===
The Cavaliers have retired 6 numbers to date.

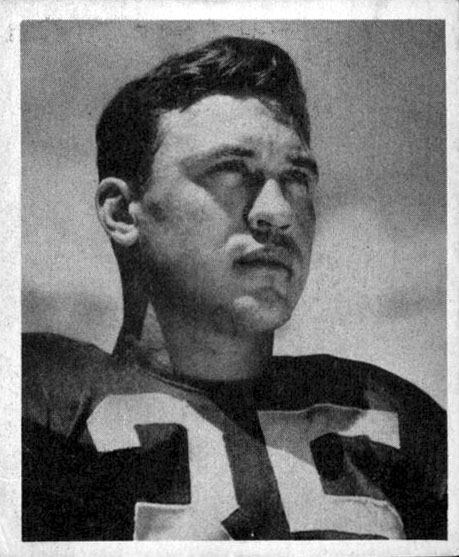
Bill Dudley's #35, one of the numbers retired by Virginia

Virginia Cavaliers retired numbers
No.	Player	Pos.	Tenure
12	Shawn Moore	QB	1988–1990
24	Frank Quayle	RB	1966–1968
35	Bill Dudley	HB	1940–1942
48	Joe Palumbo	G	1949–1951
73	Jim Dombrowski	OT	1982–1985
97	Gene Edmonds ^{1}	HB	1948–1949

Notes:

- ^{1} Posthumous honour.

=== Retired jerseys ===
The University of Virginia's athletic department has issued the following statement distinguishing retired jerseys from retired numbers: "Jersey retirement honors Virginia players who have significantly impacted the program. Individuals recognized in this way will have their jerseys retired, but their number will remain active."

Virginia Cavaliers retired jerseys
No.	Player	Pos.	Tenure
3	Anthony Poindexter	DB	1995–1998
6	Thomas Jones	RB	1996–1999
7	Matt Schaub	QB	1999–2003
10	Will Brice	P	1993–1996
12	Bob Davis	QB	1963–1966
19	Ronde Barber	CB	1993–1996
21	Tiki Barber	RB	1993–1996
34	Jim Bakhtiar	FB/K	1955–1957
42	Terry Kirby	RB	1989–1992
50	John St. Clair	OT	1996–1999
56	Ray Savage	LB	1986–1989
58	Patrick Kerney	DE	1997–1999
61	Elton Brown	G	2001–2004
66	Mark Dixon	G	1990–1993
66	D'Brickashaw Ferguson	OT	2002–2005
72	Ray Roberts	OT	1988–1991
77	Noel LaMontagne	G	1995–1999
82	Tom Scott	E	1950–1952
85	Chris Slade	DE	1989–1992
87	Herman Moore	WR	1987–1990
87	John Papit	HB	1947–1950
89	Heath Miller	TE	2001–2004
91	Chris Long	DE	2004–2007
98	Patrick Kerney	DE	1997–1999

=== College Football Hall of Famers ===
- Bill Dudley, HB, inducted in 1956
- Earle "Greasy" Neale, head coach, inducted in 1967
- Tom Scott, DE, inducted in 1979
- Frank Murray, head coach, inducted in 1983
- Joe Palumbo, MG, inducted in 1999
- George Welsh, head coach, inducted in 2004
- Jim Dombrowski, OG, inducted in 2008
- Anthony Poindexter, S, inducted in 2020

=== NFL Hall of Famers ===
- Bill Dudley, HB, inducted December 6, 1966
- Earle "Greasy" Neale, head coach, inducted September 13, 1969
- Henry Jordan, T, inducted July 29, 1995
- Ronde Barber, CB, inducted August 5, 2023

== Memorable games ==
=== 1915: Virginia 10 – Yale 0 ===
Betting was heavy on Yale for a 1915 game that ranked as the biggest all-time win at that stage of Virginia's history. No Southern team had ever defeated the Ivy League power until Virginia—led by quarterback Norborne Berkeley and Buck Mayer—won 10–0 in New Haven.

=== 1990: #14 Virginia 20 – #9 Clemson 7 ===
Prior to the arrival of George Welsh, Clemson dominated the series against Virginia. The Tigers had not lost a single game to the Cavaliers and most games were blowouts. Former Clemson coach Frank Howard had referred to the Cavaliers as "White Meat" back in the 1960s and they hadn't lost to Virginia since. Despite Welsh's success, the Tigers' record against the Cavaliers stood at 29–0 after Clemson defeated the 1989 Virginia team that captured the ACC co-championship. Behind a high-powered offense with Shawn Moore, Herman Moore, and Terry Kirby and a strong defensive effort led by Chris Slade, the Cavaliers finally defeated Clemson, which was ranked in the top ten at the time, in the second game of the 1990 season. The win propelled the Cavaliers' rise in the polls, which culminated in a number-one ranking in late October.

=== 1995: #24 Virginia 33 – #2 Florida State 28 ===
UVa managed to win its share of close games as the 1995 season unfolded, including a 33–28 upset victory over second-ranked and previously unbeaten Florida State. Playing on national television in the first-ever Thursday night game in Charlottesville, Virginia stopped the Seminoles at the goal line on the game's final play (in the early morning hours of Friday, November 3, 1995) to preserve the win. With the victory, the Cavaliers ended FSU's four-year, 29-game winning streak against ACC teams since joining the conference in 1992. Florida State became the highest-ranked team to ever fall to the Cavaliers. Virginia and Florida State were later crowned co-ACC champions after finishing the season with identical 7–1 conference records.

=== 1996: #24 Virginia 20 – #6 North Carolina 17 ===
During a generally disappointing 1996 season, the Cavaliers upset the top ten–ranked Tar Heels at Scott Stadium. In the fourth quarter, North Carolina led Virginia 17–3 and, having advanced within the Cavaliers' five-yard line, were about to put the game away. However, Virginia cornerback Antwan Harris intercepted a Tar Heel pass in the end zone and returned it 95 yards for a touchdown. Quarterback Tim Sherman then led the Cavaliers to another ten points, capped by Rafael Garcia's late game field goal, and the defense shut down the demoralized Tar Heels for a stunning 20–17 comeback victory. The defeat cost North Carolina a bid to the Bowl Alliance; coach Mack Brown left UNC for Texas after another highly ranked Tar Heel team in 1997 also failed to receive a Bowl Alliance bid.

=== 1998: #16 Virginia 36 – #20 Virginia Tech 32 ===
Virginia ended the 1998 regular season with a 36–32 victory at Virginia Tech in the greatest comeback in school history. Down 29–7 at the half, the Cavaliers outscored the Hokies 29–3 in the final two quarters. UVA capped its historic rally with a game-winning 47-yard touchdown pass from Aaron Brooks to wide receiver Ahmad Hawkins with 2:01 left to play. As of 2025, this remains UVA's most recent win in Blacksburg.

=== 2011: Virginia 14 – #25 Florida State 13 ===
Before 2011, Virginia had never won a game against Florida State in Tallahassee. The Cavaliers' record against the Seminoles stood at 2–14 overall and 0–8 in Doak Campbell Stadium. Virginia running back Kevin Parks ran for a touchdown with 1:16 remaining in the game, giving Virginia the lead. Florida State kicker Dustin Hopkins then missed a 42-yard field goal as time ran out, giving the Cavaliers their first win in Tallahassee in school history. This UVA football team was also the first UVA football team to win at FSU and at Miami in the same season.

=== 2019: Virginia 39 – #24 Virginia Tech 30 ===
Virginia lost 15 consecutive games to Virginia Tech from 2004 through 2018. Entering the 2019 contest, the Cavaliers and Hokies had identical records of 5–2 in ACC play and 8–3 overall, making the game a de facto ACC Coastal Division championship. Virginia quarterback Bryce Perkins had a total of 475 yards and three touchdowns, while kicker Brian Delaney kicked two late field goals to give Virginia a tenuous 33–30 lead. With just over a minute left, Virginia sacked the Hokies' Hendon Hooker three consecutive times. On the third sack, Hooker fumbled the ball, which was recovered by defensive lineman Eli Hanback in the VT end zone for a touchdown to seal the win, end the losing streak, and send Virginia to its first ever ACC championship game. Virginia went on to make its first Orange Bowl and also its first New Year's Six bowl game appearance.

=== 2025: Virginia 46 – #8 Florida State 38 ===
The Seminoles came to Charlottesville riding high from a 31–17 upset over No. 8 Alabama in Week 1 and were ranked eighth in the nation themselves after three games. In front of 50,107 fans, the Hoos battled Florida State to a second overtime, where a rushing touchdown by star quarterback Chandler Morris and a game-sealing interception by defensive back Ja'son Prevard on fourth & 12 sealed the game for the Cavaliers, resulting in one of the quickest field stormings in recent memory. The win improved Virginia's record to 4–1, as well as 2–0 in ACC play. Virginia went on to make and win its first bowl game under Head Coach Tony Elliott, finishing the season with the most wins in UVA history (11).

== Current NFL players ==
As of January 1, 2026.

- Joey Blount—S, Arizona Cardinals
- Elliott Brown-LB, Arizona Cardinals
- Brent Urban-DE, Baltimore Ravens
- Olamide Zaccheaus-WR, Chicago Bears
- Dontayvion Wicks-WR, Green Bay Packers
- Juan Thornhill-S, Jacksonville Jaguars
- Charles Snowden-DE, Las Vegas Raiders
- Malik Washington-WR, Miami Dolphins
- Morgan Moses-OT, New England Patriots
- Jonas Sanker-S, New Orleans Saints
- Jelani Woods-TE, New York Jets
- Bryce Hall-CB-Tampa Bay Buccaneers

== Notable former players ==
- Tiki Barber—retired NFL running back, New York Giants
- Ronde Barber—retired NFL defensive back, Tampa Bay Buccaneers
- Aaron Brooks—retired NFL quarterback, New Orleans Saints, and Oakland Raiders
- Tyrone Davis—retired NFL wide receiver/tight end, New York Jets, and Green Bay Packers
- James Farrior— retired NFL linebacker, New York Jets and Pittsburgh Steelers
- Jim Grobe—head coach, Wake Forest Demon Deacons football
- Thomas Jones—retired NFL running back, Arizona Cardinals, Tampa Bay Buccaneers, Chicago Bears, New York Jets, and Kansas City Chiefs
- Patrick Kerney—retired NFL defensive end, Atlanta Falcons, and Seattle Seahawks
- Chris Long—retired NFL defensive end, St. Louis Rams, New England Patriots, and Philadelphia Eagles; Walter Payton Man of the Year Award
- Don Majkowski—retired NFL quarterback
- Chase Minnifield—retired NFL cornerback, Washington Redskins
- Herman Moore—retired NFL wide receiver, Detroit Lions and New York Giants
- Wali Rainer—retired NFL linebacker
- Terrence Wilkins—retired NFL and CFL wide receiver, Indianapolis Colts
- Derek Dooley—former head coach, University of Tennessee Volunteers football
- Jon Tenuta—former defensive coordinator, University of Virginia Cavaliers football
- Heath Miller—retired NFL tight end, Pittsburgh Steelers
- D'Brickashaw Ferguson—retired NFL left tackle, New York Jets

== Future opponents ==
Year	Non-conference opponents				ACC opponents								
2026	Norfolk State	vs West Virginia (Charlotte, NC)	Delaware		NC State	Cal	Duke	UNC	Syracuse	at Florida State	at SMU	at Virginia Tech	at Wake Forest
2027	Arkansas State	William & Mary	Notre Dame		NC State	Pitt	SMU	Virginia Tech	Louisville	at Boston College	at Georgia Tech	at Miami	at UNC
2028	at Vanderbilt	Richmond	James Madison		Clemson	Georgia Tech	Miami	UNC	at Duke	at Stanford	at Syracuse	at Virginia Tech	TBD
2029	Kansas	Hampton	TBD		Florida State	Syracuse	Virginia Tech	Wake Forest	at Clemson	at Georgia Tech	at NC State	at UNC	TBD
2030	at Kansas	VMI	TBD		Boston College	Miami	UNC	at Stanford	at Cal	at Florida State	at Louisville	at Virginia Tech	TBD
2031	at Washington State	Richmond	Vanderbilt	Notre Dame									
2032	VMI	vs West Virginia (Charlotte, NC)	TBD	TBD									
2033	TBD	TBD	TBD	TBD									
2034	at Notre Dame	TBD	TBD	TBD									
2035	Notre Dame	TBD	TBD	TBD									
