= George Andree =

American football player and coach (1879–1934)

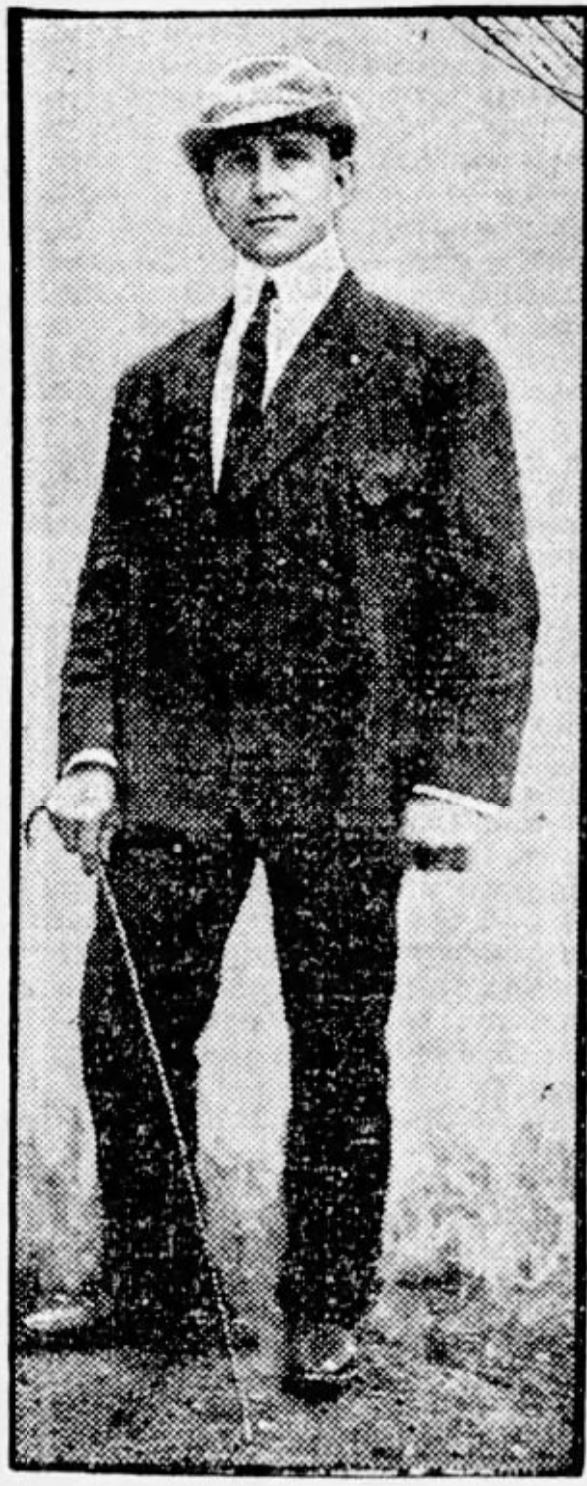
- Andree in 1902

Biographical details
- Born: February 7, 1879; Manistee, Michigan
- Died: October 5, 1934 (aged 55); Scottville, Michigan

Playing career
- 1898–1901: Gallaudet
- Positions: Halfback; Catcher

Coaching career (HC unless noted)
- 1902: Georgia Tech

Head coaching record
- Overall: 0–6–2

George W. Andree (February 7, 1879—October 5, 1934) was an American college football coach for Georgia Tech in 1902.

Andree was born in Manistee, Michigan, but grew up in Scottville, Michigan, where his parents owned the town's first hotel. He was deaf and attended Gallaudet College (now Gallaudet University), a college established for students with hearing and speaking disabilities. He graduated from the school in 1902. He was considered a star athlete for Gallaudet and played four years as halfback on the football team and as catcher for three years on the baseball team. He was captain of the Gallaudet baseball team in both 1900 and 1901. The 1901 football team had Gilbert O. Erickson and Andree in the backfield.

After graduation, Andree became coach of the 1902 Georgia Tech football team. He was known as an expert lipreader and taught the players how to use non-verbal signals to confuse the opposing teams. However, the 1902 season was not successful as Georgia Tech had no wins and just two ties out of eight contests. It was Andree's only year coaching the team.

In 1908, following his coaching career, Andree earned a Doctor of Dental Surgery (DDS) degree from the University of Michigan School of Dentistry and later practiced in Tishomingo, Oklahoma. He became president of the Oklahoma Dentist Association and a legislative committee member of the National Dentists' Association shortly before his death. He died on October 5, 1934, in Scottville, Michigan after a prolonged illness.

== Head coaching record ==
Year	Team	Overall	Conference	Standing	Bowl/playoffs
Georgia Tech (Southern Intercollegiate Athletic Association) (1902)
1902	Georgia Tech	0–6–2	0–4–2	18th	
Georgia Tech:		0–6–2	0–4–2		
Total:		0–6–2			
