= Buck Harris =

American football player and physician

Profile
- Position: Guard

Personal information
- Born: November 16, 1876; Seguin, Texas, U.S.
- Died: December 11, 1965 (aged 89); Birmingham, Alabama, U.S.
- Listed weight: 164 lb (74 kg)

Career information
- College: Virginia (1900–1901)

Awards and highlights
- Southern championship (1900, 1901); All-Southern (1901)

Arthur Buckner "Buck" Harris (November 16, 1876 – December 11, 1965) was a college football player and physician. He was once an eye, ear, nose and throat specialist in Birmingham, Alabama.

== Early life ==
Harris born on November 16, 1876, in Seguin, Texas, to the Rev. Buckner Harris. He grew up in San Antonio, Texas.

== University of Virginia ==
Harris was a prominent guard for the Virginia Cavaliers of the University of Virginia. At Virginia he was a member of the Delta Tau Delta fraternity.

=== 1900 ===
Harris played for the 1900 team which had a claim to a Southern championship and defeated Sewanee to give the school its first loss since 1897.

=== 1901 ===
He was selected All-Southern in 1901.

== Personal life ==
He married Miss Caroline B. Lyons on December 23, 1902. At the time of his marriage he was head surgeon of the Cannelton coal mines in West Virginia.

He died in Birmingham on December 11, 1965, and was buried at Elmwood Cemetery.
