= Star of the West =

American Civil War steamship

Coordinates: 33.527401°N 90.233874°W

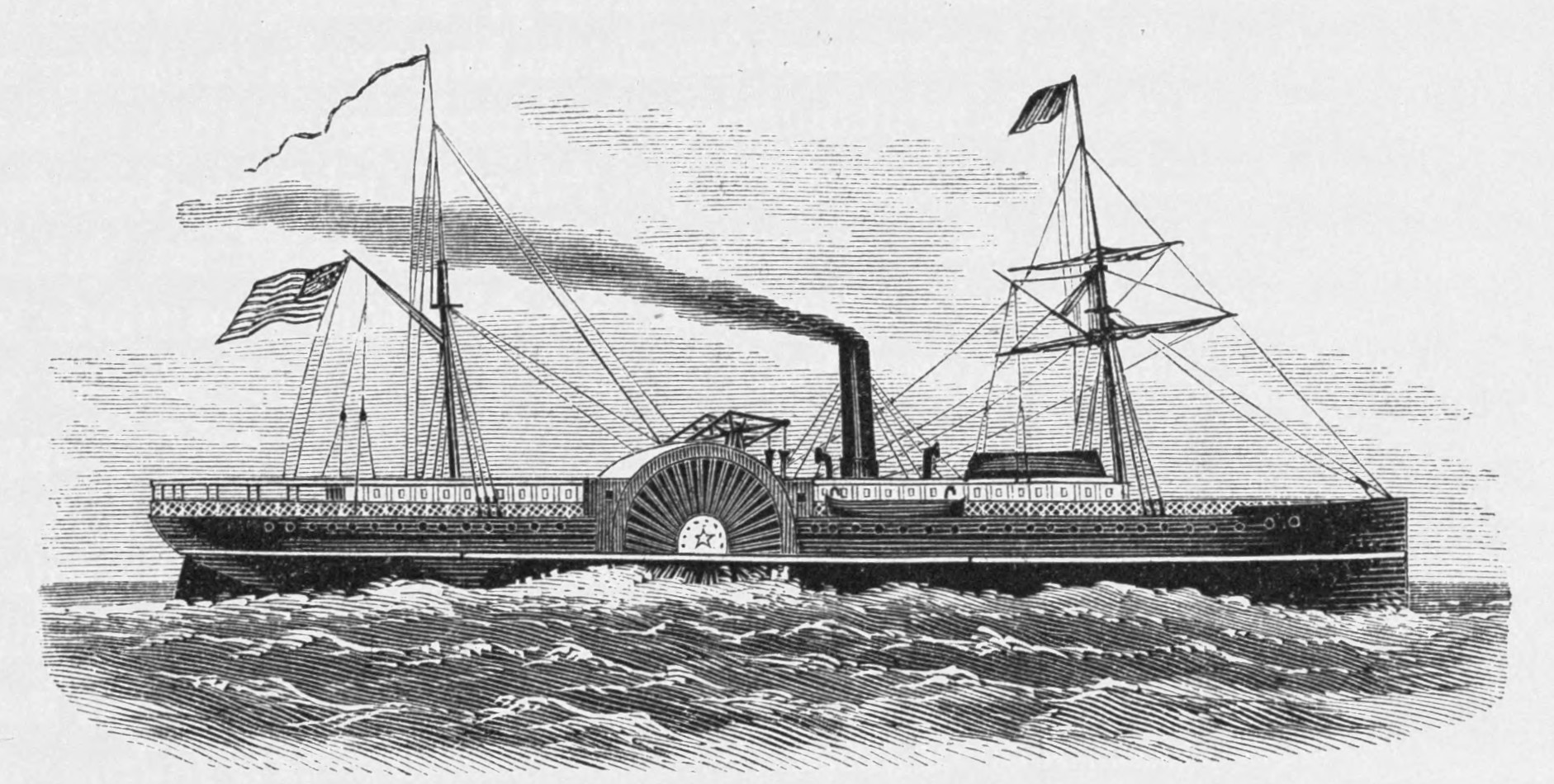
- Contemporaneous wood engraving of Star of the West

History
- Owner: Cornelius Vanderbilt (1852–1853); Charles Morgan (1853–1856); U.S. Mail Steamship Company (1856–)
- Operator: U.S. Department of War (1861–)
- Builder: Jeremiah Simonson
- Launched: 17 June 1852
- Fate: Sunk

General characteristics
- Type: Steamship
- Tonnage: 1,172 tons
- Length: 228.3 ft (69.6 m)
- Beam: 32.7 ft (10.0 m)
- Propulsion: Paddlewheels

Star of the West was an American merchant steamship that was launched in 1852 and scuttled by Confederate forces in 1863. In January 1861, the ship was hired by the government of the United States to transport military supplies and reinforcements to the U.S. military garrison of Fort Sumter. A battery on Morris Island, South Carolina handled by cadets from the South Carolina Military Academy (now The Citadel) fired upon the ship, considered by some scholars to have been effectively the first shots fired in the American Civil War.

The ship was later captured by Confederate forces, then used for several purposes including as a hospital ship and a blockade runner, and finally scuttled in defense of Vicksburg in 1863.

== Prewar service ==
Star of the West was a 1,172-ton steamship built by Jeremiah Simonson, of New York City for Cornelius Vanderbilt, and launched on June 17, 1852. Its length was 228.3 feet (69.6 m) and its beam 32.7 feet (10.0 m), with wooden hullside paddle wheels and two masts. She started service between New York and San Juan de Nicaragua on September 20, 1852, and continued the service for Charles Morgan from July 1853 to March 1856. In June 1857, she started the New York-to-Aspinwall service for the U.S. Mail Steamship Company until September 1859, when it went onto the New York, Havana, New Orleans service. In January 1861, she was chartered to the War Department.

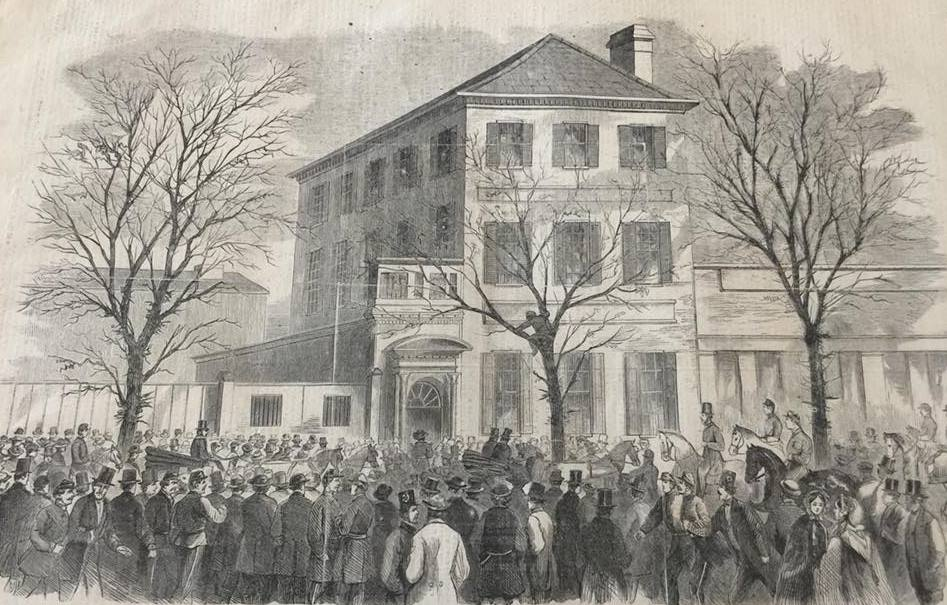
Word of the Star of the West incident was received by Gov. Pickens at his temporary executive headquarters at 107 (now 155) Meeting Street.

== American Civil War ==
On January 9, 1861, weeks after South Carolina declared that it had seceded from the United States, but before other states had done so to form the Confederacy, Star of the West arrived at Charleston Harbor to resupply Major Robert Anderson's garrison at Fort Sumter. The ship was fired upon by cadets from the Citadel Academy and was hit three times by what were effectively the first shots of the American Civil War. Although Star of the West suffered no major damage, her captain, John McGowan, considered it to be too dangerous to continue and turned about to leave the harbor. The mission was abandoned, and Star of the West headed for her home port of New York Harbor.

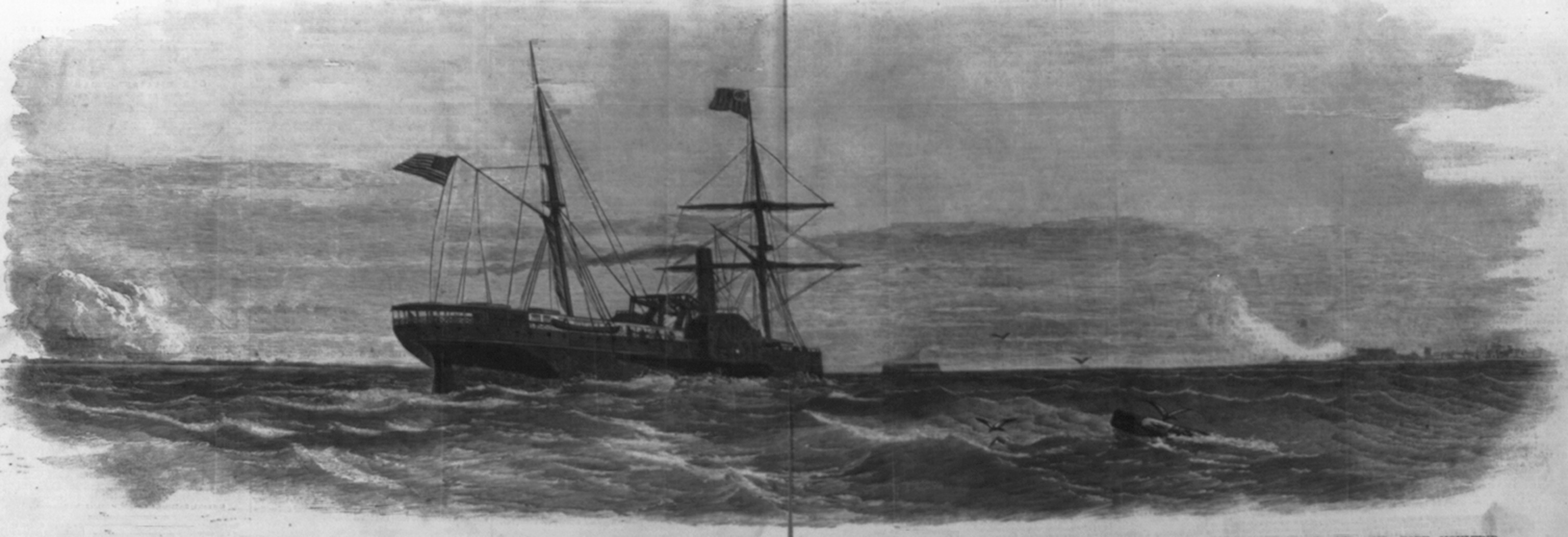
Star of the West approaching Fort Sumter (center right), under fire from batteries on Morris Island (far left) and Fort Moultrie (far right)

The ship was then hired out of New York City as a troop transport for $1,000 a day under its master, Elisha Howes. Star of the West sailed for Texas to pick up seven companies of Union Army troops, assembled at Indianola. On April 18, 1861, while anchored off Pass Caballo bar leading into Matagorda Bay, the ship was captured by Colonel Earl Van Dorn and members of two Galveston militia units, the Wigfall Guards and the Island City Rifles. Two days later, the ship was taken to New Orleans, where Louisiana Governor Thomas Overton Moore changed its name to CSS St. Philip. The old name persisted, however, and Star of the West served as a naval station and hospital ship until Admiral David Farragut captured New Orleans.

Still under Confederate control, Star of the West escaped recapture when she was sent to transport gold, silver, and paper currency worth millions of dollars. After delivering that cargo to Vicksburg, she continued to Yazoo City, Mississippi. When federal Lieutenant Commander Watson Smith tried to lead two ironclads and five smaller vessels through the Yazoo Pass into the Tallahatchie River to attack Vicksburg from the rear, Confederate defenders hurriedly constructed Fort Pemberton, and Major General William W. Loring had Star of the West sunk broadside in the Tallahatchie near Greenwood to block the passage of the Union flotilla. In a skirmish on April 12, 1863, the Union forces suffered heavy casualties and were forced to withdraw.

After the war, the owners of Star of the West collected $175,000 in damages from the U.S. government for the loss.

== Legacy ==
The Star of the West Medal is awarded annually to the "best drilled cadet" at The Citadel, The Military College of South Carolina. In June 1893, The Citadel Superintendent, Colonel Asbury Coward, took the corps to Aiken, South Carolina, for their annual encampment and graduation exercises. The excellent military work of the cadets suggested to Dr. Benjamin H. Teague, a Confederate Veteran and a collector of Confederate relics, to present to the Citadel a medal for the winner of the Best Drilled Cadet competition. Among his many curios, Teague had a piece of oak from the Steam Ship Star of the West. He sawed a small piece of this wood into the shape of a star and had it mounted on a gold medal. The recipient would wear the medal for one year and then pass it to the next recipient. The winner's names are inscribed on the "Star of the West" monument on the college grounds. However, the original medal with the wood has been lost to history.

== In popular culture ==
The incident looms large in a novel by John Updike, Memories of the Ford Administration (1992). Although Updike's protagonist is trying (in the early 1990s) to write about the mid-1970s, he spent those years seeking to write a book about President Buchanan, and his mind keeps reverting to the 19th century and, among other incidents, the mission of the sloop to Fort Sumter.

== See also ==
- Charleston, South Carolina in the American Civil War
- George Edward "Tuck" Haynesworth
- William Stewart Simkins
- Yazoo Pass Expedition
