= Gilbert O. Erickson =

American football player and photographer (1878–1951)

- Born: Gilbert Oscar Erickson; February 10, 1878; Fergus Falls, Minnesota
- Died: March 26, 1951 (aged 73); Miami, Florida
- Occupation: Photographer
- Known for: 1st secretary of the National Literary Society of the Deaf
- Football career

Gallaudet Bison
- Position: Halfback
- Class: 1903

Personal information
- Listed height: 6 ft 0 in (1.83 m)
- Listed weight: 162 lb (73 kg)

Career information
- College: Gallaudet (1900–1902)

Awards and highlights
- All-Southern (1901)

Gilbert Oscar Erickson (February 10, 1878 – March 26, 1951) was an American college football player, photographer, and one of the founders of the National Literary Society of the Deaf as well as its first secretary.

== Early life ==
Gilbert Oscar Erickson was born on February 10, 1878, in Fergus Falls, Minnesota.

== College football ==
Erickson was a prominent halfback for the Gallaudet Bison of Gallaudet University. In 1901, Erickson was selected All-Southern; George Andree was also a halfback for Gallaudet. Erickson was captain in 1902.

== National Literary Society of the Deaf ==
The National Literary Society of the Deaf was founded on February 6, 1907, in Washington, D. C. by Erickson and five other men by the names of John B. Hotchkiss, Rev. Herbert C. Merrill, Albert F. Adams, Rev. Arthur D. Bryant, and Roy J. Stewart. Erickson became deaf due to scarlet fever. He was the first secretary of the National Association of the Deaf.

== Photographer ==
He was the cameraman for the Wallace Press for thirteen straight years.
