= Hub McCormick =

American football player and military engineer (1878–1963)

- Hub cropped from 1900 team picture.

Profile
- Position: Tackle/Halfback

Personal information
- Born: August 16, 1878; Fairfield, Rockbridge County, Virginia
- Died: 1963

Career information
- High school: Augusta Military Academy
- College: V. P. I. (1898–1901)

Awards and highlights
- All-Southern (1901)

Herbert Gilmore "Hub" McCormick (August 16, 1878 – 1963) was a college football player and engineer for the military.

== Early life ==
"Hub" was born on August 16, 1878, in Fairfield, Rockbridge County, Virginia, to James Robert McCormick and Ruth Ann Griener. He received his primary school education at Fairfield, and for his high school education he attended Augusta Military Academy, near Staunton, Virginia, from 1896 to 1898.

== College athletics ==
McCormick enrolled at Virginia Polytechnic Institute and as a senior was class president. He was selected All-Southern as a tackle on the Virginia Tech Hokies football team in 1901. One source calls him a "holy terror on defensive work." He also played baseball. McCormick later assisted in the construction of Miles Field.

== Engineering ==
After graduation at V.P.I. he was employed by Norfolk and Western Railway, as a civil engineer on surveys and constructions, until 1908. After some post-graduate work, he worked with the Corps of Engineers, U. S. Army, working to improve the Ohio River and its tributaries until 1917. From 1917 to 1918 he was assigned to the job of setting coast defense artillery on the Atlantic Coast; and from 1919 to 1930 his assignment was construction of locks and dams on the Ohio River.

McCormick retired in 1946.
