= Tom Scott (linebacker) =

American football player (1930–2015)

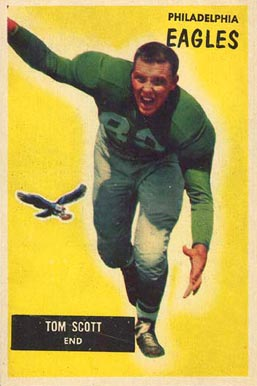
- Scott on a 1955 Bowman football card

No. 82
- Positions: Linebacker, defensive end

Personal information
- Born: September 3, 1930; Baltimore, Maryland, U.S.
- Died: August 31, 2015 (aged 84); Charlottesville, Virginia, U.S.
- Listed height: 6 ft 2 in (1.88 m)
- Listed weight: 210 lb (95 kg)

Career information
- High school: Calvert Hall (Towson, Maryland)
- College: Virginia (1949–1952)
- NFL draft: 1953: 5th round, 60th overall pick

Career history

Playing
- Los Angeles Rams (1953)*; Philadelphia Eagles (1953–1958); New York Giants (1959–1964)
- * Offseason or practice squad member only

Coaching
- New York Giants (1966) Linebackers coach

Awards and highlights
- 2× Pro Bowl (1957, 1958); First-team All-American (1952); Virginia Cavaliers Jersey No. 82 retired

Career NFL statistics
- Interceptions: 8
- Fumble recoveries: 11
- Sacks: 8.5
- Stats at Pro Football Reference
- College Football Hall of Fame

Thomas Coster Scott (September 3, 1930 – August 31, 2015) was an American professional football player who was a linebacker and defensive end in the National Football League (NFL) for the Philadelphia Eagles and New York Giants. He played college football for the Virginia Cavaliers, earning All-American honors as an offensive and defensive end. He was inducted into the College Football Hall of Fame in 1979. Scott was also an elite lacrosse player and was Virginia's first two-sport All-American. He was also on the U.Va. baseball and basketball squads.

Scott died on August 31, 2015.
