= Robert M. Coleman (American football) =

American football player, coach, and physician (1878–1941)

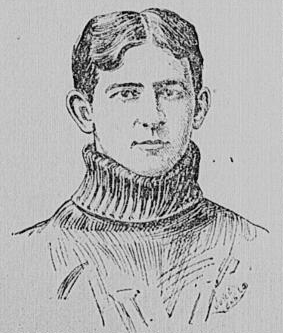

Biographical details
- Born: June 7, 1878; Lexington, Kentucky, U.S.
- Died: September 7, 1941 (aged 63); Lexington, Kentucky, U.S.

Playing career
- 1899–1901: Virginia
- Position: Halfback

Coaching career (HC unless noted)
- 1906: Kentucky University

Accomplishments and honors

Awards
- 2× All-Southern (1899, 1901)

Robert Milligan Coleman (June 7, 1878 – September 7, 1941) was an American college football player, coach, and physician. A native of Lexington, Kentucky, Coleman first attended local Kentucky University, and later coached there.

== Early years ==
Coleman was born to Benjamin Lindsay Coleman and Isabel Milligan.

== University of Virginia ==
Coleman was then a prominent running back for the Virginia Cavaliers football teams of the University of Virginia. He weighed 142 pounds.

=== 1899 ===
Coleman was selected All-Southern in 1899.

=== 1901 ===
He was captain of the 1901 team. Coleman was selected All-Southern.
