= Joe Palumbo (American football) =

American football player (1929–2013)

No. 48
- Position: Guard

Personal information
- Born: August 1, 1929; Beaver, Pennsylvania, U.S.
- Died: December 5, 2013 (aged 84); Charlottesville, Virginia, U.S.
- Listed height: 5 ft 10 in (1.78 m)
- Listed weight: 198 lb (90 kg)

Career information
- High school: Greenbrier Military (Lewisburg, West Virginia)
- College: Virginia (1949–1951)

Awards and highlights
- First-team All-American (1951); Virginia Cavaliers No. 48 retired; Virginia Sports Hall of Fame
- College Football Hall of Fame (Class of 1999)

Joseph C. Palumbo (August 1, 1929 – December 5, 2013) was an American football guard. He played college football for the University of Virginia Cavaliers. He was later elected into the Virginia Sports Hall of Fame in 1976, and the College Football Hall of Fame in 1999.
