= Joseph F. Ware Sr. =

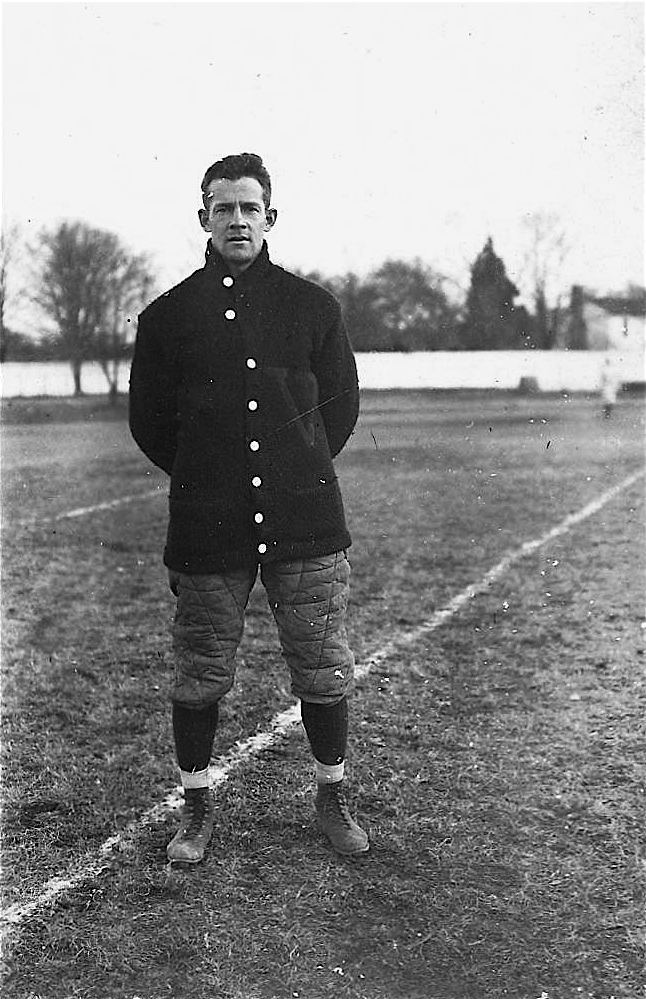
- Born: Joseph Fulton Ware; December 22, 1880; Fort Monroe, Virginia, US
- Died: August 5, 1969 (aged 88); Fort Monmouth, New Jersey, US
- Occupations: Professor of Military Science and Tactics
- Children: Joseph F. Ware Jr.
- Football career

Virginia Tech Hokies
- Position: End
- Class: 1903

Career information
- College: V. P. I. (1900–1902)

Awards and highlights
- All-Southern (1901)

Joseph Fulton "Bald Knob" Ware (December 22, 1880 – August 5, 1969) was professor of Military Science and Tactics at Virginia Polytechnic Institute from 1911 to 1914. During the years of World War I, Ware served in Europe, Alaska, and the Philippines. He served in three divisions, two corps, and two armies. He participated in several influential battles during the war, including the Argonne Offensive and the Battle of St. Mihiel. Ware is buried in Arlington National Cemetery. His son was Joseph F. Ware Jr.

== Early and family life ==
Ware was born on December 22, 1880, in Fort Monroe, Elizabeth City, Virginia to James and Adelaide Ware, a military family. Joseph was the youngest of the couples nine children, with six older sisters and two older brothers. His older sister Adelaide Minerva Ware died in infancy, though the rest of his siblings lived to adulthood. On October 9, 1914, Ware married Susie H. Robinson in Montgomery County. Together they had two children, Joseph F. Ware Jr. (born November 8, 1916) and James Ware (born February 10, 1919). James lived only 20 hours, and Joseph Sr. never met him. In April 1923 Susie divorced Joseph Sr. for "desertion of family" she eventually remarried, and was divorced a second time. Susie died December 5, 1979, at the age of 87. Joseph Sr. went on to marry a woman he met in Germany, who was named Mary. The two of them lived together until his death in 1969, and are both buried in Arlington National Cemetery.

== Education ==
Ware attended Hampton High School in Hampton, Virginia. Ware enrolled at Virginia Polytechnic Institute in 1899 and majored in electrical engineering. While a student at V.P.I., he excelled as a football and baseball player. Ware was an All-Southern end for the football team in 1901. As a senior in 1903, Ware was captain of the baseball team, which posted an 8–4 record. Ware also served as Commandant of the Virginia Tech Corps of Cadets from 1911 to 1914, and was a professor of Military Science and Tactics, and assistant in mathematics.

== Post-graduation ==
Upon graduation in 1903, Ware was appointed a second lieutenant in the United States Army. In 1917, Ware trained at Plattsburg Training Camp, in Plattsburgh, New York. The Plattsburg Camp was a product of the "Plattsburg Movement," in which volunteer military training camps for civilians were highly encouraged and seen as patriotic. The Plattsburg Movement eventually became the "basis of recruiting influence in military policy" at the start of the US' involvement in the war, and almost one half of the officer corps graduated from the Plattsburg Movement. In June 1918, Ware left the camp for Camp Merritt, a pass-through point for soldiers heading to Europe. Four million troops were sent to the Western Front during WWI, and one million of them passed through Camp Merritt. On June 9, 1918, Ware left Camp Merritt for the piers at Hoboken, New Jersey, staying for three days until he left for France on June 12 with the 308th Field Sig Battalion of the American Expeditionary Force (A.E.F.).

== France ==
Ware arrived in France, under the 3rd Corps, in time for the last drive around Chateau Thierry, one of the first actions of the A.E.F. under General John J. Pershing as a part of the Second Battle of the Marne. In mid-September 1918, Ware participated in the Battle of St. Mihel, as a member of the 80th Infantry Division in the First Army reserve. In October 1918, Ware became Chief Signal Officer of the 2nd Army, due to dismissal from the front lines as a result of being ill. Ware was in the push of the 2nd Army on November 9 during the Meuse-Argonne Offensive, during which he was wounded by a bursting shell, breaking his left ear drum; one piece hit his back below his left shoulder blade, left arm, and left hand. As a result of this he was recommended for the United States Signal Corps (U.S.C.) and became division signal officer under General Crondite and Jack Barnes, during which time he traveled to Langres to lecture to staff college. In November, Ware received notice that he would be sent with the new Army of Occupation, or 3rd Army, which was created following the armistice of November 11, 1918, in order to fulfill the duty of the Allies and the United States to control the administration of areas of the left bank of the Rhine. In the winter and spring of 1919, Ware traveled often, frequently in Toul, Mihiel, Coblenz, Luxembourg, and Nogent en Bassigny while based in Le Mans. In early July 1919, Ware received an order directing him to report to the Army of Occupation (The Third Army). On Bastille Day, Ware participated in the parade in Le Mans, however he disapproved of the event, stating that he wanted the money spent on the parade to go to aid for those in devastated areas.

== Germany ==
In early August 1919, Ware settled in the banks of the Rhine in Coblenz, Germany. Ware was Chief Signal Officer of the A Fin G. C.O. [sic. --- try to find out what is or don't include], and chief officer of the Telegraph Kaserne, or German barracks, as a lieutenant colonel. During this time, his responsibilities included the communication system of ATG (?). Om March 1921, Ware was promoted to Signal Corps Major, and received a salary of 485 dollars a month.

== Creation of the SCR-77 Loop Radiotelegraph Set ==
The Signal Corps Radio set was developed in Washington, in order to make a portable apparatus that would provide a more secret and uninterruptible mean of communication with troops in advanced positions. The American Expeditionary Forces in France researched this set as well, and Ware developed the final and most advanced model in June 1918. Ware improved upon the set though a new break-in feature that was similar to that of the common wire telegraph. This new model was considered the most effective means of communication for soldiers in advanced positions and remained in use until the end of the war.

== Later life ==
Ware and his wife divorced in April 1923. On August 5, 1969, Ware died and was buried in Arlington National Cemetery with his second wife Mary. Ware's son Joseph Ware Jr. would go on to attend Virginia Tech as well, and become a successful flight test engineer and member of the Coast Guard, in addition to founding the Joseph F. Ware Jr. Advanced Engineering Laboratory at Virginia Tech.
