= Ormond Simkins =

American football and baseball player (1879–1921)

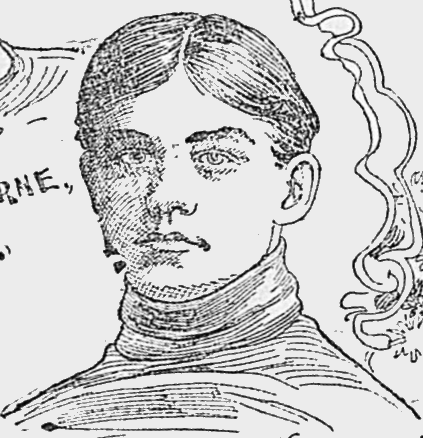
- Simkins depicted c. 1900

Profile
- Positions: Fullback; Catcher (baseball)
- Class: 1902

Personal information
- Born: May 16, 1879; Corsicana, Texas, U.S.
- Died: December 4, 1921 (aged 42); Washington, D.C., U.S.
- Listed height: 5 ft 10 in (1.78 m)
- Listed weight: 163 lb (74 kg)

Career information
- College: Sewanee (1896–1901)

Awards and highlights
- SIAA championship (1898, 1899); All-Southern (1899, 1900, 1901); All-Time Sewanee football team

Ormond Simkins (May 16, 1879 – December 4, 1921) was an American football and baseball player for the Sewanee Tigers of Sewanee: The University of the South. He was the son of William Stewart Simkins, who may have fired the first shot of the American Civil War.

== Early life ==
Ormond was born on May 16, 1879, in Corsicana, Texas, to William Stewart Simkins and Elizabeth Ware.

== Sewanee ==
Ormond entered Sewanee in 1896 as a law student. He was valedictorian of the 1900 class.

=== Baseball ===
On the baseball team he was the catcher and when captain of the team in 1901, moved to shortstop.

=== Football ===
Simkins was an All-Southern fullback and punter of the Sewanee Tigers football team from 1896 to 1901. A stained glass window at Sewanee depicts Simkins handing a football to Henry D. Phillips.

==== 1899 ====
He was a member of the 1899 "Iron Men" of Sewanee that went undefeated and won 5 road games in 6 days all by shutout. Fuzzy Woodruff wrote of the only game in which Sewanee was scored upon, the 11 to 10 win over Auburn, "Under Heisman's tutelage, Auburn played with a marvelous speed and dash that couldn't be gainsaid and which fairly swept Sewanee off its feet. Only the remarkable punting of Simkins kept the game from being a debacle."

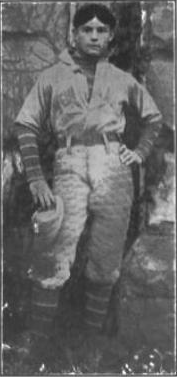
Simkins in 1900.

In a 1944 interview former coach Billy Suter said of Simkins, "one of the greatest football players I ever saw, a fine kicker, a fine ball carrier, and the most terrific tackler and blocker I ever saw." Simkins is the fullback on the All-Time Sewanee football team, one publication of which notes "Sewanee's greatest backfield ace, Ormond Simkins, unfortunately died some years ago from the effects of a football injury from which he never recovered after leaving college. A wonderful punter and a hard running ball carrier, he deserves much of the credit for Sewanee's wonder team of 1899."

A documentary film about the team and Simkins' role was released in 2022 called "Unrivaled: Sewanee 1899."

== Death ==
Simkins had suffered injuries to both legs while playing football. In later years, his left foot had to be amputated. While working for the War Risk Bureau in Washington, D. C. he entered Georgetown University Hospital in order to have the other one amputated, and died. Henry Seibels would later tell his two sons and an inquiring newsman it was Simkins, not he, who was the best player from Sewanee's 1899 team. A field house with his name is part of the Juhan Gym at Sewanee, where the school plays basketball.
