= Joseph F. Ware Jr. =

American engineer

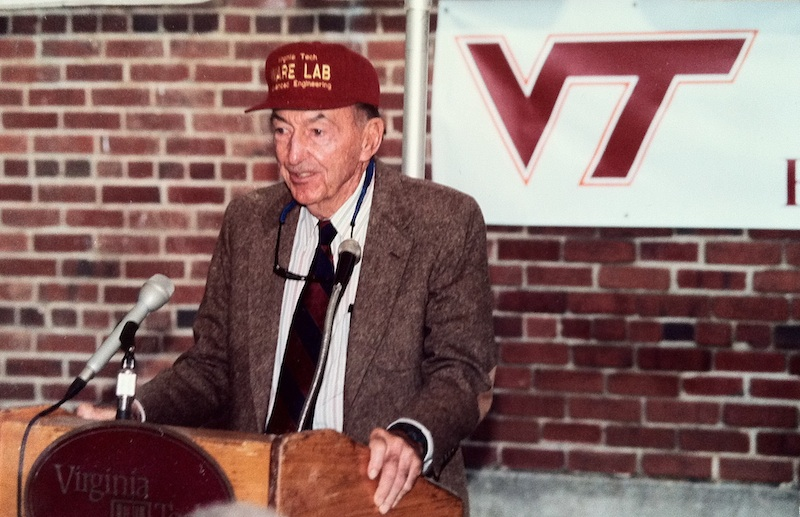
- Joe Ware opening the Joseph F. Ware Jr. Advanced Engineering Laboratory, the "Ware Lab," at Virginia Tech
- Born: Joseph Fulton Ware Jr. November 8, 1916; Blacksburg, Virginia, US
- Died: April 23, 2012 (aged 95)
- Resting place: Westview Cemetery, Blacksburg, VA
- Education: Virginia Tech (BS, 1937); Caltech (MSE, 1938)
- Occupation: Engineer
- Engineering career
- Discipline: Aerospace Engineering

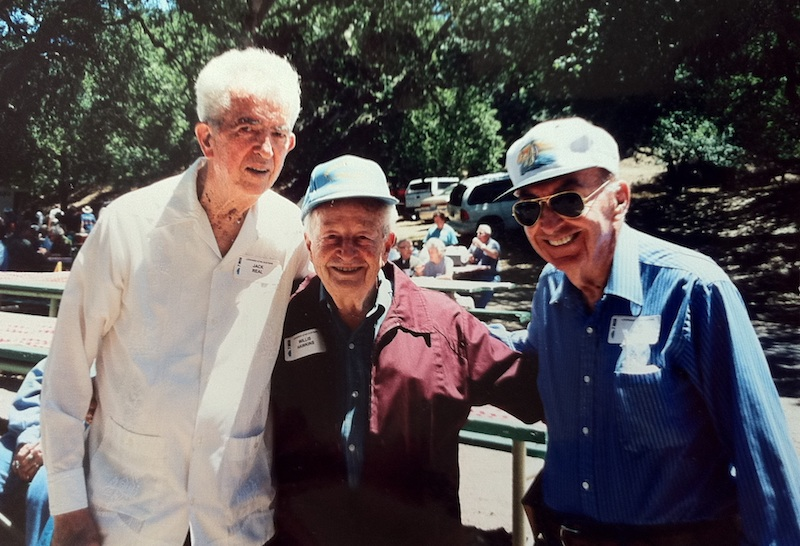
Jack Real, left; Willis Hawkins, center; Joseph Ware Jr., right

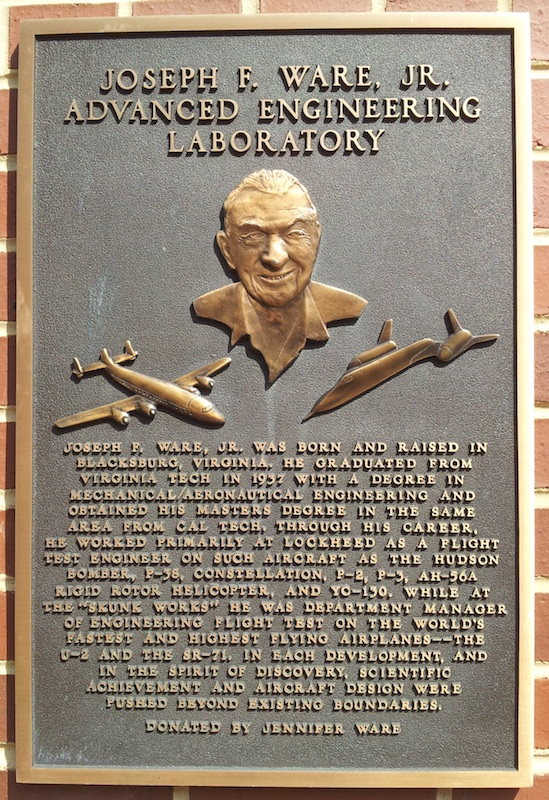
Ware Lab Plaque at Virginia Tech

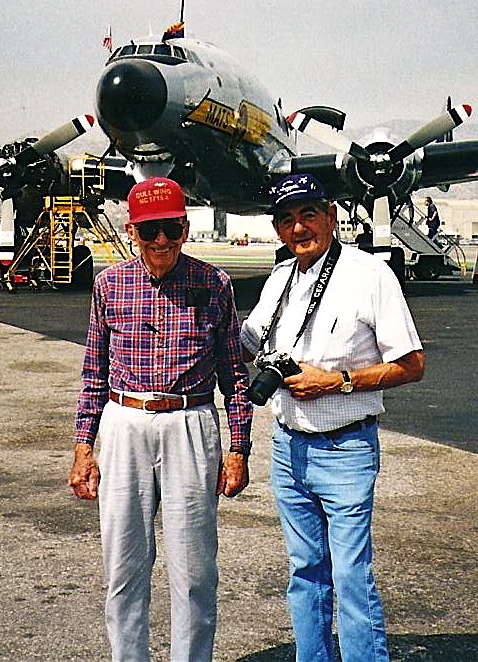
Joseph F. Ware Jr., left; Gil Cefaratt, right

Joseph Fulton "Joe" Ware Jr. (November 8, 1916 – April 23, 2012) was a flight test engineer at Clarence "Kelly" Johnson's famed Skunk Works in the Lockheed Corporation on the first two Air Force One's, the U-2, the SR-71 Blackbird, and many others from World War II and the Cold War, becoming Department Manager of Engineering Flight Test. He was the son of Joseph F. Ware Sr.

== Family history ==
Joe Ware was from the South, Virginia, and had family who fought in the American Civil War as well as the American Revolutionary War.

Ware was the son of Joseph F. Ware Sr., professor at Virginia Tech, U.S. Army officer, Commandant of the Virginia Tech Corps of Cadets, and football player.

== Early life and education ==
Ware was born in Blacksburg, Virginia. He enrolled in Virginia Polytechnic (now Virginia Tech) at age 15 and attended the Guggenheim Aeronautical Laboratory at the California Institute of Technology aged 20, graduating with a Master's in Aeronautical Engineering a year later in 1938.

== Early career ==
Ware worked as a test engineer at the Wright engine test facility at Paterson, New Jersey, then instructed mathematics at the Virginia Polytechnic Institute until he was hired as a flight test engineer at Lockheed in 1941, a few months before the attack on Pearl Harbor in December of that year. During World War II, as well as working in his career at Lockheed, he served in the Civil Air Patrol with Robert Cummings.

== Career at Lockheed ==
Ware was the flight test engineer in charge of numerous advanced military and reconnaissance aircraft at the Skunk Works, Lockheed, from 1941 to 1974, including but not limited to the Hudson Bomber, the P-38 Lightning, the AT-22 (Flight Engineer Trainer, Sheppard Field, TX) during WWII, the YP-80A, all radial-engined and turbo-prop variants of the Constellation, including (serial number) "1961" (Howard Hughes' former personal airplane which was used at Lockheed as an engine and prototype testbed) and the WV-2 (as well as the WV-2E roto-dome prototype), Columbines II and III (which were the first Air Force Ones for President Dwight D. Eisenhower), the P-2 series, the YP-3V1 Orion prototype and series including the P-3A&B, the YC-130 Hercules, the Model 286, Lockheed's XH-51 and AH-56 Cheyenne helicopters, the F-104 Starfighter, Lockheed's space shuttle proposal, and was also Department Manager of Engineering Flight Test for the U-2 and the SR-71 Blackbird. Area 51 was made a test base for the U-2 and was later used for flight testing the A-12 and the SR-71.

== In retirement ==
After retiring from Lockheed in 1974, Ware engaged in an active career in the United States Coast Guard Auxiliary attaining the rank of commander. A lifelong pilot, and holding a commercial certificate, he flew flag officers of the Coast Guard in his personal aircraft, such as a Beechcraft Duke and engaged in search and rescue operations with same, as well as his T-28, and also in counter terrorist activities with the Coast Guard on his boat. He and his third wife, Jenna, owned numerous airplanes, including but not limited to the T-28 Fennec and an award-winning 1937 SR-9B Stinson "Gullwing" Reliant.

On September 4, 1998, Ware, his wife Jenna Ware (social worker and transsexual), and Hayden Griffin, Ph.D. (Virginia Tech professor of engineering), co-founded the Joseph F. Ware Jr. Advanced Engineering Laboratory at Virginia Tech.
