= Percy Given =

American football player and coach

Georgetown Hoyas
- Position: Center

Personal information
- Listed weight: 225 lb (102 kg)

Career information
- College: Georgetown (1901–1904)

Awards and highlights
- All-Southern (1901, 1902); Second team All-time Georgetown football team Georgetown Athletic Hall of Fame

John Percy Given was a college football player and coach. He later sold cigars in Buffalo, New York.

== Georgetown ==
=== Player ===
He was an All-Southern center for the Georgetown Hoyas of Georgetown University, weighing 225 pounds. Georgetown authorities claimed it was Given, as opposed to Germany Schulz, who was the first "roving center" or linebacker in the game against Navy in 1902. Given was selected as the second team center for the Georgetown all-time football team. One writer called him "the greatest center that Georgetown has ever had."

=== Coach ===
Given assisted coaching the team in 1906 and 1908. He was inducted to the Georgetown Athletic Hall of Fame in 1953.
