= William Stewart Simkins =

American lawyer

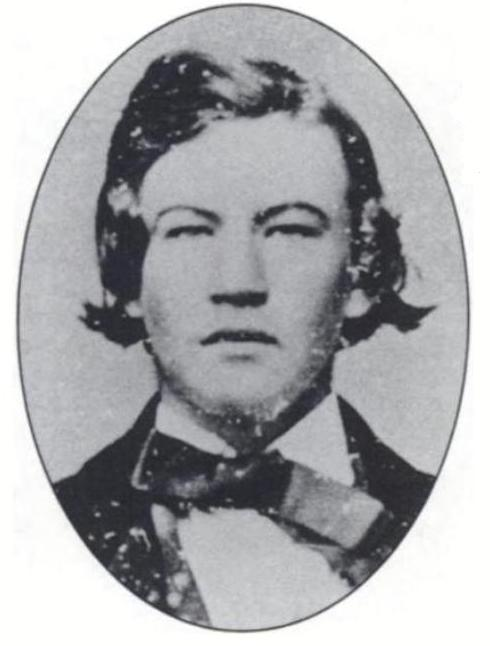
- Photographed as a cadet
- Born: August 25, 1842; Edgefield, South Carolina
- Died: February 27, 1929 (aged 86); Austin, Texas
- Occupation: Professor of law
- Spouse: Lizzie Ware

William Stewart Simkins (August 25, 1842 – February 27, 1929) was a Confederate soldier and professor of law at the University of Texas at Austin. While he was a Citadel cadet, he may have fired the first shot of the American Civil War.

== Early life ==
Simkins was born on August 25, 1842, in Edgefield, South Carolina. His parents were Eldred James and Pattie Simkins. He entered the Citadel, a South Carolina military academy, in 1856.

== Civil War ==
At daybreak on January 9, 1861, Simkins saw the signal from a guard boat, and sounded the alarm in the sand battery, alerting his fellow Citadel cadets to the arrival of the Union ship the Star of the West, which was attempting to ferry supplies to Fort Sumter. The cadets fired the first shots of the American Civil War. The Daily Courier at first said he had fired the first shot, although the official account later blamed a local youth named G. E. Haynesworth. Simkins once said he only loaded the gun which fired the first shot, though many historians believe that he actually fired it, too.

The cadets were graduated early on April 9. On the morning of April 12, 1861, Simkins, on duty near Charleston Harbor, participated in the bombardment of Fort Sumter, the first battle of the war.

He was commissioned as a first lieutenant of artillery. He oversaw a battery during the First Battle of Charleston Harbor on April 7, 1863. He is mentioned on September 19, 1863, as the inspector general for General Hagood. Simkins surrendered as a colonel in the army of Joseph E. Johnston in North Carolina in 1865.

== Post war activities ==
After the war he went to Monticello, Florida, where he and his brother, Eldred J. Simkins, organized the Florida Ku Klux Klan.

Simkins married Lizzie Ware on February 10, 1870. They had five children.

Simkins was admitted to the bar in 1870 and moved to Texas in 1873 where he practiced law at Corsicana. In 1885 he and his brother began a practice in Dallas. In 1894 he was, alongside Texas Attorney General Charles Allen Culberson, an appellant in two cases decided by the U.S. Supreme Court, Reagan v. Mercantile Trust Co. and Reagan v. Farmers' Loan & Trust Co.

== Professorship ==
Simkins joined the law faculty of the University of Texas in 1899.

Peregrinus, the mascot of the University of Texas School of Law, came from his course on Equity, after a drowsing student, Russell Savage, awoke halfway through Simkins's discussion of Roman law to the word "peregrinus" scrawled on the blackboard. Not understanding the context to Roman citizenship or a type of praetor, Savage made the first doodle of the four-legged duck-billed creature.

Simkins was himself nicknamed "Old Peregrinoos." First-year law students were known as "Simkins's Jackasses," and later by the initialism J.A.

His publications became standard textbooks in law schools in and beyond Texas. The University of the South in Sewanee, Tennessee, conferred an honorary doctorate of civil law upon him in 1913.

Simkins gave a yearly speech each Thanksgiving in which he decried Northern carpetbaggers who, he suggested, helped promote a culture of poverty among freed slaves, and proclaimed his belief that the South had overcome its racist past and had arisen once again as an economic powerhouse.

He became professor emeritus in 1923, but continued to lecture once a week until his death. There is no evidence to suggest he joined the second Klan that had reorganized in Georgia in 1915 and became a power in Texas in the 1920s. He was buried in Greenwood Cemetery in Dallas.

== Legacy ==
On the University of Texas campus, Simkins Hall dormitory was, for a time, named in his honor. The two-story dormitory was constructed near Waller Creek in the 1950s. Next door to the law school where Professor Simkins made his intellectual mark, it was originally the law student dormitory, but later moved into common undergraduate use.

In 2010, UT changed the name to Creekside Residence Hall after Professor Thomas D. Russell, a historian and former professor of law at UT, published a paper chronicling Simkins's role as the co-founder of the Florida Ku Klux Klan. University President William Powers, Jr., endorsed the change on July 12, 2010. The regents also changed the name "Simkins Park", a green space next to the dormitory which had been named for Simkins's brother, Eldred James Simkins.

== Personal life ==
Legendary Sewanee Tigers football player Ormond Simkins was his son.

== Partial bibliography ==
- Equity as Applied in the State and Federal Courts of Texas (1903)
- Contracts and Sales (1905)
- Administration of Estates in Texas (1908)
- A Federal Suit in Equity (1909)
- A Federal Suit at Law (1912)
- Title by Limitations in Texas (1924)
