= List of VMI Keydets football seasons =

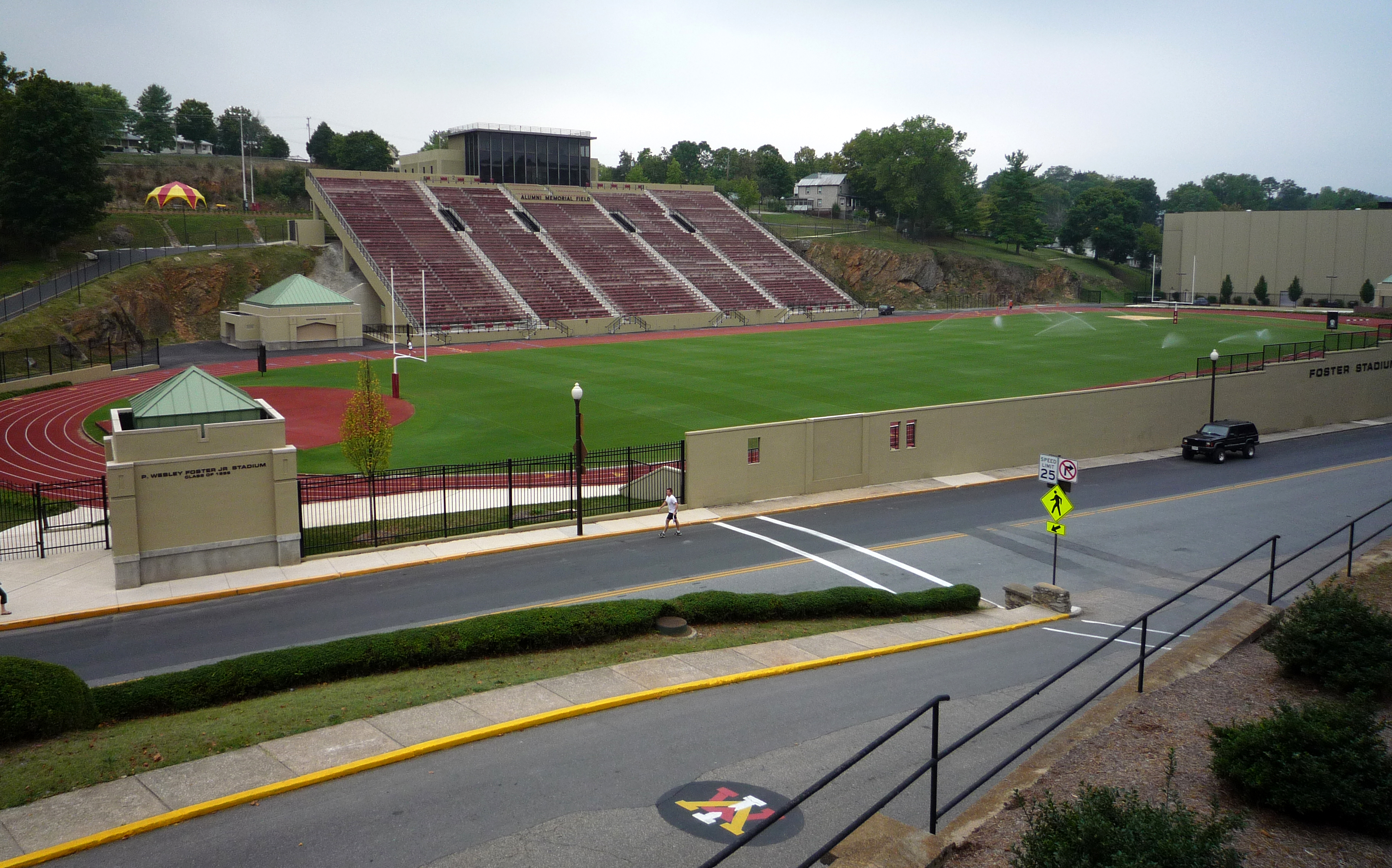
Alumni Memorial Field at Foster Stadium has served the Keydets' home contests since 1962

The following is a list of VMI Keydets football seasons. Representing the Virginia Military Institute (VMI), the VMI Keydets football program competes in the Southern Conference (SoCon) at the NCAA Division I Football Championship Subdivision (FCS) level. VMI competed in the SoCon for 79 years, from 1924 to 2002, and moved to the Big South Conference in 2003, but returned to the SoCon beginning in 2014. The Keydets have played their home games out of 10,000-seat Alumni Memorial Field since 1962. VMI is led by head coach Ashley Ingram, who took over in 2026.

Though VMI played its first intercollegiate football game in 1873 against Washington and Lee University, the first official team was fielded in 1891 under coach Walter Taylor. The program was successful early on, notching two undefeated seasons in 1894 and 1899, and another 9–0 campaign in 1920. VMI captured the first of seven conference titles in 1951 under head coach Tom Nugent with a 5–0 mark in SoCon play and a 7–3 record overall. The Keydets won four additional SoCon in a six-year span between 1957 and 1962 under the direction of John McKenna, who, to this day, is the all-time coaching wins in program history.

After playing as an independent, VMI joined the South Atlantic Intercollegiate Athletic Association (SAIAA) in 1918. In 2020, the Keydets earned their first trip to the NCAA Division I Football Championship playoffs since the subdivision's inception in 1978 after winning SoCon championship. This marked the program's first winning season since 1981. They followed up with another winning season in 2021, the first back-to-back winning campaigns since posting six straight from 1957 to 1962.

== Seasons ==
Legend

^{†} Conference champions
^{‡} Division champions
^Bowl game berth / playoff result

List of VMI Keydets football seasons
Season	Team	Head coach	Conference	Regular season results							Postseason results	Final ranking	
Season	Team	Head coach	Conference	Overall			Conference				Bowl game / playoff result	STATS Poll	Coaches Poll
Season	Team	Head coach	Conference	Win	Loss	Tie	Win	Loss	Tie	Finish	Bowl game / playoff result	STATS Poll	Coaches Poll
VMI Keydets
1891	1891	Walter Taylor	Independent	3	0	1					—	—	—
1892	1892	No coach	Independent	4	0	1					—	—	—
1893	1893	No coach	Independent	3	1	0					—	—	—
1894	1894	No coach	Independent	6	0	0					—	—	—
1895	1895	George W. Bryant	Independent	5	1	0					—	—	—
1896	1896	George W. Bryant	Independent	3	4	0					—	—	—
1897	1897	R. N. Groner	Independent	3	2	0					—	—	—
1898	1898	Sam Boyle	Independent	4	2	0					—	—	—
1899	1899 (Note: The season was cut short due to an outbreak of typhoid fever within the school, and all students were subsequently sent home.)	Sam Boyle	Independent	1	0	0					—	—	—
1900	1900	Sam Walker	Independent	4	1	2					—	—	—
1901	1901	Sam Walker	Independent	4	3	0					—	—	—
1902	1902	Sam Walker	Independent	3	3	1					—	—	—
1903	1903	Bill Roper	Independent	2	1	0					—	—	—
1904	1904	Bill Roper	Independent	3	5	0					—	—	—
1905	1905	Ira Johnson	Independent	2	5	1					—	—	—
1906	1906	Ira Johnson	Independent	4	4	0					—	—	—
1907	1907	Charles Roller	Independent	5	3	0					—	—	—
1908	1908	Charles Roller	Independent	4	2	0					—	—	—
1909	1909	William C. Gloth	Independent	4	3	0					—	—	—
1910	1910	William C. Gloth	Independent	3	3	1					—	—	—
1911	1911	Alpha Brumage	Independent	7	1	0					—	—	—
1912	1912	Alpha Brumage	Independent	6	1	0					—	—	—
1913	1913	Henry Poague	Independent	7	1	2					—	—	—
1914	1914	Frank Gorton	Independent	4	4	0					—	—	—
1915	1915	Frank Gorton	Independent	6	2	1					—	—	—
1916	1916	Frank Gorton	Independent	4	5	0					—	—	—
1917	1917	Earl Abell	Independent	4	4	1					—	—	—
1918	1918	Earl Abell; Mose Goodman	SAIAA	3	3	0					—	—	—
1919	1919	Red Fleming	SAIAA	6	2	0					—	—	—
1920	1920	Blandy Clarkson	SAIAA	9	0	0					—	—	—
1921	1921	Blandy Clarkson	SAIAA	3	5	1					—	—	—
1922	1922	Blandy Clarkson	Independent	7	2	0					—	—	—
1923	1923	Blandy Clarkson	Independent	9	1	0					—	—	—
1924	1924	Blandy Clarkson	Southern	6	3	1	2	3	1	13th	—	—	—
1925	1925	Blandy Clarkson	Southern	5	5	0	1	5	0	18th	—	—	—
1926	1926	Blandy Clarkson	Southern	5	5	0	2	4	0	15th	—	—	—
1927	1927	W. C. Raftery	Southern	6	4	0	2	4	0	16th	—	—	—
1928	1928	W. C. Raftery	Southern	5	3	2	2	3	1	15th	—	—	—
1929	1929	W. C. Raftery	Southern	8	2	0	4	2	0	7th	—	—	—
1930	1930	W. C. Raftery	Southern	3	6	0	0	5	0	23rd	—	—	—
1931	1931	W. C. Raftery	Southern	3	6	1	2	4	0	17th	—	—	—
1932	1932	W. C. Raftery	Southern	2	8	0	1	4	0	18th	—	—	—
1933	1933	W. C. Raftery	Southern	2	7	1	2	1	1	4th	—	—	—
1934	1934	W. C. Raftery	Southern	1	8	0	0	5	0	10th	—	—	—
1935	1935	W. C. Raftery	Southern	2	7	1	0	3	1	10th	—	—	—
1936	1936	W. C. Raftery	Southern	6	4	0	5	2	0	4th	—	—	—
1937	1937	Pooley Hubert	Southern	5	5	0	5	2	0	5th	—	—	—
1938	1938	Pooley Hubert	Southern	6	1	4	4	0	3	4th	—	—	—
1939	1939	Pooley Hubert	Southern	6	3	1	3	1	1	5th	—	—	—
1940	1940	Pooley Hubert	Southern	7	2	1	3	2	1	7th	—	—	—
1941	1941	Pooley Hubert	Southern	4	6	0	4	2	0	6th	—	—	—
1942	1942	Pooley Hubert	Southern	3	5	1	2	4	1	10th	—	—	—
1943	1943	Pooley Hubert	Southern	2	6	0	1	3	0	8th	—	—	—
1944	1944	Pooley Hubert	Southern	1	8	0	1	5	0	8th	—	—	—
1945	1945	Pooley Hubert	Southern	5	4	0	3	2	0	6th	—	—	—
1946	1946	Pooley Hubert	Southern	4	5	1	3	3	1	8th	—	—	—
1947	1947	Arthur Morton	Southern	3	5	1	2	3	1	11th	—	—	—
1948	1948	Arthur Morton	Southern	6	3	0	5	1	0	3rd	—	—	—
1949	1949	Tom Nugent	Southern	3	5	1	2	3	1	6th	—	—	—
1950	1950	Tom Nugent	Southern	6	4	0	5	1	0	3rd	—	—	—
1951	1951^{†}	Tom Nugent	Southern	7	3	0	5	0	0	1st^{†}	—	—	—
1952	1952	Tom Nugent	Southern	3	6	1	2	3	1	9th	—	—	—
1953	1953	John McKenna	Southern	5	5	0	3	3	0	6th	—	—	—
1954	1954	John McKenna	Southern	4	6	0	4	3	0	5th	—	—	—
1955	1955	John McKenna	Southern	1	9	0	1	6	0	9th	—	—	—
1956	1956	John McKenna	Southern	3	6	1	2	3	1	5th	—	—	—
1957	1957^{†}	John McKenna	Southern	9	0	1	6	0	0	1st^{†}	—	20	—
1958	1958	John McKenna	Southern	6	2	2	2	2	1	4th	—	—	—
1959	1959^{†}	John McKenna	Southern	8	1	1	5	0	1	1st^{†}	—	—	—
1960	1960^{†}	John McKenna	Southern	7	2	1	4	1	0	1st^{†}	—	—	—
1961	1961	John McKenna	Southern	6	4	0	4	2	0	3rd	—	—	—
1962	1962^{†}	John McKenna	Southern	6	4	0	6	0	0	1st^{†}	—	—	—
1963	1963	John McKenna	Southern	3	5	2	3	1	2	3rd	—	—	—
1964	1964	John McKenna	Southern	1	9	0	1	4	0	9th	—	—	—
1965	1965	John McKenna	Southern	3	7	0	3	2	0	4th	—	—	—
1966	1966	Vito Ragazzo	Southern	2	8	0	1	3	0	8th	—	—	—
1967	1967	Vito Ragazzo	Southern	6	4	0	2	3	0	5th	—	—	—
1968	1968	Vito Ragazzo	Southern	1	9	0	1	4	0	7th	—	—	—
1969	1969	Vito Ragazzo	Southern	0	10	0	0	4	0	7th	—	—	—
1970	1970	Vito Ragazzo	Southern	1	10	0	1	4	0	7th	—	—	—
1971	1971	Bob Thalman	Southern	1	10	0	1	4	0	6th	—	—	—
1972	1972	Bob Thalman	Southern	2	9	0	1	5	0	6th	—	—	—
1973	1973	Bob Thalman	Southern	3	8	0	2	4	0	6th	—	—	—
1974	1974^{†}	Bob Thalman	Southern	7	4	0	4	1	0	1st^{†}	—	—	—
1975	1975	Bob Thalman	Southern	3	8	0	1	4	0	7th	—	—	—
1976	1976	Bob Thalman	Southern	5	5	0	2	4	0	7th	—	—	—
1977	1977^{†}	Bob Thalman	Southern	7	4	0	4	1	0	1st^{†}	—	—	—
1978	1978	Bob Thalman	Southern	3	8	0	1	4	0	6th	—	—	—
1979	1979	Bob Thalman	Southern	6	4	1	4	1	0	2nd	—	—	—
1980	1980	Bob Thalman	Southern	3	7	1	1	4	1	6th	—	—	—
1981	1981	Bob Thalman	Southern	6	3	1	3	1	1	2nd	—	—	—
1982	1982	Bob Thalman	Southern	5	6	0	2	3	0	6th	—	—	—
1983	1983	Bob Thalman	Southern	2	9	0	1	5	0	6th	—	—	—
1984	1984	Bob Thalman	Southern	1	9	0	1	4	0	8th	—	—	—
1985	1985	Eddie Williamson	Southern	3	7	1	1	4	1	7th	—	—	—
1986	1986	Eddie Williamson	Southern	1	10	0	1	5	0	7th	—	—	—
1987	1987	Eddie Williamson	Southern	4	7	0	2	4	0	5th	—	—	—
1988	1988	Eddie Williamson	Southern	2	9	0	1	5	0	6th	—	—	—
1989	1989	Jim Shuck	Southern	2	8	1	1	4	1	7th	—	—	—
1990	1990	Jim Shuck	Southern	4	7	0	1	5	0	7th	—	—	—
1991	1991	Jim Shuck	Southern	4	7	0	2	5	0	6th	—	—	—
1992	1992	Jim Shuck	Southern	3	8	0	1	6	0	7th	—	—	—
1993	1993	Jim Shuck	Southern	1	10	0	1	7	0	9th	—	—	—
1994	1994	Bill Stewart	Southern	1	10	0	1	7	0	9th	—	—	—
1995	1995	Bill Stewart	Southern	4	7	0	3	5	0	6th	—	—	—
1996 (Note: Overtime rules were added to college football in 1996, thereby eliminating ties.)	1996	Bill Stewart	Southern	3	8		2	6		7th	—	—	—
1997	1997	Ted Cain	Southern	0	11		0	8		9th	—	—	—
1998	1998	Ted Cain	Southern	1	10		0	8		9th	—	—	—
1999	1999	Cal McCombs	Southern	1	10		0	8		9th	—	—	—
2000	2000	Cal McCombs	Southern	2	9		1	7		9th	—	—	—
2001	2001	Cal McCombs	Southern	1	10		1	7		9th	—	—	—
2002	2002	Cal McCombs	Southern	6	6		3	5		6th	—	—	—
2003	2003	Cal McCombs	Big South	6	6		2	2		3rd	—	—	—
2004	2004	Cal McCombs	Big South	0	11		0	4		5th	—	—	—
2005	2005	Cal McCombs	Big South	3	8		2	2		4th	—	—	—
2006	2006	Jim Reid	Big South	1	10		0	4		5th	—	—	—
2007	2007	Jim Reid	Big South	2	9		0	4		5th	—	—	—
2008	2008	Sparky Woods	Big South	4	7		1	4		6th	—	—	—
2009	2009	Sparky Woods	Big South	2	9		1	5		6th	—	—	—
2010	2010	Sparky Woods	Big South	3	8		2	4		5th	—	—	—
2011	2011	Sparky Woods	Big South	2	9		2	4		6th	—	—	—
2012	2012	Sparky Woods	Big South	2	9		1	5		6th	—	—	—
2013	2013	Sparky Woods	Big South	2	10		1	4		6th	—	—	—
2014	2014	Sparky Woods	Southern	2	10		1	6		8th	—	—	—
2015	2015	Scott Wachenheim	Southern	2	9		1	6		8th	—	—	—
2016	2016	Scott Wachenheim	Southern	3	8		1	7		9th	—	—	—
2017	2017	Scott Wachenheim	Southern	0	11		0	8		9th	—	—	—
2018	2018	Scott Wachenheim	Southern	1	10		0	8		9th	—	—	—
2019	2019	Scott Wachenheim	Southern	5	7		4	4		4th	—	—	—
2020 (Note: The fall 2020 SoCon season was delayed due to the COVID-19 pandemic, with league play resuming in a shortened spring 2021 season.)	2020^{†}	Scott Wachenheim	Southern	6	2		6	1		1st^{†}	NCAA Division I FCS Playoffs – First Round ^	12	12
2021	2021	Scott Wachenheim	Southern	6	5		4	4		T–4th	—	—	—
2022	2022	Scott Wachenheim	Southern	1	10		0	8		9th	—	—	—
2023	2023	Danny Rocco	Southern	5	6		4	4		T–5th	—	—	—
2024	2024	Danny Rocco	Southern	1	10		1	7		9th	—	—	—
2025	2025	Danny Rocco	Southern	1	11		0	8		9th	—	—	—
2026	2026	Ashley Ingram	Southern	0	12		0	8		10th	—	—	—
Totals				All-time: 499–770–42 (.397)			Conference: 206–397–23 (.347)				Postseason: 0–1 (.000)		
