= List of VMI Keydets head football coaches =

The VMI Keydets football team competes in the Southern Conference of the National Collegiate Athletic Association and the Football Championship Subdivision, representing the Virginia Military Institute in Lexington, Virginia. Since its inception in 1891, the program has had 33 head coaches.

Although the origins of VMI football date back to 1873, the first organized football team did not appear until 1891. The first head coach was Walter Taylor, the son of Walter H. Taylor, a prominent banker, lawyer, and aide-de-camp to Robert E. Lee. Notable coaches include Blandy Clarkson, who spent seven seasons with the Keydets and led the team to their first undefeated season in 1920; John McKenna, the school's all-time most victorious coach who compiled a record of 62–60–8 in thirteen seasons with VMI while winning four Southern Conference championships; and Bob Thalman, the second most victorious coach who led the team to the 1974 and 1977 conference titles. The most recent Keydet head coach was Sparky Woods, who coached seven seasons for the Keydets before being let go by the school in 2014. In over 120 years of football, VMI has an all-time record of 485–718–42 (.406).

== Key ==
Key to symbols in coaches list
General		Overall		Conference		Postseason (Note: Although the first Rose Bowl Game was played in 1902, it has been continuously played since the 1916 game, and is recognized as the oldest bowl game by the NCAA. "—" indicates any season prior to 1916 when postseason games were not played.)	
No.	Order of coaches (Note: A running total of the number of head coaches, with coaches who served separate tenures being counted only once. Interim head coaches are represented with "Int" and are not counted in the running total. "—" indicates the team played but either without a coach or no coach is on record. "X" indicates an interim year without play.)	GC	Games coached	CW	Conference wins	PW	Postseason wins
DC	Division championships	OW	Overall wins	CL	Conference losses	PL	Postseason losses
CC	Conference championships	OL	Overall losses	CT	Conference ties	PT	Postseason ties
NC	National championships	OT	Overall ties (Note: Overtime rules in college football were introduced in 1996, making ties impossible in the period since.)	C%	Conference winning percentage		
†	Elected to the College Football Hall of Fame	O%	Overall winning percentage (Note: When computing the win–loss percentage, a tie counts as half a win and half a loss.)				

== Coaches ==
List of head football coaches showing season(s) coached, overall records, conference records, postseason records, championships and selected awards
#	Name	Season(s) (Note: From 1892 to 1894, the team had no coach.)	GC	W	L	T	W%	CW	CL	CT	C%	PW	PL	PT	CCs	NCs	National awards
1	Walter Taylor	1891	4	3	0	1	.875	—	—	—	—	—	—	—	—	—	—
2	George Bryant	1895–1896	13	8	5	0	.615	—	—	—	—	—	—	—	—	—	—
3	R. N. Groner	1897	5	3	2	0	.600	—	—	—	—	—	—	—	—	—	—
4	Samuel Boyle, Jr.	1899	7	5	2	0	.714	—	—	—	—	—	—	—	—	—	—
5	Sam Walker	1900–1902	21	11	7	3	.595	—	—	—	—	—	—	—	—	—	—
6	William Roper^{†}	1903–1904	11	5	6	0	.455	—	—	—	—	—	—	—	—	—	—
7	Ira Johnson	1905–1906	16	6	9	1	.406	—	—	—	—	—	—	—	—	—	—
8	Charles Roller	1907–1908	13	8	5	0	.615	—	—	—	—	—	—	—	—	—	—
9	William C. Gloth	1909–1910	14	7	6	1	.536	—	—	—	—	—	—	—	—	—	—
10	Alpha Brummage	1911–1912	16	14	2	0	.875	—	—	—	—	—	—	—	—	—	—
11	Henry Poague	1913	10	7	1	2	.800	—	—	—	—	—	—	—	—	—	—
12	Frank Gorton	1914–1916	26	14	16	1	.558	—	—	—	—	—	—	—	—	—	—
13	Earl Abell	1917	9	4	4	1	.500	—	—	—	—	—	—	—	—	—	—
14	Earl Abell; Mose Goodman	1918	4	1	3	0	.250	—	—	—	—	—	—	—	—	—	—
15	Red Fleming	1919	8	6	2	0	.750	—	—	—	—	—	—	—	—	—	—
16	Blandy Clarkson	1920–1926	67	45	20	2	.687	5	12	1	.306	—	—	—	—	—	—
17	W. C. Raftery	1927–1936	98	38	55	5	.413	18	33	3	.361	—	—	—	—	—	—
18	Allison Hubert	1937–1946	96	43	45	8	.490	29	24	7	.650	—	—	—	—	—	—
19	Arthur Morton	1947–1948	18	9	8	1	.339	7	4	1	.625	—	—	—	—	—	—
20	Tom Nugent	1949–1952	39	19	18	2	.513	15	6	1	.705	—	—	—	1	—	—
21	John McKenna	1953–1965	130	62	60	8	.508	44	27	5	.612	—	—	—	4	—	—
22	Vito Ragazzo	1966–1970	51	10	41	0	.196	5	18	0	.217	—	—	—	—	—	—
23	Bob Thalman	1971–1984	151	54	94	3	.368	25	43	2	.371	—	—	—	2	—	—
24	Eddie Williamson	1985–1988	44	10	33	1	.239	5	18	1	.229	—	—	—	—	—	—
25	Jim Shuck	1989–1993	55	14	40	1	.264	6	37	1	.191	—	—	—	—	—	—
26	Bill Stewart	1994–1996	33	8	25	0	.242	7	17	0	.292	—	—	—	—	—	—
27	Ted Cain (Note: Cain was fired with one game remaining in the 1998 season, leaving Donny White to coach the final game on an interim basis. VMI lost the game to The Citadel, 36–10.)	1997–1998	21	1	20		.048	0	16		.000	—	—	—	—	—	—
28	Cal McCombs	1999–2005	79	19	60		.241	9	35		.205	—	—	—	—	—	—
29	Jim Reid	2006–2007	22	3	19		.136	0	8		.000	—	—	—	—	—	—
30	Sparky Woods	2008–2014	79	17	62		.215	9	32		.220	—	—	—	—	—	—
31	Scott Wachenheim	2015–2022	86	24	62		.279	16	46		.258	—	1	—	1	—	—
32	Danny Rocco	2023–2025	35	7	28	—	.200	5	19	—	.208	—	—	—	—	—	—
33	Ashley Ingram	2026–present	6	0	6	—	.000	0	2	—	.000	—	—	—	—	—	—
