= 1901 Furman Baptists football team =

American college football season

1901 Furman Baptists football
- Conference: Independent
- Record: 1–2–1
- Head coach: Charles Roller (1st season)
- Captain: A. T. Sublett

1901 Southern college football independents records
	Conf.			Overall
Team	W	L	T	W		L		T
Southwestern Louisiana Industrial		–		2	–	0	–	0
Stetson		–		1	–	0	–	0
Georgia Tech		–		4	–	0	–	1
Marshall		–		2	–	0	–	1
Kentucky University		–		7	–	1	–	1
VPI		–		6	–	1	–	0
Nashville		–		6	–	1	–	1
Virginia		–		8	–	2	–	0
Texas		–		8	–	2	–	1
Davidson		–		4	–	2	–	0
Baylor		–		5	–	3	–	0
Gallaudet		–		4	–	2	–	2
Sewanee		–		4	–	2	–	2
William & Mary		–		2	–	1	–	1
Navy		–		6	–	4	–	1
VMI		–		4	–	3	–	0
Oklahoma		–		3	–	2	–	0
West Virginia		–		3	–	2	–	0
Delaware		–		5	–	4	–	0
Georgetown		–		3	–	3	–	2
Kendall		–		2	–	2	–	0
Spring Hill		–		0	–	0	–	1
Wilmington Conference Academy		–		2	–	2	–	0
Oklahoma A&M		–		2	–	3	–	0
South Carolina		–		3	–	4	–	0
Arkansas		–		3	–	5	–	0
Add-Ran		–		1	–	2	–	1
Furman		–		1	–	2	–	1
Chilocco		–		2	–	5	–	0
North Carolina A&M		–		1	–	2	–	0
Texas A&M		–		1	–	4	–	0
Maryland		–		1	–	7	–	0
Richmond		–		1	–	7	–	0
Florida Agricultural		–		0	–	1	–	0
Louisiana Industrial		–		0	–	2	–	0
Tusculum		–				–

The 1901 Furman Baptists football team was an American football team that represented Furman University as an independent during the 1901 college football season. In its first season under head coach Charles Roller, Furman compiled a 1–2–1 record. The team played its home games in Greenville, South Carolina.

== Schedule ==
Date	Opponent	Site	Result	Source
October 15	at Georgia Tech	Piedmont Park; Atlanta, GA	L 0–17	
October 22	at South Carolina	Columbia, SC	L 0–12	
October 26	Georgia Tech	Greenville, SC	T 5–5	
November 28	Wofford	Greenville, SC (rivalry)	W 17–0	
