= Aflex, Kentucky =

Unincorporated community in Kentucky, United States

Aflex
- Unincorporated community
- Location within the state of Kentucky Aflex (the United States)
- Coordinates: 37°39′29″N 82°14′51″W
- Country: United States
- State: Kentucky
- County: Pike
- Elevation: 669 ft (204 m)
- Time zone: UTC-6 (Central (CST))
  - Summer (DST): UTC-5 (CST)
- GNIS feature ID: 485789

Aflex is an unincorporated community and coal town in Pike County, Kentucky, United States.

== History ==
A post office called Aflex was established in 1916, and remained in operation until 1988. The community derives its name from A. F. Leckie, a businessperson in the coal-mining industry.
