= Vito Ragazzo =

American football player, coach, and scout (1927–2017)

Biographical details
- Born: March 17, 1927; Aflex, Kentucky, U.S.
- Died: February 13, 2017 (aged 89); Chapel Hill, North Carolina, U.S.

Playing career
- 1947–1950: William & Mary
- 1953–1954: Hamilton Tiger-Cats
- Positions: End, defensive back

Coaching career (HC unless noted)
- 1950s: William Byrd HS (VA)
- 1956–1960: VMI (line)
- 1961–1965: North Carolina (assistant)
- 1966–1970: VMI
- 1971–1973: East Carolina (OC)
- 1977–1978: Wake Forest (assistant)
- 1979–1985: Shippensburg

Administrative career (AD unless noted)
- 1986–1988: New England Patriots (scout)

Head coaching record
- Overall: 51–72–1 (college)
- Tournaments: 1–1 (NCAA D-II playoffs)

Accomplishments and honors

Championships
- PSAC (1981); PSAC West Division (1981)

Awards
- Virginia College Coach of the Year in Portsmouth (1967); Pennsylvania College Coach of the Year (1981); College Coach of the Year by AFCA and Eastman Kodak (1982); First-team All-SoCon (1949)

Vito Eupollio Ragazzo (March 17, 1927 – February 13, 2017) was an American gridiron football player, coach, and scout. He played college football at the College of William & Mary and professionally with the Hamilton Tiger-Cats of the Interprovincial Rugby Football Union, a forerunner of the Canadian Football League (CFL). Ragazzo served as the head football coach at the Virginia Military Institute (VMI) from 1966 to 1970 and at Shippensburg University of Pennsylvania from 1979 to 1985, compiling a career college football coaching record of 51–72–1.

== Early life and playing career ==
Ragazzo was born on March 17, 1927, in Aflex, Kentucky. He attended Williamson High School in Williamson, West Virginia, where he played football as an end and was a teammate of Dick Hensley. He was inducted into the Williamson High School Athletic Hall of Fame as a member of the inaugural class in 1998. Ragazzo played college football at the College of William & Mary. In his college career with the William & Mary Indians, he caught 15 touchdown passes, which stood as an National Collegiate Athletic Association (NCAA) record from 1949 until Howard Twilley of Tulsa broke it in 1965.

== Head coaching record ==
=== College ===
| Year | Team | Overall | Conference | Standing | Bowl/playoffs | NCAA Division II^{#} |
|---|---|---|---|---|---|---|
VMI Keydets (Southern Conference) (1966–1970)
| 1966 | VMI | 2–8 | 1–3 | 8th | | |
| 1967 | VMI | 6–4 | 2–3 | T–5th | | |
| 1968 | VMI | 1–9 | 1–3 | T–5th | | |
| 1969 | VMI | 0–10 | 0–4 | T–6th | | |
| 1970 | VMI | 1–10 | 1–4 | 7th | | |
| VMI: | | 10–41 | 5–17 | | | |
Shippensburg Red Raiders (Pennsylvania State Athletic Conference) (1979–1985)
| 1979 | Shippensburg | 4–6 | 2–4 | T–4th (West) | | |
| 1980 | Shippensburg | 5–4–1 | 3–2–1 | T–2nd (West) | | |
| 1981 | Shippensburg | 12–1 | 6–0 | 1st (West) | L NCAA Division II Semifinal | 8 |
| 1982 | Shippensburg | 7–3 | 4–2 | T–2nd (West) | | |
| 1983 | Shippensburg | 4–6 | 1–5 | 6th (West) | | |
| 1984 | Shippensburg | 4–6 | 1–5 | T–6th (West) | | |
| 1985 | Shippensburg | 5–5 | 3–3 | T–3rd (West) | | |
| Shippensburg: | | 41–31–1 | 20–21–1 | | | |
| Total: | | 51–72–1 | | | | |
National championship Conference title Conference division title or championship game berth

== See also ==
- List of NCAA major college football yearly receiving leaders
