= Earl Abell =

American football player and coach, basketball coach (1892–1956)

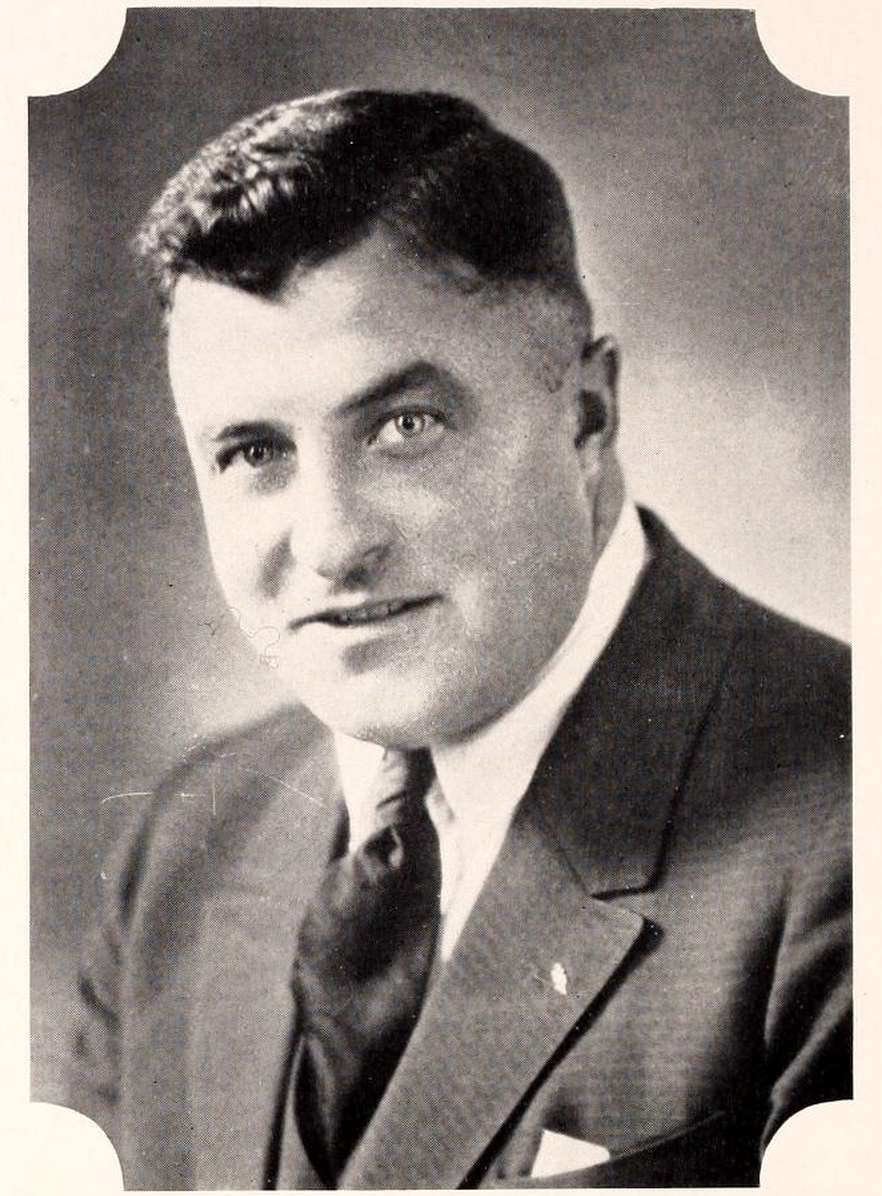
- Abell pictured in Reveille 1925, Mississippi State yearbook

Biographical details
- Born: May 29, 1892; Portage, Wisconsin, U.S.
- Died: May 26, 1956 (aged 63); Pardeeville, Wisconsin, U.S.

Playing career

Football
- 1912–1915: Colgate
- Position: Tackle

Coaching career (HC unless noted)

Football
- 1917–1918: VMI
- 1919–1920: Sewanee
- 1922: Virginia (line)
- 1923–1924: Mississippi A&M
- 1925–1927: Colgate (assistant)
- 1928: Colgate
- 1929–1930: Virginia

Basketball
- 1917–1919: VMI

Head coaching record
- Overall: 38–34–6 (football); 14–12 (basketball)

Accomplishments and honors

Awards
- First-team All-American (1915)
- College Football Hall of Fame; Inducted in 1973 (profile)

Earl Clark "Tuffy" Abell (May 29, 1892 – May 26, 1956) was an American college football player and coach. He played football as a tackle at Colgate University. He later returned to Colgate as an assistant coach in 1925, and took over the head coaching job in 1928. He spent the 1929 and 1930 football seasons as head football coach at the University of Virginia. Abell was inducted into the College Football Hall of Fame as player in 1973.

== Early life ==
Abell attended Portage High School in Portage, Wisconsin.

== Coaching career ==
=== VMI ===
Abell was the 13th head football coach at Virginia Military Institute (VMI) in Lexington, Virginia, serving for two seasons, from 1917 to 1918, and compiling a record of 7–7–1.

=== Colgate ===
Abell was the 22nd head football coach at Colgate University in the Hamilton New York, serving for the 1928 season, and compiling a record of 6–3.

== Personal life ==
Born in Portage, Wisconsin, Abell attended Colgate University, where he became a member of the Delta Kappa Epsilon fraternity. Abell was married and had three children. He worked for the American Can Company upon retiring from coaching. He died of a heart attack on May 26, 1956.

== Head coaching record ==
=== Football ===
Year	Team	Overall	Conference	Standing	Bowl/playoffs
VMI Keydets (Independent) (1917–1918)
1917	VMI	4–4–1			
1918	VMI	3–3			
VMI:		7–7–1			
Sewanee Tigers (Independent) (1919–1920)
1919	Sewanee	3–6			
1920	Sewanee	4–3–1			
Sewanee:		7–9–1			
Mississippi A&M Aggies (Southern Conference) (1923–1924)
1923	Mississippi A&M	5–2–2	2–1–2	T–9th	
1924	Mississippi A&M	5–4	3–2	T–6th	
Mississippi A&M:		10–6–2	5–3–2		
Colgate (Independent) (1928)
1928	Colgate	6–3			
Colgate:		6–3			
Virginia Cavaliers (Southern Conference) (1929–1930)
1929	Virginia	4–3–2	1–3–2	16th	
1930	Virginia	4–6	2–5	17th	
Virginia:		8–9–2	3–8–2		
Total:		38–34–6			

Note: In the 1918 season, Abell served as a co-coach alongside Mose Goodman.

=== Basketball ===
Record table
Season	Team	Overall	Conference	Standing	Postseason
VMI Keydets (Independent) (1917–1919)
1917–18	VMI	6–6			
1918–19	VMI	8–6			
VMI:		14–12			
Total:		14–12			
