= Tom Nugent =

American football coach (1913–2006)

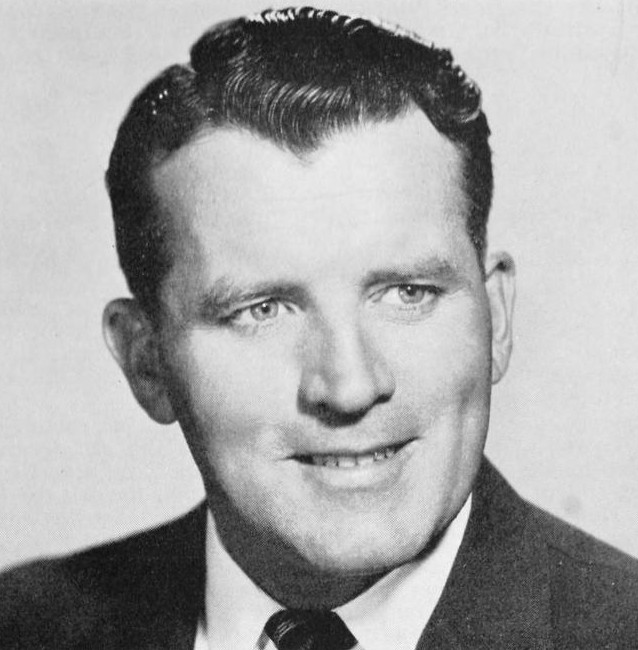

Biographical details
- Born: February 24, 1913; Lawrence, Massachusetts, U.S.
- Died: January 19, 2006 (aged 92); Tallahassee, Florida, U.S.

Playing career
- 1930s: Ithaca

Coaching career (HC unless noted)
- ?–1948: Hopewell HS (VA)
- 1949–1952: VMI
- 1953–1958: Florida State
- 1959–1965: Maryland

Administrative career (AD unless noted)
- 1951–1953: VMI
- 1957–1958: Florida State

Head coaching record
- Overall: 89–80–3 (college)
- Bowls: 0–2

Accomplishments and honors

Championships
- 1 SoCon (1951)

Thomas N. Nugent (February 24, 1913 – January 19, 2006) was an American college football coach and innovator, sportscaster, public relations man. He served as the head football coach at the Virginia Military Institute, Florida State University, and the University of Maryland. His career record was 89–80–3. Nugent is credited with the development of the I formation.

== Early life ==
Nugent, a native of Lawrence, Massachusetts, attended Ithaca College in upstate New York, where he played baseball, basketball, football, and track, and earned ten varsity letters. He graduated from Ithaca in 1936.

During World War II, Nugent served in the United States Army Air Corps and attained the rank of captain. He worked as a fitness instructor for deploying officers, and later, as the director of entertainment of a military installation in Missouri.

== Coaching career ==
=== VMI and the "I" formation ===
Nugent began his football coaching career at the interscholastic level in Virginia. In January 1949, while coaching at Hopewell High School, he was hired by the Virginia Military Institute to replace head coach Slick Morton who had resigned to take over at Mississippi State.

In his first game as a collegiate coach, William & Mary routed VMI, 54–6. The Indians' head coach, Rube McCray, said he would never lose to a former high school coach. To counteract William & Mary's large defensive line and linebacker corps, Nugent began developing the I formation, which he debuted the following year in 1950. VMI beat William & Mary, 28–23 and upset 28-point favorite Georgia Tech, 14–13. The Keydets posted over 400 offensive yards in both contests. The new formation's success prompted Notre Dame head coach Frank Leahy to send two assistant coaches to observe VMI's spring practice the following year. In the second quarter of the 1951 season opener against Indiana, Notre Dame used the I formation to score four touchdowns. Nugent began giving coaching clinics on the I formation, and in 1961, John McKay replaced his pro T with the I at Southern California. McKay's success with the formation the following season prompted more teams to adopt it around the country. The I formation's invention is occasionally misattributed to McKay or Leahy, to which Nugent responded, "It's something that's long been misunderstood ... But all you have to do is look it up."

Before the 1951 season, VMI was said to have "the finest assortment of material since Bosh Pritchard and Joe Muha." The Keydets finished 7–3 for a share of the Southern Conference co-championship. In January 1952, the Washington State University was reportedly interested in hiring Nugent as its head coach.

=== Florida State ===
Nugent took over as head coach at Florida State University in 1953, and brought with him the I formation. He said, "People were very skeptical at first. They said it would never work. But it didn't take long to realize we were onto something big." The Florida State football program was less than a decade old, and the previous season's team had only managed one win.

In 1954, Florida State finished with an 8–3 record and earned an invitation to the 1955 Sun Bowl, the school's first postseason game on New Year's Day. They were defeated by Texas Western, 47–20. During his last season at FSU in 1958, Nugent led the Seminoles to a 7–3 record and earned an invitation to play Oklahoma State in the 1958 Bluegrass Bowl, where they were defeated, 15–6. 1958 was also the first year that Florida State played in-state rival Florida. Setting up the match-up required years of haggling and negotiations between the schools and with his counterpart, Florida athletic director and head coach Bob Woodruff, about whom Nugent said, "It seems he wants us to promise everything but lose the game."

During his tenure at Florida State, Nugent served as athletic director and coached ESPN analyst Lee Corso and actor Burt Reynolds. Reynolds said, "He put FSU on the map in the early years." His overall record at Florida State was 34–28–1.

=== Maryland ===
At the first practice before the 1959 season, Nugent addressed his team, "Hi, I'm Tom Nugent and I hate West Virginia." The Mountaineers were Maryland's first opponent of the season, and Nugent guided the Terrapins to a 27–7 victory in that game.

In 1961, Nugent's Maryland team became the first college football program in the nation to put players' names on the back of their jerseys. That season, he led the Terrapins to the best season of his tenure and finished with a 7–3 record. A highlight of the season was the 21–17 defeat of Penn State, the only Maryland victory of the series until 2014. The Terrapins also defeated seventh-ranked Syracuse, 22–21.

Nugent amassed a 36–34 record during his tenure at Maryland. He remained the last Maryland coach to win his inaugural game with the team until Ralph Friedgen matched that feat in 2001.

Under Nugent, in 1962, Maryland integrated its football team after Darryl Hill caught the eye of Maryland assistant coach Lee Corso, who had been encouraged by Nugent to find a black athlete to play for his team. Hill became not only the first African-American football player at Maryland but the first in the Atlantic Coast Conference and at any college or university in "the old South."

== Later life ==
Upon the conclusion of his coaching career, Nugent worked as a sports broadcaster. In the late 1960s, he spent four years with ABC affiliate WPLG in Miami. In the 1970s, he worked in public relations, including at the Florida Institute of Technology in Melbourne, Florida.

In 1970, Ithaca College inducted Nugent into its Ithaca Sports Hall of Fame. The Florida State University Hall of Fame inducted Nugent in 1983. He has also been inducted into the Florida Sports Hall of Fame. In 1998, he received the Ithaca College Alumni Association's Lifetime Achievement Award. The National Football Foundation bestowed upon him the Outstanding Contribution to Amateur Football Award in 2000.

Nugent was married to wife Peg in 1941, and the couple had five sons and four daughters. He survived his wife, who died in 2002. He retired, first to Indian Harbor Beach, Florida in the 1980s, and then the Westminster Oaks Health Center in Tallahassee, Florida, where he died of congestive heart failure on January 19, 2006.

== Head coaching record ==
=== College ===
Year	Team	Overall	Conference	Standing	Bowl/playoffs
VMI Keydets (Southern Conference) (1949–1952)
1949	VMI	3–5–1	3–2–1	6th	
1950	VMI	6–4	5–1	3rd	
1951	VMI	7–3	5–0	T–1st	
1952	VMI	3–6–1	2–3–1	9th	
VMI:		19–18–2	15–6–1		
Florida State Seminoles (Independent) (1953–1958)
1953	Florida State	5–5			
1954	Florida State	8–4			L Sun
1955	Florida State	5–5			
1956	Florida State	5–4–1			
1957	Florida State	4–6			
1958	Florida State	7–4			L Bluegrass
Florida State:		34–28–1			
Maryland Terrapins (Atlantic Coast Conference) (1959–1965)
1959	Maryland	5–5	4–2	3rd	
1960	Maryland	6–4	5–2	3rd	
1961	Maryland	7–3	3–3	T–3rd	
1962	Maryland	6–4	5–2	3rd	
1963	Maryland	3–7	2–5	5th	
1964	Maryland	5–5	4–3	T–3rd	
1965	Maryland	4–6	3–3	T–3rd	
Maryland:		36–34	26–20		
Total:		89–80–3			
National championship Conference title Conference division title or championship game berth
