= John McKenna (American football) =

American football player, coach, and administrator (1914–2007)

- McKenna, c. 1967

Biographical details
- Born: November 12, 1914; Lawrence, Massachusetts, U.S.
- Died: March 31, 2007 (aged 94); Decatur, Georgia, U.S.

Playing career
- 1935–1937: Villanova

Coaching career (HC unless noted)
- 1946: Malvern Prep (PA)
- 1947–1948: Villanova (assistant)
- 1949–1951: Loyola (CA) (assistant)
- 1952: VMI (assistant)
- 1953–1965: VMI

Administrative career (AD unless noted)
- 1972–1979: Georgia Tech (associate AD)

Head coaching record
- Overall: 62–60–8 (college)

Accomplishments and honors

Championships
- 4 SoCon (1957, 1959–1960, 1962)

John McKenna (November 12, 1914 – March 31, 2007) was an American football player, coach, and college athletics administrator. He served as the head football coach at the Virginia Military Institute (VMI) for 13 seasons, from 1953 until 1965, compiling a record of 62–60–8. McKenna's teams won four Southern Conference championships and his 62 wins are the most of any coach in VMI Keydets football history. McKenna died on March 31, 2007, at his home in Decatur, Georgia.

He was inducted into the Virginia Sports Hall of Fame in 2007.

== Head coaching record ==
=== College ===
Year	Team	Overall	Conference	Standing	Bowl/playoffs	AP^{#}
VMI Keydets (Southern Conference) (1953–1965)
1953	VMI	5–5	3–3	T–5th		
1954	VMI	4–6	4–3	5th		
1955	VMI	1–9	1–6	9th		
1956	VMI	3–6–1	2–3–1	5th		
1957	VMI	9–0–1	6–0	1st		20
1958	VMI	6–2–2	2–2–1	4th		
1959	VMI	8–1–1	5–0–1	1st		
1960	VMI	7–2–1	4–1	1st		
1961	VMI	6–4	4–2	T–3rd		
1962	VMI	6–4	6–0	1st		
1963	VMI	3–5–2	3–1–2	3rd		
1964	VMI	1–9	1–4	T–8th		
1965	VMI	3–7	3–2	4th		
VMI:		62–60–8	44–27–5			
Total:		62–60–8				
National championship Conference title Conference division title or championship game berth
^{#}Rankings from final AP Poll.
