= Blandy Clarkson =

American football coach and college athletics administrator

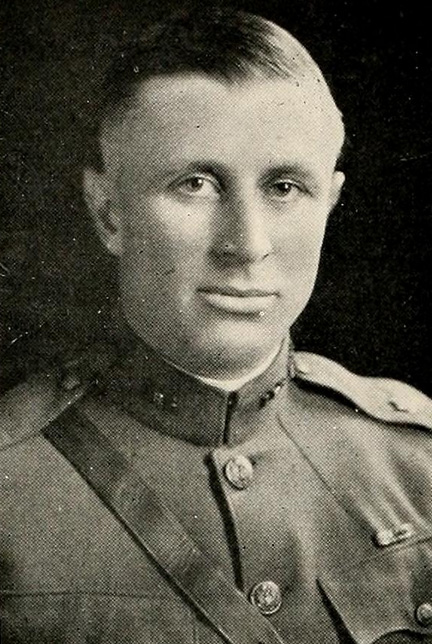
- Clarkson pictured in The Bomb 1922, VMI yearbook

Biographical details
- Born: March 15, 1890; Millboro, Virginia, U.S.
- Died: December 2, 1954 (aged 64); Lexington, Virginia, U.S.

Playing career
- 1912: VMI
- 1917: Camp Gordon
- Position: Tackle

Coaching career (HC unless noted)
- 1914–1916: Marion
- 1919: Marion
- 1920–1926: VMI

Administrative career (AD unless noted)
- 1920–1946: VMI

Head coaching record
- Overall: 44–21–2 (college)

Blandy Benjamin Clarkson (March 15, 1890 – December 2, 1954) was an American football coach and college athletics administrator. He was the 16th head football coach at the Virginia Military Institute (VMI) in Lexington, Virginia, serving for seven seasons from 1920 to 1926, and compiling a record of 44–21–2. Clarkson was also the longest-tenured athletic director in VMI history, having served from 1926 to 1946. Before his tenure at VMI, he served as head coach at the Marion Military Institute from 1914 to 1916 and again in 1919.

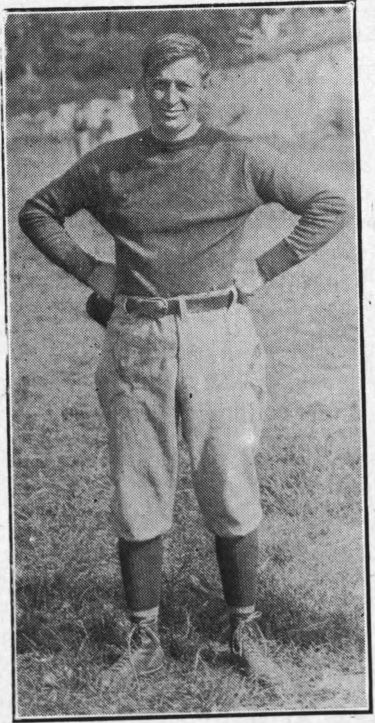
Clarkson in 1925

== Head coaching record ==
=== College ===
Year	Team	Overall	Conference	Standing	Bowl/playoffs
VMI Keydets (South Atlantic Intercollegiate Athletic Association) (1920–1921)
1920	VMI	9–0	5–0	1st	
1921	VMI	3–5–1	0–3–1	T–15th	
VMI:		12–5–1	5–3–1		
VMI Keydets (Independent) (1922–1923)
1922	VMI	7–2			
1923	VMI	9–1			
VMI:		16–3			
VMI Keydets (Southern Conference) (1924–1926)
1924	VMI	6–3–1	2–3–1	13th	
1925	VMI	5–5	1–5	17th	
1926	VMI	5–5	2–4	T–15th	
VMI:		16–13–1	5–12–1		
Total:		44–21–2			
