= VMI Keydets football =

Football program representing the Virginia Military Institute

2026 VMI Keydets football team
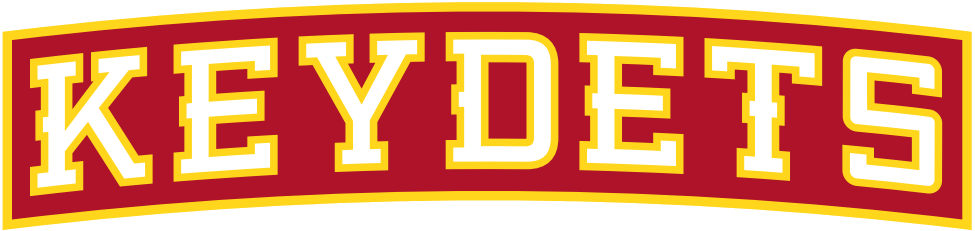
- First season: 1873; 153 years ago
- Athletic director: Jamaal Walton
- Head coach: Ashley Ingram; 1st season, 0–11 (.000)
- Location: Lexington, Virginia
- Stadium: Foster Stadium (capacity: 10,000)
- Field: Alumni Memorial Field
- NCAA division: Division I FCS
- Conference: Southern
- Colors: Red, white, and yellow
- All-time record: 498–768–42 (.397)
- Bowl record: 6–18 (.250)

Conference championships
- SoCon: 1951, 1957, 1959, 1960, 1962, 1974, 1977, 2020
- Rivalries: The Citadel (rivalry); Richmond (rivalry); Virginia Tech (rivalry; dormant); William & Mary (rivalry)

Uniforms
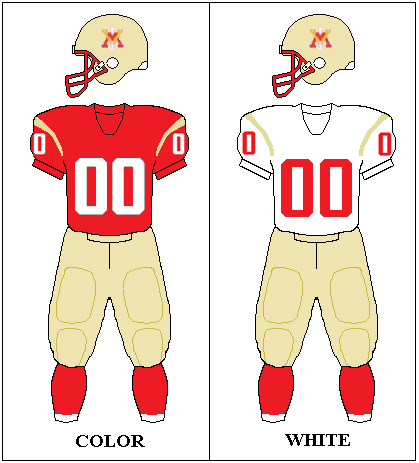
- Fight song: "The Spirit"
- Mascot: Moe the Kangaroo
- Website: vmikeydets.com

The VMI Keydets football team represents the Virginia Military Institute in Lexington, Virginia. The Keydets compete in the Southern Conference of the NCAA Division I FCS, and are coached by the new appointed head coach Ashley Ingram. VMI has played their home games at 10,000-seat Alumni Memorial Field since 1962.

Historically VMI's biggest rival was Virginia Tech. Today, VMI's biggest rival is The Citadel, as the two teams have battled 81 times, with The Citadel leading the series 46–33–2. The series was dubbed "The Military Classic of the South" in 1976 as a reference to the two school's status as the last two remaining all-military schools in the south, a region once rich with military colleges. The winner of each game receives an award known as the Silver Shako. The Silver Shako has been held by The Citadel since 2025. The last contest occurred on November 1, 2025.

In addition to The Citadel, VMI has minor rivalries with William & Mary and Richmond. The Tribe and the Keydets first met in 1908, and William & Mary leads that series 54–33–2. VMI's competition with Richmond goes back farther, to just their third year of existence (1893). Richmond has won 46 games to VMI's 40, and the teams have tied five times. Also, the Keydets have played Virginia and Virginia Tech 82 and 79 times, respectively.

== History ==
=== 19th century ===
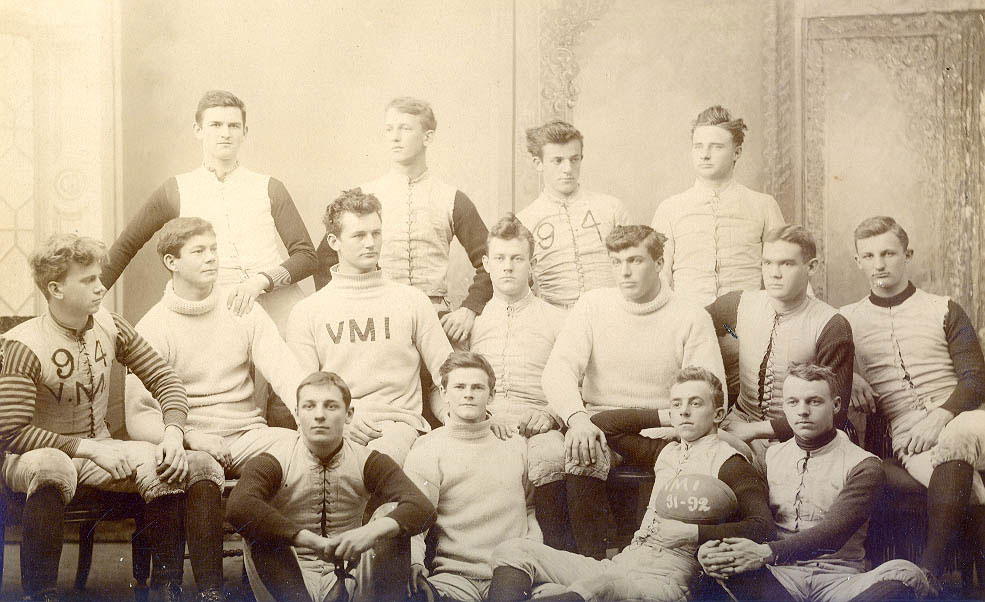
The first VMI football team in 1891

VMI football dates back to 1873 with a one-game season, featuring a 4–2 loss to Washington and Lee. No player or coaching records are known from that game. The Keydets would not have another intercollegiate team until 1891 under coach Walter Taylor III. Taylor was the son of Walter H. Taylor, a Civil War lieutenant colonel and aide to Robert E. Lee. The Keydets went 3–0–1 in 1891, with a win and tie against Washington and Lee and defeats of St. John's and Pantops Academy.

VMI had two additional undefeated seasons in 1892 and 1894, and a total record of 32–10–2 during the 19th century, setting the tone as being one of the state's top football schools. Although they were technically undefeated in 1899 by a virtue of a lone win over Washington & Lee, the season was cut short and all cadets were sent home due to an outbreak of typhoid fever.

=== 1900–1920 ===
VMI continued to have success on the field during the early 1900s. Sam Walker became the head coach at the turn of the century, and, after compiling a head coaching record of 11–7–3 in three seasons, was replaced by future College Football Hall of Famer William Roper. Roper's brief two-year tenure was highlighted by wins over NC State and Davidson.

After several seasons of mediocrity, VMI returned to their winning ways in 1911 under Alpha Brummage, who previously coached at now-NAIA Ottawa University in Ottawa, Kansas. In two years with Brummage, VMI went 14–2, and 7–1 each season, stumbling only to Virginia and St. John's, though VMI did manage to defeat and shutout the in-state rival and powerhouse Cavaliers 19–0 in 1912.

After Brummage left VMI for Kentucky, where he would become the school's football and basketball coach, the Keydets went 7–1–2 under new head coach Henry Poaque, his only season at the Institute. VMI joined the South Atlantic Intercollegiate Athletic Association (SAIAA) in 1918, many of the members of which formed the bulk of the Southern Conference after the conference's disbandment in 1921. In 1920, Blandy Clarkson led VMI to its third of only four perfect seasons with a 9–0 record, culminating with an SAIAA championship.

=== Alumni Field ===
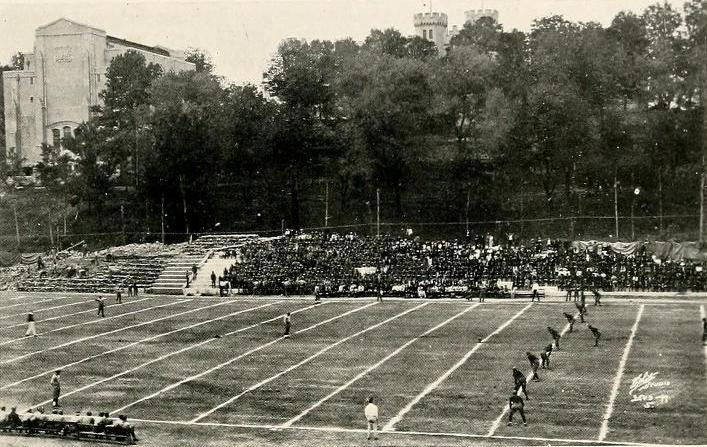
Old VMI stadium

With the finished construction of Alumni Field in 1921, VMI football no longer needed to play on the Parade Ground situated in front of the barracks. The stadium was placed around the same place it is today, and was completed at a total cost of $69,000. The Keydets went 3–5–1 in the stadium's inaugural year, which included key wins over in-state opponents Roanoke, Hampden–Sydney, and a stunning victory over Virginia.

=== Blandy Clarkson era ===
Following the perfect 9–0 championship season in 1920, VMI was much less successful the following year, posting a 3–5–1 record, which was the only losing season for the Keydets under Clarkson. After two stellar seasons of 7–2 and 9–1 as an independent, VMI joined the Southern Conference in 1924, where they would remain for nearly 80 years until 2003. In their inaugural SoCon season, VMI went 6–3–1, which was good for 13th place in a sizeable conference of 22. Clarkson departed VMI following the 1926 season, and totaled a record of 44–21–2 in seven years, the most wins by any Keydet head coach at the time.

=== William Raftery era ===
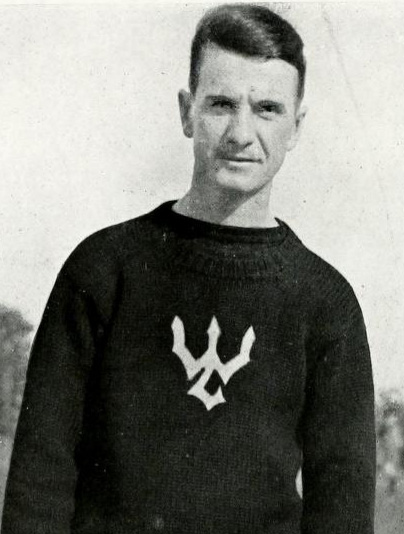
William Raftery

Following the departure of Clarkson, Worcester, Massachusetts-native William "Bill" Raftery took over head coaching duties of VMI. The Keydets were 6–4 his first season, ranking among the last in the SoCon. Raftery led the team to an 8–2 season in 1929, but it was the last winning season under Raftery's reign, which lasted until 1936. In ten years his record at VMI was 38–55–5.

=== Allison Hubert era ===
Allison Hubert took over for his predecessor Raftery in the 1937 season. Nicknamed "Pooley", Hubert was a Mississippi native and a veteran of World War I. After leading Alabama to the 1926 national championship, Hubert coached several sports at Southern Miss in the early 1930s. He went 5–5 in his first season with the Keydets. Hubert's most successful season with VMI was in 1940, where the squad finished 7–2–1, though it was only good enough to get them 7th in the conference. Hubert left with a 43–45–8 record under his belt after ten seasons.

=== Tom Nugent era ===
When Arthur Morton left VMI for Mississippi State in 1949, he was 9–8–1 with the Keydets. Tom Nugent took his place that January. Nugent was famous for developing the I formation, though it did not happen until the year after he left VMI. Though the first two years were nothing special, Nugent took the 1951 squad to their first SoCon championship with a 7–3 record. The season included a 34–0 shutout of Richmond, a 29–6 drubbing of Wofford, a 27–21 win over rival Citadel, and a 20–7 win over Virginia Tech in the season finale. Nugent left following the 1952 season.

=== Alumni Memorial Field and John McKenna era ===
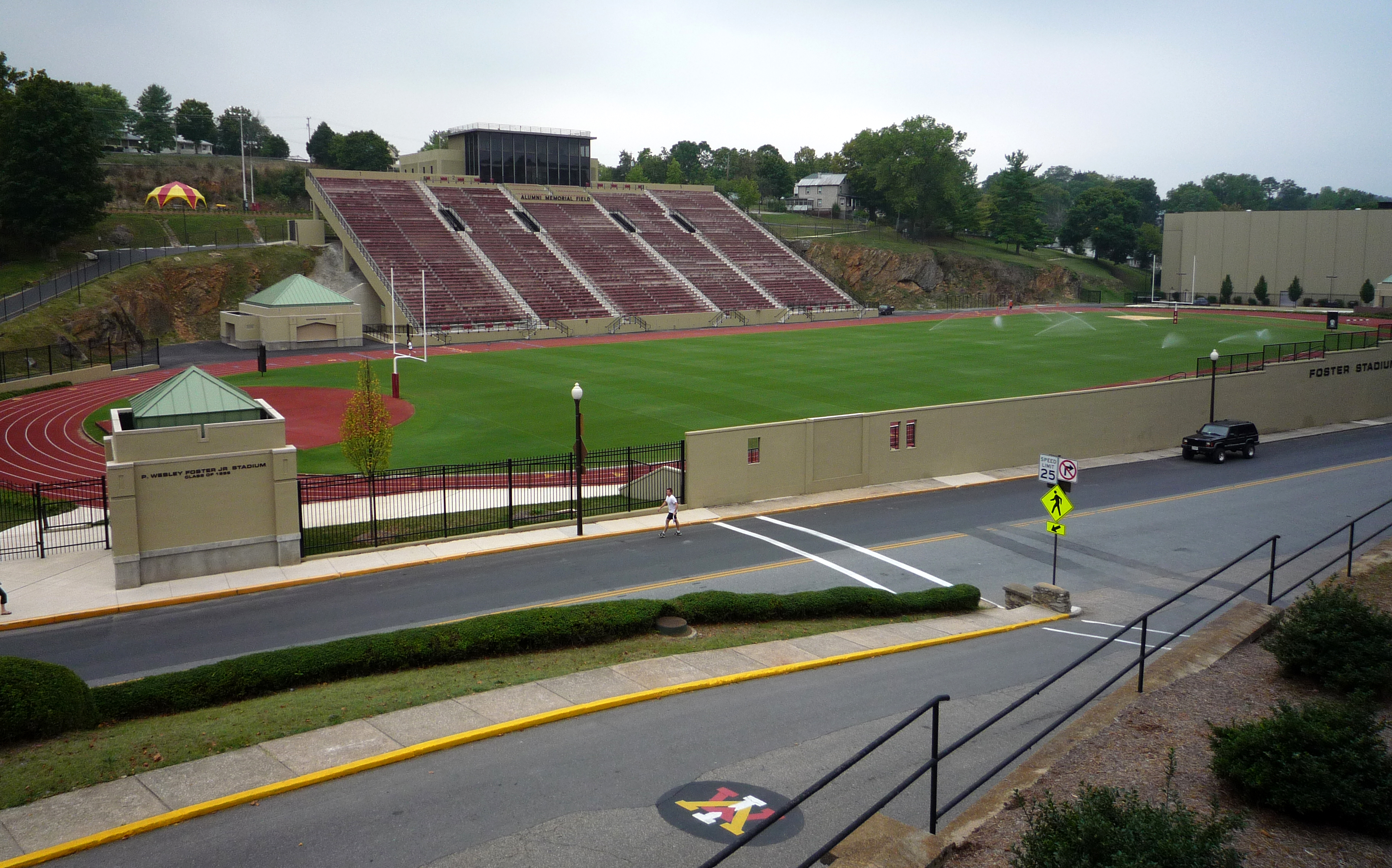
Alumni Memorial Field

Possibly the greatest decades in VMI football history were under John McKenna. In his thirteen years with the Keydets, McKenna had a record of 62–60–8, and won four SoCon championships. These occurred in 1957, 1959, 1960 and 1962.

In the same year VMI won the 1962 Southern Conference, 10,000-seat Alumni Memorial Field was built. Costs were around $250,000.

=== Bob Thalman era ===
Bob Thalman came to VMI in 1971. Coming from the University of Richmond, he previously coached at Hampden–Sydney. Thalman brought another two SoCon championships to VMI in 1974 and 1977. He departed in 1984 after a 1–9 season.

=== 1985–2002 ===
Eddie Williamson took over the head coaching position for four years, all losing seasons. He was followed by Jim Shuck, Bill Stewart, Ted Cain, and Cal McCombs until 2005. No coach could produce a winning season for the Keydets.

=== Big South and return to Southern Conference ===
In 2003, VMI joined the Big South Conference after 79 years in the SoCon. VMI still could not get back to its winning ways. They were under the direction of McCombs, who would be fired after 2005. Jim Reid would coach for two years, with a 3–19 record. Sparky Woods became the 30th head coach in 2008. The Keydets returned to the Southern Conference in 2014, but Woods was unable to lead a winning season; he was dismissed at the end of the 2014 season with a seven-year record of 17–62, and was replaced by Scott Wachenheim. The 2020 VMI Football team won the Southern Conference title with a 6-1 record, and a FCS Playoff berth. It is their first winning season since 1981.

During the 2021 FCS spring season, VMI defeated The Citadel 31–17 in the Military Classic of the South, retaining the Silver Shako, and winning their first Southern Conference football championship since 1977. By winning the SoCon championship, the Keydets became an automatic qualifier for their first ever FCS Playoff berth. The following week, on April 24, the Keydets lost by one touchdown to the No. 1 ranked James Madison, 31–24, in Harrisonburg, VA. Three members of the Spring 2021 Keydet football team would eventually be selected as first-team All-Americans. Scott Wachenheim, the head coach of the team, would go on to win multiple collegiate coaching honors for the season including Southern Conference Coach of the Year and AFCA-FCS Coach of the Year. Wachenheim had led the spring 2021 Keydets to their first conference championship in over 40 years and their first ever FCS playoff bid. During the season, VMI was ranked amongst the Top 25 FCS teams nationally for most of the season, rising as high as No. 10 in the FCS Stats Perform Poll and No. 11 in the AFCA Coaches Polls.

== Conference affiliations ==
- Independent (1891–1899)
- Virginia Intercollegiate Athletic Association (1900–1906)
- Independent (1907–1917)
- SAIAA (1918–1921)
- Southern (1924–2002)
- Big South (2003–2013)
- Southern (2014–present)

== Record vs. SoCon opponents ==
School	Series	First meeting	Last meeting
The Citadel	32–42–2	1920	2021
Chattanooga	8–16–1	1971	2019
East Tennessee State	10–15–0	1979	2021
Furman	10–28–0	1946	2021
Mercer	2–5–0	2014	2021
Samford	2–6–0	2001	2021
Western Carolina	4–24–0	1978	2021
Wofford	11–13–0	1924	2021

== Championships ==
=== Bowl games ===
The Keydets have six wins and 18 losses in 24 minor bowl games. This includes nine Tobacco Bowls and 15 Oyster Bowls.

Year	Bowl Game	Opponent	Result	Reference
1949	Tobacco Bowl	Richmond	W 14–7	
1952	Tobacco Bowl	Virginia	L 33–14	
1963	Oyster Bowl	Navy	L 21–12	
1964	Tobacco Bowl	Virginia	L 20–19	
1967	Tobacco Bowl	William & Mary	L 33–28	
1969	Tobacco Bowl	Virginia	L 28–10	
1974	Tobacco Bowl	Virginia Tech	W 22–17	
1975	Tobacco Bowl	Richmond	L 24–19	
1976	Tobacco Bowl	Virginia Tech	L 37–7	
1976	Oyster Bowl	Virginia	W 13–7	
1978	Tobacco Bowl	Richmond	W 23–6	
1980	Oyster Bowl	Virginia Tech	L 21–6	
1981	Oyster Bowl	The Citadel	W 14–0	
1982	Tobacco Bowl	Richmond	W 14–0	
1982	Oyster Bowl	Virginia Tech	L 14–3	
1984	Oyster Bowl	Virginia Tech	L 54–7	
1987	Oyster Bowl	William & Mary	L 17–6	
1988	Oyster Bowl	The Citadel	L 31–20	
1990	Oyster Bowl	William & Mary	L 59–47	
1991	Oyster Bowl	The Citadel	L 14–17	
1992	Oyster Bowl	Richmond	L 41–18	
1993	Oyster Bowl	William & Mary	L 49–6	
1994	Oyster Bowl	The Citadel	L 58–14	
1995	Oyster Bowl	Georgia Southern	L 31–13	

=== Undefeated seasons ===
Year	Record	Coach
1894	6–0	None
1899	1–0	Samuel Boyle, Jr.
1920	9–0	Blandy Clarkson
1957	9–0–1	John McKenna

=== Conference championships ===
The Keydets have won eight conference championships, with all of them coming in the Southern Conference, six outright and two shared.

Season	Conference	Coach	Overall record	Conference record
1951†	Southern Conference	Tom Nugent	7–3	5–0
1957	Southern Conference	John McKenna	9–0–1	6–0
1959	Southern Conference	John McKenna	8–1–1	5–0–1
1960	Southern Conference	John McKenna	7–2–1	4–1
1962	Southern Conference	John McKenna	6–4	6–0
1974	Southern Conference	Bob Thalman	7–4	5–1
1977†	Southern Conference	Bob Thalman	7–4	4–1
2020	Southern Conference	Scott Wachenheim	6–2	6–1

† Co-champions

== Postseason results ==
VMI has made one appearance in the NCAA Division I Football Championship playoffs, 2020. The Keydets' playoff record is 0–1.

Year	Round	Opponent	Result
2020	First Round	James Madison	L 24–31
Playoff record		0–1	

== Head coaches ==
VMI has had 32 head coaches in their history. They are currently led by Ashley Ingram, a graduate of North Alabama and a native of Georgia. The winningest coach in VMI history is John McKenna, who had a 62–60–8 in thirteen seasons at the school. Alpha Brummage, who led the Keydets for two seasons in 1911 and 1912, has the highest winning percentage among coaches with at least ten games coached (.875).

Name	Joined	Left
Walter Taylor	1891	1891
George Bryant	1895	1896
R. N. Groner	1897	1897
Sam Boyle	1898	1899
Sam Walker	1900	1902
William Roper	1903	1904
Ira Johnson	1905	1906
Charles Roller	1907	1908
William Gloth	1909	1910
Alpha Brummage	1911	1912
Henry Poaque	1913	1913
Frank Gorton	1914	1916
Earl Abell	1917	1917
Earl Abell & Mose Goodman	1918	1918
Red Fleming	1919	1919
Blandy Clarkson	1920	1926
W. C. Raftery	1927	1936
Allison Hubert	1937	1946
Arthur Morton	1947	1948
Tom Nugent	1949	1952
John McKenna	1953	1965
Vito Ragazzo	1966	1970
Bob Thalman	1971	1984
Eddie Williamson	1985	1988
Jim Shuck	1989	1993
Bill Stewart	1994	1996
Ted Cain	1997	1998
Donny White #	1998	1998
Cal McCombs	1999	2005
Jim Reid	2006	2007
Sparky Woods	2008	2014
Scott Wachenheim	2015	2022
Danny Rocco	2023	2025
Ashley Ingram	2026	–

Pound sign (#) denotes interim head coach
Note: From 1892–1894, the team had no coach

=== Current coaching staff ===
Name	Position
Ashley Ingram	Head coach
Bryan Stinespring	Associate head coach/offensive assistant
Bill Parker	Assistant head coach/cornerbacks/recruiting coordinator
Patrick Ashford	Off. coordinator/QBs
Nick Reveiz	Def. coordinator/linebackers
Jack Abercrombie	Offensive Line/run game coordinator
JB Lageman	Defensive line
Kendrick Scott	Running backs
Dino Waites	Safeties coach
Bilal Marshall	Wide receivers
Greg Wood	Specialists coach/video coordinator
Chris Moore	Special teams coordinator/tight ends
Ellis Spratlin	Director of strength and conditioning/football strength and conditioning

== Facilities ==
=== Alumni Memorial Field ===
Alumni Memorial Field at Foster Stadium, located on the VMI post, has been the home of VMI football games since 1962. Completed at a cost of around $250,000, Foster seats 10,000. The stadium went through a major $12 million renovation process in 2006, with new ticket booths, concourses, restrooms, and a new scoreboard and jumbotron. The field's surface is Bermuda Grass.

=== Sprinturf Field ===
Sprinturf Field serves as the Keydets practice facility, made of artificial grass. It also serves host to 1–2 lacrosse games throughout the season.

== Traditions ==
- Moe the Kangaroo

VMI chose a kangaroo to represent the school as a mascot in 1947, when two cheerleaders saw one on a magazine cover and thought how "uncommon the animal was as a mascot". Originally the kangaroo was named TD Bound, but later changed to Moe at an unknown time. VMI is one of four colleges with a marsupial mascot. Zippy of Akron and Kasey of UMKC are other schools with a kangaroo mascot.

- 12th Man

Around 20 minutes before VMI home games, the Corps of Cadets march from their barracks down to Foster Stadium while the regimental band plays. VMI uniquely requires every student to attend the football games from start to finish.

- Little John

A replica of a 1750 Howitzer cannon, "Little John" is a corps-owned cannon fired when the Keydets come on to the field, and after every VMI score and quarter end. The one currently in use was designed by Col. Cary S. Tucker. The previous one was retired to the VMI museum after the undefeated 1957 football team finished.

- Rat Push-Ups

After every point scored by The Keydets, the entire class of first-year Cadets (also known as Rats), runs down to the North end zone and does the same number of push-ups as the total number of points The Keydets have on the scoreboard.

== Rivalries ==
=== The Citadel ===
Arguably the school's biggest rival, The Citadel and VMI have played 81 times in a matchup known as the Military Classic of the South. The teams first met in 1920, where VMI cruised to a 35–0 shutout win in Lynchburg. The most recent meeting occurred in 2025, when Citadel prevailed 35-24, their third consecutive win in the Military Classic of the South. The Silver Shako (the trophy awarded to the winner) remains in the possession of The Citadel. Though the schools did not play in 2004 and from 2008 to 2010, the series has resumed as VMI would return to the Southern Conference in 2014. The Citadel has the edge in the rivalry, with 46 wins, 33 losses, and two ties as of 2025.

=== Virginia Tech ===
Virginia Tech and VMI first met in 1894 and played annually from 1913–71, usually in Roanoke on Thanksgiving Day. Like the current rivalry between VMI and The Citadel, the match-up was referred to as the Military Classic of the South, due to the military heritage of both schools. Starting again in 1973, the teams would continue to play on a yearly basis, making multiple appearances together in the Tobacco Bowl (1974, 1976) and Oyster Bowl (1980, 1982, 1984). The 1984 Oyster Bowl is the last time they played each other.

After the 1984 Oyster Bowl, Virginia Tech led the series 49–25–5. At 79 games, it is the second-longest series for the Hokies and fourth-longest for the Keydets. Due to the long pause of the VMI-VPI series, the Virginia–Virginia Tech rivalry has emerged as the dominant one in the state. However, in 2017, Virginia Tech and VMI agreed to a one-time rivalry matchup on September 5, 2026 at Lane Stadium.

== Notable players ==
Name	Team(s)	Played
Tim Maypray	Montreal Alouettes	2006–2009
Gregory Clifton	Washington Commanders (then Redskins)	1993
Thomas Haskins	Montreal Alouettes	1997–2002
Sam Horner	Redskins, New York Giants	1960–1962
Joe Muha	Philadelphia Eagles	1946–1950
Ray Reutt	Pittsburgh Steelers	1943
Mark Stock	Redskins, Steelers, Indianapolis Colts	1989, 1993, 1996
Bobby Thomason	Eagles, Los Angeles Rams, Green Bay Packers	1949–1957
Mike Wooten	Redskins	1987

== NCAA records ==
=== Team single game ===
- Most rushing attempts: 90 vs. East Tennessee State, 1990 (FCS record)
- Fewest passing yards allowed: -16 vs. Richmond, 1957 (FCS record)

=== Individual single season ===
- Most punts: 101, Jim Bailey, 1969 (FCS record)

== Future non-conference opponents ==
Announced schedules as of August 31, 2026.

2026	2027	2028	2029	2030	2031	2032	2033	2035	2036
at Idaho State	William & Mary	at Liberty	at Louisville	at William & Mary	at West Virginia	Richmond	at Richmond	at Richmond	at Georgetown
at Virginia Tech	at West Virginia	at Norfolk State	Davidson	Virginia–Wise	William & Mary	at Davidson		Georgetown	
Bucknell	at Bucknell			at Virginia	Davidson	at Virginia			
at Davidson									
