= Eddie Williamson =

American football player and coach (born 1951)

Biographical details
- Born: December 11, 1951 (age 74)

Playing career
- 1971–1973: Davidson

Coaching career (HC unless noted)
- 1974–1975: Furman (GA)
- 1977: Furman (OL)
- 1978–1982: Duke (OL)
- 1983: Baylor (OL)
- 1984: Georgia (OL)
- 1985–1988: VMI
- 1991–1992: Wake Forest (OC/OL)
- 1993–1997: North Carolina (AHC/OL)
- 1998: Baylor (OC/QB)
- 1999: Texas Southern (OC/QB)
- 2000: Wake Forest (OC/OL)
- 2001: TCU (OL)
- 2002–2013: TCU (AHC/OL)

Head coaching record
- Overall: 10–33–1

Eddie Williamson (born December 11, 1951) is a retired American football coach and former player. He was the 24th head football coach at the Virginia Military Institute (VMI) in Lexington, Virginia, serving for four seasons, from 1985 to 1988, and compiling a record of 10–33–1.

== Head coaching record ==
Year	Team	Overall	Conference	Standing	Bowl/playoffs
VMI Keydets (Southern Conference) (1985–1988)
1985	VMI	3–7–1	1–4–1	7th	
1986	VMI	1–10	1–5	7th	
1987	VMI	4–7	2–4	5th	
1988	VMI	2–9	1–5	6th	
VMI:		10–33–1	5–18–1		
Total:		10–33–1			
