= Red Fleming =

American football player and coach (1889–1933)

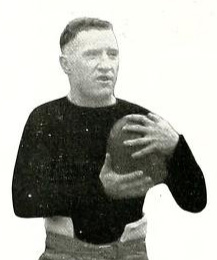

Biographical details
- Born: October 27, 1889; Bellwood, Pennsylvania, U.S.
- Died: December 18, 1933 (aged 44); Altoona, Pennsylvania, U.S.

Playing career
- 1912–1914: Washington & Jefferson
- Position: Halfback

Coaching career (HC unless noted)
- 1917: Quantico Marines
- 1919: VMI
- 1920: Washington & Jefferson (assistant)

Head coaching record
- Overall: 6–2 (college)

Malcolm David "Red" Fleming (October 27, 1889 – December 18, 1933) was an American college football player and coach. Fleming attended Washington & Jefferson College in Washington, Pennsylvania, where he played football as a halfback from 1912 to 1914 for head coach Bob Folwell. Fleming was the 15th head football coach at the Virginia Military Institute (VMI) in Lexington, Virginia, serving the 1919 season and compiling a record of 6–2.

Fleming served in the United States Marine Corps during World War I and coached the football team at Marine Corps Base Quantico in 1917. He returned to Washington & Jefferson in 1920 and spent one season as assistant coach under head football coach David C. Morrow. Fleming died of a heart attack on December 18, 1933, at his sister's home in Altoona, Pennsylvania.

== Head coaching record ==
=== College ===
Year	Team	Overall	Conference	Standing	Bowl/playoffs
VMI Keydets (South Atlantic Intercollegiate Athletic Association) (1919)
1919	VMI	6–2	4–2	T–5th	
VMI:		6–2	4–2		
Total:		6–2			
