= Henry Poague =

American football player and coach (1889–1953)

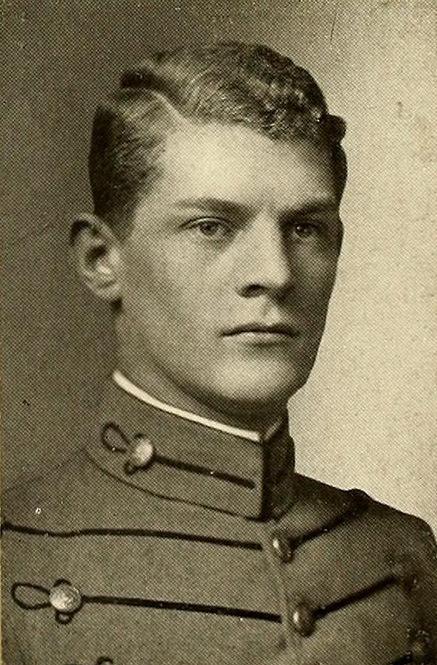
- Poague pictured in The Bomb 1910, VMI yearbook

Biographical details
- Born: May 24, 1889; Lexington, Virginia, U.S.
- Died: November 14, 1953 (aged 64); Dallas, Texas, U.S.

Playing career
- 1906–19010: VMI
- Position: Back

Coaching career (HC unless noted)
- 1911–1912: VMI
- 1913: VMI

Administrative career (AD unless noted)
- 1913–1914: VMI

Head coaching record
- Overall: 7–1–2

Henry Grigsley Poague (May 24, 1889 – November 14, 1953) was an American college football coach and athletics administrator. He was the 11th head football coach at the Virginia Military Institute (VMI) in Lexington, Virginia, serving for the 1913 season, and compiling a record of 7–1–2.

Poague played football at VMI as a back from 1906 in 1910. He was an assistant football coach at VMI for two seasons before he was promoted to head football coach and athletic director in 1913. Poague died on November 15, 1953, in Dallas. He was buried at Stonewall Jackson Memorial Cemetery in Lexington.

== Head coaching record ==
Year	Team	Overall	Conference	Standing	Bowl/playoffs
VMI Keydets (Independent) (1913)
1913	VMI	7–1–2			
VMI:		7–1–2			
Total:		7–1–2			
