= Jim Shuck =

American football player and coach (born 1954)

Biographical details
- Born: August 23, 1954 (age 72)

Playing career
- 1972–1975: Indiana
- Position: Guard

Coaching career (HC unless noted)
- 1981–1982: Indiana (assistant)
- 1983–1988: Army (assistant)
- 1989–1993: VMI

Head coaching record
- Overall: 14–40–1

Accomplishments and honors

Awards
- Second-team All-Big Ten (1975)

James L. Shuck (born August 23, 1954) is an American former football coach. He was the 25th head football coach at the Virginia Military Institute (VMI) in Lexington, Virginia, serving for five seasons, from 1989 to 1993, and compiling a record of 14–40–1.

== Head coaching record ==
Year	Team	Overall	Conference	Standing	Bowl/playoffs
VMI Keydets (Southern Conference) (1989–1993)
1989	VMI	2–8–1	1–4–1	T–6th	
1990	VMI	4–7	1–5	7th	
1991	VMI	4–7	2–5	T–6th	
1992	VMI	3–8	1–6	7th	
1993	VMI	1–10	1–7	9th	
VMI:		14–40–1	6–27–1		
Total:		14–40–1			
