= Walter Taylor (American football) =

American football player and coach (1872–1960)

Biographical details
- Born: July 5, 1872; Norfolk, Virginia, U.S.
- Died: August 1, 1960 (aged 88); Norfolk, Virginia, U.S.

Playing career
- 1891: VMI
- Position: Fullback

Coaching career (HC unless noted)
- 1891: VMI

Head coaching record
- Overall: 3–0–1

Walter Herron Taylor III (July 5, 1872 – August 1, 1960) was an American college football coach. He was the first head football coach at the Virginia Military Institute (VMI) in Lexington, Virginia, serving for the 1891 season and compiling a record of 3–0–1. Taylor was the son of banker, lawyer, soldier, politician, author, and railroad executive Walter H. Taylor, who was also an aide-de-camp to Robert E. Lee.

VMI did compete in one football game in 1873, but no records were kept on the coach. The one-game season was a loss to Washington and Lee.

== Head coaching record ==
Year	Team	Overall	Conference	Standing	Bowl/playoffs
VMI Keydets (Independent) (1891)
1891	VMI	3–0–1			
VMI:		3–0–1			
Total:		3–0–1			
