= George W. Bryant =

American sports coach, administrator, and professor (1873–1947)

Biographical details
- Born: June 9, 1873; Jersey City, New Jersey, U.S.
- Died: May 6, 1947 (aged 73); Cedar Rapids, Iowa, U.S.
- Education: Princeton University

Playing career

Football
- c. 1894: Coe

Baseball
- c. 1894: Coe
- Positions: End, halfback (football); Catcher (baseball)

Coaching career (HC unless noted)

Football
- 1895–1896: VMI
- 1899–1913: Coe

Basketball
- 1900–1911: Coe

Track
- ?–1930: Coe

Administrative career (AD unless noted)
- 1899–1914: Coe

Head coaching record
- Overall: 53–71–9 (football); 35–49 (basketball)

George W. Bryant (June 9, 1873 – May 6, 1947) was an American college sports coach, administrator, and professor. He served as head football coach at the Virginia Military Institute (VMI) in Lexington, Virginia from 1895 to 1896, and at Coe College in Cedar Rapids, Iowa from 1899 to 1913, compiling a career college football record of 53–70–9. Bryant died at the age of 73, on May 6, 1947, at a hospital in Cedar Rapids. At Coe College, Bryant was a team captain in football, baseball, tennis, and track and field.

== Head coaching record ==
Year	Team	Overall	Conference	Standing	Bowl/playoffs
VMI Keydets (Independent) (1895–1896)
1895	VMI	5–1			
1896	VMI	3–4			
VMI:		8–5			
Coe Warriors (Independent) (1899–1913)
1899	Coe	2–5			
1900	Coe	5–4			
1901	Coe	5–2–2			
1902	Coe	7–3			
1903	Coe	4–4			
1904	Coe	1–7			
1905	Coe	1–7–1			
1906	Coe	3–2–1			
1907	Coe	3–4			
1908	Coe	3–5			
1909	Coe	1–5–2			
1910	Coe	2–6			
1911	Coe	1–7			
1912	Coe	2–5			
1913	Coe	5–0–3			
Coe:		45–66–9			
Total:		53–71–9			
