= William C. Gloth =

American football player and coach (1886–1944)

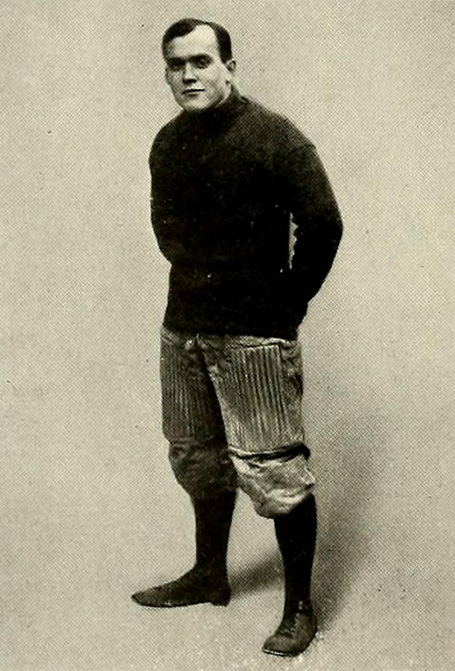
- Gloth pictured in The Bomb 1911, VMI yearbook

Biographical details
- Born: August 7, 1886; Erie, Pennsylvania, U.S.
- Died: December 3, 1944 (aged 58); Washington, D.C., U.S.

Playing career
- 1904–1908: Virginia
- Position: Center

Coaching career (HC unless noted)
- 1909–1910: VMI

Head coaching record
- Overall: 7–6–1

Accomplishments and honors

Awards
- All-Southern (1907)

William Conrad Gloth (August 7, 1886 – December 3, 1944) was an American football player and coach. Gloth was a center on Virginia Cavaliers football teams of the University of Virginia, noted for his ability to beat the ends downfield on a punt.

== Early life ==
William Conrad "Bily" Gloth was born on August 7, 1886, in Erie, Pennsylvania.

== Sports career ==
Gloth was selected for the All-Southern team of "a well-known New York authority on sports" in 1907. He played center on Virginia Cavaliers football at the University of Virginia. He was the ninth head football coach at the Virginia Military Institute (VMI) in Lexington, Virginia, serving for two seasons, from 1909 to 1910, and compiling a record of 7–6–1.

=== Head coaching record ===
Year	Team	Overall	Conference	Standing	Bowl/playoffs
VMI Keydets (Independent) (1909–1910)
1909	VMI	4–3			
1910	VMI	3–3–1			
VMI:		7–6–1			
Total:		7–6–1			

== Legal career ==
After leaving VMI, Gloth moved to Arlington County, Virginia. He was elected police court judge in 1916. In 1924, Gloth was elected commonwealth's attorney for Arlington County and he served in that role for years.

== Personal life ==
Gloth had one son, Ensign William Gloth Jr.

Gloth died on December 3, 1944, at Georgetown University Hospital in Washington, D.C. He was interred at Columbia Gardens Cemetery.
