= R. N. Groner =

American football coach

R.N. Groner
Biographical details
- Born: September 13, 1876
- Died: January 18, 1930 (aged 53)
- Education: University of Virginia

Coaching career (HC unless noted)
- 1897: VMI

Head coaching record
- Overall: 3–2

Robert Newell Groner (September 13, 1876 – January 18, 1930) was an American college football coach. He was the third head football coach at the Virginia Military Institute (VMI), serving for one season, in 1897, and compiling a record of 3–2.

== Head coaching record ==
Year	Team	Overall	Conference	Standing	Bowl/playoffs
VMI Keydets (Independent) (1897)
1897	VMI	3–2			
VMI:		3–2			
Total:		3–2			
