= Ashley Ingram =

American football coach (born 1973)

Current position
- Title: Head coach
- Team: VMI
- Conference: SoCon
- Record: 0–11

Biographical details
- Born: March 31, 1973 (age 53); Iron City, Georgia, U.S.
- Education: University of North Alabama (1996, 1997)

Playing career
- 1992–1996: North Alabama
- Position: Offensive lineman

Coaching career (HC unless noted)
- 1997: North Alabama (GA)
- 1998: Temple (GA)
- 1998: North Cobb HS (GA) (OL)
- 1999: West Alabama (OL)
- 2000–2005: Rhode Island (OL)
- 2006–2007: Bucknell (OC/OL)
- 2008–2022: Navy (OL)
- 2023: Navy (AHC/OL)
- 2024–2025: Carson–Newman
- 2026–present: VMI

Head coaching record
- Overall: 17–17
- Tournaments: 0–1 (NCAA D-II playoffs)

Accomplishments and honors

Championships
- 1 SAC Mountain Division (2024)

Ashley Ingram (born March 31, 1973) is an American college football coach. He is the head football coach for the Virginia Military Institute, a position he has held since 2026. He was the head football coach for Carson–Newman University from 2024 to 2025. He also coached for North Alabama, Temple, North Cobb High School, West Alabama, Rhode Island, Bucknell, and Navy. He played college football as an offensive lineman for North Alabama.

== Head coaching record ==
Year	Team	Overall	Conference	Standing	Bowl/playoffs
Carson–Newman Eagles (South Atlantic Conference) (2024–2025)
2024	Carson–Newman	9–3	7–1	1st (Mountain)	L NCAA Division II First Round
2025	Carson–Newman	8–3	6–3	T–3rd	
Carson–Newman:		17–6	12–4		
VMI Keydets (Southern Conference) (2026–present)
2026	VMI	0–11	0–7		
VMI:		0–11	0–7		
Total:		17–17			
