= Cal McCombs =

American football player and coach (born 1945)

Biographical details
- Born: August 4, 1945 (age 81)

Playing career
- 1965–1966: The Citadel
- Position: Defensive back

Coaching career (HC unless noted)

Football
- 1969–1970: South Carolina (GA)
- 1971–1972: The Citadel (Secondary)
- 1973–1975: The Citadel (WR)
- 1976: The Citadel (QB)
- 1977: The Citadel (RB)
- 1978–1980: The Citadel (DB)
- 1981–1982: The Citadel (DC)
- 1983: The Citadel (RB)
- 1984–1989: Air Force (DB)
- 1990–1998: Air Force (DC)
- 1999–2005: VMI

Track and field
- 1974–1975: The Citadel

Head coaching record
- Overall: 19–60 (football)

Cal McCombs (born August 4, 1945) is an American former college football player and coach. He was the 29th head football coach for the Virginia Military Institute (VMI) in Lexington, Virginia, serving for seven seasons, from 1999 to 2005, compiling a record of 19–60. He lives in Isle of Palms, South Carolina with his wife Lynne.

A native of Belton, South Carolina, McCombs is a 1967 graduate of The Citadel, where he earned five varsity letters in football and track. As a defensive back in football, he was an All-Southern Conference and All-State selection. McCombs was inducted into The Citadel Athletic Hall of Fame in 1988.

McCombs was the secondary coach at The Citadel from 1971 to 1983 under head coaches Red Parker, Bobby Ross, and Art Baker and also coached track for two years. He next served as secondary coach and defensive coordinator at the United States Air Force Academy before being named head football coach at VMI in 1998. He was a scout with the Denver Broncos for five years after leaving college coaching. In 2015, he served as a coach in the Medal of Honor Bowl played at The Citadels Johnson Hagood Stadium

== Head coaching record ==
=== Football ===
Year	Team	Overall	Conference	Standing	Bowl/playoffs
VMI Keydets (Southern Conference) (1999–2002)
1999	VMI	1–10	0–8	9th	
2000	VMI	2–9	1–7	T–8th	
2001	VMI	1–10	1–7	T—7th	
2002	VMI	6–6	3–5	T–5th	
VMI Keydets (Big South Conference) (2003–2005)
2003	VMI	6–6	2–2	3rd	
2004	VMI	0–11	0–4	5th	
2005	VMI	3–8	2–2	T–3rd	
VMI:		19–60	9–35		
Total:		19–60			
