= Bob Thalman =

American football player and coach (1922–2012)

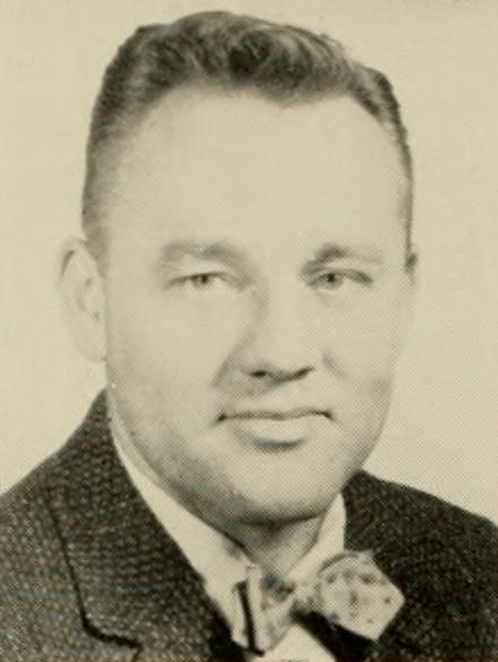
- Thalman pictured in Kaleidoscope 1960, Hampden-Sydney yearbook

Biographical details
- Born: November 5, 1922; Wheeling, West Virginia, U.S.
- Died: January 31, 2012 (aged 89); Atlanta, Georgia, U.S.

Playing career

Football
- 1946: Richmond

Coaching career (HC unless noted)

Football
- ?–1952: Norview HS (VA) (line)
- 1953–1955: Hampden–Sydney (assistant)
- 1956–1959: Hampden–Sydney
- 1960–1966: North Carolina (assistant)
- 1967–1968: Georgia Tech (off. backs)
- 1969–1970: VMI (defensive assistant)
- 1971–1984: VMI

Track
- ?–1953: Norview HS (VA)
- 1953–?: Hampden–Sydney

Administrative career (AD unless noted)
- 1956–?: Hampden–Sydney

Head coaching record
- Overall: 80–103–4 (college football)

Accomplishments and honors

Championships
- Football; 1 Mason–Dixon (1957); 1 Virginia Little Eight (1957); 2 SoCon (1974, 1977)

Robert Joseph Thalman (November 5, 1922 – January 31, 2012) was an American football and track coach. He served as the head football coach at Hampden–Sydney College from 1956 to 1959 and at the Virginia Military Institute (VMI) from 1971 to 1984, compiling a career college football record of 80–103–4. He led the VMI Keydets to Southern Conference championships in 1974 and 1977. Thalman played football at the University of Richmond, from which he graduated in 1948.

Thalman was the line coach in football and head track coach at Norview High School in Norfolk, Virginia until he was hired, in 1953, to be an assistant football coach at head track coach at Hampden–Sydney.

== Head coaching record ==
=== College football ===
Year	Team	Overall	Conference	Standing	Bowl/playoffs
Hampden–Sydney Tigers (Mason–Dixon Conference) (1956–1959)
1956	Hampden–Sydney	7–2	3–1	2nd	
1957	Hampden–Sydney	8–1	4–0	1st	
1958	Hampden–Sydney	6–3	3–1	2nd	
1959	Hampden–Sydney	5–3–1	2–1–1	T–2nd	
Hampden–Sydney:		26–9–1	12–3–1		
VMI Keydets (Southern Conference) (1971–1984)
1971	VMI	1–10	1–4	6th	
1972	VMI	2–9	1–5	6th	
1973	VMI	3–8	2–4	6th	
1974	VMI	7–4	5–1	1st	
1975	VMI	3–8	2–4	T–6th	
1976	VMI	5–5	2–3	5th	
1977	VMI	7–4	4–1	T–1st	
1978	VMI	3–8	1–4	6th	
1979	VMI	6–4–1	4–1	2nd	
1980	VMI	3–7–1	1–4–1	6th	
1981	VMI	6–3–1	3–1–1	2nd	
1982	VMI	5–6	2–3	6th	
1983	VMI	2–9	1–5	6th	
1984	VMI	1–9	1–4	8th	
VMI:		54–94–3	30–44–2		
Total:		80–103–4			
National championship Conference title Conference division title or championship game berth
