= W. C. Raftery =

American sports coach (1887–1965)

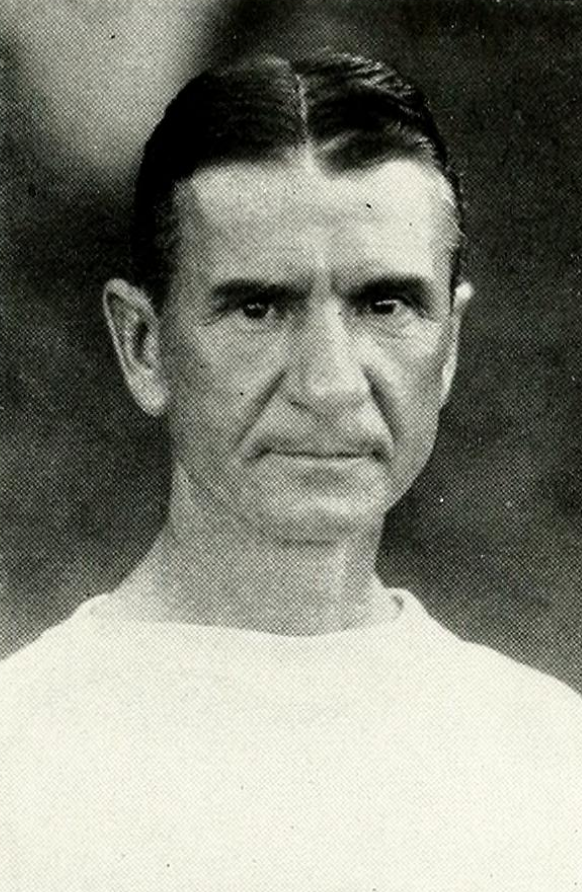
- Raftery pictured in Bomb 1937, Virginia Military Institute yearbook

Biographical details
- Born: July 28, 1887; Worcester, Massachusetts, U.S.
- Died: July 1, 1965 (aged 78); Ashland, Virginia, U.S.

Playing career

Football
- 1912–1913: Washington and Lee

Baseball
- c. 1912–1913: Washington and Lee
- Positions: Quarterback (football); Third baseman (baseball)

Coaching career (HC unless noted)

Football
- 1914–1916: Washington and Lee (assistant)
- 1917: Washington and Lee
- 1919–1921: Washington and Lee
- 1927–1936: VMI

Basketball
- 1913–1923: Washington and Lee
- 1913–1914: VMI
- 1922–1934: VMI

Baseball
- 1914: VMI

Head coaching record
- Overall: 62–55–5 (football); 68–112 (basketball)

Accomplishments and honors

Championships
- Football; 1 SAIAA (1921)

William Caulfield Raftery (July 28, 1887 – July 1, 1965) was an American football, basketball, and baseball coach. He was the 17th head football coach at Virginia Military Institute (VMI) located in Lexington, Virginia. He held that position for ten seasons, from 1927 until 1936. His career coaching record at VMI was 38–55–5. This ranks him fifth at VMI in total wins and 19th at VMI in winning percentage.

Raftery was born in Worcester, Massachusetts. He studied law at Washington and Lee University in Lexington, Virginia, where played college football as a quarterback in 1912 and 1913. He entered the pharmaceutical business in Ashland, Virginia in 1948, retiring in 1960. Raftery died on July 1, 1965, at his home in Ashland. He was buried in Lexington, Virginia.

== Head coaching record ==
=== Football ===
Year	Team	Overall	Conference	Standing	Bowl/playoffs
Washington and Lee Generals (South Atlantic Intercollegiate Athletic Association) (1917)
1917	Washington and Lee	4–3	2–1	2nd	
Washington and Lee Generals (South Atlantic Intercollegiate Athletic Association) (1919–1921)
1919	Washington and Lee	8–1	2–1	5th	
1920	Washington and Lee	5–3	3–0	3rd	
1921	Washington and Lee	6–3	2–0	1st	
Washington and Lee:		24–10	11–4		
VMI Keydets (Southern Conference) (1927–1936)
1927	VMI	6–4	2–4	16th	
1928	VMI	5–3–2	2–3–1	15th	
1929	VMI	8–2	4–2	7th	
1930	VMI	3–6	0–5	23rd	
1931	VMI	3–6–1	2–4	17th	
1932	VMI	2–8	1–4	18th	
1933	VMI	2–7–1	2–1–1	4th	
1934	VMI	1–8	0–5	10th	
1935	VMI	2–7–1	0–3–1	10th	
1936	VMI	6–4	5–2	4th	
VMI:		38–55–5	18–33–3		
Total:		62–55–5			
National championship Conference title Conference division title or championship game berth

=== Basketball ===
Record table
Season	Team	Overall	Conference	Standing	Postseason
VMI Keydets (Independent) (1913–1914, 1922–1925)
1913–14	VMI	6–6			
1922–23	VMI	8–6			
1923–24	VMI	9–5			
1924–25	VMI	6–5			
VMI Keydets (Southern Conference) (1925–1934)
1925–26	VMI	7–8	3–5	13th	
1926–27	VMI	3–12	0–7	21st	
1927–28	VMI	7–6	5–5	13th	
1928–29	VMI	6–7	1–7	22nd	
1929–30	VMI	4–10	2–6	17th	
1930–31	VMI	4–12	2–8	20th	
1931–32	VMI	0–14	0–9	23rd	
1932–33	VMI	4–11	2–8	8th	
1933–34	VMI	4–10	3–6	7th	
VMI:		68–112	18–61		
Total:		68–112			
