= Sam Walker (American football) =

American football coach

Biographical details
- Education: University of Pennsylvania (1899)

Coaching career (HC unless noted)
- 1900–1902: VMI

Head coaching record
- Overall: 11–7–3

Samuel Walker was an American college football coach. He was the fifth head football coach at the Virginia Military Institute (VMI), serving for three seasons, from 1900 to 1902, and compiling a record of 11–7–3.

== Head coaching record ==
Year	Team	Overall	Conference	Standing	Bowl/playoffs
VMI Keydets (Independent) (1900–1902)
1900	VMI	4–1–2			
1901	VMI	4–3			
1902	VMI	3–3–1			
VMI:		11–7–3			
Total:		11–7–3			
