= Frank Gorton =

American football, basketball, baseball, and track and field coach

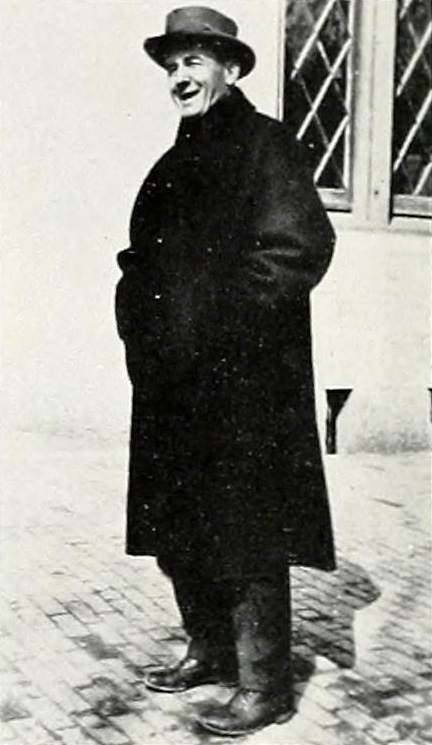
- Gorton pictured in The Bomb 1915, VMI yearbook

Biographical details
- Born: 1877
- Died: March 20, 1939 (aged 62); Lexington, Virginia, U.S.

Coaching career (HC unless noted)

Football
- 1906–1907: Rutgers
- 1908–1910: Occidental
- 1914–1916: VMI
- 1917: Otterbein
- 1918: Fisk
- 1925: Rochester (NY) (assistant)
- 1934: Rochester (NY) (assistant)

Basketball
- 1906–1908: Rutgers
- 1914–1917: VMI
- 1917–1918: Otterbein

Baseball
- 1907: Rutgers
- 1915–1917: VMI
- 1939: Ohio State (assistant trainer)

Track
- 1915–1917: VMI
- 1926–1937: Rochester

Administrative career (AD unless noted)
- 1914–1917: VMI
- 1926–1928: VMI (intramural director)

Head coaching record
- Overall: 38–29–6 (football); 34–30 (basketball)

Frank H. Gorton (1877 – March 20, 1939) was an American football, basketball, baseball, and track and field coach. He served as the head football coach at Rutgers University from 1906 to 1907, Occidental College from 1908 to 1910, the Virginia Military Institute (VMI) from 1914 to 1916, and Otterbein College—now known as Otterbein University—in 1917, compiling a career college football record of 38–29–6. Gorton was also the head basketball coach at Rutgers from 1906 to 1909, at VMI from 1914 to 1917, and at Otterbein College during the 1917–18 season, amassing a career college basketball mark of 33–31. In addition, he served as the head baseball coach at Rutgers in 1907. Gorton returned to VMI in 1926 to serve a physical instructor and the school's director of intramural sports.

Gorton died on March 20, 1939, at the age of 62, of a heart attack, in Lexington, Virginia.

== Head coaching record ==
=== Football ===
Year	Team	Overall	Conference	Standing	Bowl/playoffs
Rutgers Queensmen (Independent) (1906–1907)
1906	Rutgers	5–2–2			
1907	Rutgers	3–5–1			
Rutgers:		8–7–3			
Occidental Tigers (Independent) (1908–1910)
1908	Occidental	9–2			
1909	Occidental	4–1–1			
1910	Occidental	2–2–1			
Occidental:		15–5–2			
VMI Keydets (Independent) (1914–1916)
1914	VMI	4–4			
1915	VMI	6–2–1			
1916	VMI	4–5			
VMI:		14–11–1			
Otterbein Cardinals (Independent) (1917–singe)
1917	Otterbein	1–6			
Otterbein:		1–6			
Total:		38–29–6			

=== Basketball ===
Record table
Season	Team	Overall	Conference	Standing	Postseason
Rutgers Queensmen (Independent) (1906–1907)
1906–07	Rutgers	0–3			
1907–08	Rutgers	4–11			
Rutgers:		4–14			
VMI Keydets (Independent) (1914–1917)
1914–15	VMI	8–2			
1915–16	VMI	9–3			
1916–17	VMI	9–5			
VMI:		26–10			
Otterbein Cardinals (Independent) (1917–1918)
1917–18	Otterbein	4–6			
Otterbein:		4–6			
Total:		34–30			
