= Charles Roller =

American football player and coach (1879–1963)

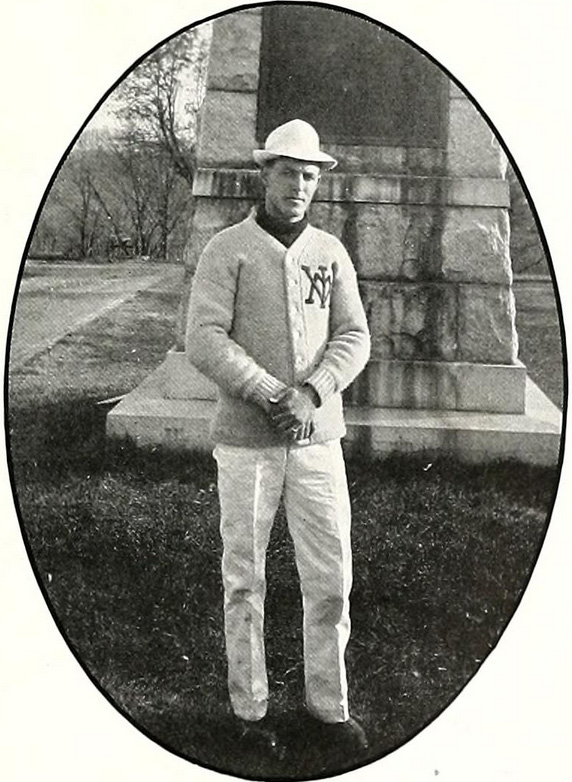
- Roller pictured in The Bomb 1908, VMI yearbook

Biographical details
- Born: September 8, 1879; Augusta County, Virginia, U.S.
- Died: March 16, 1963 (aged 83); Fort Defiance, Virginia, U.S.

Playing career
- 1900: VMI
- Position: Quarterback

Coaching career (HC unless noted)
- 1901–1902: Furman
- 1907–1908: VMI
- 1908: Washington and Lee (assistant)

Head coaching record
- Overall: 14–10–5

Charles Summerville Roller Jr. (September 8, 1879 – March 16, 1963) was an American college football player and coach. He served as the head football coach at Furman University from 1901 to 1902 and at the Virginia Military Institute (VMI) from 1907 to 1908, compiling a career coaching record of 14–10–5. Roller led the 1902 Furman Baptists football team to wins over North Carolina A&M and South Carolina. From 1903 until 1913 Furman did not field a football team.

Roller played at VMI, where he was an All-Southern quarterback. He worked as an assistant football coach at Washington and Lee University in 1908.

Roller attended the Augusta Military Academy in Fort Defiance, Virginia, where his father, Charles Summerville Roller, was a founder of the school and commandant. The younger Roller served as commandant and principal of that school later in his life. During World War I, he served as a major with the Red Cross in Europe. Roller died in Fort Defiance on March 16, 1963.

== Head coaching record ==
Year	Team	Overall	Conference	Standing	Bowl/playoffs
Furman Baptists (Southern Intercollegiate Athletic Association) (1901–1902)
1901	Furman	1–2–1			
1902	Furman	4–3–4	1–2–1	11th	
Furman:		5–5–5			
VMI Keydets (Independent) (1907–1908)
1907	VMI	5–3			
1908	VMI	4–2			
VMI:		9–5			
Total:		14–10–5			
