= Arthur Morton (American football) =

American football player and coach (1914–1999)

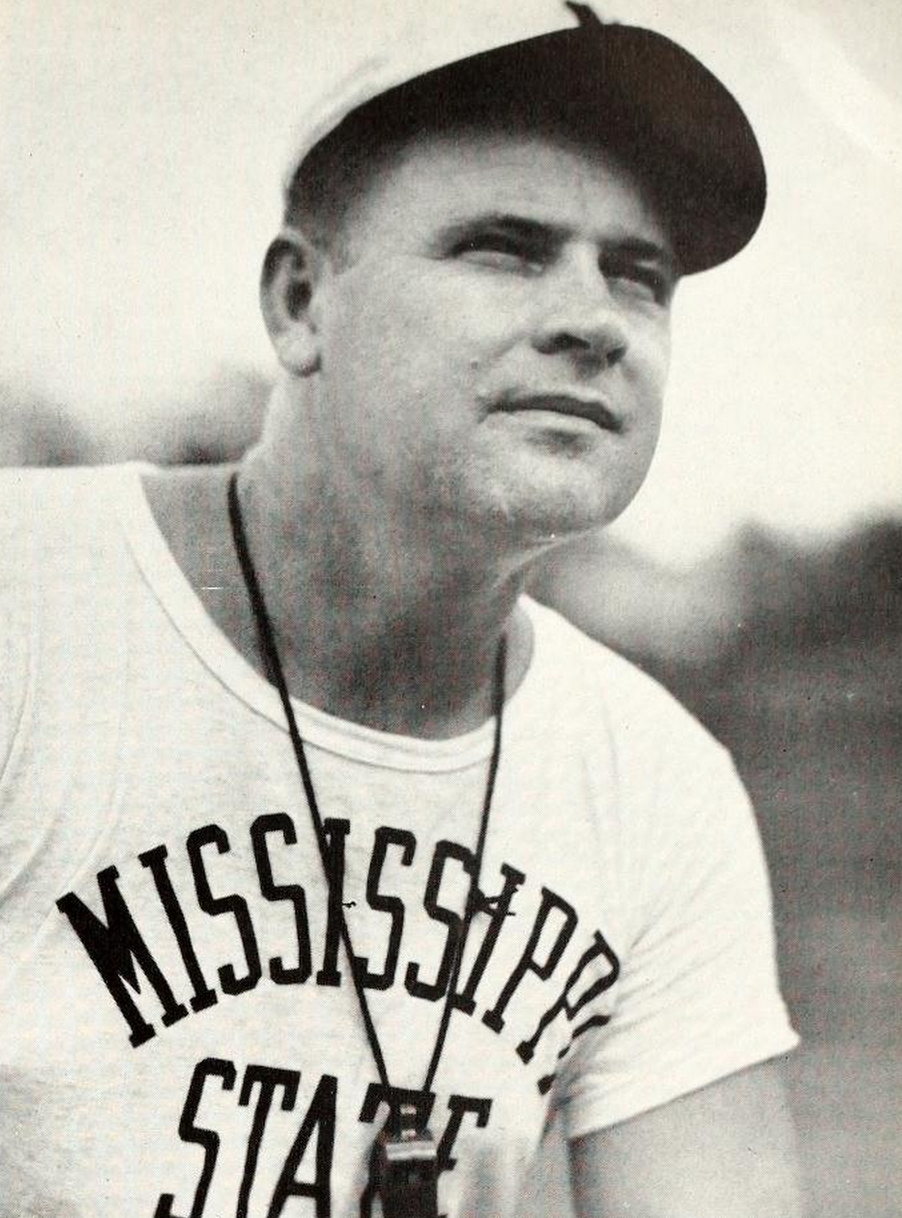
- Morton pictured in Reveille 1950, Mississippi State yearbook

Biographical details
- Born: June 12, 1914; Gilliam, Louisiana, U.S.
- Died: April 19, 1999 (aged 84); Jackson, Mississippi, U.S.

Playing career
- 1935–1937: LSU
- Position: Halfback

Coaching career (HC unless noted)
- 1938: Saint Stanislaus (MS)
- 1939–1941: Bogalusa HS (LA)
- 1942: Southeastern Louisiana
- 1943–1946: LSU (backfield/ends)
- 1947–1948: VMI
- 1949–1951: Mississippi State

Head coaching record
- Overall: 22–31–2 (college)

Arthur Wilson "Slick" Morton Jr. (June 12, 1914 – April 19, 1999) was an American football player and coach. He was the head football coach at Southeastern Louisiana University (1942), the Virginia Military Institute (1947–1948), and Mississippi State University (1949–1951), compiling a career college football record of 22–31–2.

== Playing career ==
Morton led Tallulah High School to back-to-back Louisiana state football championships in 1932 and 1933. Morton was personally recruited by Huey Long to attend Louisiana State University (LSU), where he lettered for the LSU Tigers football team from 1935 through 1937 and was captain of the 1937 squad.

== Coaching career ==
=== High school ===
Morton began his coaching career in 1938 at Saint Stanislaus College, a Catholic prep school in Bay St. Louis, Mississippi. There he mentored Doc Blanchard, who went on to win the Heisman Trophy in 1945 playing for Army. In 1939, Morton move to Bogalusa High School in Bogalusa, Louisiana, where he served as head football coach for three seasons.

=== Southeastern Louisiana ===
Morton's first head coaching position was the fifth head coach at Southeastern Louisiana University and he held that position for the 1942 season. His coaching record at Southeastern Louisiana was 5–5 .

=== VMI ===
Morton was named the 19th head coach for the Keydets and he held that position for two seasons, from 1947 until 1948. His career coaching record at VMI was 9–8–1.

== Later life ==
After his coaching days, Morton moved to Greenwood, Mississippi, entering business as a general contractor.

== Head coaching record ==
=== College ===
Year	Team	Overall	Conference	Standing	Bowl/playoffs
Southeastern Louisiana Lions (Louisiana Intercollegiate Conference) (1942)
1942	Southeastern Louisiana	5–5	0–3	4th	
Southeastern Louisiana:		5–5	0–3		
VMI Keydets (Southern Conference) (1947–1948)
1947	VMI	3–5–1	2–3–1	11th	
1948	VMI	6–3	5–1	3rd	
VMI:		9–8–1	7–4–1		
Mississippi State Maroons (Southeastern Conference) (1949–1951)
1949	Mississippi State	0–8–1	0–6	12th	
1950	Mississippi State	4–5	3–4	7th	
1951	Mississippi State	4–5	2–5	11th	
Mississippi State:		8–18–1	5–15		
Total:		22–31–2			
