= Mose Goodman =

American football player and coach

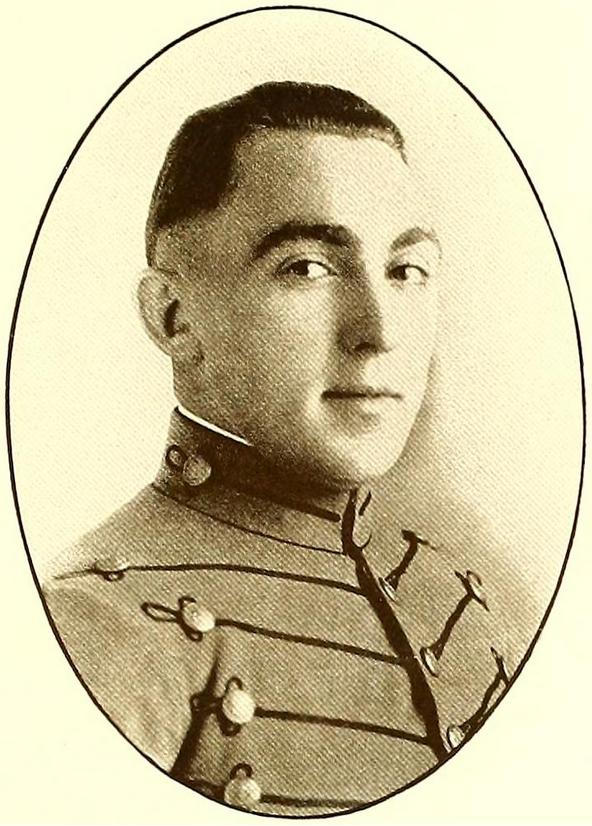
- Goodman pictured in The Bomb 1917, VMI yearbook

Biographical details
- Born: c. 1895; Norfolk, Virginia, U.S.

Playing career
- ?: VMI
- Position: End

Coaching career (HC unless noted)
- 1918: VMI

Head coaching record
- Overall: 1–3

Benjamin A. "Mose" Goodman (born c. 1895) was an American football coach. He was the 14th head football coach at the Virginia Military Institute in Lexington, Virginia, serving for the 1918 season and compiling a record of 1–3. He later worked as a grocer in Pensacola, Florida.
