= 1896 Georgia Tech football team =

American college football season

1896 Georgia Tech football
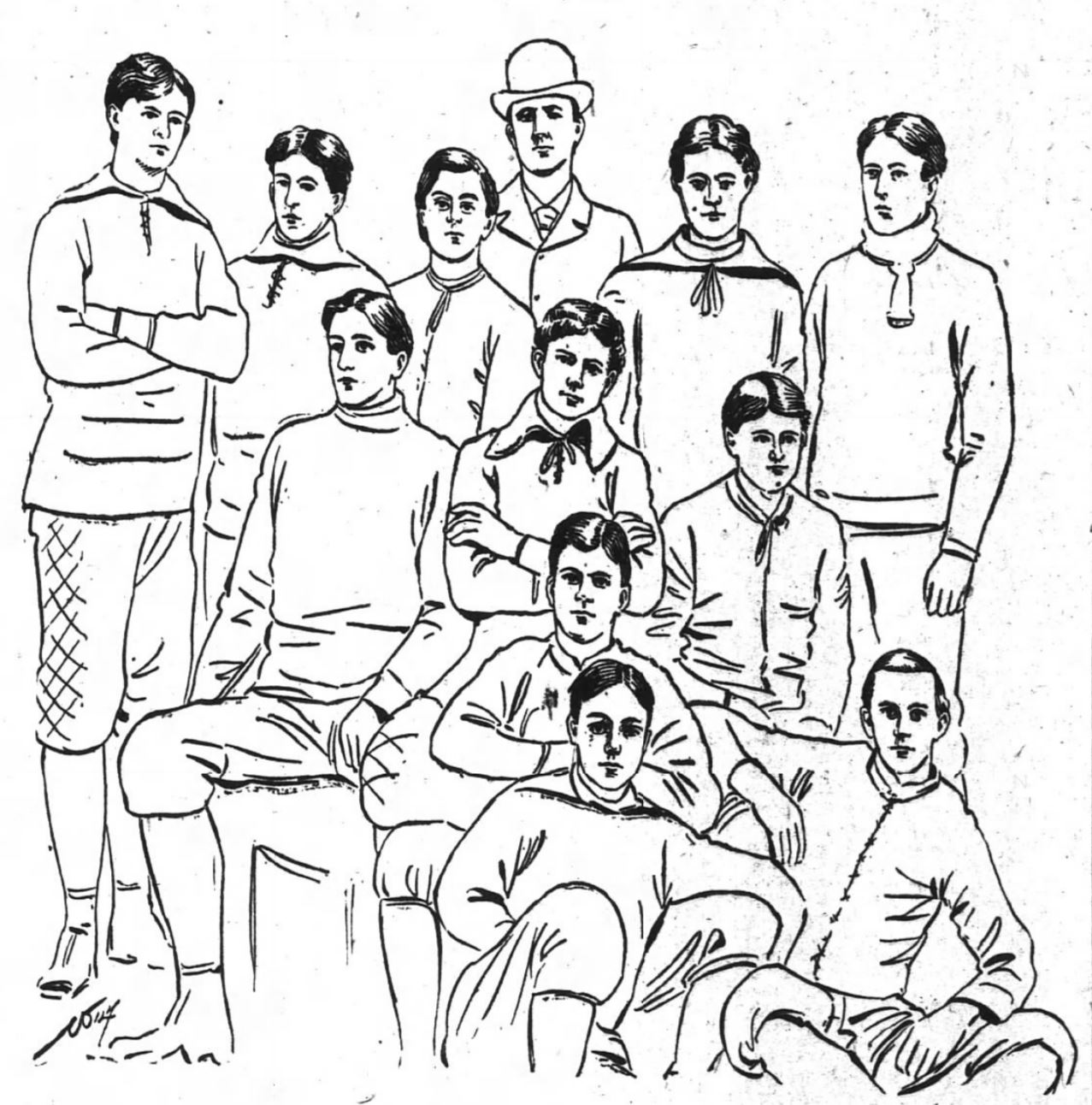
- Conference: Independent
- Record: 2–2–1
- Head coach: J. B. Wood (1st season)
- Captain: Wight
- Home stadium: Brisbine Park

1896 Southern college football independents records
	Conf.			Overall
Team	W	L	T	W		L		T
Centre		–		6	–	0	–	1
Texas A&M		–		2	–	0	–	1
Oklahoma		–		2	–	0	–	0
North Carolina A&M		–		1	–	0	–	0
Virginia		–		7	–	2	–	2
VPI		–		5	–	2	–	1
Navy		–		5	–	3	–	0
Arkansas		–		2	–	1	–	0
Clemson		–		2	–	1	–	0
Columbian		–		2	–	1	–	0
Georgia Tech		–		2	–	2	–	1
Add-Ran		–		1	–	1	–	1
Centenary		–		1	–	1	–	0
VMI		–		3	–	4	–	0
North Carolina		–		3	–	4	–	1
Furman		–		2	–	3	–	0
Ole Miss		–		1	–	2	–	0
West Virginia		–		3	–	7	–	2
South Carolina		–		1	–	3	–	0
Erskine		–		0	–	1	–	0
William & Mary		–		0	–	2	–	0
Davidson		–		0	–	1	–	0
Delaware		–		0	–	6	–	0

The 1896 Georgia Tech football team represented the Georgia School of Technology during the 1896 college football season. After not fielding a team during the previous year, 1896 featured Georgia Tech's fourth season of football. The team was nicknamed the Techs.

Over the summer, newly elected Georgia Tech President Lyman Hall developed plans to pay more attention to athletes than the school had done previously. He initiated the hiring of new professors including one specifically to be placed in charge of training the football and baseball teams. More attention was to be paid to athletes over the next season than ever before, which included the overhaul of the school's gymnasium. J. B. Wood, a formal football captain at Central University, was selected for the role and arrived on campus on September 15. He would serve as Georgia Tech's coach for the next two years. The fervor led to high expectations for the upcoming season and many students arrived at school early to begin training.

The team was made up of only underclassmen and there were early concerns about their lack of experience. Frank Ogletree, the fullback, and West, the Center, were the only returnees from the 1894 season and Ogletree rarely took the field. Wright, the Quarterback, was named captain. Coach Wood said of the team: "Although the team is rather lightweight, averaging about 155 pounds, and is made up almost entirely of raw material, I fee confident that they will make a creditable showing on the gridiron. The men put up a game always snappy and clever, and should, I think, win at least a majority of the games played this season."

Georgia Tech used the colors of old gold and white, and its fans shouted the following cheer:

  Teckity–Teck Hoo-reck!  Hoo-reck!
  Tecikty-Teck Hoo-reck!  Hoo reck!
  Boom–rah!  Boom–rah!  GEORGIA!

With a 2-2-1 record, the season was a competent return to football for Georgia Tech. While Tech performed adequately against its lesser opponents, its easy defeat by Auburn showed that it was not ready to play against the power football schools of the south. Unfortunately, the season did not give Georgia Tech any momentum in its football program as the team would not win another game until the 1901 season.

== Schedule ==
Date	Time	Opponent	Site	Result	Attendance	Source
October 31		at Mercer	Central City Park; Macon, GA	W 6–4	400	
November 7		at Auburn	Drill Field; Auburn, AL (rivalry)	L 0-40		
November 14	3:00 p.m.	Fort McPherson (Note: This game has been erroneously left out of the Georgia Tech information guide.)	Brisbine Park; Atlanta, GA	W 10-4		
November 21	3:00 p.m.	Mercer	Brisbine Park; Atlanta, GA	T 12-12		
November 26	11:00 a.m.	Fort McPherson (Note: This game has been erroneously left out of the Georgia Tech information guide.)	Piedmont Park; Atlanta, GA	L 0-10		

Georgia Tech made plans for several other games for the season including a match against Fort McPherson on October 24, Virginia Tech on November 17, and games against Furman and Wofford on Thanksgiving, and possible games against Auburn and Georgia.

== Game summaries ==
Georgia Tech Techs (0–0–0) at Mercer Baptists (0–1–0)

Quarter	1	2	Total
Georgia Tech	0	6	6
Mercer	4	0	4

at Central City Park • Macon, Georgia

- Date: Saturday, October 31, 1896
- Game time: Unknown
- Game attendance: 400
- Referee: Small

Georgia Tech's first game of the season marked its return to the field after not fielding a team the previous year. For the majority of the Tech team, this was the first game of their careers. Mercer had lost its first game of the season to Auburn 0-46. The Georgia Tech's coach, J. B. Wood, umpired the game, which caused claims of unfairness from Mercer. The all-time series between the schools was tied 1-1-0 with their last match-up in 1894.

The game was described as the "prettiest game seen on the Macon gridiron in years". Mercer got off to a very fast start and scored a goal within the first five minutes. However, Mercer missed the kick the extra points which would prove costly. Mercer continued to have the upper hand and took the ball within six inches of the Tech goal, but a costly fumble stopped the attack. Eventually, Georgia Tech was able to school a touchdown of their own and its successful extra points would decide the game 6-4. Mercer claimed that the score should have been 4-4 and that the umpire--who was Georgia Tech's coach--was unfair in declaring Tech's try for extra points as successful. However, the person who made the call on the field was Mercer's referee.

While the teams were evenly match, their lack of size would be concerning against future opponents. Tech returned to Atlanta the next morning. The two teams would face off again the next month.

Georgia Tech Techs (1–0–0) at Auburn Tigers (1–0–0)

Quarter	1	2	Total
Georgia Tech	0	0	0
Auburn (Note: Scoring for each half is not known.)	40	0	40

at Drill Field • Auburn, Alabama

- Date: Saturday, November 7, 1896
- Game time: Unknown
- Game attendance: Unknown
- Referee: J. B. Wood

Georgia Tech's second match-up against Auburn at Auburn, Alabama, was the first time that Tech traveled outside of the state of Georgia to play a football game. Both teams had only played one earlier game in the season, each winning against Mercer. While Georgia Tech won a close contest on a controversial extra point attempt, Auburn had easily beaten Mercer 46-0 in only a forty-minute match. Auburn led the all-time series against Tech 2-0-0, with the last game being a 94-0 shutout in 1894.

Auburn quickly showed that they outmatched the Techs, scoring a touchdown in the first minute of the game. Auburn scored a total of seven touchdowns during the game. Georgia Tech had trouble moving the ball against Auburn and only came within ten yards of a touchdown one time. Frazer, Tech's fullback, led the Tech team with some great tackles. Auburn won the game 40-0.

Fort McPherson Soldiers (0–0–0) at Georgia Tech Techs (1–1–0)

Quarter	1	2	Total
Fort McPherson	4	0	4
Georgia Tech (Note: Scoring for each half is not known.)	10	0	10

at Brisbine Park • Atlanta, Georgia

- Date: Saturday, November 14, 1896
- Game time: 3:00 p.m.
- Game attendance: Unknown
- Referee: Cannon

Georgia Tech next played the officers from Fort McPherson in a rematch of their 1894 defeat. It was Fort McPherson's first game of the season. The game was well played and hotly contested from the beginning. Georgia Tech scored touchdowns from Crawford and Frazer and won the game 10–4.

Mercer Baptists (0–2–0) at Georgia Tech Techs (2–1–0)

Quarter	1	2	Total
Mercer	4	8	12
Georgia Tech	6	6	12

at Brisbine Park • Atlanta, Georgia

- Date: Saturday, November 21, 1896
- Game time: 3:00 p.m.
- Game attendance: "A small crowd"
- Referee: R. T. Dorsey, Jr.

The Georgia Tech-Mercer rematch was an anticipated event in Atlanta due to the rivalry between the schools and the controversial result of the first game. Both teams were said to have trained very hard in preparation for the match, and Mercer had brought in some new players since the first game. As it turned out, only a small crowd came to the game, but they brought self-made instruments that "made the air hideous with unearthly noises".

Georgia Tech won the toss and deferred to Mercer who promptly fumbled the ball on its first play from scrimmage. Tech was able to score a few players later by Freyer's run through the right tackle and guard. The teams played back and forth in the drives that followed. Eventually, Georgia Tech was making very good progress and came within feet of the Mercer goal. Spectacularly, the Mercer halfback, Glass, pulled the ball out of Ogletree's hands and ran the length of the field for a touchdown. Ogletree claimed that he was called down before the ball was taken, but the umpire did not change the call. Mercer missed the extra points try. For the rest of the half, the Techs played well and Ogletree was said to have played "like a demon"; however, no more scores were made.

In the second half, Mercer's trainer, Bobbie Winston, was able to institute adjustments in Mercer's play. Mercer was able to steadily move the ball at the beginning of the half and Glass scored another touchdown after a few minutes. Mercer once again missed the kick after. For most of the rest of the half, the ball was exchanged between the teams, but Georgia Tech's Freyer was able to score his team's second touchdown. In the last drive of the game, Mercer moved the ball with steady gains, securing a touchdown by Glass. However, the kick after was missed in the dark. The second half was called after twenty-four minutes due to darkness, ending the game in a 12-12 tie, the first tie in Georgia Tech's history. While Mercer had more touchdowns than Tech (2 to 1), Mercer missed all three of its tries for extra points.

Fort McPherson Soldiers (0–1–0) at Georgia Tech Techs (2–1–0)

Quarter	1	2	Total
Fort McPherson (Note: Scoring for each half is not known.)	10	0	10
Georgia Tech	0	0	0

at Piedmont Park • Atlanta, Georgia

- Date: Saturday, November 26, 1896
- Game time: 11:00 a.m.
- Game attendance: Unknown
- Referee: Unknown

Georgia Tech was slated to play a rematch against Fort McPherson as part of Atlanta's Thanksgiving festivities. The game was organized as an undercard to the highly anticipated Auburn-Georgia match happening later that the afternoon. An earlier event featuring a local performing a "daring" bike ride into the lake, caused the kickoff to be delayed. The game was stopped early as some of the participants had to be present at the Auburn-Georgia match-up (including Tech's coach who was to be the later game's umpire). Fort McPherson won the match 10-0.

== Players ==
Georgia Tech Techs 1896 game starters
	Mercer	Auburn	Fort McPherson	Mercer	Fort McPherson
Left End	Will Wheeler	Robertson	Cox	Butner	
Left Tackle	Robertson	Bullock	Bullock	Bullock	
Left Guard	Souby	Souby	Souby	Souby	
Center	Walter West	Walter West	Walter West	Walter West	
Right Guard	Bullock	Peak	Peak	Peak	
Right Tackle	Jones	Jones	Jones	Jones	
Right End	L. R. Hart	L. R. Hart	L. R. Hart	L. R. Hart	
Quarterback	Wright (C)	Wright (C)	Wright (C)	Wright (C)	
Left Halfback	J. C. Crawford	Joe Morton	Joe Morton	J. C. Crawford	
Right Halfback	Lee	Will Wheeler	J. C. Crawford	Will Wheeler	
Fullback	Freyer	Freyer	Freyer	Freyer	
Substitutes	Jim Everett • Frank Ogletree				
