= Arlie C. Jones =

American football player, coach, and doctor (1870–1923)

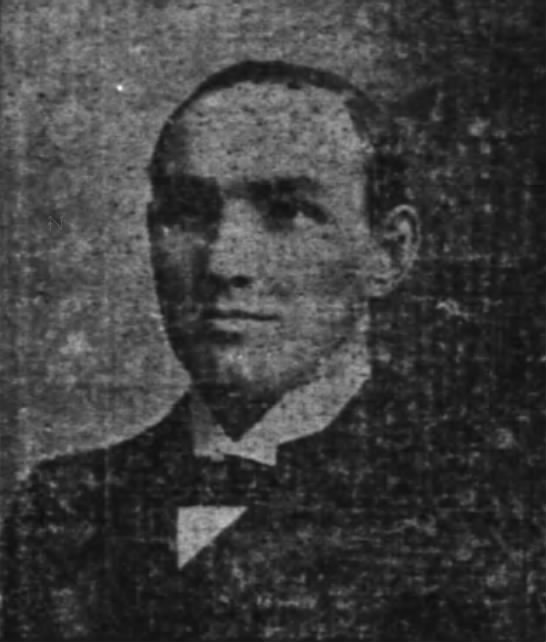

Biographical details
- Born: February 17, 1870; Highland, Virginia, U.S.
- Died: July 15, 1923 (aged 53); Covington, Virginia, U.S.

Playing career
- 1892–1894: Virginia
- Position: Halfback

Coaching career (HC unless noted)
- 1895–1896: VMAC / VPI
- 1898: Virginia (assistant)
- 1901: Ohio

Head coaching record
- Overall: 15–4–2

Arlington Cecil Jones (February 17, 1870 – July 15, 1923) was an American college football player, coach, and doctor. Jones played as a prominent halfback for the Virginia Cavaliers. He served as the head football coach at Virginia Tech—then known Virginia Agricultural and Mechanical College (VAMC) and renamed as Virginia Agricultural and Mechanical College and Polytechnic Institute (VPI)—from 1895 to 1896 and at Ohio University in 1901, compiling a career college football record of 15–4–2.

== Head coaching record ==
Year	Team	Overall	Conference	Standing	Bowl/playoffs
VAMC / VPI (Independent) (1895–1896)
1895	VAMC	4–2			
1896	VPI	5–1			
VMAC / VPI:		9–3			
Ohio Green and White (Independent) (1901)
1901	Ohio	6–1–2			
Ohio:		6–1–2			
Total:		15–4–2			
