= Tommy Code =

American football player and coach (1873–1956)

Biographical details
- Born: April 13, 1873; California, U.S.
- Died: January 28, 1956 (aged 82); San Francisco, California, U.S.

Playing career
- 1892–1895: Stanford
- Position: Quarterback

Coaching career (HC unless noted)
- 1896: Oregon Agricultural

Head coaching record
- Overall: 1–2

Thomas Kimball Code (April 13, 1873 – January 28, 1956) was an American college football player at Stanford University and football coach at Oregon State University, then known as Oregon Agricultural College.

== Career ==
Code grew up in San Francisco, where he attended Lowell High School. He went on to play college football at Stanford where he was the quarterback in the first Big Game against Cal.

In 1896, the 23-year old Code became the fourth head coach of Oregon Agricultural College (today's Oregon State University) in the program's first four seasons. According to a local news account, Code arrived in Corvallis to coach the team on Monday, September 28. Code would only coach the Aggies for a period of two weeks, after which he was sent home to California as what was deemed an "unnecessary expense," with OAC professor Fulton and halfback Brady Burnett taking over the actual coaching duties. During the 1896 season, the Aggies compiled a record of 1–2.

== Head coaching record ==
Year	Team	Overall	Conference	Standing	Bowl/playoffs
Oregon Agricultural Aggies (Independent) (1896)
1896	Oregon Agricultural	1–2			
Oregon Agricultural:		1–2			
Total:		1–2			
