= Ralph Nichols (American football) =

American football player, coach, and politician (1874–1949)

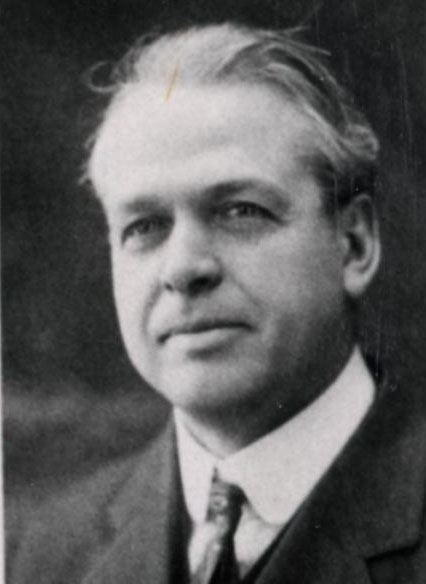
- Nichols in 1917

Biographical details
- Born: March 1, 1874; Panora, Iowa, U.S.
- Died: July 19, 1949 (aged 75); Seattle, Washington, U.S.

Playing career
- 1892–1894: Washington
- Position: Guard

Coaching career (HC unless noted)
- 1895–1896: Washington
- 1898: Washington
- 1899: Washington (assistant)

Head coaching record
- Overall: 7–4–1

President pro tempore of the Washington Senate
- In office January 8, 1917 – January 13, 1919
- Preceded by: Edward L. French
- Succeeded by: Phillip H. Carlyon

Member of the Washington State Senate for the 31st district
- In office 1907–1919

Personal details
- Party: Republican

Ralph Day Nichols (March 1, 1874 – July 19, 1949) was an American college football player and coach and politician. He served as the head coach at the University of Washington from 1895 to 1896 and again in 1898, compiling a record of 7–4–1.

Nichols later served in the Washington Senate from 1906 to 1919 and on the Seattle City Council from 1924 to 1934. From 1917 to 1919, he was president pro tempore of the Senate. Nichols died on July 19, 1949.

== Head coaching record ==
Year	Team	Overall	Conference	Standing	Bowl/playoffs
Washington (Independent) (1895–1896)
1895	Washington	4–0–1			
1896	Washington	2–3			
Washington (Independent) (1898)
1898	Washington	1–1			
Washington:		7–4–1			
Total:		7–4–1			
