= Martin V. Bergen =

American football player, coach, and lawyer (1872–1941)

Biographical details
- Born: January 29, 1872; Camden, New Jersey, U.S.
- Died: July 8, 1941 (aged 69); Philadelphia, Pennsylvania, U.S.

Playing career

Football
- 1891: Princeton

Baseball
- early 1890s: Princeton
- Positions: Halfback, fullback (football); Outfielder (baseball)

Coaching career (HC unless noted)

Football
- 1894–1895: Grinnell
- 1896–1897: Virginia
- 1902–1903: Grinnell
- 1905: Grinnell

Head coaching record
- Overall: 38–22–6

Martin Vorhees "Mike" Bergen Jr. (January 29, 1872 – July 8, 1941) was an American football player, coach, and lawyer. He served as the head football coach at Grinnell College (1894–1895, 1902–1903, 1905) and at the University of Virginia (1896–1897), compiling a career college football record of 38–22–6.

Bergen died of a heart attack at the age of 69 on July 8, 1941, in his apartment at the Racquet Club in Center City Philadelphia. He was the son of Christopher A. Bergen, United States Congressman who represented New Jersey's 1st congressional district from 1889 to 1893.

== Head coaching record ==
Year	Team	Overall	Conference	Standing	Bowl/playoffs
Grinnell Pioneers (Independent) (1894–1895)
1894	Grinnell	6–4			
1895	Grinnell	5–2			
Virginia Orange and Blue (Independent) (1896–1897)
1896	Virginia	7–2–2			
1897	Virginia	6–2–1			
Virginia:		13–4–3			
Grinnell Pioneers (Independent) (1902–1903)
1902	Grinnell	2–6–2			
1903	Grinnell	5–4			
Grinnell Pioneers (Independent) (1905)
1905	Grinnell	7–2–1			
Grinnell:		25–18–3			
Total:		38–22–6			
