= Harry Anderson (coach) =

American football coach

Biographical details
- Born: January 29, 1872; Kanawha County, West Virginia, U.S.
- Died: June 14, 1957 (aged 85); Charleston, West Virginia, U.S.
- Education: West Virginia University; Princeton University (1896)

Coaching career (HC unless noted)
- 1896–1897: Centre
- 1898: West Virginia

Head coaching record
- Overall: 16–3–1

Harry McClellan Anderson (January 29, 1872 – June 14, 1957) was an American college football coach. He served as the sixth head football coach at West Virginia University in Morgantown, West Virginia and he held that position for the 1898 season. His coaching record at West Virginia was 6–1.

Anderson also served as the head coach at Centre College in Danville, Kentucky during the 1896 and 1897 seasons.

== Head coaching record ==
Year	Team	Overall	Conference	Standing	Bowl/playoffs
Centre (Independent) (1896–1897)
1896	Centre	6–0–1			
1897	Centre	4–2–1			
West Virginia:		10–2–1			
West Virginia Mountaineers (Independent) (1898)
1898	West Virginia	6–1			
West Virginia:		6–1			
Total:		16–3–1			
