= David A. Brodie =

American agriculturalist and football coach (1867–1951)

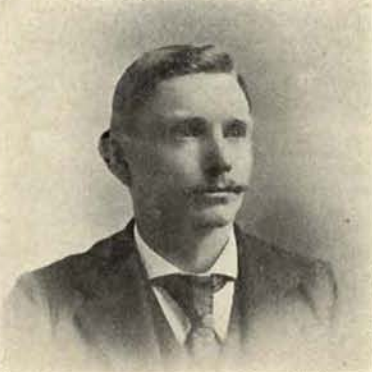
- Brodie pictured in The Chinook, 1899, Washington Agricultural yearbook

Biographical details
- Born: July 28, 1867; Peterborough, Ontario, Canada
- Died: December 29, 1951 (aged 84); Avon Park, Florida, U.S.

Playing career
- 1895: Washington Agricultural
- Position: Halfback

Coaching career (HC unless noted)
- 1896: Washington Agricultural

Head coaching record
- Overall: 2–0–1

David Arthur Brodie (July 28, 1867 – December 29, 1951) was an American agriculturalist and college football coach. He served as the head football coach at Washington Agricultural College and School of Science—now known as Washington State University—for one season, in 1896, compiling a record of 2–0–1.

Brodie was born in Peterborough, Ontario and moved with family in 1883 to a farm near Silverton, Oregon. He graduated from Oregon State Normal School—now known as Western Oregon University—in 1894. He graduated Washington Agricultural in 1898 and became an assistant professor there. Brodie later worked for the United States Department of Agriculture. He moved from Washington, D.C. to Avon Park, Florida around 1939, and died there, on December 29, 1951.

== Head coaching record ==
Year	Team	Overall	Conference	Standing	Bowl/playoffs
Washington Agricultural (Independent) (1896)
1896	Washington Agricultural	2–0–1			
Washington Agricultural:		2–0–1			
Total:		2–0–1			
