= Frank Taylor (American football) =

American football coach

Coaching career (HC unless noted)
- 1896: Nevada State

Head coaching record
- Overall: 1–2

Frank L. Taylor was the head coach of Nevada State University football team in 1896. It was his only year as a head coach of the team, then known as the Sagebrushers, and now known as the University of Nevada, Reno.

In 1896, the university, at that time the only institution of higher learning in the state of Nevada, investigated the possibility of adding football to their short list of athletic programs and hired Taylor from the University of California, Berkeley, for the purpose of developing and fielding the U's first gridiron squadron. They played only three games that year, the first of which was scheduled against Wadsworth AC and the second was the Belmont preparatory school to take place on "the hill" at the original Mackay Stadium, located in the depression at the middle of campus where the Mack Social Sciences, Reynolds School of Journalism and the auspicious Lecture Hall currently exist. The result was a complete debacle as Belmont relentlessly thrashed the hapless Sagebrushers (later Wolf Pack) by the tally of 70–0.

"But," the University of Nevada, Reno yearbook Artemesia would report five years later, "the team learned something about football by watching the Belmont boys play." Two weeks later and the 'Brushers met up with the Berkeley "Second Eleven" with much more favorable results (with NSU only giving up forty points.

"Thus the initial chapter of the athletic history of the University was one of defeat," sayeth the 1901 Artemesia.

== Head coaching record ==
Year	Team	Overall	Conference	Standing	Bowl/playoffs
Nevada State Sagebrushers (Independent) (1896)
1896	Nevada State	1–2			
Nevada State:		1–2			
Total:		1–2			
