= 1896 North Carolina Tar Heels football team =

American college football season

1896 North Carolina Tar Heels football
- Conference: Independent
- Record: 3–4–1
- Head coach: Gordon Johnston (1st season)
- Captain: Robert Wright
- Home stadium: Campus Athletic Field (I)

1896 Southern college football independents records
	Conf.			Overall
Team	W	L	T	W		L		T
Centre		–		6	–	0	–	1
Texas A&M		–		2	–	0	–	1
Oklahoma		–		2	–	0	–	0
North Carolina A&M		–		1	–	0	–	0
Virginia		–		7	–	2	–	2
VPI		–		5	–	2	–	1
Navy		–		5	–	3	–	0
Arkansas		–		2	–	1	–	0
Clemson		–		2	–	1	–	0
Columbian		–		2	–	1	–	0
Georgia Tech		–		2	–	2	–	1
Add-Ran		–		1	–	1	–	1
Centenary		–		1	–	1	–	0
VMI		–		3	–	4	–	0
North Carolina		–		3	–	4	–	1
Furman		–		2	–	3	–	0
Ole Miss		–		1	–	2	–	0
West Virginia		–		3	–	7	–	2
South Carolina		–		1	–	3	–	0
Erskine		–		0	–	1	–	0
William & Mary		–		0	–	2	–	0
Davidson		–		0	–	1	–	0
Delaware		–		0	–	6	–	0

The 1896 North Carolina Tar Heels football team represented the University of North Carolina in the 1896 college football season. They played eight games with a final record of 3–4–1. The team captain for the 1896 season was Robert Wright.

== Schedule ==
Date	Time	Opponent	Site	Result	Attendance	Source
October 10	2:16 p.m.	Guilford	Campus Athletic Field (I); Chapel Hill, NC	W 26–4		
October 17		at Guilford	Athletic Park (Greensboro); Greensboro, NC	W 34–0		
October 24		vs. VPI	Athletic Park (Danville); Danville, VA	T 0–0	700	
October 31	3:00 p.m.	vs. Georgia	Brisbine Park; Atlanta, GA	L 16–24	3,000	
November 2	3:30 p.m.	at Charlotte A.C.	Latta Park; Charlotte, NC	L 0–8		
November 7	3:30 p.m.	at Hampton A.C.	Riverview Park; Hampton, VA	L 0–18		
November 11		Greensboro A.A.	Campus Athletic Field (I); Chapel Hill, NC	W 30–0		
November 26	2:30 p.m.	vs. Virginia	West End Park; Richmond, VA (South's Oldest Rivalry)	L 0–46	10,000	
