= Perrin Busbee =

American football and baseball coach

Biographical details
- Born: February 10, 1872; Raleigh, North Carolina, U.S.
- Died: January 9, 1935 (aged 62); Raleigh, North Carolina, U.S.

Coaching career (HC unless noted)

Football
- 1892: North Carolina A&M
- 1896–1897: North Carolina A&M

Baseball
- 1891–1893: North Carolina

Head coaching record
- Overall: 3–2 (football); 9–6 (baseball)

Perrin Busbee (February 10, 1872 – January 9, 1935) was an American football and baseball coach. He served as the head football coach at North Carolina College of Agriculture and Mechanic Arts, now North Carolina State University, in 1892 again from 1896 to 1897, compiling a record of 3–2. Busbee was also the first head baseball coach at the University of North Carolina at Chapel Hill, coaching from 1891 to 1893 and tallying a mark of 9–6.

On Jan. 9, 1935, he died in Raleigh and is buried in Oakwood Cemetery.

== Head coaching record ==
=== Football ===
Year	Team	Overall	Conference	Standing	Bowl/playoffs
North Carolina A&M Aggies (Independent) (1892)
1892	North Carolina A&M	1–0			
North Carolina A&M Aggies (Independent) (1896–1897)
1896	North Carolina A&M	1–0			
1897	North Carolina A&M	1–2			
North Carolina A&M:		3–2			
Total:		3–2			

== See also ==
- List of college football head coaches with non-consecutive tenure
