= 1896 Washington football team =

American college football season

1896 Washington football
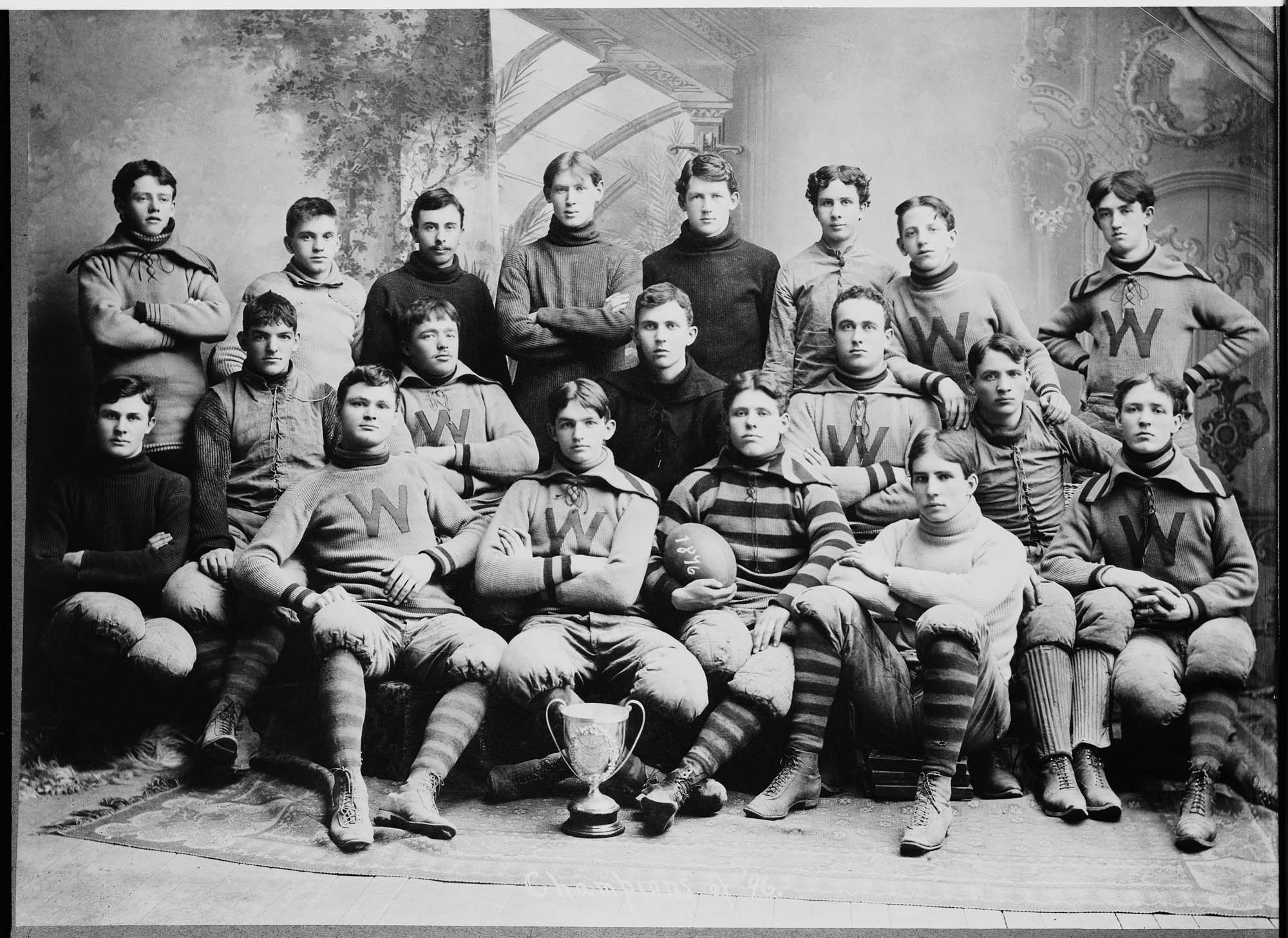

Champions of Seattle
- Conference: Independent
- Record: 2–3
- Head coach: Ralph Nichols (2nd season)
- Captain: Jack Lindsay
- Home stadium: YMCA Park

1896 Far West college football independents records
	Conf.			Overall
Team	W	L	T	W		L		T
Gonzaga		–		2	–	0	–	0
Wyoming		–		2	–	0	–	0
Washington Agricultural		–		2	–	0	–	1
California		–		6	–	2	–	2
Stanford		–		2	–	1	–	1
Oregon		–		2	–	1	–	0
Utah		–		3	–	2	–	0
Saint Mary's		–		1	–	1	–	0
Washington		–		2	–	3	–	0
Nevada State		–		1	–	2	–	0
Oregon Agricultural		–		1	–	2	–	0
Utah Agricultural		–		0	–	1	–	0
New Mexico A&M		–		0	–	2	–	0
USC		–		0	–	3	–	0

The 1896 Washington football team was an American football team that represented the University of Washington as an independent during the 1896 college football season. In its second season under coach Ralph Nichols, the team compiled a 2–3 record and was outscored by its opponents by a combined total of 40 to 20. Jack Lindsay was the team captain.

== Schedule ==
Date	Time	Opponent	Site	Result	Attendance	Source
October 24		Seattle Athletic Club	YMCA Park; Seattle, WA	L 4–6	300	
November 14		at Port Townsend Athletic Club	Port Townsend, WA	L 0–18	100	
November 21		Seattle Athletic Club	YMCA Park; Seattle, WA	Postponed (weather)		
November 28	2:30 p.m.	Port Townsend Athletic Club	YMCA Park; Seattle, WA	Cancelled		
December 12	3:30 p.m.	at Multnomah Athletic Club	Multnomah Field; Portland, OR	L 0–10	100	
December 15	2:30 p.m.	Seattle YMCA	YMCA Park; Seattle, WA	W 4–0	100	
December 19	2:30 p.m.	Seattle Athletic Club	YMCA Park; Seattle, WA	W 12–6	500	

== Preseason ==
By the first week of October, practice had resumed for the University of Washington football team. Head coach Ralph Nichols put the team through its paces, assisted by team captain Jack Lindsay, a halfback in 1895 projected as fullback in 1896. Professor Van der Veer was placed in charge of physical training, centered around running on the school's track.

"The uniform will be purple and gold stripes in both the sweater and the stockings," a contemporary news report noted.

The team captain for 1895, a center named Harris, did not return for the 1896 season.
