= Ira Pierce =

American football coach (1874–1906)

Biographical details
- Born: September 1874; Delaware, U.S.
- Died: July 16, 1906 (aged 31); Barksdale, Wisconsin, U.S.
- Education: University of Delaware

Coaching career (HC unless noted)

Baseball
- 1895: Delaware

Football
- 1896: Delaware

Head coaching record
- Overall: 0–6 (football)

Ira Liston Pierce (September 1874 – July 16, 1906) was an American chemist and college sports coach. He served as the head baseball coach of the University of Delaware in 1895 and as football coach in 1896.

Pierce was born in September 1874 and grew up in Wilmington, Delaware. He attended Wilmington High School, and after graduating from there, attended the University of Delaware. He graduated from the University of Delaware with a master's degree in science, and later served as a chemistry instructor at the school. After retiring from there, he became a chemist in Gibbstown, New Jersey.

While at the University of Delaware, he also coached their baseball team in 1895, and their football team in 1896, going winless in six games in football.

Pierce was killed in an explosion at the Atlantic Dynamite Company, where he worked as a superintendent, on July 16, 1906. His funeral was held on July 20.

== Head coaching record ==
=== Football ===
Year	Team	Overall	Conference	Standing	Bowl/playoffs
Delaware (Independent) (1896)
1896	Delaware	0–6			
Delaware:		0–6			
Total:		0–6			
