= 1896 Virginia Orange and Blue football team =

American college football season

1896 Virginia Orange and Blue football

Southern champion
- Conference: Independent
- Record: 7–2–2
- Head coach: Martin V. Bergen (1st season)
- Captain: Paul Lee Cocke
- Home stadium: Madison Hall Field

1896 Southern college football independents records
	Conf.			Overall
Team	W	L	T	W		L		T
Centre		–		6	–	0	–	1
Texas A&M		–		2	–	0	–	1
Oklahoma		–		2	–	0	–	0
North Carolina A&M		–		1	–	0	–	0
Virginia		–		7	–	2	–	2
VPI		–		5	–	2	–	1
Navy		–		5	–	3	–	0
Arkansas		–		2	–	1	–	0
Clemson		–		2	–	1	–	0
Columbian		–		2	–	1	–	0
Georgia Tech		–		2	–	2	–	1
Add-Ran		–		1	–	1	–	1
Centenary		–		1	–	1	–	0
VMI		–		3	–	4	–	0
North Carolina		–		3	–	4	–	1
Furman		–		2	–	3	–	0
Ole Miss		–		1	–	2	–	0
West Virginia		–		3	–	7	–	2
South Carolina		–		1	–	3	–	0
Erskine		–		0	–	1	–	0
William & Mary		–		0	–	2	–	0
Davidson		–		0	–	1	–	0
Delaware		–		0	–	6	–	0

The 1896 Virginia Orange and Bluefootball team represented the University of Virginia as an independent during the 1896 college football season. Led by first-year coach Martin V. Bergen, the team went 7–2–2 and claims a Southern championship. W. A. Martin played at end.

== Schedule ==
Date	Time	Opponent	Site	Result	Attendance	Source
October 3		Hampton Athletic Club	Madison Hall Field; Charlottesville, VA	T 10–10		
October 10		Miller School	Madison Hall Field; Charlottesville, VA	W 26–2		
October 14		at Penn	Franklin Field; Philadelphia, PA	L 0–20		
October 17		St. John's (MD)	Madison Hall Field; Charlottesville, VA	W 48–0		
October 21		at Princeton	University Field; Princeton, NJ	L 0–48	> 6,000	
October 31	4:00 p.m.	VPI	Madison Hall Field; Charlottesville, VA (rivalry)	W 44–0	600	
November 2		St. Albans	Madison Hall Field; Charlottesville, VA	W 6–0		
November 11		vs. VMI	Lynchburg, VA	W 46–0		
November 14		at Hampton Athletic Club		T 6–6		
November 21		Gallaudet	Madison Hall Field; Charlottesville, VA	W 6–0		
November 26	2:30 p.m.	vs. North Carolina	West-End Park; Richmond, VA (South's Oldest Rivalry)	W 46–0	8,000–9,000	

== Season summary ==
=== Week 5: at Princeton ===
The Princeton Tigers defeated Virginia, 48 to 0; "the game was too one-sided to be interesting."
