= 1896 Utah Agricultural Aggies football team =

American college football season

1896 Utah Agricultural Aggies football
- Conference: Independent
- Record: 0–1
- Head coach: J. Walter Mayo (1st season)

1896 Far West college football independents records
	Conf.			Overall
Team	W	L	T	W		L		T
Gonzaga		–		2	–	0	–	0
Wyoming		–		2	–	0	–	0
Washington Agricultural		–		2	–	0	–	1
California		–		6	–	2	–	2
Stanford		–		2	–	1	–	1
Oregon		–		2	–	1	–	0
Utah		–		3	–	2	–	0
Saint Mary's		–		1	–	1	–	0
Washington		–		2	–	3	–	0
Nevada State		–		1	–	2	–	0
Oregon Agricultural		–		1	–	2	–	0
Utah Agricultural		–		0	–	1	–	0
New Mexico A&M		–		0	–	2	–	0
USC		–		0	–	3	–	0

The 1896 Utah Agricultural Aggies football team was an American football team that represented Utah Agricultural College (later renamed Utah State University) during the 1896 college football season. In their second season of intercollegiate football (following a hiatus during the 1893, 1894, and 1895 seasons), the Aggies compiled a 0–1 record.

On Thanksgiving Day, November 26, 1896, the Aggies played the team from Brigham Young College in the second intercollegiate game in Utah Agricultural history. Brigham Young won by a 6-0 score. The Aggies' lineup against Brigham Young was as follows: Evans at left end; Preston Peterson at left tackle; Nelson at left guard; Webster at center; Martineau at right guard; Bunot at right tackle; Sutton at right end; Walter McLaughlin at quarterback; Willard Langton at left halfback; Ralph at right halfback; and John Bankhead at fullback.

== Schedule ==
Date	Opponent	Site	Result	Attendance	Source
November 26	at Brigham Young College	B.Y. College campus; Logan, UT	L 0–6	200	
