= 1896 Oklahoma Sooners football team =

American college football season

1896 Oklahoma Sooners football
- Conference: Independent
- Record: 2–0
- Head coach: None
- Captain: Ray Hume

1896 Southern college football independents records
	Conf.			Overall
Team	W	L	T	W		L		T
Centre		–		6	–	0	–	1
Texas A&M		–		2	–	0	–	1
Oklahoma		–		2	–	0	–	0
North Carolina A&M		–		1	–	0	–	0
Virginia		–		7	–	2	–	2
VPI		–		5	–	2	–	1
Navy		–		5	–	3	–	0
Arkansas		–		2	–	1	–	0
Clemson		–		2	–	1	–	0
Columbian		–		2	–	1	–	0
Georgia Tech		–		2	–	2	–	1
Add-Ran		–		1	–	1	–	1
Centenary		–		1	–	1	–	0
VMI		–		3	–	4	–	0
North Carolina		–		3	–	4	–	1
Furman		–		2	–	3	–	0
Ole Miss		–		1	–	2	–	0
West Virginia		–		3	–	7	–	2
South Carolina		–		1	–	3	–	0
Erskine		–		0	–	1	–	0
William & Mary		–		0	–	2	–	0
Davidson		–		0	–	1	–	0
Delaware		–		0	–	6	–	0

The 1896 Oklahoma Sooners football team represented the University of Oklahoma as an independent during the 1896 college football season. In their second year of football, the Sooners compiled a 2–0 record (both against Norman High School) and cumulatively outscored the Tigers by a combined total of 28 to 4.

== Schedule ==
Date	Opponent	Site	Result	Source
November 13	at Norman High School	High school field; Norman, Oklahoma Territory	W 12–0	
November 26	Norman High School	Vacant field west of campus, south of Boyd Street; Norman, Oklahoma Territory	W 16–4	

== Roster ==
1896 Oklahoma Sooners football
Edwin Barrow; H. T. Burson; Jasper Clapham; Harry Ford	Hugh Haycraft; John Hefley; Paul Mackey; Bill McCutcheon	Fred Merkle; Joe Merkle; Columbus Roberts
