= 1896 Ole Miss Rebels football team =

American college football season

1896 Ole Miss Rebels football
- Conference: Independent
- Record: 1–2
- Head coach: John W. Hollister (1st season)

1896 Southern college football independents records
	Conf.			Overall
Team	W	L	T	W		L		T
Centre		–		6	–	0	–	1
Texas A&M		–		2	–	0	–	1
Oklahoma		–		2	–	0	–	0
North Carolina A&M		–		1	–	0	–	0
Virginia		–		7	–	2	–	2
VPI		–		5	–	2	–	1
Navy		–		5	–	3	–	0
Arkansas		–		2	–	1	–	0
Clemson		–		2	–	1	–	0
Columbian		–		2	–	1	–	0
Georgia Tech		–		2	–	2	–	1
Add-Ran		–		1	–	1	–	1
Centenary		–		1	–	1	–	0
VMI		–		3	–	4	–	0
North Carolina		–		3	–	4	–	1
Furman		–		2	–	3	–	0
Ole Miss		–		1	–	2	–	0
West Virginia		–		3	–	7	–	2
South Carolina		–		1	–	3	–	0
Erskine		–		0	–	1	–	0
William & Mary		–		0	–	2	–	0
Davidson		–		0	–	1	–	0
Delaware		–		0	–	6	–	0

The 1896 Ole Miss Rebels football team represented the University of Mississippi as an independent during the 1896 college football season. Led by John W. Hollister in his first and only season as head coach, Ole Miss compiled a record of 1–2.

== Schedule ==
Date	Opponent	Site	Result	Source
	St. Thomas Hall	Oxford, MS	W 20–0	
November 13	vs. LSU	Vicksburg, MS (rivalry)	L 4–12	
November 26	at Tulane	Tulane Athletic Field; New Orleans, LA (rivalry)	L 0–10	
