= 1896 USC Methodists football team =

American college football season

1896 USC Methodists football
- Conference: Independent
- Record: 0–3
- Head coach: None
- Captain: Foster Wright

1896 Far West college football independents records
	Conf.			Overall
Team	W	L	T	W		L		T
Gonzaga		–		2	–	0	–	0
Wyoming		–		2	–	0	–	0
Washington Agricultural		–		2	–	0	–	1
California		–		6	–	2	–	2
Stanford		–		2	–	1	–	1
Oregon		–		2	–	1	–	0
Utah		–		3	–	2	–	0
Saint Mary's		–		1	–	1	–	0
Washington		–		2	–	3	–	0
Nevada State		–		1	–	2	–	0
Oregon Agricultural		–		1	–	2	–	0
Utah Agricultural		–		0	–	1	–	0
New Mexico A&M		–		0	–	2	–	0
USC		–		0	–	3	–	0

The 1896 USC Methodists football team was an American football team that represented the University of Southern California during the 1896 college football season. The team competed as an independent without a head coach, compiling a 0–3 record.

== Schedule ==
Date	Opponent	Site	Result	Attendance
October 24	Whittier Reform	Los Angeles, CA	L 0–30	
October 31	vs. Los Angeles AC	Athletic Park; Los Angeles, CA	L 0–22	1,500
November 14	vs. Throop	Athletic Park; Los Angeles, CA	L 0–22	
