= 1896 Clemson Tigers football team =

American college football season

1896 Clemson Tigers football
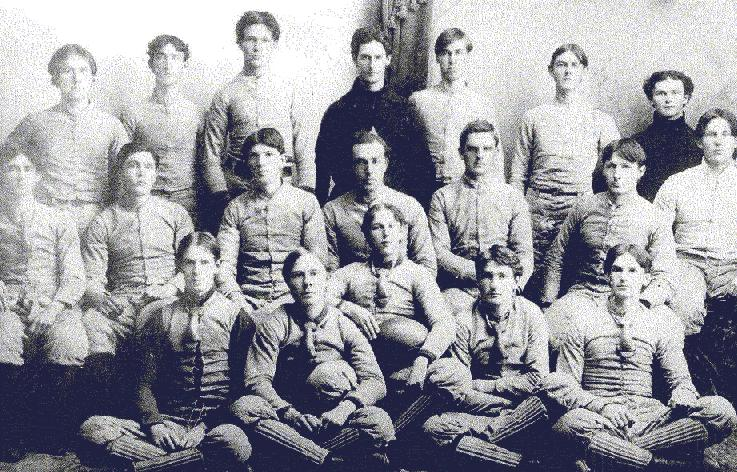
- Conference: Independent
- Record: 2–1
- Head coach: Walter Riggs (1st season)
- Captain: R. G. Hamilton

1896 Southern college football independents records
	Conf.			Overall
Team	W	L	T	W		L		T
Centre		–		6	–	0	–	1
Texas A&M		–		2	–	0	–	1
Oklahoma		–		2	–	0	–	0
North Carolina A&M		–		1	–	0	–	0
Virginia		–		7	–	2	–	2
VPI		–		5	–	2	–	1
Navy		–		5	–	3	–	0
Arkansas		–		2	–	1	–	0
Clemson		–		2	–	1	–	0
Columbian		–		2	–	1	–	0
Georgia Tech		–		2	–	2	–	1
Add-Ran		–		1	–	1	–	1
Centenary		–		1	–	1	–	0
VMI		–		3	–	4	–	0
North Carolina		–		3	–	4	–	1
Furman		–		2	–	3	–	0
Ole Miss		–		1	–	2	–	0
West Virginia		–		3	–	7	–	2
South Carolina		–		1	–	3	–	0
Erskine		–		0	–	1	–	0
William & Mary		–		0	–	2	–	0
Davidson		–		0	–	1	–	0
Delaware		–		0	–	6	–	0

The 1896 Clemson Tigers football team represented Clemson Agricultural College—now known as Clemson University–as an independent during the 1896 college football season. Professor Walter Riggs brought the game to Clemson from his alma mater, Auburn, where he was a member of Auburn's first football team. The Tigers completed their first season with a record of 2–1, with wins over upstate neighboring colleges Furman and Wofford, and a loss in the first installment of the rivalry with South Carolina. All games were played in the opposing school's home city. The rivalry matchup with South Carolina was held on Thursday morning at the South Carolina state fair, a tradition that would endure until 1960. Riggs served as the team's coach while R. G. Hamilton was the first captain.

== Schedule ==
Date	Opponent	Site	Result
October 31	at Furman	Greenville, SC	W 14–6
November 12	at South Carolina	Columbia, SC (Big Thursday)	L 6–12
November 21	at Wofford	Spartanburg, SC	W 16–0

== Players ==
Clemson states these were the starting players.

=== Line ===
Player	Position	Class
J.H. Blain	left end	Sr.
Charlie Gentry	right end	So.
Jock Hanvey	right tackle	Fr.
L.L. Hendricks	left guard	So.
Shack Shealy	right guard	Fr.
George Swygert	center	Jr.
J.D. White	left tackle	Fr.

=== Backfield ===
Player	Position	Class
A.G. Chreitzberg	fullback	Sr.
R.G. Hamilton	right halfback	Sr.
Jeff Maxwell	quarterback	Jr.
F.G. Thompkins	left halfback	Sr.
