= 1896 South Carolina Gamecocks football team =

American college football season

1896 South Carolina Gamecocks football
- Conference: Independent
- Record: 1–3
- Head coach: Richard S. Whaley (1st season)
- Captain: C. H. McLaurin

1896 Southern college football independents records
	Conf.			Overall
Team	W	L	T	W		L		T
Centre		–		6	–	0	–	1
Texas A&M		–		2	–	0	–	1
Oklahoma		–		2	–	0	–	0
North Carolina A&M		–		1	–	0	–	0
Virginia		–		7	–	2	–	2
VPI		–		5	–	2	–	1
Navy		–		5	–	3	–	0
Arkansas		–		2	–	1	–	0
Clemson		–		2	–	1	–	0
Columbian		–		2	–	1	–	0
Georgia Tech		–		2	–	2	–	1
Add-Ran		–		1	–	1	–	1
Centenary		–		1	–	1	–	0
VMI		–		3	–	4	–	0
North Carolina		–		3	–	4	–	1
Furman		–		2	–	3	–	0
Ole Miss		–		1	–	2	–	0
West Virginia		–		3	–	7	–	2
South Carolina		–		1	–	3	–	0
Erskine		–		0	–	1	–	0
William & Mary		–		0	–	2	–	0
Davidson		–		0	–	1	–	0
Delaware		–		0	–	6	–	0

The 1896 South Carolina Gamecocks football team represented South Carolina College—now known as the University of South Carolina–as an independent during the 1896 college football season. Led by Richard S. Whaley in his first and only season as head coach, South Carolina compiled a record of 1–3. The team played Clemson for the first time.

== Schedule ==
Date	Opponent	Site	Result
October 31	at Charleston Y	Charleston, SC	L 4–6
November 12	Clemson	Columbia, SC (Big Thursday)	W 12–6
November 19	Wofford	Columbia, SC	L 4–6
November 26	at Furman	Greenville, SC	L 4–6
