= 1896 Oregon Webfoots football team =

American college football season

1896 Oregon Webfoots football
- Team on the steps of Villard Hall
- Conference: Independent
- Record: 2–1
- Head coach: J. F. Frick (1st season)
- Captain: J. M. Edmundson
- Home stadium: Kincaid Field

1896 Far West college football independents records
| | Conf. | | | Overall |
| Team | W | L | T | W | | L | | T |
|---|---|---|---|---|---|---|---|---|
| Gonzaga | | – | | 2 | – | 0 | – | 0 |
| Wyoming | | – | | 2 | – | 0 | – | 0 |
| Washington Agricultural | | – | | 2 | – | 0 | – | 1 |
| California | | – | | 6 | – | 2 | – | 2 |
| Stanford | | – | | 2 | – | 1 | – | 1 |
| Oregon | | – | | 2 | – | 1 | – | 0 |
| Utah | | – | | 3 | – | 2 | – | 0 |
| Saint Mary's | | – | | 1 | – | 1 | – | 0 |
| Washington | | – | | 2 | – | 3 | – | 0 |
| Nevada State | | – | | 1 | – | 2 | – | 0 |
| Oregon Agricultural | | – | | 1 | – | 2 | – | 0 |
| Utah Agricultural | | – | | 0 | – | 1 | – | 0 |
| New Mexico A&M | | – | | 0 | – | 2 | – | 0 |
| USC | | – | | 0 | – | 3 | – | 0 |

The 1896 Oregon Webfoots football team represented the University of Oregon in the 1896 college football season. It was the Webfoots' third season; they competed as an independent and were led by head coach J. F. Frick. They finished the season with a record of two wins and one loss (2–1).

The University of Oregon opened up its 1896–97 academic year on September 14 with an enrollment of 300, the largest in the history of the institution.

== Schedule ==
| Date | Opponent | Site | Result | Attendance | Source |
|---|---|---|---|---|---|
| November 7 | Oregon Agricultural | Kincaid Field; Eugene, OR (rivalry) | W 2–0 | "a small number" | |
| November 14 | at Oregon Agricultural | OAC Field; Corvallis, OR | W 12–8 | 300 | |
| November 26 | at Multnomah Athletic Club | Multnomah Field; Portland, OR | L 6–12 | 2,500 | |
