= 1896 Oregon Agricultural Aggies football team =

American college football season

1896 Oregon Agricultural Aggies football
- Conference: Oregon Intercollegiate Football Association
- Record: 1–2 ( OIFA)
- Head coach: Tommy Code (1st season)
- Captain: Arthur Stimpson
- Home stadium: OAC Field

1896 Far West college football independents records
	Conf.			Overall
Team	W	L	T	W		L		T
Gonzaga		–		2	–	0	–	0
Wyoming		–		2	–	0	–	0
Washington Agricultural		–		2	–	0	–	1
California		–		6	–	2	–	2
Stanford		–		2	–	1	–	1
Oregon		–		2	–	1	–	0
Utah		–		3	–	2	–	0
Saint Mary's		–		1	–	1	–	0
Washington		–		2	–	3	–	0
Nevada State		–		1	–	2	–	0
Oregon Agricultural		–		1	–	2	–	0
Utah Agricultural		–		0	–	1	–	0
New Mexico A&M		–		0	–	2	–	0
USC		–		0	–	3	–	0

The 1896 Oregon Agricultural Aggies football team represented Oregon Agricultural College (OAC)—now known as Oregon State University—during the 1896 college football season. In this fourth season of their existence, the Aggies were briefly coached by Tommy Code before he was sent home to California as an "unnecessary expense," and was replaced as coach by two of the college's professors. The Aggies compiled a 1–2 record and outscored their opponents 22 to 10. They defeated Fort Vancouver, 18–0, but lost two games against Oregon by scores of 2–0 and 8–4. A. J. Simpson was the team captain.

== Schedule ==
Date	Opponent	Site	Result	Attendance	Source
November 7	at Oregon	Kincaid Field; Eugene, OR (rivalry)	L 0–2		
November 14	Oregon	OAC Field; Corvallis, OR	L 4–8	300	
	Fort Vancouver		W 18–0		

== Preliminary history ==
The College Barometer, monthly magazine produced by the literary societies of Oregon Agricultural College (OAC), revisited the disappointment of the 1895 season:

"...[A]fter gaining nothing but defeats for their hard work, the team disbanded in a bad humor in the late fall, thinking football was out of their line of business. There was enough of the old spirit left, however, to call the more enthusiastic members of the team together for reorganization at the end of the college year, in the following June. At this time Ralph W. Terrell was elected manager of the team and A.J. Simpson was elected as its captain... During the summer vacation manager Terrell began to cast his eye in various directions in search of a competent coach."

Terrell and other OAC football supporters turned to 23-year old Tommy Code, former quarterback for the University of California, as the team's coach for the 1896 season. Code arrived in Corvallis from the Golden State on Monday, September 28, after school had already started. He was present in town for a period of three weeks, during which "he found a very few old players and some who had never seen a football and out of these was to be hewn the solid timbers for a new football team," the OAC literary magazine enthused.

Fundraising in support of the 1896 OAC football team began in October with the staging of the Gilbert and Sullivan comic opera The Mikado. Local talent was used in the production of the event. Practice began in earnest that same month.

== Scheduling ==
A slate of four to five games was arranged, kicking off on November 7 with a "practice game" against the University of Oregon Webfoots in Eugene, followed by a "league game" against the same squad at OAC Field in Corvallis. According to an account in the Corvallis Times, "The Saturday following the winner plays Willamette University at Salem. The winner of that game will be the intercollegiate champions of Oregon this season." This was to be followed on November 28 by a game at OAC Field against Pacific University, with a December 5 tilt against Willamette University planned. "Of these games, only the contest transpiring next Saturday [November 14] and the Saturday following [November 21] will be league games," the Corvallis Times reported.

In addition, a taunt by the soldiers at Fort Vancouver barracks was published in a paper they published called The Sport which declared, "The Oregon Agricultural College team makes a bluff about playing the soldiers a game of football next Saturday in Vancouver. Come on, OAC. You were given the chance to come last year and have all your expenses paid, but you were not men enough to even answer the challenge until the day before the game. Ready to meet you any time." These words were republished in the Corvallis press and the challenge was therefore duly noted.

== Game summaries ==
=== Game 1: at Oregon ===
November 7 was the date of the debut game of the OAC football team against the University of Oregon. This initial affair was deemed a "practice game," in preparation for the actual league event to be held in Corvallis the following week. The game was won by Oregon by a score of 2 to 0 — a result which the local press excused as "a much better showing than the boys from this city expected to make, as it was the first matched game many of them had ever participated in."

The Corvallis Gazette opined that "the [Oregon] university men counted on a score of about 40 to zero, in their favor," but at the end of the game "they had to change their count" owing to the pesky play of the "Farmers." "They played all around the Dudes and bucked their line in grand style," the paper added, noting that OAC quarterback Bruce Barnett figured out the Webfoots' signals and directed the OAC defense accordingly. This was followed by a controversial ejection of Barnett for alleged "slugging" by Oregon coach Frick, who was acting as umpire in the friendly game.

At 3 pm there were only a small number of enthusiasts out in the rain to watch the exhibition game. The Oregon squad entered seven minutes later, followed five minutes after that by the OAC team and the game proceeded forthwith. Having absorbed a steady rain since the previous evening, the field was in a sloppy condition that made play difficult.

OAC was somewhat effective running the ball up the middle, while Oregon's primary attack involved runs around end; the bulk of the first half was spent in the Aggies' end of the field, with UO driving to the 10 yard line when time expired in the period.

The second half saw the two roughly evenly-matched teams play to a draw, with the only points coming when an Oregon defender tackled OAC in their own end zone, producing a two point safety.

Officiating was used as an excuse for the defeat, with the Corvallis Times noting "the boys claim that the umpire used them unjustly on several occasions." A referee and umpire from Portland were to be called upon to officiate the rematch planned for November 14 in Corvallis.

==== Lineup ====
- Left End: Osburn
- Left Tackle: J.J. Thurston
- Left Guard: George W. Feathers
- Center: Harvey McAllister
- Right Guard: Henry Kuhl
- Right Tackle: Fred C. Walters
- Right End: Ed W. Stimpson
- Quarterback: Bruce Burnett
- Fullback: O.N. Breithaupt
- Left Halfback: Art Stimpson (captain)
- Right Halfback: F.E. Hague

Reserves: John H. Gault, T.L. Owen, Don Holgate

=== Game 2: vs. Oregon ===
The OAC squad practiced for their game against Oregon under the tutelage of professors Fulton and Brady Burnett, as coach Tommy Code had been sent home to California as an "unnecessary expense" just ahead of the season. Burnett was a former star halfback of OAC's debut 1893–94 team.

The game proved to be a mud bowl, with a soaking rain transforming the field into an obstacle course of mud and water. About 300 stoic fans were in attendance.

The game began at 3:00 PM and quickly proved to be a violent affair, with OAC quarterback Bruce Barnett punched in the stomach on the first play of the game and knocked out by injury early in the first half. The game was a sloppy one, with one news account wryly noting "to avoid a constant repetition of the term 'fumble' it will be necessary to refrain from describing the game in detail. There were more fumbles than anything else, and fumbles on both sides," with the University of Oregon generally doing the superior job of recovering the ball.

After about 20 minutes of play, during which the ball changed hands several times, Oregon ran the ball over the OAC goal line for a touchdown, taking a 4–0 lead that was not extended when their attempt at conversion failed. This lead held up until halftime.

In the second half, OAC received the kick, with several exchanges of the ball again following. The big play for OAC came when substitute fullback Brady Barnett dropped back to punt but faked the kick, instead running around end to score from midfield. The conversion was again botched and the scored therefore remained tied 4–4 after 20 minutes of play in the half.

A fumbled punt by OAC set up Oregon on the 20 yard line, with the Webfoots' Templeton finally crossing the goal line to take an 8–4 lead, fumbling on his way in but being awarded the points nonetheless.

Further violence marred the game when OAC substitute Kelsay took umbrage to a reversal of a call by referee Otto Burckhardt of the Multnomah Athletic Club. When challenged over his decision to take the ball away from OAC and give it to the visiting Oregon squad, referee Burckhardt reportedly said, "the man who doesn't like the decision is a son of a bitch," causing Kelsay to swing at the official — who charged the player, landing several blows before being punched in the face himself. The player and official were separated and Kelsay thrown out of the game.

This perspective was not shared by Oregon coach J. G. Frick, who wrote for the Eugene press that while the OAC team were "in the main gentlemanly fellows and played fair ball," Aggie player Kelsay, who was "simply registered at the OAC because of his ability as a bruiser," engaged in an "assault" that was "entirely unprovoked" and which constituted "the most cowardly and outrageous proceeding ever seen on a football field. The Corvallis fans were cast in an even worse light, numbering among them many "whose training in even common decency has been sadly neglected. They neglected no opportunity to insult and revile the Eugene contingent and conducted themselves in a way which was a disgrace to any community."

As the game drew towards its conclusion OAC managed to work the ball down to the Oregon 10 yard line, but time expired before they were able to generate points from their favorable field position, with the score of 8–4 therefore going final.

==== Lineup ====
- Left End: Osburn
- Left Tackle: Walters
- Left Guard: Bodine
- Center: McAllister
- Right Guard: Kuhl
- Right Tackle: Thurston
- Right End: Ed Stimpson
- Quarterback: Bruce Burnett
- Fullback: Breithaupt
- Left Halfback: Holgate
- Right Halfback: Art Stimpson (captain)

Reserves: Burnett, Hague, Owens, Gault, Weaver, Feathers

=== Game 3: vs. Fort Vancouver ===
According to the Oregon State University sports information department, the Aggies answered the challenge of the Fort Vancouver Orions football club and played a game, won by OAC by a score of 18–0. No contemporary news accounts of this game have thus far been located.

In its two issue review of the season, the 1896 College Barometer makes no mention of a third game against Fort Vancouver — only intra-class contests between the Sophomores and the Freshmen, won by the older class 18–0, and the combined Sophomores and Freshmen against the combined Juniors and Seniors, again won by the older team, 6–4.
