= 1896 Nevada State Sagebrushers football team =

American college football season

1896 Nevada State Sagebrushers football
- Conference: Independent
- Record: 1–2
- Head coach: Frank Taylor (1st season)
- Home stadium: Evans Field

1896 Far West college football independents records
	Conf.			Overall
Team	W	L	T	W		L		T
Gonzaga		–		2	–	0	–	0
Wyoming		–		2	–	0	–	0
Washington Agricultural		–		2	–	0	–	1
California		–		6	–	2	–	2
Stanford		–		2	–	1	–	1
Oregon		–		2	–	1	–	0
Utah		–		3	–	2	–	0
Saint Mary's		–		1	–	1	–	0
Washington		–		2	–	3	–	0
Nevada State		–		1	–	2	–	0
Oregon Agricultural		–		1	–	2	–	0
Utah Agricultural		–		0	–	1	–	0
New Mexico A&M		–		0	–	2	–	0
USC		–		0	–	3	–	0

The 1896 Nevada State Sagebrushers football team was an American football team that represented Nevada State University (now known as the University of Nevada, Reno) as an independent during the 1896 college football season. The Sagebrushers were led by Frank Taylor in his first and only year as head coach.

== Schedule ==
Date	Opponent	Site	Result
October 24	Wadsworth AC	Evans Field; Reno, NV	W 30–0
November 7	Belmont Academy (OR)	Evans Field; Reno, NV	L 0–74
November 26	California B (JV) Team	Evans Field; Reno, NV	L 0–40
