= 1896 Arkansas Industrial Cardinals football team =

American college football season

1896 Arkansas Industrial Cardinals football
- Conference: Independent
- Record: 2–1
- Head coach: John C. Futrall (3rd season)
- Captain: Herbert Fishback

1896 Southern college football independents records
	Conf.			Overall
Team	W	L	T	W		L		T
Centre		–		6	–	0	–	1
Texas A&M		–		2	–	0	–	1
Oklahoma		–		2	–	0	–	0
North Carolina A&M		–		1	–	0	–	0
Virginia		–		7	–	2	–	2
VPI		–		5	–	2	–	1
Navy		–		5	–	3	–	0
Arkansas		–		2	–	1	–	0
Clemson		–		2	–	1	–	0
Columbian		–		2	–	1	–	0
Georgia Tech		–		2	–	2	–	1
Add-Ran		–		1	–	1	–	1
Centenary		–		1	–	1	–	0
VMI		–		3	–	4	–	0
North Carolina		–		3	–	4	–	1
Furman		–		2	–	3	–	0
Ole Miss		–		1	–	2	–	0
West Virginia		–		3	–	7	–	2
South Carolina		–		1	–	3	–	0
Erskine		–		0	–	1	–	0
William & Mary		–		0	–	2	–	0
Davidson		–		0	–	1	–	0
Delaware		–		0	–	6	–	0

The 1896 Arkansas Industrial Cardinals football team represented the University of Arkansas during the 1896 college football season. During the 1896 season, Arkansas again played two games against Fort Smith High School. Arkansas won both games by scores of 10–0 and 6–2. On October 24, 1896, Arkansas played the second intercollegiate football game in program history, facing the team from Drury College in Springfield, Missouri. Drury defeated Arkansas by a 34–0 score.

The roster of the 1896 football team included the following players: H. Y. Fishback (captain); L. R. Putnam; Frank James; T. O. Potts; R. P. Rutherford; V. V. Allen; E. Carter; J. W. Pollard; A. J. McDaniel; L. G. Crowley; J. Mitchell; G. W. Gunnell; F. Horsfall; L. F. Owens; and T. A. Edwards. John C. Futrall was the team's "manager", and B. N. Wilson was the "trainer".

== Schedule ==
Date	Time	Opponent	Site	Result	Source
October 3		Fort Smith High School	Fayetteville, AR	W 10–0	
October 10		at Fort Smith High School	Fort Smith, AR	W 6–2	
November 26	3:00 p.m.	at Drury	Drury athletic field; Springfield, MO	L 0–34	
