= 1896 Columbian Orange and Blue football team =

American college football season

1896 Columbian Orange and Blue football
- Conference: Independent
- Record: 2–1
- Head coach: Graham Nichols (1st season)

1896 Southern college football independents records
	Conf.			Overall
Team	W	L	T	W		L		T
Centre		–		6	–	0	–	1
Texas A&M		–		2	–	0	–	1
Oklahoma		–		2	–	0	–	0
North Carolina A&M		–		1	–	0	–	0
Virginia		–		7	–	2	–	2
VPI		–		5	–	2	–	1
Navy		–		5	–	3	–	0
Arkansas		–		2	–	1	–	0
Clemson		–		2	–	1	–	0
Columbian		–		2	–	1	–	0
Georgia Tech		–		2	–	2	–	1
Add-Ran		–		1	–	1	–	1
Centenary		–		1	–	1	–	0
VMI		–		3	–	4	–	0
North Carolina		–		3	–	4	–	1
Furman		–		2	–	3	–	0
Ole Miss		–		1	–	2	–	0
West Virginia		–		3	–	7	–	2
South Carolina		–		1	–	3	–	0
Erskine		–		0	–	1	–	0
William & Mary		–		0	–	2	–	0
Davidson		–		0	–	1	–	0
Delaware		–		0	–	6	–	0

The 1896 Columbian Orange and Blue football team was an American football team that represented Columbian University (now known as George Washington University) as an independent during the 1896 college football season. In first second season under head coach Graham Nichols, the team compiled a 2–1 record.

== Schedule ==
Date	Opponent	Site	Result	Source
October 30	Central High School	Columbia A.C. Field; Washington, DC	W 22–0	
November 14	at St. John's (MD)	Annapolis, MD	No contest	
November 21	at Episcopal High School	Alexandria, VA	W 40–0	
November 26	at Gallaudet	Kendall Green; Washington, DC	L 8–10	
