= 1896 Delaware football team =

American college football season

1896 Delaware football
- Conference: Independent
- Record: 0–6
- Head coach: Ira Pierce (1st season)

1896 Southern college football independents records
	Conf.			Overall
Team	W	L	T	W		L		T
Centre		–		6	–	0	–	1
Texas A&M		–		2	–	0	–	1
Oklahoma		–		2	–	0	–	0
North Carolina A&M		–		1	–	0	–	0
Virginia		–		7	–	2	–	2
VPI		–		5	–	2	–	1
Navy		–		5	–	3	–	0
Arkansas		–		2	–	1	–	0
Clemson		–		2	–	1	–	0
Columbian		–		2	–	1	–	0
Georgia Tech		–		2	–	2	–	1
Add-Ran		–		1	–	1	–	1
Centenary		–		1	–	1	–	0
VMI		–		3	–	4	–	0
North Carolina		–		3	–	4	–	1
Furman		–		2	–	3	–	0
Ole Miss		–		1	–	2	–	0
West Virginia		–		3	–	7	–	2
South Carolina		–		1	–	3	–	0
Erskine		–		0	–	1	–	0
William & Mary		–		0	–	2	–	0
Davidson		–		0	–	1	–	0
Delaware		–		0	–	6	–	0

The 1896 Delaware football team was an American football team that represented Delaware College (later renamed the University of Delaware) as an independent during the 1896 college football season. The team was led by its first head coach, Ira Pierce, and compiled a record of 0–6.

== Schedule ==
Date	Time	Opponent	Site	Result	Source
October 3	3:30 p.m.	Villanova	Riverview; Wilmington, DE (rivalry)	L 0–14	
October 17		at Swarthmore	Swarthmore, PA	L 0–44	
October 24		Haverford	Newark, DE	L 0–24	
October 31	3:30 p.m.	Wilmington Conference Academy	Riverview, DE	L 0–12	
November 18		at Pennsylvania Military	Chester, PA	L 0–14	
November 21		Haverford	Wilmington, DE	L 0–6	
