= 1896 Wyoming Cowboys football team =

American college football season

1896 Wyoming Cowboys football
- Conference: Independent
- Record: 2–0
- Head coach: Justus F. Soule (3rd season)
- Captain: Herbert J. Brees

1896 Far West college football independents records
	Conf.			Overall
Team	W	L	T	W		L		T
Gonzaga		–		2	–	0	–	0
Wyoming		–		2	–	0	–	0
Washington Agricultural		–		2	–	0	–	1
California		–		6	–	2	–	2
Stanford		–		2	–	1	–	1
Oregon		–		2	–	1	–	0
Utah		–		3	–	2	–	0
Saint Mary's		–		1	–	1	–	0
Washington		–		2	–	3	–	0
Nevada State		–		1	–	2	–	0
Oregon Agricultural		–		1	–	2	–	0
Utah Agricultural		–		0	–	1	–	0
New Mexico A&M		–		0	–	2	–	0
USC		–		0	–	3	–	0

The 1896 Wyoming Cowboys football team represented the University of Wyoming as an independent during the 1896 college football season. In its third season under head coach Justus F. Soule, a professor of Latin and Greek, the team compiled a perfect 2–0 record, consisting of victories over Colorado State Normal and Denver's Manual High School.

For the third consecutive year, Herbert J. Brees was the team captain. Brees was a native of Laramie, Wyoming who went on to a career in the United States Army. He retired from the Army in 1941 with the rank of lieutenant general. In the program's first three years under coach Soule and captain Brees (1894–1896), the team compiled a 6–0 record and outscored opponents by a total of 128 to 26.

== Schedule ==
Date	Opponent	Site	Result
October 31	at Colorado State Normal	Greeley, CO	W 10–6
November 7	Manual High School	Laramie, WY	W 18–14
