= 1896 Texas A&M Aggies football team =

American college football season

1896 Texas A&M Aggies football
- Conference: Independent
- Record: 2–0–1
- Head coach: Andrew M. Soule & Horace W. South (1st season)

1896 Southern college football independents records
	Conf.			Overall
Team	W	L	T	W		L		T
Centre		–		6	–	0	–	1
Texas A&M		–		2	–	0	–	1
Oklahoma		–		2	–	0	–	0
North Carolina A&M		–		1	–	0	–	0
Virginia		–		7	–	2	–	2
VPI		–		5	–	2	–	1
Navy		–		5	–	3	–	0
Arkansas		–		2	–	1	–	0
Clemson		–		2	–	1	–	0
Columbian		–		2	–	1	–	0
Georgia Tech		–		2	–	2	–	1
Add-Ran		–		1	–	1	–	1
Centenary		–		1	–	1	–	0
VMI		–		3	–	4	–	0
North Carolina		–		3	–	4	–	1
Furman		–		2	–	3	–	0
Ole Miss		–		1	–	2	–	0
West Virginia		–		3	–	7	–	2
South Carolina		–		1	–	3	–	0
Erskine		–		0	–	1	–	0
William & Mary		–		0	–	2	–	0
Davidson		–		0	–	1	–	0
Delaware		–		0	–	6	–	0

The 1896 A&M Aggies football team represented the Agricultural and Mechanical College of Texas—now known as Texas A&M University—as an independent during the 1896 college football season. Led by Andrew M. Soule and Horace W. South in their first and only season as co-head coaches, the Aggies compiled a record of 2–0–1.

== Schedule ==
Date	Time	Opponent	Site	Result	Attendance	Source
November 7	3:30 p.m.	Ball High School	Bryan, TX	T 0–0		
November 26		at Austin	Sherman, TX	W 22–6	1,000	
December 12		Houston High School	Bryan, TX	W 28–0		
