= 1896 VPI football team =

American college football season

1896 VPI football
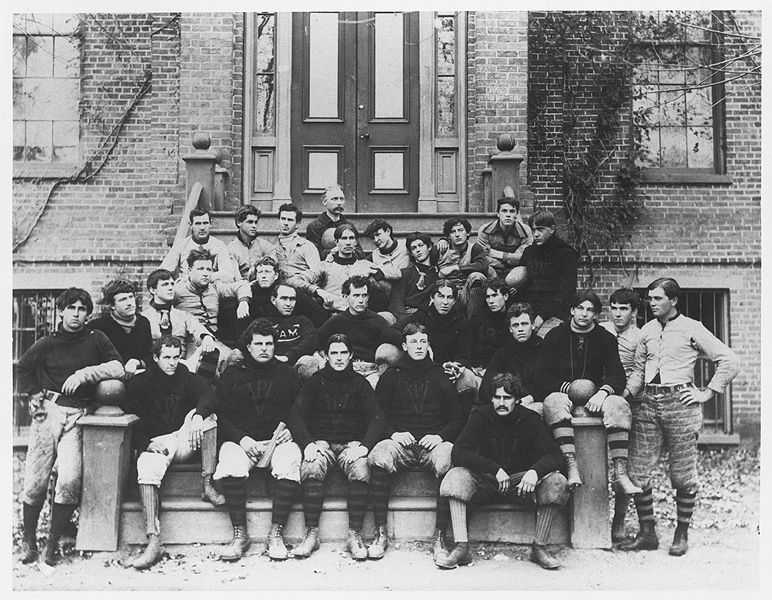
- Conference: Independent
- Record: 5–2–1
- Head coach: Arlie C. Jones (2nd season)
- Captain: J. Lewis Ingles
- Home stadium: Sheib Field

1896 Southern college football independents records
	Conf.			Overall
Team	W	L	T	W		L		T
Centre		–		6	–	0	–	1
Texas A&M		–		2	–	0	–	1
Oklahoma		–		2	–	0	–	0
North Carolina A&M		–		1	–	0	–	0
Virginia		–		7	–	2	–	2
VPI		–		5	–	2	–	1
Navy		–		5	–	3	–	0
Arkansas		–		2	–	1	–	0
Clemson		–		2	–	1	–	0
Columbian		–		2	–	1	–	0
Georgia Tech		–		2	–	2	–	1
Add-Ran		–		1	–	1	–	1
Centenary		–		1	–	1	–	0
VMI		–		3	–	4	–	0
North Carolina		–		3	–	4	–	1
Furman		–		2	–	3	–	0
Ole Miss		–		1	–	2	–	0
West Virginia		–		3	–	7	–	2
South Carolina		–		1	–	3	–	0
Erskine		–		0	–	1	–	0
William & Mary		–		0	–	2	–	0
Davidson		–		0	–	1	–	0
Delaware		–		0	–	6	–	0

The 1896 VPI football team represented Virginia Agricultural and Mechanical College and Polytechnic Institute in the 1896 college football season. The team was led by their head coach Arlie C. Jones and finished with a record of five wins, two losses, and one tie (5–2–1).

== Schedule ==
Date	Time	Opponent	Site	Result	Attendance	Source
October 10		Alleghany Institute	Sheib Field; Blacksburg, VA	W 20-0		
October 20		Roanoke	Sheib Field; Blacksburg, VA	W 12–0		
October 24		vs. North Carolina	Athletic Park (Danville); Danville, VA	T 0–0	600–700	
October 31	4:00 p.m.	at Virginia	Madison Hall Field; Charlottesville, VA (rivalry)	L 0–44	600	
November 2		vs. Hampden–Sydney	Lynchburg, VA	W 42–0		
November 14		at Tennessee	Waite Field; Knoxville, TN	L 4–6		
November 16		vs. Maryville (TN)	Knoxville, TN	W 52–0		
November 26	2:30 p.m.	vs. VMI	Athletic Park; Roanoke, VA (rivalry)	W 24–0	2,000	

== Game summaries ==
=== Alleghany Institute ===
VPI's first game of the season was a victory over the Alleghany Institute at Sheib Field.

=== Cancelled St. Albans Game ===
A game against St. Albans Lutheran Boys School was scheduled to be played on October 17, 1896 in Radford, Virginia. However, the game was not played after a dispute between both teams regarding the amateur eligibility of players on both sides.

=== Roanoke ===
After their victory over Alleghany, VPI played Roanoke College at Sheib Field.

The starting lineup for VPI was: Johnson (left end), Starke (left tackle), Mayer (left guard), Thomas (center), Pelter (right guard), R. Herbert (right tackle), Treadwell (right end), Martin (quarterback), Ingles (left halfback), Eskridge (right halfback), E. Herbert (fullback).

The starting lineup for Roanoke was: M. G. Jones (left end), Bales (left tackle), Terry (left guard), Keister (center), McClintic (right guard), Claiborne (right tackle), Robertson (right end), Hatcher (quarterback), Akard (left halfback), Miller (right halfback), Jones (fullback). The substitutes were: Boyd and Downing.

=== North Carolina ===
North Carolina vs. VPI

Team	1	2	Total
UNC	0	0	0
VPI	0	0	0

- Date: October 24, 1896
- Location: Athletic Park (Danville)
  Danville, VA
- Game attendance: 600–700
- Referee: Mahoun

The starting lineup for VPI was: Johnson (left end), Starke (left tackle), Pelter (left guard), R. Herbert (center), Mayer (right guard), Wood (right tackle), Treadwell (right end), Martin (quarterback), Ingles (left halfback), Eskridge (right halfback), E. Herbert (fullback). The substitutes were: Poindexter.

The starting lineup for North Carolina was: Joel Whitaker (left end), Robert Wright (left tackle), E. L. Neville (left guard), C. C. Joyner (center), James Carson (right guard), Harry Lake (right tackle), Charles Best (right end), Thomas Green (quarterback), Patterson (left halfback), F. J. Haywood (right halfback), Arthur Belden (fullback).

=== Virginia ===
VPI at Virginia

Team	1	2	Total
VPI	0	0	0
• UVA	28	16	44

- Date: October 31, 1896
- Location: Madison Hall Field
  Charlottesville, VA
- Game start: 4:00 p.m.
- Game attendance: 600
- Referee: Fred Harper

The starting lineup for VPI was: Johnson (left end), Starke (left tackle), Mayer (left guard), R. Herbert (center), Pelter (right guard), Wood (right tackle), Treadwell (right end), Martin (quarterback), Ingles (left halfback), Eskridge (right halfback), E. Herbert (fullback). The substitutes were: Smith.

The starting lineup for Virginia was: W. A. Martin (left end), Alexander Moore (left tackle), Johnson (left guard), Gustavus Wallace (center), Eugene Davis (right guard), V. H. Samoskeoy (right tackle), Paul Cocke (right end), Archie Hoxton (quarterback), Virginius Dabney (left halfback), Robert Groner (right halfback), James Morrison (fullback). The substitutes were: Malcolm Griffin.

=== Tennessee ===
VPI at Tennessee

Team	1	2	Total
VPI	4	0	4
• Tenn	0	6	6

- Date: November 14, 1896
- Location: Waite Field
  Knoxville, TN

=== VMI ===
VMI vs. VPI

Team	1	2	Total
VMI	0	0	0
• VPI	18	6	24

- Date: November 26, 1896
- Location: Athletic Park
  Roanoke, VA
- Game start: 2:30 p.m.
- Game attendance: 2,000
- Referee: R. C. Waldon

The starting lineup for VPI was: Johnson (left end), Starke (left tackle), Mayer (left guard), R. Herbert (center), Pelter (right guard), Wood (right tackle), Treadwell (right end), Martin (quarterback), Ingles (left halfback), Eskridge (right halfback), E. Herbert (fullback). The substitutes were: Whitehurst.

The starting lineup for VMI was: Harman (left end), Morrell Mills (left tackle), Rice (left guard), George Marrow (center), Percy Montgomery (right guard), James Harding (right tackle), Elisha McGill (right end), William Montgomery (quarterback), Richard Lawson (left halfback), John Steger (right halfback), Sidney Moore (fullback).

== Players ==
The following players were members of the 1896 football team according to the roster published in the 1897 and 1903 editions of The Bugle, the Virginia Tech yearbook.

VPI 1896 roster
Quarterback: Tarpley Douglas Martin; Guards: William Lawrence Mayer; Nerbon Robert Patrick; Joseph Glenwood Pelter; Tackles: William Edwin Starke; Charles Morton Wood; Centers: Richard Ainsworth Herbert; Sidney Johnson Thomas	Ends: Howard Archer Johnson; William B. Treadwell; Halfbacks: Alexander Parker Eskridge; J. Lewis Ingles (Capt.); K. Harrison; Fullbacks: Edward Henry Herbert; Obediah Francis Whitehurst	Substitutes: Charles Weedon Cochran; William Franklin Cox; George H. King; David Gray Langhorne; Dabney Thomas Poindexter; G. H. Townes; Benjamin Lanier Traynham

== Coaching and training staff ==
- Head coach: Arlie C. Jones
- Manager: Carl Ernest Hardy
- Assistant manager: George S. Merrick
- Medical adviser: W. F. Henderson, MD
