= 1896 Navy Midshipmen football team =

American college football season

1896 Navy Midshipmen football
- Conference: Independent
- Record: 5–3
- Head coach: Johnny Poe (1st season)
- Captain: Joe Powell
- Home stadium: Worden Field

1896 Southern college football independents records
	Conf.			Overall
Team	W	L	T	W		L		T
Centre		–		6	–	0	–	1
Texas A&M		–		2	–	0	–	1
Oklahoma		–		2	–	0	–	0
North Carolina A&M		–		1	–	0	–	0
Virginia		–		7	–	2	–	2
VPI		–		5	–	2	–	1
Navy		–		5	–	3	–	0
Arkansas		–		2	–	1	–	0
Clemson		–		2	–	1	–	0
Columbian		–		2	–	1	–	0
Georgia Tech		–		2	–	2	–	1
Add-Ran		–		1	–	1	–	1
Centenary		–		1	–	1	–	0
VMI		–		3	–	4	–	0
North Carolina		–		3	–	4	–	1
Furman		–		2	–	3	–	0
Ole Miss		–		1	–	2	–	0
West Virginia		–		3	–	7	–	2
South Carolina		–		1	–	3	–	0
Erskine		–		0	–	1	–	0
William & Mary		–		0	–	2	–	0
Davidson		–		0	–	1	–	0
Delaware		–		0	–	6	–	0

The 1896 Navy Midshipmen football team represented the United States Naval Academy during the 1896 college football season. In their first and only season under head coach Johnny Poe, the Midshipmen compiled a 5–3 record and outscored their opponents by a combined score of 180 to 53. The Army–Navy Game was canceled due to Presidential cabinet order.

== Schedule ==
Date	Opponent	Site	Result	Attendance	Source
October 7	Penn	Worden Field; Annapolis, MD	L 0–8		
October 10	Franklin & Marshall	Worden Field; Annapolis, MD	W 49–0		
October 17	St. John's (MD)	Worden Field; Annapolis, MD	W 68–0		
October 24	Penn reserve team	Worden Field; Annapolis, MD	L 0–6		
October 31	Rutgers	Worden Field; Annapolis, MD	W 40–6		
November 7	Lehigh	Worden Field; Annapolis, MD	W 24–10		
November 23	White Squadron	Worden Field; Annapolis, MD	W 11–5		
November 26	Lafayette	Worden Field; Annapolis, MD	L 6–18	1,800	
