= 1896 West Virginia Mountaineers football team =

American college football season

1896 West Virginia Mountaineers football
- Conference: Independent
- Record: 3–7–2
- Head coach: Thomas Trenchard (1st season)
- Captain: George Krebs

1896 Southern college football independents records
	Conf.			Overall
Team	W	L	T	W		L		T
Centre		–		6	–	0	–	1
Texas A&M		–		2	–	0	–	1
Oklahoma		–		2	–	0	–	0
North Carolina A&M		–		1	–	0	–	0
Virginia		–		7	–	2	–	2
VPI		–		5	–	2	–	1
Navy		–		5	–	3	–	0
Arkansas		–		2	–	1	–	0
Clemson		–		2	–	1	–	0
Columbian		–		2	–	1	–	0
Georgia Tech		–		2	–	2	–	1
Add-Ran		–		1	–	1	–	1
Centenary		–		1	–	1	–	0
VMI		–		3	–	4	–	0
North Carolina		–		3	–	4	–	1
Furman		–		2	–	3	–	0
Ole Miss		–		1	–	2	–	0
West Virginia		–		3	–	7	–	2
South Carolina		–		1	–	3	–	0
Erskine		–		0	–	1	–	0
William & Mary		–		0	–	2	–	0
Davidson		–		0	–	1	–	0
Delaware		–		0	–	6	–	0

The 1896 West Virginia Mountaineers football team was an American football team that represented West Virginia University during the 1896 college football season. In its first and only season under head coach Thomas Trenchard, the team compiled a 3–7–2 record and was outscored by a combined total of 101 to 14. Three of the team's losses were to the Lafayette team that has been recognized as the co-national champion for 1896. George Krebs was the team captain.

== Schedule ==
Date	Time	Opponent	Site	Result	Attendance	Source
September 26		Geneva	Morgantown, WV	W 6–0	800	
October 15		vs. Lafayette	Fairmont, WV	L 0–18	1,600	
October 16		vs. Lafayette	Parkersburg, WV	L 0–6		
October 17		vs. Lafayette	Wheeling, WV	L 0–34		
October 24		at Pittsburgh Athletic Club	Pittsburgh, PA	W 4–0		
November 7		at Duquesne Country and Athletic Club	Exposition Park; Allegheny, PA	T 0–0	1,000-2,000+	
November 13		at Latrobe Independents	Latrobe, PA	L 0–5		
November 14		at Latrobe Independents	Latrobe, PA	W 4–0		
November 21	3:35 p.m.	at Duquesne Country and Athletic Club	Exposition Park; Allegheny, PA	L 0–6	1,000–2,500	
November 26 (Note: In an effort to get out of debt, the team arranged two Thanksgiving games, sending its first-stringers to Pittsburgh to play the Pittsburgh Athletic Club and a group of substitutes (along with player-coach Trenchard) to Youngstown to play the Mahoning Cycle Club. WVU counts both games toward its 1896 season record.)		at Pittsburgh Athletic Club	Pittsburgh, PA	T 0–0	4,000	
November 26		at Mahoning Cycle Club	Youngstown, OH	L 0–26	3,000	
November 30		vs. Centre	Charleston, WV	L 0–6		
All times are in Eastern time

== Roster ==
1896 West Virginia Mountaineers football team roster
Players
Coaches
Offense

Pos.	#	Name	Class
End	13	Angus McDonald
End	17	Robert Lynn Osborne
End	18	Lewis Robb
End	21	Buckner Scott
End	26	Thomas G. "Doggy" Trenchard
End	28	Eddie Wood
Tackle	6	Charles Elliott
Tackle	20	William Henry Ryan
Tackle	27	Henry White
Tackle	31	Fielding H. Yost
Guard	10	Philip Konrad
Guard	11	George R. Krebs
Guard	12	George H.A. Kunst
Guard	15	C. Ervin Nethkin
Guard	22	James Smith
Guard	30	Ellis Yost
Center	23	Walter South
Center	24	William Standiford
QB	2	John Brallier
QB	3	William J. Bruner
HB	1	George Anderson
HB	4	Harry O. Cole
HB	5	Howard Crossland
HB	7	Richard Ely
HB	8	Frank Faulkner
HB	14	Frank McGregor
HB	16	James Orr
HB	19	Ralph Rogers
HB	25	Amos Stanley
FB	9	William Holden
FB	29	Louis Yeager

Defense

Pos.	#	Name	Class
DE	13	Angus McDonald
DE	17	Robert Lynn Osborne
DE	18	Lewis Robb
DE	21	Buckner Scott
DE	26	Thomas G. "Doggy" Trenchard
DE	28	Eddie Wood
DT	6	Charles Elliott
DT	20	William Henry Ryan
DT	27	Henry White
DT	31	Fielding H. Yost
DG	10	Philip Konrad
DG	11	George R. Krebs
DG	12	George H.A. Kunst
DG	15	C. Ervin Nethkin
DG	22	James Smith
DG	30	Ellis Yost
NG	23	Walter South
LB	24	William Standiford
LB	9	William Holden
LB	29	Louis Yeager
DB	1	George Anderson
DB	4	Harry O. Cole
DB	5	Howard Crossland
DB	7	Richard Ely
DB	8	Frank Faulkner
DB	14	Frank McGregor
DB	16	James Orr
DB	19	Ralph Rogers
DB	25	Amos Stanley
S	2	John Brallier
S	3	William J. Bruner

Special teams

Pos.	#	Name	Class
P	29	Louis Yeager
K	29	Louis Yeager
KR	1	George Anderson
KR	4	Harry O. Cole
PR	7	Richard Ely
PR	14	Frank McGregor

Head coach

Thomas G. "Doggy" Trenchard

Coordinators/assistant coaches

Legend

- (C) Team captain
- (S) Suspended
- (I) Ineligible
- Injured
- Redshirt
