= 1896 Centenary Gentlemen football team =

American college football season

1896 Centenary Gentlemen football
- Conference: Independent
- Record: 1–1
- Head coach: None

1896 Southern college football independents records
	Conf.			Overall
Team	W	L	T	W		L		T
Centre		–		6	–	0	–	1
Texas A&M		–		2	–	0	–	1
Oklahoma		–		2	–	0	–	0
North Carolina A&M		–		1	–	0	–	0
Virginia		–		7	–	2	–	2
VPI		–		5	–	2	–	1
Navy		–		5	–	3	–	0
Arkansas		–		2	–	1	–	0
Clemson		–		2	–	1	–	0
Columbian		–		2	–	1	–	0
Georgia Tech		–		2	–	2	–	1
Add-Ran		–		1	–	1	–	1
Centenary		–		1	–	1	–	0
VMI		–		3	–	4	–	0
North Carolina		–		3	–	4	–	1
Furman		–		2	–	3	–	0
Ole Miss		–		1	–	2	–	0
West Virginia		–		3	–	7	–	2
South Carolina		–		1	–	3	–	0
Erskine		–		0	–	1	–	0
William & Mary		–		0	–	2	–	0
Davidson		–		0	–	1	–	0
Delaware		–		0	–	6	–	0

The 1896 Centenary Gentlemen football team was an American football team that represented the Centenary College of Louisiana as an independent during the 1896 college football season. In their third year while located at the Jackson, Louisiana campus, the team compiled a 1–1 record.

== Schedule ==
Date	Opponent	Site	Result	Source
October 10	at LSU	State Field; Baton Rouge, LA	L 0–46	
November 7	Tulane	Jackson, LA	No contest	
November 26	Clinton YMCA	Jackson, LA	W 38–0	
