= 1896 University of Utah football team =

American college football season

1896 University of Utah football
- Conference: Independent
- Record: 3–2
- Head coach: C. B. Ferris (1st season)
- Home stadium: University campus

1896 Far West college football independents records
| | Conf. | | | Overall |
| Team | W | L | T | W | | L | | T |
|---|---|---|---|---|---|---|---|---|
| Gonzaga | | – | | 2 | – | 0 | – | 0 |
| Wyoming | | – | | 2 | – | 0 | – | 0 |
| Washington Agricultural | | – | | 2 | – | 0 | – | 1 |
| California | | – | | 6 | – | 2 | – | 2 |
| Stanford | | – | | 2 | – | 1 | – | 1 |
| Oregon | | – | | 2 | – | 1 | – | 0 |
| Utah | | – | | 3 | – | 2 | – | 0 |
| Saint Mary's | | – | | 1 | – | 1 | – | 0 |
| Washington | | – | | 2 | – | 3 | – | 0 |
| Nevada State | | – | | 1 | – | 2 | – | 0 |
| Oregon Agricultural | | – | | 1 | – | 2 | – | 0 |
| Utah Agricultural | | – | | 0 | – | 1 | – | 0 |
| New Mexico A&M | | – | | 0 | – | 2 | – | 0 |
| USC | | – | | 0 | – | 3 | – | 0 |

The 1896 University of Utah football team was an American football team that represented the University of Utah as an independent during the 1896 college football season. Led by C. B. Ferris in his first and only season as head coach, the team compiled a record of 3–2.

== Schedule ==
| Date | Opponent | Site | Result | Attendance | Source |
|---|---|---|---|---|---|
| April 6 | Brigham Young Academy | University campus; Salt Lake City, UT (Holy War) | W 12–4 | 800 | |
| November 14 | Brigham Young Academy | University campus; Salt Lake City, UT | W 6–0 | 700 | |
| November 26 | Salt Lake City Crescents | University campus; Salt Lake City, UT | L 0–4 | | |
| December 5 | at Brigham Young Academy | Provo, UT | L 6–8 | | |
| December 25 | Salt Lake City High School | University campus; Salt Lake City, UT | W 6–4 | 200 | |
