= 1896 William & Mary Orange and White football team =

American college football season

1896 William & Mary Orange and White football
- Conference: Independent
- Record: 0–2
- Head coach: Bill Armstrong (1st season)
- Captain: Ralph Leigh

1896 Southern college football independents records
	Conf.			Overall
Team	W	L	T	W		L		T
Centre		–		6	–	0	–	1
Texas A&M		–		2	–	0	–	1
Oklahoma		–		2	–	0	–	0
North Carolina A&M		–		1	–	0	–	0
Virginia		–		7	–	2	–	2
VPI		–		5	–	2	–	1
Navy		–		5	–	3	–	0
Arkansas		–		2	–	1	–	0
Clemson		–		2	–	1	–	0
Columbian		–		2	–	1	–	0
Georgia Tech		–		2	–	2	–	1
Add-Ran		–		1	–	1	–	1
Centenary		–		1	–	1	–	0
VMI		–		3	–	4	–	0
North Carolina		–		3	–	4	–	1
Furman		–		2	–	3	–	0
Ole Miss		–		1	–	2	–	0
West Virginia		–		3	–	7	–	2
South Carolina		–		1	–	3	–	0
Erskine		–		0	–	1	–	0
William & Mary		–		0	–	2	–	0
Davidson		–		0	–	1	–	0
Delaware		–		0	–	6	–	0

The 1896 William & Mary Orange and White football team represented the College of William & Mary during the 1896 college football season. The team played just two games, both against Randolph–Macon, and lost both.

== Schedule ==
Date	Opponent	Site	Result
October 31	Randolph–Macon	Williamsburg, VA	L 0–10
November 16	at Randolph–Macon	Ashland, VA	L 0–4
