= 1896 Stanford football team =

American college football season

1896 Stanford football
- Conference: Independent
- Record: 2–1–1
- Head coach: Harry P. Cross (1st season)

1896 Far West college football independents records
	Conf.			Overall
Team	W	L	T	W		L		T
Gonzaga		–		2	–	0	–	0
Wyoming		–		2	–	0	–	0
Washington Agricultural		–		2	–	0	–	1
California		–		6	–	2	–	2
Stanford		–		2	–	1	–	1
Oregon		–		2	–	1	–	0
Utah		–		3	–	2	–	0
Saint Mary's		–		1	–	1	–	0
Washington		–		2	–	3	–	0
Nevada State		–		1	–	2	–	0
Oregon Agricultural		–		1	–	2	–	0
Utah Agricultural		–		0	–	1	–	0
New Mexico A&M		–		0	–	2	–	0
USC		–		0	–	3	–	0

The 1896 Stanford football team represented Stanford University in the 1896 college football season and was coached by Harry P. Cross in the first of his two nonconsecutive seasons with the team. He returned to coach again in 1898. Like the two coaches who preceded him, Cross played football at Yale.

== Schedule ==
Date	Time	Opponent	Site	Result	Attendance	Source
October 10	2:30 p.m.	vs. Olympic Club	Central Park; San Francisco, CA	T 0–0		
October 24		vs. Reliance Athletic Club	Central Park; San Francisco, CA	W 10–0		
October 31		vs. Olympic Club	Central Park; San Francisco, CA	L 0–4		
November 26	2:45 p.m.	vs. California	Central Park; San Francisco, CA (rivalry)	W 20–0	12,000–20,000	
