= 1896 Add-Ran Christian football team =

American college football season

1896 Add-Ran Christian football
- Conference: Independent
- Record: 1–1–1
- Head coach: None

1896 Southern college football independents records
	Conf.			Overall
Team	W	L	T	W		L		T
Centre		–		6	–	0	–	1
Texas A&M		–		2	–	0	–	1
Oklahoma		–		2	–	0	–	0
North Carolina A&M		–		1	–	0	–	0
Virginia		–		7	–	2	–	2
VPI		–		5	–	2	–	1
Navy		–		5	–	3	–	0
Arkansas		–		2	–	1	–	0
Clemson		–		2	–	1	–	0
Columbian		–		2	–	1	–	0
Georgia Tech		–		2	–	2	–	1
Add-Ran		–		1	–	1	–	1
Centenary		–		1	–	1	–	0
VMI		–		3	–	4	–	0
North Carolina		–		3	–	4	–	1
Furman		–		2	–	3	–	0
Ole Miss		–		1	–	2	–	0
West Virginia		–		3	–	7	–	2
South Carolina		–		1	–	3	–	0
Erskine		–		0	–	1	–	0
William & Mary		–		0	–	2	–	0
Davidson		–		0	–	1	–	0
Delaware		–		0	–	6	–	0

The 1896 Add-Ran Christian football team represented Add-Ran Christian University—now known as Texas Christian University (TCU)—as an independent during the 1896 college football season. They played their home games in Waco, Texas.

== Schedule ==
Date	Opponent	Site	Result	Source
November 28	Toby's Business College	Waco, TX	W 8–6	
December 19	at Houston Heavyweights	Houston Baseball Park; Houston, TX	L 0–22	
February 22, 1897	Houston Heavyweights	Padgitt's Park; Waco, TX	T 0–0	
