= 1896 California Golden Bears football team =

American college football season

1896 California Golden Bears football
- Conference: Independent
- Record: 6–2–2
- Head coach: Frank Butterworth (2nd season)
- Captain: A. W. Ransome

1896 Far West college football independents records
	Conf.			Overall
Team	W	L	T	W		L		T
Gonzaga		–		2	–	0	–	0
Wyoming		–		2	–	0	–	0
Washington Agricultural		–		2	–	0	–	1
California		–		6	–	2	–	2
Stanford		–		2	–	1	–	1
Oregon		–		2	–	1	–	0
Utah		–		3	–	2	–	0
Saint Mary's		–		1	–	1	–	0
Washington		–		2	–	3	–	0
Nevada State		–		1	–	2	–	0
Oregon Agricultural		–		1	–	2	–	0
Utah Agricultural		–		0	–	1	–	0
New Mexico A&M		–		0	–	2	–	0
USC		–		0	–	3	–	0

The 1896 California Golden Bears football team was an American football team that represented the University of California, Berkeley during the 1896 college football season. The team competed as an independent under head coach Frank Butterworth and compiled a record of 6–2–2.

== Schedule ==
Date	Time	Opponent	Site	Result	Attendance	Source
October 3		vs. Reliance Athletic Club	Central Park; San Francisco, CA	L 2–12		
October 6		vs. Olympic Club	Central Park; San Francisco, CA	T 0–0		
October 10		vs. Reliance Athletic Club	Central Park; San Francisco, CA	T 0–0		
October 17		vs. Olympic Club	Central Park; San Francisco, CA	W 24–8		
November 3		vs. Reliance Athletic Club	Central Park; San Francisco, CA	W 16–10		
November 26	2:45 p.m.	vs. Stanford	Central Park; San Francisco, CA (Big Game)	L 0–20	12,000–20,000	
December 25		at Los Angeles Athletic Club	Los Angeles, CA	W 14–0		
December 29		at Redlands High	Redlands High School; Redlands, CA	W 32–0		
December 31		at San Diego High	San Diego High School; San Diego, CA	W 52–0		
January 1, 1897		at Whittier	Whittier, CA	W 10–0		
