= 1896 Washington Agricultural football team =

American college football season

1896 Washington Agricultural football
- Conference: Independent
- Record: 2–0–1
- Head coach: David A. Brodie (1st season)
- Captain: Milton McCroskey
- Home stadium: Soldier Field

1896 Far West college football independents records
	Conf.			Overall
Team	W	L	T	W		L		T
Gonzaga		–		2	–	0	–	0
Wyoming		–		2	–	0	–	0
Washington Agricultural		–		2	–	0	–	1
California		–		6	–	2	–	2
Stanford		–		2	–	1	–	1
Oregon		–		2	–	1	–	0
Utah		–		3	–	2	–	0
Saint Mary's		–		1	–	1	–	0
Washington		–		2	–	3	–	0
Nevada State		–		1	–	2	–	0
Oregon Agricultural		–		1	–	2	–	0
Utah Agricultural		–		0	–	1	–	0
New Mexico A&M		–		0	–	2	–	0
USC		–		0	–	3	–	0

The 1896 Washington Agricultural football team was an American football team that represented Washington Agricultural College during the 1896 college football season. The team competed as an independent under head coach David A. Brodie and compiled a record of 2–0–1.

== Background history ==
The first steps to organize a football team for the 1896 at the Washington State Agricultural College were taken in the last days of September. Open practices were organized, with team selection to be made by a committee of the school's athletic association. Challenges were received from the University of Washington at Seattle as well as Iowa State College, the latter of which was attempting to organize a West Coast tour for early December.

"Several of the old players have not returned, but a number of other old players from other schools are here and will keep up the average of the team," a special report from Pullman published in the Seattle Post-Intelligencer noted.

== Schedule ==
Date	Time	Opponent	Site	Result	Attendance	Source
November 14		Lewiston AA	Soldier Field; Pullman, WA	W 24–0		
November 26		vs. Company C, NGW	Colfax, WA	W 22–0	300	
November 28		Idaho	Moscow, Idaho (rivalry)	Cancelled		
December 5	2:30 p.m.	at Lewiston AA	Lewiston, ID	T 6–6		
