= 1896 Furman Baptists football team =

American college football season

1896 Furman Baptists football
- Conference: Independent
- Record: 2–3
- Head coach: Frank Sims (1st season)

1896 Southern college football independents records
	Conf.			Overall
Team	W	L	T	W		L		T
Centre		–		6	–	0	–	1
Texas A&M		–		2	–	0	–	1
Oklahoma		–		2	–	0	–	0
North Carolina A&M		–		1	–	0	–	0
Virginia		–		7	–	2	–	2
VPI		–		5	–	2	–	1
Navy		–		5	–	3	–	0
Arkansas		–		2	–	1	–	0
Clemson		–		2	–	1	–	0
Columbian		–		2	–	1	–	0
Georgia Tech		–		2	–	2	–	1
Add-Ran		–		1	–	1	–	1
Centenary		–		1	–	1	–	0
VMI		–		3	–	4	–	0
North Carolina		–		3	–	4	–	1
Furman		–		2	–	3	–	0
Ole Miss		–		1	–	2	–	0
West Virginia		–		3	–	7	–	2
South Carolina		–		1	–	3	–	0
Erskine		–		0	–	1	–	0
William & Mary		–		0	–	2	–	0
Davidson		–		0	–	1	–	0
Delaware		–		0	–	6	–	0

The 1896 Furman Baptists football team represented Furman University as an independent during the 1896 college football season. Led by Frank Sims in his first and only season as head coach, Furman compiled a record of 2–3.

== Schedule ==
Date	Opponent	Site	Result	Source
October 23	at Bingham Military School	Allandale Field; Asheville, NC	L 0–12	
October 31	Clemson	Greenville, SC	L 6–14	
November 6	at Wofford	Spartanburg, SC (rivalry)	L 0–6	
November 13	Charleston YMCA		W 10–0	
November 26	South Carolina	Greenville, SC	W 12–0	
