= 1896 Centre football team =

American college football season

1896 Centre football

State champion
- Conference: Independent
- Record: 6–0–1
- Head coach: Harry Anderson (1st season)

1896 Southern college football independents records
	Conf.			Overall
Team	W	L	T	W		L		T
Centre		–		6	–	0	–	1
Texas A&M		–		2	–	0	–	1
Oklahoma		–		2	–	0	–	0
North Carolina A&M		–		1	–	0	–	0
Virginia		–		7	–	2	–	2
VPI		–		5	–	2	–	1
Navy		–		5	–	3	–	0
Arkansas		–		2	–	1	–	0
Clemson		–		2	–	1	–	0
Columbian		–		2	–	1	–	0
Georgia Tech		–		2	–	2	–	1
Add-Ran		–		1	–	1	–	1
Centenary		–		1	–	1	–	0
VMI		–		3	–	4	–	0
North Carolina		–		3	–	4	–	1
Furman		–		2	–	3	–	0
Ole Miss		–		1	–	2	–	0
West Virginia		–		3	–	7	–	2
South Carolina		–		1	–	3	–	0
Erskine		–		0	–	1	–	0
William & Mary		–		0	–	2	–	0
Davidson		–		0	–	1	–	0
Delaware		–		0	–	6	–	0

The 1896 Centre football team represented Centre College as an independent the 1896 college football season. Led by first-year head coach Harry Anderson, Centre compiled a record of 6–0–1. The team outscored its opponents 184–18.

== Schedule ==
Date	Opponent	Site	Result	Attendance	Source
October 17	Vanderbilt	Danville, KY	W 46–0		
October 24	at Louisville Athletic Club	Louisville, KY	W 16–6		
October 31	Kentucky State College	Danville, KY (rivalry)	W 32–0		
November 5	Louisville Athletic Club	Danville, KY	W 28–0		
November 14	at Kentucky State College	Lexington, KY	W 44–0		
November 26	at Cincinnati	League Park; Cincinnati, OH	T 12–12	6,000	
November 30	vs. West Virginia	Charleston, WV	W 6–0		
