= Central City Park Bandstand =

- U.S. National Register of Historic Places
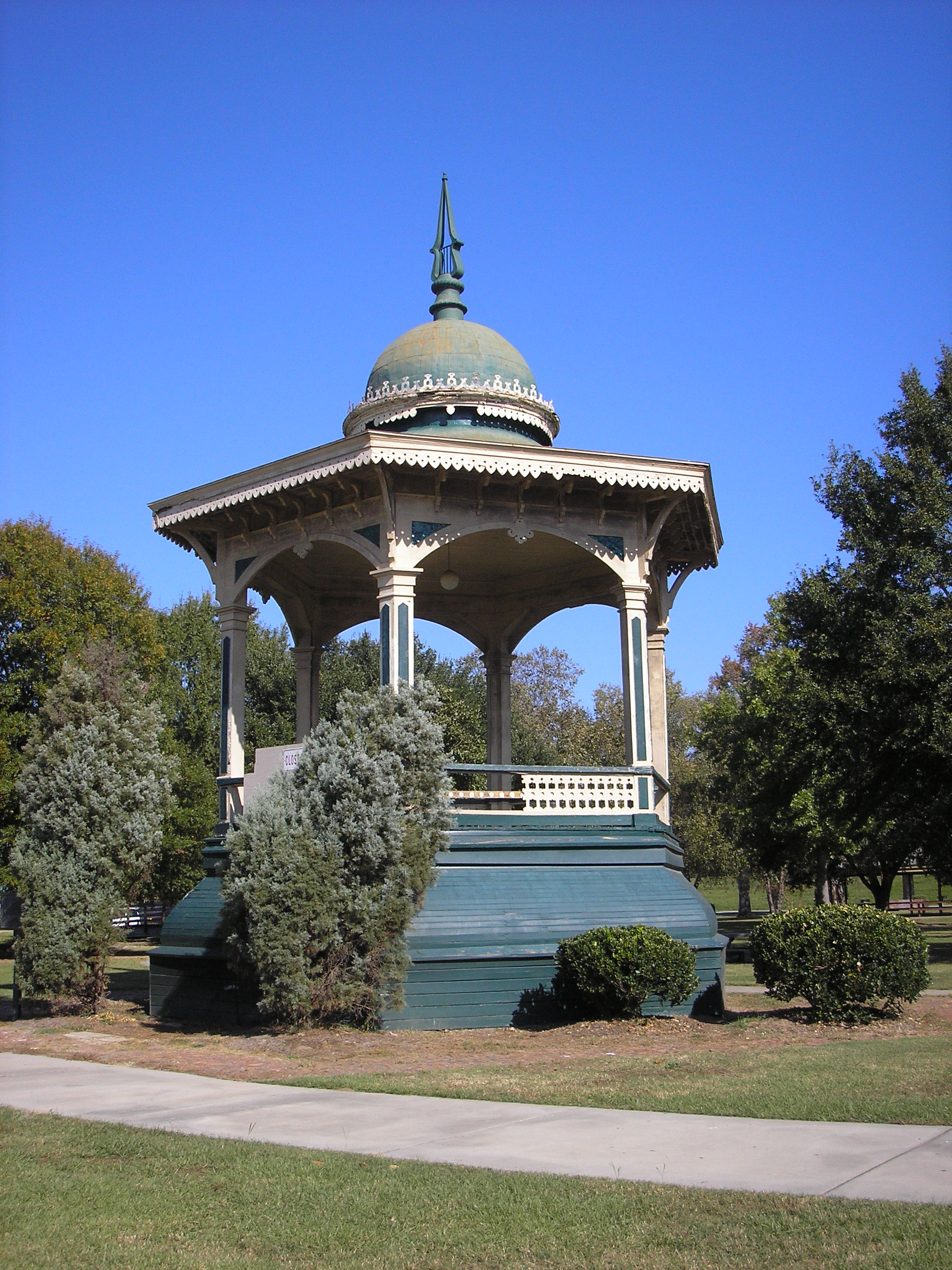
- The bandstand in 2012
- Location: Central City Park, Macon, Georgia
- Coordinates: 32°49′59″N 83°36′55″W
- Area: less than one acre
- Built: 1871
- Architectural style: Late Victorian, "Saracenic style"
- NRHP reference No.: 72000361
- Added to NRHP: March 16, 1972

The Central City Park Bandstand is a hexagonal bandstand in Central City Park in Macon, Georgia that was built in 1871. It was listed on the National Register of Historic Places on March 16, 1972. The bandstand is located at the eastern terminus of Riverside Drive in Central City Park.

It has been noted to be similar to the top of the iconic octagonal house Longwood (also known as Nutt's Folly) in Natchez, Mississippi.

== See also ==
- National Register of Historic Places listings in Bibb County, Georgia
