= 1896 VMI Keydets football team =

American college football season

1896 VMI Keydets football
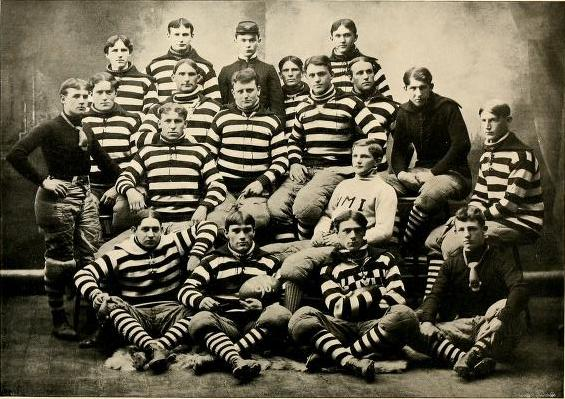
- Conference: Independent
- Record: 3–4
- Head coach: George W. Bryant (2nd season)

1896 Southern college football independents records
	Conf.			Overall
Team	W	L	T	W		L		T
Centre		–		6	–	0	–	1
Texas A&M		–		2	–	0	–	1
Oklahoma		–		2	–	0	–	0
North Carolina A&M		–		1	–	0	–	0
Virginia		–		7	–	2	–	2
VPI		–		5	–	2	–	1
Navy		–		5	–	3	–	0
Arkansas		–		2	–	1	–	0
Clemson		–		2	–	1	–	0
Columbian		–		2	–	1	–	0
Georgia Tech		–		2	–	2	–	1
Add-Ran		–		1	–	1	–	1
Centenary		–		1	–	1	–	0
VMI		–		3	–	4	–	0
North Carolina		–		3	–	4	–	1
Furman		–		2	–	3	–	0
Ole Miss		–		1	–	2	–	0
West Virginia		–		3	–	7	–	2
South Carolina		–		1	–	3	–	0
Erskine		–		0	–	1	–	0
William & Mary		–		0	–	2	–	0
Davidson		–		0	–	1	–	0
Delaware		–		0	–	6	–	0

The 1896 VMI Keydets football team represented the Virginia Military Institute (VMI) in their sixth season of organized football. The Keydets had a 3–4 record, marking the first losing season in program history.

== Schedule ==
Date	Time	Opponent	Site	Result	Attendance	Source
Unknown		Washington and Lee	Unknown; Lexington, VA	W 12–0		
October 31		St. John's (MD)	Unknown; Lexington, VA	W 14–0		
November 7		Allegheny Institute	Unknown; Lexington, VA	W 42–0		
November 11		vs. Virginia	Unknown; Lynchburg, VA	L 0–46		
November 18		St. Alban's	Unknown; Lexington, VA	L 0–22		
November 21		at Washington and Lee	Unknown; Lexington, VA	L 0–6		
November 26	2:30pm	vs. VPI	Unknown; Roanoke, VA (rivalry)	L 0–24	2,000	
