= Highland, Virginia =

Unincorporated community in Virginia, US

Coordinates: 37°09′53″N 80°40′43″W

Highland is an unincorporated community in Pulaski County, in the U.S. state of Virginia.
