= Jack Lindsay (sportsperson) =

American college football player

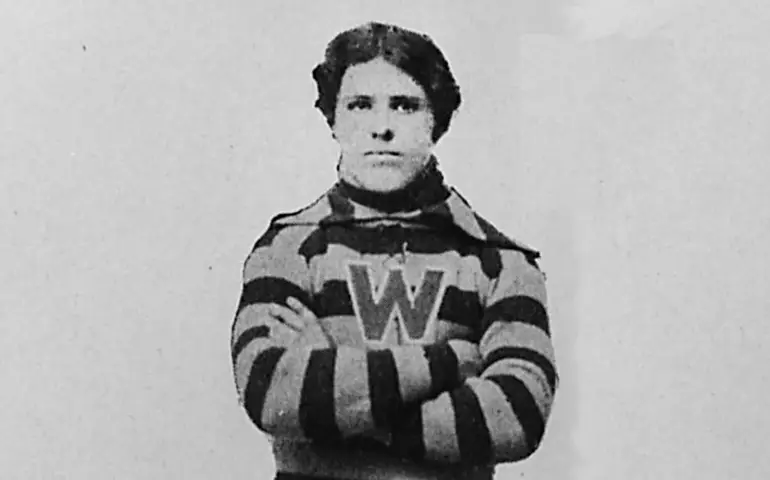

Washington Huskies
- Position: Halfback

Personal information
- Died: May 22, 1898

Career information
- High school: Everett High School

John J. Lindsay was an American college football and basketball player for the Washington Huskies.

Lindsay was among the 34 drowned in the May 22, 1898 sinking of the schooner Jane Gray, traveling from Seattle to the gold fields at Kotzebue Sound.
