= List of baseball parks in Atlanta =

This is a list of venues used for professional baseball in Atlanta, Georgia. The information is a compilation of the information contained in the references listed.

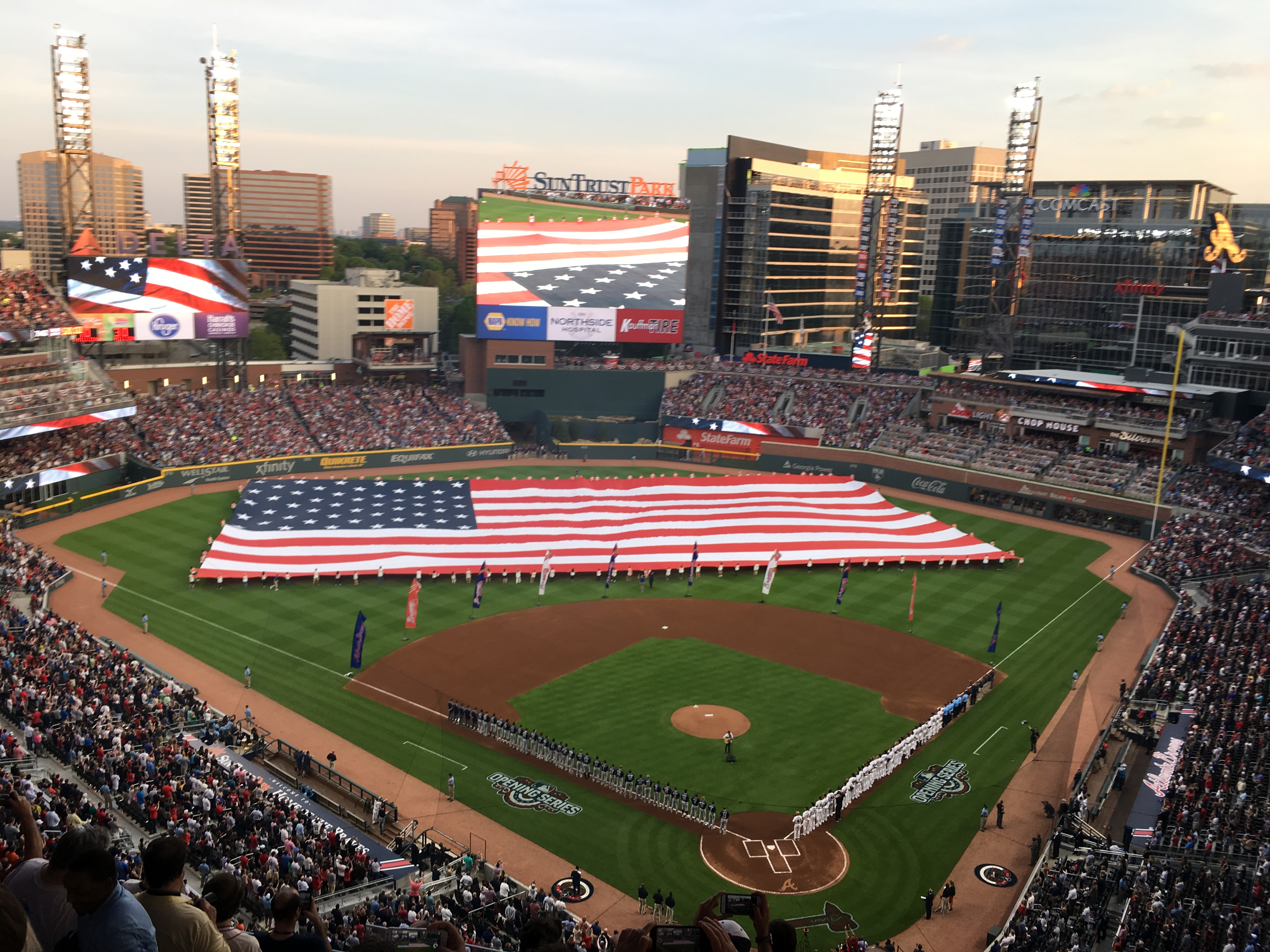
SunTrust Park, 2017

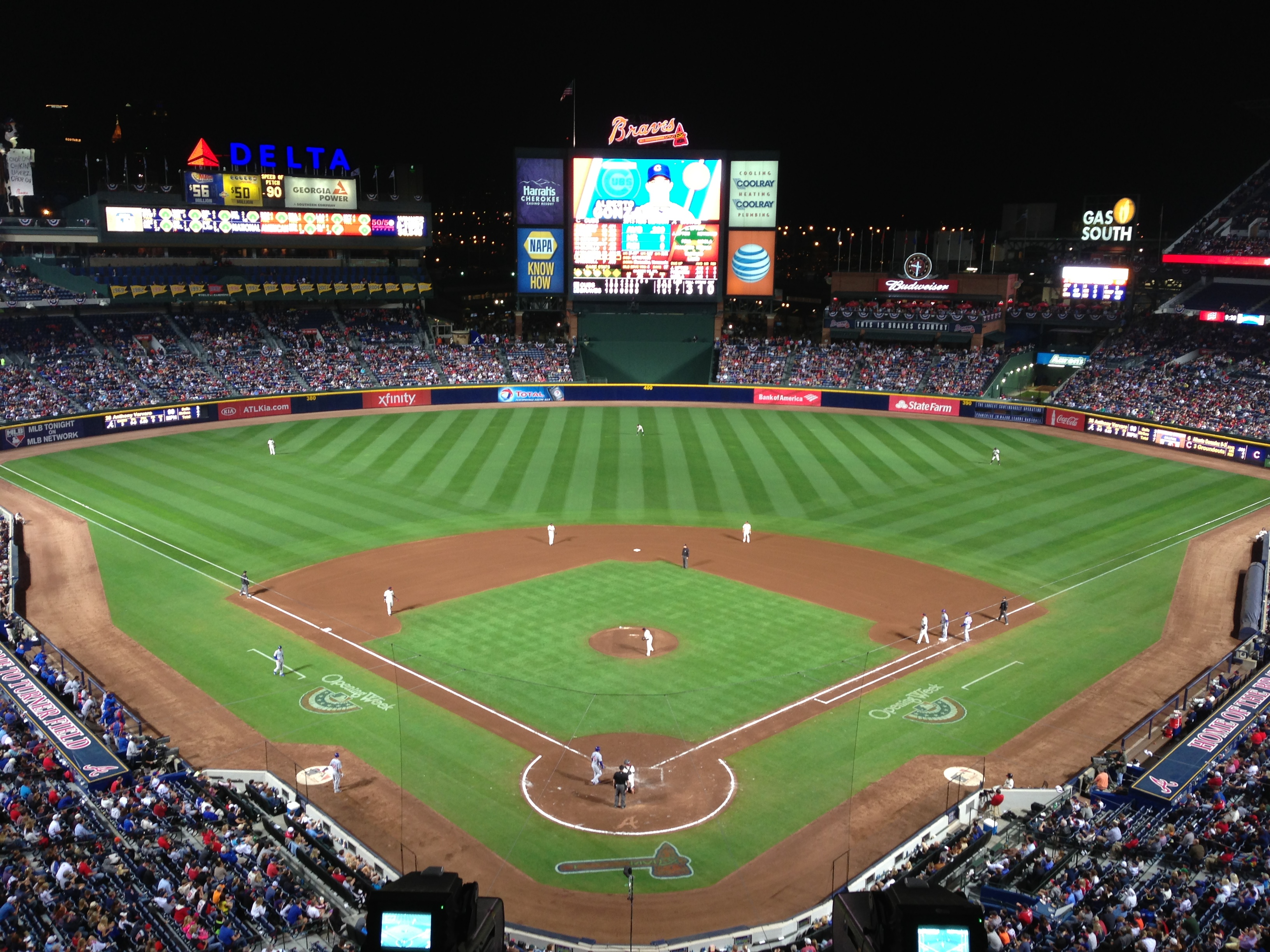
Turner Field, 2013

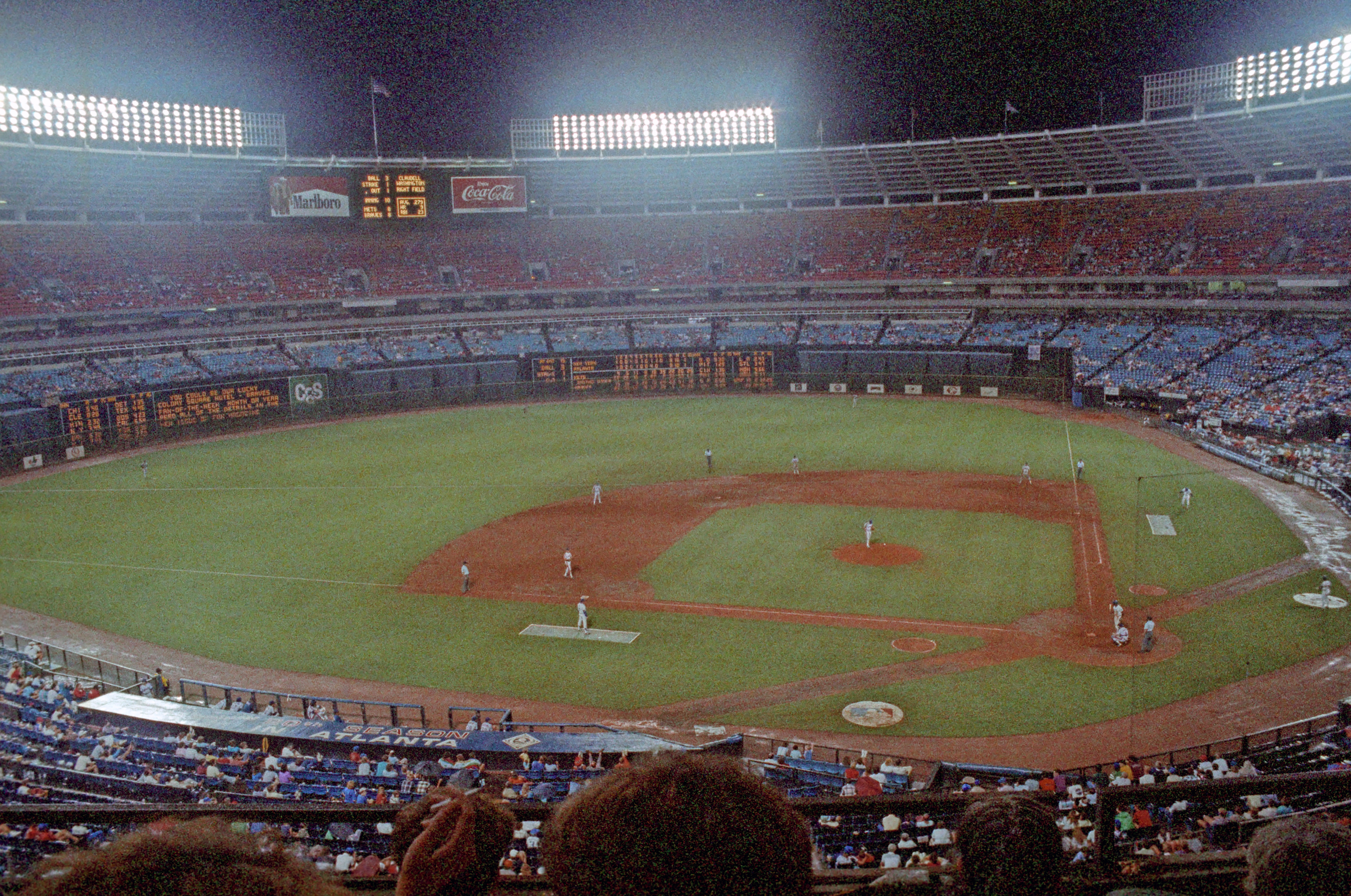
Atlanta–Fulton County Stadium, 1985

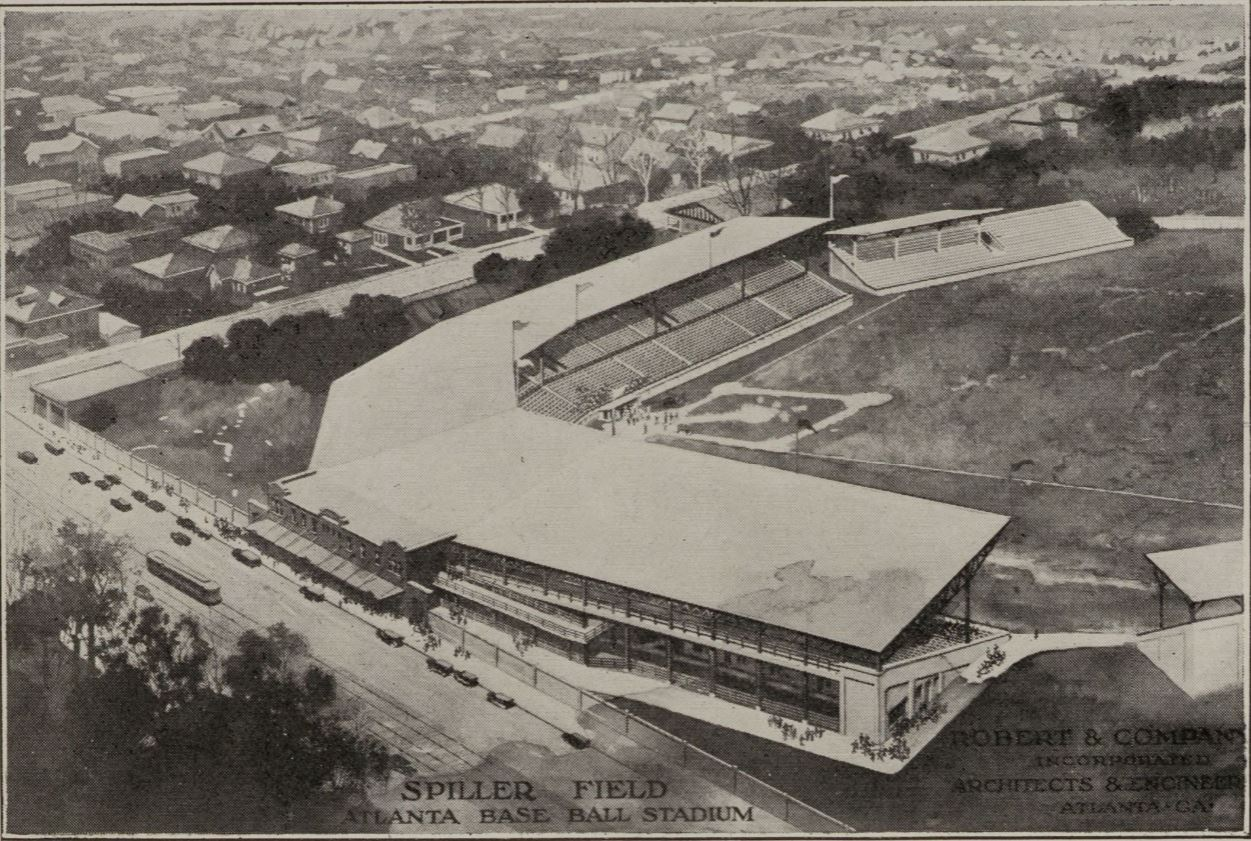
Spiller Field, 1924

Piedmont Park ball field, 1902

Peters Park or Athletic Park (I)
Home of: Atlanta, Southern League (1885–mid-1886) (1888–1889 part season)
Location: West Peachtree Street Northwest (east); North Avenue Northeast (south); per 1886 Atlanta city directory

Was to have been a part of the Peters Park (Atlanta) subdivision; developer Richard Peters also owned the ball club.

Currently: churches and small businesses; close to the future site of Bobby Dodd Stadium.

Brisbine Park
Home of: Atlanta Crackers, Southern League (1892–1893, 1896–1898); some sources say Southeastern League for (1896-1897)
Location: Crumley Street Southwest (north, third base); Glenn Street Southwest (south, right field); Ira Street Southwest (west, first base); Windsor Street Southwest (east, left field); about six blocks west of the future site of Atlanta–Fulton County Stadium
Currently: vacant lot adjacent to Rosa L. Burney Park - public park

Show Grounds aka Athletic Park (II)
Home of: Atlanta Crackers - Southern League (1894–1895) (1896 some games)
Location: Jackson Street Northeast (west); Irwin Street Northeast (north); Boulevard Northeast (east); Old Wheat Street Northeast (south)
Currently: Martin Luther King Jr. Historic Site

Piedmont Park
Home of: Atlanta Crackers, Southern Association (1902–1906)
Location: Piedmont Avenue Northeast (west/north); 10th Street Northeast (south); Monroe Drive Northeast (east)
Previously: site of 1895 Cotton States and International Exposition
Currently: Near the 12th Street entryway; the former race track still exists as a walking path.

Ponce de Leon Park a.k.a. Spiller Park / Spiller Field (1924–1932)
Home of:

Atlanta Crackers, Southern Association (1907–1961)
Atlanta Black Crackers, Negro leagues (1920s)
Atlanta Black Crackers, Negro American League (1938)
Atlanta Crackers, International League (1962–1964)

Location: 650 Ponce de Leon Avenue Northeast (south, first base); Lakeview Avenue Northeast (west, third base); Southern Railroad (east/northeast, right/center field)
Currently: Midtown Place shopping center

Atlanta–Fulton County Stadium a.k.a. Fulton County Stadium a.k.a. Atlanta Stadium
Home of:

Atlanta Crackers, IL (1965 only)
Atlanta Braves, NL (1966–1996)

Location: 521 Capitol Avenue Southeast / Hank Aaron Drive Southwest (right/center field); parking and Fulton Street Southwest (north, left field); Washington Street Southwest / Pollard Boulevard Southwest (west, third base / home plate); Georgia Avenue Southwest (south, first base)
Currently: parking lot for Turner Field / Center Parc Stadium
Future: to be site of Georgia State University baseball park

Turner Field reconfigured from Centennial Olympic Stadium
Home of: Atlanta Braves, NL (1997–2016)
Location: 755 Hank Aaron Drive Southeast (a.k.a. Capitol Avenue Southeast - right field); Georgia Avenue Southwest (north, left field); Pollard Boulevard Southwest / Washington Street Southwest (west, third base); Bill Lucas Drive Southwest (south, first base); across Georgia Avenue to the south from Atlanta Stadium
Previously: parking lot for Atlanta Stadium
Currently: reconfigured as a football venue now known as Center Parc Stadium

Truist Park
Home of: Atlanta Braves, NL (2017–present)
Location: Cumberland, Georgia, a suburb northwest of Atlanta. Ballpark is west of the interchange of I-75 and I-285. Local streets are Circle 75 Parkway (southeast and northeast, outfield and third base); Windy Ridge Parkway (northwest and southwest, home plate and first base); and Heritage Court (southwest - right field). Changed names on January 14, 2020. Formerly titled SunTrust Park prior to the merger title sponsor SunTrust and BB&T.

== See also ==
- Lists of baseball parks
