= 1897 Southern Intercollegiate Athletic Association football season =

- League: NCAA
- Sport: College football
- Duration: October 2, 1897 through January 8, 1898
- Teams: 16

Regular Season
- Season champions: Vanderbilt

Football seasons
- ← 1896 1898 →

1897 Southern Intercollegiate Athletic Association football standings
| | Conf. | | | | | Overall |
| Team | W | | L | | T | W | | L | | T |
|---|---|---|---|---|---|---|---|---|---|---|
| Vanderbilt $ | 3 | – | 0 | – | 0 | 6 | – | 0 | – | 1 |
| Georgia | 2 | – | 0 | – | 0 | 2 | – | 1 | – | 0 |
| Auburn | 2 | – | 0 | – | 1 | 2 | – | 0 | – | 1 |
| Central (KY) | 1 | – | 1 | – | 0 | 1 | – | 2 | – | 0 |
| Nashville | 1 | – | 1 | – | 0 | 1 | – | 1 | – | 0 |
| Alabama | 0 | – | 0 | – | 0 | 1 | – | 0 | – | 0 |
| Tennessee | 0 | – | 0 | – | 0 | 4 | – | 1 | – | 1 |
| Texas | 0 | – | 0 | – | 0 | 6 | – | 2 | – | 0 |
| LSU | 0 | – | 0 | – | 0 | 1 | – | 1 | – | 0 |
| Sewanee | 1 | – | 2 | – | 1 | 1 | – | 3 | – | 1 |
| Clemson | 0 | – | 1 | – | 0 | 2 | – | 2 | – | 0 |
| Mercer | 0 | – | 1 | – | 0 | 0 | – | 2 | – | 1 |
| Cumberland (TN) | 0 | – | 1 | – | 0 | 0 | – | 1 | – | 0 |
| Kentucky State College | 0 | – | 2 | – | 0 | 2 | – | 4 | – | 0 |
| SW Presbyterian | 0 | – | 0 | – | 0 | 0 | – | 0 | – | 0 |
$ – Conference champion

The 1897 Southern Intercollegiate Athletic Association football season was the college football games played by the members schools of the Southern Intercollegiate Athletic Association as part of the 1897 college football season

The season began on October 2. Conference play began on October 9 with Georgia shutting out Clemson 24–0 in Athens.

After the Sewanee game, Coach R. G. Acton's Vanderbilt Commodores claimed the program's first ever conference title. This was followed by a challenge met by the other southern team to claim a championship, South Atlantic school Virginia; which claims seven prior championships of the South. The game ended a 0–0 tie. Said Coach Acton, "It was the best game ever played in the South." Vanderbilt held all opponents scoreless.

The Texas Longhorns averaged the most points per game in the conference.

The 1897 season was one in which a member school, Tulane University, was barred from intercollegiate football participation by SIAA President, Dr. Dudley. This was part of a sanction handed down in response to the LSU game the previous season in which Tulane was forced to forfeit for having fielded an ineligible player.

The season was also notable for the game Virginia played against Georgia, featuring the death of Richard Von Albade Gammon.

== Season overview ==
=== Results and team statistics ===
| Conf. Rank | Team | Head coach | Overall record | Conf. record | PPG | PAG |
|---|---|---|---|---|---|---|
| 1 | Vanderbilt | R. G. Acton | 6–0–1 | 3–0 | 19.9 | **0.0** |
| 2 | Georgia | Charles McCarthy | 2–1 | 2–0 | 18.7 | 5.7 |
| 3 | Auburn | John Heisman | 2–0–1 | 2–0–1 | 13.3 | 1.3 |
| 4 | Tennessee | | 4–1 | 1–0 | 12.8 | 3.2 |
| 5 (tie) | Central | H. McC. Anderson | 1–1 | 1–1 | | |
| 5 (tie) | Nashville | | 1–1 | 1–1 | | |
| 5 (tie) | Alabama | Allen McCants | 1–0 | 0–0 | 6.0 | **0.0** |
| 5 (tie) | Texas | Walter F. Kelly | 6–2 | 0–0 | **20.5** | 4.5 |
| 5 (tie) | LSU | Allen Jeardeau | 1–1 | 0–0 | 14.0 | 16.0 |
| 10 | Sewanee | J. G. Jayne | 1–3–1 | 1–2–1 | 3.0 | 5.6 |
| 11 (tie) | Clemson | William M. Williams | 2–2 | 0–1 | 7.0 | 14.5 |
| 11 (tie) | Cumberland | | 0–1 | 0–1 | | |
| 11 (tie) | Georgia Tech | J. B. Wood | 0–1 | 0–1 | 0.0 | 28.0 |
| 11 (tie) | Mercer | Gordon Saussy | 0–1–1 | 0–1 | 0.0 | 13.0 |
| 15 | Kentucky State | Lyman B. Eaton | 2–4 | 0–2 | 4.7 | 19.7 |
| ? | Southwestern Presbyterian | | | | | |

Key

PPG = Average of points scored per game
PAG = Average of points allowed per game

=== Regular season ===
Index to colors and formatting
Non-conference matchup; SIAA member won
Non-conference matchup; SIAA member lost
Non-conference matchup; tie
Conference matchup

SIAA teams in bold.

==== Week One ====
| Date | Visiting team | Home team | Site | Result | Attendance | Reference |
|---|---|---|---|---|---|---|
| October 2 | Kentucky University | **Kentucky State** | Lexington, KY | **W** 8–6 | | |

==== Week Two ====
| Date | Visiting team | Home team | Site | Result | Attendance | Reference |
|---|---|---|---|---|---|---|
| October 9 | Kentucky University | **Vanderbilt** | Dudley Field • Nashville, TN | **W** 22–0 | | |
| October 9 | **Clemson** | **Georgia** | Herty Field • Athens, GA | **UGA** 24–0 | | |
| October 11 | **Kentucky State** | Kentucky Wesleyan | Winchester, KY | **L** 0–4 | | |
| October 15 | King (TN) | **Tennessee** | Baldwin Park • Knoxville, TN | **W** 28–0 | | |

==== Week Three ====
| Date | Visiting team | Home team | Site | Result | Attendance | Reference |
|---|---|---|---|---|---|---|
| October 16 | **Mercer** | Gordon Institute | Barnesville, GA | **T** 0–0 | | |
| October 16 | **Sewanee** | **Nashville** | Nashville, TN | **NASH** 6–5 | | |
| October 18 | **Central (KY)** | **Sewanee** | Hardee Field • Sewanee, TN | **SEW** 4–0 | | |

==== Week Four ====
| Date | Visiting team | Home team | Site | Result | Attendance | Reference |
|---|---|---|---|---|---|---|
| October 23 | San Antonio | **Texas** | Varsity Athletic Field • Austin, TX | **W** 10–0 | | |
| October 23 | Georgia Tech | **Georgia** | Herty Field • Athens, GA | **W** 24–0 | 600 | |
| October 23 | **Auburn** | **Mercer** | Central City Park • Macon, GA | **AUB** 26–0 | | |
| October 23 | Williamsburg (KY) | **Tennessee** | Baldwin Park • Knoxville, TN | **W** 6–0 | | |
| October 23 | Georgetown (KY) | **Kentucky State** | Lexington, KY | **W** 20–4 | | |
| October 23 | **Clemson** | Charlotte YMCA | Latta Park • Charlotte, NC | **W** 10–0 | | |
| October 23 | VMI | **Vanderbilt** | Dudley Field • Nashville, TN | **W** 12–0 | | |
| October 25 | **Clemson** | North Carolina | Chapel Hill, NC | **L** 28–0 | | |
| October 29 | **Auburn** | **Nashville** | Nashville, TN | **AUB** 14–4 | | |

==== Week Five ====
| Date | Visiting team | Home team | Site | Result | Attendance | Reference |
|---|---|---|---|---|---|---|
| October 30 | **Auburn** | **Sewanee** | Hardee Field • Sewanee, TN | **T** 0–0 | | |
| October 30 | Washington and Lee | **Central** | Lexington, KY | **L** 0–22 | | |
| October 30 | Virginia | **Georgia** | Brisbine Park • Atlanta, GA | **L** 4–17 | 5,000 | |
| October 30 | **Kentucky State** | **Vanderbilt** | Dudley Field • Nashville, TN | **VAN** 50–0 | 400 | |
| October 30 | **Texas** | Dallas | Cycle Park • Dallas, TX | **L** 4–18 | | |
| November 1 | **Texas** | Fort Worth | Fort Worth, TX | **L** 0–6 | | |
| November 3 | **Texas** | Add-Ran Christian | Waco, TX | **W** 18–10 | | |

==== Week Six ====
| Date | Visiting team | Home team | Site | Result | Attendance | Reference |
|---|---|---|---|---|---|---|
| November 5 | North Carolina | **Sewanee** | Hardee Field • Sewanee, TN | **L** 6–12 | | |
| November 6 | North Carolina | **Vanderbilt** | Dudley Field • Nashville, TN | **W** 31–0 | | |
| November 6 | **Central** | **Kentucky State** | Lexington, KY | **CENT** 18–0 | | |
| November 8 | North Carolina | **Tennessee** | Baldwin Park • Knoxville, TN | **L** 0–16 | | |
| November 10 | **Clemson** | South Carolina | Columbia, SC | **W** 18–6 | | |

==== Week Seven ====
| Date | Visiting team | Home team | Site | Result | Attendance | Reference |
|---|---|---|---|---|---|---|
| November 13 | Tuscaloosa Athletic Club | **Alabama** | The Quad • Tuscaloosa, AL | **W** 6–0 | | |
| November 13 | Houston Town Team | **Texas** | Varsity Athletic Field • Austin, TX | **W** 42–6 | | |

==== Week Eight ====
| Date | Time | Visiting team | Home team | Site | Result | Attendance | Reference |
|---|---|---|---|---|---|---|---|
| November 20 | | **Texas** | San Antonio | San Antonio, TX | **W** 12–0 | | |
| November 25 | | Fort Worth | **Texas** | Varsity Athletic Field • Austin, TX | **W** 38–0 | | |
| November 25 | | Centre | **Kentucky State** | Lexington, KY | **L** 0–36 | | |
| November 25 | | **Sewanee** | **Vanderbilt** | Dudley Field • Nashville, TN | **VAN** 10–0 | | |
| November 25 | | **Tennessee** | VPI | Roanoke, VA | **W** 18–0 | | |

==== Week Nine ====
| Date | Time | Visiting team | Home team | Site | Result | Attendance | Reference |
|---|---|---|---|---|---|---|---|
| November 26 | | **Tennessee** | Bristol Athletic Club | Bristol, TN | **W** 12–0 | | |

==== Week Ten ====
| Date | Visiting team | Home team | Site | Result | Attendance | Reference |
|---|---|---|---|---|---|---|
| December 7 | Virginia | **Vanderbilt** | Dudley Field • Nashville, TN | **T** 0–0 | 2,400 | |

==== Week Eleven ====
| Date | Visiting team | Home team | Site | Result | Attendance | Reference |
|---|---|---|---|---|---|---|
| December 11 | Dallas | **Texas** | Varsity Athletic Field • Austin, TX | **W** 20–16 | | |

==== Week Thirteen ====
| Date | Visiting team | Home team | Site | Result | Attendance | Reference |
|---|---|---|---|---|---|---|
| December 20 | Montgomery Athletic Club | **LSU** | State Field • Baton Rouge, LA | **W** 28–6 | | |

==== Week Sixteen ====
| Date | Visiting team | Home team | Site | Result | Attendance | Reference |
|---|---|---|---|---|---|---|
| January 8 | Cincinnati | **LSU** | State Field • Baton Rouge, LA | **L** 0–28 | | |
