= List of Clemson Tigers football seasons =

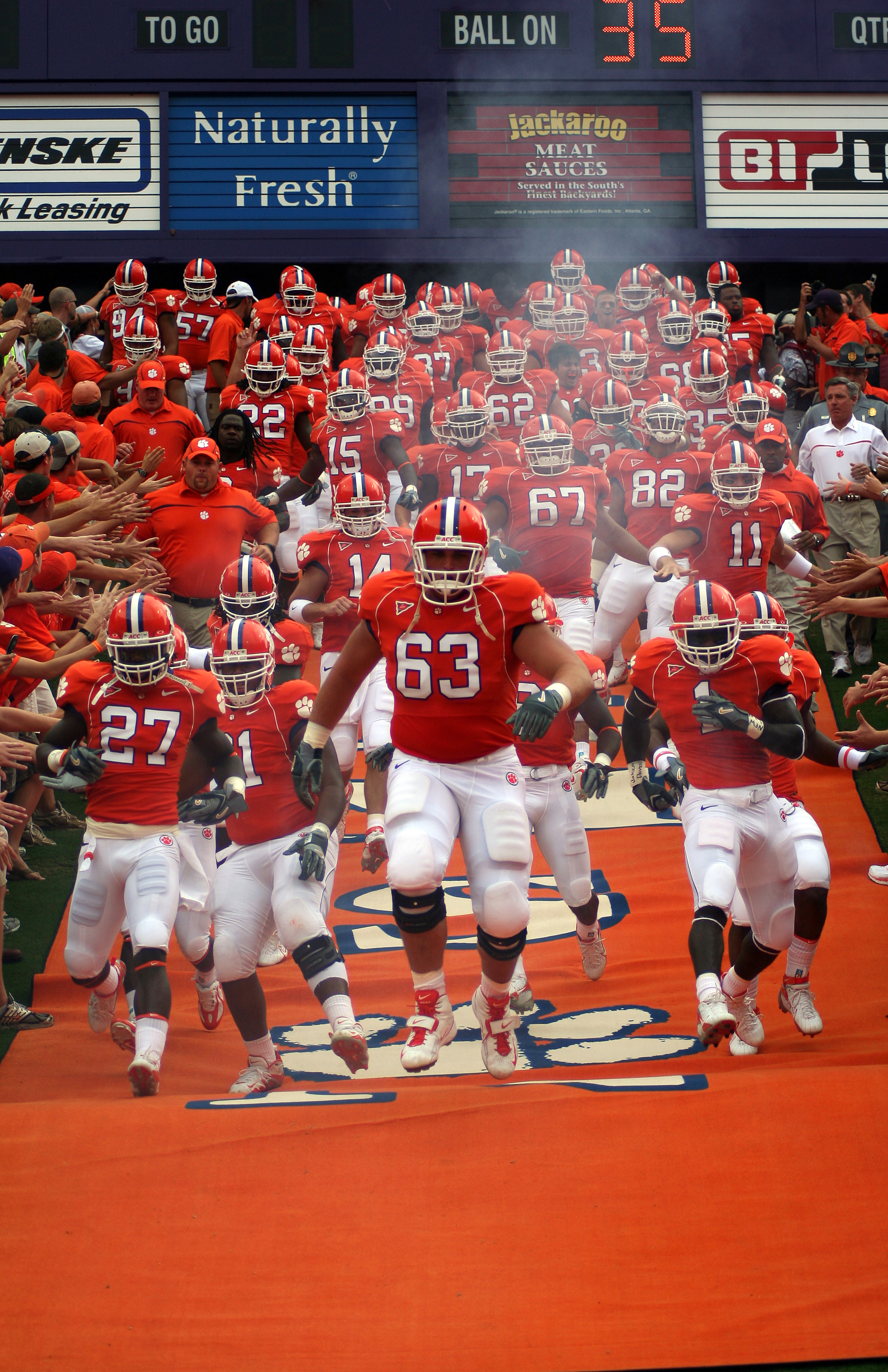
The 2008 Clemson Tigers team taking the field at Memorial Stadium.

The Clemson Tigers college football team competes as part of the National Collegiate Athletic Association (NCAA) Division I Football Bowl Subdivision, representing Clemson University in the Atlantic Division of the Atlantic Coast Conference (ACC). Clemson has played their home games at Memorial Stadium in Clemson, South Carolina since 1942. The Tigers have three national championship titles (1981, 2016 and 2018) along with two other national championship appearances in 2015 and 2019. The Tigers have claimed 26 conference championships and have appeared in 50 postseason bowl games with an overall record of 27-23. Clemson now has over 750 wins in its program.

== Seasons ==
| Year | Coach | Overall | Conference | Standing | Bowl/playoffs | Coaches^{#} | AP^{°} |
|---|---|---|---|---|---|---|---|
Walter Riggs (Independent) (1896)
| 1896 | Clemson | 2–1 | | | | | |
William M. Williams (Southern Intercollegiate Athletic Association) (1897)
| 1897 | Clemson | 2–2 | | | | | |
John Penton (Southern Intercollegiate Athletic Association) (1898)
| 1898 | Clemson | 3–1 | 1–1 | T–6th | | | |
Walter Riggs (Southern Intercollegiate Athletic Association) (1899)
| 1899 | Clemson | 4–2 | 2–2 | 9th | | | |
John Heisman (Southern Intercollegiate Athletic Association) (1900–1903)
| 1900 | Clemson | 6–0 | 2–0 | 1st | | | |
| 1901 | Clemson | 3–1–1 | 2–0–1 | 2nd | | | |
| 1902 | Clemson | 6–1 | 5–0 | 1st | | | |
| 1903 | Clemson | 4–1–1 | 2–0–1 | T–1st | | | |
Shack Shealy (Southern Intercollegiate Athletic Association) (1904)
| 1904 | Clemson | 3–3–1 | 3–3–1 | 9th | | | |
Eddie Cochems (Independent) (1905)
| 1905 | Clemson | 3–2–1 | | | | | |
Bob Williams (Southern Intercollegiate Athletic Association) (1906)
| 1906 | Clemson | 4–0–3 | 4–0–2 | T–1st | | | |
Frank Shaughnessy (Southern Intercollegiate Athletic Association) (1907)
| 1907 | Clemson | 4–4 | 1–3 | 10th | | | |
Stein Stone (Southern Intercollegiate Athletic Association) (1908)
| 1908 | Clemson | 1–6 | 1–4 | 11th | | | |
Bob Williams (Southern Intercollegiate Athletic Association) (1909)
| 1909 | Clemson | 6–3 | 2–2 | | | | |
Frank Dobson (Southern Intercollegiate Athletic Association) (1910–1912)
| 1910 | Clemson | 4–3–1 | 2–3–1 | 10th | | | |
| 1911 | Clemson | 3–5 | 2–4 | 13th | | | |
| 1912 | Clemson | 4–4 | 3–3 | T–8th | | | |
Bob Williams (Southern Intercollegiate Athletic Association) (1913–1915)
| 1913 | Clemson | 4–4 | 2–4 | | | | |
| 1914 | Clemson | 5–3–1 | 3–2 | | | | |
| 1915 | Clemson | 2–4–2 | 1–0–1 | | | | |
Wayne Hart (Southern Intercollegiate Athletic Association) (1916)
| 1916 | Clemson | 3–6 | 2–4 | 17th | | | |
Edward Donahue (Southern Intercollegiate Athletic Association) (1917–1920)
| 1917 | Clemson | 6–2 | 5–1 | T–2nd | | | |
| 1918 | Clemson | 5–2 | 3–1 | 4th | | | |
| 1919 | Clemson | 6–2–2 | 3–2–2 | 11th | | | |
| 1920 | Clemson | 4–6–1 | 2–6 | 17th | | | |
E. J. Stewart (Southern Intercollegiate Athletic Association) (1921)
| 1921 | Clemson | 1–6–2 | 0–5–2 | 21st | | | |
E. J. Stewart (Southern Conference) (1922)
| 1922 | Clemson | 5–4 | 1–2 | T–11th | | | |
Bud Saunders (Southern Conference) (1923–1926)
| 1923 | Clemson | 5–2–1 | 1–1–1 | T–11th | | | |
| 1924 | Clemson | 2–6 | 0–3 | T–19th | | | |
| 1925 | Clemson | 1–7 | 0–4 | T–20th | | | |
| 1926 | Clemson | 2–7 (Note: Saunders resigned after the first four games of the 1926 season. Bob Williams, who had previously served as Clemson's head coach in 1906, 1909, and from 1913 to 1915, led the team for the final five games of the season. Clemson finished with an overall record of 2–7 and a conference mark of 1–3, placing 18th in the Southern Conference.) | 1–3 | 18th | | | |
Josh Cody (Southern Conference) (1927–1930)
| 1927 | Clemson | 5–3–1 | 2–2 | T–8th | | | |
| 1928 | Clemson | 8–3 | 4–2 | T–7th | | | |
| 1929 | Clemson | 8–3 | 3–3 | 12th | | | |
| 1930 | Clemson | 8–2 | 3–2 | 9th | | | |
Jess Neely (Southern Conference) (1931–1939)
| 1931 | Clemson | 1–6–2 | 1–4 | 20th | | | |
| 1932 | Clemson | 3–5–1 | 0–4 | T–21st | | | |
| 1933 | Clemson | 3–6–2 | 1–1 | T–5th | | | |
| 1934 | Clemson | 5–4 | 2–1 | 5th | | | |
| 1935 | Clemson | 6–3 | 2–1 | 4th | | | |
| 1936 | Clemson | 5–5 | 3–3 | 8th | | | |
| 1937 | Clemson | 4–4–1 | 2–0–1 | T–3rd | | | |
| 1938 | Clemson | 7–1–1 | 3–0–1 | 2nd | | | |
| 1939 | Clemson | 9–1 | 4–0 | 2nd | W Cotton | | 12 |
Frank Howard (Southern Conference) (1940–1952)
| 1940 | Clemson | 6–2–1 | 6–0 | 1st | | | |
| 1941 | Clemson | 7–2 | 5–1 | 3rd | | | |
| 1942 | Clemson | 3–6–1 | 2–3–1 | 9th | | | |
| 1943 | Clemson | 2–6 | 2–3 | T–7th | | | |
| 1944 | Clemson | 4–5 | 3–1 | 3rd | | | |
| 1945 | Clemson | 6–3–1 | 2–1–1 | 4th | | | |
| 1946 | Clemson | 4–5 | 2–3 | T–10th | | | |
| 1947 | Clemson | 4–5 | 1–3 | 12th | | | |
| 1948 | Clemson | 11–0 | 5–0 | 1st | W Gator | | 11 |
| 1949 | Clemson | 4–4–2 | 2–2 | T–7th | | | |
| 1950 | Clemson | 9–0–1 | 3–0–1 | 2nd | W Orange | 12 | 10 |
| 1951 | Clemson | 7–3 | 3–1 | 5th | L Gator | | 20 |
| 1952 | Clemson | 2–6–1 | (Note: When Clemson and Maryland defied the Southern Conference's ban on postseason games by participating in bowl games after the 1951 season, the conference placed both schools on probation for one year and imposed a football scheduling boycott against them. Accordingly, Clemson was able to play games against only two conference opponents in 1952: Maryland (also on probation) and South Carolina (the annual "Big Thursday" rivalry game was set by the South Carolina Legislature and was therefore exempted from the boycott).) | | | | |
Frank Howard (Atlantic Coast Conference) (1953–1969)
| 1953 | Clemson | 3–5–1 | 1–2 | 6th | | | |
| 1954 | Clemson | 5–5 | 1–2 | 5th | | | |
| 1955 | Clemson | 7–3 | 3–1 | 3rd | | | |
| 1956 | Clemson | 7–2–2 | 4–0–1 | 1st | L Orange | | 19 |
| 1957 | Clemson | 7–3 | 4–3 | T–3rd | | 18 | |
| 1958 | Clemson | 8–3 | 5–1 | 1st | L Sugar | 13 | 12 |
| 1959 | Clemson | 9–2 | 6–1 | 1st | W Bluebonnet | 11 | 11 |
| 1960 | Clemson | 6–4 | 4–2 | 4th | | | |
| 1961 | Clemson | 5–5 | 3–3 | T–3rd | | | |
| 1962 | Clemson | 6–4 | 5–1 | 2nd | | | |
| 1963 | Clemson | 5–4–1 | 5–2 | T–3rd | | | |
| 1964 | Clemson | 3–7 | 2–4 | 7th | | | |
| 1965 | Clemson | 5–5 | 4–3 | T–1st | | | |
| 1966 | Clemson | 6–4 | 6–1 | 1st | | | |
| 1967 | Clemson | 6–4 | 6–0 | 1st | | | |
| 1968 | Clemson | 4–5–1 | 4–1–1 | 2nd | | | |
| 1969 | Clemson | 4–6 | 3–3 | T–3rd | | | |
Hootie Ingram (Atlantic Coast Conference) (1970–1972)
| 1970 | Clemson | 3–8 | 2–4 | 6th | | | |
| 1971 | Clemson | 5–6 | 4–2 | 2nd | | | |
| 1972 | Clemson | 4–7 | 2–4 | 5th | | | |
Red Parker (Atlantic Coast Conference) (1973–1976)
| 1973 | Clemson | 5–6 | 4–2 | 3rd | | | |
| 1974 | Clemson | 7–4 | 4–2 | T–2nd | | | |
| 1975 | Clemson | 2–9 | 2–3 | 5th | | | |
| 1976 | Clemson | 3–6–2 | 0–4–1 | 7th | | | |
Charley Pell (Atlantic Coast Conference) (1977–1978)
| 1977 | Clemson | 8–3–1 | 4–1–1 | 3rd | L Gator | | 19 |
| 1978 | Clemson (Note: Pell left for Florida after the 1978 regular season. Assistant coach Danny Ford coached the Tigers in the Gator Bowl. Clemson credits the regular season to Pell and the Gator Bowl to Ford.) | 11–1 | 6–0 | 1st | W Gator | 7 | 6 |
Danny Ford (Atlantic Coast Conference) (1978–1989)
| 1979 | Clemson | 8–4 | 4–2 | T–2nd | L Peach | | |
| 1980 | Clemson | 6–5 | 2–4 | T–4th | | | |
| 1981 | Clemson | 12–0 | 6–0 | 1st | W Orange | 1 | 1 |
| 1982 | Clemson | 9–1–1 | 6–0 | 1st | Ineligible (Note: Clemson was placed on probation near the end of the season for recruiting violations, and was made ineligible for a bowl bid.) | | 8 |
| 1983 | Clemson | 9–1–1 | 7–0 | 1st (Note: Clemson was under ACC probation in 1982 and 1983 and was not eligible for the ACC title or a bowl game.) | Ineligible | | 11 |
| 1984 | Clemson | 7–4 | 5–2 | 2nd | Ineligible | | |
| 1985 | Clemson | 6–6 | 4–3 | 4th | L Independence | | |
| 1986 | Clemson | 8–2–2 | 5–1–1 | 1st | W Gator | 19 | 17 |
| 1987 | Clemson | 10–2 | 6–1 | 1st | W Florida Citrus | 10 | 12 |
| 1988 | Clemson | 10–2 | 6–1 | 1st | W Florida Citrus | 8 | 9 |
| 1989 | Clemson | 10–2 | 5–2 | 3rd | W Gator | 11 | 12 |
Ken Hatfield (Atlantic Coast Conference) (1990–1993)
| 1990 | Clemson | 10–2 | 5–2 | T–2nd | W Hall of Fame | 9 | 9 |
| 1991 | Clemson | 9–2–1 | 6–0–1 | 1st | L Florida Citrus | 17 | 18 |
| 1992 | Clemson | 5–6 | 3–5 | 7th | | | |
| 1993 | Clemson (Note: Hatfield resigned after the regular season. Tommy West coached Clemson in the Peach Bowl. Clemson credits the 1993 regular season to Hatfield and the Peach Bowl to West.) | 9–3 | 5–3 | T–3rd | W Peach | 22 | 23 |
Tommy West (Atlantic Coast Conference) (1993–1998)
| 1994 | Clemson | 5–6 | 4–4 | 6th | | | |
| 1995 | Clemson | 8–4 | 6–2 | 2nd | L Gator | | |
| 1996 | Clemson | 7–5 | 6–2 | T–2nd | L Peach | | |
| 1997 | Clemson | 7–5 | 4–4 | 5th | L Peach | | |
| 1998 | Clemson | 3–8 | 1–7 | T–9th | | | |
Tommy Bowden (Atlantic Coast Conference) (1999–2008)
| 1999 | Clemson | 6–6 | 5–3 | 2nd | L Peach | | |
| 2000 | Clemson | 9–3 | 6–2 | 2nd | L Gator | 14 | 16 |
| 2001 | Clemson | 7–5 | 4–4 | T–4th | W Humanitarian | | |
| 2002 | Clemson | 7–6 | 4–4 | T–5th | L Tangerine | | |
| 2003 | Clemson | 9–4 | 5–3 | 3rd | W Peach | 22 | 22 |
| 2004 | Clemson | 6–5 | 4–4 | T–6th | (Note: The team self-imposed punishment for team fight with South Carolina and declined a bowl bid.) | | |
| 2005 | Clemson | 8–4 | 4–4 | 3rd (Atlantic) | W Champs Sports | 21 | 21 |
| 2006 | Clemson | 8–5 | 5–3 | T–2nd (Atlantic) | L Music City | | |
| 2007 | Clemson | 9–4 | 5–3 | 2nd (Atlantic) | L Chick-fil-A | 22 | 21 |
| 2008 | Clemson (Note: The Tigers were led by head coach Tommy Bowden, who resigned six games into his tenth season. The interim head coach was assistant coach Dabo Swinney.[) | 7–6 | 4–4 | T–3rd (Atlantic) | L Gator | | |
Dabo Swinney (Atlantic Coast Conference) (2008–present)
| 2009 | Clemson | 9–5 | 6–2 | 1st (Atlantic) | W Music City | | 24 |
| 2010 | Clemson | 6–7 | 4–4 | T–4th (Atlantic) | L Meineke Car Care | | |
| 2011 | Clemson | 10–4 | 6–2 | 1st (Atlantic) | L Orange^{†} | 22 | 22 |
| 2012 | Clemson | 11–2 | 7–1 | T–1st (Atlantic) | W Chick-fil-A | 9 | 11 |
| 2013 | Clemson | 11–2 | 7–1 | 2nd (Atlantic) | W Orange^{†} | 7 | 8 |
| 2014 | Clemson | 10–3 | 6–2 | 2nd (Atlantic) | W Russell Athletic | 15 | 15 |
| 2015 | Clemson | 14–1 | 8–0 | 1st (Atlantic) | W Orange^{†} (CFP Semifinal); L CFP NCG^{†} | 2 | 2 |
| 2016 | Clemson | 14–1 | 7–1 | 1st (Atlantic) | W Fiesta^{†} (CFP Semifinal); W CFP NCG^{†} | 1 | 1 |
| 2017 | Clemson | 12–2 | 7–1 | 1st (Atlantic) | L Sugar^{†} (CFP Semifinal) | 4 | 4 |
| 2018 | Clemson | 15–0 | 8–0 | 1st (Atlantic) | W Cotton^{†} (CFP Semifinal); W CFP NCG^{†} | 1 | 1 |
| 2019 | Clemson | 14–1 | 8–0 | 1st (Atlantic) | W Fiesta^{†} (CFP Semifinal); L CFP NCG^{†} | 2 | 2 |
| 2020 | Clemson | 10–2 | 8–1 | 2nd | L Sugar^{†} (CFP Semifinal) | 3 | 3 |
| 2021 | Clemson | 10–3 | 6–2 | T–2nd (Atlantic) | W Cheez-It | 16 | 14 |
| 2022 | Clemson | 11–3 | 8–0 | 1st (Atlantic) | L Orange^{†} | 12 | 13 |
| 2023 | Clemson | 9–4 | 4–4 | T–6th | W Gator | 20 | 20 |
| 2024 | Clemson | 10–4 | 7–1 | 2nd | L CFP First Round^{†} | 11 | 14 |
| 2025 | Clemson | 7–6 | 4–4 | T–7th | L Pinstripe | | |
| Total: | | 802–462–44 | | | | | |
National championship Conference title Conference division title or championship game berth
^{†}Indicates Bowl Coalition, Bowl Alliance, BCS, or CFP / New Years' Six bowl.; ^{#}Rankings from final Coaches Poll.

== Works cited ==
- "Football Bowl Subdivision Records" (PDF). National Collegiate Athletic Association. Archived (PDF) from the original on July 27, 2011.
- Bourret, Tim. "2010 Clemson Football Media Guide" (PDF). Clemson University. Archived from the original (PDF) on November 12, 2012.
