= List of Clemson Tigers head football coaches =

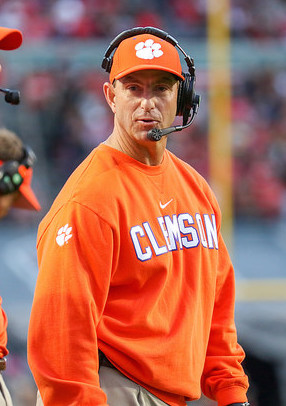
Clemson head coach Dabo Swinney

The Clemson Tigers football program is a college football team that represents Clemson University in the Atlantic Division of the Atlantic Coast Conference (ACC). The Tigers compete as part of the National Collegiate Athletic Association (NCAA) Division I Football Bowl Subdivision. The team has had 25 head coaches since it began play in the 1896 season. Since October 2008, Dabo Swinney has served as Clemson's head coach.

The team has played in over 1,300 games over 129 seasons. In that time, eight coaches have led Clemson to postseason bowl games: Jess Neely, Frank Howard, Charley Pell, Danny Ford, Ken Hatfield, Tommy West, Tommy Bowden, and Swinney. Five coaches have won conference championships with the Tigers: John Heisman won two as a member of the Southern Intercollegiate Athletic Association; Howard won two as a member of the Southern Conference; and Howard, Pell, Ford, Hatfield, and Swinney won a combined 14 as a member of the Atlantic Coast Conference. In 1981, Ford led the Tigers to the national championship. Swinney has guided the Tigers to six ACC championships and four national title appearances, winning the 2016 and 2018 championships, while losing the 2015 and 2019 championships.

Howard is the all-time leader in games coached (295), seasons coached (30), and second in total wins (165). Heisman has the highest winning percentage, with .833 in his four years at Clemson. Of coaches with more than one season, Hootie Ingram has the lowest winning percentage (.364 in 3 seasons). Of the 25 head coaches who have led the Tigers, Heisman, Jess Neely, Ford, and Howard have been inducted into the College Football Hall of Fame as coaches; Josh Cody was inducted into the Hall of Fame as a player.

== Key ==
Key to symbols in coaches list
General		Overall		Conference		Postseason (Note: Although the first Rose Bowl Game was played in 1902, it has been continuously played since the 1916 game, and is recognized as the oldest bowl game by the NCAA. "—" indicates any season prior to 1916 when postseason games were not played.)	
No.	Order of coaches (Note: A running total of the number of head coaches, with coaches who served separate tenures being counted only once. Interim head coaches are represented with "Int" and are not counted in the running total. "—" indicates the team played but either without a coach or no coach is on record. "X" indicates an interim year without play.)	GC	Games coached	CW	Conference wins	PW	Postseason wins
DC	Division championships	OW	Overall wins	CL	Conference losses	PL	Postseason losses
CC	Conference championships	OL	Overall losses	CT	Conference ties	PT	Postseason ties
NC	National championships	OT	Overall ties (Note: Overtime rules in college football were introduced in 1996, making ties impossible in the period since.)	C%	Conference winning percentage		
†	Elected to the College Football Hall of Fame	O%	Overall winning percentage (Note: When computing the win–loss percentage, a tie counts as half a win and half a loss.)				

== Coaches ==
List of head football coaches showing season(s) coached, overall records, conference records, postseason records, championships and selected awards (Note: Statistics correct as of the end of the 2025 NCAA Division I FBS football season.)
No.	Name	Term(s)	GC	OW	OL	OT	O%	CW	CL	CT	C%	PW	PL	DCs	CCs	NCs	Awards
1	Walter Riggs	1896; 1899	9	6	3	0	0.667	3	2	0	0.600	—	—	—	0	0	—
2	William M. Williams	1897	4	2	2	0	0.500	—	—	—	—	—	—	—	—	0	—
3	John Penton	1898	4	3	1	0	0.750	—	—	—	—	—	—	—	—	0	—
4	John Heisman^{†}	1900–1903	24	19	3	2	0.833	16	0	2	0.944	—	—	—	3	0	—
5	Shack Shealy	1904	7	3	3	1	0.500	3	3	1	0.500	—	—	—	0	0	—
6	Eddie Cochems	1905	6	3	2	1	0.583	3	2	1	0.583	—	—	—	0	0	—
7	Bob Williams	1906; 1909; 1913–1915; 1926 (Note: Williams replaced Saunders for the final 5 games of the 1926 season.)	46	21	19	6	0.522	10	10	5	0.500	0	0	—	0	0	—
8	Frank Shaughnessy	1907	8	4	4	0	0.500	1	3	0	0.250	—	—	—	0	0	—
9	John N. Stone	1908	7	1	6	0	0.143	0	4	0	.000	—	—	—	0	0	—
10	Frank Dobson	1910–1912	24	11	12	1	0.479	7	12	1	0.375	—	—	—	0	0	—
11	Wayne Hart	1916	9	3	6	0	0.333	2	4	0	0.333	0	0	—	0	0	—
12	Edward Donahue	1917–1920	36	21	12	3	0.625	13	10	2	0.560	0	0	—	0	0	—
13	E. J. Stewart	1921–1922	18	6	10	2	0.389	2	9	2	0.231	0	0	—	0	0	—
14	Bud Saunders	1923–1926	28	10	17	1	0.375	2	9	1	0.208	0	0	—	0	0	—
15	Josh Cody^{†} (Note: Cody was inducted into the Hall of Fame as a player at Vanderbilt.)	1927–1930	41	29	11	1	0.720	12	9	0	0.571	0	0	—	0	0	—
16	Jess Neely^{†}	1931–1939	85	43	35	7	0.547	18	13	2	0.576	1	0	—	0	0	—
17	Frank Howard^{†}	1940–1969	295	165	118	12	0.580	100	48	5	0.670 (Note: Howard had a record of 34–18–3 (0.645) against Southern Conference opponents and 66–30–2 (0.684) against ACC opponents.)	3	3	—	8	0	ACC Coach of the Year (1958); ACC Coach of the Year (1966)
18	Hootie Ingram	1970–1972	33	12	21	0	0.364	8	10	0	0.444	0	0	—	0	0	—
19	Red Parker	1973–1976	44	17	25	2	0.409	10	11	1	0.477	0	0	—	0	0	ACC Coach of the Year (1974)
20	Charley Pell	1977–1978	23	18	4	1	0.804	10	1	1	0.875	0	1	—	1	0	ACC Coach of the Year (1977); ACC Coach of the Year (1978)
21	Danny Ford^{†}	1978–1989 (Note: Ford replaced Pell for the final game of the 1978 season.)	129	96	29	4	0.760	56	16	1	0.774	6	2	—	5	1 – 1981	ACC Coach of the Year (1981); FWAA Coach of the Year (1981); Woody Hayes Trophy (1981); AFCA Coach of the Year (1981)
22	Ken Hatfield	1990–1993	46	32	13	1	0.707	19	10	1	0.650	1	1	—	1	0	—
23	Tommy West	1993–1998 (Note: West replaced Hatfield for the final game of the 1993 season.)	59	31	28	0	0.525	21	19	0	0.525	1	3	—	0	0	—
24	Tommy Bowden	1999–2008	117	72	45	—	0.615	43	32	—	0.573	3	5	0	0	0	ACC Coach of the Year (1999); ACC Coach of the Year (2003)
25	Dabo Swinney	2008–present (Note: Swinney replaced Bowden for the final 7 games of the 2008 season.)	240	187	53	—	0.779	113	29	—	0.796	12	10	10	9	2 — (2016) (2018)	Bobby Dodd Coach of the Year (2011) AP Coach of the Year (2015); Walter Camp Coach of the Year (2015); ACC Coach of the Year (2015)
