= 1897 Georgia Bulldogs football team =

American college football season

1897 Georgia Bulldogs football
- Conference: Southern Intercollegiate Athletic Association
- Record: 2–1 (2–0 SIAA)
- Head coach: Charles McCarthy (1st season)
- Captain: William B. Kent
- Home stadium: Herty Field

1897 Southern Intercollegiate Athletic Association football standings
	Conf.					Overall
Team	W		L		T	W		L		T
Vanderbilt $	3	–	0	–	0	6	–	0	–	1
Georgia	2	–	0	–	0	2	–	1	–	0
Auburn	2	–	0	–	1	2	–	0	–	1
Central (KY)	1	–	1	–	0	1	–	2	–	0
Nashville	1	–	1	–	0	1	–	1	–	0
Alabama	0	–	0	–	0	1	–	0	–	0
Tennessee	0	–	0	–	0	4	–	1	–	1
Texas	0	–	0	–	0	6	–	2	–	0
LSU	0	–	0	–	0	1	–	1	–	0
Sewanee	1	–	2	–	1	1	–	3	–	1
Clemson	0	–	1	–	0	2	–	2	–	0
Mercer	0	–	1	–	0	0	–	2	–	1
Cumberland (TN)	0	–	1	–	0	0	–	1	–	0
Kentucky State College	0	–	2	–	0	2	–	4	–	0
SW Presbyterian	0	–	0	–	0	0	–	0	–	0
$ – Conference champion

The 1897 Georgia Bulldogs football team represented the University of Georgia during the 1897 Southern Intercollegiate Athletic Association football season. The Bulldogs competed as a member of the Southern Intercollegiate Athletic Association (SIAA) and completed the season with a 2–1 record. In the 1897 season, Georgia beat Georgia Tech for the first time and met both Clemson and Virginia for the first time. This was the Georgia Bulldogs' first season under the guidance of head coach Charles McCarthy.

It was in the Virginia game of 1897 that tragedy struck the Georgia Bulldogs. In the second half of that game, a Georgia fullback named Richard Vonalbade ("Von") Gammon, was fatally injured in a play. In reaction to his death, the Georgia, Georgia Tech and Mercer football teams disbanded, the Atlanta Journal ran a headline proclaiming, the "Death Knell of Football" and the Georgia legislature passed a bill to outlaw football in the state of Georgia. As the bill sat on the desk of Georgia Governor William Yates Atkinson, a letter that Gammon's mother, Rosalind Burns Gammon, had written to the state legislature was revealed. In her letter, she pleaded with the legislators not to pass the bill because her son so loved football. As a result, reading her letter, Governor Atkinson vetoed the bill to ban football in Georgia.

== Schedule ==
Date	Opponent	Site	Result	Attendance	Source
October 9	Clemson	Herty Field; Athens, GA (rivalry)	W 24–0		
October 23	Georgia Tech	Herty Field; Athens, GA (rivalry)	W 28–0	600	
October 30	vs. Virginia*	Brisbine Park; Atlanta, GA	L 17–4	5,000	
*Non-conference game
