= 1897 Vanderbilt Commodores football team =

American college football season

1897 Vanderbilt Commodores football
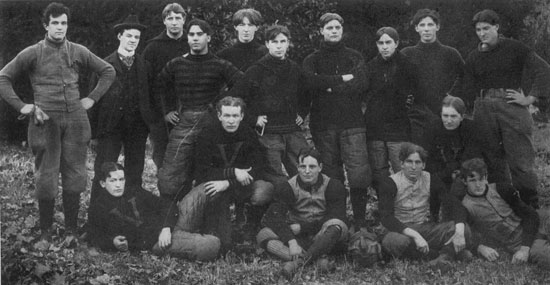

SIAA champion
- Conference: Southern Intercollegiate Athletic Association
- Record: 6–0–1 (3–0 SIAA)
- Head coach: R. G. Acton (2nd season)
- Captain: Howard Boogher
- Home stadium: Dudley Field

1897 Southern Intercollegiate Athletic Association football standings
	Conf.					Overall
Team	W		L		T	W		L		T
Vanderbilt $	3	–	0	–	0	6	–	0	–	1
Georgia	2	–	0	–	0	2	–	1	–	0
Auburn	2	–	0	–	1	2	–	0	–	1
Central (KY)	1	–	1	–	0	1	–	2	–	0
Nashville	1	–	1	–	0	1	–	1	–	0
Alabama	0	–	0	–	0	1	–	0	–	0
Tennessee	0	–	0	–	0	4	–	1	–	1
Texas	0	–	0	–	0	6	–	2	–	0
LSU	0	–	0	–	0	1	–	1	–	0
Sewanee	1	–	2	–	1	1	–	3	–	1
Clemson	0	–	1	–	0	2	–	2	–	0
Mercer	0	–	1	–	0	0	–	2	–	1
Cumberland (TN)	0	–	1	–	0	0	–	1	–	0
Kentucky State College	0	–	2	–	0	2	–	4	–	0
SW Presbyterian	0	–	0	–	0	0	–	0	–	0
$ – Conference champion

The 1897 Vanderbilt Commodores football team represent Vanderbilt University during the 1897 Southern Intercollegiate Athletic Association football season. Vanderbilt was in its eighth season of playing football; coached by R. G. Acton. The Commodores finished the season without being scored on. Vanderbilt played in the Southern Intercollegiate Athletic Association (SIAA) and won the SIAA Championship, the first claimed in school history.

== Schedule ==
Date	Opponent	Site	Result	Attendance	Source
October 9	Kentucky University*	Dudley Field; Nashville, TN	W 22–0		
October 16	Central (KY)	Dudley Field; Nashville, TN	W 14–0		
October 19	VMI*	Dudley Field; Nashville, TN	W 12–0		
October 30	Kentucky State College	Dudley Field; Nashville, TN (rivalry)	W 50–0	400	
November 6	North Carolina*	Dudley Field; Nashville, TN	W 31–0		
November 25	Sewanee	Dudley Field; Nashville, TN (rivalry)	W 10–0		
December 6	Virginia*	Dudley Field; Nashville, TN	T 0–0	2,400–4,000	
*Non-conference game

== Game summaries ==
=== Kentucky University ===
The season opened with a 22–0 defeat of Kentucky University

=== Central (KY) ===
On October 16, Vanderbilt had a hard time defeating Central of Kentucky.

=== VMI ===
The VMI Keydets fell to Vanderbilt 12–0.

=== Kentucky State College ===
Team	1	2	Total
• Vanderbilt	12	38	50
Kentucky St.	0	0	0

- Location: Dudley Field
  Nashville, Tennessee
- Game attendance: 400
- Referee: Dr. R. A. Barr

Vanderbilt rolled up a 50–0 score over Kentucky State College. The starting lineup was Boogher (left end), McAlister (left tackle), Whitemore (left guard), Brown (center), Hassett (right guard), Langhorst (right tackle), Stringfield (right end), Cox (quarterback), Connell (left halfback), Dye (right halfback), Farrell (fullback).

In the second half of the Georgia–Virginia game in Atlanta, a Georgia fullback named Richard Von Albade ("Von") Gammon was fatally injured on a play. The Georgia, Georgia Tech and Mercer football teams soon disbanded. The Atlanta Journal ran a headline; "Death Knell of Football" and the Georgia legislature passed a bill to outlaw football in the state of Georgia.

=== North Carolina ===
On November 6, the Commodores beat the Tar Heels 31–0 .

=== Sewanee ===
Vanderbilt beat in-state rival Sewanee 10–0.

A shocking event occurred in 1897 at the Thanksgiving Day match with Sewanee on the original Dudley Field. The word "hell" had been used in the line of a popular cheer on campus by Vanderbilt students and spread into events as football. This caused uproar with the university administration and the city of Nashville. Both teams commenced to pass the ball around for the purpose of limbering up. Throughout this preliminary the students of both colleges gave their respective yells and sung their several songs written for the occasion. There was one yell given with great frequency by the Vanderbilt students which was very offensive to decent people. It starts off "Hippity Huz, Hippity Huz; What in the hell is the matter with us." It had become so popular at Vanderbilt that it was in the minds and causes them to be oblivious to the fact that it was not exactly proper to shock refined ladies by such utterances.

Phil Connell and captain Howard Boogher dove to recover the ball after the victory.

=== Virginia ===
Virginia at Vanderbilt

Team	1	2	Total
Virginia	0	0	0
Vanderbilt	0	0	0

- Location: Dudley Field
  Nashville, Tennessee
- Game attendance: 2,400
- Game weather: Favorable

After the Sewanee game, all talk in Nashville was about Vanderbilt being the champions of the South. The other southern university with an outstanding season was the Virginia. The Orange and Blue were 6–2 with losses to Navy and Penn. Virginia agreed to come to Nashville for a game on December 6 with a guarantee of $600, plus half of the net receipts. Virginia used only 15 players and traveled 26 hours on the train that brought them to Nashville. A crowd of 2,400 watched the game end, 0–0.

The Nashville American reported, "Unquestionably it was the greatest game ever played in the South. The assaults on the line were terrific, the tackling was brutal, the entire play fierce. Only once was the 20-yard line of either team invaded. Almost immediately after McAlester kicked off, the terrors of the tandem play were displayed. This play meant to bend one side of the line so that the end, the tackle and the guard reinforced the four backs in their charges at the line. Whether the force was directed was not known."

Said Coach Acton, "It was the best game ever played in the South. Virginia was heavier and made most of her weight, using mass plays almost entirely. Our men played a more scientific game. My team can beat any team in America of the same weight." Vanderbilt's average weight was 165 pounds.

The starting lineup was Boogher (left end), McAlister (left tackle), Whitemore (left guard), Brown (center), Hassett (right guard), Langhorst (right tackle), Stringfield (right end), Goodson (quarterback), Connell (left halfback), Dye (right halfback), Farrell (fullback).

== Postseason ==
Vanderbilt and Virginia would share the southern title. The American also reported that, "The Vanderbilt players were in a jolly humor yesterday with their miniature football pinned upon the labels of their coats. Joe Goodson, quarterback, was apparently out of training from a large ten-cent cigar he smoked, a gift of Benjamin Childers of Pulaski. `Tab' Farrell had his hair cut and other members were more or less changed in appearance."
