= 1897 Sewanee Tigers football team =

American college football season

1897 Sewanee Tigers football
- Conference: Southern Intercollegiate Athletic Association
- Record: 1–3–1 (1–2–1 SIAA)
- Head coach: John Gere Jayne (1st season)
- Captain: Oscar Wilder
- Home stadium: Hardee Field

1897 Southern Intercollegiate Athletic Association football standings
	Conf.					Overall
Team	W		L		T	W		L		T
Vanderbilt $	3	–	0	–	0	6	–	0	–	1
Georgia	2	–	0	–	0	2	–	1	–	0
Auburn	2	–	0	–	1	2	–	0	–	1
Central (KY)	1	–	1	–	0	1	–	2	–	0
Nashville	1	–	1	–	0	1	–	1	–	0
Alabama	0	–	0	–	0	1	–	0	–	0
Tennessee	0	–	0	–	0	4	–	1	–	1
Texas	0	–	0	–	0	6	–	2	–	0
LSU	0	–	0	–	0	1	–	1	–	0
Sewanee	1	–	2	–	1	1	–	3	–	1
Clemson	0	–	1	–	0	2	–	2	–	0
Mercer	0	–	1	–	0	0	–	2	–	1
Cumberland (TN)	0	–	1	–	0	0	–	1	–	0
Kentucky State College	0	–	2	–	0	2	–	4	–	0
SW Presbyterian	0	–	0	–	0	0	–	0	–	0
$ – Conference champion

The 1897 Sewanee Tigers football team represented the Sewanee Tigers of Sewanee: The University of the South during the 1897 Southern Intercollegiate Athletic Association football season.

== Schedule ==
Date	Opponent	Site	Result	Source
October 16	at Nashville	Nashville, TN	L 5–6	
October 18	Central (KY)	Hardee Field; Sewanee, TN	W 4–0	
October 30	at Auburn	Hardee Field; Sewanee, TN	T 0–0	
November 5	North Carolina*	Hardee Field; Sewanee, TN	L 6–12	
November 25	Vanderbilt	Dudley Field; Nashville, TN (rivalry)	L 0–10	
*Non-conference game
