= Punton =

Punton is a surname. Notable people with the surname include:

- Bill Punton (born 1934), Scottish footballer and manager
- Bill Punton (born 1957), English footballer
- Noel Punton (1931–2017), Australian gymnast

== See also ==
- Penton (surname)
