= 1897 Alabama Crimson White football team =

American college football season

1897 Alabama Crimson White football
- Conference: Southern Intercollegiate Athletic Association
- Record: 1–0 (0–0 SIAA)
- Head coach: Allen McCants (1st season)
- Captain: Frank S. White
- Home stadium: The Quad

1897 Southern Intercollegiate Athletic Association football standings
	Conf.					Overall
Team	W		L		T	W		L		T
Vanderbilt $	3	–	0	–	0	6	–	0	–	1
Georgia	2	–	0	–	0	2	–	1	–	0
Auburn	2	–	0	–	1	2	–	0	–	1
Central (KY)	1	–	1	–	0	1	–	2	–	0
Nashville	1	–	1	–	0	1	–	1	–	0
Alabama	0	–	0	–	0	1	–	0	–	0
Tennessee	0	–	0	–	0	4	–	1	–	1
Texas	0	–	0	–	0	6	–	2	–	0
LSU	0	–	0	–	0	1	–	1	–	0
Sewanee	1	–	2	–	1	1	–	3	–	1
Clemson	0	–	1	–	0	2	–	2	–	0
Mercer	0	–	1	–	0	0	–	2	–	1
Cumberland (TN)	0	–	1	–	0	0	–	1	–	0
Kentucky State College	0	–	2	–	0	2	–	4	–	0
SW Presbyterian	0	–	0	–	0	0	–	0	–	0
$ – Conference champion

The 1897 Alabama Crimson White football team (Note: Alabama football teams were not referred to as the "Crimson Tide" until the 1907 season. Prior to 1907, the team was called the "Crimson White" from 1893 to 1906 and the "Cadets" in 1892.) (variously "Alabama", "UA" or "Bama") represented the University of Alabama in the 1897 Southern Intercollegiate Athletic Association football season. The team was led by head coach Allen McCants, in his first season, and played their home games at The Quad in Tuscaloosa, Alabama. In what was the sixth season of Alabama football, the team finished with a record of one win and zero losses (1–0, 0–0 SIAA).

In the spring of 1895, the University Board of Trustees passed a rule that prohibited athletic teams from competing off-campus for athletic events, and as such only one game was scheduled for the season. In their only game, the Crimson White shutout the Tuscaloosa Athletic Club on The Quad.

== Schedule ==
Date	Opponent	Site	Result	Source
November 13	Tuscaloosa Athletic Club*	The Quad; Tuscaloosa, AL	W 6–0	
*Non-conference game

(Note: For the 1897 season, point values were different from those used in contemporary games. In 1897 a touchdown was worth four points, a field goal was worth five points and an extra point was worth two points.)

== Game summaries ==
=== Tuscaloosa Athletic Club ===
In what was the only game played as part of the 1897 season due to prohibition against playing away games, Alabama defeated the Tuscaloosa Athletic Club 6–0 at The Quad in Tuscaloosa. Immediately after their victory, Alabama disbanded their team for the remainder of the season due to an inability to secure any additional home games.

== Players ==
Alabama Crimson White 1897 roster
Guards: E. L. McIntosh; D. D. Patton; Tackles: J. W. Blair; W. E. Matthews	Center: S. A. Cowan; Ends: J. G. Hillman; E. P. Windham	Backs: C. Marriott; Ed Tutwiler; Frank S. White; W. T. White	Substitutes: T. Burke; William Hester; Frank Milhouse; A. P. Tyson
