= 1897 Central Colonels football team =

American college football season

1897 Central Colonels football

State champion
- Conference: Southern Intercollegiate Athletic Association
- Record: 1–2 (1–1 SIAA)
- Head coach: H. McC. Anderson

1897 Southern Intercollegiate Athletic Association football standings
| | Conf. | | | | | Overall |
| Team | W | | L | | T | W | | L | | T |
|---|---|---|---|---|---|---|---|---|---|---|
| Vanderbilt $ | 3 | – | 0 | – | 0 | 6 | – | 0 | – | 1 |
| Georgia | 2 | – | 0 | – | 0 | 2 | – | 1 | – | 0 |
| Auburn | 2 | – | 0 | – | 1 | 2 | – | 0 | – | 1 |
| Central (KY) | 1 | – | 1 | – | 0 | 1 | – | 2 | – | 0 |
| Nashville | 1 | – | 1 | – | 0 | 1 | – | 1 | – | 0 |
| Alabama | 0 | – | 0 | – | 0 | 1 | – | 0 | – | 0 |
| Tennessee | 0 | – | 0 | – | 0 | 4 | – | 1 | – | 1 |
| Texas | 0 | – | 0 | – | 0 | 6 | – | 2 | – | 0 |
| LSU | 0 | – | 0 | – | 0 | 1 | – | 1 | – | 0 |
| Sewanee | 1 | – | 2 | – | 1 | 1 | – | 3 | – | 1 |
| Clemson | 0 | – | 1 | – | 0 | 2 | – | 2 | – | 0 |
| Mercer | 0 | – | 1 | – | 0 | 0 | – | 2 | – | 1 |
| Cumberland (TN) | 0 | – | 1 | – | 0 | 0 | – | 1 | – | 0 |
| Kentucky State College | 0 | – | 2 | – | 0 | 2 | – | 4 | – | 0 |
| SW Presbyterian | 0 | – | 0 | – | 0 | 0 | – | 0 | – | 0 |
$ – Conference champion

The 1897 Central Colonels football team represented Central University in Richmond, Kentucky during the 1897 college football season.

== Schedule ==
| Date | Opponent | Site | Result | Source |
|---|---|---|---|---|
| October 16 | at Vanderbilt | Dudley Field; Nashville, TN | L 10–14 | |
| October 30 | Washington and Lee* | Richmond, KY | L 0–22 | |
| November 6 | Kentucky State College | Richmond, KY | W 18–0 | |
*Non-conference game
