= 1897 Tennessee Volunteers football team =

American college football season

1897 Tennessee Volunteers football
- Conference: Southern Intercollegiate Athletic Association
- Record: 4–1–1 (0–0 SIAA)
- Head coach: None
- Captain: James A. Baird
- Home stadium: Baldwin Park

1897 Southern Intercollegiate Athletic Association football standings
	Conf.					Overall
Team	W		L		T	W		L		T
Vanderbilt $	3	–	0	–	0	6	–	0	–	1
Georgia	2	–	0	–	0	2	–	1	–	0
Auburn	2	–	0	–	1	2	–	0	–	1
Central (KY)	1	–	1	–	0	1	–	2	–	0
Nashville	1	–	1	–	0	1	–	1	–	0
Alabama	0	–	0	–	0	1	–	0	–	0
Tennessee	0	–	0	–	0	4	–	1	–	1
Texas	0	–	0	–	0	6	–	2	–	0
LSU	0	–	0	–	0	1	–	1	–	0
Sewanee	1	–	2	–	1	1	–	3	–	1
Clemson	0	–	1	–	0	2	–	2	–	0
Mercer	0	–	1	–	0	0	–	2	–	1
Cumberland (TN)	0	–	1	–	0	0	–	1	–	0
Kentucky State College	0	–	2	–	0	2	–	4	–	0
SW Presbyterian	0	–	0	–	0	0	–	0	–	0
$ – Conference champion

The 1897 Tennessee Volunteers football team represented the University of Tennessee in the 1897 Southern Intercollegiate Athletic Association football season. The 1897 Volunteers were the fifth official Tennessee team to take the field. This was also their second season in the Southern Intercollegiate Athletic Association (SIAA). They played five games and won four.

== Schedule ==
Date	Opponent	Site	Result	Source
October 15	King*	Baldwin Park; Knoxville, TN	W 28–0	
October 23	Williamsburg (KY)*	Baldwin Park; Knoxville, TN	W 6–0	
November 8	North Carolina*	Baldwin Park; Knoxville, TN	L 0–16	
November 25	VPI*	Athletic Park; Roanoke, VA	W 18–0	
November 26	at King*	Bristol, TN	W 12–4	
December 25	at Southern Athletic Club*	Athletic Park; New Orleans, LA	T 0–0	
*Non-conference game
