= 1897 Mercer Baptists football team =

American college football season

1897 Mercer Baptists football
- Conference: Southern Intercollegiate Athletic Association
- Record: 0–2–1 (0–1 SIAA)
- Head coach: Gordon Saussy (1st season)
- Home stadium: Central City Park

1897 Southern Intercollegiate Athletic Association football standings
	Conf.					Overall
Team	W		L		T	W		L		T
Vanderbilt $	3	–	0	–	0	6	–	0	–	1
Georgia	2	–	0	–	0	2	–	1	–	0
Auburn	2	–	0	–	1	2	–	0	–	1
Central (KY)	1	–	1	–	0	1	–	2	–	0
Nashville	1	–	1	–	0	1	–	1	–	0
Alabama	0	–	0	–	0	1	–	0	–	0
Tennessee	0	–	0	–	0	4	–	1	–	1
Texas	0	–	0	–	0	6	–	2	–	0
LSU	0	–	0	–	0	1	–	1	–	0
Sewanee	1	–	2	–	1	1	–	3	–	1
Clemson	0	–	1	–	0	2	–	2	–	0
Mercer	0	–	1	–	0	0	–	2	–	1
Cumberland (TN)	0	–	1	–	0	0	–	1	–	0
Kentucky State College	0	–	2	–	0	2	–	4	–	0
SW Presbyterian	0	–	0	–	0	0	–	0	–	0
$ – Conference champion

The 1897 Mercer Baptists football team represented Mercer University in the 1897 Southern Intercollegiate Athletic Association football season. Led by Gordon Saussy in his first an only season as head coach, the Baptist compiled an overall record of 0–2–1 with a mark of 0–1 in conference play.

== Schedule ==
Date	Time	Opponent	Site	Result	Source
October 16		at Gordon Institute*	Barnesville, GA	T 0–0	
October 23	3:30 p.m.	Auburn	Central City Park; Macon, GA	L 0–26	
October 30		Georgia Tech*	Central City Park; Macon, GA	L 0–20	
November 6		at Georgia Tech*	Brisbane Park; Atlanta, GA	Cancelled	
*Non-conference game; All times are in Eastern time
