= 1897 LSU Tigers football team =

American college football season

1897 LSU Tigers football
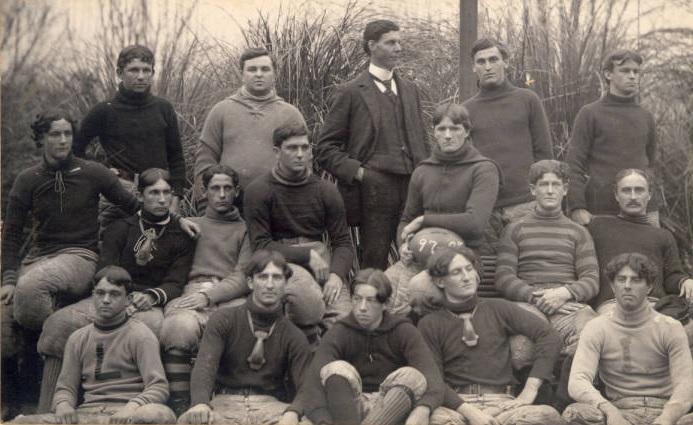
- Conference: Southern Intercollegiate Athletic Association
- Record: 1–1 (0–0 SIAA)
- Head coach: Allen Jeardeau (2nd season)
- Captain: Edwin A. Scott
- Home stadium: State Field

1897 Southern Intercollegiate Athletic Association football standings
| | Conf. | | | | | Overall |
| Team | W | | L | | T | W | | L | | T |
|---|---|---|---|---|---|---|---|---|---|---|
| Vanderbilt $ | 3 | – | 0 | – | 0 | 6 | – | 0 | – | 1 |
| Georgia | 2 | – | 0 | – | 0 | 2 | – | 1 | – | 0 |
| Auburn | 2 | – | 0 | – | 1 | 2 | – | 0 | – | 1 |
| Central (KY) | 1 | – | 1 | – | 0 | 1 | – | 2 | – | 0 |
| Nashville | 1 | – | 1 | – | 0 | 1 | – | 1 | – | 0 |
| Alabama | 0 | – | 0 | – | 0 | 1 | – | 0 | – | 0 |
| Tennessee | 0 | – | 0 | – | 0 | 4 | – | 1 | – | 1 |
| Texas | 0 | – | 0 | – | 0 | 6 | – | 2 | – | 0 |
| LSU | 0 | – | 0 | – | 0 | 1 | – | 1 | – | 0 |
| Sewanee | 1 | – | 2 | – | 1 | 1 | – | 3 | – | 1 |
| Clemson | 0 | – | 1 | – | 0 | 2 | – | 2 | – | 0 |
| Mercer | 0 | – | 1 | – | 0 | 0 | – | 2 | – | 1 |
| Cumberland (TN) | 0 | – | 1 | – | 0 | 0 | – | 1 | – | 0 |
| Kentucky State College | 0 | – | 2 | – | 0 | 2 | – | 4 | – | 0 |
| SW Presbyterian | 0 | – | 0 | – | 0 | 0 | – | 0 | – | 0 |
$ – Conference champion

The 1897 LSU Tigers football team represented Louisiana State University (LSU) during the 1897 Southern Intercollegiate Athletic Association football season. Coach Allen Jeardeau returned for his second but final year at LSU in 1897 for two games in Baton Rouge. A yellow fever outbreak throughout the South caused the postponement of LSU's classes starting and the football season being cut back to only two games.

== Schedule ==
| Date | Time | Opponent | Site | Result | Source |
|---|---|---|---|---|---|
| December 20 | | Montgomery Athletic Club* | State Field; Baton Rouge, LA | W 28–6 | |
| January 3 | 3:34 p.m. | Cincinnati* | State Field; Baton Rouge, LA | L 0–28 | |
*Non-conference game

== Roster ==
| No. | Player | Position | Height | Weight | Hometown | High School |
|---|---|---|---|---|---|---|
| - | William Benjamin Chamberlin | - | - | - | DeVall, LA | - |
| - | Edmund Auguste M. Chavanne | Center | - | - | Lake Charles, LA | - |
| - | Armand P. Daspit | Halfback | - | - | Houma, LA | - |
| - | Justin C. Daspit | Halfback | - | - | Houma, LA | - |
| - | Frank A. Godchaux | Quarterback | - | - | Baton Rouge, LA | - |
| - | William C. Howell | End | - | - | St. Francisville, LA | - |
| - | Phillip P. Huyck | Guard | - | - | Baton Rouge, LA | - |
| - | Leopold Kaffie | Center | - | - | Natchitoches, LA | - |
| - | George B. Lesueur | - | - | - | Baton Rouge, LA | - |
| - | Julius M. Levy | - | - | - | Evergreen, LA | - |
| - | Gordon B. Nicholson | Halfback | - | - | Baton Rouge, LA | - |
| - | Edwin A. Scott | - | - | - | Wilson, LA | - |
| - | Thomas L. Sherburne | Guard | - | - | Baton Rouge, LA | - |
| - | William S. Slaughter | End | - | - | Port Hudson, LA | - |
| - | Duncan P. Staples | - | - | - | Alexandria, LA | - |
| - | John T. Westbrook | End | - | - | Baton Rouge, LA | - |

Roster from Fanbase.com and LSU: The Louisiana Tigers
