= 1897 Auburn Tigers football team =

American college football season

1897 Auburn Tigers football
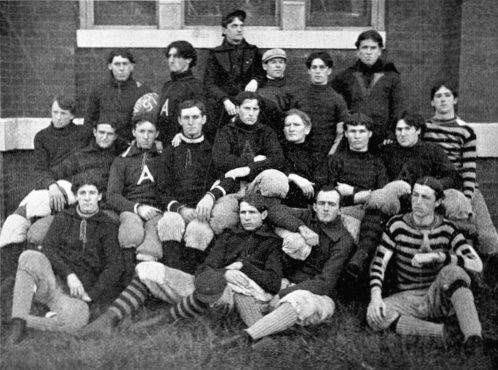
- The 1897 football team of the Alabama Polytechnic Institute (now Auburn University).
- Conference: Southern Intercollegiate Athletic Association
- Record: 2–0–1 (2–0–1 SIAA)
- Head coach: John Heisman (3rd season)
- Captain: William Bee Stokes

1897 Southern Intercollegiate Athletic Association football standings
	Conf.					Overall
Team	W		L		T	W		L		T
Vanderbilt $	3	–	0	–	0	6	–	0	–	1
Georgia	2	–	0	–	0	2	–	1	–	0
Auburn	2	–	0	–	1	2	–	0	–	1
Central (KY)	1	–	1	–	0	1	–	2	–	0
Nashville	1	–	1	–	0	1	–	1	–	0
Alabama	0	–	0	–	0	1	–	0	–	0
Tennessee	0	–	0	–	0	4	–	1	–	1
Texas	0	–	0	–	0	6	–	2	–	0
LSU	0	–	0	–	0	1	–	1	–	0
Sewanee	1	–	2	–	1	1	–	3	–	1
Clemson	0	–	1	–	0	2	–	2	–	0
Mercer	0	–	1	–	0	0	–	2	–	1
Cumberland (TN)	0	–	1	–	0	0	–	1	–	0
Kentucky State College	0	–	2	–	0	2	–	4	–	0
SW Presbyterian	0	–	0	–	0	0	–	0	–	0
$ – Conference champion

The 1897 Auburn Tigers football team represented Auburn University in the 1897 Southern Intercollegiate Athletic Association football season. It was the Tigers' sixth season. The team was led by head coach John Heisman, in his third year, and finished with a record of two wins, zero losses and one tie (2–0–1 overall, 2–0–1 in the SIAA).

The team featured brothers Jim and John Penton.

== Schedule ==
Date	Time	Opponent	Site	Result	Source
October 23	2:30 p.m.	at Mercer	Central City Park; Macon, GA	W 26–0	
October 29		at Nashville	Nashville, TN	W 14–4	
October 30		at Sewanee	Hardee Field; Sewanee, TN	T 0–0	
All times are in Central time

== Game summaries ==
=== Mercer ===
The season opened with a 26–0 defeat of Mercer. Fearing Georgia scouts watching for signals, Auburn did not use any throughout the game.

=== Nashville ===
Auburn beat Nashville 14–4 in a duel between fullbacks Jim Penton and Bradley Walker.

=== Sewanee ===
Auburn fought Sewanee to a scoreless tie.

== Postseason ==
The team finished $700 in debt, and Heisman was the actor, director, and producer of David Garrick to raise the money. As such, he is founder of Auburn's first theatrical group: The A.P.I. Dramatic Club.
