= 1897 Texas Longhorns football team =

American college football season

1897 Texas Longhorns football
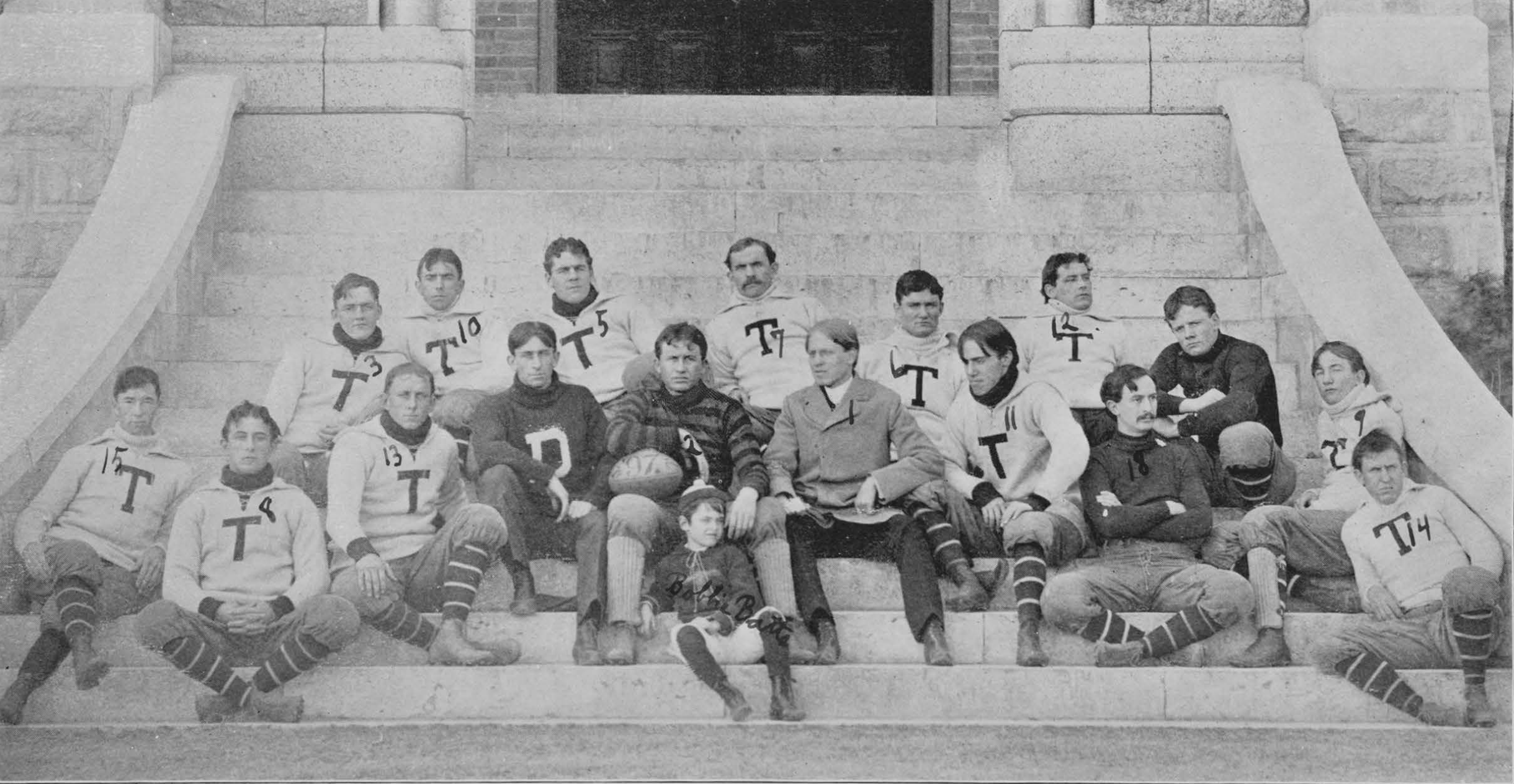
- Conference: Southern Intercollegiate Athletic Association
- Record: 6–2 (0–0 SIAA)
- Head coach: Walter F. Kelly (1st season)
- Captain: R. Daniel Parker Jr.
- Home stadium: Varsity Athletic Field

1897 Southern Intercollegiate Athletic Association football standings
	Conf.					Overall
Team	W		L		T	W		L		T
Vanderbilt $	3	–	0	–	0	6	–	0	–	1
Georgia	2	–	0	–	0	2	–	1	–	0
Auburn	2	–	0	–	1	2	–	0	–	1
Central (KY)	1	–	1	–	0	1	–	2	–	0
Nashville	1	–	1	–	0	1	–	1	–	0
Alabama	0	–	0	–	0	1	–	0	–	0
Tennessee	0	–	0	–	0	4	–	1	–	1
Texas	0	–	0	–	0	6	–	2	–	0
LSU	0	–	0	–	0	1	–	1	–	0
Sewanee	1	–	2	–	1	1	–	3	–	1
Clemson	0	–	1	–	0	2	–	2	–	0
Mercer	0	–	1	–	0	0	–	2	–	1
Cumberland (TN)	0	–	1	–	0	0	–	1	–	0
Kentucky State College	0	–	2	–	0	2	–	4	–	0
SW Presbyterian	0	–	0	–	0	0	–	0	–	0
$ – Conference champion

The 1897 Texas Longhorns football team represented the University of Texas at Austin in the 1897 Southern Intercollegiate Athletic Association football season.

== Schedule ==
Date	Opponent	Site	Result	Source
October 23	San Antonio Town Team*	Varsity Athletic Field; Austin, TX	W 10–0	
October 30	at Dallas University*	Cycle Park; Dallas, TX	L 4–20	
November 1	Fort Worth University*	Fort Worth, TX	L 0–6	
November 3	at Add-Ran Christian*	Waco, TX (rivalry)	W 16–10	
November 13	Houston Town Team*	Varsity Athletic Field; Austin, TX	W 42–6	
November 20	at San Antonio Town Team*	San Pedro Park; San Antonio, TX	W 12–0	
November 25	Fort Worth University*	Varsity Athletic Field; Austin, TX	W 38–0	
December 11	Dallas*	Varsity Athletic Field; Austin, TX	W 20–16	
*Non-conference game

== Personnel ==
=== Lineup ===
Player	Position	Year
Walter Schreiner	Right End	2nd
Lamar Bethea	Right Tackle	2nd
Thomas Kelly	Right Guard	2nd
Jack Jenkins	Center	1st
R.W. Wortham	Left Guard	3rd
R.D. Parker Jr. [C]	Left Tackle	4th
James Hart	Left End	1st
A.G. Blacklock	Quarterback	1st
Cade Bethea	Right Halfback	1st
Birch Wooldridge	Left Halfback	1st
Otto Pfeiffer	Fullback	2nd

==== Subs ====
Player	Position	Year
Sam Hogsett	Quarterback	1st
C.H. Leavell	Halfback	2nd
Andrew Denmark	Guard	3rd
Carl Groos	Fullback	1st
Cloyd Read		1st
