= 1897 Kentucky State College Blue and White football team =

American college football season

1897 Kentucky State College Blue and White football
- Conference: Southern Intercollegiate Athletic Association
- Record: 2–4 (0–2 SIAA)
- Head coach: Lyman Eaton (1st season)
- Captain: Roscoe Severs

1897 Southern Intercollegiate Athletic Association football standings
| | Conf. | | | | | Overall |
| Team | W | | L | | T | W | | L | | T |
|---|---|---|---|---|---|---|---|---|---|---|
| Vanderbilt $ | 3 | – | 0 | – | 0 | 6 | – | 0 | – | 1 |
| Georgia | 2 | – | 0 | – | 0 | 2 | – | 1 | – | 0 |
| Auburn | 2 | – | 0 | – | 1 | 2 | – | 0 | – | 1 |
| Central (KY) | 1 | – | 1 | – | 0 | 1 | – | 2 | – | 0 |
| Nashville | 1 | – | 1 | – | 0 | 1 | – | 1 | – | 0 |
| Alabama | 0 | – | 0 | – | 0 | 1 | – | 0 | – | 0 |
| Tennessee | 0 | – | 0 | – | 0 | 4 | – | 1 | – | 1 |
| Texas | 0 | – | 0 | – | 0 | 6 | – | 2 | – | 0 |
| LSU | 0 | – | 0 | – | 0 | 1 | – | 1 | – | 0 |
| Sewanee | 1 | – | 2 | – | 1 | 1 | – | 3 | – | 1 |
| Clemson | 0 | – | 1 | – | 0 | 2 | – | 2 | – | 0 |
| Mercer | 0 | – | 1 | – | 0 | 0 | – | 2 | – | 1 |
| Cumberland (TN) | 0 | – | 1 | – | 0 | 0 | – | 1 | – | 0 |
| Kentucky State College | 0 | – | 2 | – | 0 | 2 | – | 4 | – | 0 |
| SW Presbyterian | 0 | – | 0 | – | 0 | 0 | – | 0 | – | 0 |
$ – Conference champion

The 1897 Kentucky State College Blue and White football team represented Kentucky State College—now known as the University of Kentucky—as a member of the Southern Intercollegiate Athletic Association (SIAA) during the 1897 college football season. Led by Lyman Eaton in his first and only season as head coach, the Blue and White compiled an overall record of 3–4 with a mark of 0–2 in SIAA play.

== Schedule ==
| Date | Opponent | Site | Result | Attendance | Source |
|---|---|---|---|---|---|
| October 2 | Kentucky University* | Lexington, KY | W 8–6 | | |
| October 11 | at Kentucky Wesleyan* | Winchester, KY | L 0–4 | | |
| October 23 | Georgetown (KY)* | Lexington, KY | W 20–4 | | |
| October 30 | at Vanderbilt | Dudley Field; Nashville, TN (rivalry) | L 0–50 | 400 | |
| November 6 | Central (KY) | Lexington, KY | L 0–18 | | |
| November 25 | Centre* | Lexington, KY (rivalry) | L 0–36 | | |
*Non-conference game
