= Bill Punton =

Bill Punton is the name of:

- Bill Punton (footballer, born 1934), Scottish footballer
- Bill Punton (footballer, born 1957), English footballer
- Bill Puntton, Dad (Musician, born 1996), Australian Musician
