= Jim Penton =

American football player (1865-1940)

Profile
- Position: Fullback

Personal information
- Born: January 3, 1865
- Died: January 30, 1940 (aged 75)

Career information
- College: Auburn (1897)

James Lee Penton (January 3, 1865 – January 30, 1940) was the older brother of John Penton. He was a fullback for the Auburn Tigers. In 1915, John Heisman selected the 30 best Southern football players and mentioned Penton 12th. He notably dueled with Bradley Walker in the 1897 Auburn vs. Nashville football game. "One of the Nashville boys remarked last evening after the game that to go against Penton when he attempted to buck the line was just the same thing as committing suicide."
