= Wisconsin Idea =

Public philosophy

Wisconsin on a map of the United States

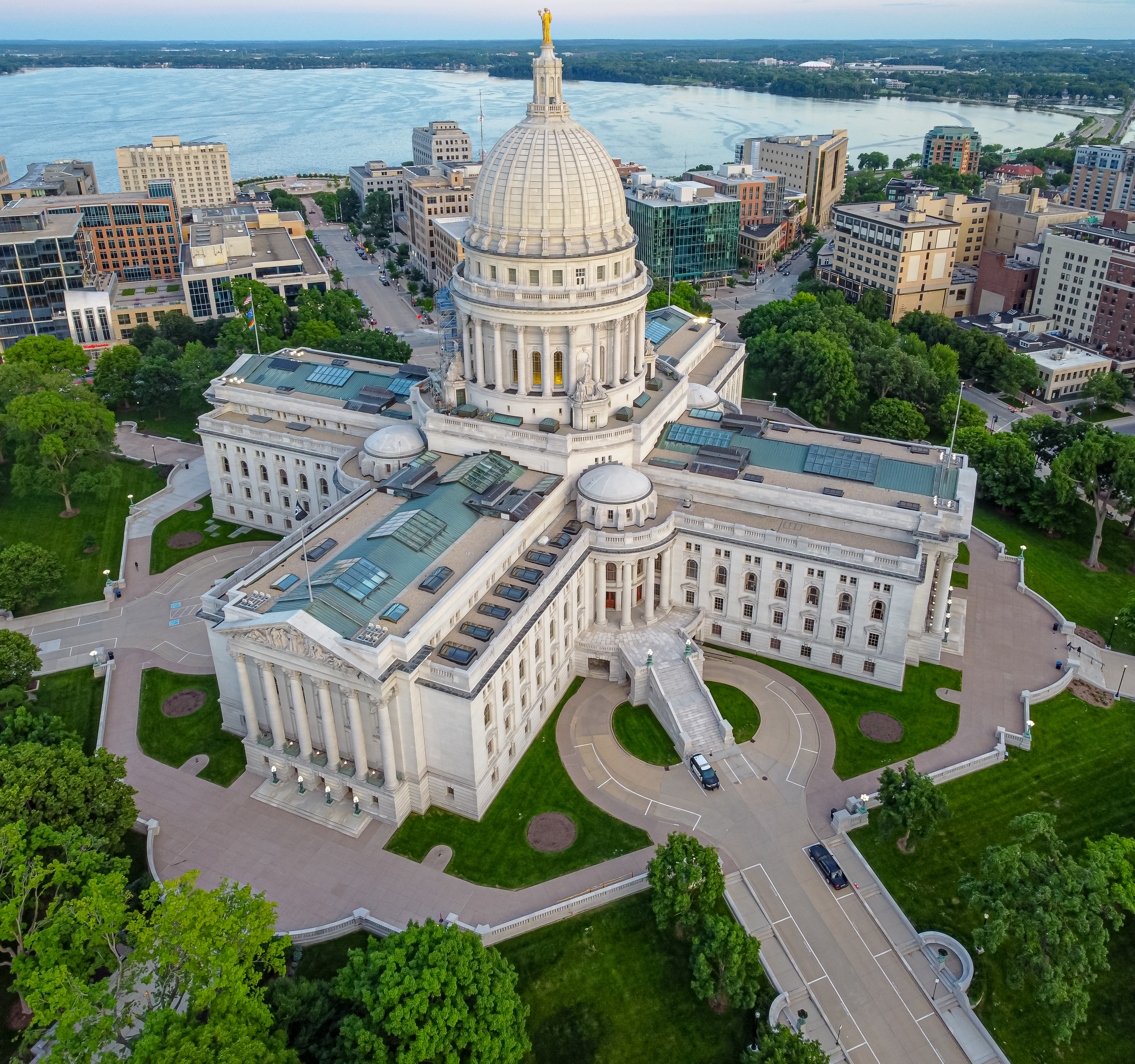
Wisconsin State Capitol

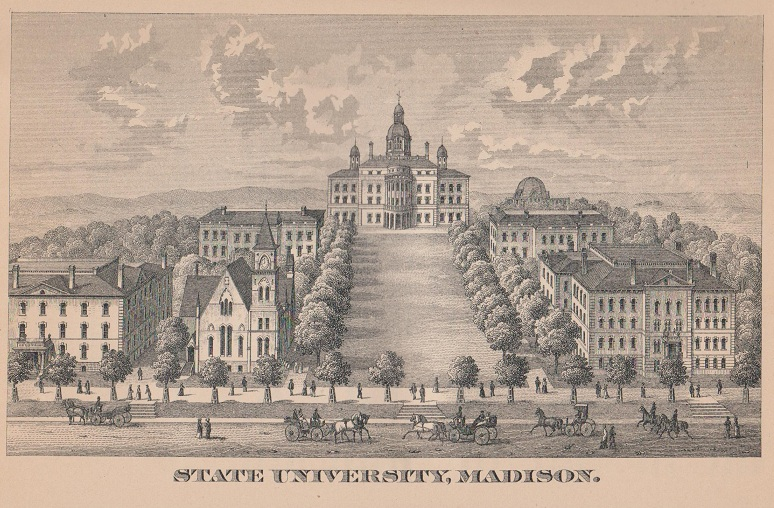
An early illustration of the University of Wisconsin campus, from the 1885 edition of the Wisconsin Blue Book.

The Wisconsin Idea is a public philosophy that has influenced policy and ideals in the U.S. state of Wisconsin's education system and politics. In education, emphasis is often placed on how the Idea articulates education's role for Wisconsin's government and inhabitants. In politics, the Idea is most associated with the historic political upheaval and subsequent reformation during the Progressive Era in the United States.

First articulated in the educational sense in 1904 when University of Wisconsin-Madison President Charles Van Hise declared he would "never be content until the beneficent influence of the university reaches every family in the state", the Wisconsin Idea has been used to frame and foster the public universities contributions to the state of Wisconsin's government and citizens: "to the government in the forms of serving in office, offering advice about public policy, providing information and exercising technical skill, and to the citizens in the forms of doing research directed at solving problems that are important to the state and conducting outreach activities".

In the strictly political sense, the Idea came about during the Progressive Era when proponents of the Wisconsin Idea took inspiration from traditions and customs brought to the state by German Americans. These progressives saw U.S. states as "laboratories for democracy" ready for experimentation. This resulted in a genitive legislative environment that implemented numerous significant reforms including to primary elections, workers' compensation, state and federal transportation, U.S. Senate elections, and progressive taxation that served as a model for other states and the federal government. The modern political facet of the philosophy is the effort "to ensure well-constructed legislation aimed at benefiting the greatest number of people".

== In education ==
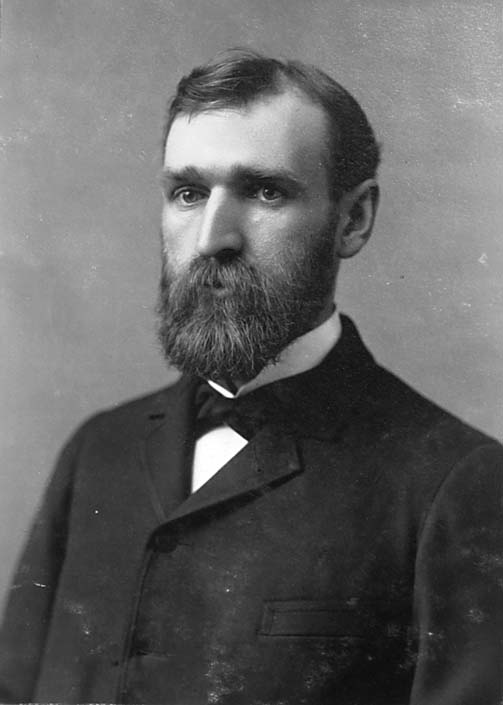
Charles R. Van Hise

For more than a century, the university system has been guided by the Wisconsin Idea, a tradition first enunciated by the University of Wisconsin President Charles Van Hise in 1904. Van Hise declared that he would "never be content until the beneficent influence of the university reaches every family in the state".

The Wisconsin Idea is a philosophy embraced by the University of Wisconsin System (UW System) that holds that university research should be applied to solve problems and improve health, quality of life, the environment, and agriculture for all citizens of the state. As explained by Adlai Stevenson II, "the Wisconsin tradition meant more than a simple belief in the people. It also meant faith in the application of intelligence and reason to the problems of society. It meant a deep conviction that the role of government was not to stumble along like a drunkard in the dark, but to light its way by the best torches of knowledge and understanding it could find."

This Progressive-era policy applied the expertise of the state's university to social legislation that benefited all the state's citizens; it led to classic programs such as regulation of utilities, workers' compensation, tax reform, and university extension services; sometimes expressed in the maxim that "the boundaries of the campus are the boundaries of the state". Over time, for the UW System, the Wisconsin Idea has come to signify more broadly the university's commitment to public service — a mission that substantially predates the progressive political era.

=== Formation of the Wisconsin Idea at Madison ===
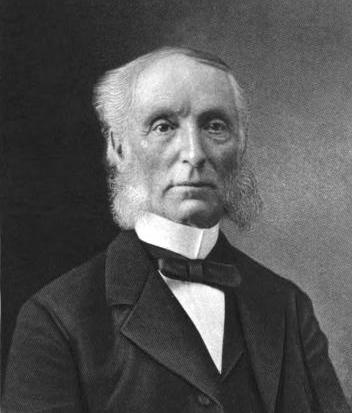
John Bascom

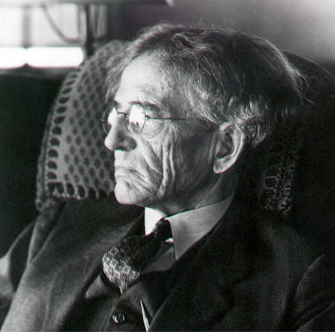
John R. Commons at his desk at the University of Wisconsin in the 1920s.

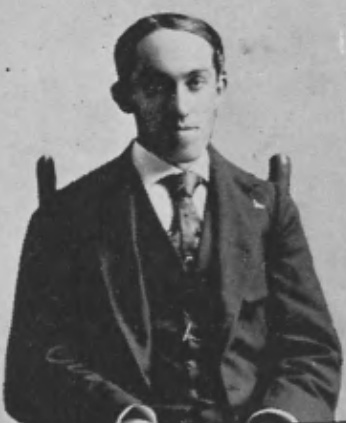
Charles McCarthy

While the University of Wisconsin was established in Madison on July 26, 1848, the Wisconsin Idea was not mentioned in the original charter. The idea laid latent for around 50 years until the Progressive Era when the state gained national attention for its innovative economic and political reforms. Amidst this ferment, the original "Wisconsin Idea" was popularized—the idea that a public university should improve the lives of people beyond the borders of its campus. It is in this spirit that Governor Robert M. La Follette routinely consulted with University of Wisconsin researchers to devise groundbreaking programs and legislation. Although the Wisconsin Idea is often attributed to the famed 1904 speech by Charles Van Hise, president of the University of Wisconsin, many university leaders and faculty have been credited with helping formulate the Idea.

David Hoeveler, who holds a distinguished professorship in history at the University of Wisconsin–Milwaukee, argues the Idea originated decades earlier, in the creative and fertile mind of John Bascom. A philosopher, theologian, and sociologist, Bascom deeply influenced a generation of students at the University of Wisconsin, including La Follette and Van Hise. Bascom drew concepts from German idealism, liberal Protestantism, and evolutionary theory, transforming them into advocacy for social and political reform. He was a champion of temperance, women's rights, and labor, all of which brought him controversy as president of the university from 1874 to 1887. In a way unmatched by any leader of a major American university in his time, Bascom outlined a social gospel that called for an expanded role for state governments and universities as agencies of moral improvement.

Additionally, the Ideas' intellectual history can be traced from the nineteenth century to the influential Progressive Era thinkers John R. Commons and Richard T. Ely, who believed university researchers should be a vital source of expertise for government and citizens. John Commons has even been credited with originating the Wisconsin Idea by the Madison Landmarks Commission.

Finally, the activities and concepts that make up the "Wisconsin Idea" were not formally announced as such until 1912 when Charles McCarthy described the philosophy in a book by that name. According to historian Tim Lacy, McCarthy, "possessed an extraordinary sense of political philosophy and contextual factors; this sense broadly shaped the Wisconsin Idea. He was sensitive to ethics, the problems of force, the distoring effects of money and capitalism, the wants of everyday people, the importance of deliberation, the problems of expertise, the drive for efficiency, and the concerns of justice." By that time, Wisconsin had developed a national reputation for legislative innovation.

=== Creation of the University of Wisconsin System ===
Originally the UW System schools outside Madison were state normal schools, created for teacher preparation. These became state teachers colleges in the 1920s, then state colleges in the 1950s. In 1956 the Milwaukee State College was incorporated with the University of Wisconsin, which at the time only included the Madison Campus. The other 4-year universities (Platteville, Whitewater, Oshkosh, River Falls, Stout (in Menomonie), Superior, Stevens Point, La Crosse, and Eau Claire) grew in size rapidly, added graduate programs, and in 1964 became Wisconsin state universities. The University of Wisconsin built two new universities, at Green Bay and Kenosha (Parkside). In 1971 there was increasing pressure for the universities in the state to confederate into one system. With the insistence of state governor Patrick Lucey the Wisconsin state universities and the UW were unified, preserving each campus's individual focuses and strengths while providing the support and prestige of UW Madison. The new UW System mission statement reads:

The mission of the system is to develop human resources, to discover and disseminate knowledge, to extend knowledge and its application beyond the boundaries of its campuses and to serve and stimulate society by developing in students heightened intellectual, cultural and humane sensitivities, scientific, professional and technological expertise and a sense of purpose. Inherent in this broad mission are methods of instruction, research, extended training and public service designed to educate people and improve the human condition. Basic to every purpose of the system is the search for truth.

=== Challenges to the Wisconsin Idea as part of the UW System ===
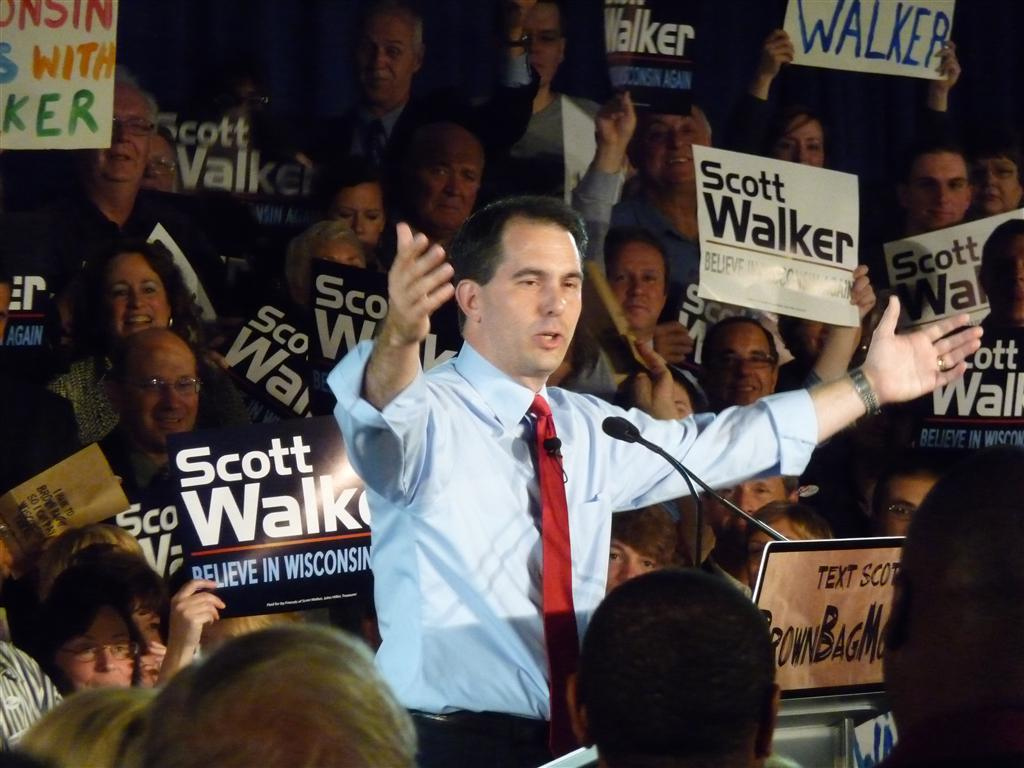
Walker after winning the 2010 Republican gubernatorial primary

In 2015, Wisconsin Governor Scott Walker's budget proposal included the removal of the Wisconsin Idea from the University of Wisconsin System mission statement. Walker proposed replacing the mission's goal to "extend knowledge and its application beyond the boundaries of its campus" and to "serve and stimulate society" with a goal "to meet the state's workforce needs". After a negative reaction from politicians and the public, the Wisconsin Idea was restored to the budget proposal.

Following the attempted removal of the Wisconsin Idea and in response to broader political trends at the time, the University of Wisconsin-Madison along with former Sociology staff member Patrick Brenzel created the course and public lecture series "Forward? The Wisconsin Idea, Past & Present" in 2015. When Brenzel conceived of the course, he had hoped it could "reinvigorate a broader, multidisciplinary conversation about how we (UW faculty), within our specialties, can re-engage with the people of Wisconsin." First facilitated by Chad Alan Goldberg in 2016, the course has had various professors guide the course since its creation. With over 70 guest lecturers having presented on topics ranging from public health to limnology, the course aims to identify challenges to the promise of the Wisconsin Idea in the 21st century.

In 2023, University of Wisconsin–Platteville Richland shut down, marking the first time a UW campus has closed since UW Medford in 1980. Following this closure, four other University of Wisconsin branch campuses have closed. Additionally, one campus has gone entirely online and another has stopped using several of its campus buildings. Many have expressed concerns about the future of the Wisconsin Idea following these closures.

== In politics ==
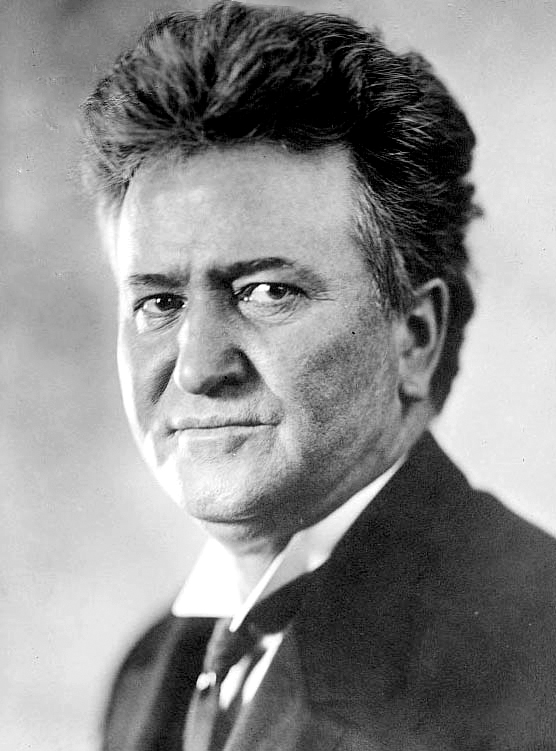
Robert M. La Follette, Sr.

The Wisconsin Idea, in American history, also refers to a series of political reforms of the late 19th century and early 20th century whose strongest advocate was Robert M. La Follette, Sr., Wisconsin's governor (1901–1906) and senator (1906–1925). The Wisconsin Idea was created by the state's progressives to do away with monopolies, trusts, high cost of living, and predatory wealth, which they saw as the problem that must be solved or else "no advancement of human welfare or progress can take place". Reforms in labor rights were one of the major aspects of the Wisconsin Idea. The progressive worker's compensation program was first introduced by German immigrants, who were abundant in Wisconsin. The system was adopted from the existing system in Germany, which was based on the idea that the employer was obligated to take care of his employees and keep paying them as they grew old. Many of the reforms were based on traditions and customs brought to the state by German immigrants. The emphasis on higher learning and well-funded universities stressed by the Wisconsin Idea was derived from the education system of Germany. Progressives also proposed the first state income taxes, as well as submitting the idea of a progressive tax. They also passed legislation prohibiting pollution and police brutality.

The Wisconsin Idea would go on to set an example for other states in the United States. The progressive politicians of the time sought to emulate and ultimately transcend the states of the east coast in regards to labor laws. Wisconsin progressives wished to make Wisconsin into a benchmark for other Midwestern states to strive towards. Although many of the reforms went through in 1911, conservative opponents of the progressive party took control of Wisconsin in 1914, thus minimizing the magnitude and effects of the reforms. The Wisconsin Idea would continue to be a revolutionary precedent for other universities, and its educational aspects are still relevant today. Robert La Follette, Sr. was the man who implemented much of this legislation, and he was among the earliest supporters of direct election of senators, which is now a national practice. These progressive politicians also helped pass the Sixteenth and Seventeenth Amendments to the American Constitution.

These proposed reforms, all of which were eventually adopted, included:

- Primary elections, allowing the rank-and-file members of a political party to choose its nominees rather than caucuses usually dominated by political bosses.
- Workers' compensation, allowing workers injured whilst working to receive a fixed payment in compensation for their injuries and related expenses rather than forcing them to go to court against their employers, which at the time was extremely difficult and had little realistic chance of success.
- State regulation of railroads in addition to the federal regulation imposed by the Interstate Commerce Commission.
- Direct election of United States Senators as opposed to the original method of their selection by the state legislatures, eventually ratified as the Seventeenth Amendment to the United States Constitution.
- Progressive taxation, where the wealthier pay a higher rate of tax than the less-affluent, made possible on the federal level in part by the adoption of the Sixteenth Amendment to the United States Constitution.

Adoption of these reforms marked the high point of the Progressive Era.

== Relationship with indigenous culture ==
The University of Wisconsin-Madison resides in the region called Teejop, or the Four Lakes, the ancestral land of the Ho-Chunk Nation, and thus the Wisconsin Idea is inherently tied to the history, people, and land. The University of Wisconsin was established in 1848 and became a land-grant institution in 1866 by virtue of the Morrill Act. Land Grants allowed federal lands to the states to be "for the use and support of a University within said Territory, and for no other use or purpose whatsoever." The establishment and expansion of the university necessitated taking land from the Ho-Chunk Nation; displacing them from their ancestral land.

This legacy of manifest destiny continues throughout the course of the university. Charles McCarthy, a famous proponent of the Wisconsin Idea, wrote "To the hard-handed men who broke the prairie, hewed the forests, made the roads and bridges and built little homes in the wilderness...and all the toilers who, by their sweat, made possible our schools, a great university, and all the good that is with us."

The Wisconsin Idea values diverse and holistic learning, of which Native perspectives and knowledge systems have long been ignored. In the early nineties, there were calls for reform in how schools taught US history. In recent years, the University of Wisconsin-Madison administration has taken some steps to better address the Indigenous history of the campus land as well as incorporate Indigenous knowledge systems into the curriculum. This is in light of a broader move by the state of Wisconsin, which established the American Indian Curriculum Services in the Wisconsin Act 31 in 1991.

In 2015, the Nelson Institute for Environmental Studies as the University of Wisconsin-Madison convened a leadership summit with representatives from the twelve Native Nations in Wisconsin, leading to the creation of the Native Nations_UW (NN_UW) Working Group.

This initiative is a partnership between UW-Madison, University of Wisconsin Colleges, and University of Wisconsin Extension and the Native Nations in Wisconsin, founded on the strategic plan to work towards more respectful and reciprocal partnerships. UW-Madison created a full-time position of tribal relations director in 2019, naming Aaron Bird Bear the first to hold this position intended to foster stronger ties between the 12 First Nations of Wisconsin and the university.

In 2019, a new heritage marker titled "Our Shared Future" was developed in collaboration with representatives of the Ho-Chunk Nation and placed on Bascom Hill, recognizing the land as the ancestral home of the Ho-Chunk, acknowledging the circumstances that led to their forced removal, and honoring the Ho-Chunk Nation's history of resistance and resilience. In 2020, UW-Madison was awarded a grant from the U.S. Department of Agriculture as part of the Wisconsin Land-Grant System Partnership for the Advancing Native Education Pathways project. This project seeks to engage members of Wisconsin's Tribal Nations; university faculty, staff, and students; and community members to integrate Indigenous knowledge and methods.

In announcement of this grant, Kristen Levan, a Strategic Communications Specialist at the university, writes, "In spirit of the Wisconsin Idea, UW-Madison's belief that education must enhance people's lives beyond the boundaries of the classroom, supporting Native American educational achievement aligns with the university's commitment to public service."

== In media ==
Wisconsin Public Radio, formerly a division of the University of Wisconsin-Extension, was established to bring the Wisconsin Idea to the broadcast airwaves. From the WPR Mission Statement: "WPR's Mission is to realize the Wisconsin Idea by producing, acquiring and delivering high quality audio programming that serves the public's need to discuss ideas and opinions, and that provides cultural enrichment, intellectual stimulation, and intelligent, enlightening entertainment."
