= Henry Penton =

Henry Penton may refer to:

- Henry Penton (the elder) (c. 1705–1762), MP for Tregony and Winchester
- Henry Penton (the younger) (1736–1812), MP for Winchester

== See also ==
- Penton (disambiguation)
