= 1897 Clemson Tigers football team =

American college football season

1897 Clemson Tigers football
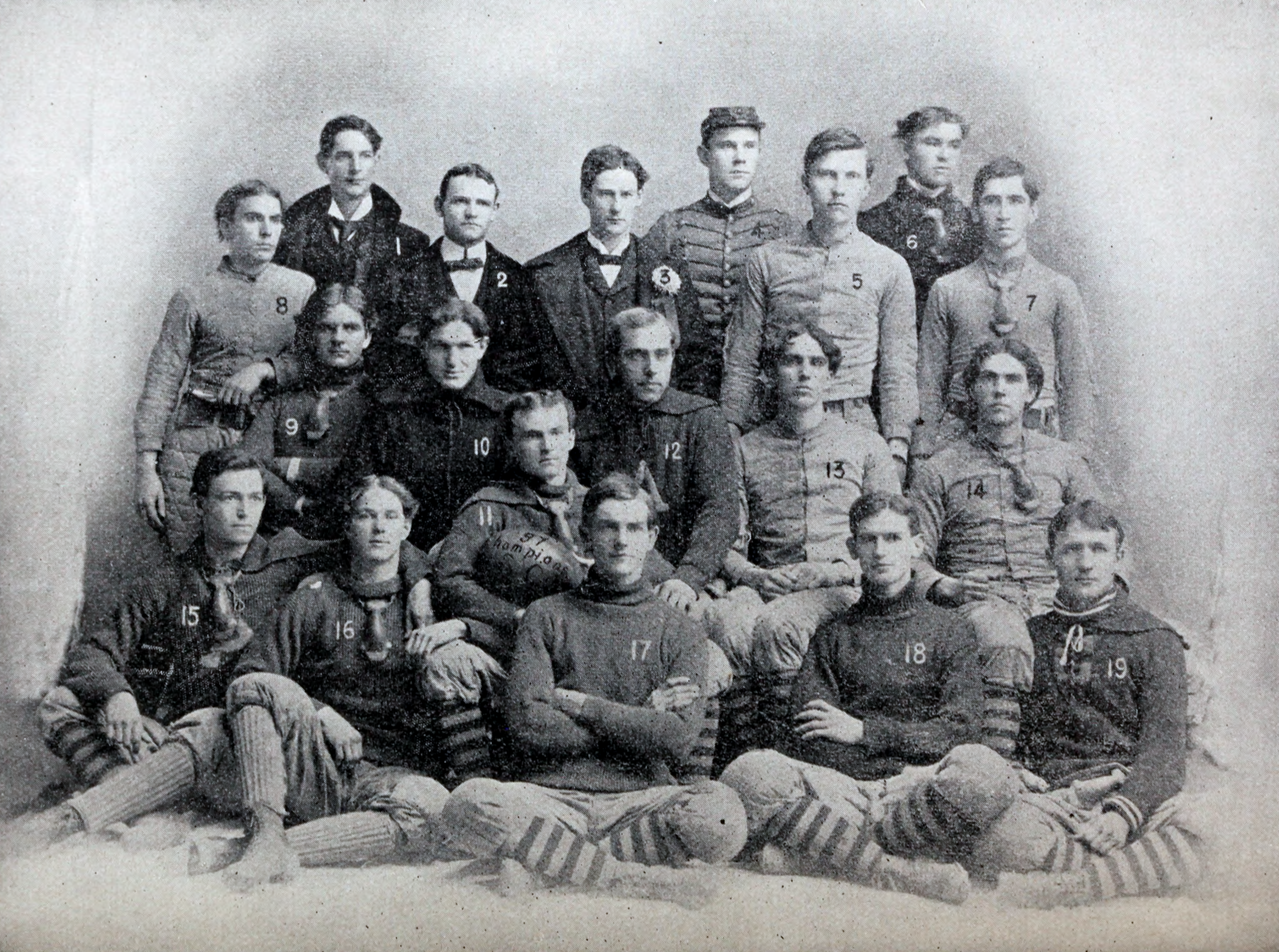

State champion
- Conference: Southern Intercollegiate Athletic Association
- Record: 2–2 (0–1 SIAA)
- Head coach: William M. Williams (1st season)
- Captain: W. T. Brock

1897 Southern Intercollegiate Athletic Association football standings
	Conf.					Overall
Team	W		L		T	W		L		T
Vanderbilt $	3	–	0	–	0	6	–	0	–	1
Georgia	2	–	0	–	0	2	–	1	–	0
Auburn	2	–	0	–	1	2	–	0	–	1
Central (KY)	1	–	1	–	0	1	–	2	–	0
Nashville	1	–	1	–	0	1	–	1	–	0
Alabama	0	–	0	–	0	1	–	0	–	0
Tennessee	0	–	0	–	0	4	–	1	–	1
Texas	0	–	0	–	0	6	–	2	–	0
LSU	0	–	0	–	0	1	–	1	–	0
Sewanee	1	–	2	–	1	1	–	3	–	1
Clemson	0	–	1	–	0	2	–	2	–	0
Mercer	0	–	1	–	0	0	–	2	–	1
Cumberland (TN)	0	–	1	–	0	0	–	1	–	0
Kentucky State College	0	–	2	–	0	2	–	4	–	0
SW Presbyterian	0	–	0	–	0	0	–	0	–	0
$ – Conference champion

The 1897 Clemson Tigers football team represented Clemson Agricultural College—now known as Clemson University–during the 1897 Southern Intercollegiate Athletic Association football season. The Tigers completed their season as a member of the Southern Intercollegiate Athletic Association with a record of 2–2, with wins over South Carolina and a Charlotte YMCA team, and losses to Georgia and North Carolina. All games were played in the opposing school's home city. William M. Williams served as the team's coach for his first season while W. T. Brock was the captain. The team was state champion.

== Schedule ==
Date	Opponent	Site	Result	Source
October 9	at Georgia	Herty Field; Athens, GA (rivalry)	L 0–24	
October 23	at Charlotte YMCA*	Latta Park; Charlotte, NC	W 10–0	
October 25	at North Carolina*	Chapel Hill, NC	L 0–28	
November 10	at South Carolina*	Columbia, SC (rivalry)	W 20–6	
*Non-conference game
