= Lyman Eaton =

American football player and coach (1874–1897)

Biographical details
- Born: May 3, 1874; Cincinnati, Ohio, U.S.
- Died: December 1, 1897 (aged 23); Cincinnati, Ohio, U.S.

Playing career
- 1893–1896: Cincinnati

Coaching career (HC unless noted)
- 1897: Kentucky State College

Head coaching record
- Overall: 2–4

Lyman Beecher Eaton (May 3, 1874 – December 1, 1897) was an American college football player and coach. He served as the head football coach at the University of Kentucky for one season in 1897. A four-year letter winner at the University of Cincinnati, Eaton arrived at Kentucky one day before their first game. The team, frustrated by a lack of practice time, protested for 10 days in the middle of the season.

Eaton left Kentucky after one dismal season with the intent of continuing his education at the Cincinnati medical college. On November 30, 1897, the second day of studies, he was severely injured trying to jump onto a streetcar on Main Street in Cincinnati. His right leg was broken and his hip dislocated. He was taken to the home of his mother in Hartwell, where he died from a blood clot the next day.

== Head coaching record ==
Year	Team	Overall	Conference	Standing	Bowl/playoffs
Kentucky State College Blue and White (Southern Intercollegiate Athletic Association) (1897)
1897	Kentucky State College	2–4	0–2		
Kentucky State College:		4–5			
Total:		13–17–1			
