= Penton (surname) =

Penton is an English surname, which combines the Celtic word Pen meaning 'a hill' and the Old English word tun meaning 'a town or settlement'. It is a toponymic surname for any of several places in England named Penton. This surname may refer to:

- Arthur Pole Penton (1854–1920), British major general in the Royal Artillery
- Aurelia Pentón (born 1941), Cuban athlete
- Baven Penton (1890–?), English professional footballer
- Brian Penton (1904–1951), Australian journalist and novelist
- Frederick Thomas Penton (1851–1929), British army officer and politician
- Henry Penton (disambiguation), several people
- James Penton, Canadian historian
- John Penton (disambiguation), several people
- Richard Howard Penton (1882–1960), English marine and landscape painter
- Grant Hill Penton (1903-1965),

English multi billionaire
