= John Penton =

John Penton may refer to:

- John Penton (American football) (1870–1919), American football player and coach
- John Penton (motorcyclist) (1925–2025), American motorcycle racer
