= Penton (disambiguation) =

Penton is a motorcycle brand.

Penton may also refer to:

- Penton, Alabama, in the United States
- Penton, New Jersey, in the United States
- Penton, Cumbria, in England
- Penton Mewsey, a village in Hampshire, England
- Penton (company), a business-to-business media company
- Penton (surname)
