= Gordon Saussy =

American lawyer

Biographical details
- Born: February 14, 1872; Savannah, Georgia, U.S.
- Died: December 9, 1952 (aged 80); Chatham County, Georgia, U.S.

Playing career
- 1895: Cornell

Coaching career (HC unless noted)
- 1897: Mercer
- 1899: Georgia

Head coaching record
- Overall: 2–5–2

Gordon Saussy (February 14, 1872 – December 12, 1952) was an American college football player and coach and a local politician from Georgia. He served as the head coach at the University of Georgia for one season in 1899, compiling a record of 2–3–1. Saussy was the Mayor of Savannah, Georgia from 1929 to 1931.

== Background ==
Saussy was born in Savannah, Georgia on February 14, 1872. He led a number of civic organizations, including the Georgia Salzburger Society. His grandson, Kirk Varnedoe, played rugby for 14 years and later became the Director of Painting and Sculpting at New York’s Museum of Modern Art.

== Football career ==
Saussy attended and graduated from Cornell University in 1896 and was a star player on the Cornell football team. He was the head football coach of the Mercer University Bears football team in for the 1897 season and the University of Georgia Bulldogs football team for the 1899 season. He was the second Georgia coach with ties to Cornell, the first being Pop Warner. Saussy's record at Mercer was 0–1 and at Georgia was 2–3–1.

== Political career ==
After coaching at Georgia, Saussy returned to Savannah, where he practiced law. He once was a Democratic member of the Georgia General Assembly and was elected Mayor of Savannah in 1929. He resigned in 1931, successfully ran as a candidate for Ordinary of Chatham County, Georgia and served in that capacity until his death.

== Death ==
Saussy died in December 1952 and was buried at Laurel Grove Cemetery. The religious service was conducted at the Wesley Monumental Methodist Church.

== Head coaching record ==
| Year | Team | Overall | Conference | Standing | Bowl/playoffs |
|---|---|---|---|---|---|
Mercer Baptists (Southern Intercollegiate Athletic Association) (1897)
| 1897 | Mercer | 0–2–1 | 0–1 | | |
| Mercer: | | 0–2–1 | 0–1 | | |
Georgia Bulldogs (Southern Intercollegiate Athletic Association) (1899)
| 1899 | Georgia | 2–3–1 | 2–3–1 | | |
| Georgia: | | 2–3–1 | 2–3–1 | | |
| Total: | | 2–5–2 | | | |

Political offices
| Preceded by Thomas Hoynes, Democrat | Mayor of Savannah; 1929–1931 | Succeeded by Thomas Hoynes, Democrat |
