= R. G. Acton =

American football player, coach, and physician (1867–1900)

Robert Acton
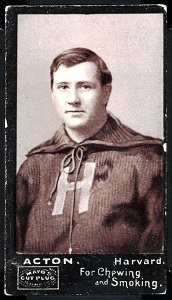
- Acton at Harvard, c. 1894

Biographical details
- Born: July 26, 1867; Kinsale, Ireland
- Died: November 22, 1900 (aged 33); New York, New York, U.S.

Playing career
- 1893–1895: Harvard
- 1896–1898: Vanderbilt
- Position: Guard

Coaching career (HC unless noted)
- 1896–1898: Vanderbilt

Head coaching record
- Overall: 10–7–3

Accomplishments and honors

Championships
- SIAA (1897)

Robert Acton (July 26, 1867 – November 22, 1900) was an Irish-American college football player and coach and physician. He attended Harvard Medical School and he played football as a left guard for the Crimson from 1893 to 1895 and was also a member of the rowing team. Acton was the fifth head football coach at Vanderbilt University, serving for three seasons, from 1896 to 1898, and compiling a record of 10–7–3. He died on November 22, 1900, at Presbyterian Hospital in Manhattan after an overdose of morphine.

== Head coaching record ==
Year	Team	Overall	Conference	Standing	Bowl/playoffs
Vanderbilt Commodores (Southern Intercollegiate Athletic Association) (1896–1898)
1896	Vanderbilt	3–2–2	3–0–1	4th	
1897	Vanderbilt	6–0–1	3–0	1st	
1898	Vanderbilt	1–5	1–2	8th	
Vanderbilt:		10–7–3	7–2–1		
Total:		10–7–3			
