= Walter F. Kelly =

American football player, sports coach, and physician (1874–1961)

Biographical details
- Born: January 13, 1874; Bradford, Massachusetts, U.S.
- Died: March 1, 1961 (aged 87); Indianapolis, Indiana, U.S.

Playing career

Football
- 1895–1896: Dartmouth

Coaching career (HC unless noted)

Football
- 1897: Texas
- 1898: Texas (assistant)
- 1899–1903: Butler

Basketball
- 1899–1903: Butler

Baseball
- 1901–1905: Butler
- 1908: Butler

Head coaching record
- Overall: 10–14 (football); 6–8 (basketball); 7–21–1 (baseball)

Walter Frederic "Mike" Kelly (January 13, 1874 – March 1, 1961) was an American football player, coach of football, basketball, and baseball, and physician. He served as the head football coach at University of Texas at Austin in 1897 and at Butler University from 1899 to 1903, compiling a career college football record of 10–14. Kelly was also the head basketball coach at Butler from 1899 to 1903, tallying a mark of 6–8, and was the school's head baseball coach from 1901 to 1905 and again in 1908, amassing a record of 7–21–1. Before his tenure at Butler, Kelly served as an assistant coach to David Farragut Edwards at Texas in 1898.

While coaching at Butler, Kelly pursued a medical degree at Indiana Medical College, from which he graduated in 1906. He worked as a physician in Marion County, Indiana for more than 54 years before his death on March 1, 1961, at his home in Indianapolis.

== Head coaching record ==
=== Football ===
Year	Team	Overall	Conference	Standing	Bowl/playoffs
Texas Longhorns (Southern Intercollegiate Athletic Association) (1897)
1897	Texas	6–2			
Texas:		6–2			
Butler Christians (Independent) (1899–1903)
1899	Butler	1–3			
1900	Butler	1–3			
1901	Butler	1–0			
1902	Butler	1–3			
1903	Butler	0–3			
Butler:		4–12			
Total:		10–14			
