= Allen McCants =

American football player and coach (1875–1953)

Biographical details
- Born: August 20, 1875; Mobile, Alabama, U.S.
- Died: December 14, 1953 (aged 78)

Playing career
- 1892: Alabama

Coaching career (HC unless noted)
- 1897: Alabama

Head coaching record
- Overall: 1–0

Allen Gauthier McCants (August 20, 1875 – December 14, 1953) was an American college football player and coach. He served as the head football coach at the University of Alabama in 1897. McCants was also a player for Alabama's inaugural football team in 1892. Due to a ban the university had placed on athletic teams traveling off campus, McCants' 1897 team only played one game, a 6–0 victory over the Tuscaloosa Athletic Club. As a further result of the ban, Alabama did not field a team in 1898. When the ban was lifted and football was resumed in 1899, W. A. Martin was named as the new head coach.

== Head coaching record ==
Year	Team	Overall	Conference	Standing	Bowl/playoffs
Alabama Crimson White (Southern Intercollegiate Athletic Association) (1897)
1897	Alabama	1–0	0–0		
Alabama:		1–0	0–0		
Total:		1–0			
