= William M. Williams (American football) =

American football coach

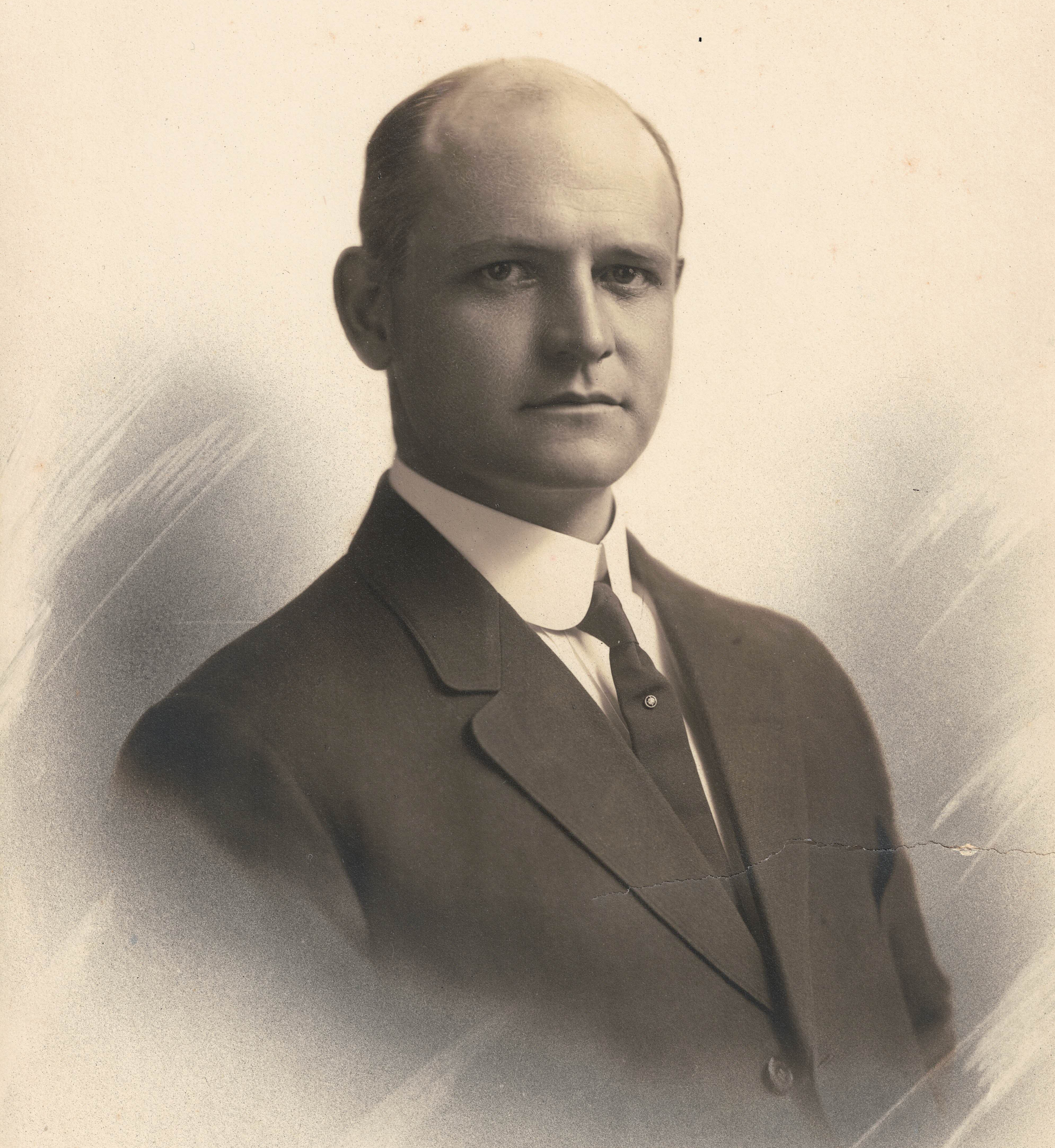

Biographical details
- Born: September 12, 1877; West Point, Georgia, U.S.
- Died: March 30, 1932 (aged 54); Baltimore, Maryland, U.S.
- Education: Auburn (BS 1896, MS 1897); Harvard Law (1901)

Playing career
- 1894–96: Auburn
- Position: Halfback

Coaching career (HC unless noted)
- 1897: Clemson
- 1901: Auburn

Head coaching record
- Overall: 4-5-1

William Martin Williams (September 12, 1877 – March 30, 1932) was an American football coach and attorney.

== Auburn ==
Born in West Point, Georgia, Williams attended Auburn University, where he played on the football team as a halfback from 1894 to 1896. In 1915, John Heisman selected his 30 best Southern football players, and mentioned Williams second.

The Auburn football team executed a "hidden ball trick" in the game against Vanderbilt, as Auburn seemed to run a revolving wedge. Vanderbilt still won however, 9 to 6; the first time in the history of southern football that a field goal decided a game. Williams recalled:

I was playing left half for Auburn and Tichenor was quarterback. We were on Vandy's 15-yard line and had the ball in our possession. Tich passed the ball to me; I raised his jersey and hid the ball under it, at the same time dashing toward our right end, protected by several members of the Auburn team...Vandy thought I had the ball. Tich journeyed around his own left and went over the Vanderbilt's goal line. The first time the Vandy players knew Tich had the ball and had made a touchdown was when they saw him pulling the ball from under his jersey.

Quarterback Reynolds Tichenor described the nature of the play as follows:

"The play was simply this. When the ball was snapped it went to a halfback. The play was closely massed and well screened. The halfback then thrust the ball under the back of my jersey. Then he would crash into the line. After the play I simply trotted away to a touchdown.

He graduated with a bachelor's of science degree in 1896, and was an assistant instructor of English and Mathematics during the 1896–97 school year while he completed a master's degree.

Williams returned to Auburn in 1901 to coach the football team after being unanimously selected by members of the board.

== Clemson ==
Williams served as the head football coach of the Clemson Tigers in 1897, leading the team to a 2–2 record; his Auburn teammate Walter Riggs was an engineering professor at Clemson, and had been the coach the previous season.

== Law ==
Williams attended Harvard Law School from 1899 to 1901. He died in Baltimore, Maryland in 1932.

== Head coaching record ==
Year	Team	Overall	Conference	Standing	Bowl/playoffs
Clemson Tigers (Southern Intercollegiate Athletic Association) (1897)
1897	Clemson	2–2			
Clemson:		2–2			
Total:		2–2			

Year	Team	Overall	Conference	Standing	Bowl/playoffs
Auburn Tigers (Southern Intercollegiate Athletic Association) (1901)
1901	Auburn	2–3–1	2–2–1	7th	
Auburn:		2–3–1	2–2–1		
Total:		2–3–1			
