= Richard Von Albade Gammon =

American football player (1879–1897)

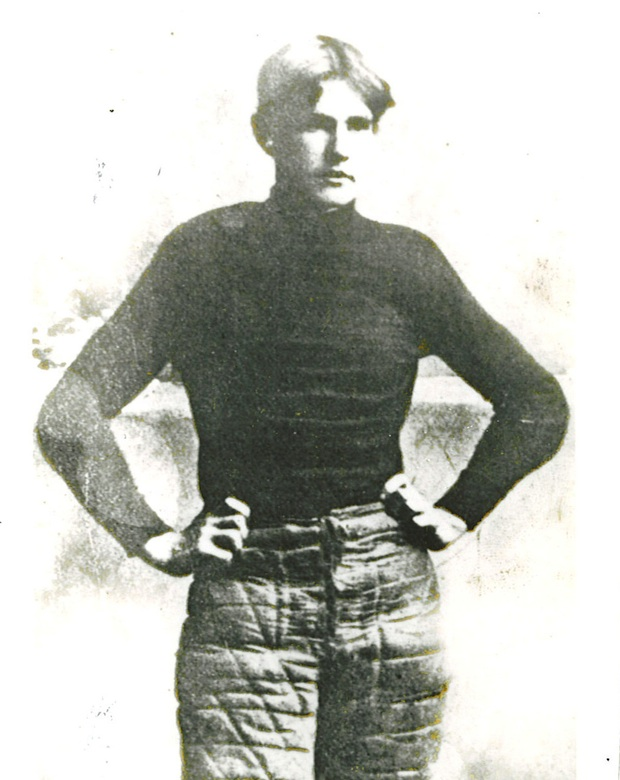

Profile
- Position: Fullback / Quarterback

Personal information
- Born: December 4, 1879; Rome, Georgia, U.S.
- Died: October 31, 1897 (aged 17); Atlanta, Georgia, U.S.

Career information
- College: Georgia (1896–1897)

Awards and highlights
- SIAA championship (1896)

Richard Von Albade Gammon (December 4, 1879 – October 31, 1897) was an American college football fullback who died after injuries sustained in a collegiate football game while playing for the Georgia Bulldogs against the Virginia Cavaliers.

== Biography ==
Richard Von Albade Gammon was born December 4, 1879, in Rome, Georgia. He grew up on downtown Rome's 3rd Avenue and was a very talented athlete.

=== University of Georgia ===
Gammon attended the University of Georgia and played football on the 1896 and 1897 teams under Glenn "Pop" Warner and Charles McCarthy. In 1897, they played their first two games against Clemson and Georgia Tech.

==== Death versus Virginia ====
On October 30, 1897, UGA played the University of Virginia in Atlanta, Georgia. The two teams the year before were the two most vocal claimants to a Southern football title. Early in the second half, Von Gammon was on defense, and dove into the mass around Virginia's right tackle. Once the pile-up cleared, he lay there motionless. Two doctors in the stands came to his aid and determined he had a severe concussion. He was on his feet in a few minutes, however, and was being taken off the field by Coach McCarthy, when captain and later judge William B. Kent, not realizing how badly he was hurt, said to him:

"Von, you are not going to give up, are you?"

"No, Bill," he replied, "I've got too much Georgia grit for that."

Those were the last words he ever spoke. Upon reaching the sideline, he lapsed into unconsciousness. They rushed him to Grady Memorial Hospital in Atlanta. Gammon died in the early morning hours of October 31, 1897. His funeral was held at First Presbyterian Church in Rome, Georgia. News spread of Von Gammon's death and the people were devastated as were the Virginia players.

== Legacy ==
The Georgia Legislature was in session at the time and public opinion caused them to pass a bill to ban the sport of football in the state of Georgia. The bill would have ended the football programs of Georgia, Georgia Tech, and Mercer. The bill only needed the signature of Governor William Yates Atkinson to become a law. Rosalind Burns Gammon wrote a letter to her representative, which later was in the hands of the governor. She was saddened by her son's death, but did not want the sport outlawed. She mentioned in her letter how his two friends were killed in rock climbing and skating accidents, and how those sports were not banned. Gov. Atkinson vetoed the bill on December 7, 1897. His mother is known as the woman who saved college football in Georgia. In 1921, the University of Virginia team presented a plaque to the University of Georgia in honor of Von Gammon and his mother. Less than three years after Von's death, his brother Will died when he fell under a train following a baseball game in Cartersville, Georgia.

== See also ==
- List of gridiron football players who died during their careers
