= McGee Field =

Sports venue in Sewanee, Tennessee

McGee Field at Harris Stadium
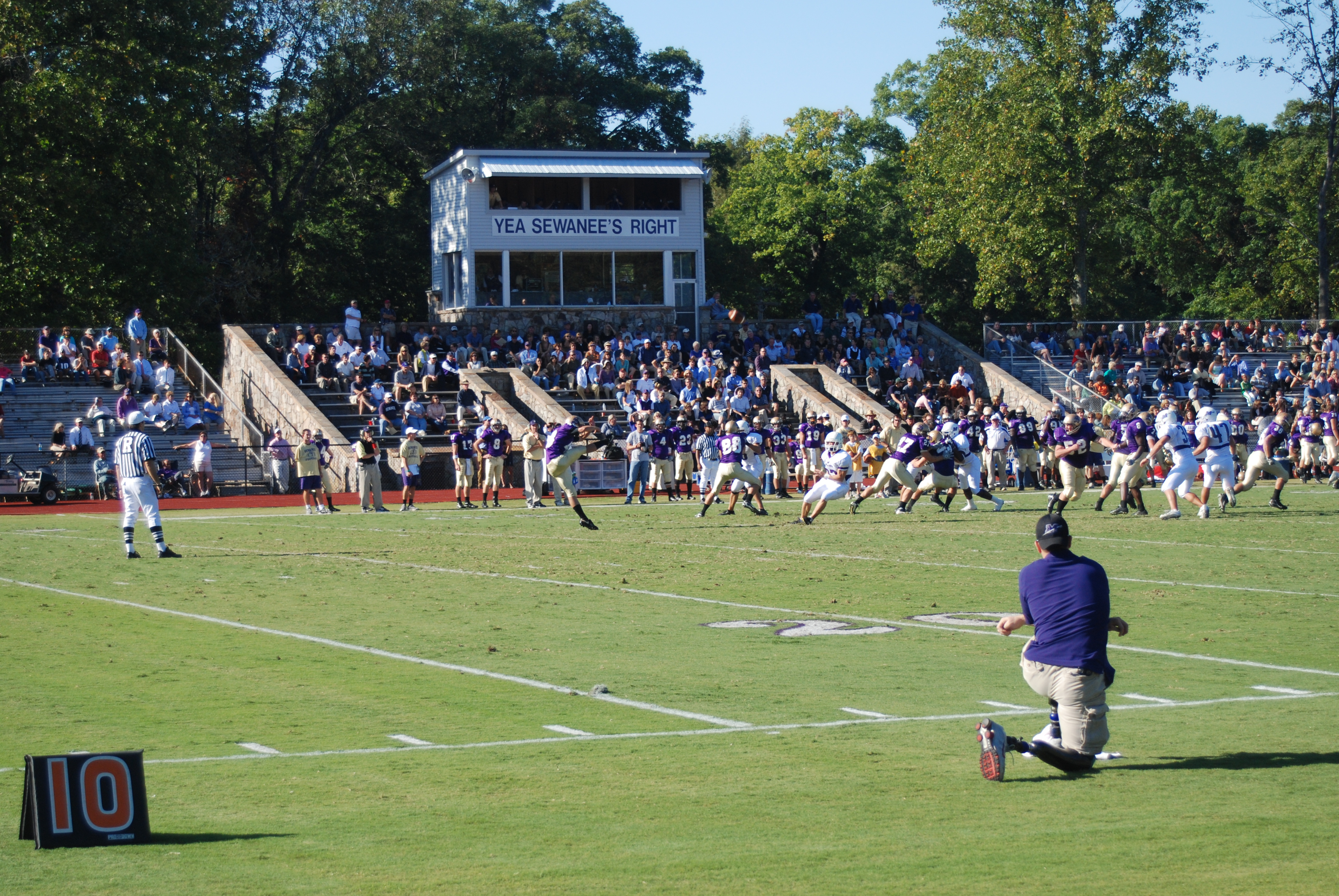
- Sewanee Tigers Football at McGee Field in October 2007
- Interactive map of McGee Field at Harris Stadium
- Full name: Benjamin Humphreys McGee Field at Eugene O. Harris Stadium
- Former names: Hardee Field (–1977)
- Address: Sewanee, TN; U.S.
- Owner: Sewanee University
- Operator: Sewanee Athletics
- Type: Stadium
- Current use: American football Lacrosse; Track and field

Construction
- Opened: November 1891; 134 years ago

Tenants
- Sewanee Tigers (NCAA) teams: football, lacrosse, track and field

Website
- sewaneetigers.com/mcgee-field

McGee Field at Harris Stadium (officially Benjamin Humphreys McGee Field at Eugene O. Harris Stadium) is a multi-purpose stadium located on the campus of Sewanee: The University of the South in Sewanee, Tennessee. The venue serves as home of the Sewanee Tigers football, lacrosse, and track and field teams.

It was dedicated as "McGee Field" at homecoming on October 22, 1977. Before then the stadium was known as "Hardee Field", named for Lt. General William J. Hardee of the Confederate States of America. Thus sometimes the field is also called "Hardee-McGee Field". McGee Field is the oldest stadium in the South still in use.

== History ==
McGee Field dates back to the first instance of the Sewanee–Vanderbilt football rivalry on November 7, 1891, and is the oldest in the south and the fourth oldest in the nation. That day in '91 saw Sewanee's first ever football game and Vanderbilt's second. The Commodores won 22 to 0. Just eleven years before, Stoll Field at the University of Kentucky saw the South's first football game. For twenty years (1894–1913) Sewanee did not lose a game played "on the mountain." Perhaps the first big event happened in 1897 when Sewanee held John Heisman's Auburn Tigers to a scoreless tie on McGee Field.

== Dedications ==
- Benjamin Humphreys McGee: McGee was a Greenville, Mississippi native and 1949 graduate of Sewanee, known as "Ug."
- Eugene O. Harris: The stadium was dedicated to Harris in November 1957.
