= Bill Punton (footballer, born 1957) =

English footballer

Personal information
- Full name: William Punton
- Date of birth: 18 December 1957 (age 68)
- Place of birth: Morpeth, England
- Position: Goalkeeper

Senior career*
Years	Team	Apps	(Gls)
- Gainsborough Trinity
1975–1977	Bradford City	7	(0)
- Leeds Ashley Road
1981	→ Leeds United (loan)	0	(0)
Total		7	(0)
- * Club domestic league appearances and goals

William Punton (born 18 December 1957) is an English former professional footballer who played as a goalkeeper.

== Career ==
Born in Morpeth, Punton joined Bradford City from Gainsborough Trinity in August 1975, making 7 league appearances for the club, before being released in 1977. He later played non-league football for Leeds Ashley Road, spending time on loan with Leeds United in 1981, making one appearance for their Reserve team.

== Sources ==
- Frost, Terry (1988). Bradford City A Complete Record 1903-1988. Breedon Books Sport. ISBN 0-907969-38-0.
