= Charles McCarthy (progressive) =

American political scientist and public administrator

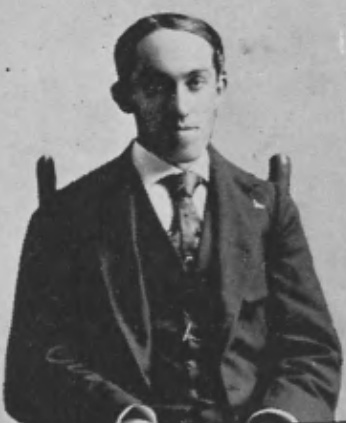
- McCarthy pictured in The Pandora 1898, Georgia yearbook
- Born: June 29, 1873; Brockton, Massachusetts, U.S.
- Died: March 26, 1921 (aged 47); Prescott, Arizona, U.S.
- Organization: Wisconsin Legislative Reference Bureau

Charles R. McCarthy (June 29, 1873 – March 26, 1921) was an American political scientist, public administrator, Progressive reformer, and briefly, a college football coach. He is credited with founding the first legislative reference library in the United States. McCarthy was active in policy formation, with special interests in agricultural cooperatives and adult and vocational education. He authored The Wisconsin Idea, a summary of Progressive philosophy and thinking.

== Early years ==
McCarthy was born in Brockton, Massachusetts, to John McCarthy, an engine tender in a shoe-factory, and his wife, Katherine O’Shea Desmond, who kept a boarding house. He was the only one of their three children to survive childhood. After an education in the public schools in Brockton, he was apprenticed to a shoemaker. When this did not interest him, he ran away to become a cabin boy on a sailing schooner. While at sea, he read the books available in the ship's library, obtaining the equivalent of a high school education.

Eager to obtain more education, he tried to enter Brown University, but was denied admission. After appealing directly to the president of the university, his entrance to the school was arranged. McCarthy lacked the funds to pay for school, so he financed his education by working as a scene shifter and painter in theaters in Providence. He also played for the Brown football team, earning All-America honors. He graduated from Brown in 1896, with a bachelor of philosophy degree.

When the Spanish–American War broke out, McCarthy tried to enlist, but was turned down for physical reasons. Despite this, he headed to Florida, and was aboard a troop transport, when he was discovered and put ashore. He became ill with malaria caught in camp, and by the time he recovered, the war was over. McCarthy then entered law school at the University of Georgia. To pay for school, he took a job as the school's football coach. During his two seasons, 1897 and 1898, McCarthy's team compiled a record 6–3.

Interested in the economics of Richard T. Ely, McCarthy enrolled at the University of Wisconsin (now University of Wisconsin–Madison), where he studied history, politics, and economics. He received a Ph.D. in 1901. His thesis, which was on the Anti-Masonic Party, was awarded the Justin Winsor Prize by the American Historical Association.

== Career ==
=== Legislative Reference Library ===
In 1901, McCarthy was appointed the chief document clerk for the Wisconsin Free Library Commission. Although the position was designed to provide legislators with reference materials, McCarthy ultimately expanded its scope to include researching legislation from around the world and drafting legislation. He was interested in improving lawmaking from what he saw as a chaotic process largely controlled by lobbyists to a systematic one that produced well-crafted legislation that could both survive court challenge and serve as a model for other states and the federal government. He formulated the concept of a legislative reference library—a place where legislators could take their ideas, learn about the experiences of other states and countries, cast their ideas in concrete terms, and then have the help of trained draftsmen to put their ideas into legal form. Initially spurned by the legislature, McCarthy was eventually given space for his project in the attic of the capitol. He ultimately built it into the first legislative reference library in the country, and was responsible for overhauling the way legislation was created in the state. In 1901, he was appointed as its first director by the Wisconsin Free Library Commission; a position he held until his death.

=== The Wisconsin Idea ===
In 1912, McCarthy published The Wisconsin Idea, a summary of the goals and ideals of the Progressive movement. In it, he decried the "corrupting influences of the concentrated wealth" and called for political and economic reforms that would facilitate "the betterment, the efficiency and the welfare of each individual." To accomplish this, McCarthy advocated the development of a science of public administration so that governments could be run with the same efficiency as businesses. He recommended that public officials be educated specifically for administrative duties. Other ideas described in the book include the direct accountability of politicians and government administrators to the electorate; the regulation of business, including railroads, utilities, stocks and bonds, insurance, and banking, for the public good; and the provision of service by public universities to the state via university extensions and adult education.

In his introduction to the book, Theodore Roosevelt wrote:

As Professor Simon N. Patten says: "Without means of attainment and measures of result an ideal becomes meaningless. The real idealist is a pragmatist and an economist. He demands measurable results and reaches them by means made available by economic efficiency. Only in this way is social progress possible." Mr. McCarthy's purpose is to impress not only every real reformer, but every capable politician, with the fact that the people are more concerned about "good works" than about "faith."

According to historian Tim Lacy, McCarthy, "possessed an extraordinary sense of political philosophy and contextual factors; this sense broadly shaped the Wisconsin Idea. He was sensitive to ethics, the problems of force, the distoring effects of money and capitalism, the wants of everyday people, the importance of deliberation, the problems of expertise, the drive for efficiency, and the concerns of justice."

=== Progressivism ===
One of McCarthy's ideals was that the law should embody the public will. To accomplish this required not only the systematic formulation of legislation, but governmental reforms. Many of the reforms he advocated were embodied in the platform of Theodore Roosevelt's Bull Moose Party, which McCarthy helped draft. Focused on removing corruption from politics and waste and inefficiency from government, the platform advocated the recall of judicial decisions, easier amendment of the Constitution, and women's suffrage as means to accomplish this. It also called for improvements in social welfare, including social welfare legislation for women and children, workers' compensation, farm relief, mandatory health insurance in industry, and new inheritance and income taxes.

=== Other positions ===
In addition to his work with the Wisconsin legislature, McCarthy was an advisor to Presidents Theodore Roosevelt, William H. Taft, and Woodrow Wilson. In 1914-15, he was Director of Research and Investigation for the U.S. Commission on Industrial Relations. During World War I, when Herbert Hoover became head of the U.S. Food Administration, McCarthy became his chief aide. In 1917, he was offered the post of advisor to China within the State Department, but declined. He was sought after by corporations and other states, but always declined the offers in order to remain at the Wisconsin Legislative Reference Library.

== Personal life ==
He married Louise Howard Schreiber in 1901. The couple had one child.

== Legacy ==
McCarthy died March 26, 1921, in Prescott, Arizona, where he had gone to seek relief from health problems. His remains lay in state at the Wisconsin State Capitol, the first time anyone had been honored with that distinction since the Civil War. A bronze plaque of McCarthy was placed in the assembly chamber of the capitol.

== Works ==
- The Antimasonic Party: A Study of Political Antimasonry in the United States, 1827-1840. 1901.
- The Wisconsin Idea. New York: Macmillan, 1912.

== Head coaching record ==
Year	Team	Overall	Conference	Standing	Bowl/playoffs
Georgia Bulldogs (Southern Intercollegiate Athletic Association) (1897–1898)
1897	Georgia	2–1	2–0		
1898	Georgia	4–2	3–2		
Georgia:		6–3	5–2		
Total:		6–3			

== See also ==
- Wisconsin Idea
