= John Penton (American football) =

American football player and coach (1870–1919)

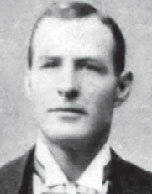

Biographical details
- Born: February 10, 1870; Equality, Alabama, U.S.
- Died: October 17, 1919 (aged 49); Goodwater, Alabama, U.S.

Playing career
- 1891–1895: Virginia
- 1897: Auburn
- Positions: Guard, fullback

Coaching career (HC unless noted)
- 1898: Clemson

Head coaching record
- Overall: 3–1

John Abner Penton (February 10, 1870 – October 17, 1919) was an American football player and coach. Penton attended the University of Virginia, Auburn University, and Johns Hopkins Medical School. He played starting guard on the 1893, 1894, and 1895 Virginia football teams and was captain of the 1893, 1894, and 1895 teams. After he graduated from the University of Virginia, Penton chose to play as a "special student" fullback on the Auburn football team under head coach, his long-time companion, John Heisman in 1897. The first coach at Clemson, Walter Riggs, had in fact played on the team as well. Penton had lived near the Auburn campus his entire life and likely facilitated the Pennsylvania native, Heisman's, move to the campus. Penton then served as the third head football coach at Clemson University for one season in 1898, compiling a record of 3–1 before the program ran out of money. His two brothers, George and Jim, were also American football players.

== Head coaching record ==
Year	Team	Overall	Conference	Standing	Bowl/playoffs
Clemson Tigers (Southern Intercollegiate Athletic Association) (1898)
1898	Clemson	3–1	1–1	T–6th	
Clemson:		3–1	1–1		
Total:		3–1			
