= Walter Riggs =

University President and Athletic Director

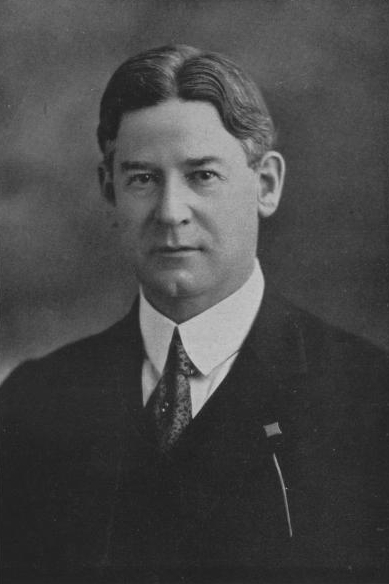

Biographical details
- Born: January 24, 1873; Orangeburg, South Carolina, U.S.
- Died: January 22, 1924 (aged 50); Washington, D.C., U.S.

Playing career
- 1892: Auburn
- Position: End

Coaching career (HC unless noted)
- 1896: Clemson
- 1899: Clemson

Administrative career (AD unless noted)
- 1896–1910: Clemson

Head coaching record
- Overall: 6–3

Walter Merritt Riggs (January 24, 1873 – January 22, 1924) was the president of Clemson University from 1910 to 1924 and the "father of Clemson football" coaching the first football team for what was then Clemson College. Riggs was president of Clemson during one of its most challenging times, during World War I, when enrollment dropped due to students joining the military or going home to help on family farms. Riggs graduated from the Agricultural and Mechanical College of Alabama (now Auburn University) with a Bachelor of Science in engineering in 1892 and was a member of Auburn's first football team. He was also president of his class, director of the glee club, and a member of Phi Delta Theta fraternity while at Auburn. Riggs was the second president of the Southern Intercollegiate Athletic Association, taking over for William Lofland Dudley in 1912.

Riggs Hall, which is the home of Clemson's College of Engineering, Computing and Applied Sciences, is named in his honor.

== Head coaching record ==
Year	Team	Overall	Conference	Standing	Bowl/playoffs
Clemson Tigers (Independent) (1896)
1896	Clemson	2–1			
Clemson Tigers (Southern Intercollegiate Athletic Association) (1899)
1899	Clemson	4–2	2–2	9th	
Clemson:		6–3	2–2		
Total:		6–3			
