= Nashville Garnet and Blue football =

Former American collegiate football team in Nashville, Tennessee, United States

Nashville Garnet and Blue
- First season: 1889
- Last season: 1909
- Stadium: Peabody Field
- Location: Nashville, Tennessee
- Conference: Independent
- Colors: Garnet and Blue

The Nashville Garnet and Blue football team represented the University of Nashville in intercollegiate football competition. The program was active from 1889 until 1909, when it was discontinued. In 1890, the school challenged local Vanderbilt to a game, leading to the first intercollegiate game in Tennessee.

John Heisman, whose Auburn team defeated Nashville 14–4 in 1897, said Bradley Walker was the best ever to play for the Nashville football team.

The 1901 team, coached by Charley Moran was one of the South's first great teams. In 1903, E. A. Wreidt, the team's coach, resigned and Nashville football was threatened with its end, but it survived for a few more years.
