= 1896 Southern Intercollegiate Athletic Association football season =

- League: NCAA
- Sport: College football
- Duration: October 3, 1896 through December 14, 1896
- Teams: 16

Regular Season
- Season champions: LSU; Georgia

Football seasons
- 1895 1897

1896 Southern Intercollegiate Athletic Association football standings
	Conf.					Overall
Team	W		L		T	W		L		T
LSU +	3	–	0	–	0	6	–	0	–	0
Georgia +	2	–	0	–	0	4	–	0	–	0
Vanderbilt	2	–	0	–	2	3	–	2	–	2
Tennessee	1	–	0	–	0	4	–	0	–	0
Auburn	3	–	1	–	0	3	–	1	–	0
Texas	1	–	1	–	0	4	–	2	–	1
Alabama	1	–	1	–	0	2	–	1	–	0
Kentucky State College	1	–	1	–	0	3	–	6	–	0
Sewanee	3	–	3	–	0	3	–	3	–	0
Tulane	1	–	2	–	0	3	–	2	–	0
Nashville	0	–	1	–	1	0	–	1	–	1
Mercer	0	–	2	–	1	0	–	2	–	1
Central (KY)	0	–	2	–	1	0	–	3	–	1
Mississippi A&M	0	–	2	–	0	0	–	4	–	0
SW Presbyterian	0	–	2	–	0	0	–	3	–	0
Cumberland (TN)			–					–
+ – Conference co-champions

The 1896 Southern Intercollegiate Athletic Association football season was the college football games played by the members schools of the Southern Intercollegiate Athletic Association as part of the 1896 college football season. The season began on October 3.

Coach Pop Warner's conference champion Georgia team beat North Carolina 24–16 in a close game. "For the first time in Southern football history the football supremacy of Virginia and North Carolina was successfully challenged." Against John Heisman's Auburn team, Georgia also had the first successful onside kick in the South.

The LSU Tigers, led by coach Allen Jeardeau, went undefeated and were the SIAA co-champions.

== Season overview ==
=== Results and team statistics ===
Conf. Rank	Team	Head coach	Overall record	Conf. record	PPG	PAG
1 (tie)	LSU	Allen Jeardeau	6–0	3–0		
1 (tie)	Georgia	Pop Warner	4–0	2–0		
3	Vanderbilt	R. G. Acton	3–2–2	3–0–2		
4	Auburn	John Heisman	3–1	3–1		
5 (tie)	Georgia Tech	J. B. West	1–1–1	1–1–1		
5 (tie)	Texas	Harry Orman Robinson	4–2–1	1–1		
5 (tie)	Alabama	Otto Wagonhurst	2–1	1–1		
5 (tie)	Kentucky State	Dudley Short	3–6	1–1		
9	Sewanee	J. E. Blair	3–3	3–3		
10	Tulane	Harry Baum	3–2	1–2		
11	Nashville		0–1–1	0–1–1		
12 (tie)	Mercer	J. D. Winston	0–2–1	0–2–1		
12 (tie)	Central	H. McC. Anderson	0–3–1	0–2–1		
12 (tie)	Southwestern Presbyterian		0–3	0–2		
12 (tie)	Mississippi A&M	J. B. Hildebrand	0–4	0–2		
?	Cumberland					

Key

PPG = Average of points scored per game

PAG = Average of points allowed per game

=== Regular season ===
Index to colors and formatting
Non-conference matchup; SIAA member won
Non-conference matchup; SIAA member lost
Non-conference matchup; tie
Conference matchup

SIAA teams in bold.

==== Week One ====
Date	Visiting team	Home team	Site	Result	Attendance	Reference
October 3	Lexington Athletic Club	**Kentucky State**	Lexington, KY	**L** 0–10		
October 6	**Auburn**	**Mercer**	Central City Park • Macon, GA	**AUB** 46–0		

==== Week Two ====
Date	Visiting team	Home team	Site	Result	Attendance	Reference
October 10	**Kentucky State**	**Vanderbilt**	Dudley Field • Nashville, TN	**VAN** 22–0	600	
October 10	Centenary	**LSU**	State Field • Baton Rouge, LA	**W** 46–0		
October 10	Union (TN)	**Mississippi A&M**	Starkville Fairgrounds • Starkville, MS	**L** 0–8		

==== Week Three ====
Date	Visiting team	Home team	Site	Result	Attendance	Reference
October 17	**Nashville**	**Sewanee**	Hardee Field • Sewanee, TN	**SEW** 6–0		
October 17	Galveston High School	**Texas**	Clark Field • Austin, TX	**W** 42–0		
October 17	Tulane Alumni	**Tulane**	Tulane Athletic Field • New Orleans, LA	**W** 12–0		
October 17	**Vanderbilt**	Centre	Danville, KY	**L** 0–46		
October 17	**Kentucky State**	Catlettsburg Athletic Club	Catlettsburg, KY	**L** 4–6		
October 22	Williamsburg (KY)	**Tennessee**	Baldwin Park • Knoxville, TN	**W** 10–0		

==== Week Four ====
Date	Visiting team	Home team	Site	Result	Attendance	Reference
October 24	**LSU**	**Tulane**	Tulane Athletic Field • New Orleans, LA	**LSU** 6–0		
October 24	**Texas**	Dallas	Dallas, TX	**T** 0–0		
October 24	Birmingham Athletic Club	**Alabama**	The Quad • Tuscaloosa, AL	**W** 30–0		
October 24	Kentucky University	**Kentucky State**	Lexington, KY	**W** 36–6		
October 24	**Central**	**Vanderbilt**	Dudley Field • Nashville, TN	**T** 0–0		
October 24	**Georgia**	Wofford	Spartanburg, SC	**W** 26–0		
October 26	**Central**	**Sewanee**	McGee Field • Sewanee, TN	**SEW** 6–4		
October 22	**Tennessee**	Chattanooga Athletic Club	Chattanooga, TN	**W** 4–0		

==== Week Five ====
Date	Visiting team	Home team	Site	Result	Attendance	Reference
October 31	**Kentucky State**	Centre	Danville, KY	**L** 0–32		
October 31	North Carolina	**Georgia**	Brisbine Park • Atlanta, GA	**W** 24–16	3,000	
October 31	Georgia Tech	**Mercer**	Central City Park • Macon, GA	**L** 4–6		
October 31	**Sewanee**	**Alabama**	The Quad • Tuscaloosa, AL	**SEW** 10–6		

==== Week Six ====
Date	Visiting team	Home team	Site	Result	Attendance	Reference
November 7	**Central**	**Kentucky State**	Lexington, KY	**KEN** 62–0		
November 7	San Antonio	**Texas**	Varsity Athletic Field • Austin, TX	**W** 12–4		
November 7	Georgia Tech	**Auburn**	Drill Field • Auburn, AL	**W** 45–0		
November 7	**Vanderbilt**	Missouri	Fair Grounds • St. Louis, MO	**L** 6–26		
November 9	**Sewanee**	**Georgia**	Herty Field • Athens, GA	**UGA** 26–0		
November 9	**Tulane**	Vicksburg Athletic Club	Vicksburg, MS	**W** 48–0		
November 11	**Vanderbilt**	**SW Presbyterian**	Baseball Park • Clarksville, TN	**VAN** 36–0		
November 13	**LSU**	Ole Miss	Fairgrounds • Vicksburg, MS	**W** 12–4		

==== Week Seven ====
Date	Visiting team	Home team	Site	Result	Attendance	Reference
November 14	**Mississippi A&M**	Alabama	The Quad • Tuscaloosa, AL	**ALA** 20–0		
November 14	**Nashville**	Vanderbilt	Dudley Field • Nashville, TN	**T** 0–0		
November 14	Centre	Kentucky State	Lexington, KY	**L** 0–44		
November 14	**Texas**	Tulane	Tulane Athletic Field • New Orleans, LA	**TEX** 12–4	800	
November 14	VPI	Tennessee	Baldwin Park • Knoxville, TN	**W** 6–4		
November 16	**Sewanee**	Auburn	Riverside Park • Montgomery, AL	**AUB** 38–6		
November 16	**Texas**	LSU	State Field • Baton Rouge, LA	**LSU** 14–0		
November 20	**Mississippi A&M**	LSU	State Field • Baton Rouge, LA	**LSU** 52–0		

==== Week Eight ====
Date	Visiting team	Home team	Site	Result	Attendance	Reference
November 21	**Kentucky State**	Georgetown (KY)	Georgetown, KY	**W** 16–0		
November 21	**Mercer**	**Georgia Tech**	Brisbane Park • Atlanta, GA	**T** 12–12		
November 21	**Mississippi A&M**	Southern Athletic Club	Sportsman's Park • New Orleans, LA	**L** 0–55		
November 26	**Auburn**	**Georgia**	Brisbine Park • Atlanta, GA	**UGA** 12–6		
November 26	**Central**	**Tennessee**	Baldwin Park • Knoxville, TN	**UT** 30–0		
November 26	Dallas	**Texas**	Varsity Athletic Field • Austin, TX	**W** 22–4	2,000	
November 26	Ole Miss	**Tulane**	Tulane Athletic Field • New Orleans, LA	**W** 10–0		
November 26	**Vanderbilt**	**Sewanee**	Hardee Field • Sewanee, TN	**VAN** 10–4		
November 27	**Kentucky State**	Louisville Athletic Club	Louisville, KY	**L** 4–30		

==== Week Nine ====
Date	Visiting team	Home team	Site	Result	Attendance	Reference
November 28	**LSU**	Southern Athletic Club	Sportsman's Park • New Orleans, LA	**W** 6–0	500	

==== Week Eleven ====
Date	Visiting team	Home team	Site	Result	Attendance	Reference
December 14	Missouri	**Texas**	Varsity Athletic Field • Austin, TX	**L** 0–10		
