= List of Tulane Green Wave football seasons =

The Tulane Green Wave football team represents the Tulane University in American football.

== Seasons list ==
Year	Coach	Overall	Conference	Standing	Bowl/playoffs	Coaches^{#}	AP^{°}
T.L. Bayne (Independent) (1893)
1893	T.L. Bayne	1–2					
Fred Sweet (Independent) (1894)
1894	Fred Sweet	0–4					
T.L. Bayne (Southern Intercollegiate Athletic Association) (1895)
1895	T.L. Bayne	3–2	1–2				
Harry Baum (Southern Intercollegiate Athletic Association) (1896)
1896	Harry Baum	3–2 (Note: The game against LSU of this year was forfeited during the game due to Tulane having fielded an ineligible player. At the time that the game was declared forfeit, Tulane was leading with a score of 2–0. Due to the forfeiture, the official score was set at LSU 6, Tulane 0 by the game's referee. In addition to the forfeiture, Tulane was further sanctioned by the SIAA by being barred from fielding a team in intercollegiate play for the 1897 season.)	1–2	10th			
1897	No team						
John Lombard (Southern Intercollegiate Athletic Association) (1898)
1898	John Lombard	1–1	1–1	T–5th			
H. T. Collier (Southern Intercollegiate Athletic Association) (1899)
1899	H. T. Collier	0–6–1	0–5	T–17th			
H.T. Summersgill (Southern Intercollegiate Athletic Association) (1900–1901)
1900	H.T. Summersgill	5–0	3–0	T–3rd			
1901	H.T. Summersgill	4–2 (Note: The season's edition of the Battle for the Rag against LSU was originally a 22–0 victory for Tulane. The LSU Tigers protested the game to the Southern Intercollegiate Athletic Association (SIAA), and alleged that Tulane had used a professional player during the game. Several months later, the SIAA ruled the game an 11–0 forfeit in favor of LSU.)	2–1	T–3rd			
Virginius Dabney (Southern Intercollegiate Athletic Association) (1902)
1902	Virginius Dabney	1–4–2	0–3–2	15th			
Charles Eshleman (Southern Intercollegiate Athletic Association) (1903)
1903	Charles Eshleman	2–2–1	0–1–1	14th			
Thomas Barry (Southern Intercollegiate Athletic Association) (1904)
1904	Thomas Barry	5–2	3–2	7th			
John Tobin (Southern Intercollegiate Athletic Association) (1905)
1905	John Tobin	0–1	0–1	11th			
John Russ (Southern Intercollegiate Athletic Association) (1906)
1906	John Russ	0–4–1	0–3	12th			
Joe Curtis (Southern Intercollegiate Athletic Association) (1907–1908)
1907	Joe Curtis	3–2	0–1				
1908	Joe Curtis	7–1	3–0				
Buster Brown (Southern Intercollegiate Athletic Association) (1909)
1909	Buster Brown	4–3–2	2–0–2		L Bacardi		
Appleton Mason (Southern Intercollegiate Athletic Association) (1910–1912)
1910	Appleton Mason	0–7	0–5				
1911	Appleton Mason	5–3–1	3–3	T–8th			
1912	Appleton Mason	5–3	2–2	T–8th			
Appleton Mason (Southern Intercollegiate Athletic Association) (1913)
1913	Arthur Hoffman	3–5	0–4	18th			
Edwin Sweetland (Southern Intercollegiate Athletic Association) (1914)
1914	Edwin Sweetland	3–3–1	0–3–1	15th			
Clark Shaughnessy (Southern Intercollegiate Athletic Association) (1915–1920)
1915	Clark Shaughnessy	4–4	1–4	T–18th			
1916	Clark Shaughnessy	4–3–1	2–1–1	6th			
1917	Clark Shaughnessy	5–3	2–1	8th			
1918	Clark Shaughnessy	3–1–1	0–0	N/A			
1919	Clark Shaughnessy	6–2–1	3–1–1	T–5th			
1920	Clark Shaughnessy	6–2–1	5–0	T–1st			
Myron Fuller (Southern Intercollegiate Athletic Association) (1921)
1921	Myron Fuller	4–6	3–4	14th			
Clark Shaughnessy (Southern Conference) (1922–1926)
1922	Clark Shaughnessy	4–4	1–4	17th			
1923	Clark Shaughnessy	6–3–1	2–2–1	11th			
1924	Clark Shaughnessy	8–1	4–1	4th			
1925	Clark Shaughnessy	9–0–1	5–0	T–1st			
1926	Clark Shaughnessy	3–5–1	2–4	T–15th			
Bernie Bierman (Southern Conference) (1927–1931)
1927	Bernie Bierman	2–5–1	2–5–1	18th			
1928	Bernie Bierman	6–3–1	3–3–1	T–9th			
1929	Bernie Bierman	9–0	6–0	1st			
1930	Bernie Bierman	8–1	5–0	T–1st			
1931	Bernie Bierman	11–1	8–0	1st	L Rose		
Ted Cox (Southern Conference) (1932)
1932	Ted Cox	6–2–1	5–2–1	8th			
Ted Cox (Southeastern Conference) (1933–1935)
1933	Ted Cox	6–3–1	4–2–1	5th			
1934	Ted Cox	10–1	8–0	T–1st	W Sugar		
1935	Ted Cox	6–4	3–3	T–6th			
Red Dawson (Southeastern Conference) (1936–1941)
1936	Red Dawson	6–3–1	2–3–1	8th			
1937	Red Dawson	5–4–1	2–3–1	9th			
1938	Red Dawson	7–2–1	4–1–1	T–2nd			19
1939	Red Dawson	8–1–1	5–0	T–1st	L Sugar		5
1940	Red Dawson	5–5	1–3	10th			
1941	Red Dawson	5–4	2–3	8th			
Claude Simons, Jr. (Southeastern Conference) (1942–1945)
1942	Claude Simons, Jr.	4–5	1–4	10th			
1943	Claude Simons, Jr.	3–3	1–1	T–2nd			
1944	Claude Simons, Jr.	4–3	1–2	8th			
1945	Claude Simons, Jr.	2–6–1	1–3–1	10th			
Henry E. Frnka (Southeastern Conference) (1946–1951)
1946	Henry E. Frnka	3–7	2–4	9th			
1947	Henry E. Frnka	2–5–2	2–3–2	7th			
1948	Henry E. Frnka	9–1	5–1	3rd			13
1949	Henry E. Frnka	7–2–1	5–1	1st			
1950	Henry E. Frnka	6–2–1	3–1–1	4th			20
1951	Henry E. Frnka	4–6	1–5	12th			
Raymond Wolf (Southeastern Conference) (1952–1953)
1952	Raymond Wolf	5–5	3–5	8th			
1953	Raymond Wolf	1–8–1	0–7	12th			
Andy Pilney (Southeastern Conference) (1954–1961)
1954	Andy Pilney	1–6–3	1–6–1	10th			
1955	Andy Pilney	5–4–1	3–3–1	T–6th			
1956	Andy Pilney	6–4	3–3	T–6th			
1957	Andy Pilney	2–8	1–5	10th			
1958	Andy Pilney	3–7	1–5	11th			
1959	Andy Pilney	3–6–1	0–5–1	11th			
1960	Andy Pilney	3–6–1	1–4–1	10th			
1961	Andy Pilney	2–8	1–5	T–10th			
Tommy O'Boyle (Southeastern Conference) (1962–1965)
1962	Tommy O'Boyle	0–10	0–7	12th			
1963	Tommy O'Boyle	1–8–1	0–6–1	12th			
1964	Tommy O'Boyle	3–7	1–5	11th			
1965	Tommy O'Boyle	2–8	1–5	T–9th			
Jim Pittman (Independent) (1966–1970)
1966	Jim Pittman	5–4–1					
1967	Jim Pittman	3–7					
1968	Jim Pittman	2–8					
1969	Jim Pittman	3–7					
1970	Jim Pittman	8–4			W Liberty		17
Bennie Ellender (Independent) (1971–1975)
1971	Bennie Ellender	3–8					
1972	Bennie Ellender	6–5					
1973	Bennie Ellender	9–3			L Bluebonnet	15	20
1974	Bennie Ellender	5–6					
1975	Bennie Ellender	4–7					
Larry Smith (Independent) (1976–1979)
1976	Larry Smith	2–9					
1977	Larry Smith	3–8					
1978	Larry Smith	4–7					
1979	Larry Smith	9–3			L Liberty		
Vince Gibson (Independent) (1980–1982)
1980	Vince Gibson	7–5			L Hall of Fame Classic		
1981	Vince Gibson	6–5					
1982	Vince Gibson	4–7					
Wally English (Independent) (1983–1984)
1983	Wally English	2–9 (Note: The Green Wave forfeited their victories over Ole Miss and Florida State after the Supreme Court of the United States declined to hear a case on the eligibility of quarterback Jon English, which resulted in the NCAA ruling of his being ineligible due to failing to follow transfer rules being upheld.)					
1984	Wally English	3–8					
Mack Brown (Independent) (1985–1987)
1985	Mack Brown	1–10					
1986	Mack Brown	4–7					
1987	Mack Brown	6–6			L Independence		
Greg Davis (Independent) (1988–1991)
1988	Greg Davis	5–6					
1989	Greg Davis	4–8					
1990	Greg Davis	4–7					
1991	Greg Davis	1–10					
Buddy Teevens (Independent) (1992–1995)
1992	Buddy Teevens	2–9					
1993	Buddy Teevens	4–8 (Note: In 1995, the NCAA found Antonio Langham guilty of receiving improper benefits after signing with an agent following the 1992 season, forcing Alabama to forfeit all games in which Langham competed, improving Tulane's record from 3–9 to 4–8.)					
1994	Buddy Teevens	1–10					
1995	Buddy Teevens	2–9					
Buddy Teevens (Conference USA) (1996)
1996	Buddy Teevens	2–9	1–4	6th			
Tommy Bowden (Conference USA) (1997–1998)
1997	Tommy Bowden	7–4	5–1	2nd			
1998	Tommy Bowden (Note: Tulane hired Chris Scelfo to replace the departing Tommy Bowden as its 36th coach mid-season on December 7, 1998. The only game he coached that year was the Liberty Bowl, where he led the Green Wave to victory over Brigham Young. With the win, Tulane finished the season with a perfect 12–0 record.)	12–0	6–0	1st	W Liberty	7	7
Chris Scelfo (Conference USA) (1998–2006)
1999	Chris Scelfo	3–8	1–5	T–6th			
2000	Chris Scelfo	6–5	3–4	T–5th			
2001	Chris Scelfo	3–9	1–6	9th			
2002	Chris Scelfo	8–5	4–4	5th	W Hawaii		
2003	Chris Scelfo	5–7	3–5	8th			
2004	Chris Scelfo	5–6	3–5	T–6th			
2005	Chris Scelfo	2–9	1–7	T–5th (West)			
2006	Chris Scelfo	4–8	2–6	6th (West)			
Bob Toledo (Conference USA) (2007–2011)
2007	Bob Toledo	4–8	3–5	T–3rd (West)			
2008	Bob Toledo	2–10	1–7	5th (West)			
2009	Bob Toledo	3–9	1–7	6th (West)			
2010	Bob Toledo	4–8	2–6	6th (West)			
2011	Bob Toledo (Note: The team was coached by interim head coach Mark Hutson following fifth-year head coach Bob Toledo's resignation on October 18 after starting the season 2–5.)	2–11	1–7	6th (West)			
Curtis Johnson (Conference USA) (2012–2013)
2012	Curtis Johnson	2–10	2–6	6th (West)			
2013	Curtis Johnson	7–6	5–3	4th (West)	L New Orleans		
Curtis Johnson (American Athletic Conference) (2014–2015)
2014	Curtis Johnson	3–9	2–6	8th			
2015	Curtis Johnson	3–9	1–7	T–6th (West)			
Willie Fritz (American Athletic Conference) (2016–2023)
2016	Willie Fritz	4–8	1–7	6th (West)			
2017	Willie Fritz	5–7	3–5	5th (West)			
2018	Willie Fritz	7–6	5–3	T–1st (West)	W Cure		
2019	Willie Fritz	7–6	3–5	4th (West)	W Armed Forces		
2020	Willie Fritz	6–6	3–5	T–8th	L Famous Idaho Potato		
2021	Willie Fritz	2–10	1–7	T–9th			
2022	Willie Fritz	12–2	7–1	1st	W Cotton^{†}	9	9
2023	Willie Fritz (Note: Interim HC Slade Nagle coached the bowl game following the departure of Willie Fritz.)	11–3	8–0	T–1st	L Military		
Jon Sumrall (American Athletic Conference) (2024–2025)
2024	Jon Sumrall	9–5	7–1	2nd	L Gasparilla		
2025	Jon Sumrall	11–3	7–1	T–1st	L CFP First Round^{†}	18	18
Total:		581–683–38					
National championship Conference title Conference division title or championship game berth
^{†}Indicates Bowl Coalition, Bowl Alliance, BCS, or CFP / New Years' Six bowl.; ^{#}Rankings from final Coaches Poll.; ^{°}Rankings from final AP Poll.
