= 1896 Mississippi A&M Aggies football team =

American college football season

1896 Mississippi A&M Aggies football
- Conference: Southern Intercollegiate Athletic Association
- Record: 0–4 (0–2 SIAA)
- Head coach: J. B. Hildebrand (1st season)

1896 Southern Intercollegiate Athletic Association football standings
	Conf.					Overall
Team	W		L		T	W		L		T
LSU +	3	–	0	–	0	6	–	0	–	0
Georgia +	2	–	0	–	0	4	–	0	–	0
Vanderbilt	2	–	0	–	2	3	–	2	–	2
Auburn	3	–	1	–	0	3	–	1	–	0
Texas	1	–	1	–	0	4	–	2	–	1
Alabama	1	–	1	–	0	2	–	1	–	0
Kentucky State College	1	–	1	–	0	3	–	6	–	0
Sewanee	3	–	3	–	0	3	–	3	–	0
Tennessee	0	–	0	–	0	4	–	0	–	0
Tulane	1	–	2	–	0	3	–	2	–	0
Nashville	0	–	1	–	1	0	–	1	–	1
Mercer	0	–	2	–	1	0	–	2	–	1
Central (KY)	0	–	2	–	1	0	–	3	–	1
Mississippi A&M	0	–	2	–	0	0	–	4	–	0
SW Presbyterian	0	–	2	–	0	0	–	3	–	0
Cumberland (TN)			–					–
+ – Conference co-champions

The 1896 Mississippi A&M Aggies football team represented Mississippi Agricultural & Mechanical College—now known as Mississippi State University during the 1896 Southern Intercollegiate Athletic Association football season. Led by J. B. Hildebrand in his first and only season as head coach, the Aggies compiled an overall record of 0–4 with a mark of 0–2 in conference play.

== Schedule ==
Date	Opponent	Site	Result	Source
October 10	Union (TN)*	Starkville Fairgrounds; Starkville, MS	L 0–8	
November 14	at Alabama	The Quad; Tuscaloosa, AL (rivalry)	L 0–20	
November 20	at LSU	State Field; Baton Rouge, LA (rivalry)	L 0–52	
November 21	at Southern Athletic Club*	Sportsman's Park; New Orleans, LA	L 0–55	
*Non-conference game
