= 1896 Mercer Baptists football team =

American college football season

1896 Mercer Baptists football
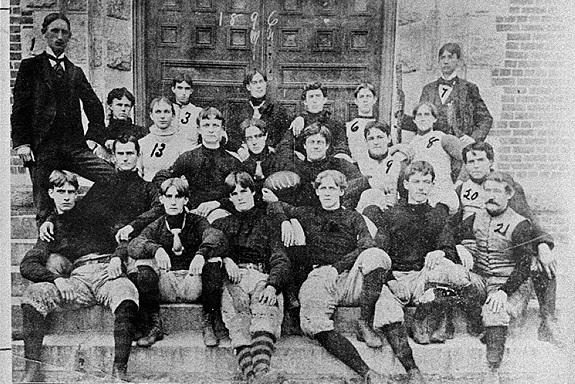
- Conference: Southern Intercollegiate Athletic Association
- Record: 0–2–1 (0–2–1 SIAA)
- Head coach: J. D. Winston (1st season)
- Home stadium: Central City Park

1896 Southern Intercollegiate Athletic Association football standings
	Conf.					Overall
Team	W		L		T	W		L		T
LSU +	3	–	0	–	0	6	–	0	–	0
Georgia +	2	–	0	–	0	4	–	0	–	0
Vanderbilt	2	–	0	–	2	3	–	2	–	2
Auburn	3	–	1	–	0	3	–	1	–	0
Texas	1	–	1	–	0	4	–	2	–	1
Alabama	1	–	1	–	0	2	–	1	–	0
Kentucky State College	1	–	1	–	0	3	–	6	–	0
Sewanee	3	–	3	–	0	3	–	3	–	0
Tennessee	0	–	0	–	0	4	–	0	–	0
Tulane	1	–	2	–	0	3	–	2	–	0
Nashville	0	–	1	–	1	0	–	1	–	1
Mercer	0	–	2	–	1	0	–	2	–	1
Central (KY)	0	–	2	–	1	0	–	3	–	1
Mississippi A&M	0	–	2	–	0	0	–	4	–	0
SW Presbyterian	0	–	2	–	0	0	–	3	–	0
Cumberland (TN)			–					–
+ – Conference co-champions

The 1896 Mercer Baptists football team represented Mercer University as a member of the Southern Intercollegiate Athletic Association (SIAA) during the 1896 college football season. They finished with a record of 0–2–1 and were outscored by their opponents 16–64.

== Schedule ==
Date	Opponent	Site	Result	Source
October 17	Auburn	Central City Park; Macon, GA	L 0–46	
October 31	Georgia Tech	Central City Park; Macon, GA	L 4–6	
November 21	at Georgia Tech	Brisbane Park; Atlanta, GA	T 12–12	
