= 1896 Southwestern Presbyterian football team =

American college football season

1896 Southwestern Presbyterian football
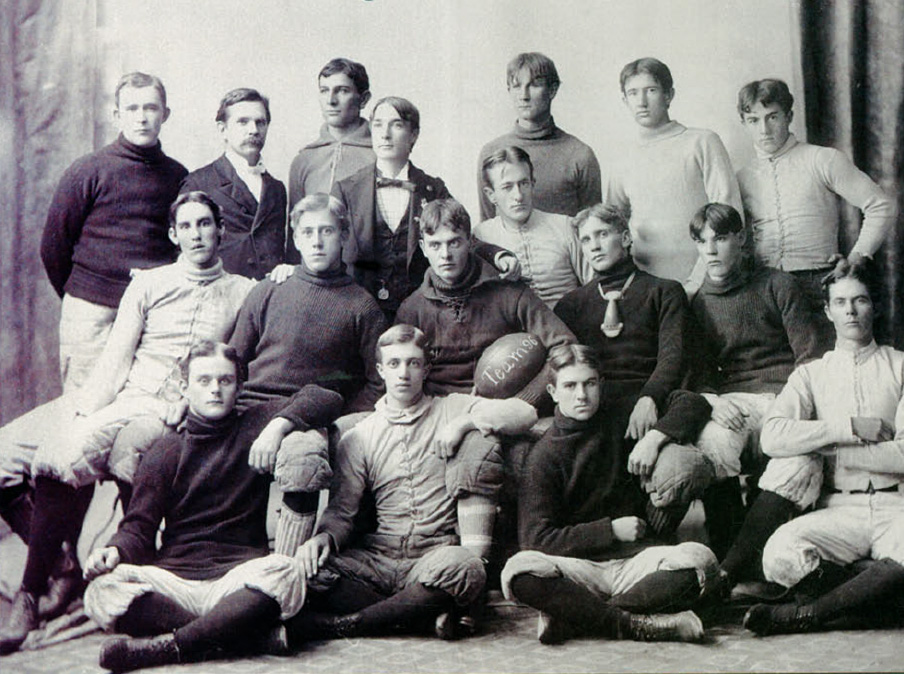
- Conference: Southern Intercollegiate Athletic Association
- Record: 0–3 (0–2 SIAA)

1896 Southern Intercollegiate Athletic Association football standings
	Conf.					Overall
Team	W		L		T	W		L		T
LSU +	3	–	0	–	0	6	–	0	–	0
Georgia +	2	–	0	–	0	4	–	0	–	0
Vanderbilt	2	–	0	–	2	3	–	2	–	2
Auburn	3	–	1	–	0	3	–	1	–	0
Texas	1	–	1	–	0	4	–	2	–	1
Alabama	1	–	1	–	0	2	–	1	–	0
Kentucky State College	1	–	1	–	0	3	–	6	–	0
Sewanee	3	–	3	–	0	3	–	3	–	0
Tennessee	0	–	0	–	0	4	–	0	–	0
Tulane	1	–	2	–	0	3	–	2	–	0
Nashville	0	–	1	–	1	0	–	1	–	1
Mercer	0	–	2	–	1	0	–	2	–	1
Central (KY)	0	–	2	–	1	0	–	3	–	1
Mississippi A&M	0	–	2	–	0	0	–	4	–	0
SW Presbyterian	0	–	2	–	0	0	–	3	–	0
Cumberland (TN)			–					–
+ – Conference co-champions

The 1896 Southwestern Presbyterian football team represented Southwestern Presbyterian in the 1896 college football season. It was the school's first team, and played its first game against Vanderbilt.

== Schedule ==
Date	Opponent	Site	Result	Source
October 10	at Nashville	Nashville, TN	L 6–28	
October 28	Nashville Athletic Club	Baseball Park; Clarksville, TN	L 0–18	
November 11	Vanderbilt	Baseball Park; Clarksville, TN	L 0–36	
