= 1896 Georgia Bulldogs football team =

American college football season

1896 Georgia Bulldogs football
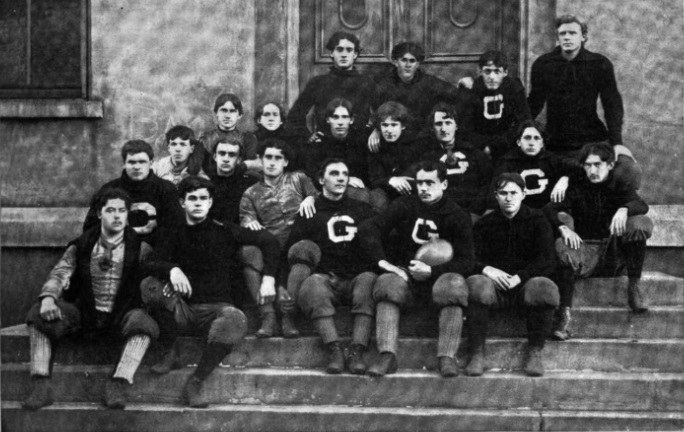

SIAA co-champion
- Conference: Southern Intercollegiate Athletic Association
- Record: 4–0 (2–0 SIAA)
- Head coach: Pop Warner (2nd season)
- Captain: Rufus B. Nalley
- Home stadium: Herty Field

1896 Southern Intercollegiate Athletic Association football standings
| | Conf. | | | | | Overall |
| Team | W | | L | | T | W | | L | | T |
|---|---|---|---|---|---|---|---|---|---|---|
| LSU + | 3 | – | 0 | – | 0 | 6 | – | 0 | – | 0 |
| Georgia + | 2 | – | 0 | – | 0 | 4 | – | 0 | – | 0 |
| Vanderbilt | 2 | – | 0 | – | 2 | 3 | – | 2 | – | 2 |
| Auburn | 3 | – | 1 | – | 0 | 3 | – | 1 | – | 0 |
| Texas | 1 | – | 1 | – | 0 | 4 | – | 2 | – | 1 |
| Alabama | 1 | – | 1 | – | 0 | 2 | – | 1 | – | 0 |
| Kentucky State College | 1 | – | 1 | – | 0 | 3 | – | 6 | – | 0 |
| Sewanee | 3 | – | 3 | – | 0 | 3 | – | 3 | – | 0 |
| Tennessee | 0 | – | 0 | – | 0 | 4 | – | 0 | – | 0 |
| Tulane | 1 | – | 2 | – | 0 | 3 | – | 2 | – | 0 |
| Nashville | 0 | – | 1 | – | 1 | 0 | – | 1 | – | 1 |
| Mercer | 0 | – | 2 | – | 1 | 0 | – | 2 | – | 1 |
| Central (KY) | 0 | – | 2 | – | 1 | 0 | – | 3 | – | 1 |
| Mississippi A&M | 0 | – | 2 | – | 0 | 0 | – | 4 | – | 0 |
| SW Presbyterian | 0 | – | 2 | – | 0 | 0 | – | 3 | – | 0 |
| Cumberland (TN) | | | – | | | | | – |
+ – Conference co-champions

The 1896 Georgia Bulldogs football team represented the University of Georgia during the 1896 Southern Intercollegiate Athletic Association football season. As a member of the Southern Intercollegiate Athletic Association (SIAA), the team provided Georgia with its first undefeated season, compiling a 4–0 record and defeating North Carolina for the first time. The Bulldogs were co-champions of the SIAA with LSU, who joined the conference in 1896.

== Before the season ==
This was the Georgia Bulldogs' second and final season under the guidance of head coach Pop Warner who had continued as coach for a second season at a salary of $40 per week for ten weeks. "It was rare in those days that a coach lasted more than one season". Several veterans returned from last season. Rufus B. Nalley and Richard Von Albade Gammon were both in the backfield, with Gammon at quarterback, and Nalley as captain.

== Schedule ==
| Date | Opponent | Site | Result | Attendance | Source |
|---|---|---|---|---|---|
| October 24 | at Wofford* | Spartanburg, SC | W 26–0 | | |
| October 31 | vs. North Carolina* | Brisbine Park; Atlanta, GA | W 24–16 | 3,000 | |
| November 9 | Sewanee | Herty Field; Athens, GA | W 26–0 | | |
| November 26 | vs. Auburn | Brisbine Park; Atlanta, GA (rivalry) | W 12–6 | | |
*Non-conference game

== Season summary ==
=== Wofford ===
The season opened in Spartanburg with a 26–0 defeat of Wofford.

=== North Carolina ===
| Team | 1 | 2 | Total |
|---|---|---|---|
| UNC | 10 | 6 | 16 |
| • Georgia | 18 | 6 | 24 |

- Location: Brisbane Park
  Atlanta, GA
- Game attendance: 3,000

In "the first big football game of the season", Georgia beat North Carolina 24–16 in a close game. "For the first time in Southern football history the football supremacy of Virginia and North Carolina was successfully challenged."

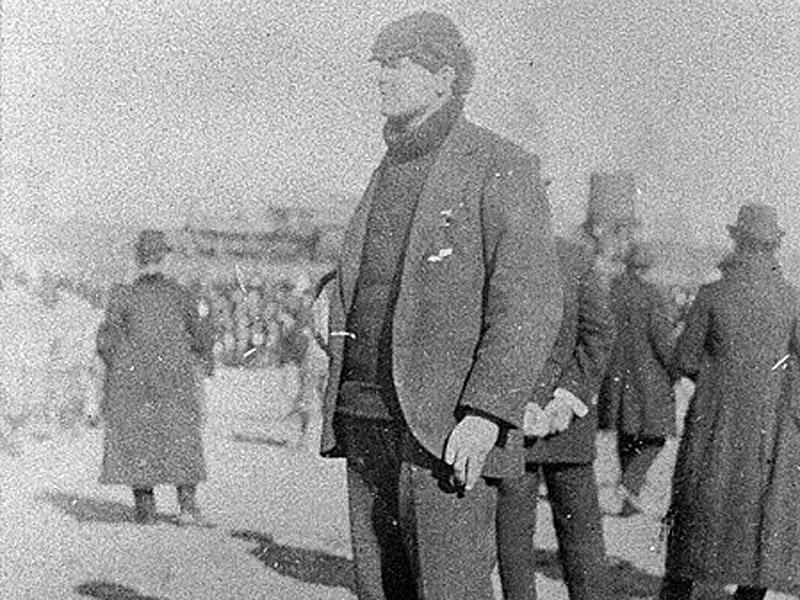
Coach Warner on the Georgia sidelines.

The first touchdown came when George Whitfield Price went around right tackle for 8 yards. "There were yells of 'Price', 'Price' everywhere". Carolina's Heyward then got his own touchdown through right tackle.

Later, Carolina's Belden made a great punt, which went over Lovejoy's head. Wright fell on it for a touchdown, giving Carolina the lead. Then guard Wright Blanche broke through and tied the score with a 30-yard run between right end and tackle. He then later went around right end to put the Bulldogs up by a score as the first half ended. A blocked kick from Blanch and Key led to Georgia's final touchdown. After Green ran for 40 yards on a fake buck, Heyward scored the last touchdown for Carolina from 5 yards out.

The starting lineup was Wight (left end), Price (left tackle), Blanch (left guard), Atkinson (center, Middlebrooke (right guard), Kent (right tackle), Watson (right end), Gammon (quarterback), Nalley (left halfback), Cothrell (right halfback), Lovejoy (fullback).

=== Sewanee ===
The Bulldogs defeated the Sewanee Tigers 26–0. Sewanee's offense was weak.

=== Auburn ===
| Team | 1 | 2 | Total |
|---|---|---|---|
| Auburn | 0 | 6 | 6 |
| • Georgia | 6 | 6 | 12 |

- Location: Piedmont Park
  Atlanta, GA

In the rivalry game with John Heisman's Auburn to decide the conference, Georgia won 12–6 to close its first undefeated season. Georgia's quarterback the following season Reynolds Tichenor was at the same spot for the Tigers.

Lovejoy scored Georgia's first touchdown, without Nalley using signals. The next touchdown came on another trick, with an onside kick to get the ball. Walter Cothran followed this with an 80-yard touchdown run. Tichenor then had a long punt return for Auburn. Tichenor once said he had been sprawled on the ground, when a big Georgia lineman jumped at him, knees first, with Tichenor rolling out of the way just in time. "The fellow was very polite," Tichenor said. "We both got up and he apologized very profusely for having missed me." Tichenor later transferred to Georgia to attend law school.

The starting lineup was Wight (left end), Price (left tackle), Walker (left guard), Atkinson (center, Blanch (right guard), Walden (right tackle), Dougherty (right end), Gammon (quarterback), Nalley (left halfback), Pomeroy (right halfback), Lovejoy (fullback).

== Postseason ==
The 1896 team is considered one of Georgia's early great ones. Georgia did not win another conference championship until the 1920 season.
