= 1896 Texas Longhorns football team =

American college football season

1896 Texas Longhorns football
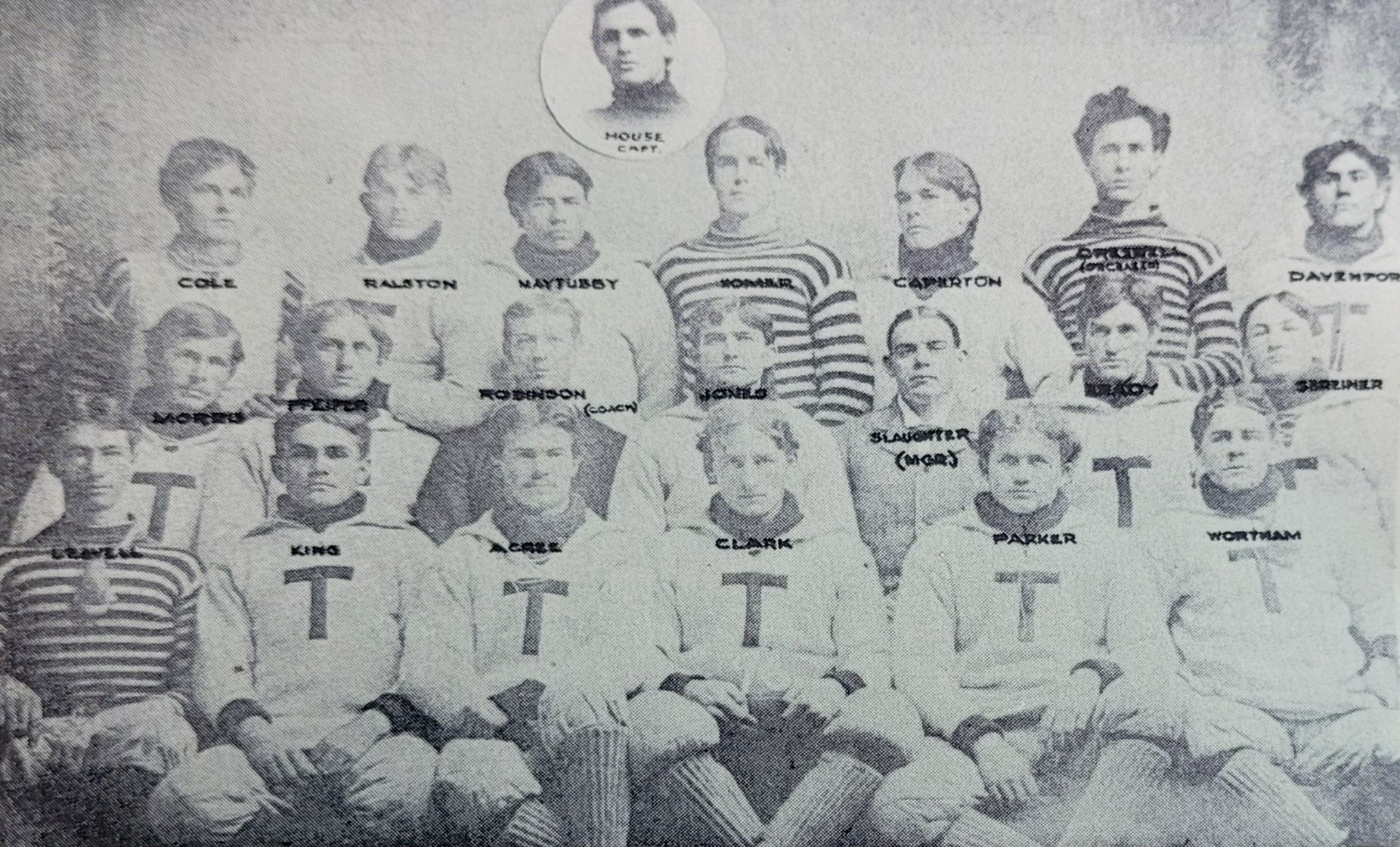
- Conference: Southern Intercollegiate Athletic Association
- Record: 4–2–1 (1–1 SIAA)
- Head coach: Harry Orman Robinson (1st season)
- Captains: Julius House; James S. Jones
- Home stadium: Varsity Athletic Field

1896 Southern Intercollegiate Athletic Association football standings
	Conf.					Overall
Team	W		L		T	W		L		T
LSU +	3	–	0	–	0	6	–	0	–	0
Georgia +	2	–	0	–	0	4	–	0	–	0
Vanderbilt	2	–	0	–	2	3	–	2	–	2
Auburn	3	–	1	–	0	3	–	1	–	0
Texas	1	–	1	–	0	4	–	2	–	1
Alabama	1	–	1	–	0	2	–	1	–	0
Kentucky State College	1	–	1	–	0	3	–	6	–	0
Sewanee	3	–	3	–	0	3	–	3	–	0
Tennessee	0	–	0	–	0	4	–	0	–	0
Tulane	1	–	2	–	0	3	–	2	–	0
Nashville	0	–	1	–	1	0	–	1	–	1
Mercer	0	–	2	–	1	0	–	2	–	1
Central (KY)	0	–	2	–	1	0	–	3	–	1
Mississippi A&M	0	–	2	–	0	0	–	4	–	0
SW Presbyterian	0	–	2	–	0	0	–	3	–	0
Cumberland (TN)			–					–
+ – Conference co-champions

The 1896 Texas Longhorns football team represented the University of Texas in the 1896 Southern Intercollegiate Athletic Association football season. Led by Harry Orman Robinson in his first and only season as head coach, the team compiled an overall record of 4–2–1 with a mark of 1–1 in Southern Intercollegiate Athletic Association (SIAA) play. The team participated in the first gridiron football games played in Mexico through a series of exhibition games against the Missouri Tigers.

== Personnel ==
=== Lineup ===
Player	Position	Year
James Jones [Co-C]	Right End	2nd
Otto Pfeiffer	Right Tackle	1st
Andrew Denmark	Right Guard	2nd
James Clarke	Center	1st
R.W. Wortham	Left Guard	2nd
R.D. Parker Jr.	Left Tackle	3rd
Wallace Ralston	Left End	3rd
S.F. Acree	Quarterback	2nd
Joseph Maytubby	Right Halfback	1st
James Caperton	Left Halfback	2nd
Arthur Homer	Fullback	1st

==== Subs ====
Player	Position	Year
C.H. Leavell	Halfback	1st
Clarence King	Tackle	1st
Lamar Bethea	Halfback	1st
Walter Schreiner	End	1st
Frank Creswell		1st
Jerry Debenport	Guard	1st

== Schedule ==
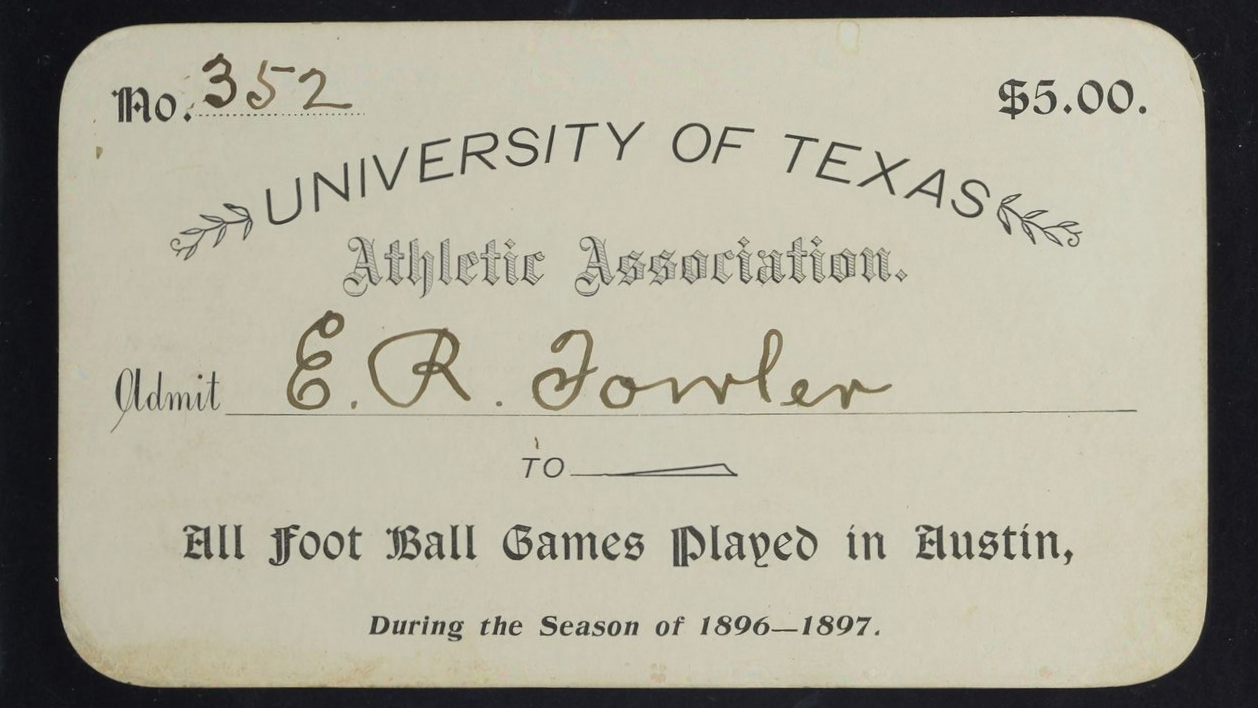
University of Texas Athletic Association season ticket for the 1896 season.

Date	Time	Opponent	Site	Result	Attendance	Source
October 17	3:40 p.m.	Galveston High*	Varsity Athletic Field; Austin, TX	W 42–0	800	
October 24		at Dallas University*	Dallas, TX	T 0–0		
November 7	3:35 p.m.	San Antonio Town Team*	Varsity Athletic Field; Austin, TX	W 12–4		
November 14	3:30 p.m.	at Tulane	Tulane campus; New Orleans, LA	W 12–4	800	
November 16		at LSU	State Field; Baton Rouge, LA	L 0–14		
November 26		Dallas University*	Varsity Athletic Field; Austin, TX	W 22–4	2,000	
December 14	3:45 p.m.	Missouri*	Varsity Athletic Field; Austin, TX	L 0–10		
December 25		vs. Missouri*	Monterrey, Mexico	L 0–12 (exhibition)	3,000	
December 29		vs. Missouri*	Indianilla grounds; Mexico City, Mexico	T 0–0 (exhibition)		
January 2	10:00 a.m.	vs. Missouri*	Bicycle Park; Laredo, TX	L 6–18 (exhibition)	300	
*Non-conference game
