= Wright Blanche =

Profile
- Position: Guard

Personal information
- Born: c. 1873; Quitman, Georgia
- Died: ?
- Listed height: 6 ft 2 in (1.88 m)
- Listed weight: 192 lb (87 kg)

Career information
- College: Georgia

Wright B. Blanche (c. 1873 – ?), was an American college football player. He was a guard on the Southern Intercollegiate Athletic Association (SIAA) champion 1896 Georgia Bulldogs football team, coached by Pop Warner. John Heisman selected the 30 best Southern football players in 1915, and mentioned Blanche fifth. He scored two touchdowns in the victory over North Carolina.
