= George H. Brooke =

American football player and coach (1874-1938)

Biographical details
- Born: July 9, 1874; Brookeville, Maryland, U.S.
- Died: November 16, 1938 (aged 64); Tucson, Arizona, U.S.

Playing career
- 1889–1892: Swarthmore
- 1893–1895: Penn
- 1896: Tulane
- Position: Fullback

Coaching career (HC unless noted)
- 1897: Stanford
- 1900–1912: Swarthmore
- 1913–1915: Penn

Head coaching record
- Overall: 90–46–10

Accomplishments and honors

Awards
- 2× Consensus All-American (1894, 1895)
- College Football Hall of Fame; Inducted in 1969 (profile)

George Haydock Brooke (July 9, 1874 – November 16, 1938) was an American college football player and coach. He played football as a fullback at Swarthmore College from 1889 to 1892 and at the University of Pennsylvania from 1893 to 1895. Brooke served as the head football coach at Stanford University (1897), Swarthmore (1900–1912), and Penn (1913–1915), compiling a career coaching record of 90–46–10. He was inducted into the College Football Hall of Fame as a player in 1969.

== Early life and family history ==
Brooke was born on July 9, 1874, in Brookeville, Maryland, to Walter H. Brooke and Caroline Leggett Brooke. He was married to Marie Louise Gregg Robb. He and his wife had no children. Brooke attended Brookeville High School in Maryland before moving on to Swarthmore College. At Swarthmore, he played baseball and football. He was the captain of the 1892 Swarthmore football team. He received a Bachelor of Science degree from Swarthmore in 1893. He next enrolled at the University of Pennsylvania, where he earned a Bachelor of Philosophy (Ph. B) degree in 1895 and a Bachelor of Law (LL. B) degree in 1898.

== Playing career ==
Brooke played seven years of college football at Swarthmore College and then at the University of Pennsylvania. He was selected as an All-American in 1894 and 1895 while playing for the University of Pennsylvania. Penn was undefeated and won the national championship of football in the two seasons that Brooke was named an All-American. All-American selector, Caspar Whitney called Brooke a "very hard man to stop. He strikes the line with almost irresistible force." He was regarded as a ferocious fullback and a top notch punter. He is credited with coining the phrase "coffin corner" when describing his long punts deep into the opposing end of the field. Brooke was barred from playing for Pennsylvania after the 1895 season because of an agreement between Harvard and the University of Pennsylvania that limited players to four seasons. After finishing a bachelor's degree from Pennsylvania, Brooke was the subject of an allegation of being an ineligible player in an October 24, 1896, game in New Orleans, LA. In the game, Brooke played only one down for Tulane University before LSU protested to the game's referee. Tulane claimed that Brooke planned on enrolling there as a graduate student. During the debate between team captains, Brooke refused to sign an affidavit stating his intention to enroll at Tulane, as he was already enrolled in law school at the University of Pennsylvania. The referee ruled him ineligible to play. The Tulane football team refused to continue playing the game without Brooke, so the referee ruled the game to be a forfeit in favor of LSU.

== Coaching career ==
Following his playing career, Brooke was the head football coach at Stanford University in 1897, compiling a record of 4–1. In the spring of 1898 he took a break from coaching and joined the first Pennsylvania unit that was mustered into service for the Spanish–American War. He served in Puerto Rico during the conflict. Brooke was discharged from the Army later in 1898 with the war ending. From 1900 to 1912 he coached Swarthmore College's football team, earning an overall record of 72–32–6. He coached three years at the University of Pennsylvania, where his record was 13–12–4. After leaving coaching, he became an insurance broker. He suffered from a heart condition, and spent his final years living on the West Coast. He died November 16, 1938, in Tucson, Arizona.

== Other interests and legacy ==
Brooke was also an accomplished squash player, winning the national amateur squash championship in 1904, and the doubles championship in 1917.

Brooke died in 1938. In 1969, he was posthumously inducted into the College Football Hall of Fame.

== Head coaching record ==
Year	Team	Overall	Conference	Standing	Bowl/playoffs
Stanford (Independent) (1897)
1897	Stanford	4–1			
Stanford:		4–1			
Swarthmore Quakers (Independent) (1899–1912)
1899	Swarthmore	9–1–2			
1900	Swarthmore	6–3–2			
1901	Swarthmore	8–2–2			
1902	Swarthmore	6–6			
1903	Swarthmore	6–4			
1904	Swarthmore	6–3			
1905	Swarthmore	8–1			
1906	Swarthmore	7–2			
1907	Swarthmore	6–2			
1908	No team				
1909	Swarthmore	2–5			
1910	Swarthmore	5–3			
1911	Swarthmore	6–1–1			
1912	Swarthmore	7–1–1			
Swarthmore:		73–33–6			
Penn Quakers (Independent) (1913–1915)
1913	Penn	6–3–1			
1914	Penn	4–4–1			
1915	Penn	3–5–2			
Penn:		13–12–4			
Total:		90–46–10			
