= 1896 Tennessee Volunteers football team =

American college football season

1896 Tennessee Volunteers football
- Conference: Southern Intercollegiate Athletic Association
- Record: 4–0 (1–0 SIAA)
- Head coach: None
- Captain: Strang Nicklin
- Home stadium: Baldwin Park

1896 Southern Intercollegiate Athletic Association football standings
	Conf.					Overall
Team	W		L		T	W		L		T
LSU +	3	–	0	–	0	6	–	0	–	0
Georgia +	2	–	0	–	0	4	–	0	–	0
Vanderbilt	2	–	0	–	2	3	–	2	–	2
Tennessee	1	–	0	–	0	4	–	0	–	0
Auburn	3	–	1	–	0	3	–	1	–	0
Texas	1	–	1	–	0	4	–	2	–	1
Alabama	1	–	1	–	0	2	–	1	–	0
Kentucky State College	1	–	1	–	0	3	–	6	–	0
Sewanee	3	–	3	–	0	3	–	3	–	0
Tulane	1	–	2	–	0	3	–	2	–	0
Nashville	0	–	1	–	1	0	–	1	–	1
Mercer	0	–	2	–	1	0	–	2	–	1
Central (KY)	0	–	2	–	1	0	–	3	–	1
Mississippi A&M	0	–	2	–	0	0	–	4	–	0
SW Presbyterian	0	–	2	–	0	0	–	3	–	0
Cumberland (TN)			–					–
+ – Conference co-champions

The 1896 Tennessee Volunteers football team represented the University of Tennessee in the 1896 college football season. It was the first official Tennessee Volunteers football team since 1893. The 1896 Vols went undefeated at 4–0 for the first winning season in school history. This was also the Tennessee's first season in the Southern Intercollegiate Athletic Association (SIAA), though they did not play a conference opponent.

== Schedule ==
Date	Opponent	Site	Result	Source
October 22	Williamsburg (KY)*	Baldwin Park; Knoxville, TN	W 10–6	
October 24	at Chattanooga Athletic Club*	Chattanooga, TN	W 4–0	
November 14	VPI*	Baldwin Park; Knoxville, TN	W 6–4	
November 26	Central (KY)*	Baldwin Park; Knoxville, TN	W 30–0	
*Non-conference game
