= Onside kick =

Short kickoff in gridiron football to try to keep possession of the ball

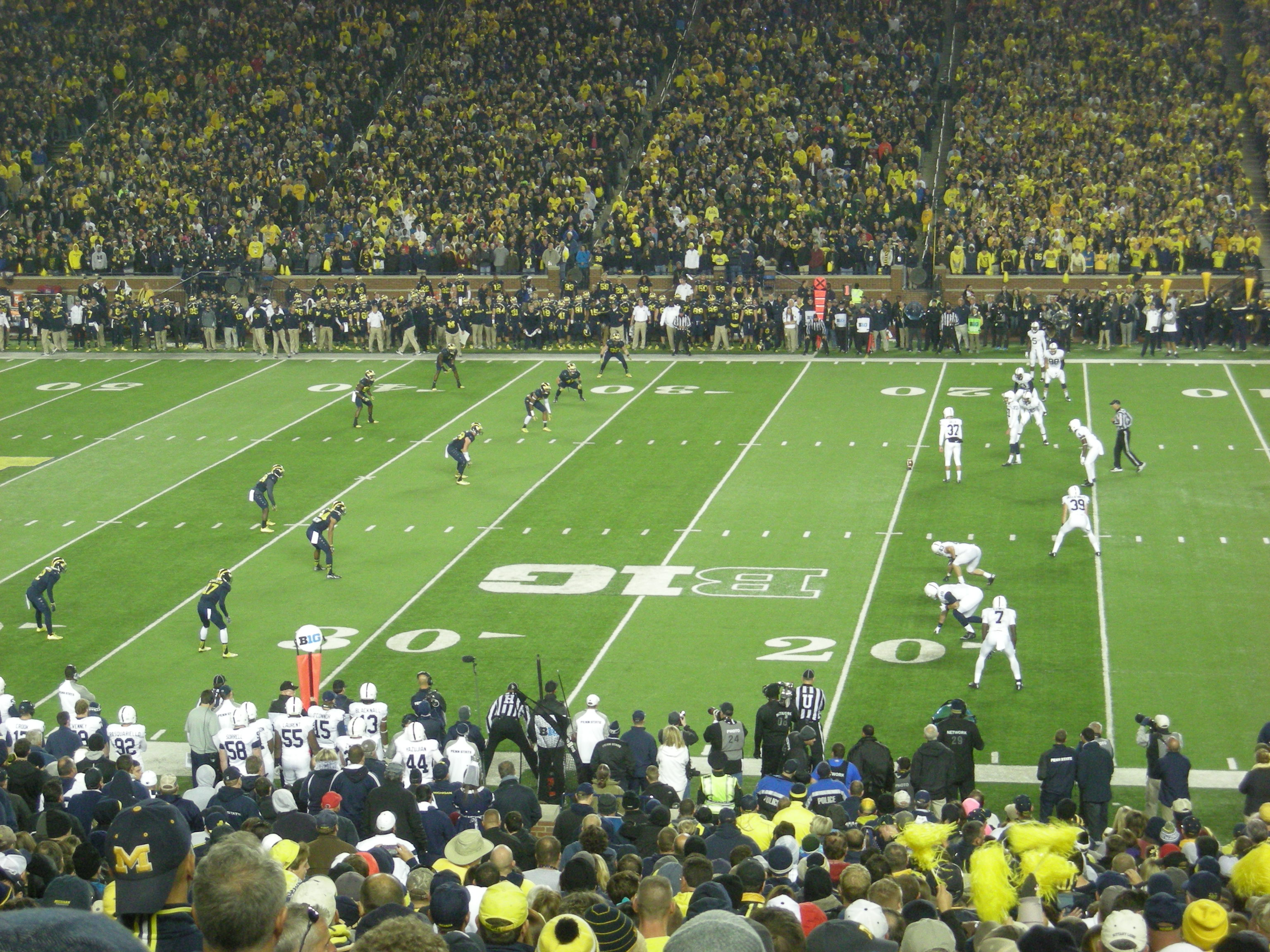
Penn State lined up for an onside kick.

In gridiron football, an onside kick is a kickoff (under American and Canadian rules) or punt (under Canadian rules only) deliberately kicked short in an attempt by the kicking team to regain possession of the ball. This is in contrast with a typical kickoff or punt, in which the kicking team kicks the ball far downfield in order to maximize the distance the receiving team has to advance the ball in order to score. The risk to the team attempting an onside kick is that if it is unsuccessful the receiving team gets the ball and usually has a much better field position than with a normal kick.

The onside kick has a low success rate, though its chances of success increase in a situation where the returning team does not expect it. In American football, it is generally only seen late in a game when a team has just scored but is still trailing by 8 points or fewer (the most points that can be scored on a single possession) and needs to regain possession in order to score again before time expires.

== General rules ==
Gridiron football originates in rugby football and so does the onside kick. In rugby, while the forward pass is prohibited, a team in possession may legally kick the ball downfield and recapture possession, provided that the receiver of the kick was onside when the kick was made (i.e., abreast with or behind the kicker.)

This form of onside kick is still legal in Canadian football, just as in rugby. A player of the kicking team (for any kick, not just a free kick) who is "onside" may recover the ball and retain possession for his team. This includes the kicker himself and anyone else behind the ball at the time it was kicked, other than the holder for a place kick.

The form of onside kick available at a free kick in American football is also available in Canadian football for a kickoff as well, although it is referred to as a short-kick, as all players are onside for a kickoff; however, the kick may well be chipped high instead of bounced, because the players of the receiving team have no particular first right to the ball as in American football (due to the fair catch rule); both sides may play the ball equally, even in the air.

In 2026 NFL rules, onside kicks are allowed at any time & by any team. In prior rule changes, it was made a rule that the team must be trailing in the fourth quarter, but this has since been amended.

== Modern American football usage ==
Starting in 1923, the following additional constraints in most forms of American football are relevant to the onside kick:

- The kick must be a free kick (a kickoff, or free kick after a safety; in high school football, but not the NFL, the rare fair catch kick can also be recovered onside).
- The kick must cross the receiving team's restraining line (normally 10 yards in front of the kicking team's line), unless the receiving team touches the ball before that line.
- The kicking team may only recover and retain possession of the kicked ball, but not advance it.
- The kicking team must not interfere with an attempt by a player of the receiving side to catch the ball on the fly.

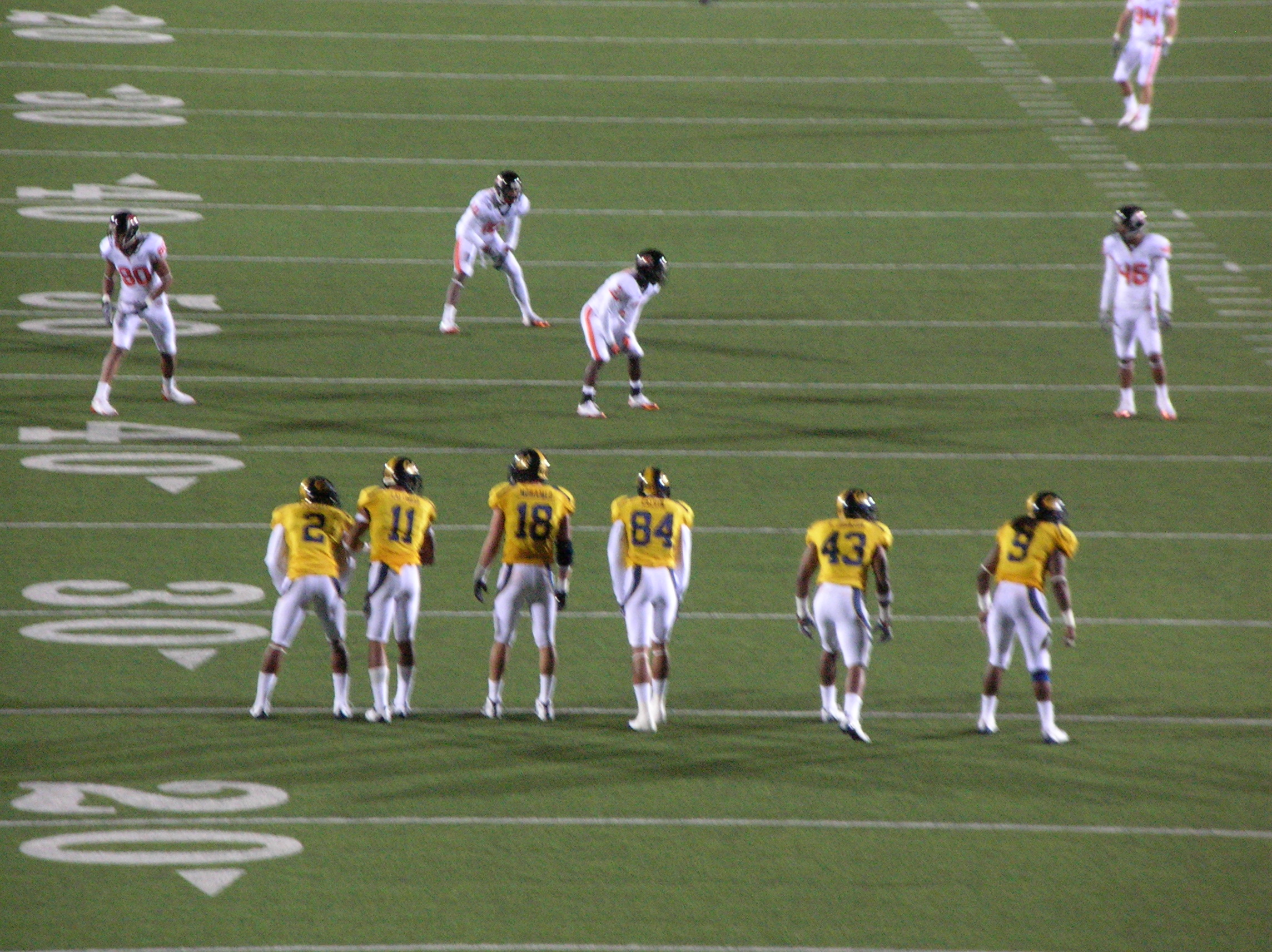
California lines up to attempt an onside kick against Oregon State in a November 2009 American football game. Oregon State recovered the ball.

Unlike during a punt—when if the kicking team catches or recovers the ball, it is "downed" and the receiving team possesses the ball—during a free kick, a ball that has crossed the receiving team's restraining line is normally a live ball, such that if the kicking team catches or recovers the ball it retains possession. "Onside" is therefore now a misnomer in American football; an onside kick is simply any free kick that is kicked in a particular way to give the kicking team the best chance of regaining possession—typically in a diagonal direction and as close to the advancing players from the kicking team as possible.

The kicking team generally attempts to make the ball bounce early (to remove the possibility of being charged with interfering with a catch) and be available around 20 yards in front of the spot of the kick. One technique, useful especially on a hard or artificial surface, is to kick the ball in such a way that it spins end-over-end near the ground and makes a sudden bounce high in the air. The oblong shape of an American football makes it bounce unpredictably, increasing the possibility that the receiving team will muff the catch. An alternative is to kick the ball with great force directly at an opposing player. If the ball touches the player, but he cannot secure it, it becomes live regardless of whether it has traveled 10 yards.

When the receiving team expects an onside kick, it often fields a "hands team" of players skilled at catching or otherwise securing the ball. This is so they can make sure of securing possession once the ball has traveled the necessary 10 yards—the receiving team cannot simply refuse to touch the ball, as the ball is live once it has traveled 10 yards and can be claimed by either team; thus, if the receiving team does not make a play on the ball, it makes it far easier for the kicking team to do so and regain possession.

Traditionally, the onside kick had its own formation, in which the other ten players of the kicking team would line up on one side (left or right) of the kicker, in an effort to get as many people as possible into one area of the field. This is still popular in high school football; however, the NCAA (and later the NFL) now require that at least four players line up on each side of the kicker. To combat this, some teams (including the Buffalo Bills, who pioneered this strategy) developed a "cluster formation" in which all of the players line up behind and immediately next to the kicker in what is effectively a moving huddle. The NFL eventually banned this, too, with a 2009 rule change that states that "the kicking team cannot have more than five players bunched together"; the rule change has been considered a gratuitous targeting of Bills special teams coach Bobby April, as the ostensible reason for the ban (injury risk) had negligible evidence to support it. Effective with the 2018 season, the NFL requires that the kicking team line up with five players on each side of the ball. Additionally, the kicking team's players must line up in a specified configuration—on each side of the ball, at least two players must be between the sideline and the numbered yard markings, and at least two must line up between the numbers and hashmarks. At the same time, the NFL also required that at least eight members of the receiving team line up within the 15-yard "setup zone" (between 10 and 25 yards from the kickoff spot).

In 2018, the NFL also mandated that no member of the kicking team, apart from the kicker, could line up more than one yard from the spot of the kickoff. Previously, all members of the kicking team could line up as many as five yards from the kickoff spot, allowing that team to make a running start toward an onside kick.

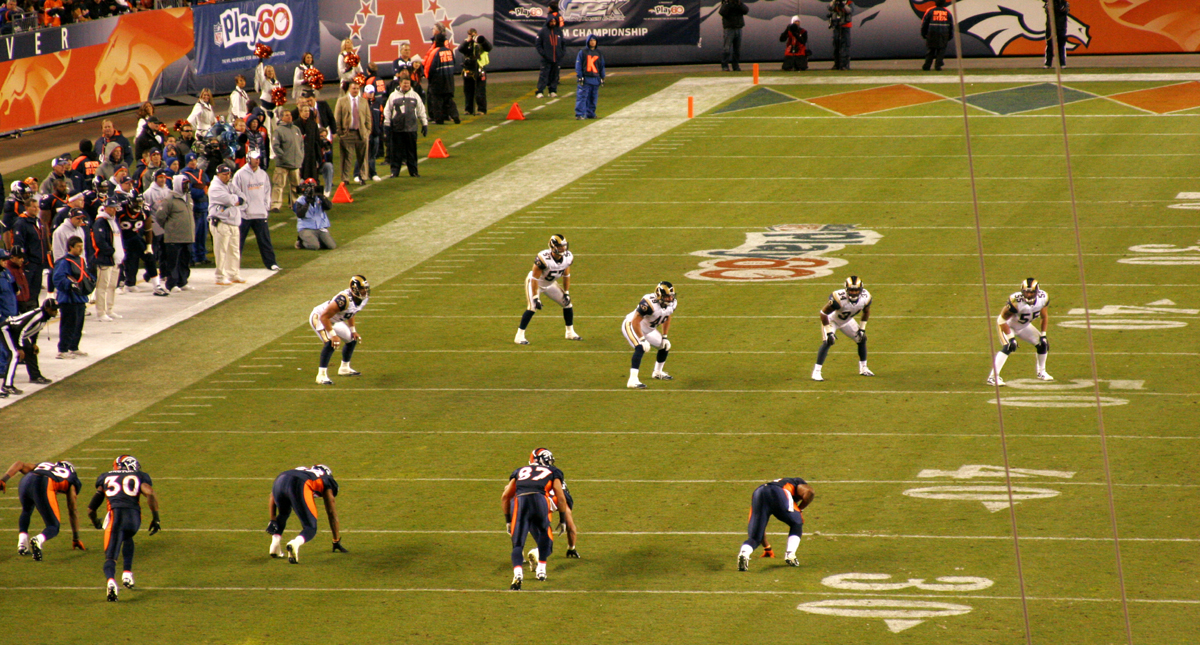
The Denver Broncos (blue) attempting an onside kick in the fourth quarter against the St. Louis Rams on November 28, 2010, while trailing by three points. Denver did not recover. The Broncos' formation is now illegal in the NFL.

An onside kick is usually a desperation technique used when the kicking team trails in the game with little time left, in order to regain the ball and score again. The trade-off is that, in the usual case where the receiving team does get possession of the ball, it will have better field position and will need to advance the ball fewer yards in order to score. However, in the desperation situation, initial field position becomes less relevant, as the receiving team may focus on running the clock out and ending the game. If the kicking team succeeds in retaining possession, then the clock does not automatically stop as it would if the ball were transferred between teams (though it may stop for other reasons).

Occasionally, football coaches attempt surprise onside kicks to catch their opponent's players off guard and without the "hands team" on the field. Notable examples from championship games include Super Bowl XXX, when Pittsburgh Steelers coach Bill Cowher called an onside kick early in the fourth quarter when trailing 20–10, which was successfully recovered, and Super Bowl XLIV, where the New Orleans Saints executed an onside kickoff to start the second half and successfully converted the possession into a touchdown. In the 2016 College Football Playoff National Championship, with the score tied at 24–24 in the middle of the fourth quarter, the Alabama Crimson Tide successfully executed an onside kick against the Clemson Tigers, which led to a touchdown that gave Alabama the lead and eventual victory.

An onside kick is considered successful if the kicking team regains the ball. Between 2001 and 2010, surprise onside kicks were successful 60% of the time, while expected onside kicks were successful less than 20% of the time. Another study of just the 2005 and 2006 seasons also found similar disparities depending on whether the defense expects an onside kick. Accordingly, some analysts have suggested that the surprise onside kick is underutilized. In 2014, the Indianapolis Colts routinely used the onside kick, with three in the first six games of the season, often at the start of the game. Each of these was successful.

Overall, the success rate of the onside kick has dropped considerably since these rule changes. In the 2018 season, only 4 of 52 onside kicks (8%) were successful, a figure that had dropped to 6% (two of 32) through the first eleven weeks of 2019.

Furthermore, for the 2024 season, the NFL adopted a new kickoff procedure that banned surprise onside kicks. Teams are now required to announce any onside kick attempts to officials before the play, and these may only be attempted by the losing team in the 4th quarter, which was changed to any quarter for the 2025 season.

== Offside "onside" kicks ==
There have been versions of American football in which the kicking team could recover the ball once it hit the ground, regardless of onside or offside, and not only for free kicks. Any such kick recovered by the kicking team is often referred to as an "onside kick," even if the recovering player was in front of the kicker at the time of the kick (and thus, according to the original definition, offside).

One such scenario remains legal at all levels: any player on the offensive team can recover a kick anywhere on or behind the line of scrimmage.

=== College football ===
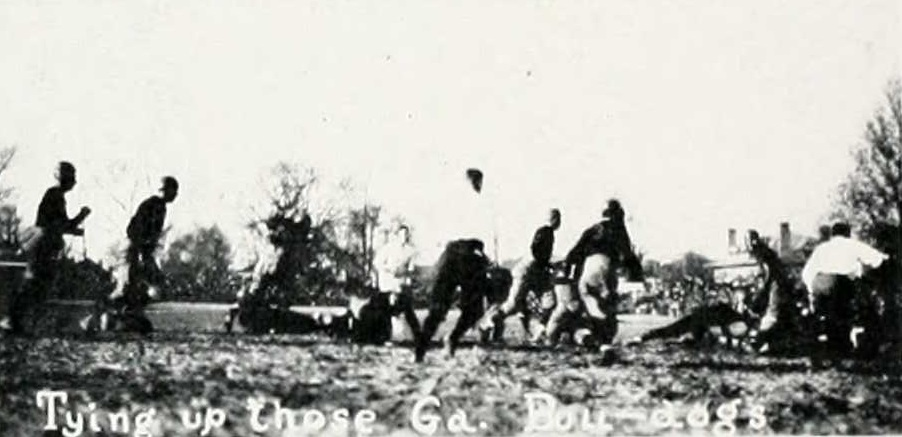
Onside kick to tie Vanderbilt v. Georgia game in 1921

The first successful onside kick in the South was executed by the Georgia Bulldogs, in the 1896 Georgia v. Auburn game, between coaches Pop Warner and John Heisman. Prior to the modern rules in 1923, there were what was referred to as "onside kicks from scrimmage." Vanderbilt coach Dan McGugin was a prime innovator in this field, and in fact in 1921 tied Georgia for the Southern crown on such a play.

Saint Louis University coach Eddie Cochems described the play after the 1906 season:

"Instead of keeping the ball in the air it should be kicked to the ground as soon as the case will permit, since the moment it touches, the whole team is on-side. The longer the kicker can delay kicking the further down the field the team can get to either recover the ball themselves or form interference for the player who is supposed to recover."

In these early years and into the 1920s, all players of the kicking team except the kicker were permitted to recover the ball once it hit the ground beyond the neutral zone. Later, the rules were modified to require it be at least 20 yards downfield, before recovering one's own kick was eventually eliminated outright.

=== Professional football ===
One such version, Arena football, is current; however, it must be taken from either a place kick or drop kick, because punts are illegal in that league. Arena football also has the advantage in that it features rebound nets surrounding the goal posts; thus, unlike in the outdoor game, a potential onside kick receiver does not have to outrun the speed of the kicked ball, and the kicker can carom the ball off the net in hopes of it landing in his teammate's arms.

The XFL, in its 2001 season, allowed a punting team to recover its own kick if the punt went at least 25 yards past the line of scrimmage. The 2020 revival of the XFL did not revive this rule.

The idea of the early 20th century, XFL, and Arena rules allowing kicking side recovery on grounded balls was generally to force the receiving team to play the ball, encourage surprise quick kicking, and thereby loosen the defense. However, kicks have rarely been employed as offensive tactics even when these rules were present; the forward pass remains the more effective (and substantially less risky) tactic to loosen and surprise the defense.

== Alternatives to onside kicks ==
The Alliance of American Football, which played a partial season in 2019, eliminated all kickoffs, including onside kicks. The AAF's substitute for onside kicks was an "onside conversion", essentially an attempt to convert a 4th-and-12. This was allowed in only two situations:

- Five minutes or less remained in the fourth quarter, or
- The team attempting the conversion was trailing by at least 17 points.

After scoring a touchdown, a team could opt to try an onside conversion from its own 28-yard line. After giving up a safety, a team could opt to try an onside conversion from its own 18-yard line. In both cases, the team had to gain at least 12 yards on that play to maintain possession. Otherwise, the opponent gained possession at the final spot of the play.

The Denver Broncos proposed adding a slightly modified version of the AAF's onside conversion rule to the NFL rules for the 2019 NFL season. The Broncos' proposal would make the attempt a 4th-and-15 from the attempting team's 35-yard line. Additionally, this proposal would have allowed each team to run this play only once per game, and only in the fourth quarter. When first proposed, the NFL's competition committee voted 7–1 in favor of the change, but it failed to receive the required two-thirds majority approval from the league owners at their March 2019 meeting. The proposed rule change was revisited at the next NFL owners' meeting in 2020 but was not approved.

For the 2020 Pro Bowl, the NFL announced a special onside conversion rule, essentially using the Broncos' proposal above, except the 4th-and-15 is attempted from the team's own 25-yard line.

Fan Controlled Football, which has no kicking, offers the onside conversion; teams must gain 10 yards from their own 10-yard line.

The 2022 version of the USFL has kickoffs, but also offers the onside conversion, with teams required to gain 12 yards from their own 33-yard line.

== Rugby ==
Most kick-offs in rugby union are similar to the onside kick: the kick-off is directed a minimum of ten metres forward and both teams attempt to recover the ball. In both codes of rugby during live play, the bomb or "up and under" involves kicking the ball forward with a very high trajectory then the kicker and other on-side players rushing forward in an attempt to recover the ball.

== See also ==
- American football
- American football strategy
- Canadian football
