= 1896 Sewanee Tigers football team =

American college football season

1896 Sewanee Tigers football
- Conference: Southern Intercollegiate Athletic Association
- Record: 3–3 (3–3 SIAA)
- Head coach: Eddie Blair (1st season)
- Captain: J. S. Tanner
- Home stadium: Hardee Field

1896 Southern Intercollegiate Athletic Association football standings
	Conf.					Overall
Team	W		L		T	W		L		T
LSU +	3	–	0	–	0	6	–	0	–	0
Georgia +	2	–	0	–	0	4	–	0	–	0
Vanderbilt	2	–	0	–	2	3	–	2	–	2
Auburn	3	–	1	–	0	3	–	1	–	0
Texas	1	–	1	–	0	4	–	2	–	1
Alabama	1	–	1	–	0	2	–	1	–	0
Kentucky State College	1	–	1	–	0	3	–	6	–	0
Sewanee	3	–	3	–	0	3	–	3	–	0
Tennessee	0	–	0	–	0	4	–	0	–	0
Tulane	1	–	2	–	0	3	–	2	–	0
Nashville	0	–	1	–	1	0	–	1	–	1
Mercer	0	–	2	–	1	0	–	2	–	1
Central (KY)	0	–	2	–	1	0	–	3	–	1
Mississippi A&M	0	–	2	–	0	0	–	4	–	0
SW Presbyterian	0	–	2	–	0	0	–	3	–	0
Cumberland (TN)			–					–
+ – Conference co-champions

The 1896 Sewanee Tigers football team represented the Sewanee Tigers of Sewanee: The University of the South during the 1896 Southern Intercollegiate Athletic Association football season.

== Schedule ==
Date	Opponent	Site	Result	Attendance	Source
October 17	Nashville	Hardee Field; Sewanee, TN	W 6–0		
October 26	Central (KY)	Hardee Field; Sewanee, TN	W 6–4		
October 31	at Alabama	The Quad; Tuscaloosa, AL	W 10–6		
November 9	at Georgia	Herty Field; Athens, GA	L 0–26		
November 16	at Auburn	Riverside Park; Montgomery, AL	L 6–38		
November 26	Vanderbilt	Hardee Field; Sewanee, TN (rivalry)	L 4–10	2,500	
