= 1896 Kentucky State College Blue and White football team =

American college football season

1896 Kentucky State College Blue and White football
- Conference: Southern Intercollegiate Athletic Association
- Record: 3–6 (1–1 SIAA)
- Head coach: Dudley Short (1st season)
- Captain: Walter Duncan

1896 Southern Intercollegiate Athletic Association football standings
	Conf.					Overall
Team	W		L		T	W		L		T
LSU +	3	–	0	–	0	6	–	0	–	0
Georgia +	2	–	0	–	0	4	–	0	–	0
Vanderbilt	2	–	0	–	2	3	–	2	–	2
Auburn	3	–	1	–	0	3	–	1	–	0
Texas	1	–	1	–	0	4	–	2	–	1
Alabama	1	–	1	–	0	2	–	1	–	0
Kentucky State College	1	–	1	–	0	3	–	6	–	0
Sewanee	3	–	3	–	0	3	–	3	–	0
Tennessee	0	–	0	–	0	4	–	0	–	0
Tulane	1	–	2	–	0	3	–	2	–	0
Nashville	0	–	1	–	1	0	–	1	–	1
Mercer	0	–	2	–	1	0	–	2	–	1
Central (KY)	0	–	2	–	1	0	–	3	–	1
Mississippi A&M	0	–	2	–	0	0	–	4	–	0
SW Presbyterian	0	–	2	–	0	0	–	3	–	0
Cumberland (TN)			–					–
+ – Conference co-champions

The 1896 Kentucky State College Blue and White football team represented Kentucky State College—now known as the University of Kentucky—as a member of the Southern Intercollegiate Athletic Association (SIAA) during the 1896 college football season. It was the school's first season as a member of the SIAA. Led by Dudley Short in his first and only season as head coach, the Blue and White compiled an overall record of 3–6 with a mark of 1–1 in SIAA play.

== Schedule ==
Date	Time	Opponent	Site	Result	Attendance	Source
October 3		Lexington Athletic Club	Lexington, KY	L 0–10		
October 10		Vanderbilt	Dudley Field; Nashville, TN (rivalry)	L 0–6	600	
October 17		Catlettsburg Athletic Club	Catlettsburg, KY	L 4–6		
October 24		Kentucky University	Lexington, KY	W 36–6		
October 31		Centre	Danville, KY (rivalry)	L 0–32		
November 7	3:30 p.m.	Central (KY)	Lexington, KY	W 62–0		
November 14		Centre	Lexington, KY	L 0–44		
November 21		at Georgetown (KY)	Georgetown, KY	W 16–0		
November 26		at Louisville Athletic Club	Louisville, KY	L 4–30		
All times are in Eastern time
