= 1896 Alabama Crimson White football team =

American college football season

1896 Alabama Crimson White football
- Conference: Southern Intercollegiate Athletic Association
- Record: 2–1 (1–1 SIAA)
- Head coach: Otto Wagonhurst (1st season)
- Captain: T. W. Powers
- Home stadium: The Quad

1896 Southern Intercollegiate Athletic Association football standings
	Conf.					Overall
Team	W		L		T	W		L		T
LSU +	3	–	0	–	0	6	–	0	–	0
Georgia +	2	–	0	–	0	4	–	0	–	0
Vanderbilt	2	–	0	–	2	3	–	2	–	2
Auburn	3	–	1	–	0	3	–	1	–	0
Texas	1	–	1	–	0	4	–	2	–	1
Alabama	1	–	1	–	0	2	–	1	–	0
Kentucky State College	1	–	1	–	0	3	–	6	–	0
Sewanee	3	–	3	–	0	3	–	3	–	0
Tennessee	0	–	0	–	0	4	–	0	–	0
Tulane	1	–	2	–	0	3	–	2	–	0
Nashville	0	–	1	–	1	0	–	1	–	1
Mercer	0	–	2	–	1	0	–	2	–	1
Central (KY)	0	–	2	–	1	0	–	3	–	1
Mississippi A&M	0	–	2	–	0	0	–	4	–	0
SW Presbyterian	0	–	2	–	0	0	–	3	–	0
Cumberland (TN)			–					–
+ – Conference co-champions

The 1896 Alabama Crimson White football team (Note: Alabama football teams were not referred to as the "Crimson Tide" until the 1907 season. Prior to 1907, the team was called the "Crimson White" from 1893 to 1906 and the "Cadets" in 1892.) (variously "Alabama", "UA" or "Bama") represented the University of Alabama in the 1896 Southern Intercollegiate Athletic Association football season. The team was led by head coach Otto Wagonhurst, in his first season, and played their home games at The Quad in Tuscaloosa, Alabama. In what was the fifth season of Alabama football, the team finished with a record of two wins and one loss (2–1, 1–1 SIAA).

In spring 1895, the university Board of Trustees passed a rule that prohibited athletic teams from competing off-campus for athletic events. As such, all games scheduled for the 1896 season were played on campus at The Quad. In their first game, Alabama shutout the Birmingham Athletic Club before they lost their only game of the season against Sewanee. The Crimson White then closed the season with their second shutout victory of the year against Mississippi A&M.

== Schedule ==
Date	Opponent	Site	Result	Source
October 24	Birmingham Athletic Club*	The Quad; Tuscaloosa, AL	W 30–0	
October 31	Sewanee	The Quad; Tuscaloosa, AL	L 6–10	
November 14	Mississippi A&M	The Quad; Tuscaloosa, AL (rivalry)	W 20–0	
*Non-conference game

(Note: For the 1896 season, point values were different from those used in contemporary games. In 1896 a touchdown was worth four points, a field goal was worth five points and an extra point (PAT) was worth two points.)

== Game summaries ==
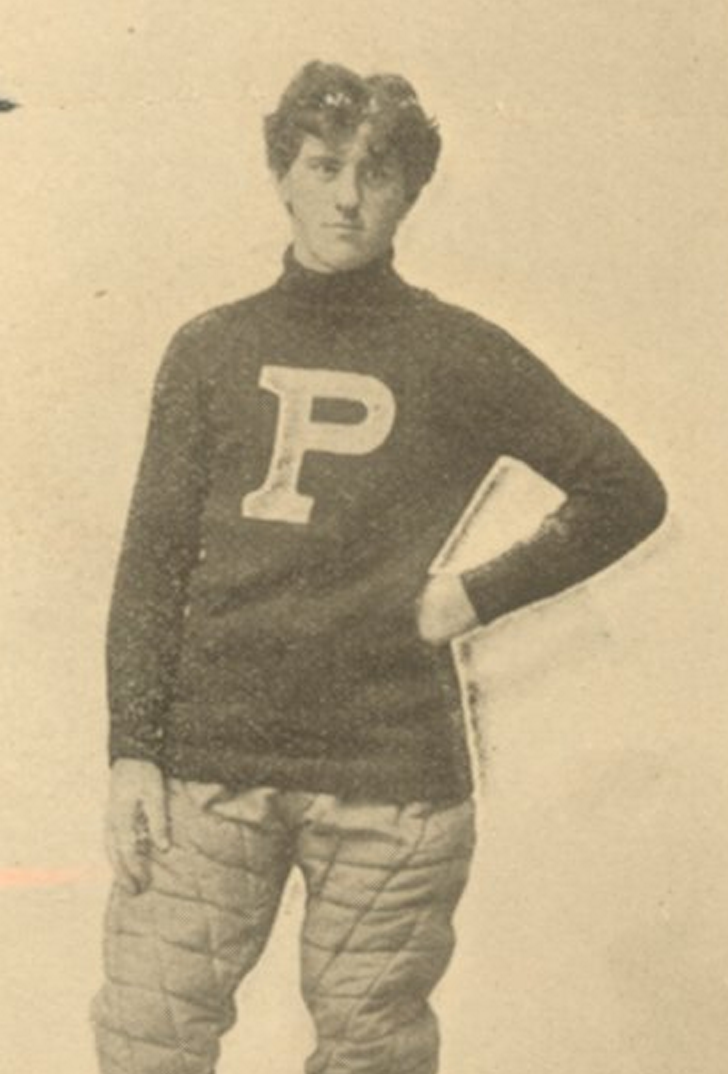
Head coach Otto Wagonhurst entered his only year as Alabama's head coach for the 1896 season.

=== Birmingham Athletic Club ===
In the first game played against the Birmingham Athletic Club (B.A.C.) since the 1893 season, Alabama defeated the Athletics 30–0 in Tuscaloosa. Alabama scored their first touchdown early in the first half when a B.A.C. fumble was recovered and returned 50-yards for a touchdown. They scored four more touchdowns and made five successful PAT's in their 30–0 shutout victory.

=== Sewanee ===
Against Sewanee, Alabama lost their first game of the season, 10–6.

=== Mississippi A&M ===
In their final game of the season, Alabama defeated the Mississippi A&M Aggies, 20–0, at Tuscaloosa in the first all-time meeting between the long-time rivals. Alabama took a 12–0 halftime lead after Putnam and Frank White scored touchdowns with A. B. McEachin converting both PAT's. In the second half Samuel Slone scored on a 45-yard touchdown run and the Aggies quarterback was sacked for a safety on the last play of the game to make the final score 20–0.

== Players ==
Alabama Crimson White 1896 roster
Guards: T. C. Marriott; W. Ward; Tackles: D. B. Adams; S. P. Johnson; J. S. Powers; W. B. Putnam	Center: A. B. McEachin; Ends: Eli Abbott; S. C. Pelham; W. T. White	Backs: Hill Ferguson; W. R. Shafer; Samuel Slone; Frank White; Quarterback: Borden Burr	Substitutes: R. E. Austill; W. C. Harkins; J. B. Killebrew; J. T. Weatherford; E. P. Wilson; L. B. Windham

== Staff ==
- Head coach: Otto Wagonhurst
- Manager: Champ Pickens
