= 1896 Vanderbilt Commodores football team =

American college football season

1896 Vanderbilt Commodores football
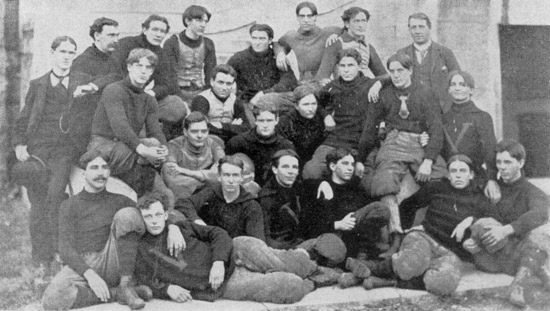
- Conference: Southern Intercollegiate Athletic Association
- Record: 3–2–2 (2–0–2 SIAA)
- Head coach: R. G. Acton (1st season)
- Captain: Phil Connell
- Home stadium: Dudley Field

1896 Southern Intercollegiate Athletic Association football standings
	Conf.					Overall
Team	W		L		T	W		L		T
LSU +	3	–	0	–	0	6	–	0	–	0
Georgia +	2	–	0	–	0	4	–	0	–	0
Vanderbilt	2	–	0	–	2	3	–	2	–	2
Auburn	3	–	1	–	0	3	–	1	–	0
Texas	1	–	1	–	0	4	–	2	–	1
Alabama	1	–	1	–	0	2	–	1	–	0
Kentucky State College	1	–	1	–	0	3	–	6	–	0
Sewanee	3	–	3	–	0	3	–	3	–	0
Tennessee	0	–	0	–	0	4	–	0	–	0
Tulane	1	–	2	–	0	3	–	2	–	0
Nashville	0	–	1	–	1	0	–	1	–	1
Mercer	0	–	2	–	1	0	–	2	–	1
Central (KY)	0	–	2	–	1	0	–	3	–	1
Mississippi A&M	0	–	2	–	0	0	–	4	–	0
SW Presbyterian	0	–	2	–	0	0	–	3	–	0
Cumberland (TN)			–					–
+ – Conference co-champions

The 1896 Vanderbilt Commodores football team represented Vanderbilt University during the 1896 Southern Intercollegiate Athletic Association football season. The team's head coach was R. G. Acton, who was in his first year at Vanderbilt and went on to coach two more. This was the first meeting of Vanderbilt and Kentucky.

== Schedule ==
Date	Time	Opponent	Site	Result	Attendance	Source
October 10		Kentucky State College	Dudley Field; Nashville, TN (rivalry)	W 6–0	600	
October 17		at Centre*	Danville, KY	L 0–46		
October 24		Central (KY)	Dudley Field; Nashville, TN	T 0–0		
November 7	2:30 p.m.	at Missouri*	Fair Grounds; St. Louis, MO	L 6–26		
November 11		at Southwestern Presbyterian	Baseball Park; Clarksville, TN	W 36–0		
November 14		Nashville	Dudley Field; Nashville, TN	T 0–0		
November 26		at Sewanee	Hardee Field; Sewanee, TN (rivalry)	W 10–4	2,500	
*Non-conference game
