= Harry Baum =

Biographical details
- Born: November 23, 1874; Indianola, Illinois, U.S.
- Died: March 3, 1950 (aged 75); Los Angeles County, California, U.S.

Playing career
- 1893–1895: Illinois
- Position: Halfback

Coaching career (HC unless noted)
- 1896: Tulane
- 1897: Illinois (assistant)

Head coaching record
- Overall: 3–2

Harry Wililiam Baum (November 23, 1874 – March 3, 1950) was an American college football coach and construction engineer. He served as the head coach at Tulane University in 1896. Baum attended the University of Illinois, where he played on the football team as a halfback.

== Biography ==
Baum attended the University of Illinois, where he played on the football team as a halfback. He graduated from Illinois in 1895 with a degree in civil engineering. After college, he undertook pneumatic foundation work in St. Louis, Missouri.

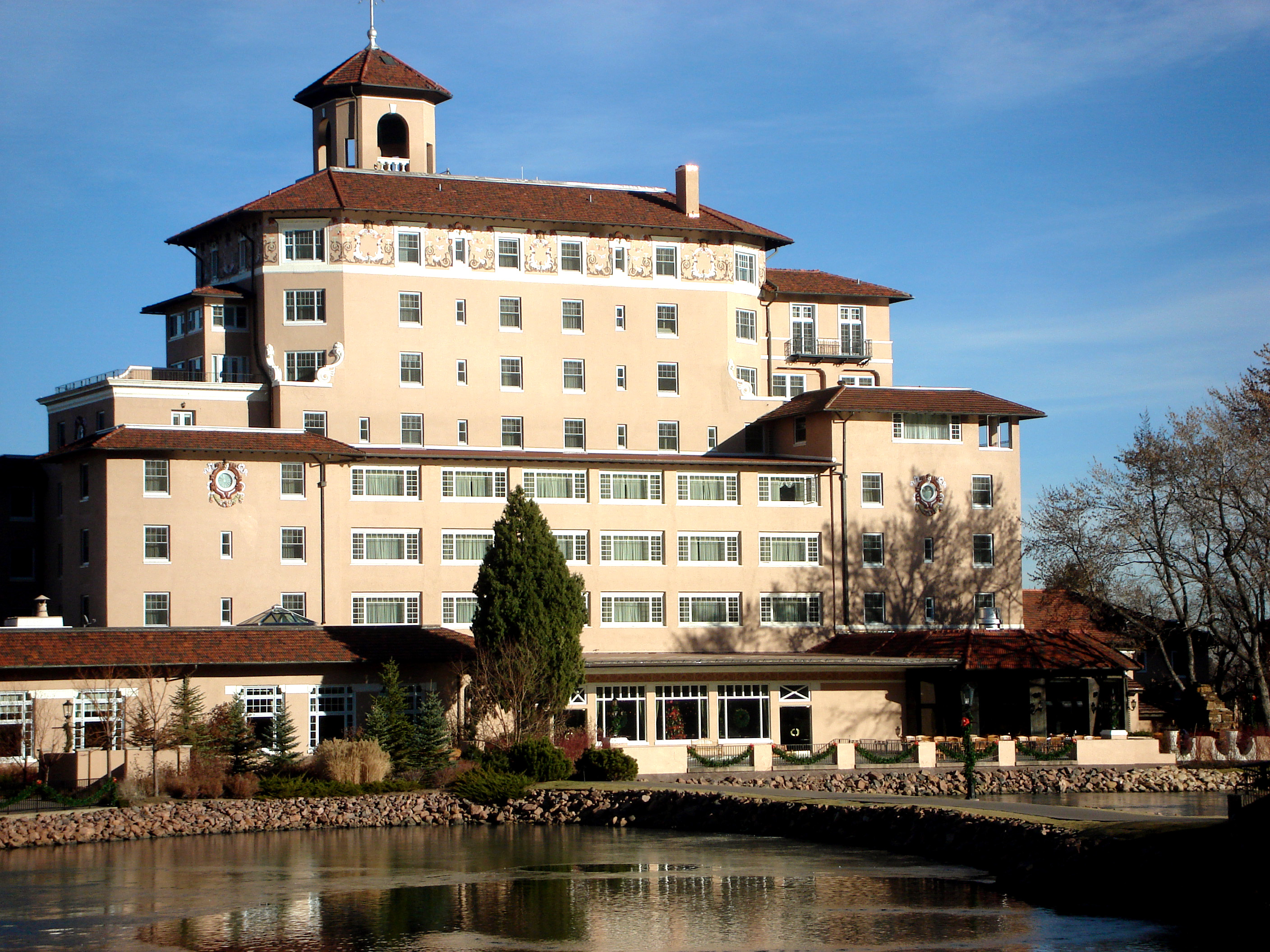
Baum worked on The Broadmoor resort as a construction engineer

He served as the first paid Tulane football coach in 1896. His salary was funded through gate receipts and monthly dues from members of the Tulane Athletic Association. He coached the Olive and Blue to a 3–2 record. In the game against Louisiana State, with Tulane leading, 2–0, Baum attempted to substitute a player not enrolled at the university. LSU's coach protested the substitution, and Tulane forfeited the game, which was recorded as a 6–0 decision in favor of LSU. After the season in its December meeting, the Southern Intercollegiate Athletic Association sanctioned the school by disallowing it to field an intercollegiate team the following year. Without a football team for the 1897 season, Baum left New Orleans. He returned to his alma mater to serve as an assistant coach under George Huff.

In 1920, Baum entered the engineering contracting business. He worked on the construction of the state capitol buildings in Salt Lake City, Oklahoma City, and Boise, Idaho, and the Broadmoor Hotel in Colorado Springs. Baum died on March 3, 1950.

== Head coaching record ==
Year	Team	Overall	Conference	Standing	Bowl/playoffs
Tulane Olive and Blue (Southern Intercollegiate Athletic Association) (1896)
1896	Tulane	3–2	1–2	10th	
Tulane:		3–2	1–2		
Total:		3–2			
