= R. M. Brown =

American sports coach (1885–1927)

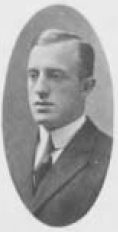
- Brown pictured in Bugle 1909, VPI yearbook

Biographical details
- Born: August 2, 1885; Elizabeth, New Jersey, U.S.
- Died: March 31, 1927 (aged 41); Elizabeth, New Jersey, U.S.

Playing career

Football
- 1907: Princeton
- Position: End

Coaching career (HC unless noted)

Football
- 1908: VPI
- 1909: Colgate

Basketball
- 1908–1909: VPI

Baseball
- 1909: VPI

Administrative career (AD unless noted)
- 1908: VPI

Head coaching record
- Overall: 10–6–1 (football); 4–2 (basketball); 11–6 (baseball)

Ralph Manning "Gus" Brown (August 2, 1885 – March 31, 1927) was an American college football, college basketball, and college baseball coach. He served as the head football coach at Virginia Agricultural and Mechanical College and Polytechnic Institute (VPI)—now known as Virginia Tech—in 1908, and at Colgate University in 1909, compiling a career college football coaching record of 10–6–1. Brown also coached the basketball team at Virginia Tech in 1908–09 and the baseball team there in the spring of 1909.

On March 31, 1927, Brown died in hospital after he was struck by an automobile while walking near his home.

== Head coaching record ==
=== Football ===
Year	Team	Overall	Conference	Standing	Bowl/playoffs
VPI (South Atlantic Intercollegiate Athletic Association) (1908)
1908	VPI	5–4	1–2	T–5th	
VPI:		5–4	1–2		
Colgate (Independent) (1909)
1909	Colgate	5–2–1			
Colgate:		5–2–1			
Total:		10–6–1			
