= J. B. Hildebrand =

American football coach and civil engineer (c. 1893 – 1952

Biographical details
- Born: c. 1873; Memphis, Tennessee, U.S.
- Died: November 18, 1952; Memphis, Tennessee, U.S.

Playing career
- 1892–1895: Vanderbilt
- Position: Guard

Coaching career (HC unless noted)
- 1896: Mississippi A&M

Head coaching record
- Overall: 0–4

James Bell Hildebrand (c. 1873 – November 18, 1952) was an American college football player and coach and civil engineer. He served as the head football coach Mississippi Agricultural & Mechanical College—now known as Mississippi State University—for the 1896 season. Hildebrand was hired as the first full-time head coach at the school after the student body raised $300 ($11,610 in 2025 dollars) to hire him. During his one-season tenure, Hildebrand compiled a record of 0–4.

Hildebrand was born in the Whitehaven neighborhood of Memphis, Tennessee. He attended Whitehaven High School in Memphis and The Webb School in Bell Buckle, Tennessee. Hildebrand graduated from Vanderbilt University with a degree in civil engineering. He and Heiskell Weatherford had a civil engineering practice in Memphis. Hildebrand later worked in the oil industry in Little Rock, Arkansas. He died on November 18, 1952, at Cage Nursing Home in Memphis, following a long illness.

== Head coaching record ==
Year	Team	Overall	Conference	Standing	Bowl/playoffs
Mississippi A&M Aggies (Southern Intercollegiate Athletic Association) (1896)
1896	Mississippi A&M	0–4	0–2		
Mississippi A&M:		0–4	0–2		
Total:		0–4			
