= 1896 LSU Tigers football team =

American college football season

1896 LSU Tigers football
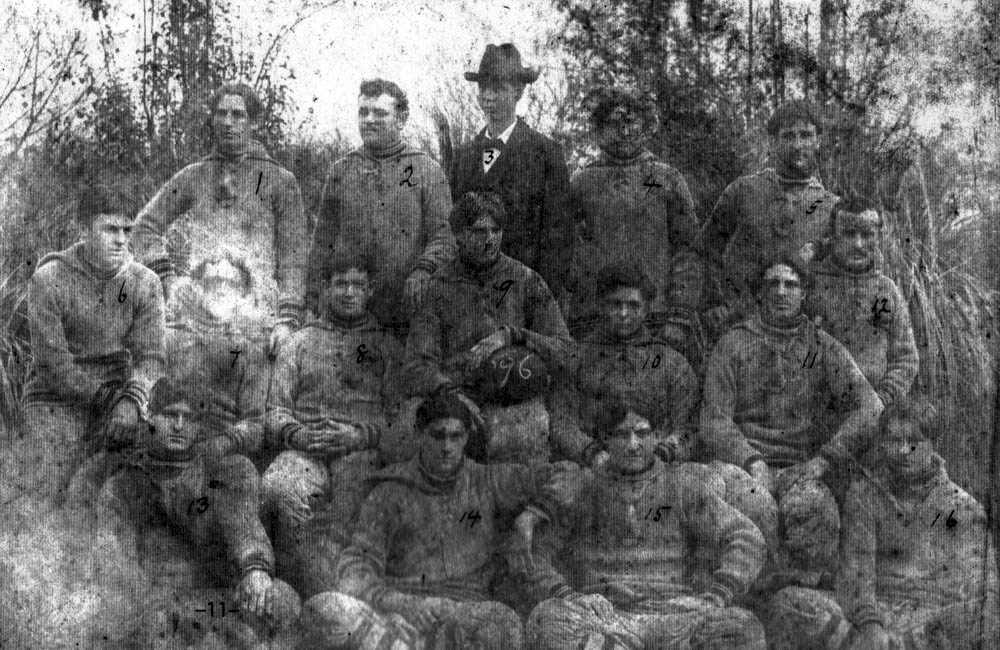

SIAA co-champion State champion
- Conference: Southern Intercollegiate Athletic Association
- Record: 6–0 (3–0 SIAA)
- Head coach: Allen Jeardeau (1st season)
- Captain: Edwin A. Scott
- Home stadium: State Field

1896 Southern Intercollegiate Athletic Association football standings
	Conf.					Overall
Team	W		L		T	W		L		T
LSU +	3	–	0	–	0	6	–	0	–	0
Georgia +	2	–	0	–	0	4	–	0	–	0
Vanderbilt	2	–	0	–	2	3	–	2	–	2
Auburn	3	–	1	–	0	3	–	1	–	0
Texas	1	–	1	–	0	4	–	2	–	1
Alabama	1	–	1	–	0	2	–	1	–	0
Kentucky State College	1	–	1	–	0	3	–	6	–	0
Sewanee	3	–	3	–	0	3	–	3	–	0
Tennessee	0	–	0	–	0	4	–	0	–	0
Tulane	1	–	2	–	0	3	–	2	–	0
Nashville	0	–	1	–	1	0	–	1	–	1
Mercer	0	–	2	–	1	0	–	2	–	1
Central (KY)	0	–	2	–	1	0	–	3	–	1
Mississippi A&M	0	–	2	–	0	0	–	4	–	0
SW Presbyterian	0	–	2	–	0	0	–	3	–	0
Cumberland (TN)			–					–
+ – Conference co-champions

The 1896 LSU Tigers football team represented Louisiana State University (LSU) during the 1896 Southern Intercollegiate Athletic Association football season. This was LSU's first season playing as a member of the Southern Intercollegiate Athletic Association (SIAA). The Tigers, led by coach Allen Jeardeau, went undefeated and were the SIAA co-champions. It was LSU's second undefeated season in football. The 1896 team was also the first LSU team to use the nickname "Tigers".

== Before the season ==
Allen Jeardeau was hired as head coach.

== Schedule ==
Date	Time	Opponent	Site	Result	Attendance	Source
October 10	4:00 p.m.	Centenary*	State Field; Baton Rouge, LA	W 46–0		
October 24		at Tulane	Tulane Athletic Field; New Orleans, LA (rivalry)	W 6–0		
November 13	3:25 p.m.	vs. Ole Miss*	Vicksburg Fairgrounds; Vicksburg, MS (rivalry)	W 12–4		
November 16	3:30 p.m.	Texas	State Field; Baton Rouge, LA	W 14–0		
November 20		Mississippi A&M	State Field; Baton Rouge, LA (rivalry)	W 52–0		
November 28	3:00 p.m.	at Southern Athletic Club*	Sportsman's Park; New Orleans, LA	W 6–0	500	
*Non-conference game

== Roster ==
Player	Position	Height	Weight	Hometown	High School
James Hughes Arrighi	Tackle	-	-	Natchez, MS	-
James S. Atkinson	Center	-	150	Ruston, LA	-
Aristide Tillou Barbin	-	5-10	165	Marksville, LA	-
Edmund Auguste M. Chavanne	Center	-	-	Lake Charles, LA	-
Armand P. Daspit	Halfback	-	145	Houma, LA	-
Justin C. Daspit	Halfback	-	150	Houma, LA	-
Samuel A. Gourrier	Quarterback, Halfback	-	150	Baton Rouge, LA	-
James F. Harp	-	-	-	Bonita, LA	-
Phillip P. Huyck	Guard	-	180	Baton Rouge, LA	-
Sam Lambert	Fullback	-	150	Baton Rouge, LA	-
Wiltz M. Ledbetter	Guard	-	-	Summerfield, LA	-
Gordon B. Nicholson	Fullback	-	160	Baton Rouge, LA	-
Archie Ed Robertson	Fullback	-	165	Plaquemine, LA	-
John R. Salassi	Guard	-	-	French Settlement, LA	-
Frederick H. Schneider	Guard	-	-	Lake Providence, LA	-
George C. Schoenberger	End	-	-	Buras, LA	-
Edwin A. Scott†	Guard	-	170	Wilson, LA	-
William S. Slaughter	End	-	150	Port Hudson, LA	-
John T. Westbrook	End	-	145	Baton Rouge, LA	-

† -Team Captain
Roster from Fanbase.com and LSU: The Louisiana Tigers

== Game summaries ==
=== Centenary ===
Team	1	2	Total
Centenary	0	0	0
• LSU	24	22	46

- Location: State Field
  Baton Rouge, Louisiana
- Game start: 4:00 p. m.

LSU easily defeated Centenary 46–0. Robertson went around right end for the first touchdown. The starting lineup was Westbrook (left end), Nicholson (left tackle), Huyck (left guard), Atkinson (center), Scott (right guard), Robertson (right tackle), Slaughter (right end), Gourrier (quarterback), J. Daspit (left halfback), A. Daspit (right halfback), Lambert (fullback).

=== Tulane ===
Tulane tried to use George H. Brooke (pictured).

The Tulane game of this year was forfeited during the game due to Tulane having fielded an ineligible player. At the time that the game was declared forfeit, Tulane was leading with a score of 2 to nothing. About 10 minutes into the second half, LSU was moving the ball toward the goal line when a Tulane player named Depleche was injured. The injured player was replaced by George H. Brooke. LSU ran another play and gained 5 yards before realizing the identity of this substitute Tulane player. LSU's team captain, Edwin A. Scott protested to the game's referee, Lieutenant Wall. Scott cited the rules of the SIAA and the mutual pre-game agreement between the schools as reasons that Brooke should be declared ineligible to play. Tulane's team captain, Louis J. Genella, refused to take Brooke out of the game and stated that Tulane refused to play without him. After a lengthy debate, the referee ruled that Brooke could not play, and that Tulane forfeited the game by refusing to play without him.

During the debate, Tulane argued that Brooke, who was previously a two time All-American at Pennsylvania, planned to enroll as a graduate student at Tulane. Brooke refused to sign an affidavit stating his intention to enroll at Tulane, as he was already enrolled in law school at the University of Pennsylvania. Due to the forfeiture, the official score was set at LSU 6, Tulane 0. Dr. William Dudley, President of the SIAA, later ruled that the game referee was right to declare the game forfeited and that men planning to enter a school were not eligible to play. Dudley ruled that prospective players should be enrolled for two weeks before being allowed to play in a game.

=== Ole Miss ===
Team	1	2	Total
• LSU	6	6	12
Ole Miss	0	6	6

- Location: Vicksburg, MS
- Game start: 3:25 p. m.

LSU defeated Ole Miss 12–6. The game was "close and hard" for the first ten minutes, then LSU made a touchdown. LSU scored again in the second half after continuous gains. Then Ole Miss scored late, "by the hardest sort of playing". The extra point attempt hit the crossbar.

The starting lineup was A. Daspit (left end), Arrighi (left tackle), Huyck (left guard), Chavanne (center), Schneider (right guard), Scott (right tackle), Slaughter (right end), J. Daspit (quarterback), Schoenberger (left halfback), Gourrier (right halfback), Nicholson (fullback).

=== Texas ===
Team	1	2	Total
Texas	0	0	0
• LSU	10	4	14

- Location: State Field
  Baton Rouge, LA

The Cadets defeated the Texas team 14–0. Sam Gourrier made the first touchdown around Texas' left end. The Times Picayune reported "The cadets are wild tonight over the victory".

=== Mississippi A&M ===
Team	1	2	Total
Miss. A&M	0	0	0
• LSU	14	38	52

- Location: State Field
  Baton Rouge, Louisiana

The Cadets slaughtered the Mississippi Aggies 52–0.

=== Southern A. C. ===
Team	1	2	Total
• LSU	6	0	6
Southern A. C.	0	0	0

- Location: New Orleans, Louisiana
- Game start: 3:00 p. m.
- Game attendance: 500

On a cold, dreary day, LSU defeated the Southern Athletic Club 6–0 to secure the state championship. LSU's Robertson got the deciding touchdown. Rain started to pour as soon as the game ended.

== Postseason ==
LSU and Pop Warner's Georgia team tied for the SIAA title. Harper's Weekly reported that, aside from the Tulane game, the season was a very clean one. LSU played no ineligible players, was never penalized for slugging, and never complained about the officiating.
