= 1896 Tulane Olive and Blue football team =

American college football season

1896 Tulane Olive and Blue football
- Conference: Southern Intercollegiate Athletic Association
- Record: 3–2 (1–2 SIAA)
- Head coach: Harry Baum (1st season)
- Captain: Louis J. Genella

1896 Southern Intercollegiate Athletic Association football standings
	Conf.					Overall
Team	W		L		T	W		L		T
LSU +	3	–	0	–	0	6	–	0	–	0
Georgia +	2	–	0	–	0	4	–	0	–	0
Vanderbilt	2	–	0	–	2	3	–	2	–	2
Auburn	3	–	1	–	0	3	–	1	–	0
Texas	1	–	1	–	0	4	–	2	–	1
Alabama	1	–	1	–	0	2	–	1	–	0
Kentucky State College	1	–	1	–	0	3	–	6	–	0
Sewanee	3	–	3	–	0	3	–	3	–	0
Tennessee	0	–	0	–	0	4	–	0	–	0
Tulane	1	–	2	–	0	3	–	2	–	0
Nashville	0	–	1	–	1	0	–	1	–	1
Mercer	0	–	2	–	1	0	–	2	–	1
Central (KY)	0	–	2	–	1	0	–	3	–	1
Mississippi A&M	0	–	2	–	0	0	–	4	–	0
SW Presbyterian	0	–	2	–	0	0	–	3	–	0
Cumberland (TN)			–					–
+ – Conference co-champions

The 1896 Tulane Olive and Blue football team represented Tulane University during the 1896 Southern Intercollegiate Athletic Association football season. The game against LSU of this year was forfeited during the game due to Tulane having fielded an ineligible player. At the time that the game was declared forfeit, Tulane was leading with a score of 2–0. Due to the forfeiture, the official score was set at LSU 6, Tulane 0 by the game's referee. In addition to the forfeiture, Tulane was further sanctioned by the SIAA by being barred from fielding a team in intercollegiate play for the 1897 season.

== Schedule ==
Date	Time	Opponent	Site	Result	Attendance	Source
October 17		Tulane alumni*	Tulane Athletic Field; New Orleans, LA	W 12–0		
October 24		LSU	Tulane Athletic Field; New Orleans, LA (rivalry)	L 0–6 (forfeit)		
November 9		at Vicksburg Athletic Club*	Vicksburg, MS	W 48–0		
November 14	3:30 p.m.	Texas	Tulane Athletic Field; New Orleans, LA	L 4–12	800	
November 26		Ole Miss	Tulane Athletic Field; New Orleans, LA (rivalry)	W 10–0		
*Non-conference game

== Game summaries ==
=== LSU ===
The Tulane-LSU game of this year was forfeited during the game due to Tulane having fielded an ineligible player. At the time that the game was declared forfeit, Tulane was leading with a score of 2 to nothing. About 10 minutes into the second half, LSU was moving the ball toward the goal line when a Tulane player named Depleche was injured. The injured player was replaced by George H. Brooke. LSU ran another play and gained 5 yards before realizing the identity of this substitute Tulane player. LSU's team captain, Edwin A. Scott, protested to the game's referee, Lieutenant Wall. Scott cited the rules of the SIAA and the mutual pre-game agreement between the schools as reasons that Brooke should be declared ineligible to play. Tulane's team captain, Louis J. Genella, refused to take Brooke out of the game and stated that Tulane refused to play without him. After a lengthy debate, the referee ruled that Brooke could not play, and that Tulane forfeited the game by refusing to play without him. During the debate, Tulane argued that Brooke, who was previously a two time All-American at Pennsylvania, planned to enroll as a graduate student at Tulane. Brooke refused to sign an affidavit stating his intention to enroll at Tulane, as he was already enrolled in law school at the University of Pennsylvania. Due to the forfeiture, the official score was set at LSU 6, Tulane 0 by the game's referee. Dr. William Dudley, of the SIAA, later ruled that the game referee was right to declare the game forfeited and that men planning to enter a school were not eligible to play. Dudley ruled that prospective players should be enrolled for two weeks before being allowed to play in a game.

== Roster ==
No.	Player	Position	Height	Weight	Hometown	High School
–	J. R. Bowling	Right tackle	–	–	–	–
†	Louis Bush	Left half back	–	–	–	–
–	J. P. Butler, Jr.	Left guard	–	–	–	–
–	F. C. Claiborne	Substitute	–	–	–	–
–	A. Dupleche	Substitute	–	–	–	–
–	R. Finley	Center	–	–	–	–
–	Louis J. Genella	Right guard	–	–	–	–
–	B. W. Henry	Substitute	–	–	–	–
–	E. C. Hyatt	Left tackle	–	–	–	–
–	Eads Johnson	Fullback	–	–	–	–
–	J. B. Perkins	Substitute	–	–	–	–
–	R. Perry	Left end	–	–	–	–
–	S. S. Rubira, Jr.	Right half back	–	–	–	–
–	W. D. Wills	Quarterback	–	–	–	–
–	E. Woods	Right end	–	–	–	–

† -Team Captain
Roster from 1897 Tulane Jambalaya Yearbook
