= Allen Jeardeau =

American football and baseball coach

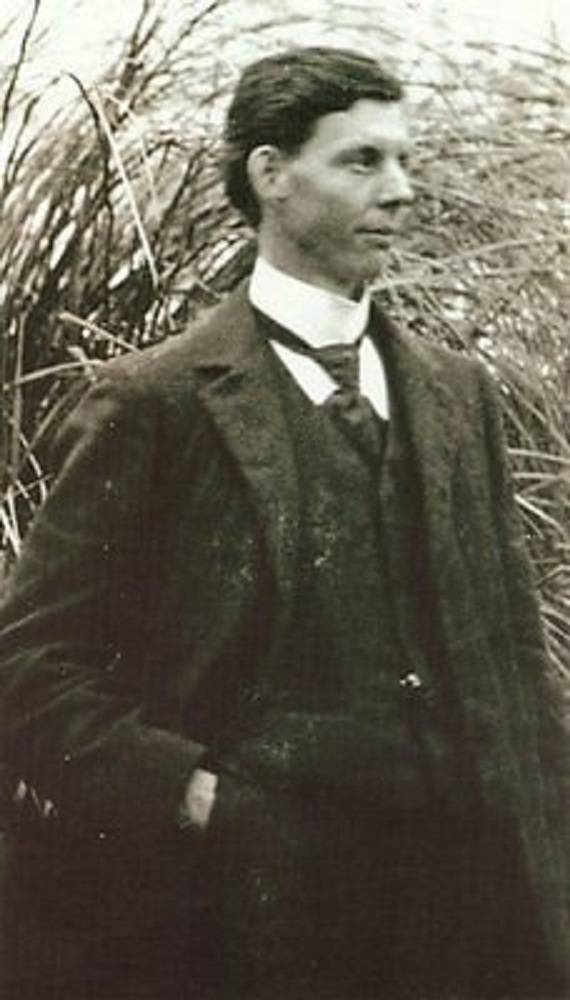
- Jeardeau in 1897

Biographical details
- Born: April 1, 1866; Grant County, Wisconsin, U.S.
- Died: April 10, 1900 (aged 34); Grant County, Wisconsin, U.S.

Coaching career (HC unless noted)

Football
- 1895: Platteville Normal
- 1896–1897: LSU
- 1898: Platteville Normal

Baseball
- 1898: LSU

Head coaching record
- Overall: 10–2–1 (football); 2–3 (baseball)

Accomplishments and honors

Championships
- Football; 1 SIAA (1896)

Allen Wilson Jeardeau (April 1, 1866 – April 10, 1900) was an American college football and college baseball coach. He served as the head football coach at the Platteville Normal School—now the University of Wisconsin–Platteville—in 1895 and 1898 and at Louisiana State University (LSU) from 1896 to 1897. In 1896, his first season with the LSU Tigers, Jeardeau led the team to a 6–0 record and a Southern Intercollegiate Athletic Association (SIAA) championship. He was also the head coach of the LSU Tigers baseball team in 1898. Jeardeau was a graduate of the Platteville Normal School and a student at Harvard University. He died of pneumonia on April 10, 1900, at his home near Platteville, Wisconsin.

== Head coaching record ==
=== Football ===
Year	Team	Overall	Conference	Standing	Bowl/playoffs
Platteville Normal Pioneers (Independent) (1895)
1895	Platteville Normal	3–0–1			
LSU Tigers (Southern Intercollegiate Athletic Association) (1896–1897)
1896	LSU	6–0	4–0	T–1st	
1897	LSU	1–1	0–0		
LSU:		7–1	4–0		
Platteville Normal Pioneers (Independent) (1898)
1898	Platteville Normal	0–1			
Platteville Normal:		3–1–1			
Total:		10–2–1			
National championship Conference title Conference division title or championship game berth

=== Baseball ===
Record table
Season	Team	Overall	Conference	Standing	Postseason
LSU Tigers (Southern Intercollegiate Athletic Association) (1898–1898)
1898	LSU	2–3			
LSU:		2–3 (.400)			
Total:		2–3 (.400)			
