= 1896 Auburn Tigers football team =

American college football season

1896 Auburn Tigers football
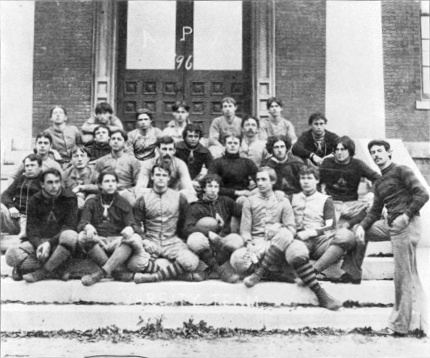
- Coach John Heisman is standing at the bottom right of the photo. Team captain Reynolds Tichenor is holding the football in the center.
- Conference: Southern Intercollegiate Athletic Association
- Record: 3–1 (2–1 SIAA)
- Head coach: John Heisman (2nd season)
- Captain: Reynolds Tichenor
- Home stadium: Drill Field

1896 Southern Intercollegiate Athletic Association football standings
	Conf.					Overall
Team	W		L		T	W		L		T
LSU +	3	–	0	–	0	6	–	0	–	0
Georgia +	2	–	0	–	0	4	–	0	–	0
Vanderbilt	2	–	0	–	2	3	–	2	–	2
Tennessee	1	–	0	–	0	4	–	0	–	0
Auburn	3	–	1	–	0	3	–	1	–	0
Texas	1	–	1	–	0	4	–	2	–	1
Alabama	1	–	1	–	0	2	–	1	–	0
Kentucky State College	1	–	1	–	0	3	–	6	–	0
Sewanee	3	–	3	–	0	3	–	3	–	0
Tulane	1	–	2	–	0	3	–	2	–	0
Nashville	0	–	1	–	1	0	–	1	–	1
Mercer	0	–	2	–	1	0	–	2	–	1
Central (KY)	0	–	2	–	1	0	–	3	–	1
Mississippi A&M	0	–	2	–	0	0	–	4	–	0
SW Presbyterian	0	–	2	–	0	0	–	3	–	0
Cumberland (TN)			–					–
+ – Conference co-champions

The 1896 Auburn Tigers football team represented Auburn University in the 1896 Southern Intercollegiate Athletic Association football season. It was the Tigers' fifth season. The team was led by head coach John Heisman, in his second year, and finished with a record of three wins and one loss (3–1 overall, 2–1 in the SIAA). The team's captain was Reynolds Tichenor.

The Georgia–Auburn game was a 12 to 6 victory by Georgia to finish its first undefeated season under Pop Warner. The game featured Tichenor's brilliant punt returns.

== Schedule ==
Date	Opponent	Site	Result	Source
October 17	at Mercer	Central City Park; Macon, GA	W 46–0	
November 7	Georgia Tech	Drill Field; Auburn, AL (rivalry)	W 40–0	
November 16	Sewanee	Riverside Park; Montgomery, AL	W 38–6	
November 26	at Georgia	Brisbine Park; Atlanta, GA (rivalry)	L 6–12	
