= Otto Wagonhurst =

American football player and coach (1871–1932)

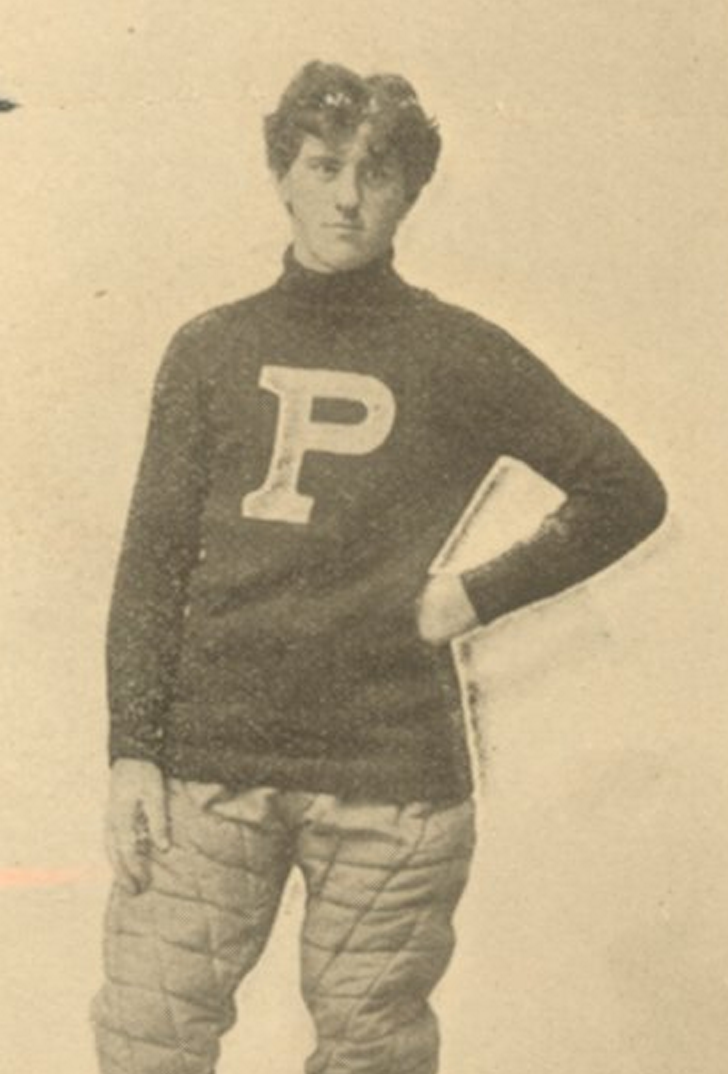
- Wagonhurst at Penn, c. 1893

Biographical details
- Born: April 25, 1871; Gouldsboro, Pennsylvania, U.S.
- Died: June 15, 1932 (aged 61); Jackson, Michigan, U.S.

Playing career
- 1892–1895: Penn
- 1898–1899: Duquesne Country and AC
- 1900: Homestead Library & AC
- Position: Tackle

Coaching career (HC unless noted)
- 1896: Alabama
- 1897: Iowa

Head coaching record
- Overall: 6–5

Otman Franklin "Otto" Wagonhurst (sometimes spelled Wagenhorst or Wagenhurst; April 25, 1871 – June 15, 1932) was an American football player and coach. Wagonhurst played college football as a left tackle at the University of Pennsylvania from 1892 to 1895. He served as the head football coach at the University of Alabama in 1896 and at the University of Iowa in 1897, compiling a career record of 6–5. After coaching college football, he played professionally for Pittsburgh's Duquesne Country and Athletic Club and the Homestead Library and Athletic Club. He won circuit championship titles with Duquesne in 1898 and 1899 and Homestead in 1900. After his football career, he went on to become a railway executive. He died in 1932 in Jackson, Michigan and was buried in Akron, Ohio.

He was a brother of Woody Wagenhorst, head football coach at the University of Pennsylvania and briefly a major league baseball player, and Jim Wagenhorst, athlete at Penn and football player and manager for the Duquesne Country and Athletic Club.

== Head coaching record ==
Year	Team	Overall	Conference	Standing	Bowl/playoffs
Alabama Crimson White (Southern Intercollegiate Athletic Association) (1896)
1896	Alabama	2–1	1–1		
Alabama:		2–1	1–1		
Iowa Hawkeyes (Western Interstate University Football Association) (1897)
1897	Iowa	4–4	0–2	T–3rd	
Iowa:		4–4	0–2		
Total:		6–5			
