= New Orleans Athletic Club =

Athletic organisation in Louisiana

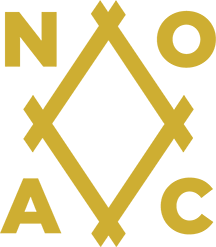

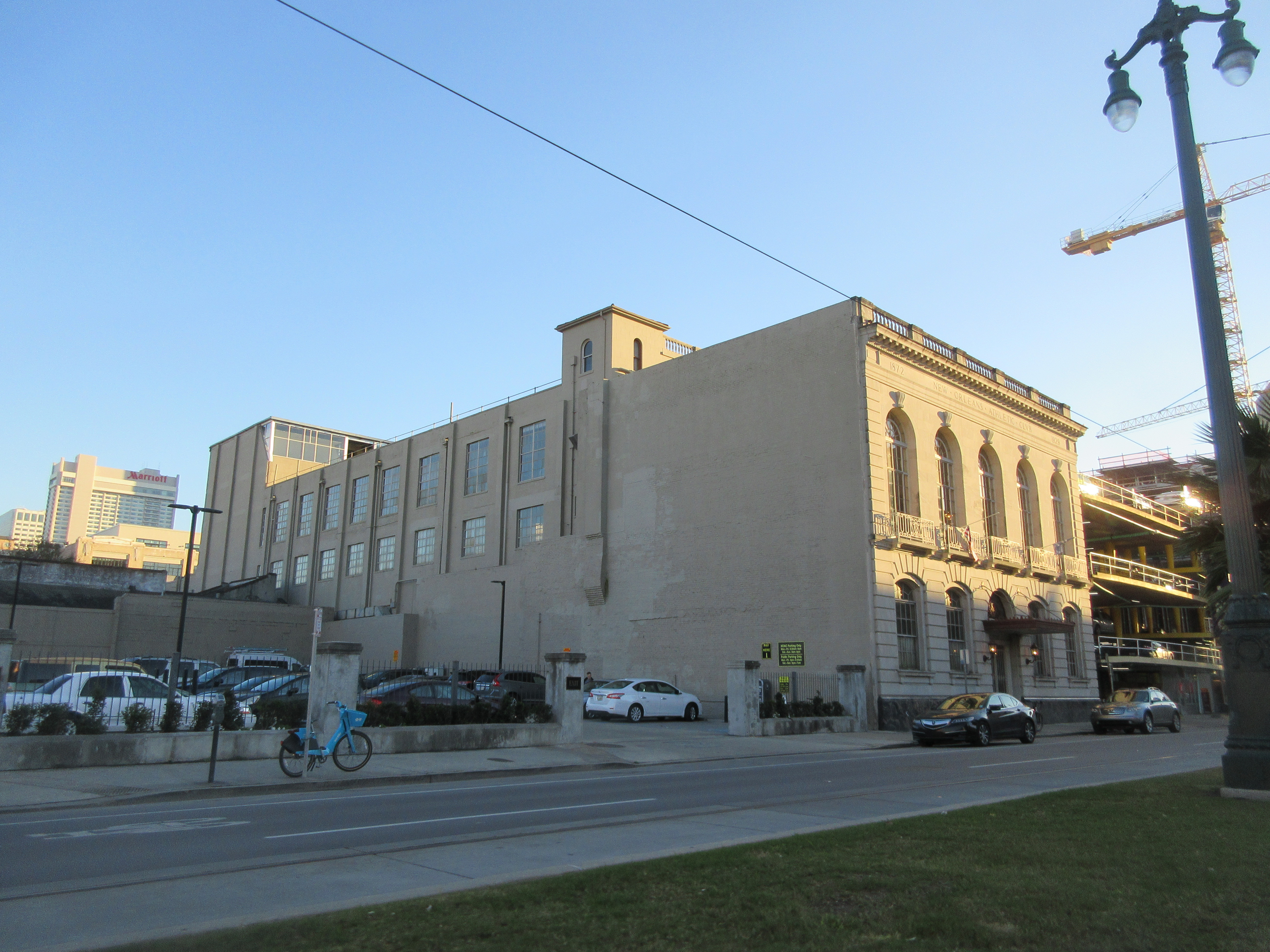

General information
- Type: Private club
- Location: 222 N. Rampart Street; New Orleans, Louisiana 70112
- Coordinates: 29.9568°N 90.0713°W
- Completed: 1929

Technical details
- Floor count: 4

Design and construction
- Architect(s): Diboll & Owen

New Orleans Athletic Club (NOAC) is an American athletic organization founded in 1872, making it the second-oldest such institution in the United States. It is located at 222 North Rampart Street in New Orleans, Louisiana.

== History ==
The club was formed by J.C Aleix and several other young men who built two gymnastic apparatus' in the back yard of Aleix's home, and called themselves the Independent Gymnastic Club. J.C Aleix was elected president and each member paid fifty cents per month. The members participated in gymnastic exercises including fencing and boxing. The club's motto was "Mens Sana in Corpore Sano" ("A healthy mind will exist in a healthy body"), and its colors were gold and black. The original constitution called for no more than fourteen members, and specified that the president be of gentlemanly deportment and be impartial. By 1873, in spite of the restrictions in the constitution, the club had fifty members, and set about looking for a suitable club building. In 1874, the Independent Gymnastic Club set up its equipment in a building at the corner of Rampart and Bienville Streets.

In 1875, Edw. Fredericks became the second president and members voted to change the name of the club to the Young Men's Gymnastics Club. In 1884, the club bought the property at 37-39-41 Burgundy Street for $6,000 and in 1888 a stock corporation was inaugurated. In 1890, the club constructed a new gymnasium, baths, swimming pool and held professional boxing matches at 44 North Rampart Street.

In 1907, Hall of Fame trainer and coach Tad Gormley moved to New Orleans to become the physical director at the Young Men's Gymnastics Club. In 1918, members of the club showed off their athletic skills while portraying apes in the first Tarzan movie, Tarzan of the Apes.

By 1920 the club had about 600 members, but its building was run down and there was no money to repair it. Irwin F. Poche, the athletic director, began to promote health and fitness classes for businessmen. He set up a handball court, organized dances in the gym and boxing matches were also organized; membership began to increase. In 1929, a new building was built at its present location and the club became known as the New Orleans Athletic Club. NOAC hosted the LHSAA state wrestling tournament in 1945 and 1947 to 1968.

In addition to athletic events, NOAC hosts charity balls and events in its ballroom. In 1991, the club opened membership to women.

== Sports and facilities ==
- Aerobics
- Badminton
- Basketball
- Boxing
- Dance
- Fencing
- Gymnastics
- Handball
- Isometric exercise
- Karate
- Kendo
- Racquetball
- Running
- Softball (formerly indoor baseball)
- Squash
- Swimming
- Tai Chi
- Trampolining
- Volleyball
- Weightlifting
- Wrestling
- Yoga

== Notable members and people ==
Many well known athletes have trained at NOAC. John L. Sullivan and Roberto Durán trained there before boxing matches; Johnny Weissmuller swam in the saltwater pool; and John Havlicek and Kareem Abdul-Jabbar played basketball and gave basketball clinics at the club.

Celebrities that have trained at NOAC include Alec Baldwin, Harry Connick Jr., Kevin Costner, Tom Foley, Clark Gable, Jimmy the Greek, Phil Harris, Bob Hope, Kate Hudson, Frankie Laine, Jude Law, Art Linkletter, Sean Meenan, Louis Prima, Liv Tyler, Mark Wahlberg and Tennessee Williams.

Politicians and other notable people that have trained at NOAC include D.A. Jim Garrison, Huey, Earl and Russell B. Long, Robert Maestri, Robert S. Maloney and T. Semmes Walmsley.

== Television and film ==
- A Little Bit of Heaven
- Black Magic (ESPN Films documentary)
- Bullet to the Head
- Dylan Dog: Dead of Night
- Glory Road
- Green Book
- Hard Times
- Lolita
- NCIS: New Orleans
- Pretty Baby
- Runaway Jury
- Scream Queens
- Stolen
- Tarzan: Lord of the Louisiana Jungle
- The Astronaut Wives Club
- The Big Short
- The Mechanic
