= 1900 Southern Intercollegiate Athletic Association football season =

- League: NCAA
- Sport: College football
- Duration: September 29, 1900 through December 5, 1900
- Teams: 21

Regular Season
- Season champions: Clemson

Football seasons
- ← 1899 1901 →

1900 Southern Intercollegiate Athletic Association football standings
| | Conf. | | | | | Overall |
| Team | W | | L | | T | W | | L | | T |
|---|---|---|---|---|---|---|---|---|---|---|
| Clemson + | 2 | – | 0 | – | 0 | 6 | – | 0 | – | 0 |
| Auburn | 4 | – | 0 | – | 0 | 4 | – | 0 | – | 0 |
| Tulane | 3 | – | 0 | – | 0 | 5 | – | 0 | – | 0 |
| Texas | 1 | – | 0 | – | 0 | 6 | – | 0 | – | 0 |
| Sewanee + | 5 | – | 0 | – | 1 | 6 | – | 1 | – | 1 |
| North Carolina | 3 | – | 0 | – | 1 | 4 | – | 1 | – | 3 |
| Vanderbilt | 2 | – | 3 | – | 1 | 4 | – | 4 | – | 1 |
| Alabama | 1 | – | 3 | – | 0 | 2 | – | 3 | – | 0 |
| Nashville | 1 | – | 3 | – | 0 | 2 | – | 3 | – | 0 |
| Georgia | 1 | – | 4 | – | 0 | 2 | – | 4 | – | 0 |
| Tennessee | 0 | – | 2 | – | 1 | 3 | – | 2 | – | 1 |
| Cumberland (TN) | 0 | – | 1 | – | 0 | 0 | – | 1 | – | 0 |
| LSU | 0 | – | 1 | – | 0 | 2 | – | 2 | – | 0 |
| Kentucky State | 0 | – | 2 | – | 0 | 4 | – | 6 | – | 0 |
| Ole Miss | 0 | – | 3 | – | 0 | 0 | – | 3 | – | 0 |
| Georgia Tech | 0 | – | 3 | – | 0 | 0 | – | 4 | – | 0 |
$ – Conference champion

The 1900 Southern Intercollegiate Athletic Association football season was the college football games played by the member schools of the Southern Intercollegiate Athletic Association as part of the 1900 college football season. The season began on September 29.

The season saw the rise of Clemson's football program, the return of Alabama football, and the first season of play for Henry D. Phillips.

== Results and team statistics ==
| Conf. Rank | Team | Head coach | Conf. record | Win Pct. | Overall record | PPG | PAG |
|---|---|---|---|---|---|---|---|
| 1 (tie) | Auburn | Billy Watkins | 4–0–0 | 1.000. | 4–0–0 | 37.0 | 1.3 |
| 1 (tie) | Tulane | H. T. Summersgill | 3–0–0 | 1.000 | 5–0–0 | 21.0 | 0.0 |
| 1 (tie) | Clemson | John Heisman | 2–0–0 | 1.000 | 6–0–0 | 37.0 | 1.7 |
| 1 (tie) | Texas | S. H. Thompson | 1–0–0 | 1.000 | 6–0–0 | 18.8 | 2.2 |
| 5 | Sewanee | Billy Suter | 5–0–1 | .917 | 6–1–1 | 16.8 | 3.4 |
| 6 | North Carolina | Billy Reynolds | 3–0–1 | .875 | 4–1–3 | 20.4 | 2.7 |
| 7 | Vanderbilt | J. L. Crane | 2–3–1 | .417 | 4–4–1 | 9.2 | 10.2 |
| 8 (tie) | Alabama | Malcolm Griffin | 1–3–0 | .250 | 2–3–0 | 10.4 | 19.8 |
| 8 (tie) | Nashville | Charley Moran | 1–3–0 | .250 | 2–3–0 | 5.8 | 11.5 |
| 10 | Georgia | E. E. Jones | 1–4–0 | .200 | 2–4–0 | 4.7 | 26.5 |
| 11 | Tennessee | J. A. Pierce | 0–2–1 | .167 | 3–2–1 | 11.2 | 8.5 |
| 12 (tie) | Cumberland (TN) | E. D. Kuykendall | 0–1–0 | .000 | 0–1–0 | 0.0 | 18.0 |
| 12 (tie) | LSU | Edmond Chavanne | 0–1–0 | .000 | 2–2–0 | 21.3 | 8.8 |
| 12 (tie) | Kentucky State | W. H. Kiler | 0–2–0 | .000 | 4–6–0 | 5.9 | 6.3 |
| 12 (tie) | Ole Miss | Z. N. Estes | 0–3–0 | .000 | 0–3–0 | 1.7 | 10.0 |
| 12 (tie) | Georgia Tech | Harris T. Collier | 0–4–0 | .000 | 0–4–0 | 1.5 | 26.8 |

Key

PPG = Average of points scored per game
PAG = Average of points allowed per game

== Regular season ==
Index to colors and formatting
Non-conference matchup; SIAA member won
Non-conference matchup; SIAA member lost
Non-conference matchup; tie
Conference matchup

SIAA teams in bold.

=== Week One ===
| Date | Visiting team | Home team | Site | Result | Attendance | Reference |
|---|---|---|---|---|---|---|
| September 29 | **Kentucky State** | Cincinnati | Union Ball Park • Cincinnati, OH | **L** 6–20 | | |

=== Week Two ===
| Date | Visiting team | Home team | Site | Result | Attendance | Reference |
|---|---|---|---|---|---|---|
| October 6 | **Ole Miss** | **Vanderbilt** | Dudley Field • Nashville, TN | **VAN** 6–0 | | |
| October 6 | Louisville YMCA | **Kentucky State** | Lexington, KY | **W** 12–6 | | |
| October 6 | Deaf & Dumb Institute | **North Carolina** | Campus Athletic Field • Chapel Hill, NC | **W** 38–0 | | |
| October 10 | King | **Tennessee** | Baldwin Park • Knoxville, TN | **W** 22–0 | | |
| October 10 | Oklahoma | **Texas** | Varsity Athletic Field • Austin, TX | **W** 28–2 | | |

=== Week Three ===
| Date | Visiting team | Home team | Site | Result | Attendance | Reference |
|---|---|---|---|---|---|---|
| October 13 | **Georgia** | **Georgia Tech** | Piedmont Park • Atlanta, GA | **UGA** 12–0 | | |
| October 13 | **Vanderbilt** | **Texas** | Dallas Fair Grounds • Dallas, TX | **TEX** 22–0 | | |
| October 13 | Bethel (TN) | **Sewanee** | Hardee Field • Sewanee, TN | **W** 33–0 | | |
| October 13 | **Kentucky State** | Centre | Danville, KY | **L** 0–5 | | |
| October 17 | **Cumberland (TN)** | **Sewanee** | Hardee Field • Sewanee, TN | **SEW** 18–0 | | |

=== Week Four ===
| Date | Visiting team | Home team | Site | Result | Attendance | Reference |
|---|---|---|---|---|---|---|
| October 19 | Davidson | **Clemson** | Bowman Field • Calhoun, SC | **W** 64–0 | | |
| October 20 | Kentucky All-Stars | **Kentucky State** | Lexington, KY | **L** 0–5 | | |
| October 20 | South Carolina | **Georgia** | Herty Field • Athens GA | **W** 5–0 | | |
| October 20 | **Nashville** | **Georgia Tech** | Piedmont Park • Atlanta, GA | **NASH** 23–0 | | |
| October 21 | Taylor School | **Alabama** | The Quad • Tuscaloosa, AL | **W** 35–0 | | |
| October 22 | **Clemson** | Wofford | Spartanburg, SC | **W** 21–0 | | |
| October 22 | **Nashville** | **Auburn** | Drill Field • Auburn, AL | **AUB** 28–0 | | |
| October 22 | **Tennessee** | **Vanderbilt** | Dudley Field • Nashville, TN | **T** 0–0 | | |

=== Week Five ===
| Date | Visiting team | Home team | Site | Result | Attendance | Reference |
|---|---|---|---|---|---|---|
| October 26 | **Ole Miss** | Alabama | The Quad • Tuscaloosa, AL | **ALA** 12–5 | | |
| October 27 | **Sewanee** | Georgia | Atlanta, GA | **SEW** 21–6 | | |
| October 27 | Southern Athletic Club | Tulane | Tulane Athletic Field • New Orleans, LA | **W** 23–0 | | |
| October 27 | Central (KY) | Kentucky State | Lexington, KY | **L** 0–6 | | |
| October 27 | VPI | North Carolina | Campus Athletic Field • Chapel Hill, NC | **T** 0–0 | | |
| October 27 | Texas A&M | Texas | San Antonio Fairgrounds • San Antonio, TX | **W** 5–0 | | |
| October 27 | Centre | Vanderbilt | Dudley Field • Nashville, TN | **L** 0–11 | | |
| October 29 | **Sewanee** | Georgia Tech | Piedmont Park • Atlanta, GA | **SEW** 34–0 | | |

=== Week Six ===
| Date | Visiting team | Home team | Site | Result | Attendance | Reference |
|---|---|---|---|---|---|---|
| November 1 | Clemson | South Carolina | State Fairgrounds • Columbia, SC | **W** 51–0 | 5,000 | |
| November 1 | North Carolina | **Tennessee** | Baldwin Park • Knoxville, TN | **UNC** 22–5 | | |
| November 3 | Kentucky State | Louisville YMCA | Louisville, KY | **W** 12–0 | | |
| November 3 | North Carolina | **Vanderbilt** | Dudley Field • Nashville, TN | **UNC** 48–0 | | |
| November 3 | Tulane | **Alabama** | The Quad • Tuscaloosa, AL | **TUL** 6–0 | | |
| November 5 | North Carolina | **Sewanee** | Piedmont Park • Atlanta, GA | **T** 0–0 | | |

=== Week Seven ===
| Date | Visiting team | Home team | Site | Result | Attendance | Reference |
|---|---|---|---|---|---|---|
| November 10 | **Tennessee** | Auburn | Birmingham, AL | **AUB** 23–0 | | |
| November 10 | **Clemson** | Georgia | Herty Field • Athens, GA | **CLEM** 39–5 | | |
| November 10 | **Sewanee** | Nashville | Peabody Field • Nashville, TN | **SEW** 12–0 | | |
| November 10 | Millsaps | Tulane | Tulane Athletic Field • New Orleans, LA | **W** 35–0 | | |
| November 10 | Central (KY) | Vanderbilt | Dudley Field • Nashville, TN | **W** 27–0 | | |
| November 10 | Avondale AC | Kentucky State | Lexington, KY | **L** 5–11 | | |
| November 11 | Millsaps | LSU | State Field • Baton Rouge, LA | **W** 70–0 | | |

=== Week Eight ===
| Date | Visiting team | Home team | Site | Result | Attendance | Reference |
|---|---|---|---|---|---|---|
| November 17 | **Alabama** | Auburn | Riverside Park • Montgomery, AL | **AUB** 53–5 | | |
| November 17 | **Georgia** | North Carolina | State Fairgrounds • Raleigh, NC | **UNC** 55–0 | 800 | |
| November 17 | **LSU** | Tulane | Tulane Athletic Field • New Orleans, LA | **LSU** 29–0 | | |
| November 17 | **Sewanee** | Vanderbilt | Dudley Field • Nashville, TN | **SEW** 11–10 | | |
| November 17 | Georgetown (KY) | Kentucky State | Lexington, KY | **W** 12–0 | | |
| November 17 | Missouri | Texas | Varsity Athletic Field • Austin, TX | **W** 17–11 | | |

=== Week Nine ===
| Date | Visiting team | Home team | Site | Result | Attendance | Reference |
|---|---|---|---|---|---|---|
| November 24 | Bethel (TN) | **Vanderbilt** | Dudley Field • Nashville, TN | **W** 22–0 | | |
| November 24 | **Clemson** | VPI | Latta Park • Charlotte, NC | **W** 12–5 | | |
| November 24 | **Kentucky State** | Central (KY) | Richmond, KY | **L** 0–11 | | |
| November 24 | Kansas City Medical | **Texas** | Varsity Athletic Field • Austin, TX | **W** 30–0 | | |
| November 24 | **North Carolina** | Virginia | League Park • Norfolk, VA | **L** 0–17 | 6,000 | |
| November 27 | Grant | **Tennessee** | Baldwin Park • Knoxville, TN | **W** 28–0 | | |
| November 29 | **Auburn** | **Georgia** | Brisbane Park • Atlanta, GA | **AUB** 44–0 | | |
| November 29 | **Ole Miss** | **Tulane** | Tulane Athletic Field • New Orleans, LA | **TUL** 12–0 | | |
| November 29 | **Clemson** | **Alabama** | North Birmingham Park • Birmingham, AL | **CLEM** 35–0 | | |
| November 29 | Kentucky University | **Kentucky State** | Lexington, KY | **W** 12–0 | | |
| November 29 | **North Carolina** | Georgetown | Georgetown Field • Washington, D.C. | **T** 0–0 | 4,000 | |
| November 29 | Texas A&M | **Texas** | Varsity Athletic Field • Austin, TX | **W** 11–0 | | |
| November 29 | **Nashville** | **Vanderbilt** | Dudley Field • Nashville, TN | **VAN** 18–0 | | |
| November 29 | **Sewanee** | Virginia | Broad Street Park • Richmond, VA | **L** 5–17 | | |
| November 30 | **LSU** | Millsaps | Fairgrounds • Jackson, MS | **L** 5–6 | | |

=== Week Ten ===
| Date | Visiting team | Home team | Site | Result | Attendance | Reference |
|---|---|---|---|---|---|---|
| December 1 | Georgetown (KY) | **Tennessee** | Baldwin Park • Knoxville, TN | **W** 12–6 | | |
| December 5 | LSU Alumni | **LSU** | State Field • Baton Rouge, LA | **W** 10–0 | | |
| December 7 | Davidson | **Georgia Tech** | Augusta, GA | **L** 6–38 | 1,000 | |

== Awards and honors ==
=== All-Southerns ===
- E - Frank M. Osborne, North Carolina (O)
- T - Frank Bennett, North Carolina (O, WH)
- G - Big Sam, Texas (O)
- C - William Poole, Sewanee (O)
- HB - Henry Seibels, Sewanee (O)
- FB - Ormond Simkins, Sewanee (O, WH [as end])
