= H. T. Summersgill =

American baseball player (1876–1931)

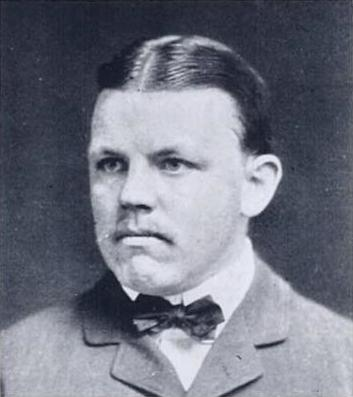
- Summersgill at Tulane in 1902

Biographical details
- Born: February 6, 1876; Brooklyn, New York, U.S.
- Died: June 16, 1931 (aged 55); Queens, New York, U.S.

Playing career
- 1896: Brown
- 1898–1899: Virginia
- Position: End

Coaching career (HC unless noted)

Football
- 1900–1901: Tulane

Baseball
- 1902: Tulane

Head coaching record
- Overall: 9–2^{*} (football); 8–5 (baseball) * Tulane records: 10–1

H. T. Summersgill (Andy Sommerville)
- Pitcher
- Batted: Unknown Threw: Unknown

MLB debut
- August 8, 1894, for the Brooklyn Grooms

Last MLB appearance
- August 8, 1894, for the Brooklyn Grooms

MLB statistics
- Win–loss record: 0-1
- Earned run average: 162.00
- Strikeouts: 0
- Stats at Baseball Reference

Teams
- Brooklyn Grooms (1894)

Andrew Henry Sommerville (born as Henry Travers Summersgill; February 6, 1876 – June 16, 1931) was a 19th-century Major League Baseball pitcher, physician and college football and baseball coach. As a pitcher he appeared in one game for the 1894 Brooklyn Grooms, giving up six runs in one-third of an inning while walking five batters. He served as the head football coach of Tulane University from 1900 to 1901 and the head baseball coach in 1902.

== College and coaching career ==
A native of Vermont, Summersgill originally attended Brown University, where he played on the football team in 1896, but transferred to the University of Virginia in 1898. He played football at Virginia as an end from 1898 to 1899, and was elected the team captain for the 1899 season. He was a member of Beta Theta Pi.

Summersgill then attended medical school at Tulane University. He took over as the part-time head football coach from H. T. "Pop" Collier for the 1900 season. In his first season, Tulane finished undefeated and unscored upon with a perfect 5–0 record, which was an impressive turnaround from a scoreless 0–6–1 campaign the year prior. The team outscored the Southern Athletic Club, Alabama, Millsaps, LSU, and Mississippi by a combined 105–;0 margin. The next year, Tulane finished 1901 with a 4–2 mark. Against the Mobile Y.M.C.A., Tulane lost, 2–0, despite Summersgill's protests to the officials that there was still time remaining in the game. The Olive and Blue later beat LSU, 22–0, on the field, but was forced to forfeit 11–0 by the Southern Intercollegiate Athletic Association over the use of a professional player. Today, Tulane records still count this as a win, which LSU records dispute.

Summersgill received a Doctor of Medicine degree from Tulane in 1900. In May 1901, he was licensed after passing the medical examination at Tulane. In 1902, Summersgill coached the Tulane baseball team and amassed an 8–5 record.

== Medical career ==
In 1905, he was the medical officer in charge at the Bohio Hospital in the Canal Zone at Bohio, Panama. He served as superintendent of the City Hospital in Cincinnati, and later, as the head of the University of California Hospital in San Francisco. After a ten-week illness, he died on June 16, 1931, of a cerebral hemorrhage at the Jamaica Hospital in Queens, New York.

== Head coaching record ==
=== Football ===
Year	Team	Overall	Conference	Standing	Bowl/playoffs
Tulane Olive and Blue (Southern Intercollegiate Athletic Association) (1900–1901)
1900	Tulane	5–0	3–0	T–2nd	
1901	Tulane	4–2	2–1	T–3rd	
Tulane:		9–2	5–1		
Total:		9–2			
