= List of Georgia Tech Yellow Jackets head football coaches =

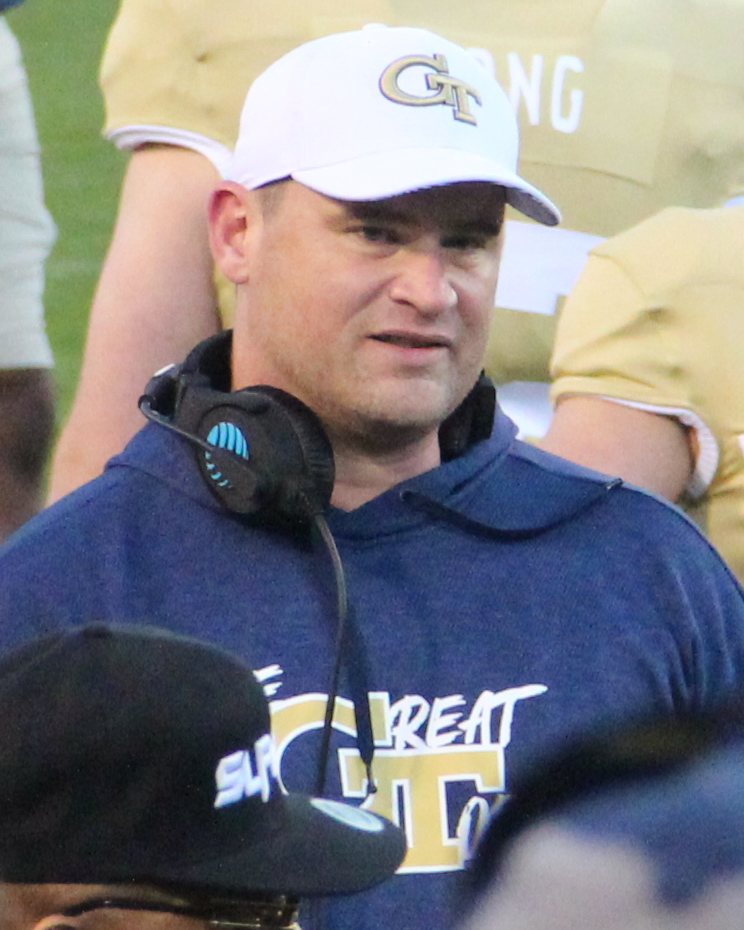
Brent Key, the current head coach for the Georgia Tech Yellow Jackets

The Georgia Tech Yellow Jackets college football team represents the Georgia Institute of Technology in the Atlantic Coast Conference. The Yellow Jackets compete in the National Collegiate Athletic Association (NCAA) Division I Football Bowl Subdivision. The school has had 23 official head coaches since first fielding a team in 1892, including four who have been inducted into the College Football Hall of Fame: John Heisman, William Alexander, Bobby Dodd, and Paul Johnson. Brent Key is the current head coach of the program, taking over the role midway through the 2022 season following the dismissal of Geoff Collins.

Georgia Tech has played in over 1,300 football games across 131 seasons. During that time, four head coaches have won a national championship: Heisman (1917), Alexander (1928), Dodd (1952), and Bobby Ross (1990). Six coaches (Heisman, Alexander, Dodd, Ross, George O'Leary, and Johnson (Note: Johnson's conference championship was later vacated by the NCAA.)) have won conference championships and twelve different coaches have led Georgia Tech in a post-season bowl game.

Alexander holds the Georgia Tech record for the longest coaching tenure (25 seasons), most games coached (244), most losses (95), and most ties (15). Heisman has the highest winning percentage, (.759), among Georgia Tech coaches who coached at least ten games. Dodd holds the Georgia Tech record for most wins (165).

== Key ==
Key to symbols in coaches list
| General | | Overall | | Conference | | Postseason (Note: Although the first Rose Bowl Game was played in 1902, it has been continuously played since the 1916 game, and is recognized as the oldest bowl game by the NCAA. "—" indicates any season prior to 1916 when postseason games were not played.) | |
|---|---|---|---|---|---|---|---|
| No. | Order of coaches (Note: A running total of the number of head coaches, with coaches who served separate tenures being counted only once. Interim head coaches are represented with "Int" and are not counted in the running total. "—" indicates the team played but either without a coach or no coach is on record. "X" indicates an interim year without play.) | GC | Games coached | CW | Conference wins | PW | Postseason wins |
| DC | Division championships | OW | Overall wins | CL | Conference losses | PL | Postseason losses |
| CC | Conference championships | OL | Overall losses | CT | Conference ties | PT | Postseason ties |
| NC | National championships | OT | Overall ties (Note: Overtime rules in college football were introduced in 1996, making ties impossible in the period since.) | C% | Conference winning percentage | | |
| † | Elected to the College Football Hall of Fame | O% | Overall winning percentage (Note: When computing the win–loss percentage, a tie counts as half a win and half a loss.) | | | | |

== Coaches ==
List of head football coaches showing season(s) coached, overall records, conference records, postseason records, championships and selected awards (Note: Statistics correct as of the end of the 2023 college football season.)
| No. | Name | Term | GC | OW | OL | OT | O% | CW | CL | CT | C% | PW | PL | PT | DC (Note: Divisional champions have advanced to the ACC Championship Game since the institution of divisional play beginning in the 2005 season. Since that time, Georgia Tech has competed in the ACC Coastal Division. Divisional play was not used in the 2020 season due to schedule disruptions caused by the COVID-19 pandemic. The divisional format was permanently discontinued starting with the 2023 season.) | CC | NC | Awards |
|---|---|---|---|---|---|---|---|---|---|---|---|---|---|---|---|---|---|---|
| 1 | Ernest West | 1892 | 3 | 0 | 3 | 0 | .000 | — | — | — | — | — | — | — | — | — | 0 | — |
| 2 | Leonard Wood (Note: Frank Spain is erroneously listed as co-head coach for the 1893 season in the Georgia Tech media guide. Spain was the team's center and helped raise money for the team.) | 1893 | 3 | 2 | 1 | 1 | 0.625 | — | — | — | — | — | — | — | — | — | 0 | — |
| 3 | Dutch Dorsey (Note: Leonard Wood and Frank Spain are erroneously listed as co-head coaches by the Georgia Tech media guide, though neither of them were still part of the team. Spain had resigned as a teacher at Georgia Tech earlier in the year to pursue acting. Rufus "Dutch" Dorsey was the coach.) | 1894 | 3 | 0 | 3 | 0 | .000 | — | — | — | — | — | — | — | — | — | 0 | — |
| — | No team | 1895 | — | — | — | — | — | — | — | — | — | — | — | — | — | — | — | — |
| 4 | J. B. Wood (Note: The Georgia Tech information guide erroneously lists no coach for the 1896-1897 seasons and Cow Nalley for the 1898 season, though math professor, J. B. Wood, coached the team.) | 1896–1898 | 11 (Note: Includes two wins and two losses erroneously left out of the Georgia Tech information guide.) | 3 | 7 | 1 | 0.318 | — | — | — | — | — | — | — | — | — | 0 | — |
| 5 | Cow Nalley (Note: Harris Collier is erroneously listed as the head coach by the Georgia Tech media guide, but he was coaching at Tulane in 1899. Cow Nalley was coach.) | 1899 | 5 | 0 | 5 | 0 | .000 | — | — | — | — | — | — | — | — | — | 0 | — |
| 6 | Harris Collier (Note: The Georgia Tech media guide erroneously lists no coach for 1900, but Collier coached the team.) | 1900 | 4 | 0 | 4 | 0 | .000 | — | — | — | — | — | — | — | — | — | 0 | — |
| 7 | John McKee (Note: The Georgia Tech media guide erroneously lists Cyrus W. Strickler as the coach in 1901, but there is no record that he was ever involved with the team. McKee was the coach.) | 1901 | 5 | 4 | 0 | 1 | 0.900 | — | — | — | — | — | — | — | — | — | 0 | — |
| 8 | George Andree (Note: The Georgia Tech media guide erroneously lists McKee as the coach in 1902, but Andree has a picture and long bio as the Tech coach in the newspaper.) | 1902 | 8 | 0 | 6 | 2 | 0.125 | — | — | — | — | — | — | — | — | — | 0 | — |
| 9 | Oliver Huie (Note: The Georgia Tech media guide erroneously lists McKee as the coach in 1903, but Huie is named as Tech coach in the newspaper.) | 1903 | 8 | 3 | 5 | 0 | 0.375 | — | — | — | — | — | — | — | — | — | 0 | — |
| 10 | John Heisman^{†} | 1904–1919 | 138 | 102 | 29 | 7 | 0.764 | — | — | — | — | — | — | — | — | 3 (Note: According to the 2023 Georgia Tech Football Information Guide, Georgia Tech was a member of the Southern Intercollegiate Athletic Association from the 1916 season to the 1921 season. The guide does not give a breakdown for conference results, but does claim that Georgia Tech was the conference champion five times, three times under Heisman and two times under Alexander.) | 1 (1917) | — |
| 11 | William Alexander^{†} | 1920–1944 | 244 | 134 | 95 | 15 | 0.580 | 74 | 54 | 15 | 0.570 | 3 | 2 | 0 | — | 8 | 1 (1928) | SEC Coach of the Year (1939); AFCA Coach of the Year (1942) |
| 12 | Bobby Dodd^{†} | 1945–1966 | 237 | 165 | 64 | 8 | 0.713 | 82 | 39 | 4 | 0.672 | 9 | 4 | 0 | — | 2 | 1 (1952) | SEC Coach of the Year (1951) |
| 13 | Bud Carson | 1967–1971 | 54 | 27 | 27 | 0 | 0.500 | — | — | — | — | 1 | 1 | 0 | — | — | 0 | — |
| 14 | Bill Fulcher | 1972–1973 | 23 | 12 | 10 | 1 | 0.543 | — | — | — | — | 1 | 0 | 0 | — | — | 0 | — |
| 15 | Pepper Rodgers | 1974–1979 | 67 | 34 | 31 | 2 | 0.522 | — | — | — | — | 0 | 1 | 0 | — | — | 0 | — |
| 16 | Bill Curry | 1980–1986 | 78 | 31 | 43 | 4 | 0.423 | 13 | 8 | 1 | 0.614 | 1 | 0 | 0 | — | 0 | 0 | ACC Coach of the Year (1985) |
| 17 | Bobby Ross | 1987–1991 | 58 | 31 | 26 | 1 | 0.543 | 15 | 18 | 1 | 0.456 | 2 | 0 | 0 | — | 1 | 1 (1990) | ACC Coach of the Year (1990); AFCA Coach of the Year (1990); Bobby Dodd Coach of the Year (1990); FWAA Coach of the Year (1990); Paul "Bear" Bryant Award (1990); Sporting News College Football Coach of the Year (1990); Walter Camp Coach of the Year (1990); Woody Hayes Trophy (1990) |
| 18 | Bill Lewis (Note: Lewis resigned on November 7, 1994, and the final three games of the season were coached by George O'Leary) | 1992–1994 | 30 | 11 | 19 | 0 | 0.367 | 7 | 15 | 0 | 0.318 | 0 | 0 | 0 | — | 0 | 0 | — |
| 19 | George O'Leary (Note: O'Leary was named as interim head coach for the final three games of the 1994 season following Lewis' dismissal. O'Leary resigned prior to the 2001 bowl game after being named as head coach at Notre Dame) | 1994–2001 | 85 | 52 | 33 | 0 | 0.612 | 36 | 23 | 0 | 0.610 | 2 | 2 | 0 | — | 1 | 0 | ACC Coach of the Year (1998, 2000); Bobby Dodd Coach of the Year (2000) |
| — | Mac McWhorter (Note: McWhorter was named interim head coach for the final game of the 2001 season after O'Leary accepted the head coach position at Notre Dame.) | 2001 | 1 | 1 | 0 | — | 1.000 | 0 | 0 | — | — | 1 | 0 | — | — | 0 | 0 | — |
| 20 | Chan Gailey (Note: Gailey was dismissed as head coach on November 26, 2007, and Tenuta was named as interim head coach for the final game of the 2007 season.) | 2002–2007 | 76 | 44 | 32 | — | 0.579 | 28 | 20 | — | 0.583 | 2 | 3 | — | 1 | 0 | 0 | — |
| — | Jon Tenuta (Note: Tenuta was named as the interim head coach for the final game of the 2007 season following Gailey's dismissal.) | 2007 | 1 | 0 | 1 | — | .000 | 0 | 0 | — | — | 0 | 1 | — | 0 | 0 | 0 | — |
| 21 | Paul Johnson^{†} | 2008–2018 | 142 | 82 | 60 | — | 0.577 | 51 | 37 | — | 0.580 | 3 | 6 | — | 3 | 1 (Note: Johnson's conference championship was later vacated by the NCAA.) | 0 | ACC Coach of the Year (2008, 2009, 2014) |
| 22 | Geoff Collins (Note: Collins was dismissed on September 26, 2022, and Key was named as interim head coach for the final eight games of the 2022 season.) | 2019–2022 | 38 | 10 | 28 | — | 0.263 | 7 | 19 | — | 0.269 | 0 | 0 | — | 0 | 0 | 0 | — |
| 23 | Brent Key (Note: Key was named as interim head coach for the final eight games of the 2022 season following Collins' dismissal.) | 2022–present | 47 | 27 | 20 | — | 0.574 | 20 | 11 | — | 0.645 | 1 | 2 | — | 0 | 0 | 0 | — |

== Sources ==
=== General ===
- 2022 Georgia Tech Football Information Guide. Georgia Tech Athletics. 2022.
- 2023 Georgia Tech Football Information Guide (PDF). Georgia Tech Athletics. 2023.

=== Specific ===
- "Werner Ladder AFCA FBS Coach of the Year". American Football Coaches Association. Archived from the original on December 1, 2021.
- Aubrey, Josh (January 12, 2023) [January 11, 2023]. "Former GS coach Paul Johnson named to College Football Hall of Fame". Statesboro Herald. Archived from the original on January 14, 2023.
- "Previous Winners". Bobby Dodd Coach of the Year Award. Archived from the original on July 8, 2022.
- Bradley, Ken (December 16, 2014). "Sporting News all-time Coaches of the Year". Sporting News. Archived from the original on September 27, 2022.
- Caudell, Jackson (September 26, 2022). "Georgia Tech Offensive Line Coach Brent Key Will Be the Interim Head Coach". Sports Illustrated. Archived from the original on September 27, 2022.
- "Eddie Robinson Coach of the Year Award". Football Writers Association of America. Archived from the original on September 27, 2022.
- Hale, David M. (June 28, 2022). "ACC latest to drop divisions, starting in 2023". ESPN.com. Archived from the original on July 13, 2022.
- Newton, Matt (May 9, 2022). "Reports: ACC Considering Elimination of Divisions". Sports Illustrated. Archived from the original on June 12, 2022.
- "Coach of the Year Award". Paul "Bear" Bryant Awards. June 11, 2021. Archived from the original on September 27, 2022.
- "Touchdown Club of Columbus". Touchdown Club of Columbus.
- "The Walter Camp Coach of the Year". Walter Camp Football Foundation. December 30, 2021. Archived from the original on July 30, 2022.
- "The Georgia Tech Alumnus, Vol. XII, No. 2". Georgia Tech Alumni Magazine.
- "The Georgia Tech Alumnus, Vol. 49, No. 3". Georgia Tech Alumni Magazine.
