= List of Vanderbilt Commodores head football coaches =

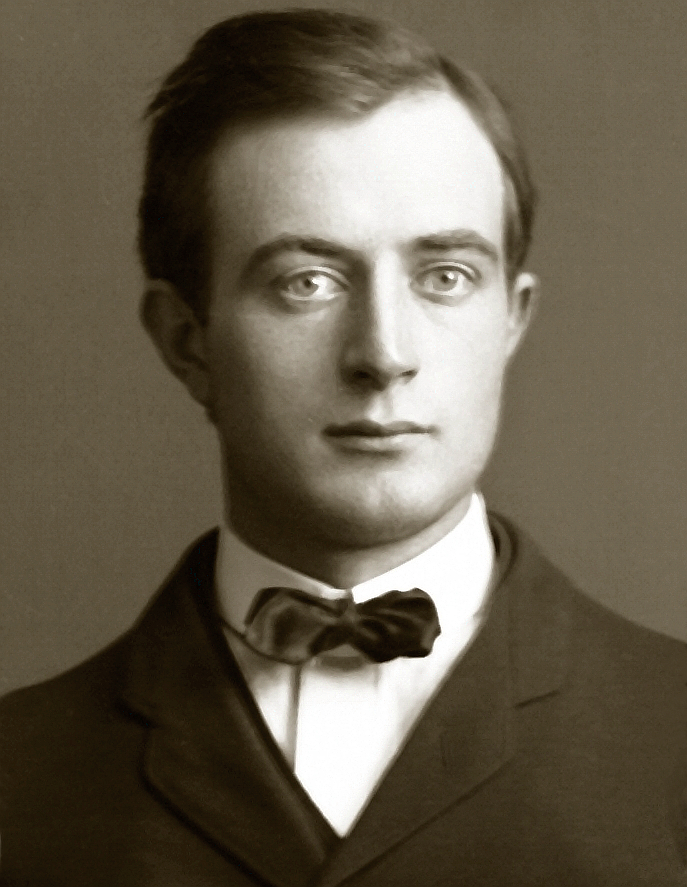
Dan McGugin has the most wins as Commodores' head coach with 198.

The Vanderbilt Commodores college football team represents Vanderbilt University in the East Division of the Southeastern Conference (SEC). The Commodores compete as part of the National Collegiate Athletic Association (NCAA) Division I Football Bowl Subdivision. The program has had 29 head coaches since it began play during the 1890 season. Since December 14, 2020, Clark Lea has served as head coach of the Commodores.

The team has played 1,300 games over 135 seasons of Vanderbilt football. In that time, seven coaches have led the Commodores to postseason bowl games: Art Guepe, Steve Sloan, George MacIntyre, Bobby Johnson, James Franklin, Derek Mason, and Lea. Four other coaches won conference championships: R. G. Acton, Walter H. Watkins, James R. Henry and Dan McGugin. Between them, the coaches won eleven Southern Intercollegiate Athletic Association championships; McGugin led the team to an additional two titles as a member of the Southern Conference.

McGugin is the leader in seasons coached and games won, with 198 victories during his 30 years at Vanderbilt. E. H. Alley has the highest winning percentage with 1.000. Robbie Caldwell has the lowest winning percentage with .167. Of the 28 different head coaches who have led the Commodores, McGugin, Ray Morrison, Red Sanders, and Bill Edwards have been inducted into the College Football Hall of Fame in South Bend, Indiana.

== Key ==
Key to symbols in coaches list
General		Overall		Conference		Postseason (Note: Although the first Rose Bowl Game was played in 1902, it has been continuously played since the 1916 game, and is recognized as the oldest bowl game by the NCAA. "—" indicates any season prior to 1916 when postseason games were not played.)	
No.	Order of coaches (Note: A running total of the number of head coaches, with coaches who served separate tenures being counted only once. Interim head coaches are represented with "Int" and are not counted in the running total. "—" indicates the team played but either without a coach or no coach is on record. "X" indicates an interim year without play.)	GC	Games coached	CW	Conference wins	PW	Postseason wins
DC	Division championships	OW	Overall wins	CL	Conference losses	PL	Postseason losses
CC	Conference championships	OL	Overall losses	CT	Conference ties	PT	Postseason ties
NC	National championships	OT	Overall ties (Note: Overtime rules in college football were introduced in 1996, making ties impossible in the period since.)	C%	Conference winning percentage		
†	Elected to the College Football Hall of Fame	O%	Overall winning percentage (Note: When computing the win–loss percentage, a tie counts as half a win and half a loss.)				

== Coaches ==
List of head football coaches showing season(s) coached, overall records, conference records, postseason records, championships and selected awards (Note: Statistics correct as of the end of the 2025 NCAA Division I FBS football season.)
No.	Name	Term	Season(s)	GC	OW	OL	OT	O%	CW	CL	CT	C%	PW	PL	PT	DC (Note: Divisional champions have advanced to the SEC Championship Game since the institution of divisional play beginning in the 1992 season. Since that time, Vanderbilt has competed as a member of the East Division of the SEC.)	CC	NC	Awards
1	Elliott Jones	1890–1892	3	13	8	5	0	0.615	—	—	—	—	—	—	—	—	0	0	—
2	W. J. Keller	1893	1	7	6	1	0	0.857	—	—	—	—	—	—	—	—	0	0	—
3	Henry Worth Thornton	1894	1	8	7	1	0	0.875	2	0	0	1.000	—	—	—	—	0	0	—
4	Charles L. Upton	1895	1	9	5	3	1	0.611	3	1	0	0.750	—	—	—	—	0	0	—
5	R. G. Acton	1896–1898	3	20	10	7	3	0.575	5	2	0	0.714	—	—	—	—	1	0	—
6	James L. Crane	1899–1900	2	18	11	6	1	0.639	6	3	1	0.650	—	—	—	—	0	0	—
7	Walter H. Watkins	1901–1902	2	17	14	2	1	0.853	8	1	1	0.850	—	—	—	—	1	0	—
8	James R. Henry	1903	1	8	6	1	1	0.813	5	1	1	0.786	—	—	—	—	1	0	—
9	Dan McGugin^{†}	1904–1917; 1919–1934	14, 16	272	198	55	19	0.763	104	34	13	0.732	0	0	0	—	11	0	—
10	Ray Morrison^{†}	1918; 1935–1939	1, 5	53	29	22	2	0.566	18	15	1	0.544	0	0	0	—	0	0	SEC Coach of the Year (1937)
11	Red Sanders^{†}	1940–1942; 1946–1948	3, 3	60	36	22	2	0.617	15	20	2	0.432	0	0	0	—	0	0	SEC Coach of the Year (1941)
12	E. H. Alley	1943	1	5	5	0	0	1.000	0	0	0	.000	0	0	0	—	0	0	—
13	Doby Bartling	1944–1945	2	13	6	6	1	0.500	2	4	0	0.333	0	0	0	—	0	0	—
14	Bill Edwards^{†}	1949–1952	4	42	21	19	2	0.524	11	17	1	0.397	0	0	0	—	0	0	—
15	Art Guepe	1953–1962	10	100	39	54	7	0.425	19	43	6	0.324	1	0	0	—	0	0	SEC Coach of the Year (1955)
16	John Green	1963–1966	4	40	7	29	4	0.225	2	20	3	0.140	0	0	0	—	0	0	—
17	Bill Pace	1967–1972	6	63	22	38	3	0.373	6	28	1	0.186	0	0	0	—	0	0	—
18	Steve Sloan	1973–1974	2	23	12	9	2	0.565	3	8	1	0.292	0	0	1	—	0	0	—
19	Fred Pancoast	1975–1978	4	44	13	31	0	0.295	2	22	0	0.083	0	0	0	—	0	0	—
20	George MacIntyre	1979–1985	7	78	25	52	1	0.327	8	33	1	0.202	0	1	0	—	0	0	UPI SEC Coach of the Year (1982); SEC Coach of the Year (1982)
21	Watson Brown	1986–1990	5	55	10	45	0	0.182	4	29	0	0.121	0	0	0	—	0	0	—
22	Gerry DiNardo	1991–1994	4	44	19	25	0	0.432	9	22	0	0.290	0	0	0	0	0	0	—
23	Rod Dowhower	1995–1996	2	22	4	18	0	0.182	1	15	0	0.063	0	0	0	0	0	0	—
24	Woody Widenhofer	1997–2001	5	55	15	40	—	0.273	4	36	—	0.100	0	0	—	0	0	0	—
25	Bobby Johnson	2002–2009	8	95	29	66	—	0.305	12	52	—	0.188	1	0	—	0	0	0	SEC Coach of the Year (2008)
26	Robbie Caldwell	2010	1	12	2	10	—	0.167	1	7	—	0.125	0	0	—	0	0	0	—
27	James Franklin	2011–2013	3	39	24	15	—	0.615	11	13	—	0.458	2	1	—	0	0	0	—
28	Derek Mason	2014–2020	7	74	27	55	—	0.329	10	38	—	0.179	0	0	—	0	0	0	—
29	Clark Lea	2021–present	5	62	26	36	—	0.419	11	29	—	0.275	1	1	—	0	0	0	SEC Coach of the Year (2024)
