= 1900 Clemson Tigers football team =

American college football season

1900 Clemson Tigers football
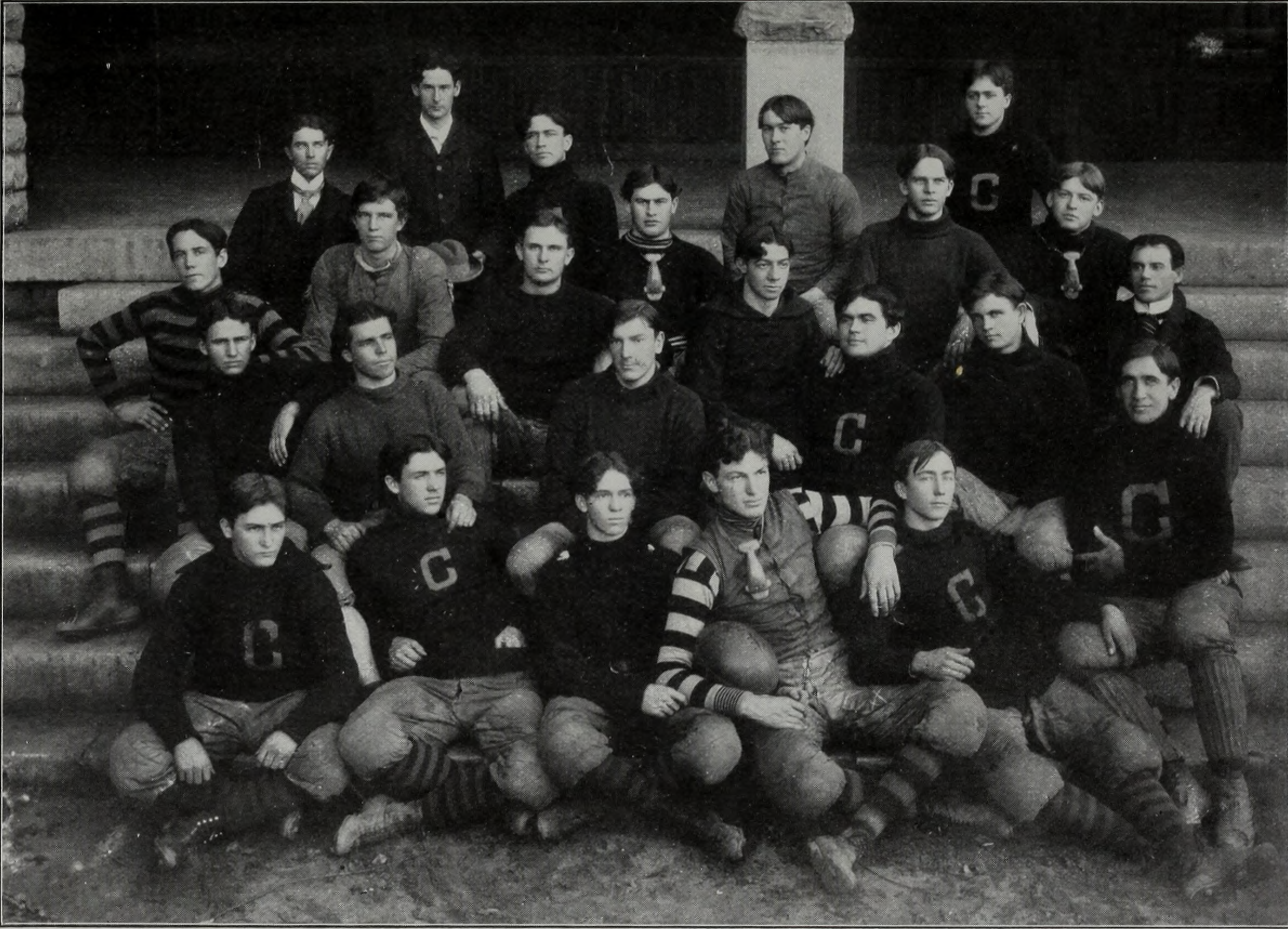

SIAA champion
- Conference: Southern Intercollegiate Athletic Association
- Record: 6–0 (3–0 SIAA)
- Head coach: John Heisman (1st season)
- Captain: Norman Walker

1900 Southern Intercollegiate Athletic Association football standings
	Conf.					Overall
Team	W		L		T	W		L		T
Clemson +	2	–	0	–	0	6	–	0	–	0
Auburn	4	–	0	–	0	4	–	0	–	0
Tulane	3	–	0	–	0	5	–	0	–	0
Texas	1	–	0	–	0	6	–	0	–	0
Sewanee +	5	–	0	–	1	6	–	1	–	1
North Carolina	3	–	0	–	1	4	–	1	–	3
Vanderbilt	2	–	3	–	1	4	–	4	–	1
Alabama	1	–	3	–	0	2	–	3	–	0
Nashville	1	–	3	–	0	2	–	3	–	0
Georgia	1	–	4	–	0	2	–	4	–	0
Tennessee	0	–	2	–	1	3	–	2	–	1
Cumberland (TN)	0	–	1	–	0	0	–	1	–	0
LSU	0	–	1	–	0	2	–	2	–	0
Kentucky State	0	–	2	–	0	4	–	6	–	0
Ole Miss	0	–	3	–	0	0	–	3	–	0
Georgia Tech	0	–	3	–	0	0	–	4	–	0
$ – Conference champion

The 1900 Clemson Tigers football team represented Clemson Agricultural College—now known as Clemson University–during the 1900 Southern Intercollegiate Athletic Association football season. Under first year head coach John Heisman, the team posted a 6–0 record and Southern Intercollegiate Athletic Association (SIAA) championship.

The Tigers outscored their opponents 222–10; the 64–0 win over Davidson on opening day was then the largest score ever made in the South and the season's only home game. The only close game was with the South Atlantic school VPI.

== Before the season ==
Walter Riggs led the effort to raise the $415.11 to hire Auburn's football coach John Heisman, the first Clemson coach who had experience coaching at another school. As Riggs recalled, "By 1899 the Clemson football team had risen steadily until its material was equal to that of any southern college, and the time had come to put on the long-planned finishing touch." Heisman once described his style of play at Clemson as "radically different from anything on earth".

The team took the field in jerseys and stockings bearing distinctive orange and purple stripes. Norman Walker was team captain.

== Schedule ==
Date	Opponent	Site	Result	Attendance	Source
October 19	Davidson*	Calhoun, SC	W 64–0		
October 22	at Wofford*	Spartanburg, SC	W 21–0		
November 1	at South Carolina*	State Fairgrounds; Columbia, SC (Big Thursday)	W 51–0	5,000	
November 10	at Georgia	Herty Field; Athens, GA (rivalry)	W 39–5		
November 24	vs. VPI*	Latta Park; Charlotte, NC	W 12–5		
November 29	at Alabama	North Birmingham Park; Birmingham, AL (rivalry)	W 35–0		
*Non-conference game

== Game summaries ==
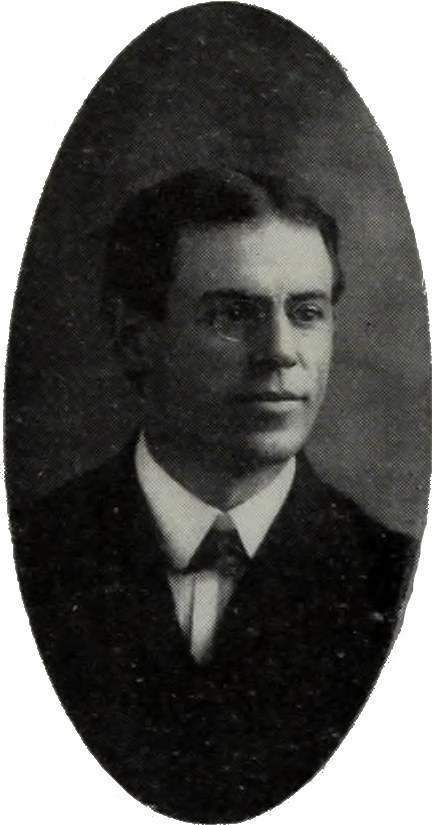
Heisman

=== Davidson ===
Clemson opened the season at home in Calhoun on October 19, winning over Davidson 64–0, then the largest score ever made in the South.

=== Wofford ===
The Tigers beat Wofford 21–0 on October 22. Clemson agreed that every point scored after the first four touchdowns would not count.

=== South Carolina ===
Going into the South Carolina game, Clemson had been strong on offense, but weak on defense. Kinsler and Douthit were both injured. The Tigers rolled up a 51–0 score on South Carolina.

=== Georgia ===
Clemson at Georgia

Team	1	2	Total
• Clemson	11	28	39
Georgia	5	0	5

- Date: November 10
- Location: Herty Field
  Athens, GA
- Referee: Henry Thornton (Atlanta)

Before the game with Georgia, students in the dorms barraged Clemson players with bits of coal. Clemson went on to beat the Bulldogs for the first time, pulling away in the second half to overwhelm the Bulldogs 39–5, and achieve the season's first great victory.

The starting lineup was Bellows (left end), Dickerson (left tackle), George (left guard) Kinsley (center), Woodward (right guard), Walker (right tackle), Lynah (right end), Lewis (quarterback), Forsyth (left halfback), Hunt (right halfback), Douthit (fullback).

=== V. P. I. ===
Clemson vs. VPI

Team	1	2	Total
• Clemson	6	6	12
VPI	5	0	5

- Date: November 24
- Location:
  Charlotte, NC

In Charlotte, Clemson beat VPI 12–5 in the first-ever meeting between the two schools. The game was shortened due to darkness. Hunter Carpenter starred for VPI.

=== Alabama ===
Clemson at Alabama

Team	1	2	Total
• Clemson	23	12	35
Alabama	0	0	0

- Date: November 29
- Location: North Birmingham Park
  Birmingham, AL

The season closed on Thanksgiving against the Alabama Crimson White, Clemson's first meeting with Alabama, at Birmingham's North Birmingham Park. The Tigers won 35–0. Clemson back Claude Douthit scored four touchdowns.

After the Tigers forced an Alabama punt to open the game, Douthit scored three consecutive touchdowns for Clemson en route to an 18–0 lead. Douthit scored first on a 5-yard run, next on a short reception and finally on a second short touchdown run. Buster Hunter then scored for Clemson on a long run just before the break and made the halftime score 23–0. In the second half, the Tigers extended their lead to 35–0 behind a long Jim Lynah touchdown run and Douthit's fourth score of the day on a short run. With approximately four minutes left in the game, both team captains agreed to end the game early due to an unruly crowd and impending darkness.

== Postseason ==
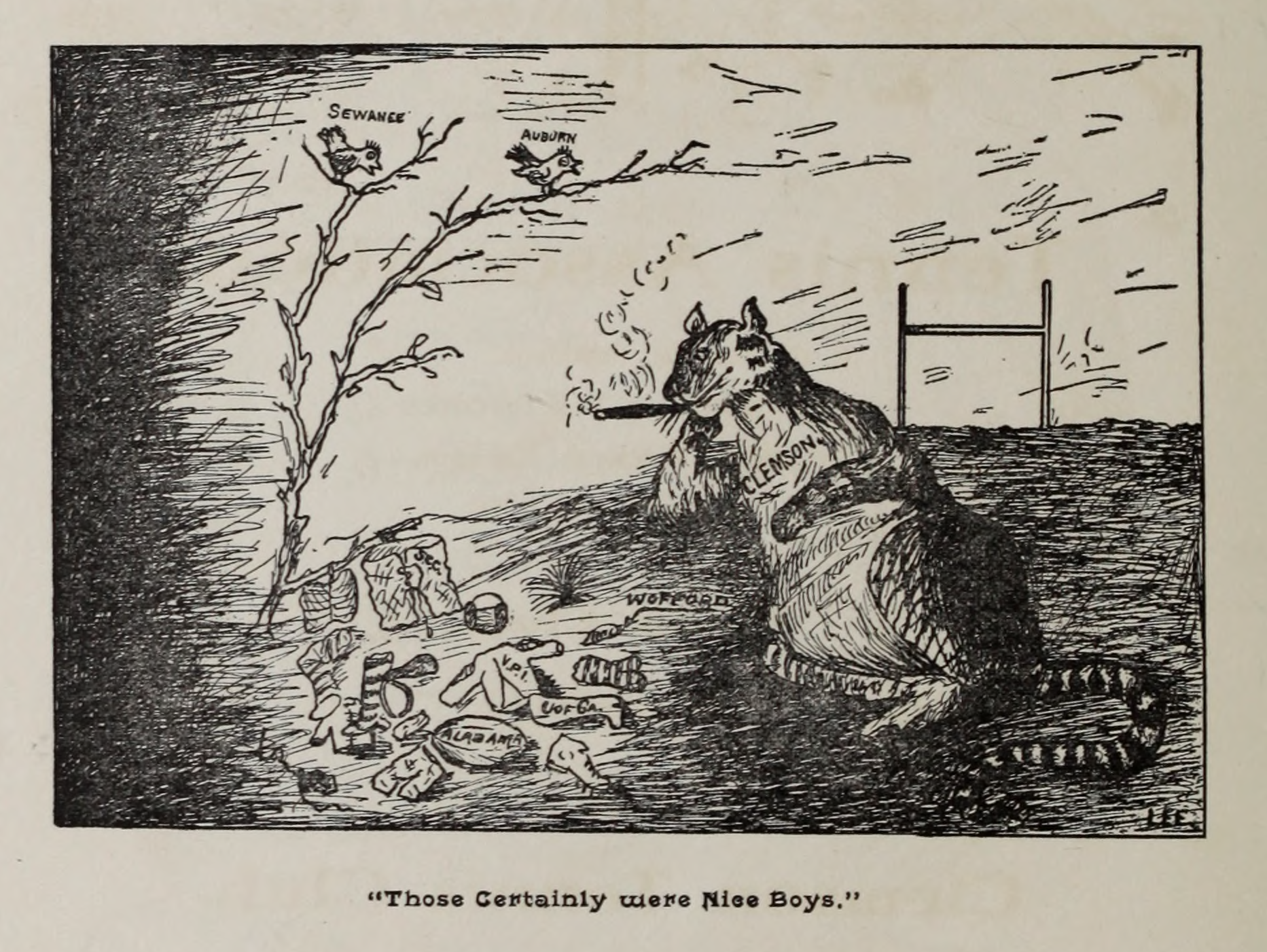

The Tigers ended the season with the outright SIAA title. It was both Clemson and Heisman's first conference championship and undefeated, untied season. (Note: Clemson did not go undefeated and untied again until 1948.) The season saw "the rise of Clemson from a little school whose football teams had never been heard of before, to become a football machine of the very first power."

== Players ==
=== Depth chart ===
The following chart provides a visual depiction of Clemson's lineup during the 1900 season. The chart mimics the offense in a T formation.

LE
C. A. Bellows

LT	LG	C	RG	RT
Joe Duckworth	A. P. George	John H. Kinsler	Jack Woodward	Norman Walker
Beef DeCosta			J. B. Lewis	L. O. King

RE
Jim Lynah

QB
Gus P. Lewis

LHB	FB	RHB
W. C. Forsythe	Pug Douthit	Buster Hunter
Fred Pearman		J. G. Kaigler

-

=== Line ===
Player	Position	Games started	Hometown	Prep school	Height	Weight	Age
C. A. Bellows	left end		Beaufort, South Carolina				
Joe Duckworth	left tackle		Anderson, South Carolina				
P. A. George	right guard		Latta, South Carolina				
John H. Kinsler	center		Columbia, South Carolina				23
Jim Lynah	right end		Savannah, Georgia				
J. Norman Walker	right tackle		Appleton, South Carolina				20
Jack Woodward	left guard						

=== Backfield ===
Player	Position	Games started	Hometown	Prep school	Height	Weight	Age
Claude "Pug" Douthit	fullback		Anderson, South Carolina				21
W. C. Forsythe	left halfback		Brevard, North Carolina				
Buster Hunter	right halfback		Pendleton, South Carolina				19
Gus P. Lewis	quarterback						20

=== Substitutes ===
Player	Position	Hometown	Prep school	Height	Weight	Age
J. W. Bleose
Beef DeCosta	tackle					
J. G. Kaigler	halfback	Lexington, South Carolina				
L. O. King	tackle					
J. B. Lewis	tackle					
Fred Pearman	halfback					

== Books ==
- Blackman, Sam (2001). Clemson: Where the Tigers Play. ISBN 9781582613697.
- Blackman, Sam (2016). If These Walls Could Talk. Triumph Books. ISBN 9781633196896 – via Google Books.
- Riley, Helene M. (2002). Clemson University. ISBN 9780738514703.
- Woodruff, Fuzzy (1928). A History of Southern Football 1890–1928. Vol. 1.
