= Malcolm Griffin =

Malcolm Griffin may refer to:

- Malcolm Griffin (American football) (1877–1948), American college football player and coach
- Malcolm Griffin (basketball) (born 1991), American professional basketball player
