= 1900 Kentucky State College Blue and White football team =

American college football season

1900 Kentucky State College Blue and White football
- Conference: Southern Intercollegiate Athletic Association
- Record: 4–6 (0–2 SIAA)
- Head coach: William H. Kiler (1st season)
- Captain: Wellington Scot

1900 Southern Intercollegiate Athletic Association football standings
	Conf.					Overall
Team	W		L		T	W		L		T
Clemson +	2	–	0	–	0	6	–	0	–	0
Auburn	4	–	0	–	0	4	–	0	–	0
Tulane	3	–	0	–	0	5	–	0	–	0
Texas	1	–	0	–	0	6	–	0	–	0
Sewanee +	5	–	0	–	1	6	–	1	–	1
North Carolina	3	–	0	–	1	4	–	1	–	3
Vanderbilt	2	–	3	–	1	4	–	4	–	1
Alabama	1	–	3	–	0	2	–	3	–	0
Nashville	1	–	3	–	0	2	–	3	–	0
Georgia	1	–	4	–	0	2	–	4	–	0
Tennessee	0	–	2	–	1	3	–	2	–	1
Cumberland (TN)	0	–	1	–	0	0	–	1	–	0
LSU	0	–	1	–	0	2	–	2	–	0
Kentucky State	0	–	2	–	0	4	–	6	–	0
Ole Miss	0	–	3	–	0	0	–	3	–	0
Georgia Tech	0	–	3	–	0	0	–	4	–	0
$ – Conference champion

The 1900 Kentucky State College Blue and White football team represented Kentucky State College—now known as the University of Kentucky—as a member of the Southern Intercollegiate Athletic Association (SIAA) during the 1900 college football season. Led by first-year head coach William H. Kiler, the Blue and White compiled an overall record of 4–6 with a mark of 0–2 in SIAA play

== Schedule ==
Date	Opponent	Site	Result	Source
September 29	at Cincinnati	Union Ball Park; Cincinnati, OH	L 6–20	
October 6	Louisville YMCA	Lexington, KY	W 12–6	
October 13	at Centre	Danville, KY (rivalry)	L 0–5	
October 20	Kentucky All Stars	Lexington, KY	L 0–5	
October 27	Central (KY)	Lexington, KY	L 0–6	
November 3	at Louisville YMCA	Louisville, KY	W 12–0	
November 10	Avondale AC	Lexington, KY	L 5–11	
November 17	Georgetown (KY)	Lexington, KY	W 12–0	
November 24	at Central (KY)	Richmond, KY	L 0–11	
November 29	Kentucky University	Lexington, KY	W 12–0	
