= 1900 Auburn Tigers football team =

American college football season

1900 Auburn Tigers football
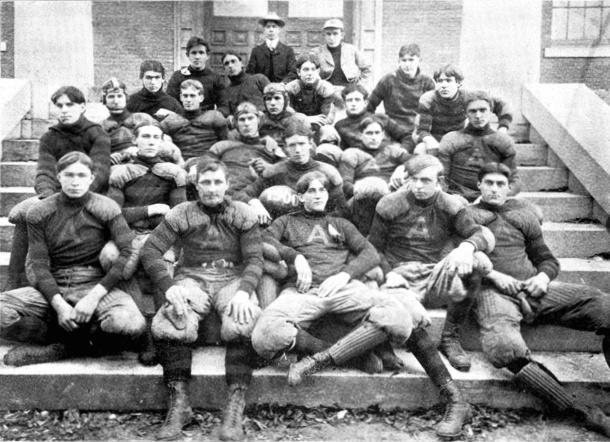
- Conference: Southern Intercollegiate Athletic Association
- Record: 4–0 (4–0 SIAA)
- Head coach: Walter H. Watkins (1st season)
- Captain: Daniel S. Martin

1900 Southern Intercollegiate Athletic Association football standings
	Conf.					Overall
Team	W		L		T	W		L		T
Clemson +	2	–	0	–	0	6	–	0	–	0
Auburn	4	–	0	–	0	4	–	0	–	0
Tulane	3	–	0	–	0	5	–	0	–	0
Texas	1	–	0	–	0	6	–	0	–	0
Sewanee +	5	–	0	–	1	6	–	1	–	1
North Carolina	3	–	0	–	1	4	–	1	–	3
Vanderbilt	2	–	3	–	1	4	–	4	–	1
Alabama	1	–	3	–	0	2	–	3	–	0
Nashville	1	–	3	–	0	2	–	3	–	0
Georgia	1	–	4	–	0	2	–	4	–	0
Tennessee	0	–	2	–	1	3	–	2	–	1
Cumberland (TN)	0	–	1	–	0	0	–	1	–	0
LSU	0	–	1	–	0	2	–	2	–	0
Kentucky State	0	–	2	–	0	4	–	6	–	0
Ole Miss	0	–	3	–	0	0	–	3	–	0
Georgia Tech	0	–	3	–	0	0	–	4	–	0
$ – Conference champion

The 1900 Auburn Tigers football team represented Auburn University in the 1900 Southern Intercollegiate Athletic Association football season. It was the Tigers' 9th overall season and they competed as a member of the Southern Intercollegiate Athletic Association (SIAA). The team was led by head coach Walter H. Watkins, in his first year, and finished with a record of four wins and zero losses (4–0 overall, 4–0 in the SIAA).

== Schedule ==
Date	Opponent	Site	Result	Source
October 22	Nashville	Auburn, AL	W 28–0	
November 10	Tennessee	Birmingham, AL	W 23–0	
November 17	Alabama	Riverside Park; Montgomery, AL (Iron Bowl)	W 53–5	
November 29	at Georgia	Brisbane Park; Atlanta, GA (Deep South's Oldest Rivalry)	W 44–0	

== Game summaries ==
=== Nashville ===
Auburn opened the season against the University of Nashville, On a wet and heavy field, Auburn won 28–0.

=== Tennessee ===
Auburn beat the Tennessee Volunteers 23–0 .

=== Alabama ===
Auburn easily defeated the Alabama team 53–5. Auburn's Yarborough scored 3 touchdowns, once on a run of 75 yards. Noll scored twice, once on a run of 55 yards.

=== Georgia ===
To close the season, Auburn defeated rival Georgia 44–0. One account praises Mike Harvey: "The reason Georgia was defeated so badly by Auburn was due to the fact that Georgia had not only Auburn team to play against but Harvey as well."
