= 1900 Sewanee Tigers football team =

American college football season

1900 Sewanee Tigers football

SIAA co-champion
- Conference: Southern Intercollegiate Athletic Association
- Record: 6–1–1 (5–0–1 SIAA)
- Head coach: Billy Suter (2nd season)
- Captain: Warbler Wilson
- Home stadium: Hardee Field

1900 Southern Intercollegiate Athletic Association football standings
	Conf.					Overall
Team	W		L		T	W		L		T
Clemson +	2	–	0	–	0	6	–	0	–	0
Auburn	4	–	0	–	0	4	–	0	–	0
Tulane	3	–	0	–	0	5	–	0	–	0
Texas	1	–	0	–	0	6	–	0	–	0
Sewanee +	5	–	0	–	1	6	–	1	–	1
North Carolina	3	–	0	–	1	4	–	1	–	3
Vanderbilt	2	–	3	–	1	4	–	4	–	1
Alabama	1	–	3	–	0	2	–	3	–	0
Nashville	1	–	3	–	0	2	–	3	–	0
Georgia	1	–	4	–	0	2	–	4	–	0
Tennessee	0	–	2	–	1	3	–	2	–	1
Cumberland (TN)	0	–	1	–	0	0	–	1	–	0
LSU	0	–	1	–	0	2	–	2	–	0
Kentucky State	0	–	2	–	0	4	–	6	–	0
Ole Miss	0	–	3	–	0	0	–	3	–	0
Georgia Tech	0	–	3	–	0	0	–	4	–	0
$ – Conference champion

The 1900 Sewanee Tigers football team represented the Sewanee Tigers of Sewanee: The University of the South in the 1900 Southern Intercollegiate Athletic Association football season. The loss to Virginia was the first loss since 1897. The team claims an SIAA title.

== Schedule ==
Date	Time	Opponent	Site	Result	Source
October 13		Bethel (TN)*	Hardee Field; Sewanee, TN	W 33–0	
October 17		Cumberland (TN)	Hardee Field; Sewanee, TN	W 18–0	
October 27		vs. Georgia	Atlanta, GA	W 21–6	
October 29		Georgia Tech	Piedmont Park; Atlanta, GA	W 34–0	
November 5		vs. North Carolina	Piedmont Park; Atlanta, GA	T 0–0	
November 10		at Nashville	Peabody Field; Nashville, TN	W 12–0	
November 17		at Vanderbilt	Dudley Field; Nashville, TN (rivalry)	W 11–10	
November 29	2:35 p.m.	vs. Virginia*	Broad Street Park; Richmond, VA	L 5–17	
*Non-conference game; All times are in Eastern time

== Players ==
=== Varsity lettermen ===
==== Line ====
Player	Position	Games started	Hometown	Prep school	Height	Weight	Age
Ralph Peters Black	end		Atlanta, Georgia		6'0"	158	
Richard E. Bolling	tackle		Edna, Texas		5'10"		
William "Wild Bill" Claiborne	guard		Amherst Co., Virginia	Roanoke College	6'0"	190	
L. C. Dickerson	guard						
John William "Deacon" Jones	tackle		Marshall, Texas				
Joseph Lee Kirby-Smith	tackle		Sewanee, Tennessee			156	
Hugh Miller Thompson "Bunny" Pearce	end		Jackson, Mississippi		5'3"	125	
Henry D. Phillips	guard				6'4"	185	
William H. Poole	center		Glyndon, Maryland		6'0"	185	20

==== Backfield ====
Player	Position	Games started	Hometown	Prep school	Height	Weight	Age
Preston S. Brooks	back		Sewanee, Tennessee				
Charles B. Colmore	back						
Rupert Colmore	halfback		Sewanee, Tennessee			155	
Ringland F. "Rex" Kilpatrick	halfback		Bridgeport, Alabama		6'1"	185	19
Henry "Diddy" Seibels	halfback		Montgomery, Alabama		5'10"	170	24
Ormond Simkins	fullback		Corsicana, Texas		5'10"	163	21
J. L. Suter	back						
William "Warbler" Wilson	quarterback		Rock Hill, South Carolina		5'10"	154	23

==== Subs ====
Player	Position	Hometown	Prep school	Height	Weight	Age
William Aiken
James G. Anderson
R. N. Atkinson
E. H. Blount
Henry T. Bull
Geoffrey Cadman
Thaddeus Cheatham
M. M. Cook
Harris G. Cope	quarterback					
W. E. Cox
J. W. Crane
Albert T. Davidson		Augusta, Georgia				
Thomas Evans
George Floyd
John Gilliam
Leidy Hagerty
R. E. Helvey
Cadwallader Jones
Raymond Knight
Maynard Marshall
C. M. Murray
C. W. Radford
Ira C. Somers
J. H. Swann
Royal Tucker
Ed Ward
Halsey Werlein
