= 1900 Georgia Bulldogs football team =

American college football season

1900 Georgia Bulldogs football
- Conference: Southern Intercollegiate Athletic Association
- Record: 2–4 (1–4 SIAA)
- Head coach: E. E. Jones (1st season)
- Captain: F. K. McCutcheon
- Home stadium: Herty Field

1900 Southern Intercollegiate Athletic Association football standings
	Conf.					Overall
Team	W		L		T	W		L		T
Clemson +	2	–	0	–	0	6	–	0	–	0
Auburn	4	–	0	–	0	4	–	0	–	0
Tulane	3	–	0	–	0	5	–	0	–	0
Texas	1	–	0	–	0	6	–	0	–	0
Sewanee +	5	–	0	–	1	6	–	1	–	1
North Carolina	3	–	0	–	1	4	–	1	–	3
Vanderbilt	2	–	3	–	1	4	–	4	–	1
Alabama	1	–	3	–	0	2	–	3	–	0
Nashville	1	–	3	–	0	2	–	3	–	0
Georgia	1	–	4	–	0	2	–	4	–	0
Tennessee	0	–	2	–	1	3	–	2	–	1
Cumberland (TN)	0	–	1	–	0	0	–	1	–	0
LSU	0	–	1	–	0	2	–	2	–	0
Kentucky State	0	–	2	–	0	4	–	6	–	0
Ole Miss	0	–	3	–	0	0	–	3	–	0
Georgia Tech	0	–	3	–	0	0	–	4	–	0
$ – Conference champion

The 1900 Georgia Bulldogs football team represented the University of Georgia during the 1900 Southern Intercollegiate Athletic Association football season. The Bulldogs competed as a member of the Southern Intercollegiate Athletic Association (SIAA) and completed the season with a 2–4 record; no improvement at all over the previous year's mark under coach Gordon Saussy (2–3–1). Although the season started well with back-to-back victories, including Georgia's fourth straight victory over Georgia Tech, it ended with four consecutive losses. In fact, Georgia was outscored 99–0 in the last two games of the season at the hands of North Carolina and Auburn.

Matters were not helped by the fact that Georgia only had three starting players return to the team from the 1899 team. One of the star players on the 1900 team was a young man who weighed only 110 pounds, but made up for his lack of size with skill, speed, agility and leadership skills. A notable player from the 1900 season was center Harold Hirsch. Hirsch played for Georgia during the 1900 and 1901 seasons and later became an influential attorney. In 1932, the University of Georgia School of Law moved into a building called the Harold Hirsch Law Building, named for Hirsch.

== Schedule ==
Date	Opponent	Site	Result	Source
October 13	at Georgia Tech	Piedmont Park; Atlanta, GA (rivalry)	W 12–0	
October 20	South Carolina*	Herty Field; Athens, GA (rivalry)	W 5–0	
October 27	vs. Sewanee	Atlanta, GA	L 6–21	
November 11	Clemson	Herty Field; Athens, GA (rivalry)	L 5–39	
November 17	vs. North Carolina	State Fairgrounds; Raleigh, NC	L 0–55	
November 29	vs. Auburn	Brisbane Park; Atlanta, GA (Deep South's Oldest Rivalry)	L 0–44	
*Non-conference game
