= 1900 Vanderbilt Commodores football team =

American college football season

1900 Vanderbilt Commodores football
- Conference: Southern Intercollegiate Athletic Association
- Record: 4–4–1 (2–3–1 SIAA)
- Head coach: James L. Crane (2nd season)
- Captain: J. F. H. Barbee
- Home stadium: Dudley Field

1900 Southern Intercollegiate Athletic Association football standings
| | Conf. | | | | | Overall |
| Team | W | | L | | T | W | | L | | T |
|---|---|---|---|---|---|---|---|---|---|---|
| Clemson + | 2 | – | 0 | – | 0 | 6 | – | 0 | – | 0 |
| Auburn | 4 | – | 0 | – | 0 | 4 | – | 0 | – | 0 |
| Tulane | 3 | – | 0 | – | 0 | 5 | – | 0 | – | 0 |
| Texas | 1 | – | 0 | – | 0 | 6 | – | 0 | – | 0 |
| Sewanee + | 5 | – | 0 | – | 1 | 6 | – | 1 | – | 1 |
| North Carolina | 3 | – | 0 | – | 1 | 4 | – | 1 | – | 3 |
| Vanderbilt | 2 | – | 3 | – | 1 | 4 | – | 4 | – | 1 |
| Alabama | 1 | – | 3 | – | 0 | 2 | – | 3 | – | 0 |
| Nashville | 1 | – | 3 | – | 0 | 2 | – | 3 | – | 0 |
| Georgia | 1 | – | 4 | – | 0 | 2 | – | 4 | – | 0 |
| Tennessee | 0 | – | 2 | – | 1 | 3 | – | 2 | – | 1 |
| Cumberland (TN) | 0 | – | 1 | – | 0 | 0 | – | 1 | – | 0 |
| LSU | 0 | – | 1 | – | 0 | 2 | – | 2 | – | 0 |
| Kentucky State | 0 | – | 2 | – | 0 | 4 | – | 6 | – | 0 |
| Ole Miss | 0 | – | 3 | – | 0 | 0 | – | 3 | – | 0 |
| Georgia Tech | 0 | – | 3 | – | 0 | 0 | – | 4 | – | 0 |
$ – Conference champion

The 1900 Vanderbilt Commodores football team represented Vanderbilt University during the 1900 Southern Intercollegiate Athletic Association football season. The Commodores were coached by James L. Crane, in his second year as head coach. The loss to Texas was the first intersectional contest at the State Fair of Texas.

== Schedule ==
| Date | Opponent | Site | Result | Source |
|---|---|---|---|---|
| October 6 | Ole Miss | Dudley Field; Nashville, TN (rivalry) | W 6–0 | |
| October 13 | vs. Texas | Dallas Fair Grounds; Dallas, TX | L 0–22 | |
| October 22 | Tennessee | Dudley Field; Nashville, TN (rivalry) | T 0–0 | |
| October 27 | Centre* | Dudley Field; Nashville, TN | L 0–11 | |
| November 3 | North Carolina | Dudley Field; Nashville, TN | L 0–48 | |
| November 10 | Central (KY)* | Dudley Field; Nashville, TN | W 27–0 | |
| November 17 | Sewanee | Dudley Field; Nashville, TN (rivalry) | L 10–11 | |
| November 24 | Bethel (TN)* | Dudley Field; Nashville, TN | W 22–0 | |
| November 29 | Nashville | Dudley Field; Nashville, TN | W 18–0 | |
*Non-conference game
