= 1900 Tennessee Volunteers football team =

American college football season

1900 Tennessee Volunteers football
- Conference: Southern Intercollegiate Athletic Association
- Record: 3–2–1 (0–2–1 SIAA)
- Head coach: J. A. Pierce (2nd season)
- Captain: W. M. Newman
- Home stadium: Baldwin Park

1900 Southern Intercollegiate Athletic Association football standings
	Conf.					Overall
Team	W		L		T	W		L		T
Clemson +	2	–	0	–	0	6	–	0	–	0
Auburn	4	–	0	–	0	4	–	0	–	0
Tulane	3	–	0	–	0	5	–	0	–	0
Texas	1	–	0	–	0	6	–	0	–	0
Sewanee +	5	–	0	–	1	6	–	1	–	1
North Carolina	3	–	0	–	1	4	–	1	–	3
Vanderbilt	2	–	3	–	1	4	–	4	–	1
Alabama	1	–	3	–	0	2	–	3	–	0
Nashville	1	–	3	–	0	2	–	3	–	0
Georgia	1	–	4	–	0	2	–	4	–	0
Tennessee	0	–	2	–	1	3	–	2	–	1
Cumberland (TN)	0	–	1	–	0	0	–	1	–	0
LSU	0	–	1	–	0	2	–	2	–	0
Kentucky State	0	–	2	–	0	4	–	6	–	0
Ole Miss	0	–	3	–	0	0	–	3	–	0
Georgia Tech	0	–	3	–	0	0	–	4	–	0
$ – Conference champion

The 1900 Tennessee Volunteers football team represented the University of Tennessee in the 1900 Southern Intercollegiate Athletic Association football season. Led by J. A. Pierce in second and final season as head coach, the Volunteers compiled an overall record of 3–2–1 with a mark of 0–2–1 in conference play. The first tie in program history came against Vanderbilt on October 22, at Nashville.

== Schedule ==
Date	Opponent	Site	Result	Source
October 10	King*	Baldwin Park; Knoxville, TN	W 22–0	
October 22	at Vanderbilt	Dudley Field; Nashville, TN (rivalry)	T 0–0	
November 1	North Carolina	Baldwin Park; Knoxville, TN	L 5–22	
November 10	vs. Auburn	Birmingham, AL (rivalry)	L 0–23	
November 26	Grant*	Baldwin Park; Knoxville, TN	W 28–0	
November 29	Georgetown (KY)*	Baldwin Park; Knoxville, TN	W 12–6	
*Non-conference game
