= 1900 Nashville Garnet and Blue football team =

American college football season

1900 Nashville Garnet and Blue football
- Conference: Southern Intercollegiate Athletic Association
- Record: 2–3 (1–3 SIAA)
- Head coach: Charley Moran (1st season)
- Home stadium: Peabody Field

1900 Southern Intercollegiate Athletic Association football standings
	Conf.					Overall
Team	W		L		T	W		L		T
Clemson +	2	–	0	–	0	6	–	0	–	0
Auburn	4	–	0	–	0	4	–	0	–	0
Tulane	3	–	0	–	0	5	–	0	–	0
Texas	1	–	0	–	0	6	–	0	–	0
Sewanee +	5	–	0	–	1	6	–	1	–	1
North Carolina	3	–	0	–	1	4	–	1	–	3
Vanderbilt	2	–	3	–	1	4	–	4	–	1
Alabama	1	–	3	–	0	2	–	3	–	0
Nashville	1	–	3	–	0	2	–	3	–	0
Georgia	1	–	4	–	0	2	–	4	–	0
Tennessee	0	–	2	–	1	3	–	2	–	1
Cumberland (TN)	0	–	1	–	0	0	–	1	–	0
LSU	0	–	1	–	0	2	–	2	–	0
Kentucky State	0	–	2	–	0	4	–	6	–	0
Ole Miss	0	–	3	–	0	0	–	3	–	0
Georgia Tech	0	–	3	–	0	0	–	4	–	0
$ – Conference champion

The 1900 Nashville Garnet and Blue football team represented the University of Nashville during the 1900 Southern Intercollegiate Athletic Association football season. The team was led by first-year head coach Charley Moran. Nashville lost to Auburn on a wet and heavy field.

== Schedule ==
Date	Opponent	Site	Result	Source
October 20	at Georgia Tech	Piedmont Park; Atlanta, GA	W 23–0	
October 22	at Auburn	Auburn, AL	L 0–28	
November 10	Sewanee	Peabody Field; Nashville, TN	L 0–12	
November 17	Bethel (TN)	Peabody Field; Nashville, TN	W 12–6	
November 29	at Vanderbilt	Dudley Field; Nashville, TN	L 0–18	
