= 1900 Texas Longhorns football team =

American college football season

1900 Texas Longhorns football
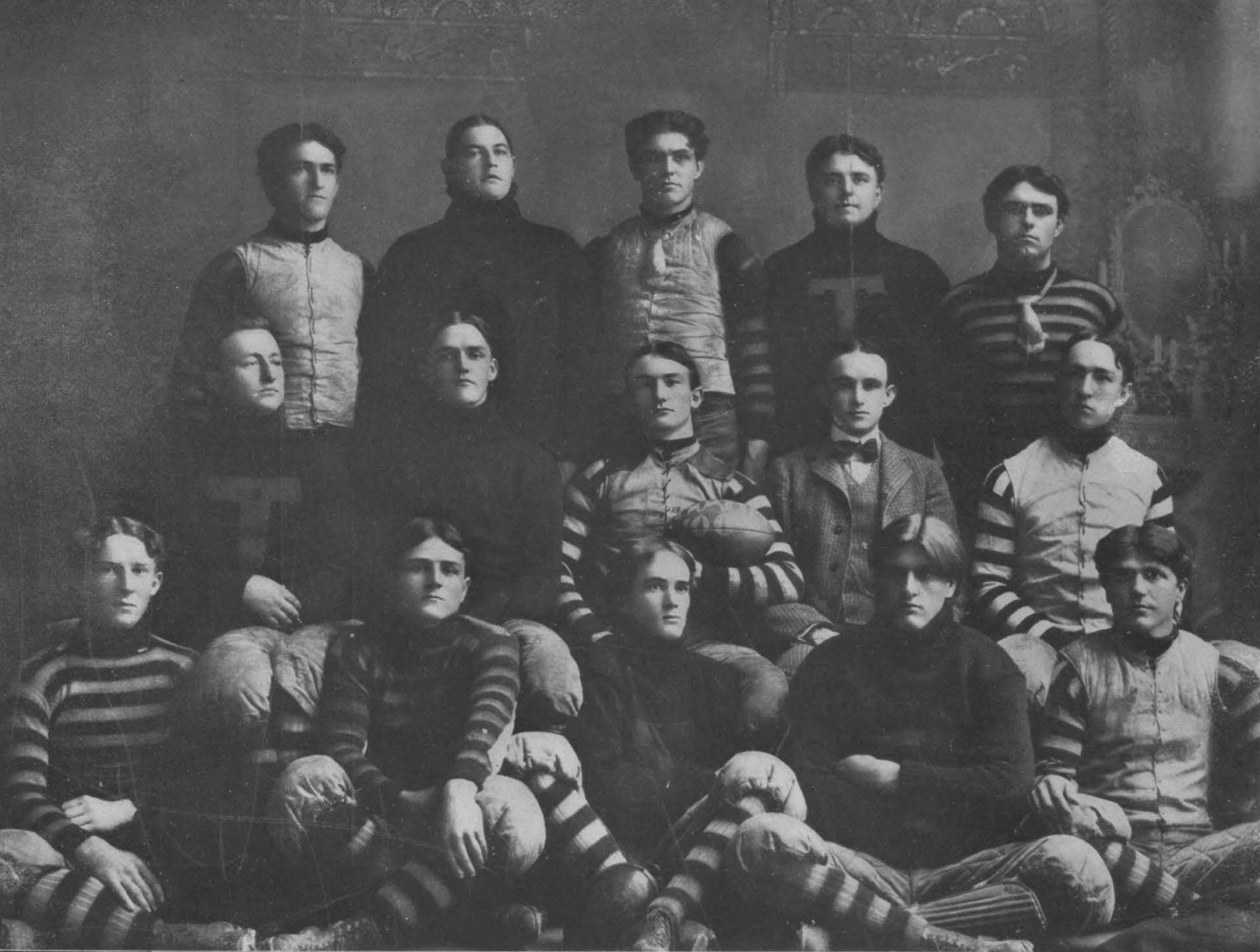
- Conference: Southern Intercollegiate Athletic Association
- Record: 6–0 (1–0 SIAA)
- Head coach: Samuel Huston Thompson (1st season)
- Captain: Walter Schreiner
- Home stadium: Varsity Athletic Field

1900 Southern Intercollegiate Athletic Association football standings
	Conf.					Overall
Team	W		L		T	W		L		T
Clemson +	2	–	0	–	0	6	–	0	–	0
Auburn	4	–	0	–	0	4	–	0	–	0
Tulane	3	–	0	–	0	5	–	0	–	0
Texas	1	–	0	–	0	6	–	0	–	0
Sewanee +	5	–	0	–	1	6	–	1	–	1
North Carolina	3	–	0	–	1	4	–	1	–	3
Vanderbilt	2	–	3	–	1	4	–	4	–	1
Alabama	1	–	3	–	0	2	–	3	–	0
Nashville	1	–	3	–	0	2	–	3	–	0
Georgia	1	–	4	–	0	2	–	4	–	0
Tennessee	0	–	2	–	1	3	–	2	–	1
Cumberland (TN)	0	–	1	–	0	0	–	1	–	0
LSU	0	–	1	–	0	2	–	2	–	0
Kentucky State	0	–	2	–	0	4	–	6	–	0
Ole Miss	0	–	3	–	0	0	–	3	–	0
Georgia Tech	0	–	3	–	0	0	–	4	–	0
$ – Conference champion

The 1900 Texas 'Varsity football team represented The University of Texas (now known as the University of Texas at Austin Longhorns) in the 1900 college football season. In their first year under head coach Samuel Huston Thompson, the Longhorns compiled an undefeated 6–0 and outscored opponents by a collective total of 113 to 13.

== Schedule ==
Date	Opponent	Site	Result	Attendance	Source
October 10	Oklahoma*	Varsity Athletic Field; Austin, TX (Red River Shootout)	W 28–2		
October 13	vs. Vanderbilt	Dallas Fair Grounds; Dallas, TX	W 22–0	3,000	
October 27	vs. Texas A&M*	San Antonio Fairgrounds; San Antonio, TX (rivalry)	W 5–0	1,200	
November 17	Missouri*	Varsity Athletic Field; Austin, TX	W 17–11		
November 24	Kansas City Medical*	Varsity Athletic Field; Austin, TX	W 30–0		
November 29	Texas A&M*	Varsity Athletic Field; Austin, TX	W 11–0	800	
*Non-conference game

== Personnel ==
=== Line ===
Player	Position	Games played	Home town	Height	Weight	Age
Walter Schreiner	Right End	6	Kerrville, Texas	5'10"	154	23
M. McMahon	Right Tackle	6	Savoy, Texas	5'11"	175	22
L.G. Sam	Right Guard	6	Houston, Texas	6'2"	231	21
Jim McCall	Center	6	Weatherford, Texas	5'8"	180	19
D. A. McDaniel	Left Guard	6	Orangeville, Texas	6'2"	195	24
T.A. Kinder	Left Tackle	6	Plainview, Texas	5'10"	180	20
Walter Montieth	Left End	6	Belton, Texas	5'11"	165	23

=== Backfield ===
Player	Position	Games played	Home town	Height	Weight	Age
Semp Russ	Quarterback	6	San Antonio, Texas	5'7"	145	23
S.F. Leslie	Right Halfback	6	Bailey, Texas	5'10"	192	23
M.E. Kennard	Left Halfback	3	Grandview, Texas	5'10"	180	20
James Hart	Fullback	6	Austin, Texas	6'2"	170	22

=== Subs ===
Player	Position	Games played	Home town	Height	Weight	Age
John De Lesdenier	Quarterback	4	Houston, Texas	5'8"	170	20
I.V. Duncan	End	2	Wharton, Texas	5'10"	154	19
Griggs	Guard	3	Houston, Texas	6'1"	218	20
Henne*	Left Guard					
Ed Bewley*	Fullback					
Connor*	Quarterback					
Leonard J. Brown*	Right End					

Started on the second team*
