= 1900 North Carolina Tar Heels football team =

American college football season

1900 North Carolina Tar Heels football
- Conference: Southern Intercollegiate Athletic Association
- Record: 4–1–3 (3–0–1 SIAA)
- Head coach: William A. Reynolds (4th season)
- Assistant coach: John Gere Jayne (2nd season)
- Captain: Frank M. Osborne
- Home stadium: Campus Athletic Field (II)

1900 Southern Intercollegiate Athletic Association football standings
	Conf.					Overall
Team	W		L		T	W		L		T
Clemson +	2	–	0	–	0	6	–	0	–	0
Auburn	4	–	0	–	0	4	–	0	–	0
Tulane	3	–	0	–	0	5	–	0	–	0
Texas	1	–	0	–	0	6	–	0	–	0
Sewanee +	5	–	0	–	1	6	–	1	–	1
North Carolina	3	–	0	–	1	4	–	1	–	3
Vanderbilt	2	–	3	–	1	4	–	4	–	1
Alabama	1	–	3	–	0	2	–	3	–	0
Nashville	1	–	3	–	0	2	–	3	–	0
Georgia	1	–	4	–	0	2	–	4	–	0
Tennessee	0	–	2	–	1	3	–	2	–	1
Cumberland (TN)	0	–	1	–	0	0	–	1	–	0
LSU	0	–	1	–	0	2	–	2	–	0
Kentucky State	0	–	2	–	0	4	–	6	–	0
Ole Miss	0	–	3	–	0	0	–	3	–	0
Georgia Tech	0	–	3	–	0	0	–	4	–	0
$ – Conference champion

The 1900 North Carolina Tar Heels football team represented the University of North Carolina in the 1900 Southern Intercollegiate Athletic Association football season. They played eight games with a final record of 4–1–3 (3-0-1 in the SIAA). The team captain for the 1900 season was Frank M. Osborne.

== Schedule ==
Date	Time	Opponent	Site	Result	Attendance	Source
October 6	1:30 p.m.	Deaf & Dumb Institute	Campus Athletic Field (II); Chapel Hill, NC	W 38–0		
October 27	3:45 p.m.	VPI	Campus Athletic Field (II); Chapel Hill, NC	T 0–0		
November 1	3:30 p.m.	at Tennessee	Baldwin Park; Knoxville, TN	W 22–5	400	
November 3	2:13 p.m.	at Vanderbilt	Old Dudley Field; Nashville, TN	W 48–0		
November 5	2:30 p.m.	vs. Sewanee	Piedmont Park; Atlanta, GA	T 0–0		
November 17	3:15 p.m.	vs. Georgia	State Fairgrounds (II); Raleigh, NC	W 55–0	800	
November 24	2:45 p.m.	vs. Virginia	League Park (I); Norfolk, VA (South's Oldest Rivalry)	L 0–17	6,000	
November 29	3:00 p.m.	at Georgetown	Georgetown Field; Washington, DC	T 0–0	4,000	

== Players ==
=== Line ===
Player	Position	Games started	Hometown	Prep school	Height	Weight	Age
Frank Bennett	tackle		Wadesboro, North Carolina		6'0"	173	
Tod R. Brem	guard						
Walter Council	center		Council, North Carolina			195	
Frank Foust	tackle					190	
Frank M. Osborne	end		Fletcher, North Carolina				
Frank B. Rankin	guard						
William F. Smathers	end						

=== Backfield ===
Player	Position	Games started	Hometown	Prep school	Height	Weight	Age
Ernest Graves	fullback		Chapel Hill, North Carolina				
Jim MacRae	halfback		Fayetteville, North Carolina	Nashville			
Metrah Makeley	quarterback						
Wade H. Oldham	halfback						

=== Subs ===
Player	Position	Hometown	Prep school	Height	Weight	Age
Berkeley	halfback					
John Donnelly	halfback					
Ebbs	halfback					
Louis Graves	quarterback	Chapel Hill, North Carolina				
J. B. Martin	halfback					
Orr	guard					
Isaac Phifer	guard					
Roberts	tackle					
