= 1900 Tulane Olive and Blue football team =

American college football season

1900 Tulane Olive and Blue football
- Conference: Southern Intercollegiate Athletic Association
- Record: 5–0 (3–0 SIAA)
- Head coach: H. T. Summersgill (1st season)
- Captain: Hugh Krumbhaar
- Home stadium: Tulane Athletic Field

1900 Southern Intercollegiate Athletic Association football standings
	Conf.					Overall
Team	W		L		T	W		L		T
Clemson +	2	–	0	–	0	6	–	0	–	0
Auburn	4	–	0	–	0	4	–	0	–	0
Tulane	3	–	0	–	0	5	–	0	–	0
Texas	1	–	0	–	0	6	–	0	–	0
Sewanee +	5	–	0	–	1	6	–	1	–	1
North Carolina	3	–	0	–	1	4	–	1	–	3
Vanderbilt	2	–	3	–	1	4	–	4	–	1
Alabama	1	–	3	–	0	2	–	3	–	0
Nashville	1	–	3	–	0	2	–	3	–	0
Georgia	1	–	4	–	0	2	–	4	–	0
Tennessee	0	–	2	–	1	3	–	2	–	1
Cumberland (TN)	0	–	1	–	0	0	–	1	–	0
LSU	0	–	1	–	0	2	–	2	–	0
Kentucky State	0	–	2	–	0	4	–	6	–	0
Ole Miss	0	–	3	–	0	0	–	3	–	0
Georgia Tech	0	–	3	–	0	0	–	4	–	0
$ – Conference champion

The 1900 Tulane Olive and Blue football team was an American football team that represented Tulane University as a member of the Southern Intercollegiate Athletic Association (SIAA) during the 1900 college football season. In their first year under head coach H. T. Summersgill, the team compiled an overall record of 5–0.

== Schedule ==
Date	Opponent	Site	Result	Source
October 27	Southern Athletic Club*	Tulane Athletic Field; New Orleans, LA	W 23–0	
November 3	at Alabama	The Quad; Tuscaloosa, AL	W 6–0	
November 10	Millsaps*	Tulane Athletic Field; New Orleans, LA	W 35–0	
November 17	LSU	Tulane Athletic Field; New Orleans, LA (rivalry)	W 29–0	
November 29	Ole Miss	Tulane Athletic Field; New Orleans, LA (rivalry)	W 12–0	
*Non-conference game

== Game summaries ==
=== Southern A. C. ===
The season began with a 23–0 defeat of the Southern Athletic Club.

=== Alabama ===
Alabama lost 6–0 with the only points of the game coming on a one-yard Ellis Stearns touchdown run.

=== Millsaps ===
Tulane beat Millsaps, 35–0.

=== LSU ===
Against rival LSU, Tulane won, 29–0.

=== Ole Miss ===
Tulane beat Ole Miss, 12–0, having not allowed a single point all season.
