= 1900 Georgia Tech football team =

American college football season

1900 Georgia Tech football
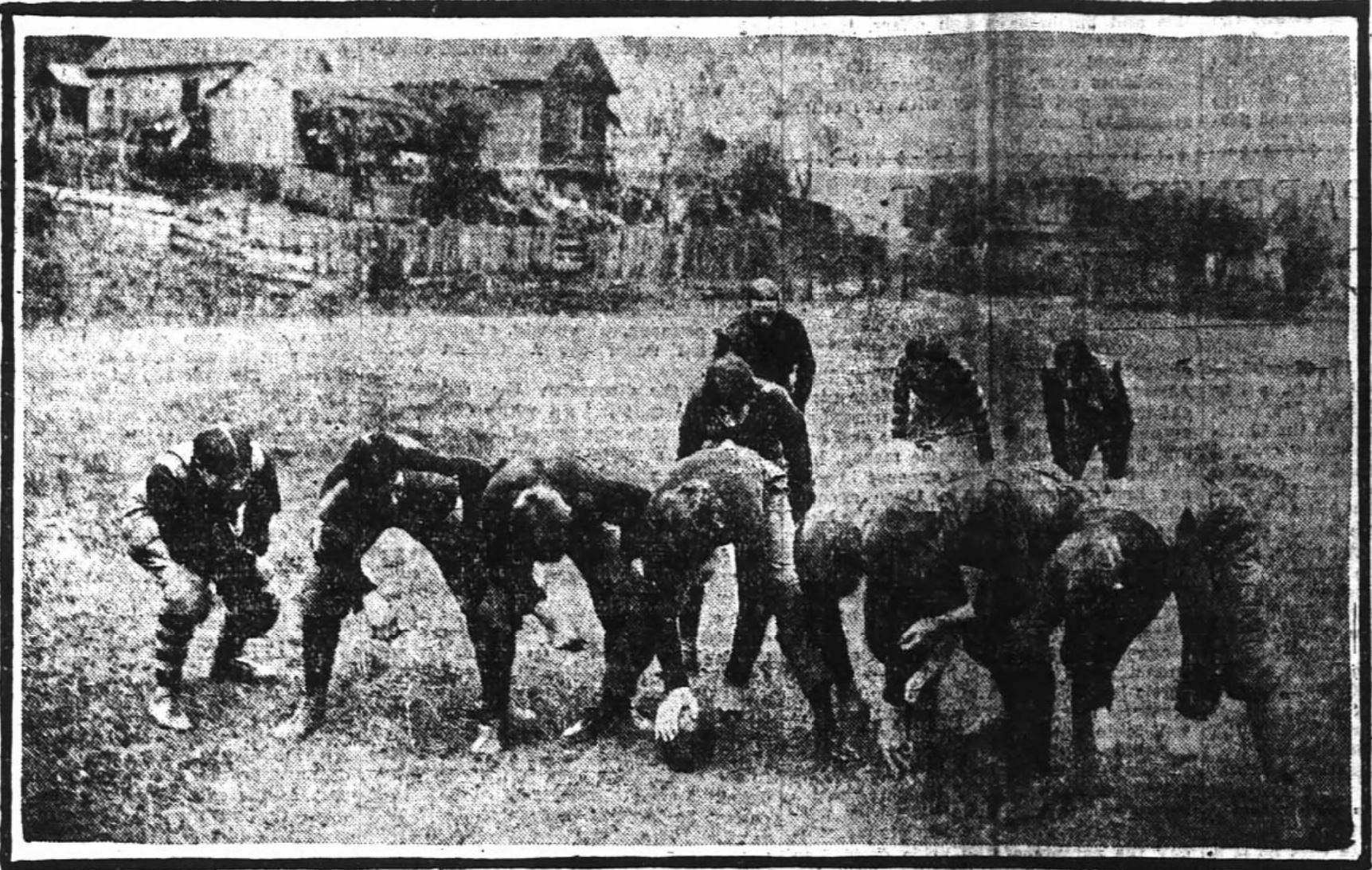
- Conference: Southern Intercollegiate Athletic Association
- Record: 0–4 (0–3 SIAA)
- Head coach: Harris T. Collier (1st season)
- Captains: Morris Yow; Wayne Holman (Note: Lee Clark held the role in a temporary capacity until Yow was elected on October 2. The Georgia Tech football information guide lists W. J. Holman as captain; however, Holman was captain only for the final game of the season following Yow leaving the team due to medical reasons.)
- Home stadium: Piedmont Park

1900 Southern Intercollegiate Athletic Association football standings
	Conf.					Overall
Team	W		L		T	W		L		T
Clemson +	2	–	0	–	0	6	–	0	–	0
Auburn	4	–	0	–	0	4	–	0	–	0
Tulane	3	–	0	–	0	5	–	0	–	0
Texas	1	–	0	–	0	6	–	0	–	0
Sewanee +	5	–	0	–	1	6	–	1	–	1
North Carolina	3	–	0	–	1	4	–	1	–	3
Vanderbilt	2	–	3	–	1	4	–	4	–	1
Alabama	1	–	3	–	0	2	–	3	–	0
Nashville	1	–	3	–	0	2	–	3	–	0
Georgia	1	–	4	–	0	2	–	4	–	0
Tennessee	0	–	2	–	1	3	–	2	–	1
Cumberland (TN)	0	–	1	–	0	0	–	1	–	0
LSU	0	–	1	–	0	2	–	2	–	0
Kentucky State	0	–	2	–	0	4	–	6	–	0
Ole Miss	0	–	3	–	0	0	–	3	–	0
Georgia Tech	0	–	3	–	0	0	–	4	–	0
$ – Conference champion

The 1900 Georgia Tech football team represented the Georgia School of Technology during the 1900 college football season. 1900 was the first year that the team was called the Blacksmiths (Note: Colorful forms, such as "smithies" and "wood and metal workers", were also used at times), although the team was still occasionally referred to as the 'Techs'.

Coming into the season, Tech had not won a game since 1897 and had only scored in three of its previous thirteen games. R. B. Nalley, who had been hired as Tech's coach to much fanfare in 1899, had been unable to produce a win and did not return for the 1900 season. Georgia Tech conducted a national coaching search as President Lyman Hall continued his goal to elevate Tech athletics. Tech competed with Auburn to hire Walter Watkins and with Georgia to hire Art Hillebrand, both former players of football powerhouse Princeton, although neither offer was ultimately successful. The student body raised $1,000 to support the school's athletic association. Hall also hired a new physical director, Dr. W. A. Jackson, to live in the dormitories and supervise the physical training of the students. All of this led to much interest in the upcoming season and an optimistic outlook on how the team would perform since there were many returning players from the previous year. Practice was planned to begin on September 15.

Georgia Tech was not able to find a coach until September 18, when it hired Harris T. Collier, former captain of Virginia and coach of the winless 1899 Tulane team. Practice did not began until the next day, and Collier did not arrive to Atlanta until September 27. Neal was named team manager, and newly joined Morris Yow, a member of the 1898 team, was elected captain on October 2, replacing Lee Clark who had assumed the captaincy as the team had been forming. While Collier was pleased with his team's work on the practice field, he believed that its lack of weight was its main weakness. Still, as what seems the case with each of the early seasons, Tech was said to have compiled "by far the strongest yet put forth by that institution".

As losses mounted during the season, friction began to occur between Coach Collier and the team and Collier almost quit the team. Fans did not show up to the games as expected leading to small gate receipts, financial trouble, and concerns the team would not be able to fulfill Collier's contract. Collier agreed to coach the team through Thanksgiving. Captain Yow left the team following the game against Sewanee on doctor's orders due to rheumatism. Manager Neal left the team–under the pretense of health concerns–and an election for a new manager was held, eventually electing Andrew Pittman. To compound the financial woes, many fans were able to watch Tech's final match against Davidson without having to pass through the ticket line, causing gate receipts to be disappointing.

Much like the previous two seasons, 1900 was a failure for Georgia Tech. The team lost all four of its games, capping a 14-match losing streak, and scored in only one contest. Financial woes plagued the season, and the Georgia Tech Athletic Association fell into a debt of $625 which threatened to cancel the school's upcoming baseball season and the 1901 football season. The Atlanta Journal helped raise money for the Tech's athletic programs. Clemson's athletic association contributed to the fund.

== Schedule ==
Date	Time	Opponent	Site	Result	Attendance	Source
October 13	3:30 p.m.	Georgia	Piedmont Park; Atlanta, GA (rivalry)	L 0–12	1,500	
October 20	3:30 p.m.	Nashville	Piedmont Park; Atlanta, GA	L 0–23		
October 29	3:00 p.m.	Sewanee	Piedmont Park; Atlanta, GA	L 0–34		
November 3		Auburn	Drill Field; Auburn, AL	Cancelled (Note: Georgia Tech's faculty prohibited the team from traveling outside of the state to play football.)		
November 29		vs. Davidson*	Augusta, GA	L 6–38	1,000	
*Non-conference game

Other games against LSU, North Carolina, South Carolina, Tennessee, Tulane, Virginia, and a local club team in Jacksonville, Florida, were proposed but did not ultimately materialize.

== Game summaries ==
Georgia Red and Black (0–0–0) at Georgia Tech Blacksmiths (0–0–0)

Quarter	1	2	Total
Georgia	12	0	12
Georgia Tech	0	0	0

at Piedmont Park • Atlanta, Georgia

- Date: Saturday, October 13, 1900
- Game time: 3:30 p.m.
- Game attendance: 1,500
- Referee: Unknown

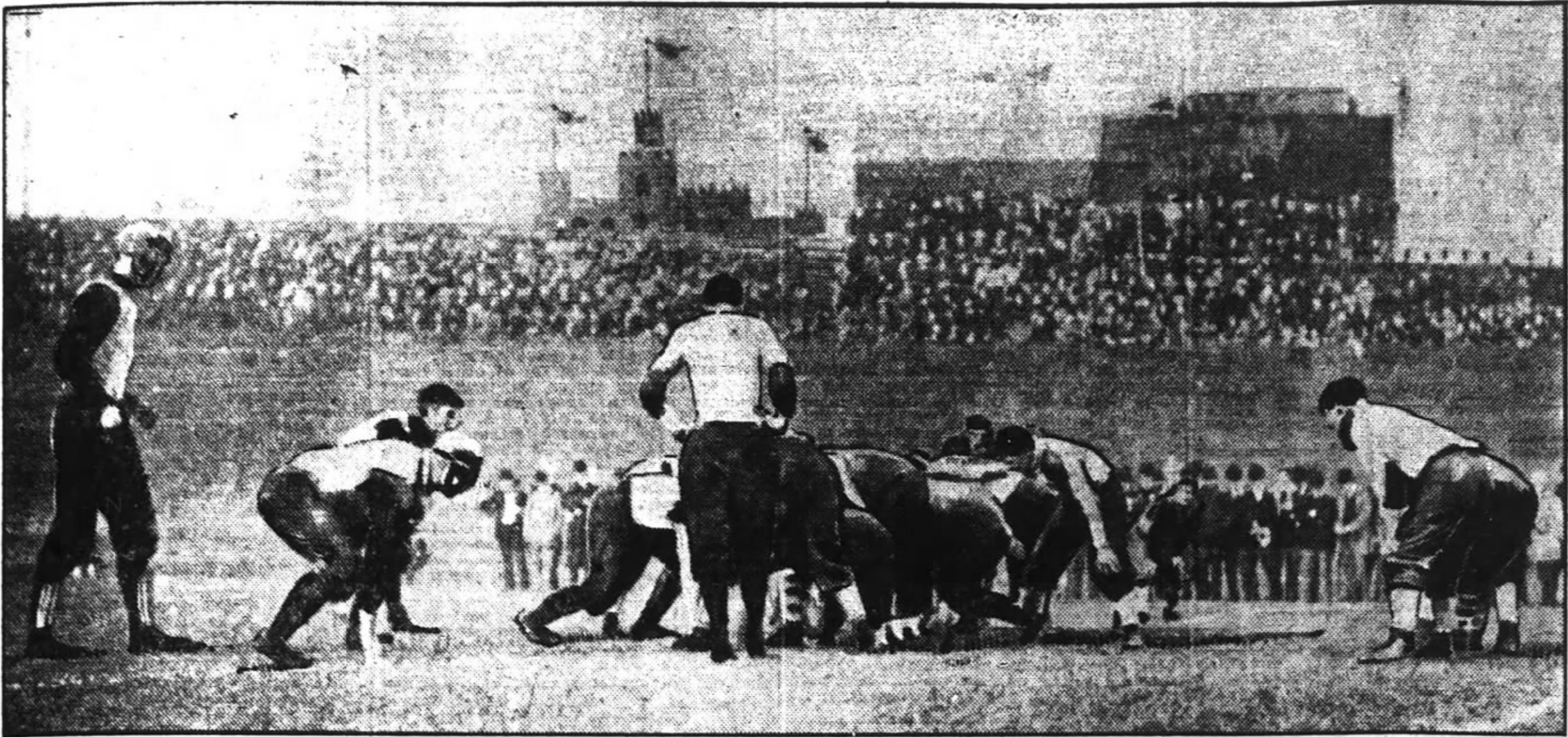
"A critical moment in the game; Georgia with the ball"

The first game of the season was a much-anticipated game against Georgia that was the fifth game in the rivalry and the first played in Atlanta. Georgia had won the last three meetings and led the series 3–1. There was a lot of interest leading up to the game. Leonard Wood, U.S. Governor of Cuba and player-coach of Georgia Tech's 1893 win over Georgia, sent the Blacksmiths his wishes of good luck as encouragement. With pundits perceiving that Georgia Tech had improved and Georgia weakened since the previous year, the teams were considered closely matched. However, the game was not considered to be very well played due to the limited training the teams had received at the beginning of the season and only fifteen minute halves were played due to the poor physical conditioning of both sides. A Civil War reenactment that took place on the fair grounds directly before the game which helped attract a large attendance.

Georgia Tech opened with the ball and immediately punted to Georgia, who methodically marched down the field exploiting Tech's weakness in the center. Georgia's captain and right halfback, Frank McCutcheon, the star of the game, scored the first touchdown with a center rush from the Tech's five-yard line after eight minutes of play. On its next possession, Georgia fumbled, but Tech did the same two plays later. Neither side was able to sustain drives until Tech fumbled again on its forty-yard line. On the next play, McCutcheon ran around the left end for a forty-yard touchdown score. Time was soon called with Georgia leading 12 to 0.

Georgia was winded in the second half and devoted its energy to just preventing Tech from scoring. McCutcheon had left the game and Georgia's fullback, Hewlette, had been ejected for fowling. At the start of the half, Georgia pushed the ball forward but was considerably weaker than in the first half and lost the ball on downs. Georgia Tech attacked Georgia's ends but was unable to advance the ball out of its own territory. The half continued back and forth without any remarkable events and ended with a Georgia victory by a score of 12 to 0. Sullivan and Williamson were Tech's best players. Both teams were criticized for their sluggishness, lack of intensity, and poor tackling.

Nashville Garnet and Blue (3–0–0) at Georgia Tech Blacksmiths (0–1–0)

Quarter	1	2	Total
Nashville	12	11	23
Georgia Tech	0	0	0

at Piedmont Park • Atlanta, Georgia

- Date: Saturday, October 20, 1900
- Game time: 3:30 p.m.
- Game attendance: Unknown
- Referee: McLeod

Georgia Tech played Nashville in a rematch of the previous season's 0–15 loss. Nashville entered the game with three victories while allowing zero points against its defense. Nashville was considered to be the heavier team but the betting leading up to the game was even due to Tech's strong practicing in the week following the Georgia game. Nashville arrived at the game in imposing brand new garnet and blue uniforms.

While Tech is said to have played "30 per cent better than they did in their game with Georgia," Nashville's superior weight made it so they could easily move through Tech's lines. Tech was also able to handle the ball better, but still fumbled the ball a few times. Nashville was able to score two quick touchdowns by Reaves and had its way during most of the game. It scored four touchdowns in all, winning the game 23 to 0. Muse, W. J. Holman, and Towers showed the most hard work for the Blacksmiths.

Sewanee Tigers (3–0–0) at Georgia Tech Blacksmiths (0–2–0)

Quarter	1	2	Total
Sewanee	17	17	34
Georgia Tech	0	0	0

at Piedmont Park • Atlanta, Georgia

- Date: Monday, October 29, 1900
- Game time: 3:00 p.m.
- Game attendance: "Very slim"
- Referee: Unknown

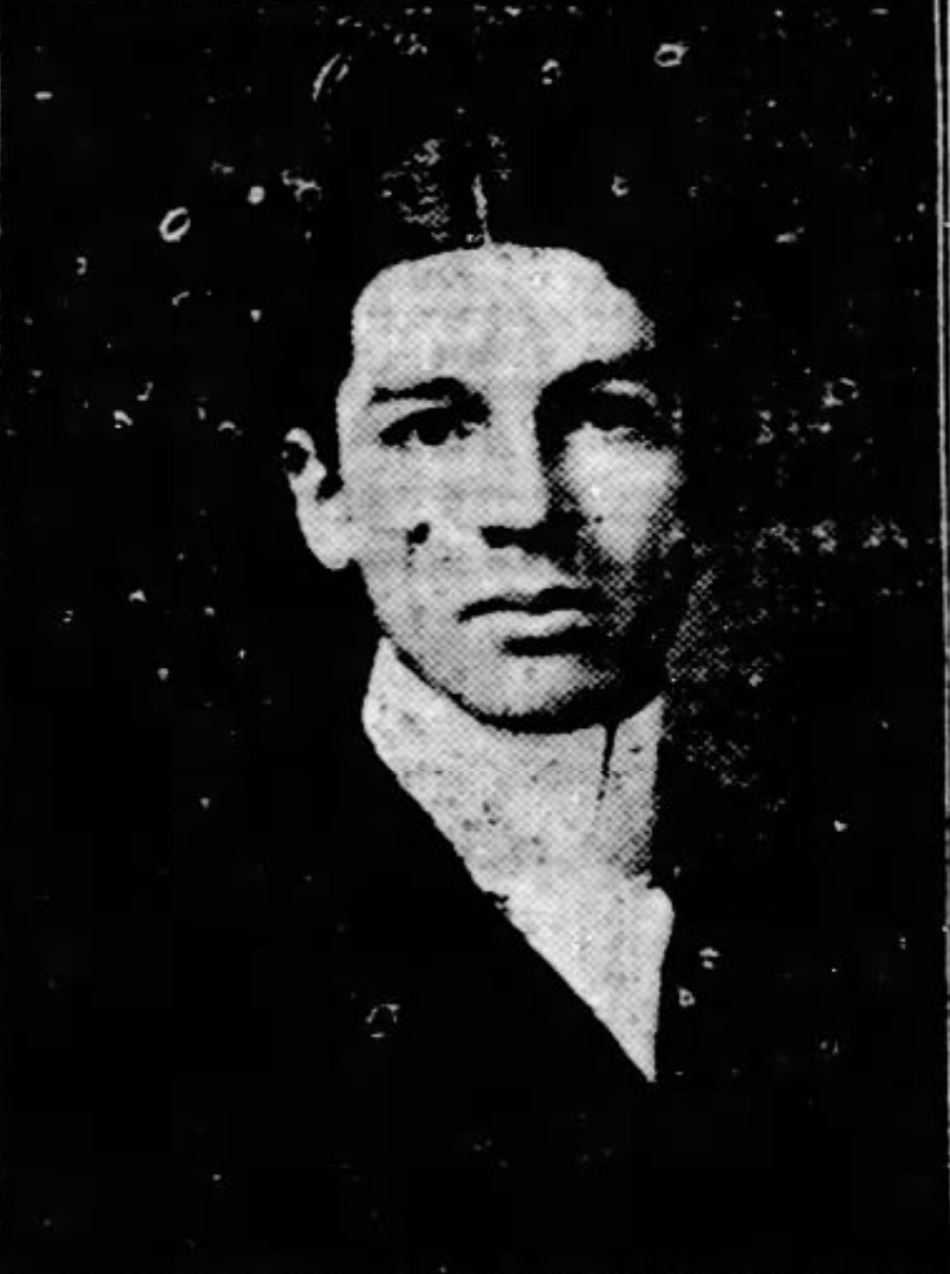
Captain Morris Yow (1879–1933)

Sewanee came into the game on a nineteen-match winning streak and had just beaten Georgia in Atlanta two days earlier. The two teams had only played one previous time, a 32–0 win for Sewanee the previous year. Prior to the game, Tech's Captain Yow, was advised by his doctors to quit playing football altogether due to rheumatic trouble, but Yow made a surprise appearance in the game anyway.

The game was described as the slowest game of the year, though Sewanee's captain, Wilson, exploited Tech's weak outside edge for gains of thirty, forty, and fifty yards. Tech played its best part of the game at the beginning of the game, led by Yow and S. Towers. However, Tech eventually lost its intensity allowing Sewanee to control the remainder of the half. Sewanee scored three touchdowns in each half. Maddox, for Tech, came closest to scoring on a field goal attempt following a Sewanee fumble, but the attempt from the thirty-yard line failed.

Davidson Red and Black (3–1–0) at Georgia Tech Blacksmiths (0–3–0)

Quarter	1	2	Total
Davidson	5	23	28
Georgia Tech	6	0	6

at "The Ball Park" • Augusta, Georgia

- Date: Friday, November 29, 1900
- Game time: Unknown
- Game attendance: 1,000
- Referee: Unknown

The Georgia Tech team had been in quite a bit of turmoil in the month following their loss against Sewanee, losing its captain, its manager, and almost losing its coach. For its final game of the season, Tech met Davidson for the first time. Despite this and Davidson's 3–1–0 record, Tech entered the game as the favorite. Poor planning led to many fans being able to go to the field without having to pay an entrance fee leading to disappointing ticket sales.

Davidson started off with the ball, but lost the balls on downs. The Blacksmiths were able to bring the ball down the field and scored a touchdown by Merritt, its first score of the year. Maddox kicked the extra point. The teams then traded possessions before Davidson's Huie was able to carry the ball around the right end for thirty yards and then Wyman ran for a further fifteen. Davidson scored a touchdown over the center on the next play but missed its extra point. The first half ended with Georgia Tech leading 6 to 5.

The second half was a much different story with Tech being entirely outclassed. This led to rumors that the close score in the first half was due to Davidson trying to skew betting on the game. For the remainder of the game, Davidson was able to run over Tech at will and scored four touchdowns in the second half. Davidson won the game 38–6. This was the final match of the season for both schools.

== Players ==
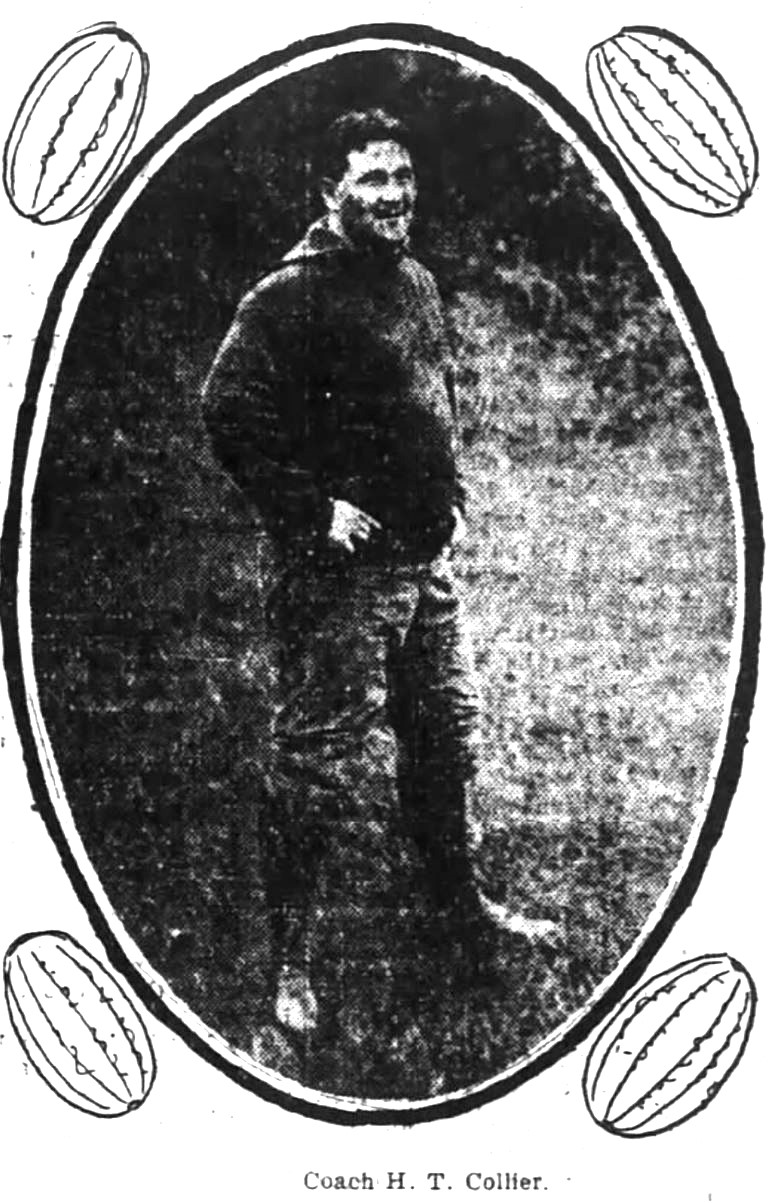
Coach H. T. Collier

Georgia Tech Techs 1900 game starters
	Georgia	Nashville	Sewanee	Davidson
Left End	Muse	Muse	Muse	
Left Tackle	Don Towers	Don Towers	Don Towers	
Left Guard	Hope Hudson	Hope Hudson	Hope Hudson	
Center	Morris Yow (C)	Morris Yow (C)	Morris Yow (C)	Wayne Holman (C)
Right Guard	Gaines	Young	Young	
Right Tackle	Coleman	Billy Holman	Wayne Holman	Don Towers
Right End	McDaniel	McDaniel	McDaniel	
Quarterback	Maddox	Maddox	Maddox	Maddox
Left Halfback	Williamson	Son Towers	Son Towers	
Right Halfback	George Merritt	Birdie Sullivan	Birdie Sullivan	
Fullback	W. Maddox	Fleming	Hall	George Merritt
Substitutes	Lee Clark • Lycette • Neal			

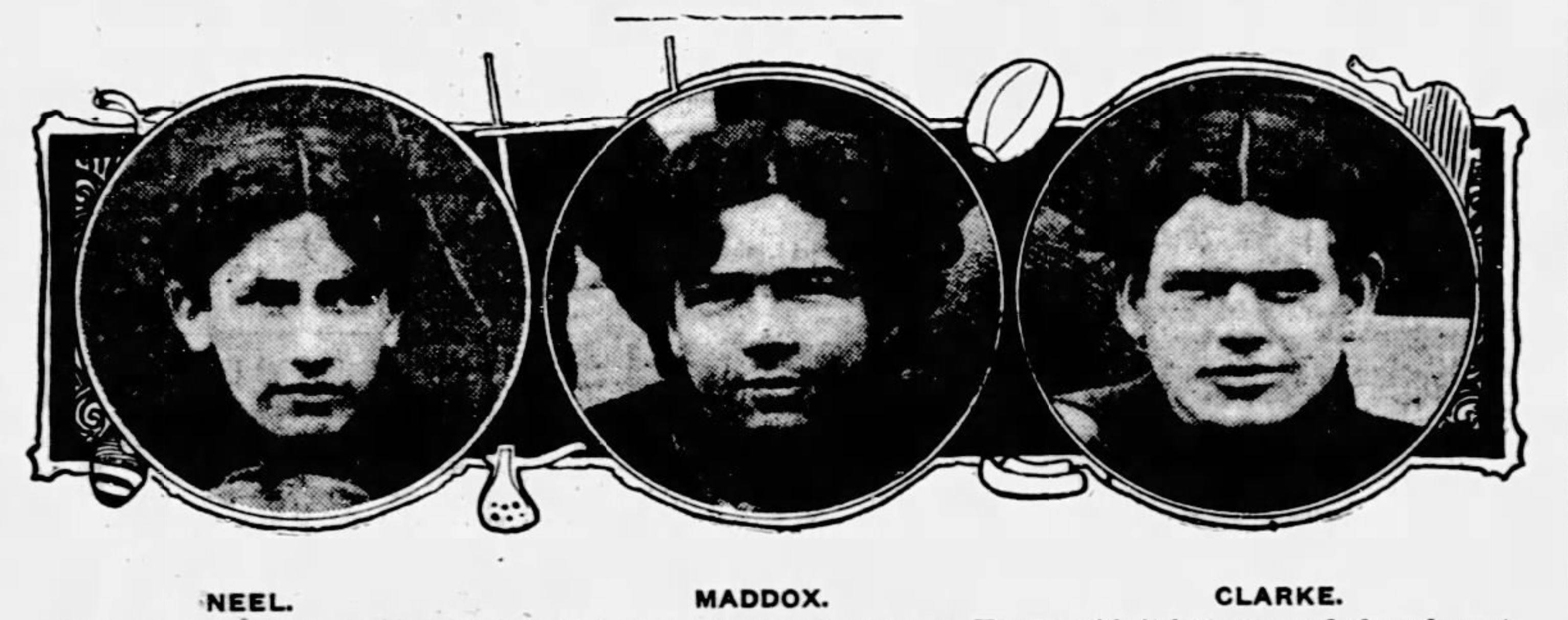
Neal, Maddox, and Lee Clark
