= 1900 Ole Miss Rebels football team =

American college football season

1900 Ole Miss Rebels football
- Conference: Southern Intercollegiate Athletic Association
- Record: 0–3 (0–3 SIAA)
- Head coach: Z. N. Estes (1st season)

1900 Southern Intercollegiate Athletic Association football standings
	Conf.					Overall
Team	W		L		T	W		L		T
Clemson +	2	–	0	–	0	6	–	0	–	0
Auburn	4	–	0	–	0	4	–	0	–	0
Tulane	3	–	0	–	0	5	–	0	–	0
Texas	1	–	0	–	0	6	–	0	–	0
Sewanee +	5	–	0	–	1	6	–	1	–	1
North Carolina	3	–	0	–	1	4	–	1	–	3
Vanderbilt	2	–	3	–	1	4	–	4	–	1
Alabama	1	–	3	–	0	2	–	3	–	0
Nashville	1	–	3	–	0	2	–	3	–	0
Georgia	1	–	4	–	0	2	–	4	–	0
Tennessee	0	–	2	–	1	3	–	2	–	1
Cumberland (TN)	0	–	1	–	0	0	–	1	–	0
LSU	0	–	1	–	0	2	–	2	–	0
Kentucky State	0	–	2	–	0	4	–	6	–	0
Ole Miss	0	–	3	–	0	0	–	3	–	0
Georgia Tech	0	–	3	–	0	0	–	4	–	0
$ – Conference champion

The 1900 Ole Miss Rebels football team represented the University of Mississippi during the 1900 Southern Intercollegiate Athletic Association football season. Led by Z. N. Estes in his first and only season as head coach, the team lost all three of its contests and played no home games.

== Schedule ==
Date	Opponent	Site	Result	Source
October 6	at Vanderbilt	Dudley Field; Nashville, TN (rivalry)	L 0–6	
October 26	at Alabama	The Quad; Tuscaloosa, AL (rivalry)	L 0–12	
November 29	at Tulane	Tulane Athletic Field; New Orleans, LA (rivalry)	L 0–12	
