= Z. N. Estes =

American football player and coach (1877–1943)

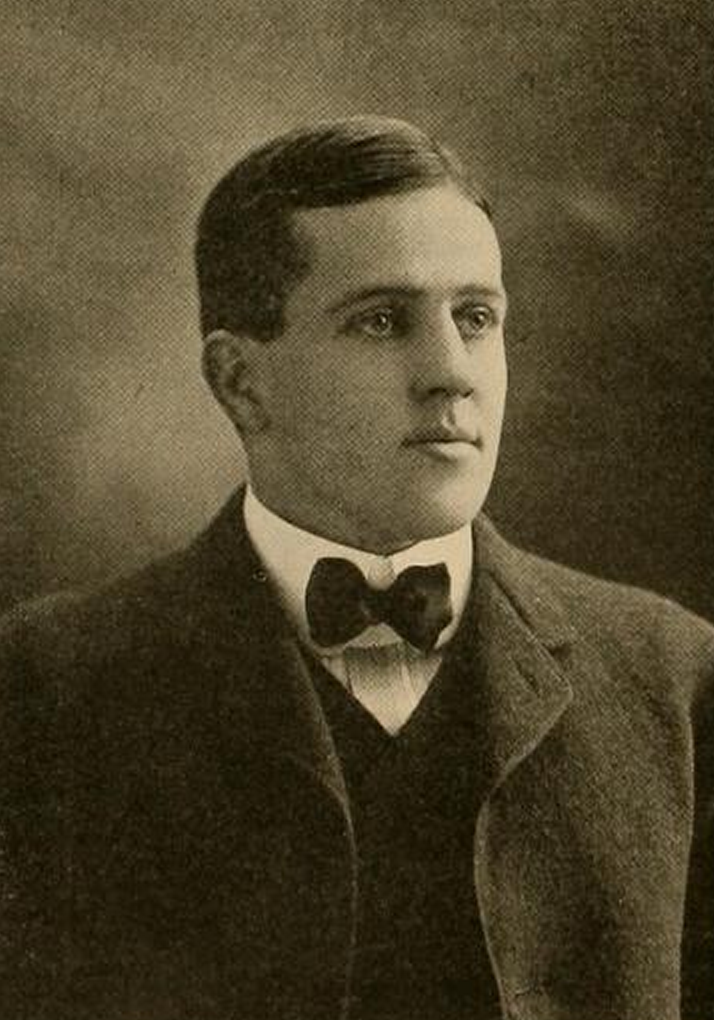
- Estes pictured c. early 1900s

Biographical details
- Born: December 6, 1877; Memphis, Tennessee, U.S.
- Died: February 23, 1943 (aged 65); Memphis, Tennessee, U.S.
- Education: University of Virginia

Playing career
- 1897: Virginia

Coaching career (HC unless noted)
- 1900: Ole Miss

Head coaching record
- Overall: 0–3

Zenas Newton Estes Jr. (December 6, 1877 – February 23, 1943) was an American football coach. He served as the head football coach at the University of Mississippi (Ole Miss) in 1900. During his one-season tenure at Ole Miss, Estes compiled an overall record of zero wins and three losses (0–3). In 1899, he graduated from the University of Virginia in law. He later worked as an attorney Memphis, Tennessee. He died of a heart attack in 1943.

== Head coaching record ==
Year	Team	Overall	Conference	Standing	Bowl/playoffs
Ole MissRe bels (Southern Intercollegiate Athletic Association) (1900)
1900	Ole Miss	0–3	0–3		
Ole Miss:		0–3	0–3		
Total:		0–3			
