= 1900 LSU Tigers football team =

American college football season

1900 LSU Tigers football
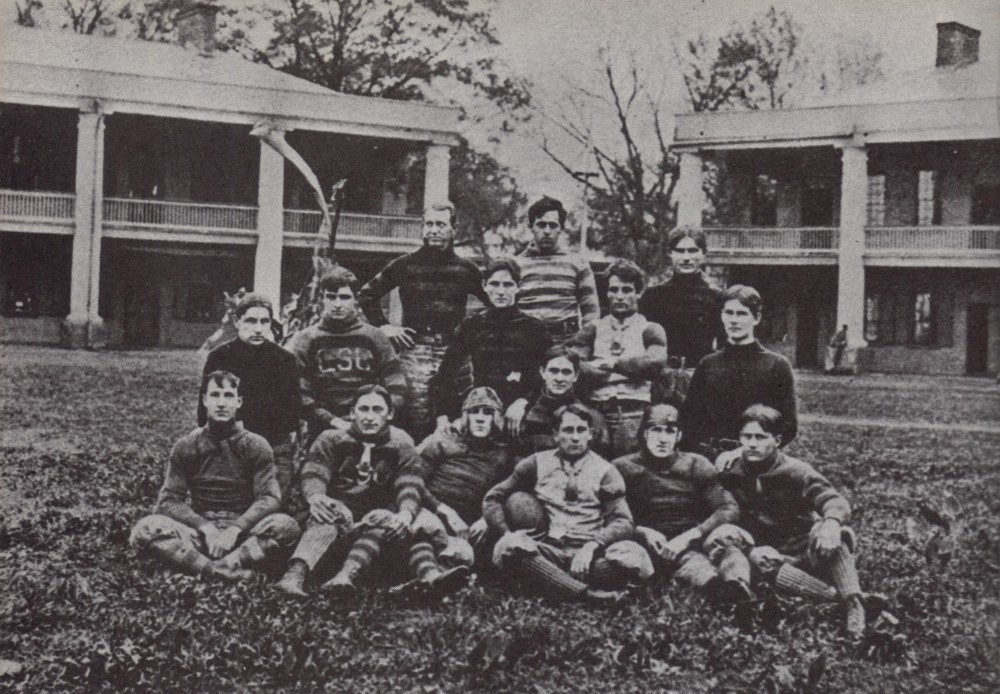
- Conference: Southern Intercollegiate Athletic Association
- Record: 2–2 (0–1 SIAA)
- Head coach: Edmond Chavanne (2nd season)
- Captain: Ivan H. Schwing
- Home stadium: State Field

1900 Southern Intercollegiate Athletic Association football standings
| | Conf. | | | | | Overall |
| Team | W | | L | | T | W | | L | | T |
|---|---|---|---|---|---|---|---|---|---|---|
| Clemson + | 2 | – | 0 | – | 0 | 6 | – | 0 | – | 0 |
| Auburn | 4 | – | 0 | – | 0 | 4 | – | 0 | – | 0 |
| Tulane | 3 | – | 0 | – | 0 | 5 | – | 0 | – | 0 |
| Texas | 1 | – | 0 | – | 0 | 6 | – | 0 | – | 0 |
| Sewanee + | 5 | – | 0 | – | 1 | 6 | – | 1 | – | 1 |
| North Carolina | 3 | – | 0 | – | 1 | 4 | – | 1 | – | 3 |
| Vanderbilt | 2 | – | 3 | – | 1 | 4 | – | 4 | – | 1 |
| Alabama | 1 | – | 3 | – | 0 | 2 | – | 3 | – | 0 |
| Nashville | 1 | – | 3 | – | 0 | 2 | – | 3 | – | 0 |
| Georgia | 1 | – | 4 | – | 0 | 2 | – | 4 | – | 0 |
| Tennessee | 0 | – | 2 | – | 1 | 3 | – | 2 | – | 1 |
| Cumberland (TN) | 0 | – | 1 | – | 0 | 0 | – | 1 | – | 0 |
| LSU | 0 | – | 1 | – | 0 | 2 | – | 2 | – | 0 |
| Kentucky State | 0 | – | 2 | – | 0 | 4 | – | 6 | – | 0 |
| Ole Miss | 0 | – | 3 | – | 0 | 0 | – | 3 | – | 0 |
| Georgia Tech | 0 | – | 3 | – | 0 | 0 | – | 4 | – | 0 |
$ – Conference champion

The 1900 LSU Tigers football team represented the LSU Tigers of Louisiana State University during the 1900 Southern Intercollegiate Athletic Association football season. After a year with coach John P. Gregg, the Tigers rehired Edmond Chavanne for the head coaching position at LSU football. The 1900 season featured two games against Millsaps, one at Tulane, and one against Louisiana State University alumni.

== Schedule ==
| Date | Opponent | Site | Result | Source |
|---|---|---|---|---|
| November 12 | Millsaps* | State Field; Baton Rouge, LA | W 70–0 | |
| November 17 | at Tulane | New Orleans, LA (Battle for the Rag) | L 0–29 | |
| November 29 | at Millsaps* | Jackson Fairgrounds; Jackson, MS | L 5–6 | |
| December 5 | LSU Alumni* | State Field; Baton Rouge, LA | W 10–0 | |
*Non-conference game

== Roster ==
| No. | Player | Position | Height | Weight | Hometown | High School |
|---|---|---|---|---|---|---|
| - | James E. Byram | Center | - | - | Bossier City, LA | - |
| - | John J. Coleman | Halfback | - | - | New Orleans, LA | - |
| - | George Fuchs | Guard | - | - | New Orleans, LA | - |
| - | Joseph M. Garland | Guard, Tackle | - | - | Opelousas, LA | - |
| - | Edwin S. Gorham | End | - | - | Lake Charles, LA | - |
| - | Field V. Gremillion | Tackle | - | - | - | - |
| - | Henry E. Landry | Fullback | - | - | Garyville, LA | - |
| - | Oswald W. McNeese | End | - | - | Lake Charles, LA | - |
| - | Eugene H. Mortimer | Halfback | - | - | Laurel, MS | - |
| - | Adam G. Mundinger | Tackle | - | - | Baton Rouge, LA | - |
| - | William T. Pegues | Tackle | - | - | Mansfield, LA | - |
| - | Henry James Rhodes | Guard | - | - | Vicksburg, MS | - |
| - | Ivan H. Schwing | Quarterback | - | - | Lake Charles, LA | - |

Roster from Fanbase.com and LSU: The Louisiana Tigers
