= 1900 Alabama Crimson White football team =

American college football season

1900 Alabama Crimson White football
- Conference: Southern Intercollegiate Athletic Association
- Record: 2–3 (1–3 SIAA)
- Head coach: Malcolm Griffin (1st season)
- Captain: Earl Drennen
- Home stadium: The Quad; North Birmingham Park

1900 Southern Intercollegiate Athletic Association football standings
	Conf.					Overall
Team	W		L		T	W		L		T
Clemson +	2	–	0	–	0	6	–	0	–	0
Auburn	4	–	0	–	0	4	–	0	–	0
Tulane	3	–	0	–	0	5	–	0	–	0
Texas	1	–	0	–	0	6	–	0	–	0
Sewanee +	5	–	0	–	1	6	–	1	–	1
North Carolina	3	–	0	–	1	4	–	1	–	3
Vanderbilt	2	–	3	–	1	4	–	4	–	1
Alabama	1	–	3	–	0	2	–	3	–	0
Nashville	1	–	3	–	0	2	–	3	–	0
Georgia	1	–	4	–	0	2	–	4	–	0
Tennessee	0	–	2	–	1	3	–	2	–	1
Cumberland (TN)	0	–	1	–	0	0	–	1	–	0
LSU	0	–	1	–	0	2	–	2	–	0
Kentucky State	0	–	2	–	0	4	–	6	–	0
Ole Miss	0	–	3	–	0	0	–	3	–	0
Georgia Tech	0	–	3	–	0	0	–	4	–	0
$ – Conference champion

The 1900 Alabama Crimson White football team (Note: Alabama football teams were not referred to as the "Crimson Tide" until the 1907 season. Prior to 1907, the team was called the "Crimson White" from 1893 to 1906 and the "Cadets" in 1892.) (variously "Alabama", "UA" or "Bama") represented the University of Alabama in the 1900 Southern Intercollegiate Athletic Association football season. The team was led by head coach Malcolm Griffin, in his first season, and played their home games at The Quad in Tuscaloosa and one game at North Birmingham Park in Birmingham, Alabama. In what was the eighth season of Alabama football, the team finished with a record of two wins and three losses (2–3, 1–3 SIAA).

The Crimson White opened the season with three consecutive games at The Quad. After a shutout victory over the Taylor School, Alabama opened SIAA play with a 12–5 victory over Ole Miss. However, the Crimson White did proceed to lose their final three games en route to a 2–3 record. After a 6–0 loss to Tulane, Alabama traveled to Montgomery where they were defeated 53–5 by Auburn and closed the season with a 35–0 loss to Clemson at Birmingham.

== Schedule ==
Date	Opponent	Site	Result	Source
October 21	Taylor School*	The Quad; Tuscaloosa, AL	W 23–0	
October 26	Ole Miss	The Quad; Tuscaloosa, AL (rivalry)	W 12–5	
November 3	Tulane	The Quad; Tuscaloosa, AL	L 0–6	
November 17	vs. Auburn	Riverside Park; Montgomery, AL (rivalry)	L 5–53	
November 29	Clemson	North Birmingham Park; Birmingham, AL (rivalry)	L 0–35	
*Non-conference game

- Scoring note: (Note: For the 1900 season, point values were different from those used in contemporary games. In 1900 a touchdown was worth five points, a field goal was worth five points and an extra point (PAT) was worth one point.)

== Game summaries ==
=== Taylor School ===
Alabama opened the season against the Taylor School, a preparatory school in Birmingham and defeated them 23–0. In the victory, A. M. Donahoo scored two and both James Forman and Arthur Walter Stewart each scored one touchdown in this shutout victory.

=== Ole Miss ===
Alabama opened SIAA play with a 12–5 victory over the University of Mississippi. Alabama scored first on a short Earl Drennen touchdown run, and with the successful PAT took a 6–0 lead. Mississippi responded with their only touchdown of the game shortly before the half on a short run to make the score 6–5 after a failed PAT. Arthur Walter Stewart then scored the final points of the game late in the second half on a short run to make the final score 12–5.

=== Tulane ===
Against the Greenies of Tulane University, Alabama lost 6–0 with the only points of the game coming on a one-yard Ellis Stearns touchdown run.

=== Auburn ===
In what was their first meeting since the 1895 season, the Alabama Polytechnic Institute (now known as Auburn University) defeated Alabama 53–5 at Montgomery's Riverside Park. Auburn took a 24–0 lead in the first half on touchdown runs of six-yards from Thomas, 75-yards from F. R. Yarbrough and seven and eight-yards from W. L. Noll. Alabama then scored their only points of the game on a two-yard C. M. Plowman run to make the score 24–5 at the half. Auburn then scored five second half touchdown on runs of seven and eight-yards from Yarbrough, 55-yards from Noll, three-yards from Blevens and on a 25-yard Sloan punt return.

=== Clemson ===
Clemson at Alabama

Team	1	2	Total
• Clemson	23	12	35
Alabama	0	0	0

- Date: November 29
- Location: North Birmingham Park
  Birmingham, Alabama

In the first all-time game against Clemson University, Alabama lost 35–0 on Thanksgiving Day at Birmingham's North Birmingham Park. After the Tigers forced an Alabama punt to open the game, Claude Douthit scored three consecutive touchdowns for Clemson en route to an 18–0 lead. Douthit scored first on a five-yard run, next on a short reception and finally on a second short touchdown run. N. M. Hunter then scored for Clemson on a ling run just before the break and made the halftime score 23–0. In the second half, the Tigers extended their lead to 35–0 behind a long Jim Lynah touchdown run and Douthit's fourth score of the day on a short run. With approximately 4:00 left in the game, captains from both Alabama and Clemson agreed to end the game early due to an unruly crowd and impending darkness.

== Players ==
Alabama Crimson White 1900 roster
Guards: Carl Abercrombie Brown; R. H. Dudley; Tackles: A. M. Donahoo; David Dare Patton	Center: James Lafayette Davidson; Ends: Frederick Grist Stickney; James Napoleon Granade	Backs: Earl Drennen; James Forman; C. M. Plowman; A. W. Stewart	Substitutes: Clarence Ballard; F. F. Blair; Aubrey Boyles; John Lancaster; Frank Montague Lett; Frank Houston Powe; M. P. Walker; A. W. Wellborn
