= E. E. Jones =

American football coach

Biographical details
- Born: September 12, 1870; Coaldale, Pennsylvania, U.S.
- Died: February 8, 1932 (aged 61); Sayre, Pennsylvania, U.S.
- Education: Princeton University

Coaching career (HC unless noted)
- 1900: Georgia

Head coaching record
- Overall: 2–4

Edmund Evans Jones (September 12, 1870 – February 8, 1932) was an American college football coach and attorney. He served as the head coach at the University of Georgia for one year in 1900, compiling a record of 2–4. Jones was the first of two head coaches to come to Georgia from Princeton University. Only three outside schools have provided Georgia with more than one head coach in football: Princeton (Jones and William A. Reynolds), Cornell University (Pop Warner and Gordon Saussy), and Brown University (Charles McCarthy, James Coulter, and Frank Dobson).

Jones was born in Coaldale, Pennsylvania and attended Princeton. He later worked as an assistant district attorney and was a member of Luzerne County, Pennsylvania's bar association.

== Head coaching record ==
Year	Team	Overall	Conference	Standing	Bowl/playoffs
Georgia Bulldogs (Southern Intercollegiate Athletic Association) (1900)
1900	Georgia	2–4	1–4		
Georgia:		2–4	1–4		
Total:		2–4			
