= Frank M. Osborne =

American football player, coach, and reverend (1879–1956)

Biographical details
- Born: January 29, 1879; Fletcher, North Carolina, U.S.
- Died: November 16, 1956 (aged 77); Pinehurst, North Carolina, U.S.

Playing career
- 1898–1900: North Carolina
- 1902: Sewanee
- Positions: End, quarterback

Coaching career (HC unless noted)
- 1903: Sewanee (assistant)
- 1915: Sewanee (assistant)

Accomplishments and honors

Awards
- All-Southern (1900, 1902)

Francis Moore "Farmer" Osborne (January 29, 1879 – November 16, 1956) was a college football player and coach as well as a reverend; once chaplain for Sewanee: The University of the South.

== University of North Carolina ==
He was a prominent end for coach William A. Reynolds's North Carolina Tar Heels football teams of the University of North Carolina from 1898 to 1900.

=== 1898 ===
Osborne was a member of the 1898 team, the school's only undefeated team and the conference champion.

=== 1900 ===
He was captain of the 1900 team. Osborne was selected All-Southern.

== Sewanee ==
He was the quarterback for the Sewanee Tigers in 1902, selected All-Southern. He then helped coach the team and taught at Sewanee for many years.

== Reverend ==
He was rector of the Cavalry Episcopal church of Pittsburgh.
