= J. A. Pierce =

American football coach (1874–1956)

Biographical details
- Born: August 31, 1874; Jefferson Hills, Pennsylvania, U.S.
- Died: June 23, 1956 (aged 81); McKeesport, Pennsylvania, U.S.

Coaching career (HC unless noted)
- 1899–1900: Tennessee

Head coaching record
- Overall: 9–4–1

Joseph Audley Pierce (August 31, 1874 – June 23, 1956) was an American football coach. He was the first head football coach at the University of Tennessee, serving from 1899 to 1900 and compiling a record of 9–4–1. Pierce was an alumnus of Lafayette College. During the 1920s, Pierce coached at Corsicana High School in Corsicana, Texas.

Pierce died in 1956 and was buried in Homewood Cemetery in Pittsburgh, Pennsylvania.

== Head coaching record ==
Year	Team	Overall	Conference	Standing	Bowl/playoffs
Tennessee Volunteers (Southern Intercollegiate Athletic Association) (1899–1900)
1899	Tennessee	6–2	2–1	T–4th	
1900	Tennessee	3–2–1	0–2–1	10th	
Tennessee:		9–4–1	2–3–1		
Total:		9–4–1			
