= Buster Hunter =

American college football player

Profile
- Position: Running back

Personal information
- Born: July 3, 1881; Pendleton, South Carolina
- Died: April 3, 1964

Career information
- College: Clemson (1900)

Miles Norton "Buster" Hunter (July 3, 1881 – April 3, 1964) was a college football player for the Clemson Tigers. In 1915, John Heisman selected the 30 best Southern football players, and mentioned Hunter sixth.
