= Malcolm Griffin (American football) =

American football player and coach (1877–1948)

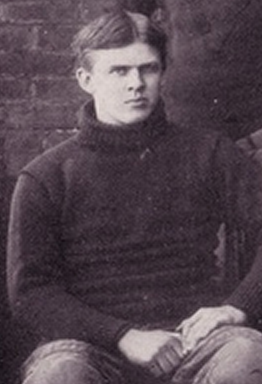
- Malcolm Griffin in the 1899 Virginia Cavaliers football team photo

Biographical details
- Born: July 9, 1877; Liberty, Bedford County, Virginia, U.S.
- Died: October 18, 1948 (aged 71); Bedford County, Virginia, U.S.
- Education: University of Virginia (1900)

Playing career
- 1898–1899: Virginia

Coaching career (HC unless noted)
- 1900: Alabama

Head coaching record
- Overall: 2–3

Malcolm Griffin (July 9, 1877 – October 18, 1948) was an American college football player and coach. He served as the head football coach at the University of Alabama in 1900, compiling a record of 2–3. He married Maria Washington Tucker in 1914. He was later a fruit grower in Bedford County.

== Head coaching record ==
| Year | Team | Overall | Conference | Standing | Bowl/playoffs |
|---|---|---|---|---|---|
Alabama Crimson White (Southern Intercollegiate Athletic Association) (1900)
| 1900 | Alabama | 2–3 | 1–3 | | |
| Alabama: | | 2–3 | 1–3 | | |
| Total: | | 2–3 | | | |
