= James L. Crane =

American football coach (1877–1942)

Biographical details
- Born: July 28, 1877; Mount Sterling, Illinois, U.S.
- Died: September 2, 1942 (aged 65); Humberstone, Ontario, Canada

Playing career
- c. 1895: Knox
- 1897–1898: Princeton
- Positions: Tackle, fullback, end

Coaching career (HC unless noted)
- 1899–1900: Vanderbilt

Head coaching record
- Overall: 11–6–1

James Lowrie Crane (July 28, 1877 – September 2, 1942) was an American college football coach, lawyer, lumber businessman, and city councilman in Buffalo, New York. He was the sixth head football coach at Vanderbilt University, serving for two seasons, from 1899 to 1900, and compiling a record of 11–6–1. Crane attended Knox College in Galesburg, Illinois, where the played football as a tackle and fullback. He then moved on to Princeton University, where he was a substitute end in 1897 and 1898.

Crane was born on July 28, 1877, in Mount Sterling, Illinois. He graduated from Harvard Law School in 1902 and moved that year to Buffalo, where he joined the law office of Wilson S. Bissell. He later worked for the law firm of Lockwood, Hoyt & Green and then became secretary of White, Gatwick, Mitchell, a lumber dealer in North Tonawanda, New York. Crane was active in the Republican Party and served on the Buffalo Common Council, representing the Delaware District from 1938 to 1941. He died on September 2, 1942, at his summer home in Lorraine, then a part of Humberstone and now Port Colborne, Ontario, Canada.

== Head coaching record ==
Year	Team	Overall	Conference	Standing	Bowl/playoffs
Vanderbilt Commodores (Southern Intercollegiate Athletic Association) (1899–1900)
1899	Vanderbilt	7–2	4–0	2nd	
1900	Vanderbilt	4–4–1	2–3–1	8th	
Vanderbilt:		11–6–1	6–3–1		
Total:		11–6–1			
