= Harris T. Collier =

American football coach (1876–1935)

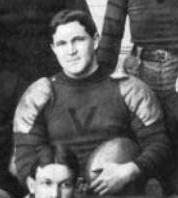
- Collier as Virginia team captain in 1898

Biographical details
- Born: May 28, 1876; McKenzie, Tennessee, U.S.
- Died: May 4, 1935 (aged 58); McKenzie, Tennessee, U.S.

Playing career

Football
- 1895: North Carolina
- 1896–1898: Virginia
- Positions: Tackle (football); Pitcher, right fielder (baseball)

Coaching career (HC unless noted)

Football
- 1899: Tulane
- 1900: Georgia Tech

Head coaching record
- Overall: 0–10–1

Harris Taylor "Pop" Collier (May 28, 1876 – May 4, 1935) was an American college football coach. He served as the head coach for Tulane (1899) and Georgia Tech (1900). Collier attended the University of Virginia, where he played on the football team and served as the team captain in 1898.

== Biography ==
A native of McKenzie, Tennessee, Collier attended the University of North Carolina at Chapel Hill. He played on the football team in 1895 as a guard. He also played on the baseball team as a right fielder and pitcher. Collier then attended the University of Virginia, where he studied medicine. He played on the baseball team, and from 1896 to 1898, on the football team. According to a fraternity newsletter, he was considered "one of the best tackles Virginia has ever had." Collier held the position of football team captain in 1898. The yearbook, Corks and Curls ranked him as the best "all-around athlete". At Virginia, he was the vice president of the Tennessee Club.

Collier then attended the Tulane University School of Medicine from which he graduated in 1900. He was a member of Sigma Nu and Theta Nu Epsilon. While a medical student, Collier also coached the Tulane football team. The Olive and Blue scored no points and finished the season with a 0–6–1 record. Following his time at Tulane, Collier coached at Georgia Tech for the 1900 season, finishing 0-4-0.

Collier died at the age of 58 at his home on May 4, 1935, of a cerebral hemorrhage.

== Head coaching record ==
| Year | Team | Overall | Conference | Standing | Bowl/playoffs |
|---|---|---|---|---|---|
Tulane Olive and Blue (Southern Intercollegiate Athletic Association) (1899)
| 1899 | Tulane | 0–6–1 | 0–5 | T–15th | |
| Tulane: | | 0–6–1 | 0–5 | | |
Georgia Tech (Southern Intercollegiate Athletic Association) (1900)
| 1900 | Georgia Tech | 0–4 | 0–4 | T–13th | |
| Georgia Tech: | | 0–4 | 0–4 | | |
| Total: | | 0–10–1 | | | |
