= Walter H. Watkins =

American football player and coach (1878–1937)

Biographical details
- Born: February 23, 1878; Meridian, Mississippi, U.S.
- Died: April 6, 1937 (aged 59); Memphis, Tennessee, U.S.

Playing career

Football
- 1896–1899: Princeton

Coaching career (HC unless noted)

Football
- 1900: Auburn
- 1901–1902: Vanderbilt

Head coaching record
- Overall: 18–2–1

Accomplishments and honors

Championships
- 2 SIAA (1900, 1901)

Walter Hudson "Billy" Watkins (February 23, 1878 – April 6, 1937) was an American college football player and coach. He served as the head football coach at Auburn University in 1900, compiling a record of 4–0. He also coached the Vanderbilt Commodores for two seasons from 1901 to 1902, compiling a record of 14–2–1. Watkins attended Princeton University, where he was a prominent member of the baseball team and first substitute on the football team. He later worked as an attorney.

== Head coaching record ==
Year	Team	Overall	Conference	Standing	Bowl/playoffs
Auburn Tigers (Southern Intercollegiate Athletic Association) (1900)
1900	Auburn	4–0	3–0	T–1st	
Auburn:		4–0	3–0		
Vanderbilt Commodores (Southern Intercollegiate Athletic Association) (1901–1902)
1901	Vanderbilt	6–1–1	4–0	1st	
1902	Vanderbilt	8–1	5–1	T–2nd	
Vanderbilt:		14–2–1	9–1		
Total:		20–5–2			
