= 1900 VPI football team =

American college football season

1900 VPI football
- Conference: Independent
- Record: 3–3–1
- Head coach: Eugene Davis (1st season)
- Captain: John Brabson Huffard
- Home stadium: Sheib Field

1900 Southern college football independents records
	Conf.			Overall
Team	W	L	T	W		L		T
Baylor		–		3	–	0	–	0
Davidson		–		4	–	1	–	0
Centre		–		4	–	1	–	1
Virginia		–		7	–	2	–	1
Georgetown		–		5	–	1	–	3
VMI		–		4	–	1	–	2
Oklahoma		–		3	–	1	–	1
Kendall		–		2	–	1	–	0
Marshall		–		1	–	0	–	2
Navy		–		6	–	3	–	0
Arkansas		–		2	–	1	–	1
South Carolina		–		4	–	3	–	0
West Virginia		–		4	–	3	–	0
VPI		–		3	–	3	–	1
Texas A&M		–		2	–	2	–	1
Richmond		–		3	–	4	–	0
Maryland		–		3	–	4	–	1
Delaware		–		2	–	3	–	1
William & Mary		–		1	–	2	–	0
North Carolina A&M		–		1	–	5	–	0
Furman		–		0	–	2	–	1

The 1900 VPI football team represented Virginia Agricultural and Mechanical College and Polytechnic Institute in the 1900 college football season. The team was led by their head coach Eugene Davis and finished with a record of three wins, three losses, and one tie (3–3–1).

Hunter Carpenter used the alias "Walter Brown" because his father had forbidden him to play football. It was not until his father saw him play in a game in 1900 against Virginia Military Institute in Norfolk, Virginia did he approve.

== Schedule ==
Date	Time	Opponent	Site	Result	Attendance	Source
October 6	3:30 p.m.	St. Albans Lutheran Boys School	Sheib Field; Blacksburg, VA	W 23–0		
October 20	3:30 p.m.	at St. Albans Lutheran Boys School	Radford, VA	W 16–6		
October 26	3:00 p.m.	at North Carolina A&M	State Fairgrounds; Raleigh, NC	W 18–2	10,000	
October 27	3:45 p.m.	at North Carolina	Campus Athletic Field (II); Chapel Hill, NC	T 0–0		
November 14		at Virginia	Madison Hall Field; Charlottesville, VA (rivalry)	L 5–17		
November 24	4:00 p.m.	vs. Clemson	Latta Park; Charlotte, NC	L 5–12		
November 29	3:00 p.m.	vs. VMI	Athletic Park; Roanoke, VA (rivalry)	L 0–5	3,500-4,000	

=== Original schedule ===
The 1900 football schedule for VPI listed on October 7 in The Times was as follows:

- October 6 – St. Albans in Blacksburg, Virginia (played on this date)
- October 13 – Roanoke in Salem, Virginia (game was not played)
- October 20 – St. Albans in Radford, Virginia (played on this date)
- October 24 – North Carolina in Chapel Hill, North Carolina (game was moved to October 27)
- October 26 – North Carolina A&M in Raleigh, North Carolina (game was moved to October 25)
- November 3 – Richmond in Richmond, Virginia (game was not played)
- November 10 – Guilford in Blacksburg (game was not played)
- November 24 – Washington and Lee in Blacksburg (game was not played)
- November 29 – VMI in either Roanoke, Virginia (listed on the VPI schedule) or Norfolk, Virginia (listed on the VMI schedule) (played on this date in Roanoke). On October 30, VPI informed VMI that they refused to play in Norfolk. VMI offered to increase VPI's percentage of ticket sales or pay for travel expenses, but VPI declined and the game was called off temporarily. VMI eventually acceded to VPI's demands and moved the game to Roanoke.

According to the article, VPI also planned on scheduling games with Maryland and Tennessee, but neither game occurred. The Virginia game was initially scheduled to be played in Blacksburg, but was ultimately played in Charlottesville, Virginia.

On October 9, 1900 The Richmond Dispatch listed a different schedule. The differences were:

- The schedule listed October 13 as "open", instead of against Roanoke.
- The schedule correctly listed the North Carolina game on October 27, instead of October 24.
- The schedule listed the Virginia game for November 7 (this game was eventually played on November 14).
- The schedule listed a Tennessee game for November 14 that was "being arranged" (this game was not played).

According to the article, VPI also planned on pursuing games with Randolph–Macon, William & Mary, Georgetown, Hampden–Sydney, and Southern Business College. However, none of these games were scheduled.

== Before the season ==
The 1899 VPI football team compiled a 4–1 record and were led by James Morrison in his only season as head coach.

== Game summaries ==
=== St. Albans (first game) ===
St. Albans vs. VPI

Team	1	2	Total
St. Albans	0	0	0
• VPI	17	6	23

- Date: October 6, 1900
- Location: Sheib Field
  Blacksburg, VA
- Game start: 3:30 p.m.

VPI's first game of the season was a victory over St. Albans Lutheran Boys School at Sheib Field.

=== St. Albans (second game) ===
VPI at St. Albans

Team	1	2	Total
• VPI	6	10	16
St. Albans	6	0	6

- Date: October 20, 1900
- Location: Radford, VA
- Game start: 3:30 p.m.

=== North Carolina A&M ===
VPI at North Carolina A&M

Team	1	2	Total
• VPI	12	6	18
NC A&M	2	0	2

- Date: October 26, 1900
- Location: State Fairgrounds
  Raleigh, NC
- Game start: 3:00 p.m.
- Game attendance: 10,000
- Game weather: "pleasant"
- Referee: Perrin Busbee

The starting lineup for VPI was: Jewell (left end), Baird (left tackle), Carper (left guard), Steele (center), Abbott (right guard), Cox (right tackle), Carpenter (right end), DeCamps (quarterback), Huffard (left halfback), Ingles (right halfback), McCormick (fullback). The substitutes were: Beverley, Counselman and Moffett.

The starting lineup for North Carolina A&M was: McCanless (left end), Turner (left tackle), Bowden (left guard), Grimsley (center), Oliver Max Gardner (right guard), Wright (right tackle), John McKinnon (right end), Worth (quarterback), Lewis Lougee (left halfback), Welch (right halfback), Dalton (fullback). The substitutes were: Carpenter, Davis, Jesse Liles, Thompson and Wootten.

=== North Carolina ===
VPI at North Carolina

Team	1	2	Total
VPI	0	0	0
UNC	0	0	0

- Date: October 27, 1900
- Location: Campus Athletic Field (II)
  Chapel Hill, NC
- Game start: 3:45 p.m.
- Referee: Meade

The starting lineup for VPI was: Jewell (left end), Baird (left tackle), Carper (left guard), Steele (center), Abbott (right guard), Cox (right tackle), Carpenter (right end), DeCamps (quarterback), Huffard (left halfback), Ingles (right halfback), McCormick (fullback).

The starting lineup for North Carolina was: William Smathers (left end), Frank Foust (left tackle), Frank Rankin (left guard), Walter Council (center), Tod Brem (right guard), Frank Bennett (right tackle), Frank M. Osborne (right end), Metrah Makeley (quarterback), A. Ramsey Berkeley (left halfback), Jim MacRae (right halfback), Ernest Graves Sr. (fullback). The substitutes were: C. J. Ebbs.

=== Virginia ===
VPI at Virginia

Team	1	2	Total
VPI	5	0	5
• UVA	6	11	17

- Date: November 14, 1900
- Location: Madison Hall Field
  Charlottesville, VA
- Referee: H. D. Waters (UVA)

The starting lineup for VPI was: Jewell (left end), McCormick (left tackle), Carper (left guard), Steele (center), Cox (right guard), Abbott (right tackle), Moffett (right end), DeCamps (quarterback), Huffard (left halfback), Hardaway (right halfback), Carpenter (fullback).

The starting lineup for Virginia was: Alexis Hobson (left end), John Loyd (left tackle), Frank Harris (left guard), George Montgomery (center), Charles Haskel (right guard), Christie Benet (right tackle), James Bride (right end), Brodie Nalle (quarterback), Virginius Dabney (left halfback), Robert Coleman (right halfback), Bradley Walker (fullback). The substitutes were: William Choice and Mulford.

=== Clemson ===
Clemson vs. VPI

Team	1	2	Total
• Clemson	6	6	12
VPI	5	0	5

- Date: November 24, 1900
- Location: Latta Park
  Charlotte, NC
- Game start: 4:00 p.m.
- Referee: Beard

The starting lineup for VPI was: Jewell (left end), McCormick (left tackle), Carper (left guard), Steele (center), Abbott (right guard), Cox (right tackle), Moffett (right end), DeCamps (quarterback), Huffard (left halfback), Hardaway (right halfback), Carpenter (fullback).

The starting lineup for Clemson was: C. A. Bellows (left end), Joe Duckworth (left tackle), A. P. George (left guard), John Kinsler (center), Jack Woodward (right guard), Norman Walker (right tackle), James Lynah (right end), Gus Lewis (quarterback), William Forsythe (left halfback), M. N. Buster Hunter (right halfback), Claude Douthit (fullback).

=== VMI ===
The starting lineup for VPI was: Jewell (left end), McCormick (left tackle), Carper (left guard), Steele (center), Abbott (right guard), Cox (right tackle), Moffett (right end), DeCamps (quarterback), Huffard (left halfback), Hardaway (right halfback), Carpenter (fullback). The substitutes were: Beverly, Blair, Gill, Miles, Miller, Sayers, Styles and Ware.

The starting lineup for VMI was: Beverley Tucker (left end), George C. Marshall (left tackle), Ira Johnson (left guard), Jesse Wright (center), William Smiley (right guard), Earl Biscoe (right tackle), Jennings Wise (right end), Charles Roller (quarterback), Calvert McCabe (left halfback), Andrew Rawn (right halfback), Todd Kirk (fullback). The substitutes were: Ralph Claggett, Morgan Hudgins, Edward Johnson, Sydney Lee, Saint Julien Marshall, Edwin Martin, Marshall Milton and Victor Perry.

== Players ==
The following players were members of the 1900 football team according to the roster published in the 1901 and 1903 editions of The Bugle, the Virginia Tech yearbook.

VPI 1900 roster
Quarterback: Kit DeCamps; Guards: Alvin Lee Abbott; Robert William Carper; Tackles: W. F. Cox; Hub McCormick; Center: Joseph Clyde Steele	Ends: Lindsay Louin Jewell; William Stuart Moffett; Halfbacks: Edward Wood Hardaway; John Brabson Huffard (Capt.); Fullback: Hunter Carpenter	Substitutes: Robert Bland Beverley; John Counselman; David Franklin Gill; Sally Miles; Carter Clarke Osterbind; Anderson Howard Sayers; Joseph Clay Stiles

== Coaching and training staff ==
- Head coach: Eugene Davis
- Manager: Ferdinand Powell
- Assistant manager: John McCoy Sample
