= 1900 College Football All-Southern Team =

American college football team

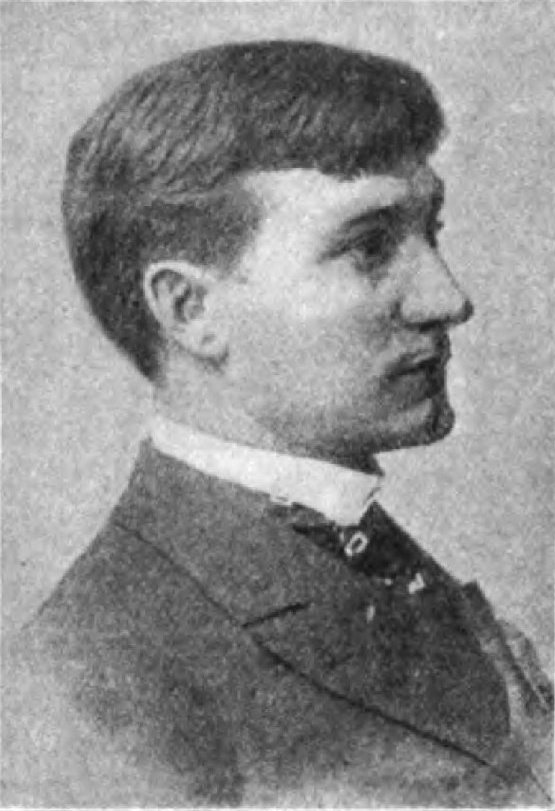
Caspar Whitney

The 1900 College Football All-Southern Team consists of American football players selected to the College Football All-Southern Teams selected by various organizations in 1900. Clemson won the SIAA championship. Most said Virginia ranked best in the south.

Caspar Whitney, the originator of the concept of the All-America team, selected an All-Southern eleven for Outing.

== All-Southerns of 1900 ==
=== Ends ===
- Alexis Hobson, Virginia (O)
- Frank M. Osborne, North Carolina (O)
- Johnny Finnegan, Georgetown (WH)
- Walter Schreiner, Texas (WH-s)
- Bledsoe, Washington & Lee (WH-s)

=== Tackles ===
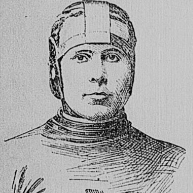
John Loyd.

- Frank Bennett†, North Carolina (O, WH)
- John Loyd, Virginia (O)
- George Marshall, VMI (Later Secretary of State) (WH)
- McCabe, VMI (WH-s)
- Wright, VMI (WH-s)

=== Guards ===
- William Choice, Virginia (O)
- Big Sam, Texas (O)
- W. F. Cox, VPI (WH)
- Branch Johnson, VMI (WH)
- L. L. Jewel, Virginia Tech (WH-s)
- Joe Lynch, Georgetown (WH-s)

=== Centers ===
- William Poole, Sewanee (O)
- Dan McKay, Georgetown (WH)
- Charles C. Haskel, Virginia (WH-s)

=== Quarterbacks ===
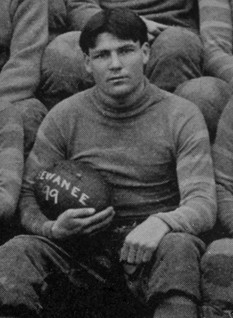
Henry Seibels.

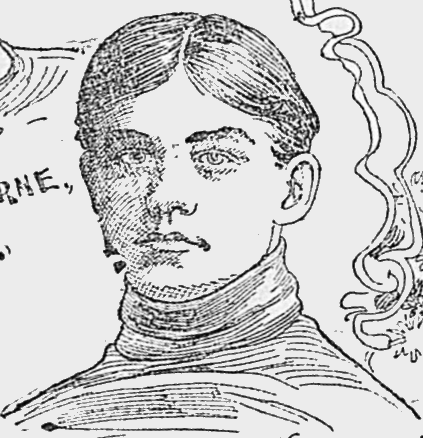
Ormond Simkins.

- Charles Roller, VMI (WH)
- Warbler Wilson, Sewanee (WH-s)
- Brodie Nalle, Virginia (WH-s)

=== Halfbacks ===
- Virginius Dabney†, Virginia (O, WH)
- Henry Seibels, Sewanee (College Football Hall of Fame) (O)
- Art Devlin, Georgetown (WH)
- Cheevers Barry, Georgetown (WH-s)
- Robert M. Coleman, Virginia (WH-s)

=== Fullbacks ===
- Ormond Simkins†, Sewanee (O, WH [as e])
- Bradley Walker, Virginia (WH)
- Hunter Carpenter, VPI (College Football Hall of Fame) (WH-s)

== Key ==
† = Unanimous selection

O = selected by Caspar Whitney in Outing. Whitney ruled Walker, Nalle, and Devlin ineligible

WH = selected by W. H. Hoge. It had substitutes, denoted with a small S. He picked "Walker" of Sewanee as a sub back, but must have meant Wilson.
