= Eugene Davis (doctor) =

American surgeon, football player, and coach (1870–1946)

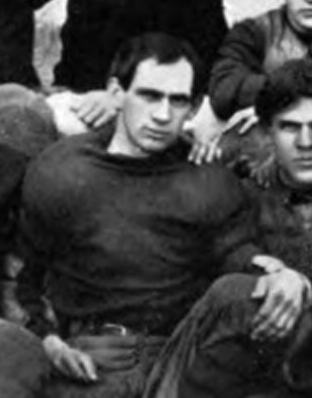
- Davis pictured on the 1895 Virginia Cavaliers football team photo

Biographical details
- Born: December 26, 1870; Charlottesville, Virginia, U.S.
- Died: January 14, 1946 (aged 75); New Orleans, Louisiana, U.S.
- Education: University of Virginia (1899)

Playing career
- 1895–1898: Virginia
- Position: Guard

Coaching career (HC unless noted)
- 1900: VPI

Head coaching record
- Overall: 3–3–1

Eugene Davis (December 26, 1870 – January 14, 1946) was an American surgeon and college football player and coach. He served as the head football coach at Virginia Agricultural and Mechanical College and Polytechnic Institute (VPI)—now known as Virginia Tech—for one season in 1900. Davis's team played only one home game that season, beating St. Albans by a score of 21–0. The rest of the schedule was played away. VPI won a rematch St. Albans, 16–6, beat North Carolina A&M, 18–2, played North Carolina to a scoreless tie in Chapel Hill, lost to the Virginia, 17–5, defeated Clemson in Charlotte, North Carolina, 12–5, and lost to their biggest rival at the time, VMI, 5–0.

Davis was born in Charlottesville in 1870 to D. C. T. and Mary Davis. Davis was a member of Phi Delta Theta. Around 1898, Davis was elected president of the general athletic association at the University of Virginia, described in an 1899 publication as "the highest honor within the gift of student body". He married Marguerite Sanders in 1910 in Wytheville. He also served as the first health commissioner of Charleston, West Virginia from 1906 to 1909. After practicing medicine in Pennsylvania, West Virginia and his home state of Virginia, Davis served in World War I as a surgeon and medic. He was honorably discharged.

He moved from Memphis, Tennessee, where he managed a Veterans' Administration hospital, to Fort Lyon Colorado in December 1931. In 1933, Davis was managing a Veterans Administration facility in Fort Lyon, Colorado. He had previously managed a Veterans' Administration hospital, also in Fort Lyons. At the time of the 1940 United States census, Davis and his family was living in Oak Park, Illinois, working at a "government hospital".

Davis died at a New Orleans hospital in 1946.

== Head coaching record ==
Year	Team	Overall	Conference	Standing	Bowl/playoffs
VPI (Independent) (1900–present)
1900	VPI	3–3–1			
VPI:		3–3–1			
Total:		3–3–1			
