= Big Sam =

"Big Sam" is a nickname for:

- Big Sam (musician), New Orleans trombonist and leader of Big Sam's Funky Nation
- Sam Allardyce (born 1954), English football player and manager
- Big Sam (American football) (fl. 1899–1900), college football player
- Sam Thompson (1860–1922), baseball player
- Sam McDonald (1762–1802), an unusually tall Scottish soldier
- Sam Houston High School (Arlington, Texas), United States
