= 1900 Davidson football team =

American college football season

1900 Davidson football
- Conference: Independent
- Record: 4–1
- Head coach: John A. Brewin (1st season)
- Home stadium: Latta Park Baseball Field

1900 Southern college football independents records
	Conf.			Overall
Team	W	L	T	W		L		T
Baylor		–		3	–	0	–	0
Davidson		–		4	–	1	–	0
Centre		–		4	–	1	–	1
Virginia		–		7	–	2	–	1
Georgetown		–		5	–	1	–	3
VMI		–		4	–	1	–	2
Oklahoma		–		3	–	1	–	1
Kendall		–		2	–	1	–	0
Marshall		–		1	–	0	–	2
Navy		–		6	–	3	–	0
Arkansas		–		2	–	1	–	1
South Carolina		–		4	–	3	–	0
West Virginia		–		4	–	3	–	0
VPI		–		3	–	3	–	1
Texas A&M		–		2	–	2	–	1
Richmond		–		3	–	4	–	0
Maryland		–		3	–	4	–	1
Delaware		–		2	–	3	–	1
William & Mary		–		1	–	2	–	0
North Carolina A&M		–		1	–	5	–	0
Furman		–		0	–	2	–	1

The 1900 Davidson football team was an American football team that represented the Davidson College as an independent during the 1900 college football season. In their first year under head coach John A. Brewin, the team compiled a 4–1 record.

== Schedule ==
Date	Opponent	Site	Result	Source
October 7	Guilford	Davidson, NC	W 16–0	
October 19	at Clemson	Calhoun, SC	L 0–64	
November 12	vs. North Carolina A&M	Latta Park Baseball Field; Charlotte, NC	W 17–0	
November 22	vs. South Carolina	Latta Park Baseball Field; Charlotte, NC	W 5–0	
November 29	vs. Georgia Tech	Augusta, GA	W 38–6	
