= 1900 South Carolina Gamecocks football team =

American college football season

1900 South Carolina Gamecocks football
- Conference: Independent
- Record: 4–3
- Head coach: Irving O. Hunt (2nd season)
- Captain: T. J. Bell

1900 Southern college football independents records
	Conf.			Overall
Team	W	L	T	W		L		T
Baylor		–		3	–	0	–	0
Davidson		–		4	–	1	–	0
Centre		–		4	–	1	–	1
Virginia		–		7	–	2	–	1
Georgetown		–		5	–	1	–	3
VMI		–		4	–	1	–	2
Oklahoma		–		3	–	1	–	1
Kendall		–		2	–	1	–	0
Marshall		–		1	–	0	–	2
Navy		–		6	–	3	–	0
Arkansas		–		2	–	1	–	1
South Carolina		–		4	–	3	–	0
West Virginia		–		4	–	3	–	0
VPI		–		3	–	3	–	1
Texas A&M		–		2	–	2	–	1
Richmond		–		3	–	4	–	0
Maryland		–		3	–	4	–	1
Delaware		–		2	–	3	–	1
William & Mary		–		1	–	2	–	0
North Carolina A&M		–		1	–	5	–	0
Furman		–		0	–	2	–	1

The 1900 South Carolina Jaguars football team represented South Carolina College—now known as the University of South Carolina–as an independent during the 1900 college football season. Led by Irving O. Hunt in his second and final season as head coach, South Carolina compiled a record of 4–3.

== Schedule ==
Date	Opponent	Site	Result	Attendance	Source
October 20	at Georgia	Herty Field; Athens, GA (rivalry)	L 0–5		
October 25	Guilford	Columbia, SC	W 10–0		
November 1	Clemson	State Fairgrounds; Columbia, SC (rivalry)	L 0–51	5,000	
November 10	North Carolina A&M	Columbia, SC	W 12–0		
November 17	at Furman	Greenville, SC	W 27–0		
November 22	vs. Davidson	Latta Park Baseball Field; Charlotte, NC	L 0–5		
November 29	at North Carolina A&M	State Fairgrounds; Raleigh, NC	W 17–5		
