= 1900 North Carolina A&M Aggies football team =

American college football season

1900 North Carolina A&M Aggies football
- Conference: Independent
- Record: 1–5
- Head coach: John McKee (1st season)

1900 Southern college football independents records
	Conf.			Overall
Team	W	L	T	W		L		T
Baylor		–		3	–	0	–	0
Davidson		–		4	–	1	–	0
Centre		–		4	–	1	–	1
Virginia		–		7	–	2	–	1
Georgetown		–		5	–	1	–	3
VMI		–		4	–	1	–	2
Oklahoma		–		3	–	1	–	1
Kendall		–		2	–	1	–	0
Marshall		–		1	–	0	–	2
Navy		–		6	–	3	–	0
Arkansas		–		2	–	1	–	1
South Carolina		–		4	–	3	–	0
West Virginia		–		4	–	3	–	0
VPI		–		3	–	3	–	1
Texas A&M		–		2	–	2	–	1
Richmond		–		3	–	4	–	0
Maryland		–		3	–	4	–	1
Delaware		–		2	–	3	–	1
William & Mary		–		1	–	2	–	0
North Carolina A&M		–		1	–	5	–	0
Furman		–		0	–	2	–	1

The 1900 North Carolina A&M Aggies football team represented the North Carolina A&M Aggies of North Carolina College of Agriculture and Mechanic Arts (now known as North Carolina State University) during the 1900 college football season. In John McKee's first season as head coach, the Aggies lost to five opponents for the first time in program history, scored only 24 points, and allowed 74 points for the season.

== Schedule ==
Date	Opponent	Site	Result	Attendance	Source
October 10	at Guilford	Fairgrounds; Greensboro, NC	L 0–5		
October 11	at Oak Ridge Institute	Oak Ridge, NC	W 17–5		
October 26	VPI	State Fairgrounds; Raleigh, NC	L 2–18	10,000	
November 10	at South Carolina	College Park; Columbia, SC	L 0–12		
November 12	vs. Davidson	Latta Park Baseball Field; Charlotte, NC	L 0–17		
November 29	South Carolina	State Fairgrounds; Raleigh, NC	L 5–17		
