= 1900 Delaware football team =

American college football season

1900 Delaware football
- Conference: Independent
- Record: 2–3–1
- Head coach: Herbert Rice (4th season)
- Captain: Theodore Wolf

1900 Southern college football independents records
| | Conf. | | | Overall |
| Team | W | L | T | W | | L | | T |
|---|---|---|---|---|---|---|---|---|
| Baylor | | – | | 3 | – | 0 | – | 0 |
| Davidson | | – | | 4 | – | 1 | – | 0 |
| Centre | | – | | 4 | – | 1 | – | 1 |
| Virginia | | – | | 7 | – | 2 | – | 1 |
| Georgetown | | – | | 5 | – | 1 | – | 3 |
| VMI | | – | | 4 | – | 1 | – | 2 |
| Oklahoma | | – | | 3 | – | 1 | – | 1 |
| Kendall | | – | | 2 | – | 1 | – | 0 |
| Marshall | | – | | 1 | – | 0 | – | 2 |
| Navy | | – | | 6 | – | 3 | – | 0 |
| Arkansas | | – | | 2 | – | 1 | – | 1 |
| South Carolina | | – | | 4 | – | 3 | – | 0 |
| West Virginia | | – | | 4 | – | 3 | – | 0 |
| VPI | | – | | 3 | – | 3 | – | 1 |
| Texas A&M | | – | | 2 | – | 2 | – | 1 |
| Richmond | | – | | 3 | – | 4 | – | 0 |
| Maryland | | – | | 3 | – | 4 | – | 1 |
| Delaware | | – | | 2 | – | 3 | – | 1 |
| William & Mary | | – | | 1 | – | 2 | – | 0 |
| North Carolina A&M | | – | | 1 | – | 5 | – | 0 |
| Furman | | – | | 0 | – | 2 | – | 1 |

The 1900 Delaware football team represented Delaware College—now known as the University of Delaware–as an independent during the 1900 college football season. Led by fourth-year head coach Herbert Rice, Delaware compiled a record of 2–3–1.

== Schedule ==
| Date | Opponent | Site | Result | Source |
|---|---|---|---|---|
| October 6 | at Franklin & Marshall | Williamson Field; Lancaster, PA | L 10–28 | |
| October 13 | at Johns Hopkins | Union Park; Baltimore, MD | L 0–5 | |
| October 27 | at Pennsylvania Military | Chester, PA | W 17–0 | |
| November 7 | at Haverford | Haverford, PA | T 5–5 | |
| November 10 | at Ursinus | Collegeville, PA | L 0–12 | |
| November 29 | Hahnemann | Newark, DE | W 34–0 | |
