= Ed Kenna =

American baseball player, football coach, and newspaper editor (1877–1912)

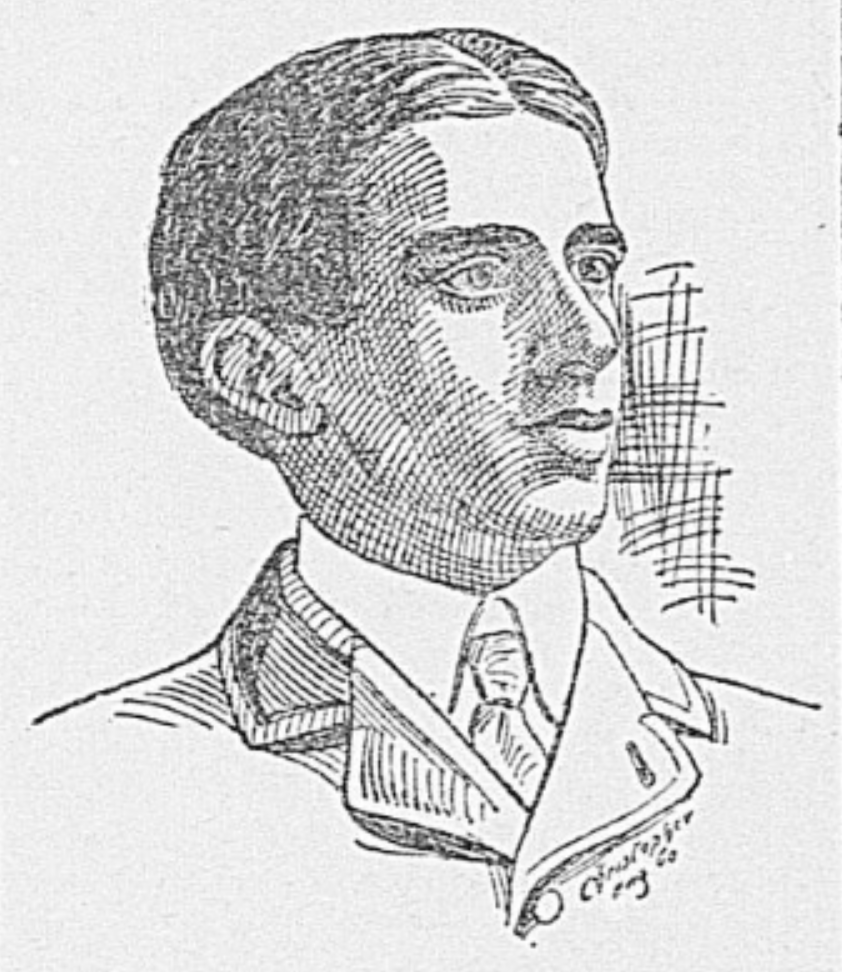
- Portrait of Kenna in The Richmond Dispatch, October 14, 1900
- Pitcher
- Born: October 17, 1877; Charleston, West Virginia, U.S.
- Died: March 22, 1912 (aged 34); Grant, Florida, U.S.
- Batted: Unknown Threw: Right

MLB debut
- May 5, 1902, for the Philadelphia Athletics

Last MLB appearance
- May 9, 1902, for the Philadelphia Athletics

MLB statistics
- Win–loss record: 1–1
- Strikeouts: 5
- Earned run average: 5.29
- Stats at Baseball Reference

Teams
- Philadelphia Athletics (1902)

Ed Kenna
Playing career
- 1898: Georgetown
- Position: Fullback

Coaching career (HC unless noted)
- 1900: Richmond
- 1902: West Virginia Wesleyan

Head coaching record
- Overall: 7–5–1

Edward Benninghaus Kenna (October 17, 1877 – March 22, 1912), nicknamed "the Pitching Poet", was an American Major League Baseball pitcher, college football coach and newspapers editor. He played for the Philadelphia Athletics during the 1902 season. Kenna played football at Georgetown University as a fullback in 1898 and at West Virginia University as a fullback and kicker in 1901. He served as the head football coach at Richmond College—now known as the University of Richmond—in 1900 and West Virginia Wesleyan College in 1902. Kenna was later an editor of the Charleston Gazette. He died on March 22, 1912, in Grant, Florida.

== Head coaching record ==
Year	Team	Overall	Conference	Standing	Bowl/playoffs
Richmond Spiders (Independent) (1900)
1900	Richmond	3–4			
Richmond:		3–4			
West Virginia Wesleyan Bobcats (Independent) (1902)
1902	West Virginia Wesleyan	4–1–1			
West Virginia Wesleyan:		4–1–1			
Total:		7–5–1			
