= 1900 Arkansas Cardinals football team =

American college football season

1900 Arkansas Cardinals football
- Conference: Independent
- Record: 2–1–1
- Head coach: Colbert Searles (2nd season)
- Captain: Ashton Vincenheller
- Home stadium: The Hill

1900 Southern college football independents records
	Conf.			Overall
Team	W	L	T	W		L		T
Baylor		–		3	–	0	–	0
Davidson		–		4	–	1	–	0
Centre		–		4	–	1	–	1
Virginia		–		7	–	2	–	1
Georgetown		–		5	–	1	–	3
VMI		–		4	–	1	–	2
Oklahoma		–		3	–	1	–	1
Kendall		–		2	–	1	–	0
Marshall		–		1	–	0	–	2
Navy		–		6	–	3	–	0
Arkansas		–		2	–	1	–	1
South Carolina		–		4	–	3	–	0
West Virginia		–		4	–	3	–	0
VPI		–		3	–	3	–	1
Texas A&M		–		2	–	2	–	1
Richmond		–		3	–	4	–	0
Maryland		–		3	–	4	–	1
Delaware		–		2	–	3	–	1
William & Mary		–		1	–	2	–	0
North Carolina A&M		–		1	–	5	–	0
Furman		–		0	–	2	–	1

The 1900 Arkansas Cardinals football team represented the University of Arkansas during the 1900 college football season. The Razorbacks played two intercollegiate football games and two games against high school teams. They compiled a 2–1–1 record (1–1 excluding high school games) and outscored their opponents by a combined total of 36 to 23.

Colbert Searles was the team's football coach in 1899 and 1900. He was a graduate of Wesleyan University and a professor of romance languages. In the summer of 1901, he left the University of Arkansas to accept a position as a professor at Stanford University.

== Schedule ==
Date	Opponent	Site	Result	Attendance	Source
October 20	Webb City High School	The Hill; Fayetteville, AR	W 15–0		
November 3	at Joplin Business College	Joplin, MO	T 6–6	3,000	
November 10	Pierce CC	The Hill; Fayetteville, AR	W 10–0		
November 17	at Drury	Springfield, MO	L 5–17		
