= John A. Brewin =

American collegiate sports coach (1876-1938)

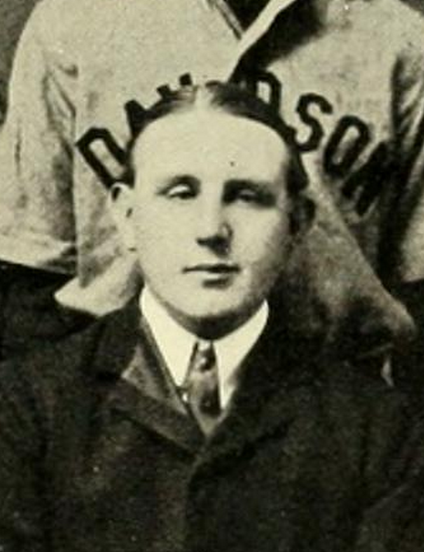
- Brewin pictured with the Davidson baseball team, c. 1903

Biographical details
- Born: December 9, 1876; Boston, Massachusetts, U.S.
- Died: March 7, 1938 (aged 61); Everett, Massachusetts, U.S.

Playing career

Football
- 1893–1896: Boston College

Coaching career (HC unless noted)

Football
- 1900–1903: Davidson

Baseball
- 1902–1905: Davidson

Administrative career (AD unless noted)
- 190?–190?: Davidson

Head coaching record
- Overall: 12–12–1 (football); 31–12 (baseball)

John Andrew Brewin (December 9, 1876 – March 7, 1938) was an American college football and college baseball coach for Davidson College in the early 1900s. He was the first official head coach for both teams in school history. Brewin also served as the Physical Director during his tenure at Davidson.

A native of Marlborough, Massachusetts, Brewin earned his medical degree from Davidson College in 1904. He had spent his undergraduate years at Boston College and lettered for the football team from 1893 to 1896, serving as team captain in 1895. He died in Everett, Massachusetts on March 7, 1938.

== Head coaching record ==
=== Football ===
Year	Team	Overall	Conference	Standing	Bowl/playoffs
Davidson (Independent) (1900–1903)
1900	Davidson	4–1			
1901	Davidson	4–2			
1902	Davidson	3–5–1			
1903	Davidson	1–4			
Davidson:		12–12–1			
Total:		12–12–1			

=== Baseball ===
Record table
Season	Team	Overall	Conference	Standing	Postseason
Davidson (Independent) (1902–1905)
1902	Davidson	7–1			
1903	Davidson	4–5			
1904	Davidson	10–3			
1905	Davidson	10–3			
Davidson:		31–12			
Total:		31–12			
