= John Ethan Hill =

American football coach and mathematician

Biographical details
- Born: October 15, 1865; Mystic, Connecticut, U.S.
- Died: July 2, 1941 (aged 75); Brooklyn, New York, U.S.
- Education: Yale University (1885); Clark University (1895, Ph.D)

Coaching career (HC unless noted)
- 1900: West Virginia

Head coaching record
- Overall: 4–3

John Ethan Hill (October 15, 1865 – July 2, 1941) was an American mathematician and college football coach. He was the eighth head football coach for West Virginia University in Morgantown, West Virginia, serving for one season, in 1900, and compiled a record of 4–3.

Hillwas born in Mystic, Connecticut, in 1865. He graduated from Yale University in 1885 and received a Doctor of Philosophy from Clark University. He died on July 2, 1941, at Brooklyn. He was buried at Elm Grove Cemetery in Mystic.

== Head coaching record ==
Year	Team	Overall	Conference	Standing	Bowl/playoffs
West Virginia Mountaineers (Independent) (1900)
1900	West Virginia	4–3			
West Virginia:		4–3			
Total:		4–3			
