= 1900 Texas A&M Aggies football team =

American college football season

1900 Texas A&M Aggies football
- Conference: Independent
- Record: 2–2–1
- Head coach: W. A. Murray (2nd season)

1900 Southern college football independents records
	Conf.			Overall
Team	W	L	T	W		L		T
Baylor		–		3	–	0	–	0
Davidson		–		4	–	1	–	0
Centre		–		4	–	1	–	1
Virginia		–		7	–	2	–	1
Georgetown		–		5	–	1	–	3
VMI		–		4	–	1	–	2
Oklahoma		–		3	–	1	–	1
Kendall		–		2	–	1	–	0
Marshall		–		1	–	0	–	2
Navy		–		6	–	3	–	0
Arkansas		–		2	–	1	–	1
South Carolina		–		4	–	3	–	0
West Virginia		–		4	–	3	–	0
VPI		–		3	–	3	–	1
Texas A&M		–		2	–	2	–	1
Richmond		–		3	–	4	–	0
Maryland		–		3	–	4	–	1
Delaware		–		2	–	3	–	1
William & Mary		–		1	–	2	–	0
North Carolina A&M		–		1	–	5	–	0
Furman		–		0	–	2	–	1

The 1900 A&M Aggies football team represented the Agricultural and Mechanical College of Texas—now known as Texas A&M University—as an independent during the 1900 college football season. Led by second-year head coach W. A. Murray, the Aggies compiled a record of 2–2–1.

== Schedule ==
Date	Opponent	Site	Result	Source
October 19	Henry College (TX)	College Station, TX	W 44–0	
October 27	vs. Texas	San Antonio Fairgrounds; San Antonio, TX (rivalry)	L 0–5	
November 9	Waxahachie AC	Kernole Park; Bryan, TX	W 11–0	
November 22	Kansas City Medics	Kernole Park; Bryan, TX	T 6–6	
November 29	at Texas	Clark Field; Austin, TX	L 0–11	
