= 1900 Richmond Spiders football team =

American college football season

1900 Richmond Spiders football
- Conference: Independent
- Record: 3–4
- Head coach: Ed Kenna (1st season)
- Captain: B. West Tabb
- Home stadium: Broad Street Park

1900 Southern college football independents records
	Conf.			Overall
Team	W	L	T	W		L		T
Baylor		–		3	–	0	–	0
Davidson		–		4	–	1	–	0
Centre		–		4	–	1	–	1
Virginia		–		7	–	2	–	1
Georgetown		–		5	–	1	–	3
VMI		–		4	–	1	–	2
Oklahoma		–		3	–	1	–	1
Kendall		–		2	–	1	–	0
Marshall		–		1	–	0	–	2
Navy		–		6	–	3	–	0
Arkansas		–		2	–	1	–	1
South Carolina		–		4	–	3	–	0
West Virginia		–		4	–	3	–	0
VPI		–		3	–	3	–	1
Texas A&M		–		2	–	2	–	1
Richmond		–		3	–	4	–	0
Maryland		–		3	–	4	–	1
Delaware		–		2	–	3	–	1
William & Mary		–		1	–	2	–	0
North Carolina A&M		–		1	–	5	–	0
Furman		–		0	–	2	–	1

The 1900 Richmond Spiders football team was an American football team that represented Richmond College—now known as the University of Richmond—as an independent during the 1900 college football season. Led by Ed Kenna in his first and only year as head coach, Richmond compiled a record of 3–4.

== Schedule ==
Date	Time	Opponent	Site	Result	Source
October 10		at Virginia	Madison Hall Field; Charlottesville, VA	L 0–51	
October 15	4:00 p.m.	Randolph–Macon	Broad Street Park; Richmond, VA	W 5–0	
October 20		Fredericksburg College	Broad Street Park; Richmond, VA	W 11–0	
October 27	3:30 p.m.	Woodberry Forest	Broad Street Park; Richmond, VA	L 0–6	
October 31	4:00 p.m.	at Georgetown	Georgetown Field; Washington, DC	L 0–84	
November 12		at Randolph–Macon	Ashland, VA	W 11–6	
November 15	3:40 p.m.	Hampden–Sydney	Broad Street Park; Richmond, VA	L 0–34	
