= Harry Gerstle =

American football player and lumber dealer (1880–1929)

Profile
- Position: End/Halfback

Personal information
- Born: July 12, 1880; Chattanooga, Tennessee
- Died: December 9, 1929 (aged 49); Chattanooga, Tennessee

Career information
- College: Virginia

Awards and highlights
- All-Southern (1899)

Harry Lee "Hal" Gerstle (July 12, 1880 – December 9, 1929) was an American college football player and lumber dealer. He attended the Bingham Military School. Gerstle played for the Virginia Cavaliers football team. He scored the only points against Penn in 1899. He was a member of Delta Kappa Epsilon fraternity. He married Carrie Glenn Whiteside. He was secretary and treasurer of the Gerstle Medicine Co. in Chattanooga.
