= 1900 Baylor football team =

American college football season

1900 Baylor football
- Conference: Independent
- Record: 3–0
- Head coach: R. H. Hamilton (2nd season)
- Captain: Homer B. "Buck" Fisher

1900 Southern college football independents records
	Conf.			Overall
Team	W	L	T	W		L		T
Baylor		–		3	–	0	–	0
Davidson		–		4	–	1	–	0
Centre		–		4	–	1	–	1
Virginia		–		7	–	2	–	1
Georgetown		–		5	–	1	–	3
VMI		–		4	–	1	–	2
Oklahoma		–		3	–	1	–	1
Kendall		–		2	–	1	–	0
Marshall		–		1	–	0	–	2
Navy		–		6	–	3	–	0
Arkansas		–		2	–	1	–	1
South Carolina		–		4	–	3	–	0
West Virginia		–		4	–	3	–	0
VPI		–		3	–	3	–	1
Texas A&M		–		2	–	2	–	1
Richmond		–		3	–	4	–	0
Maryland		–		3	–	4	–	1
Delaware		–		2	–	3	–	1
William & Mary		–		1	–	2	–	0
North Carolina A&M		–		1	–	5	–	0
Furman		–		0	–	2	–	1

The 1900 Baylor football team was an American football team that represented Baylor University as an independent during the 1900 college football season. This was the second football season for Baylor. Under head coach R. H. Hamilton, the team played all of its games at home in Waco, Texas, and finished the season undefeated at 3–0.

== Schedule ==
Date	Time	Opponent	Site	Result	Source
November 3	3:00 p.m.	at Austin	Batshell's Park; Sherman, TX	W 11–6	
November 17	3:30 p.m.	Trinity (TX)	West End Park; Waco, TX	W 17–0	
November 29		Weatherford	Waco, TX	W 16–0	
