= 1900 Maryland Aggies football team =

American college football season

1900 Maryland Aggies football
- Conference: Independent
- Record: 3–4–1
- Head coach: F. H. Peters (1st season)
- Home stadium: Maryland Agricultural College Field

1900 Southern college football independents records
	Conf.			Overall
Team	W	L	T	W		L		T
Baylor		–		3	–	0	–	0
Davidson		–		4	–	1	–	0
Centre		–		4	–	1	–	1
Virginia		–		7	–	2	–	1
Georgetown		–		5	–	1	–	3
VMI		–		4	–	1	–	2
Oklahoma		–		3	–	1	–	1
Kendall		–		2	–	1	–	0
Marshall		–		1	–	0	–	2
Navy		–		6	–	3	–	0
Arkansas		–		2	–	1	–	1
South Carolina		–		4	–	3	–	0
West Virginia		–		4	–	3	–	0
VPI		–		3	–	3	–	1
Texas A&M		–		2	–	2	–	1
Richmond		–		3	–	4	–	0
Maryland		–		3	–	4	–	1
Delaware		–		2	–	3	–	1
William & Mary		–		1	–	2	–	0
North Carolina A&M		–		1	–	5	–	0
Furman		–		0	–	2	–	1

The 1900 Maryland Aggies football team represented Maryland Agricultural College (later part of the University of Maryland) in the 1900 college football season. In their first and only season under head coach F. H. Peters, the Aggies compiled a 3–4–1 record and outscored their opponents, 68 to 67. The team did not play any intercollegiate football games in 1900, with all eight games being played against local high schools, preparatory schools, an athletic club, and Charlotte Hall Military Academy.

== Schedule ==
Date	Opponent	Site	Result	Attendance	Source
October 12	Washington Western High School	College Park, MD	T 0–0		
October 20	Gibraltar Athletic Club	College Park, MD	L 0–17		
October 24	Georgetown Prep School	College Park, MD	L 0–5		
October 30	Alexandria Episcopal High School	College Park, MD	L 6–34		
November 12	Georgetown Prep School	College Park, MD	W 15–0		
November 13	Washington Gonzaga High School	College Park, MD	L 5–11		
November 24	Washington Gonzaga High School	College Park, MD	W 21–0		
November 29	Charlotte Hall Military Academy	College Park, MD	W 21–0		
