= 1900 West Virginia Mountaineers football team =

American college football season

1900 West Virginia Mountaineers football
- Conference: Independent
- Record: 4–3
- Head coach: John Ethan Hill (1st season)
- Captain: Roscoe C. Brown

1900 Southern college football independents records
	Conf.			Overall
Team	W	L	T	W		L		T
Baylor		–		3	–	0	–	0
Davidson		–		4	–	1	–	0
Centre		–		4	–	1	–	1
Virginia		–		7	–	2	–	1
Georgetown		–		5	–	1	–	3
VMI		–		4	–	1	–	2
Oklahoma		–		3	–	1	–	1
Kendall		–		2	–	1	–	0
Marshall		–		1	–	0	–	2
Navy		–		6	–	3	–	0
Arkansas		–		2	–	1	–	1
South Carolina		–		4	–	3	–	0
West Virginia		–		4	–	3	–	0
VPI		–		3	–	3	–	1
Texas A&M		–		2	–	2	–	1
Richmond		–		3	–	4	–	0
Maryland		–		3	–	4	–	1
Delaware		–		2	–	3	–	1
William & Mary		–		1	–	2	–	0
North Carolina A&M		–		1	–	5	–	0
Furman		–		0	–	2	–	1

The 1900 West Virginia Mountaineers football team was an American football team that represented West Virginia University as an independent during the 1900 college football season. In its first and only season under head coach John Ethan Hill, the team compiled a 4–3 record and was outscored by a total of 104 to 53. Roscoe C. Brown was the team captain.

== Schedule ==
Date	Opponent	Site	Result	Source
October 6	Western University of Pennsylvania	Morgantown, WV (rivalry)	W 6–5	
October 20	Monessen Independents	Morgantown, WV	W 24–6	
October 27	at Marietta	Marietta, OH	L 6–19	
November 3	at Ohio State	Ohio Field; Columbus, OH	L 0–27	
November 5	at Ohio Wesleyan	Delaware, OH	W 6–5	
November 10	at California Normal (PA)	California, PA	W 11–6	
November 17	at Washington & Jefferson	College Park; Washington, PA	L 0–36	
