= 1900 Navy Midshipmen football team =

American college football season

1900 Navy Midshipmen football
- Conference: Independent
- Record: 6–3
- Head coach: Garrett Cochran (1st season)
- Captain: Orie Fowler
- Home stadium: Worden Field

1900 Southern college football independents records
	Conf.			Overall
Team	W	L	T	W		L		T
Baylor		–		3	–	0	–	0
Davidson		–		4	–	1	–	0
Centre		–		4	–	1	–	1
Virginia		–		7	–	2	–	1
Georgetown		–		5	–	1	–	3
VMI		–		4	–	1	–	2
Oklahoma		–		3	–	1	–	1
Kendall		–		2	–	1	–	0
Marshall		–		1	–	0	–	2
Navy		–		6	–	3	–	0
Arkansas		–		2	–	1	–	1
South Carolina		–		4	–	3	–	0
West Virginia		–		4	–	3	–	0
VPI		–		3	–	3	–	1
Texas A&M		–		2	–	2	–	1
Richmond		–		3	–	4	–	0
Maryland		–		3	–	4	–	1
Delaware		–		2	–	3	–	1
William & Mary		–		1	–	2	–	0
North Carolina A&M		–		1	–	5	–	0
Furman		–		0	–	2	–	1

The 1900 Navy Midshipmen football team represented the United States Naval Academy during the 1900 college football season. Under first-year head coach Garrett Cochran, the team compiled a 6–3 record, outscored its opponents 106 to 51, and shut out five of its nine opponents.

== Schedule ==
Date	Time	Opponent	Site	Result	Source
October 6		University of Maryland, Baltimore	Worden Field; Annapolis, MD	W 6–0	
October 13		Princeton	Worden Field; Annapolis, MD	L 0–5	
October 20		Georgetown	Worden Field; Annapolis, MD	W 6–0	
October 24		Lehigh	Worden Field; Annapolis, MD	W 15–0	
November 3	2:45 p.m.	Washington & Jefferson	Worden Field; Annapolis, MD	W 18–0	
November 10		Penn State	Worden Field; Annapolis, MD	W 44–0	
November 17		Columbia	Worden Field; Annapolis, MD	L 0–11	
November 21		Penn	Worden Field; Annapolis, MD	L 6–28	
December 1		vs. Army	Franklin Field; Philadelphia, PA (Army–Navy Game)	W 11–7	
