= 1900 William & Mary Orange and White football team =

American college football season

1900 William & Mary Orange and White football
- Conference: Independent
- Record: 1–2
- Head coach: W. J. King (3rd season)
- Captain: F. S. McCandish

1900 Southern college football independents records
	Conf.			Overall
Team	W	L	T	W		L		T
Baylor		–		3	–	0	–	0
Davidson		–		4	–	1	–	0
Centre		–		4	–	1	–	1
Virginia		–		7	–	2	–	1
Georgetown		–		5	–	1	–	3
VMI		–		4	–	1	–	2
Oklahoma		–		3	–	1	–	1
Kendall		–		2	–	1	–	0
Marshall		–		1	–	0	–	2
Navy		–		6	–	3	–	0
Arkansas		–		2	–	1	–	1
South Carolina		–		4	–	3	–	0
West Virginia		–		4	–	3	–	0
VPI		–		3	–	3	–	1
Texas A&M		–		2	–	2	–	1
Richmond		–		3	–	4	–	0
Maryland		–		3	–	4	–	1
Delaware		–		2	–	3	–	1
William & Mary		–		1	–	2	–	0
North Carolina A&M		–		1	–	5	–	0
Furman		–		0	–	2	–	1

The 1900 William & Mary Orange and White football team represented William & Mary during the 1900 college football season. The team went 1–2, losing both of its conference games.

== Schedule ==
Date	Opponent	Site	Result
November 2	Newport News Athletic Club	Williamsburg, VA	W 5–0
November 3	Hampden–Sydney	Williamsburg, VA	L 0–17
November 24	at Randolph–Macon	Ashland, VA	L 0–11
