= 1900 Centre football team =

American college football season

1900 Centre football

State champion
- Conference: Independent
- Record: 4–1–1
- Head coach: Ralph C. Hamill (1st season)

1900 Southern college football independents records
	Conf.			Overall
Team	W	L	T	W		L		T
Baylor		–		3	–	0	–	0
Davidson		–		4	–	1	–	0
Centre		–		4	–	1	–	1
Virginia		–		7	–	2	–	1
Georgetown		–		5	–	1	–	3
VMI		–		4	–	1	–	2
Oklahoma		–		3	–	1	–	1
Kendall		–		2	–	1	–	0
Marshall		–		1	–	0	–	2
Navy		–		6	–	3	–	0
Arkansas		–		2	–	1	–	1
South Carolina		–		4	–	3	–	0
West Virginia		–		4	–	3	–	0
VPI		–		3	–	3	–	1
Texas A&M		–		2	–	2	–	1
Richmond		–		3	–	4	–	0
Maryland		–		3	–	4	–	1
Delaware		–		2	–	3	–	1
William & Mary		–		1	–	2	–	0
North Carolina A&M		–		1	–	5	–	0
Furman		–		0	–	2	–	1

The 1900 Centre football team represented Centre College as an independent in the 1900 college football season. Led by Ralph C. Hamill in his first and only season as head coach, Centre compiled a record of 4–1–1. The team outscored its opponents 54 to 17. The first game of the season, against Cincinnati, was cancelled after 15 minutes of play due to lightning.

== Schedule ==
Date	Opponent	Site	Result	Source
September 15	at Cincinnati	Union Ball Park; Cincinnati, OH	Cancelled	
October 13	Kentucky State College	Danville, KY (rivalry)	W 5–0	
October 22	at Miami (OH)	Miami Field; Oxford, OH	W 17–0	
October 27	at Vanderbilt	Dudley Field; Nashville, TN	W 11–0	
November 5	vs. Central (KY)	Lexington, KY	T 5–5	
November 10	Kentucky University	Danville, KY	W 11–0	
November 29	at Louisville YMCA	Louisville, KY	L 5–12	
