= 1899 College Football All-Southern Team =

American all-star college football team

The 1899 College Football All-Southern Team consists of American football players selected to the College Football All-Southern Teams selected by various organizations in 1899. The "Iron Men" of Sewanee won the SIAA championship. The Vanderbilt Hustler remarked on Suter's selection of 9 of his own players, "Only nine! He surely must have been thinking of a baseball team."

== All-Southerns of 1899 ==
=== Ends ===
- Bart Sims, Sewanee (O, HMS-s)
- Herman Koehler, North Carolina (O)
- Walter Schreiner, Texas (HMS)
- Walter Simmons, Vanderbilt (HMS)
- John F. H. Barbee, Vanderbilt (HMS-s)

=== Tackles ===
- W. Hamilton†, Georgia (O, HMS [as g])
- John Loyd, Virginia (O)
- Deacon Jones, Sewanee (HMS)
- Richard Bolling, Sewanee (HMS)
- Andrew Ritchie, Georgia (HMS-s)
- James Hart, Texas (HMS-s)

=== Guards ===
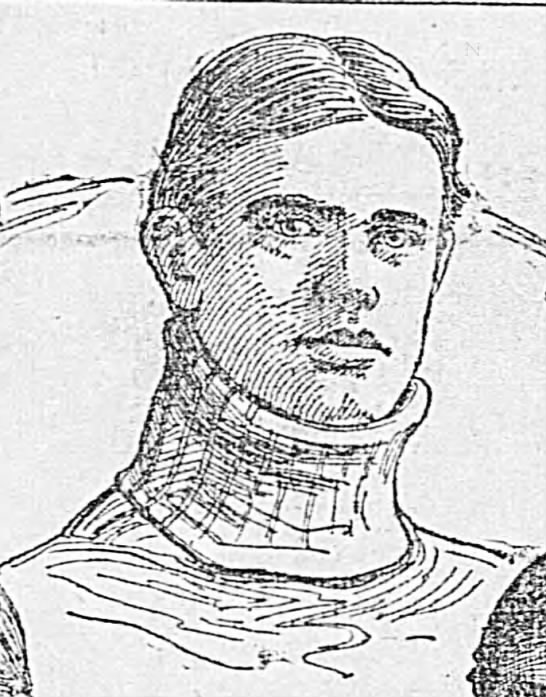
Wild Bill Claiborne.

- William Choice, VPI (O)
- Wild Bill Claiborne, Sewanee (HMS)
- Wallace Crutchfield, Vanderbilt (O)
- William H. Newman, Tennessee (HMS-s)

=== Centers ===
- Carlos A. Long, Georgetown (O)
- William Poole, Sewanee (HMS)
- Edward Overshiner, Texas (HMS-s)

=== Quarterbacks ===
- Warbler Wilson†, Sewanee (O, HMS)
- Semp Russ, Texas (HMS-s)
- Ed Huguley, Auburn (HMS-s)

=== Halfbacks ===
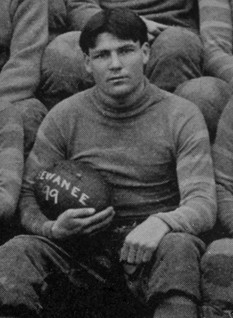
Henry Seibels.

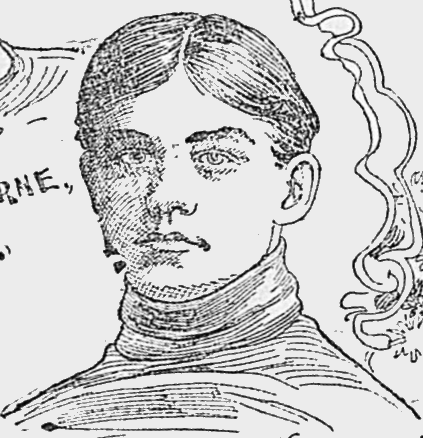
Ormond Simkins.

- Arthur Feagin, Auburn (O, HMS-s)
- Henry Seibels, Sewanee (College Football Hall of Fame) (HMS)
- Harry Gerstle, Virginia (O)
- Rex Kilpatrick, Sewanee (HMS)
- Orvill Burke, Vanderbilt (HMS-s)
- Lawrence Levert, Tulane (HMS-s)
- Quintard Gray, Sewanee (HMS-s)
- Franklin Bivings, Auburn (HMS-s)

=== Fullbacks ===
- Ormond Simkins, Sewanee (HMS)
- Robert M. Coleman, Virginia (O)
- John H. McIntosh, Georgia (HMS-s)
- Raymond Keller, Texas (HMS-s)
- Charles L. Eshleman, Tulane (HMS-s)

== Key ==
† = Unanimous selection

O = selected by W. A. Lambeth in Outing.

HMS = selected by H. M. Suter, head coach at Sewanee: The University of the South. It had substitutes, denoted by a small S.
