= George Livingstone (golfer) =

Golfer and clubmaker(1880–1968)

Personal information
- Full name: George Wylie Alexander Livingstone
- Born: December 14, 1880 North Berwick, Scotland
- Died: December 17, 1968 (aged 88) Nashville, Tennessee, US
- Spouse: Catherine P. Clarkson
- Children: 4

Career
- Sport: Golf
- Status: Professional

George Wylie Alexander Livingstone (December 14, 1880 – December 17, 1968) was a Scottish golf professional who emigrated to the U.S. in 1912. He is best known for breaking Bobby Jones' world record for 36 consecutive holes of tournament play in 1926 at the Southeastern PGA Tournament with a 67–66. Livingstone left his home in North Berwick, Scotland, at age 31 (1912) to come to the United States, hoping to capitalize on golf's explosive popularity there. He was undoubtedly influenced by the success of several of his boyhood golfing companions from North Berwick, including Willie Anderson and Fred McLeod, who had each won the U.S. Open.

After arriving in New York, he fortuitously found an opening at a rising country club in Tennessee; sportswriter Grantland Rice was asked by them to interview him and report back. Livingstone was hired and kept the position as head pro at Nashville's Belle Meade Country Club for 35 years (1912–1947). Known for his thick Scottish brogue and sometimes brusk manner, he exerted a major influence in golf organizations in the South by establishing standards of how tournaments were run. He organized many golf exhibition matches to benefit charities. Livingstone was inducted into the Tennessee Sports Hall of Fame. Today, an honorary golf "Heritage Trail" is mapped out through North Berwick, with a plaque at the site where Livingstone was born.

== Early life ==
Livingstone (pronounced Livings-tun) was born on December 14, 1880, in North Berwick, Scotland. It is a small costal town on the south shore of the Firth of Forth (an estuary of the River Forth), about 25 miles east of Edinburgh. Golf had been played at that site as far back as 1798. (Note: This is proven by court records of a man arrested on that date for the crime of playing golf on Sunday.) His father, James Livingstone, was a fisherman and seasonal golf caddie. His mother was Mary Taylor, from Buckhaven, another costal town just north. The Livingstones' living quarters were adjacent to a golf course. "The holes ran past my front yard...I guess I was about three years old the first time I had a [Golf] stick in my hand", Livingston said. The rent was low in their tenement; it had no electricity or gas. A row of George's hand-made golf balls hardening on the window sills was a frequent sight. He had three brothers, two of whom became golf professionals in the U.S.: Jimmy Livingstone at Ingleside in Atlanta; Henry Livingstone at Clarksville, Tennessee. The third brother was John Livingstone, the eldest, who remained in Stirlingshire, Scotland, in the grocery business.

North Berwick became a fashionable holiday resort in the late nineteenth century thanks to two scenic sandy bays with golf courses at the end of each. These were true links courses: a costal location laid out on a raised beach of brown sand. Robert Louis Stevenson spent many holidays there in his childhood. The British Prime Minister, Arthur James Balfour, was a regular visitor to North Berwick in the late 1880s. For years, Balfour came there for a month each September and played golf almost every day.

Livingstone attended the Public School in North Berwick, and grew up playing golf from dawn to dusk when possible. The school's headmaster was George Tait, an avid golfer himself, who happened to be captain of the town's Bass Rock Golf Club at the time. Livingstone left school at age 14 to take an apprenticeship in joinery. One of his teenage playing companions (Note: Three of his best friends in North Berwick became noted golfers in the U.S.: Willie Anderson became a four-time U.S. Open Champion; Fred McLeod was a U.S. Open Champion; Jack Souter became a golf pro at Tuxedo Country Club in New York.) was Willie Anderson, who was 18 months his senior. Anderson left for America, landed a job as a golf pro in Rhode Island, and finished second in the U.S. Open. At that time, Livingstone, for an unknown reason, did not duplicate his friend’s path to the United States. Instead, in 1901, he enlisted in the Scottish military, the Argyll and Sutherland Highlanders, to serve in South Africa in the Second Boer War; however, when he arrived, the war was almost over. He stayed on for another year to do construction work. On his return, he married Catherine P. Clarkson, and they had three daughters, Grace, Mary and Isabella. They would later have a son, James, born in the United States.

With a handicap of +4, (Note: A player who is a +4 handicap will shoot a score around 68 strokes for the same par-72 golf course, or 4-under par.) Livingstone won many local golf championships. Nevertheless, golf historians believe he may have missed a golden opportunity in the United States by waiting from 1902 to 1912 to leave Scotland. Douglas Seaton, Bass Rock Golf Club Historian said, "During the period 1904-1910, George Livingstone was the best player in the club... if George had emigrated in 1902 instead of enlisting in the army— his name would have been engraved on the U.S. Open trophy.”

Competing in the 1909 British Amateur Tournament at Muirfield, Livingstone experienced what he always called “my greatest day in golf". On the morning of the tournament, he mounted his bicycle with his golf bag slung over his shoulder, and rode about four miles from his home to Muirfield. In the tournament, he stunned the gallery by defeating the well-known amateur Guy Campbell. He said, “I one-putted seven greens that day and beat Capt. Campbell, 5 and 3. It was a thrill I would never forget..." He sometimes putted with only his right hand on the putter, but, in this tournament, he used both hands.

== Move to the United States ==
At age 31, despite having no job prospects lined up in the United States, he sailed alone on the SS California from Glasgow to New York on March 9, 1912. He went to New Jersey to stay with his old school friend from North Berwick, Jack Hobens, who was the club pro Englewood Golf Club. Hobens had come to the U.S. in 1899, and had placed in the top ten finishers in seven recent U.S. Opens. Every Monday, the two men would go to New York City to buy supplies at Spalding's golf equipment store. On one of these visits, the store manager said he had that day received a telegram from one of their southern district salesmen, saying that a country club in Tennessee wanted to cancel their order for golf equipment because their present pro had died suddenly of a heart attack. The manager, Matt Kiern, wired Nashville to suggest Livingstone for the vacant job. Livingstone followed the messenger back to the telegraph office where he wired his application. The Nashville's club's secretary, Bradley Walker contacted a friend, sportswriter Grantland Rice, to ask him to interview Livingstone and advise them. At the time, U.S country clubs welcomed Scottish golf pros for their cachet of authentic expertise. After receiving a favorable opinion from Rice, Walker gathered the members of the Nashville Golf and Country Club to convince them that hiring a Scot was the right thing to do because all the American pros "were spoiled", "and would not fit into the scheme of things in Nashville".

== Nashville ==
Livingstone in Nashville, April 5, 1931

Livingstone arrived at the Nashville Golf and Country Club, located on Nashville's West End Avenue, on May 28, 1912. It turned out that club, like many urban golf clubs at the time, was hatching a plan to abandon the present clubhouse and golf course to move to a new site in the suburbs about four miles west. Neither the new clubhouse nor the golf course were yet built. This new course at Belle Meade was to be built on prime land with Richland Creek flowing through it. It was an ideal site that was formerly corn and wheat fields on the estate of William Giles Harding, known as Belle Meade Plantation. The course was routed by Herbert H. Barker, and later revised by Donald Ross, but Livingstone actually did the work of building it. He and his crew were busy from dawn to dusk clearing rocks and planting trees hauled from nearby land, that later became Percy Warner Park, to the site. Livingstone's meagre starting salary was soon increased to $75 per month, with lunch included, and whatever money he could earn by teaching and cleaning clubs at the old downtown club, which was still in operation. By now, his wife and three daughters had joined him in Nashville, and he had a son, James, born there. Livingstone began building his own stone two-story home near the new golf course, on a dirt road at the south end of Nashville's Warner Place that became Westview Avenue. In its construction, he received permission to take quarried stone from the golf course's fourth hole, and stones cleared from the golf course, carried by wheelbarrow to the job site. His workload increased and his salary rapidly went to $110 per month. Meanwhile, he learned distressing news that his father, James Livingstone, had written to the North Berwick Town Council to appeal against his Assessment (tax) on the grounds of poverty. George sent money to his relatives in Scotland who were struggling financially during WWI.

On June 7, 1921, the club moved, and its name was changed from "Nashville Golf and Country Club" to "Belle Meade Country Club". According to historian Gene Pearce, Livingstone "taught new players the game, gave advice to the veteran player, cared for the course, made sure the caddies were trained, and settled all arguments." Livingstone was called on to run many tournaments, including the State Amateur. He said, "If the tournament was in another city, we would get a up a train car full and all go there for the week". He acted a coach for the local contestants and was often the starter on the first tee. Livingstone set down rules and enforced them. He commanded respect, especially after the word spread of the incident where he disqualified a golfer who showed up late. Livingstone tightened up the state amateur tournament entry process with help from the newly-formed (1914) Tennessee Golf Association.

In 1924, Livingstone defeated Harry Vardon and Ted Ray in an exhibition match at Belle Meade; in the same year, he won the Nashville City Open. He played in the 1926 Southeastern PGA Championship, also at Belle Meade. He shot 66-67 in the first two rounds for a total of 133, breaking the previous world record of 134 set by Bobby Jones. In 1919, Livingstone and his amateur partner Chick Evans were defeated by Bobby Jones and Perry Adair in a benefit match for the Red Cross, played over the Belle Meade course. Such exhibition matches were popular events, often fundraisers, that helped promote golf. On April 5, 1931, Babe Ruth was in Nashville for a Yankees exhibition game to be held in the afternoon. That morning, Ruth was hosted by Livingstone to play golf at Belle Meade; Ruth shot 81(41–40).

== Legacy ==
Livingstone's manner could be gruff at times. One of the club members, Harrison Hill, learned do a near-perfect imitation of Livingstone’s mannerisms, and when Livingstone saw it, he dissolved into laughter. After 35 years at Belle Meade, Livingstone retired in 1947. He continued to play golf in his later years, and was an active participant in the PGA Seniors' Championship. He won his age bracket for four years. In his final tournament win, for "85 and older", he was the sole entrant, but still shot a 95.

Sportswriter Fred Russell said of Livingstone, "I have known few men more devoted to their work, truer to their loyalties, and honest in their dealings with their fellow man." Livingstone never drank alcohol. Even near the end of his life, he retained his thick Scottish brogue and used such quaint phrases as: “without the word of a lie” and “I’m of the mind.” Livingstone died at age 88 on December 17, 1968. He organized many golf exhibition matches to benefit charities. Livingstone was inducted into the Tennessee Sports Hall of Fame. Today, an honorary golf "Heritage Trail" is mapped out in North Berwick, featuring a plaque at the site where Livingstone was born.
