= 1900 Kendall Orange and Black football team =

American college football season

1900 Kendall Orange and Black football
- Conference: Independent
- Record: 2–1
- Head coach: F. M. Whitmore (1st season)

1900 Southern college football independents records
	Conf.			Overall
Team	W	L	T	W		L		T
Baylor		–		3	–	0	–	0
Davidson		–		4	–	1	–	0
Centre		–		4	–	1	–	1
Virginia		–		7	–	2	–	1
Georgetown		–		5	–	1	–	3
VMI		–		4	–	1	–	2
Oklahoma		–		3	–	1	–	1
Kendall		–		2	–	1	–	0
Marshall		–		1	–	0	–	2
Navy		–		6	–	3	–	0
Arkansas		–		2	–	1	–	1
South Carolina		–		4	–	3	–	0
West Virginia		–		4	–	3	–	0
VPI		–		3	–	3	–	1
Texas A&M		–		2	–	2	–	1
Richmond		–		3	–	4	–	0
Maryland		–		3	–	4	–	1
Delaware		–		2	–	3	–	1
William & Mary		–		1	–	2	–	0
North Carolina A&M		–		1	–	5	–	0
Furman		–		0	–	2	–	1

The 1900 Kendall Orange and Black football team represented Henry Kendall College—now known as the University of Tulsa—as an independent during the 1900 college football season. Led by F. M. Whitmore in his first and only season as head coach, Kendall compiled a 2–1 record. The team defeated Indian University (33–0) and Krebs High School (11–5) and lost to the Cherokee Male Seminary (18–0).

== Schedule ==
Date	Opponent	Site	Result	Source
October 26	Indian University	Kendall athletic grounds; Muskogee, Indian Territory	W 30–0 or 33–0	
November 2	Cherokee Male Seminary	Muskogee, Indian Territory	L 0–18	
November 29	at Krebs High	Krebs park; Krebs, Indian Territory	W 11–5	
