= Carlos A. Long =

American politician

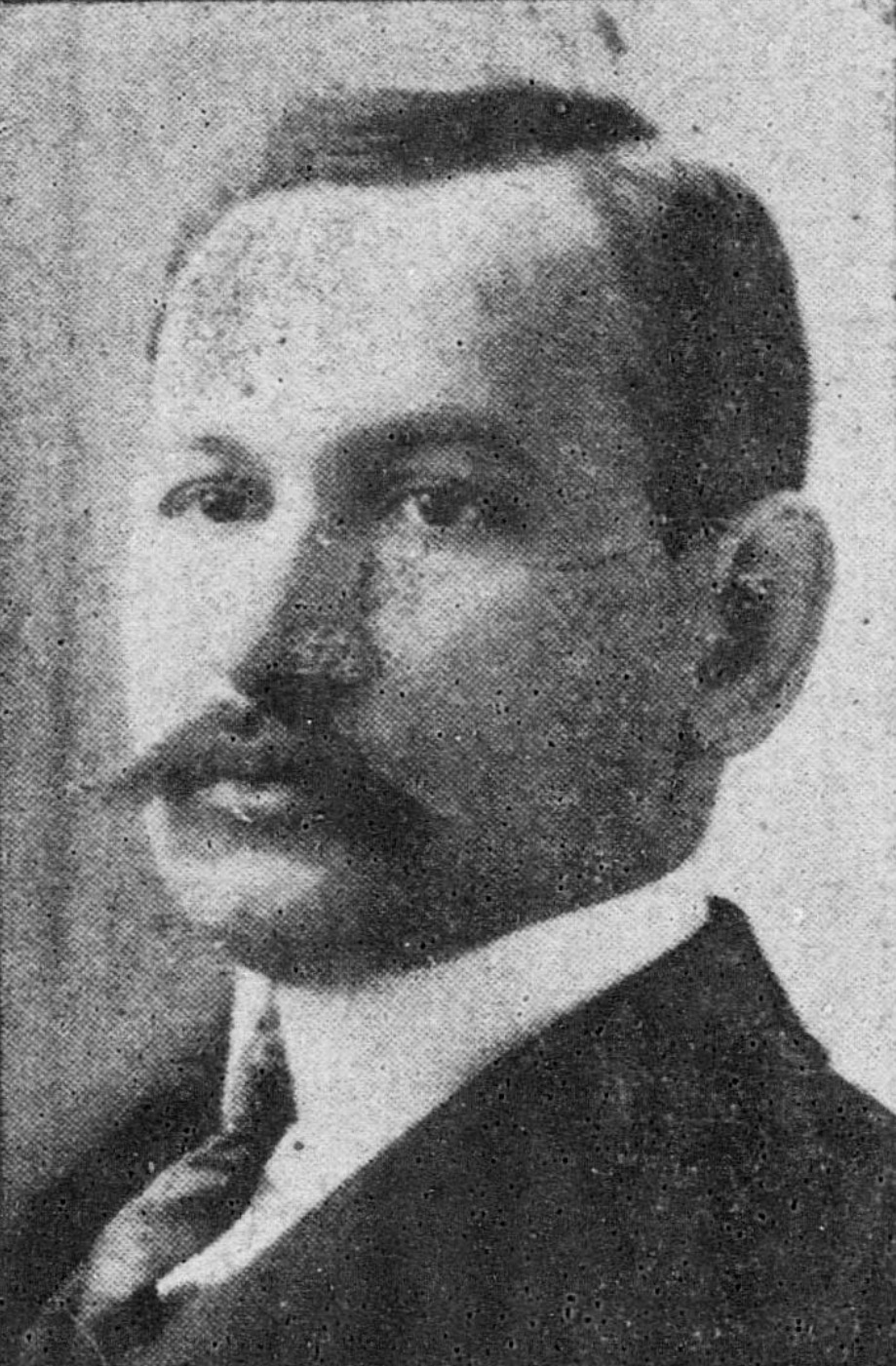
- Long, c. 1902
- Born: March 4, 1874; Honolulu, Kingdom of Hawaii
- Died: January 1943 (aged 68); Honolulu, Territory of Hawaii
- Occupations: Attorney, Politician
- Political party: Republican; Home Rule
- Football career

Profile
- Position: Center
- Class: LL B,1900

Career information
- High school: Punahou (1892–1893)
- College: Georgetown (1898–1899)

Awards and highlights
- All-Southern (1899)

Carlos Appiani Long (March 4, 1874 – January 1943) was an attorney and politician of the Territory of Hawaii. In his youth, he was a college football player at Georgetown University. His middle name is often spelled Appiani, Appianni or Apiani.

== Early life ==
Long was born March 4, 1874, in Honolulu, capital of the then-independent Kingdom of Hawaii. His parents were Charles Long, an Italian immigrant from Milan, and Julia Naoho (1859–1916), a Native Hawaiian from the island of Maui and relative of historian Samuel Kamakau. After his father's death, his mother remarried to John F. Colburn, who became a member of Queen Liliuokalani's cabinet during the final week before the Overthrow of the Kingdom of Hawaii in 1893. He had many siblings and half-siblings from his mother's two marriages.

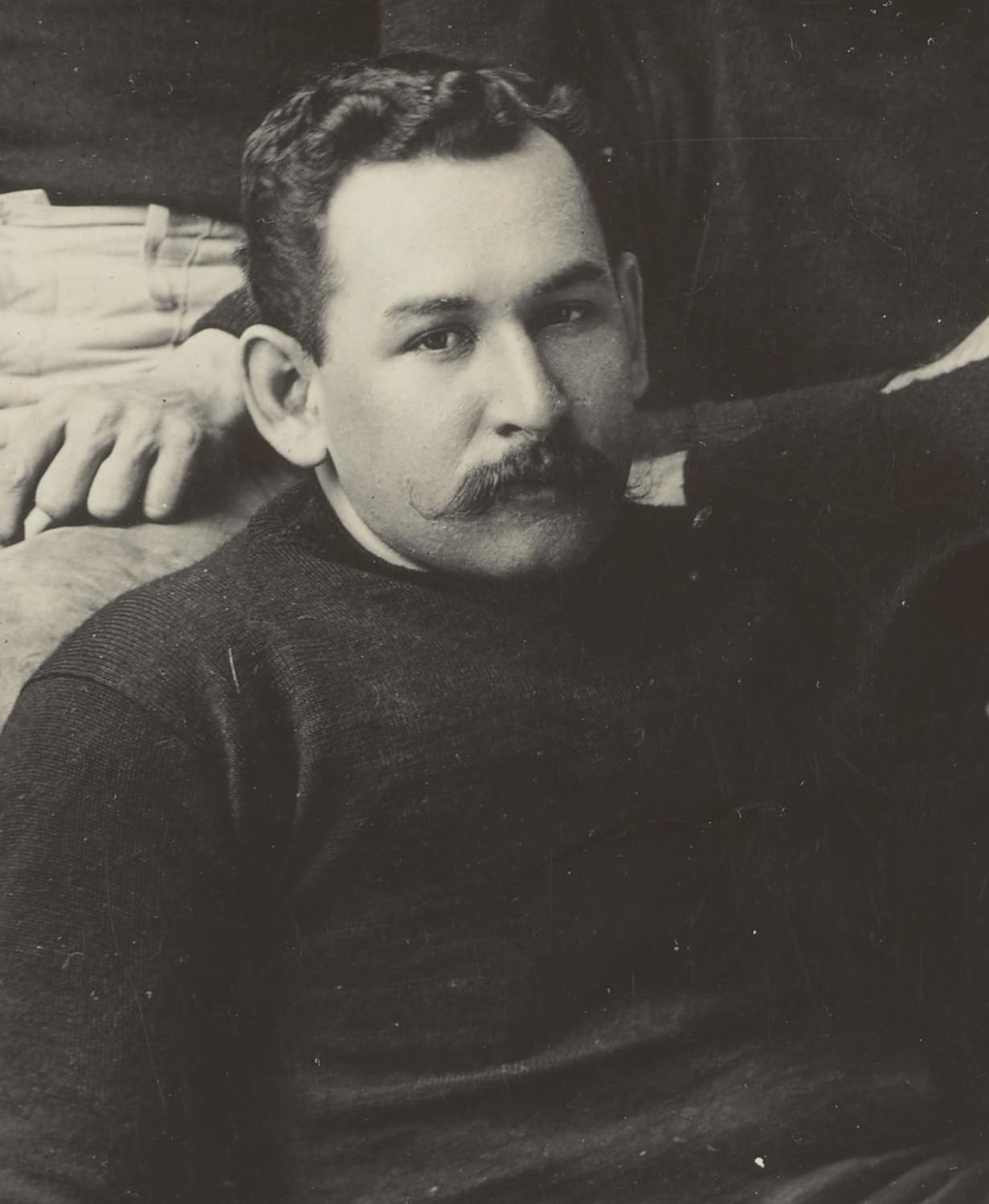
Long about 1895

He received his early education at Saint Louis School and Punahou School (from 1892 to 1893), where he started playing football. He graduated from Santa Clara University and later studied law at Stanford University and finished his law degree at Georgetown University.

=== Georgetown ===
While at Georgetown, he was a prominent center for the football team; his play reminding one writer of Allan Doucette of Harvard. Long was unanimously elected captain of the 1899 team. That same year he was selected All-Southern by University of Virginia athletics director W. A. Lambeth in Outing, who notes "The position at center is easily filled, because Long, of Georgetown, in snapping the ball, blocking, breaking through, tackling and general play, stands without a near rival."

== Political and legal career ==
After graduating from Georgetown with a degree in law, Long was admitted to bar in the District of Columbia and later returned to Hawaii, which had been annexed to the United States, where he passed the bar of Hawaii on October 16, 1901.

Long entered politics as a member of the Home Rule Party of Hawaii. He later joined with Hawaii Republican Party in 1902 and was elected to the House of Representatives for the Fourth District, and sat in the Legislature of Territory of Hawaii from 1903 to 1905. During the 1903 legislative session, he proposed the so-called "Long Municipal Act", aimed at establishing home-rule and self-government for the citizens of Honolulu. The act was drafted by the African-American lawyer and Republican committee member Thomas McCants Stewart. Despite passing the house, it was vetoed by Governor Sanford B. Dole. Historian J. Clay Smith Jr. noted this and other similar, contemporary legislation contributed to the local movement which eventually led to Hawaii's statehood in 1959.

Long later worked as a tax accessor for Kauai until he moved back to Honolulu in 1929 where he became an estates administrator and was involved in the real estate business.

== Personal ==
On July 30, 1895, he married his first wife Irene Martha Buchanan in Cathedral Basilica of Our Lady of Peace. They divorced in 1898 and she remarried in 1900 to William H. Cornwell Jr., the son of William H. Cornwell. On April 4, 1912, he married Elizabeth Maunakapu Whiting (born 1885), daughter of Kapiho and William Austin Whiting. They had three children: Carlos "Sonny" Long, Leslie Long Pietsch and Elia Austin Long. He died in January 1943 and was buried in the Oahu Cemetery in Honolulu. A memorial published in the records of the Supreme Court of Hawaii gives a description of his character:

Long was quiet, affable, sincere and a true friend of the Hawaiian race. He took a keen interest in civic affairs, and a personal interest in clean athletics. He was a good citizen. He leaves a family to whom he was devoted.

== Bibliography ==
- Alexander, William DeWitt (1907). Oahu College: List of Trustees, Presidents, Instructors, Matrons, Librarians, Superintendents of Grounds and Students, 1841–1906. Historical Sketch of Oahu College. Honolulu: Hawaiian Gazette Company. OCLC 16323595.
- Bealle, Morris Allison (1947). The Georgetown Hoyas: The Story of a Rambunctious Football Team. Washington, DC: Columbia Publishing Company. OCLC 4509683.
- Hawaii (1918). Lydecker, Robert Colfax (ed.). Roster Legislatures of Hawaii, 1841–1918. Honolulu: Hawaiian Gazette Company. OCLC 60737418.
- Hawaii. Supreme Court (1944). Hawaii Reports: Cases Determined in the Supreme Court of the Territory of Hawaii. Honolulu: Advertiser Publishing Company. OCLC 801052949.
- Smith, J. Clay Jr (1999). Emancipation: The Making of the Black Lawyer, 1844–1944. Philadelphia: University of Pennsylvania Press. ISBN 0-8122-1685-7. OCLC 27896267.
