= 1900 Marshall Thundering Herd football team =

American college football season

1900 Marshall Thundering Herd football
- Conference: Independent
- Record: 1–0–2
- Head coach: None
- Home stadium: Central Field

1900 Southern college football independents records
	Conf.			Overall
Team	W	L	T	W		L		T
Baylor		–		3	–	0	–	0
Davidson		–		4	–	1	–	0
Centre		–		4	–	1	–	1
Virginia		–		7	–	2	–	1
Georgetown		–		5	–	1	–	3
VMI		–		4	–	1	–	2
Oklahoma		–		3	–	1	–	1
Kendall		–		2	–	1	–	0
Marshall		–		1	–	0	–	2
Navy		–		6	–	3	–	0
Arkansas		–		2	–	1	–	1
South Carolina		–		4	–	3	–	0
West Virginia		–		4	–	3	–	0
VPI		–		3	–	3	–	1
Texas A&M		–		2	–	2	–	1
Richmond		–		3	–	4	–	0
Maryland		–		3	–	4	–	1
Delaware		–		2	–	3	–	1
William & Mary		–		1	–	2	–	0
North Carolina A&M		–		1	–	5	–	0
Furman		–		0	–	2	–	1

The 1900 Marshall Thundering Herd football team represented Marshall University as an independent during the 1900 college football season. The team did not have a coach, and outscored their opponents 20–0 in three games.

The 1900 season marked the second undefeated season in a row for Marshall.

== Schedule ==
Date	Opponent	Site	Result
October 19	Catlettsburg Juniors	Central Field; Huntington, WV	T 0–0
November 19	Ironton^{†}	Central Field; Huntington, WV	W 20–0
November 29	Catlettsburg	Central Field; Huntington, WV	T 0–0
^{†}Homecoming
