= 1900 Georgetown Blue and Gray football team =

American college football season

1900 Georgetown Blue and Gray football
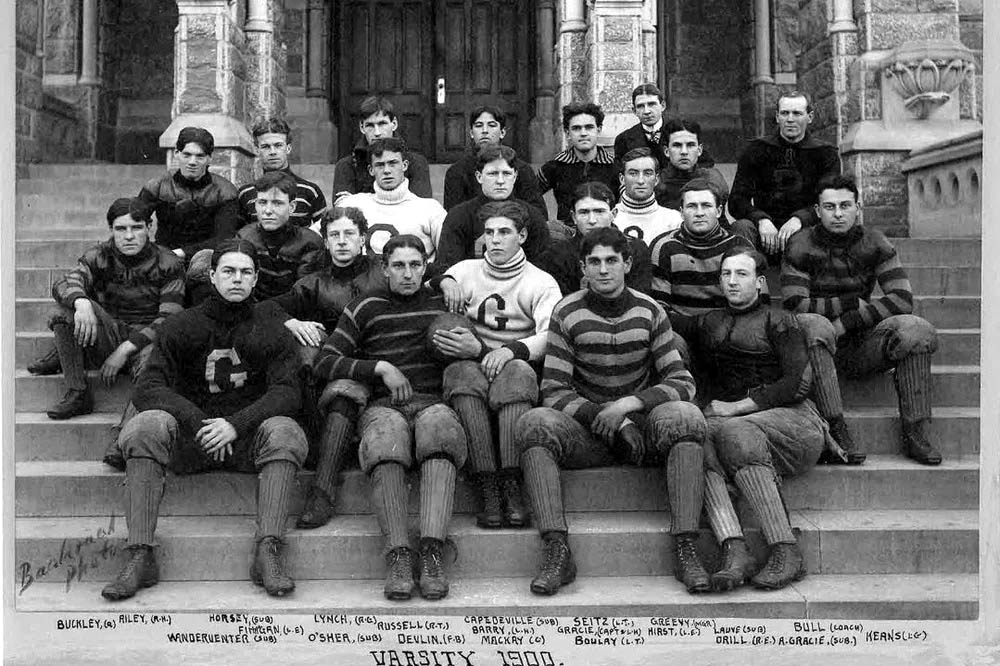
- Conference: Independent
- Record: 5–1–3
- Head coach: Alfred E. Bull (1st season)
- Captain: Art Devlin
- Home stadium: Georgetown Field

1900 Southern college football independents records
	Conf.			Overall
Team	W	L	T	W		L		T
Baylor		–		3	–	0	–	0
Davidson		–		4	–	1	–	0
Centre		–		4	–	1	–	1
Virginia		–		7	–	2	–	1
Georgetown		–		5	–	1	–	3
VMI		–		4	–	1	–	2
Oklahoma		–		3	–	1	–	1
Kendall		–		2	–	1	–	0
Marshall		–		1	–	0	–	2
Navy		–		6	–	3	–	0
Arkansas		–		2	–	1	–	1
South Carolina		–		4	–	3	–	0
West Virginia		–		4	–	3	–	0
VPI		–		3	–	3	–	1
Texas A&M		–		2	–	2	–	1
Richmond		–		3	–	4	–	0
Maryland		–		3	–	4	–	1
Delaware		–		2	–	3	–	1
William & Mary		–		1	–	2	–	0
North Carolina A&M		–		1	–	5	–	0
Furman		–		0	–	2	–	1

The 1900 Georgetown Blue and Gray football team represented Georgetown University as an indepdennt during the 1900 college football season. Led by Alfred E. Bull in his first and only season as head coach, Georgetown compiled a record of 5–1–3. Art Devlin was the team's captain. The Blue and Gray played home games at Georgetown Field in Washington, D.C.

== Schedule ==
Date	Time	Opponent	Site	Result	Attendance	Source
October 13		St. John's (MD)	Georgetown Field; Washington, DC	W 6–0		
October 20		at Navy	Worden Field; Annapolis, MD	L 0–6		
October 31	4:00 p.m.	Richmond	Georgetown Field; Washington, DC	W 84–0		
November 3		Swarthmore	Georgetown Field; Washington, DC	T 16–16		
November 7		Gettysburg	Georgetown Field; Washington, DC	W 23–5		
November 10	3:35 p.m.	vs. VMI	Broad Street Park; Richmond, VA	W 17–10	500–1500	
November 17		Virginia	Georgetown Field; Washington, DC	W 10–0	2,000	
November 24		Gallaudet	Georgetown Field; Washington, DC	T 5–5		
November 29		North Carolina	Georgetown Field; Washington, DC	T 0–0		
