= 1900 Oklahoma Sooners football team =

American college football season

1900 Oklahoma Sooners football
- Conference: Independent
- Record: 3–1–1
- Head coach: Vernon Louis Parrington (4th season)
- Captain: C. C. Roberts

1900 Southern college football independents records
| | Conf. | | | Overall |
| Team | W | L | T | W | | L | | T |
|---|---|---|---|---|---|---|---|---|
| Baylor | | – | | 3 | – | 0 | – | 0 |
| Davidson | | – | | 4 | – | 1 | – | 0 |
| Centre | | – | | 4 | – | 1 | – | 1 |
| Virginia | | – | | 7 | – | 2 | – | 1 |
| Georgetown | | – | | 5 | – | 1 | – | 3 |
| VMI | | – | | 4 | – | 1 | – | 2 |
| Oklahoma | | – | | 3 | – | 1 | – | 1 |
| Kendall | | – | | 2 | – | 1 | – | 0 |
| Marshall | | – | | 1 | – | 0 | – | 2 |
| Navy | | – | | 6 | – | 3 | – | 0 |
| Arkansas | | – | | 2 | – | 1 | – | 1 |
| South Carolina | | – | | 4 | – | 3 | – | 0 |
| West Virginia | | – | | 4 | – | 3 | – | 0 |
| VPI | | – | | 3 | – | 3 | – | 1 |
| Texas A&M | | – | | 2 | – | 2 | – | 1 |
| Richmond | | – | | 3 | – | 4 | – | 0 |
| Maryland | | – | | 3 | – | 4 | – | 1 |
| Delaware | | – | | 2 | – | 3 | – | 1 |
| William & Mary | | – | | 1 | – | 2 | – | 0 |
| North Carolina A&M | | – | | 1 | – | 5 | – | 0 |
| Furman | | – | | 0 | – | 2 | – | 1 |

The 1900 Oklahoma Sooners football team represented the University of Oklahoma as an independent during the 1900 college football season. In their sixth year of football, and fourth year under head coach Vernon Louis Parrington, the Sooners compiled a 3–1–1 record, and outscored their opponents by a combined total of 118 to 28. This season was the first in which the team played the Texas Longhorns and began the Red River Showdown.

== Schedule ==
| Date | Time | Opponent | Site | Result | Attendance | Source |
|---|---|---|---|---|---|---|
| October 10 | 3:30 p.m. | at Texas | Varsity Athletic Field; Austin, TX (rivalry) | L 2–28 | 500 | |
| October 13 | 3:30 p.m. | Chilocco | Norman, Oklahoma Territory | W 27–0 | 300 | |
| November 2 | 3:35 p.m. | Fort Reno | Norman, Oklahoma Territory | W 79–0 | | |
| November 17 | | at Kingfisher | Kingfisher, Oklahoma Territory | T 0–0 | | |
| November 29 | | at Arkansas City Town Team | Arkansas City, KS | W 10–0 | | |
