= 1900 Virginia Orange and Blue football team =

American college football season

1900 Virginia Orange and Blue football

Southern champion
- Conference: Independent
- Record: 7–2–1
- Head coach: Archie Hoxton (2nd season)
- Captain: John Loyd
- Home stadium: Madison Hall Field

1900 Southern college football independents records
	Conf.			Overall
Team	W	L	T	W		L		T
Baylor		–		3	–	0	–	0
Davidson		–		4	–	1	–	0
Centre		–		4	–	1	–	1
Virginia		–		7	–	2	–	1
Georgetown		–		5	–	1	–	3
VMI		–		4	–	1	–	2
Oklahoma		–		3	–	1	–	1
Kendall		–		2	–	1	–	0
Marshall		–		1	–	0	–	2
Navy		–		6	–	3	–	0
Arkansas		–		2	–	1	–	1
South Carolina		–		4	–	3	–	0
West Virginia		–		4	–	3	–	0
VPI		–		3	–	3	–	1
Texas A&M		–		2	–	2	–	1
Richmond		–		3	–	4	–	0
Maryland		–		3	–	4	–	1
Delaware		–		2	–	3	–	1
William & Mary		–		1	–	2	–	0
North Carolina A&M		–		1	–	5	–	0
Furman		–		0	–	2	–	1

The 1900 Virginia Orange and Blue football team represented the University of Virginia as an independent during the 1900 college football season. Led by second-year coach Archie Hoxton, the team went 7–2–1 and claims a Southern championship. The team was captained by tackle John Loyd. The Orange and Blue defeated Sewanee, to give the Tigers its first loss since 1897.

== Schedule ==
Date	Time	Opponent	Site	Result	Attendance	Source
October 5		Washington and Lee	Madison Hall Field; Charlottesville, VA	W 28–0		
October 10		Richmond	Madison Hall Field; Charlottesville, VA	W 51–0		
October 13	4:00 p.m.	vs. Carlisle	National Park; Washington, DC	L 2–16		
October 20		Johns Hopkins	Madison Hall Field; Charlottesville, VA	W 20–0		
October 24		at VMI	VMI Parade Ground; Lexington, VA	T 0–0		
November 10		Gallaudet	Madison Hall Field; Charlottesville, VA	W 34–0		
November 14		VPI	Madison Hall Field; Charlottesville, VA (rivalry)	W 17–5		
November 17		at Georgetown	Georgetown Field; Washington, DC	L 0–10		
November 24	2:30 p.m.	vs. North Carolina	League Park; Norfolk, VA (rivalry)	W 17–0	6,000	
November 29	2:35 p.m.	vs. Sewanee	Broad Street Park; Richmond, VA	W 17–5		

== Preseason ==
Archie Hoxton was in his second season as head coach. William Choice transferred from rival VPI.

== Game summaries ==
=== Washington and Lee ===
The season opened with a 28–0 defeat of the Washington and Lee Generals.

The starting lineup was Hobson (left end), Loyd (left tackle), Harris (left guard), Montgomery (center), Haskell (right guard), Walker (right tackle), McCall (right end). Mallory (quarterback), Dabney (left halfback), Carroll (right halfback), and Coleman (fullback).

=== Richmond ===
In the second week of play, Virginia defeated Richmond 51–0.

The starting lineup was Hobson (left end), Loyd (left tackle), Harris (left guard), Montgomery (center), Haskell (right guard), Walker (right tackle), Bride (right end). Mallory (quarterback), Carroll (left halfback), Nalle (right halfback), and Coleman (fullback).

=== Carlisle ===
On a muddy field, the Carlisle Indians beat Virginia 2–16, Once during the game, Bradley Walker grabbed Hawley Pierce, Carlisle's biggest player, and carried him ten yards with him dangling over his shoulder.

The starting lineup was Bride (left end), Loyd (left tackle), Harris (left guard), Montgomery (center), Haskel (right guard), Walker (right tackle), Hobson (right end). Mallory (quarterback), Dabney (left halfback), Nalle (right halfback), and Coleman (fullback).

=== Johns Hopkins ===
Virginia beat Johns Hopkins 40–0. Walker had several long runs for touchdown in the second half.

The starting lineup was Hobson (left end), Loyd (left tackle), Choice (left guard), Montgomery (center), Haskel (right guard), Walker (right tackle), Bride (right end). Tutwiler (quarterback), Dabney (left halfback), Nalle (right halfback), and Coleman (fullback).

=== VMI ===
VMI fought Virginia to a scoreless tie. The game was called the greatest ever played in Lexington. George Marshall played for VMI.

The starting lineup was Hobson (left end), Loyd (left tackle), Choice (left guard), Montgomery (center), Haskell (right guard), Walker (right tackle), Bride (right end). Tutwiler (quarterback), Nalle (left halfback), Dabney (right halfback), and Coleman (fullback).

=== Gallaudet ===
Virginia beat Gallaudet 34–0. A Brodie Nalle touchdown was the highlight of the game.

The starting lineup was Hobson (left end), Loyd (left tackle), Harris (left guard), Montgomery (center), Haskel (right guard), Benet (right tackle), Bride (right end). Nalle (quarterback), Dabney (left halfback), Coleman (right halfback), and Walker (fullback).

=== VPI ===
Virginia defeated VPI 17–5. Hunter Carpenter had in earlier games used the alias "Walter Brown" because his father had forbidden him to play football.

The starting lineup was Hobson (left end), Loyd (left tackle), Harris (left guard), Montgomery (center), Haskel (right guard), Benet (right tackle), Bride (right end). Nalle (quarterback), Dabney (left halfback), Coleman (right halfback), and Walker (fullback).

=== Georgetown ===
Two fumbles cost Virginia the game against Georgetown, losing 0–10.

The starting lineup was Hobson (left end), Waters (left tackle), Choice (left guard), Montgomery (center), Haskel (right guard), Benet (right tackle), Bride (right end). Nalle (quarterback), Dabney (left halfback), Coleman (right halfback), and Walker (fullback).

=== North Carolina ===
In the rivalry game with North Carolina in Norfolk, Virginia beat the Tar Heels 17–0. The Stonewall Brigade Band accompanied the Virginia team, and played in the hotel lobby.

The starting lineup was Bride (left end), Loyd (left tackle), Choice (left guard), Montgomery (center), Haskell (right guard), Benet (right tackle), Watters (right end). Nalle (quarterback), Dabney (left halfback), Coleman (right halfback), and Walker (fullback).

=== Sewanee ===
To close the season in Richmond, the Orange and Blue defeated Sewanee, 17–5, to capture a Southern championship.

The starting lineup was Hobson (left end), Loyd (left tackle), Choice (left guard), Montgomery (center), Haskel (right guard), Benet (right tackle), Bride (right end). Nalle (quarterback), Dabney (left halfback), Coleman (right halfback), and Walker (fullback).

== After the season ==
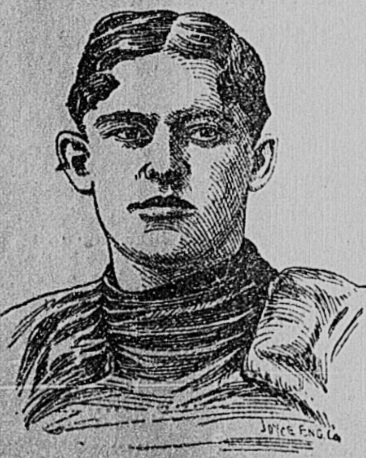
Bradley Walker, c. 1900

Virginia claimed the Southern championship.

Caspar Whitney, the originator of the concept of the All-America team, selected an All-Southern eleven for Outing. Hobson, Loyd, Choice, and Dabney all made his team. Walker and Nalle he ruled ineligible. W. H. Hoge also selected an All-Southern team. On his team was Dabney and Walker, with Haskel, Coleman, and Nalle as substitutes.

== Players ==
=== Line ===
Player	Position	Games started	Hometown	Prep school	Height	Weight	Age
Alexis Hobson	end		Richmond, Virginia			150	
John Loyd	tackle			Richmond College	5'11"	180	
William Choice	guard		Spartanburg, South Carolina			171	
George W. Montgomery	center						
Charles C. Haskel	guard						
Christie Benet	tackle		Abbeville, South Carolina				
James C. Bride	end						
Watters	end						

=== Backfield ===
Player	Position	Games started	Hometown	Prep school	Height	Weight	Age
Robert M. Coleman	halfback		Lexington, Kentucky			142	
Virginius Dabney	halfback		Charlottesville, Virginia				
Brodie Nalle	quarterback		Culpeper, Virginia				
Ed Tutwiler	quarterback		Birmingham, Alabama				
Bradley Walker	fullback		Nashville, Tennessee	University of Nashville	6'3"	198	

=== Substitutes ===
Player	Position
Carroll	halfback
Frank C. Harris	fullback
Johnson
Mallory	quarterback
Burnley Lankford
