= 1900 Furman Baptists football team =

American college football season

1900 Furman Baptists football
- Conference: Independent
- Record: 0–2–1
- Head coach: Frank Spencer (1st season)
- Captain: Grover C. Scaife

1900 Southern college football independents records
	Conf.			Overall
Team	W	L	T	W		L		T
Baylor		–		3	–	0	–	0
Davidson		–		4	–	1	–	0
Centre		–		4	–	1	–	1
Virginia		–		7	–	2	–	1
Georgetown		–		5	–	1	–	3
VMI		–		4	–	1	–	2
Oklahoma		–		3	–	1	–	1
Kendall		–		2	–	1	–	0
Marshall		–		1	–	0	–	2
Navy		–		6	–	3	–	0
Arkansas		–		2	–	1	–	1
South Carolina		–		4	–	3	–	0
West Virginia		–		4	–	3	–	0
VPI		–		3	–	3	–	1
Texas A&M		–		2	–	2	–	1
Richmond		–		3	–	4	–	0
Maryland		–		3	–	4	–	1
Delaware		–		2	–	3	–	1
William & Mary		–		1	–	2	–	0
North Carolina A&M		–		1	–	5	–	0
Furman		–		0	–	2	–	1

The 1900 Furman Baptists football team represented Furman University as an independent during the 1900 college football season. Led by Frank Spencer in his first an only season as head coach, Furman compiled a record of 0–2–1.

== Schedule ==
Date	Opponent	Site	Result	Source
October 26	at Wofford	Spartanburg, SC (rivalry)	T 0–0	
November 17	South Carolina	Greenville, SC	L 0–27	
November 29	Wofford	Greenville, SC	L 5–6	
