= Latta Park =

Park in North Carolina, US

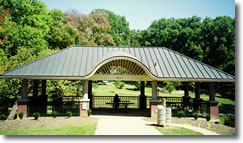
- Latta Park Pavilion
- Interactive map of Latta Park
- Type: Public park
- Location: Charlotte, North Carolina
- Coordinates: 35.2096°N 80.8507°W
- Area: 31 acres (13 ha)
- Created: 1897
- Operator: Mecklenburg County Parks and Recreation
- Website: Latta Park

Latta Park is a 31-acre urban park at 601 East Park Avenue in the Dilworth neighborhood of Charlotte, North Carolina. It features courts for tennis, volleyball, and basketball, as well as many benches and picnic facilities, playgrounds, walking trails, fitness trails, and soccer fields. Latta Park was designed to be kid-friendly and is one of the five Charlotte parks that feature a "sprayground", a water themed playground where children can splash and jump.

Latta Park, as well as the neighborhood it sits in, are both named after Edward Dilworth Latta, the early 20th century Charlotte entrepreneur and real estate developer. The park was designed by the English landscape architect Joseph Forsyth Johnson. Adjacent to Latta Park is the Tom Sykes Recreation Center.

Originally, Latta Park covered a much larger area and even included a baseball park, 1/3-mile cycling track, and grounds rented by the Mecklenburg Fair Association. The Charlotte Hornets minor league baseball team played home games at the Latta Park Baseball Field, and the Philadelphia Phillies and Brooklyn Dodgers practiced and played spring training exhibition games at the ballpark in 1899, 1900, and 1901.
