= William Choice =

American football player (1880–1942)

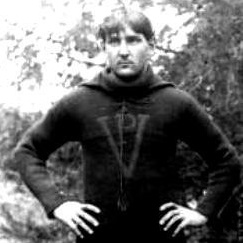
- Choice at VPI in 1899.

Profile
- Position: Guard

Personal information
- Born: June 9, 1880; Spartanburg, South Carolina, U.S.
- Died: February 6, 1942 (aged 61); Richland County, South Carolina, U.S.
- Listed weight: 171 lb (78 kg)

Career information
- College: VPI (1899); Virginia (1900)

Awards and highlights
- Southern championship (1900); All-Southern (1899, 1900)

William Choice Jr. (9 June 1880 – 6 February 1942) was a college football player. He served in the Spanish–American War.

== College football ==
=== VPI ===
In 1899 he was a prominent guard for Virginia Polytechnic Institute, and selected for the All-Southern all-star team.

=== University of Virginia ===
In 1900 he played for Southern champions, Virginia Cavaliers, and was again selected for All-Southern.
