= Virginius Dabney (American football) =

American football player and coach, otolaryngologist (1878–1942)

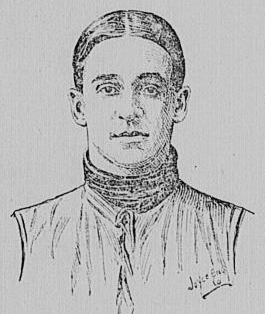
- Depiction of Dabney, c. 1900

Biographical details
- Born: February 2, 1878; Charlottesville, Virginia, U.S.
- Died: January 18, 1942 (aged 63); Washington, D.C., U.S.

Playing career
- 1896–1900: Virginia
- Position: Halfback

Coaching career (HC unless noted)
- 1902: Tulane

Head coaching record
- Overall: 1–4–2

Accomplishments and honors

Awards
- All-Southern (1900)

Virginius Dabney (February 2, 1878 – January 18, 1942) was an American college football player and coach and otolaryngologist. He served as the head football coach at Tulane University in 1902.

== Playing career ==
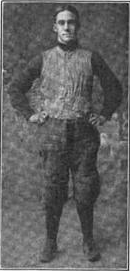
Dabney in uniform

Dabney attended the University of Virginia, where he played on the football team as a prominent halfback from 1896 to 1900. He was a member of Delta Kappa Epsilon.

=== 1900 ===
Dabney was selected All-Southern by Caspar Whitney in Outing. Virginia had a claim to a Southern championship. The Cavaliers defeated Sewanee 17 to 5 to give the school its first loss since 1897. Dabney ran for two touchdowns that game. An account of one of those reads "Dabney ran twenty yards for a touchdown, the gain being largely due to the splendid interference led by Walker and Haskel.

== Coaching career ==
=== 1902 ===
In 1902, he was the head coach of the football team at Tulane University. The Olive and Blue amassed a 1–4–2 record that season.

== Later life ==
Dabney was later an otolaryngologist. He graduated from Heidelberg University in Heidelberg, Germany and a medical school in Vienna, Austria. Dabney served as the chief of staff at Episcopal Eye, Ear, and Throat Hospital in Washington, D.C. for 14 years. He died on January 17, 1942, at his home in Washington. Dabney was the half-uncle his namesake, Virginius Dabney, who was an editor of the Richmond Times-Dispatch.

== Head coaching record ==
Year	Team	Overall	Conference	Standing	Bowl/playoffs
Tulane Olive and Blue (Southern Intercollegiate Athletic Association) (1902)
1902	Tulane	1–4–2	0–4–2	17th	
Tulane:		1–4–2	0–4–2		
Total:		1–4–2			
