= Frank Bennett (American football) =

American football player (1879–1936)

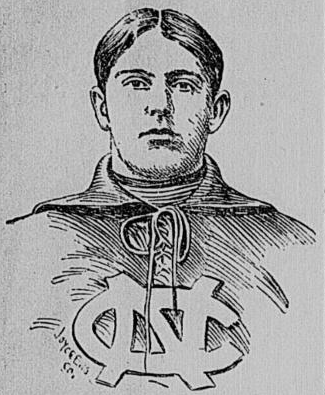
- Depiction of Bennett c. 1900

Profile
- Position: Tackle

Personal information
- Born: March 8, 1879; Wadesboro, North Carolina, U.S.
- Died: January 5, 1936 (aged 56); Wadesboro, North Carolina, U.S.
- Listed height: 6 ft 0 in (1.83 m)
- Listed weight: 173 lb (78 kg)

Career information
- College: North Carolina (1896–1901)

Awards and highlights
- Southern championship (1898); All-Southern (1898, 1900)

Frank Bennett, Jr. (March 8, 1879 – January 5, 1936) was a college football player.

== Early life ==
Bennett was the son of a Confederate captain.

== University of North Carolina ==
He was a prominent tackle for the North Carolina Tar Heels football teams of the University of North Carolina. He was selected third-team for an all-time Carolina football team of Dr. R. B. Lawson in 1934.

=== 1898 ===
Bennett was selected All-Southern in 1898. North Carolina won the South and posted its only undefeated record to date.

=== 1900 ===
Bennett was selected All-Southern in 1900.

=== 1901 ===
He was captain of the 1901 team.
