= John Loyd =

American football player and physician (1875–1943)

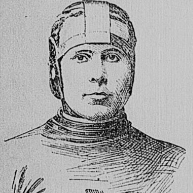
- Loyd c. 1900

Profile
- Position: Tackle

Personal information
- Born: May 5, 1875; Bedford County, Virginia
- Died: March 4, 1943 (aged 67); Rockbridge County, Virginia
- Listed height: 5 ft 11 in (1.80 m)
- Listed weight: 180 lb (82 kg)

Career information
- College: Richmond (1892–1895); Virginia (1898–1900)

Awards and highlights
- Southern championship (1900); All-Southern (1898, 1899, 1900)

John Edward Loyd (May 5, 1875 – March 4, 1943) was an American college football player and physician.

== College football ==
Loyd played for Richmond College from 1892 to 1895 and for the Virginia Cavaliers from 1898 to 1900. He was captain of the team in 1900, a year in which Virginia had a claim to a Southern championship and defeated Sewanee to give the school its first loss since 1897. Loyd was thrice selected to the All-Southern team as a tackle.

== Physician ==
He was once resident physician at the Chesapeake and Ohio Hospital at Clifton Forge.
