= 1900 VMI Keydets football team =

American college football season

1900 VMI Keydets football
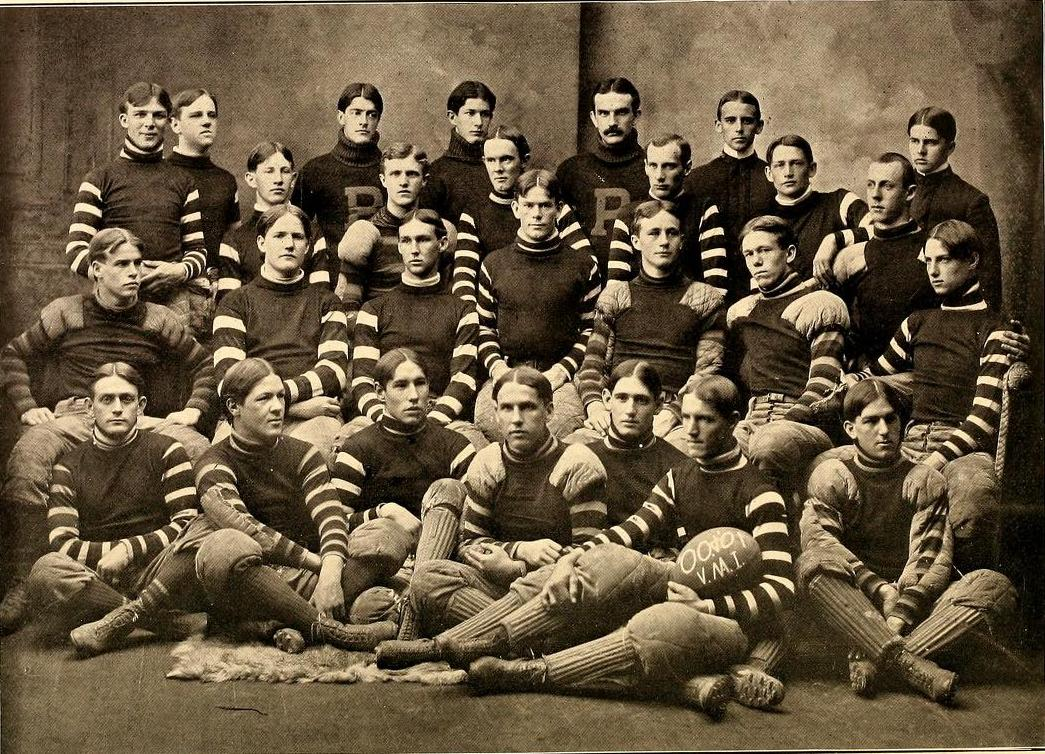
- Conference: Independent
- Record: 4–1–2
- Head coach: Sam Walker (1st season)

1900 Southern college football independents records
	Conf.			Overall
Team	W	L	T	W		L		T
Baylor		–		3	–	0	–	0
Davidson		–		4	–	1	–	0
Centre		–		4	–	1	–	1
Virginia		–		7	–	2	–	1
Georgetown		–		5	–	1	–	3
VMI		–		4	–	1	–	2
Oklahoma		–		3	–	1	–	1
Kendall		–		2	–	1	–	0
Marshall		–		1	–	0	–	2
Navy		–		6	–	3	–	0
Arkansas		–		2	–	1	–	1
South Carolina		–		4	–	3	–	0
West Virginia		–		4	–	3	–	0
VPI		–		3	–	3	–	1
Texas A&M		–		2	–	2	–	1
Richmond		–		3	–	4	–	0
Maryland		–		3	–	4	–	1
Delaware		–		2	–	3	–	1
William & Mary		–		1	–	2	–	0
North Carolina A&M		–		1	–	5	–	0
Furman		–		0	–	2	–	1

The 1900 VMI Keydets football team represented the Virginia Military Institute (VMI) in their tenth season of organized football. The Keydets went 4–1–2 under their new head coach Sam Walker.

The team's All-Southern Tackle was George C. Marshall, who went on to serve as Army Chief of Staff during World War II, and Secretary of State and Secretary of Defense under President Truman.

== Schedule ==
Date	Time	Opponent	Site	Result	Attendance	Source
October 13		at Washington and Lee	Unknown; Lexington, VA	W 11–0		
October 24		Virginia	VMI Parade Ground; Lexington, VA	T 0–0		
November 3		St. Alban's	VMI Parade Ground; Lexington, VA	T 0–0		
November 10	3:35 p.m.	vs. Georgetown	Broad Street Park; Richmond, VA	L 10–17	500–1500	
November 17		Washington and Lee	VMI Parade Ground; Lexington, VA	W 41–0		
November 24		Hampton Athletic Club	VMI Parade Ground; Lexington, VA	W 18–0		
November 29		vs. VPI	Roanoke, VA (rivalry)	W 5–0		
All times are in Eastern time
