= Alexis Hobson =

American football player (1880–1960)

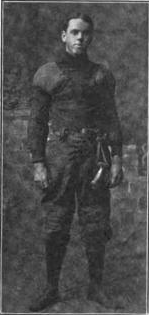
- Hobson c. 1900

Profile
- Position: End

Personal information
- Born: February 25, 1880; Richmond, Virginia, U.S.
- Died: October 20, 1960 (aged 80); Richmond, Virginia, U.S.
- Listed weight: 150 lb (68 kg)

Career information
- College: Virginia (1900–1901)

Awards and highlights
- Southern championship (1900, 1901); All-Southern (1900)

Alexis Corydon Hobson (February 25, 1880 – October 20, 1960) was an American college football player.

== Early life ==
Alexis Corydon Hobson was born to Edwin Lafayette Hobson. His father was a colonel in the Confederate States Army.

== University of Virginia ==
Hobson was a prominent end for the Virginia Cavaliers of the University of Virginia.

=== 1900 ===
Hobson was selected All-Southern in 1900. Virginia claims a Southern championship that year. The team gave Sewanee its first loss in three years by a score of 17 to 5, Hobson once saving a touchdown by tackling College Football Hall of Fame running back Henry Seibels.

== Career ==
Hobson worked for Chesapeake and Ohio Railway.

== Personal life ==
Hobson married Gertrude Skelton. They had a daughter, Mrs. Alexander Hamilton Bryan. His wife predeceased him. He died on October 20, 1960, in Richmond. He was buried in Hollywood Cemetery.
