= Walter Schreiner =

American football player (1877–1933)

Profile
- Position: End

Personal information
- Born: December 31, 1877; Kerrville, Texas
- Died: April 6, 1933 (aged 55); San Antonio, Texas
- Listed weight: 140 lb (64 kg)

Career information
- College: Texas (1896–1900)

Awards and highlights
- All-Southern (1899)

Walter Richard "Crip" Schreiner (December 31, 1877 – April 6, 1933) was an American college football player. He ran the Live Oak Ranch owned by his father for many years. His father gave him the Y O Ranch which he ran until his death in 1933. The Live Oak Ranch became part of the Y O.

== Early life ==
Walter Schreiner was born on December 31, 1877, in Kerrville, Texas to Captain Charles Arman Schreiner and Mary Magdelena Enderle Schreiner. His father Charles was born in Alsace-Lorraine of German ancestry.

== University of Texas ==
He was a prominent end for the Texas Longhorns football team of the University of Texas; the only athlete to win five football letters on the Texas varsity. He was chosen for an all-time Texas team by R. W. Franklin.

=== 1899 ===
He was selected All-Southern in 1899.

=== 1900 ===
Schreiner was captain of the undefeated 1900 team.
