= W. F. Cox =

American football tackle

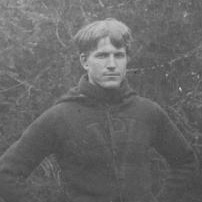

Profile
- Position: Tackle

Personal information
- Born: Cascade, Virginia

Career information
- College: VPI (1897–1900)

Awards and highlights
- All-Southern (1900)

William Franklin Cox was a college football player. From Cascade, Virginia, he played for the Virginia Polytechnic Institute as a tackle. Cox was captain of the 1899 team, and selected All-Southern in 1900.
