= Big Sam (American football) =

American football player

Profile
- Position: Guard

Personal information
- Listed weight: 220 lb (100 kg)

Career information
- College: Texas (1899–1900)

Awards and highlights
- All-Southern (1900)

L. G. "Big" Sam was a college football player.

== University of Texas ==
He was a prominent guard for the Texas Longhorns football team of the University of Texas. He was "a wonder at opening holes;" chosen for an all-time Texas team by R. W. Franklin.

=== 1900 ===
Sam was a member of the undefeated 1900 team. He was selected All-Southern.
