= Brodie Nalle =

American physician (1878–1952)

- Born: September 20, 1878; Culpepper County, Virginia
- Died: February 13, 1952 (aged 73); Charlotte, North Carolina
- Occupation: Physician

Brodie Crump Nalle (September 20, 1878 – February 2, 1952) was a physician from Charlotte, North Carolina.

His father Gustavus Brown Wallace Nalle was one of the VMI cadets at the Battle of New Market. As a youth, he was a college football player, a quarterback for the Virginia Cavaliers football team. In 1900, he starred in the victory over Gallaudet.

He was the chief surgeon for the Piedmont and Northern Railway Company, and the Duke Power Company and its predecessor, Southern Utilities Company. He formed the Nalle Clinic in 1921. In 1941, he became a trustee of Duke University.
