= Hunter Carpenter =

American football player (1883–1953)

- Carpenter at Virginia Tech

Profile
- Position: Halfback

Personal information
- Born: June 23, 1883; Louisa County, Virginia, U.S.
- Died: February 24, 1953 (aged 69); Middletown, New York, U.S.
- Listed height: 5 ft 10 in (1.78 m)
- Listed weight: 192 lb (87 kg)

Career information
- High school: Clifton Forge
- College: Virginia Tech (1899–1903, 1905); North Carolina (1904)

Awards and highlights
- Southern champion (1905); 3× All-Southern (1901, 1902, 1903); Virginia Sports Hall of Fame (1973)
- College Football Hall of Fame

Caius Hunter Carpenter (June 23, 1883 – February 24, 1953) was an American college football halfback who played for both Virginia Tech and North Carolina. Carpenter was inducted into the College Football Hall of Fame in 1957, the Virginia Sports Hall of Fame in 1973, and was in the inaugural induction class of the Virginia Tech Sports Hall of Fame in 1982.

== Early life ==
Carpenter was born in Louisa County, Virginia, the son of Mr. and Mrs. J. C. Carpenter. He attended Clifton Forge High School in Clifton Forge, Virginia.

== College career ==
Carpenter was never named to the All-America team only because Walter Camp, who named the team at the time, said he would never name a player who he had not seen play. Carpenter was inducted into the College Football Hall of Fame in 1957.

=== Virginia Tech ===
Carpenter enrolled at Virginia Tech in 1898, and played college football for the Virginia Tech Hokies football team from 1899 through 1903. He became a man possessed by one thing after Tech was routed by UVA in 1899: beating the Cavaliers in football.

During much of his career, he used the alias "Walter Brown" because his father had forbidden him to play football. It was not until his father saw him play in a game in 1900 against Virginia Military Institute in Norfolk, Virginia that he approved of his participation in football. He is considered by many to be one of greatest football players ever to attend Virginia Tech.

==== 1902 ====
He was named captain of the team in 1902.

==== 1905 ====
Carpenter returned to Virginia Tech in 1905 for a last shot at beating Virginia in his eighth year of college football. Going into the 1905 game, UVA was 8–0 against VPI by a cumulative score of 170–5. The Cavalier Daily ran a story outlining Carpenter's motives and move from Virginia Tech to UNC and back to Tech over the preceding eight years. Virginia accused Carpenter of being a professional player, as he had played college football already for nearly a decade.

Carpenter signed an affidavit that he had not received payment to play against UVA and, against a backdrop of recrimination, Carpenter led VPI to an 11–0 lead. Carpenter was ejected midway through the game for throwing the ball at the face of a Virginia defender, but stayed on the sidelines to watch as neither team was able to score against each other. Carpenter left immediately after the game and moved to Middleton, New York, never to return to the Commonwealth. Carpenter retired 1–7 against UVA, but the Cavaliers still refused to play Virginia Tech again until 1923.

Carpenter helped lead Virginia Tech in 1905 to a 9–1 record, the best in school's history up to that time. During that season, Tech outscored its opponents 305–24, and Carpenter scored 82 points.

=== University of North Carolina ===
==== 1904 ====
Infuriated by his losses to UVA, he played in 1904 at the University of North Carolina. "I just want to beat the University of Virginia," Carpenter was quoted as saying by the Associated Press, in reference to his move to Chapel Hill. However, as a standout on the Tar Heels' football squad, he again failed to win against Virginia for two years in a row. His one year at North Carolina managed to place him amongst the best ever to play at the school.

== Death ==
He died in Middletown, New York.

== See also ==
- Virginia–Virginia Tech football rivalry
