= Bradley Walker =

American athlete and attorney (1877–1951)

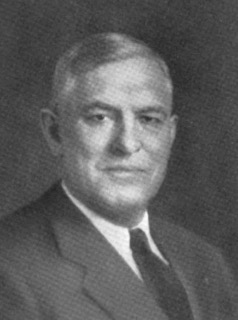
- Photo courtesy of HathiTrust
- Born: October 14, 1877; Columbia, Tennessee, U.S.
- Died: February 3, 1951 (aged 73); Nashville, Tennessee, U.S.
- Resting place: Mount Olivet Cemetery; Nashville, Tennessee, U.S.
- Education: University of Nashville (A. B.); University of Virginia (LL.B.)
- Occupation: Attorney
- Political party: Democrat
- Spouse: Ethel Mathews
- Football career

Virginia Cavaliers
- Position: Fullback/Tackle
- Class: 1902

Personal information
- Listed height: 6 ft 3 in (1.91 m)
- Listed weight: 198 lb (90 kg)

Career information
- High school: Columbia
- College: Nashville (1896–1897); St. Albans (1898–1899); Virginia (1900–1901)

Awards and highlights
- Southern championship (1900, 1901); All-Southern (1900, 1901)

Bradley Walker (October 14, 1877 – February 3, 1951) was a Nashville attorney who, in his youth, was found to be naturally proficient at virtually any sport he tried, including football, baseball, track, boxing, tennis and golf— in all these sports he either set records or won championships or awards.

Walker was best known for his college football performance, playing for the University of Nashville in 1896 and 1897, and the Virginia Cavaliers in 1900 and 1901. He was named to an "All-Southern" team in 1900. He also set records at Virginia in baseball for the highest batting average over a two-year period.

The Palm of Alpha Tau Omega called Walker "one of the all-time greats in Southern athletic history." Describing Walker's football ability, celebrated coach John Heisman said, "he was undoubtedly one of the twenty-five best men that Dixieland ever saw".

When Walker moved to Nashville to practice law in 1903, he kept his interest in football and officiated football games, including major collegiate games, for 25 years. He was also president of the owners of the Nashville Vols baseball team for two years. He was the first president of the Nashville Tennis Club and won the local championship several times. He was the boxing champion of Nashville in 1899. Walker also won the Tennessee State Amateur Golf Championship, and won his local club championship six times, during which he became a friend and confidant of sportswriter Grantland Rice who had just begun playing the game.

== Early life ==
Bradley Walker was born on October 14, 1877, in Columbia, Tennessee, near Nashville. His father was William Overton Walker, a farmer and a lumberman. His mother was Alice Cabler. His grandparents were William Walker and Elizabeth Bradley. Walker attended Columbia High School and later graduated from the University of Nashville's Peabody College (Note: It was called "Peabody Normal School" until 1909, when it became the "George Peabody College for Teachers".) with a teacher's certificate in 1897. From 1898 to 1900, he taught mathematics at St. Albans School in Radford, Virginia.

=== University of Nashville ===
==== Football ====
Walker played at the fullback and tackle positions for the Nashville football team, known as the "Garnet and Blue". Nashville upset the Sewanee squad by a score of 5 to 4 in 1897. John Heisman, coach of the Auburn team who had defeated Nashville 14 to 4 two weeks later, said Walker was the best football player in the school's history, saying "I have no hesitation whatever in declaring that he was undoubtedly one of the twenty-five best men that Dixieland ever saw". (Note: In 1890, eight years before Walker was there, the Nashville Garnet and Blue challenged Vanderbilt to a football game, but lost 40 to 0. This was the first intercollegiate game ever played in Tennessee.) In Heisman's words, "[Walker]... was about 6 feet 3 inches tall and he must have weighed close to 200 pounds even then...our men never seemed to see him coming until he had his gain made and was up at 'em again".

==== Other sports ====
Walker was also on the baseball and track teams. He received his bachelors degree in 1898 from the University of Nashville and received the school's "All-Around Athlete" medal. In 1898, Walker entered a track meet at Vanderbilt and won the 100-yard dash with a time of 10.5 seconds; he came in second in the shot-put, the 440 yard dash, and the hammer throw. He was also the city boxing champion of Nashville in 1899 prior to leaving for Virginia.

=== University of Virginia ===
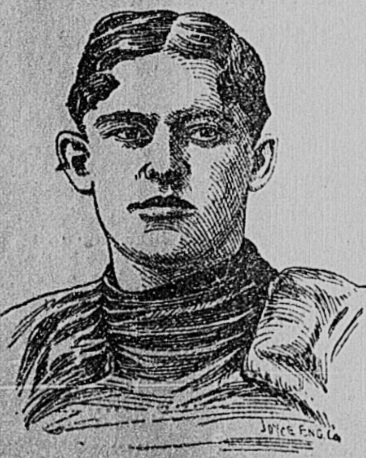
Walker, c. 1900

==== Football ====
He received his law degree at the University of Virginia in a two-year program, 1901 and 1902. Walker starred in football, baseball, and track at the University of Virginia. The Virginia team was the Southern champion in 1900 and gave the Sewanee Tigers their first defeat since 1897 by a score of 17 to 5. One account of the Sewanee game reads "Bradley Walker, full-back, is the strongest and heaviest player on the team." In the game against the Carlisle Indians he grabbed Hawley Pierce, Carlisle's biggest player, and carried him ten yards with him dangling over his shoulder. Walker was selected All-Southern in 1900 by W. H. Hoge.

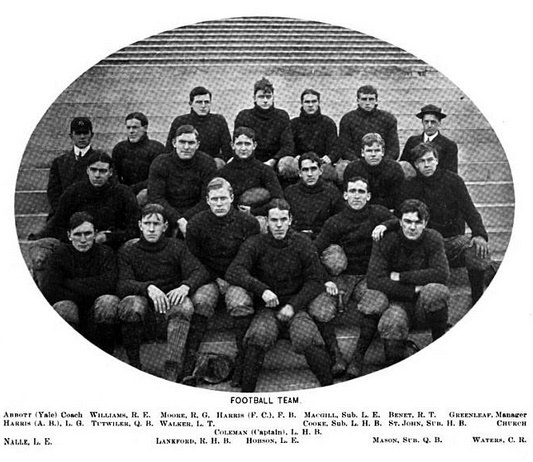
1901 Virginia football team

In 1901, the Cavaliers were again the Southern champion. Walker was the star of the Washington and Lee game on opening day, called by one writer the "star football player of the South". He scored a touchdown and kicked a 40-yard field goal in the win over rival VPI.

Caspar Whitney ranked Walker as perhaps the best player in the South, but said he had been playing football for more than four years if one were to include his time teaching at St. Albans in Radford, and so did not pick him. The Virginia faithful objected, saying this was not a common reason to rule one ineligible. The Palm of Alpha Tau Omega described Walker as "one of the all-time greats in Southern athletic history."

==== Baseball ====
A third baseman on the baseball team, he set a record in batting at Virginia. Writing in 1950, Nashville Banner sportswriter Bill Ezell said, "[Walker] established a record that hasn't been approached since and probably never will— a batting average of .492 over a two-year period".

== Nashville ==
Walker was secretary of the Nashville Park Board from 1902 to 1910. He began law practice in Nashville in 1903 with the firm of Champion, Brown and Akers. For thirty years he was an attorney for his alma mater Peabody College, and also represented churches and other Tennessee colleges in legislative matters.

Walker represented Tennessee Businessmen in the fight against sales tax and successfully represented merchants in opposing the use of convict labor. He was a leader in organizing the Tennessee Taxpayers Association in 1932 and served on its board for 10 years.

From 1940–42, Walker was chairman of the Red Cross drive in Nashville. In 1950, he made an unsuccessful bid for state office on the State Railroad and Public Utilities Commission, but it was a race where the winner of five candidates did not have a majority. This prompted Walker (who came in second) to run again that fall, but this time for the office of commissioner, as an independent candidate in the general election, but lost to John C. Hammer.

=== Football ===
The 1903 Nashville football team was disbanded, and then started back again with Walker as coach. After his playing days waned, Walker became interested in officiating major college football games and was awarded a "License of Efficiency" by the National Rules and Governing Body of collegiate football. He officiated football in the Nashville area for 25 years including many Southern football games, like the Michigan–Vanderbilt series beginning in 1907.

=== Baseball ===
In 1902, he played baseball at Highland Park (now Conger Park) in Jackson, Tennessee, as a member of the Memphis Chickasaw Club. In 1905, Walker and four other investors formed a company to raise money to field the Nashville Vols baseball team, buying the team from its original owner Newt Fisher. With Walker as president, they attempted to sell 100 shares of stock at $100 per share to support the team, but fell short of their goal. After cutting corners to remain solvent, the stock company finally placed the team up for sale in 1907. This happened to be the same year that Grantland Rice became a columnist on the sports page of The Tennessean. (Note: A larger group of new investors appeared, led by Ferdinand E. Kuhn, and raised $50,000. Advised by Rice, they re-structured the team's on-field management to pull the team out of last place and later began a new stadium, using the name "Sulphur Dell" which was coined by Rice.)

=== Tennis ===
Walker was the first president of the Nashville Tennis Club in 1903 and won the local championship several times.

=== Golf ===
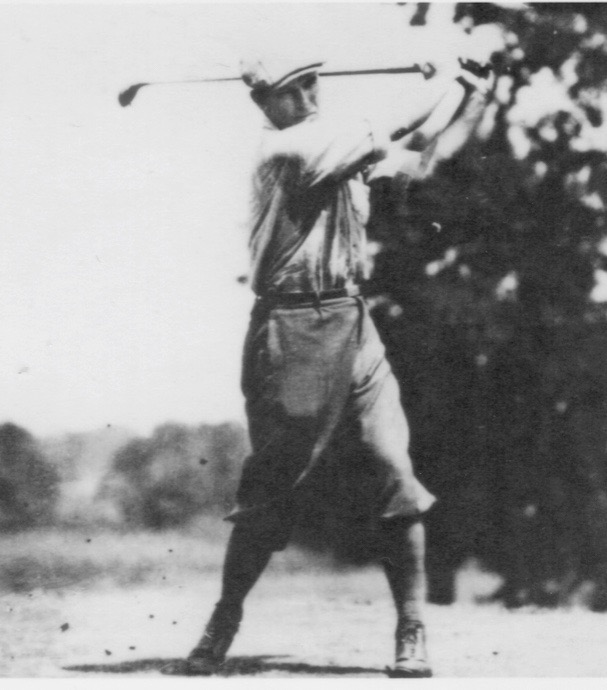
Bradley Walker, ca. 1913

In 1912, Walker was active in the Nashville Golf and Country Club and won the club golf championship in 1912, 1914, 1915, 1916, 1919, and 1928. According to historian Ridley Wills II, wooden tees had not been invented in those days, and each golfer would use sand and water to make a homemade tee. At age 37, Walker won Tennessee's state amateur golf championship (1914). He defeated McGhee Tyson (Note: Four years after this golf match, Charles McGhee Tyson had become a Navy pilot in World War I and was lost in a crash over the North Sea. The Knoxville Airport was named in his honor. His father was a Tennessee legislator and army general, Lawrence Davis Tyson.) of Knoxville. The newspaper account said, "Walker, not only a seasoned golfer of many tournaments' experience, but of athletic competitions of all kinds, bore up under the tension more ably than did the Cherokee [Country Club] finalist". Walker continued to compete in this same annual tournament for the next 36 years, until 1950, when he was too busy campaigning for political office. Years later Walker downplayed his state amateur golf victory saying, in effect, that he did not have any skilled young players competing with him back then.

During this time Grantland Rice took up the game of golf and got to know Walker at the Nashville Golf and Country Club. Rice took lessons from the club's pro Charlie Hall, hired in 1909. Rice began playing there regularly and said "I never dreamed that golf would provide so must grist for my typewriter". A few years later, Walker was in need of Rice's knowledge in order to find a golf pro after the existing pro, Samuel Aiken, died suddenly. Scottish golfer George Livingstone happened to hear of the situation and immediately applied for the position. Walker asked Grantland Rice to investigate Livingstone via a telegram, saying "...look him up and wire us". Rice's report was favorable, and Walker hired George Livingstone on May 12, 1912. Livingstone served as golf pro there for 36 years, retiring in 1948.

In 1914, when the club was moved to a new location, Walker served on the project committee, the golf course committee and was a long-time board member. The club moved to Belle Meade, a suburb of Nashville, and was renamed "Belle Meade Country Club" in 1921. In 1916, sportswriter Blinkey Horn claimed that the golf course "has no equal in the south".

== Personal life ==
Walker married Ethel Mathews on December 17, 1903, the daughter of publisher Andrew Francis Mathews of Nashville. They had two children: Bradley Walker Jr., who died in infancy, and Ethel Walker. Ethel Walker became a pediatrician and was one of the notable alumni of the Peabody Demonstration School (later University School of Nashville). The Walker family had a summer home at Monteagle Assembly Grounds.

Walker died February 3, 1951, in his apartment at 3415 West End Avenue in Nashville. He had collapsed in his automobile a few minutes earlier, with his daughter, Dr. Ethel Walker, in attendance. A cerebral hemorrhage was suspected. The service was at West End Methodist Church. He was buried at Mount Olivet Cemetery. Walker was a methodist, and politically a democrat. He was a 32nd degree Mason, a member of Eastern Star and served as district governor of the Tennessee Exchange Club. He was a member of Alpha Tau Omega social fraternity and a member of the Sons of Confederate Veterans.
