= Latta Park Baseball Field =

Former ballpark in Charlotte, North Carolina, US

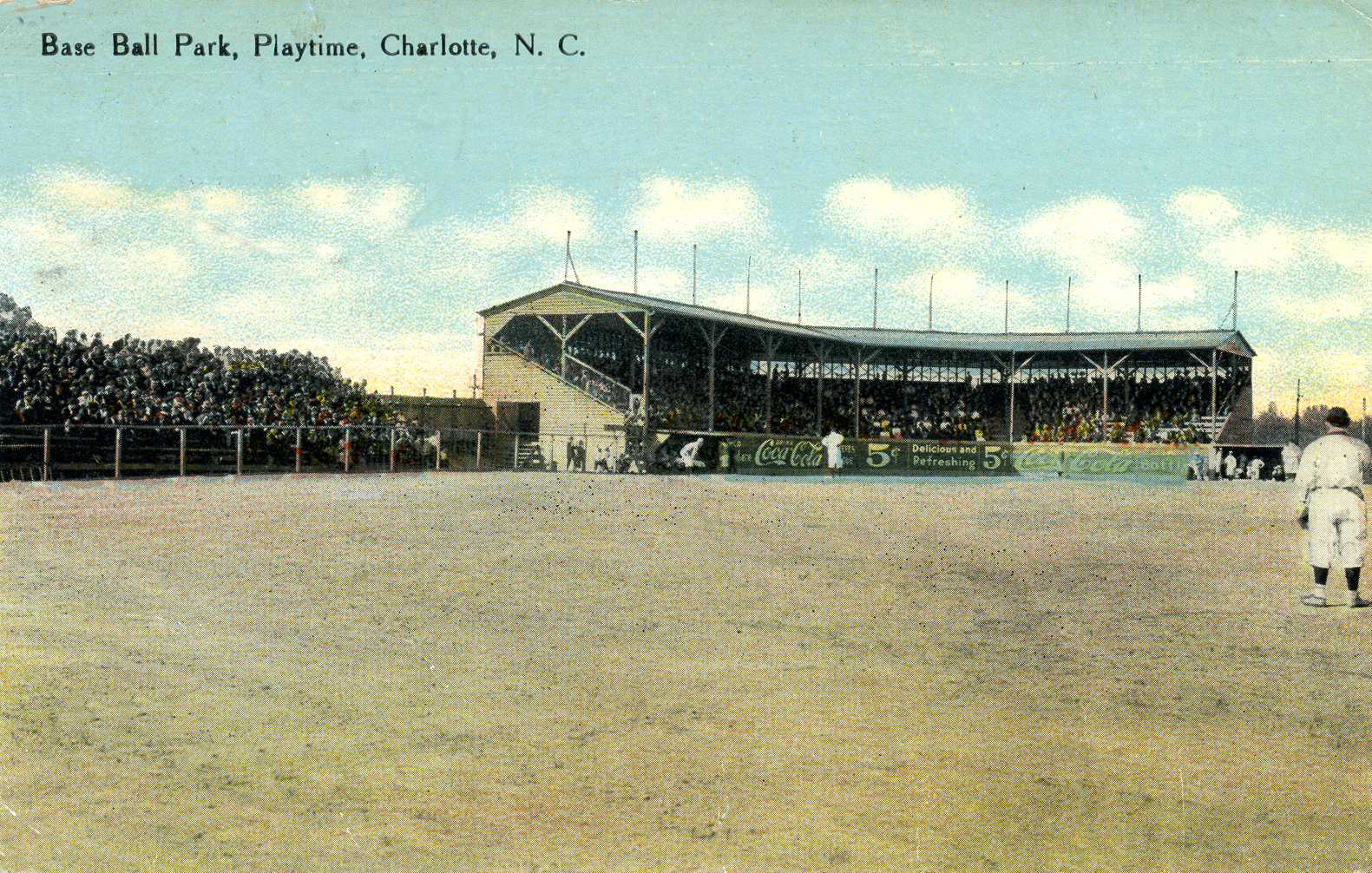
- Latta Park Baseball Field between 1908 and 1911
- Location: Lennox Ave & East Blvd; Charlotte, NC 28203
- Owner: Charlotte Consolidated Construction Company
- Capacity: 1,000
- Surface: Grass
- Field size: Left Field – ft Center Field – ft Right Field – ft

Construction
- Opened: May 20, 1891
- Renovated: 1892, 1897
- Closed: 1912

Tenants
- Davidson Wildcats (football) (1896-1903); Charlotte Hornets (VNCL) (1901, 1905), (CA) (1908); Brooklyn Dodgers (NL) (spring training) (1896-1897, 1901); Philadelphia Phillies (NL) (spring training) (1899–1900); Philadelphia Athletics (AL) (spring training) (1902)

The Latta Park Baseball Field was a ballpark located in Latta Park in Charlotte, North Carolina. Its capacity was approximately 1,000 for baseball.

Edward Dilworth Latta, Mayor F. B. McDowell, and others formed the Charlotte Consolidated Construction Company (the "Four Cs") in 1890 to develop the Dilworth neighborhood of Charlotte. To attract visitors and residents, the Four Cs constructed an electric trolley route at the end of which they built a recreational area called Latta Park with gardens, walking paths, a lake, and playing fields including the Latta Park Baseball Field.

The first game was played at the park's grand opening on May 20, 1891 with a game between teams from Winston, North Carolina and Columbia, South Carolina. A grandstand for the baseball field was built in 1892, and the field renovated and rededicated in September 1897. As of 1899, a third of a mile bicycle track encircled the playing field.

Latta Park Baseball Field was home to the Charlotte Hornets minor-league baseball team until the opening of Wearn Field in 1912.

The first college football game in Charlotte was played at Latta Park in 1892 when the University of North Carolina defeated Virginia Tech 32–5.

Davidson College played football games at the Latta Park Baseball Field between 1896 and 1903.

On November 28, 1901, Clemson defeated the University of North Carolina in football at Latta Park in front of 1,000 fans.

Charlotte and Latta Park hosted the Brooklyn Dodgers for spring training in 1896, 1897, and 1901; the Philadelphia Phillies in 1899 and 1900; and the Philadelphia Athletics in 1902.

As the Dilworth neighborhood grew, the Four Cs made plans to redevelop recreational areas of Latta Park. The Charlotte Hornets had played at Latta Park through the 1908 season but moved to the newly opened Wearn Field constructed and managed by the team's owner, J.H. Wearn. The Charlotte Baseball Association had signed a ten-year lease to use Latta Park's Baseball Field and played games at Latta Park through the 1912 season.

Latta Park is commemorated at Charlotte's Truist Field along the outer wall of South Graham Street.
