= Richard Dudley =

Richard Dudley may refer to:

- Richard Dudley (1518–1593), miner
- Richard M. Dudley (1938–2020), professor of mathematics
- Richard Houston Dudley (1836–1914), American politician, Confederate soldier and businessman
- Dick Dudley (1915–2000), American radio and television announcer
