= Ferdinand E. Kuhn =

American shoe merchant and sports executive

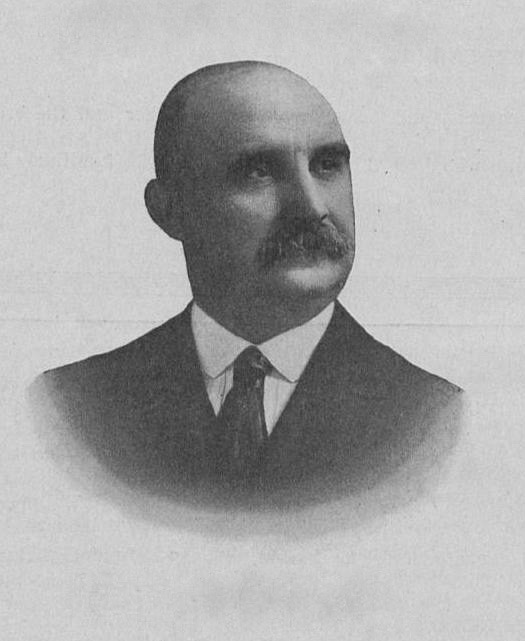
- Kuhn c. 1915
- Born: September 3, 1861; Nashville, Tennessee, US
- Died: March 17, 1930 (aged 68); Nashville, Tennessee, US
- Education: University of Notre Dame
- Occupation: Shoe merchant
- Employer(s): Kuhn, Cooper, & Geary
- Known for: "Father of the Knights of Columbus in the South."; President of 1908 Nashville Vols
- Spouse: Kate Wall
- Children: 9, including Oliver Wall Kuhn

Ferdinand Emery Kuhn (September 3, 1861 – March 17, 1930) was a shoe merchant known as the "Father of the Knights of Columbus in the South." He was also president of the 1908 Southern Association champion Nashville Vols baseball team.

== Early years ==
Kuhn was born in Nashville, Tennessee, on September 3, 1861, to German immigrants from the Kingdom of Württemberg, Ferdinand and Barbara (Müller) Kuhn. He was the youngest of eight children. His father was a brewer who ran the Rock City Brewery shortly after the end of the Civil War.

=== Studies ===
Kuhn attended the local parochial and public high schools, graduating from Hume High School, then went to the University of Notre Dame, where he was a member of the University Baseball Association and the "Lemonnier Boat Club", a boat and rowing club on Saint Joseph's Lake. He studied chemistry, physics, and surveying, graduating in 1883 with a BSc. (Note: At Notre Dame, Kuhn was a classmate of aeronautical expert Albert Francis Zahm.) Kuhn would present the gold medal given to the best science undergraduate at Notre Dame, and was given an honorary master's degree in 1895.

== Personal ==
Kuhn was married to Katherine "Kate" Wall on April 15, 1885, in her hometown of Springfield, Kentucky. The marriage was performed by Joseph A. Hogarty, whose father assisted with the Henry Clay monument in Lexington. Kate Wall had attended Saint Mary's Academy, and was born in Wall, Pennsylvania, named for her father Frank Wall, a wealthy farmer and steamboat engineer from Ireland.

They had nine children; six boys and three girls. Kuhn was the father of prominent Vanderbilt quarterback Doc Kuhn and, through another son, violinist Casper, the grandfather of NBC radio and television announcer Dick Dudley. Kuhn named yet another son Richard Dudley after Richard Houston Dudley.

Kuhn's house from 1898 until his death is now called Frassati House, and is the building on Vanderbilt's campus that houses the University's Catholic campus ministry. Kuhn was an active member of the Cathedral of the Incarnation. His mother had also attended the Church of the Assumption.

== Board of Public Works ==
Kuhn's first job out of college was as the private secretary to Mayor Claiborne Hooper Phillips. His brother Casper was city auditor. Ferdinand Kuhn was then a secretary and city recorder for the Board of Public Works and Affairs from 1884 until 1903. Upon his resignation he was dubbed "beyond question the most capable man that (sic) ever served the Board".

== Knights of Columbus ==
=== Initiation ===
Kuhn was initiated into the Knights of Columbus, a Catholic fraternal service organization, in Louisville, Kentucky, on July 1, 1899. He was one of the first five from south of Louisville to be initiated on that day. The other four were: Messrs. H. J. Grimes, Will J. Varley, William Smith, and Michael M. McCormack.

=== Southern expansion ===
Ferdinand Kuhn was one of the Nashville Catholics who had advocated expansion into Tennessee. The 1900 compromise allowed for the formation of Nashville Council No. 544. Kuhn, who became Tennessee's first State Deputy, succeeded Daniel J. Callahan as the master ceremonialist, presiding at the institution ceremonies of councils in Florida (1900), Alabama (1902), Louisiana (1902), and Georgia (1902). His degree work at the opening of New Orleans Council No. 714 in November 1902 was long remembered as 'something out of this world'.

He was appointed by Supreme Knight Edward L. Hearn as the first Territorial Deputy of Tennessee, and in that capacity organized councils in Memphis, Knoxville, and Chattanooga in Tennessee; Atlanta and Augusta in Georgia; Birmingham, Mobile, and Huntsville in Alabama; Meridian, Mississippi; New Orleans, Louisiana; Little Rock and Fort Smith in Arkansas. He was once Master of the Fourth Degree for Georgia, Alabama, Mississippi, Louisiana, and Arkansas, Later he remained Master of the Fourth Degree for Tennessee. He is known as the "Father of the Knights of Columbus in the South."

=== State deputy ===
Kuhn was the first state deputy of Tennessee from 1902 to 1908. Since 1903, the F. E. Kuhn sword has passed from State Deputy to State Deputy. In 1920 Kuhn was Grand Knight of Nashville Council 544.

== Shoe merchant ==
Storefront

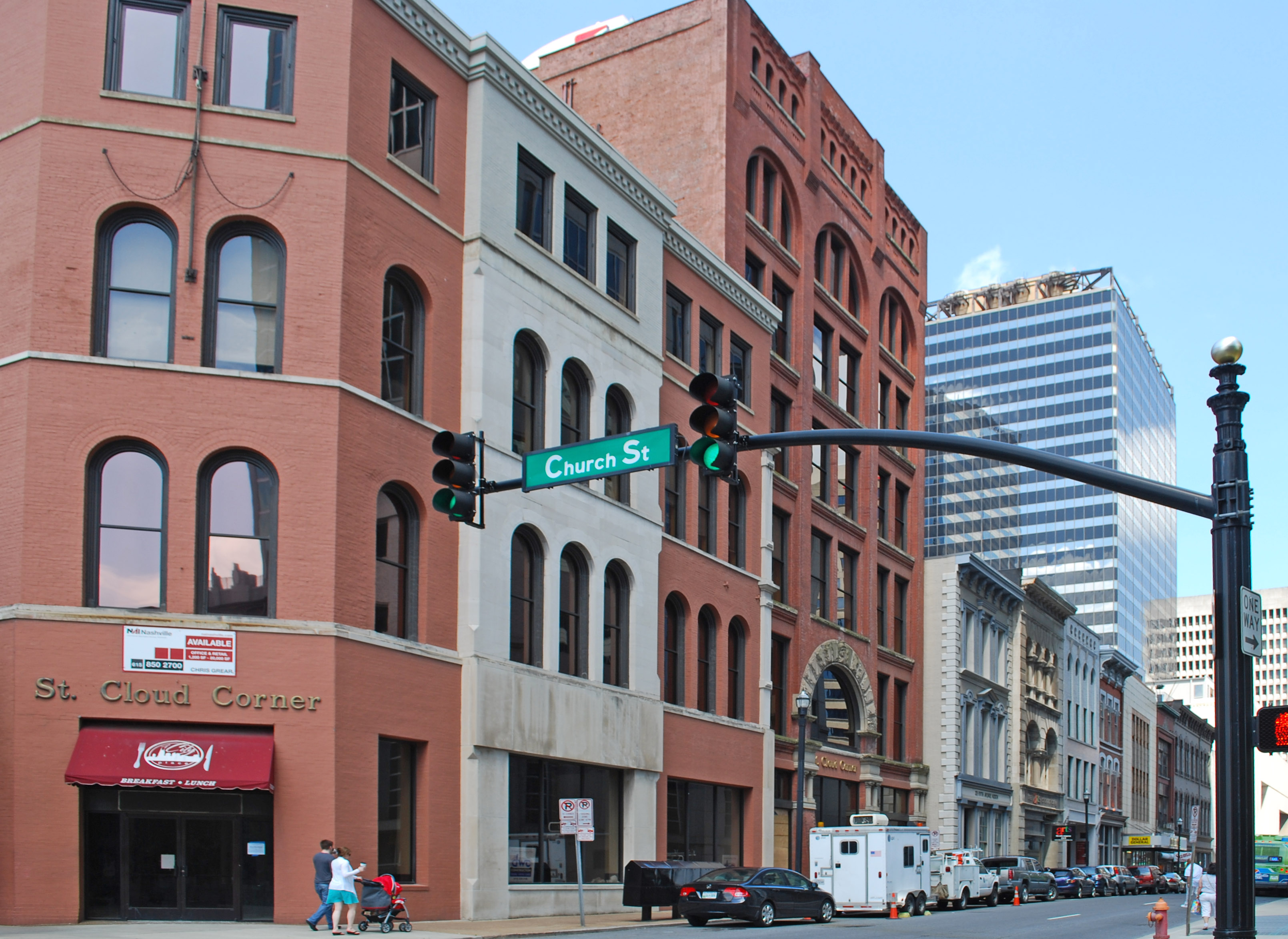
Fifth Ave North, Nashville

Kuhn was president and treasurer of the Kuhn, Cooper, Geary & Company shoe store, founded in 1903 with Ed P. Cooper and P. J. Geary. The store was located on North Summer Street (Fifth Avenue North), Nashville.

It was once the largest retail shoe store in the South, and earned a reputation as the premiere footwear store in downtown Nashville. The most up-to-date electric lighting and holophone reflectors provided lighting for the store. Its front window displayed shoes on revolving pedestals. The inside walls were marble lined, and inlaid mirrors ran along the back wall.

Kuhn was the president of the Retail Shoe Dealers' Association in 1906, and of the Retail Credit Men's Association in 1920. In 1921 he was awarded a trophy for his work in gaining members as chairman in Tennessee for the Retail Credit Men's Association.

== Nashville Vols ==
Kuhn was the president of the Nashville Vols baseball club from 1908 to 1910, including the 1908 Southern Association championship team.

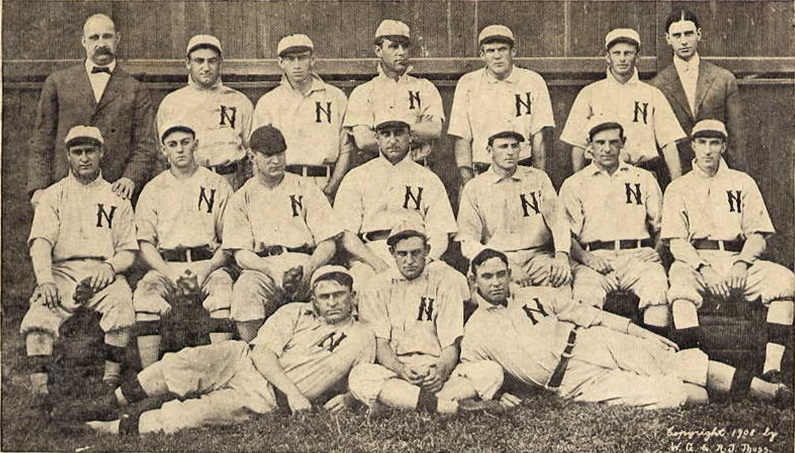
The 1908 Nashville Vols. Kuhn is top left.

He was preceded in that capacity by Bradley Walker. Kuhn was head of a group of men who purchased the team after a last place finish in 1907. Along with Kuhn the group consisted of: James B. Carr (president of B. H. Stief Jewelry Co.); Thomas James Tyne (lawyer and state legislator); J. T. Connor (real estate); James A. Bowling (contractor); Robert L. Bolling (lawyer); Rufus E. Fort (physician); and William G. Hirsig (automobile and tire dealer). Well known attorney S. A. Champion supplied legal services. The group envisioned an ambitious project of stadium renovations at Sulphur Dell, and managed to cull $50,000. Kuhn was selected to head the Board of Directors. He went on a trip to Ponce de Leon Park in Atlanta to observe a modern park and plan renovations.

=== 1908–1910 ===
Kuhn hired Bill Bernhard as manager. In 1908 the team won the Southern pennant by beating the New Orleans Pelicans in the last game, described by Grantland Rice as the "greatest game ever played in Dixie".

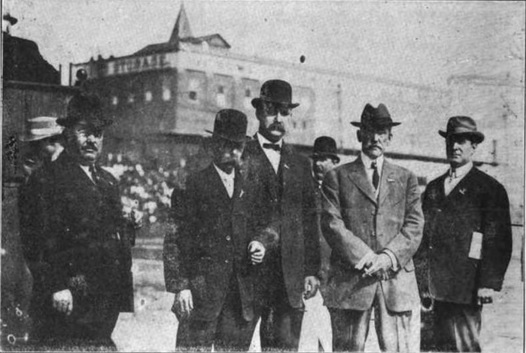
Kuhn (middle) with Southern Association president William Marmaduke Kavanaugh (left)

Nashville entered the final day of that season on September 19 with an opportunity to win the league pennant. The championship would be decided by the last game of the season at Sulphur Dell. Both teams had the same number of losses (56), but the Pelicans were in first place with 76 wins to the Vols' second-place 74. A crowd of 11,000 spectators, including Kuhn, who sat next to Mayor James Stephens Brown, saw Carl Sitton hurl a three-hit, 1–0 shutout, giving Nashville their third Southern Association pennant by 0.1 percentage points (57.25% to 57.14%). Ted Breitenstein was New Orleans's pitcher.

One account reads: "By one run, by one point, Nashville has won the Southern League pennant, nosing New Orleans out literally by an eyelash. Saturday's game, which was the deciding one, between Nashville and New Orleans was the greatest exhibition of the national game ever seen in the south and the finish in the league race probably sets a record in baseball history."

The championship banner was presented to Kuhn by league president William Marmaduke Kavanaugh, and it hung over the window of Kuhn's shoe store until the banner raising ceremony on Opening Day, 1909.

Kuhn also invented a kind of electric scoreboard. In the 1909 season, New Orleans, Mobile, Montgomery, Memphis, and Atlanta used his design. John Heisman was president of the 1909 champion Atlanta team.

Following the 1910 season, Kuhn resigned as the team's president. He was succeeded by Hirsig. Kuhn was always careful with the team's money, and one newspaper called it the end of the "tightwad" regime.

Hub Perdue, former pitcher for the 1908 Nashville Volunteers, worked briefly at Kuhn's shoe store in 1921.

== Other community service ==
He was once president of Tennessee's state Anti-Tuberculosis League, established in 1906. He led the Red Cross Christmas seal drive in Tennessee in 1911. He was also on the Board of Directors of the Tennessee Association for the Relief of Ex-Convicts, established in 1917. (Note: Luke Lea and James G. Stahlman served on the Board in the next term.)
