= The 1995/1996 NFL Interactive Yearbook =

- Developer: RealTime Sports Inc
- Release: August 1995
- Operating system: Macintosh; Windows

The 1995/1996 NFL Interactive Yearbook is a software CD-ROM from RealTime Sports.

== Summary ==
The 1995/1996 NFL Interactive Yearbook features week-by-week reviews of the 1994 season, previews of the 1995 games, and articles about the two NFL expansion teams.

== Development ==
The 1995/1996 NFL Interactive Yearbook was developed by RealTime Sports, a company founded in 1993. It was released for Macintosh and Windows.

NBC announcer Phil Simms, who quarterbacked two New York Giants teams to Super Bowl victories, is the host of the CD-ROM.

== Reception ==
CNET recommended it to any sports fan's collection.
