= Frank Wall (steamboat engineer) =

Irish-American steamboat engineer (1810–1896)

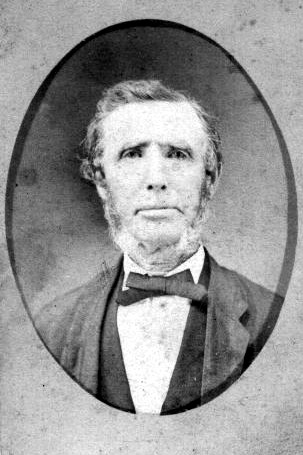
- Born: January 4, 1810; County Londonderry, Ireland
- Died: July 3, 1896 (aged 86); Pittsburgh, Pennsylvania
- Occupation: Steamboat engineer
- Known for: Founder of Wall, Pennsylvania
- Spouse: Catherine Agnes Kelly
- Children: 8

Francis Xavier Wall (January 4, 1810 – July 3, 1896) was a steamboat engineer and millionaire considered the founder of the town of Wall, Pennsylvania, near Pittsburgh. He sold his land to the Pennsylvania Railroad, who built the first railroad station in the area, Wall's Station. He died when he was struck by a train at the station.

== Early years in Ireland ==
Francis Xavier Wall was born on January 4, 1810, in County Londonderry, Ireland to Michael Walls and Margaret McKee.

=== Emigration ===
He emigrated to America with his mother in 1822. His father went in 1810. He early left his father's home near Pittsburgh and worked on railroads and on the Pennsylvania Canal. His first job at the age of 18 was as a teamster for the Pennsylvania Railroad Company.

== Steamboat engineer ==
He had a natural inclination for mechanics and turned his efforts to engine making until obtaining a position as an engineer on steamboats on the Mississippi River. He would go from Pittsburgh to New Orleans and the Gulf of Mexico, also traversing the Chattahoochee and Apalachicola Rivers of Georgia and Florida, including during the Seminole Wars. He served in this capacity seventeen or eighteen years. One of the boats he rode on as engineer was the Hyperion. Another was the Cuba, of which he was also half-owner.

=== Marriage ===
Wall was married to Catherine Agnes Kelly of Columbus, Georgia, about 1846. Her family came from Dungannon in County Tyrone.

== Wall, Pennsylvania ==
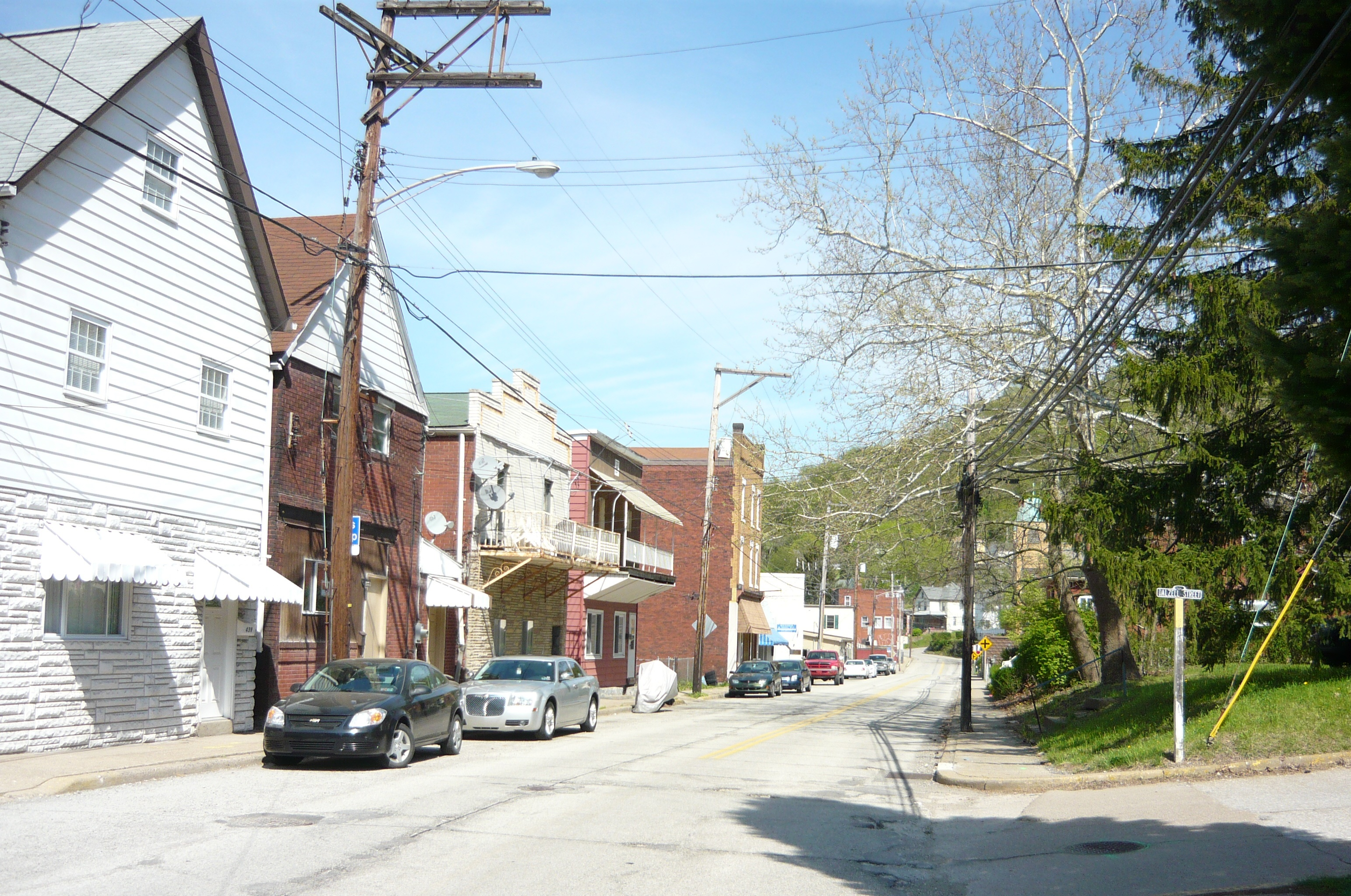
Business district of Wall, Pennsylvania

=== Eponymous city and station ===
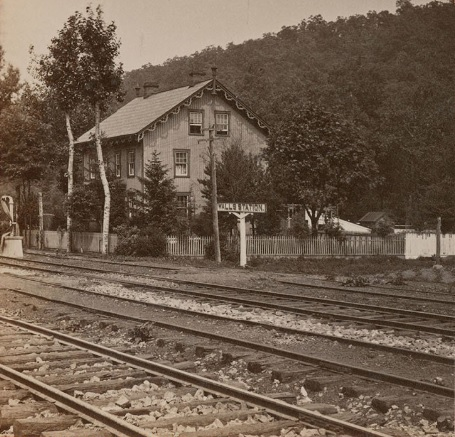
Wall's Station by Frederick Gutekunst

Wall is located at the site of a farm purchased by James Walls in 1829. The property, on the south bank of Turtle Creek, just outside of Pittsburgh. It was passed to James' sons Henry and John Walls, who lived in a log cabin near the heart of present-day Wall.

A station on the Pennsylvania Railroad opened in the early 1840s, which was named "Walls' Station" in honor of the Walls family. Eventually, the name of the station and the town that grew up around it was shortened to "Wall Station". One source reads "Wall's station is a depot for wood and water of the second class." Another reads, it "is the limit for the local accommodation trains from Pittsburgh."

Henry and John Walls sold their property to their cousin Frank, who developed the property around the station. The town then shortened to Wall after Frank, whose property development led to him being the owner of the first two houses erected in the region.

=== Return to Pennsylvania ===
He returned around 1848 to Wall to farm when not much later his father died. On his return he had purchased a two hundred and fifty acre farm adjoining his father's for the consideration of $4,900. This farm also abutted the right of way of the main line of the Pennsylvania Railroad which purchased five to ten acres until purchasing the remaining bottom lands in the late 1860s for $40,000. One calculation put his profits in excess of $180,000.

== Springfield, Kentucky ==
The selling of the farm to the Pennsylvania Railroad making him quite wealthy; he went to Springfield, Kentucky. After apparently spending some time at the home of his wife in Columbus, he took the train to Louisville and from there walked appraising the countryside until some 50 miles (80 km) later arriving at Springfield. There he attended the auction of a farm for sale, paying in cash taken from under his hat. In Springfield he owned racehorses.

== Death ==
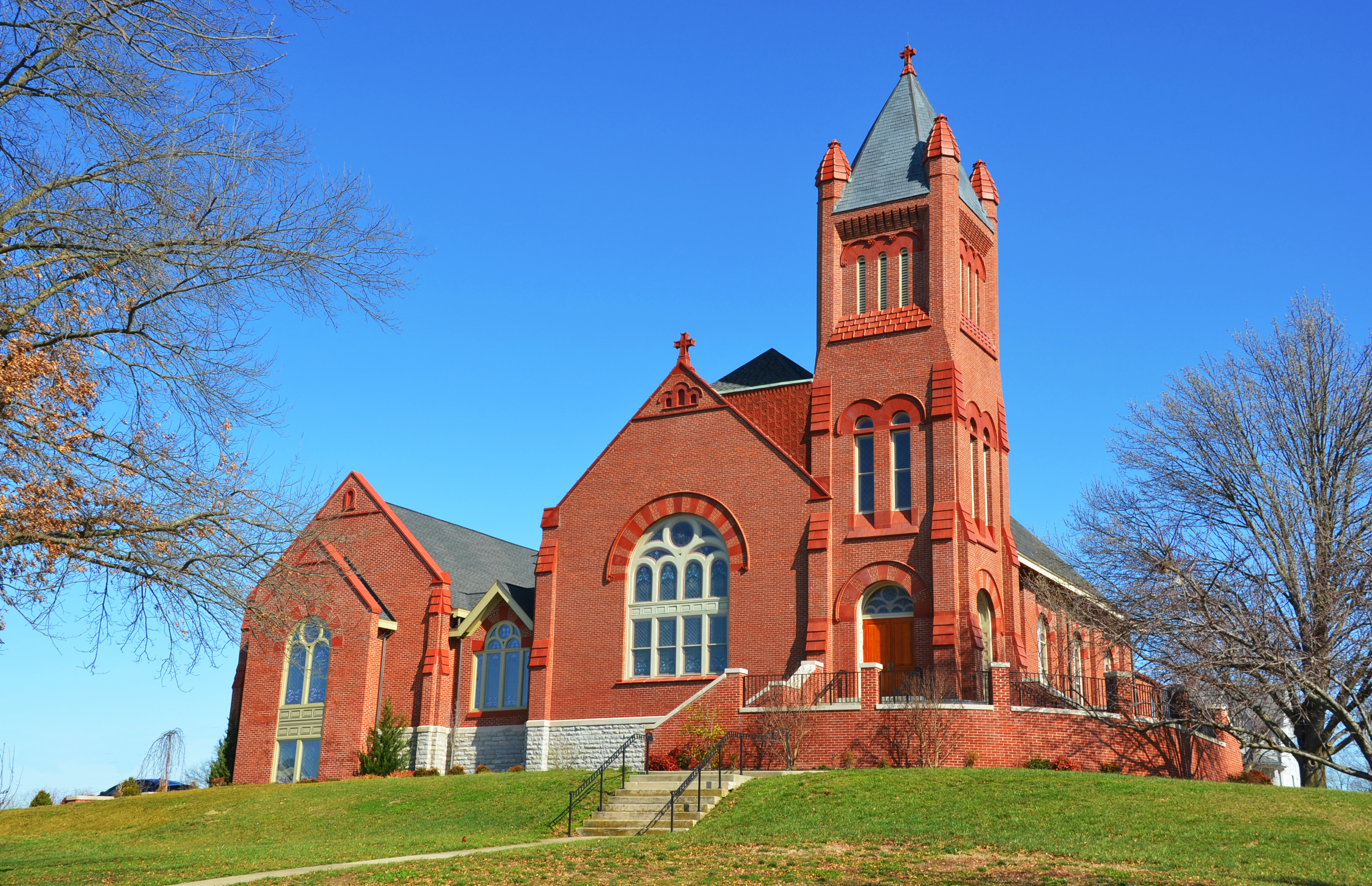
Saint Dominic's

On July 3, 1896, Wall, came to Pittsburgh from his home in Springfield, Kentucky to close up a real estate transaction with the Pennsylvania Railroad Company involving about $30,000. He also came to visit relatives. Arriving at the station which bore his name, Wall, who was hard of hearing, had just started to walk along the track when he was hit by another railroad train and crushed to death in sight of many onlookers. He was a millionaire at the time of his death. Many knew him as "Uncle Frank." He is buried at Saint Dominics Cemetery in Springfield, Kentucky with a large angel atop his gravestone.

=== Will ===
He left an extensive will. To his son Michael, he left a farm known as the Powell farm of 240 acres; $4500 stock in the Peoples Deposit Bank and a Washington County bond of $1,000. To his son John he left the Yates farm in Washington county covering 225 acres and $1,000 Washington County bond. To his daughter "Lottie" Simms he left the Walls home place containing 230 acres. To Kate Wall Kuhn, he left 55 acres of land in Jefferson County, adjoining the city of Louisville. To miss Fannie Wall he gave all of his real estate in Columbus, Georgia and $4,000 in cash. To Bell Wall he left property in Springfield known as the Central Hotel property and $2,000 in cash. To Frank Wall Jr he left all of his lots at Spring Hill, near Wall. He divided the property at Wall alike amongst all the children. The executors of the will were Frank Wall Jr and two sons-in law, Ben F. Simms and Ferdinand E. Kuhn.

== Personal ==
Wall was a devout Roman Catholic, and his first daughter was a nun. His son F. X. Wall Jr. and son-in-law Ferdinand Kuhn both attended Notre Dame. Wall is the great-great-grandfather of former New York Giants quarterback Phil Simms.
