= William G. Hirsig =

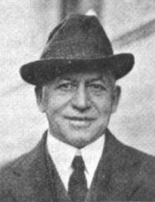
- Born: December 28, 1868; Monroe, Wisconsin
- Died: April 4, 1924 (aged 55); Nashville, Tennessee
- Occupation: Automobile dealer
- Known for: President of Nashville Vols

William Grimm Hirsig (December 28, 1868 – April 4, 1924) was an automobile dealer in Nashville, Tennessee, a partner of J. B. Deeds in the firm Deeds & Hirsig. He was once president of the Nashville Vols baseball team. He was also a member of the county workhouse board.

== Early life ==
Hirsig was born to William and Elizabeth Grimm Hirsig, natives of Switzerland, in Monroe, Wisconsin.

== Baseball ==
Hirsig was president of the Vols from 1911 to 1913, succeeding Ferdinand E. Kuhn. When Ty Cobb visited Nashville, Hirsig drove him around.

== Personal ==
On July 6, 1893, he married Josephine McBride. In 1895, he came to Nashville. His sons Lawrence and James were instrumental in their uncle Curtis Haley bringing the Boy Scouts to Tennessee. Hirsig's house, known as "Zenaida" and positioned between where the armies were during the Battle of Nashville during the American Civil War, was destroyed by fire in 1918. On his death on April 4, 1924, he left all his property to his wife. He owned horses.
