= Dick Dudley =

American actor

- Born: Casper Bernard Kuhn Jr. April 22, 1915; Louisville, Kentucky
- Died: February 2, 2000 (aged 84); Lancaster, Pennsylvania
- Occupations: Radio and television announcer
- Years active: 1925–1985

Richard Allen Dudley (birth name: Casper Bernard Kuhn Jr.) (April 22, 1915 – February 2, 2000) was an American radio and television announcer once known as "the voice of NBC".

== Early years ==
Dudley's father was Casper Bernard Kuhn Sr. and his mother was Aida Perisutti, both of Nashville. His mother's parents came from Forni di Sopra in Italy. His father was a son of Ferdinand E. Kuhn, and brother of Oliver Kuhn, who like his brother attended Vanderbilt University. He played as a catcher on the baseball team in 1911 with Ray Morrison. He was also an accomplished violinist. Another brother and Vanderbilt grad was Richard Dudley Kuhn, named for Richard Houston Dudley.

== Radio and tv announcer ==
Dudley's career began in 1925 on a children's radio program on WTNT radio in Nashville. Following graduation from high school, he started a repertory company in a renovated barn, and wrote plays, some of which featured a young Dinah Shore.

=== NBC ===
He later became an announcer and sound effects engineer on WSM (AM). He broadcast flood-relief during the Ohio River Flood of 1937; and in 1938 moved to New York City where, after holding several jobs, he joined NBC as a page, moving up the ranks to the position in staff announcer in 1940. He was among the first to announce the attack on Pearl Harbor on December 7, 1941. Due to World War II, Dudley was drafted into the Army in 1943, and served as program director of the American Forces Network in London. He was on the "duffle bag" radio program which played requested songs and was listened to by the troops.

Dudley returned to NBC after the war, where he announced on such radio shows as The Adventures of Archie Andrews, The Aldrich Family, The Catholic Hour, The Jack Benny Show and The Eternal Light. Dudley was also host of recorded-music programs on WNBC radio. His television announcing credits included the original 1949 TV version of Ripley's Believe It or Not!, Arturo Toscanini's television concerts, the original 1950s version of The Price Is Right (as a substitute announcer), The Today Show, and Not for Women Only. In addition, he also handled local booth announcing work, including public service announcements, for NBC's New York outlet WNBC-TV.

He retired from NBC in 1985. Dudley died of a brain tumor at age 84.
