= Phil Simms =

American football player and sportscaster (born 1955)

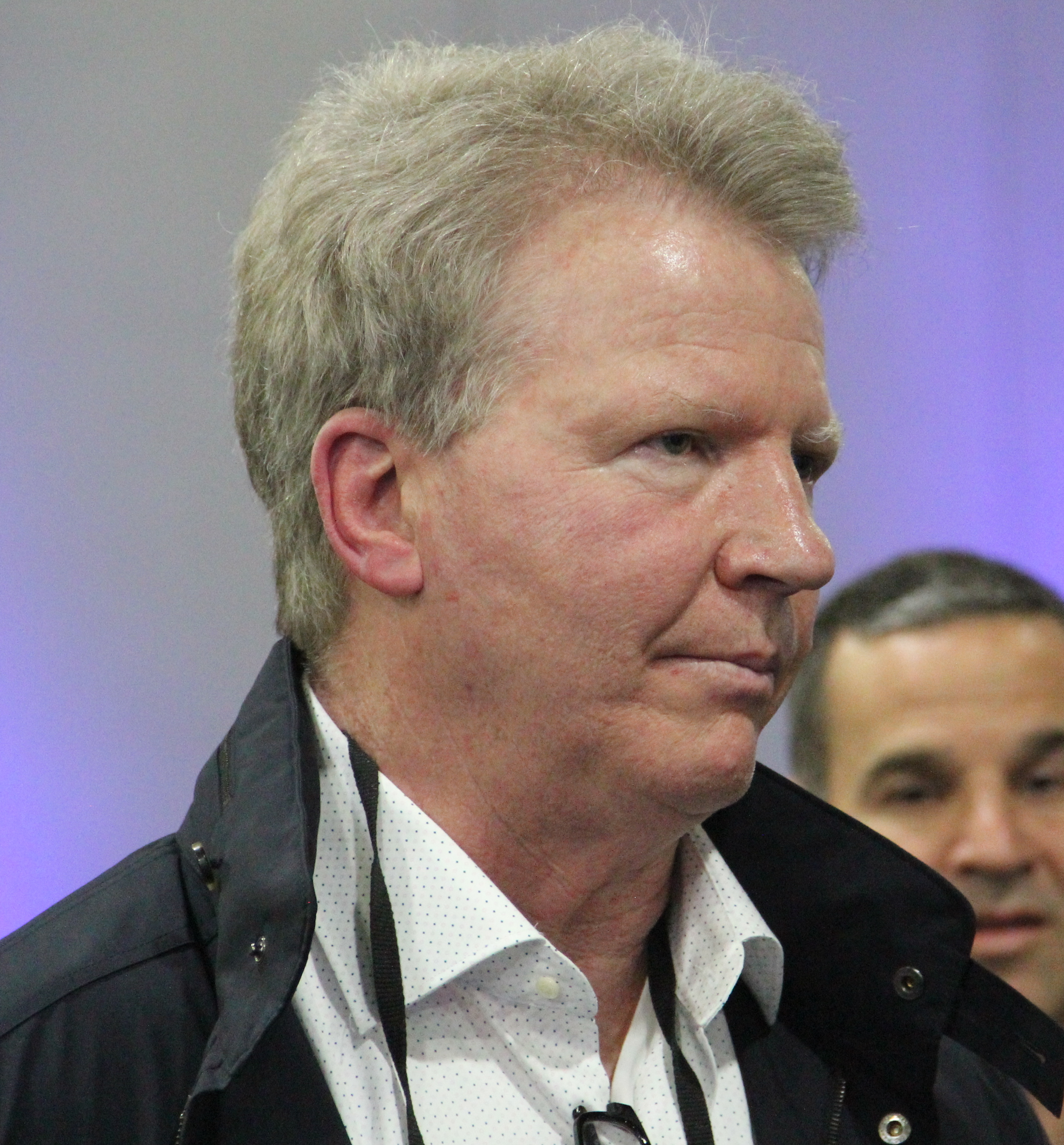
- Simms in 2019

No. 11
- Position: Quarterback

Personal information
- Born: November 3, 1955 (age 71); Springfield, Kentucky, U.S.
- Listed height: 6 ft 3 in (1.91 m)
- Listed weight: 216 lb (98 kg)

Career information
- High school: Southern (Louisville, Kentucky)
- College: Morehead State (1974–1978)
- NFL draft: 1979: 1st round, 7th overall pick

Career history
- New York Giants (1979–1993)

Awards and highlights
- 2× Super Bowl champion (XXI, XXV); Super Bowl MVP (XXI); 2× Pro Bowl (1985, 1993); Walter Payton NFL Man of the Year (1993); Jim Thorpe Trophy (1986); NEA First-team All-Pro (1986); PFWA All-Rookie Team (1979); New York Giants Ring of Honor; New York Giants No. 11 retired; 11th greatest New York Giant of all-time; NFL records: Highest completion percentage in a Super Bowl (minimum 14 pass attempts): 88%, Super Bowl XXI; Highest passer rating in a Super Bowl (minimum 14 pass attempts): 150.9, Super Bowl XXI

Career NFL statistics
- Passing attempts: 4,647
- Passing completions: 2,576
- Completion percentage: 55.4%
- TD–INT: 199–157
- Passing yards: 33,462
- Passer rating: 78.8
- Stats at Pro Football Reference

Phillip Martin Simms (born November 3, 1955) is an American former professional football quarterback who played in the National Football League (NFL) for 14 seasons with the New York Giants. After playing college football for the Morehead State Eagles, Simms was selected in the first round by the Giants as the seventh overall pick in the 1979 NFL draft. Simms was named Most Valuable Player (MVP) of Super Bowl XXI, after he led the Giants to a 39–20 win over the Denver Broncos and set the record for highest completion percentage in a Super Bowl, completing 22 of 25 passes (88%), as well as the highest passer rating in a Super Bowl at 150.9; both of these records still stand. He was also named to the Pro Bowl for his performances in the 1985 and 1993 seasons.

He finished his career with 33,462 passing yards and would go on to be a career broadcaster of NFL games—first as an analyst for ESPN, then as an in-game color commentator with NBC and CBS. He left CBS in 2024. He is the father of former NFL quarterback, assistant coach, and current NFL football analyst Chris Simms and former quarterback Matt Simms.

== Early life ==
Simms was born in Springfield, Kentucky, on his grandfather's farm, a place now called Maple Hill Manor in Washington County, where he attended St. Dominic's Elementary. While in elementary school, his family moved to Louisville and he went to St. Rita Catholic grade school. Simms was the quarterback of the Trojans of Southern High School in Louisville and graduated in 1974.

Simms is a descendent of millionaire Frank Wall, and a relative of two older college football players Doc Kuhn, who played for Vanderbilt, and Shipwreck Kelly, who played for Kentucky.

== College career ==
Simms chose to attend NCAA Division I FCS (formerly Division 1 AA) Morehead State of the Ohio Valley Conference in nearby Morehead.

The Morehead State Eagles ran a ball-control offense, and Simms' numbers were unspectacular—in his senior season he completed 92 of 173 passes for a 53.2% completion percentage and had six touchdown passes, 11 interceptions, and 1,229 yards. The Ohio Valley moved up to the new Division I-AA in 1978, but the Eagles went 2–6–1; they failed to make the postseason during his college career. Simms finished with 409 completions in 835 attempts for a 48.9% completion percentage. He also totaled 32 touchdowns, 45 interceptions, and a school-record 5,545 yards. Morehead State renamed its football venue of Jayne Stadium to Phil Simms Stadium prior to the Eagles' 2025 homecoming game on October 18.

== Professional career ==
=== NFL draft ===
Before the 1979 NFL draft, new San Francisco 49ers head coach Bill Walsh flew to Morehead State with assistant coach Sam Wyche to work out Simms. Walsh was so impressed that he planned to draft Simms in the third round, preferring him over the quarterback they ultimately took, Joe Montana of Notre Dame. But the New York Giants decided to make Simms their first round pick (seventh overall) to the surprise of many. As Simms acknowledged, "most people have never heard of me." When Simms's name was announced by Commissioner Pete Rozelle in front of the audience at the draft in New York, his selection was booed loudly by the Giants fans in attendance. He was the second quarterback taken; Jack Thompson of Washington State went to Cincinnati with the third overall pick. Simms was not then happy being a Giant either, "All I was thinking was which teams I would rather play for—the Green Bay Packers, the Kansas City Chiefs, San Diego, San Francisco..." But he became popular with his teammates, who jokingly dubbed him "Prince Valiant" in his rookie training camp.

=== Rookie year ===
Simms won the first five starts of his rookie year in 1979; finishing with a 6–4 record, threw for 1,743 yards and 13 touchdown passes, and was named to the NFL All-Rookie Team. He was runner-up for Rookie of the Year, behind future teammate Ottis Anderson.

=== Early career: 1980–1986 ===
Simms' next four years were marred by injuries and inconsistent play. He finished the 1980 season with 15 touchdowns and 19 interceptions, while completing a subpar 48.0% of his passes for 2,321 yards. In 1981, Simms threw for 2,031 yards, 11 touchdowns, and 9 interceptions on 54.4% completion percentage before suffering a separated shoulder in a November 15 loss to the Washington Redskins. With Simms out, the Giants went on a run led by Scott Brunner and advanced to the second round of the playoffs. Simms suffered a torn knee ligament in a preseason game against the New York Jets, preventing him from playing the entire 1982 season. Following the season, Ray Perkins resigned as head coach to take over the same position at the University of Alabama, and was replaced by the team's defensive coordinator Bill Parcells. In the coming years this change would prove crucial to the Giants and Simms.

One of Parcells' first decisions as coach was to replace Simms as the starting quarterback with Brunner. Simms asked to be traded after the benching, but his request was ignored. During the sixth game of the Giants' 1983 Season, Simms came in to replace the struggling Brunner against the Philadelphia Eagles. On his third drive, Simms suffered a season-ending injury when the thumb on his throwing hand hit a player's helmet on his follow-through. The injury was reported as a dislocation, but according to the book, Simms to McConkey, written by Phil McConkey, Simms, and Dick Schaap, the injury was much more severe, with the thumb literally hanging off after impact, and the bone sticking out through the skin.

During his first few years on the team, Giants fans were merciless in their treatment of Simms, who they felt was a disappointment. He commented that his wife "had to sit up in the stands and listen to them cuss me." However, in 1984, after many seasons plagued by injuries and up-and-down play, Simms finally emerged as a team offensive leader. During his 1983 injury, offensive coordinator Ron Erhardt talked Simms into watching more game film, something he had not regularly done in college or the pros. He gained a better understanding of NFL defenses, his team's formations, and pass protection schemes, and improved his ability to audible at the line of scrimmage. He also changed his strength training regimen in an attempt to make his body more resistant to injury. He passed for 4,044 yards (second most in the National Football Conference (NFC)), 22 touchdown passes, and led the Giants to a playoff berth.

He was voted to the Pro Bowl and named Pro Bowl MVP as he led the NFC to a comeback win over the American Football Conference (AFC) by throwing three touchdowns. In 1985, he passed for 3,829 yards, 22 touchdowns, and led the Giants to 10 victories, the most for a Giants team since 1963. In a game against the Cincinnati Bengals during the 1985 season, Simms passed for 513 yards—the fifth most passing yards in a single game in NFL history. In 1986, he passed for 3,487 yards and 21 touchdown passes during a season in which the Giants won 14 games. In week 11, he completed a desperate fourth-and-17 pass to Bobby Johnson late in the game to set up Raul Allegre's game-winning field goal, which gave the Giants a 22–20 victory over the Minnesota Vikings. Simms later commented:

It's my favorite game in my career, because it's everything I always wanted to be as a player. I wanted to be tough, making big throws, immune to pressure, not worried about outcomes. It was truly like standing on the tee box in golf and there's trees on each side and water and you just go 'Man, I'm gonna rip it down the middle.' And no other thought crosses your mind.

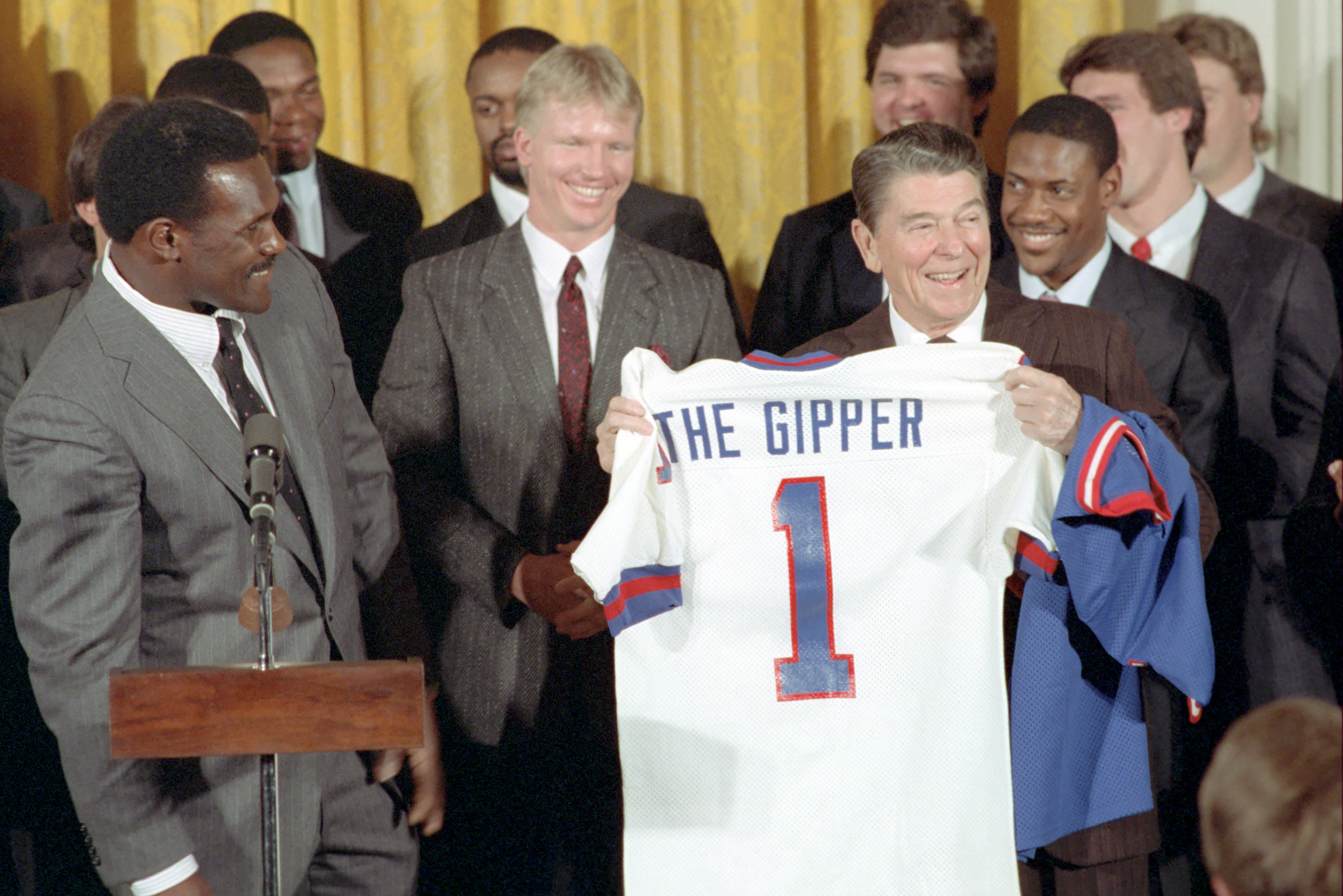
Simms at the White House following the Giants Super Bowl XXI victory.

On January 25, 1987, the Giants faced the Denver Broncos in Super Bowl XXI. In the biggest game of his life, Simms had one of the finest performances in Super Bowl history. He completed 22 of 25 passes for 268 yards, setting Super Bowl records for consecutive completions (10), accuracy (88%), and passer rating (150.9). In addition, he threw 3 touchdown passes and his passer rating set an NFL postseason record. "This might be the best game a quarterback has ever played", Giants coach Bill Parcells later said. Two of the most famous plays from the game were the flea flicker to McConkey, and the touchdown pass caught by McConkey off of the fingertips of Giants tight end, Mark Bavaro. The Giants defeated the Broncos 39–20, and Simms was named MVP of Super Bowl XXI. He is credited for being the first to use the phrase "I'm going to Disney World!" following a championship victory.

=== Later career: 1987–1993 ===
Simms performed well in the strike-shortened 1987 NFL season, finishing with the second highest quarterback rating in the NFC. He threw for 2,230 yards, 17 touchdowns, and 9 interceptions. He passed for 3,359 yards, 21 touchdowns, and 11 interceptions while completing 54.9% of his passes in the 1988 season. The Giants rebounded from a 6–9 record in 1987 to finish 10–6 but fell just short of the playoffs due to the NFL tie-breaker system. In 1989, the Giants started 8–1 and finished 12–4, Simms passed for 3,061 yards, 14 touchdowns, and 14 interceptions on 56.3% completion percentage. He performed consistently most of the season except for a two-game stretch against the Eagles and 49ers where he produced seven turnovers, six of which resulted in points for the opposition. He also struggled in the Giants' playoff game against the Los Angeles Rams, and the Giants lost 19–13. In 1990, Simms was having one of his finest seasons, leading the NFC with the highest quarterback rating (92.7) and the Giants to an 11–3 record, but his season was cut short due to a broken foot suffered in the Week 15 game against the Giants' eventual Super Bowl XXV opponent, the Buffalo Bills. The Giants defeated the Bills 20–19 in the Super Bowl with Jeff Hostetler filling in at quarterback.

After the Giants' Super Bowl victory, Parcells resigned and was replaced by the team's running backs coach, Ray Handley. One of Handley's first decisions was to select Hostetler as the team's starting quarterback following his performance in Super Bowl XXV. Simms saw only spot action in two games prior to Week 13, when Hostetler broke his back in a game against the Tampa Bay Buccaneers. Simms finished the game and reclaimed the starting job, but won only once in his remaining four starts as the Giants failed to return to the playoffs at 8–8.

Simms was named the starter for the 1992 season after beating out Hostetler for the job in preseason. Simms suffered a severe arm injury in a Week 4 loss to the Los Angeles Raiders and missed the remainder of the season. Between the 1991 and 1992 seasons, he amassed a combined 1,905 yards, 13 touchdowns, and 7 interceptions while completing 59.3% of his passes. The Giants finished the 1992 season at 6–10, which led to Handley's firing and the hiring of former Denver Broncos coach Dan Reeves. As part of an overall house cleaning, Reeves released Hostetler and named Simms his starting quarterback. Simms started all 16 games in 1993, being one of only seven quarterbacks to do so, and led the Giants to a resurgent 11–5 season including a victory over the Minnesota Vikings in the playoffs. He underwent shoulder surgery after the 1993 NFL season to repair a torn labrum. The surgery was successful, and team doctor Russell F. Warren's prognosis for recovery was excellent, and Simms was expected to be ready in time for training camp. However, later during that offseason, Simms was released by the Giants, and subsequently decided to retire. Upon his release, co-owner Wellington Mara called it "a day of overwhelming sadness." In an interview in the 2024 documentary "The Duke: The Giant Life of Wellington Mara", Simms recalled that Mara didn't agree with the decision to let him go and was willing to make changes to the front office to ensure Simms stayed, but Simms declined saying it would just make it worse.

Simms considered playing for the Cardinals in 1994 and the Browns in 1995, but eventually decided to stay retired.

In his 14 seasons with the Giants, Simms completed 2,576 out of 4,647 passes for 33,462 yards and 199 touchdowns. His career passing yardage total ranked him at 11th in NFL history at the time of his retirement. He added 349 carries for 1,252 rushing yards and 6 touchdowns on the ground. He set team records for most passes completed and attempted in one game (40 and 62, respectively), season (286, 533), and career (2,576, 4,647), most career touchdown passes (199) and most 300-yard games in a career (21). Simms still owns some of the New York Giants passing records, although Eli Manning has surpassed most of them: season passes (387 completed, 618 attempted), career completed passes (4,895), career touchdowns (366), career 300-yard games (53). Sports Illustrated considered Simms to be the "Most Underrated Quarterback" in NFL history in their August 27, 2001, issue entitled, "The Most Overrated and Underrated".

== NFL career statistics ==
Legend
	Super Bowl MVP
	Won the Super Bowl
**Bold**	Career high

=== Regular season ===
Year	Team	Games			Passing							
Year	Team	GP	GS	Record	Cmp	Att	Pct	Yds	Avg	TD	Int	Rtg
1979	NYG	12	11	6–5	134	265	50.6	1,743	6.6	13	14	66.0
1980	NYG	13	13	3–10	193	402	48.0	2,321	5.8	15	19	58.9
1981	NYG	10	10	5–5	172	316	54.4	2,031	6.4	11	9	74.0
1983	NYG	2	0	—	7	13	53.8	130	**10.0**	0	1	56.6
1984	NYG	16	16	9–7	**286**	**533**	53.7	**4,044**	7.6	**22**	18	78.1
1985	NYG	16	16	10–6	275	495	55.6	3,829	7.7	**22**	20	78.6
1986	NYG	16	16	**14–2**	259	468	55.3	3,487	7.5	21	**22**	74.6
1987	NYG	9	9	4–5	163	282	57.8	2,230	7.9	17	9	90.0
1988	NYG	15	15	9–6	253	479	54.9	3,359	7.0	21	11	82.1
1989	NYG	15	15	11–4	228	405	56.3	3,061	7.6	14	14	77.6
1990	NYG	14	14	11–3	184	311	59.2	2,284	7.3	15	4	**92.7**
1991	NYG	6	4	1–3	82	141	58.3	993	7.0	8	4	87.0
1992	NYG	4	4	1–3	83	137	60.6	812	6.7	5	3	83.3
1993	NYG	16	16	11–5	247	400	**61.8**	3,038	7.6	15	9	88.3
Total		164	159	95–64	2,576	4,647	55.4	33,462	7.2	199	157	78.5

=== Postseason ===
Year	Team	Games			Passing							
Year	Team	GP	GS	Record	Cmp	Att	Pct	Yds	Avg	TD	Int	Rtg
1984	NYG	2	2	1–1	**47**	**75**	62.7	397	5.3	0	**2**	65.2
1985	NYG	2	2	1–1	29	66	**67.1**	390	5.9	2	1	67.1
1986	NYG	3	3	**3–0**	38	58	65.5	**494**	**8.5**	**8**	0	**131.8**
1989	NYG	1	1	0–1	14	29	48.3	180	6.2	0	1	53.8
1990	NYG	0	0	Did not play due to injury								
1993	NYG	2	2	1–1	29	51	56.9	218	4.3	0	**2**	50.9
Total		10	10	6–4	157	279	56.3	1,679	6.0	10	6	77.0

== Career highlights ==
=== Awards and honors ===
- 2× Super Bowl champion (XXI, XXV)
- Super Bowl MVP (XXI)
- NFL Man of the Year (1993)
- 2× Pro Bowl (1985, 1993)
- Pro Bowl MVP (1985)
- Jim Thorpe Trophy (1986)
- NEA First-team All-Pro (1986)
- PFWA All-Rookie Team (1979)
- New York Giants Ring of Honor
- New York Giants No. 11 retired
- 11th greatest New York Giant of all-time

=== Records ===
NFL records

- Highest completion percentage in a Super Bowl (minimum 14 pass attempts): 88%, Super Bowl XXI
- Highest passer rating in a Super Bowl (minimum 14 pass attempts): 150.9, Super Bowl XXI

Giants franchise records

As of the 2017 NFL off-season, Simms still held at least 13 Giants franchise records, including:

- Most Passing Yards (game): 513 (1985-10-13 @CIN)
- Most Passing Yards (game, as a rookie): 300 (1979-10-14 SFO)
- Most Intercepted (rookie season): 14 (1979; tied with Joe Pisarcik)
- Best Passer Rating (playoff season): 131.8 (1986)
- Best Passer Rating (playoff game): 150.9 (1987-01-25 DEN)
- Most Sacked (career): 477
- Most Sacked (season): 55 (1984)
- Most Sacked (game): 9 (1981-11-01 NYJ)
- Most Sacked (playoff game): 6 (1984-12-29 @SFO and 1986-01-05 @CHI; tied with Eli Manning)
- Most Sacked (rookie season): 39 (1979)
- Most Yds/Pass Att (game): 13.63 (1984-09-02 PHI)
- Most Yds/Pass Att (playoff game): 10.72 (1987-01-25 DEN)
- Most 300+ yard passing games (rookie season): 1

== Post NFL career ==
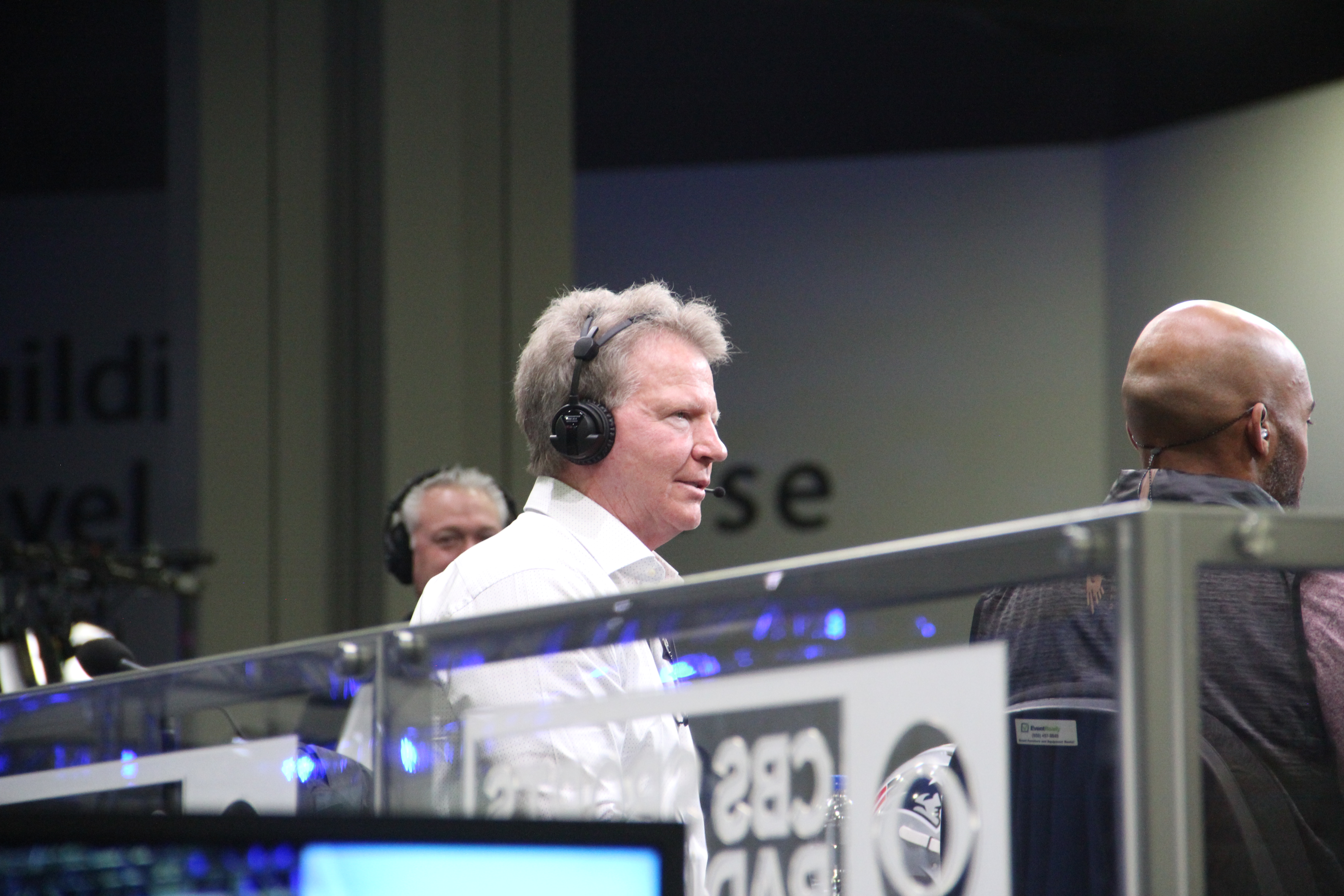
Simms (center) during a CBS broadcast in 2019

On September 4, 1995, Simms' jersey was retired in a halftime ceremony of a game versus the Dallas Cowboys. During an emotional speech, Simms stated that he wanted to don his jersey one final time, and throw "one more pass" to teammate Lawrence Taylor. Simms later commented, "[a]ll of a sudden it kind of hit me, I've put Lawrence in a really tough spot; national TV, he's got dress shoes and a sports jacket on, and he's had a few beers and he's going to run down the field and I'm going to throw him a pass." Simms then motioned for Taylor to run a longer pattern, and after 30–40 yards, threw him the pass. Taylor later stated that the situation made him more nervous than any play of his career, "I'm saying to myself (as the pass is being thrown), 'If I drop this pass, I got to run my black ass all the way to Upper Saddle River because there ain't no way I'm going to be able to stay in that stadium'." Taylor caught the pass however, and the capacity crowd in attendance cheered in approval.

After his retirement as a player in 1994, Simms first joined ESPN then went on to join NBC's lead broadcast crew, teaming with Dick Enberg and Paul Maguire on NBC's coverage of Super Bowl XXX and Super Bowl XXXII. Simms also announced weightlifting at the 1996 Summer Olympics and served as a sideline reporter on the NBA on NBC for NBC Sports. In 1998, he moved to CBS with the AFC package, teaming first with Greg Gumbel (through the end of the 2003 season) and later with Jim Nantz on the CBS's lead broadcast team. He also worked with Armen Keteyian, Bonnie Bernstein, Lesley Visser, and Tracy Wolfson. Since 2009, he has been a host of Inside the NFL on Showtime (another CBS holding) with James Brown and Cris Collinsworth. In 2017, he was replaced by Tony Romo as a color commentator and joined the CBS pregame show The NFL Today. He left CBS after his contract expired at the end of the 2023 season. Simms has also worked on Westwood One as an analyst for select games in 2024. Simms returned to NBC Sports as a college football analyst in 2025.

Sims was the host of The 1995/1996 NFL Interactive Yearbook CD-ROM.

Simms joined WFAN's Boomer and Gio as a weekly guest in 2024.

Simms was part of the commentary team along with Nantz in the Madden NFL 13, 25, 15, and 16 video games.

Outside of football broadcasting, Simms co-hosted the Miss Universe 2002 pageant with actress and model Daisy Fuentes. He made an appearance as himself on the CBS soap opera As the World Turns in 2007, and in February 2010 made an appearance on The Price Is Right (with Nantz) to present a Super Bowl XLIV showcase. In the same month, he appeared as himself (again with Nantz) on the How I Met Your Mother episode "Rabbit or Duck". On November 13, 2014, Simms appeared uncredited on the episode "Just a Regular Irregular" of the CBS television series Elementary. Simms' cameo was as a consultant to Sherlock Holmes in the art of knife throwing. Furthermore, Simms was forced to settle a debt with Holmes by loaning him a Super Bowl ring for the purpose of advancing the investigation.

== Personal life ==
Simms and his wife, Diana, live in Franklin Lakes, New Jersey. They have three children: Chris, Deirdre, and Matt. His son-in-law is former NFL linebacker Brian Toal, who was schoolmates with Matt. Simms is fond of New Jersey, remarking in 1987: "I wasn't overjoyed about coming to New York. When I thought of New York, I thought of New York City. But out here, it's just like anywhere else."

In 2011, Simms was inducted into the Kentucky Pro Football Hall of Fame.

== See also ==
- History of the New York Giants (1979–1993)
- List of 500-yard passing games in the National Football League

Preceded by Bob Trumpy	NFL on NBC lead analyst (with Paul Maguire); 1995–1997	Succeeded by John Madden (in 2006)
Preceded by John Madden (in 1993)	NFL on CBS lead analyst 1998–2016	Succeeded by Tony Romo
Preceded by Bob Trumpy	Super Bowl television color commentator (AFC package carrier); 1995-2016 (with Paul Maguire from 1995-1997)	Succeeded by Tony Romo
