= Richard Houston Dudley =

American politician (1836–1914)

Richard H. Dudley
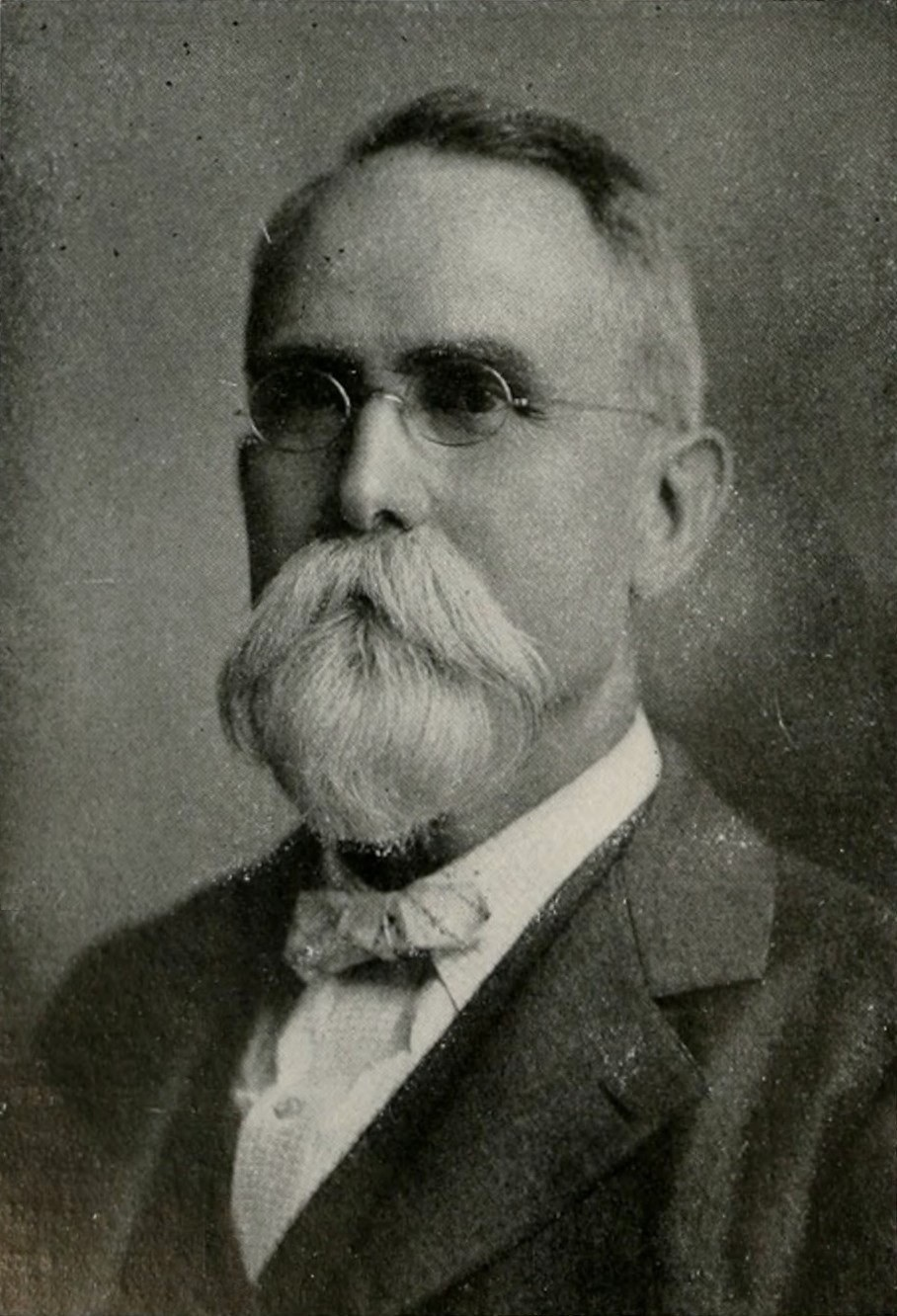
- Born: July 29, 1836; Bedford County, Tennessee
- Died: August 30, 1914 (aged 78); Nashville, Tennessee

Richard Houston Dudley (July 29, 1836 – August 30, 1914) was an American Democratic politician, Confederate soldier and businessman. He served as the Mayor of Nashville, Tennessee from 1897 to 1900.

== Early life ==
Dudley was born near Shelbyville in Bedford County, Tennessee on July 29, 1836. After attending the local schools, he moved to Smyrna, Tennessee, where he found work in the general merchandise trade.

== Career ==
Dudley served in the Confederate States Army during the American Civil War of 1861–1865. In May 1861, he enlisted in Company I, Maney's 1st Tennessee Infantry. During the summer of 1864, Dudley became captain of Company K in the newly formed 21st Tennessee Cavalry. He was later promoted to major in that regiment. After the war, he returned to Smyrna.

In 1873, Dudley moved to Nashville where he was a member of the wholesale grocery firm of Ordlay, Dudley and McGuire, and the hardware firm of Dudley Brothers & Lipscomb. He served as Mayor of Nashville from 1897 to 1900. He was supported by Democrats and Irish Americans who lived in Nashville during his campaign.

== Personal life ==
Dudley was married to Mattie Rose in September, 1865. She died soon after and he remarried to Mary E. Beasley on April 4, 1868, who died in 1907. He had no children.

Dudley died in Nashville on August 30, 1914. He is buried at Mount Olivet Cemetery.

Political offices
| Preceded by William Marshall McCarthy | Mayor of Nashville, Tennessee; 1897–1900 | Succeeded by James Marshall Head |
