= LSU Tigers football =

College football team representing Louisiana State University

2026 LSU Tigers football team
- First season: 1893; 133 years ago
- Athletic director: Verge Ausberry
- Head coach: Lane Kiffin; 1st season, 6–5 (.545)
- Location: Baton Rouge, Louisiana
- Stadium: Tiger Stadium (capacity: 102,321)
- NCAA division: Division I FBS
- Conference: SEC
- Colors: Purple and gold
- All-time record: 827–442–47 (.646)
- CFP record: 2–0 (1.000)
- Bowl record: 30–24–1 (.555)

National championships
- Claimed: 1908, 1958, 2003, 2007, 2011, 2019
- Unclaimed: 1936, 1962, 2011

National finalist
- BCS: 2003, 2007, 2011
- CFP: 2019

College Football Playoff appearances
- 2019

Conference championships
- SIAA: 1896, 1902, 1908 SoCon: 1932 SEC: 1935, 1936, 1958, 1961, 1970, 1986, 1988, 2001, 2003, 2007, 2011, 2019

Division championships
- SEC West: 1996, 1997, 2001, 2002, 2003, 2005, 2007, 2011, 2019, 2022
- Heisman winners: Billy Cannon – 1959; Joe Burrow – 2019; Jayden Daniels – 2023
- Consensus All-Americans: 41
- Rivalries: Arkansas (rivalry); Ole Miss (rivalry); Texas A&M (rivalry); Alabama (rivalry); Mississippi State (rivalry); Auburn (rivalry); Florida (rivalry); Tulane (rivalry); Clemson (rivalry)

Uniforms
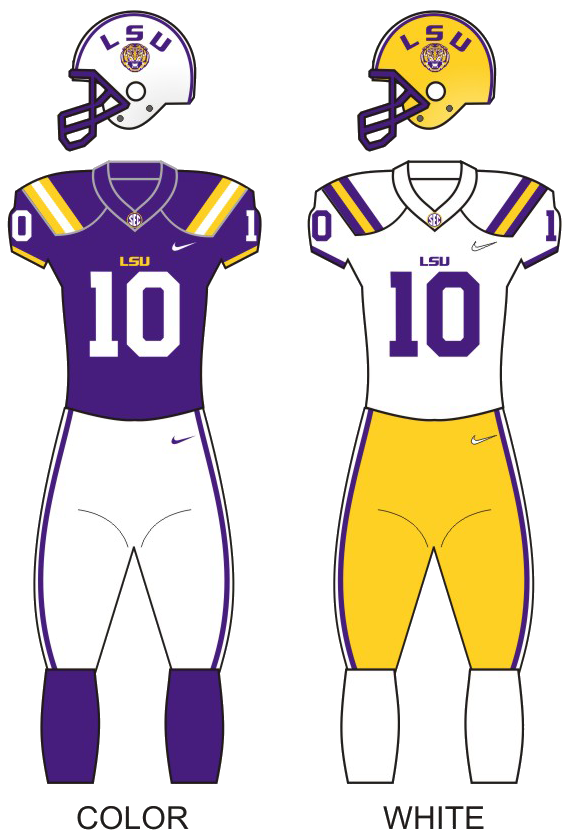
- Fight song: Fight for LSU
- Mascot: Mike the Tiger
- Marching band: Louisiana State University Tiger Marching Band
- Outfitter: Nike
- Website: LSUsports.net

The LSU Tigers football program, also known as the Fighting Tigers, represents Louisiana State University in college football. The Tigers compete in the Football Bowl Subdivision (FBS) of the National Collegiate Athletic Association (NCAA) and the Southeastern Conference (SEC).

LSU ranks 16th best in winning percentage in NCAA Division I FBS history and claims four national championships (1958, 2003, 2007, and 2019), 16 conference championships, and over 40 consensus All-Americans. Three players for the Tigers have won the Heisman Trophy: Billy Cannon (1959), Joe Burrow (2019), and Jayden Daniels (2023).

The team plays on the university's campus at Tiger Stadium in Baton Rouge, Louisiana. The program's current head coach is Lane Kiffin.

== History ==
=== Early history (1893–1954) ===
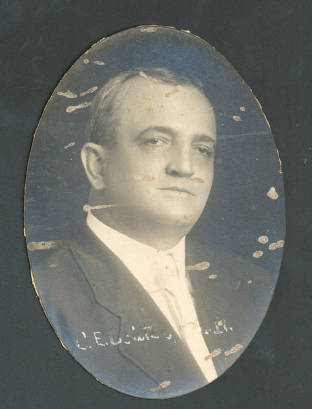
Charles Coates, LSU's first coach

Dr. Charles E. Coates, a chemistry professor at the university known for his work on sugar, and former football player at Johns Hopkins, assembled a group of students to create the school's first team. Coates' plan for a football team dates back to the autumn of the previous year, when he assembled a team and held one or two scrimmages before shelving the idea for the following autumn. The team wore makeshift uniforms with purple and gold ribbons for its first game, a 34–0 loss to Tulane and the only game played by LSU that year. The game was played in front of a crowd of 1,500 at Crescent City Base Ball Park in New Orleans. The game sparked a rivalry between the schools that lasted well into the 20th century. Future Louisiana governor Ruffin G. Pleasant was the quarterback and captain of the LSU team. According to legend, purple and gold were chosen because they were Mardi Gras colors, and the green was sold out. (Note: An LSU baseball team had also worn purple and gold in its first varsity game against Tulane earlier in 1893, even though LSU's official colors at the time were actually blue and white.) The game was the only one Coates ever coached, and the only football game Pleasant played in. Pleasant was later inducted into the LSU Athletic Hall of Fame.

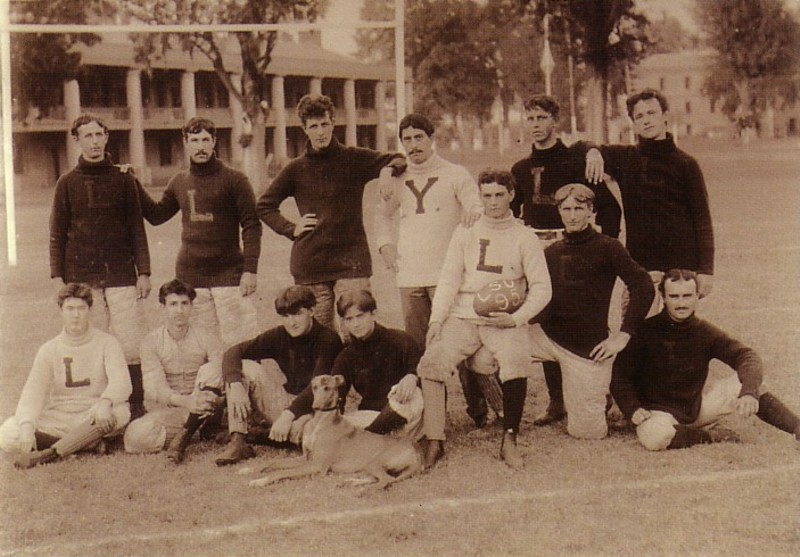
1895 football team

LSU achieved its first victory by beating Natchez Athletic Club 26–0 in 1894. Samuel Marmaduke Dinwidie Clark has the honor of scoring the very first touchdown in LSU history. The first football game played on the LSU campus was at State Field on December 3, 1894, a loss against Mississippi. LSU's only touchdown in that game was scored by the head coach, Albert Simmonds. This was the first year of play for William S. Slaughter who lettered as an end for 5 years (1894, 1895, 1896, 1897, 1898). Slaughter was LSU's first five time football letterman. By 1895, LSU had its first win in Baton Rouge. In 1896 LSU hired Allen Jeardeau of Platteville, Wisconsin. LSU went undefeated, winning the school's first conference championship in the school's first year as a member of the Southern Intercollegiate Athletic Association (SIAA), the first southern athletics. conference. Tulane was forced to forfeit for its attempt to play Hall of Fame Penn back George H. Brooke. This was the first team to be called the "Tigers." The mascot was reputed to be named after the "Fighting Tigers," the name of the 9th Louisiana Infantry in the Civil War. Coach Jeardeau returned for his second but final year at LSU in 1897 for two games in Baton Rouge. A yellow fever outbreak throughout the South caused the postponement of LSU's classes starting, and the football season being cut back to only two games.

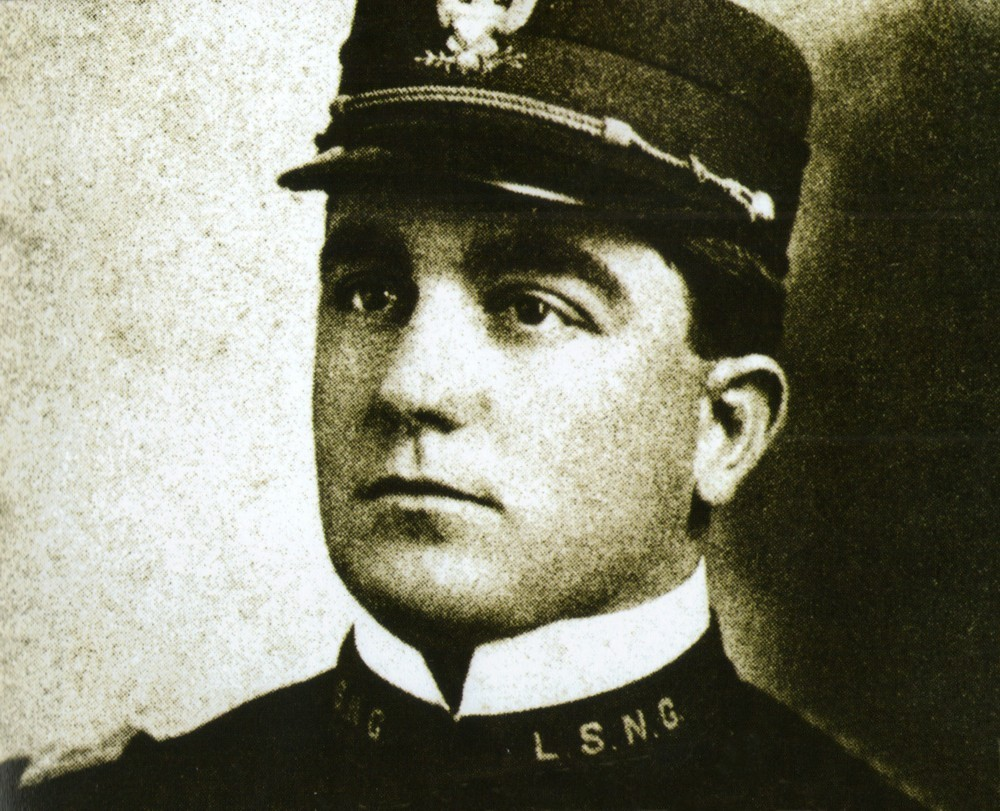
Chavanne as LSU cadet

Another outbreak of yellow fever similar to the one in 1897 caused LSU to play only one game in 1898. By the time LSU was able to play its only game of the season, Allen Jeardeau had departed from the school as head football coach, and no provision had been made to replace him. The job of coach then fell to the team's captain, Edmond Chavanne, thus the first LSU alumnus to coach the team. New coach John P. Gregg led the Tigers to a 1–4 season in 1899, including a loss to the "iron men" of Sewanee. The only wins were in an exhibition game against a high school team (which LSU does not officially record as a win) and against rival, Tulane. It was the first year of play for LSU's second five-year letterman, John J. Coleman (1899, 1900, 1901, 1902, 1903).

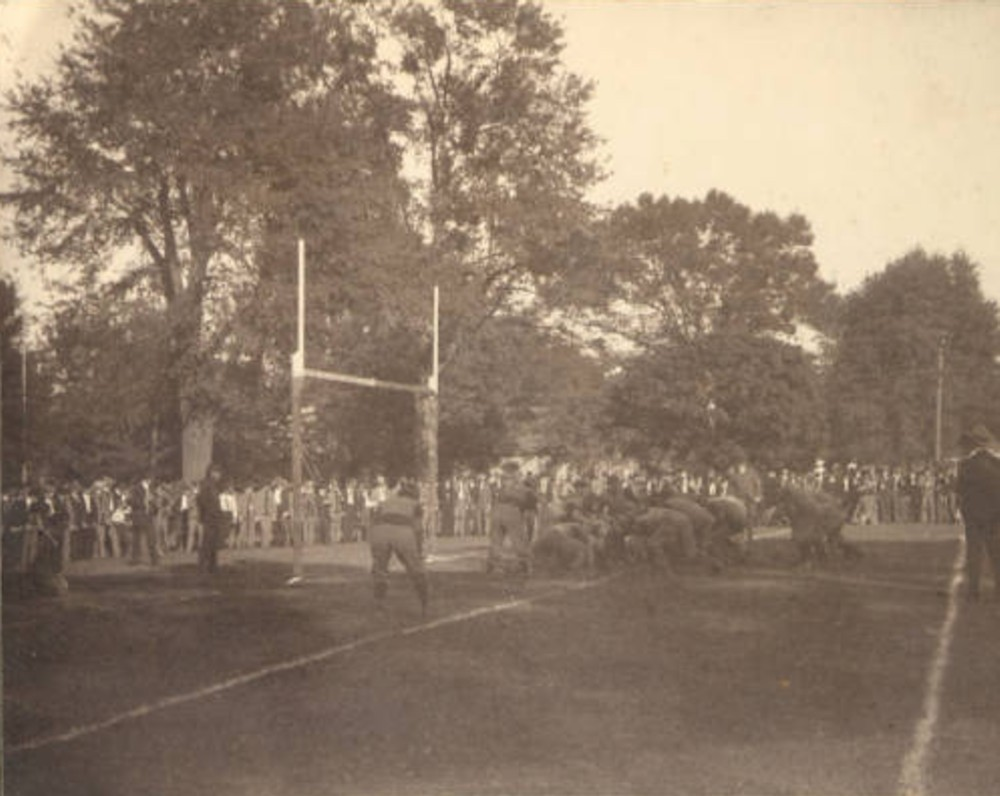
Auburn vs. LSU on State Field, 1902

Chavanne was rehired in 1900, posting a 2–2 record. Chavanne was replaced by W. S. Borland as head coach in 1901, leading the team to a successful 5–1 season. After the Tulane game, a 22–0 loss, LSU protested to the SIAA, and alleged that Tulane had used a professional player during the game. Several months later, the SIAA ruled the game an 11–0 forfeit in favor of LSU. The seven-game 1902 season was the longest yet for the Tigers and also featured the most games on the road. LSU upset Texas, avenged last season's loss to Auburn, and lost only to Vanderbilt, which claimed an SIAA title after the win. The 1903 season broke the previous season's record for most games played (seven) with nine games. Dan A. Killian coached the Tigers from 1904 to 1906. Back René A. Messa made some All-Southern teams in 1904. The 1905 team went 3–0.

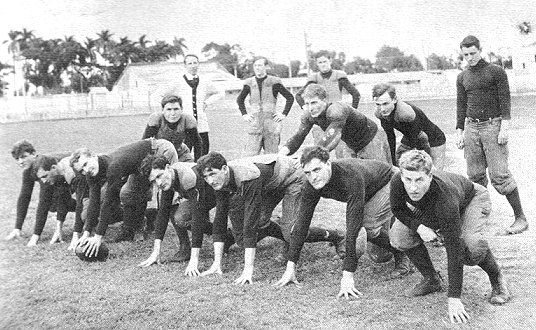
1907 LSU Tigers Football Team in Havana, Cuba for the 1907 Bacardi Bowl

In 1907, LSU became the first American college football team to play on foreign soil in the Bacardi Bowl against the University of Havana on Christmas Day in Havana, Cuba. LSU won 56–0. John Seip ran back a 67-yard punt return.

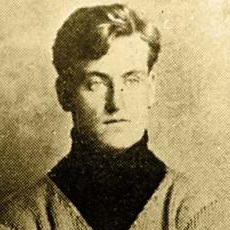
Doc Fenton

The 1908 team posted an undefeated 10–0 record. Quarterback Doc Fenton led the nation in scoring with 132 points, posting then school records of 36 extra points and six field goals. Mike Lally was his running mate in the backfield. LSU beat Auburn 10–2, Seip going over for the first touchdown. Auburn's two points came on a safety, after T. C. Locke blocked Fenton's punt. Fenton could not recover the fumble because he was knocked unconscious by a spectator's cane. The National Championship Foundation retroactively awarded 1908 LSU the national championship though it is not claimed by LSU. This season also led to an SIAA championship; but was clouded by accusations of professionalism from Grantland Rice and rival school Tulane. Auburn and Vanderbilt were among those listed as alternative conference champions. Both Fenton and Seip were inaugural inductees into the LSU Athletic Hall of Fame. 1910 was a disastrous year for the Tigers. After a strong 1909 campaign under coaches Joe Pritchard and John W. Mayhew, which saw their only conference loss come to SIAA champion Sewanee, the team lost some star power; Stovall, Lally, and Seip had all graduated.

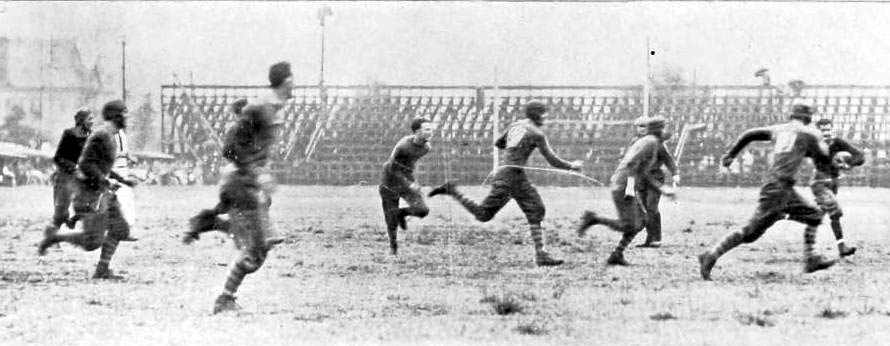
1914 LSU-Tulane

Pat Dwyer, an assistant at Auburn in 1908, was hired in 1911. He once used guard Tom Dutton for a "kangaroo play" in which back Lawrence Dupont would crawl between Dutton's legs; supposedly very effective in short yardage situations. The 1913 team lost only to SIAA champion Auburn by a touchdown. Fullback Alf Reid made All-Southern. LSU's largest loss margin came on October 31, 1914 in a game against Texas A&M in Dallas, Texas. The final score was Texas A&M 63, LSU 9. In 1916, Walter Camp gave Phillip Cooper honorable mention on his All-America team. Irving Pray and Dana X. Bible also served as the Tigers coach in 1916 Washington's Wayne Sutton coached the 1917 team to a 3–5 record.

LSU–Tulane, 1922

Irving Pray coached full seasons in 1919 and 1922, the inaugural season of the Southern Conference (SoCon). Branch Bocock led the Tigers for the 1921 season, in which they were beaten only by Tulane. Mike Donahue came from Auburn to be the seventeenth head football coach at LSU in 1923. The biggest win in Donahue's tenure was probably the 20–14 victory over Indiana in 1924. The final game of the 1924 season saw the first game played at Tiger Stadium, with an original seating capacity of 12,000, on Thanksgiving Day against Tulane. 18,000 fans managed to fit into the stadium to watch the Green Wave defeat the Tigers 13–0. In 1925, the team's first full season in Tiger Stadium began with shutout wins over Louisiana Normal and Southwestern Louisiana. The following week coach Wallace Wade's national champion Alabama blew-out LSU in Tiger Stadium, 42–0, which was at the time the worst home loss in school history. The 1925 team also beat John Heisman's Rice team, but ended the season with a second straight shutout loss to Tulane. Donahue resigned after the 1927 season, less than two months after signing a six-year contract extension with the team. LSU compiled a record of 23 wins, 19 losses, and three ties while with Donahue, which included a 5–14–2 record in SoCon games.

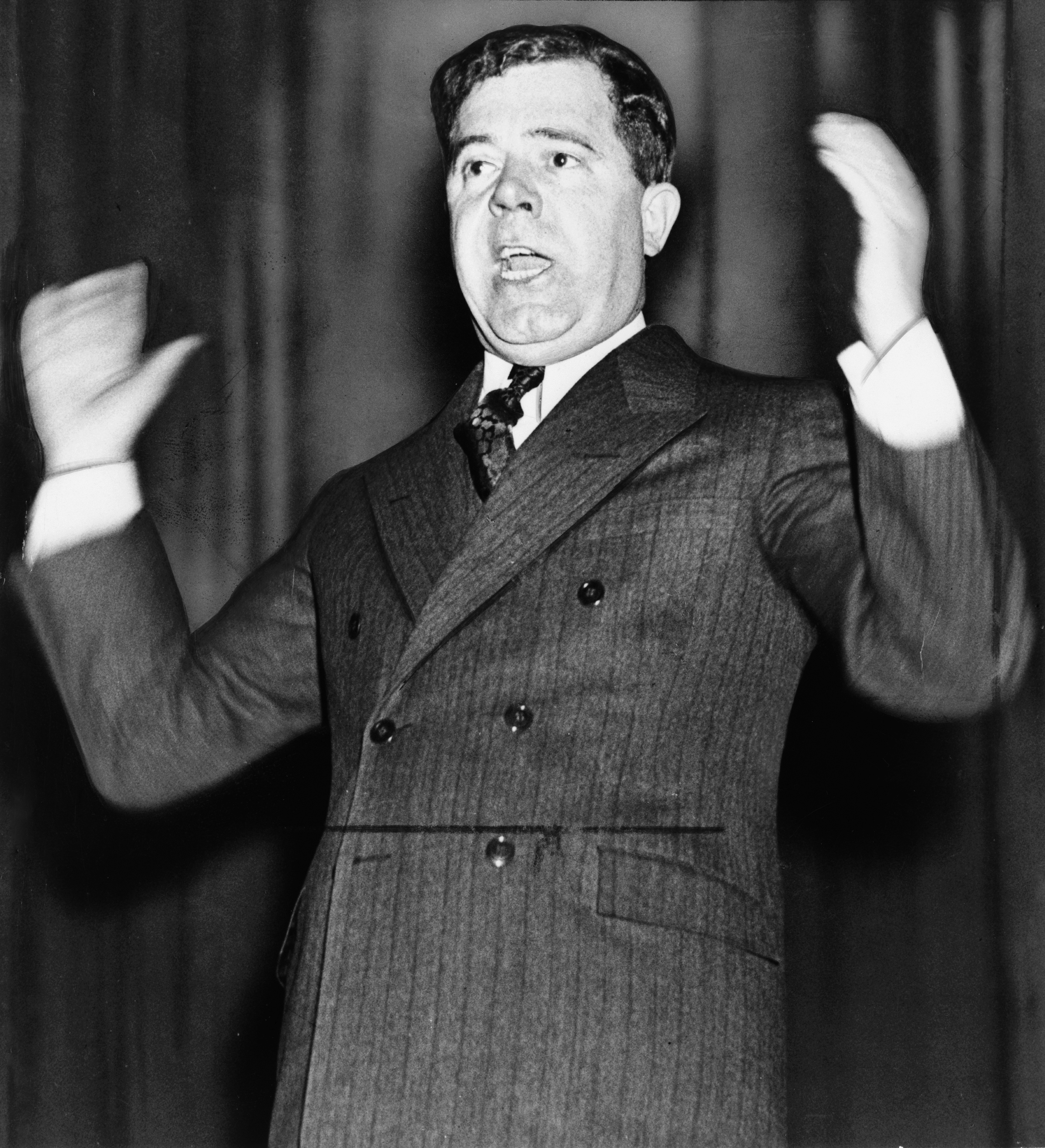
Louisiana governor and U.S. senator Huey Long was instrumental in building the program.

Vanderbilt coach Dan McGugin recommended Russ Cohen for the LSU job. Cohen's best year at LSU was his first, in 1928. Led by All-Southern captain Jess Tinsley, Tigers posted a 6–2–1 record, suffering losses to Arkansas and Wallace Wade's Alabama Crimson Tide. Star halfback Percy Brown broke his shoulder against Alabama. The tie was to Bill Banker and rival Tulane, which was as good as its ever been from 1929 to 1931. In 1931 LSU played its first night game in Tiger Stadium, a 31–0 victory over Spring Hill. Under West Point's Biff Jones, the 1932 team tied for the Southern Conference championship in its last season as a member of the conference. The 1933 lost no games and was led by track and field athlete Jack Torrance. Jones resigned after the 1934 season after a heated exchange with noted LSU supporter, Louisiana senator Huey P. Long. In the last game of the season, Long was displeased after the team had lost two straight games and were trailing at halftime to Oregon. Long decided to give a motivational speech to the team at halftime, but was turned away by Jones at the locker room door. The ensuing argument ended with Jones declaring to resign, effective at the end of the game. Gaynell Tinsley, the cousin of Jess, has a profile at the College Football Hall of Fame which describes him this way: "Tinsley was a magnificent athletic specimen, standing 6-0, and weighing 196-pounds, size he used equally well as a defensive stalwart who was a blocking master." As a sophomore in 1934, Tinsley had a 65-yard pass reception, thrown by halfback Abe Mickal, against Southern Methodist University, which stood as a record for several years as "the longest pass in Southern football history."

Gaynell Tinsley

Under head coach Bernie Moore, LSU won their first Southeastern Conference (SEC) Championship finishing with a 5–0 conference record and 9–2–0 overall in 1935. LSU played in their first Sugar Bowl game, falling to No. 4 TCU 3–2 at Tulane Stadium. The Tigers and Horned Frogs both took home the Williamson Poll national championship, which is not claimed by LSU. End Gaynell Tinsley was named a consensus All-American in 1935 and 1936, becoming the first All-America selection for LSU. Coach Moore once said, "Tinsley could have made All-American at any position. He was so tough, he made blockers quit. He's the greatest lineman I ever saw." Along with Tinsley in the line were Marvin Stewart, Justin Rukas, and Jeff Barrett. In the backfield were Mickal, Jesse Fatherree, and Pinky Rohm – all members of LSU's "Early Days" team of the century. The team's quarterback was Bill May, awarded the Jacobs Blocking Trophy in 1936. The 1936 team won the school's second SEC Championship finishing with a 6–0 conference record and 9–1–1 overall. The Tigers finished runner-up to Minnesota in the AP Poll. LSU won the Williamson Poll and Sagarin Ratings national championships, which are not claimed by the school. LSU's largest margin of victory, and most points scored in a football game came on November 21, in a game at Tiger Stadium against USL (University of Southwestern Louisiana, now University of Louisiana Lafayette). The final score was LSU 93, USL 0. The 1937 team featured Ken Kavanaugh and was upset by Vanderbilt using a hidden ball trick, the school's first-ever victory over a ranked opponent. This season also featured the first game in the Florida–LSU football rivalry, which was won 19–0 by LSU. In 1939, in a game against Holy Cross, Kavanaugh caught four touchdown passes in the 26–7 win. According to Kavanaugh and teammate Young Bussey, Kavanaugh found four rusty nails on the sideline during the game. The next week against Rice, he found another nail and scored another touchdown to give LSU a 7–0 win. The pattern continued against Loyola and Vanderbilt, as Kavanaugh found two nails before each game and in each scored two touchdowns. A sportswriter for the Baton Rouge Advocate claimed he saw coach Moore at a local store stocking up on nails before LSU's game against No. 1 Tennessee. Kavanaugh failed to score in the game, however, and the Tigers lost 20–0. The Nashville Banner named Kavanaugh co-MVP of the Southeastern Conference along with Bob Foxx of Tennessee. Kavanaugh was a consensus All-America selection for the 1939 All-America Team. The 1943 team was led by Steve Van Buren, moved to running back because of a lack of players due to World War II conscription, and won the Orange Bowl. Van Buren led the NCAA in scoring that season, with 98 points (110 including the bowl game). The 1946 team played in one of the most notable instances of the Cotton Bowl Classic – "Ice Bowl." LSU, led by head coach Moore and quarterback Y. A. Tittle, entered the game against Arkansas with a 9–1 record. Ice, sleet and snow pelted the stadium as LSU players filled oil drums with charcoal and started fires for makeshift heaters while fans built fires in the stands. LSU dominated the game with a 271–54 advantage in total yards and 15–1 advantage in first downs, but that did not equate to the numbers on the scoreboard; the game ended in a 0–0 tie and LSU finished the season 9–1–1.

In 1948, Moore retired, and Gaynell Tinsley, who had been working as an assistant, was promoted to replace his former mentor. The 1949 team made it to the Sugar Bowl, where it was swamped by Oklahoma. Tinsley became the first person to participate in the Sugar Bowl as both a player and a head coach. Tinsley's LSU teams never met with the same success they had achieved in 1949. In seven years as head coach at LSU, Tinsley's teams compiled a record of 35–34–6.

=== Paul Dietzel (1955–1961) ===
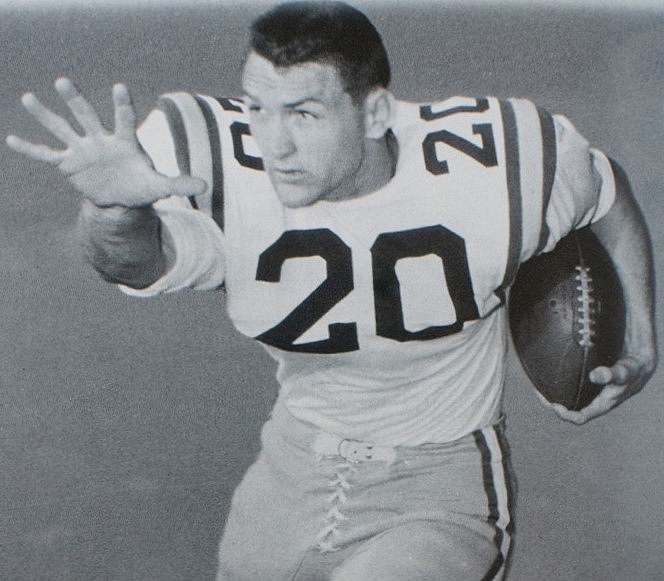
Billy Cannon

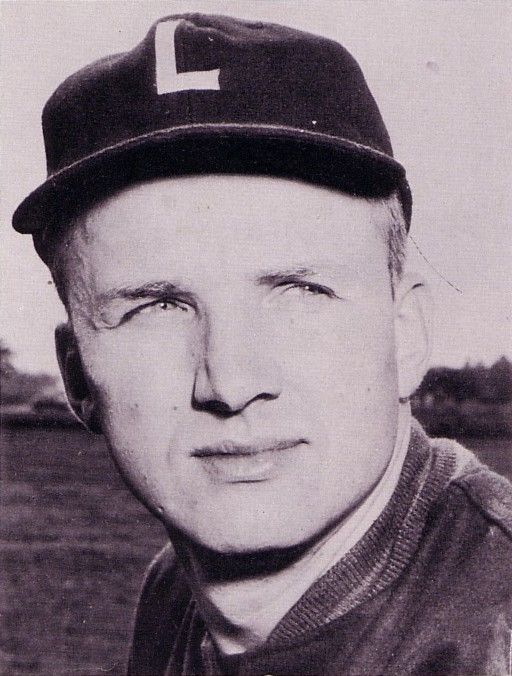
Paul Dietzel

In 1955, Paul Dietzel became the head coach at LSU. Jim Taylor was an All-American in 1957, and led the SEC in scoring in 1956 and 1957. During Dietzel's first three years, none of his teams had a winning season.

In 1958, however, Dietzel came up with a unique "three-platoon system." Instead of replacing individual players during the game, Dietzel would bring in an entirely new set of players between plays and series. The three teams were called the White Team (the first-string offense and defense), the Gold (Go) Team (the second-string offense), and the Chinese Bandits (the second-string defense). The system worked, as the 1958 team won the school's first claimed national championship, beating No. 12 Clemson 7–0 in the Sugar Bowl. The only score was a pass from Billy Cannon to sophomore Mickey Mangham, one of the smallest players on the team. Cannon won the Heisman Trophy in 1959. On Halloween, late in the game between No. 1 LSU and No. 3 Ole Miss, LSU was trailing 3–0. Cannon returned a punt 89 yards for a TD, breaking seven tackles. This has become known as Cannon's Halloween Run. The Rebels then drove down the field but were stopped on the LSU 1-yard line as the game ended resulting in a 7–3 victory for LSU in Tiger Stadium. In the Sugar Bowl, one of the most anticipated rematches in college football history took place. This game, however, would not be the classic that transpired only weeks before. Ole Miss dominated the game from start to finish and came away with a decisive 21–0 win over the Tigers. LSU finished the season having only given up 29 points.

=== Charles McClendon (1962–1979) ===
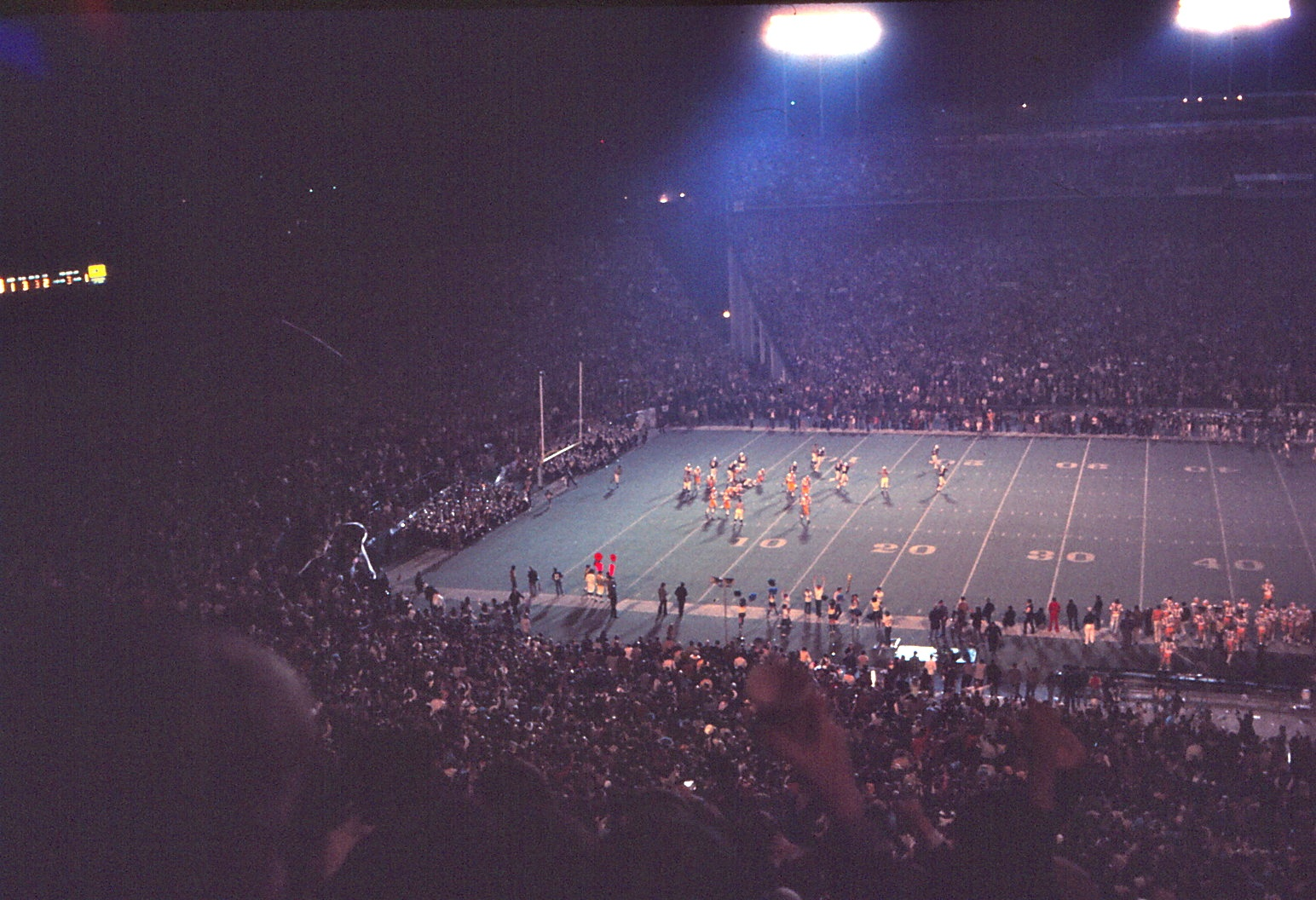
LSU vs. Tulane, 1973

Dietzel left for Army after the 1961 season, and Charles "Charlie" McClendon, an assistant since 1953, was named his successor. McClendon picked up where Dietzel left off, with three top ten finishes in his first four years. Doug Moreau broke Fenton's record of 6 field goals in 1965. In the 1966 Cotton Bowl, unranked LSU upset undefeated and No. 2 ranked Arkansas, winning the game 14–7 and snapping Arkansas' 22-game winning streak.

In 1972, number 6 LSU survived an upset bid from unranked Ole Miss in Tiger Stadium by winning the game on a touchdown pass from quarterback Bert Jones to running back Brad Davis. Ole Miss fans say the 1972 contest featured a few seconds of free football. The Tigers trailed the Rebels 16–10 with four seconds to play. After a lengthy incompletion by Jones, the game clock still showed one second remaining. The Tigers used the precious second to win the game on the last play, 17–16. A song was written to commemorate the game, called One Second Blues, which is featured on the album "Hey Fightin' Tigers". The alleged home-clock advantage inspired a sign at the Louisiana state line, leaving Mississippi, reading, "You are now entering Louisiana. Set your clocks back four seconds." For that year, the Ole Miss yearbook reported the score for the game as "Ole Miss 16, LSU 10 + 7 ".

==== Bo Rein tragedy ====
After having just four coaches over 44 years from 1935 to 1979, the team went through eight coaches in a 20-year period from 1980 to 1999. This stretch began with the death of Bo Rein in a plane crash before coaching a single game for the Tigers. Following the 1979 season, NC State head coach Bo Rein was hired to replace McClendon as LSU's head coach. In January 1980, Rein took a recruiting trip to Shreveport, Louisiana. On his January 10, 1980, return trip back to Baton Rouge, Louisiana, his private aircraft crashed, leaving no survivors.

Rein and experienced pilot Louis Benscotter left Shreveport in a Cessna 441 aircraft. The flight was planned to be a 40-minute trip, but when Benscotter rerouted east to avoid a storm, air traffic control lost contact with him. The aircraft climbed to 40,000 feet and kept heading due east. After being tracked on radar, the aircraft was eventually intercepted by U.S. Air National Guard Convair F-106 Delta Dart fighter aircraft over North Carolina, a thousand miles off-course and at an altitude of 41,600 ft (12,700 m), 6,600 ft (2,000 m) feet higher than its maximum certified ceiling. The military pilots could not see anyone in the cockpit and the aircraft continued on over the Atlantic Ocean, where it crashed after running out of fuel. A US Coast Guard crew spotted some debris, but no wreckage was ever recovered. The bodies of Rein and Benscotter have never been found.

The cause of the crash is undetermined but was most likely cabin depressurization causing hypoxia, a lack of oxygen, resulting in the occupants losing consciousness as in the 1999 South Dakota Learjet crash. Rein's two-month stint at LSU is the fourth shortest head coaching stint in FBS history, behind only George O'Leary's five-day tenure at Notre Dame in December 2001, Mike Haywood's sixteen-day stint at Pittsburgh in December 2010 and Manny Diaz's eighteen-day stint as Temple head coach in December 2018.

=== Jerry Stovall (1980–1983) ===
Jerry Stovall was hired to replace Rein as head coach in 1980. LSU defeated Alabama 20–10 in Birmingham, Alabama in Bear Bryant's last game coaching against LSU, in 1982. LSU's defense held Alabama to 119 yards of total offense, as the Tigers defeated the Tide for the first time since 1970. "You don't understand how it feels to get hit in the mouth for 11 years," Stovall said in the locker room after the game. "This is going to feel pretty good when it soaks in." 1983 was the first season calling LSU football for radio play-by-play man Jim Hawthorne, who served in this role until the 2016 season and became known as the "Voice of the Tigers". LSU finished that season with a record of 4–7, and Stovall was dismissed as LSU's head coach.

=== Bill Arnsparger (1984–1986) ===
Only two hours after the firing of Stovall, LSU hired Miami Dolphins defensive coordinator Bill Arnsparger as head coach. As the LSU head coach, Arnsparger led the Tigers to two Sugar Bowl berths in three seasons, in 1984 and 1986, both times against Nebraska. In 1984, LSU finished second behind Florida, but because of NCAA rules violations and a postseason ban on Florida, earned the Southeastern Conference (SEC) champion's automatic bid to the Sugar Bowl, with a panel of administrations subsequently voting to strip Florida of the conference championship as part of a reform that prohibits teams on NCAA postseason ban sanctions from earning conference championships. His 1986 LSU squad won the school's first outright SEC title since 1970 and the Tigers' last in the pre-championship game era, though the season was marred somewhat by an upset home loss to Miami University, his alma mater. By 1985, Arnsparger was growing frustrated with various scandals in the LSU athletic department, particularly involving basketball coach Dale Brown. After Sports Illustrated ran a cover story about the university's issues, Arnsparger met privately with athletic director Bob Brodhead to complain that the negative coverage was harming football recruiting and to threaten to leave the school if something wasn't done. Shortly after the final regular season game in 1986, Arnsparger announced he was resigning to become the athletic director at Florida.

=== Mike Archer (1987–1990) ===
Mike Archer came to LSU as an assistant coach in 1984 after being both a player and an assistant coach at Miami. He replaced Bill Arnsparger as the LSU Tigers football head coach in 1987 when Arnsparger left to become the athletic director at the University of Florida. Archer was Arnsparger's defensive coordinator in 1985 and 1986, and was Arnsparger's hand-picked successor. When Archer took the LSU head coaching job, he was 34 years old, the youngest head coach in Division I-A football. Archer was chosen over a number of interviewed candidates, which reportedly included Steve Spurrier, Mike Shanahan, and Mack Brown.

In 1987, LSU finished the season ranked No. 5 in both major polls with a 10–1–1 record, blemished only by a tie against Ohio State and a loss to Alabama. The latter was all that kept the Tigers out of the 1988 Sugar Bowl; Auburn went instead. It was LSU's first 10-win season in more than 25 years. In 1988, unranked LSU staged a near-literal, earth-shattering upset victory over No. 4 Auburn in Tiger Stadium, winning the game 7–6 with 1:41 remaining on a touchdown pass from quarterback Tommy Hodson to tailback Eddie Fuller. The reaction of the crowd was so immense that it registered as an earthquake on a seismograph in LSU's Howe-Russell Geoscience Complex. It was later dubbed "The Earthquake Game" by ESPN. After back-to-back losing seasons in 1989 and 1990, Archer was forced to resign. He lost four of his last five games in 1990, the lone win coming in the season finale against Tulane.

=== Curley Hallman (1991–1994) ===
Archer was replaced by Southern Miss head coach Curley Hallman. During Hallman's first season in 1991, several of Hallman's football players were accused of instigating a fight with LSU men's basketball players, including All-American Shaquille O'Neal, in Broussard Hall, LSU's athletic dormitory, two days prior to the Tigers' contest with Mississippi State. LSU started the 1991 season with one-sided losses to Georgia (31–10) and Hallman's alma mater, Texas A&M (45–7), and finished 5–6. The season marked the second time LSU suffered three consecutive losing seasons, and the first time since 1954 to 1956.

The 1992 season included being shut out 32–0 by Ole Miss on Halloween, and beaten 30–6 at Arkansas in the season finale, which was the first meeting between the Tigers and the Razorbacks upon Arkansas joining the SEC. The Tigers finished 2–9, still the worst in school history. In 1993, LSU's centennial football season, the Tigers lost 58–3 to the Florida Gators in Tiger Stadium, the worst loss in school history. Amazingly, just four weeks after that, the Tigers stunned the Alabama Crimson Tide, 17–13, at Bryant–Denny Stadium in Tuscaloosa, ending the Tide's 31-game unbeaten streak. LSU entered the season finale at 5–5, with a chance at its first bowl bid since the end of the 1988 season. However, the Tigers gave up 412 yards rushing in a 42–24 loss to Arkansas at home. The beginning of the end for Hallman came on September 17, 1994, at Jordan–Hare Stadium against Auburn. LSU led 23–9 early in the fourth quarter, and the Bayou Bengals were in good position to end Auburn's 13-game winning streak. But LSU quarterback Jamie Howard threw two interceptions that were returned for Auburn touchdowns, tying the game. LSU regained the lead with a field goal, but when the Bayou Bengals were trying to run out the clock, Howard threw his fourth interception of the game, and incredibly, Auburn returned the pick for another touchdown, giving the home team a 30–26 lead. LSU drove into Auburn territory in the game's final minute, but Howard threw his fifth and sixth interceptions on consecutive drives, sealing the win for Auburn. LSU never recovered, and ultimately finished 4–7. On November 12, LSU lost to Southern Miss, Hallman's former team, 20–18 in front of the smallest Death Valley crowd since 1974 (announced attendance was 51,718, but LSU officials estimated the actual crowd was closer to 40,000). Two days later, LSU athletic director Joe Dean gave Hallman an ultimatum–resign or be fired. When Hallman refused to resign, Dean fired him, though he was allowed to finish out the season. He closed out his career at LSU with a 30–12 win over Arkansas—the Tigers' first regular-season win in the series since 1956. His overall record was 16–28; his winning percentage of .364 is the worst for a non-interim coach in school history.

=== Gerry DiNardo (1995–1999) ===
On December 13, 1994, LSU hired Vanderbilt head coach Gerry DiNardo as Hallman's replacement. Prior to the 1995 season, DiNardo petitioned the NCAA to reverse a rule which had been in place since 1983 that prohibited teams from wearing white jerseys at home. After the ruling, LSU was able to wear its white jerseys at home in Tiger Stadium for the first time since 1982. For its first home game of the 1995 season in what was dubbed the "Bring Back the Magic" Game, LSU in white jerseys upset No. 5 Auburn, winning 12–6. With no time remaining in the game, LSU defensive back Troy Twillie intercepted Auburn quarterback Patrick Nix's 11-yard pass into the end zone to secure the victory. The Tigers achieved their first winning season in six seasons and finished with a 7–4–1 record defeating a Nick Saban led Michigan State team in the 1995 Independence Bowl.

After nine straight losses to Steve Spurrier-led Florida, the No. 14 Tigers defeated the No. 1 ranked defending national champion Gators 28–21 in Tiger Stadium in 1997. LSU running back Kevin Faulk was featured on the following week's cover of Sports Illustrated with the title "See you later, Gators." In a game referred to as, "No. 1 Falls," it was the first time LSU defeated a No. 1 ranked team and the first time the goalposts were ever torn down in Tiger Stadium. In 1998, LSU started the season with a preseason ranking of No. 9. They climbed to No. 6 before losing to No. 12 Georgia on October 3. The next week the No. 11-ranked Tigers lost to the No. 6 Florida. After the loss to the Gators, LSU dropped 13 of the next 17 games, including losses to a No. 10 Notre Dame and No. 13 Arkansas later in the 1998 season. In 1999 LSU lost to No. 10 Georgia, No. 8 Florida, No. 12 Mississippi State, No. 25 Ole Miss, and No. 12 Alabama. On November 15, 1999, two days after the Tigers lost to unranked Houston at home, LSU chancellor Mark Emmert fired DiNardo with one game remaining in the season. DiNardo was given the option to coach the final game of the season against Arkansas, but DiNardo declined. Instead, offensive line coach Hal Hunter was named interim coach, leading LSU to a 35–10 victory over the Razorbacks.

=== Nick Saban (2000–2004) ===
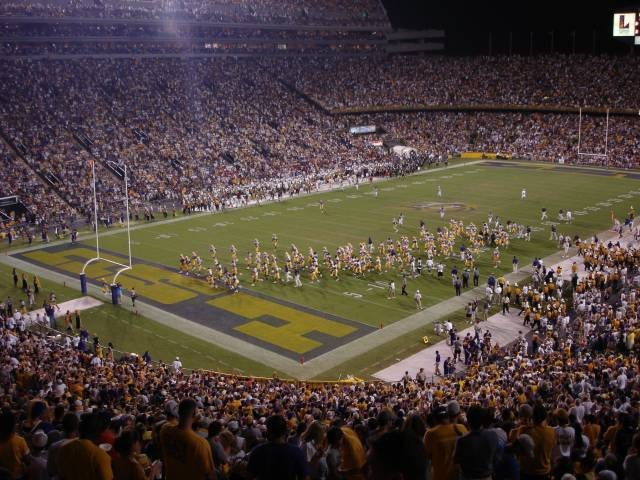
Arkansas vs. LSU, 2004

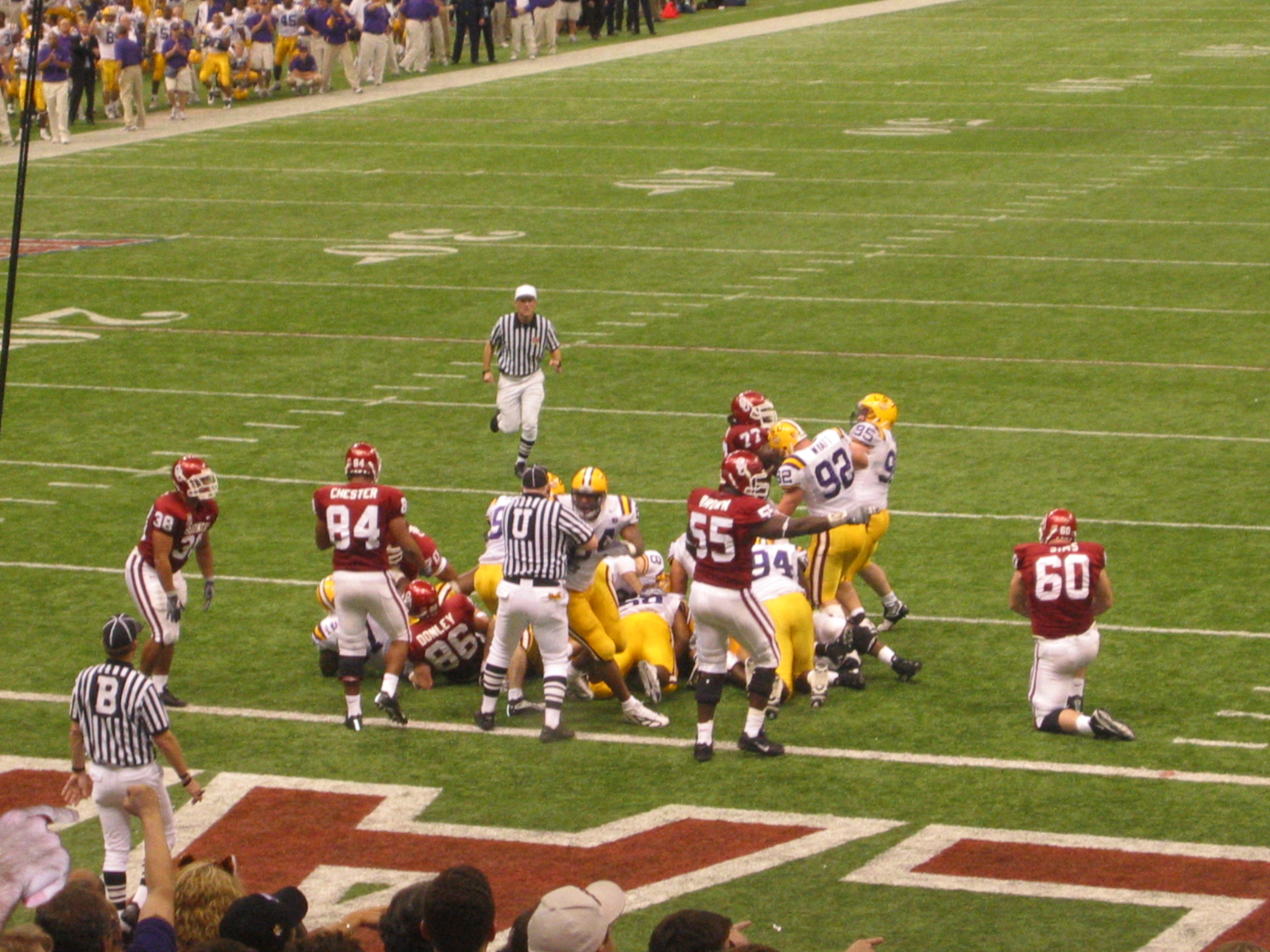
2004 Sugar Bowl (BCS National Championship Game), LSU 21 – Oklahoma 14

On December 1, 1999, LSU hired Michigan State head coach Nick Saban as DiNardo's replacement. In Saban's first season of 2000, LSU returned to national prominence by beating No. 11 Tennessee in overtime 38–31 on ESPN, after which the goal posts were torn down for only the 2nd time in the history of Tiger Stadium. The victory over Tennessee also marked the first time that LSU played in an overtime game at home. Just a few weeks later, the goal posts were again ripped down as LSU beat Alabama 30–28 on CBS in Baton Rouge for the first time in 31 years. This was the 3rd and final time that the goal posts came down in Death Valley.

In 2001, No. 21 LSU staged an upset victory over No. 2 Tennessee in the SEC Championship, winning 31–20. The victory earned LSU a spot in its first Sugar Bowl since 1986, and knocked the Volunteers out of national title contention. No. 16 LSU survived an upset bid from unranked Kentucky in 2002 by winning the game 33–30 on a miraculous 75-yard Hail Mary pass as time expired known as the "Bluegrass Miracle". Kentucky coach Guy Morriss had received the traditional Gatorade bath right before the Hail Mary. Kentucky fans, believing they had won, had already rushed the field and torn down one goal post.

In 2003, No. 11 LSU outlasted No. 7 Georgia, 17–10. With ESPN College Gameday on hand for the first time since 1997, Quarterback Matt Mauck found wide receiver Skyler Green for a 34-yard touchdown with 3:03 remaining in the game. All-American cornerback Corey Webster sealed the victory with an interception in the final minute. The contest dubbed the "Let the Valley Shake" Game is notable for LSU fans chanting LSU-LSU after a Georgia touchdown. Georgia head coach Mark Richt was quoted as saying, "Usually when the opposing team does well, the crowd quiets down. All I began to hear was a chant, 'L-S-U, L-S-U.' It got louder and louder and louder. It was the loudest I've ever heard a stadium." The win catapulted LSU onto the national scene. LSU won its second title and became the BCS national champion by defeating Oklahoma 21–14 in the 2004 Sugar Bowl (BCS National Championship Game).

The following season saw the Tigers post a 9–3 record, ending the year with a No. 16 ranking after a loss in the 2005 Capital One Bowl on a final play touchdown pass. Prior to the game, Saban announced that he would be leaving LSU to become the head coach for the Miami Dolphins.

=== Les Miles (2005–2016) ===
On January 4, 2005, Oklahoma State head coach Les Miles was named the new LSU head coach. In Miles's first season in 2005 at LSU was moved to Arizona State's Sun Devil Stadium due to the effects of Hurricane Katrina. With one endzone painted with "www.KatrinaSRF.com" and the other with "Together We Stand" along with logos of the states of Louisiana and Arizona, LSU rallied in the fourth quarter for a 35–31 comeback victory. Trailing 17–7 in the fourth quarter, LSU returned a blocked field goal and punt for touchdowns to ignite the comeback. The lead went back-and-forth with Arizona State taking a 31–28 lead with 4:07 to play. Quarterback JaMarcus Russell then lead the Tigers on a 10-play, 91-yard drive capped with a 39-yard touchdown pass to Early Doucet on fourth-and-10 to give LSU a 35–31 lead. LSU's defense then stopped Arizona State on downs at the LSU 30-yard line to secure the victory. In 2006, Russell completed a touchdown pass to WR Early Doucet with 9 seconds to go to beat Tennessee in Neyland Stadium after a breakout performance by Tennessee backup QB Jonathan Crompton.

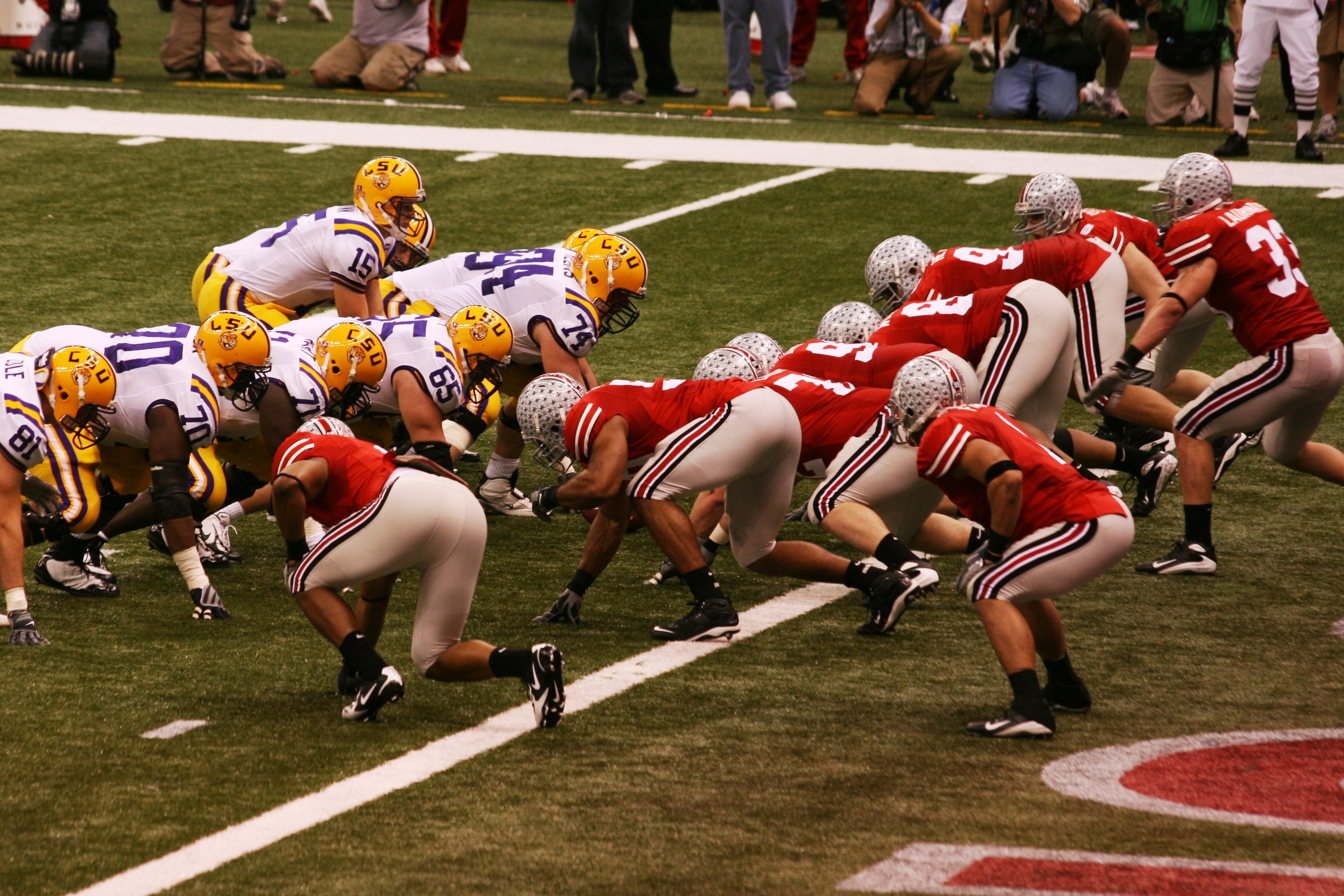
2008 BCS National Championship Game, LSU 38 – Ohio State 24

No. 2 LSU played what was hyped as one of the most exciting games ever played in Tiger Stadium against No. 9 Florida in 2007. The game is also known for the LSU students leaving thousands of messages on the phone of Florida quarterback, Tim Tebow, prompting him to give a "telephone" hand gesture to the LSU student section following an early touchdown. Florida began the fourth quarter with a 24–14 lead, but behind solid defense and being a perfect 5 for 5 on fourth down conversions, the Tigers were able to take the lead 28–24 with 1:06 left in the game after a Jacob Hester touchdown to defeat the Gators. It was LSU's first national primetime game on CBS since 1981 and the game has been dubbed, "Primetime Drama." LSU went on to defeat No. 1 Ohio State in the BCS national championship 38–24, becoming the first school to win two BCS national championship titles and improving their BCS record to 4–0, the best of any team. They also became the first two loss team to ever play in the BCS national championship.

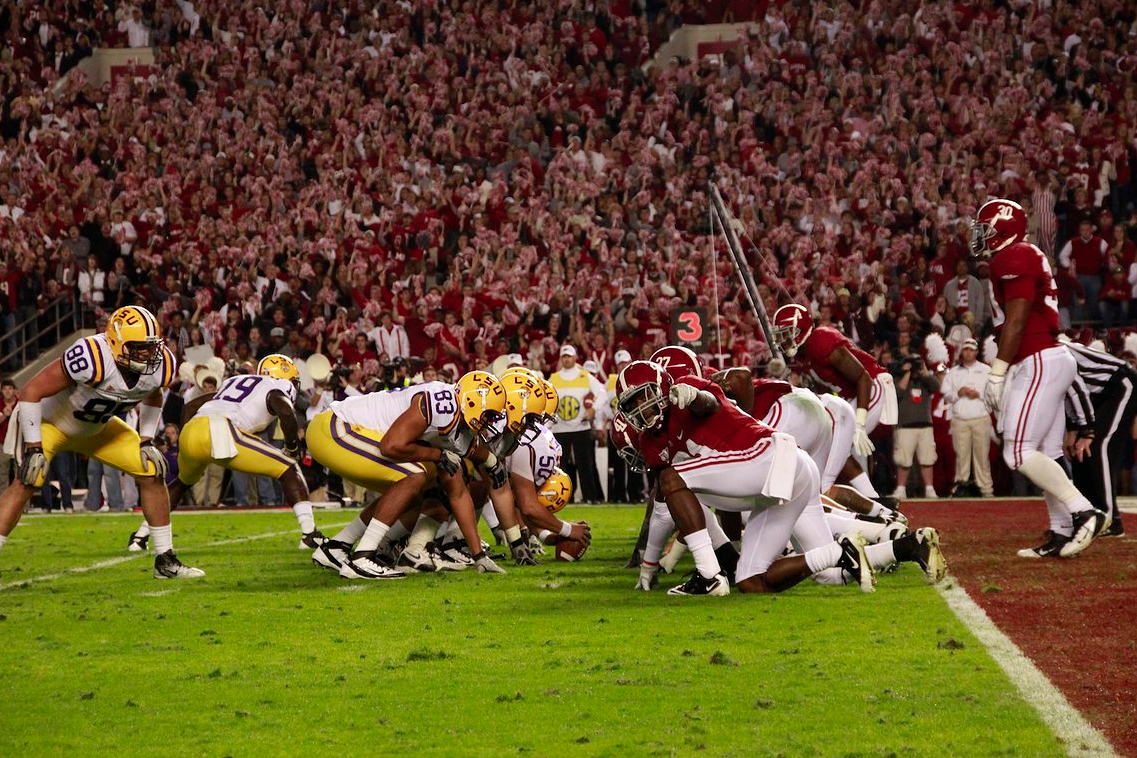
LSU vs. Alabama, 2011 "Game of the Century"

In the 5th game of the 2010 season, undefeated No. 12 LSU trailed the Volunteers 14–10 with 0:04 left on the clock and the ball spotted on Tennessee's 2-yard line. On 3rd and goal, after a failed quarterback sneak attempt and with time disappearing off the clock, LSU attempted to send in several players for a substitution package. Seeing that the time was about to expire, center T-Bob Hebert snapped the ball before quarterback Jordan Jefferson was ready, the ball was fumbled, Jefferson was tackled, and the clock expired. On further review, Tennessee was penalized half the distance to the goalline for illegal participation. Amid the confusion in the waning seconds, Tennessee coaches sent 4 players onto the field when they saw LSU make a substitution. Only two players then left the field, leaving the Volunteers with 13 players lined up on defense. Due to the penalty, LSU got the ball back for a single untimed play on the 1-yard line. With the last play, running back Stevan Ridley received the toss sweep, charging forward, only to be hit near the line of scrimmage, but continued to drive forward through two Tennessee defenders and into the endzone for the game-winning score.

The ninth regulation game of the 2011 season for LSU found the No. 1 nationally ranked Tigers against the No. 2 Alabama Crimson Tide in a match called the "Game of the Century" or the "Matchup of the Year". Both teams were undefeated and both were also coming off a bye week; viewed as important to the BCS Championship game as the "inside track" by many of the sportswriters, the press built up the game in a Super Bowl-style atmosphere. Ultimately, the game came down to field position and a series of field goals as the top-ranked defense of both teams prevented any touchdowns. Alabama missed three field goals and a fourth was blocked during regulation, leading to a 6–6 tie heading into overtime. On the first possession of overtime, Alabama again missed a field goal from 52 yards out, only to watch LSU earn the win on the next possession with a chip-shot field goal. As a result, it was the second-lowest scoring matchup between No. 1 and No. 2 teams in the history of the NCAA, with a 9–6 decision. For the first time in BCS National Championship history, two SEC teams, the No. 1 LSU Tigers and the No. 2 Alabama Crimson Tide, again faced each other in the National Championship Game. Alabama won the game, 21–0. The SEC-only title game added impetus to the push for a national playoff system and hastened the death of the BCS system as implemented up to that time. Having lost three straight games after a 7–0 start into the season, rumors were floating that LSU would buy-out Miles' contract after the 2015 season. However, Miles was retained for the 2016 season. On September 25, 2016, LSU fired Miles and offensive coordinator Cam Cameron after an 18–13 loss to Auburn the previous day and a 2–2 start to begin the season.

=== Ed Orgeron (2016–2021) ===
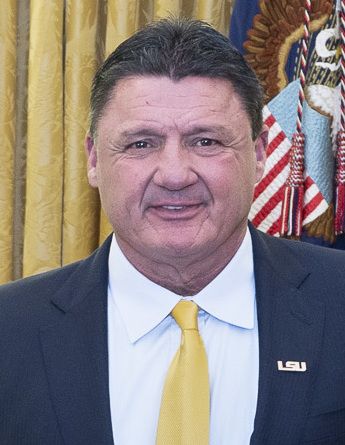
Ed Orgeron

After the firing of Les Miles, defensive line coach Ed Orgeron became LSU's interim head coach. Orgeron stated that he was going to "flip the script". He promoted tight ends coach Steve Ensminger to offensive coordinator and brought back Pete Jenkins to take over as defensive line coach. Orgeron also decided to shorten practices and spend more time in the film room in order to keep players fresh. In addition, he brought the "theme of daily practices" he modeled from coach Pete Carroll during Orgeron's first stint as an assistant at USC. These practice days have descriptive nicknames like Tell the Truth Monday, Competition Tuesday, Turnover Wednesday, No Repeat Thursday, and Focus Friday. Under Orgeron's watch, LSU finished out the season with a 6–2 record. Later in 2016, he was hired as the full-time head coach.

The beginning of the 2017 season saw Orgeron hire Matt Canada to be the offensive coordinator. Canada was known for an offensive playbook that was heavily based on setting skilled positions in motion prior to the snap, thus using jet sweeps often. The season began with LSU ranked in the top 15, but early losses to Mississippi State and Troy quickly found LSU unranked. However, the team went 7–2 in their remaining games, finishing the year with a 9–4 record.

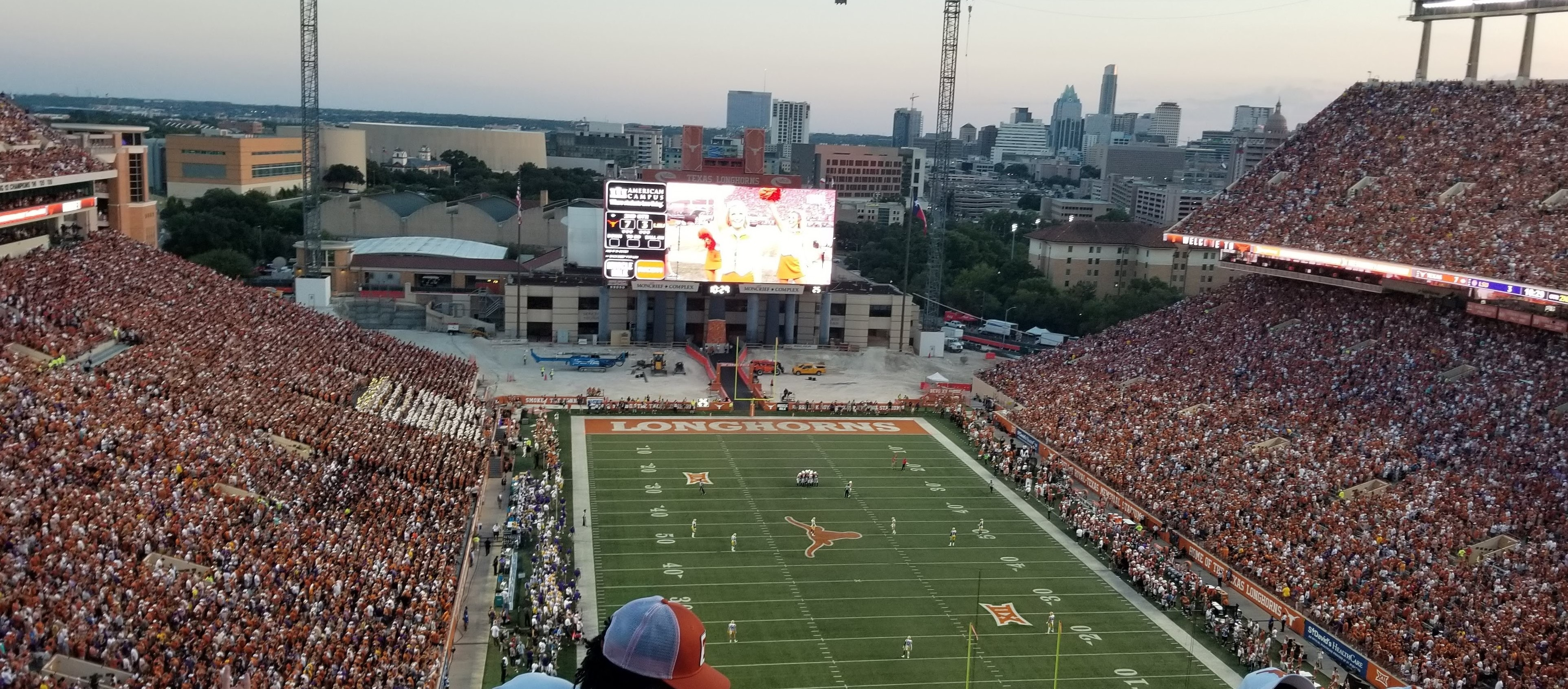
LSU vs. Texas, 2019 "3rd and 17"

The 2018 season began with a season opening upset of 8th-ranked Miami, followed by another upset of 7th-ranked Auburn. These victories helped LSU rise to 5th in the CFP rankings, but a loss to 25th-ranked Florida sent LSU tumbling back to 13th. In response, the Tigers pulled off a shocking upset of No. 2 Georgia. The Tigers then avenged the previous year's loss to Mississippi State. The victories over Georgia and Mississippi State propelled LSU to being ranked No. 3 by the CFP going into a game against top-ranked Alabama. The LSU offense that had seemed to turn around after Steve Ensminger took over the duties of offensive coordinator was unable to score against Alabama's defense. After the loss to Alabama, LSU was able to defeat Arkansas and Rice before falling to Texas A&M in a 7-overtime game. With a 9–3 record, LSU was invited to the Fiesta Bowl to play the University of Central Florida, who had not lost a game in the previous two seasons. On New Years Day 2019, LSU gave UCF their first loss since 2016. LSU finished the 2018 season with a record of 10–3 and were ranked sixth in the nation by the AP poll and seventh by the Coaches poll. LSU was not predicted to have a good season in 2018, and some, including SEC commentator Paul Finebaum, believed it would be Orgeron's last until he had a turnaround season.

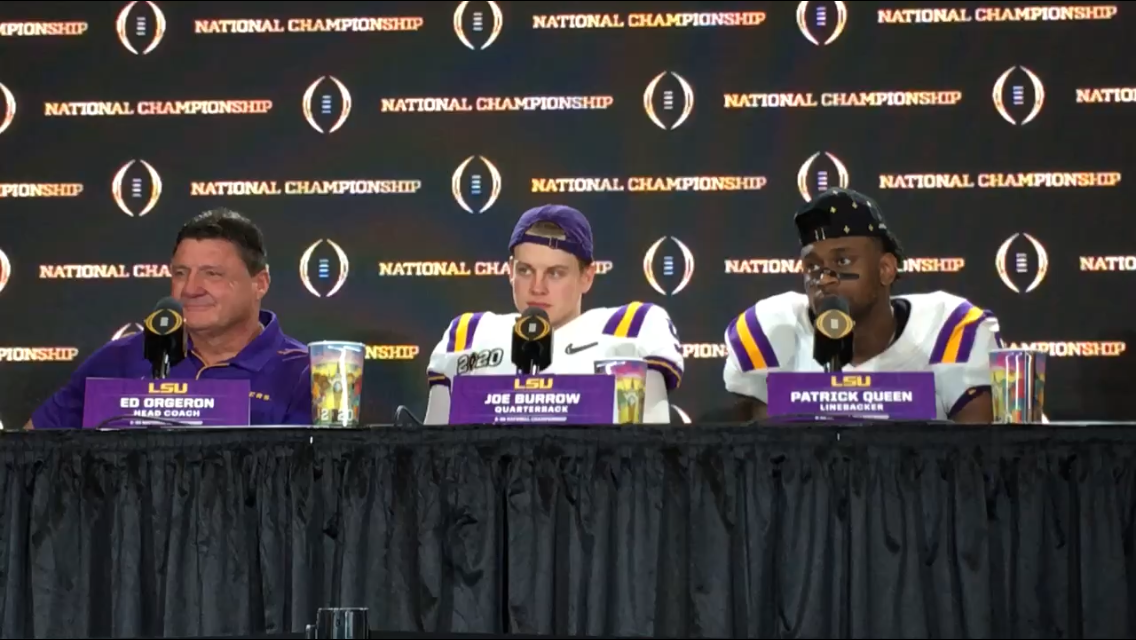
2020 College Football Playoff National Championship Game, post-game press conference, LSU 42 - Clemson 25

After opening the season with a home win versus Georgia Southern, Orgeron's 2019 team recorded a statement road win over Texas in week two. The key play of the game was a third down pass needing seventeen yards for a first down late in the fourth quarter. The Joe Burrow to Justin Jefferson pass resulted in a 61-yard touchdown sealing the victory. That play led to the game being labeled the "3rd-and-17" Game. This game propelled the team to an undefeated regular season, including a 46–41 victory over Alabama in the 2019 version of the "Game of the Century" at Bryant-Denny Stadium in Tuscaloosa. A win over Arkansas in the penultimate game of the regular season clinched the SEC West division title and secured a berth in the 2019 SEC Championship Game against Georgia. This was their first appearance in the SEC Championship Game since 2011. The traditionally defensive-minded Tigers averaged over 48 points per game, led by quarterback Joe Burrow, Baton Rouge-native running back Clyde Edwards-Helaire, and star receivers Ja'Marr Chase and Justin Jefferson. Burrow set new LSU and SEC single-season records for passing yards with 4,366; his 44 touchdown passes set a new LSU record and tied the SEC mark. Orgeron's Tigers defeated the Georgia Bulldogs in the SEC Championship Game to win their first SEC title since 2011. On Sunday, December 8, 2019, they were named the No. 1 seed in the College Football Playoff. They met the Big 12 Conference champion Oklahoma Sooners in the semifinals in the Peach Bowl, defeating them by a score of 63–28. Following the regular season, Orgeron was named the winner of the 2019 AP College Football Coach of the Year Award and Home Depot Coach of the Year Award. Joe Burrow won the 2019 Heisman Trophy. On January 13, 2020, Orgeron won his first national championship as a head coach with a win over the unbeaten defending national champion Clemson Tigers, 42–25, finishing the season 15–0. Orgeron and the LSU Tigers won the national title in their home state at the Mercedes-Benz Superdome in New Orleans.

LSU's 2020 season was shortened in response to the COVID-19 pandemic. They played a ten-game, all-SEC schedule. LSU started the season ranked No. 6 in the AP Poll, but dropped out of the rankings after three games and finished the season with a record of 5–5. The Tigers had three different starting quarterbacks throughout the course of the season. Myles Brennan started the first three games, but was injured during the game against Missouri on October 10 and was lost for the season. T. J. Finley started the next five games. Max Johnson started the final two games of the season. He led the Tigers to an upset win over the No. 6 Florida Gators in Gainesville and a shootout win over Ole Miss in the season finale. In March 2021, a woman testifying in front of Louisiana state legislators claimed that she had reported an instance of sexual harassment by LSU running back Derrius Guice to Orgeron, but that the coach had taken no action against him, and in fact called the woman and asked her to forgive Guice. Despite high expectations and a favorable schedule, LSU stumbled to a 3–3 start in 2021, losing several games in which they were favored. Following the tumultuous start, Orgeron's Tigers were able to upend the No. 20-ranked Florida Gators in a thrilling rivalry game matchup. Despite the victory, LSU administrators announced the following day, on October 17, 2021, that they had reached a mutual agreement for Orgeron to leave the program at the end of the 2021 season. Orgeron's last game was a last-second victory against Texas A&M at home, which allowed the Tigers to finish the season at 6–6 and become bowl eligible. Despite this, Orgeron announced shortly after the game that he would not coach in the bowl game, and that offensive line coach Brad Davis would be named interim head coach.

=== Brian Kelly (2022–2025) ===
On November 30, 2021, Notre Dame head coach Brian Kelly was named the 33rd head coach at LSU, replacing Ed Orgeron. Kelly cited "wanting to be with the best" and "the commitment to excellence, rich traditions, and unrivaled pride and passion of LSU Football" for the move. His signed contract also more than triples his previous salary, from his 2021 salary of $2.67 million to $9 million in 2022 with the total deal being worth $95 million over ten years excluding incentives. His season started with a 24–23 loss to Florida State in the Allstate Louisiana Kickoff at the Caesars Superdome in New Orleans. Florida State had a 24–10 lead, but LSU slowly chipped away at the Seminoles' lead and scored a last-second touchdown to make the game 24–23. The Tigers opted to kick the extra point to force overtime, but Florida State was able to successfully block the kick, and thus sealed the victory. Moving forward, the Tigers would win 4 straight against Southern, Mississippi State, New Mexico, and Auburn before eventually losing to Tennessee by a score of 13–40. The Tigers would then go on to beat Florida, upset #7 ranked Ole Miss, upset #6 ranked Alabama 32–31, and beat unranked Arkansas 13–10, clinching the SEC West and earning a spot in the 2022 SEC Championship against #1 ranked Georgia. They would go on to win against UAB 41-10 but lose to Texas A&M 23–38. Kelly led LSU to a 10–3 record in 2023 and went on to compile a 9–4 record in 2024, but was fired in 2025 after a 5–3 start. His final record at LSU was 34–14.

=== Lane Kiffin (2026–present) ===
On November 30, 2025, Ole Miss head coach Lane Kiffin was named the 34th head coach in LSU program history, replacing Brian Kelly.

== Conference affiliations ==
LSU has been a member of the Southeastern Conference since its founding in 1932.

LSU has been independent and affiliated with three conferences.

- Independent (1893–1895)
- Southern Intercollegiate Athletic Association (1896–1921)
- Southern Conference (1922–1932)
- Southeastern Conference (1932–present)

== Championships ==
=== Claimed National championships ===
LSU claims four national championships (1958, 2003, 2007, and 2019) and have been selected national champions in four additional seasons (1908, 1936, 1962, 2011) by NCAA-designated major selectors. They are additionally recorded as being the Williamson System co-champions for 1935, an apparent error in the NCAA records book. In 1958 they finished as the only undefeated team with a victory over Clemson in the Sugar Bowl, and were named the national champions by both major polls (AP and Coaches). In 2003, 2007, and 2019 LSU claimed the national championship after winning a postseason bowl national championship game.

Year	Coach	Selector	Record	Bowl	Final AP	Final Coaches
1958	Paul Dietzel	AP and Coaches (Note: Other consensus selectors for 1958 included B(QPRS), BR, BS, CFRA, DeS, DuS, FN, HAF, L, NCF, PS, SR, WS)	11–0	Won Sugar Bowl	No. 1	No. 1
2003	Nick Saban	Bowl Championship Series (Note: Other consensus selectors for 2003 included A&H, BR, CM, DeS, DuS, MCFR, NFF, R(FACT), SR, USAT/ESPN, W)	13–1	Won Sugar Bowl (BCS National Championship Game)	No. 2	No. 1
2007	Les Miles	Bowl Championship Series (Note: Other consensus selectors for 2007 included AP, B(QPRS), BR, CCR, CM, FWAA, MCFR, NFF, SR, USAT, W)	12–2	Won BCS National Championship Game	No. 1	No. 1
2019	Ed Orgeron	College Football Playoff (Note: Other consensus selectors for 2019 included A&H, AP, BR, CCR, CFRA, CM, DuS, FWAA/NFF, MCFR, SR, USAT/AMWAY, W)	15–0	Won Peach Bowl (College Football Playoff Semifinal); Won College Football Playoff National Championship Game	No. 1	No. 1

Claimed national championships:

1958 national championship
The 1958 LSU Tigers football team under head coach Paul Dietzel, cruised to an undefeated season capped by a win over Clemson in the 1959 Sugar Bowl. LSU was named the national champion in both the AP Poll and the Coaches' Poll prior to their 7-0 Sugar Bowl victory over Clemson. LSU's shutout victory over #12 Clemson was convincing and highlighted LSU as the only team in the country to go undefeated. Army, Auburn, and Air Force did not lose all season but they each had one game that ended in a tie. It was the first recognized national championship for LSU in the poll era. With a 10–0 regular season record, LSU was crowned national champion by the Associated Press and the Coaches' Poll (UPI), as well as by 37 other selectors. LSU's total first place votes was 130 to win the 1958 National Championship in the AP poll. LSU received 29 of the 35 first-place votes to win the #1 ranking in the Coaches poll. LSU earned the #1 rankings in the AP and Coaches poll during week 6 and held on to the #1 rankings for the rest of the year to win the 1958 National Championship in both major polls.

2003 national championship
The 2003 LSU Tigers football team was coached by Nick Saban. LSU won the BCS National Championship, the first national championship for LSU since 1958. The Tigers battled for an 11–1 regular season record and then defeated Georgia in the SEC Championship Game. The LSU Tigers faced off against Oklahoma for the Bowl Championship Series (BCS) national title. LSU beat Oklahoma 21–14 in the 2004 Sugar Bowl designated as the BCS National Championship Game.

2007 national championship
The 2007 LSU Tigers football team, coached by Les Miles, won the Southeastern Conference championship and the national championship with a 12–2 record. The LSU Tigers took on the top ranked Ohio State Buckeyes in the 2008 BCS National Championship Game defeating them 38–24. This win made the LSU Tigers the first team to win two BCS National Championships in its history. On their way to the BCS championship, the Tigers won their tenth Southeastern Conference championship by defeating Tennessee in the 2007 SEC Championship Game. LSU became the first program to win multiple BCS National Championship Games and the second program to win a national championship with multiple losses.

2019 national championship
The 2019 LSU Tigers football team, coached by Ed Orgeron, won the Southeastern Conference championship and the national championship with a 15–0 record. The LSU Tigers defeated the Clemson Tigers in the 2020 College Football Playoff National Championship defeating them 42–25. On their way to the College Football Playoff National Championship, the Tigers won their twelfth Southeastern Conference championship by defeating Georgia in the 2019 SEC Championship Game.

=== Conference championships ===
LSU has won a total of 16 conference championships in three different conferences. Since becoming a founding member of the Southeastern Conference (SEC) in 1933, LSU has won 12 SEC championships.

Year	Conference	Coach	Overall record	Conference record
1896†	SIAA	Allen Jeardeau	6–0	4–0
1902‡	SIAA	W. S. Borland	6–1	5–1
1908	SIAA	Edgar R. Wingard	10–0	3–0
1932†	SoCon	Biff Jones	6–3–1	4–0
1935	SEC	Bernie Moore	9–2–0	5–0
1936	SEC	Bernie Moore	9–1–1	6–0
1958	SEC	Paul Dietzel	11–0	6–0
1961†	SEC	Paul Dietzel	10–1	6–0
1970	SEC	Charles McClendon	9–3	5–0
1986	SEC	Bill Arnsparger	9–3	5–1
1988†	SEC	Mike Archer	8–4	6–1
2001	SEC	Nick Saban	10–3	5–3
2003	SEC	Nick Saban	13–1	7–1
2007	SEC	Les Miles	12–2	6–2
2011	SEC	Les Miles	13–1	8–0
2019	SEC	Ed Orgeron	15–0	8–0

‡ LSU claims a co-championship, while Clemson claims a sole championship.

=== Division championships ===
Since the SEC began divisional play in 1992, LSU has won or shared the SEC West title 10 times, and is 5–2 in the SEC Championship game.

Year	Division	Opponent	SEC CG Result
1996†	SEC West	N/A (lost tiebreaker to Alabama)	
1997†	SEC West	N/A (lost tiebreaker to Auburn)	
2001†	SEC West	Tennessee	W 31–20
2002†	SEC West	N/A (lost tiebreaker to Arkansas)	
2003†	SEC West	Georgia	W 34–13
2005†	SEC West	Georgia	L 14–34
2007	SEC West	Tennessee	W 21–14
2011	SEC West	Georgia	W 42–10
2019	SEC West	Georgia	W 37–10
2022	SEC West	Georgia	L 30–50

== Logos and uniforms ==
Helmets
Pre-1946, LSU wore leather helmets. From 1947 through 1955, LSU wore an old gold helmet. In 1956, head coach Paul Dietzel changed the color of the helmet to a yellow-gold similar to that of the Green Bay Packers. It featured a white one-inch center stripe with purple three-quarter inch flanking stripes. From 1957 through 1971, LSU added jersey numbers to the sides of the helmet. In 1972, the first logo was introduced, a tiger head inside a purple circle with LSU written underneath the tiger head. In 1977, LSU introduced its current helmet. The logo features curved LSU lettering written above the Tiger head logo. Purple face masks were introduced in 1980. In 2014, LSU introduced a new Tiger head logo.

Special helmets

- In 1997, LSU wore white helmets in the Independence Bowl vs Notre Dame.
- In 2007, LSU wore white helmets in a game against Tulane to promote relief for Hurricane Katrina.
- In 2009, LSU wore "old" gold styled helmets in a game against Arkansas as part of a Nike Pro Combat promotion. The uniforms were donned "Couchon De Lait" which is cajun for pig roast. The name stemmed from LSU's proximity to the cajun culture of the nearby Acadiana area and the mascot of Arkansas being the razorbacks, a type of wild boar or pig.
- In 2011 for a Nike Pro Combat promotion, the Tigers wore a white helmet with old gold and purple stripes to accompany a white uniform.
- In 2015, LSU wore their white helmets in a game against South Carolina that was moved from Williams-Brice Stadium to Tiger Stadium due to the flooding disaster in South Carolina and again at Ole Miss where LSU wore all-white uniforms. The Tigers wore those helmets again for 2019 games vs. Northwestern State and Vanderbilt.
- A special throwback helmet with LSU's original "L" that is still used by their L Club and the jersey number of each player was used in a home game against Mississippi State in 2016 along with a special gold throwback jersey with a custom number font replicating jerseys from the Y. A. Tittle era at LSU.
- The Tigers wore purple helmets for their 2018 home game vs. Mississippi State.
- In 2021, the Tigers wore white helmets along with their all-white uniform for their home game vs. Texas A&M, and repeated this for their 2022 game vs. Tennessee.

Jerseys

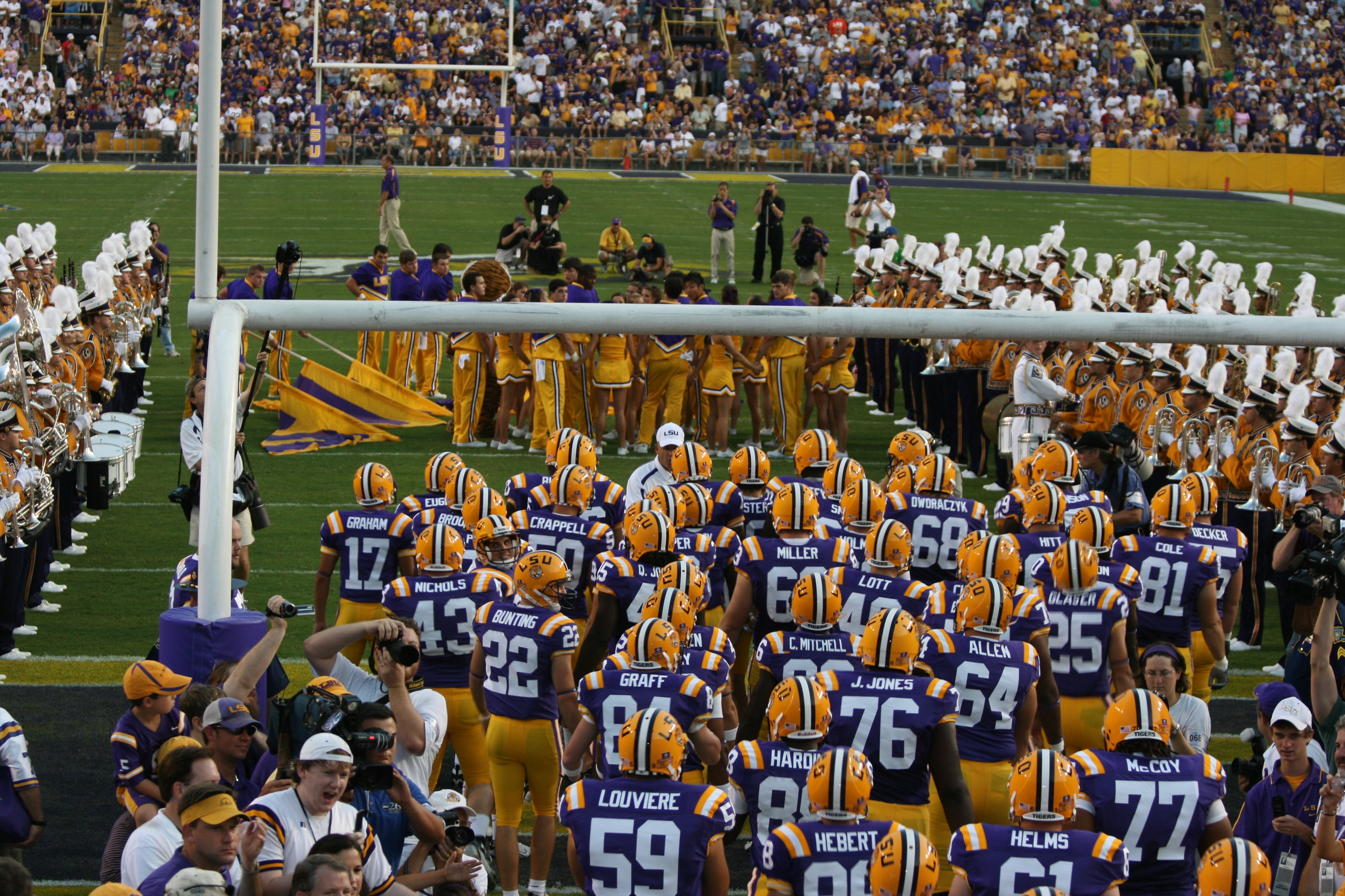
The Tigers coming out of the tunnel

The current style of jerseys were introduced by coach Paul Dietzel in 1957 with "TV" numerals on the shoulders. Those numbers were moved to the sleeves in 1959. LSU's white jerseys have purple numbers on the front, back and sleeves with a gold center stripe flanked by two purple stripes encircling the shoulders. LSU's purple jerseys have white numbers on the front, back and sleeves with a white center stripe flanked by two yellow stripes encircling the shoulders.

Names were added to the backs of jerseys in 1972.

LSU has worn gold jerseys four times recently: vs. Vanderbilt in 1996, vs. Notre Dame in the 1997 Independence Bowl, at Florida in 1998 and throwbacks vs. Mississippi State in 2016. LSU also wore gold jerseys as their primary jerseys during the 1940s. Save for the throwback jerseys, LSU wore gold due to the intense dislike of purple exhibited by then-LSU coach Gerry DiNardo. DiNardo's successor, Nick Saban, resurrected purple jerseys for the second game of the 2000 season vs. Houston.

Since the wearing of white jerseys has become a tradition for LSU football, the white jerseys are typically worn for both home and away games. The exception is for non-SEC home games, other than the home opener, where LSU wears purple jerseys. Also, though rare, in the case of away games the home teams may choose to wear white, and if so, purple is the default for LSU; this occurred in the 2004 season opener vs. Oregon State, which did not want to wear its black jerseys in the intense Louisiana heat.

In 2015, South Carolina was forced to move its scheduled home game vs. LSU to Baton Rouge due to severe flooding in Columbia, South Carolina. Prior to the site change, the Gamecocks declared they would wear white jerseys at Williams-Brice Stadium, so the Tigers wore purple jerseys for the first time for an SEC game in Tiger Stadium (South Carolina was the designated home team) since 1994 vs. Alabama.

In 2019, LSU was asked by the Southeastern Conference to wear purple jerseys for its away game vs. Vanderbilt to provide sufficient contrast to the Commodores' gray jerseys.

From 1983 through 1994, LSU was mandated to wear purple jerseys at home, due to an NCAA rule which required the visiting team to wear white jerseys (LSU wore white jerseys as the designated home team for the 1987 Sugar Bowl vs. Nebraska and 1987 Gator Bowl vs. South Carolina). In 1995, the NCAA changed the rule to allow the home team to wear white if it obtained prior approval of the visiting team. In 1997, the Southeastern Conference ruled the home team would have choice of jersey color without consent of the visitors for conference games.

Pants

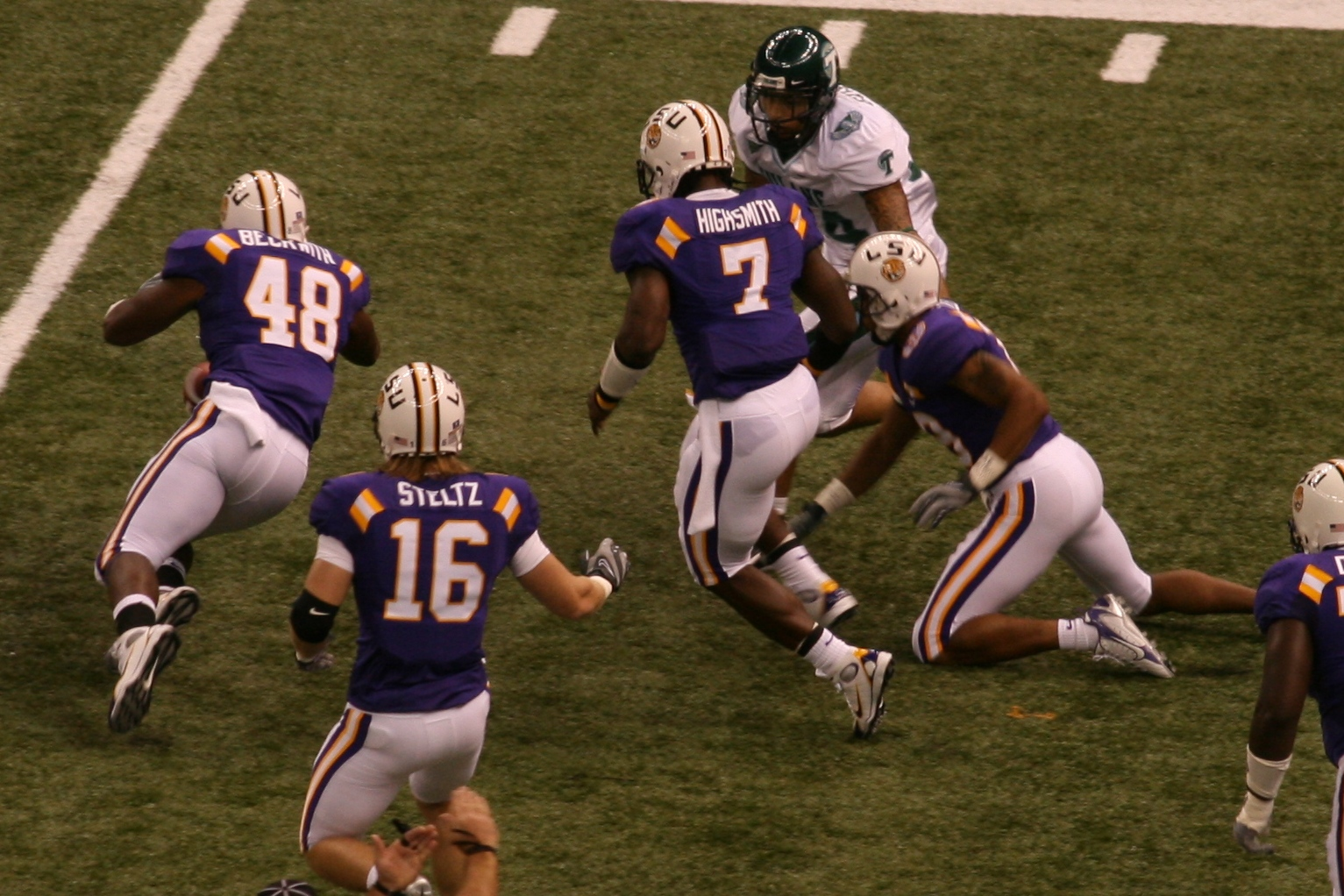
LSU on defense

The team traditionally wears one style of pants, which are gold with white and purple trim. For a 1995 game at Kentucky, the Tigers wore purple pants, which had no stripes and a tiger head logo on the left thigh. LSU lost to the Wildcats 24–16 and the pants were never worn again.

LSU has worn white pants on 16 occasions since 1996:

- Three times with gold jerseys vs. Vanderbilt in 1996, vs. Notre Dame in the 1997 Independence Bowl, and at Florida in 1998.
- In 2016, LSU wore gold throwback jerseys with white pants vs. Mississippi State.
- Six times with purple jerseys, in a 2007 game at Tulane to promote relief for Hurricane Katrina, A 2015 game against South Carolina that was moved from Williams-Brice Stadium to Tiger Stadium due to the flood disaster in that state, a 2016 home game against Southern Miss, 2019 games vs. Northwestern State (home) and Vanderbilt (away), and 2022 vs. New Mexico (home).
- Seven times with white jerseys, in a 2009 game against Arkansas, a 2011 game against Auburn for a Nike Pro Combat promotion, a 2015 game at Ole Miss, a 2018 home game vs. Mississippi State when LSU wore special white jerseys to commemorate the 100th anniversary of the end of World War I. These uniforms were made to look like white tigers, 2021 vs. Texas A&M and 2022 vs. Tennessee.

== Traditions ==
=== Tiger Stadium ===
5-yard lines – Tiger Stadium is notable for putting all 5-yard line numbers on the field, not just those that are multiples of 10. However, the 10-yard line numbers are the only numbers that get directional arrows, as the rules make no provision for 5-yard line numbers.

H-style goal posts – LSU's Tiger Stadium sports "H" style goal posts, as opposed to the more modern "Y" style used by most other schools today. This "H" style allows the team to run through the goal post in the north end zone when entering the field.

The crossbar from the goalposts which stood in the north end zone of Tiger Stadium from 1955 through 1984 is now mounted above the door which leads from LSU's locker room onto the playing field. The crossbar is painted with the word "WIN!", and superstition dictates every player entering the field touch the bar on his way out the door.

Night games in Tiger Stadium – The tradition of playing night games in Tiger Stadium began on October 3, 1931, when LSU defeated Spring Hill 35–0. Several reasons were cited for playing at night such as avoiding the heat and humidity of afternoon games, avoiding scheduling conflicts with Tulane and Loyola football and giving more fans the opportunity to see the Tigers play. Attendance increased and night football became an LSU tradition. LSU has also traditionally played better during night games based on winning percentage.

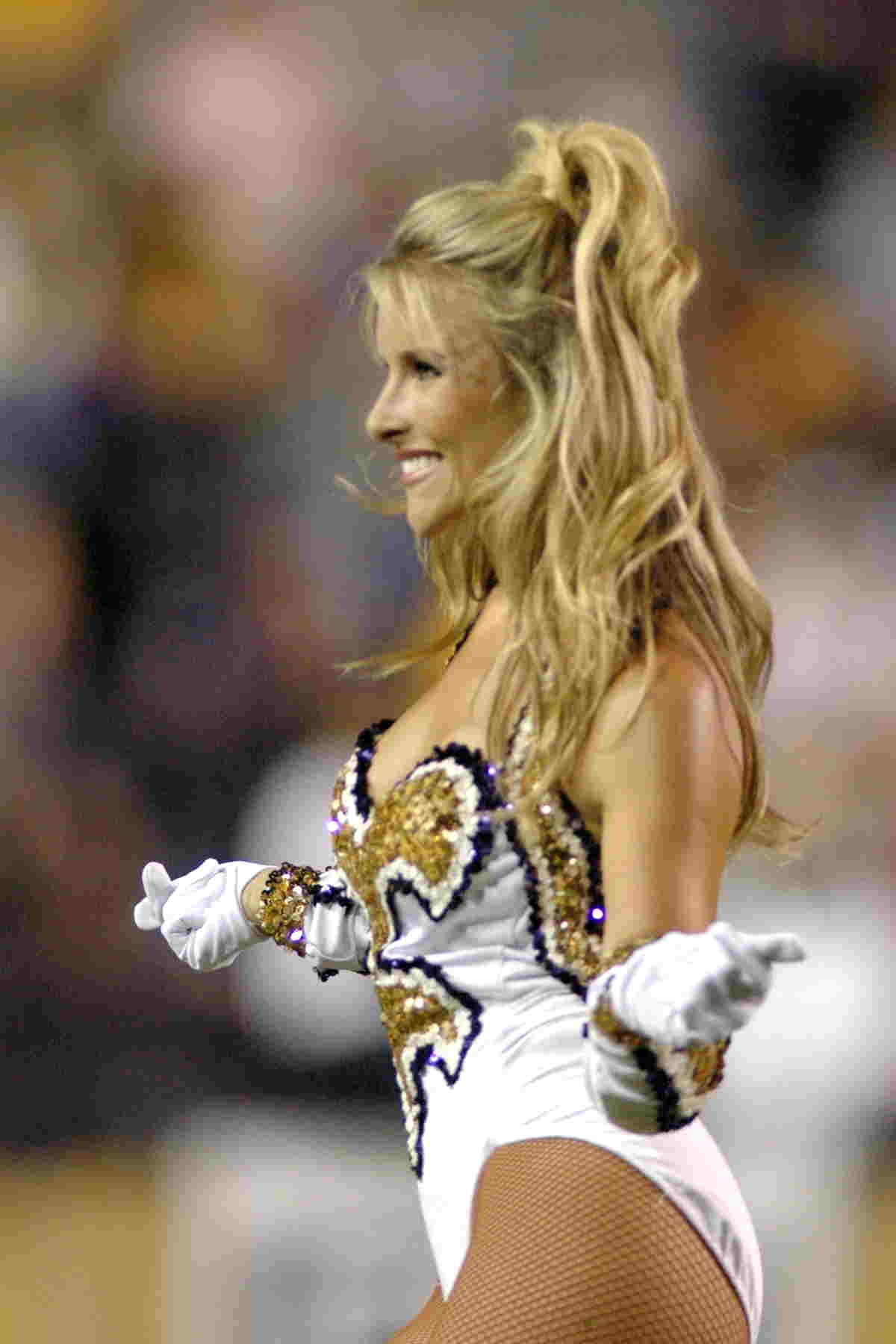
LSU Golden Girls

Pregame show – Louisiana State University Tiger Marching Band "pregame show" was created in 1964, and revised over the next nine years into its current format. The marching band lines up along the end zone shortly before kick off. Then the band strikes up a drum cadence and begins to spread out evenly across the field. When the front of the band reaches the center of the field, the band stops and begins to play an arrangement of "Pregame" (Hold That Tiger). While it does this, the band turns to salute the fans in all four corners of the stadium. Then the band, resuming its march across the field, begins playing "Touchdown for LSU".

Tailgating – For home football games, thousands of LSU fans gather on the Baton Rouge campus. They set up motor homes and tents as early as Thursday before Saturday football games. Tailgating is found across the entire campus with many fans tailgating in the same spot year after year.

LSU has been consistently ranked as the top tailgating location in the country. ESPN.com ranked LSU as the top tailgating destination in America. The Sporting News proclaimed "Saturday Night in Death Valley" and Tiger tailgating as the top tradition in college football. Sports Illustrated said, "When It Comes To Great Tailgating, Nothing Compares To LSU." LSU's tailgating was named No. 1 in an Associated Press poll on top tailgating spots and by a CNN network survey on top tailgating locations.

Victory Gold – In 2012, a new tradition was established at Tiger Stadium. Following an LSU football victory, the lights that illuminate the upper arches on the north end of the stadium light up in LSU "Victory Gold".

Victory Hill – The LSU football players, coaches, cheerleaders and Mike the Tiger in his cage, "Walk Down Victory Hill" on North Stadium Drive prior to each home game on their way to Tiger Stadium. Thousands of fans line both sides of the road to watch and cheer for the Tigers football team. The practice was started under head coach Gerry Dinardo and it endures today.

The LSU Tiger Marching Band or The Golden Band from Tigerland, Golden Girls and Colorguard, "March Down Victory Hill" about an hour prior to each home game. Fans line both sides of the road and listen for the cadence of drums announcing the band's departure from the Greek Theatre and await the arrival of the band. The band stops on top of Victory Hill and begins to play their drum cadence while beginning to march down Victory Hill. The band then stops on Victory Hill and begins to play the opening strains of the "Pregame Salute." Then, while playing the introduction to "Touchdown for LSU," the band begins to run in tempo through the streets and down the hill amidst the crowd of cheering fans. From there, the band enters the PMAC and plays a pep rally for TAF members.

White jerseys – LSU is notable as one of the few college football teams that wears white jerseys for home games as opposed to their darker jerseys (in their case, purple). Most other NCAA football teams wear their darker jerseys in home games, even though football is one of the few college sports that do not require a specific jersey type for each respective team (for instance, college basketball requires home teams to wear white or light-colored jerseys while the away team wears their darker jerseys), and is similar to the National Football League in letting the home team decide what to wear.

The tradition started in 1958, when Coach Paul Dietzel decided that LSU would wear white jerseys for home games. Another story is the tradition first started when Dietzel had LSU wear white at home for good luck against a ranked Georgia Tech team in 1957 because Georgia Tech's team had long been known for wearing white at home. LSU won the game and he continued that tradition for the 1958 season and LSU went on to win the national championship that year. Since the 1958 championship season, LSU continued to wear white jerseys at home games through the 18-year tenure of Charles McClendon. Then in 1983, new NCAA rules prohibited teams from wearing white jerseys at home. Because of this, LSU wore purple jerseys during home games from 1983 to 1994. The team's fans believed wearing purple jerseys were "bad luck" and often complained about being forced to wear purple jerseys at home.

In 1995, LSU's new coach, Gerry DiNardo, was determined to restore LSU's tradition of white home jerseys. DiNardo personally met with each member of the NCAA Football Rules Committee, lobbying LSU's case. DiNardo was successful, and LSU again began wearing white jerseys at home when the 1995 season began. In LSU's first home game with the white jerseys, unranked LSU prevailed in a 12–6 upset victory over No. 6 Auburn.

The 1995 rule allowing LSU to wear white at home had one stipulation: the visiting team must agree for conference and non-conference games. In 1997, the SEC amended its rule to allow the home team its choice of jersey color for conference games without prior approval of the visiting team. Therefore, only for non-conference home games does the home team seek permission to wear white jerseys at home. In 2009, the NCAA further relaxed the previous rule that required most away teams to wear white. The rule now states that teams must simply wear contrasting colors.

After the 1995 rule change, on three occasions LSU was forced to wear colored jerseys at Tiger Stadium. The first time was in 1996 against Vanderbilt, who was still angry at LSU for hiring Gerry DiNardo, who left Vanderbilt to become LSU's head coach after the 1994 season. LSU wore gold jerseys for that game (a 35–0 LSU victory), and fans were encouraged to wear white in an effort to "white out" the Commodores. The other was in 2004 when Oregon State did not want to suffer in its black jerseys due to the humid weather of Louisiana in late summer, thus forcing LSU to wear its purple jerseys for a nationally televised game on ESPN. On October 10, 2015, LSU was scheduled to play a road conference game at South Carolina, but due to massive flooding in the state of South Carolina, the game was relocated from Columbia to Baton Rouge. Despite the game being played at Tiger Stadium, South Carolina was still the designated home team and had first choice of jersey selection. South Carolina chose to wear white as they had originally planned, forcing LSU to wear their purple jerseys at Tiger Stadium for an SEC game for the first time since 1994.

After the 1995 rule change, LSU was forced to wear colored jerseys on the road on five occasions. In 1998 and 2000, Florida coach Steve Spurrier exercised this option and forced LSU to don a colored jersey at Gainesville. The Tigers wore gold in 1998 under Gerry DiNardo (lost 22–10) and purple in 2000 under Nick Saban (lost 41–9). In 2007 and 2009, LSU also wore its purple jerseys on the road at Mississippi State, but the Tigers emerged victorious both times (45–0 in 2007 and 30–26 in 2009). In 2019, LSU was asked to wear purple jerseys by Vanderbilt for the meeting at Nashville to provide sufficient contrast with the Commordores' battleship gray set. The eventual national champions vanquished Vandy 66-38 wearing purple jerseys and white pants.

LSU wore purple jerseys at home for its 2024 regular season finale, a 37–17 victory vs. Oklahoma. It was the first regular season meeting between the Tigers and Sooners, who joined the SEC in July 2024 after 28 seasons in the Big 12.

=== Songs and cheers ===
Callin' Baton Rouge – The Garth Brooks song "Callin' Baton Rouge" is played at each game.

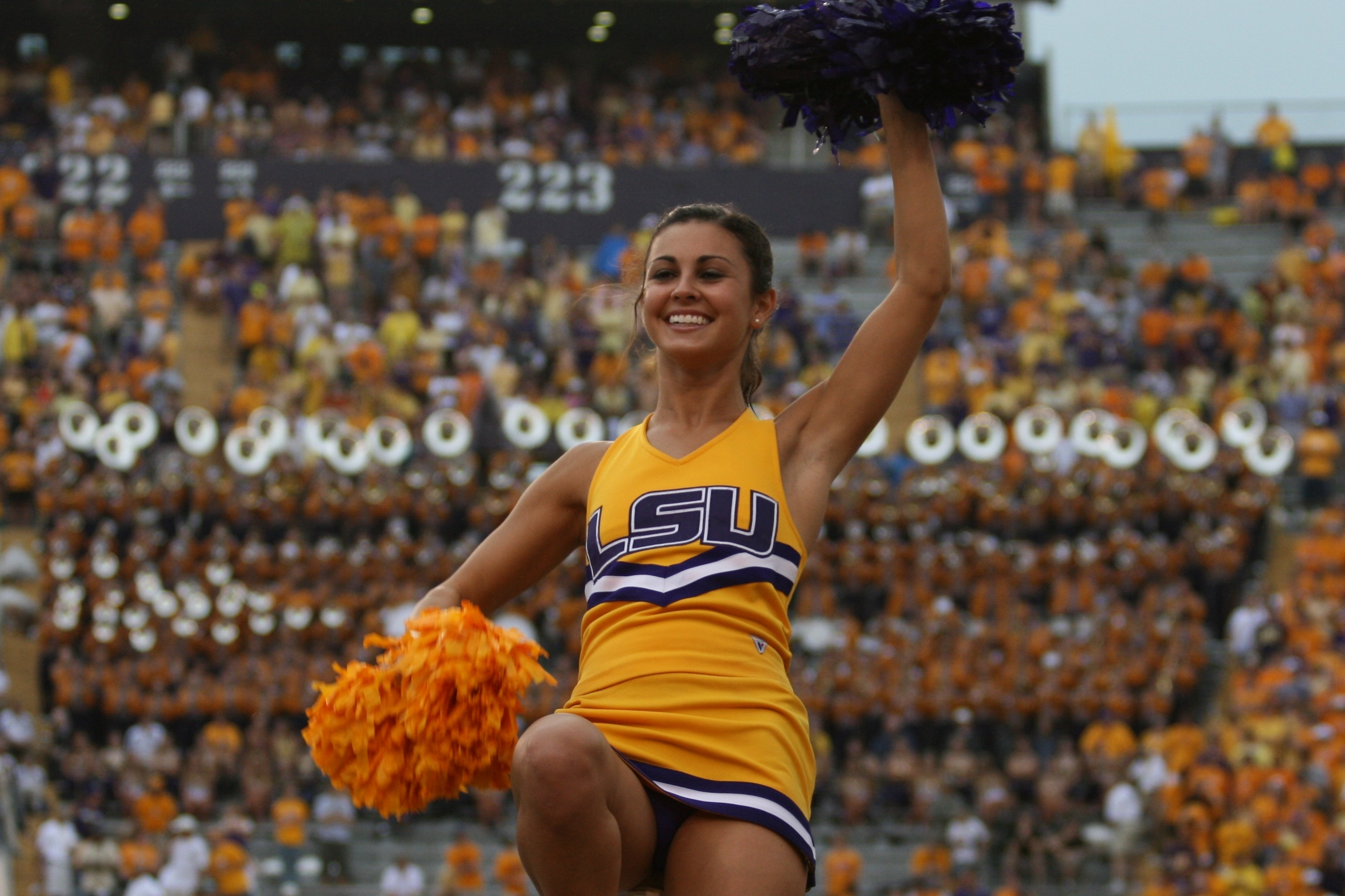
LSU cheerleader

Geaux Tigers – A common cheer for all LSU athletics, Geaux Tigers, pronounced "Go Tigers", is derived from a common ending in Cajun French names, -eaux. Fans began using this spelling in the 1990s to add local flavor to the standard cheer. The phrase was trademarked by the university in 2005.

Hot Boudin – A cheer before and during games about famous food in Louisiana. It goes "Hot boudin, cold coush-coush, come on tigers, push push push." Push is pronounced poosh to rhyme with coush-coush [koosh-koosh]. Coush-coush is a Cajun dish generally served for breakfast.

Neck - A rendition of "Talkin' Out the Side of Your Neck", a marching band tune commonly performed by HBCU bands. Performances of "Neck" have been infamous due to a vulgar chant based on the song's chorus ("Suck that Tiger dick, bitch"). In an effort to curb the chant, the tune was banned in 2010, before being allowed sparingly since 2013. During a 2018 game against Georgia, the crowd broke into the chant several times despite "Neck" never being played. The tune is reportedly planned to be included in the upcoming video game EA Sports College Football 25.

Tiger bait – LSU fans will yell "Tiger Bait, Tiger Bait" at visiting fans.

Tiger Bandits – Whenever LSU forces a turnover or gets the ball back via a defensive stop, the LSU band plays the Tiger Bandits song and LSU fans bow in respect to the defensive stop. The original title of the song was called "Chinese Bandits", but the title was eventually changed to "Tiger Bandits" (or just simply "Bandits") to make the tradition more inclusive. The term "Chinese Bandits" originated as the nickname that LSU Coach Paul Dietzel gave to the defensive unit he organized in 1958, which helped LSU to win its first national championship. The next season, the 1959 Chinese Bandit defense held their opponents to an average of only 143.2 yards per game. No LSU defense since has done better.

=== Jersey No. 18 ===
Jersey No. 18 is an LSU tradition established in 2003 when quarterback Matt Mauck guided LSU to a national championship. After Mauck's final season, he passed jersey No. 18 to running back Jacob Hester, who helped LSU win the 2007 national championship. The jersey became synonymous with success on and off the field as well as having a selfless attitude. Each season, a player is chosen by the coaching staff to wear the No. 18 jersey. In 2017, it was the first year LSU awarded the jersey to two players, one each on offense and defense.

If an offensive lineman is awarded No. 18, he wears a No. 18 patch on his regular jersey instead of changing numbers. NCAA rules require offensive linemen to wear numbers 50–79.

No. 18 by season:

- 2003: Matt Mauck, quarterback
- 2004–2007: Jacob Hester, running back
- 2008–2009: Richard Dickson, tight end
- 2010: Richard Murphy, running back
- 2011: Brandon Taylor, safety
- 2012: Bennie Logan, defensive tackle
- 2013: Lamin Barrow, linebacker
- 2014: Terrence Magee, running back
- 2015–2016: Tre'Davious White, cornerback
- 2017: Christian LaCouture, defensive end and J. D. Moore, fullback
- 2018: Foster Moreau, tight end
- 2019: Lloyd Cushenberry, center and K'Lavon Chaisson, linebacker
- 2020: Chris Curry, running back and Damone Clark, linebacker
- 2021: Avery Atkins, placekicker/punter and Damone Clark, linebacker
- 2022: BJ Ojulari, defensive end
- 2023: Mekhi Wingo, defensive tackle
- 2024: Greg Penn III, linebacker and Josh Williams, running back
- 2025: Garrett Nussmeier, quarterback
- 2026: Braelin Moore, center

=== "DBU" and "WRU" ===
Beginning in 2012, LSU had a high number of defensive backs earn recognition for their play, leading to both current and former players to refer to the school as "Defensive Back University", or "DBU". This has led to a sense of pride among LSU defensive backs, who strive to continue the tradition of excellence at the position. Since 2005, 28 LSU defensive backs have been drafted into the NFL, including seven in the first round: LaRon Landry (6th pick in 2007), Patrick Peterson (5th pick in 2011), Morris Claiborne (6th pick in 2012), Eric Reid (18th pick in 2013), Jamal Adams (6th pick in 2017), Tre'Davious White (27th pick in 2017), and Derek Stingley Jr. (3rd pick in 2022).

Additionally, since 2013, LSU has also been recognized for their development of wide receivers, leading to the nickname of "Wide Receiver University", or "WRU". Particularly, LSU has been noted for its history of successful wide receiver duos, with the program having three seasons where two receivers had at least 1,000 yards receiving: 2013 (Jarvis Landry and Odell Beckham Jr.), 2019 (Ja'Marr Chase and Justin Jefferson), and 2023 (Malik Nabers and Brian Thomas Jr.). The duo of Chase and Jefferson were considered instrumental pieces in the team's 2019 national championship run. Since 2014, five LSU receivers have been drafted in the first round of the NFL Draft: Beckham Jr. (12th pick in 2014), Jefferson (22nd pick in 2020), Chase (5th pick in 2021), Nabers (6th pick in 2024), and Thomas Jr. (23rd pick in 2024).

== Rivalries ==
=== Alabama ===
LSU and Alabama have played every year since the 1960s. It has been mentioned by the LSU fan base, the origins of the rivalry date back to a 15-game undefeated streak Alabama had in Tiger Stadium, which is generally considered to be one of the most hostile atmospheres in college football. While the Alabama rivalries against Auburn and Tennessee may overshadow their rivalry with LSU, the significance of this annual rivalry increased after Alabama hired former LSU coach Nick Saban in 2007. The LSU-Alabama rivalry continued after the November 5, 2011, game and the 2012 National Championship where the two teams faced off. Alabama leads the series 58-27-5 after the Crimson Tide prevailed 20–9 on November 8, 2025.

LSU and Alabama were not selected as yearly opponents from 2026 to 2029 under the SEC's new nine-game conference schedule. The Tigers will host the Crimson Tide in 2026, with the game returning to Tuscaloosa in 2028. The 2027 season will mark the first since 1963 in which the teams do not play.

=== Arkansas ===
The Golden Boot trophy is awarded to the annual winner of the Arkansas-LSU football game.

Prior to Arkansas joining LSU in the Southeastern Conference, the two programs met a total of 36 times, including the famed Ice Bowl. The schools played against each other for the first time in 1901 in Baton Rouge, a 15-0 LSU victory. The rivalry grew while it was played annually from 1906 to 1936, with 1918 being the only year the game was not played between those dates. The series was contested in Shreveport from 1913 to 1936.

After the Razorbacks left the Southwest Conference in 1990, Arkansas joined the SEC in 1991 and rekindled the rivalry with LSU. During their first year in the SEC, Arkansas would defeat the Tigers in the Razorbacks' first game against LSU in Fayetteville, 30–6; their first victory against LSU since the Razorbacks' 32–0 shutout of the Tigers in 1929. The winner takes home the Golden Boot, a 175-pound, four foot tall, 24-karat gold trophy in the shape of the states of Arkansas and Louisiana that resembles a boot. The game, played the day after Thanksgiving until the 2010 season, was usually the last regular season game for each team and is broadcast on CBS. LSU and Arkansas now close their respective seasons against the SEC's newest members, the Tigers vs. Texas A&M and the Razorbacks vs. Missouri.

In 2002, the rivalry gained momentum as the game winner would represent the Western Division of the SEC in the SEC Championship Game. Arkansas won on a last-second touchdown pass by Matt Jones. In 2006, the Razorbacks, who had already clinched the SEC Western Division and were on a 10-game winning streak, were beaten by LSU in Little Rock. In 2007, Arkansas defeated top-ranked LSU in triple overtime, giving them their first win in Baton Rouge since 1993, and again defended the Golden Boot trophy with a last-minute touchdown drive in 2008. Fifteenth-ranked LSU won back the trophy for the first time in two years in 2009 after Razorback kicker Alex Tejada missed a field goal that would have sent the game into a second overtime, and LSU went on to lose the Capitol One Bowl. In 2011, with both teams ranked in the top 3 in the AP Poll, No. 1 LSU prevailed over No. 3 Arkansas by a score of 41–17, sending LSU to the SEC title game en route to being shutout in the 2012 BCS National Championship Game. LSU rode the momentum from the 2011 win by grinding out back-to-back one-possession wins in 2012 and 2013 against Arkansas teams that won four and three games, respectively. Arkansas returned the favor with consecutive 17-point victories in 2014 (breaking a 17-game SEC losing streak for the Hogs while pitching a 17–0 shutout against the No. 17 Tigers; Arkansas's tenth time holding LSU to 0 points and the only shutout in the series since 1995) and 2015 (a 31–14 romp in Baton Rouge which saw the unranked Razorbacks lead the No. 9 Tigers the whole game). LSU lost against Arkansas in overtime in 2021, but rebounded in 2022 to win 13–10 in Fayetteville. LSU leads the series 46*–23–2 through the 2025 season. *2 LSU wins have been vacated.

=== Auburn ===
While Auburn's rivalries against Alabama and Georgia may overshadow its rivalry with LSU, in the 2000s, LSU had a heated rivalry with the Auburn Tigers. LSU and Auburn were not yearly rivals until the SEC's 1992 expansion placed both Tiger teams in the Western Division. When the SEC discontinued divsisions after 2023, the teams were not scheduled against one another in 2024 and 2025, and were not selected as yearly opponents from 2026 through at least 2029 under the new nine-game conference schedule format.

In matchups between LSU and Auburn, the home team won every game from 2000 through 2007. LSU leads the series 33-24-1 through the 2025 season, with two LSU wins being vacated.

=== Florida ===
Although both universities were founding members of the Southeastern Conference (SEC) in December 1932, the Florida Gators and Tigers did not meet on the gridiron for the first time until 1937. LSU is Florida's permanent inter-divisional rival. LSU has played Florida every year since 1971. The longest winning streak in the LSU–Florida series is held by Florida, with nine victories from 1988 to 1996. LSU's longest winning streak is four, from 1977 to 1980. The winner of the Florida-LSU game went on to win the Bowl Championship Series (BCS) national championship game from 2006 to 2008. Some of the notable games in this rivalry include the 1960: Wristband Robbery, 1964: Hurricane Delay, 1972: Flooded Swamp, 1989: College Football's First Overtime Game, 1997: LSU's Revenge, 2006: Tebow Domination, 2007: 5 for 5 on fourth down, and 2016: Hurricane Delay Pt 2.

Florida handed LSU its most lopsided defeat in program history, a 58–3 rout at Baton Rouge in 1993.

With a few exceptions, mostly during Spurrier's coaching tenure when the Gators routinely won by large margins, this rivalry has been known for close games in recent years, with both teams usually coming into the match-up highly ranked. The Gators and Tigers have combined to win five national championships and eleven SEC titles over the past two decades. LSU regained the series lead, 35–34–3, with its 20–10 victory on September 13, 2025 (officially, Florida leads the series 34-32-3 due to LSU vacating its wins vs. the Gators from 2013 to 2015). The teams will not play in 2026 and 2028 under the SEC's new nine-game conference schedule, the first break in the series since a three-year hiatus from 1968 to 1970.

=== Mississippi State ===
The LSU–Mississippi State rivalry, is an annual football game between the Louisiana State Tigers and Mississippi State Bulldogs. Both universities are founding members of the Southeastern Conference, as well as the Western Division. This rivalry is LSU's longest rivalry with 108 meetings. LSU is second only to Ole Miss (3 games behind) on Mississippi St.'s list of most-commonly played opponents.

Mississippi State's 34–29 victory on September 20, 2014, engineered by quarterback Dak Prescott, a Louisiana native, was the Bulldogs' first over LSU since 1999, their first in Baton Rouge since 1991, and just their fourth overall since 1985. State defeated LSU 37-7 in 2017 for their first win in the series at Starkville since 1999. The Tigers lead the series 78-36-3 through the 2025 season, with two LSU wins being vacated (Mississippi State was forced to forfeit on-field wins vs. LSU in 1975 and 1976 due to use of ineligible players; the on-field record is 76-38-3). The teams did not play in 2024 and 2025, but will play again in 2026 and 2028.

=== Ole Miss ===
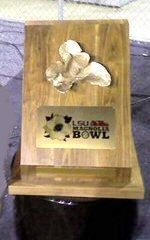
Magnolia Bowl trophy

LSU's traditional SEC rival is Ole Miss. Throughout the 50's and 60's, games between the two schools featured highly ranked squads on both sides and seemingly every contest had conference, and at times national, title implications. The Magnolia Bowl Trophy is now awarded to the winner of the LSU-Ole Miss rivalry now known as the "Magnolia Bowl". Recently, the second to last regular season game has been between these two colleges. There is still a strong rivalry between both schools.

From 1961 through 1988, LSU did not play on the Ole Miss campus in Oxford, Mississippi. Instead, all of the Rebels' home dates in the series were contested at Mississippi Veterans Memorial Stadium in Jackson. LSU and Ole Miss played at Oxford in 1989 for the first time in 29 seasons, then moved the series permanently to Vaught–Hemingway Stadium in 1994 after the 1991 and 1992 contests returned to Jackson. LSU leads the series 66-42-4 through the 2024 season, with two LSU wins being vacated.

=== Texas A&M ===
LSU and Texas A&M began play in 1899. Since then, there have been four distinct eras; 1899 to 1923, 1942 to 1975, 1986 to 1995, and the current SEC era beginning in 2011. A&M took that first matchup over LSU, 52–0. The Aggies claimed the 1899 to 1923 era with 7 wins to LSU's 3, with two tie games. LSU took the 1942 to 1975 era winning 19 to A&M's 7, with one tie game. The 1986 to 1995 era belonged again to A&M, with the Aggies winning 6 games to LSU's 4. The current era began with A&M entering the SEC in 2011. LSU claimed victory 8 times in the first 10 meetings. In 2018, the Tigers lost at Kyle Field 74–72 in a game with 7 overtimes, the most overtimes in one game in FBS history. During the series, the two teams have meet in two bowl games. LSU won in the 1944 Orange Bowl 19–14 and prevailed 41–24 in the 2011 Cotton Bowl Classic. LSU leads the series 36–24–3 through the 2024 season, with four Tigers wins being vacated.

=== Tulane ===
LSU's oldest rival is Tulane; the first LSU-Tulane football game was played in 1893 and for the first 50 or so years of Tiger football, no team was more hated by LSU fans than the Green Wave. The series, in which they battle for the Tiger Rag, was played continuously from 1919 to 1994. The intrastate rivalry featured two teams which were geographically close (Baton Rouge and New Orleans are roughly 80 miles (130 km) apart) and drew on socio-political tensions between the state's capital and seat of government and its biggest and most culturally important city. As opponents in the SIAA, Southern Conference and SEC, the Tulane rivalry flourished for many years but slowly declined after Tulane left the SEC and de-emphasized athletics. Until 1949, the series was very competitive, with LSU leading 23–18–5; since 1949, LSU has dominated, going 45–4–2. The two teams renewed the annual series in 2006 and ended it again after the 2009 meeting with LSU leading 69–23–7.

== Yearly records ==
=== All-time record vs. current SEC members ===
Through the 2025 season

School	LSU record	Streak	First meeting	Last meeting
Alabama	27–58–5	Lost 3	1895	2025
Arkansas	44–23–2	Won 4	1901	2025
Auburn	30–24–1	Won 2	1901	2023
Florida	32–34–3	Won 1	1937	2025
Georgia	18–14–1	Lost 1	1928	2022
Kentucky	39–17–1	Lost 1	1949	2021
Mississippi State	75–36–3	Won 3	1896	2023
Missouri	2–2–0	Won 1	1978	2023
Oklahoma	3–2–0	Lost 1	1949	2025
Ole Miss	64–42–4	Lost 1	1894	2025
South Carolina	19–2–1	Won 3	1930	2025
Tennessee	10–21–3	Lost 1	1925	2022
Texas	8–9–1	Won 1	1896	2019
Texas A&M	32–25–3	Lost 2	1899	2025
Vanderbilt	25–8–1	Lost 1	1902	2025

=== College Football Playoff rankings and polls ===
College Football Playoff rankings

The LSU Tigers football team finished in the Top 25 in the first College Football Playoff ranking. The Tigers finished No. 1 in the final ranking in 2019.

Preseason polls

The LSU Tigers football team has been ranked No. 1 in the Pre-season Associated Press Poll (AP Poll) in 1959 and the Pre-season Coaches' Poll in 2012.

Final polls

The LSU Tigers football team finished the season ranked No. 1 in the Final Associated Press Poll (AP Poll) in 1958, 2007, and 2019. The Tigers were ranked No. 1 in the Final Coaches' Poll in 1958, 2003, 2007, and 2019. The Tigers also finished No. 2 in the Final AP Poll in 1936, 2003, and 2011 and the Final Coaches Poll in 2011.

=== Bowl games ===
LSU has played in 56 bowl games, compiling a record of 29–24–1.

== Individual accomplishments ==
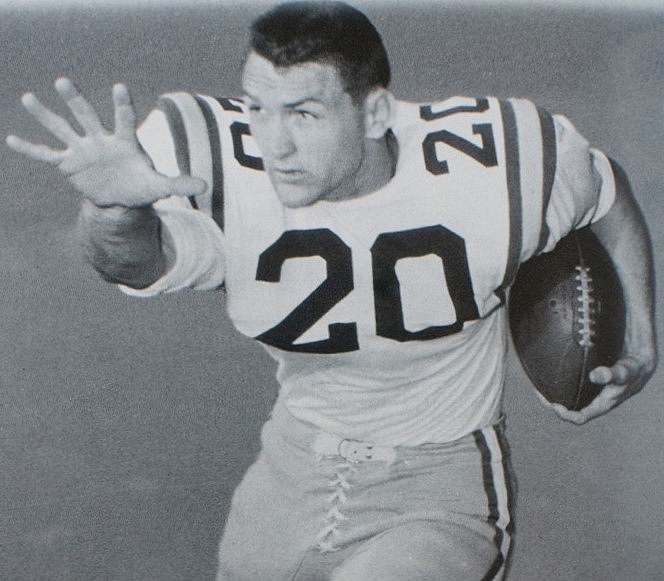
Billy Cannon (1959)

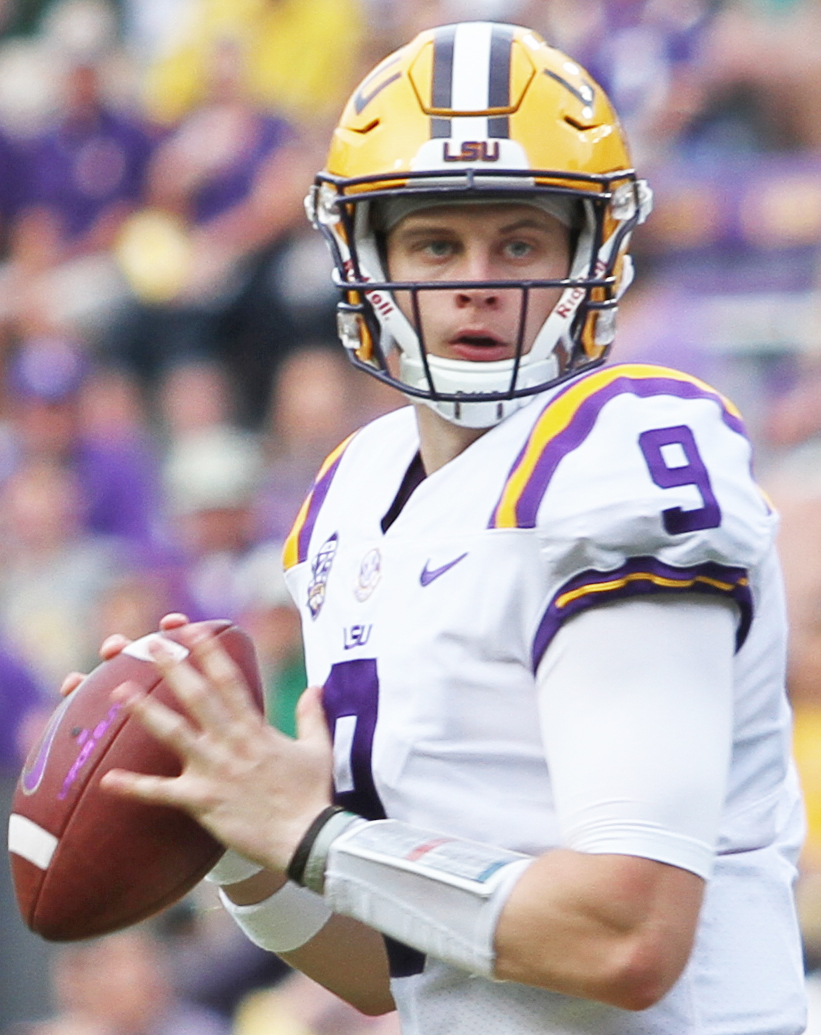
Joe Burrow (2019)

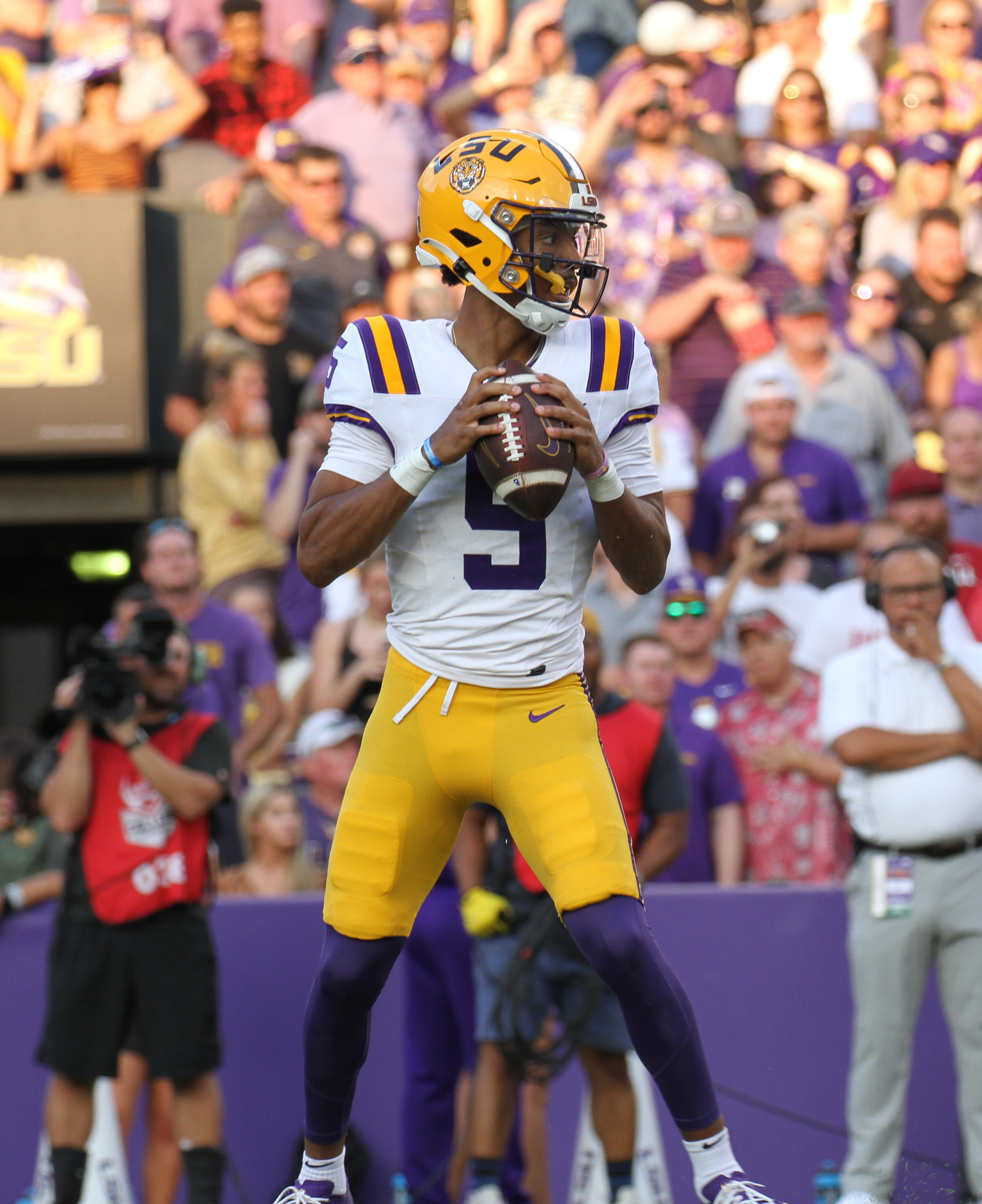
Jayden Daniels (2023)

LSU has seen three Heisman Trophy winners

=== Player awards ===
- Heisman Trophy
  Billy Cannon (1959)
  Joe Burrow (2019)
  Jayden Daniels (2023)
- AP Player of the Year
  Joe Burrow (2019)
  Jayden Daniels (2023)
- Bronko Nagurski Trophy
  Glenn Dorsey (2007)
- Chic Harley Award
  Billy Cannon (1958, 1959)
- Chuck Bednarik Award
  Patrick Peterson (2010)
  Tyrann Mathieu (2011)
- Dave Rimington Trophy
  Ben Wilkerson (2004)
- Davey O'Brien Award
  Joe Burrow (2019)
  Jayden Daniels (2023)
- Dick Butkus Award
  Devin White (2018)
- Fred Biletnikoff Award
  Josh Reed (2001)
  Ja'Marr Chase (2019)
- Jack Tatum Trophy
  Patrick Peterson (2010)
  Grant Delpit (2018)
- Jim Thorpe Award
  Patrick Peterson (2010)
  Morris Claiborne (2011)
  Grant Delpit (2019)
- Joe Moore Award
  Offensive line (2019)
- Johnny Unitas Golden Arm Award
  Joe Burrow (2019)
  Jayden Daniels (2023)
- Knute Rockne Memorial Trophy
  Ken Kavanaugh (1939)
- Lombardi Award
  Glenn Dorsey (2007)
- Lott Trophy
  Glenn Dorsey (2007)
- Manning Award
  JaMarcus Russell (2006)
  Joe Burrow (2019)
  Jayden Daniels (2023)
- Maxwell Award
  Joe Burrow (2019)
- Outland Trophy
  Glenn Dorsey (2007)
- Paul Hornung Award
  Odell Beckham Jr. (2013)
- Sporting News Player of the Year
  Billy Cannon (1958, 1959)
  Bert Jones (1972)
  Jayden Daniels (2023)
- UPI Player of the Year
  Billy Cannon (1958, 1959)
- Walter Camp Award
  Joe Burrow (2019)
  Jayden Daniels (2023)
- Walter Camp Football Foundation - All-Century Team
  Tommy Casanova (1969–1971)
- Walter Camp Memorial Trophy
  Billy Cannon (1959)
  Jerry Stovall (1962)
- William V. Campbell Trophy
  Rudy Niswanger (2005)
- Wuerffel Trophy
  Rudy Niswanger (2005)

=== Heisman Trophy voting history ===
Year	Player	Finish	Votes
1939	Ken Kavanaugh	7th	
1958	Billy Cannon	3rd	975
1959	Billy Cannon	1st	1,929
1962	Jerry Stovall	2nd	618
1972	Bert Jones	4th	351
1977	Charles Alexander	9th	54
1978	Charles Alexander	5th	282
2007	Glenn Dorsey	9th	30
2011	Tyrann Mathieu	5th	327
2015	Leonard Fournette	6th	110
2019	Joe Burrow	1st	2,608
2023	Jayden Daniels	1st	2,028

=== Coaches awards ===
- AFCA Coach of the Year
  Paul Dietzel (1958)
  Charles McClendon (1970)
  Les Miles (2011)
  Ed Orgeron (2019)
- AP Coach of the Year
  Nick Saban (2003)
  Les Miles (2011)
  Ed Orgeron (2019)
- Eddie Robinson Coach of the Year
  Paul Dietzel (1958)
  Nick Saban (2003)
  Ed Orgeron (2019)
- George Munger Award
  Ed Orgeron (2019)
- Home Depot Coach of the Year
  Les Miles (2011)
  Ed Orgeron (2019)
- Liberty Mutual Coach of the Year Award
  Les Miles (2011)
- Paul "Bear" Bryant Award
  Nick Saban (2003)
  Ed Orgeron (2019)
- Walter Camp Coach of the Year
  Jerry Stovall (1982)
  Les Miles (2011)
  Ed Orgeron (2019)
- Broyles Award (Assistant)
  John Chavis (2011)
  Joe Brady (2019)

=== All-Americans ===
LSU players have been selected as consensus All-Americans on 40 occasions through the 2023 season, with 13 selections being unanimous.

Consensus All-Americans

- Gaynell Tinsley: 1935, 1936†
- Ken Kavanaugh: 1939
- Sid Fournet: 1954
- Billy Cannon: 1958†, 1959†
- Roy Winston: 1961†
- Jerry Stovall: 1962†
- Mike Anderson: 1970
- Tommy Casanova: 1970, 1971
- Bert Jones: 1972
- Charles Alexander: 1977, 1978
- Nacho Albergamo: 1987†
- Wendell Davis: 1987
- Alan Faneca: 1997
- Chad Kessler: 1997
- Josh Reed: 2001
- Chad Lavalais: 2003
- Marcus Spears: 2004
- Ben Wilkerson: 2004
- LaRon Landry: 2006
- Glenn Dorsey: 2007†
- Craig Steltz: 2007
- Josh Jasper: 2010
- Patrick Peterson: 2010†
- Morris Claiborne: 2011†
- Tyrann Mathieu: 2011
- Leonard Fournette: 2015
- Tre'Davious White: 2016
- Grant Delpit: 2018†, 2019
- Devin White: 2018
- Greedy Williams: 2018
- Joe Burrow: 2019†
- Ja'Marr Chase: 2019†
- Derek Stingley Jr.: 2019
- Jayden Daniels: 2023
- Malik Nabers: 2023†

† Unanimous selection

=== Retired numbers ===
LSU Tigers retired numbers
No.	Player	Pos.	Tenure	No. ret.	Ref.
4	Charles Alexander	HB	1975-1978	2025	
20	Billy Cannon	HB	1957–1959	1960	
21	Jerry Stovall	HB	1960–1962	2018	
37	Tommy Casanova	S	1969–1971	2009	

=== SEC Legends ===
Starting in 1994, the Southeastern Conference has annually honored one former football player from each of the member schools as an "SEC Legend".

== LSU and the NFL ==
=== LSU Tigers players in the NFL draft ===
The LSU Tigers football team has had 381 players drafted into the National Football League (NFL). This includes 39 players taken in the first round and three overall number one picks: Billy Cannon in the 1960 NFL draft and 1960 AFL draft, Jamarcus Russell in the 2007 NFL draft and Joe Burrow in the 2020 NFL draft.

== Hall of Fame inductees ==
=== Pro Football Hall of Fame ===
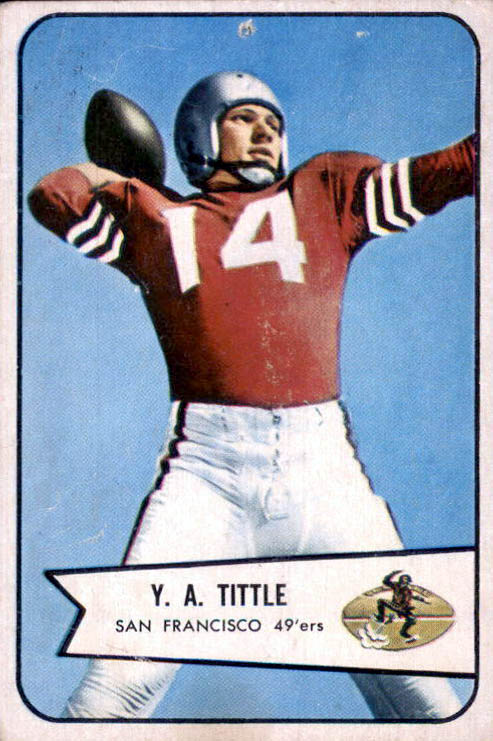
QB Y. A. Tittle

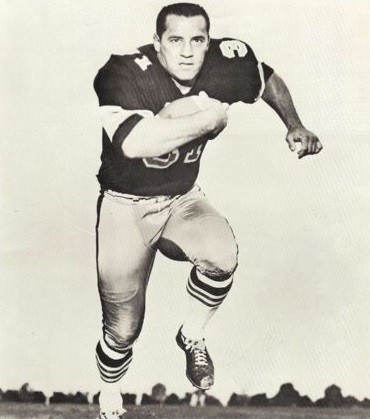
FB Jim Taylor

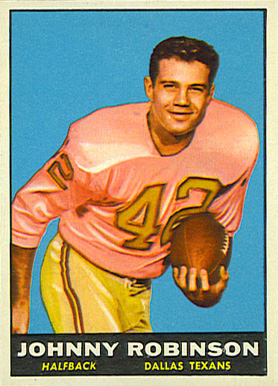
DB Johnny Robinson

Six former LSU football players have been inducted into the Pro Football Hall of Fame.

Player	Position	Seasons at LSU	Inducted
Steve Van Buren	HB	1940–1943	1965
Y. A. Tittle	QB	1944–1947	1971
Jim Taylor	FB	1956–1957	1976
Kevin Mawae	C	1989–1993	2019
Johnny Robinson	S	1957–1959	2019
Alan Faneca	G	1994–1997	2021

=== Canadian Football Hall of Fame ===
One former LSU player is a member of the Canadian Football Hall of Fame.

Player	Position	Seasons at LSU	Inducted
Ron Estay	DL	1969–1971	2003

=== College Football Hall of Fame ===
LSU has had eleven players and five head coaches inducted into the College Football Hall of Fame.

Players

Player	Position	Seasons at LSU	Inducted
Gaynell Tinsley	End	1934–1936	1956
Ken Kavanaugh	End	1937–1939	1963
Abe Mickal	RB	1933–1935	1967
Doc Fenton	QB, End	1904–1909	1971
Tommy Casanova	CB	1969–1971	1995
Billy Cannon	HB	1957–1959	2008
Jerry Stovall	HB	1960–1962	2010
Charles Alexander	HB	1975–1978	2012
Bert Jones	QB	1969–1972	2016
Glenn Dorsey	DT	2004–2007	2021
Kevin Faulk	RB	1995–1998	2022

Coaches

Coach	Seasons at LSU	Induction
Dana X. Bible	1916	1951
Michael "Iron Mike" Donahue	1923–1927	1951
Lawrence "Biff" Jones	1932–1934	1954
Bernie Moore	1935–1947	1954
Charles McClendon	1962–1979	1986

== Stadium ==
=== Tiger Stadium ===
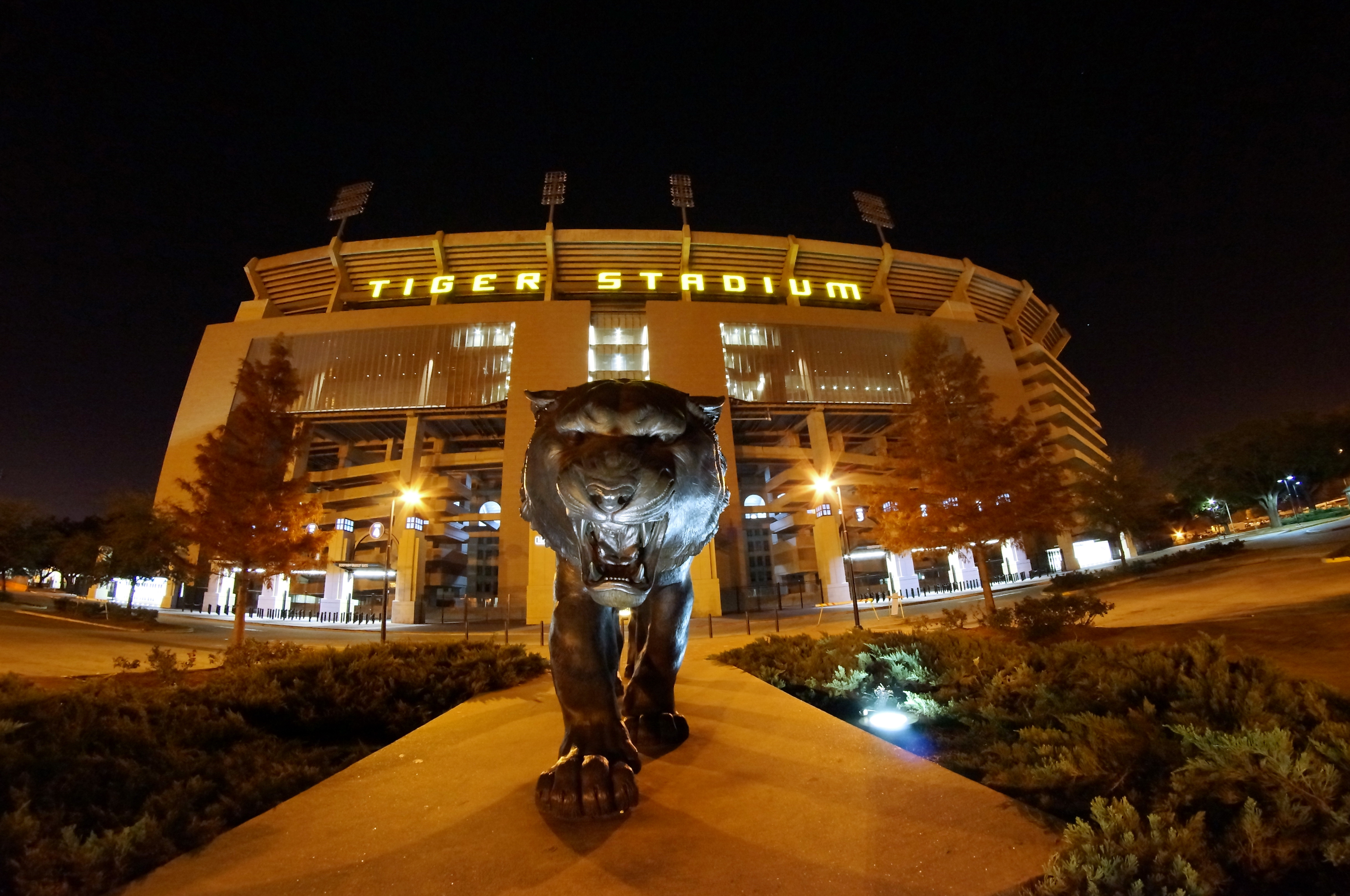
Tiger Stadium

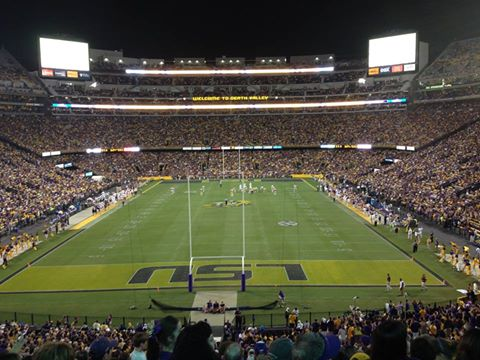
Tiger Stadium (Welcome to Death Valley)

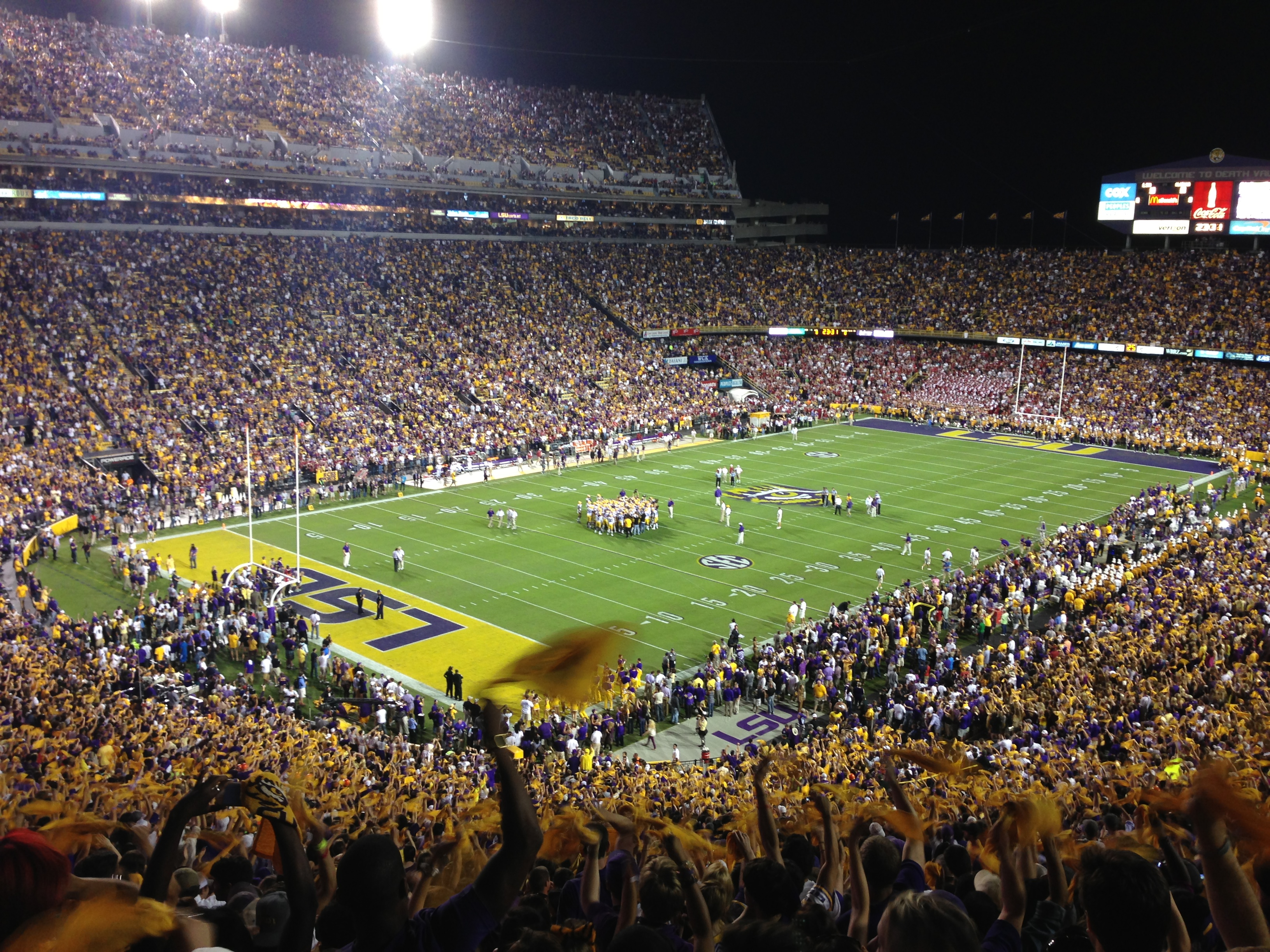
Tiger Stadium (Student Section)

Tiger Stadium is the 102,321 capacity home of the LSU Tigers football team. The stadium is the sixth largest on-campus stadium in the NCAA and the ninth largest stadium in the world. The current record attendance of 102,321 was set on September 20, 2014, when LSU played host to Mississippi State. Tiger Stadium contains 70 skyboxes, called "Tiger Den" suites and a 3,200 seat club level named "The Stadium Club". The Paul Manasseh Press Box is located in the west upper-deck. On April 27, 2012, the LSU Board of Supervisors voted unanimously in favor of an $80 million south end-zone upper deck expansion that added approximately 60 "Tiger Den" suites, 3,000 club seats and 1,500 general public seats to bring the total capacity of Tiger Stadium to 102,321, making it the 6th-largest college football stadium in the country.

Tiger Stadium first opened its gates in the fall of 1924 with a seating capacity of 12,000. In the season finale, LSU hosted Tulane in the first game. As of the 2021 season, LSU has gone on to post a 439-154-18 (.733) mark in Tiger Stadium. Moreover, Tiger Stadium is also known for night games, an idea that was first introduced in 1931 against Spring Hill (a 35-0 LSU victory). In 2006, LSU celebrated its 75th year of playing night football in Tiger Stadium. LSU has played the majority of its games at night, and the Tigers have fared better under the lights than during the day. From 1960 to 2022, LSU is 237–68–4 (.773) at night in Tiger Stadium compared to a 26–27–3 (.491) record during the day over that span. 445-155-18 (.733)

=== State Field ===
State Field was the former home stadium of the LSU Tigers football team from 1893 to 1923. The field was located on the old downtown Baton Rouge campus of LSU.

== Practice and training facilities ==
Charles McClendon Practice Facility

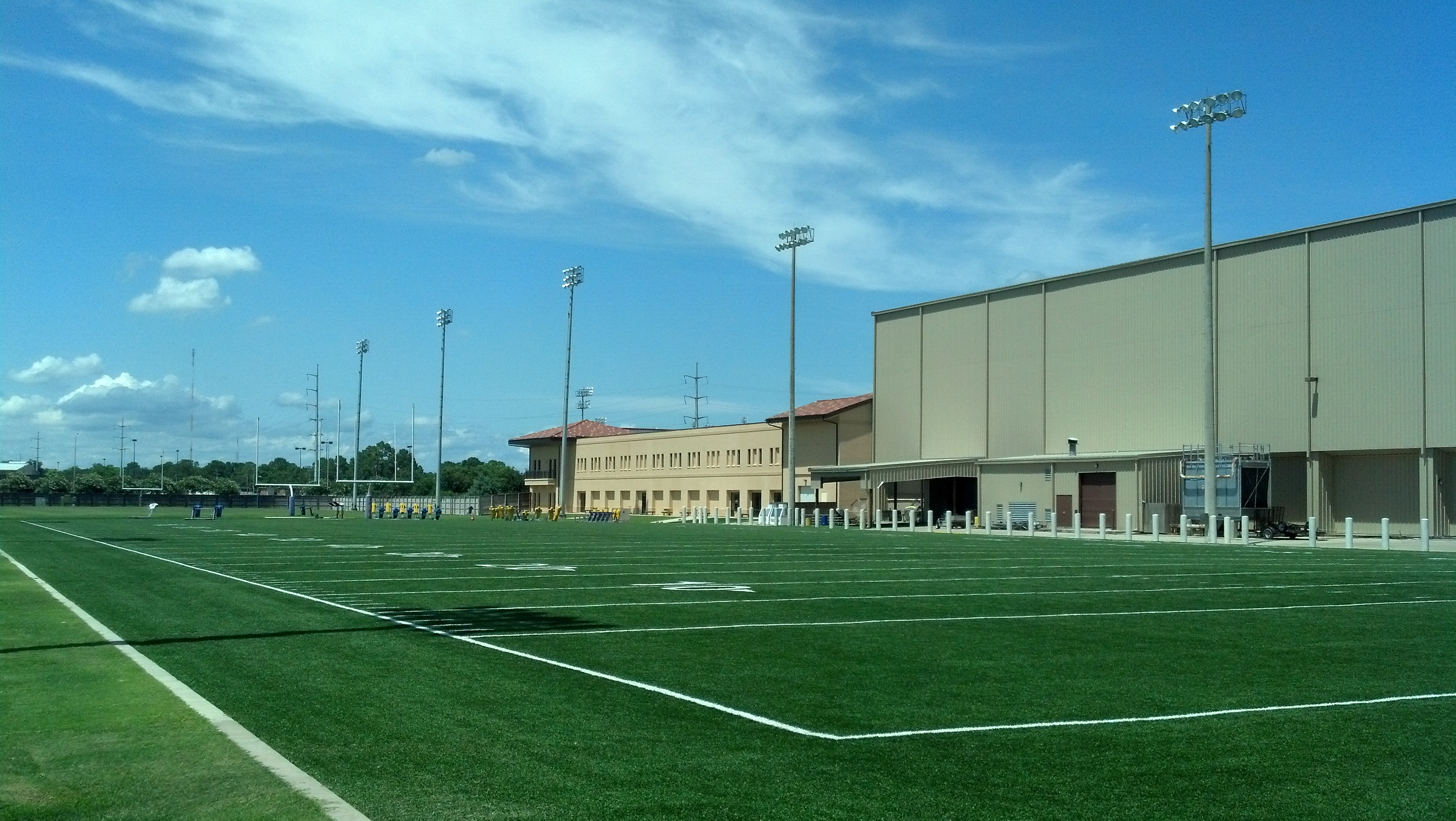
Charles McClendon Practice Facility

The Charles McClendon Practice Facility is the name of the LSU Tigers football practice facility. The facility features the LSU Football Operations Center, the Tigers Indoor Practice Facility and four outdoor 100-yard football practice fields. In 2002, it was named after former LSU head coach and College Football Hall of Fame member, Charles McClendon.

LSU Football Operations Center

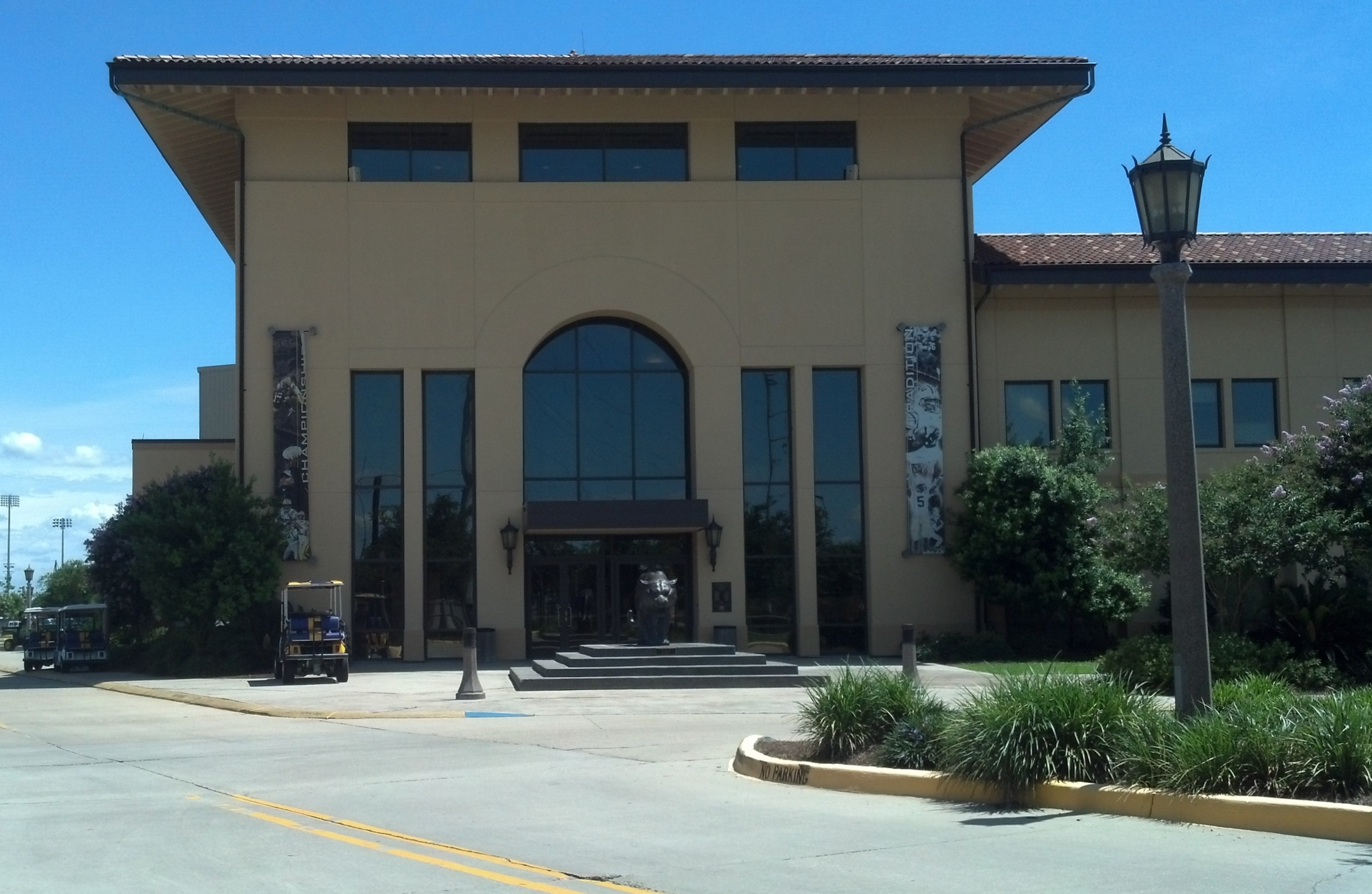
LSU Football Operations Center

The LSU Football Operations Center, built in 2006, is an all-in-one facility that includes the Tigers locker room, players' lounge, Peterson-Roberts weight room, training room, equipment room, video operations center and coaches offices. The operations center atrium holds team displays and graphics, trophy cases and memorabilia of LSU football.

LSU Indoor Practice Facility

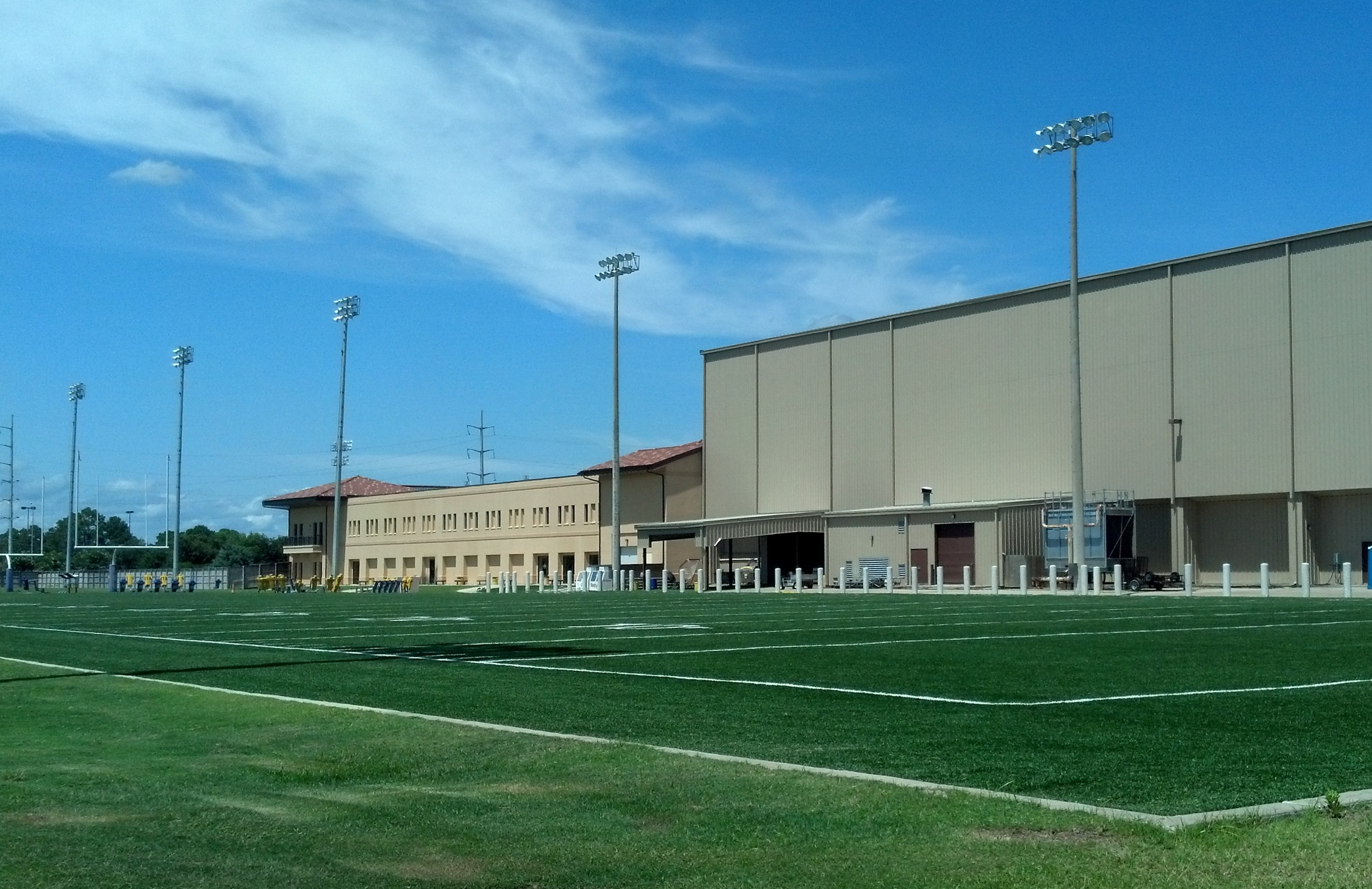
LSU Indoor Practice Facility and Outdoor Practice Fields

The LSU Indoor Practice Facility, built in 1991, is a climate-controlled 82,500 square feet facility connected to the Football Operations Center. It holds the 100-yd Anderson-Feazel LSU indoor field with Momentum Field Turf by SportExe. The indoor practice facility is located behind the football operations center.

LSU Outdoor Practice Fields

The four outdoor practice fields are directly adjacent to the football operations center and indoor practice facility. Three of the fields are natural grass, while the fourth, The Scott & Espe Moran Outdoor Turf Field has a Momentum Field Turf by SportExe playing surface.

== Head coaches ==
LSU has had 32 head coaches since organized football began in 1893. In that time, 12 coaches have led the Tigers in postseason bowl games: Bernie Moore, Gus Tinsley, Paul Dietzel, Charles McClendon, Jerry Stovall, Bill Arnsparger, Mike Archer, Gerry DiNardo, Nick Saban, Les Miles, Ed Orgeron, and Brian Kelly. Six of those coaches also won conference championships after LSU left the Southern Conference to join the SEC: Moore, Dietzel, McClendon, Arnsparger, Archer, Saban, Miles, and Orgeron won a combined 12 as a member of the SEC. During their tenures, Dietzel, Saban, Miles, and most recently Orgeron, each won national championships awarded by major selectors while with the Tigers. Of the 32 different head coaches who have led the Tigers, Dana X. Bible, Michael Donahue, Lawrence "Biff" Jones, Moore and McClendon have been inducted into the College Football Hall of Fame.

=== Coaching staff ===
LSU Tigers coaches
Coach	Position	Year	Alma mater
Lane Kiffin	Head coach	1st	Fresno State (1998)
Charlie Weis Jr.	Offensive coordinator	1st	Kansas (2015)
Blake Baker	Defensive coordinator	3rd	Tulane (2008)
Joe Houston	Special teams coordinator	1st	USC (2010)
Chris Kiffin	co-Defensive coordinator/linebackers coach	1st	Colorado State (2005)
Dane Stevens	Quarterbacks coach	1st	USC (2019)
Joe Cox	co-Offensive coordinator/Tight ends coach	1st	Georgia (2009)
Eric Wolford	Offensive line coach	1st	Kansas State (1994)
George McDonald	Passing Game Coordinator/Wide receivers coach	1st	Illinois (1999)
Kevin Smith	Assistant Head Coach/Running backs coach	1st	UCF (2015)
Sterling Lucas	Defensive line coach	1st	NC State (2012)
Jake Olsen	Safeties coach	3rd	Valley City State (2012)
Kevin Peoples	Edge Rushers coach	3rd	Carroll College (1992)
Corey Raymond	Defensive backs coach	3rd	Louisiana State (1991)
Nick Savage	Strength and conditioning coach	1st	Youngstown State (2013)

== Recruiting ==
Since 2002, LSU has been ranked in the Top 25 in recruiting ranking by multiple ranking services.

== Future opponents ==
=== Conference opponents ===
From 1992 to 2023, LSU played in the West Division of the SEC and played each opponent in the division each year along with several teams from the East Division. The SEC will expand the conference to 16 teams and will eliminate its two divisions in 2024, causing a new scheduling format for the Tigers to play against the other members of the conference. Only the 2024 conference schedule was announced on June 14, 2023, while the conference still considers a new format for the future.

=== Non-conference opponents ===
Announced schedules as of July 17, 2026

2026	2027	2028	2029	2030	2031	2032
Clemson	Northwestern State	Louisiana–Monroe	at SMU (at AT&T Stadium, Arlington)	Tulane	at Utah	Utah
Louisiana Tech	vs Houston (at NRG Stadium, Houston)	SMU	Rice			
McNeese	UTSA	Southern	McNeese			

== See also ==
- Louisiana State University traditions
- LSU Tigers and Lady Tigers
- Tiger Athletic Foundation
- List of NCAA Division I FBS football programs

== Sources ==
- Vincent, Herb (2008). LSU Football Vault: The History of the Fighting Tigers. Whitman Publishing, LLC. ISBN 978-0794824280.
