= Louisiana State University traditions =

United States university traditions

Louisiana State University is the flagship university of the state of Louisiana, United States. This article describes the traditions of the university.

Memorial Tower at LSU

== Nickname ==
LSU's men's and women's sports teams are called the Fighting Tigers, Tigers or Lady Tigers.

During its first three sports seasons, LSU played without a nickname. For the inaugural LSU–Tulane football game in 1893, the New Orleans newspapers referred to the LSU football team as the Baton Rouge "boys", but that was not an official nickname. At the start of the 1896 football season, the football team had its first nickname and was referred to as the "Pelicans". A former football player on the 1896 team said in a 1929 interview in the New Orleans Item-Tribune that the team was known as the "Pelicans" and had a Pelican insignia sewn on their jackets.

During the same fall 1896 football season, LSU first adopted its "Tigers" nickname during an undefeated football season. David F. Boyd, president of LSU, tagged the football team as the "Tigers". The school's nickname seemed like a logical choice since most collegiate teams in that year bore the names of ferocious animals and "Tigers" also referred to the Tiger Rifles. Additionally, the "Tigers" nickname has a long history in Louisiana military history. In the Mexican–American War, four different volunteer units used the nickname. One of these volunteer units was the Washington Artillery. It is a militia unit that traces its history to 1838 and has a logo that features a snarling tiger's head. The tiger symbol used by LSU came from the Washington Artillery logo. In 1955, it was head football coach Paul Dietzel and the LSU 'fourth-quarter ball club' that helped the moniker "Tigers" grow into the nickname, "Fighting Tigers".

== Mascot ==
=== Drum ===
In 1896, LSU had its first mascot. It was a greyhound named Drum. The greyhound was the pet of the LSU Commandant of Cadets, Lieutenant Charles C. Gallup.

=== Mike the Tiger ===
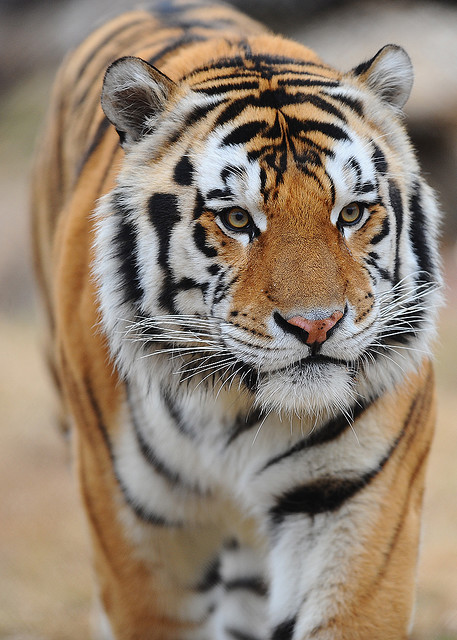
Mike the Tiger

Mike the Tiger is the official mascot of Louisiana State University in Baton Rouge, Louisiana and serves as the graphic image of LSU athletics. Mike is the name of both the live and costumed mascots. He is named after Mike Chambers who served as LSU's athletic trainer when the first mascot was purchased in 1936.

- According to folklore, LSU will score a touchdown for every one of Mike's roars on game day.
- Many students seek to take a picture with Mike on graduation day wearing cap and gown.
- After a new search for a mascot is announced, the public eagerly anticipates white smoke blowing from the LSU School of Veterinary Medicine, announcing that the new tiger has been located, mimicking the white smoke which billows from the Sistine Chapel when a new Pope is elected.

==== Mike the Tiger Habitat ====
In 2005, a new $3 million habitat was created for Mike. The Tiger Athletic Foundation (TAF) raised funds, entirely from private sources, to subsidize the construction project. The habitat (situated between Tiger Stadium and the Pete Maravich Assembly Center) features state-of-the-art technologies and includes among its amenities lush plantings, a waterfall, a flowing stream that empties into a wading pond, and rocky plateaus. The new habitat ranks among the largest and finest Tiger preserves in the country and expanded Mike's home from 2,000 to 15,000 square feet (1,400 m^{2}). It also features research, conservation, and husbandry programs, as well as educational, interpretive, and recreational activities.

== School colors ==
LSU's official colors are Royal Purple and Old Gold. This is LSU's second choice of colors with the first official school colors being blue and white.

The first association of LSU with the Royal Purple and Old Gold colors was in 1883 when the LSU Corps of Cadets was presented a flag by a ladies' organization in Baton Rouge. The flag bore the image of a pelican and the state coat of arms and it was reported that the flag was made of purple silk fringed with gold.

There is some discrepancy in the origin of LSU's current colors officially becoming Royal Purple and Old Gold. It is believed that purple and gold were first worn to officially represent the university by an LSU team on May 13, 1893 when the LSU baseball squad beat Tulane in the first intercollegiate contest played in any sport by Louisiana State University. Team captain E. B. Young reportedly hand-picked those colors for the LSU squad.

In another story, Ruffin G. Pleasant, LSU quarterback, future band director and future Louisiana governor, along with football coach Dr. Charles E. Coates changed LSU's official school colors. Later in 1893 after the first baseball game was played, the first football game in LSU history was played. On November 25, 1893, football coach/chemistry professor Dr. Charles E. Coates and some of his players went and purchased ribbon to adorn their gray jerseys as they prepared to play the first LSU football game. Stores were stocking ribbons in the colors of Mardi Gras—purple, gold and green—for the upcoming Carnival season. However, none of the green had yet arrived at Reymond's Store at the corner of Third and Main streets in Baton Rouge, Louisiana. Coates and quarterback Ruffin Pleasant bought all of the purple and gold stock and made it into rosettes and badges. Additionally, it was reported by the New Orleans Times-Democrat that "all the young ladies are preparing purple and old gold streamers for the occasion."

LSU's original school colors were white and blue chosen by LSU President David F. Boyd.

== Louisiana State University Tiger Marching Band ==
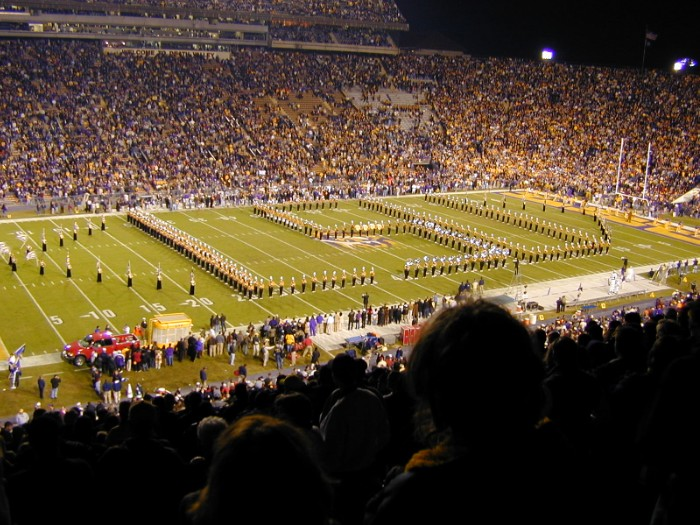
LSU band performs in Tiger Stadium.

The Louisiana State University Tiger Marching Band (also called The Golden Band from Tigerland or simply the Tiger Band) is a 325-member marching band which performs at all LSU football home games, all bowl games, and select away games and represents the University at other functions as one of its most recognizable student and spirit organizations.

The LSU Tiger Band began as a military band in 1893, organized by two students: Wylie M. Barrow and Ruffin G. Pleasant. The band remained a military cadet band until the end of World War II when the band department became a part of the School of Music.

=== Victory Hill ===
The LSU Tiger Marching Band or The Golden Band from Tigerland, Golden Girls and Colorguard, "March Down Victory Hill" about an hour prior to each home game. Fans line both sides of the road and listen for the cadence of drums announcing the band's departure from the Greek Theatre and await the arrival of the band. The band stops on top of Victory Hill and begins to play their drum cadence while beginning to "March Down Victory Hill". The band then stops on Victory Hill and begins to play the opening strains of the "Pregame Salute." Then, while playing the introduction to "Touchdown for LSU," the band begins to run in tempo through the streets and down the hill amidst the crowd of cheering fans.

=== Pregame Show ===
One of the most celebrated traditions carried on by the band is its "Pregame Show" performance at each home football game. The performance includes pieces from the band's expansive repertoire of school songs, including "Pregame Salute"/"Touchdown for LSU" arranged in 1964 by director William F. Swor specifically for the band to play during pregame.

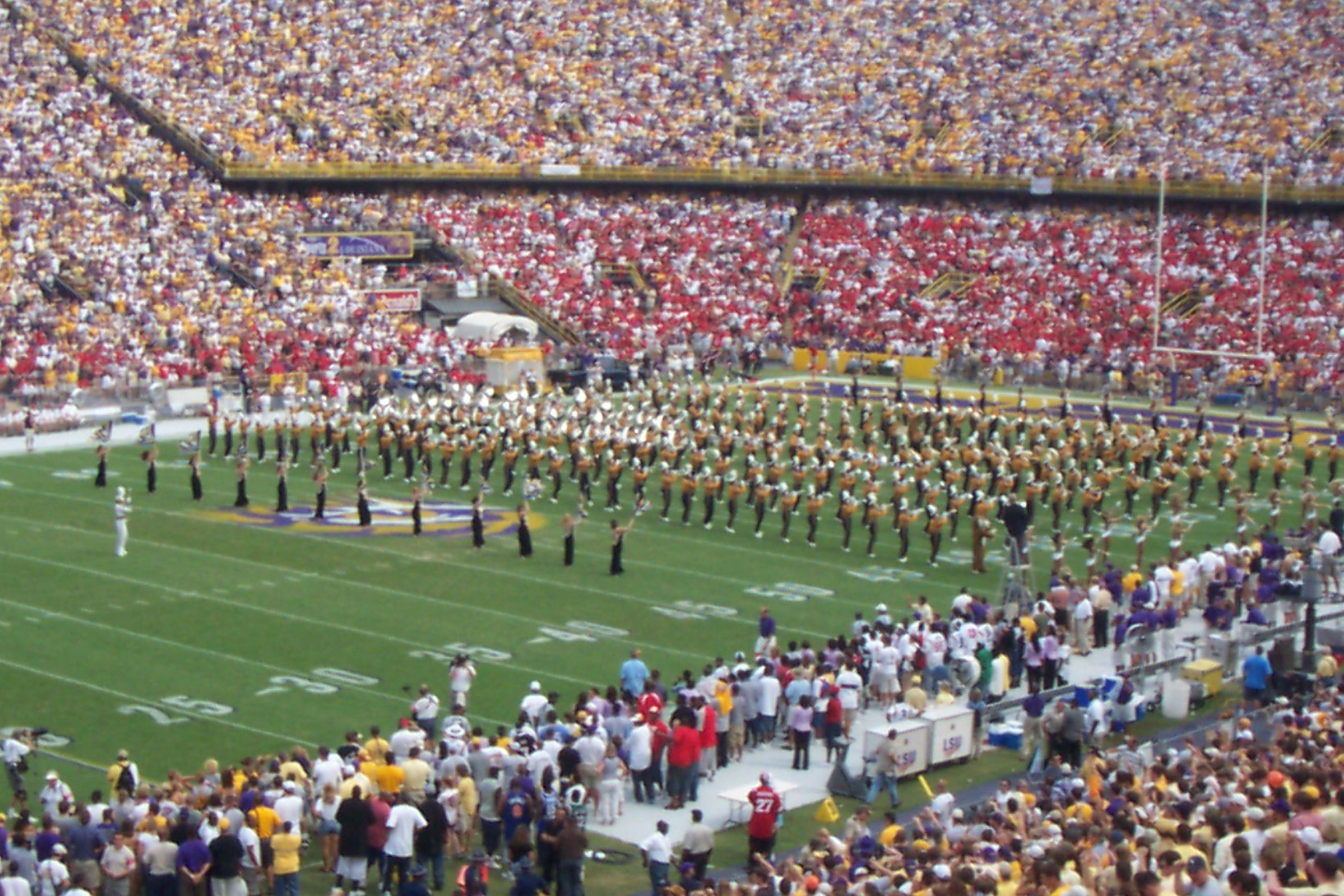
Led by the drum major, the LSU band takes the field for its pregame show.

The band begins the performance in the south end zone of the stadium and is called to attention by the drum major right before he marches out across the end zone in front of the band. Stopping at the goal line, the drum major wields his mace and uses his whistle to signal the band to take the field. The band marches out of the end zone to the beat of a single bass drum in fronts separated by five-yard intervals. The drum major halts at the 40 yard line on the far end of the field and the band is now spread across the southern half of the field with the color guard at midfield and the southern goal line. The golden girls line up next on the west sideline next to the band. The band stands at attention and awaits the percussion introduction to "Pregame Salute." As the band plays the stirring opening chords of the salute (which are taken from the tune "Tiger Rag"), the band turns to face all four corners of the stadium. The crowd explodes in cheers. Once the band salutes each part of the stadium, the pace of the music and the marching picks up, the music transitions into Long's "Touchdown for LSU," and the band sweeps the field. Toward the end of the song, the band breaks the fronts and spells out "LSU."

In the "LSU" formation, the band plays the "LSU Alma Mater" and the "Star-Spangled Banner" and is directed at the north 47 and a half yard line by the director of bands. (The band then plays "Fight for LSU" as it virtually flips the formation to spell LSU for the fans on the east side of the stadium. Upon arriving in the new formation, the band plays the second half of "Tiger Rag," which culminates in the crowd chanting "T-I-G-E-R-S, TIGERS!' in unison. This is followed the "First Down Cheer," to which the east side of the stadium in unison responds to each of the three refrains with "GEAUX! TIGERS!" and to the final refrain with "LSU!" to the sound of a fast-paced drum cadence, the band returns to the original "LSU" formation facing the west side of the stadium and replays the "First Down Cheer" as the crowd responds. The band immediately breaks into an encore performance of "Touchdown for LSU" as it reforms the original fronts, marches to the north end zone, and then breaks the fronts to form a tunnel through which the football team will enter the field.

== Bengal Brass ==
A group of 60 members selected from the ranks of the band constitute the Bengal Brass Basketball Band, often simply referred to as Bengal Brass. This group of all-brass musicians (and percussionist on a trap set) is often split into two squads—purple and gold—and performs at LSU select home volleyball matches, many home gymnastics meets, all home men's basketball, and all home women's basketball games in the Pete Maravich Assembly Center. Bengal Brass also travels with the men's and women's basketball teams during postseason play.

== Songs of LSU ==
=== LSU Alma Mater ===
The "LSU Alma Mater" was written in 1929 by Lloyd Funchess and Harris Downey, two students who developed the original song and music because LSU's first alma mater was sung to the tune of "Far Above Cayuga's Waters" and was used by Cornell University. The band plays the "Alma Mater" during pregame and at the end of each home football game.

=== "Fight for LSU" ===
"Fight for LSU" is the University's official fight song and was written by Castro Carazo in the 1940s. The band plays "Fight for LSU" often, most notably when the team enters the field (while the band is in a tunnel formation at the end of its pregame performance), successfully kicks a field goal, scores an extra point, or completes a two-point conversion. Following a halftime performance, the band often exits the field while playing "Fight for LSU."

=== "Pregame Salute"/"Touchdown for LSU" ===
"Pregame Salute"/"Touchdown for LSU" is often incorrectly considered by fans to be the school's official fight song. The opening chords and melodies of the "Pregame Salute" were derived from "Tiger Rag," a popular jazz tune from 1917, while "Touchdown for LSU," which directly follows the "Pregame Salute" both on the field and in the stands, was written in part by Huey P. Long. This song is played most notably during pregame, during the march down Victory Hill, and at the beginning of the fourth quarter of each football game.

=== "Hey, Fightin’ Tigers" ===
"Hey, Fightin’ Tigers" was adopted as a school song in the 1960s by then director of bands Thomas Tyra. Originally titled "Hey, Look Me Over" and written by Cy Coleman for the musical Wildcat, starring Lucille Ball, a version of the song with its new lyrics by Carolyn Leigh, who wrote the original lyrics of "Hey Look Me Over", after the athletic department purchased the rights to use the song. The band plays this song often in the stands and on occasion will play it to conclude a halftime performance while spelling out "LSU" or "Tigers." The song itself consists of an introduction, a repeated verse (with lyrics), a drum break during which the band and crowd both shout "T-I-G-E-R-S," and a jazz version of the original tune with various opportunities for the crowd to shout out "LSU."

=== "Tiger Rag" (Hold that Tiger) ===
"Tiger Rag" was first made popular by the Original Dixieland Jazz Band in 1917. It has been adopted by a number of schools who, like LSU, claim a tiger as a mascot. The "Hold that Tiger" portion of the song (which musically consists of one pitch played three times followed by a second pitch, up a major third, played once) is the most recognizable portion of the song for LSU fans, as it is incorporated (at different tempos) into both the "Pregame Salute" and the "First Down Cheer." Upon the scoring of a touchdown, the band plays the "Hold that Tiger" portion of the song, which concludes with a "T-I-G-E-R-S" cheer from the crowd.

=== Other pieces ===
"First, Second, and Third Down Songs"
The First, second, and third down songs are used to initiate the First, second, and third down cheers when the Tigers are on offense. The "First Down Cheer" includes the "Hold that Tiger" musical phrase from "Tiger Rag." The "Second Down Cheer" is a musical selection that is followed by the crowd chanting L-S-U! The "Third Down Cheer" is based on the song "Eye of the Tiger" made famous by Survivor.

"Tiger Bandits"
Tiger Bandits was created to pay homage to the defensive unit from the 1958 national championship football team. Coach Paul Dietzel called the unit the "Chinese Bandits." The title of the song was eventually changed to "Tiger Bandits" (or just simply "Bandits") to make the tradition more inclusive. The band plays the song when the Tiger defense forces the opposing team to punt on fourth down or forces a turnover on downs (such as intercepting a pass).

"Darling of LSU" and "The LSU Cadets March"
Darling of LSU and The LSU Cadets March were composed by Huey P. Long and band director Castro Carazo. The songs are no longer a part of the band's everyday repertoire.

"LSU Tiger Triumph March"
LSU Tiger Triumph March was written by Karl King in honor of the band and was first played in Tiger Stadium when the Tigers took on Tennessee in 1952.

== Golden Girls and Colorguard ==
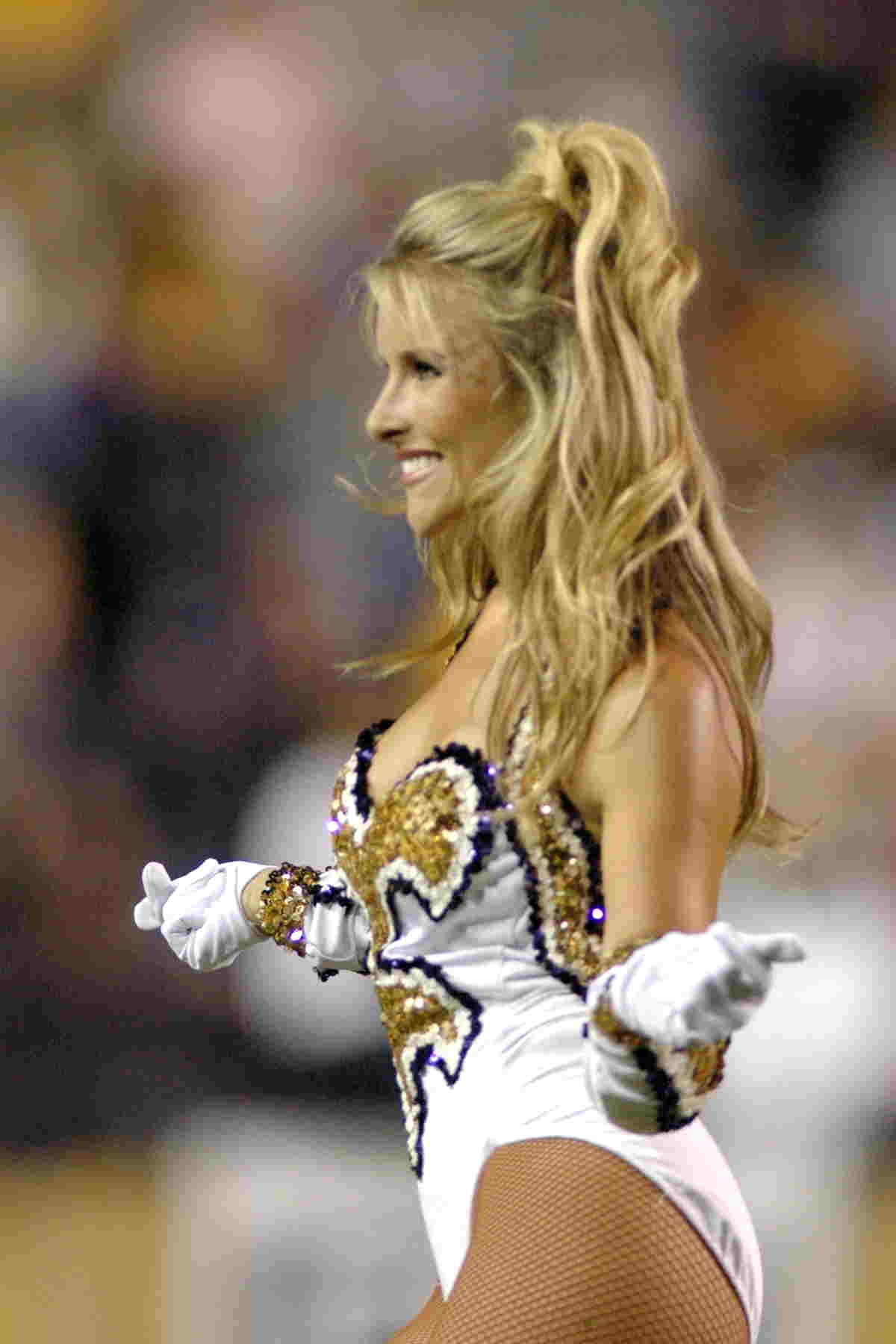
LSU Golden Girls

The LSU Golden Girls, are a feature unit with the Tiger Band and the oldest and most established danceline on the LSU campus. It was created in 1959 as the Ballet Corps by then director of bands Thomas Tyra. The Golden Girl moniker became official in 1965. Today, the line includes fourteen to eighteen dancers who audition each year to make the line and who are often members of private dance studios.

The LSU Colorguard, a flag twirling unit not to be confused with a traditional military colorguard, was established in 1971. The original colorguard consisted of twelve female members chosen from the Tiger Band's existing musicians; additionally, ten of the members each represented one of the schools in the Southeastern Conference, while the remaining two members carried white flags. Today, twenty-four to twenty- eight female twirlers are selected from an audition process. For a brief period in the 1980s, the Colorguard was co-ed.

== LSU Cheerleaders ==
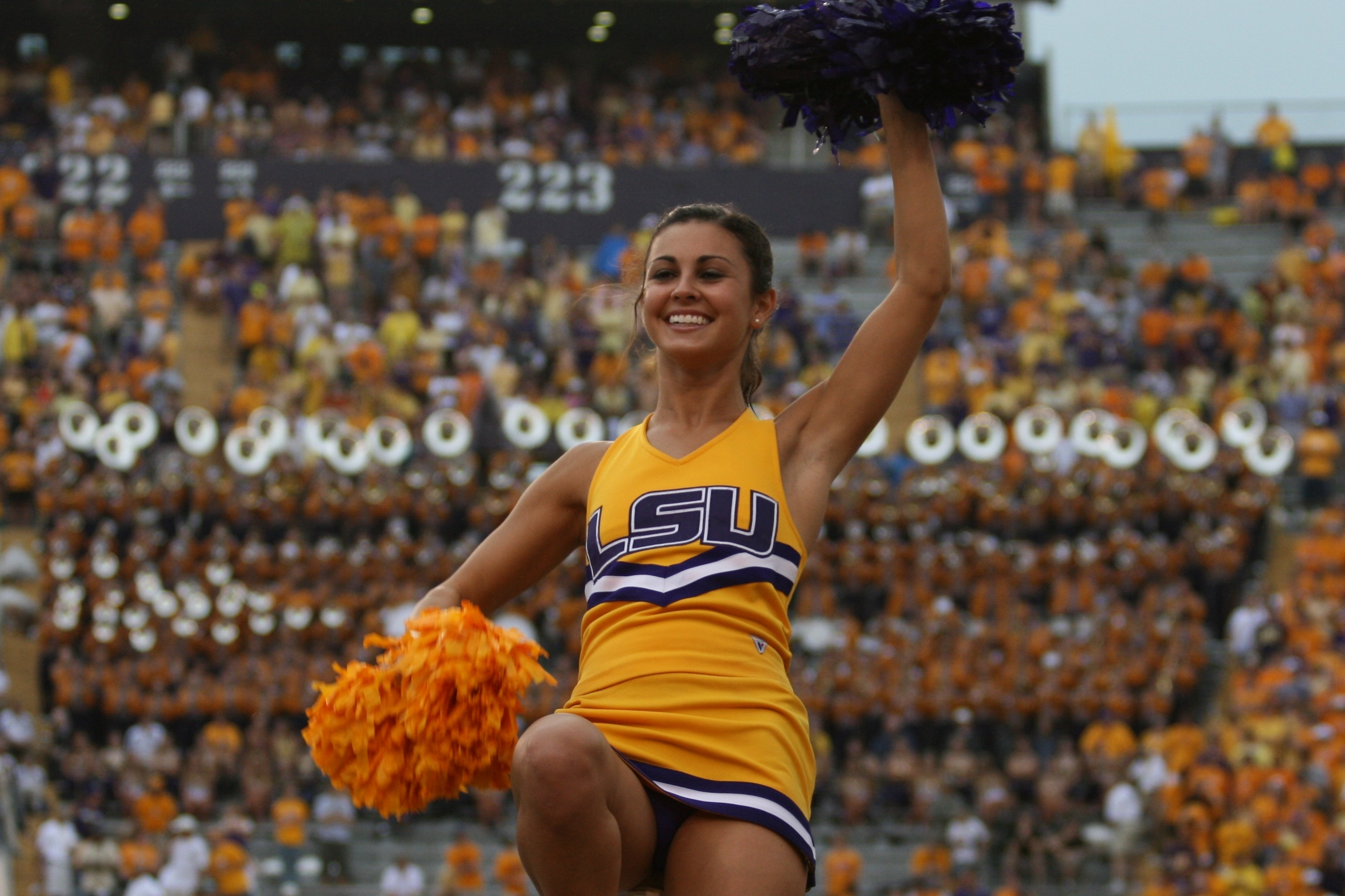
LSU cheerleaders

The LSU cheerleaders consist of both male and female cheerleaders that perform at LSU football and men's and women's basketball games. The cheerleaders lead the crowd in numerous cheers during game play and breaks. Prior to home football games, the LSU cheerleaders ride atop Mike the Tiger's mobile unit, lead the crowd in cheers such as the "Geaux Tigers" cheer and lead the football team onto the field prior to the game and after halftime. The cheerleaders are located on both sidelines during football games and are located along the baseline for home basketball games. LSU's cheerleaders also compete against other universities cheerleading squads in competitions sanctioned by the Universal Cheerleaders Association (UCA). The 1989 Tiger cheerleaders won the UCA National Championship.

== Cheers of LSU ==
=== First, Second, and Third Down Cheers ===
Used for football only, when the Tigers are on offense and earn a first down, the fans perform the "First Down Cheer". It includes the "Hold that Tiger" musical phrase from "Tiger Rag" played by the LSU band and the fans shout "Geaux Tigers" at the end of each phrase. The "Second Down Cheer" is a musical selection that is followed by the crowd chanting L-S-U! The "Third Down Cheer" is based on the song "Eye of the Tiger" made famous by Survivor.

=== Geaux Tigers ===
A common cheer for all LSU athletics, Geaux Tigers, pronounced "Go Tigers", is derived from a common ending in French Cajun names, -eaux. Acknowledging the state's French heritage, it is common for fans to issue LSU newcomers an endearing “French” name. Intended to be more humorous than grammatically correct, coaches are especially targeted. Gerry DiNardo became “Dinardeaux”, Nick Saban became “Nick C’est Bon”, and Ed Orgeron, often nicknamed "Coach O", is sometimes stylized as "Coach Eaux".

=== Geaux to Hell Ole Miss ===
When LSU is playing its rival, Ole Miss, LSU fans shout "Geaux to Hell Ole Miss. Geaux to hell" frequently, and signs with the same saying can be seen throughout the stadium. Ole Miss fans typically respond with "Go to hell, LSU!" Legend has it this was started prior to the 1959 contest when Coach Paul Dietzel, trying to motivate his troops, hired a plane to litter the LSU campus with flyers saying, "Go to Hell, LSU!" When word of this reached Oxford, Johnny Vaught, not to be outdone, responded in kind by littering the Ole Miss campus with flyers saying, "Go to Hell, Ole Miss!" Saturday night, 30 minutes prior to kickoff, Tiger Stadium was already packed with the crowd split down the middle between Tigers and Rebels. Each set of fans was shouting at the top of their lungs to the other, "Go to Hell!" The tradition has stuck ever since.

=== Hot Boudin ===
LSU's famous cheer before games and during about famous food in Louisiana. It goes "Hot boudin, cold coush-coush, come on tigers, push push push." Push is pronounced poosh to rhyme with coush-coush [koosh-koosh]. Coush-coush is a Cajun dish generally served for breakfast. Ironically, the origin of this cheer is claimed both by Tulane University and the University of Louisiana-Lafayette, which have similar versions ending with their respective team names.

=== Tiger Bait ===
LSU fans will yell "Tiger Bait, Tiger Bait" at visiting fans who wear their team colors.

== Sports ==
=== Baseball ===
==== Attendance ====
Total Attendance
As of the 2018 baseball season, LSU has finished No. 1 in the final college baseball total attendance rankings in 23 straight seasons. LSU posted a total attendance figure of 399,085 in 37 games.

In 2013, LSU posted an NCAA-record total attendance figure of 473,298 in 43 games, which was 191,458 greater than second-place team Mississippi State (281,840). LSU is also the only school in NCAA history to exceed 400,000 in total baseball attendance in a season.

Average Attendance
As of the 2018 baseball season, LSU finished No. 1 in the final average attendance rankings for the 22nd time in 23 years (Arkansas finished No. 1 in average attendance in 2007). In 2018, LSU averaged 10,786 tickets sold per game.

LSU's paid attendance figure of 12,727 for the LSU-South Carolina game on April 27, 2013 established a school record.

LSU Bat Girls
The LSU Bat Girls are a support squad that contributes to the LSU Baseball program. The Bat Girls consist of 30 individuals who work in teams of 10 at all home games, post-season games and various charity events. The squad serves as hostesses at Alex Box Stadium/Skip Bertman Field and their responsibilities include selling game day programs, recovering foul balls, retrieving bats and helmets, answering fans questions, assisting with game day promotions and giveaways and checking on umpires. They also assist the athletic department with many different aspects of the game such as attending coaches committee meetings.

Gold jerseys
LSU introduced gold jerseys for the 1996 post-season. The Tigers went on to win their 3rd National Championship that year while wearing the gold jerseys in the championship game. The jerseys became part of LSU Baseball lore when with 2 outs and a runner on third base with LSU losing 8–7 in the bottom of the 9th inning, LSU's Warren Morris swung at the first pitch and lined the ball just inches over the right field fence for a game-winning walk-off home run. This was his first home run of the season as he had missed 39 games with a broken bone in his hand. The jerseys became more ingrained in LSU lore when the Tigers also wore the gold jerseys during the 1997 post-season which resulted in another national championship, the program's 4th. After the 1996 and 1997 national championships, the baseball program reserved the gold jerseys for select games.

Under head coach Paul Mainieri, the team wears the gold jerseys regularly. The Tigers wore gold jerseys in Game 3 of the 2009 College World Series Finals against the Texas Longhorns. The Tigers defeated the Longhorns 11–4 to win the program's 6th national championship and 2nd wearing gold jerseys.

The legendary status of the gold jerseys was extended in 2023 when LSU, under 2nd year coach Jay Johnson, won the 2023 College World Series against the Florida Gators. The Tigers donned the jerseys all 3 games of the series.

=== Men's basketball ===
LSU Tiger Girls
The LSU Tiger Girls were established as a danceline for the LSU men's and women's basketball teams. The all-female squad performs during all home games and other university and non-university sponsored functions. The Tiger Girls also compete against other universities dance teams in competitions sanctioned by the Universal Dance Association (UDA).

=== Football ===
5-Yard lines
Tiger Stadium also is notable for putting all yard line numbers on the field, not just those that are multiples of 10. However, the 10-yard-line numbers are the only numbers that get directional arrows, as the rules make no provision for 5-yard-line numbers.

Callin' Baton Rouge - The Tigers play the Garth Brooks song Callin' Baton Rouge before each game.

H style goal posts
LSU's Tiger Stadium sports "H" style goal posts, as opposed to the more modern "Y" style used by most other schools today. This "H" style allows the team to run through the goal post in the north endzone when entering the field.

The crossbar from the goalposts which stood in the north end zone of Tiger Stadium from 1955 through 1984 is now mounted above the door which leads from LSU's locker room onto the playing field. The crossbar is painted with the word "WIN!", and superstition dictates every player entering the field touch the bar on his way out the door.

Jersey 18
Jersey No. 18 was an LSU tradition established in 2003 when Quarterback Matt Mauck guided LSU to the National Championship. After Mauck's final season, he passed jersey No. 18 to running back Jacob Hester who helped LSU win the 2007 National Championship. The jersey became synonymous with success on and off the field as well as having a selfless attitude. Each season, a Tiger player is voted to wear the No. 18 jersey.

Night Games in Tiger Stadium
The tradition of playing night games in Tiger Stadium began on October 3, 1931 when LSU defeated Spring Hill 35-0. Several reasons were cited for playing at night such as avoiding the heat and humidity of afternoon games, avoiding scheduling conflicts with Tulane and Loyola football and giving more fans the opportunity to see the Tigers play. Attendance increased and night football became an LSU tradition. LSU has also traditionally played better during night games based on winning percentage.

South End Zone
The south end zone in Tiger Stadium is known for its goal line stands.

The first memorable goal line stand occurred in the 1959 "Cannon's Halloween Run" game vs. Ole Miss. Billy Cannon returned a punt 89 yards for a touchdown, but it took a goal line stand with Warren Rabb and Billy Cannon stopping Ole Miss' Doug Elmore at the goal line with time expiring to seal the victory. In 1971, LSU had three goal line stands vs. Notre Dame to win 28-8. The most memorable of the three was the first with Notre Dame on the one-yard line, Ronnie Estay and Louis Cascio hit Notre Dame's Andy Huff at the goal line to prevent a touchdown. In a 1988 game vs. Texas A&M, LSU stopped the Aggies at the two-yard line despite the distraction of a bank of lights going dark midway through Texas A&M's series of plays. LSU's defense earned the nickname the "Lights Out Defense" following the stop. Other memorable goal line stands include 1985 Colorado State, 1985 Florida, 1986 North Carolina, 1986 Notre Dame, 1991 Florida State, 1992 Mississippi State and 1996 Vanderbilt.

Tiger Bandits
Whenever LSU forces a turnover or gets the ball back via a defensive stop, the LSU band plays the Tiger Bandits song and LSU fans bow in respect to the defensive stop. The original title of the song was called "Chinese Bandits", but the title was eventually changed to "Tiger Bandits" (or just simply "Bandits") to make the tradition more inclusive. The term "Chinese Bandits" originated as the nickname that LSU Coach Paul Dietzel gave to the defensive unit he organized in 1958, which helped LSU to win its first national championship. The next season, the 1959 Chinese Bandit defense held their opponents to an average of only 143.2 yards per game. No LSU defense since has done better.

Victory Gold
In 2012, a new tradition was established at Tiger Stadium. Following an LSU football victory, the lights that illuminate the upper arches on the north end of the stadium light up in LSU "Victory Gold".

Victory Hill
The LSU football players, coaches, cheerleaders and Mike the Tiger in his cage, "Walk Down Victory Hill" on North Stadium Drive prior to each home game on their way to Tiger Stadium. Thousands of fans line both sides of the road to watch and cheer the LSU Tigers football team and coaches. The practice started under former LSU head coach Gerry DiNardo.

White Jerseys - LSU is notable as one of the few college football teams that wears white jerseys for home games as opposed to their darker jerseys (in their case, purple). Most other NCAA football teams wear their darker jerseys in home games, even though football is one of the few college sports that do not require a specific jersey type for each respective team (for instance, college basketball requires home teams to wear white or light-colored jerseys while the away team wears their darker jerseys), and is similar to the NFL in letting the home team decide what to wear.

The tradition started in 1958, when Coach Paul Dietzel decided that LSU would wear white jerseys for home games. Another story is the tradition first started when Dietzel had LSU wear white at home for good luck against a ranked Georgia Tech team in 1957 because Georgia Tech's team had long been known for wearing white at home. LSU won the game and he continued that tradition for the 1958 season and LSU went on to win the national championship that year. Since the 1958 championship season, LSU continued to wear white jerseys at home games through the 18-year tenure of Charles McClendon. Then in 1983, new NCAA rules prohibited teams from wearing white jerseys at home. Because of this, LSU wore purple jerseys during home games from 1983 to 1994. The team's fans believed wearing purple jerseys were "bad luck" and often complained about being forced to wear purple jerseys at home although LSU won SEC championships in 1986 and 1988 wearing purple at home. In 1993, then-coach Curley Hallman asked the NCAA for permission to wear white jerseys at home during LSU's football centennial, but was turned down.

In 1995, LSU's new coach, Gerry DiNardo, was determined to restore LSU's tradition of white home jerseys. DiNardo personally met with each member of the NCAA Football Rules Committee, lobbying LSU's case. DiNardo was successful, and LSU again began wearing white jerseys at home when the 1995 season began. In LSU's first home game with the white jerseys, unranked LSU prevailed in a 12–6 upset victory over #6 Auburn.

The 1995 rule allowing LSU to wear white at home had one stipulation: the visiting team must agree for conference and non-conference games. In 1997, the SEC amended its rule to allow the home team its choice of jersey color for conference games without prior approval of the visiting team. Therefore, only for non-conference home games does the home team seek permission to wear white jerseys at home. In 2009, the NCAA further relaxed the previous rule that required most away teams to wear white. The rule now states that teams must simply wear contrasting colors.

After the 1995 rule change, on two occasions LSU was forced to wear colored jerseys at home. The first time was in 1996 against Vanderbilt, who was still angry at LSU for hiring Gerry DiNardo, who left Vanderbilt to become LSU's head coach after the 1994 season. LSU wore gold jerseys for that game (a 35–0 LSU victory), and fans were encouraged to wear white in an effort to "white out" the Commodores. The other was in 2004 when Oregon State did not want to suffer in its black jerseys due to the humid weather of Louisiana in late summer, thus forcing LSU to wear its purple jerseys for a nationally televised game on ESPN.

After the 1995 rule change, LSU was forced to wear colored jerseys on the road on four occasions. In 1998 and 2000, Florida coach Steve Spurrier exercised this option and forced LSU to don a colored jersey at Gainesville. The Tigers wore gold in 1998 under Gerry DiNardo (lost 22–10) and purple in 2000 under Nick Saban (lost 41–9). In 2007 and 2009, LSU also wore its purple jerseys on the road at Mississippi State, but the Tigers emerged victorious both times (45–0 in 2007 and 30–26 in 2009). Prior to the rule change, in 1978 LSU lost to Mississippi State in Jackson, Mississippi wearing purple jerseys.

Currently, LSU does not wear the traditional white jerseys for every home game. LSU only wears white jerseys for the home opener and for home games against SEC opponents. For non-SEC home games other than the home opener, LSU wears purple jerseys at home.

== Tailgating ==
LSU fans tailgate for football, men's basketball and baseball. For home football games, LSU fans from every corner of the region, well over ninety thousand, descend on the Baton Rouge campus; setting up motor homes and tents for one of Louisiana's biggest parties as early as Thursday before Saturday football games. During men's basketball season, you can find RVs tailgating the day before a weekend game and during baseball season some fans will tailgate for the entire three days of a weekend series. Tailgating is found across the entire campus with many fans tailgating in the same spot year after year. Some tailgaters form affiliations or organizations and name their "tailgating krewes".

LSU has continually been ranked as the top tailgating location in the country. ESPN.com ranked LSU as the top tailgating destination in America. The Sporting News proclaimed "Saturday Night in Death Valley" and Tiger tailgating as the top tradition in college football. Sports Illustrated said, "When It Comes To Great Tailgating, Nothing Compares To LSU." LSU's tailgating was named No. 1 in an Associated Press poll on top tailgating spots and by a CNN network survey on top tailgating locations.

Visiting team supporters can be heckled and chants of "Tiger Bait! Tiger Bait!" are sometimes directed at opposing teams' fans. During men's basketball season, RV's can be found tailgating the day before a weekend game and during baseball season some fans will tailgate for the entire three days of a weekend series.

== Student life ==
=== Free Speech Alley ===
The LSU Student Union opened January 6, 1964. It was in an alley between the Union bookstore and the theatre, that students spoke their minds. In the early years, Free Speech Alley was under the supervision of the Union's Current Events Committee and was, at that time, only open to students, faculty and staff. Over time, those not affiliated with the university were also allowed to voice their opinion.

It has been the site of protests and discussions about free speech, global concerns, U.S. government domestic and foreign policy, Louisiana legislative bills, LSU policies, elections, impeachment, flag burning, environmental concerns and religion. In addition, it is also the site of student clubs and organizations booths, political campaigning, art sales and blood drives. It was even the site of a "faux" car crash to promote the dangers of drinking and driving.

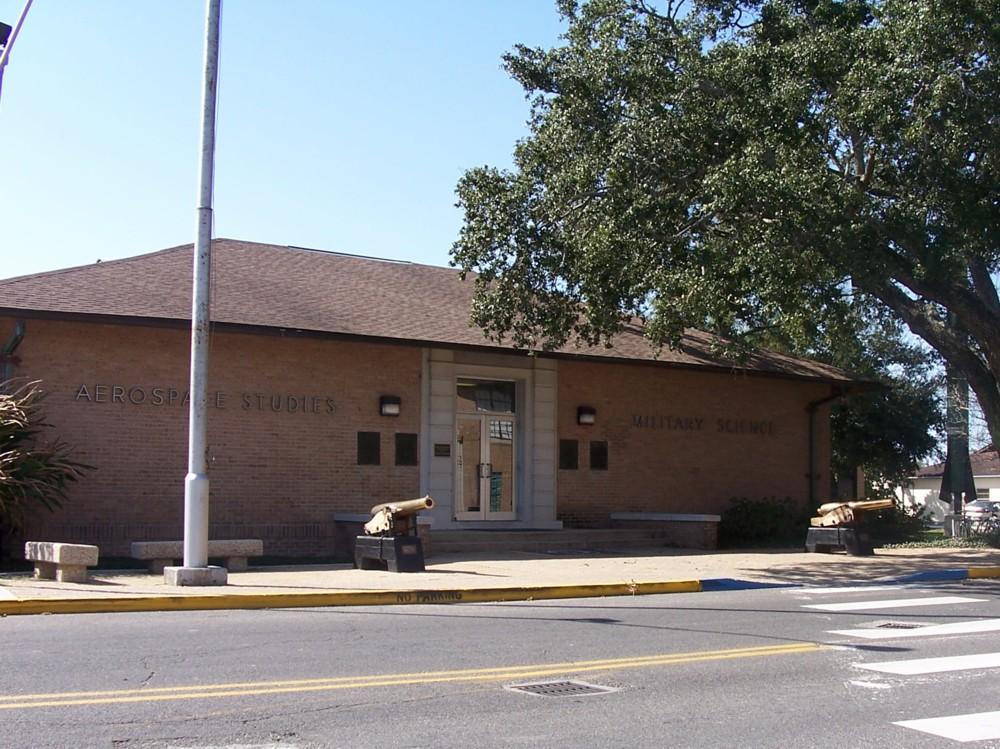
Cannons donated by Gen. Sherman from the Civil War in front of LSU's Military Science/Aerospace Studies Building

The university, as a state-funded institution, allows both sides to display their opinions in order to respect the First Amendment.

=== Old War Skule ===
In 1853, the Louisiana General Assembly established the Louisiana State Seminary of Learning & Military Academy. The institution opened on January 2, 1860, with future Civil War General William Tecumseh Sherman as superintendent. It was founded as a military academy and throughout its history, military training has been part of student life with many students participating in Reserve Officers' Training Corps (ROTC). One unique feature on campus are two cannons displayed in front of LSU's Military Science/Aerospace Studies Building. The cannons were donated by General Sherman following the surrender of the Confederates at Appomattox Court House on April 9, 1865. The cannons had been captured from Confederate forces after the close of the war and had been used during the initial firing upon Fort Sumter in April 1861. With a long history steeped in military tradition, it became popular to refer to Louisiana State University as the "Ole War Skule". The nickname "Old Lou" had occasionally been used when referring to the university, but it was not officially used by the university in any capacity.

== See also ==
- LSU Tigers and Lady Tigers
- Louisiana State University
