= Arseneault =

Arseneault is a French surname. Notable people with the surname include:

- David Arseneault (born 1953), college basketball coach
- David Arseneault Jr. (born 1986), Canadian professional and college basketball coach, former player
- Donald Arseneault, Canadian politician
- Guy Arseneault (born 1952), Canadian politician
- Louise Arseneault, psychology professor at King's College London
- Raynald Arseneault (1945–1995), Canadian composer and organist

== See also ==
- Arsenault
- Arseneau
- Arceneaux
