= Arseneau =

Arseneau is a French surname. Notable people with the surname include:

- Joseph Brant Arseneau (born 1967), inventor
- Maxime Arseneau (born 1949), Canadian radio host, educator and politician

== See also ==
- Arseneault
- Arsenault
- Arceneaux
