= Fight for LSU =

Fight song at Louisiana State University

"Fight for LSU" is the official fight song of the LSU Tigers and Lady Tigers intercollegiate sports teams of Louisiana State University in Baton Rouge, Louisiana.

== History of the lyrics and score ==
"Fight for LSU" was written by Castro Carazo in the 1940s. The band plays the song often, most notably when the team enters the field (while the band is in a tunnel formation at the end of its pregame performance), successfully kicks a field goal, scores an extra point, or completes a two-point conversion. Following a halftime performance, the band often exits the field while playing "Fight for LSU." The full song uses elements of a musical march and consists of an introduction, a strain that is played twice (and sung twice using the same lyrics), a breakup strain (with new lyrics), a return to the introduction, a final repetition of the original strain (at a faster tempo and with the original lyrics), and a coda. Often the band only plays the introduction, a single strain, and the coda.

== See also ==
- Louisiana State University traditions
- Louisiana State University Tiger Marching Band
