= Robicheau =

Robicheau is a surname. Notable people with the surname include:

- Henri M. Robicheau (September 12, 1838 – May 4, 1923) was a farmer and political figure in Nova Scotia
- Mathurin Robicheau (? – circa 1878) was a farmer and political figure in Nova Scotia Clare
- Frederick Armand Robicheau (1785 – April 18, 1863) was a political figure in Nova Scotia
- Jean-Louis Philippe Robicheau (June 30, 1874 – March 1, 1948) was a farmer, lumber merchant and political figure in Nova Scotia

== See also ==
- Robichaud
- Robichaux
- Robicheaux
