= Robichaud =

Surname

Robichaud is a French surname. Notable people with the surname include:

- Adrian Robichaud, heavy metal bass guitarist from Toronto, Ontario, Canada
- Albany Robichaud (1903–1974), Progressive Conservative party member of the Canadian House of Commons
- Audrey Robichaud (born 1988), Canadian athlete
- Carmel Robichaud, politician and retired teacher in New Brunswick, Canada
- Edith Hacon or Robichaud (1875–1952) married Canadian soldier (William), Scottish suffragist from Dornoch, a World War One nursing volunteer, as well as an international socialite
- Elvy Robichaud (born 1951), former Canadian politician
- Fernand Robichaud, PC (born 1939), Canadian politician
- Gary Robichaud (1962–2005), Canadian teacher and politician
- Hédard Robichaud, PC, OC (1911–1999), Acadian-Canadian MP, Cabinet member, Senator and Lieutenant Governor of New Brunswick
- Jean George Robichaud (1883–1969), fish merchant and political figure in New Brunswick
- Jocelyn Robichaud (born 1978), former tour professional tennis player
- Louis Robichaud, PC, CC, QC (1925–2005), Canadian lawyer and politician
- Louis-Prudent-Alexandre Robichaud (1890–1971), New Brunswick political figure and jurist
- Luc Robichaud, Canadian politician
- Paul Robichaud (born 1964), politician in the province of New Brunswick, Canada
- Serge Robichaud, Canadian politician
- Vénérande Robichaud (1753–1839), Canadian businesswoman

== See also ==
- Robichaud v. Canada (Treasury Board)
- Robichaux
- Robicheau
- Robicheaux
