= Robichaux =

Robichaux is a surname. Notable people with the surname include:

- Cynthia Robichaux Chenault (born 1937, stagename: Cindy Robbins), U.S. actress
- Dilana Robichaux (born 1972), South African singer-songwriter
- Joe Robichaux (1900–1965), American jazz artist; nephew of John
- John Robichaux (1866–1939), American jazz artist; uncle of Joe
- Mary Robichaux, U.S. politician
- Tony Robichaux (1961–2019), American college baseball coach

== See also ==
- Robichaux House, a historic house in Thibodaux, Louisiana
- Robichaud
- Robicheau
- Robicheaux
