= Robicheaux =

Robicheaux is a surname of Cajun French (French: français cadien) derivation.

== People ==
- Coco Robicheaux (1947–2011), U.S. blues musician
- Ron Robicheaux, a U.S. baseball player from the Louisiana Ragin' Cajuns drafted by the Pittsburgh Pirates in 1986

== Fictional characters ==
- Dave Robicheaux, a fictional character created by James Lee Burke
- Goodnight "Goody" Robicheaux, a fictional character from the 2016 film The Magnificent Seven
- John Robichaux, a fictional character from the TV soap opera Days of Our Lives
- Melinda Robicheaux, a fictional character from the 2004 film Melinda and Melinda
- Miss Robicheaux, founder of “Miss Robichaux's Academy for Exceptional Young Ladies” from the TV show American Horror Story
- Regina Robichaux,Guiding Light

== See also ==
- Robicheaux v. Caldwell, a same-sex marriage case in Louisiana
- Robicheaux v. George, a same-sex marriage case in Louisiana
- Miss Robicheaux's Academy, a fictional location in the 2018 U.S. TV show American Horror Story: Apocalypse; see List of American Horror Story: Apocalypse characters
- -eaux
- Robichaud
- Robichaux
- Robicheau
