= Arceneaux =

Arceneaux is a French surname. Notable people with the surname include:

- Edgar Arceneaux (born 1972), American artist
- Emmanuel Arceneaux (born 1987), American professional football wide receiver
- Fernest Arceneaux (1940–2008), American Zydeco musician
- George Arceneaux (1928–1993), United States federal judge
- Harold Arceneaux (born 1977), American professional basketball player
- Hayley Arceneaux (born 1991), American private astronaut
- Stacey Arceneaux (1936–2015), retired American basketball player
- Scott Arceneaux Jr. (born 1989), American rapper and producer known for being in the New Orleans duo Suicideboys
- Tom Arceneaux, American politician

== See also ==
- -eaux
- Arsenault
- Arseneault
- Arseneau
