= Renewable Energy Derivative =

A renewable energy derivative is based on a new method of securitization, which is a structured finance process that pools and repackages cash-flow-producing financial assets into securities which are then sold to investors. The term "securitization" is derived from the fact that securities are used to obtain funds from investors.

== Summary ==
Cash-flow-producing financial assets were traditionally mortgages, credit cards, and then student loans. More recently the assets have become more exotic, like annual airline flight tax, intellectual property such as Bowie Bonds, and life insurance premiums for captive orcas. In essence any asset's cash flow can be securitized if the historical, realized cash flow demonstrates a statistical predictability. This process was first applied to renewable energy by Joseph Brant Arseneau and his team at IBM.

A renewable energy derivative is just that: a cash flow that has been proven historically and demonstrates a statistical predictability. The predictability of the cash flow is achieved by consulting with professionals to ensure that the primary asset, in this case a private home, is equipped with the optimal types of renewable energy sources for its immediate environment. These energy sources are chosen with respect to the location of the home, the weather, and supporting data, including historical wind patterns, heat changes, and earth core temperatures.

If the assets produce more power than is required by the home, the excess power is sold to a Special Purpose Vehicle (SPV), which pools all of the surrounding assets, conducts credit enhancements, and may buy weather derivatives to offset some local weather risk. The accumulation of these cash forms are considered to be the earnings of the SPV. The SPV is a company that owns the cash flow and is capitalized in a structure that provides several different types (tranches) of debt and a few layers of equity. These capital structures are then sold to the capital markets as securities.

== Structure ==
=== Pooling and transfer ===
The originator is the initial owner of the assets engaged in the deal. This is typically a company looking to raise capital, restructure debt, or otherwise adjust its finances. Under traditional corporate finance concepts, such a company would have three options to raise new capital: a loan, a bond issue, or the issuance of stock. However, stock offerings dilute the ownership and control of the company, while loan or bond financing is often prohibitively expensive due to the company's credit rating and the associated rise in interest rates.

=== Issuance ===
To be able to buy the assets from the originator, the issuer SPV issues tradable securities to fund the purchase. Investors purchase the securities, either through a private offering targeting institutional investors or on the open market. The performance of the securities is then directly linked to the performance of the assets. Credit rating agencies rate the securities to provide an external perspective on the liabilities being created and help investors make better-informed decisions.

=== Credit enhancement and tranching ===
Unlike conventional unsecured corporate bonds, securities generated in a securitization deal are credit enhanced, meaning their credit quality is increased above that of the originators' unsecured debts or underlying asset pools. This increases the likelihood that the investors will receive cash flows to which they are entitled, causing the securities to have higher credit ratings than the originators. Some securitizations use external credit enhancement provided by third parties, such as surety bonds and parental guarantees, although this may introduce a conflict of interest.

=== Servicing ===
A servicer collects payments and monitors the assets at the crux of the structured financial deal. The servicer can often be the originator because the servicer needs very similar expertise to the originator and would want to ensure that loan repayments are paid to the Special Purpose Vehicle.

The servicer can significantly affect the cash flows to investors because it controls the collection policy, which influences the proceeds collected, the charge-offs, and the recoveries on the loans. Any income remaining after payments and expenses is usually accumulated to some extent in a reserve or spread account, and any further excess is returned to the seller. Bond rating agencies publish ratings of asset-backed securities based on the performance of the collateral pool, the credit enhancements, and the probability of default.

=== Repayment structures ===
Unlike corporate bonds, most securitizations are amortized, meaning that the principal amount borrowed is paid back gradually over the specified term of the loan rather than in one lump sum at the maturity of the loan. Fully amortizing securitizations are generally collateralized by fully amortizing assets such as home equity loans, auto loans, and student loans. Prepayment uncertainty is an important concern with fully amortizing ABS. The possible rate of prepayment varies widely with the type of underlying asset pool, so many prepayment models have been developed in an attempt to define common prepayment activity. The PSA prepayment model is a well-known example.

=== Structural risks and misincentives ===
Originators have less incentive toward credit quality and greater incentive toward loan volume since they do not bear the long-term risk of the assets they have created and may simply profit by the fees associated with origination and securitization.

== See also ==
- renewable energy
- project finance
