= Eastern Michigan University Marching Band =

College marching band in Ypsilanti, Michigan

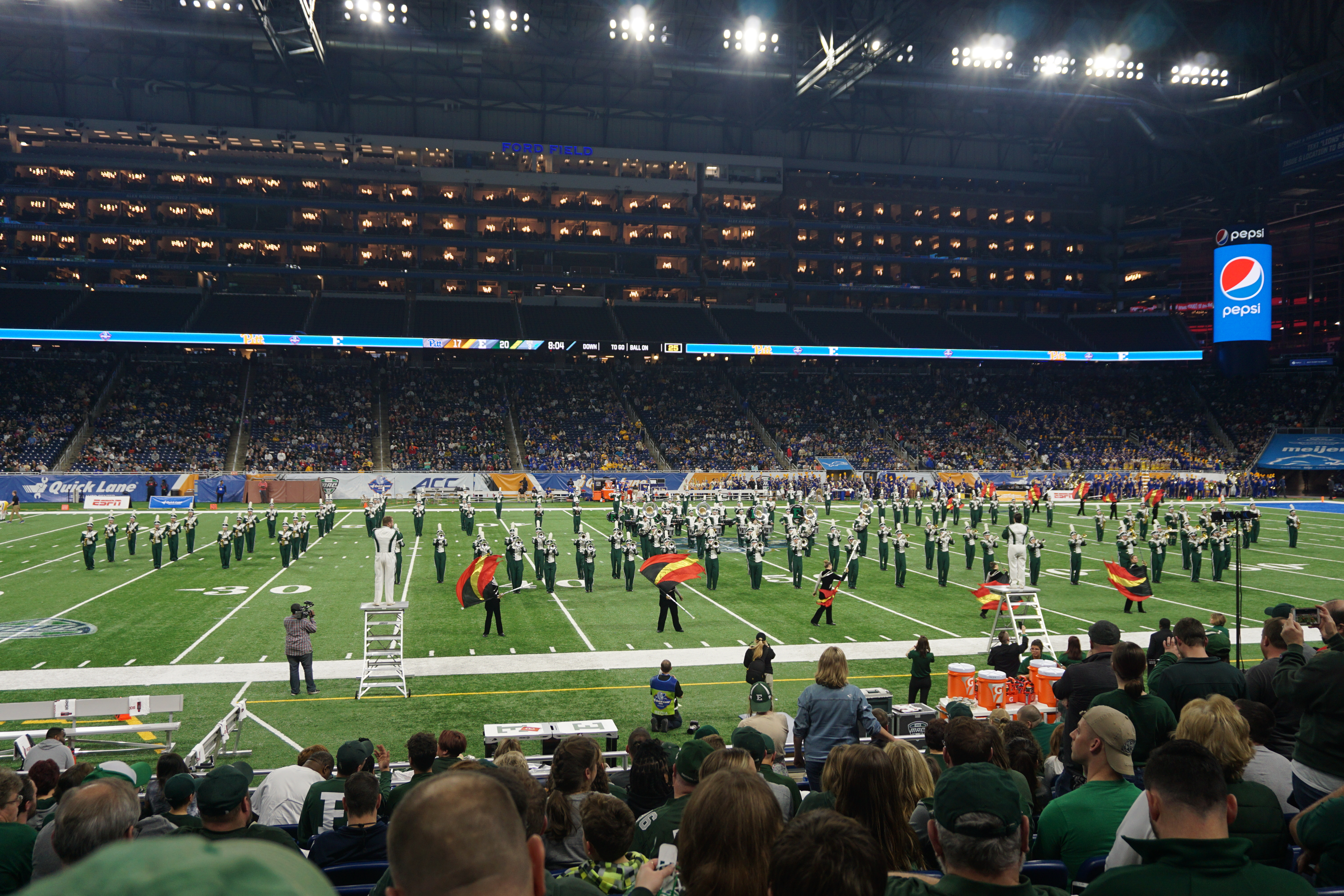
- The Eastern Michigan University Marching Band performing at the 2019 Quick Lane Bowl
- Nickname: The Pride of the Peninsula
- School: Eastern Michigan University
- Location: Ypsilanti, MI
- Conference: Mid-American Conference
- Founded: 1894
- Director: J. Nick Smith
- Members: 192
- Fight song: "Eagles Fight Song"
- Website: www.emumb.org

The Eastern Michigan University Marching Band (The Pride of the Peninsula) serves as Eastern Michigan University's marching band.

== History ==
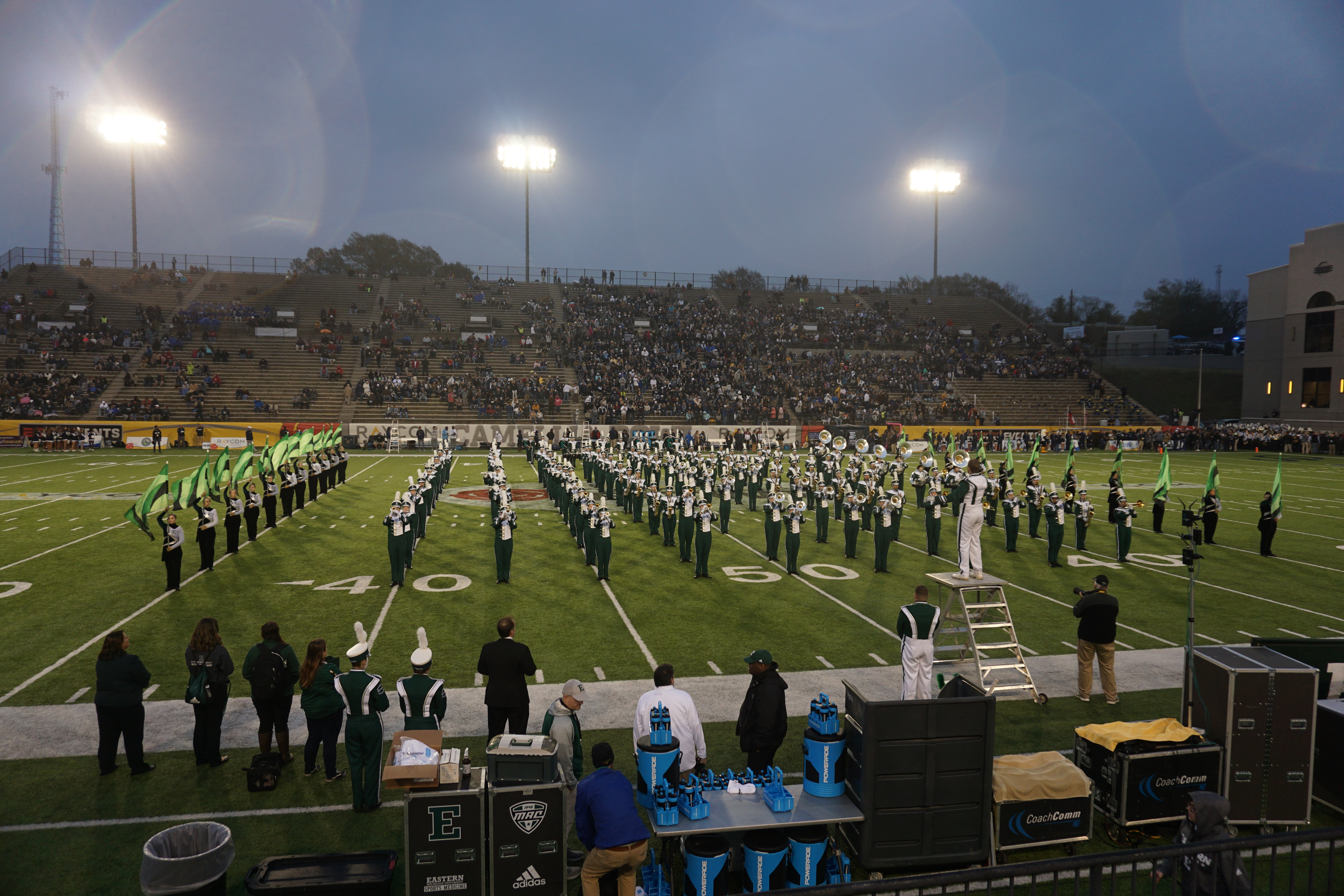
The Eastern Michigan University Marching Band performing at the 2018 Camellia Bowl

The band was first formed in 1894, however the marching band was only a student-funded extra-curricular activity that performed in parades, concerts, and athletic events, it wasn't until 1924 that the band was officially recognized as an ensemble within the Normal Conservatory of Music due to the efforts of Normal Mathematics Professor J.F. Barnhill. Professor Barnhill brought Captain Wilfred Wilson, conductor of the Michigan Band, to the Ypsilanti campus as the first Director of the marching band. The first recorded mention of the “Huron Band” was on October 31, 1925, when 48 uniformed bandsmen paraded the streets of Ypsilanti and later played at the Normal-Kalamazoo College football game. In 1964, Thomas Tyra was appointed director of bands at the university and in 1968, Max Plank joined the EMU Bands program as Tyra's assistant. Together they forged a lifelong collaboration and friendship that would result in significant growth of the EMU Bands program and its traditions. Tyra arranged the "Eagles Fight Song" for marching band, composed the team cheer "Go Green," and the "EMU Fanfare," all pregame traditionals that are played today.

== Organization ==
=== Director ===
Dr. J. Nick Smith serves as the current director of the Eastern Michigan Marching Band, who completed his Doctor of Musical Arts degree in Wind Band Conducting with emphasis in Choral Conducting at the University of Minnesota.

Past Directors of the Eastern Michigan Marching Band:

- Chandler L. Wilson (2019-2020)
- Derek Shapiro (2017–2019)
- Amy Knopps (2010–16)
- John Zastoupil (2007–09)
- Scott Boerma (2002–06)
- David Woike (1990-2001)
- Max Plank (1979–1989)
- Thomas Tyra (1964–77)
- Mitch Osadchuk (1956–64)

=== Instructional Staff ===
- Drumline Instructor: Jason Ihnat
- Color Guard Instructor: Chelsea Lee
- Announcer: Eric Braun

=== Graduate Assistants ===
Two graduate assistants are assigned to work with the EMUMB; one specializing in brass, and the other in woodwind instruments. The graduate assistants lead large sectionals and conduct the band when needed. At times they assist the band staff in preparing for events such as Band Day, Picnic Day, etc.

=== Drum Majors ===
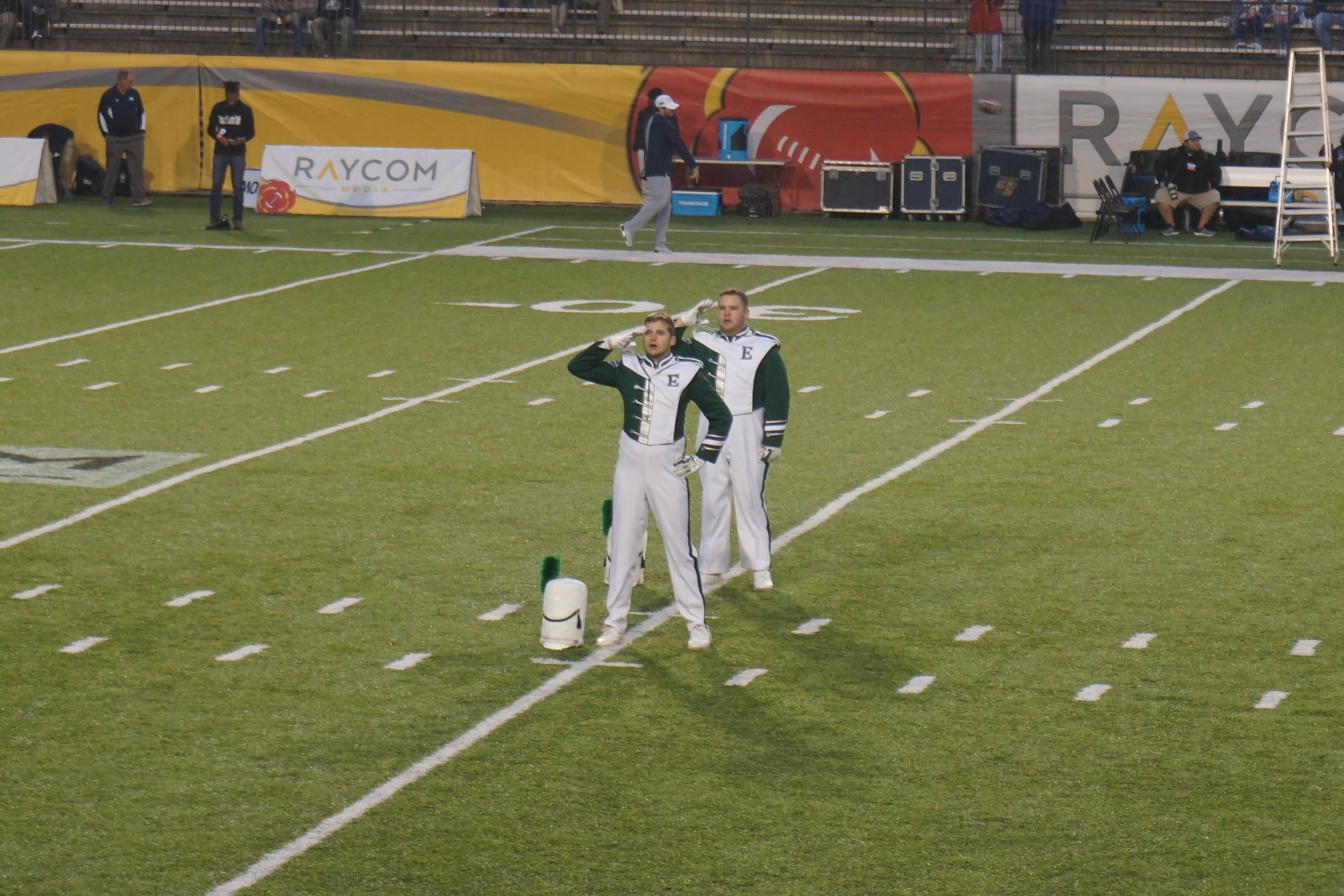
Eastern Michigan University Marching Band drum majors

The Eastern Michigan Marching Band typically has 2-3 drum majors. The drum majors main responsibilities are teaching marching fundamentals at band camp, leading warm-ups and stretches, heading the leadership team, and conducting the band on the field and in the stands.

=== Leadership Team ===
The leadership team consists of the section leaders. Each section has at least one section leader who oversees the marching technique and musical aspect of their section. They often hold sectionals outside of rehearsals and make sure their section is prepared for all events.

== Traditions ==
=== Pregame ===
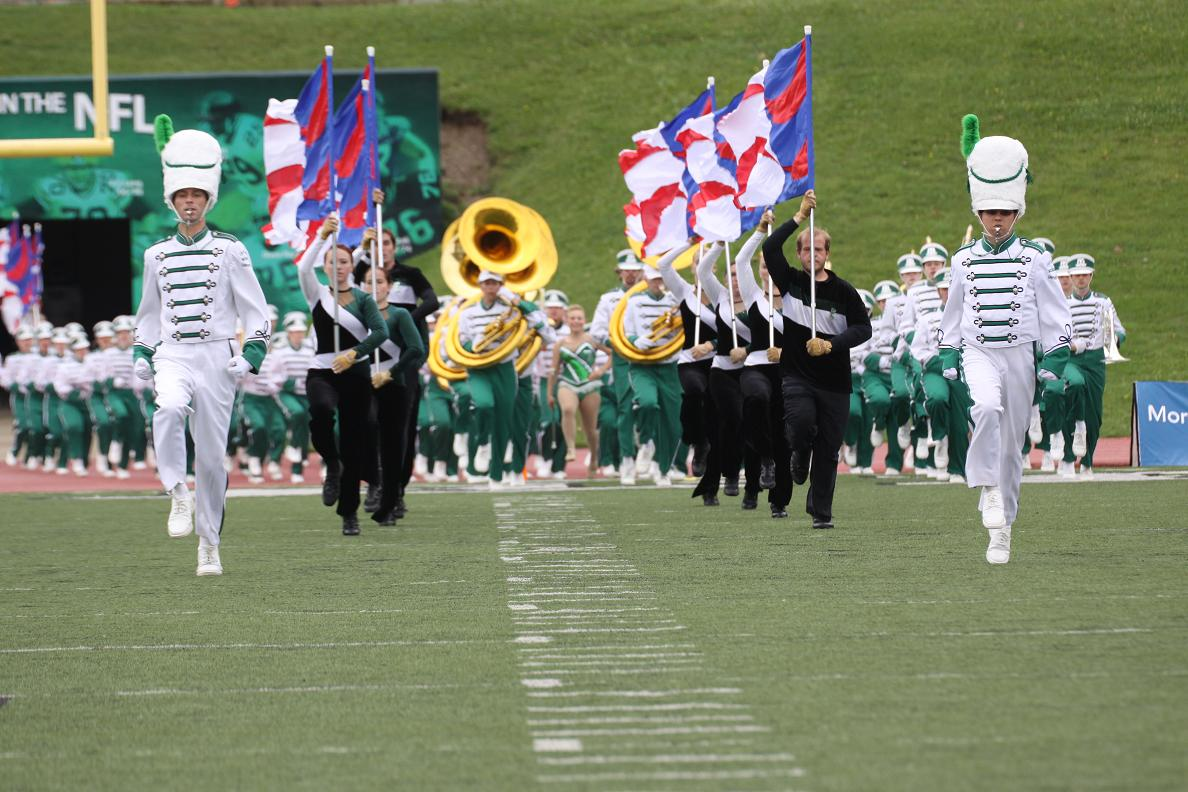
Pregame Entrance

At approximately quarter till kickoff, the band pours out of the tunnel to drum cadences. At the conclusion of the cadence the band plays the "EMU Fanfare" while announcer, Eric Braun introduces the director, twirler(s) and drum major(s). The band then plays the "Eagles Fight Song", and other traditional pregame elements such as "Go Green" and the Star Spangled Banner. A notable pregame feature is the "Floating E" down the field.

=== "Eagles Fight Song" ===
The "Eagles Fight Song" melody was composed by Larry Livingston in 1939 and arranged for marching band by Thomas Tyra. The percussion parts were written by Whitney Prince. The fight song underwent minor lyric changes when the university transitioned from the Hurons to the Eagles in 1991.

=== "Our Pledge" ===
The Eastern Michigan University Alma Mater, "Our Pledge" was written by Edward Bowles in 1939 and arranged for marching band by Tyra. After each game and rehearsal, the band sings an SATB arrangement by Max Plank of the alma mater while linking arms.

=== Special Performances ===
Contingent upon the season schedule, the band will travel to away games and participate in other special performances. In recent years, The EMUMB has traveled with the football team to The University of Michigan, Michigan State University, Penn State University, and Ford Field in Detroit. The EMU Marching Band has also performed at venues such as the Pontiac Silverdome and Ralph Wilson Stadium near Buffalo, NY. In 2008, The EMUMB performed in America's Thanksgiving Day Parade in Detroit, MI. In 2013, the marching band was featured on the nationally syndicated children's show, "Ariel, Zoey, & Eli, Too," on Detroit Public Television (WTVS). The episode features the EMUMB performing the television's theme song, "Sweet Company," filmed in the university's Rynearson Stadium.
