= Arsenault =

Arsenault is a French surname. Notable people with the surname include:

- Adrien Arsenault (1889–1941), Canadian politician
- Adrienne Arsenault (born 1967), Canadian journalist
- Angela Arsenault, American politician
- Angèle Arsenault (1943–2014), Canadian-Acadian musician
- Aubin-Edmond Arsenault (1870–1968), Canadian politician
- Bona Arsenault (1903–1993), Canadian politician
- Damien Arsenault (born 1960), Canadian politician
- Daniel Arsenault, American photographer
- Duncan Arsenault (born 1974), American musician
- Frank Arsenault (1919–1974), American percussionist
- Gilles Arsenault, Canadian politician
- Isabelle Arsenault (born 1978), Canadian illustrator
- Jean-François Arsenault, Canadian politician in Quebec
- Jean-Michel Arsenault (born 1988), Canadian curler
- Joseph F. H. Arsenault (1866–1946), Canadian politician
- Joseph-Félix Arsenault (1865–1947), Canadian politician
- Joseph-Octave Arsenault (1828–1897), Canadian politician
- Len J. Arsenault (1934–1999), Canadian politician
- Lise Arsenault (born 1954), Canadian gymnast
- Marie-Louise Arsenault, Canadian radio personality
- Mary-Anne Arsenault (born 1968), Canadian curler
- Nina Arsenault (born 1974), Canadian transgender writer
- Nérée Arsenault (1911–1982), Canadian politician
- Pierre Arsenault (born 1963), American baseball coach
- Prosper Arsenault (1894–1987), Canadian politician
- Raymond Arsenault (born 1948), American historian
- Samantha Arsenault (born 1981), American swimmer
- Steve Arsenault (born 1988), Canadian ice sledge hockey player
- Télesphore Arsenault (1872–1964), Canadian politician
- Wilfred Arsenault (1953–2011), Canadian politician

== See also ==
- Arseneault
- Arseneau
- Arceneaux
