= Louisiana State University Tiger Marching Band =

Marching band of Louisiana State University

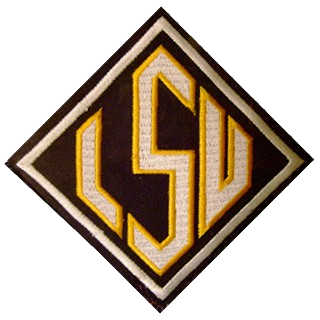
- School: Louisiana State University
- Location: Baton Rouge, Louisiana
- Conference: SEC
- Founded: 1893; 133 years ago
- Director: Damon Talley
- Associate Directors: Simon Holoweiko, Weston Lewis
- Assistant Directors: Rob Dowie
- Members: 325
- Fight song: "Fight for LSU"
- Website: www.lsu.edu/cmda/bands

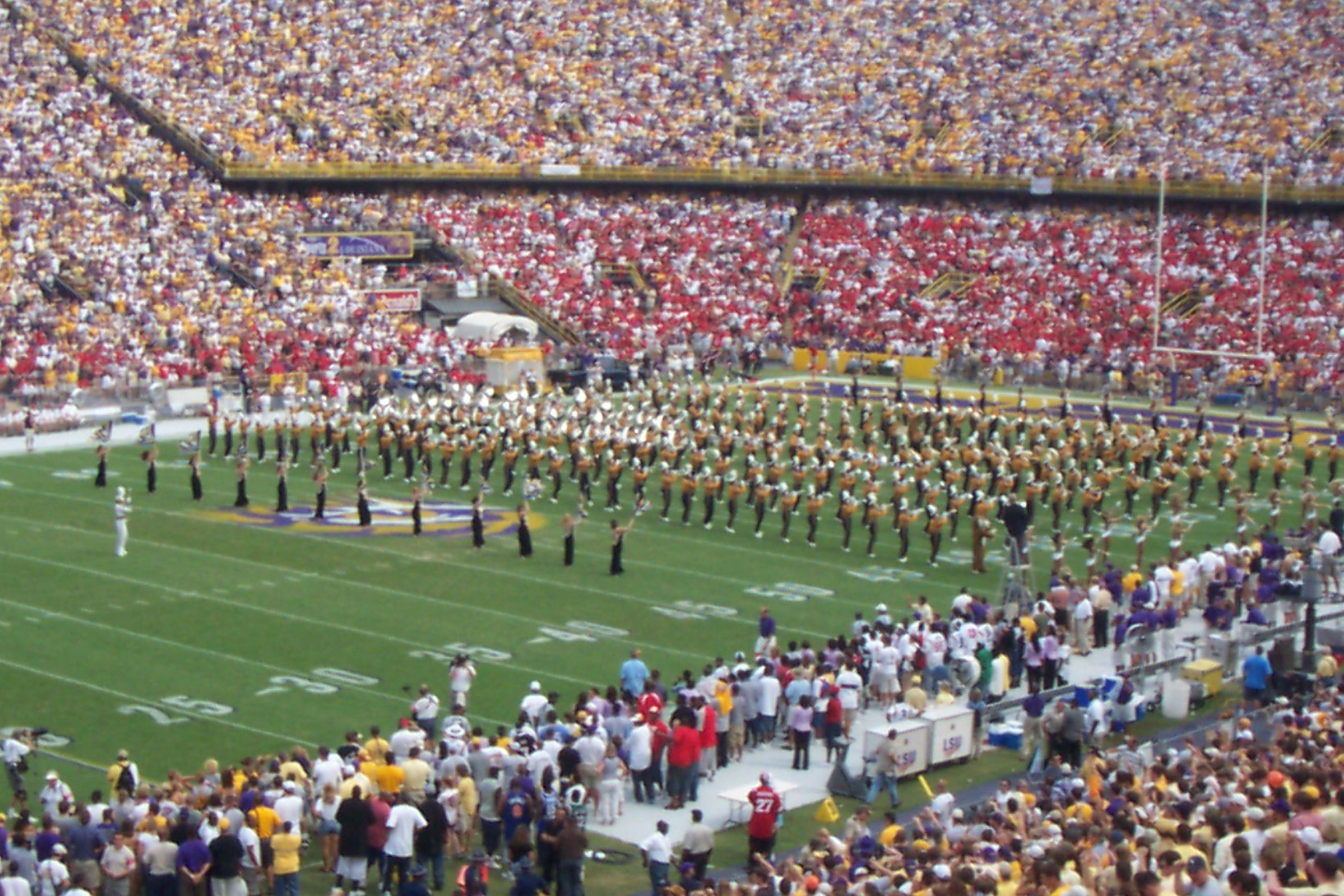
Led by the drum major, the band takes the field for its traditional pregame performance.

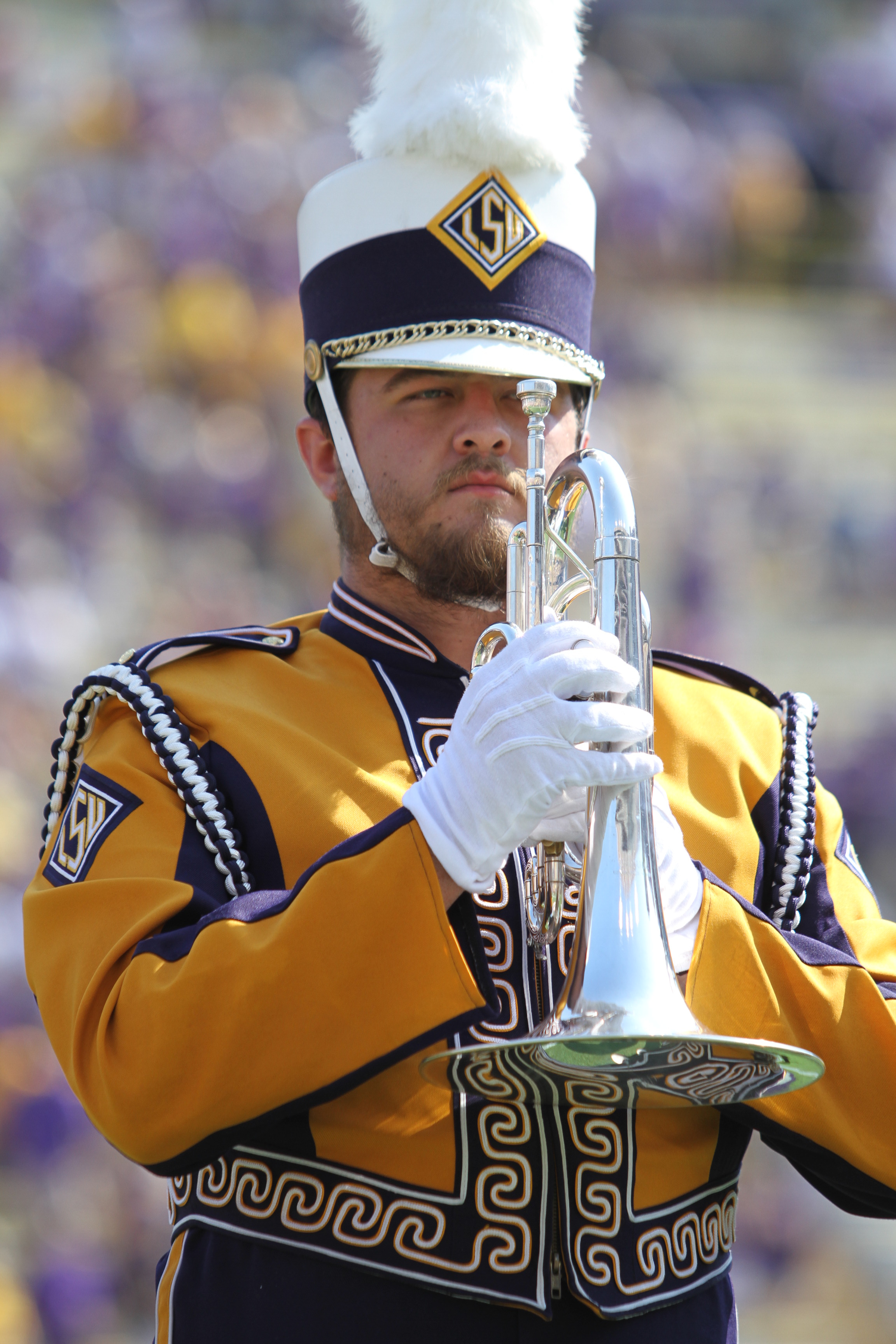
LSU Marching Band, The Golden Band From Tiger Land. October 5, 2019

The Louisiana State University Tiger Marching Band (also called the Golden Band from Tigerland or simply the Tiger Band) is the official marching band of Louisiana State University (LSU). The full band has 325 members, and performs at all LSU football home games, all bowl games made by the team, and one away game per year. The 100-110-member pep band, which makes up a portion of the marching band, performs at all away games except for the one where the full band performs.

== History ==
=== Cadet band ===
The LSU Tiger Band began as a military band in 1893, organized by two students: Wylie M. Barrow and Ruffin G. Pleasant. Pleasant, who later became governor of the state of Louisiana, served as director of the eleven-piece cadet band. Pleasant also played as the quarterback of the football team and, alongside football coach Charles E. Coates, changed LSU's official school colors from blue and white to purple and gold. The band averaged thirteen members in its early years.

In his written history of the band, former director of bands Frank Wickes describes the band's formative years:

By the turn of the century, the Cadet Band also became a marching unit. Tours of the state and appearances at Mardi Gras festivities in New Orleans became early traditions. In 1904, the band joined four companies of cadets from LSU for a performance at the St. Louis World Exposition.

The band performed mainly military duties and later developed into focusing on athletic events. The band marched in its first halftime show in 1924.

=== Kingfish years ===
The band experienced growth when Louisiana Governor Huey P. Long took an interest in increasing LSU's national prominence. In an oral history about the governor, Mary Hebert addressed Huey Long's preoccupation with the band, and improving the university became one of his pet projects. Long was at first not attracted by the academics of the school but by their band. Due to this, the governor demanded that the band be enlarged from twenty-eight pieces to one hundred twenty-five pieces. This would make the band one of the largest in the country.

Long picked the university's president, James Monroe Smith, and hired a new band director, Castro Carazo, the orchestra leader at the Roosevelt Hotel in New Orleans. Long also changed the band's military dress to a different uniform. Several songs were co-written for the band by Long and Carazo, including "Touchdown for LSU," "Darling of LSU," and "The LSU Cadets March." "Touchdown for LSU" is still played as part of the band's pregame performance. Long often lowered train ticket prices so the band and students could travel to away football games. During parades, he would often join the band to lead them through the streets.

Years after Long's assassination, many of the changes he made to the band and the university were reversed as part of a backlash against his control over LSU and the associated scandals; for instance, Carazo was fired, and the military uniforms were reinstated.

=== After WWII ===
The band remained a military cadet band until the end of World War II when the band department became a part of the School of Music. "During the Carazo years, female students had appeared with the band as drum majorettes, but not in the ranks of musicians." Women first joined the band in 1943. During this period, the band underwent changes that shaped its image. The band hall burned to the ground in 1958, and a new hall was quickly built that is still used by the band. The Ballet Corps (later known as the Golden Girls) was added by director Thomas Tyra in 1959, and the band's modern pregame performance was created in the 1960s by director William F. Swor. The Tiger Band program hit its zenith in 1970 when LSU was named the All-American College TV Band in a one-time national contest sponsored by General Motors. After marching in the Orange Bowl Parade on New Year's Eve and performing at halftime of the 1971 Orange Bowl game on New Year's Day, the Tiger Band flew to Oakland, CA. On January 2, the band performed a different show for another national television audience and officially received the All-American College TV Band Award at halftime of the East-West Shrine Bowl. The trophy was presented to Director Swor by Meredith (The Music Man) Willson, confirming LSU's prominence among the country's top university marching bands.

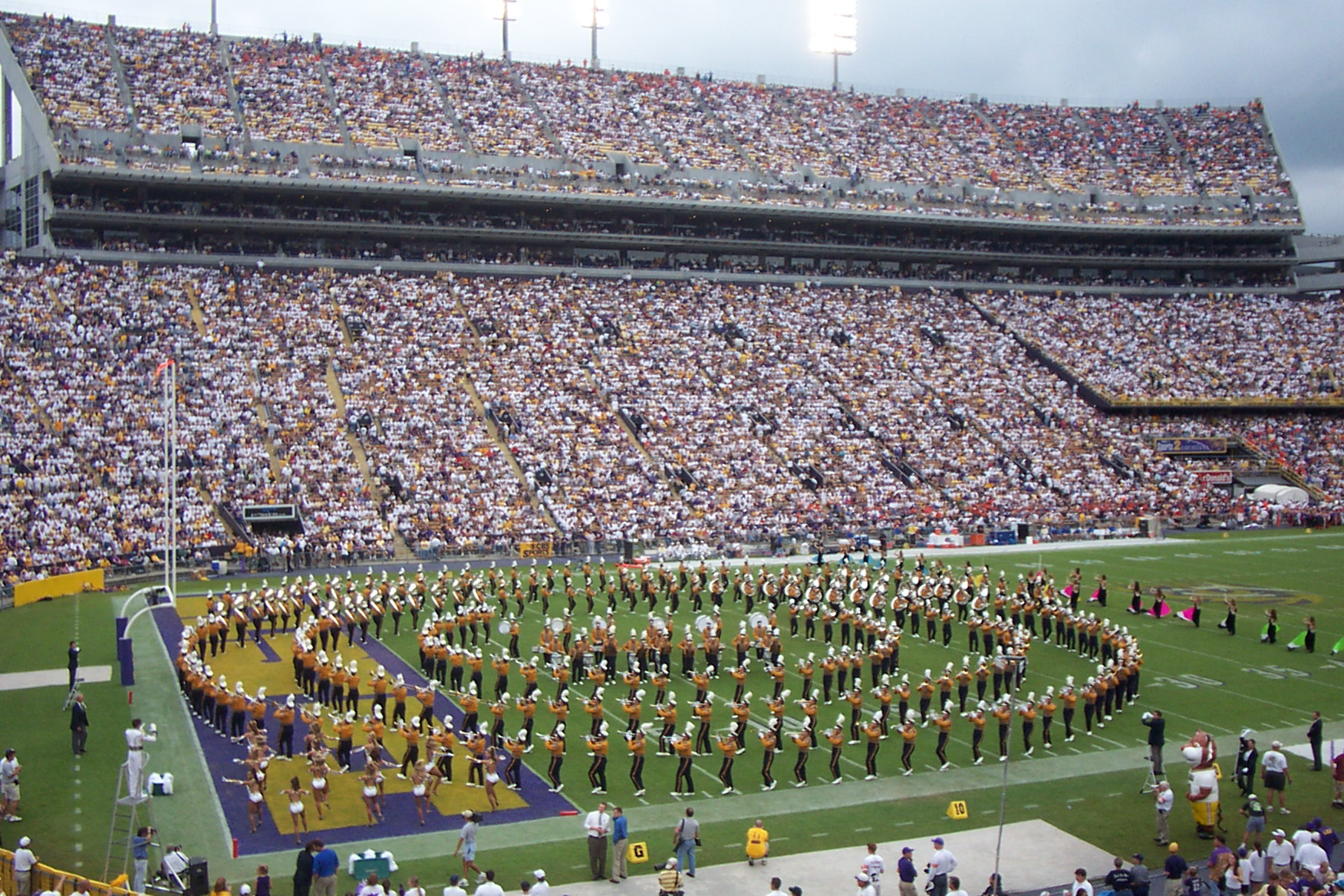
The band creates a set of circles in the end zone during a halftime performance.

=== Awards and International Performances ===
In the fall of 1997, the band directors of the Southeastern Conference unanimously voted for the LSU Tiger Marching Band as the best marching band in the SEC, according to a survey by the Northwest Arkansas Times. In 2002, the marching band won the Sudler Trophy, a one-time award given to the nation's best marching bands.

Four women have led the Tiger Band as drum majors: Kristie Smith (1999), Mindy Hebert (2000), Mary Bahlinger (2014), and Catherine Mansfield (2025).

The band continues to be a celebrated part of the university community, with some members having reported being asked for autographs. The look of the band has been memorialized in a set of 17 miniature, hand-painted figurines that include the different members of the band and that sell for almost $400. One group of fans has even chosen to memorialize the band's Pregame performance by creating shirts with the first four notes of the band's fanfare. On Saturday, October 11, 2008, ESPN announced that the Tiger Band won first place in a competition amongst university bands from Auburn, Clemson, Florida, Georgia, Texas, and USC. Each band played a version of John Williams's Indiana Jones theme, and ESPN posted the videos online for fans to vote. At halftime during the 2009 home football game against Vanderbilt, the band was inducted into the Louisiana Music Hall of Fame.

In 2010, the LSU Golden Girls performed in Hong Kong as part of the Chinese New Year celebration, marking the first-ever international performance by the Golden Band from Tigerland. The Tiger Band added another international performance in 2014 when all 325 members traveled to Dublin, Ireland, to perform in the St. Patrick's Day Parade.

On Game Day, the band makes its way through the campus towards Victory Hill and Tiger Stadium.

== Traditions ==
=== Victory Hill ===
On game days, the band marches from the band hall to Tiger Stadium, stopping by at Victory Hill, located right outside the stadium. Fans lining North Stadium Drive await the arrival of the band. The band stops on the hill and begins to play the opening strains of the "Pregame Salute." Then, while playing the introduction to "Touchdown for LSU," the band starts running in tempo through the streets and down the hill. The band also marches from the stadium to the band hall upon the conclusion of the game, a practice not usually employed by other bands.

=== Pregame ===
One of the traditions carried on by the band is its pregame performance at each home football game. The performance includes pieces from the band's repertoire of school songs, including "Pregame Salute"/"Touchdown for LSU" arranged in 1964 by director William F. Swor specifically for the band to play during pregame. The drill design and musical selections pieced together by Swor remain relatively unchanged today. The band uses a more traditional style of marching (called the "peak step" by directors and members of the band) during pregame, when the band members have to lift their legs to mid-calf as they march.

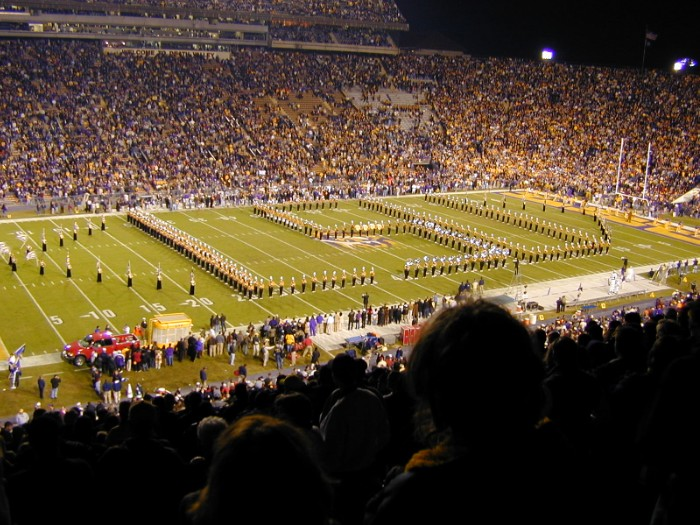
The band forms LSU during a pregame performance in Tiger Stadium.

The band begins its performance in the stadium’s south end zone, called to attention by the drum major before he marches across the end zone. Stopping at the goal line, he wields his mace and signals the band to take the field with a whistle. Marching out to the beat of a single bass drum, the band moves in fronts spaced five yards apart. The drum halts at the 40-yard line, spreading the band across the southern half of the field, with the color guard at midfield and the southern goal line. The Golden Girls line up along the west sideline.

Standing at attention, the band awaits the percussion introduction to Pregame Salute. As they play the opening chords from Tiger Rag, they turn to salute all four corners of the stadium. The tempo accelerates as the music transitions into Long’s Touchdown for LSU, and the band sweeps across the field. Toward the song’s end, they break formation to spell “LSU.”

In the "LSU" formation, the band plays the "LSU Alma Mater" and the "Star-Spangled Banner" and is directed at the north 47 and a half-yard line by the director of bands. The band then plays "Fight for LSU" as it virtually flips the formation to spell LSU for the fans on the east side of the stadium. Upon arriving in the new formation, the band plays the second half of "Tiger Rag" which culminates in the crowd chanting "T-I-G-E-R-S, TIGERS!' in unison. This is followed by the "First Down Cheer," to which the east side of the stadium, in unison, responds to each of the three refrains with "GEAUX! TIGERS!" and to the final refrain with "LSU!" To the sound of a fast-paced drum cadence, the band returns to the original "LSU" formation facing the west side of the stadium and replays the "First Down Cheer". The band immediately breaks into an encore performance of "Touchdown for LSU" as it reforms the original fronts, marches to the north end zone, and then breaks the fronts to form a tunnel through which the football team will enter the field.

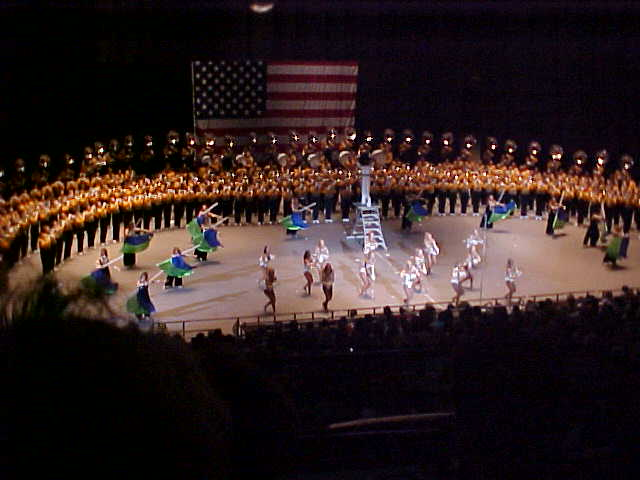
An annual event, the band performs season highlights during Tigerama.

=== Tigerama ===
Each fall, the marching band and the university's top concert performance ensembles join forces for a concert featuring musical highlights from the football season. This annual concert, called Tigerama, is now in its 31st year. Tigerama begins with the LSU Wind Ensemble and the LSU Symphonic Winds playing a number of pieces including "LSU Rhapsody," a concert medley of school songs arranged and orchestrated by Bruce Healy and Ken Whitcomb, and Claude T. Smith's "God of Our Fathers," which includes an antiphonal brass finale during which members of the Tiger Band brass join both of the concert ensembles. During the concert's second half, the Tiger Band enters its traditional cadence, plays songs from each show from the current football season, and concludes with traditional school songs. Tigerama has been performed in the University community at the Pete Maravich Assembly Center, Baton Rouge River Center, and is now at the LSU Student Union Theatre. On a few occasions, Tigerama was a traveling showcase for the Band Department at various performance venues throughout the state, such as the Saenger Theater in New Orleans. The event is also a fundraiser for the Bands program, featuring an auction of memorabilia and opportunities for donors to march down Victory Hill with the band on gameday.

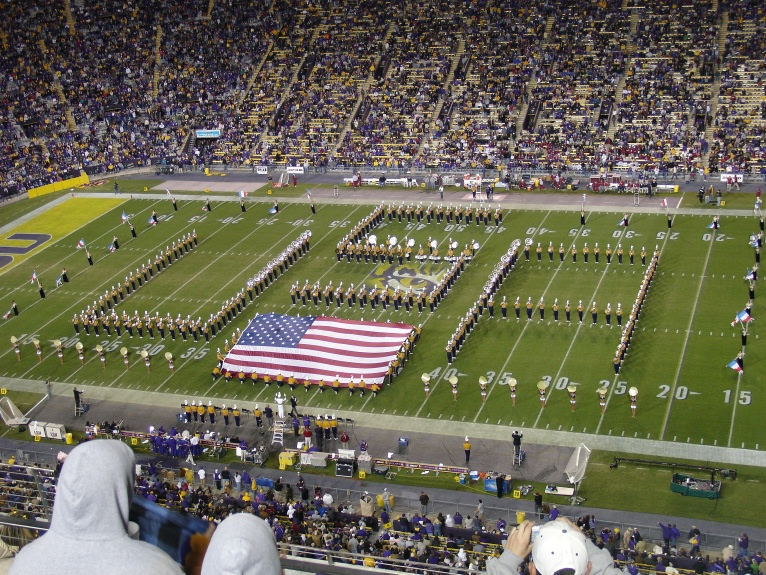
The band pays tribute to veterans and the nation during its annual LSU Salutes halftime performance.

=== LSU Salutes ===
Each fall, the band honors its beginnings as a cadet band and the university's history during LSU Salutes by performing a halftime show with a patriotic theme. Usually, during alternating years, the band plays a medley of songs representing each branch of the U.S. Armed Forces, spells out the names of each branch, and recognizes the members of each branch present in the stadium. This is the only time the Golden Girls and Color Guard change their look and don special red, white, and blue uniforms for the performance. During Veterans Day weekend, LSU Salutes recognizes cadets who have served in the U.S. Armed Forces. Until 1969, every male student entering LSU was required to participate in the ROTC program for at least two years. LSU was once referred to by students and staff alike as the Ole War Skule, and LSU ROTC programs led more than 12,000 soldiers into World War II—a number eclipsed only by Texas A&M University (14,123 officers), and the military academies. The military heritage of the university dates back to its establishment in 1860 as a military training institution; future American Civil War general William Tecumseh Sherman served as its first superintendent.

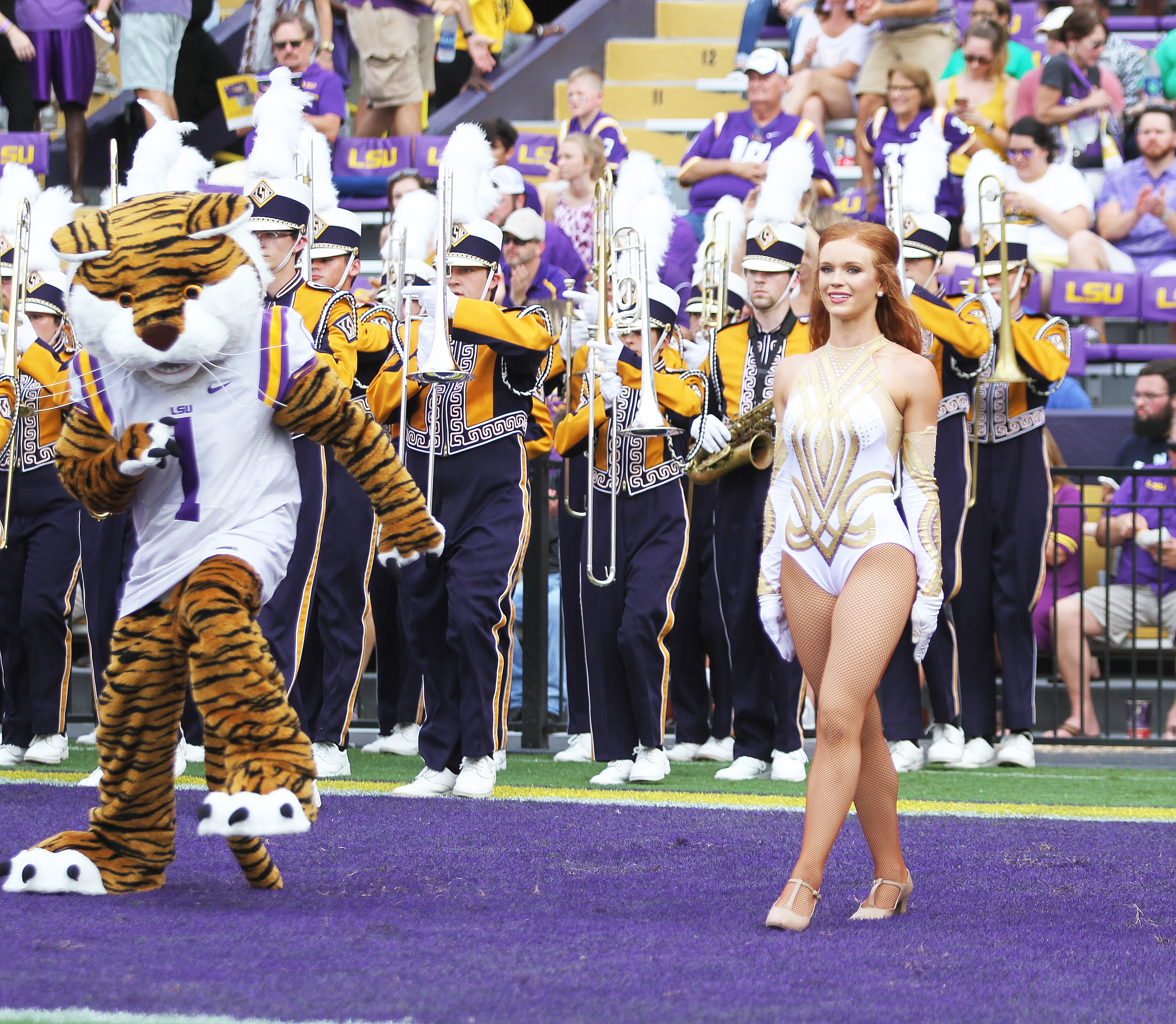
Mike and one of the LSU Golden Girls march onto the field for Pregame.

=== Golden Girls and Color Guard ===
As the band evolved into a full-blown show band, featured auxiliary units were created for more entertainment.

The LSU Golden Girls, a feature unit with the Tiger Band and the oldest and most established dance line on the LSU campus, was created in 1959 as the Ballet Corps by then-director of bands Thomas Tyra. The Golden Girl moniker became official in 1965. Today, the line includes eighteen dancers who audition each year to make the line and who are often members of private dance studios.

The LSU Color Guard, a flag-spinning unit not to be confused with a traditional military color guard, was established in 1971. The audition process includes a solo, self-choreographed routine, fundamentals and an on-the-spot routine all performed for a panel of judges. Twenty-six to thirty-two female or male spinners are selected from this process. For a brief period in the 1980s, the color guard was co-ed but didn't have a male performer until again in 2018. The LSU Color Guard hosts two male performers.

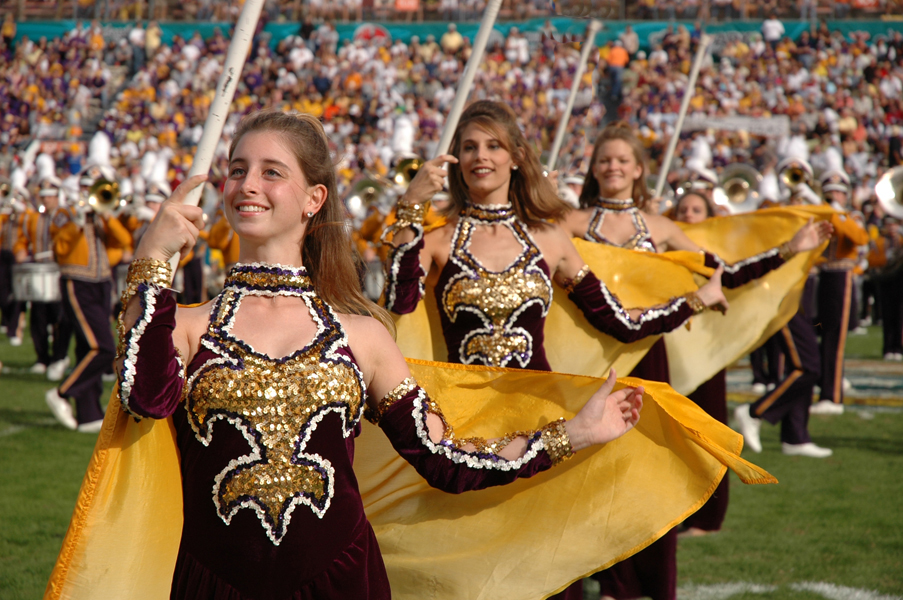
Members of the LSU Color Guard perform at halftime

=== Uniforms ===
In August 2017, Tiger Band purchased new uniforms that continued the recent tradition of purple pants and gold coats with Greek key trim, a motif from outside of Thomas Boyd Hall and David Boyd Hall on LSU's campus.

== Songs of LSU ==
=== "LSU Alma Mater" ===
The "LSU Alma Mater" was written in 1929 by Lloyd Funchess and Harris Downey, two students who developed the original song and music because LSU's first alma mater was sung to the tune of "Far Above Cayuga's Waters" and was used by Cornell University. The band plays the "Alma Mater" during pregame and at the end of each home football game. Also, band members join arm-in-arm at the end of rehearsals on Saturday game days and sing the "Alma Mater" before leaving the practice facility.

=== "Fight for LSU" ===
"Fight for LSU" is the university's official fight song and was written by Castro Carazo in the 1940s. The band plays "Fight for LSU" often, most notably when the team enters the field (while the band is in a tunnel formation at the end of its pregame performance), successfully kicks a field goal, scores an extra point, or completes a two-point conversion. Following a halftime performance, the band often exits the field while playing "Fight for LSU." The full song uses elements of a musical march and consists of an introduction, a strain that is played twice (and sung twice using the same lyrics), a breakup strain (with new lyrics), a return to the introduction, a final repetition of the original strain (at a faster tempo and with the original lyrics), and a coda.

=== "Pregame Salute"/"Touchdown for LSU" ===
"Pregame Salute"/"Touchdown for LSU" is often incorrectly considered by fans as the school's official fight song. The opening chords and melodies of the "Pregame Salute" were derived from "Tiger Rag," a popular jazz tune from 1917, while "Touchdown for LSU," which directly follows the "Pregame Salute" both on the field and in the stands, was written in part by Huey P. Long. This song is played most notably during pregame, the march down Victory Hill, and at the beginning of the fourth quarter of each football game.

=== "Hey, Fightin’ Tigers" ===
"Hey, Fightin’ Tigers" was adopted as a school song in the 1960s by then-director of bands Thomas Tyra. Originally titled "Hey, Look Me Over" and written by Cy Coleman for the musical Wildcat, starring Lucille Ball, a version of the song with its new lyrics by Carolyn Leigh, who wrote the original lyrics of "Hey Look Me Over", after the athletic department purchased the rights to use the song. The band plays this song often in the stands and sometimes to conclude a halftime performance while spelling out "LSU" or "Tigers." The song consists of an introduction, a repeated verse (with lyrics), a drum break during which the band and crowd both shout "T-I-G-E-R-S," and a jazz version of the original tune with various opportunities for the crowd to shout out "LSU." Typically, the full ensemble plays the verse once and then sings the second time while the percussion, tubas, and piccolos play.

The Bengal Brass Basketball Band which plays at all basketball games also plays "Hey Fightin' Tigers" with different lyrics.

=== "Tiger Rag" ===
"Tiger Rag" was first made popular by the Original Dixieland Jazz Band in 1917. It was adopted by several schools that had a tiger as their mascot. LSU started using the song in 1926, making them the first school to use the melody. It was brought to the university by the serving band director Joseph Hemingway. It has been said that years later, Clemson's band director was in Baton Rouge one 1942 Saturday night, and brought it back to South Carolina as his prized possession. The "Hold that Tiger" portion of the song (which musically consists of one pitch played three times followed by a second pitch, up a major third, played once) is the most recognizable portion of the song for LSU fans, as it is incorporated (at different tempos) into both the "Pregame Salute" and the "First Down Cheer." Upon the scoring of a touchdown, the band plays the "Hold that Tiger" portion of the song, which concludes with a "T-I-G-E-R-S" cheer from the crowd.

=== Other pieces ===
- First, second, and third down cheers are played when the Tigers are on offense. The "First Down Cheer" includes the "Hold that Tiger" musical phrase from "Tiger Rag." The "Second Down Cheer" is a musical selection followed by the crowd chanting L-S-U! The "Third Down Cheer" is based on the song "Eye of the Tiger" made famous by Survivor.
- "Tiger Bandits" was created to pay homage to the defensive unit from the 1958 national championship football team. Coach Paul Dietzel called the unit the "Chinese Bandits." The title of the song was eventually changed to "Tiger Bandits" (or just simply "Bandits") to make the tradition more inclusive. The band plays the song when the Tiger defense forces the opposing team to punt on fourth down or makes a noteworthy defensive play (such as intercepting a pass).
- "Darling of LSU" and "The LSU Cadets March" were composed by Huey P. Long and band director Castro Carazo. The songs are no longer a part of the band's everyday repertoire.
- "LSU Tiger Triumph March" was written by Karl King in honor of the band and was first played in Tiger Stadium when the Tigers took on Tennessee in 1952.
- The Cameo song Talking Out the Side of Your Neck has occasionally been played by the band. As it has been associated with a vulgar crowd cheer, the song was banned from the band and has since been played sparingly.

== Bengal Brass ==
A group of 72 members selected from the band constitute the Bengal Brass Basketball Band, often referred to as Bengal Brass. This group consists of brass players with a few woodwind players. (and percussionists on a trap set) is often split into two squads—purple and gold—and performs at LSU select home volleyball matches, many home gymnastics meets, all home men's basketball, and all home women's basketball games in the Pete Maravich Assembly Center. Bengal Brass also travels with the men's and women's basketball teams during postseason play, including trips by both teams to the Final Four. The band has performed in several cities in the United States including Boston, Jacksonville, Indianapolis, San Antonio, Nashville, Cleveland, Austin, New Orleans, Atlanta, San Francisco, Tampa, Pittsburgh, and Seattle among others.

== Facilities ==
=== Band Hall ===
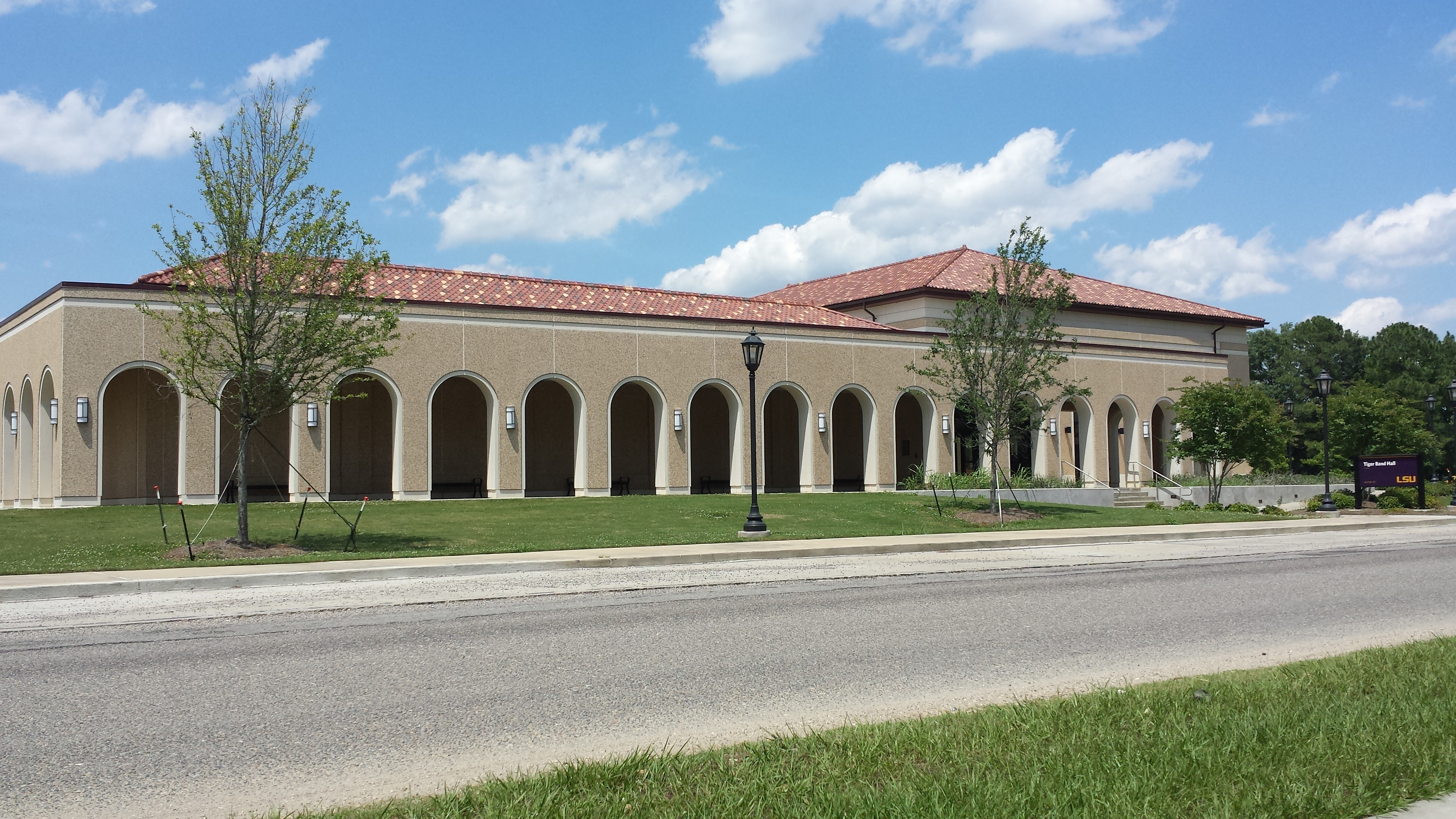
LSU Tiger Band Hall

The LSU Tiger Band Hall is a 17,740-square-foot Italian Renaissance style complex located on Aster Street by the LSU north gates. The $8.7 million complex dedicated on April 26, 2012, was designed by the architecture firm Howard Performance Architecture with Percy J. Matherne Contractor Inc. serving as the project's general contractor.

The complex is used for rehearsals by the Tiger Band and the LSU School of Music's entire band area, including the Wind Ensemble, Symphonic Winds and Symphonic Band concert groups. The facility also hosts concerts and recitals and stores the band's musical instruments, field equipment, and band uniforms, along with color guard banners and Golden Girl uniform accessories. The complex includes a lobby that showcases a band trophy case along with the band's first indoor rehearsal hall/practice space which is based on the floor space of the Pete Maravich Assembly Center. The Bert and Sue Turner Tiger Band Rehearsal Hall includes a projection screen and mirrored walls to accommodate Color Guard and Golden Girl rehearsals. The hall also includes double sets of motorized curtains that line the walls to help with acoustics. (Tiger Band Hall dedication ceremony)

Funding for the project was made possible through an action of the Louisiana Legislature along with matching funds from the university. LSU's matching funds came from athletics ticket sales and private donors who raised approximately $2 million to construct the facility.

LSU has had two other band halls. LSU's second band hall was constructed in 1959 and still stands today. It was built to hold 140 players and is attached to the Music & Dramatic Arts Building, next to the LSU Greek Theater. The original band hall was constructed in 1936 and was destroyed by fire in 1958.

=== Outdoor Practice Field ===
The band has outdoor practice fields used for rehearsals during the week. The outdoor fields also include a 133-square-foot base conductor's tower which oversees the practice fields.

=== Indoor Practice Facility ===
During pre-season camp and on all Saturday home game days, the band uses the LSU Indoor Practice Facility which is part of the Football Operations Center. The indoor facility was built in 1991, is a climate-controlled 82,500 square feet, and is adjacent to LSU's four outdoor 100-yard football practice fields used by the LSU football team.

== Notable alumni ==
- Bill Conti received an Academy Award for his score of The Right Stuff and is also a longtime musical director and conductor for the Academy Awards. His other credits include scores for the James Bond film For Your Eyes Only, Rocky (including the "Gonna Fly Now" theme), and The Karate Kid. He also composed themes for ABC Primetime and Dynasty.
- Emmy Award winner Julie Giroux is credited with writing music for over 100 movie and television programs.
- H. Owen Reed is a composer, conductor, and author, whose works for the band demonstrate his devotion to studying traditional musical styles of Mexican, Native American, Anglo-American, and African American cultures. He has also published eight books on musical composition and music theory.
- Clifton Williams wrote several prolific pieces for the band. He also won the inaugural American Bandmasters Association's Ostwald Award for Original Band Literature in 1956 for his first band composition, "Fanfare and Allegro."
- Carl Fontana, trombonist.

== See also ==
- Louisiana State University traditions
- List of concert halls
- List of music venues
