= LSU Alma Mater =

The "LSU Alma Mater" was written in 1929 by Lloyd Funchess and Harris Downey, two students who developed the original song and music because LSU's first alma mater was sung to the tune of "Far Above Cayuga's Waters" and was used by Cornell University. The band plays the "Alma Mater" during pregame and at the end of each home football game. Also, members of the band join arm-in-arm at the end of rehearsals, and at the conclusion of the game itself, on Saturday game days and sing the "Alma Mater" before leaving the practice facility or stadium, respectively.

== Lyrics ==
Where stately oaks and broad magnolias shade inspiring halls,
There stands our dear Old Alma Mater who to us recalls
Fond memories that waken in our hearts a tender glow,
And make us happy for the love that we have learned to know.
All praise to thee our Alma Mater, molder of mankind,
May greater glory, love unending be forever thine.
Our worth in life will be thy worth we pray to keep it true,
And may thy spirit live in us,
FOREVER L-S-U.
