= Joseph Brant Arseneau =

Canadian entrepreneur

J. Brant Arseneau
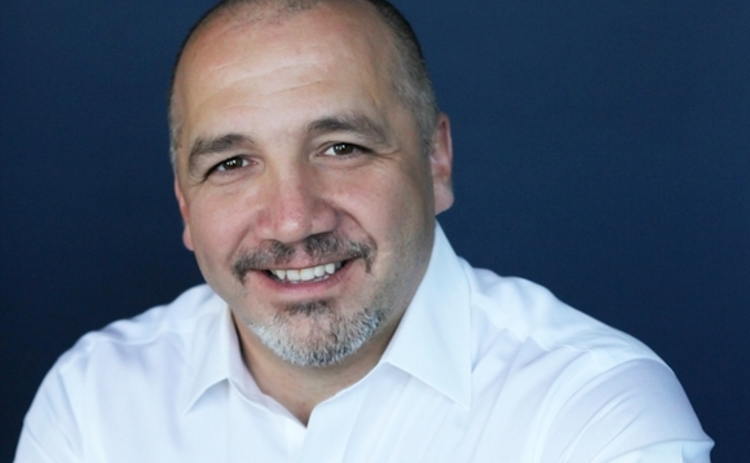
- Arseneau in the August 2012 issue of Waters Technology
- Born: September 3, 1967 (age 58); Canada
- Education: University of New Brunswick
- Occupations: Space & Fintech entrepreneur
- Title: Founder, 9Point8 Capital, Founder, Spaced Ventures

Joseph Brant Arseneau (born September 3, 1967) is an entrepreneur and executive, best known for his work in both fintech and space technology. He is generally known in finance for his work in Electronic Trading, Renewable Energy Derivatives, and Capital Markets technology. He has been both a chief information officer (CIO) for large banks and an entrepreneur, having started several fintech start-ups. Arseneau has moved into the NewSpace industry and is currently a founding partner at 9Point8 Capital and a founder of Spaced Ventures.

== Early life and education ==
Arseneau was born in Canada and began his education at the University of New Brunswick where he became interested in neural networks in 1986. He completed his electrical engineering degree with a senior project entitled "VLSI and Neural Systems". His interest in computational intelligence continued at the University of Aberdeen where he researched the application of neural networks to software reengineering. This research went on to form the foundation to a patent being awarded to Raymond Obin and Brian Reynolds for a commercial reengineering process. Arseneau expanded his research into other areas of biologically-inspired systems (computational intelligence), which included; neural networks, genetic algorithms, fuzzy logic, swarm intelligence, and intelligent agents. His earlier research on computational intelligence and reengineering (software) is frequently cited.

== Career ==
=== Early years ===
He was an early adopter of internet technologies and leveraging his earlier academic work in Software Engineering, he built one of the first Internet-based (HTML) project management tools while at JPMorgan in 1996. The tool was sold to a silicon valley start-up called Netmosphere that eventfully was bought by public company Critical Path in June 2000.
