= Thomas Tyra =

American bandleader (1933-1995)

- On the field at LSU (c. early 1960s)

Background information
- Born: Thomas Tyrakowski; April 17, 1933; Cicero, Illinois, US
- Died: July 7, 1995 (aged 62) Atlanta, Georgia, US
- Occupations: Music educator, bandmaster, composer, arranger, lyricist
- Years active: 1953–1989

Thomas Norman Tyra (born Thomas Tyrakowski) (April 17, 1933 – July 7, 1995) was an American composer, arranger, bandmaster, and music educator.

== Early life and education ==
Born and raised in Cicero, Illinois, Tyra was the only child of first-generation Polish-American parents who were employed by Western Electric's nearby Hawthorne Works. He graduated from Morton High School in Cicero (Diploma 1951), Northwestern University (BSM 1954, GBSM 1955, music education/composition) and the United States Navy School of Music (1956), where he would refine his composition and arranging skills while fulfilling his military service obligations. In 1971, Tyra earned his Ph.D. in music education from the University of Michigan under the auspices of Allen Britton, Emil Holz, and long-time director of bands, William Revelli.

== Bandmaster, music educator and mentor ==
Following graduation from Northwestern in 1955, Tyra began his career as a high school band director in Des Moines, Iowa. The following year, he enlisted in the U.S. Navy and was ordered to Washington, D.C., where he fulfilled his military service obligations as a staff arranger and rehearsal conductor at the Navy School of Music. Upon his honorable discharge in late 1957 - followed by a brief teaching assignment at Morton College in his hometown of Cicero - Tyra joined the Louisiana State University faculty in the Fall of 1958, serving as an assistant to the Director of Bands L. Bruce Jones. In 1959, LSU elevated Tyra to the position of 14th Bandmaster of the Tiger Marching Band, making him - at age 26 - the nation's youngest director of a major university marching band.

That same year Tyra created the LSU Ballet Corps dance line, launching what would in 1965, become the LSU Golden Girls. Satisfying the constant demand for new musical content on the LSU gridiron was a small cadre of aspiring student composers and arrangers which included Bill Conti. Conti would later gain fame by penning Gonna Fly Now, the theme song popularized by the 1976 hit film Rocky. During his tenure, Tyra introduced Hey, Fightin' Tigers, an adaptation of Hey, Look Me Over from the 1960 musical Wildcat! by Cy Coleman and Carolyn Leigh. This team spirit song - later adopted by the LSU Golden Girls as their introductory theme - continues to be used at LSU athletic events today.

In 1964, Tyra was appointed Director of Bands at Eastern Michigan University. In 1968, a young Max Plank joined the EMU Bands Program as Tyra's assistant. Together they forged a lifelong collaboration and friendship that would result in significant growth of the EMU's band program and its traditions. In 2002, Plank passed the leadership mantle to Scott Boerma, ending an era that spanned over 38 years of EMU Band history. After leaving EMU in 1977 and until 1985, Tyra headed the Department of Music at Western Carolina University in Cullowhee, North Carolina, strengthening its Music Education curriculum and planting the seeds of growth for its instrumental performance programs, including marching band. From 1985 until his retirement in 1989, he served as Professor and Dean of the Crane School of Music at SUNY-Potsdam.

He also held appointments as Director of the Ann Arbor Civic Band (late 1960s to 1977) and guest Clinician at the Ontario Youth Music Camp in Beaverton, Ontario, Canada (1970–73).

Tyra was a member of the Iota Chapter of Phi Mu Alpha Sinfonia at Northwestern University, the Kappa Kappa Psi/Tau Beta Sigma band service organization and served as ΚΚΨ's National President from 1973 to 1975. He was also a member of ASCAP and the American Federation of Musicians.

== Composer, arranger and lyricist ==
Tyra wrote numerous original compositions, arrangements, and lyrics for works performed by wind ensembles, marching bands, military bands, and brass ensembles of all levels.

For beginning bands, Tyra wrote a series of compositions that he (whimsically) titled Wholey Hymn, Modal March, Pentatonic Polka, Quartal Caper, and Polytonal Parade. Compositions and arrangements for intermediate bands include Two 17th Century Italian Songs and arrangements of Handel's The Messiah (Part I) and "I'd Do Anything" from the Lionel Bart musical Oliver!. His Two Gaelic Folk Songs (1964) - an arrangement of the two Irish patriotic tunes Molly Malone and Wearing of the Green in the 20th-century classical music idiom - remains in the standard repertoire for many intermediate band programs. A third Gaelic tune, The Minstrel Boy, was also arranged by Tyra and originally intended to round out this collection. Never published, it is now part of the Music Department archives at Eastern Michigan University.

For more skilled ensembles, he penned many arrangements of pre-game and half-time music for the Northwestern, LSU and EMU Marching Bands, including nationally televised works performed by the Tiger Marching Band when LSU competed post-season at the Sugar Bowl (1959, 1960), the Orange Bowl (1962), the Cotton Bowl Classic (1963) and the Bluebonnet Bowl (1964). His original compositions include Suite for Brass and Timpani, Three Christmas Miniatures, Ceremonial Sketch and Intravention. For Eastern Michigan University, Tyra composed Eastern Variants, the music and lyrics for Go Green!, The Pride of the Peninsula, Huron War Cry, EMU Fanfare and the break strain for the Huron (now Eagle) Fight Song on YouTube. These compositions - integral to modern EMU band tradition - reflect the expertise he developed in writing for low brass voices while serving at the U.S. Navy School of Music.

== Northwestern University alma mater ==
As part of Northwestern University's early 1950s efforts to revitalize its school hymn (Quaecumque Sunt Vera), then Director-of-Bands John Paynter, recruited Tyra - at the time an undergraduate music major, trumpet player and staff assistant for the Wildcat Band - to craft English words to replace the hymn's traditional Latin verse. The earliest known recorded performance of their resulting collaboration - renamed Alma Mater (University Hymn) - was made on October 3, 1953, by the Northwestern Glee Club.

Paynter's instrumental/a cappella musical arrangement and Tyra's lyrics (. . . Hail to Purple, Hail to White, Hail to thee Northwestern . . . .) remain an integral part of Northwestern University tradition today, typically played by the Wildcat Band at the completion of their halftime performances and at Northwestern graduation ceremonies. See the Wildcat Band performing the Northwestern Alma Mater on YouTube.

== Marriage and family ==
Tyra was married four times. In 1955, he married Suzanne Jocelyn Sheldon (Northwestern BSM 1955, b.1933 d.1973) of Chico, California. Their union produced his six - and only children. After divorcing in 1972, Suzanne "Sue" Tyra died in December 1973. In May 1976, he married Valerie Suzanne Franklin (Eastern Michigan University BBA 1971) of Brooklyn, Michigan. They divorced in December 1980. In 1981, Tyra married Judith Ann Hastings Carpenter (b.1942, d.1987) of Pittsburg, Kansas, who preceded him in death.

Tyra's granddaughter, Emily Tyra, is an established television, film and Broadway actress. Beginning in 2016, she joined the cast of CBS Entertainment's Code Black television series, portraying Dr. Noa Kean.

== Final years ==
Following his 1989 retirement from the Crane School of Music, Tyra relocated to Atlanta, Georgia where he would spend his remaining years living nearby his daughters and their families. He died on July 7, 1995, of complications arising from leukemia. During his long illness, he liked to tell his doctors that he would put up a good fight, but it was their job to find a cure in time.

== Gallery ==
At U.S. Navy School of Music (ca 1956)

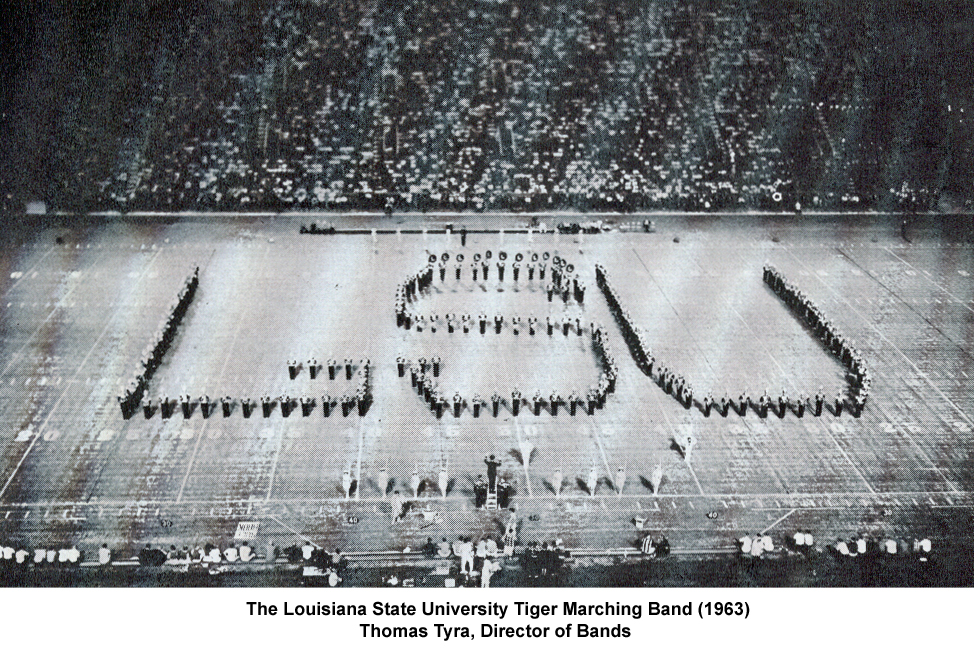
1963 LSU Tiger Marching Band

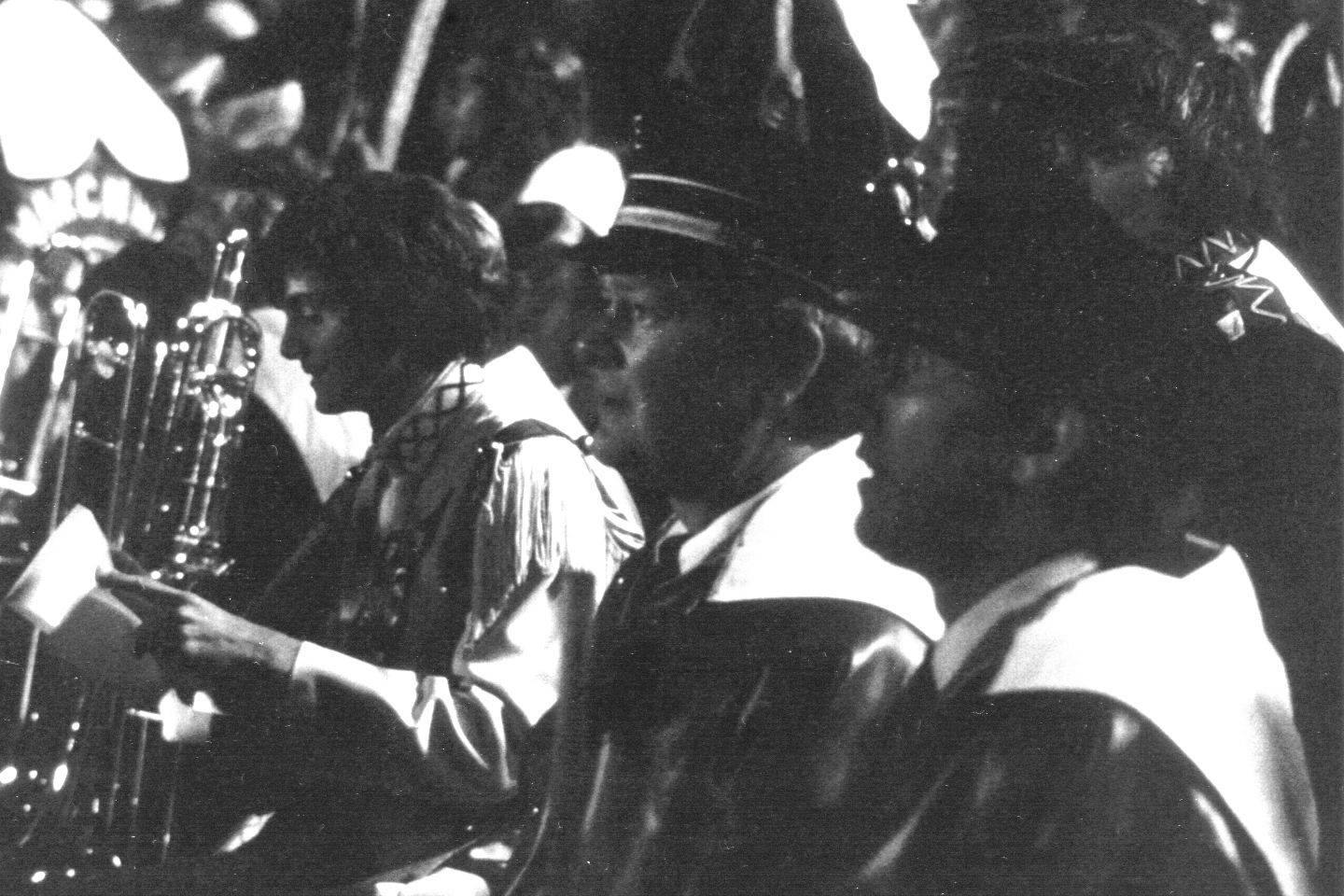
Tyra and Max Plank at Eastern Michigan University (ca 1970s)

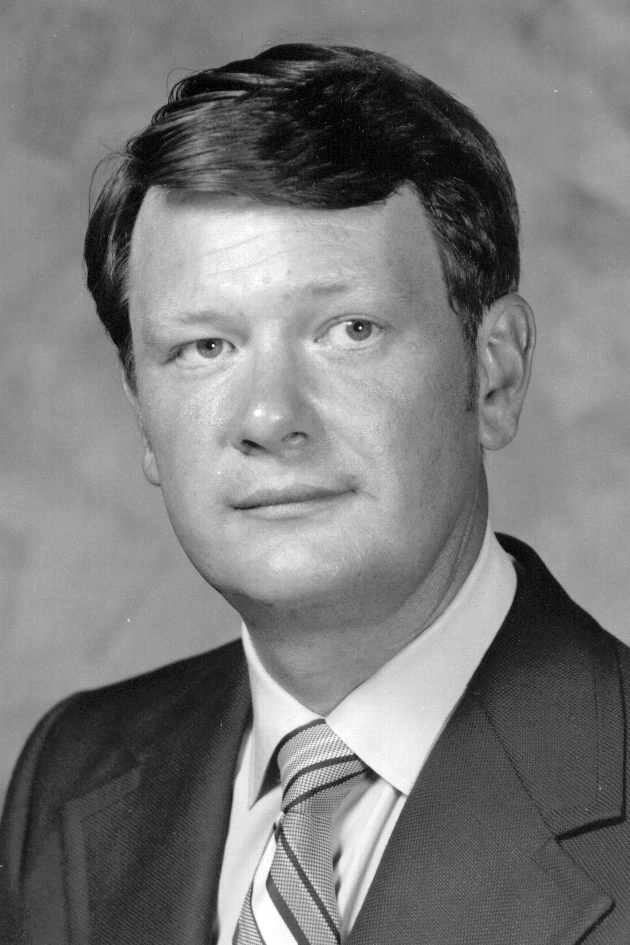
At Eastern Michigan University (ca 1970)

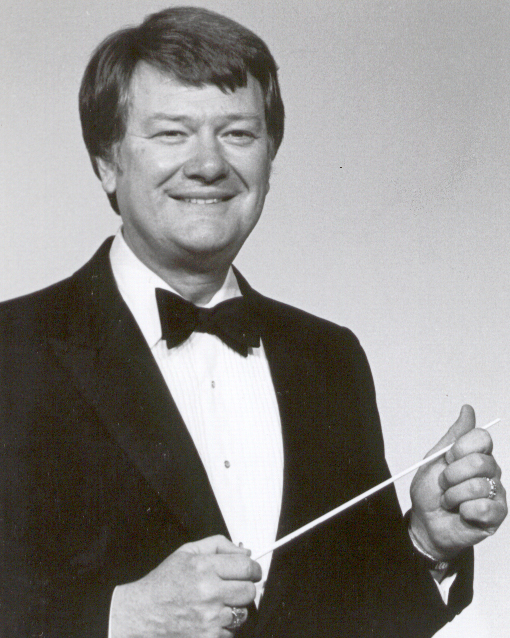
Dean, SUNY Crane School of Music (ca 1986)

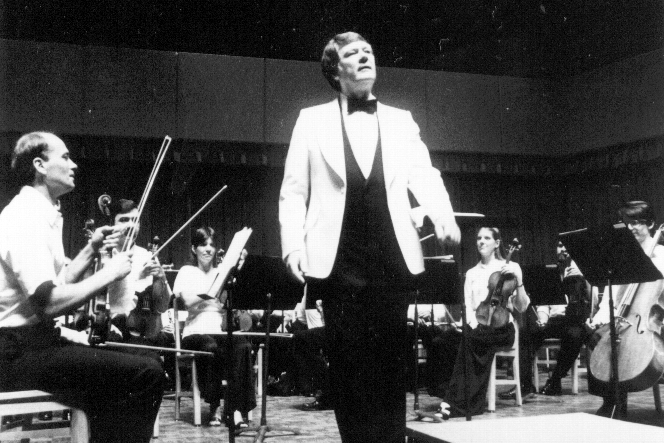
At SUNY-Potsdam Crane School of Music (ca 1986)
