= -eaux =

French language noun plural form suffix

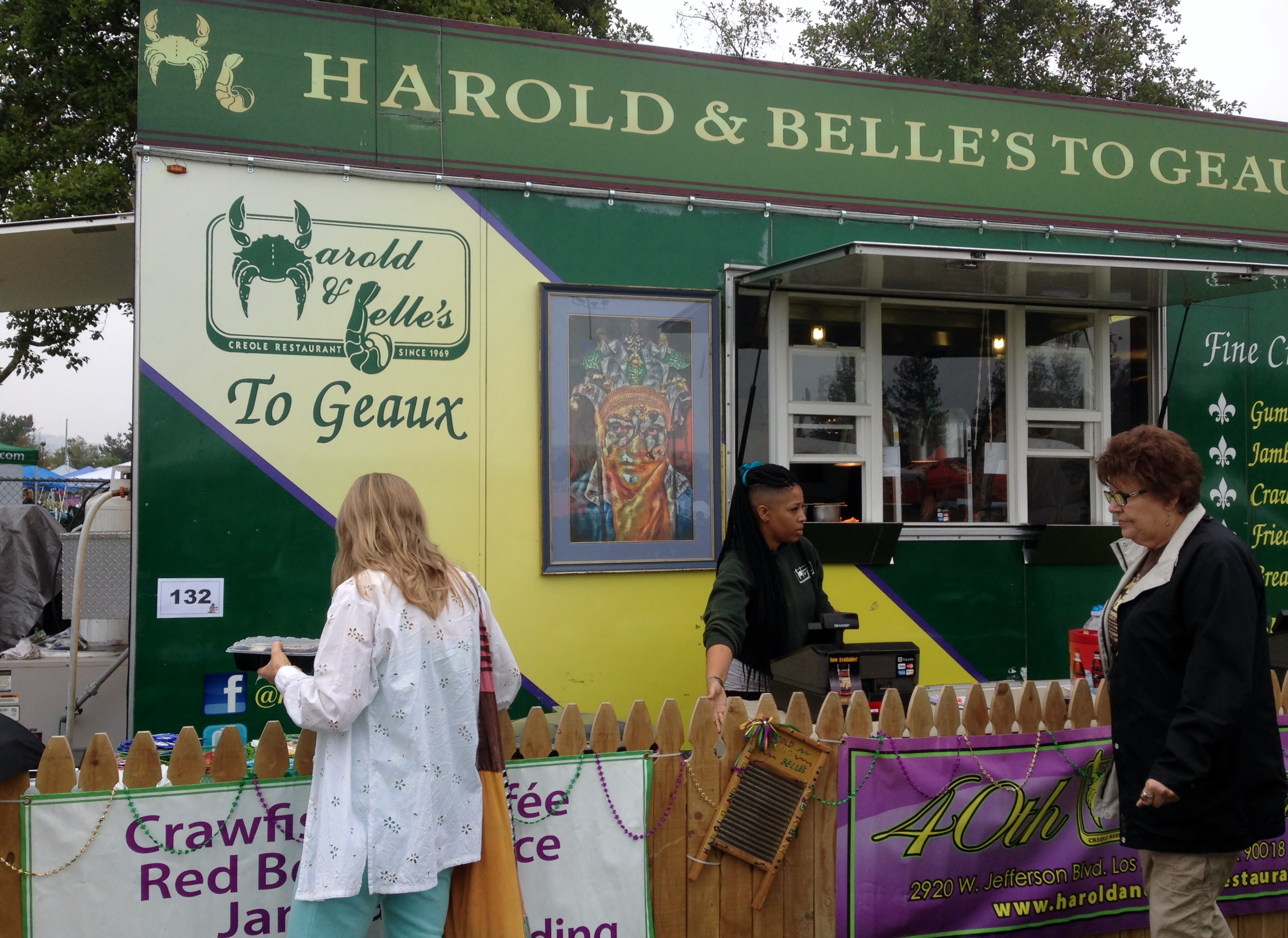
Louisiana Creole restaurant food truck in California using the "geaux" spelling as a partial replacement of "to go."

‑eaux is the standard French language plural form of nouns ending in ‑eau, e.g. eau → eaux, château → châteaux, gâteau → gâteaux. In the United States, it often occurs as the ending of Cajun surnames, as well as a replacement for the long "O" (/oʊ/) sound in some English words as a marker of Cajun, or more broadly Louisiana, identity.

== French Louisiana surnames ==
Compared to spelling conventions elsewhere in the French-speaking world, ‑eaux is an extremely common ending for Cajun and Creole surnames that end in the long "O" sound ([o]), e.g., Arceneaux, Babineaux, Boudreaux, Breaux, Comeaux, Desormeaux, Marceaux, Meaux, Primeaux, Robicheaux, Simoneaux, Thibodeaux, etc. While the same surnames in Quebec and elsewhere in Canada are generally spelled without a terminal x, only relatively few Louisiana surnames make use of alternate representations of this sound, such as Billeaud, Guilbeau, Rougeau, Soileau, and Thériot, with many of these latter names indeed spelled with a final ‑eaux by some families.

Although there is debate about the exact emergence of the ‑eaux spelling in Louisiana, it has been claimed that the spelling originated in the 18th and 19th centuries when French Louisianians, for the most part illiterate and supposedly unable to sign their own name, often resorted to making an X mark at the end of their printed name in order to sign legal documents. Because many Cajun and Creole surnames of French origin already ended in ‑eau, these names' endings eventually became standardized as ‑eaux.

This claim has been disputed by the historian Carl Brasseaux, who insists that the ‑eaux ending was one of many possible ways to standardize Louisiana surnames ending in an [o] sound. Brasseaux credits St. Martin Parish Judge Pierre Paul Briant for standardizing the ‑eaux spelling of these names during his oversight of the 1820 U.S. Census. In addition, the counts of Pontchartrain and Maurepas spelled their surname "Phélypeaux," among others, indicating a precedence for the x spelling in at least some parts of France.

== English-language use in Louisiana ==
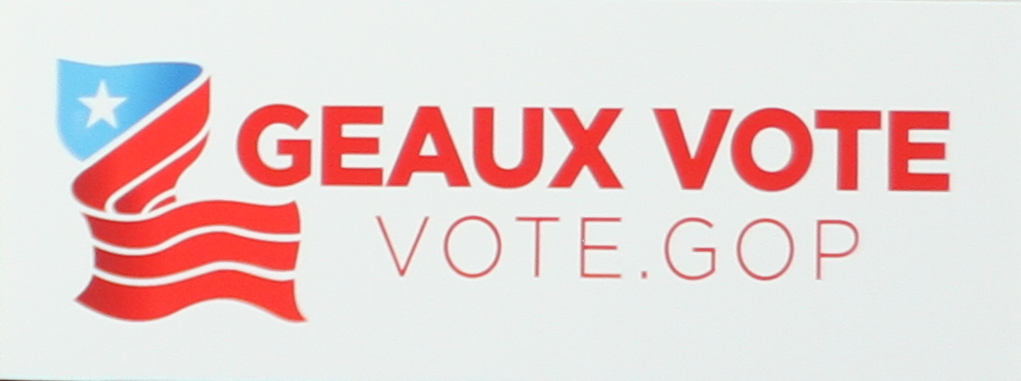
A Louisiana campaign rally sign encouraging people to "geaux vote."

The use of ‑eaux as a replacement for /oʊ/ in English-language contexts can be considered a salient feature of English usage in Louisiana. It is used in Louisiana as a marker of Cajun (or more broadly Louisiana) heritage, particularly at collegiate and professional sporting events, typified as "Geaux Tigers", "Geaux Cajuns", or "Geaux Saints" being pronounced as "Go Tigers", "Go Cajuns", and "Go Saints". Louisiana State University trademarked the phrase "Geaux Tigers" in 2005, and University of Louisiana at Lafayette similarly trademarked "Geaux Cajuns" in 2014. There was also a racehorse named Geaux Rocket Ride.

However, in the French language, a letter "e" or "i" that immediately follows a "g" will cause the "g" to become soft. Therefore, the pronunciation of "geaux" is actually [ʒo], and not /ɡoʊ/. Preserving the hard g-sound would either require removing the "e" (resulting in gaux) or inserting a silent "u" after "g" (gueaux).
