= Louise Arseneault =

Canadian psychologist

- Education: University of Montreal
- Scientific career
- Fields: Developmental psychology
- Institutions: King's College London
- Thesis: Etude du role des complications perinatales et de l'adversite familiale dans la prediction des comportements violents (1998)
- Doctoral advisor: Richard E. Tremblay
- Website: louise-arseneault.com

Louise Arseneault FMedSci is a Canadian psychologist and Professor of Developmental Psychology in the Social, Genetic & Developmental Psychiatry Centre in the Institute of Psychiatry, Psychology and Neuroscience at King's College London, where she has taught since 2001.

== Life ==
She was appointed a Mental Health Leadership Fellow in 2016 at the Economic and Social Research Council in London. In that capacity, she advanced the importance of the social sciences within the mental health research community. Regarding the challenges that the issue of mental health poses for our society, communities and individuals, Arseneault's expertise contributed leadership on ways that research can make contributions to the field. Part of her fellowship allowed her to pursue her own research project, which studied the impact of social relationships on mental health and wellness.

She was elected a Fellow of the Academy of Medical Sciences in 2018.

Arseneault is known for her research on mental disorders, substance abuse, and the mental health effects of childhood bullying.

== Selected publications ==
- Moffitt, Terrie E.; Arseneault, Louise; Belsky, Daniel; Dickson, Nigel; Hancox, Robert J.; Harrington, HonaLee; Houts, Renate; Poulton, Richie; Roberts, Brent W.; Ross, Stephen; Sears, Malcolm R.; Thomson, W. Murray; Caspi, Avshalom (15 February 2011). "A gradient of childhood self-control predicts health, wealth, and public safety". Proceedings of the National Academy of Sciences. 108 (7): 2693–2698. doi:10.1073/pnas.1010076108. ISSN 0027-8424. PMC 3041102. PMID 21262822.
- Holmes, Emily A; O'Connor, Rory C; Perry, V Hugh; Tracey, Irene; Wessely, Simon; Arseneault, Louise; Ballard, Clive; Christensen, Helen; Cohen Silver, Roxane; Everall, Ian; Ford, Tamsin; John, Ann; Kabir, Thomas; King, Kate; Madan, Ira; Michie, Susan; Przybylski, Andrew K; Shafran, Roz; Sweeney, Angela; Worthman, Carol M; Yardley, Lucy; Cowan, Katherine; Cope, Claire; Hotopf, Matthew; Bullmore, Ed (1 June 2020). "Multidisciplinary research priorities for the COVID-19 pandemic: a call for action for mental health science". The Lancet Psychiatry. 7 (6): 547–560. doi:10.1016/S2215-0366(20)30168-1. ISSN 2215-0366. PMC 7159850. PMID 32304649. S2CID 215769580.
- Arseneault, Louise; Cannon, Mary; Poulton, Richie; Murray, Robin; Caspi, Avshalom; Moffitt, Terrie E. (23 November 2002). "Cannabis use in adolescence and risk for adult psychosis: longitudinal prospective study". BMJ. 325 (7374): 1212–1213. doi:10.1136/bmj.325.7374.1212. ISSN 0959-8138. PMC 135493. PMID 12446537.
- Caspi, Avshalom; Moffitt, Terrie E.; Cannon, Mary; McClay, Joseph; Murray, Robin; Harrington, HonaLee; Taylor, Alan; Arseneault, Louise; Williams, Ben; Braithwaite, Antony; Poulton, Richie; Craig, Ian W. (15 May 2005). "Moderation of the Effect of Adolescent-Onset Cannabis Use on Adult Psychosis by a Functional Polymorphism in the Catechol-O-Methyltransferase Gene: Longitudinal Evidence of a Gene X Environment Interaction". Biological Psychiatry. 57 (10): 1117–1127. doi:10.1016/j.biopsych.2005.01.026. ISSN 0006-3223. PMID 15866551. S2CID 39405111.
- Arseneault, Louise; Cannon, Mary; Witton, John; Murray, Robin M. (February 2004). "Causal association between cannabis and psychosis: examination of the evidence". The British Journal of Psychiatry. 184 (2): 110–117. doi:10.1192/bjp.184.2.110. ISSN 0007-1250. PMID 14754822. S2CID 5028930.
- Caspi, Avshalom; Moffitt, Terrie E.; Cannon, Mary; McClay, Joseph; Murray, Robin; Harrington, HonaLee; Taylor, Alan; Arseneault, Louise; Williams, Ben; Braithwaite, Antony; Poulton, Richie; Craig, Ian W. (15 May 2005). "Moderation of the Effect of Adolescent-Onset Cannabis Use on Adult Psychosis by a Functional Polymorphism in the Catechol-O-Methyltransferase Gene: Longitudinal Evidence of a Gene X Environment Interaction". Biological Psychiatry. 57 (10): 1117–1127. doi:10.1016/j.biopsych.2005.01.026. ISSN 0006-3223. PMID 15866551. S2CID 39405111.
- Arseneault, L.; Bowes, L.; Shakoor, S. (May 2010). "Bullying victimization in youths and mental health problems: 'Much ado about nothing'?". Psychological Medicine. 40 (5): 717–729. doi:10.1017/S0033291709991383. ISSN 1469-8978. PMID 19785920. S2CID 2424500.
- Arseneault, Louise; Moffitt, Terrie E.; Caspi, Avshalom; Taylor, Pamela J.; Silva, Phil A. (1 October 2000). "Mental Disorders and Violence in a Total Birth Cohort: Results From the Dunedin Study". Archives of General Psychiatry. 57 (10): 979–986. doi:10.1001/archpsyc.57.10.979. ISSN 0003-990X. PMID 11015816.
- Takizawa, Ryu; Maughan, Barbara; Arseneault, Louise (1 July 2014). "Adult Health Outcomes of Childhood Bullying Victimization: Evidence From a Five-Decade Longitudinal British Birth Cohort". American Journal of Psychiatry. 171 (7): 777–784. doi:10.1176/appi.ajp.2014.13101401. ISSN 0002-953X. PMID 24743774.
